= List of Danish sportspeople =

This is a list of people from Denmark notable for their involvement in sports or athletics.

== Badminton ==
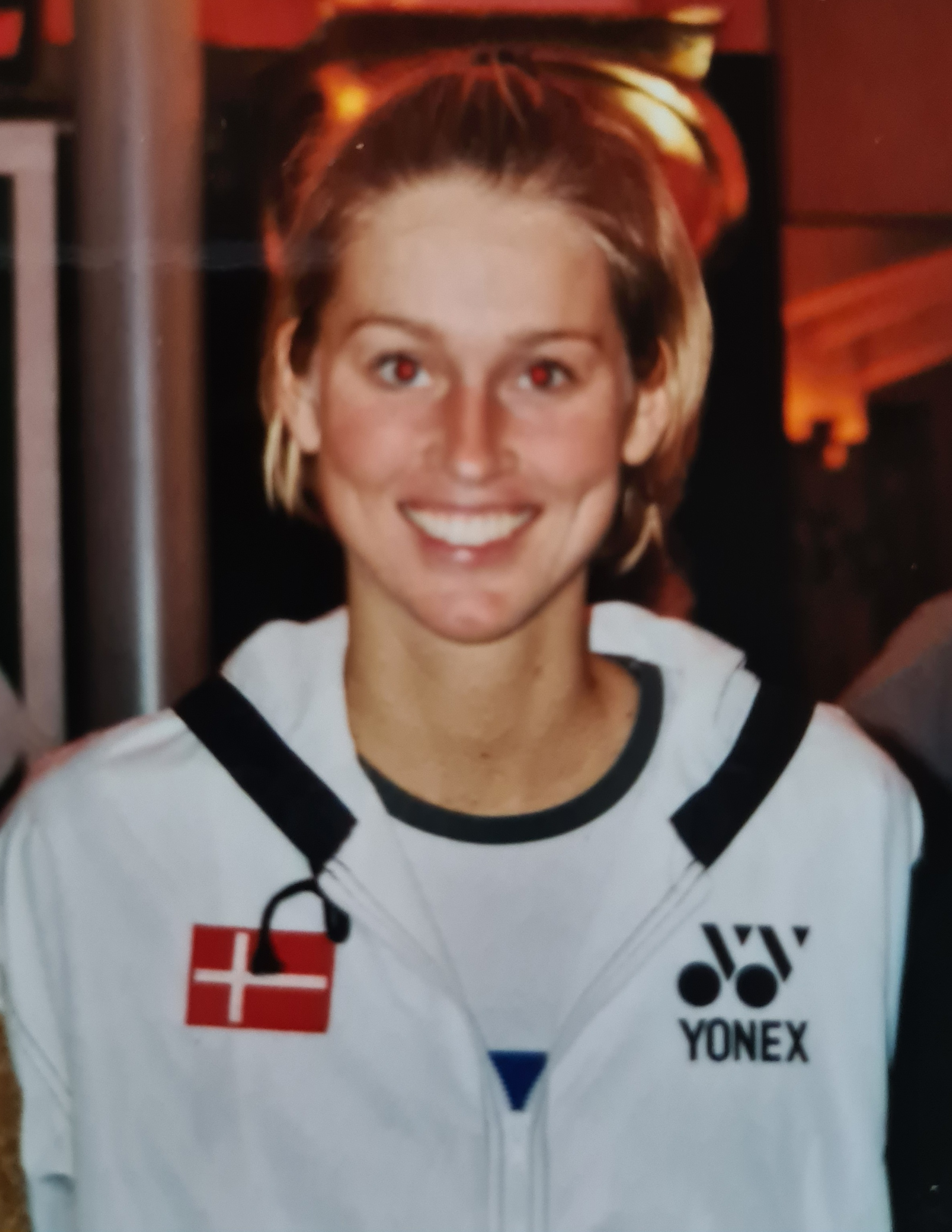
Camilla Martin

- Morten Frost, men's single, All England master 1982, 1984, 1986, and 1987
- Peter Gade, men's single, All England master 1999
- Lene Køppen, women's single, World champion 1977, All England master 1979
- Poul-Erik Høyer Larsen, men's single, 1996 Olympic gold
- Camilla Martin, women's single, World champion 1999, All England master 2002, Olympic silver medalist
- Svend Pri, men's single, All England master 1975
- Alfa Tofft (1911–2004), pioneering female player, founder of Aarhus Badmintonklub

== Basketball ==
- Chanan Colman (born 1984), Danish-Israeli professional basketball player for the Copenhagen Wolfpack of the Danish Basketligaen
- Darko Jukić (born 1990), professional basketball player for the Bakken Bears
- Noam Yaacov (born 2004), Israeli–Danish player in the Israeli Basketball Premier League

== Bicycle racing ==
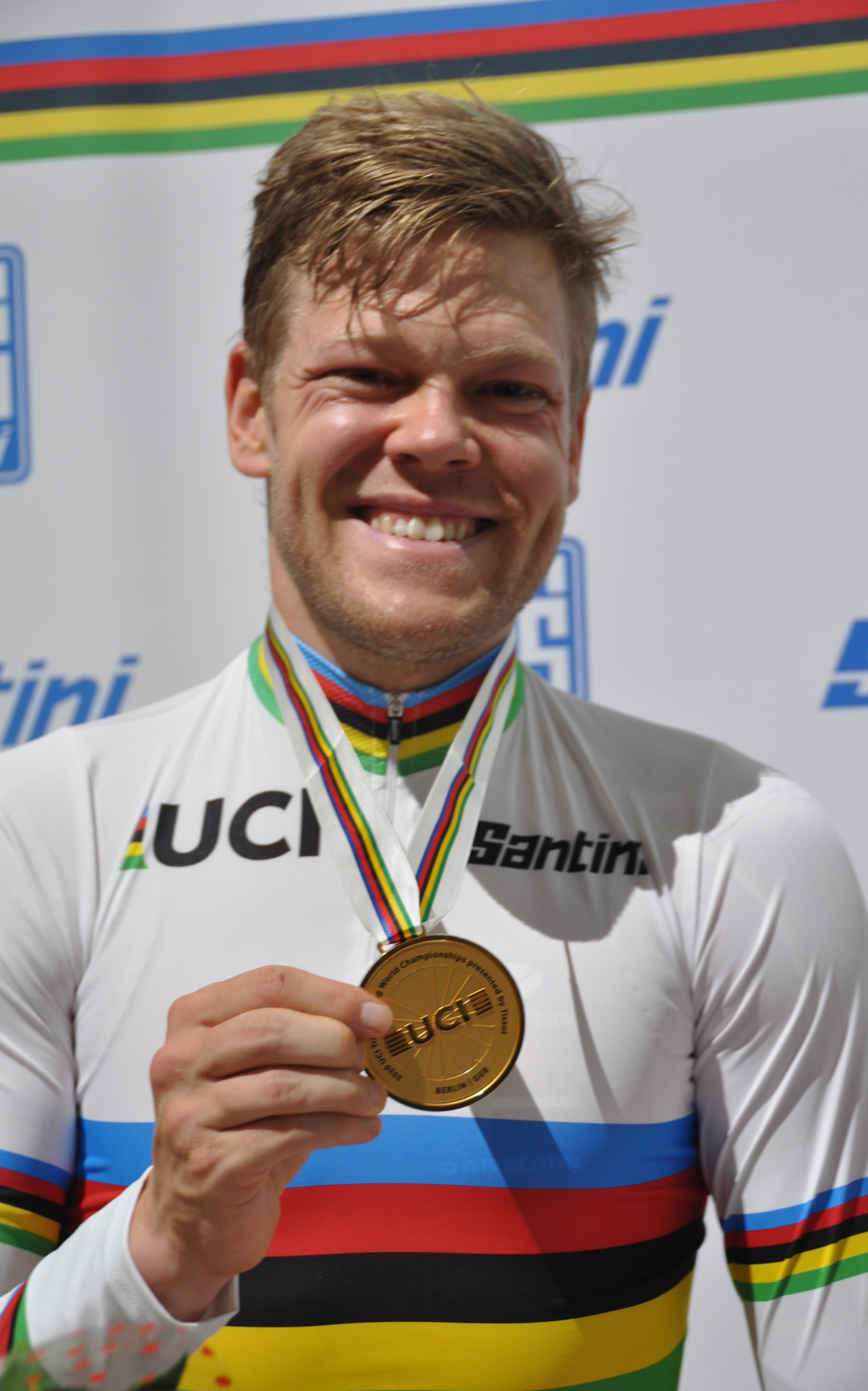
Lasse Norman Hansen

- Kim Andersen, road bicycle racing
- Thorvald Ellegaard, track cycling, six-fold world professional champion in sprint
- Niels Fredborg, track cycling, Olympic gold medalist 1972
- Lasse Norman Hansen, track cycling, Olympic gold medalist 2012
- Michael Rasmussen, road bicycle racing, King of the Mountains in the 2005 and 2006 Tour de France
- Bjarne Riis, road bicycle racing, Tour de France winner 1996
- Ole Ritter, road bicycle racing, two silver medals at the world championship
- Jesper Skibby, road bicycle racing
- Rolf Sørensen, road bicycle racing, Olympic silver medalist 1996
- Jakob Fuglsang
- Michael Valgren
- Jonas Vingegaard, road bicycle racing, Tour de France winner 2022 and 2023

== Boxing ==
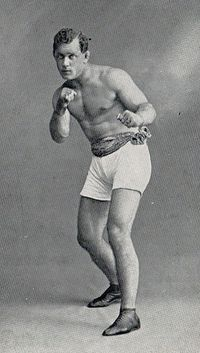
Waldemar Holberg

- Waldemar Holberg (1883–1947), World Welterweight Champion boxer
- Mikkel Kessler (born 1979), boxer
- Michael Michaelsen (1899–1970), Olympic heavyweight bronze medalist boxer
- Brian Nielsen (born 1965), Olympic super heavyweight bronze medalist boxer

== Cricket ==
- Christo Botma

== Fencing ==
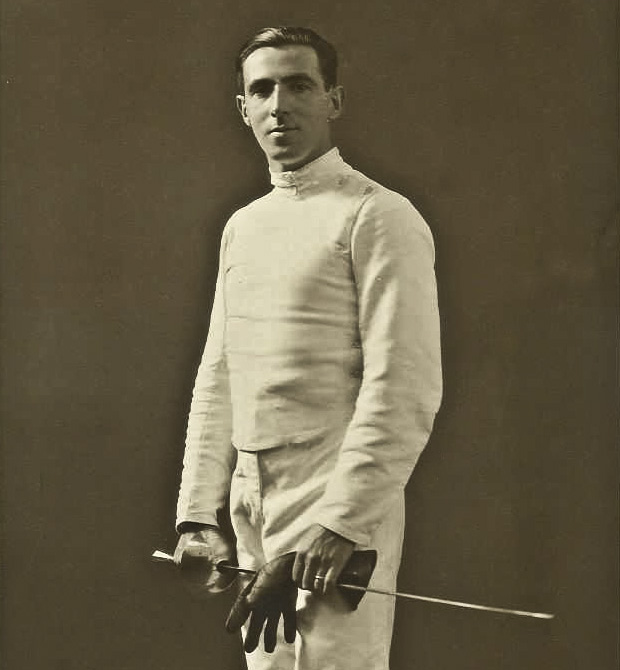
Ivan Osiier

- Ivan Osiier, épée, foil, and sabre fencer, Olympic silver (épée), 25-time Danish champion
- Ellen Osiier (1890–1962), Olympic fencing foil champion
- Poul Rasmussen (1896–1966), Olympic fencer
- Ivan Ruben (1917–1986) , Olympic fencer
- Herbert Sander (1879–1947) , Olympic fencer
- Kay Schrøder (1877–1949), Olympic fencer
- Einar Schwartz-Nielsen (1883–1930), Olympic fencer
- Flemming Vögg (1914–1991), Olympic fencer

== Football ==
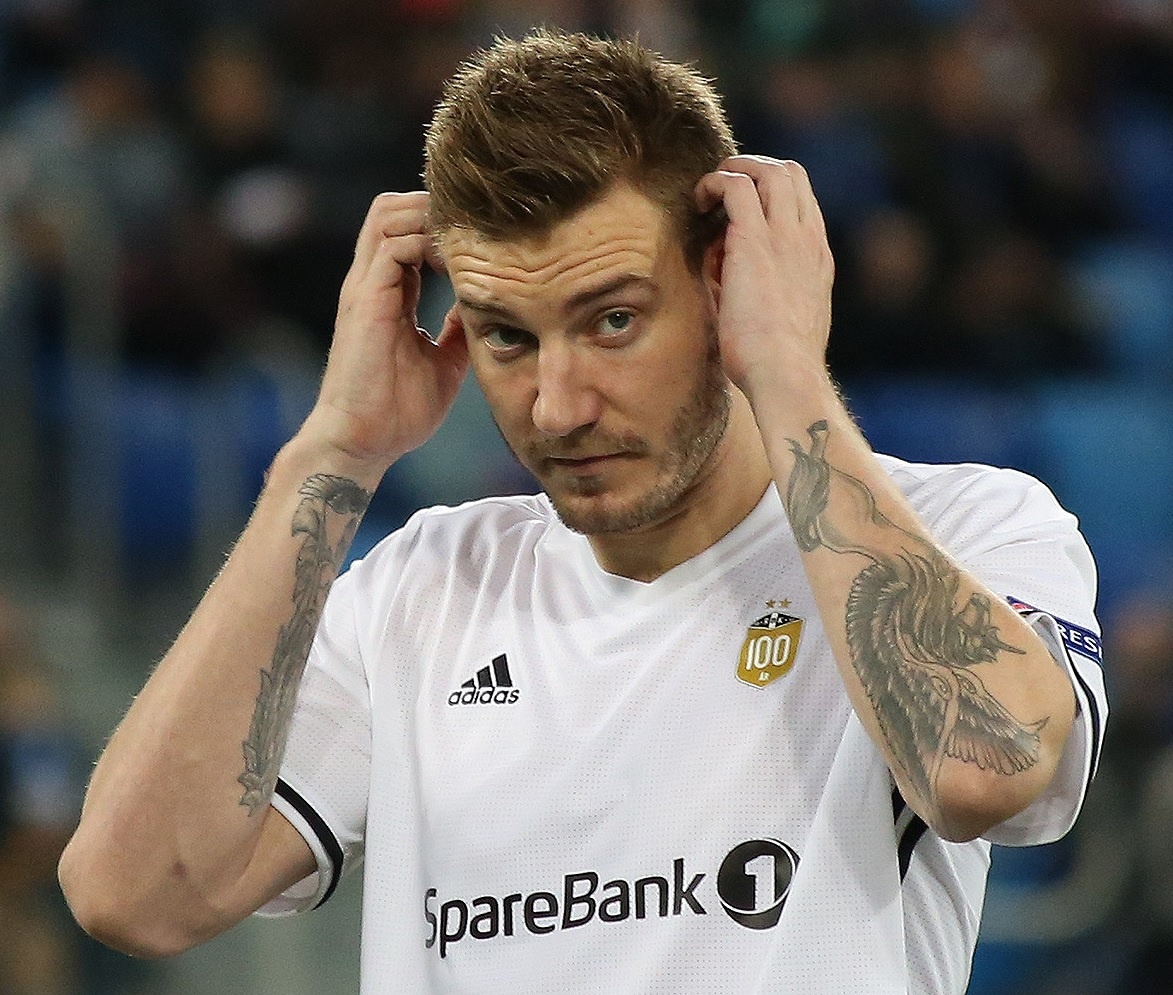
Nicklas Bendtner

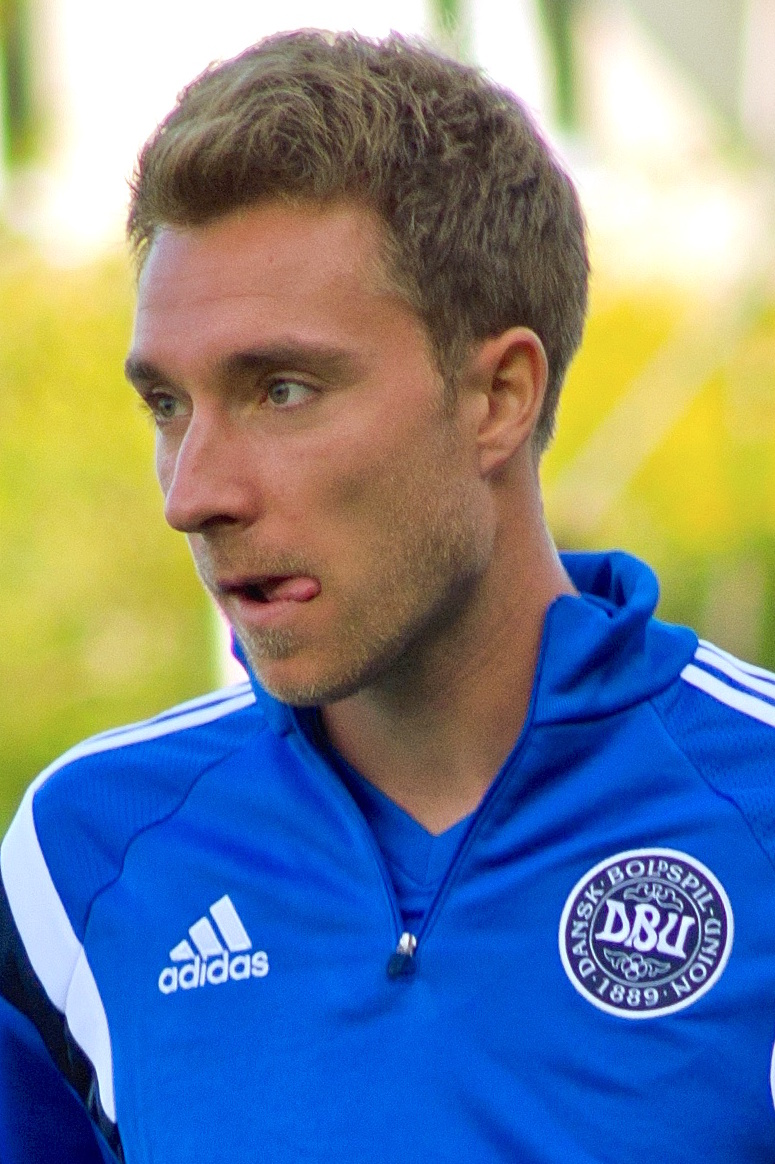
Christian Eriksen

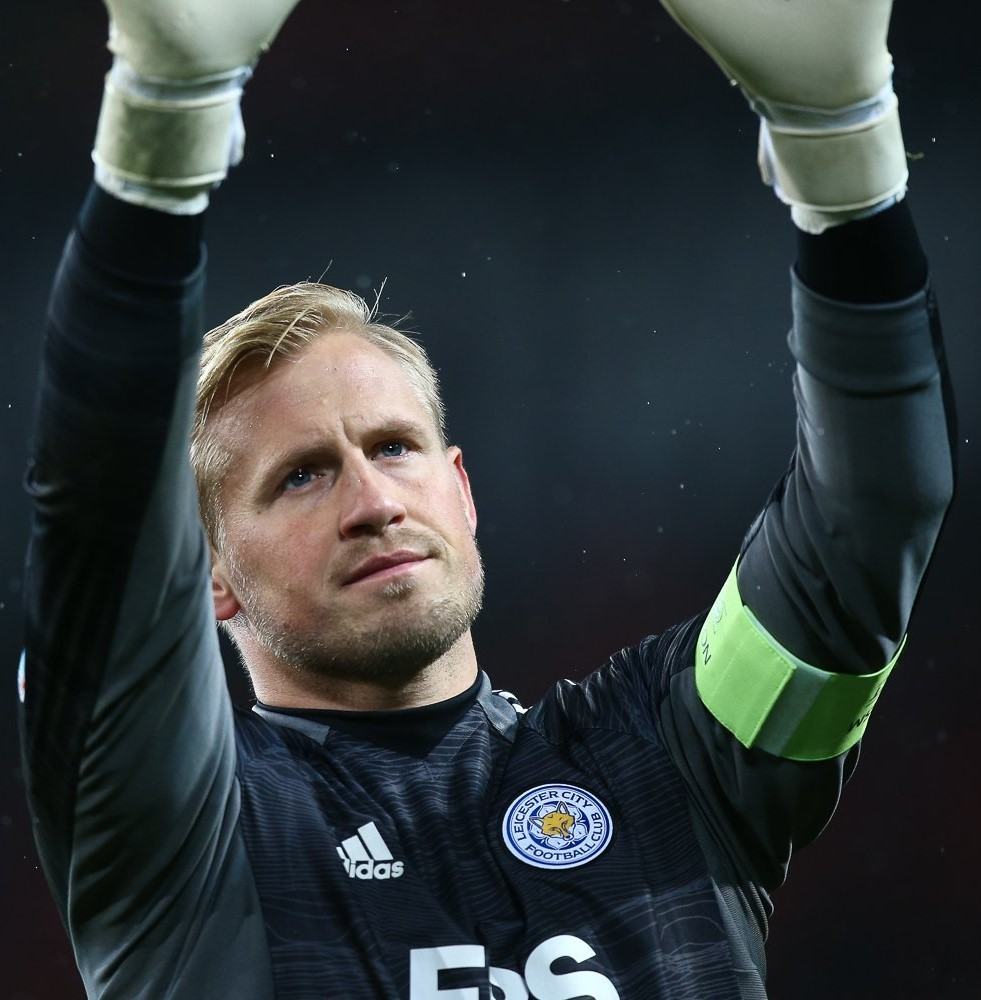
Kasper Schmeichel

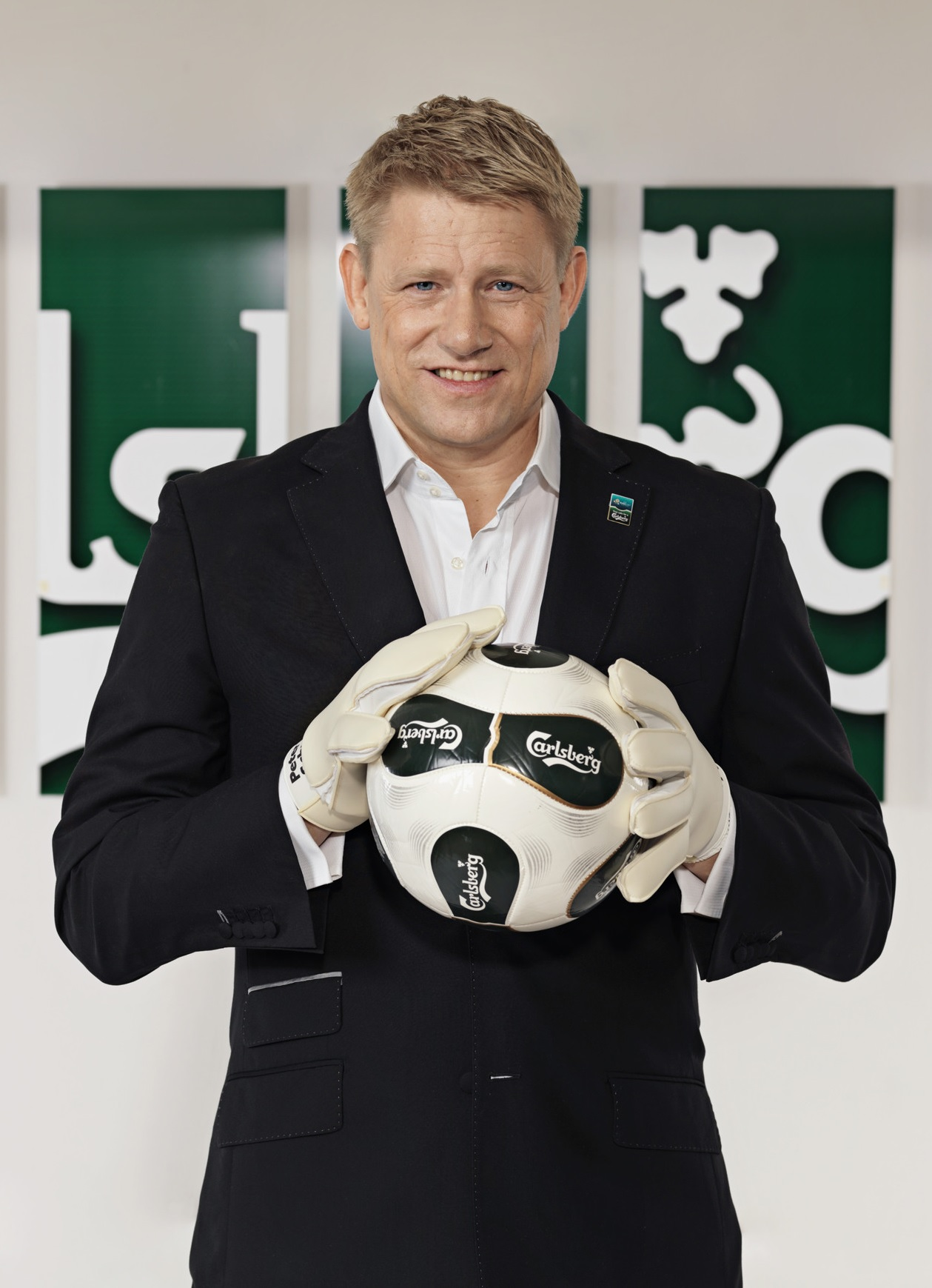
Peter Schmeichel

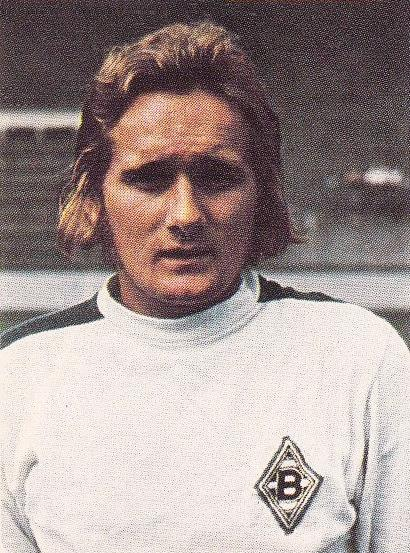
Allan Simonsen

- Daniel Agger, defender, Brøndby IF 2004–2006, 2014–2016; Liverpool F.C. 2006–2014
- Preben Arentoft, Greenock Morton, Newcastle United F.C., Blackburn Rovers F.C.
- Martin Arlofelt, defender
- Frank Arnesen
- Lars Bastrup
- Jashar Beluli
- Nicklas Bendtner, Arsenal F.C. 2006–2014; VfL Wolfsburg, 2014-2016
- Kresten Bjerre
- Per Bjerregaard
- Harald Bohr (1887–1951), Olympic silver medalist and mathematician; brother of Niels Bohr
- David Boysen (born1991), winger
- Tonny Brogaard, goalkeeper
- Charles Buchwald, Olympic two-time silver medalist
- Henrik Bundgaard, goalkeeper
- Frederik Christensen
- Nick Christensen, forward
- Tochi Chukwuani
- Sebastian Denius
- Preben Elkjær
- Christian Eriksen
- Martin Fisch
- Dalibor Gotovac, defender
- Thomas Gravesen
- Jacob Gregersen
- Jesper Grønkjær
- Morten Hamm
- John Hansen (born 1924)
- Johnny Hansen (born 1943)
- Karl Aage Hansen
- Ronni Hansen, midfielder
- Thomas Helveg
- Casper Hyltoft
- Henning Jensen
- John Jensen
- Martin Jørgensen
- Pauli Jørgensen
- Gökcan Kaya
- Simon Kjær
- Kasper Køhlert
- Nicolaj Køhlert
- Brian Laudrup, forward, Rangers F.C. 1994–1998; Euro 92
- Finn Laudrup
- Michael Laudrup, Juventus FC 1985–1989; FC Barcelona 1989–1994
- Martin Laursen
- Søren Lerby
- Marianne Løvendorf, defender
- Knud Lundberg
- Ole Madsen
- Nils Middelboe
- Kim Milton Nielsen referee
- Klaus Moesgaard
- Jan Mølby, player and manager
- Richard Møller Nielsen
- Allan Nielsen
- Harald Nielsen
- Casper Olesen
- Jesper Olsen
- Lars Olsen
- Morten Olsen, player and coach
- Flemming Østergaard
- Gitte Pedersen
- Christian Poulsen
- Roald Poulsen
- Flemming Povlsen
- Carl Aage Præst
- Erik Rasmussen
- Thomas Rohde
- Dennis Rommedahl
- Per Røntved
- Ebbe Sand
- Kasper Schmeichel
- Peter Schmeichel, goalkeeper, Manchester United 1991–1999; Euro 92, CL98/99
- Rang Shawkat, defender
- Allan Simonsen, 1977 World Footballer of the Year
- Emilio Simonsen
- Ebbe Skovdahl, manager, most notable for popularity at Aberdeen football club
- Jørgen Leschly Sørensen
- Thomas Sørensen, goalkeeper, Stoke City
- Jon Dahl Tomasson, forward, A.C. Milan 2003–2005, VfB Stuttgart 2005–2007, UEFA Cup 2002
- Stig Tøfting
- Simon Trier
- Kim Vilfort
- Michael Zacho

== Handball ==
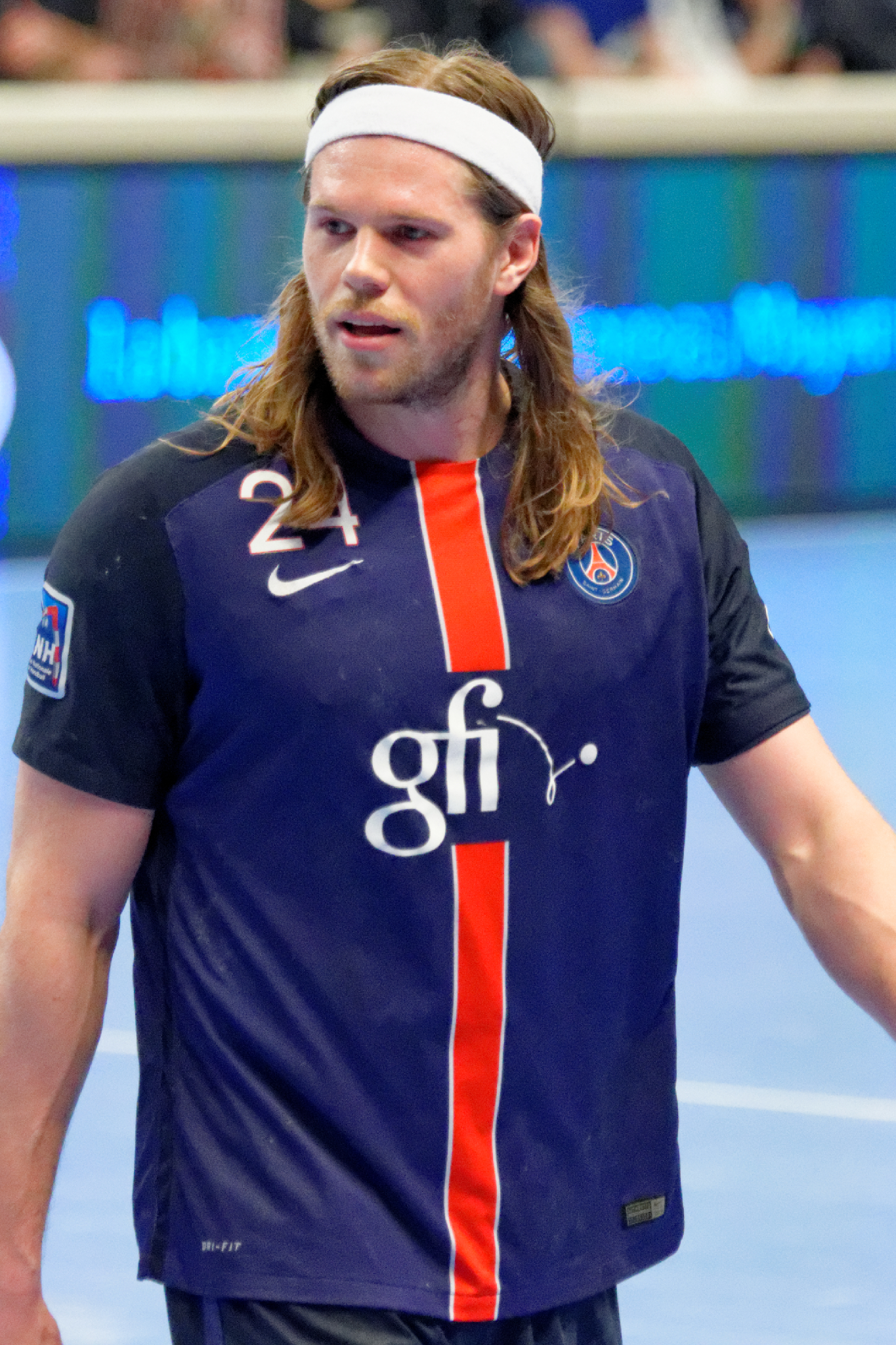
Mikkel Hansen

- Lars Agersted, right winger
- Anja Andersen, handball player; 1996 Olympic gold
- Anders Christensen, right winger
- Morten Stig Christensen, handball player turned TV host
- Mikael Fruelund, right back
- Kristian Gjessing, left back
- Simon Hammer, left winger
- Michael Sahl Hansen, playmaker and line player
- Mikkel Hansen, left back
- Anne Hykkelbjerg, line player
- Claus Kjeldgaard, centre back
- Simon Krogh, playmaker
- Sascha Juul, left winger
- Pelle Larsen, line player
- Nikoline Nielsen, left back
- Stefan Nielsen, left winger
- Jesper Storm, line player

== Ice hockey ==
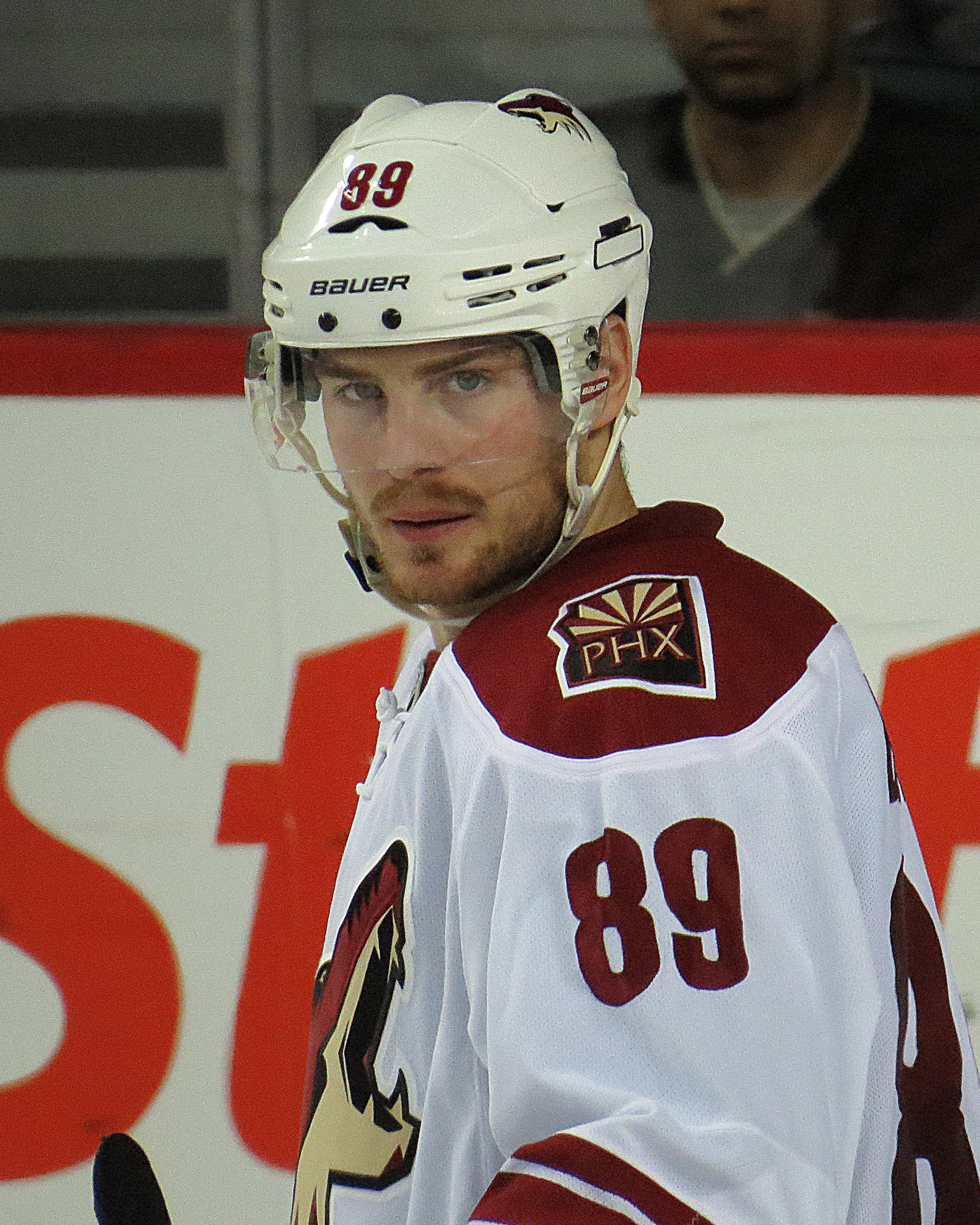
Mikkel Bødker

- Frederik Andersen, first Danish-born goalie to play in the NHL
- Mikkel Bødker, highest drafted (8th overall) Danish-born player
- Lars Eller, ice hockey player
- Jannik Hansen, first Danish citizen to play and register a goal in an NHL playoff game
- Philip Larsen, first Danish-born defenseman to play in the NHL
- Frans Nielsen, first Danish citizen to play in the NHL
- Poul Popiel, first Danish-born to play in the NHL
- Peter Regin, ice hockey player

== Motorsports ==
=== Automobile racing ===
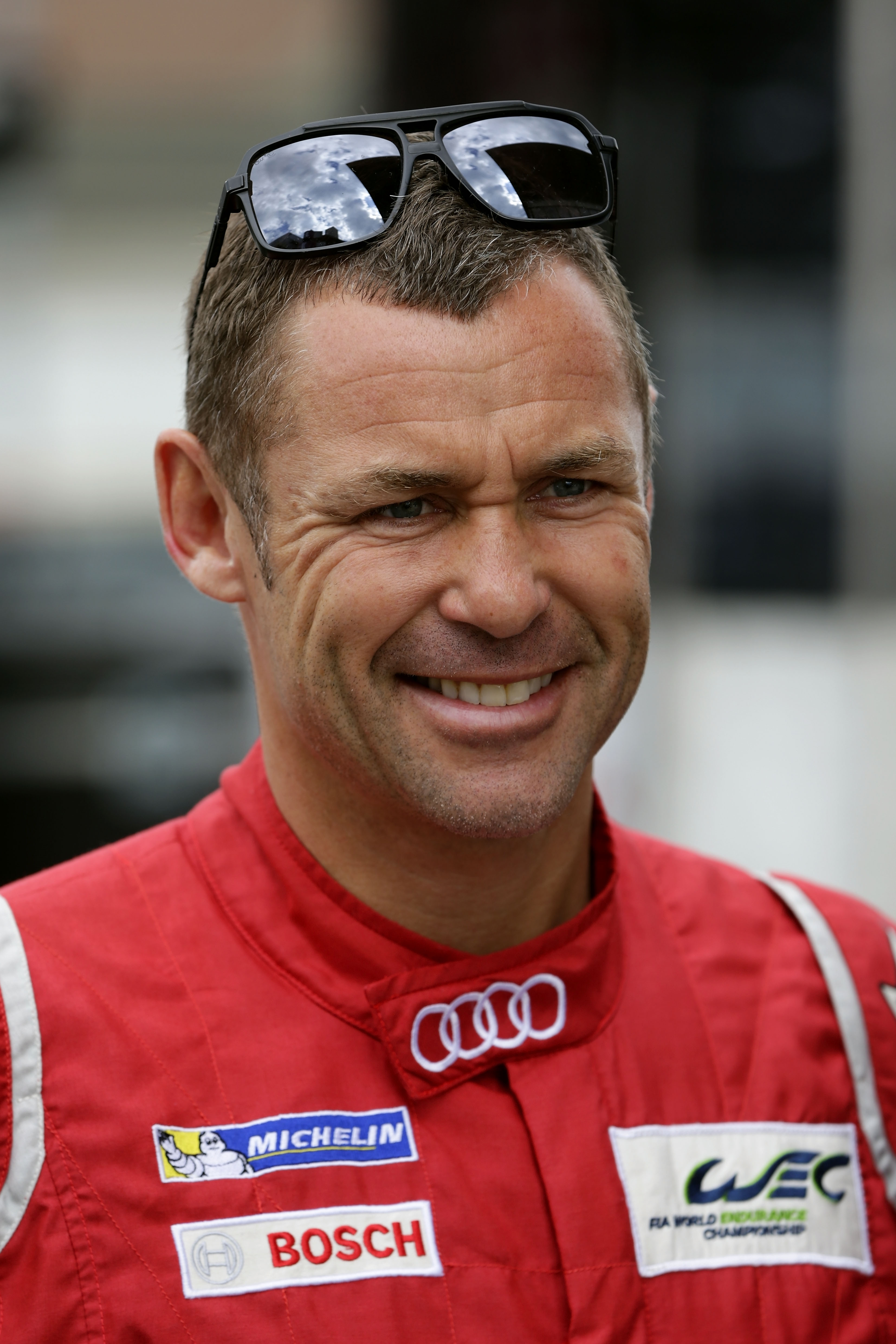
Tom Kristensen

- Michael Christensen, Porscheworks driver
- Casper Elgaard, 24 Hours of Le Mans driver
- Nicolas Kiesa, Formula One driver
- Tom Kristensen, only driver to win 24 Hours of Le Mans nine times (1997, 2000, 2001, 2002, 2003, 2004, 2005, 2008, 2013)
- Jan Magnussen, Formula One driver
- Kevin Magnussen, Formula One driver

=== Motorcycle speedway ===
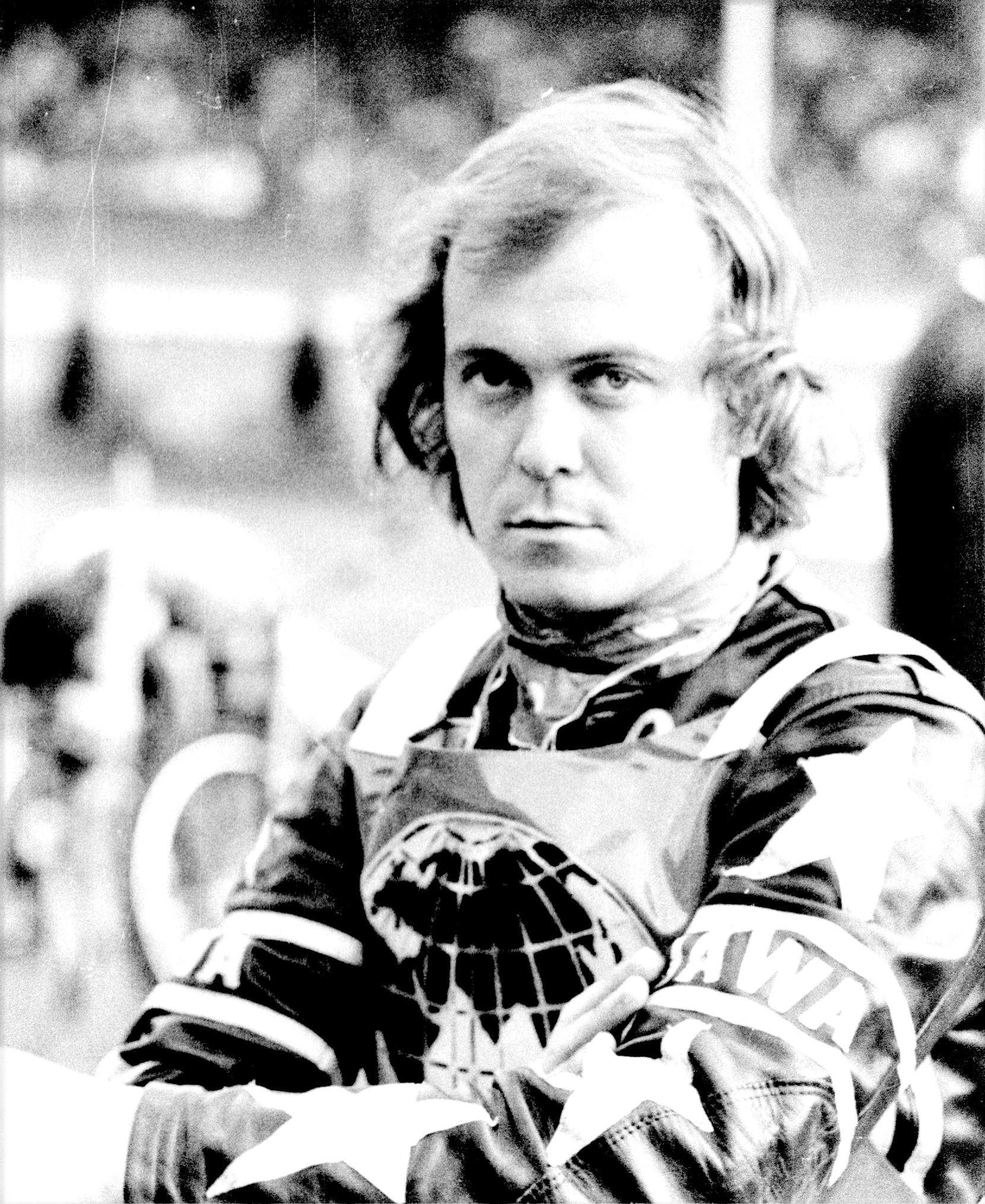
Ole Olsen

- Hans Andersen
- Kenneth Bjerre
- Erik Gundersen, three-time Speedway World Champion (1984, 1985, 1988)
- Hans Nielsen, four-time World Champion (1986, 1987, 1989, 1995); won the inaugural Speedway Grand Prix series in 1995
- Ole Olsen, three-time World Champion (1971, 1975, 1978); first Dane to win the Speedway World Championship
- Bjarne Pedersen
- Jan O. Pedersen, 1991 Speedway World Champion
- Nicki Pedersen, two-time World Champion (2007, 2008)
- Jonas Raun

== Rowing and sailing ==
- Jesper Bank, sailing 1992, 2000 Summer Olympics gold
- Eskild Ebbesen, gold medalist in rowing
- Paul Elvstrøm, sailing, 1948, 1952, 1956, 1960 Olympic gold

== Tennis ==
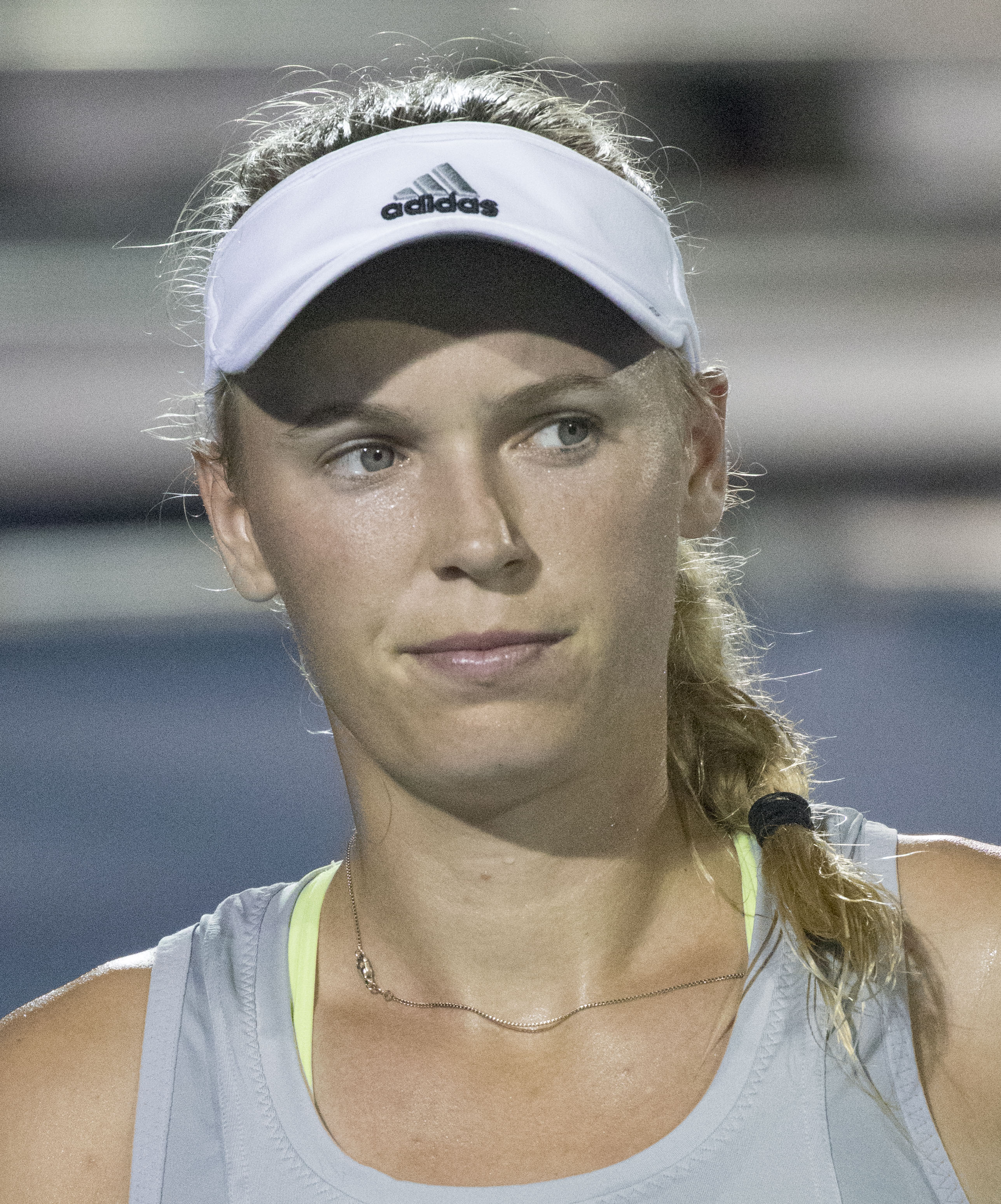
Caroline Wozniacki

- Kenneth Carlsen, No. 43 in men's singles in 1993
- Jan Leschly, No. 10in men's singles in 1967
- Frederik Løchte Nielsen, winner of Wimbledon 2012 Gentlemen's Doubles
- Holger Rune, No. 4 highest ranked male player
- Tine Scheuer-Larsen, No. 34 in women's singles in 1986
- Johanne Svendsen, four ITF titles
- Clara Tauson, No. 12 in women's singles in 2025
- Caroline Wozniacki, No. 1 in women's singles in 2010

== Wrestling ==
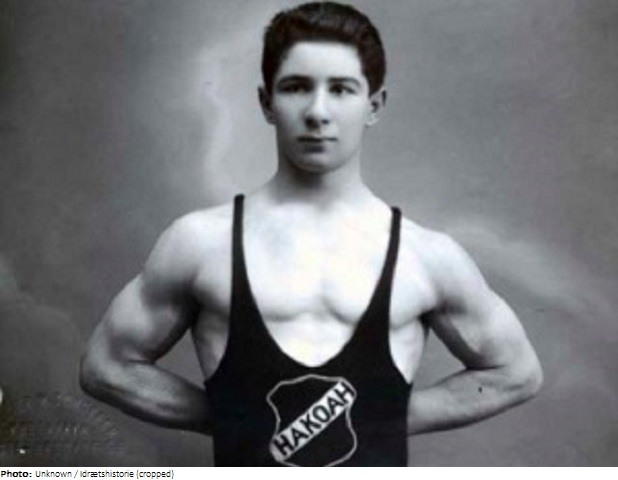
Abraham Kurland

- Leo Cortsen (1930–2007), Greco-Roman wrestler, appeared at the 1952 Summer Olympics
- Abraham Kurland (1912–1999), Greco-Roman wrestler, silver medalist at the 1932 Summer Olympics
- Carl Nelson, Greco-Roman wrestler, European welterweight champion
- Axel Tetens (1892–1961), Olympic wrestler
- Erik Thomsen (1935–2012), Olympic wrestler
- Svend Aage Thomsen (1918–1974), Olympic wrestler
- Aage Torgensen (1900–1932), Olympic wrestler
- Robert Voigt (1913–1988), Olympic wrestler

== Other ==
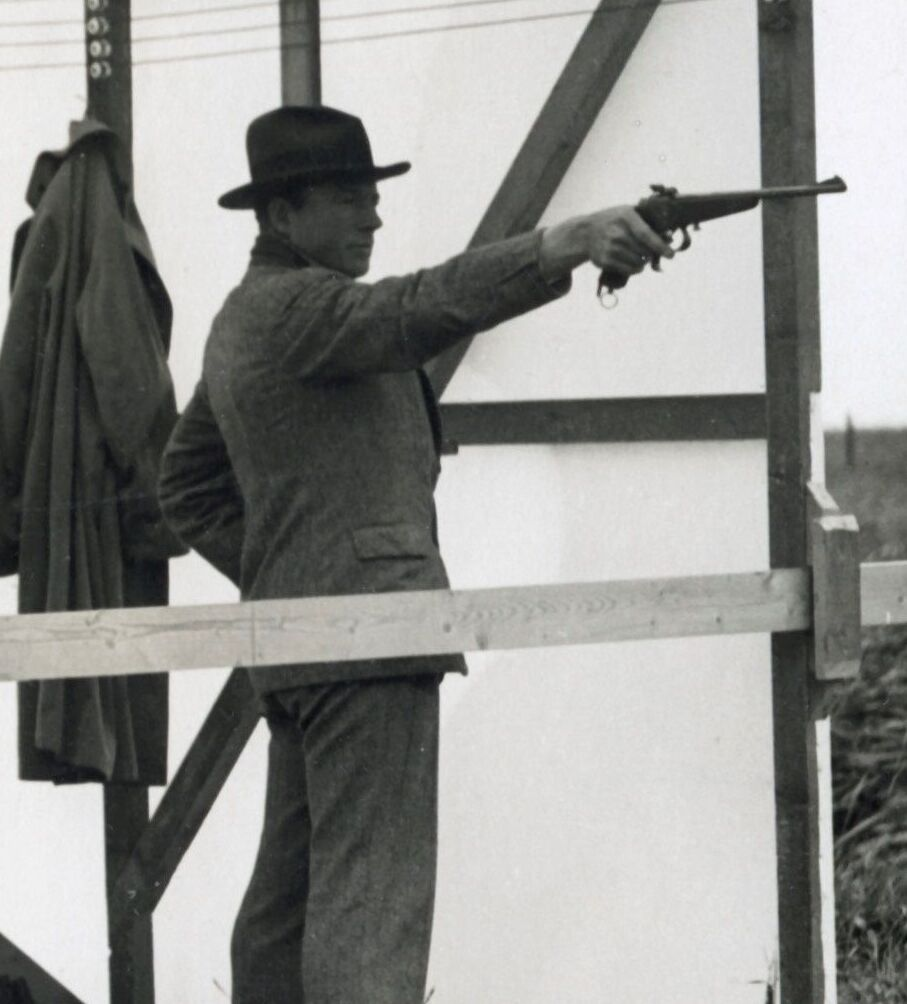
Otto Olsen

- Morten Andersen, American football, 2nd most points and field goals ever in the NFL
- Peter Eastgate, World Series of Poker main event champion
- Rune Glifberg, professional skateboarder
- Helle Gotved (1912–2006), developed a new approach to gymnastics
- Gus Hansen, high-stakes poker player
- Niels Holst-Sørensen, European champion athlete and commander-in-chief of the Royal Danish Air Force
- Martin Kampmann, mixed martial artist
- Oliver Venndt Kaszas, beach volleyball player
- Bent Larsen, 1956 International Grandmaster in chess
- Ole Laursen, kickboxer
- Gunnar Nielsen, runner; former world record holder over 1500 metres
- Otto Olsen, modern pentathlete
- Nicholas Pettas, kickboxer
- Mikael Lai Rasmussen, rugby union player
- Pernille Svarre, modern pentathlete
- Helle Trevino, IFBB professional bodybuilder

== See also ==
- Lists of sportspeople
