= 2015–16 SønderjyskE Fodbold season =

SønderjyskE
2015–16 season
- Manager: Jakob Michelsen
- Ground: Sydbank Park
- Danish Superliga: 2nd
- Danish Cup: Quarter-finals
- Top goalscorer: Johan Absalonsen (13)

The 2015–16 season was SønderjyskE's 8th consecutive season in the Danish Superliga.

== Season summary ==
SønderjyskE achieved their highest ever place in Danish football, finishing second. Although never really in contention for the title, in the last weeks of the season the team consolidated their position, finishing nine points behind champions F.C. Copenhagen. As a result, SønderjyskE qualified for continental competition for the first time in their history, entering the Europa League in the second qualifying round.

== Players ==
=== First-team squad ===
Squad at end of season

Note: Flags indicate national team as defined under FIFA eligibility rules; some limited exceptions apply. Players may hold more than one non-FIFA nationality.

No.	Pos.	Nation	Player
1	GK	(Croatia) CRO	Marin Skender
2	DF	(Portugal) POR	João Pereira
3	DF	(Denmark) DEN	Marc Pedersen
5	DF	(Netherlands) NED	Kees Luijckx
6	MF	(Sweden) SWE	Simon Kroon
7	DF	(Denmark) DEN	Marc Dal Hende (captain)
8	MF	(Denmark) DEN	Janus Drachmann
9	FW	(Denmark) DEN	Tommy Bechmann
10	MF	(Denmark) DEN	Nicolaj Madsen
11	MF	(Denmark) DEN	Johan Absalonsen
12	DF	(Denmark) DEN	Søren Mussmann
13	MF	(Denmark) DEN	Casper Olesen
14	DF	(Denmark) DEN	Mikkel Hedegaard

No.	Pos.	Nation	Player
15	MF	(Denmark) DEN	Troels Kløve
16	MF	(Denmark) DEN	Sebastian Sommer
18	MF	(Burkina Faso) BFA	Adama Guira
20	DF	(Ghana) GHA	Francis Dickoh (Note: Dickoh was born in Copenhagen, Denmark, but also qualified to represent Ghana internationally through his parents and made his international debut for Ghana in November 2005.)
21	DF	(Denmark) DEN	Jeppe Simonsen (Note: Simonsen was born in Kolding, Denmark, and represented Denmark at U-20 and U-21 level, but also qualified to represent Haiti internationally through his biological parents and made his international debut for Haiti in June 2021.)
23	MF	(Zimbabwe) ZIM	Silas Songani
24	MF	(Denmark) DEN	Andreas Oggesen
25	MF	(Uganda) UGA	Emmanuel Okwi
26	DF	(Denmark) DEN	Pierre Kanstrup
28	GK	(Denmark) DEN	Jens Rinke
30	MF	(Denmark) DEN	Marcel Rømer
33	FW	(Denmark) DEN	Thomas Dalgaard

=== Left club during season ===
Note: Flags indicate national team as defined under FIFA eligibility rules; some limited exceptions apply. Players may hold more than one non-FIFA nationality.

No.	Pos.	Nation	Player
4	DF	(Iceland) ISL	Baldur Sigurðsson (to Stjarnan)
6	MF	(Denmark) DEN	Bo Storm (released)
17	MF	(Morocco) MAR	Ayoub Sørensen (released)

No.	Pos.	Nation	Player
20	DF	(Denmark) DEN	Bjorn Paulsen (to Esbjerg)
22	FW	(Denmark) DEN	Kåre Jensen (released)
29	DF	(Denmark) DEN	Morten Beck (released)

== Results ==
=== Danish Superliga ===
==== League table ====
Pos	Team	Pld	W	D	L	GF	GA	GD	Pts	Qualification or relegation
1	Copenhagen (C)	33	21	8	4	62	28	+34	71	Qualification for the Champions League second qualifying round (Note: Copenhagen qualified for the Europa League second qualifying round by winning the 2015–16 Danish Cup. However, since they already qualified for European competition based on their league position, the spot awarded to the cup winners was passed down the league.)
2	SønderjyskE	33	19	5	9	56	36	+20	62	Qualification for the Europa League second qualifying round
3	Midtjylland	33	17	8	8	57	33	+24	59	Qualification for the Europa League first qualifying round
4	Brøndby	33	16	6	11	43	37	+6	54	Qualification for the Europa League first qualifying round
5	AaB	33	15	5	13	56	44	+12	50	

Source: DBU, Soccerway
Rules for classification: 1) Points; 2) Goal difference; 3) Goals scored; 4) Head-to-head points; 5) Head-to-head goal difference; 6) Head-to-head goals scored; 7) Head-to-head away goals scored; 8) Play-off on neutral ground (only if rankings are important for medals, teams for relegation or teams for UEFA competitions); 9) Draw.
(C) Champions
