= Nikoline Nielsen =

Nikoline Nielsen may refer to:

- Nikoline Nielsen (businesswoman) (1874–1951), Danish businesswoman
- Nikoline Nielsen (handballer) (born 1987), Danish handballer
- Nikoline Nielsen (footballer) (born 2009), Danish footballer
