= Nikoline =

Nikoline is a feminine given name. Notable people with the given name include:

- Ragnhild Nikoline Andersen (1907–1990), Danish trade unionist, politician, communist
- Nikoline Hansen (born 2002), Danish beauty pageant titleholder, Miss Denmark 2023
- Nikoline Harbitz (1841–1898), Norwegian author
- Nikoline Lundgreen (born 1998), Danish handball player
- Nikoline Nielsen (businesswoman) (1874–1951), Danish businesswoman, long associated with Faxe Bryggeri
- Nikoline Nielsen (handballer) (born 1987), Danish former handball player

== See also ==
- Nicoline, given name page
