= Gotovac =

Gotovac is a surname commonly found in Croatia and may refer to:

- Dalibor Gotovac (born 1979), Danish footballer
- Frano Gotovac (1928–1991), Croatian architect and comic artist
- Jakov Gotovac (1895–1982), Croatian composer and conductor
- Mani Gotovac (1939-2019), Croatian playwright and theatrologist
- Pero Gotovac (1927-2017), Croatian composer
- Tomislav Gotovac (1937-2010), Croatian multimedia artist
- Vlado Gotovac (1930–2000), Croatian poet and politician
