= Stefan Nielsen =

Stefan Nielsen may refer to:

- Stefan Nielsen (handballer) (born 1986), Danish handballer
- Stefan Nielsen (speedway rider) (born 1994), British speedway rider
- Stefan Nielsen, Danish musician, member of Rollo & King

== See also ==
- Stefan Nilsson (disambiguation)
