= Christian Eriksen =

Danish footballer (born 1992)

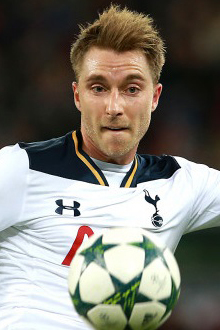
- Eriksen playing for Tottenham Hotspur in 2016

Personal information
- Full name: Christian Dannemann Eriksen
- Date of birth: 14 February 1992 (age 34)
- Place of birth: Middelfart, Denmark
- Height: 1.82 m (6 ft 0 in)
- Position: Midfielder

Youth career
- 1995–2005: Middelfart G&BK
- 2005–2008: OB
- 2008–2010: Ajax

Senior career*
Years	Team	Apps	(Gls)
2010–2013	Ajax	113	(25)
2013–2020	Tottenham Hotspur	226	(51)
2020–2021	Inter Milan	43	(4)
2022	Brentford	11	(1)
2022–2025	Manchester United	73	(3)
2025–2026	VfL Wolfsburg	31	(3)

International career^{‡}
2007–2009	Denmark U17	27	(9)
2009	Denmark U18	5	(1)
2009	Denmark U19	3	(1)
2011	Denmark U21	3	(1)
2010–	Denmark	151	(46)
- * Club domestic league appearances and goals as of 17:30, 16 May 2026 (UTC) ‡ National team caps and goals as of 23:37, 7 June 2026 (UTC)

Christian Dannemann Eriksen (Danish pronunciation: [ˈkʰʁɛs.tjæn ˈeː.ʁɛg.sən]; born 14 February 1992) is a Danish professional footballer who plays as a midfielder for the Denmark national team.

Eriksen began his senior club career at age 18 in 2010, playing for Ajax, where he won three Eredivisie titles and the KNVB Cup. In 2013, Eriksen signed for Tottenham Hotspur in a transfer worth £11 million (€12.45 million), where he was twice named the club's Player of the Year, was voted into the 2017–18 PFA Team of the Year, and later also reached the 2019 UEFA Champions League final. In 2020, Eriksen joined Inter Milan in a transfer worth €19.7 million (£16.9 million), and won a Serie A title.

During a UEFA Euro 2020 match on 12 June 2021, Eriksen collapsed on the pitch after suffering a cardiac arrest; he was given CPR and was later fitted with an ICD. He returned to football eight months later with a move to Premier League club Brentford, before transferring to Manchester United the following season. At United, he won an FA Cup and EFL Cup before departing the club after the 2024–25 season. He collapsed again during an international friendly against Ukraine on 7 June 2026.

Eriksen made his senior international debut for Denmark in 2010 at age 18, and is currently the nation's record appearance holder with more than 150 caps, including appearing in six major tournaments; he was also the youngest player at the 2010 FIFA World Cup. (Note: Eriksen is the youngest Danish player to have reached 100 caps at 28 years and 243 days. The first Dane was Morten Olsen in 1989.)

== Club career ==
=== Middelfart and Odense ===
Born in Middelfart, Denmark, Eriksen followed in the footsteps of his father Thomas when he started playing football in the academy of local side, Middelfart G&BK. Eriksen's father was also one of the coaches at the time and in 2004 they helped the youth side finish unbeaten in the local youth championship for the third time in a period of four years.

The following year, he joined OB, who competed in the Danish youth championships, and within a year had helped the club to an age-group title. It was at OB that Eriksen first began showing signs of his technical ability, with his dribbling and free-kick techniques lauded by then-coach, Tonny Hermansen. His form at youth level attracted the attention of a number of major European clubs, including the likes of Chelsea and Barcelona. Eriksen ultimately underwent trials with both clubs as well as Real Madrid, Manchester United and Milan, but finally decided to move to Ajax, stating, "My first step should not be too big. I knew that playing in the Netherlands would be very good for my development. Then Ajax arrived and that was a fantastic option."

=== Ajax ===
==== 2008–2010: Youth and first-team squad ====
On 17 October 2008, Eriksen signed a two-and-a-half-year contract with Amsterdam-based club, Ajax. The transfer fee received by OB was estimated at €1 million (£847,199) while Middelfart also received a sum of €35 000 which they later used to construct a football pitch. He worked his way through the youth teams at Ajax and was promoted to the first team squad in January 2010, where he was given the number 51 shirt. Later that month, he made his first team debut in a 1–1 Eredivisie with NAC Breda.

He scored his first goal for Ajax on 25 March in a 6–0 win over Go Ahead Eagles in the Dutch Cup and extended his contract with the club the following month. On 6 May, he played in the second match of the final of the 2009–10 Dutch Cup as Ajax beat Feyenoord 4–1, prevailing 6–1 on aggregate. At the end of his first professional season with the club, Eriksen had played 21 competitive matches, scoring one goal, and had made his international debut for Denmark. Eriksen's form throughout the campaign earned praise from manager Martin Jol who compared him to former youth products Wesley Sneijder and Rafael van der Vaart as well as Danish legend, Michael Laudrup for his reading of the game in the traditional number 10 role.

==== 2010–2013: Breakthrough years ====
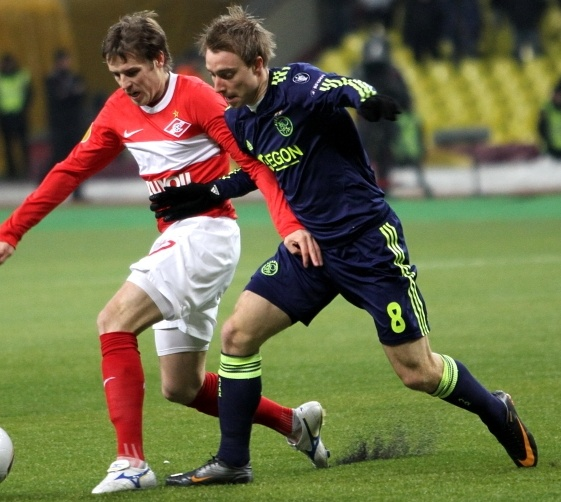
Eriksen (right) playing for Ajax in 2011

Eriksen took the number eight jersey ahead of the following campaign and began the 2010–11 season well, scoring his first Ajax league goal on 29 August 2010 in an away victory over De Graafschap. Over the course of the next few months, he scored his first home goal at the Amsterdam Arena, in a 3–0 Cup victory over BV Veendam, and his first European goal, in a 3–0 UEFA Europa League win over Anderlecht.

In between the milestone goals, Eriksen was also named Danish Talent of the Year. His growing capabilities as the team's playmaker saw him become an undisputed starter in the side and he helped Ajax to their first Eredivisie title in seven years. At the end of the season he was named Ajax's Talent of the Year. His form throughout the campaign also earned him the Dutch Football Talent of the Year award which saw him become only the second Danish player to win the award since Jon Dahl Tomasson in 1996. Johan Cruyff, whose panel selected Eriksen for the award, described Eriksen as a typical product of the Danish school and added to previous comparisons between him and Brian and Michael Laudrup.

On 18 October 2011, Eriksen scored his first goal in the UEFA Champions League when Ajax beat Dinamo Zagreb 2–0 in the group stage. In the return fixture the following month, he provided assists to teammates Gregory van der Wiel and Siem de Jong as Ajax recorded a 4–0 victory. Five days later he was named Danish Football Player of the Year in recognition of his role in helping Ajax to the league title the season before and in Denmark's successful UEFA Euro 2012 qualification campaign. Eriksen continued to impress for Ajax and his strong contribution, both in terms of goal and assist returns, helped the club to a second consecutive league title.

Eriksen and Ajax repeated the feat in the 2012–13 season following which he opted not to renew his contract with the club. With only one year remaining on his current contract, Eriksen was permitted to search for a new club and he agreed terms with Tottenham Hotspur in England. Eriksen departed Ajax having made 162 appearances across all competitions and scored 32 goals. Along with his league success, he had also featured in three consecutive editions of the Johan Cruyff Shield, which Ajax won once.

=== Tottenham Hotspur ===
==== 2013–2016: Premier League introduction and League Cup runner-up ====
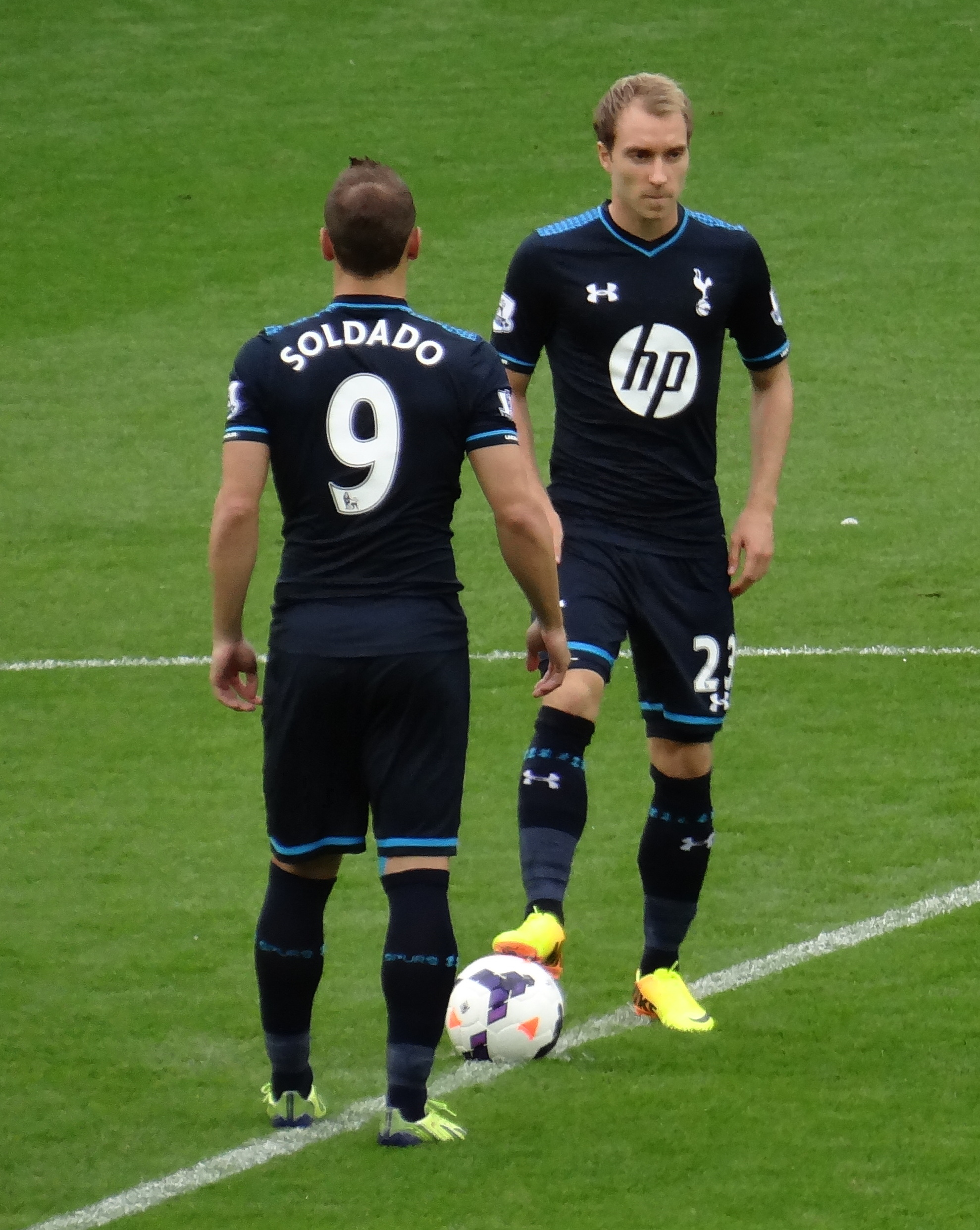
Eriksen (right) preparing to kick off for Tottenham Hotspur in 2013

On 30 August 2013, Premier League club Tottenham Hotspur announced that they had completed the transfer of Eriksen from Ajax in a deal believed to be worth £11 million (€12.45 million). Eriksen joined the club on the same day as Erik Lamela, who joined from Roma, and Vlad Chiricheș, who joined from Steaua București, and took the club's total spending for the 2013 summer transfer window to £109.5 million.

He made his league debut against Norwich City on 14 September and provided an assist for Gylfi Sigurðsson in a 2–0 victory. After the match, Spurs manager André Villas-Boas commented: "It was a great debut for Christian, he is a pure number 10, a creative player and his individual quality made all the difference."

Five days later, Eriksen "clipped a wonderful dipping shot" over the goalkeeper to score his first Tottenham goal and complete a 3–0 win over Tromsø IL in the Europa League. He added to his Tottenham goal tally with a goal from a free kick in a 1–1 draw against West Bromwich Albion on Boxing Day 2013, and the second goal in Spurs' 1–2 away win against Manchester United on 1 January 2014. On 23 March and two goals down against Southampton at White Hart Lane, Eriksen scored twice to level the score and then assisted Sigurðsson to score the winning goal.

He continued his goalscoring form on 12 April when he scored a stoppage-time equaliser to help Tottenham come from 3–0 down to draw 3–3 at West Brom. By the end of the season, he had scored 10 goals and registered 13 assists across all competitions, won the Danish Football Player of the Year award and was named Tottenham's Player of the Season.

Ahead of the 2014–15 campaign, Tottenham appointed Mauricio Pochettino as new club manager after the unsuccessful period under Villas-Boas and interim-manager Tim Sherwood. Between November and December 2014, Eriksen scored late winners against Aston Villa, Hull City and Swansea City which he credited to the Argentine manager for raising the team's fitness levels. By the end of the calendar year, Eriksen had scored 12 goals from open play – more than any other player in England – and was soon after awarded his second consecutive Danish Footballer of the Year award.

On 28 January 2015, Eriksen scored twice in a 2–2 (3–2 aggregate) win over Sheffield United to send Tottenham into the League Cup Final. His first goal, a 30-yard curling free kick, was later lauded by former professionals Michael Owen and Gary Neville. The final, played against London rivals Chelsea, took place on 1 March and ended in a 2–0 defeat for Tottenham. Eriksen completed the 2014–15 campaign having featured in every Premier League game for Mauricio Pochettino, starting all-but one match, and scored 12 goals across all competitions.

On 9 June 2015, amid speculation that he would be joining Manchester United, Eriksen confirmed to Danish media whilst on international duty that he would stay at Tottenham for the foreseeable future and was quoted as saying: "I feel right at home at Tottenham and I haven't thought about leaving yet." He did in fact remain with the club and scored his first goals of the season in October, netting from two free-kicks in a 2–2 draw with Swansea.

In January 2016, Eriksen was once again named Danish Footballer of the Year. In doing so he became the first ever player to win the award in three consecutive years. He ultimately scored 6 goals and registered 13 assists as Tottenham ended the league season in third place, thereby qualifying for the following season's Champions League campaign.

==== 2016–2020: Premier League runner-up and PFA Team of the Year ====
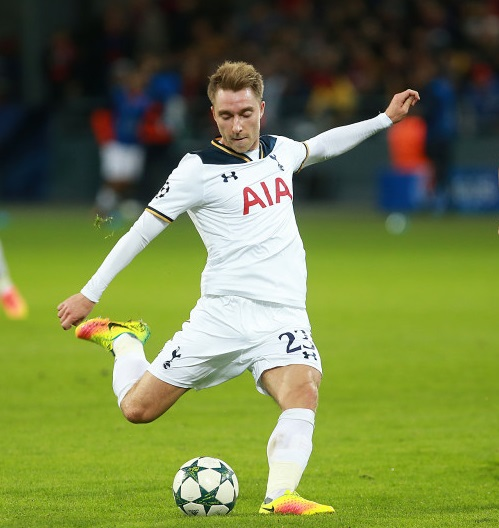
Eriksen playing for Tottenham Hotspur in 2016

Ahead of the following season, Eriksen signed a new long-term contract with Tottenham and starred once again for the club, scoring eight goals and assisting a further 15 as the club ended the league campaign as runners-up to champions Chelsea. Eriksen's tally of assists was bettered only by Manchester City's Kevin De Bruyne who set up 18 goals for the season. Eriksen also recorded the joint-most assists in the FA Cup and later won the Tottenham Player of the Season award, claiming the award for the second time after previously winning it in his debut season with the club.

Eriksen broke the record for the most goals scored by a Danish player in the Premier League when he scored his 33rd goal in a 3–2 win over West Ham United on 23 September 2017, surpassing the record previously held by Nicklas Bendtner. On 9 December, he made his 200th appearance for Tottenham and marked the occasion by scoring in a 5–1 league win over Stoke City. The following month, he scored his 50th goal for the club when he scored after just 11 seconds in the 2–0 league win over Manchester United. Eriksen's goal was the third-fastest goal ever scored in the Premier League, bettered only by Alan Shearer and former Spurs captain Ledley King.

On 17 March 2018, Eriksen scored twice in an FA Cup match against Swansea to send Spurs to the semi-final for the second season running. On 1 April, Eriksen scored a 25-yard goal in the away match against Chelsea, helping Tottenham to their first win in 28 years at Stamford Bridge in a match that finished 3–1. Later that month, in the reverse fixture against Stoke, Eriksen scored twice to earn Tottenham a 2–1 win. Following the match, teammate Harry Kane, who was challenging for the season's Golden Boot award, claimed to have made the last touch on the ball for the second goal. Tottenham appealed to the Premier League panel who agreed that the ball touched Kane's shoulder and awarded him the goal. On 14 April, Eriksen was named in the PFA Team of the Year for the first time, alongside teammates Kane and Jan Vertonghen.

In the 2018–19 season, Eriksen scored his first goal of the season in a Champions League away match against Inter Milan. The match ended in a 2–1 loss for Tottenham, but in the home game against Inter, Eriksen scored again in the only goal of the game, giving Tottenham a 1–0 victory. He scored his first Premier League goal of the season on 15 December 2018 in the home match against Burnley, a late goal that earned Tottenham a 1–0 win. On 31 March, during a 2–1 defeat to Liverpool, he became only the second player after David Beckham to record 10+ assists in four successive Premier League seasons. Three days later, on the occasion of his 200th Premier League appearance, he assisted Son Heung-min for the first ever goal at the new Tottenham Hotspur Stadium before scoring a goal of his own in a 2–0 win over Crystal Palace. On 23 April, he scored the winning goal in a 1–0 win over Brighton & Hove Albion. Later on, Eriksen played in the 2019 UEFA Champions League Final, which resulted a 2–0 defeat for Tottenham against Liverpool.

=== Inter Milan ===
On 28 January 2020, with his contract at Tottenham set to expire in six months, Eriksen signed a four-and-a-half-year deal with Serie A club Inter Milan that would earn him €10 million per season. He made his club debut the following day, coming on as a second-half substitute for Alexis Sánchez in 2–1 home win over Fiorentina in the Coppa Italia quarter-finals.

On 20 February, Eriksen scored his first goal for the club, netting the opener in a 2–0 away victory over Ludogorets Razgrad in the Europa League. He scored his first Serie A goal on 1 July, in a 6–0 win against Brescia. On 21 August, Eriksen played in Inter's 3–2 loss against Sevilla in the 2020 Europa League Final, becoming the first player to lose two consecutive finals in the two current major UEFA competitions; (Note: Zinedine Zidane was the first player to lose two consecutive European club finals in two different competitions (with Bordeaux in the 1996 UEFA Cup Final and with Juventus in the 1997 UEFA Champions League Final).) he had lost the 2019 Champions League Final with Tottenham the previous year.

In December 2020, Giuseppe Marotta confirmed that Eriksen had been added to the transfer list for 2021; however, his teammate Romelu Lukaku had previously hinted that Eriksen's struggles at the Italian club were due to the language barrier. On 26 January 2021, in the final minutes of Inter's Coppa Italia quarter-final match against rivals Milan, Eriksen was subbed on with the score at 1–1. In the seventh minute of stoppage time and with the game seemingly headed for extra time, he scored his first goal of the season from a direct free kick to win the match for Inter and send them through to the semi-finals. Following the match, Inter manager Antonio Conte said that Eriksen would remain with the club, despite being linked with a winter departure. On 1 May, he scored Inter's first goal in an important 2–0 away win over Crotone, bringing the club closer to their first league title since 2009–10. Inter were confirmed as league champions the following day, after closest challengers Atalanta failed to win their match against Sassuolo. It ended Juventus's nine-year grasp on the Serie A title.

On 29 October 2021, it was announced that Eriksen was not permitted to play in the Serie A due to the presence of an implantable cardioverter-defibrillator he had implanted after suffering a cardiac arrest during a game at UEFA Euro 2020. Close to half a year after his cardiac arrest, Eriksen began individual training at the facilities of his youth academy team OB in Odense in preparation for a possible comeback to football. On 17 December 2021, Inter confirmed they had terminated their contract with Eriksen.

=== Brentford ===
On 31 January 2022, Eriksen signed for Premier League club Brentford on a six-month contract. On 26 February 2022, his first appearance was as a substitute in a 2–0 defeat to Newcastle United. He replaced Mathias Jensen, who came on in Eriksen's place in the game in which he suffered a cardiac arrest. He recorded his first assist since his cardiac arrest in a 2–0 win over Burnley on 12 March.

He scored his first goal back in the Premier League in a 4–1 away win against West London rivals Chelsea on 2 April, helping the Bees secure their first victory over Chelsea since 1939. Between the date of Eriksen's Brentford debut and the end of the season, only Kevin De Bruyne and Martin Ødegaard created more chances in the Premier League.

=== Manchester United ===
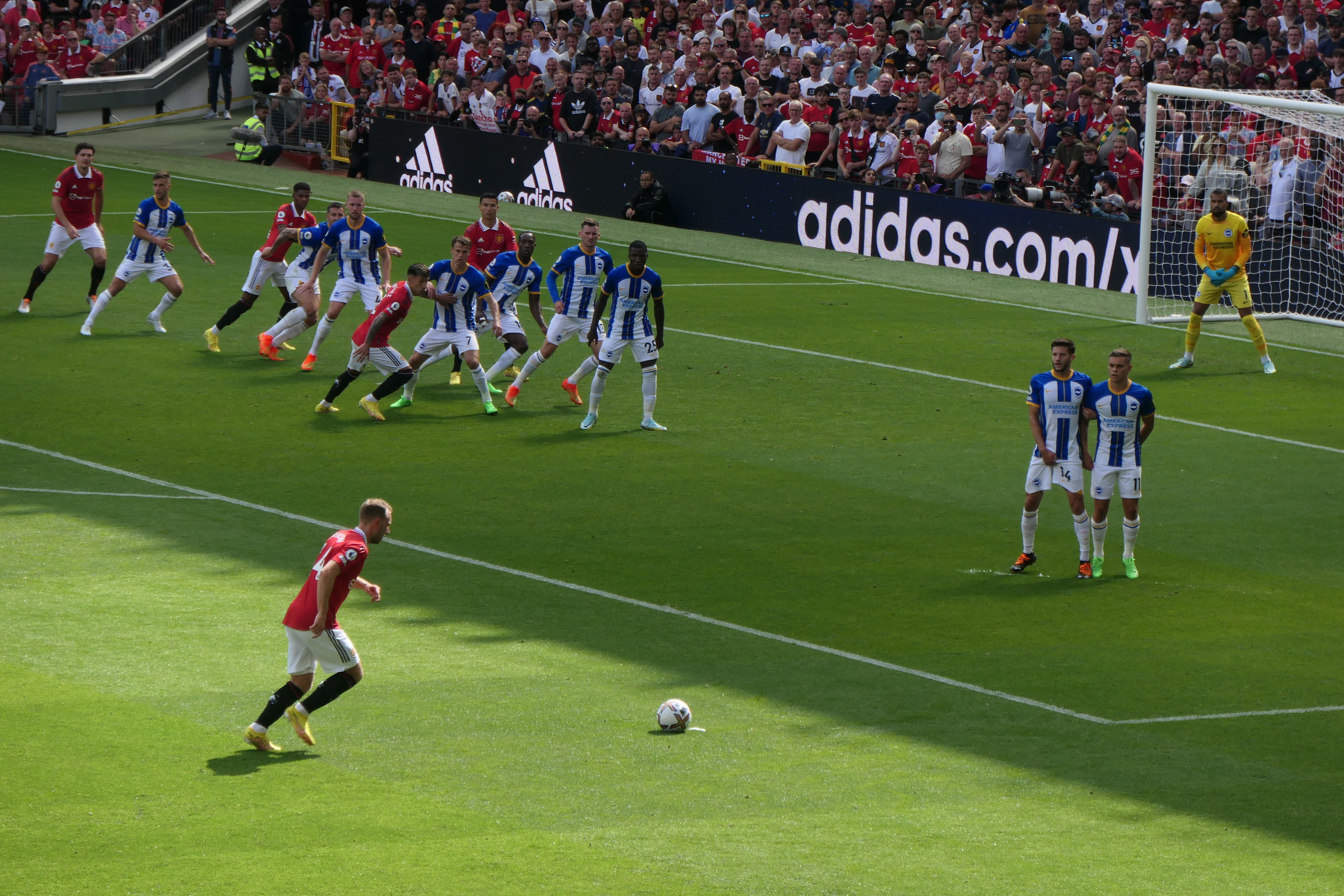
Eriksen taking a free kick for Manchester United on the opening day of the 2022–23 Premier League season

On 15 July 2022, Manchester United announced they had reached an agreement to sign Eriksen on a three-year deal. On 28 July, it was confirmed that he would wear the number 14 shirt. On 7 August, Eriksen made his debut in a 2–1 home loss against Brighton & Hove Albion in the Premier League. He provided his first assist in a 3–1 home league victory over rivals Arsenal, setting up Marcus Rashford's second goal. He scored his first goal for the club in a 2–1 away league victory over Fulham. Despite missing the final due to an ankle injury, Eriksen was a key part of United's 2022–23 EFL Cup winning side, having scored his first home goal for the club in a 2–0 fourth round win over Burnley at Old Trafford.

In late May 2025, it was announced that Eriksen would depart the club upon the expiration of his contract at the conclusion of the 2024–25 season. His last match with United was on 25 May against Aston Villa; Eriksen scored a penalty to help United win 2–0 on the last weekend of the Premier League season.

=== VfL Wolfsburg ===
On 10 September 2025, Eriksen joined Bundesliga side VfL Wolfsburg on a two-year contract, with the option of a further year's extension. He made his debut for Wolfsburg in a 1–0 loss to Borussia Dortmund on 21 September, and later scored his first goal for the club in a 2–1 victory over St. Pauli on 14 January 2026.

On 23 September 2026, Eriksen and VfL Wolfsburg mutually agreed to terminate his contract, having not played since his collapse in June.

== International career ==
=== Youth ===
Eriksen was called up to the Denmark national under-17 football team in July 2007, and impressed in his debut for the team on 31 July. In 2008, he scored eight goals in 16 games for the U-17s, and was named Danish U-17 Talent of the Year by the Danish FA. He was also one of four nominees for the 2008 Danish Talent of the Year award, which was won by Mathias Jørgensen.

He played 27 games for the under-17 team until February 2009. He played a total of eight games for the Denmark U-18 and Denmark U-19 teams during 2009. Eriksen was also called up for the Danish U-21 squad to the European championship in Denmark in 2011, the Danish team only participated in the group stage and Eriksen scored a goal against Belarus.

=== Senior ===
==== Early career ====
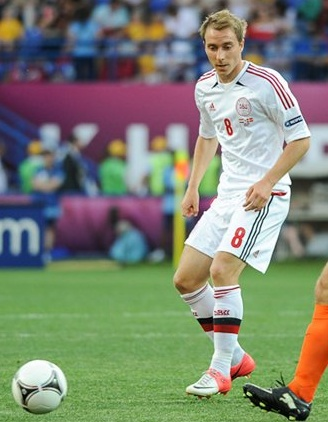
Eriksen playing for Denmark at UEFA Euro 2012

Eriksen received his first senior Denmark call-up in February 2010, making his debut in Denmark's friendly match against Austria in March, to become Denmark's fourth youngest full international, being the youngest debutant since Michael Laudrup.

On 28 May 2010, Denmark coach Morten Olsen announced that Eriksen would be part of the final squad of 23 participating in the 2010 FIFA World Cup in South Africa. He was the youngest player participating in the tournament. At the World Cup, Eriksen played two matches, against the Netherlands and Japan, but Denmark were unable to progress beyond the group stage.

On 9 February 2011, in a 2–1 friendly loss at home against England, Eriksen was named man of the match, and was praised for his performance by a number of prominent footballing figures, including Chelsea star Frank Lampard, Man Utd star Rio Ferdinand (on Twitter), manager Morten Olsen and several media experts in Denmark and England.

On 4 June 2011, Eriksen scored his first national team goal to give Denmark a 2–0 lead over Iceland in their UEFA Euro 2012 qualifier. In doing so, he became the youngest Danish player ever to score a goal in European qualification, being nine days younger than Michael Laudrup when he scored his first goal in 1983.

==== 2018 FIFA World Cup ====
In the build-up to the 2018 FIFA World Cup, Denmark were drawn in UEFA Group E alongside the likes of Poland and Romania. Eriksen played a key-role during the nation's qualification campaign during which time he scored eight goals to earn Denmark a play-off against the Republic of Ireland. The first leg of the play-off ended in a 0–0 home draw before Eriksen netted a hat-trick in Dublin's Aviva Stadium in a 5–1 win to earn Denmark a spot at the World Cup. Eriksen's treble took his tally to 11 goals for the qualification campaign, bettered only by Poland's Robert Lewandowski (16) and Portugal's Cristiano Ronaldo (15) in Europe, and earned the praise of national team manager Åge Hareide who stated that Eriksen was one of the top 10 players in the world.

In Denmark's opening match at the tournament, Eriksen assisted Yussuf Poulsen for the only goal in a 1–0 win over Peru before scoring his first goal for the tournament in the 1–1 draw with Australia the following week. Denmark ultimately progressed from their group after which they were drawn with Croatia in the Round of 16. There they were defeated after a penalty shoot-out, with Eriksen being one of three players to have his spot-kick saved by Croatia goalkeeper Danijel Subašić.

On 9 September 2018, Eriksen scored twice in a 2–0 win over Wales to lead Denmark to victory in the nation's inaugural 2018–19 UEFA Nations League B match. On 14 October 2020, Eriksen played his 100th match for Denmark, in which he scored a penalty in a 1–0 away win against England in the 2020–21 UEFA Nations League.

==== UEFA Euro 2020 cardiac arrest ====
Eriksen was included in Denmark's squad for the delayed UEFA Euro 2020 on 25 May 2021. On 12 June, while playing in Denmark's opening group stage match against Finland at Parken Stadium in Copenhagen, Eriksen collapsed in the 42nd minute as he was about to receive a throw-in. Eriksen's teammate and captain Simon Kjær was credited for his response after placing him into the recovery position. Urgent medical assistance arrived immediately, and cardiopulmonary resuscitation and defibrillation were performed on the field before Eriksen was taken off the pitch on a stretcher and the match was suspended. Around an hour after the incident, UEFA and Danish Football Association (DBU) officials confirmed from the Rigshospitalet Hospital that Eriksen had been stabilized and was awake.

The match continued later that evening, resulting in a 1–0 victory for Finland, with Eriksen chosen by UEFA as the man of the match. Denmark manager Kasper Hjulmand and team doctor Morten Boesen both later expressed regret at the match's continuation, although Eriksen's teammate Martin Braithwaite said that the decision to do so was the "least bad one". The decision to continue the match was also criticised by Peter Schmeichel, father of Denmark's keeper Kasper, who said that UEFA had threatened the team with a 3–0 loss if they refused to finish the match later on that day or the following day at noon, leaving the players with "no choice" but to continue. The BBC was also heavily criticised for continuing to stream the incident recording 6,417 complaints.

The next day, Boesen confirmed Eriksen had suffered a cardiac arrest. The incident itself drew comparisons to Fabrice Muamba and Abdelhak Nouri, two professional footballers who also collapsed during play in similar circumstances. Muamba was forced to retire, and Nouri suffered permanent brain damage. On 15 June, Eriksen posted a picture of himself in the hospital on his social media along with a brief statement, stating that he was "fine under the circumstances". The following day, it was announced that he would be fitted with an implantable cardioverter-defibrillator device, a decision described by Boesen as "necessary due to rhythm disturbances" following his cardiac arrest. The operation jeopardised his contract with Inter Milan due to Serie A rules, which did not allow players wearing ICD devices to play. His contract was terminated later that year.

On 18 June, the DBU declared that Eriksen had undergone a successful operation and was discharged from Rigshospitalet. After his discharge, he visited his Danish teammates in Helsingør before returning home to his family. The Danish team later dedicated their 4–1 win over Russia in their final group match to Eriksen; the result allowed them to advance to the round of 16. They later went on to reach the semi-finals of the tournament, where they were eliminated following a 2–1 extra-time loss to England at Wembley Stadium, on 7 July.

==== Return to international football ====
Eriksen returned to international football on 26 March 2022, coming on at half-time in a 4–2 loss against the Netherlands, scoring two minutes into his return. He was included in the squad for the 2022 FIFA World Cup, playing in every minute of Denmark's campaign as they finished bottom of Group D.

Eriksen was included in the squad for UEFA Euro 2024. He scored in Denmark's opening Group C match against Slovenia that ended in a 1–1 draw. In the last group stage encounter against Serbia, he featured in his 133rd international match, becoming the most-capped Danish player ahead of his teammate Simon Kjær.

In August 2025, after Eriksen's departure from Manchester United, Danish national team coach Brian Riemer excluded Eriksen from the national team's squad for the 2026 World Cup qualification matches in September. Riemer stated weeks prior that he would exclude Eriksen if the midfielder was not signed with a club. On 30 September, after having signed with German club VfL Wolfsburg, Eriksen returned to the national team squad list ahead of two World Cup qualification matches in October.

==== Ukraine friendly collapse ====
On 7 June 2026, Eriksen suffered a second on-field collapse in the 65th minute of an international friendly against Ukraine at Nature Energy Park in Odense. He regained consciousness shortly after receiving a shock from his ICD, and the match was subsequently abandoned. He was later confirmed to be in good condition and began an individual rehabilitation program in Denmark under medical supervision.

== Style of play ==
Described as a "classic number ten" in the media, Eriksen's favoured position is in a free role in the centre of the pitch as an attacking midfielder behind the forwards; however, he is a tactically versatile player, who is also capable of playing as a central midfielder or mezzala in a 4–3–3 system (as was the case during his first years with Ajax), and as a right winger in a 4–2–3–1 formation. He has also been used on the left flank on occasion, or as a second striker.

Eriksen is also known for his work-rate and intelligence on the pitch. He is skilled with seeing the goal, and is known for his ability to strike the ball with power and accuracy with either foot, despite being naturally right-footed; moreover, he has also established himself as a free kick specialist.

Due to his playing style, nationality, and role, pundits have compared him to his compatriots Michael and Brian Laudrup, who were two of his major influences in his youth, as well as Wesley Sneijder and Rafael van der Vaart; Eriksen has also cited Francesco Totti as an inspiration.

== Personal life ==
Eriksen lives with his partner Sabrina Kvist Jensen. They have a son and a daughter. His younger sister Louise Eriksen also plays professional football, and has made appearances for the Danish women's under-16 national team.

== Career statistics ==
=== Club ===
As of match played 25 May 2026

Appearances and goals by club, season and competition
Club	Season	League			National cup (Note: Includes KNVB Cup, FA Cup, Coppa Italia, DFB-Pokal)		League cup (Note: Includes Football League/EFL Cup)		Europe		Other		Total	
Club	Season	Division	Apps	Goals	Apps	Goals	Apps	Goals	Apps	Goals	Apps	Goals	Apps	Goals
Ajax	2009–10	Eredivisie	15	0	4	1	—		2 (Note: Appearances in UEFA Europa League)	0	—		21	1
Ajax	2010–11	Eredivisie	28	6	6	1	—		12 (Note: Eight appearances in UEFA Champions League, four appearances and one goal in UEFA Europa League)	1	1 (Note: Appearance in Johan Cruyff Shield)	0	47	8
Ajax	2011–12	Eredivisie	33	7	2	0	—		8 (Note: Six appearances and one goal in UEFA Champions League, two appearances in UEFA Europa League)	1	1	0	44	8
Ajax	2012–13	Eredivisie	33	10	4	2	—		8	1	—		45	13
Ajax	2013–14	Eredivisie	4	2	—		—		—		1	0	5	2
Ajax	Total		113	25	16	4	—		30	3	3	0	162	32
Tottenham Hotspur	2013–14	Premier League	25	7	1	0	1	0	9	3	—		36	10
Tottenham Hotspur	2014–15	Premier League	38	10	2	0	4	2	4	0	—		48	12
Tottenham Hotspur	2015–16	Premier League	35	6	4	1	1	0	7	1	—		47	8
Tottenham Hotspur	2016–17	Premier League	36	8	3	1	1	2	8 (Note: Six appearances in UEFA Champions League, two appearances and one goal in UEFA Europa League)	1	—		48	12
Tottenham Hotspur	2017–18	Premier League	37	10	3	2	1	0	6 (Note: Appearances in UEFA Champions League)	2	—		47	14
Tottenham Hotspur	2018–19	Premier League	35	8	0	0	4	0	12	2	—		51	10
Tottenham Hotspur	2019–20	Premier League	20	2	2	0	1	0	5	1	—		28	3
Tottenham Hotspur	Total		226	51	15	4	13	4	51	10	—		305	69
Inter Milan	2019–20	Serie A	17	1	3	1	—		6	2	—		26	4
Inter Milan	2020–21	Serie A	26	3	4	1	—		4	0	—		34	4
Inter Milan	Total		43	4	7	2	—		10	2	—		60	8
Brentford	2021–22	Premier League	11	1	0	0	—		—		—		11	1
Manchester United	2022–23	Premier League	28	1	4	0	4	1	8	0	—		44	2
Manchester United	2023–24	Premier League	22	1	2	0	0	0	4	0	—		28	1
Manchester United	2024–25	Premier League	23	1	1	0	2	2	9	2	0	0	35	5
Manchester United	Total		73	3	7	0	6	3	21	2	0	0	107	8
VfL Wolfsburg	2025–26	Bundesliga	31	3	1	0	—		—		2 (Note: Appearances in Bundesliga relegation play-offs)	0	34	3
Career total			497	87	46	10	19	7	112	17	5	0	679	121

=== International ===
As of match played 7 June 2026

Appearances and goals by national team and year
National team	Year	Apps	Goals
Denmark	2010	10	0
Denmark	2011	10	2
Denmark	2012	11	0
Denmark	2013	11	2
Denmark	2014	7	1
Denmark	2015	8	1
Denmark	2016	9	6
Denmark	2017	9	9
Denmark	2018	10	4
Denmark	2019	10	6
Denmark	2020	8	5
Denmark	2021	6	0
Denmark	2022	11	3
Denmark	2023	6	1
Denmark	2024	14	3
Denmark	2025	7	3
Denmark	2026	4	0
Total		151	46

Scores and results list Denmark's goal tally first, score column indicates score after each Eriksen goal.

List of international goals scored by Christian Eriksen
No.	Date	Venue	Cap	Opponent	Score	Result	Competition	Ref.
1	4 June 2011	Laugardalsvöllur, Reykjavík, Iceland	14	Iceland	2–0	2–0	UEFA Euro 2012 qualifying	
2	10 August 2011	Hampden Park, Glasgow, Scotland	15	Scotland	1–1	1–2	Friendly	
3	5 June 2013	Aalborg Stadium, Aalborg, Denmark	35	Georgia	2–1	2–1	Friendly	
4	14 August 2013	Gdańsk Stadium, Gdańsk, Poland	37	Poland	1–1	2–3	Friendly	
5	22 May 2014	Nagyerdei Stadion, Debrecen, Hungary	43	Hungary	1–1	2–2	Friendly	
6	8 June 2015	Viborg Stadium, Viborg, Denmark	52	Montenegro	1–1	2–1	Friendly	
7	7 June 2016	Suita City Football Stadium, Suita, Japan	61	Bulgaria	2–0	4–0	2016 Kirin Cup	
8	7 June 2016	Suita City Football Stadium, Suita, Japan	61	Bulgaria	3–0	4–0	2016 Kirin Cup	
9	7 June 2016	Suita City Football Stadium, Suita, Japan	61	Bulgaria	4–0	4–0	2016 Kirin Cup	
10	4 September 2016	Parken Stadium, Copenhagen, Denmark	63	Armenia	1–0	1–0	2018 FIFA World Cup qualification	
11	11 November 2016	Parken Stadium, Copenhagen, Denmark	66	Kazakhstan	2–1	4–1	2018 FIFA World Cup qualification	
12	11 November 2016	Parken Stadium, Copenhagen, Denmark	66	Kazakhstan	4–1	4–1	2018 FIFA World Cup qualification	
13	6 June 2017	Brøndby Stadium, Brøndbyvester, Denmark	68	Germany	1–0	1–1	Friendly	
14	10 June 2017	Almaty Central Stadium, Almaty, Kazakhstan	69	Kazakhstan	2–0	3–1	2018 FIFA World Cup qualification	
15	1 September 2017	Parken Stadium, Copenhagen, Denmark	70	Poland	4–0	4–0	2018 FIFA World Cup qualification	
16	4 September 2017	Vazgen Sargsyan Republican Stadium, Yerevan, Armenia	71	Armenia	2–1	4–1	2018 FIFA World Cup qualification	
17	5 October 2017	Podgorica City Stadium, Podgorica, Montenegro	72	Montenegro	1–0	1–0	2018 FIFA World Cup qualification	
18	8 October 2017	Parken Stadium, Copenhagen, Denmark	73	Romania	1–0	1–1	2018 FIFA World Cup qualification	
19	14 November 2017	Aviva Stadium, Dublin, Republic of Ireland	75	Republic of Ireland	2–1	5–1	2018 FIFA World Cup qualification	
20	14 November 2017	Aviva Stadium, Dublin, Republic of Ireland	75	Republic of Ireland	3–1	5–1	2018 FIFA World Cup qualification	
21	14 November 2017	Aviva Stadium, Dublin, Republic of Ireland	75	Republic of Ireland	4–1	5–1	2018 FIFA World Cup qualification	
22	9 June 2018	Brøndby Stadium, Brøndbyvester, Denmark	78	Mexico	2–0	2–0	Friendly	
23	21 June 2018	Samara Arena, Samara, Russia	80	Australia	1–0	1–1	2018 FIFA World Cup	
24	9 September 2018	Aarhus Stadium, Aarhus, Denmark	83	Wales	1–0	2–0	2018–19 UEFA Nations League B	
25	9 September 2018	Aarhus Stadium, Aarhus, Denmark	83	Wales	2–0	2–0	2018–19 UEFA Nations League B	
26	31 March 2019	Fadil Vokrri Stadium, Pristina, Kosovo	86	Kosovo	1–1	2–2	Friendly	
27	10 June 2019	Parken Stadium, Copenhagen, Denmark	89	Georgia	2–1	5–1	UEFA Euro 2020 qualifying	
28	5 September 2019	Victoria Stadium, Gibraltar	90	Gibraltar	2–0	6–0	UEFA Euro 2020 qualifying	
29	5 September 2019	Victoria Stadium, Gibraltar	90	Gibraltar	3–0	6–0	UEFA Euro 2020 qualifying	
30	15 November 2019	Parken Stadium, Copenhagen, Denmark	94	Gibraltar	5–0	6–0	UEFA Euro 2020 qualifying	
31	15 November 2019	Parken Stadium, Copenhagen, Denmark	94	Gibraltar	6–0	6–0	UEFA Euro 2020 qualifying	
32	7 October 2020	MCH Arena, Herning, Denmark	98	Faroe Islands	2–0	4–0	Friendly	
33	11 October 2020	Laugardalsvöllur, Reykjavík, Iceland	99	Iceland	2–0	3–0	2020–21 UEFA Nations League A	
34	14 October 2020	Wembley Stadium, London, England	100	England	1–0	1–0	2020–21 UEFA Nations League A	
35	15 November 2020	Parken Stadium, Copenhagen, Denmark	102	Iceland	1–0	2–1	2020–21 UEFA Nations League A	
36	15 November 2020	Parken Stadium, Copenhagen, Denmark	102	Iceland	2–1	2–1	2020–21 UEFA Nations League A	
37	26 March 2022	Johan Cruyff Arena, Amsterdam, Netherlands	110	Netherlands	2–3	2–4	Friendly	
38	29 March 2022	Parken Stadium, Copenhagen, Denmark	111	Serbia	3–0	3–0	Friendly	
39	22 September 2022	Stadion Maksimir, Zagreb, Croatia	116	Croatia	1–1	1–2	2022–23 UEFA Nations League A	
40	7 September 2023	Parken Stadium, Copenhagen, Denmark	123	San Marino	4–0	4–0	UEFA Euro 2024 qualifying	
41	5 June 2024	Parken Stadium, Copenhagen, Denmark	129	Sweden	2–1	2–1	Friendly	
42	16 June 2024	MHPArena, Stuttgart, Germany	131	Slovenia	1–0	1–1	UEFA Euro 2024	
43	15 October 2024	Kybunpark, St. Gallen, Switzerland	138	Switzerland	2–2	2–2	2024–25 UEFA Nations League A	
44	23 March 2025	Estádio José Alvalade, Lisbon, Portugal	142	Portugal	2–2	2–5	2024–25 UEFA Nations League A	
45	7 June 2025	Parken Stadium, Copenhagen, Denmark	143	Northern Ireland	2–1	2–1	Friendly	
46	10 June 2025	Odense Stadium, Odense, Denmark	144	Lithuania	2–0	5–0	Friendly	

== Honours ==
Ajax

- Eredivisie: 2010–11, 2011–12, 2012–13
- KNVB Cup: 2009–10
- Johan Cruyff Shield: 2013

Tottenham Hotspur

- Football League Cup runner-up: 2014–15
- UEFA Champions League runner-up: 2018–19

Inter Milan

- Serie A: 2020–21
- UEFA Europa League runner-up: 2019–20

Manchester United

- FA Cup: 2023–24; runner-up: 2022–23
- EFL Cup: 2022–23
- UEFA Europa League runner-up: 2024–25

Individual

- Ajax Talent of the Future (Sjaak Swart Award) 2010
- Ajax Talent of the Year (Marco van Basten Award): 2011
- Danish U-17 Talent of the Year: 2008
- Danish Talent of the Year: 2010, 2011
- Johan Cruyff Trophy: 2011
- Dutch Footballer of the Year Bronze Boot: 2012
- Danish Football Player of the Year: 2013, 2014, 2015, 2017, 2018
- Danish Football Player of the Year by TV2 and DBU: 2011, 2013, 2014, 2017
- PFA Team of the Year: 2017–18 Premier League
- Tottenham Hotspur Player of the Year: 2013–14, 2016–17
- UEFA Champions League Midfielder of the Season 2nd place: 2018–19
- Premier League Goal of the Month: April 2018
- FIFA FIFPro World11 nominee: 2019 (14th midfielder)
- Laureus World Sports Award for Comeback of the Year: 2023

== See also ==
- List of men's footballers with 100 or more international caps
- List of Danish sportspeople
- Damar Hamlin - An NFL player who suffered a similar cardiac arrest during a competition
