= Kasper Køhlert =

Danish footballer (born 1989)

Kasper Beier Køhlert
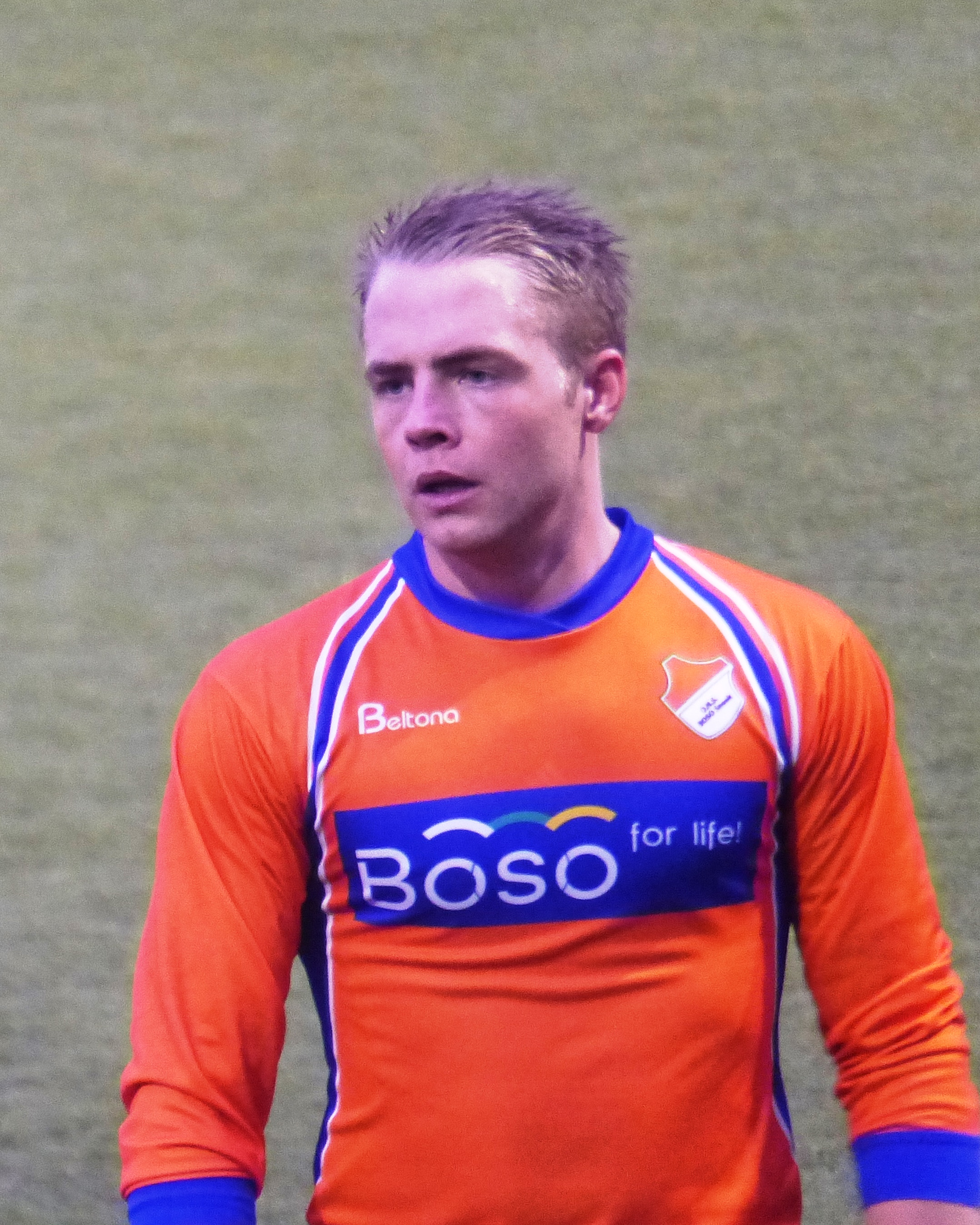
- Kasper Køhlert for ONS Sneek

Personal information
- Date of birth: 1989 (age 36–37)
- Place of birth: Denmark
- Height: 1.79 m (5 ft 10 1/2 in)
- Position: Midfielder

Team information
- Current team: Varde IF
- Number: 19

Youth career
- Tjæreborg
- Esbjerg fB
- Sædding Guldager IF

Senior career*
| Years | Team | Apps | (Gls) |
- Sædding Guldager IF
- ONS Boso Sneek
| 2008– | Varde IF | | |
- * Club domestic league appearances and goals as of 22 February 2015

Kasper Beier Køhlert (born 1989) is a Danish footballer who currently plays for Varde IF.

Køhlert began his career with local side Esbjerg, he spent his youth years there before joining Varde IF. In the summer of 2013 Køhlert went to ONS Sneek, where he still plays.

Køhlert's father is Morten Køhlert who currently works as an assistant manager at Varde If and his brother Nicolaj Køhlert who is younger, have played for Liverpool, Glasgow Rangers and is now playing for the Danish side Silkeborg IF.
