= Nicoline =

Nicoline is a feminine given name. Notable people with the name include:

- Nini Roll Anker (born Nicoline Magdalene Roll; 1873–1942), Norwegian novelist and playwright
- Nicoline Artursson (born 1993), Swedish fashion model, beauty pageant titleholder (Miss World Sweden 2011)
- Nicoline Christine Hambro (1861–1926), Norwegian women’s rights advocate and politician
- Nicoline Jensen (born 1992), Danish ice hockey forward
- Nicoline Sørensen (born 1997), Danish footballer
- Nicoline Thaulow (1807–1885), Norwegian writer
- Nicoline Tuxen (1847–1931), Danish painter
- Nicoline van der Sijs (born 1955), Dutch linguist and etymologist
- Nicoline Weywadt (1848–1921), Icelandic photographer, regarded as the first woman photographer in Iceland
- Nicoline Zedeler (1889–1961), Swedish-born American violinist

== See also ==
- Nikoline
