= Stefan Nilsson =

Stefan Nilsson may refer to:

- Stefan Nilsson (sport shooter), Swedish sport shooter
- Stefan Nilsson (footballer), Swedish footballer
- Stefan Nilsson (composer), Swedish composer and pianist

== See also ==
- Stefan Nielsen (disambiguation)
