= Thomas Rohde =

Danish footballer

Personal information
- Date of birth: 19 November 1999 (age 26)
- Height: 1.74 m (5 ft 9 in)
- Position: Forward

Team information
- Current team: VSK Aarhus
- Number: 21

Youth career
- Hatting/Torsted
- AC Horsens
- Hatting/Torsted
- Vejle BK
- Hatting/Torsted
- AC Horsens

Senior career*
Years	Team	Apps	(Gls)
2017–2019	AC Horsens	1	(0)
2019–	VSK Aarhus	1	(0)
- * Club domestic league appearances and goals as of 10:03, 21 February 2019 (UTC)

Thomas Rohde (born 19 November 1999) is a Danish professional footballer who plays for VSK Aarhus as a forward.

== Youth career ==
Rohde started playing for Hatting/Torsted, before joining the talent school of AC Horsens at the age of 12 as a goalkeeper, but was later excluded from the squad for the U13 team. He then moved back to his former club, Hatting/Torsted. As a U15 player, he was spotted by scouts from Vejle Boldklub and moved to the club, where he played one season as a U17 player. During his time at Vejle, he lost the desire to play as a goalkeeper. Rohde then played as a centre back, and after playing for Vejle for half a year, he moved back to Hatting/Torsted, where he started playing as a forward. Rohde decided to give it another chance in AC Horsens. The club held open training sessions and Rohde went to them, before joining the team permanently.

Ahead of the 2019/20 season, Rohde joined Danish 2nd Division club VSK Aarhus.
