= Martin Arlofelt =

Danish footballer (born 1985)

Personal information
- Date of birth: 25 January 1985 (age 41)
- Place of birth: Hvidovre, Denmark
- Height: 1.88 m (6 ft 2 in)
- Position: Defender

Senior career*
Years	Team	Apps	(Gls)
2001–2006	Brøndby	0	(0)
2006–2008	Køge	34	(1)
2008–2009	Herfølge	24	(0)
2009–2010	HB Køge	20	(0)
Total		78	(1)

International career
2003	Denmark U19	1	(0)
- * Club domestic league appearances and goals

Martin Arlofelt (born 25 January 1985) is a Danish former professional footballer who played as a defender, who played in the Danish Superliga championship for HB Køge. He played one game for the Denmark national under-19 football team.

== Career ==
Arlofelt started his youth career in Danish Superliga club Brøndby IF, but did not play any senior games for the club, before moving on in July 2006. He joined Danish 1st Division team Køge Boldklub, where he made his senior debut and recorded strong performances. In 2008, he moved on to 1st Division rivals Herfølge Boldklub. When Herfølge and Køge merged to form HB Køge in 2009, Arlofelt was on the roster. He helped the club win promotion to the Superliga, and played 16 games for the club in the 2009–10 Danish Superliga season which ended in relegation. As his contract expired in the Winter 2010, Arlofelt ended his playing career to focus on his education as an electrician.
