= Mikael Lai Rasmussen =

Danish rugby union player

- Born: 1 May 1973 (age 53) Denmark
- Height: 1.87 m (6 ft 2 in)
- Weight: 100 kg (16 st)

Rugby union career
- Position: Flanker
Amateur team(s)
Years	Team	Apps	(Points)
- Aarhus RK
International career
Years	Team	Apps	(Points)
	DEN	53	

Mikael Lai Rasmussen (born 1 May 1973 in Denmark) is a Danish rugby player who plays for Aarhus RK. Lai Rasmussen has 53 caps for the Danish national rugby union team.
