= Michael Zacho =

Danish footballer (born 1996)

Personal information
- Full name: Michael Zacho Jørgensen
- Date of birth: 11 November 1996 (age 30)
- Place of birth: Aarhus, Denmark
- Height: 1.86 m (6 ft 1 in)
- Positions: Winger; forward

Youth career
- AGF

Senior career*
Years	Team	Apps	(Gls)
2015–2018	AGF	16	(0)
2018	→ Brabrand (loan)	11	(0)

International career
2011–2012	Denmark U-16	3	(0)
2014–2015	Denmark U-19	4	(0)
2016	Denmark U-20	2	(0)
- * Club domestic league appearances and goals

Michael Zacho Jørgensen (born 11 November 1996) is a Danish retired footballer.

== Club career ==
=== AGF ===
Zacho joined AGF at the age of 12. Already at the age of 14, Zacho had trained with Liverpool and one year after, he signed a contract with AGF as well.

On 30 May 2015, Zacho got his professional debut for AGF, in a match against Lyngby BK. Zacho started on the bench, but replaces Davit Skhirtladze in the 76nd minute.

On 18 May 2018, AGF announced that Zacho alongside two other teammates, would leave the club in the summer, where their contract was expiring.

==== On loan from Brabrand IF ====
On 25 January 2018, Zacho was loaned out to Brabrand IF for the rest of the season.
