= Jens Rinke =

Danish footballer (born 1990)

Personal information
- Full name: Jens Rinke Kristensen
- Date of birth: 16 April 1990 (age 36)
- Place of birth: Haderslev, Denmark
- Height: 1.84 m (6 ft 0 in)
- Position: Goalkeeper

Team information
- Current team: Sønderjyske (goalkeeping coach)

Youth career
- –2009: Midtjylland
- 2009: Sønderjyske

Senior career*
Years	Team	Apps	(Gls)
2010–2011	Kolding FC	35	(0)
2011–2013	Fredericia	31	(0)
2013–2014	Vestsjælland	0	(0)
2014–2016	Sønderjyske	1	(0)
2016–2017	Silkeborg	3	(0)
2017–2020	Kolding	115	(0)
Total		185	(0)

International career
2009	Denmark U20	1	(0)
- * Club domestic league appearances and goals

Jens Rinke Kristensen (born 16 April 1990) is a Danish former footballer who played as a goalkeeper.

== Club career ==
Born in Haderslev, Rinke was part of the Midtjylland youth academy, and participated in a trial practice with English Premier League club Everton at age 15. In July 2009, he trialled with AC Horsens but did not manage to secure a contract.

On 1 February 2010, Rinke signed his first senior contract with Kolding FC in the second-tier Danish 1st Division. A year later, on 22 March 2011, he was signed by Fredericia on a contract lasting until the end of the season, after becoming a free agent in Kolding. He established himself as a starter at the club and extended his contract shortly after.

Rinke would later also play for Vestsjælland, SønderjyskE, Silkeborg and Kolding IF. On 1 February 2020, Rinke was released by Kolding IF.

== Coaching career ==
In January 2021, Rinke was hired as an academy goalkeeper coach for his former club SønderjyskE. In March 2022, after Toivo Vadum's departure, Rinke was promoted to the club's Danish Superliga team, where he was to serve as goalkeeping coach.

In the summer of 2024, Rinke extended his contract until June 2027.

== International career ==
He gained one cap for the Denmark under-20 team.
