= Marianne Løvendorf =

Danish footballer (born 1982)

Personal information
- Date of birth: 23 May 1982 (age 44)
- Position: Defender

Senior career*
Years	Team	Apps	(Gls)
- OB Odense
2004–2008	Brøndby IF	74	(0)

International career^{‡}
2000	Denmark	4	(0)
- * Club domestic league appearances and goals ‡ National team caps and goals as of 18 December 2007

Marianne Løvendorf (born 23 May 1982) is a Danish former football defender who played for OB Odense, Brøndby IF and the Denmark national team. She made a total of 99 appearances for Brøndby between 2004 and 2008, without scoring any goals.
