= Casper Hyltoft =

Danish footballer (born 1993)

Personal information
- Date of birth: July 12, 1993 (age 33)
- Position: Midfielder

Team information
- Current team: Vanløse IF

Youth career
- 2011: Brøndby IF U19
- Esbjerg fB

Senior career*
Years	Team	Apps	(Gls)
2012–2013	Frederikssund IK		
2014	BK Søllerød-Vedbæk		
2014–	Vanløse IF		
- * Club domestic league appearances and goals

Casper Hyltoft (born 12 July 1993) is a Danish former professional football player, who is now playing football tennis in KFIF. Casper has been representing Fodtennis Danmark, which is the Danish National Team in football tennis, since 2020. Casper won the Danish National Championship in the categories of double and triple in 2022.

[4][5]

== Youth career ==
Hyltoft had started his youth career playing for Brøndby and played for the Esbjerg fB.

=== Nike Chance ===
Hyltoft was one of seven talented young players from Denmark selected to compete in the Nike Chance trials event in Zeist, Netherlands. Hyltoft was not selected after losing out to fellow countryman, Claus Hennie.

== Club career ==
=== Frederikssund IK ===
Hyltoft scored one goal in three games in the 2012–13 Danish Cup after going 1–2 in a first round elimination.

== International career ==
=== Haiti national U-23 ===
Hyltoft is currently exploring the prospect of joining the Haiti national under-23 football team in hopes of qualifying for 2016 Rio Olympics, as he would be edible to play by way of his mother, who is native of Haiti.

=== The World Cup in Romania ===
Casper represented Fodtennis Danmark at the World Cup in Romania 2021.

=== The European Championship in Turkey ===
Casper represented Fodtennis Danmark at the European Championship 2022.
