= Carl Nelson (wrestler) =

Danish wrestler

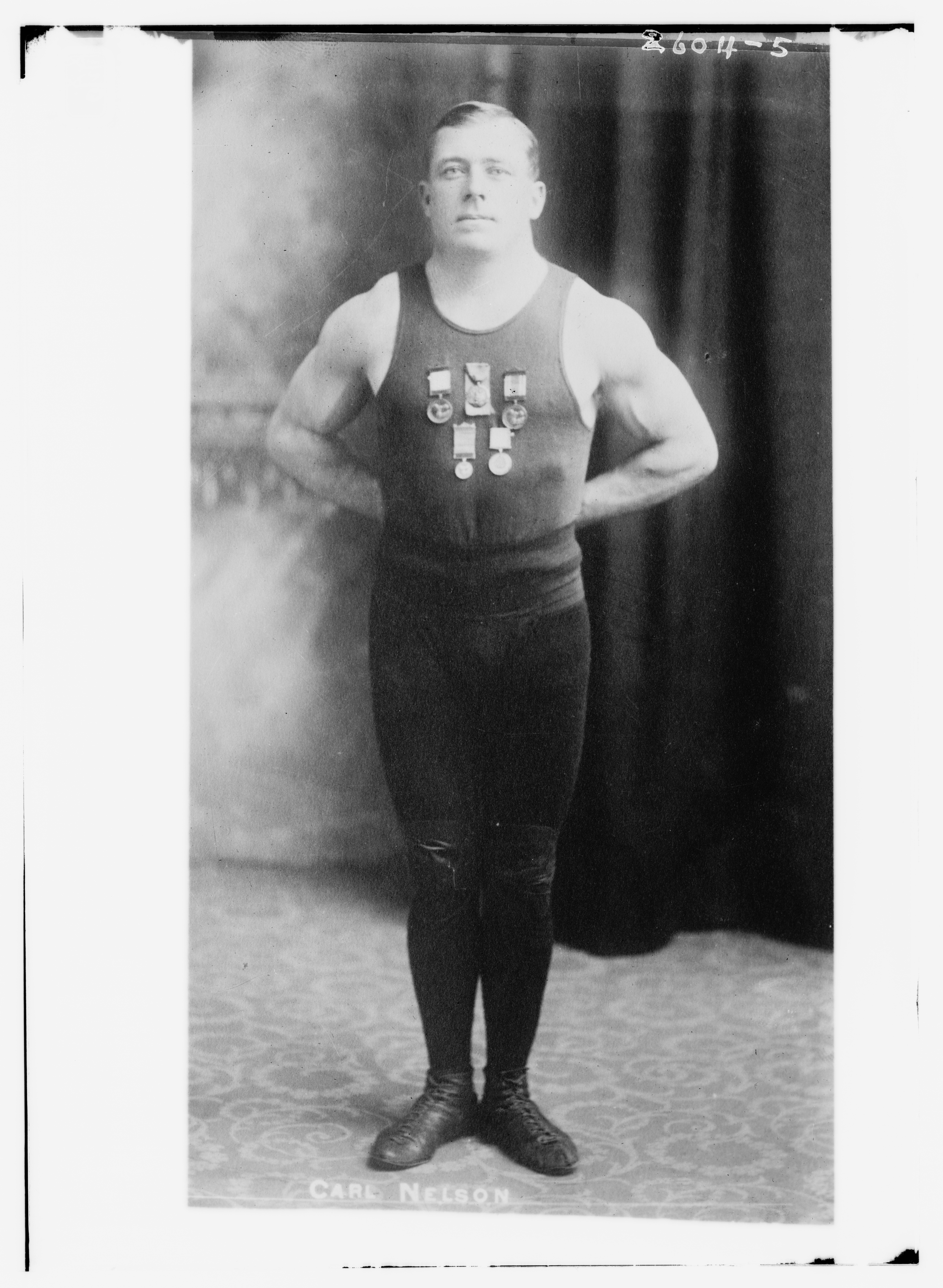

Carl Nelson was a Danish Greco-Roman wrestler. He was the European welterweight champion.
