= Pelle Larsen =

Danish handball player (born 1979)

Personal information
- Full name: Pelle Larsen
- Nationality: Danish (Denmark)
- Born: September 1, 1979 (age 47) Copenhagen, Denmark
- Height: 193 cm (76 in)

Sport
- Sport: Handball
- Position: Line player
- Current club: Skjern Håndbold
- Number: 4
National team
Years	Team	Apps	(Gls)
2003-2004	Denmark	7	(13)
- Updated on January 2024

Pelle Larsen (born September 1, 1979) is a Danish former handballer. His last club was Danish Handball League side Skjern Håndbold. He has previously played for league rivals Ajax København and AaB Håndbold, and has also played abroad, for Spanish club BM Altea.

Larsen has made 7 appearances for the Danish national handball team.
