= Ronni Hansen =

Danish footballer

Personal information
- Date of birth: 30 June 1988 (age 38)
- Place of birth: Denmark
- Position: Midfielder

Youth career
- AIK 65 Strøby
- Herfølge BK
- 2003–2008: Lyngby BK

Senior career*
Years	Team	Apps	(Gls)
2008–2010	Lyngby BK		
2010	Næstved BK		
2010–2011	Vanløse IF		
????–????	AIK 65 Strøby		
- * Club domestic league appearances and goals as of 22 June 2012

Ronni Hansen (born 30 June 1988) is a Danish professional football midfielder.
