= Søren Mussmann =

Danish footballer (born 1993)

Personal information
- Date of birth: 29 June 1993 (age 33)
- Place of birth: Haderslev, Denmark
- Position: Center back

Youth career
- Agerskov
- Haderslev FK
- SønderjyskE

Senior career*
Years	Team	Apps	(Gls)
2011–2016	SønderjyskE	45	(1)
2016–2017	Pro Vercelli	4	(0)
- * Club domestic league appearances and goals

Søren Mussmann (born 29 June 1993) is a Danish retired professional football defender.

== Retirement and later career ==
Mussmann retired on 17 January 2017 at the age of 23, due to several hip operations.

However, in April 2019, Mussmann signed with Denmark Series 4 amateur club TIF All Stars.
