= Simon Krogh =

Danish handball player (born 1980)

Personal information
- Full name: Simon Krogh
- Nationality: Danish (Denmark)
- Born: 27 March 1980 (age 46) Fredericia, Denmark
- Height: 187 cm (74 in)

Sport
- Sport: Handball
- Position: Playmaker
- Number: 6

Senior clubs
- Years: Team
- -2007: Fredericia HK
- 2007-2011: Skjern Håndbold
- 2011-2013: Ribe-Esbjerg HH (player-assistant)

Simon Krogh (born 27 March 1980) is a Danish former handballer. He retired in 2013 after two seasons as the player-assistant coach at Ribe-Esbjerg HH. Before that he played 3.5 years at Skjern Håndbold. He has previously played for league rivals Fredericia HK.
