= Sascha Juul =

Danish handball player (born 1990)

Personal information
- Nationality: Danish
- Born: 27 February 1990 (age 36) Copenhagen, Denmark
- Height: 1.62 m (5 ft 4 in)

Sport
- Sport: Handball
- Position: Left wing
- Current club: Ringkøbing Håndbold
- Number: 6

Youth career
- Years: Team
- –: Ajax København

Senior clubs
- Years: Team
- 2008-2009: FC Midtjylland Håndbold
- 2009-2010: TIHF Tåstrup-Ishøj
- 2010-2012: Ajax København
- 2012-2015: Nykøbing Falster Håndboldklub
- 2015-2017: Ajax København
- 2017-2020: Grane Arendal
- 2020-2023: Ringkøbing Håndbold

Sascha Juul Pedersen (born 27 February 1990) is a Danish former handball player who has played for Ringkøbing Håndbold from 2020 to 2023. Before that she played for Norwegian club Grane Arendal and Nykøbing Falster Håndboldklub in Denmark.
