= Martin Fisch =

Danish footballer (born 1993)

Personal information
- Date of birth: 26 January 1993 (age 33)
- Place of birth: Denmark
- Position: Defender

Senior career*
Years	Team	Apps	(Gls)
2012–2013	AB	15	(0)
2013–2014	Hvidovre	2	(0)
2015–2017	HIK		
2017–2019	Helsingør	35	(0)
- * Club domestic league appearances and goals as of 18:33, 17 July 2017 (UTC)

Martin Fisch (born 26 January 1993) is a Danish footballer who most recently played for Helsingør.
