= Nick Christensen =

Danish footballer (born 1985)

Personal information
- Date of birth: 28 August 1985 (age 41)
- Place of birth: Denmark
- Position: Forward

Youth career
- –2000: AB
- 2000–2004: Lyngby BK

Senior career*
Years	Team	Apps	(Gls)
2004–2005	Ølstykke FC	13	(1)
2006–2007	Næstved BK		
2007–2009	AC Horsens	19	(1)
2009–2011	AB	51	(17)
2011–2013	HIK	2	(0)
2013–2014	AB	13	(0)
2014–2016	HIK		
- * Club domestic league appearances and goals as of 15 February 2015

Nick Christensen (born 28 August 1985) is a Danish professional football forward.
