= Mikkel Hedegaard =

Danish footballer (born 1996)

Personal information
- Full name: Mikkel Hedegaard Christensen
- Date of birth: 3 July 1996 (age 30)
- Place of birth: Denmark
- Height: 1.86 m (6 ft 1 in)
- Position: Left back

Youth career
- SønderjyskE

Senior career*
Years	Team	Apps	(Gls)
2014–2018	SønderjyskE	25	(3)
2018	→ FC Fredericia (loan)	8	(2)
- * Club domestic league appearances and goals

Mikkel Hedegaard Christensen (born 3 July 1996) is a Danish retired professional footballer who played as a left back.

At the age of 21, Hedegaard announced his retirement due to several head injuries.
