= Rang Shawkat =

Danish footballer (born 1986)

Personal information
- Full name: Rang Shawkat Barawy
- Date of birth: 7 April 1986 (age 40)
- Place of birth: Copenhagen, Denmark
- Height: 1.82 m (6 ft 0 in)
- Position: Defender

Youth career
- Taastrup B.70
- 2000–200?: Lyngby

Senior career*
Years	Team	Apps	(Gls)
200?–2008	Lyngby	4	(0)
2008–2010	B.93		
2010–2011	Taastrup FC		
2011–2012	Fremad Amager		
2012–2013	B.93		

International career^{‡}
2003–2004	Denmark U-18	4	(0)
2004–2005	Denmark U-19	9	(1)
2006	Denmark U-20	1	(0)
- * Club domestic league appearances and goals as of 28 July 2020 ‡ National team caps and goals as of 1 July 2010

Rang Shawkat Barawy (born 7 April 1986) is a Danish former footballer. During the 2007–08 season, Shawkat made three appearances for Lyngby Boldklub in the Danish Superliga. His debut at the highest level came on 20 August 2007 in a home match against Esbjerg fB, which Lyngby lost 1–6. Afterwards, he failed to establish himself on the team as he suffered a series of debilitating knee injuries, which kept him sidelined for prolonged periods of time.

He is a former Danish youth international.
