= Klaus Moesgaard =

Danish footballer (born 1997)

Personal information
- Full name: Klaus Moesgaard Andersen
- Date of birth: 13 February 1997 (age 29)
- Place of birth: Faster, Denmark
- Height: 1.80 m (5 ft 11 in)
- Position: Midfielder

Team information
- Current team: Ringkøbing
- Number: 8

Youth career
- Faster Boldklub
- 2010–2013: Skjern GF
- 2014–2017: Esbjerg fB

Senior career*
Years	Team	Apps	(Gls)
2013–2014	Skjern GF	13	(16)
2017–2019	Esbjerg fB	0	(0)
2019–	Ringkøbing IF	83	(9)
- * Club domestic league appearances and goals as of 9 September 2023

Klaus Moesgaard Andersen (born 13 February 1997) is a Danish footballer who plays as a midfielder for Denmark Series club Ringkøbing IF.

== Career ==
=== Esbjerg fB ===
Moesgaard started playing football at the age of 13 years-old at Skjern GF, before joining Esbjerg fB in 2014, at the age of 17 yesrs-old. Moesgaard had played for the first senior team of Skjern GF at that age and had helped the club to gain promotion, scoring 16 goals in 13 games in the 2013–14 season. The transfer to Esbjerg was set up by a person who worked for Skjern, who had a contact in Esbjerg fB and through this contact arranged a trial, which went well. He started playing with the U19's and in the summer of 2016, he signed a youth contract. Moesgaard played several friendly games with the first team in the summer of 2016, and also began to train with the first team three times a week.

In April 2017, Moesgaard signed a contract extension despite being injured for the remainder of 2017. He was also promoted to the first team squad. He returned from injury in November 2018 and made his debut in the Danish Cup against fellow Superliga outfit SønderjyskE on 7 November 2018, appearing as a substitute in a 2–1 quarter-final win.

Moesgaard left the club at the end of the 2018–19 season.

=== Ringkøbing IF ===
On 30 July 2019, Danish 2nd Division club Ringkøbing IF announced that they had signed Moesgaard. He continued with the club at the start of the 2020 season despite having trials with clubs abroad he reached no agreement with them and so returned to the club.
