= Hatting/Torsted IF =

Danish football club

Hatting/Torsted
- Full name: Hatting/Torsted Idrætsforening
- Founded: 1992; 34 years ago
- Ground: Hatting Stadion
- Chairman: Flemming Madsen
- Manager: Mads Elkær
- League: Series 2 (VIII)
- Website: http://www.hatting-torsted.dk/

Hatting/Torsted IF is a Danish football club based in Horsens. It was founded in 1992 as a merger between Hatting IF (1889) and Torsted IF (1964). It plays in the DBU Jutland Series 2 one of the eighth tiers of the Danish football league system.

The team reached the main rounds of the Danish Cup in the 2017–18 and 2019–20 seasons. Both seasons resulted in first-round knockouts, to RKG Klarup and FC Fredericia, respectively. In 2019–20, where Hatting/Torsted competed in the fifth-tier Jutland Series, the team had qualified to the main rounds of the cup tournament after a surprising win over fourth-tier Denmark Series team Silkeborg KFUM, who had former Danish Superliga top scorer Thomas Dalgaard in their starting lineup.

On 22 June 2019, Hatting/Torsted suffered relegation to the sixth-tier Series 1, despite beating Aabyhøj IF on the final matchday of the season. The following year, the club would suffer successive relegations, finding themselves in the seventh tier of Danish football in 2020.

== Notable players ==
Hatting/Torsted has mainly focused on youth development, and is a feeder club to nearby professional club AC Horsens. The club has thus developed players such as Jeppe Kjær and Troels Kløve, who both broke through to professional football on the Horsens team.
