= Dalibor Gotovac =

Danish footballer (born 1979)

Personal information
- Full name: Dalibor Gotovac
- Date of birth: 1 October 1979 (age 47)
- Place of birth: Sarajevo, Bosnia and Herzegovina (then SFR Yugoslavia)
- Height: 1.82 m (6 ft 0 in)
- Position: Defender

Youth career
- Fanø
- 1994–: Esbjerg fB

Senior career*
Years	Team	Apps	(Gls)
–2001	Esbjerg fB		
2002	Lyngby	14	(0)
2002–2004	Frem	20	(0)
2004	BK Avarta		
2005–2006	Lyngby	49	
2007–2008	Frem	8	(0)
2009–2011	BK Avarta		
2011–2013	Frem		
2013–2014	Fremad Amager		
- * Club domestic league appearances and goals

Dalibor Gotovac (born 1 October 1979) is a Danish footballer.

Gotovac came to Denmark in 1992.
