= Nicolaj Køhlert =

Danish footballer (born 1993)

Personal information
- Full name: Nicolaj Beier Køhlert
- Date of birth: 21 January 1993 (age 33)
- Place of birth: Tjæreborg, Denmark
- Height: 1.80 m (5 ft 11 in)
- Position: Midfielder

Youth career
- 2008–2009: Esbjerg
- 2009–2011: Liverpool
- 2011–2012: Rangers

Senior career*
Years	Team	Apps	(Gls)
2012–2017	Silkeborg	36	(0)
2016–2017	→ NSÍ Runavík (loan)	22	(1)
2017	Valur Reykjavík	3	(0)
2017	Brabrand IF	9	(0)

International career
2008–2009	Denmark U16	3	(0)
2009–2010	Denmark U17	12	(2)
2010–2011	Denmark U18	10	(1)
2011	Denmark U19	6	(1)
2012	Denmark U20	2	(0)
- * Club domestic league appearances and goals as of 26 June 2017

Nicolaj Beier Køhlert (born 21 January 1993) is a Danish footballer who last played for Brabrand IF. He has played for the youth team of Premier League club Liverpool.

== Career ==
Køhlert began his career with local side Esbjerg at the age of 15 in 2008; he spent a year there before joining Liverpool in England; during his time in Liverpool, Køhlert played for the reserves and under-18 sides but failed to make a first team appearance. In summer 2011, Køhlert left Liverpool to join Scottish side Rangers on a two-year deal, he played in the reserves during his six-month stay at the club but after Rangers entered administration.

Køhlert returned to Denmark to join Silkeborg on a free transfer. He didn't make his debut for Silkeborg until 17 March 2013, when he came on as an 83rd-minute substitute for Jesper Bech in a 1–0 defeat against Randers. His second appearance came in April again as a substitute this time replacing Jeppe Illum in the 72nd minute. Køhlert played another seven league matches, all substitute appearances.

In spring 2014 Køhlert was a regular at the midfield in Silkeborg IF, and he played an important part in their promotion to the Superleague.

In November 2015 Køhlert signed a new 3 1/2-year contract with Silkeborg IF.

== International career ==
Køhlert has represented Denmark at various youth levels.
