= Nikoline Nielsen (businesswoman) =

Kirsten Nicoline Sofie Nielsen, more widely known as Nikoline Nielsen (1874–1951) was a Danish businesswomen who, after her husband's death in 1914, headed the brewery later known as Faxe Bryggeri. In 1945, she retired transferring responsibility to her three sons. She is remembered for her portrait on Denmark's first soda without colourants, labelled "Nikoline Appelsinvand" (orange soda).

== Biography ==
Born on 6 December 1874 in Faxe, Kirsten Nicoline Sofie Nielsen was the daughter of the beer merchant Rasmus Nielsen (1840–1914) and his wife Maren Kirstine née Christophersen (1839–1905). In November 1897, she married the brewer Charles Conrad Nielsen (1866–1914) with whom she had five children Kaj (1898), Carl Wilhelm (1900), Erik (1902), Helmer (1905) and Inger Margrethe (1910).

While still a child, she helped her father with his beer business as he experienced difficulties resulting from his drinking problems. After her marriage, her husband also helped and in 1901, the family established Fakse Dampølsbryggeri. Nikoline Nielsen was involved in the company from the beginning and took it over when her husband died in 1914. The company grew slowly but surely under her management, expanding into a regional company in 1928 known as Faxe Bryggeri, Malt- og Mineralvandsfabrik. It supplied beer and soft drinks throughout southern Zealand. Further success was achieved in 1938 when deep drilling revealed a source of fine clear water in the subsoil, unmatched in the rest of Denmark. As a result, the brewery gained a competitive advantage and was able to produce stronger beers. In 1945, Nielsen retired from active management, leaving her sons to take over her responsibilities.

Nikoline Nielsen died in Faxe on 9 January 1951. In 1978, the company produced its first orange soda without colorants. Known as Nikoline Nielsens Appelsinvand, the label featured her portrait.
