= Stefan Nielsen (handballer) =

Danish handball player (born 1986)

Personal information
- Full name: Stefan Nielsen
- Nationality: Danish (Denmark)
- Born: 5 April 1986 (age 40)
- Height: 183 cm (72 in)

Sport
- Sport: Handball
- Position: Left Winger
- Current club: Retired
- Number: 11

Stefan Nielsen (born 5 April 1986) is a Danish retired handballer: During his career he played for Danish Handball League sides Viborg HK, Mors-Thy Håndbold, Ikast FS and Skive fH.

During his youth career, Nielsen made several appearances for the Danish national youth handball teams.
