= Casper Olesen =

Danish footballer (born 1996)

Personal information
- Full name: Casper Heesch Olesen
- Date of birth: 10 May 1996 (age 30)
- Place of birth: Aarhus, Denmark
- Height: 1.78 m (5 ft 10 in)
- Position: Midfielder

Youth career
- Dybbøl IU
- FC Sønderborg
- –2013: Haderslev FK
- 2013–2015: SønderjyskE

Senior career*
Years	Team	Apps	(Gls)
2013–2018	SønderjyskE	11	(0)
2018	HIFK	4	(0)
2018–2019	Thisted FC	18	(2)
2019–2021	Weiche Flensburg	27	(7)

International career
2012–2013	Denmark U-17	9	(2)
2013–2014	Denmark U-18	4	(2)
2014–2015	Denmark U-19	7	(0)
2015	Denmark U-20	1	(1)
- * Club domestic league appearances and goals as of 09:45, 22 December 2020 (UTC)

Casper Heesch Olesen (born 10 May 1996) is a Danish footballer who plays as a midfielder.

== Club career ==
=== SønderjyskE ===
At the age of 19, Olesen was promoted to the first team squad in January 2015.

Olesen got his Superliga debut on 6 December 2015. Olesen started on the bench, but replaced Andreas Oggesen in the 85th minute in a 1–0 victory against Esbjerg fB in the Danish Superliga.

Olesen extended his contract in May 2016 until the summer 2018. The winger broke his leg in the beginning of August 2017, and was out the rest of the year.

=== Weiche Flensburg ===
On 22 July 2019, Olesen moved abroad to Germany and joined Regionalliga Nord club SC Weiche Flensburg 08. Olesen left the club in the summer 2021.
