= Nikoline Nielsen (handballer) =

Danish handball player (born 1987)

Personal information
- Full name: Nikoline Lindquist Nielsen
- Nationality: Danish
- Born: 3 October 1987 (age 39) Aalborg, Denmark
- Height: 180 cm (71 in)

Sport
- Sport: Handball
- Position: Left back

Youth career
- Years: Team
- –: Ålholm IF

Senior clubs
- Years: Team
- 2006-2007: Lyngby HK
- 2007-2011: Odense Håndbold (under various club names)
- 2011-2012: Slagelse FH
- 2012-2013: Team Esbjerg
- 2017-2018: Gudme HK
National team
Years	Team	Apps	(Gls)
2007-2010	Denmark	9	(11)

Nikoline Nielsen (born 3 October 1987) is a Danish former left back handballer, who played for Slagelse FH.

== Her clubs ==
She became a league player, when she changed from the Danish First Division club Lyngby HK in 2007 to GOG. When they merged with Odense hf to Odense GOG (becoming HC Odense) she continued to play at the new club. Before Lyngby HK she played for Ålholm IF and Hillerød.

== National team ==
She debuted on the Danish national team on 16 October 2007, and played nine games and scored 11 goals over a 3-year period. After being out in two years because of an injury, she was selected for the national team again in August 2010.
