= Bjur =

Bjur is a Danish surname. Notable people with the surname include:

- Jan Bjur (born 1965), Danish footballer
- Ole Bjur (born 1968), Danish footballer
- Peter Bjur (born 2000), Danish footballer, son of Ole
