= European Leagues =

Sports organisation

- Formation: 6 June 2005
- Headquarters: Nyon, Switzerland
- Members: 35 European professional football leagues; 14 Women's league members and associates
- Official language: English, French, German
- President of the Board: (Switzerland) Claudius Schäfer
- Vice-President of the Board: (England) Mathieu Moreuil
- Website: europeanleagues.com

European Leagues (EL) is a sports organisation within association football created for growth of professional football in Europe.

== History ==
Created in 1997, originally under the name Association of the European Union Premier Professional Football Leagues (EUPPFL).

The name was changed to European Professional Football Leagues (EPFL) in 2005, then to European Leagues (EL) in April 2018.

== Members ==
Members of EPFL in 2026:

=== Regular ===
Country	League	Affiliation	Competitions
Albania	Liga Profesioniste e Futbollit	2022	Kategoria Superiore
Austria	Österreichische Fußball Bundesliga	2005	Bundesliga; 2. Liga
Azerbaijan	Azerbaijan Professional Football League	2013	Premier League; I Division; Cup; Super Cup
Belgium	Pro League	2005	Pro League; Challenger Pro League; Belgian Cup; Super Cup
Bulgaria	Bulgarian Professional Football League	(2007–2012; 2022)	Bulgarian A Professional Football Group; Bulgarian B Professional Football Group; Bulgarian Cup
Czech Republic	Czech League Football Association	2018	Czech First League; National Football League
Denmark	Divisionsforeningen	2005	Superliga; 1. division 2. division 3. division Danish Cup
England	FA Premier League	2005	Premier League
England	English Football League	2006	EFL Championship; EFL League One; EFL League Two; EFL Cup; EFL Trophy
Finland	The Finnish Football League Association	2005	Veikkausliiga; Liigacup
France	Ligue de Football Professionnel	2005	Ligue 1 Ligue 2 Trophée des Champions
Germany	Deutsche Fußball Liga	2005	Bundesliga; 2. Bundesliga; DFL-Supercup
Greece	Super League Greece	2005	Super League Greece
Israel	Israeli Professional Football Leagues	2014	Premier League; Liga Leumit
Italy	Lega Serie A	2005 (Note: Lega Serie A was established in 2010. The date of accession indicate the period during which the Lega was unified and the top two divisions of Italy, called Lega Calcio.)	Serie A Coppa Italia; Supercoppa
Italy	Lega B	2011	Serie B
Italy	Lega Pro	2008	Serie C Coppa di C Supercoppa di C
Kazakhstan	Professional Football League of Kazakhstan	2015	Premier League; First League; Cup; Super Cup
Malta	Malta Premier League	2022	Malta Super League; Malta Premier League
Norway	Norsk Toppfotball	2007	Eliteserien; 1. divisjon
Netherlands	Eredivisie CV	2005	Eredivisie
Poland	Polish Professional Football League	2007	Ekstraklasa; Super Cup
Portugal	Liga Portugal	2005	Liga Portugal 1 Liga Portugal 2 Taça da Liga
Romania	Liga Profesionistă de Fotbal	(2009–2011); 2014	Liga 1 Cupa Ligii
Russia	Russian Football Premier League	2007	Championship; Super Cup
Scotland	Scottish Professional Football League	2005 (Note: SPFL is a continuation of The Scottish Premier League)	Premiership; Championship; League 1 League 2 League Cup; Challenge Cup
Serbia	Serbian Superliga	2010	Super Liga
Spain	LaLiga	2005	LaLiga; LaLiga 2
Sweden	Swedish Elite Football	2005	Allsvenskan; Superettan
Switzerland	Swiss Football League	2005	Super League; Challenge League
Ukraine	Ukrainian Premier League	2009	Championship; Super Cup

=== Associate ===
Country	League	Affiliation	Competitions
Germany	Deutscher Fußball-Bund	2021	3. Liga
Ireland	League of Ireland	2022	Men's Premier Division; Men's First Division; Men's FAI Cup; Men's President's Cup; LOI Academy Development Programme
~~Russia~~	Football National League	2011	First Division; Cup
~~Russia~~	Association Professional Football League	2007	Second Division (West / Centre / South / Ural-Povolzhe / East)
Turkey	Turkish Union of Clubs	2010	Süper Lig
Wales	Football Association of Wales	2023	Cymru Premier; Cymru South; Cymru North; Ardal Leagues (North West; North East; South East; South West)

=== Former ===
Former EPFL members:

- (Slovenia) Association of 1. SNL (2006–2012, changed object action)
- Professional Football League of Ukraine (1997–2008, replaced)

==== Development ====
Country	Organisation	Affiliation	Competitions
Latvia	Futbola Virslīga	2018	Virslīga
Lithuania	Lithuanian Football Clubs Association A lyga	2018	A lyga
Northern Ireland	Northern Ireland Football League	2019	Premiership; Championship; Premier Intermediate League; League Cup

=== Women's League Members ===
Country	Organisation	Competitions
Belgium	Pro League	Belgian Women's Super League
Denmark	Ligaforbundet	A-Liga
England	WSL Football	Women's Super League; Women's Super League 2
Iceland	Icelandic Topfootball	Besta deild kvenna
Northern Ireland	Northern Ireland Women's Football Association	NIFL Women's Premiership
Scotland	Scottish Women's Premier League	Scottish Women's Premier League; Scottish Women's Premier League 2 Scottish Women's Premier League Cup
Spain	Liga Profesional de Fútbol Femenino	Liga F
Sweden	Elitfotboll Dam	Damallsvenskan; Elitettan

=== Women's League Associate Members ===
Country	Organisation	Competitions
France	Ligue féminine de football professionnel	Première Ligue
Germany	Frauen-Bundesliga	Frauen-Bundesliga
Ireland	League of Ireland	League of Ireland Women's Premier Division; FAI Women's Cup; Women's All-Island Cup; Women's President's Cup
Italy	Serie A Women	Serie A Women
Netherlands	Vrouwen Eredivisie	Vrouwen Eredivisie
Wales	Adran Premier	Adran Premier

== Governance ==
=== Board of Directors (2025–2029) ===
Member	Position	Affiliation
(Switzerland) Claudius Schäfer	President	Swiss Football League
(England) Mathieu Moreuil	Vice-President	Premier League
(Belgium) Lorin Parys	Member	Pro League
(Denmark) Claus Thomsen	Member	Divisionsforeningen
(Spain) Javier Tebas	Member	LaLiga
(France) Benjamin Viard	Member	Ligue de Football Professionnel
(Germany) Marc Lenz	Member	Deutsche Fußball Liga
(Italy) Luigi De Siervo	Member	Lega Serie A
(Italy) Paolo Bedin	Member	Lega B
(Netherlands) Jan de Jong	Member	Eredivisie CV
(Poland) Marcin Animucki	Member	Ekstraklasa
(Scotland) Neil Doncaster	Member	Scottish Professional Football League
(Slovakia) Michal Mertinyak	Member	Únia ligových klubov

=== List of chairs ===
Holder	Affiliation	Term
(England) Dave Richards	Premier League	1997–2013 (Note: EUPPFL (1997–2005); EPFL (2005–2013))
(France) Frédéric Thiriez	Ligue de Football Professionnel	2013–2016 (Note: EPFL)
(Sweden) Lars-Christer Olsson	Swedish Professional Football Leagues	2016–2021 (Note: EPFL (2016–2018); European Leagues (2018–2021))
(Denmark) Claus Thomsen	Divisionsforeningen	2021–2023
(Portugal) Pedro Proença	Liga Portugal	2023–2025
(Switzerland) Claudius Schäfer	Swiss Football League	2025–present

== See also ==
- European Football Clubs
- UEFA
- ULEB
- World Leagues Association
