= 1964 Danish 3rd Division =

Danish 3rd Division
- Season: 1964
- Dates: 26 March – 15 November 1964
- Champions: Holbæk B&IF (1st title)
- Promoted: Holbæk B&IF; AIA
- Relegated: Skovshoved IF; Kolding IF
- Matches: 132
- Goals: 512 (3.88 per match)
- Top goalscorer: Flemming Jensen (18 goals)

The 1964 Danish 3rd Division (Danish: Danmarksturneringens 3. division 1964) was the twenty-third season of the Danish third-tier association football division since its establishment in 1936 as part of the Danmarksturneringen's nation-wide league structure. Governed by the Danish FA, the season was launched on 26 March 1964 with two fixtures and concluded with the last four matches on 15 November 1964. Skovshoved IF and Hellerup IK entered as relegated teams from last season's second division, while Svendborg fB and Nakskov BK entered as promoted teams from the 1963 Kvalifikationsturneringen. The twelve teams in the division entered the 1964–65 Danish Cup in the cup tournament's first round proper.

Holbæk B&IF won the league, securing their first third-tier league title on the last match day, while gaining promotion to the second division for the first time in the club's history, with AIA becoming the runners-up and returning to the second-tier after two years absence. The two clubs with the fewest points in the final league standings, Skovshoved IF and Kolding IF, were relegated to the 1965 Kvalifikationsturneringen. Forward Flemming Jensen of IK Skovbakken was the league's top goal scorer with 18 goals, scoring four goals on the last match day, one more than Fritz Hansen of BK Frem Sakskøbing that finished in second place.

== Summary ==
The 1964 season of the third tier was inaugurated on 26 March with two Maundy Thursday matches, namely Lyngby BK against AIA at Lyngby Stadium in front of 1,100 spectators and newly relegated Hellerup IK versus IK Skovbakken, that finished the previous season in the league's third place just outside the promotion spots, at Gentofte Stadium. The second match was played following the conclusion of the first match of the top-flight league season at the same stadium. The first match day, scheduled to take place over the course of three Easter days, was marked by frost at night and snow and thaw during the day, forcing two matches to be rescheduled to another day and one match to be moved from the morning to afternoon on the same day. The first goal of the season was a penalty kick executed by Lyngby BK's centre forward Per Holger Hansen in the 35th minute — the penalty was awarded due to a tackle committed by AIA's right back Kaj Nielsen against Lyngby BK's left innerwing Knud Christensen. The first hat-trick of the season was netted by IK Chang Aalborg's Erik Sørensen in the 5–0 home win on 30 March at Aalborg Stadium against Skovshoved IF.

Additional under-18 youth players from Lyngby Boldklub's 1962 Danish Youth Championship winning team (Ynglinge-DM; 4–1 win against Kjøbenhavns BK in the final) joined the club's senior men's team at the beginning of the season — seven players from the same youth team had already joined the senior ranks last season. The Kongens Lyngby-based team hence featured the youngest squad in the Danmarksturneringen with an average age of 19½ years. The club managed to win their first four games; 2–0 against AIA, 6–2 against Roskilde BK, 6–1 against Kolding IF and 1–0 against BK Frem Sakskøbing, positioning themselves in one of the top spots of the league standings following the conclusion of the spring season. However, they could not keep their momentum and was overtaken by AIA, which had lost their first two league matches, during the spring season.

Holbæk B&IF secured their promotion on matchday 20 and the league title on the last matchday with a 5–3 home win over Kolding IF on 15 November. Arbejdernes Idrætsklub Aarhus (AIA) was the second team to gain promotion to the second tier. Skovshoved IF experienced their third relegation in the previous four seasons, ending the season in the second last spot following a 5–2 loss in the last match against IK Skovbakken at Riisvangen Stadium. IK Skovbakken's forward Flemming Jensen scored four goals on the final matchday against Skovshoved IF to clinch the league's top-scoring title, pushing BK Frem Sakskøbing's Fritz Hansen's 17 goals to a second place. Kolding IF finished the season in the last spot, returning to the fourth division after having played four seasons in the third tier.

Despite playing for a club at the third tier, Hellerup IK's international footballer, centre forward and national team captain Ole Madsen was named Danish Football Player of the Year in late October 1964.

== Teams ==
Twelve teams competed in the league – eight teams from the previous season, two teams relegated from the second tier and two teams promoted from the fourth tier. The promoted teams were Svendborg fB, who entered the third-tier league for the first time in the club's history, and Nakskov BK, returning after a four-year absence. They replaced KFUM København and BK Rødovre, ending their third-tier spells of two and three years respectively. The relegated teams were Skovshoved IF, experiencing their second relegation in three years, and Hellerup IK, returning after a three-year absence, replacing Hvidovre IF, who got promoted to the second-tier for the first time, and Næstved IF, who returned to the second division, ending their three-year spell in the third-tier.

=== Stadiums and locations ===
Locations of the 1964 Danish 3rd Division teams.

Club	Location	Stadium	Capacity	Ref
Holbæk B&IF	Holbæk	Holbæk Stadium		
AIA	Viby J, Aarhus	Aarhus Idrætspark	22,000	
Hellerup IK	Gentofte	Gentofte Stadium	16,300	
IK Skovbakken	Vejlby, Aarhus	Riisvangen Stadium		
Lyngby BK	Lyngby	Lyngby Stadium	15,000	
Roskilde BK	Roskilde	Roskilde Idrætspark		
IK Chang Aalborg	Aalborg	Aalborg Stadium	22,000	
BK Frem Sakskøbing	Sakskøbing	Sakskøbing Stadium		
Svendborg fB	Svendborg	Høje Bøge Stadium		
Nakskov BK	Nakskov	Nakskov Idrætspark		
Skovshoved IF	Gentofte	Gentofte Stadium	16,300	
Kolding IF	Kolding	Kolding Stadium		

=== Personnel ===
Team	Head coach (Note: The line-up for each game was decided by members of a match selection committee, referred to as udtagelseskomite (UK) or spilleudvalg, while the coach was responsible for the physical training and game tactics. The rules stated that the coach was not allowed to instruct his players from the bench.)	Captain	Ref
Holbæk B&IF	(Denmark) Ejnar Olsen		
AIA	(Denmark) Aage Holm (Note: Aage Holm coached AIA with fitness coach Carl Nielsen, having previously been part of the club's match selecting committee.) (Denmark) Carl Nielsen		
Hellerup IK	(Denmark) Eyvind Berger	(Denmark) Ole Madsen	
IK Skovbakken	(Denmark) Henry From		
Lyngby BK	(Denmark) Leo Thorvald Nielsen		
Roskilde BK	(Denmark) Ole Bjerregaard		
IK Chang Aalborg	(Denmark) Hans Jensen	(Denmark) Bent Jensen	
BK Frem Sakskøbing	(Denmark) Egon Christoffersen		
Svendborg fB	(Denmark) Svend Hugger		
Nakskov BK	(Denmark) Niels Erik Bertelsen		
Skovshoved IF	(Denmark) Erik Kuld Jensen		
Kolding IF	(Austria) Walter Pfeiffer (Note: Walter Pfeiffer was contractually employed from 1 January 1964 until his sacking on 14 July 1964.) (Denmark) Tage Søgård (Note: Tage Søgård took over as coach on 24 July 1964 for the remaining part of the season.)	(Denmark) Jørgen Lildballe	

=== Coaching changes ===
Team	Outgoing coach	Manner of departure	Date of vacancy	Position in table	Incoming coach	Date of appointment	Ref
Skovshoved IF	(Denmark) Aksel Christensen	End of caretaker spell	30 November 1963	Pre-season	(Denmark) Erik Kuld Jensen	1 January 1964	
Lyngby BK	(Denmark) Fritz Godtfredsen	End of contract	31 December 1963	Pre-season	(Denmark) Leo Thorvald Nielsen	1 January 1964	
Holbæk B&IF	(Denmark) Egon Knudsen	End of contract	31 December 1963	Pre-season	(Denmark) Ejnar Olsen	1 January 1964	
AIA	(Denmark) Jens ”Skrald” Nygaard	End of contract	31 December 1963	Pre-season	(Denmark) Aage Holm (Denmark) Carl Nielsen	1 January 1964	
Kolding IF	(Denmark) Arnold "Noller" Petersen	End of contract	31 December 1963	Pre-season	(Austria) Walter Pfeiffer	1 January 1964	
IK Chang Aalborg	(Denmark) Erik "Skotte" Rasmussen	Resigned	31 December 1963	Pre-season	(Denmark) Hans Jensen	1 January 1964	
Roskilde BK	(Denmark) Børge Pedersen	End of contract	31 December 1963	Pre-season	(Denmark) Ole Bjerregaard	1 January 1964	
BK Frem Sakskøbing	(Hungary) Tivadar Szentpetery	End of contract	31 December 1963	Pre-season	(Denmark) Egon Christoffersen	1 January 1964	
Kolding IF	(Austria) Walter Pfeiffer	Sacked	14 July 1964	12th	(Denmark) Tage Søgård	24 July 1964	

== League table ==
Every team played two games against the other teams, at home and away, totaling 22 games each. Teams received two points for a win and one point for a draw. If two or more teams were tied on points, places were determined by goal average. The team with the most points were crowned winners of the league. The winners and the runners-up were promoted to the 1965 Danish 2nd Division, while the two teams with the fewest points would be relegated to the 1965 Kvalifikationsturneringen.

Pos	Team	Pld	W	D	L	GF	GA	GR	Pts	Promotion, qualification or relegation
1	Holbæk B&IF (C, P)	22	15	3	4	50	29	1.724	33	Promotion to the 1965 Danish 2nd Division
2	AIA (P)	22	14	3	5	50	26	1.923	31	Promotion to the 1965 Danish 2nd Division
3	Hellerup IK	22	10	7	5	37	25	1.480	27	
4	IK Skovbakken	22	10	3	9	46	38	1.211	23	
5	Lyngby BK	22	10	3	9	42	36	1.167	23	
6	Roskilde BK	22	9	4	9	48	40	1.200	22	
7	IK Chang Aalborg	22	11	0	11	52	47	1.106	22	
8	BK Frem Sakskøbing	22	8	5	9	48	39	1.231	21	
9	Svendborg fB	22	8	3	11	36	54	0.667	19	
10	Nakskov BK	22	7	3	12	39	52	0.750	17	
11	Skovshoved IF (R)	22	6	3	13	34	58	0.586	15	Relegation to the 1965 Kvalifikationsturneringen
12	Kolding IF (R)	22	4	3	15	30	68	0.441	11	Relegation to the 1965 Kvalifikationsturneringen

Rules for classification: 1) Points 2) Goal average
(C) Champions; (P) Promoted; (R) Relegated

== Results ==
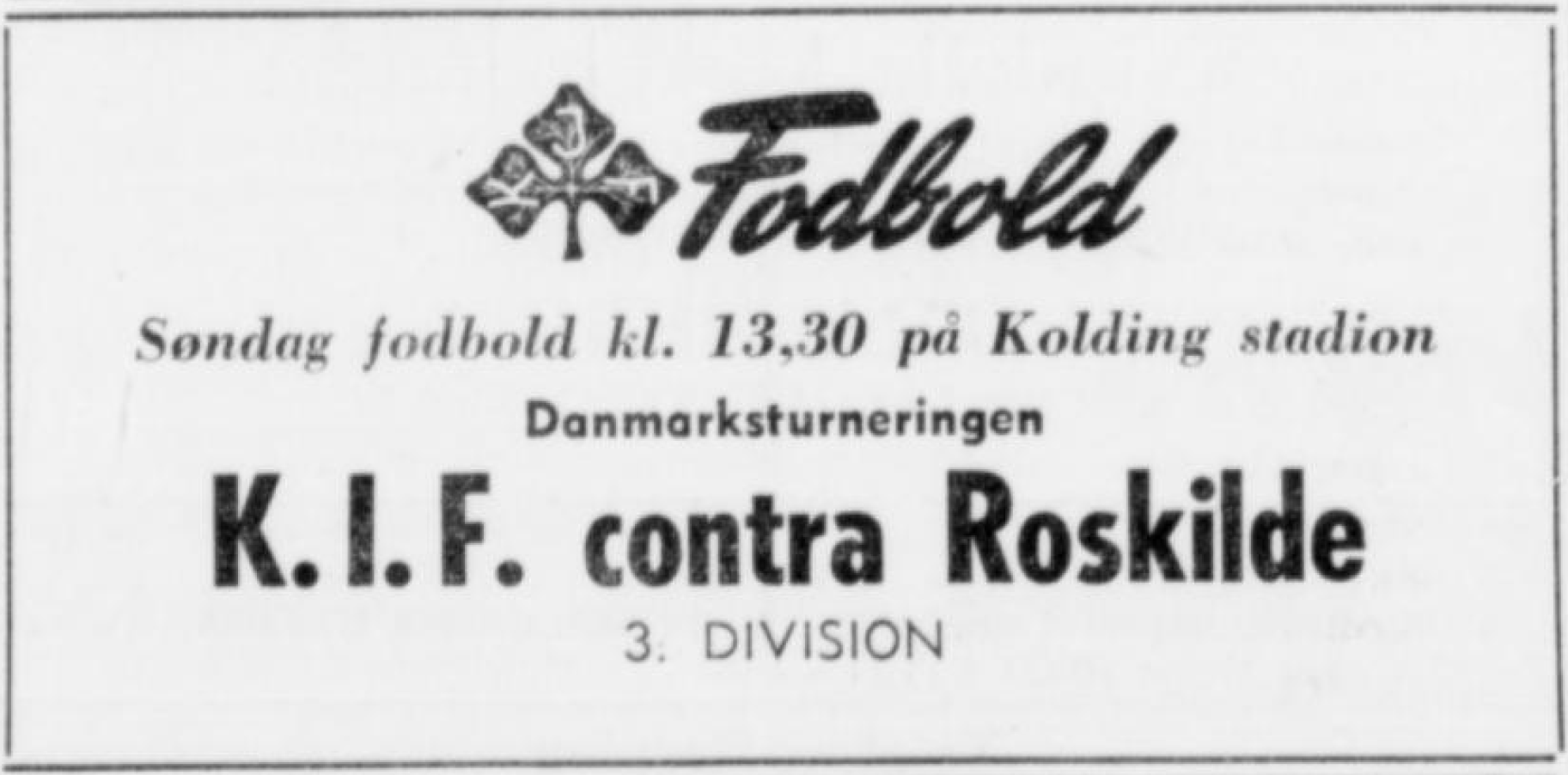
Regional newspaper advertisement for the league match on 3 May between Kolding IF and Roskilde BK at Kolding Stadium.

Home \ Away	HBI	AIA	HIK	IKS	LBK	RBK	IKC	BFS	SFB	NBK	SIF	KIF
Holbæk B&IF	—	2–1	1–2	5–2	3–2	1–1	6–0	3–2	3–1	1–2	6–0	5–3
AIA	2–0	—	0–2	2–0	5–0	4–0	1–3	4–0	5–1	2–1	2–1	3–1
Hellerup IK	0–2	0–1	—	3–1	0–0	1–1	2–3	0–1	1–1	1–1	4–2	2–0
IK Skovbakken	1–2	1–1	2–3	—	1–1	3–0	1–0	2–2	6–0	3–1	5–2	6–0
Lyngby BK	0–1	2–0	0–1	1–2	—	2–1	1–3	4–4	1–3	5–1	0–1	6–1
Roskilde BK	1–1	2–3	2–2	2–0	2–6	—	3–1	5–1	5–0	2–0	2–4	5–0
IK Chang Aalborg	1–2	0–1	1–3	0–4	1–2	3–1	—	1–3	5–3	5–3	5–0	3–1
BK Frem Sakskøbing	7–2	0–0	2–2	1–2	0–1	3–0	5–0	—	1–2	3–1	1–1	3–1
Svendborg fB	0–0	2–4	0–6	0–1	4–0	2–0	1–6	2–0	—	6–0	3–0	0–2
Nakskov BK	1–2	3–3	3–0	3–1	0–2	1–5	2–1	2–1	4–0	—	6–2	2–3
Skovshoved IF	0–1	2–4	1–2	5–1	0–3	1–6	1–3	3–2	1–1	2–0	—	4–0
Kolding IF	0–1	3–2	0–0	4–1	2–3	1–2	1–7	1–6	3–4	2–2	1–1	—

Legend: Blue = home team win; Yellow = draw; Red = away team win.

== Statistics ==
=== Scoring ===
==== Top scorers ====
Rank	Player	Club	Goals
1	(Denmark) Flemming Jensen	IK Skovbakken	18
2	(Denmark) Fritz Hansen	BK Frem Sakskøbing	17
3	(Denmark) Peter Nielsen	BK Frem Sakskøbing	16
3	(Denmark) Jørgen Jørgensen	Holbæk B&IF	16
5	(Denmark) John Nielsen	Nakskov BK	15
6	(Denmark) Bjarne Jensen	IK Chang Aalborg	14
6	(Denmark) Per Holger Hansen	Lyngby BK	14
8	(Denmark) Erik Sørensen	IK Chang Aalborg	13
9	(Denmark) Finn Thygesen	AIA	12
9	(Denmark) Per Møller Hansen	Svendborg fB	12
11	(Denmark) Helge Ussing	Skovshoved IF	11
11	(Denmark) Ole Frikke	IK Skovbakken	11

==== Hat-tricks ====
Player	For	Against	Result	Date	Ref
(Denmark) Erik Sørensen	IK Chang Aalborg	Skovshoved IF	5–0 (H)	30 March 1964	
(Denmark) Flemming Jensen^{4}	IK Skovbakken	Skovshoved IF	5–2 (H)	15 November 1964	

- ^{4} Player scored 4 goals

=== Discipline ===
==== Player ====
- Most warnings: 1
  - (Denmark) Poul Pedersen (AIA) against Lyngby BK on 26 March
  - (Denmark) Donny Vollertsen (Skovshoved IF) against IK Chang Aalborg on 29 March
  - (Denmark) Bjarne Jensen (IK Chang Aalborg) against Skovshoved IF on 29 March
  - (Denmark) Palle Reimer (Roskilde BK) against Kolding IF on 3 May
