= DBU Bredde =

Danish football organization

- Formation: 1970; 56 years ago
- Type: Sports organisation
- Headquarters: DBU Allé 1, 2605 Brøndby
- Location: Fodboldens Hus, Denmark
- Members: DBU Bornholm; DBU København; DBU Fyn; DBU Jylland; DBU Lolland-Falster; DBU Sjælland
- Chairperson: Bent Clausen (DBU Jutland)
- Formerly called: Foreningen af Lokalunioner i Danmark (1970–2019)

DBU Bredde is a special interest organization for grassroots association football in Denmark (Danish: breddefodbold) and the six regional associations under the Danish Football Association (DBU); DBU Bornholm, DBU Copenhagen, DBU Funen, DBU Jutland, DBU Lolland-Falster and DBU Zealand. DBU Bredde is one of three formal members of the Danish FA (the others being Divisionsforeningen and Kvindedivisionsforeningen), is subject to the laws and regulations of the national association, and elects two out of seven members to the board of the Danish FA. The nationwide organization consists of a board of representatives and a board of directors (the chairmen of each regional football association and an observer), representing their member's political and strategic interests towards the Danish FA, men's professional football represented by Divisionsforeningen (DF), women's elite football represented by Kvindedivisionsforeningen (KDF), referees represented by Danish Football Referee Association (DFU), and the national and local municipalities. Areas of co-operation between the members include the education of coaches and referees, counseling on club development, and volunteering.

Founded in 1970 as Foreningen af Lokalunioner i Danmark (FLU), it was renamed DBU Bredde on 3 March 2019.

== History ==
=== Founding, disagreements and new relegations ===
The organization was originally established as Foreningen af Lokalunioner i Danmark (FLU) in 1970 to promote co-operation on common affairs between the Danish FA's six regional football associations and to ensure the development of Danish grassroots association football. In 1981, it was formalized that the FLU became one of the two members of the national football association alongside the Divisionsforeningen (representing the Danish elite clubs). Beginning with the 1982-season, common tournament regulations at a regional level went into effect, although special rules for some of the regional associations meant that they were not completely aligned. Changes to a regional football tournament's rules had to be approved at the FLU's annual meeting, before they officially could take effect locally.

During the 1980s, there were ongoing discussions between the elites and grassroots on how much influence the elite should have especially with regard to the number of votes the Divisionsforeningen should have at the Danish FA's Board of Representatives meeting and the number of representatives on the national football association's board – the grassroots clubs held greater representation than the Divisionsforeningen. In 1991, the FLU put forward a proposal for a structural change that would organizationally divide the Danish FA into a grassroots and an elite section with the Danish FA on top, which was confirmed the same year. The participants at FLU's Board of Representatives meeting held on 7 February 1998 at Vissenbjerg adopted an amendment, which halved the FLU's board from twelve to six members, meaning that moving forwards there would only be one representative from each of the DBU's regional associations. On 3 March 2019, the name was changed to DBU Bredde after an approval by the Danish FA's board of directors at a board of representatives meeting.

In the early years of professional football in Denmark, amateur clubs received up to DKK 30,000 in compensation, when a home-grown player signed his first contract with a Danish club. However, the Bosman ruling abolished this so-called national transfer system, making it voluntary for Danish professional clubs to send so-called training compensation and solidarity constribution checks to amateur clubs for a player's development. In 2006, the FLU proposed a national transfer system inspired by FIFA's rules for international transfers, that was implemented in 2001, and the national regulations already in use since 2005 and 2006 in Swedish and Norwegian football, but it was rejected by the Divisionsforeningen and never truly debated. On 26 January 2013, a new agreement negotiated between the FLU and Divisionsforeningen went into effect that guaranteed compensation financially via a fixed distribution key for amateur clubs' training and talent development, if a Danish football player signed a contract with a Danish professional club, and when the player was sold to another club.

=== Organizational reformation ===
As a consequence of the constant disagreements between the elite and grassroots members of the national association, it became publicly known ahead of the DBU's representatives meeting on 22 February 2003 at Odense, that the DBU's management would be working towards structural changes, which included dissolving five of the existing regional associations and creating two new large units representing East and West Denmark, with the proposed border being at Little Belt, reducing the numbers of clubs in the Danmarksturneringen i fodbold and reducing the number of DBU board members. On 20 June 2015, a new agreement, referred to as Breddeaftalen, regarding grassroots football was reached with the Danish FA, that would give the FLU more responsibility and greater influence with regard to children's and youth football, club counseling and grassroots education, among other things. These tasks previously lay with the grassroots department of the Danish FA at their offices in Brøndby. A central element in that agreement was to set up a committee to prepare a modernization proposal for a reformation of FLU with the intent of strengthening the political, strategic and administrative organization and grassroots football development. The proposal made involved reorganizing the FLU at a regional level to only include two new regional members in West and East Denmark by merging DBU Jylland and DBU Fyn into DBU Bredde Vest, and merging DBU Sjælland, DBU København, DBU Lolland-Falster and DBU Bornholm into DBU Bredde Øst, which would officially take effect on 1 January 2022. The agreement on the reform was made on the condition that it was approved at delegate and council meetings in all six regional associations. Five regional associations had already voted in favor of the reform proposal in 2021. On 17 August 2021, DBU København voted against the proposal.

== List of chairpersons ==
- Henning R. Jensen (1989–1998), DBU Jutland
- Benny Hansen (1998–2009), DBU Jutland
- Kurt Bagge-Hansen (2009–2014), DBU Zealand
- Henrik Ravnild (2014–2018), DBU Copenhagen
- Lars Albæk (2018–2022), DBU Bornholm
- Bent Clausen (2022–present), DBU Jutland
