= Ole Bjur =

Danish footballer (1968–2026)

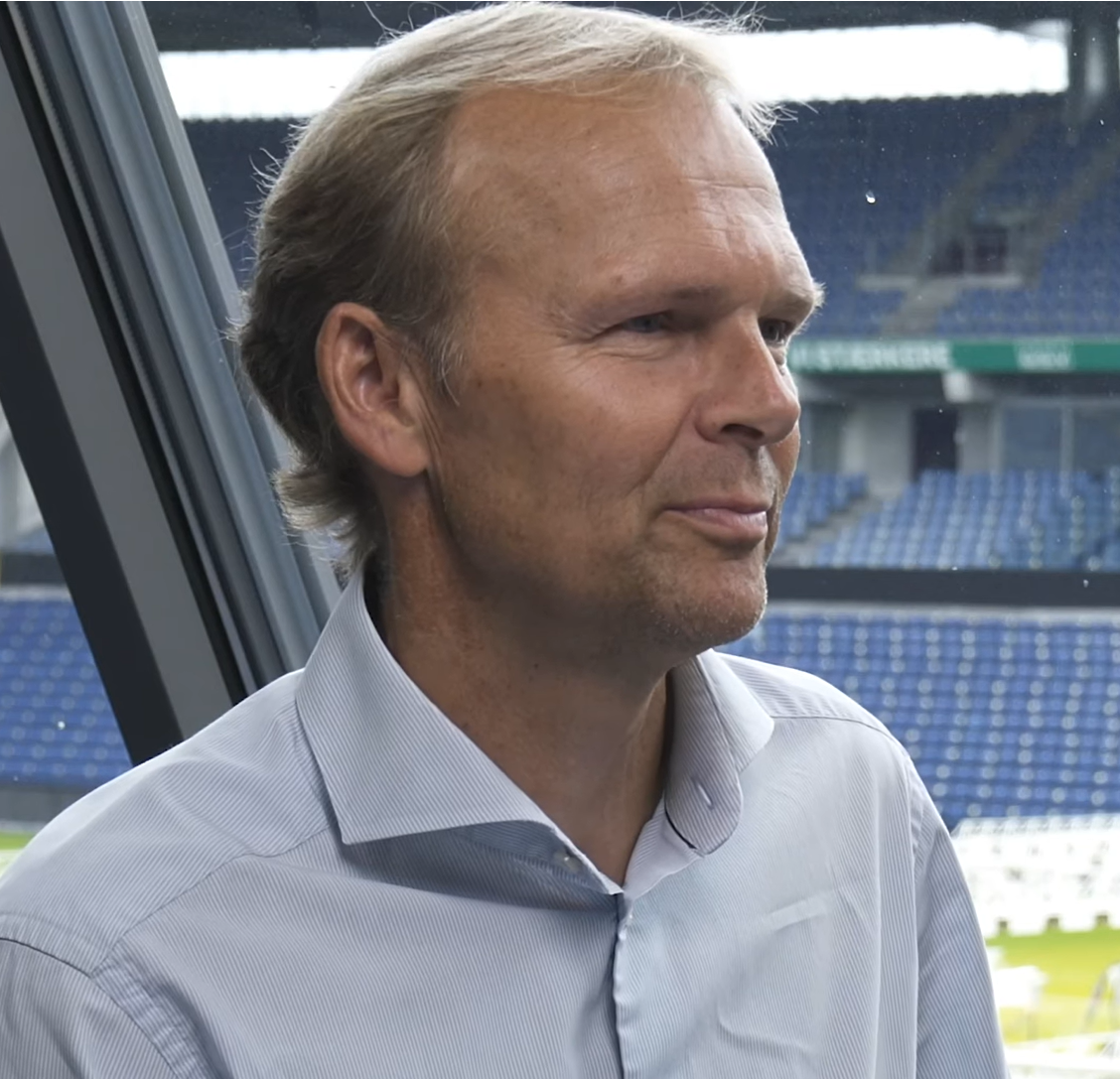
- Bjur in 2020

Personal information
- Date of birth: 13 September 1968
- Place of birth: Rødovre, Denmark
- Date of death: 24 August 2026 (aged 57)
- Place of death: Herlev, Denmark
- Height: 1.83 m (6 ft 0 in)
- Position: Midfielder

Senior career*
| Years | Team | Apps | (Gls) |
| 1986–1991 | Vanløse | | |
| 1991–2000 | Brøndby | 284 | (40) |

International career
| 1996–1997 | Denmark | 3 | (1) |

Managerial career
- 2011–2013: Brøndby (sporting director)
- 2013–2015: Fremad Amager (sporting director)
- * Club domestic league appearances and goals

Ole Bjur (13 September 1968 – 24 August 2026) was a Danish footballer and sporting director. He played 384 matches for Brøndby, with whom he won three Danish Superliga championships and two Danish Cups, and appeared three times for the Denmark national team, scoring on his debut. An attacking midfielder or right midfielder, he was known for his technique and dribbling. After retiring he returned to Brøndby as sporting director from 2011 to 2013, held the same role at Fremad Amager and later at the Divisionsforeningen, where he became a leading figure in the reform of Danish youth development.

Bjur was the younger brother of Danish footballer Jan Bjur, and father of Peter Bjur.

== Club career ==
Born in Rødovre, Bjur started playing football with Vanløse IF in the second-tier Danish 2nd Division. When the structure of Danish football was altered in 1991, Vanløse was placed in the second-tier Danish 1st Division. At Vanløse, Bjur showed himself as a forward with good finishing and eye for the game, and was named 1991 Danish 1st Division Player of the Year. This attracted the attention of defending Danish champions Brøndby IF, and Bjur moved to the top-flight Danish Superliga club in July 1991.

Under Brøndby manager Morten Olsen, Bjur saw a lot of playing time, but had a hard time scoring goals. When Brøndby hired new manager Ebbe Skovdahl in 1992, he went on to deploy Bjur in a right wingback position, where Bjur was immediately praised for his performance. From his wingback position, he would both engage in elegant, dribbling runs as well as hit precise crosses. In the opening of the 1993–94 Superliga season, Bjur saw a slump in form. He got his only red card while at Brøndby in September 1993, and was eventually left out of the Brøndby first team and played a number of games in the reserve team. He returned to form in October 1993, and became one of Brøndby's leading men for set pieces. With Skovdahls change of tactics, to a 3–4–3 formation in March 1994, Bjur was moved up to a forward position, behind the lone striker Mark Strudal, where he reproduced the attacking play of his Vanløse days.

For the 1994–95 Superliga season, Skovdahl changed the formation to a 4–4–2 system, and Bjur settled into the right-sided midfielder spot. He found a good understanding with right back Søren Colding, and the two formed a dangerous pairing on Brøndby's right flank. Bjur was a part of the Brøndby which won the 1994 Danish Cup, his first trophy in his Brøndby career, and was named 1994 Brøndby IF Player of the Year. In the 1995–96 Superliga season, Bjur played all 32 games as Brøndby won their first Danish championship in five years. He also scored the winning goal in the 2–1 defeat of Roma in the 1995–96 UEFA Cup tournament, though Brøndby were eventually eliminated on the away goals rule.

With Brøndby, Bjur went on to win the 1996–97 Superliga and 1997–98 Superliga championships, as well as the 1998 Danish Cup trophy. He was a part of Brøndby's campaign in the 1998–99 UEFA Champions League tournament, and played a total of 54 games for Brøndby in the European competitions. After more and more games of not feeling satisfied with his own performances, he decided to end his career in November 2000, 32 years old. He went on to concentrate on his studies at the University of Copenhagen.

== International career ==
Following his Brøndby breakthrough in the 1992–93 Superliga season, Bjur was touted as a coming man for the Danish national team. However, after his slump in form for Brøndby in fall 1993, he was not chosen for the Danish national team by national manager Richard Møller Nielsen.

Bjur was eventually included in the national team squad of newly appointed national manager Bo Johansson in the summer 1996. Bjur was called up for Johansson's first game in August 1996. He scored the winning goal in their debut match, as Denmark beat Sweden 1–0 in a friendly match. Bjur started the next national team match, but after 22 minutes, he suffered a minor concussion from a swung elbow, and had to be substituted off. Bjur was then displaced by midfielder Peter Nielsen for the next national team games, before playing his last international game in August 1997.

== Later career ==
Bjur returned to Brøndby IF in 2010 as a consultant to the coaching staff, working as assistant to manager Henrik Jensen for eight matches. He was appointed the club's sporting director the following year and held the post until the summer of 2013. He then filled a similar role at Fremad Amager from 2013 to 2015.

He later joined the Divisionsforeningen, the association of Danish professional clubs, as its sporting director. In its obituary the organisation described him as the central figure in establishing the modern era of Danish talent development, which it called one of the greatest successes in the country's football and the backbone of most of its clubs.

== Death ==
Bjur died on 24 August 2026, at the age of 57, following a ten-year battle with cancer. He had been admitted to Herlev Hospital about two and a half weeks earlier. His death was announced by his family, and tributes were paid by Brøndby IF and the Divisionsforeningen, the latter's director Claus Thomsen praising his knowledge of the game and his warmth towards others.

== Career statistics ==
=== Club ===
Appearances and goals by club, season and competition
| Club | Season | League | | | Danish Cup | | Europe | | Other | | Total | |
| Club | Season | Division | Apps | Goals | Apps | Goals | Apps | Goals | Apps | Goals | Apps | Goals |
|---|---|---|---|---|---|---|---|---|---|---|---|---|
| Vanløse | 1987 | Danish 2nd Division | | | | | — | | — | | | |
| Vanløse | 1988 | Danish 2nd Division | | | | | — | | — | | | |
| Vanløse | 1989 | Danish 2nd Division | | | | | — | | — | | | |
| Vanløse | 1990 | Danish 2nd Division | | | | | — | | — | | | |
| Vanløse | 1991 | Danish 1st Division | | | | | — | | — | | | |
| Vanløse | Total | | | | | | 0 | 0 | 0 | 0 | | |
| Brøndby | 1991–92 | Danish Superliga | 20 | 3 | 1 | 0 | 5 (Note: Appearances in European Cup/UEFA Champions League) | 0 | — | | 26 | 3 |
| Brøndby | 1992–93 | Danish Superliga | 30 | 1 | 1 | 0 | 5 (Note: Appearances in Intertoto Cup) | 1 | — | | 36 | 2 |
| Brøndby | 1993–94 | Danish Superliga | 29 | 2 | 4 | 0 | 9 (Note: Four appearances and one goal in Intertoto Cup, five appearances in UEFA Cup) | 1 | — | | 42 | 3 |
| Brøndby | 1994–95 | Danish Superliga | 32 | 6 | 2 | 0 | 7 (Note: Three appearances and one goal in Intertoto Cup, four appearances in UEFA Cup) | 1 | 1 (Note: Appearance in Danish Super Cup) | 0 | 42 | 7 |
| Brøndby | 1995–96 | Danish Superliga | 32 | 6 | 4 | 0 | 8 (Note: Appearances in UEFA Cup) | 3 | 3 (Note: Appearances in Danish League Cup) | 2 | 47 | 11 |
| Brøndby | 1996–97 | Danish Superliga | 30 | 4 | 4 | 1 | 9 (Note: Two appearances and two goals in UEFA Champions League, seven appearances and one goal in UEFA Cup) | 3 | — | | 43 | 8 |
| Brøndby | 1997–98 | Danish Superliga | 32 | 6 | 3 | 1 | 4 (Note: Two appearances in UEFA Champions League, two appearances in UEFA Cup) | 0 | 1 | 1 | 40 | 8 |
| Brøndby | 1998–99 | Danish Superliga | 32 | 6 | 4 | 1 | 8 | 0 | — | | 44 | 7 |
| Brøndby | 1999–2000 | Danish Superliga | 29 | 3 | 3 | 0 | 6 (Note: Four appearances and one goal in UEFA Champions League, two appearances in UEFA Cup) | 1 | — | | 38 | 4 |
| Brøndby | 2000–01 | Danish Superliga | 18 | 3 | 1 | 0 | 6 (Note: Four appearances in UEFA Champions League, two appearances in UEFA Cup) | 0 | — | | 25 | 3 |
| Brøndby | Total | | 284 | 40 | 27 | 3 | 67 | 10 | 5 | 3 | 383 | 56 |
| Career total | | | 284+ | 40+ | 27+ | 3+ | 67 | 10 | 5 | 3 | 383+ | 56+ |

=== International ===
Appearances and goals by national team and year
| National team | Year | Apps | Goals |
|---|---|---|---|
| Denmark | 1996 | 2 | 1 |
| Denmark | 1997 | 1 | 0 |
| Total | | 3 | 1 |

Score and result list Denmark's goal tally first, score column indicates score after Bjur goal.

International goal scored by Ole Bjur
| No. | Date | Venue | Cap | Opponent | Score | Result | Competition | Ref. |
|---|---|---|---|---|---|---|---|---|
| 1 | 14 August 1996 | Ullevi, Stockholm, Sweden | 1 | Sweden | 1–0 | 1–0 | Friendly | |

== Honours ==
Brøndby

- Danish Superliga: 1995–96, 1996–97, 1997–98
- Danish Cup: 1993–94, 1997–98
- Danish Super Cup: 1994, 1996, 1997

Individual

- Danish 1st Division Player of the Year: 1991
- Brøndby Player of the Year: 1994
