= Peter Bjur =

Danish footballer (born 2000)

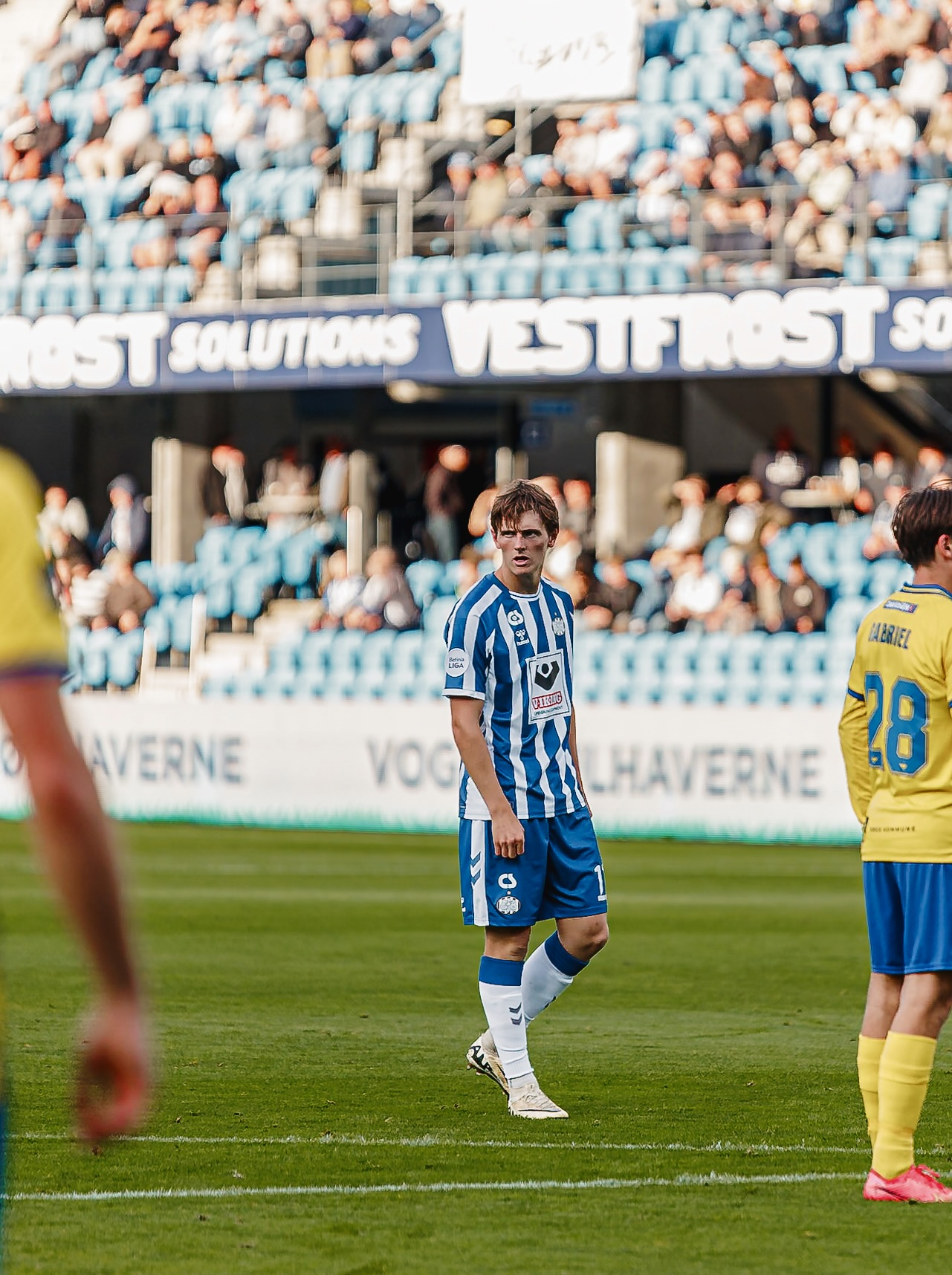
- Bjur in 2025

Personal information
- Full name: Peter Nicolai Kruse Bjur
- Date of birth: 2 February 2000 (age 26)
- Place of birth: Rødovre, Denmark
- Height: 1.81 m (5 ft 11 in)
- Positions: Midfielder; winger

Team information
- Current team: Esbjerg fB
- Number: 11

Youth career
- 2005–2014: Avarta
- 2014–2017: B.93
- 2017–2019: Brøndby

Senior career*
Years	Team	Apps	(Gls)
2016–2017	B.93	14	(2)
2019–2023	Brøndby	31	(0)
2023–2024	AGF	17	(1)
2024–	Esbjerg fB	39	(2)

International career
2017–2018	Denmark U17	1	(0)
2018	Denmark U18	1	(0)
- * Club domestic league appearances and goals as of 13:43, 24 April 2026 (UTC)

Peter Nicolai Kruse Bjur (Danish pronunciation: [ˈpʰe̝ˀtɐ ˈpjuɐ̯ˀ]; born 2 February 2000) is a Danish professional footballer who plays as a midfielder for Danish 1st Division club Esbjerg fB. He has represented Denmark at youth level. He is the son of Ole Bjur, who played for Brøndby IF and the Denmark national team.

== Early and personal life ==
Bjur was born in Rødovre, a suburb of Copenhagen, and grew up there. His father, Ole Bjur, was a professional player for Brøndby and a Denmark international, and later worked as a sporting director at Brøndby, Fremad Amager and Divisionsforeningen; he died of cancer on 24 August 2026 at the age of 57. His uncle, Jan Bjur, is also a former professional footballer.

== Club career ==
=== Early career ===
Bjur began his career at BK Avarta, having his first practice the day after turning five years old. He played in Avarta for several years before moving to B.93 as an under-15 player. He made his senior-team debut as a seventeen-year-old on 1 March 2017, coming on as a 35th-minute substitute in a 3–0 loss to Danish Superliga club F.C. Copenhagen in the Danish Cup round of 16 at Parken Stadium.

=== Brøndby ===
On 1 July 2017, Bjur signed a three-year contract with Brøndby IF and joined the club on under-17 level. On 15 August 2019, he made his first team debut as a 73rd-minute substitute for Simon Hedlund against Portuguese opposition Braga in Brøndby's UEFA Europa League play-offs, scoring an 85th-minute goal. A few days later, on 18 August, Bjur made his Danish Superliga debut coming on as a second-half substitute against AaB. As the summer transfer window closed, the club stated that they did not want to loan out Bjur, despite the squad being too large. On 13 December, he signed a new three-and-a-half-year contract with Brøndby, running until 2023. He made his only second league appearance for the club on 5 July 2020, coming on as a second-half substitute in a 2–0 loss to AaB in the Superliga.

Prior to the 2020–21 season, in pre-season friendlies against Næstved Boldklub, FC Helsingør, OB and English side Crystal Palace, Bjur was utilised at the left wing-back position. On his positional change, he stated: "Of course, moving down and playing on the wing-back is a bit of an upheaval. But many of the skills I have previously used on the right wing are some of the same things that recur on the wingback". Head coach Niels Frederiksen subsequently praised Bjur's performances on the new position.

On 13 September, on the first matchday of the new season, Bjur made his first start for Brøndby at the left wing-back position in a 3–2 home win over Nordsjælland. After starter Blás Riveros fell out with a serious knee injury in November 2020, Bjur took over as starter at left wing-back, but he himself fell out with an injury in a match against AGF on 7 December.

=== AGF ===
On 27 January 2023, Bjur signed a four-year contract with AGF. He scored his first goal for the club on 14 May 2023, exploiting a mistake from opposing goalkeeper Andreas Hansen to secure a 1–1 home draw against Nordsjælland.

=== Esbjerg fB ===
On 16 August 2024, recently promoted Danish 1st Division club Esbjerg fB announced the signing of Bjur on a three-year contract. He made his debut for the club the following day, coming on as a substitute in a 3–1 home win over Vendsyssel. On 24 August, he scored his first goal for Esbjerg in a 4–1 home victory against HB Køge, helping the team move into second place in the league table.

== International career ==
Bjur has won two caps for Denmark at U17 and U18 level.

== Career statistics ==
As of match played 24 August 2024

Appearances and goals by club, season and competition
Club	Season	League			Danish Cup		Europe		Total	
Club	Season	Division	Apps	Goals	Apps	Goals	Apps	Goals	Apps	Goals
B.93	2016–17	Danish 2nd Divisions	14	2	1	0	—		15	2
Brøndby IF	2019–20	Danish Superliga	3	0	0	0	1 (Note: Appearances in UEFA Europa League)	1	4	1
Brøndby IF	2020–21	Danish Superliga	21	0	0	0	—		21	0
Brøndby IF	2021–22	Danish Superliga	3	0	1	0	0	0	4	0
Brøndby IF	2022–23	Danish Superliga	4	0	0	0	3 (Note: Appearances in UEFA Europa Conference League)	0	7	0
Brøndby IF	Total		31	0	1	0	4	1	36	1
AGF	2022–23	Danish Superliga	11	1	0	0	—		11	1
AGF	2023–24	Danish Superliga	6	0	2	0	1	0	9	0
AGF	Total		17	1	2	0	1	0	20	1
Esbjerg fB	2024–25	Danish 1st Division	3	1	0	0	—		3	1
Career total			65	4	4	0	5	1	74	5

== Honours ==
Brøndby

- Danish Superliga: 2020–21
