= Jan Bjur =

Danish footballer and coach (born 1965)

Personal information
- Date of birth: 4 August 1965 (age 61)
- Place of birth: Copenhagen, Denmark
- Height: 1.81 m (5 ft 11 in)
- Position: Midfielder

Senior career*
Years	Team	Apps	(Gls)
1985–1993	Vanløse		
1993–1995	Brønshøj		
1995–2001	AB	148	(20)

Managerial career
- 2011–2013: Allerød FK
- * Club domestic league appearances and goals

Jan Bjur (born 4 August 1965) is a Danish former professional footballer who played as a midfielder for Vanløse, Brønshøj and AB, and who has since worked as a coach and sporting director. He won the 1999 Danish Cup with AB.

== Playing career ==
Bjur played for Vanløse from 1985 to 1993 and for Brønshøj from 1993 to 1995 before joining AB, where he spent the rest of his career. He made 148 appearances and scored 20 goals for AB in the Danish Superliga between 1996 and 2001, and was part of the side that won the Danish Cup in 1999.

== Coaching career ==
Bjur was appointed head coach of Allerød FK in June 2011. The club ended the arrangement with immediate effect while fighting relegation from the Denmark Series, citing results and its finances, and parted with Bjur and his assistant Morten Røndum on good terms.

He later returned to Vanløse as assistant to head coach Jesper Holdt. The pair took the club from the Denmark Series, to which it had been relegated in 2014, up to the Danish 2nd Division, where it finished second in the eastern group. Both left when their contracts expired in the summer of 2020. He has since been sporting director of Vanløse.

== Personal life ==
Bjur is the older brother of the footballer Ole Bjur, who played for Brøndby and Denmark and died in 2026, and the uncle of Ole's son Peter Bjur.

== Honours ==
AB

- Danish Cup: 1998–99
