= Hugo Andersson =

Hugo Andersson may refer to:

- Hugo Andersson (1930s footballer), Swedish footballer for Malmö FF
- Hugo Andersson (footballer, born 1999), Swedish footballer for Randers FC
