= Ligaforbundet =

Danish women's association football organization

- Logo used since July 2025
- Formation: 1 February 1981; 45 years ago
- Type: Sports organisation
- Headquarters: DBU Allé 1, 2605 Brøndby
- Location: Fodboldens Hus, Denmark
- Members: 30 football clubs (per 2025)
- Key people: Katja Moesgaard (chairperson); Marie Greve (director)
- Website: www.ligaforbundet.dk
- Formerly called: Damedivisionsforeningen (1981–2005); Kvindedivisionsforeningen (2005–2025)

Ligaforbundet, shortened to LF, is a trade, special interest and employers' organisation for women's professional association football in Denmark and the elite clubs (or their companies) that partake in the Danish Women's League, A-Liga, B-Liga and C-Liga, representing their interests, primarily towards the Danish Football Association (DBU), the Danish Football Players' Association (SF) and the local municipalities. The association's secretariat is located at the offices of the Danish FA at Fodboldens Hus, DBU Allé 1 in Brøndby. While the national FA is the organiser of the women's nation-wide league and cup tournaments, the women's organisation has a say in their marketing, guidelines, structure and development. They have previously organised an unofficial football tournament, called Grand Prix turneringen.

Founded in 1981 under the name Foreningen af Dame DM og DS klubber, commonly referred to as Damedivisionsforeningen (DDF), the organization adopted its current name on 20 July 2025 as part of a rebranding strategy that removed the reference to women. Kvindedivisionsforeningen is subject to the laws and regulations of the Danish FA, with its members being part of the board of representatives, DBU's highest decision-making body. The women's organisation is represented by Divisionsforeningen, one of two formal members of the national organisation, and has signed an association agreement with the men's own organisation. Those member clubs, that partake in the Danmarksturneringen i kvindefodbold (Kvinde-DM), choose one of DBU's board members.

== History ==
Talks about the formation of an organisation began in 1979, when the Danish FA made the decision to introduce a nation-wide women's top-flight league. At a meeting between the women's league club representatives, held on 27 January 1980 in Odense, a committee chaired by John Robert Larsen (Fortuna Hjørring) was set up to pave the way for the establishment of a women's league association. Foreningen af Dame DM og DS klubber, known as Damedivisionsforeningen, shortened to DDF, was officially founded at a general meeting at Grand Hotel in Odense, held on 1 February 1981. The articles of association from the men's Divisionsforeningen was used as inspiration for the new women's league organisation. At the foundation, the members included women's teams from the two nation-wide divisions, that was made up of Danmarksturneringen i kvindefodbold (Dame-DM) and Dame-Danmarksserien (Dame-DS).

In the second year of existence, the women's organisation launched a magazine focusing on women's football and related topics, named Fokus Damefodbold, which evolved into the magazine Kridtstregen in the late 1980s. The first edition of Kridtstregen was published by Damedivisionsforeningen on 1 February 1990, printed in a circulation of 4,000 copies with approximately 120 clubs as subscribers, and had the former footballer John Witting as the editor-in-chief. By 1996, Kridtstregen had become the largest magazine on women's football in Europe, with a circulation of 5,800 copies published five times annually, featuring a staff of 10 writers, and included subscribers from Sweden, Norway, Iceland and Faroe Islands. The last edition of the magazine was reportively published some time around March 2010.

In the late 1980s and early 1990s, DDF organized an unofficial football tournament for the top-flight teams, named Grand Prix-turneringen, which preliminary rounds was played in the winter months with the final play-offs held in June/July, sometimes in connection with the Vorup Damefodbold-Cup tournament. The 1990 edition featured a cash prize of DKK 7,500 to the winners, a reduction of the cash prize in 1988 of DKK 11,000 (of out a total of DKK 24,500).

At the Danish FA's Board of Representatives meeting in Odense on 24 February 1996, a narrow majority decided to expand the board from 15 to 16 members to make room for a representative for women's association football. On 13 March 1996, at a meeting with the clubs in the two top divisions in Aarhus, the then 26 years old chairperson of DDF, Gyrithe Kjær (Kolding BK's women's department), was chosen as the newest and youngest member of the Danish FA's board, becoming the first female member in the history of the national association. This seat was challenged in the fall of 2017, when the size of the board was to be reduced from sixteen to seven members, but eventually the vote to abolish the women's representative did not go through at the national association's board of Representatives meeting on 3 March 2018, following criticism from among others the Danish FA's own Women's Committee (2017–2018) chaired by former Prime Minister Helle Thorning-Schmidt, vice-rector at the University of Copenhagen Lykke Friis and Hummel executive Christian Stadil.

At the annual general assembly meeting on 30 January 2005, the name was changed to Foreningen af Kvinde DM og DS klubber, known as Kvindedivisionsforeningen, in conjunction with the new Danish term for women's association football. The membership requirements changed during the 2000s to include teams partaking in the Women's Under-18 tournament, while a reduction of the organisation's members took place in the summer of 2013, when the clubs of the Kvinde-Danmarksserien (Kvinde-DS) were excluded due to the league's reorganisation and the regional football associations become the league's organisers. The official full name of the organisation hence became Foreningen af Kvinde DM og U18 DM klubber, before being simplified to Foreningen af Kvinde DM klubber. The formal admission of clubs in the newly formed 2nd Division as members in KDF took place in January 2022.

An association agreement between Kvindedivisionsforeningen and Divisionsforeningen (DF) was signed in February 2014 with the aim of strengthening mutual cooperation and the development of both men's and women's elite football clubs in mind. Over the course of an year, KDF and the Danish FA jointly prepared a report named Den Nye Kvindeliga, published on 26 November 2018, that largely revolved around the brand built-up, commercial strategy, player contracts, league structure and solutions for the relaunch of women's top-flight league, with the ambitious goal of it becoming the best league for women's team sports in the country. Since the fall of 2007, they have also participated in the negotiations and agreements signed with the Danish Football Referee Association (DFU) and the Danish FA regarding fees and terms for refereeing women's matches in the first and second divisions including the national cup tournament. With the introduction of the Danish Women's League ahead of the 2019–20 season, negotiations between the Kvindedivisionsforeningen and the Danish Football Players' Association regarding a collective agreement for new players signing contracts in the top-flight league were started.

On 20 July, a new visual identity, developed in collaboration with the design bureau Nord ID, was unveiled, with the rebranding including a new logo and renaming the organisation to Ligaforbundet, removing any reference to women.

In April 2024 Ligaforbundet became a part of the Danish Football Association in an official capacity, alongside its two other components, Divisionsforeningen and DBU Bredde.

== List of chairpersons ==
- Gyrithe Kjær, Kolding BK (1995–200?)
- Jørgen Nielsen, Hillerød GI Damefodbold (200?–200?)
- Ole Svenningsen, Vejle BK (2005–200?)
- Birgit M. Schrøder, (IK Skovbakken and) Brøndby IF (2007–2014)
- Karl Brynningsen, Varde IF (2014–201?)
- Kim Kjærhus (acting), KoldingQ (201?)
- Jan Borre, Brøndby IF (2015–2018)
- Kim Kjærhus, Næsby BK (2018–2021)
- John Walsh (acting), Ballerup-Skovlunde Fodbold (2021)
- Katja Moesgaard, AGF Kvindefodbold (Note: When Katja Moesgaard joined KDF's board on 13 June 2021, she had no club affiliation, but became associated with AGF on 28 October 2022, when she was elected as a new board member of AGF A/S.) (2021-present)

== Name and logos ==
Names and logos used in the organisation's history:

Kvindedivisionsforeningen
(2013–2024)

Kvindedivisionsforeningen
(2024–2025)

Ligaforbundet
(2025–present)
