= Österreichische Fußball Bundesliga =

Austrian Football League

- Founded: 1991; 34 years ago
- Country: Austria
- Confederation: UEFA
- Divisions: Bundesliga; 2. Liga
- Number of clubs: 28
- Domestic cup: Austrian Cup
- Current champions: Sturm Graz (2024–25)
- Broadcaster(s): Domestic; ORF; Sky Sport Austria; International; OneFootball (Selected international markets)
- Website: www.oefbl.at/de

The Österreichische Fußball-Bundesliga, literally Austrian Federal Football League, is the body that manages the most important football championships in Austria . It was founded in 1991 and is headquartered in Vienna. It is a founding member of European Leagues.

It has 27 member clubs and organizes the two professional championships of Bundesliga and 2nd Liga, where reserve teams are welcome.

== History ==
Professionalism in football arrived in Austria with the Wiener Fußball-Verband, in 1924. But it was only after the Second World War, in 1949, that an organization bringing together the country's professional clubs was born: it was the Österreichische Fußball-Staatsliga, which governed the first (Staatsliga A) and second (Staatsliga B) division championships. In 1974, however, the Austrian Football Federation officially dissolved the league and took over the organization of the championships. Only in 1991 did the clubs form an autonomous association again, the Österreichische Fußball-Bundesliga, operational from 1 December of that year. Formally it is a non-profit association.

It is constituted in the form of eingetragener Verein and is one of the 10 members of the association, together with the 9 football associations of land.

== Links ==
- Official website
