= Pro League (Belgium) =

Belgian professional football organisation

- Founded: 1974
- Country: Belgium
- Confederation: UEFA
- Divisions: Belgian Pro League; Challenger Pro League; Belgian Women's Super League
- Number of clubs: 26
- Level on pyramid: 1–2
- Domestic cup(s): Belgian Cup; Belgian Super Cup
- Website: www.proleague.be

The Pro League (formerly Ligue professionnelle de Football / Liga Beroepsvoetbal and Profliga) is a Belgian association football organisation founded in 1974. It is a non-profit association that represents professional football clubs in Belgium and organises the country's main professional competitions. It is affiliated with European Leagues.

== History ==
The Pro League was founded in 1974 as the Liga Beroepsvoetbal following the growth of professional football in Belgium. It was established under the leadership of three influential figures in Belgian football: Constant Vanden Stock, Fernand De Clerck and Roger Petit, who became its first president.

The organisation's purpose is to develop and promote professional football in Belgium and protect the interests of professional clubs. In 1997, it became one of the founding members of the European Leagues.

The organisation was renamed Pro League after a decision by the general assembly on 6 October 2008.

The Pro League currently manages:

- Belgian Pro League (men's first division)
- Challenger Pro League (men's second division)
- Belgian Cup (men's cup competition)
- Belgian Super Cup (men's super cup competition)
- Belgian Women's Super League (women's top division)

== Membership ==
The Pro League is composed of professional football clubs in Belgium. Clubs must meet requirements including:

- having legal personality;
- being recognised as a professional club by the Royal Belgian Football Association;
- holding the required professional licence;
- qualifying for professional competition on sporting grounds;
- having suitable stadium facilities meeting Pro League standards.

== Presidents ==
Period	President
1974–1981	Roger Petit
1981–1986	Michel D'Hooghe
1986–1996	Roger Vanden Stock
1996–1999	Eddy Wauters
2001–2007	Jean-Marie Philips
2007–2012	Ivan De Witte
2012–2013	Ronny Verhelst
2013	José Zurstrassen (interim)
2013–2014	Michel Dupont
2014–2015	Peter Quaghebeur (interim)
2015–2018	Roger Vanden Stock
2018–2019	Marc Coucke
2019–2021	Peter Croonen
2022	Vincent Mannaert & Wouter Vandenhaute (interim)

== Chief Executive Officers ==
Period	CEO
2007–2015	Ludwig Sneyers
2015–2022	Pierre François
2022–present	Lorin Parys
