= Walter Pfeiffer (footballer) =

Austrian footballer and manager

Personal information
- Date of birth: 12 June 1927
- Place of birth: Austria
- Date of death: 10 May 2014 (aged 86)
- Place of death: Germany
- Position: Midfielder

Senior career*
Years	Team	Apps	(Gls)
1951–1952	Stuttgarter Kickers		

Managerial career
- 1955–1957: PAOK
- 1959–1960: AGF
- 1960–1962: B 1909
- 1963–1964: Kolding IF
- 1965: B 1901
- 1968: KR
- 1968: Iceland
- 1969–19xx: SC Eisenstadt
- * Club domestic league appearances and goals

Walter Pfeiffer (12 June 1927 – 10 May 2014) was an Austrian football manager and former player. He managed the Iceland national team in 1968.

He also coached PAOK FC, AGF, B 1909, KR, SC Eisenstadt
