= Kanal Sport =

Kanal Sport, was a sports TV-channel, broadcasting from Denmark, in Danish. The channel was free to watch, and was to be found as an online stream on the internet and in the ground packs of some Danish TV providers.

The channel airs lower leagues in football, team handball and other sports. Some examples may be the Danish U/19 national football team, the U/19, U/20 European Handball Championships, Danish volleyball league, lower Danish ice hockey leagues and the Danish third tier of association football.

== History ==
On 17 June 2015, forum.yousee.dk announced that Kanal Sport closes.
