= Divisionsforeningen =

Professional association football organisation in Denmark

- Founded: 2 February 1969; 57 years ago
- Country: Denmark
- Confederation: UEFA
- Divisions: Danish Superliga; Danish 1st Division; Danish 2nd Division; Danish 3rd Division
- Number of clubs: 48
- Level on pyramid: 1–4
- Relegation to: Denmark Series
- Domestic cup: Danish Cup
- Current champions: AGF (2025–26)
- Website: divisionsforeningen.dk

Foreningen af Divisionsklubber i Danmark (English: Danish League), commonly referred to as Divisionsforeningen or shortened to DF (or FDD), is a professionally administered, non-profit trade, special interest and employers' league organization for men's professional association football in Denmark and the elite clubs (or their companies) that partake in the top four Danish leagues, the Superliga, 1st Division, 2nd Division and 3rd Division, representing their interests, especially forwards the Danish Football Association (DBU), the Danish Football Players' Association and the local municipalities. Divisionsforeningen is one of three formal members of the Danish FA (the others being DBU Bredde and Kvindedivisionsforeningen) and is subject to the laws and regulations of the national association. The association's secretariat is located together with the offices of the Danish FA at Fodboldens Hus, DBU Allé 1 in Brøndby. It is the organiser of the Danmarksturneringen i fodbold, the Danish Cup and the Danish Reserve League on behalf of the Danish FA, and responsible for negotiating the television rights for the four professional leagues and the national cup tournament.

Originally founded on 2 February 1969 under the name Foreningen af 1. divisionsklubber under DBU as an association solely for the clubs in the top-flight league, it was renamed Foreningen af Fodbold Divisionsklubber i Danmark after the inclusion of the clubs in the second-tier in 1970 and third-tier in 1971. The Danish league organisation was the founder of the Nordic football tournament, the Royal League, which was run in collaboration with the corresponding Swedish and Norwegian organisations, and had also previously organised the unofficial Danish indoor football championship, Divisionsturneringen and the Danish League Cup. The group was one of the 14 founding members of EUPPFL in 1997, and a founding member in the reorganisation to the European Leagues (EL) in 2005. An association agreement between Divisionsforeningen and Kvindedivisionsforeningen (KDF) was signed in February 2014 with the aim of strengthening mutual cooperation and the development of both men's and women's elite football clubs in mind.

== History ==
At the initiative of Kjøbenhavns BK, on 19 December 1968 the other eleven top-flight clubs were sent invitations to a briefing in Copenhagen on 19 January 1969 to discuss the formation of a league organisation, that could deal with the common issues surrounding the clubs such as salaries to the players and coaches, TV and radio charges, stadium fees, large events and national match days versus match days for clubs. Kjøbenhavns BK had previously floated the idea of forming an advisory body consisting of clubs from the Copenhagen FA (KBU), but at that time it did not gain the necessary support. The organisation was formally founded at a meeting on 2 February 1969 at the offices of Kjøbenhavns BK and was named Foreningen af 1. divisionsklubber under DBU. As indicated by its name, the members of the organisation were 14 clubs: the 12 clubs that partook in the 1969 Danish 1st Division and the previous season's two relegated clubs. The then chairman of BK Frem, Svend Petersen, was selected as the new association's first chairman, vice chairman of Kjøbenhavns BK, Børge Pockendahl, was chosen as vice chairman, Sonny Thomsen of Aalborg BK became the treasurer, while the rest of the board included Ejvind Sørensen (chairman of B 1909) and Svend Erik Bang Sørensen (Aarhus GF). The organisation was not seen as a protest against the Danish FA (DBU) and the organisation of regional football associations (LFU).

The association's first board meeting took place in Aalborg on 4 April 1969, and resulted in common ground on the aspect of identical entrance fees at half price at top-flight league matches for children and old-age and invalidity pensioners across the entire country – the clubs in the 2nd and 3rd divisions received a recommendation from the association to introduce the same scheme. The initiative was welcomed by the Danish FA, who offered to provide the administration. It was also decided to investigate the possibility of taking out a collective accident insurance for the clubs' 25 best players – insurance of all players in the 14 clubs was deemed as not being financially feasible. A condemnation of the Danmarks Idrætsforbund's TV committee for allowing a TV broadcast from the 1969 Ice Hockey World Championships at the same time as the premiere of the Danmarksturneringen, discussion of contracts for advertising on training shirts, attention to unpaid exploitation of players in an advertising context, discussion about disbursing money to players, the issue of standard contracts and identical salaries for professional coaches, and establishing a cooperation with the corresponding Swedish association, was also on the agenda at the meeting. Two board members stated that the new association would be working towards making the game of football in Denmark more attractive, including providing entertainment at matches with the goal of attracting more spectators.

At the formation of the league organisation, it was decided to not initially include the clubs in the 2nd of 3rd divisions. The clubs in the 2nd divisions became members in 1970, while the clubs in the 3rd division became members in 1971. Clubs that were relegated to the fourth division would lose their membership. Despite the short lived Danish professional league (Dansk Professionelt Fodboldforbund; DPF), formed in 1977, failed to organize any activities, this endeavor likely influenced the Danish FA to ease regulations on amateurism in 1978. Divisionsforeningen, whose original mission was to legalize professional football in Denmark, would hence onwards become the sole representative of Danish professional club football.

Since 1999, Divisionsforeningen and its employers' association (Divisionsforeningens Arbejdsgiverforening), representing the football clubs, have entered into collective agreements for the professional football sector with the Danish Football Players' Association, representing the players. To end a long-running dispute involving transfer payment for players under the age of 23, and a week's conflict in August 2004, with Spillerforeningen, renewed negotiations resulted in a new three year collective agreement being signed on 11 October 2004, allowing for transfer fees under certain circumstances among other things.

== List of chairmen and presidents ==
The title of chairman was changed to president in September 2022.

- Svend Petersen, BK Frem (1969–1979)
- Hans Bjerg-Pedersen, Lyngby BK (1979–1994)
- Peter Iversen, AC Horsens (1994–2003)
- Thomas Christensen, BK Skjold and Odense BK (2003–present)
