= Swedish Professional Football Leagues =

Swedish interest organisation

- Föreningen Svensk Elitfotboll
- Abbreviation: SEF
- Formation: 1 December 1928; 97 years ago
- Type: Sports organisation
- Headquarters: Stockholm
- Region served: Sweden
- Members: 32 football clubs
- Secretary General: Johan Lindvall
- President: Jens T Andersson
- Affiliations: European Leagues

Swedish Professional Football Leagues (Swedish: Föreningen Svensk Elitfotboll, the Swedish Elite Football Association, SEF) is a Swedish interest organisation that represents the 32 elite football clubs in the top two divisions (Allsvenskan and Superettan) of the Swedish football league system. SEF does not administer the divisions but acts in cooperation with the Swedish Football Association, the member clubs, sponsors and partners. The goal is to develop Swedish elite football resultwise, economically, commercially and administratively.

== History ==
Swedish Professional Football Leagues was founded in 1928 (under the name Föreningen Svenska Serien Division 1) as a counterpart to the Swedish Football Association, with which top division clubs did not have a well-functioning relationship at that time. The organisation was initially only for clubs playing in the top division Allsvenskan, but in 1939 it was changed so that former top division clubs relegated to Division 2 could remain members. The current name of the organisation was adopted in 1972, and the membership at the time included 14 Allsvenskan clubs, 28 clubs playing in Division 2 and an additional five clubs playing in the third division, Division 3. From 1986 on, it was decided to only give membership to clubs either playing in the top division or the second division (then called Division 1, which became Superettan in 2000).
