= Challenger Pro League =

Football league in Belgium

- Organising body: Pro League
- Founded: 2016; 10 years ago
- Country: Belgium
- Confederation: UEFA
- Number of clubs: 15
- Level on pyramid: 2
- Promotion to: Belgian Pro League
- Relegation to: Belgian Division 1
- Domestic cup: Belgian Cup
- Current champions: Beveren (2025–26)
- Broadcaster(s): DAZN
- Website: www.proleague.be/cpl
- Current: 2026–27 Challenger Pro League

The Challenger Pro League, previously known as 1B Pro League is the second-highest division in the Belgian football league system, one level below the Belgian Pro League. It was created by the Royal Belgian Football Association in 2016, replacing the Belgian Second Division. From the season 2016–17 until 2019–20, the competition was named Proximus League, after the main sponsor Proximus.

== History ==
The Belgian First Division B was created in 2016 as the successor of the Belgian Second Division following an overhaul of the Belgian football league system which saw the number of professional clubs reduced to 24 and the number of teams at the second level of the football pyramid to 8.

During Belgian Second Division era from 1973 to 2016, the second division winner and the play-off winner promote to the first division. From 2016 on, the second division winner is no longer guaranteed promotion. The league is divided in two periods of 15 games. The winners of a period compete each other in a final. If a team wins both periods, no final is played and it automatically rises to the highest level. In 2017, Lierse became champion of the league, but no promotion was allowed because they did not win a period. Antwerp and SV Roeselare played the final.

== Competition format ==
=== Until 2020 ===
From its inception in 2016 until 2020, the season consisted of two separate competitions in which all 8 teams played each other twice. The winners of both competitions faced each other in a two-legged playoff with the winner crowned champions and promoted to the Belgian First Division A.

For the remaining teams, until 2019, the top three teams (excluding the promoted team), played together with the teams finishing in the positions 7 through 15 of the Belgian First Division A in a playoff for a ticket into the UEFA Europa League. The remaining four teams played a relegation playoff, with the last team relegating into the Belgian First Amateur Division. From 2019, the top six teams all took part in the Europa League playoffs (including the promoted team), with only the bottom two teams playing the relegation playoff in which they play each other five times.

=== 2020 to 2022 ===
The 2020–21 and 2021–22 seasons no longer involved two separate competitions, but rather one quadruple round-robin league in which all teams play each other four times. At the end of the season, the top-ranked team was crowned champions and promoted, while the second-placed team earned a two-legged promotion playoff against the 17th-place finisher from the Belgian First Division A for a place in the top division. The team finishing in last place was relegated to the Belgian National Division 1 (renamed from Belgian First Amateur Division).

=== 2022 to 2023 ===
From the 2022–23 season, the league was expanded to 12 teams, as from this season U23-teams no longer play in separate competitions but rather join the regular competition. To accommodate this expansion, the league format was changed again. Now all teams play a regular round-robin round (22 matches), after which the league splits into two halves, with the top 6 teams battling for promotion to the Belgian First Division A which only goes to the top team at the end of the season after 32 matches, while the bottom 6 also meet each other but with the goal of avoiding finishing last as this team will be relegated. Promotion/relegation playoffs are no longer organized, only the top and the bottom team at the end of the season change leagues. Furthermore, U23 teams will be able to be relegated from or promoted into the Belgian First Division B, but cannot earn promotion to the Belgian First Division A. The league was renamed to Challenger Pro League.

=== From 2023 onwards ===
From the 2023–24 season onwards, the league was expanded again to 16 teams, as from this season 4 teams U23 from top tier club will play in separate competitions but rather join the regular competition. After the end of the season, two teams will be directly promoted to Belgian Pro League, four teams will battle in the promotion play-off round with 6 matches. The team that finishes in top position at Play-off round will battle against the 2nd of the relegation play-offs in the Belgian Pro League. The two bottom teams will be directly relegated to Belgian National Division 1.

== Clubs ==
=== Members for 2025–26 ===
For the 2025–26 season the following clubs will take part.

Locations of the 2025–26 Challenger Pro League teams

Club name	City	Last season position	First season of current spell in top division
Beerschot	Antwerp	16th (JPL)	2025–26
Beveren	Beveren	4th	2021–22
Club NXT^{U23}	Bruges	6th	2022–23
Eupen	Eupen	10th	2024–25
Francs Borains	Boussu	12th	2023–24
Jong Genk^{U23}	Genk	15th	2022–23
Jong KAA Gent^{U23}	Gent	1st (D1 VV)	2025–26
Kortrijk	Kortrijk	15th (JPL)	2025–26
Lierse	Lier	8th	2020–21
Lokeren	Lokeren	7th	2024–25
Lommel	Lommel	11th	2018–19
Olympic Charleroi	Charleroi	1st (D1 ACFF)	2025–26
Patro Eisden Maasmechelen	Maasmechelen	5th	2023–24
RFC Liège	Liège	9th	2023–24
RSCA Futures^{U23}	Anderlecht, Brussels	13th	2022–23
RWDM Brussels	Molenbeek	3rd	2024–25
Seraing	Seraing	14th	2023–24

== Past results overview ==
Season	Opening tournament winner	Closing tournament winner	Promotion play-off winner (Champion)	Europa League play-offs qualifiers	Relegated
2016–17	Roeselare	Antwerp	Antwerp	Lierse, Roeselare and Union SG	Lommel United
2017–18	Beerschot Wilrijk	Cercle Brugge	Cercle Brugge	Beerschot Wilrijk, OH Leuven and Lierse	none (Note: Although Tubize finished last and would have been relegated, Lierse went bankrupt and was removed as a team. As a result, Tubize remained in the Belgian First Division B while the matricule of Lierse was removed.)
2018–19	Mechelen	Beerschot Wilrijk	Mechelen	Beerschot Wilrijk, Union SG and Westerlo	Tubize
2019–20	OH Leuven	Beerschot	Beerschot (Note: Both Beerschot and OH Leuven were promoted as the First Division A was expanded to 18 teams.)	not held (Note: Not held due to coronavirus pandemic, Beerschot, Lommel, OH Leuven, Union SG, Virton and Westerlo had qualified.)	Roeselare and Virton (Note: No relegation playoffs were played due to the coronavirus pandemic, but both Roeselare and Virton were relegated as they were refused a professional football license due to insufficient proof of financial solvency. Lokeren went bankrupt and was removed as a team.)
Season	Champion		Promotion play-off qualifier		Relegated
2020–21	Union SG		Seraing (Note: Seraing won the promotion playoff and was promoted as well.)		none (Note: Normally, Lierse Kempenzonen would have been relegated due to finishing in last place (except for Club NXT which was ineligible for promotion/relegation as a youth team). However, the general meeting of the Pro League decided on 16 March that no team would be relegated, as the 2020–21 Belgian National Division 1 had been canceled due to measures taken by the Belgian government against the spread of COVID-19 prohibiting amateur football, causing no team to be promoted from that league to fill the gap.)
2021–22	Westerlo		RWD Molenbeek (Note: RWD Molenbeek lost the promotion playoff and was not promoted.)		Excel Mouscron (Note: Although Virton finished last and would have been relegated, Excel Mouscron was refused a professional football licence and thus relegated instead.)
Season	Regular season winner (Champion)		Promotion play-off qualifier		Relegated
2022–23	RWD Molenbeek		no playoffs this season		Virton
Season	Champion	Runner-up	Promotion play-off qualifiers		Relegated
2023–24	Beerschot	Dender	Deinze, Lommel, Patro Eisden Maasmechelen and Zulte Waregem (Note: Lommel won the promotion playoff between the Challenger Pro League teams, but lost the match against Pro League team Kortrijk and hence also did not get promoted.)		Oostende (Note: Although Seraing finished in 15th place and would have been relegated, Oostende went bankrupt and was removed as a team. As a result, Seraing remained in the Challenger Pro League.) and SL16 FC
2024–25	Zulte Waregem	La Louvière	Beveren, Lokeren-Temse, Patro Eisden Maasmechelen and RWD Molenbeek (Note: Patro Eisden Maasmechelen won the promotion playoff between the Challenger Pro League teams, but lost the match against Pro League team Cercle Brugge and hence also did not get promoted.)		Jong Genk and Deinze (Note: Deinze went bankrupt mid-way throughout the season and dissolved, their results voided. For purposes of relegation it is counted as if finishing last.)
2025–26	Beveren	Kortrijk	Beerschot, RFC Liège, Lommel and Patro Eisden Maasmechelen (Note: Lommel won the promotion playoff between the Challenger Pro League teams, and won the match against Pro League team Dender EH and hence also did get promoted.)		Olympic Charleroi and RWDM Brussels
2026–27	TBD				

== Broadcasting ==
Proximus broadcasts every game whilst it sponsored the league, Telenet broadcasts one random game every week. As of the 2020–21 season, Eleven Sports acquired the broadcasting rights to all professional league games (1A, 1B and the Super Cup) in Belgium.

From 2022–23 onwards, DAZN broadcast game in Challenger Pro League.
