= Danish football league system =

Series of interconnected leagues in Denmark

The Danish football league system, also known as the football league pyramid, refers to the hierarchically interconnected league structure for association football in Denmark, in which all divisions are bound together by the principle of promotion and relegation. Within men's association football, the top two professional levels contain one division each. Below this, the semi-professional and amateur levels have progressively more parallel divisions, which each cover progressively smaller geographic areas. The top four tiers are classed as nationwide, while the fifth tier and below are classed provincial leagues. Teams that finish at the top of their division at the end of each season can rise higher in the pyramid, while those that finish at the bottom find themselves sinking further down. In theory it is possible for even the lowest local amateur club to rise to the top of the system and become Danish football champions one day. The number of teams promoted and relegated between the divisions varies, and promotion to the upper levels of the pyramid is usually contingent on meeting additional criteria, especially concerning appropriate facilities and finances.

The league system is held under the jurisdiction of the Danish FA (DBU), Divisionsforeningen (DF) and its six regional associations. The men's senior league system excludes parallel leagues such as the Reserveliga, which runs in conjunction with primarily the Superliga as a national youth developmental and reserve league. The pyramid for women's football in Denmark runs separately with fewer divisions and levels. The women's top-flight league is semi-professional and additional criteria apply, the higher the team is placed in the league system.

The Danish Workers’ Sport Association (DAI) and Danish Gymnastics and Sports Associations (DGI) organize separate football tournaments at grassroots level or as fitness exercise for adults, with DAI previously having run a separate league system. Company football is also organised outside the influence of the national FA.

== Current structure ==
=== Men's league system ===
The Danish football league system is held under the jurisdiction of the national Danish Football Association (DBU) and its professional body Divisionsforeningen (DF), along with its six regional associations. On top of the hierarchical system sit the level one Superliga, level two 1. division, level three 2. division and the level four 3. division, collectively known as the Danmarksturneringen i fodbold (Herre-DM) and referred to as divisionerne, organised by the Divisionsforeningen. The top-flight league is professional, while the second-tier league consists primarily of professional and semi-professional teams, with the third-tier and fourth-tier being a semi-professional league consisting of primarily semi-professional and amateur teams with some professional teams. The four top levels then are followed by the level five Danmarksserien (Herre-DS), the lowest league classed as nationwide and the highest fully amateur league, operated by the Danish geographical boundaries.

The number of promotions and relegations between the highest regional leagues and below are dependent on the number of regional clubs relegated from the fourth tier. This also includes forced relegations of reserve teams, when the first team is being relegated to a lower level with their reserve team present. Reserve teams and mother clubs to superstructures are not allowed in the first four levels. The Reserveliga was created as a parallel competition outside of the league structure to run in conjunction with primarily the Superliga as a national youth developmental and reserve league. A separate league system exist, consisting of amateur clubs, and governed by the Dansk Arbejder Idrætsforbund (DAI).

The table below illustrates the current structure of the system. For each league, its official name in Danish and number of divisions and clubs is given. Each division promotes to the league(s) that lie directly above it and relegates to the league(s) that lie directly below it.

Level	League(s) / Division(s) (Note: As of the 2025–26 season.)					
	Professional leagues					
1	Superligaen; 12 clubs ↓ 2 relegation spots					
2	1. division 12 clubs; ↑ 2 promotion spots, ↓ 2 relegation spots					
	Semi-professional leagues					
3	2. division 12 clubs; ↑ 2 promotion spots, ↓ 2 relegation spots					
4	3. division 12 clubs; ↑ 2 promotion spots, ↓ 3 relegation spots					
	Non-professional leagues					
5	Danmarksserien; 4 divisions of 10 clubs ↑ 3 promotion spots, ↓ 8 relegation spots					
6	Københavnsserien; 1 division of 14 clubs ↑ 1 promotion spot, ↗ 1 qualification spot, ↓ 5 relegation spots (Note: The exact number of teams relegated or promoted depend on the regional distribution of relegated teams from the tier above.)		Sjællandsserien; 2 divisions of 14 clubs ↑ 2 promotion spots, ↗ 1 qualification spot, ↓ 6 relegation spots		Fynsserien; 1 division of 14 clubs ↑ 1 promotion spot, ↓ 3-4 relegation spots	Jyllandsserien 1; 2 divisions of 8 clubs ↑ 3 promotion spots, ↓ 3-6 relegation spots (Note: All divisions in DBU Jylland are biannual, though promotion to Danmarksserien only occur once a year.)
6	Københavnsserien; 1 division of 14 clubs ↑ 1 promotion spot, ↗ 1 qualification spot, ↓ 5 relegation spots		Sjællandsserien; 2 divisions of 14 clubs ↑ 2 promotion spots, ↗ 1 qualification spot, ↓ 6 relegation spots		Fynsserien; 1 division of 14 clubs ↑ 1 promotion spot, ↓ 3-4 relegation spots	Jyllandsserien 2; 3 divisions of 8 clubs ↑ 3-6 promotion spots, ↓ 6-9 relegation spots
7	DBU Københavns Serie 1; 2 divisions of 12–14 clubs	Bornholmsserien; 1 division of 8 clubs ↑ 1 promotion spot, ↓ 1 relegation spots	DBU Sjællands Serie 1; 2 divisions of 14 clubs	Lolland-Falsterserien; 1 division of 8 clubs ↑ 2 promotion spots, ↓ 1-2 relegation spots	DBU Fyns Serie 1; 4 divisions of 6 clubs	DBU Jyllands Serie 1; 6 divisions of 8 clubs
8	DBU Københavns Serie 2; 3 divisions of 12–14 clubs	DBU Bornholms Serie 1/2; 1 division of 8 clubs	DBU Sjællands Serie 2; 4 divisions of 12 clubs	DBU Lolland-Falsters Serie 1; 1 division of 11 clubs	DBU Fyns Serie 2; 8 divisions of 6 clubs	DBU Jyllands Serie 2; 12 divisions of 8 clubs
9	DBU Københavns Serie 3; 5 divisions of 12–14 clubs	DBU Bornholms Serie 3; 1 division of 12 clubs (Note: As this is the lowest local tier, the number of participating teams may vary every year.)	DBU Sjællands Serie 3; 8 divisions of 12 clubs	DBU Lolland-Falsters Serie 2; 1 division of 12 clubs	DBU Fyns Serie 3; 6 divisions of 12 clubs	DBU Jyllands Serie 3; 24 divisions of 8 clubs
10	DBU Københavns Serie 4; 9 divisions of 9–13 clubs		DBU Sjællands Serie 4; 12 divisions of 12 clubs	DBU Lolland-Falsters Serie 3; 2 divisions of 7-9 clubs	DBU Fyns Serie 4; 8 divisions of 12 clubs	DBU Jyllands Serie 4; 48 divisions of 8 clubs
11	DBU Københavns Serie 5; 4 divisions of 5–13 clubs		DBU Sjællands Serie 5; 10 divisions of 12 clubs			DBU Jyllands Serie 5; 65 divisions of 6 clubs

=== Women's league system ===
The Danish Women's Football League is administered by the Danish Football Association (DBU) in consultation with its special interests body Ligaforbundet (LF), along with its six regional associations. A-Liga is the top-tier, followed by second tier B-Liga, and third tier C-Liga, collectively known as the Danish Women's Football Tournament (Danish: Danmarksturneringen i kvindefodbold, sometimes abbreviated as Kvinde-DM). A-Liga is a semi-professional league, while clubs in the second and third divisions are also allowed to sign semi-professional player contracts. The season culminates with two lowest placed teams of the A-Liga and the four highest placed teams of the B-Liga competing in qualification play-offs for a spot in the top-flight. Non-league fourth tier Denmark Series Women (Danish: Kvindeserien, sometimes abbreviated as Kvinde-DS), the lowest nationwide league, is organised by the regional football associations. The number of local relegated teams from the third-tier to fourth-tier determines the number of promotion and relegation spots between the fourth-tier and below. Reserve teams and mother clubs to superstructures playing at a higher level are only allowed to play in the third tier and below. DBU Lolland-Falster teams participate in the DBU Zealand regional league structure, while DBU Bornholm teams participate in the DBU Copenhagen regional leagues.

The seven levels of women's football in Denmark are structured as follows. Each division promotes to the league(s) directly above it and relegates to the league(s) directly below it.

Level	League(s) / Division(s) (Note: As of the 2025–26 season.)			
	Semi-Professional League			
1	A-Liga; 10 clubs ↓ 0–4 relegation spots			
2	B-Liga; 8 clubs ↑ 0–2 promotion spots, ↓ 0–2 relegation spots			
3	C-Liga; 2 divisions of 6 clubs ↑ 0–2 promotion spots, ↓ 4 relegation spots			
	Non-Professional Leagues			
4	Denmark Series; 6 divisions of 7–12 clubs ↑ 4 promotion spots, ↓ 5–7 relegation spots			
5	Copenhagen Women's League; 10 clubs ↑ 1 promotion spot, ↓ 1 relegation spot	Funen Women's League; 6 clubs ↑ 1 promotion spot, ↓ 2+ relegation spots	Jutland Women's League; 4 divisions of 8 clubs ↑ 4 promotion spots, ↓ 8+ relegation spots	Zealand Women's League; 12 clubs ↑ 1 promotion spot, ↓ 2+ relegation spots
6	DBU Copenhagen Series Women 1; 10 clubs	DBU Funen Series Women 1; 8 clubs	DBU Jutland Series Women 1; 8 divisions of 4–6 clubs	DBU Zealand Series Women 1; 2 divisions of 8–10 clubs
7	DBU Copenhagen Series Women 2; 2 divisions of 6 clubs	DBU Funen Series Women 2; 2 divisions of 5–8 clubs	DBU Jutland Series Women 2; 14 divisions of 4–6 clubs	DBU Zealand Series Women 2; 4 divisions of 3–9 clubs

== System by period ==
=== Men's league history ===
The first domestic club league was founded in 1889 with the establishment of the Fodboldturneringen, comprising seven amateur clubs exclusively based in Copenhagen, deciding the Copenhagen Football Championship and governed by the Danish Football Association (DBU). In the following years, several regional league structures emerged with the establishment of the regional football associations. Five of the newly founded provincial football associations, Jutland FA, Zealand FA, Funen FA, Lolland-Falster FA and Bornholm FA, became part of the Danish Football Association (DBU). With the formation of a regional FA for the capital city in 1903, the administration of the Copenhagen Football League was transferred to the Copenhagen FA. These six regional football competitions were the top-flight leagues, determining the regional club football championship. Between 1912 and 1927, the Danish football championship was determined via a play-off cup tournament at the end of the season, known as the Landsfodboldturneringen.

The first nationwide championship league competition, known as the Danmarksmesterskabsturneringen, had its inaugural season in 1927–28, and the tournament expanded two years later with a secondary national league. There was no avenue for progression between the national top-flight tournament and regional leagues until 1936, where the best clubs were permanently moved out of the highest regional championship leagues. From 1927 to 1935 the Danish league pyramid had two simultaneous and independent pyramids, the national pyramid, and the regional pyramid, and the best clubs were playing in both pyramids. The national league structure was reconstructed after World War II with the formation of three nationwide leagues with an equal number of clubs and matches. The current interconnected league system has been in place since 2004, when the regional leagues were reorganised. Professionalism (then referred to as betalt fodbold) in Danish football was introduced in 1978, but was restricted to the top three levels. In 1986, Brøndby IF became the first Danish club with a squad of full time professional players contracts and the first to be publicly listed in 1987.

=== Men's league timeline ===
The timeline below lists the evolution of the men's tiers and leagues related to the Danish FA since 1889, including the regional league structures of DBU Copenhagen, DBU Jutland and DBU Bornholm, and the regional top-flights of DBU Funen, DBU Zealand and DBU Lolland-Falster. Excluded are Landsfodboldturneringen (1912–13 until 1926–27) and Kvalifikations-Cupturneringen (1946 until 1950), which were end-of-the season cup tournaments, and the first seasons of Kvalifikationsturneringen (1950–51 until 1958) was a qualification tournament held at the end of the season.

=== Women's league timeline ===
The timeline below lists the evolution of the women's tiers and leagues related to the Danish FA and DBU Copenhagen, specifically the women's association football being administered by the Danish FA since 1972. Excluded are the women's national championship in the first two seasons (1973 and 1974), which were end-of-the season cup tournaments.
