= Danish 2nd Division =

Danmarksturneringens 2. division
- Organising body: Divisionsforeningen
- Founded: 1936; 90 years ago
- First season: 1936–37
- Country: Denmark
- Confederation: UEFA
- Divisions: 2 (2018–2021); 1 (from 2021)
- Number of clubs: 28 (2020–2021); 12 (from 2021)
- Level on pyramid: 3
- Promotion to: 1st Division
- Relegation to: 3rd Division
- Domestic cup: Danish Cup (1954–present)
- Current champions: Aarhus Fremad (2024–25)
- Broadcasters: Kanal Sport (2014–2016); Ekstra Bladet PLUS (2019–present)
- Website: 2-division.dk
- Current: 2026–27 Danish 2nd Division

The 2nd Division (Danish: 2. division (Note: The spelling reform of 1948 by the Danish Ministry of Education, known as the 'Retskrivningsbekendtgørelsen fra 1948', meant that the Danish language moved away the practice of writing common nouns with a capital letter. This meant that the spelling of the leagues' official names changed from 1. Division, 2. Division and 3. Division to 1. division, 2. division and 3. division, beginning with the 1950 season.)), also known as CampoBet 2. Division for sponsorship reasons, is a professional association football league for men and the third division in Denmark. It is organised by the Divisionsforeningen on behalf of the Danish Football Association (Danish FA; DBU) as part of the nationwide Danmarksturneringen i fodbold (Herre-DM) and is positioned between the second-tier 1st Division and the fourth-tier Danish 3rd Division in the Danish football league system. Clubs in the league must meet certain criteria concerning appropriate facilities and finances. All of the 2nd Division clubs qualify for the proper rounds of the DBU Pokalen. The number of promoted and relegated clubs has fluctuated over the years. In the 2020–21 season two clubs were directly promoted to the 1st Division, while eight teams were relegated to the Denmark Series. From the 2021–22 season, it was changed to two promotion spots and two relegation spots.

A third-tier league under the auspices of the Danish FA was introduced to the nationwide league structure in 1936, beginning with two divisions of four clubs each in the 1936–37 season. Due to World War II, the league was placed on hiatus for five years until its reintroduction as a single division with 10 clubs in 1945. In the 1966 season, the league was expanded to include two divisions, coinciding with the dissolution of the Kvalifikationsturneringen and the introduction of the new fourth-tier, Denmark Series (Danmarksserien). It returned to a single division format in the 1975 season, before once again converting to a two division format in 1986, a single division in 1997 and a two division format in 2005. From 1991 to 1997 the league was played as semi-annual seasons, when the higher ranking leagues switched to an autumn-spring calendar match schedule while the lower ranking leagues continued with spring-autumn tournaments — a revisit to the same calendar schedule that had been played until 1956. In 2015–2020, the league consisted of two stages; a preliminary round split into 2–3 groups with clubs qualifying for either a promotion or relegation round.

From 1936–37 and 1939–40, 1966 until 1964 and in the 1986 season, a championship final was played at the end of the season to determine the overall league winners between the west and east groups. The short lived Kvalifikationsligaen in the springs from 1992 to 1995 meant that the league's status as the third-tier in Danish football was dropped one level to temporarily become the fourth best level. In the seasons from 2005–06 to 2010–11, the tournament rules were changed to allow a maximum of eight Superliga reserve teams to compete in the third-tier — the reserve teams were eventually moved to the 2011–12 Danish Reserve League upon its creation. The division has changed its name on several occasions. It has previously been known as III Serie (1936–37 until 1939/40; or 3. Serie), 3. Division (1945/46 until 1990; or 3. division), before settling with the current name beginning with the 1991-season. Due to a sponsorship arrangement, it was known as Kanal Sport Divisionen during the 2015–16 season, and since the 2025–26 season as CampoBet 2. Division.

== History ==
=== Formation of national third-tier ===
The decision to establish a nationwide third-tier league as part of the Danmarksturneringen i fodbold below the second-tier II Serie was made at the annual convention of the Danish FA (DBU), in 1936. The league started its operation in August 1936, when III Serie was created with two geographically divided constituencies, each including four teams playing two matches at home and away. Out of the eight teams, only one gained promotion to the second-tier the following season, following the promotion play-offs at the end of the season, which at the same time determined the overall league champions. With the occupation of Denmark during World War II, the Danmarksturneringen's three league structure was disbanded in 1940.

=== Reintroduction of the third-tier 1945 ===
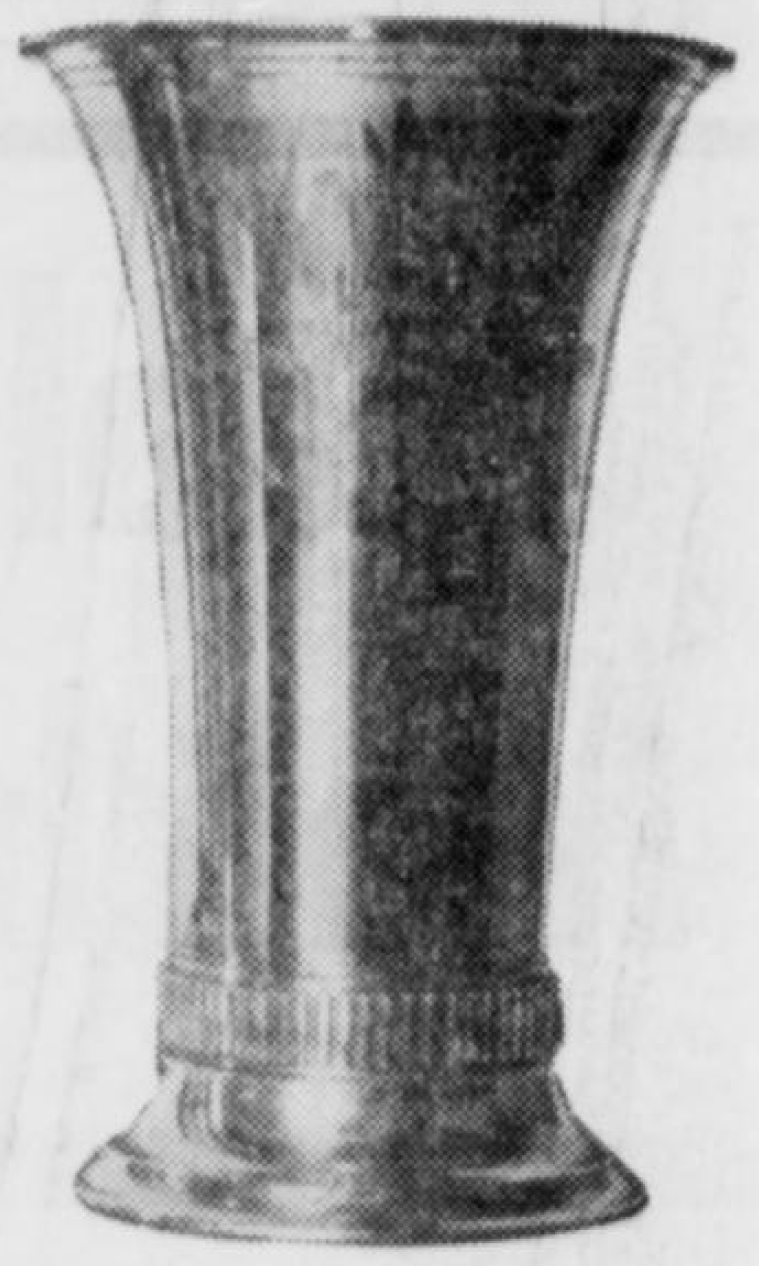
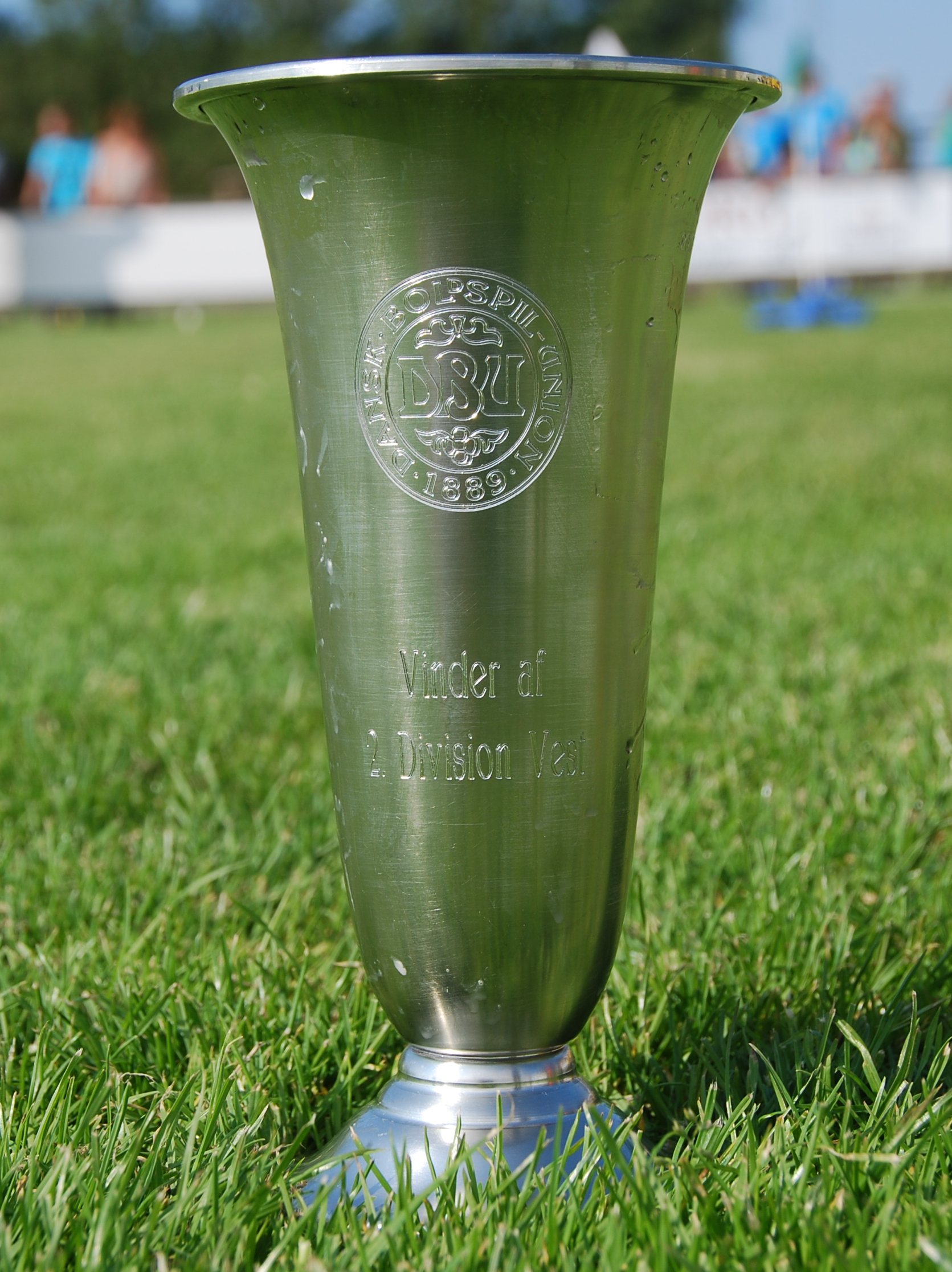
(L–R) The trophies presented to the winners of the third division in the 1964 and 2010–11 (west) seasons.

In 1945, a Danish third level was reintroduced as the bufferzone between the elite teams and the amateur clubs with 10 teams. One team gained promotion to 2nd Division, and one relegated to the club's respective regional football league. In 1951, The 3rd Division was expanded to 12 teams and to teams was relegated to a newly created Kvalifikationsturneringen – the new buffer between the Danmarksturneringen and the regional football leagues. The structure was changed again in 1966. Two geographical groups with 12 teams each were created. Only one team could be promoted and two teams be relegated. The Danish 2nd Division West would for the most part consist of teams from the Jutland FA and Funen FA, while Danish 2nd Division East would consist of teams from the Zealand FA, Copenhagen FA, Lolland-Falster FA and Bornholm FA. In 1975, the number of teams in the league got expanded and the 3rd Division rolled into one row with 16 teams, where two teams could be promoted to the 2nd Division and teams relegated to the Denmark Series.

The Danish top-flight league was renamed in 1991, which included the second-tier being renamed to 1st Division and the third-tier becoming known as the 2nd Division. From 2005, the 2nd Division was changed to have 14 teams each in the East and West pools, with three teams to promote. In addition, access of up to eight reserve teams of the Danish Superliga clubs was allowed in the 2nd Division. The number of teams in the 2nd Division was increased to 16 teams in 2008. In 2010, the reserve teams were removed from the 2nd Division following the foundation of the Danish Reserve League. The 2nd Division did change again in 2015, that reduced the number of teams in the 2nd Division from 32 to 24. 3 pools with each 8 teams was created, where the four top finishers in each pool would be playing for promotion to the 1st Division, with promotion for the two best-placed teams. Also, there would be a relegation pool for the 12 teams that end up as 5–8 in one of their 3 pools, where the 9–12th places relegated to the Denmark Series.

== Clubs ==
=== 2026–27 season ===
Incomplete

Club	#	Since	Total	Superliga	1st Division	Notes
B.93	1	2026		1998–99	2025–26	
Brabrand				—N/a	2009–10	
FA 2000		2026		—N/a		
Fremad Amager				1994–95		
HIK				1939–40		
Middelfart				—N/a		
Nykøbing		2026		1982		As B 1901 in the 1982 1st Division season.
Næstved				1995–96		
Roskilde				—N/a		
Skive				—N/a		
Thisted				—N/a		
VSK Aarhus						

== Winners ==
=== III Series (1936–1940) ===
III Serie West (1936–1940)

Season	Winners	Runners-up	Top scorer(s)		Ref
Season	Winners	Runners-up	Name	Goals	Ref
1936–37	Fredericia BK	Horsens FS			
1937–38	Vejle BK	Holstebro BK	Laurits Andersen (Vejle BK)	13	
1938–39	Vejle BK	Holstebro BK	Charles Knudsen (Vejle BK)	10	
1939–40	Vejle BK^{†}	Holstebro BK	Charles Knudsen (Vejle BK)	13	

- ^{†}: Winners of the season's overall league championship final.

III Serie East (1936–1940)

Season	Winners	Runners-up	Top scorer(s)		Ref
Season	Winners	Runners-up	Name	Goals	Ref
1936–37	KFUM København^{†}	Nakskov BK	Aage Nielsen (KFUM København)	10	
1937–38	Østerbros BK^{†}	Skovshoved IF			
1938–39	Nakskov BK^{†}	Slagelse BK&IF			
1939–40	Korsør BK	Skovshoved IF	Adolf Bechmann (Skovshoved IF)	13	

- ^{†}: Winners of the season's overall league championship final.

=== 3rd Division (1945–1990) ===
3rd Division (1945–1965)

Season	Winners	Runners-up	Top scorer(s)		Ref
Season	Winners	Runners-up	Name	Goals	Ref
1945–46	Odense BK	Odense KFUM	Svend Jørgen Hansen (Odense BK)	28	
1946–47	Brønshøj BK	Næstved IF	Kaj Pettersson (Brønshøj BK)	35	
1947–48	Næstved IF	Odense KFUM	Valdemar Kendzior (Korsør BK); Esben Donnerborg (Næstved IF)	22	
1948–49	Skovshoved IF	Horsens FS	Adolf Bechmann (Skovshoved IF)	20	
1949–50	B 1913	Vejen SF	Ove Dziegel (Nakskov BK)	20	
1950–51	Horsens FS	Hellerup IK	Bent Petersen (Horsens FS)	17	
1951–52	Vejle BK	Odense KFUM	Ernst Petersen (AIA)	21	
1952–53	AIA	Hellerup IK	Ernst Petersen (AIA)	24	
1953–54	Hellerup IK	Helsingør IF	Helge Gravesen (Vanløse IF)	24	
1954–55	Vanløse IF	BK Fremad Amager	Jørgen Larsen (Lendemark BK)	25	
1955–56	Brønshøj BK	B 1901	Ove Andersen (Brønshøj BK)	26	
1956–57	Ikast FS	Frederikshavn fI	Leo D. Nielsen (Ikast FS)	31	
1958	Randers SK Freja	BK Fremad Amager	Ole Madsen (Hellerup IK); Helge Jørgensen (Odense KFUM)	26	
1959	BK Rødovre	BK Frem Sakskøbing	Harald Nielsen (Frederikshavn fI)	19	
1960	Odense KFUM	Hellerup IK	Helge Jørgensen (Odense KFUM)	28	
1961	Viborg FF	Horsens FS	Finn Døssing (Viborg FF)	23	
1962	Vanløse IF	Ikast FS	Adser Skov (Vanløse IF)	21	
1963	Hvidovre IF	Næstved IF	Bjarne Jensen (IK Aalborg Chang)	23	
1964	Holbæk B&IF	AIA	Flemming Jensen (IK Skovbakken)	18	
1965	Vanløse IF	Randers SK Freja	Bjarne Jensen (IK Aalborg Chang)	21	

3rd Division West (1966–1974)

Season	Winners	Runners-up	Top scorer(s)		Ref
Season	Winners	Runners-up	Name	Goals	Ref
1966	Silkeborg IF^{†}	IK Aalborg Chang	Bjarne Jensen (IK Aalborg Chang)	22	
1967	IK Skovbakken^{†}	Frederikshavn fI	Ole Larsen (IK Skovbakken); Preben Plougmann (Stoholm IF); Finn Johansen (Stoholm IF)	17	
1968	Kolding IF^{†}	Frederikshavn fI	Niels Erik KIldemoes (Odense KFUM)	25	
1969	IF Fuglebakken^{†}	Viborg FF	Kristen Nygaard (IF Fuglebakken)	25	
1970	Silkeborg IF	BK Herning Fremad			
1971	Svendborg fB^{†}	Odense KFUM	Heino Hansen (Kalundborg GF&BK); Helge Jørgensen (Odense KFUM)	17	
1972	Aabenraa BK	Frederikshavn fI	Willy Moshage (Aabenraa BK)	23	
1973	Esbjerg fB^{†}	Ikast FS	Kristian Østergaard (Esbjerg fB)	20	
1974	Nakskov BK	Frederikshavn fI	Henning Marxen (Middelfart G&BK)	21	

- ^{†}: Winners of the season's overall league championship final.

3rd Division East (1966–1974)

Season	Winners	Runners-up	Top scorer(s)		Ref
Season	Winners	Runners-up	Name	Goals	Ref
1966	Lyngby BK	KFUM København	Jørgen Jørgensen (Holbæk B&IF)	20	
1967	Slagelse BK&IF	Taastrup IK	Kaj Lykke (Holbæk B&IF)	18	
1968	Holbæk B&IF	BK Fremad Amager	Jørgen Larsen (Lyngby BK)	20	
1969	BK Fremad Amager	Hellerup IK	Peter Kristensen (BK Fremad Amager)	20	
1970	Slagelse BK&IF^{†}	B.93	Jan Højland (B.93); Lau Jensen (Herfølge BK); Peter Johansson (Slagelse BK&IF)	16	
1971	BK Fremad Amager	B.93			
1972	B.93^{†}	Helsingør IF	Bent Andersen (B.93)	20	
1973	Vanløse IF	Helsingør IF	Bjarne Pettersson (Vanløse IF)	23	
1974	Kastrup BK^{†}	Glostrup IC	Lars Francker (Lyngby BK)	18	

- ^{†}: Winners of the season's overall league championship final.

3rd Division (1975–1985)

Season	Winners	Runners-up	Top scorer(s)		Ref
Season	Winners	Runners-up	Name	Goals	Ref
1975	Ikast FS	Herfølge BK	Anders Bjerregaard (Ikast FS)	20	
1976	IK Skovbakken	Helsingør IF	Klaus Granlund (Hellerup IK)	26	
1977	Lyngby BK	Brøndby IF	Klaus Berggreen (Lyngby BK)	22	
1978	Herfølge BK	Roskilde B1906	Jørgen Petersen (Viborg FF)	22	
1979	Kolding IF	Helsingør IF	Morten Svart (Brønshøj BK)	23	
1980	Glostrup IC	OKS	Claus Granlund (Hellerup IK)	21	
1981	BK Avarta	Brønshøj BK	Gunnar Weber (Dragør BK)	27	
1982	Roskilde B1906	Svendborg fB	Henrik Andersen (Hjørring IF)	20	
1983	B 1913	Randers SK Freja	Lars Britz (Slagelse BK&IF)	24	
1984	Aalborg BK	Horsens FS	Warly Jørgensen (Næsby BK)	18	
1985	Greve IF	Vanløse IF	Jan Krause (Vanløse IF)	27	

3rd Division West (1986–1990)

Season	Winners	Runners-up	Top scorer(s)		Ref
Season	Winners	Runners-up	Name	Goals	Ref
1986	Slagelse BK&IF^{†}	OKS			
1987	Horsens FS	OKS	Steen Engby (Horsens FS); Jacob Harder (OKS)	18	
1988	B 1909	Nørresundby BK	Jan Knudsen (B 1909)	19	
1989	Svendborg fB	Greve IF	Jan Nielsen (Greve IF)	19	
1990	Horsens FS	Varde IF			

- ^{†}: Winners of the season's overall league championship final.

3rd Division East (1986–1990)

Season	Winners	Runners-up	Top scorer(s)		Ref
Season	Winners	Runners-up	Name	Goals	Ref
1986	Helsingør IF	BK Fremad Valby	Peter Rasmussen (B 1901)	30	
1987	BK Fremad Amager	BK Avarta	Bernd Dietrich (BK Fremad Amager)	15	
1988	BK Avarta	Holbæk B&IF	Per H. Jensen (Holbæk B&IF)	13	
1989	B.93	Ølstykke FC	Peter Eriksen (Dragør BK)	20	
1990	IF Skjold Birkerød	Akademisk BK	Peter Lassen (Køge BK and Hvidovre IF)	22	

=== 2nd Division (1991–present) ===
2nd Division West (1991–1997)

Season	Winners	Runners-up	Top scorer(s)		Ref
Season	Winners	Runners-up	Name	Goals	Ref
1991	Nørresundby BK	Randers SK Freja	Bo Hansen (Holstebro BK)	17	
1991–92 grundspil	Horsens FS	Esbjerg fB			
1991–92 slutspil (Note: In the summer of 1991, one of the several changes to the format of the Danmarksturneringen i fodbold was the introduction of the Kvalifikationsligaen in the spring section of the season, which meant that the levels below in the overall Danish football league system was dropped by one, while at the same time being increased by one in the autumn season. This tournament format lasted until the spring of 1995.)	Svendborg fB	Akademisk BK	Flemming Christensen (Akademisk BK)	14	
1992–93 grundspil	Ølstykke FC	Horsens FS	Peter Rasmussen (Nørre Aaby IK)	14	
1992–93 slutspil	Holstebro BK	BK Herning Fremad	Peter Rasmussen (Nørre Aaby IK)	12	
1993–94 grundspil	BK Herning Fremad	Holstebro BK	Per Andersen (Holstebro BK)	18	
1993–94 slutspil	Haderslev FK	IK Aalborg Chang	Kim Michelsen (IF Skjold Birkerød)	15	
1994–95 grundspil	BK Herning Fremad	Svendborg fB	Ole Pedersen (Svendborg fB)	15	
1994–95 slutspil	Nørre Aaby IK	B 1909	Peter Rasmussen (Nørre Aaby IK)	14	
1995–96 fall	Aarhus Fremad	Nørresundby BK	Søren Hermansen (Aarhus Fremad)	18	
1995–96 spring	Aarhus Fremad	Haderslev FK	Søren Hermansen (Aarhus Fremad)	15	
1996–97 fall	AC Horsens	Vejen SF	Michael Steffensen (Vejen SF)	16	
1996–97 spring	IK Aalborg Chang	AC Horsens	Bo Nielsen (IK Aalborg Chang)	15	

2nd Division East (1991–1997)

Season	Winners	Runners-up	Top scorer(s)		Ref
Season	Winners	Runners-up	Name	Goals	Ref
1991	Hellerup IK	BK Fremad Amager	Kim Michelsen (IF Skjold Birkerød)	13	
1991–92 grundspil	BK Fremad Amager	Helsingør IF			
1991–92 slutspil	B.93	Ølstykke FC	Michael Bo Nielsen (BK Avarta	9	
1992–93 grundspil	B.93	Herfølge BK	Carsten Hansen (Herfølge BK)	14	
1992–93 slutspil	Akademisk BK	Hvidovre IF	Finn Buchardt (Akademisk BK)	17	
1993–94 grundspil	B.93	Hvidovre IF	Jan Krause (Vanløse IF)	12	
1993–94 slutspil	Hellerup IK	Køge BK	Morten Topp (Hellerup IK)	18	
1994–95 grundspil	Esbjerg fB	Køge BK	Jon Dahl Tomasson (Køge BK)	18	
1994–95 slutspil	BK Avarta	Hellerup IK	Thomas Eriksen (Hellerup IK)	10	
1995–96 fall	Roskilde B1906	IF Skjold Birkerød	Thomas Jensen (Roskilde B1906)	19	
1995–96 spring	Roskilde B1906	IF 32 Glostrup	Thomas Rasmussen (IF 32 Glostrup)	15	
1996–97 fall	Hellerup IK	B 1909	Peter Rasmussen (B 1909)	19	
1996–97 spring	BK Frem	B 1913	Jacob Harder (B 1913)	11	

2nd Division (1997–2005)

Season	Winners	Runners-up	Top scorer(s)		Ref
Season	Winners	Runners-up	Name	Goals	Ref
1997–98	B 1909	Holstebro BK	Peter Rasmussen (B 1909)	28	
1998–99	Randers SK Freja	FC Fredericia	Søren Borup (Skive IK)	29	
1999–2000	B 1913	Skive IK	Michael Steffensen (Vejen SF)	23	
2000–01	Kolding IF	FC Fredericia	Mikkel Lindorff (FC Fredericia)	24	
2001–02	BK Skjold	Ølstykke FC	Anders Jochumsen (BK Skjold)	22	
2002–03	FC Nordjylland	Nykøbing Falster Alliancen	Glenn Gundersen (FC Nordjylland)	26	
2003–04	Hellerup IK	Dalum IF	Karsten Jensen (Næstved BK)	27	
2004–05	Kolding FC	Brabrand IF	Morten Nordstrand (Lyngby BK)	22	

2nd Division West (2005–2015)

Season	Winners	Runners-up	Top scorer(s)		Ref
Season	Winners	Runners-up	Name	Goals	Ref
2005–06	Esbjerg fB (II)	Aarhus Fremad	Thomas Buus Nielsen (Jetsmark IF)	20	
2006–07	Skive IK	Ikast FS (FCM II)	Jesper Kjærulff (FC Fyn)	19	
2007–08	Thisted FC	Brabrand IF	Martin Hansen (Brabrand IF); Ronnie Schwartz Nielsen (Aalborg BK II)	15	
2008–09	FC Fyn	Odense BK	Jesper Thorsted Rasmussen (FC Svendborg)	20	
2009–10	FC Hjørring	Hobro IK	Danilo Arrieta (Hobro IK)	28	
2010–11	Blokhus FC	Aarhus Fremad	Nikolaj Thomsen (Blokhus FC)	25	
2011–12	FC Fyn	Næsby BK	Anders K. Jacobsen (Næsby BK)	26	
2012–13	BK Marienlyst	Aarhus Fremad	Peter Raask Jensen (Aarhus Fremad)	20	
2013–14	Skive IK	Hellerup IK	Anders Hostrup (Skive IK)	24	
2014–15	Næstved BK	BK Marienlyst			

2nd Division East (2005–2015)

Season	Winners	Runners-up	Top scorer(s)		Ref
Season	Winners	Runners-up	Name	Goals	Ref
2005–06	Næstved BK	Holbæk B&IF	Karsten Jensen (Næstved BK)	22	
2006–07	Lolland-Falster Alliancen	Brøndby IF (II)	Henrik Lyngsø Graham Olsen (B.93)	21	
2007–08	FC Roskilde	BK Fremad Amager	Jeppe Kjær (FC Roskilde)	20	
2008–09	FC Vestsjælland	B.93	Thomas Wagner (Stenløse BK)	23	
2009–10	Brønshøj BK	B.93	Niels Peter Kjølbye (BK Avarta)	20	
2010–11	Nordvest FC	Elite 3000, Helsingør	Morten Seifert (BK Avarta)	18	
2011–12	Hellerup IK	Hvidovre IF	Anders Kaagh (Herlev IF)	22	
2012–13	Hvidovre IF	FC Helsingør	Jonathan Nielsen (FC Helsingør)	22	
2013–14	FC Roskilde	Næstved BK	Emil Nielsen (FC Roskilde)	34	
2014–15	FC Helsingør	BK Frem			

2nd Division, Promotion Group (2015–2020)

Season	Winners	Runners-up	Top scorer(s)		Ref
Season	Winners	Runners-up	Name	Goals	Ref
2015–16	AB Gladsaxe	BK Fremad Amager			
2016–17	Thisted FC	Brabrand IF			
2017–18	Hvidovre IF	Næstved BK			
2018–19	Skive IK	Kolding IF			
2019–20	FC Helsingør	Aarhus Fremad	Christian Nissen (Aarhus Fremad); Jeppe Kjær (FC Helsingør)	19	

2nd Division West (2020–2021)

Season	Winners	Runners-up	Top scorer(s)		Ref
Season	Winners	Runners-up	Name	Goals	Ref
2020–21	Jammerbugt FC	B.93	Søren Andreasen (Aarhus Fremad)	17	

2nd Division East (2020–2021)

Season	Winners	Runners-up	Top scorer(s)		Ref
Season	Winners	Runners-up	Name	Goals	Ref
2020–21	Nykøbing FC	HIK	Mathias Kristensen (Nykøbing FC)	18	

2nd Division (2021–present)

Season	Winners	Runners-up	Top scorer(s)		Ref
Season	Winners	Runners-up	Name	Goals	Ref
2021–22	Næstved	Hillerød Fodbold	Mileta Rajović (Næstved)	18	
2022–23	Kolding IF	B.93	Frederik Ellegaard (AB)	18	
2023–24	Esbjerg fB	FC Roskilde	Elias Sørensen (Esbjerg fB)	24	
2024–25	Aarhus Fremad	Middelfart BK	Noah Engell (AB)	16	
2025–26	AB	Vendsyssel	Donavan Bagou (HIK)	19	
2026–27					

== Sponsors and logos ==
In 2011, it was announced that for the first time, the third-tier would be given its own logo, taking effect at the start of the 2011–12 season. The league changed its official name to Kanal Sport Divisionen for the 2015–16 season, when the naming rights were acquired by the Danish sports TV-channel Kanal Sport. In June 2025, Soft2Bet, the operator of CampoBet and Betinia, chose to become the title sponsor of the second, third, and fourth divisions starting from the 2025/26 season and for at least two seasons.

Former and current logos for the 2nd Division.

2. division
(2011–12 until 2014–15 and 2016–17 until 2024–25)
No league sponsor

Kanal Sport Divisionen
(2015–16 season)
Sponsor: Kanal Sport

CampoBet 2. Division
(since 2025–26)
Sponsor: Soft2Bet
