= Football in Denmark =

- Country: Denmark
- Governing body: Danish Football Association
- National teams: Men's national team, Women's national team
- First played: 1876; 150 years ago

National competitions
- FIFA World Cup; FIFA Women's World Cup; UEFA European Championship; UEFA Women's Championship; UEFA Nations League; UEFA Women's Nations League

Club competitions
- League: Superligaen; Danish 1st Division; Danish 2nd Division; Danish 3rd Division; A-Liga (danish women's league); B-Liga; Cups: Danish Cup; Danish Women's Cup; Danish Super Cup

International competitions
- FIFA Club World Cup; FIFA Intercontinental Cup; UEFA Champions League; UEFA Women's Champions League; UEFA Europa League; UEFA Women's Europa Cup; UEFA Conference League; UEFA Super Cup

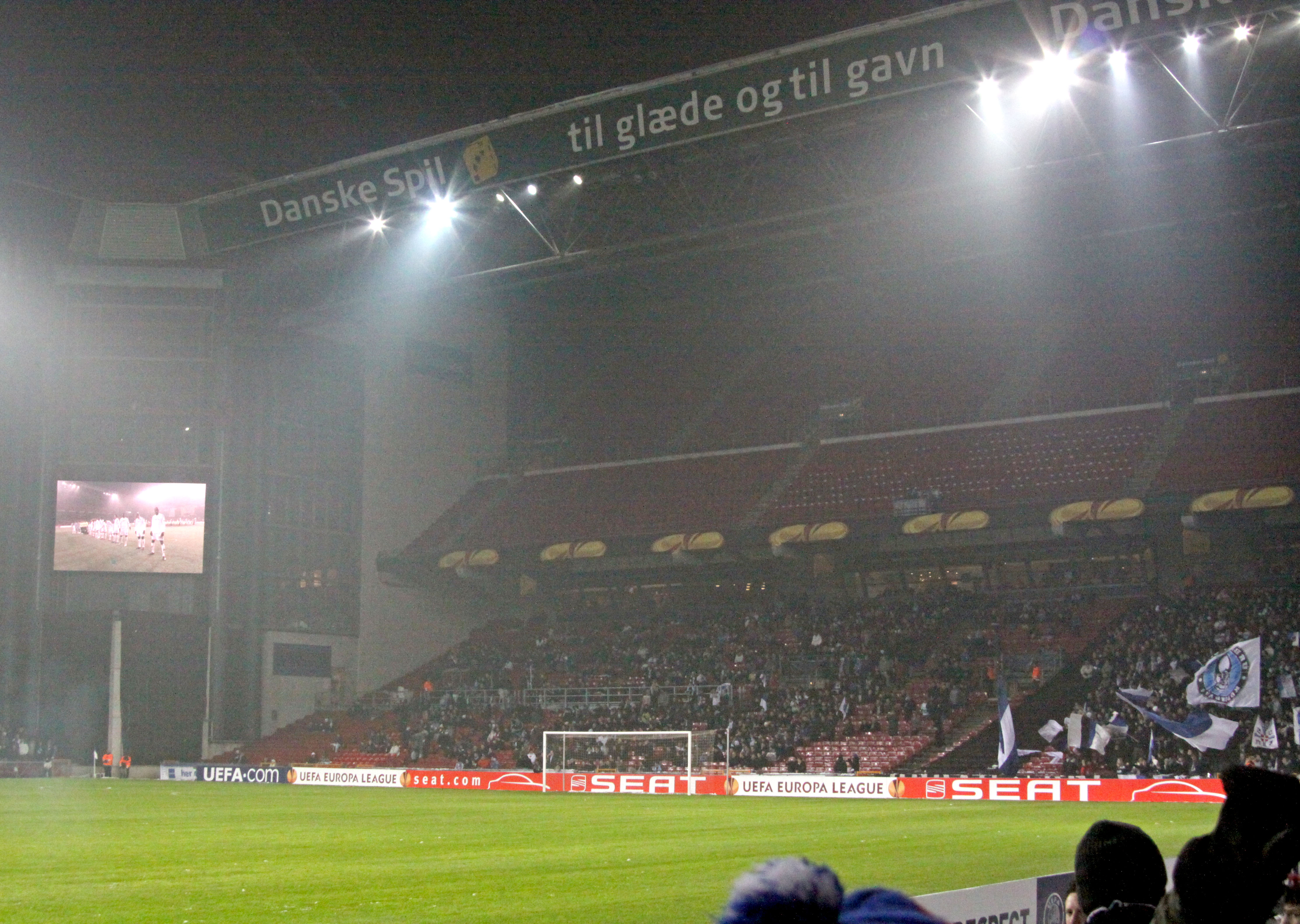
Parken is the largest football stadium by capacity in Denmark.

Association football (Danish: fodbold) is the most popular sport in Denmark, with 331,693 players and 1,647 clubs registered (as of 2016) under the Danish FA. Over half of the people in Denmark are interested in football.

Football was introduced into Denmark by British sailors. Kjøbenhavns Boldklub is the oldest club outside of the United Kingdom, having been founded on 26 April 1876.

Denmark hosted the 1984 European Competition for Women's Football, the 1991 UEFA Women's Euro, the 1994 European Cup Winners' Cup final, the 2000 UEFA Cup Final, the 2003 UEFA Women's Cup Final, as well as three group stage matches and a round of 16 match of the UEFA Euro 2020.

== Men's league system ==
The Copenhagen Football Championship, known as Fodboldturneringen, was established in 1889 as the first domestic league by the Danish Football Association (DBU). Since its founding, many other regional leagues was founded in Denmark. A national league championship was first established in 1927 with the first season being held as 1927–28 Danmarksmesterskabsturneringen. The different leagues was linked together to create a pyramidal structure allowing promotion and relegation between different levels.

The top four levels in Denmark are governed by the Danish Football Association and, the first three divisions by its professional body Divisionsforeningen. The top 3 are collectively called Danmarksturneringen i fodbold (literally: the Denmark Tournament in Football), and share a common set of rules more geared towards professional football. Reserve teams are allowed in the league structure, but can only reach the Denmark Series. The Danish Superliga clubs' reserve teams, primarily, have their own reserve competition.

The lower divisions are controlled by the six regional associations. The number of divisions in the lower series under the auspices of the local football association vary greatly depending on the association's size.

== Competition records ==
=== UEFA Champions League ===
The following team has advanced to the knockout phase of the UEFA Champions League.

- Round of 16: FC Copenhagen (2010–11, 2023–24)

The following teams have advanced to the group stage of the UEFA Champions League.

- Group stage: Aalborg BK (1995–96, 2008–09), Brøndby IF (1998–99), FC Copenhagen (2006–07, 2013–14, 2016–17, 2022-23, 2023-24, 2025-26), FC Nordsjælland (2012–13), FC Midtjylland (2020–21)

=== UEFA Cup/Europa League ===
The following teams have advanced to the knockout phase of the UEFA Cup (now Europa League).

- Semi-finals: Brøndby IF (1990–91)
- Quarter-finals: Boldklubben 1903 (1991–92), Odense BK (1994–95), Brøndby IF (1996–97), FC Copenhagen (2019–20)
- Round of 16: Aalborg BK (2008–09), FC Midtjylland (2025-26)
- Round of 32: Esbjerg fB (2013–14)
- Knockout Round Playoffs: FC Midtjylland (2024–25)

=== UEFA Conference League ===
The following teams have advanced to the knockout phase of the UEFA Conference League.

- Round of 16: FC Copenhagen (2021–22, 2024–25)
- Knockout round play-offs: FC Midtjylland (2021–22), Randers (2021–22)

=== Defunct ===
==== European Cup ====
The following teams have advanced to the knockout phase of the European Cup.

- Quarter-finals: AGF Aarhus (1960–61), Brøndby IF (1986–87)

==== UEFA Cup Winners' Cup ====
The following teams have advanced to the knockout phase of the UEFA Cup Winners' Cup.

- Quarter-finals: B1909 (1962–63), Randers Freja (1968–69), Vejle BK (1977–78), AGF Aarhus (1988–89)

== See also ==
- List of football clubs in Denmark
- List of football stadiums in Denmark
- Roligan
