= 2016–17 Danish Cup =

DBU Pokalen (The DBU Cup)

Tournament details
- Country: Denmark
- Teams: 108

Final positions
- Champions: Copenhagen
- Runners-up: Brøndby
- UEFA Europa League: Brøndby

Tournament statistics
- Matches played: 106

The 2016–17 Danish Cup was the 63rd season of the Danish Cup competition. Copenhagen won the tournament, earning qualification into the second qualifying round of the 2017–18 UEFA Europa League. However, as Copenhagen also won the 2016–17 Danish Superliga, Brøndby, the cup runners-up, were allotted the position.

== Structure ==
In the first round, there were 96 teams. 61 coming from the qualifiers among series teams in season 2016-17 with DBU Bornholm (1 team), DBU Fyn (10 teams), DBU Jutland (21 teams) DBU Copenhagen (11 teams), DBU Lolland-Falster (4 teams) and DBU Zealand (14 teams). An additional 23 teams come from the 2015-16 Danish 2nd Divisions and 10 teams from the 2015-16 Danish 1st Division. The last two teams were the bottom two from the 2015-16 Danish Superliga.

In the second round, there were 56 teams. 48 of them are winners from the first round with 6 teams from the 2015-16 Danish Superliga. The last teams were the top two from the 2015-16 Danish 1st Division.

In the third round, there will be 32 teams. 28 are winners from the second round. The last teams are the top four from the 2015-16 Danish Superliga.

The remainder of the competition will be in a "knockout" format.

== Participants ==
107 teams are part of DBU Pokalen. All division team from the season 2015-16 is automatically Cup while enrolled seriehold played qualifying matches to come. FC Vestsjælland did not participate in the cup following a bankruptcy declaration.

=== 2016-17 Danish Superliga ===
Club	Entered in	Eliminated in	Eliminated by
AaB	2nd Round	Quarterfinals	FC Midtjylland
AC Horsens	1st Round	4th Round	AGF
AGF	2nd Round	Quarterfinals	F.C. Copenhagen
Brøndby	3rd Round	Final	F.C. Copenhagen
Esbjerg fB	1st Round	3rd Round	B93
FC København	3rd Round	Champion	
FC Midtjylland	3rd Round	Semifinals	Brøndby
FC Nordsjælland	2nd Round	3rd Round	Næstved BK
Lyngby BK	2nd Round	3rd Round	Kjellerup IF
OB	2nd Round	3rd Round	Vendsyssel FF
Randers FC	2nd Round	Quarterfinals	Brøndby
Silkeborg	2nd Round	4th Round	AaB
SønderjyskE	3rd Round	4th Round	Randers FC
Viborg FF	2nd Round	3rd Round	HB Køge

=== 2016-17 bet25 Liga ===
Club	Entered in	Eliminated in	Eliminated by
AB Gladsaxe	1st Round	3rd Round	BK Marienlyst
FC Fredericia	1st Round	3rd Round	FC Roskilde
FC Helsingør	1st Round	3rd Round	AC Horsens
FC Roskilde	1st Round	4th Round	Næstved BK
Fremad Amager	1st Round	3rd Round	FC Midtjylland
HB Køge	1st Round	4th Round	Vendsyssel FF
Hobro IK	1st Round	2nd Round	Vendsyssel FF
Nykøbing FC	1st Round	2nd round	Næstved BK
Næstved BK	1st Round	Quarterfinals	Vendsyssel FF
Skive IK	1st Round	3rd Round	Silkeborg IF
Vejle BK	1st Round	2nd Round	OB
Vendsyssel FF	1st Round	Semifinals	F.C. Copenhagen

=== 2016–17 Danish 2nd Divisions ===
Club	2016-17 League	Entered in	Eliminated in	Eliminated by
BK Avarta	Group 1	1st Round	1st Round	Fremad Amager
B93	Group 1	1st Round	4th Round	F.C. Copenhagen
Brabrand IF	Group 3	1st Round	2nd Round	FC Fredericia
Brønshøj BK	Group 1	1st Round	1st Round	Frederiksværk
Dalum IF	Group 2	1st Round	2nd Round	Holbæk B&I
FC Svendborg	Group 2	1st Round	1st Round	FC Fredericia
Fredensborg BI	Group 1	1st Round	2nd Round	FC Helsingør
BK Frem	Group 1	1st Round	3rd Round	Brøndby IF
HIK	Group 1	1st Round	3rd Round	Randers FC
Holbæk B&I	Group 1	1st Round	3rd Round	AGF
Hvidovre IF	Group 1	1st Round	3rd Round	SønderjyskE
Jammerbugt FC	Group 3	1st Round	3rd Round	F.C. Copenhagen
Kjellerup IF	Group 3	1st Round	4th Round	FC Midtjylland
Kolding IF	Group 2	1st Round	2nd Round	VSK Aarhus
BK Marienlyst	Group 2	1st Round	4th Round	Brøndby IF
Middelfart	Group 2	1st Round	1st Round	Esbjerg fB
Næsby BK	Group 2	1st Round	1st Round	OKS
Odder IGF	Group 3	1st Round	2nd Round	Kjellerup IF
Thisted FC	Group 3	1st Round	1st Round	Aalborg Freja
VSK Aarhus	Group 3	1st Round	3rd Round	AaB
Aarhus Fremad	Group 3	1st Round	1st Round	VSK Aarhus

=== DBU Bornholm ===
Club	2017-18 League	Entered in	Eliminated in	Eliminated by
NB Bornholm	Copenhagen Series	1st Round	2nd Round	BK Frem

=== DBU Funen ===
Club	2016-17 League	Entered in	Eliminated in	Eliminated by
B1909	Albani Series	1st Round	2nd Round	Skive IK
B1913	Denmark Series	1st Round	1st Round	Kolding IF
Flemløse/Hårby	Funen Series 1	1st Round	2nd Round	Esbjerg fB
Marstal/Rise	Albani Series	1st Round	1st Round	Varde IF
Morud IF	Albani Series	1st Round	1st Round	Otterup B&IK
Nørre Aaby IK	Funen Series 1	1st Round	1st Round	Dalum IF
OKS	Albani Series	1st Round	2nd Round	Viborg FF
Otterup B&IK	Albani Series	1st Round	2nd Round	Hvidovre IF
Aarslev BK	Albani Series	1st Round	1st Round	BK Marienlyst

=== DBU Jutland ===
Club	2016-17 League	Entered in	Eliminated in	Eliminated by
Birkelse IF	Jutland Series	1st Round	1st Round	Vendsyssel FF
Brædstrup	Jutland Series	1st Round	1st Round	Lystrup IF
Christiansbjerg IF	Jutland Series 1	1st Round	1st Round	Kjellerup IF
FC Skanderborg	Denmark Series	1st Round	1st Round	Aabyhøj IF
FC Sønderborg	Denmark Series	1st Round	1st Round	b1909
Holstebro BK	Denmark Series	1st Round	1st Round	Lyseng IF
IF Skjold Sæby	Denmark Series	1st Round	1st Round	Nørresundby BK
IF Lyseng	Denmark Series	1st Round	2nd Round	AC Horsens
Lystrup IF	Denmark Series	1st Round	2nd Round	Randers FC
Løgstør IF	Jutland Series	1st Round	1st Round	Skive IK
NUBI	Jutland Series 2	1st Round	1st Round	Jammerbugt FC
Nørresundby BK	Jutland Series	1st Round	2nd Round	AaB
Ringkøbing IF	Denmark Series	1st Round	1st Round	Hobro IK
Silkeborg KFUM	Jutland Series 1	1st Round	1st Round	Brabrand IF
Sædding/Guldager IF	Jutland Series	1st Round	1st Round	Flemløse/Hårby
Tarm IF	Jutland Series 1	1st Round	1st Round	AC Horsens
Tjæreborg IF	Jutland Series 1	1st Round	1st Round	Vejle BK
Varde IF	Denmark Series	1st Round	2nd Round	Jammerbugt FC
Vatanspor	Denmark Series	1st Round	1st Round	Odder IGF
Aabyhøj IF	Jutland Series	1st Round	2nd Round	Silkeborg IF
Aalborg Freja	Jutland Series	1st Round	2nd Round	AGF

=== DBU Copenhagen ===
Club	2016-17 League	Entered in	Eliminated in	Eliminated by
AB Tårnby	Denmark Series	1st Round	1st Round	B93
B1908	Denmark Series	1st Round	2nd Round	BK Marienlyst
CSC	Copenhagen Series 1	1st Round	1st Round	FC Helsingør
FC Græsrødderne	Copenhagen Series 3	1st Round	1st Round	AB Gladsaxe
Fremad Valby	Denmark Series	1st Round	1st Round	Tårnby FF
GVI	Denmark Series	1st Round	1st Round	HIK
IF Føroyar	Copenhagen Series 1	1st Round	1st Round	VB 1968
Jaegersborg BK	Denmark Series	1st Round	1st Round	IF Skjold Birkerød
Skovshoved IF	Denmark Series	1st Round	2nd Round	FC Roskilde
Tårnby FF	Copenhagen Series	1st Round	2nd Round	FC Nordsjælland
Vanløse IF	Denmark Series	1st Round	1st Round	BK Frem

=== DBU Lolland-Falster ===
Club	2016-17 League	Entered in	Eliminated in	Eliminated by
Døllefjelde-Musse IF	Zealand Series	1st Round	2nd Round	HB Køge
FC Nakskov	Lolland-Falster Series	1st Round	1st Round	Holbæk B&I
Horslunde	Lolland-Falster Series	1st Round	1st Round	Døllefjelde-Musse IF
Maribo BK	Lolland-Falster Series	1st Round	1st Round	FC Roskilde

=== DBU Zealand ===
Club	2016-17 League	Entered in	Eliminated in	Eliminated by
Avedøre IF	Denmark Series	1st Round	1st Round	B1908
BSF	Zealand Series	1st Round	1st Round	Skovshoved IF
Frederiksværk FK	Zealand Series 2	1st Round	2nd Round	Lyngby BK
Herlev IF	Denmark Series	1st Round	1st Round	Hvidovre IF
Herlufsholm	Denmark Series	1st Round	1st Round	Nykøbing FC
IF Skjold Birkerød	Zealand Series	1st Round	2nd Round	HIK
Jyderup BK	Zealand Series 2	1st Round	1st Round	KFUM Roskilde
Karlslunde IF	Denmark Series	1st Round	1st Round	HB Køge
KFUM Roskilde	Denmark Series	1st Round	2nd Round	B93
Ledøje-Smørum	Denmark Series	1st Round	2nd Round	AB Gladsaxe
Måløv BK	Zealand Series 2	1st Round	1st Round	Fredensborg BI
Rosenhøj IF	Zealand Series 2	1st Round	1st Round	Ledøje-Smørum
Taastrup FC	Denmark Series	1st Round	1st Round	NB Bornholm
VB 1968	Zealand Series 1	1st Round	2nd Round	Fremad Amager

== First round ==
In the first round of the DBU Cup, the 94 teams are divided into a Western and Eastern Pool. The West Pool featured 50 teams, divided into three separate pools (North, Central and South/Funen Pool). The Eastern Pool of 44 teams was divided into two pools (Zealand/Lolland/Falster Pool and Zealand/Copenhagen/Bornholm Pool).

The First Round draw took place on Friday, 23 June 2016.

=== West, Northern Pool ===
9 August 2016	IF Mills Chain (4)	0–3	Nørresundby (5)	Sparekassen Vendsyssel Arena, Sæby
18:30		Report	Stokholm 32'; Knudsen 57'; Vinstrup Svendsen 75'	Referee: Patrick Remon Andersen

9 August 2016	Nubi (7)	4–5 (a.e.t.)	Jammerbugt FC (3)	Nubi's Stadium, Nørresundby
18:30	Rødhus 1'; Borregaard Carlsen 69'; Christensen 89'; Martin Sørensen 116'	Report	Okello 18'; Studsgaard Knudsen 20'; Rafael 76', 112'; Larsen 100'	Referee: Henrik Overgaard

9 August 2016	Aalborg Freja (5)	1–1 (a.e.t.) (4–3 p)	Thisted FC (3)	Freja Park, Aalborg
18:30	Jensen 42' (pen.)	Report	Jakobsen 31'	Referee: Chris Johansen

10 August 2016	Birkelse (5)	0–9	Vendsyssel FF (2)	JL Cars Arena, Aabybro
18:30		Report	Brandão 7', 28'; Opondo 8', 50'; Leonco 30' (pen.); Bøgild 67'; Sørensen 76'	Referee: Tinna High Christensen

10 August 2016	Løgstør (5)	0–4	Skive IK (2)	Løgstør Stadion, Løgstør
18:30		Report	Bjerregaard 28'; Lykke Eriksen 50', 90'; Pedersen 70'	Referee: Michael V. Jensen

=== West, Central Pool ===
9 August 2016	Silkeborg KFUM (6)	2–6	Brabrand IF (3)	Søholt Sports Park, Silkeborg
18:30	Bjerregaard Andersen 4'; Pedersen 71'	Report	Peipinen 24'; Kaljo 44', 70'; Hajdarević 48'; Özturk 73'; Rosenberg 82'	Referee: Jens Maae

9 August 2016	Vatanspor (4)	1–5	Odder IGF (3)	Sødalskolen, Braabrand
18:30	Ceylan 75'	Report	Bresløv Larsen 25', 30'; Brink Rasmussen 50'; Mikkelsen 61'; Skibsted 86'	Referee: Morten Krogh

9 August 2016	Aarhus Fremad (3)	1–1 (a.e.t.) (4–5 p)	VSK Aarhus (3)	Riisvangen Stadion, Aarhus
18:30	Valentin 25'	Report	Scott Carl 61'	Referee: Jakob Kehlet

9 August 2016	Ringkøbing IF (4)	0–2	Hobro IK (2)	Green Arena, Ringkøbing
18:30		Report	Andersen 31'; Domoraud 76'	Referee: Michael Tykgaard

9 August 2016	Holstebro BK (4)	3–5 (a.e.t.)	Lyseng (4)	Holstebro Idrætspark, Holstebro
19:00	Richardt Mortensen 47'; Damkjær 76'; Krarup Petersen 90'	Report	Stokvad 70'; Kolling 73', 77'; Brochstedt Pedersen 111', 116'	Referee: Mathias Kræmer

10 August 2016	Brædstrup (5)	0–3	Lystrup IF (4)	Brædstrup Stadion, Brædstrup
18:30		Report	Rohde 43'; Christensen 63'; Sørensen 75'	Referee: Bjarke Bruun

10 August 2016	Christiansbjerg (6)	0–9	Kjellerup IF (3)	CIF's Stadium, Aarhus
18:30		Report	Stjernholm Pedersen 9' (o.g.); Nielsen 21', 59'; Svendsen 26'; Dahl 41', 56', 58'; Lind 77'; Gertsen 86'	Referee: Allan Staal

10 August 2016	Tarm IF (6)	1–3	AC Horsens (1)	Tarm Stadium, Tarm
18:30	Kristensen 79'	Report	Finnbogason 5', 24'; Gemmer 56'	Referee: Jørgen Daugbjerg Burchardt

10 August 2016	Aabyhøj IF (5)	2–0	FC Skanderborg (4)	Aabyhøj Stadion, Aabyhøj
18:30	Aharonian 49'; Lindhard Jensen 64'	Report		Referee: Mikkel Redder

=== West, Southern/Funen Pool ===
9 August 2016	B1913 (4)	0–4	Kolding IF (3)	Campus Road, Odense
18:30		Report	Nautrup 10', 84'; Jepsen 37'; Reinert Petersen 54'	Referee: Morten Bertelsen

9 August 2016	Morud IF (5)	3–5 (a.e.t.)	Otterup B&IK (5)	Plumbing Fyn Arena, Morud
18:30	Zygmunt Feddersen; Thomsen; Kaspersen	Report	Høstrup; Egdal Davidsen; Roed Andersen; Gjettermann	Referee: Midhat Sulejmanovic

9 August 2016	Nørre Aaby IK (6)	1–6	Dalum IF (3)	Nørre Aaby Sports Park, Nørre Aaby
18:30	Hauge Mortensen 63'	Report	Corfitzen 11'; Holm Christensen 49', 53'; Hansen 56', 59'; Michael Nielsen 77' (pen.)	Referee: Paw Johansen

9 August 2016	OKS (5)	2–1	Næsby BK (3)	OKSON-Park, Odense
18:30	Cappelen 72', 75' (pen.)	Report	Lagoni 82'	Referee: Martin Outzen

9 August 2016	Aarslev BK (5)	0–2	BK Marienlyst (3)	Netplan Arena, Aarslev
18:30		Report	Krøll Rasmussen 20'; Petersen 65'	Referee: Søren Stagaard

10 August 2016	B1909 (5)	1–0	FC Sønderborg (4)	Gillestad Park, Odense
18:30	Munk 76' (pen.)	Report		Referee: Allan Rørdahl Borgstrøm

10 August 2016	FC Svendborg (3)	1–4	FC Fredericia (2)	Høje Bøge Stadion, Svendborg
18:30	Høgstad 39'	Report	Jacobsen 37'; Feldballe 76' (pen.); Knudsen 89'; Dhi Putros 90' (pen.)	Referee: Peter Rasmussen

10 August 2016	Flemløse/Hårby (6)	2–1 (a.e.t.)	Saedding/Guldager IF (5)	Hårby Stadium, Haarby
18:30	Jensen 90'; Hansen 101'	Report	Knudsen 47'	Referee: Midhat Sulejmanovic

10 August 2016	Varde IF (4)	1–0	Marstal/Rise (5)	Sydbank Stadium, Varde
18:30	Holm	Report		Referee: Henrik Hansen

11 August 2016	Middelfart G&BK (3)	0–1	Esbjerg fB (1)	Middelfart Stadion, Middelfart
18:30		Report	Lund 4'	Referee: Mads-Kristoffer Kristoffersen

16 August 2016	Prudhoe (6)	1–3	Vejle BK (2)	Blue Water Arena, Esbjerg
18:15	Jensen 20'	Report	Alvarez 6'; School 43'; Elgaard 63'	Referee: Morten Krogh

=== East, Zealand/Lolland/Falster Pool ===
9 August 2016	FC Nakskov (6)	0–5	Holbæk B&I (3)	OK+ Stadion, Nakskov
18:30		Report	Billeskov 26'; Sjørslev 30', 59'; Serinkanli 61' (pen.); Rasmussen 90' (o.g.)	Referee: Kenneth Sørensen

9 August 2016	Horslunde (6)	2–3	Døllefjelde Musse IF (5)	Horslunde Stadion, Horslunde
18:30	Andersen 32'; Dara 60'	Report	Andreasen 2'; Latocha 20'; Knudsen 87'	Referee: Martin Køster

9 August 2016	Jyderup (7)	1–7	KFUM Roskilde (4)	Jyderup Stadion, Jyderup
18:30	Eriksen 7'	Report	Olsen 25', 77' (pen.); Nagel 35'; Juhl 65', 81'; Andersen 68', 88'	Referee: Nicolai Mossing Madsen

10 August 2016	Karlslunde IF (4)	0–2	HB Køge (2)	Karlslunde Stadion, Karlslunde
18:30		Report	Ghani 90' (o.g.); Andersen 90'	Referee: Jesper Nielsen

10 August 2016	Maribo (6)	0–4	FC Roskilde (2)	MB's Stadion, Maribo
18:30		Report	Buch 12', 66'; Andersen 15', 36'	Referee: Jakob A. Sundberg

16 August 2016	Herlufsholm (4)	0–4	Nykøbing FC (2)	Herlufsholm Stadion, Næstved
18:15		Report	Bertelsen 37'; Bonde 40'; Kaalund 53'; Berner 78'	Referee: Kasper Madsen

=== East, Zealand/Copenhagen/Bornholm Pool ===
9 August 2016	NB Bornholm (5)	2–1	Taastrup FC (4)	Nexø Stadion, Nexø
17:00	Stukonis 64'; Andersen 79'	Report	Soelberg 74' (o.g.)	Referee: Danny V. Nielsen

9 August 2016	Frederiksværk (7)	1–0	Brønshøj BK (3)	Frederiksværk Stadion, Frederiksværk
18:30	Borre 6'	Report		Referee: Skjødt Petersen

9 August 2016	IF Føroyar (6)	1–2 (a.e.t.)	VB 1968 (6)	Kløvermarken, Copenhagen
18:30	Høgni Jacobsen 11'	Report	Samir El-Khatib 82'; Nielsen 106'	Referee: Benjamin Leander

9 August 2016	IF Skjold Birkerød (5)	2–0	Jægersborg BK (4)	Birkerød Stadion, Birkerød
18:30	Garly Hansen 5'; Madsen 86'	Report		Referee: Lars Christoffersen

9 August 2016	Måløv BK (7)	0–6	Fredensborg BI (3)	Måløv Idrætspark, Måløv
18:30		Report	Schmidt 6'; Smith 31', 84'; Falck 33'; Frederiksen 74'; Brøndberg 80'	Referee: Jakob A. Sundberg

9 August 2016	Rosenhøj BK (7)	1–3	Ledøje-Smørum Fodbold (4)	Sønderkærskolen, Hvidovre
18:30	Pedersen 64'	Report	Scott Rasmussen 48'; M. Lind Jørgensen 63'; D. Lind Jørgensen 90'	Referee: Thomas Dahl Strandberg

9 August 2016	Tårnby FF (5)	3–2	Fremad Valby (4)	Vestamager Idrætsanlæg, Tårnby
18:30	Bernburg 18'; Sandby Knudsen 36', 83'	Report	Thomsen 48'; Jørgensen 88'	Referee: Casper Thorsøe Jr.

9 August 2016	Vanløse IF (4)	3–4	BK Frem (3)	Vanløse Idrætspark, Vanløse
18:30	Carlsen 80'; Stokholm 81' (o.g.); Fakhri Al-Naser 90'	Report	Holm 25'; Antonsson 53', 56'; Elly Pedersen 64'	Referee: Peter Kjærsgaard

10 August 2016	Avedøre IF (4)	1–3	B.1908 (4)	Avedøre Stadion, Hvidovre
18:30	Boe Nielsen 90'	Report	Brockdorff 16'; Larsen 12' (pen.)	Referee: Yasin Seker

10 August 2016	B.93 (3)	3–1	AB Tårnby (4)	Østerbro Stadium, Copenhagen
18:30	Roshani 31'; Granzow 72'; Mourhrib 90'	Report	Christijansen 76'	Referee: Benjamin Leander

10 August 2016	Ballerup-Skovlunde (5)	1–4	Skovshoved IF (4)	Ballerup Idrætspark, Ballerup
18:30	Petersen 53'	Report	Bræmer 44' (pen.), 83'; Vallys 63', 67'	Referee: Benjamin Helm Svedborg

10 August 2016	Fremad Amager (2)	2–1	BK Avarta (3)	Sundby Idrætspark, Copenhagen
18:30	Groth Møller 20'; Friis 87'	Report	Radosavljevic 63'	Referee: Anders Poulsen

10 August 2016	GVI (4)	2–2 (a.e.t.) (5–6 p)	HIK (3)	Nymosen Sports Park, Gentofte
18:30	Lund 24'; Veltz 100'	Report	Green 20'; Ravn-Hansen 94'	Referee: Simon Rosenlund

10 August 2016	Herlev IF (4)	2–3 (a.e.t.)	Hvidovre IF (3)	Herlev Stadion, Herlev
18:30	Makusuti 17'; Grube Jensen 19'	Report	Rasmussen 48'; Nielsen 75'; Simson 118'	Referee: Jonas Hansen

10 August 2016	FC Græsrødderne (8)	1–2	AB (2)	Gentofte Sportspark, Gentofte
20:00	Lykke 90'	Report	Brøgger 65', 69'	Referee: Peter Munch Larsen

16 August 2016	CSC (6)	2–6	FC Helsingør (2)	Kløvermarken, Copenhagen
18:15	Unknown Player 15' (o.g.); Bertelsen 73'	Report	Koch 11', 56', 71'; Nielsen 32'; Olsen 44'; Brun 90'	Referee: Jonas Hansen

== Second round ==
In the second round the bottom six teams from the 2015-16 Superliga and the top two teams from the 2015-16 1st Division enter the competition. Together with the 48 winners from the first round, there will be a total of 56 teams in this round.

The teams are divided into two equal groups, East and West. Since there were more West teams than East team, the three DBU Funen teams, Dalum IF, BK Marienlyst and Otterup B&IK were moved into the East Group.

The draw took place on Friday. 12 August 2016 with matches played on 30 August and 31 August 2016. The draw was organized so that clubs in the Superliga could not meet each other.

=== West ===
30 August 2016	Kjellerup IF (3)	2–0	Odder IGF (3)	Bjergets Idrætsanlæg, Kjellerup
17:30	Buch Møberg 38', 50'	Report		Referee: Esad Deronjic

30 August 2016	Varde IF (4)	1–2	Jammerbugt FC (3)	Sydbank Stadium, Varde
17:30	Özcelik 15'	Report	Rye 23'; Sørensen 30'	Referee: Aydin Uslu

30 August 2016	VSK Aarhus (3)	4–3 (a.e.t.)	Kolding IF (3)	Vejlby-Risskov Idrætscenter, Risskov
17:30	Brodersen 35', 52'; Sloth Jørgensen 73'; Heegaard Dam 114'	Report	Nauttrup 65'; Nielsen 79'; Hedager Jensen 82'	Referee: Bjarke Bruun

30 August 2016	Aabyhøj IF (5)	0–9	Silkeborg IF (1)	Aabyhøj Stadion, Aabyhøj
17:30		Report	Helenius 9', 64'; Albers 12'; Vendelbo 18'; Lyng 30', 80'; Scheel 37'; Hansen 75'; Agger 81'	Referee: Jakob Kehlet

31 August 2016	Lyseng IF (4)	1–4 (a.e.t.)	AC Horsens (1)	Aabyhøj Stadion, Højbjerg
17:00	Strynø 1'	Report	Aabech 89'; Bjerregaard 95', 105'; Finnbogason 114'	Referee: Sandi Putros

31 August 2016	B1909 (5)	0–6	Skive IK (2)	Gillested Park, Odense
17:30		Report	Henriksen 19', 31', 65'; Kock 36'; Mogensen 55', 57'	Referee: Allan Staal

31 August 2016	Flemløse/Hårby (6)	0–5	Esbjerg fB (1)	Flemløse Stadion, Glamsbjerg
17:30		Report	Mabil 12', 86'; Jessen 18'; Söder 67'; Sørensen 89'	Referee: Jørgen Daugbjerg Burchardt

31 August 2016	Lystrup IF (4)	2–6	Randers FC (1)	Lystrup Idrætsanlæg, Lystrup
17:30	Nygaard 41'; Jenning Bach 90'	Report	Ishak 14'; Pourié 32', 42', 28'; Babayan 35'; Marxen 63'	Referee: Chris Johansen

31 August 2016	OKS (5)	0–2	Viborg FF (1)	OKSON-Park, Odense
17:30		Report	Curth 62'; Deble 72'	Referee: Peter Rasmussen

31 August 2016	Aalborg Freja (5)	0–5	AGF (1)	Ceres Park, Aarhus
17:30		Report	Olsen 5', 40'; Rasmussen 18', 43'; Gasberg 72' (pen.)	Referee: Morten Krogh

7 September 2016	Brabrand IF (3)	2–4	FC Fredericia (2)	Brabrand Idrætsanlæg, Brabrand
17:30	Kaljo 18'; Ørbæk Knudsen 84'	Report	Raben 10'; Nissen 36'; Hebo Rasmussen 40'; Dhia Putros 46'	Referee: Henrik Overgaard

7 September 2016	Nørresundby (5)	1–5	AaB (1)	Lundholm Høje Stadion, Nørresundby
17:30	Højer 84' (pen.)	Report	Holgersson 25'; Enevoldsen 42', 48'; Grønning 59'; Pohl 89'	Referee: Mads-Kristoffer Kristoffersen

7 September 2016	Vendsyssel FF (2)	2–0	Hobro IK (2)	Bredbånd Nord Arena, Hjørring
17:30	Leonco 7'; Dalgaard 45'	Report		Referee: Mikkel Redder

7 September 2016	Velje BK (2)	0–4	OB (1)	Vejle Stadium, Vejle
17:30		Report	Jönsson 28', 59'; Festersen 44'; Mikkelsen 85'	Referee: Morten Krogh

=== East ===
30 August 2016	NB Bornholm (5)	0–4	BK Frem (3)	Nexø Stadion, Nexø
16:15		Report	Conradsen 62', 76'; Holm 73'; Sundstrup 89'	Referee: Martin Køster

30 August 2016	Dalum IF (3)	0–1	Holbæk B&I (3)	Dalum Stadium, Odense
17:30		Report	Sjørslev 41'	Referee: Paw Johansen

30 August 2016	IF Skjold Birkerød (5)	0–3	HIK (3)	Birkerød Stadion, Birkerød
17:30		Report	Ravn Nielsen 35'; Kiel Smed 46'; Green 83'	Referee: Jesper Nielsen

30 August 2016	KFUM Roskilde (4)	1–4	B.93 (3)	Lillevang Idrætscente, Roskilde
17:30	Selvi 81'	Report	Czajkowski 36', 44'; Olsen 47', 85'	Referee: Benjamin Willaume-Jantzen

30 August 2016	Ledøje-Smørum BK (4)	2–7	AB (2)	Ledøje Idrætscenter, Smørum
17:30	Lind Jørgensen 66', 72'	Report	Henriksen 9'; Kvist 15'; Holten 38'; Sharza 40', 46'; Brøgger 63', 90'	Referee: Anders Poulsen

30 August 2016	Otterup B&IK (5)	0–4	Hvidovre IF (3)	Otterup Stadium, Otterup
17:30		Report	Simson 26'; Dumic 41'; Andreasen 43'; Nielsen 55'	Referee: Søren Stagaard

30 August 2016	Tårnby FF (5)	1–4	FC Nordsjælland (1)	Vestamager Idrætsanlæg, Kastrup
17:30	Bernburg 90'	Report	Donyoh 8'; Yaqoob 73'; Naah 90'	Referee: Michael Johansen

31 August 2016	B1908 (4)	1–5	BK Marienlyst (3)	Sundby Idrætspark, Copenhagen
17:30	Larsen 66'	Report	Krøll Rasmussen 3'; Dyrløv Madsen 35'; Kongstedt 60'; Naser 68'; Thomsen 81'	Referee: Thomas Dahl Strandberg

31 August 2016	Fredensborg BI (3)	0–4	FC Helsingør (2)	Fredensborg Stadion, Fredensborg
17:30		Report	Aaquist 13', 81'; Koch 15', 30'	Referee: Jonas Hansen

31 August 2016	Frederiksværk (7)	1–3	Lyngby BK (1)	Frederiksværk Stadion, Frederiksværk
17:30	Nielsen 82'	Report	Gytkjær 18', 24', 25'	Referee: Lars Christoffersen

31 August 2016	VB 1968 (6)	0–2	Fremad Amager (2)	Skovbrynet Skole, Bagsværd
17:30		Report	Mortesen 38'; Kaagh 60'	Referee: Benjamin Leander

5 September 2016	Nykøbing FC (2)	2–2 (a.e.t.) (3–4 p)	Næstved BK (2)	Nykøbing Falster Idrætspark, Nykøbing Falster
18:30	Jensen 67'; Wagner 82'	Report	Illum 14'; Mertz 18' (pen.)	Referee: Benjamin Willaume-Jantzen

7 September 2016	Døllefjelde Musse IF (5)	0–3	HB Køge (2)	DMI's anlæg, Døllefjelde Musse
17:30		Report	Arrocha 8'; Wolhgemuth 24' (pen.); Krdzic 41'	Referee: Kenneth Sørensen

7 September 2016	Skovshoved IF (4)	1–3	FC Roskilde (2)	Skovshoved Idrætspark, Skovshoved
17:30	Bræmer 39'	Report	Pedersen 1'; Nielsen 55'; Storm 87'	Referee: Jakob A. Sundberg

== Third round ==
In the third round the top four teams from the 2016–17 Danish Superliga enter the competition, and together with the 28 winners from the second round, there will be 32 teams in this round.

The draw is organized so that clubs in the Super League can not face each other.

The draw took place on Friday. 9 September 2016.

11 October 2016	HIK (3)	1–3 (a.e.t.)	Randers FC (1)	Gentofte Sportspark, Gentofte
18:15	Lau 105'	Report	Pourié 95', 99'; Allansson 112'	Attendance: 685; Referee: Lars Christrofferson

12 October 2016	Skive IK (2)	1–3 (a.e.t.)	Silkeborg IF (1)	Spar Nord Arena, Skive
19:00	Pedersen 64'	Report	Albers 90'; Agger 109'; Lyng 117'	Attendance: 906; Referee: Sandi Putros

13 October 2016	B.93 (3)	1–0	Esbjerg FB (1)	Østerbro Stadium, Copenhagen
19:00	Ogude 87'	Report		Attendance: 432; Referee: Peter Kjærsgaard

19 October 2016	Vendsyssel FF (2)	2–1	OB (1)	Bredbånd Nord Arena, Hjørring
19:00	Brandão 59', 69'	Report	Jocobsen 24'	Attendance: 523; Referee: Michael Tykgaard

25 October 2016	Kjellerup IF (3)	4–3 (a.e.t.)	Lyngby BK (1)	Bjergets Idrætsanlæg, Kjellerup
15:15	Nielsen 57'; Lind 77'; Dahl 87'; Bang Nielsen 110'	Report	Rise 14'; Rasmussen 19'; Odgaard 31'	Attendance: 512; Referee: Mads-Kristoffer Kristoffersen

25 October 2016	Hvidovre IF (3)	0–2	SønderjyskE (1)	Hvidovre Stadium, Hvidovre, Copenhagen
18:30		Report	Kløve 89', 90'	Attendance: 485; Referee: Jørgen Daugbjerg Burchardt

26 October 2016	FC Helsingør (2)	0–1	AC Horsens (1)	Helsingør Stadium, Helsingør
15:15		Report	Jespersen 38'	Attendance: 503; Referee: Anders Poulsen

26 October 2016	VSK Aarhus (3)	0–1	AaB (1)	Vejlby-Risskov Idrætscenter, Risskov
15:15		Report	Børsting 55'	Attendance: 677; Referee: Jakob Kehlet

26 October 2016	Jammerbugt FC (3)	1–6	F.C. Copenhagen (1)	Nordkyske Arena, Aalborg
17:30	Jensen 69'	Report	Keita 4'; Falk 29'; Roerslev 46'; Kristoffersen 58'; Røjkjær 79', 82'	Attendance: 651; Referee: Jens Maae

26 October 2016	FC Roskilde (2)	2–1	FC Fredericia (2)	Roskilde Idrætspark, Roskilde
19:00	Storm 16'; Lindberg 49'	Report	Putros 77' (pen.)	Attendance: 713; Referee: Jesper Nielsen

26 October 2016	Holbæk B&I (3)	1–3	AGF (1)	SuRi Park, Holbæk
19:00	Ustrup 30'	Report	Backman 19'; Junker 42'; Ikonomodis 90'	Attendance: 740; Referee: Sandi Putros

26 October 2016	BK Marienlyst (3)	2–2 (a.e.t.) (4–2 p)	AB (2)	Marienlystcentret, Odense
19:00	Lærche 6', 35'	Report	Thomsen 59'; Rhode 75'	Attendance: 130; Referee: Aydin Uslu

26 October 2016	BK Frem (3)	1–2	Brøndby IF (1)	Valby Idrætspark, Valby. Copenhagen
20:15	Camili 30'	Report	'Greko' Jackobsen 14'; Pukki 82'	Attendance: 6,543; Referee: Peter Kjærsgaard

27 October 2016	Fremad Amager (2)	1–3	FC Midtjylland (1)	Sundby Idrætspark, Copenhagen
19:45	Senoglu 82'	Report	Duelund 34'; Olsson 58'; Onuachu 90'	Attendance: 2,588; Referee: Lars Christoffersen

2 November 2016	HB Køge (2)	2–1	Viborg FF (1)	Castus Park, Herfølge
19:00	Lazarevic 14'; Rochester Sørensen 24'	Report	Frederiksen 49'	Attendance: 452; Referee: Morten Krogh

2 November 2016	Næstved BK (2)	1–0	FC Nordsjælland (1)	Euro Outlets Stadion, Næstved
19:00	Illum 62' (pen.)	Report		Attendance: 548; Referee: Mads-Kristoffer Kristoffersen

== Fourth round ==
The draw took place on Friday, November 4, 2016.

28 February 2017	Vendsyssel FF (2)	4–0	HB Køge (2)	Bredbånd Nord Arena, Hjørring
19:00	Gouriye 4', 38'; Olsen 25'; Leonco 49'	Report		Attendance: 731; Referee: Sandi Putros

1 March 2017	B.93 (3)	0–3	F.C. Copenhagen (1)	Telia Parken, Copenhagen
19:00		Report	Kristoffersen 23'; Kusk 27', 49'	Attendance: 3,984; Referee: Anders Poulsen

2 March 2017	AaB (1)	5–0	Silkeborg IF (1)	Nordjyske Arena, Aalborg
19:30	Thellufsen 25', 38', 52', 79'; Flores 52'	Report		Attendance: 3,912; Referee: Anders Poulsen

7 March 2017	Kjellerup IF (3)	0–3	FC Midtjylland (1)	Mascot Park, Silkeborg
17:45		Report	Bruninho 13'; Duelund 17'; Kroon 34'	Attendance: 1,321; Referee: Jørgen Daugbjerg Buchardt

8 March 2017	BK Marienlyst (3)	1–4	Brøndby IF (1)	Brøndby Stadium, Brøndby
17:45	Esben-Petersen 37' (pen.)	Report	Austin 20'; Crone 24'; Wilczek 32'; Kalmár 34'	Attendance: 3,102; Referee: Lars Christoffersen

8 March 2017	Næstved BK (2)	3–2	FC Roskilde (2)	Euro Outlet Stadion, Næstved
19:00	P. Nygaard Hansen 35'; S. Nygaard Hansen 45'; Christiansen 81'	Report	Lissau 34'; Jørgensen 75'	Attendance: 479; Referee: Michael Johansen

15 March 2017	AC Horsens (1)	1–3	AGF (1)	CASA Arena Horsens, Horsens
18:00	Tshiembe 7'	Report	Junker 62', 81', 86'	Attendance: 2,271; Referee: Michael Tykgaard

15 March 2017	Randers FC (1)	1–0	SønderjyskE (1)	BioNutria Park, Randers
18:00	Pourie 15' (pen.)	Report		Attendance: 2,608; Referee: Jens Maae

== Quarter-finals ==
The Quarter-final draw took place on Friday, March 17, 2017.

5 April 2017	Næstved BK (2)	1–2	Vendsyssel FF (2)	Næstved Stadium, Næstved
18:00	Bechmann Timm 19'	Report	Leonco 15' (pen.); Moses 76'	Attendance: 674; Referee: Lars Christrofferson

5 April 2017	AaB (1)	2–3	FC Midtjylland (1)	Aalborg Stadium, Aalborg
18:00	Würtz 33' (pen.); Risgård 77'	Report	Onuachu 22', 29'; Novák 52'	Attendance: 4,124; Referee: Jakob Kehlet

6 April 2017	F.C. Copenhagen (1)	2–1	AGF (1)	Telia Parken, Copenhagen
19:30	Pavlović 45'; Augustinsson 82'	Report	Spelmann 48'	Attendance: 7,755; Referee: Anders Poulsen

13 April 2017	Randers FC (1)	2–4 (a.e.t.)	Brøndby IF (1)	BioNutria Park, Randers
18:30	Bruhn 15'; Pourié 39'	Report	Wilczek 5'; Mukhtar 89', 93'; Kalmár 97'	Attendance: 5,438; Referee: Jørgen Daugbjerg Buchardt

== Semi-finals ==
The DBU changed the Semi-final format this season. Instead of a two-leg aggregate, the semi-finals will just be played as a single match. The Semi-final draw was held on April 7, 2017.

27 April 2017	Vendsyssel FF (2)	0–2	F.C. Copenhagen (1)	Hjørring Stadium, Hjørring
19:00		Report	Greguš 20'; Kusk 74'	Attendance: 5,281; Referee: Michael Tykgaard

4 May 2017	FC Midtjylland (1)	1–2	Brøndby IF (1)	MCH Arena, Herning
18:30	Poulsen 29' (pen.)	Report	Pukki 34'; Norgaard 90'	Attendance: 9,475; Referee: Mads-Kristoffer Kristoffersen

== Final ==
25 May 2017
17:00

F.C. Copenhagen (1)	3–1	Brøndby (1)
Cornelius 51', 85'; Santander 83'	Report	Pukki 61'

Parken Stadion, Copenhagen
Attendance: 32,140
Referee: Jens Maae
