= 2017–18 Danish Cup =

DBU Pokalen (The DBU Cup)

Tournament details
- Country: Denmark
- Teams: 101

Final positions
- Champions: Brøndby
- Runners-up: Silkeborg IF
- UEFA Europa League: Brøndby

Tournament statistics
- Matches played: 101

The 2017–18 Danish Cup was the 64th season of the Danish Cup competition. Brøndby won the tournament, earning qualification into the third qualifying round of the 2018–19 UEFA Europa League.

== Structure ==
In the first round, there will be 87 teams. 55 coming from the qualifiers among series teams in season 2016–17 with DBU Bornholm (1 team), DBU Funen (8 teams), DBU Jutland (20 teams) DBU Copenhagen (8 teams), DBU Lolland-Falster (3 teams) and DBU Zealand (15 teams). 22 teams from the 2016–17 2nd Divisions and 8 teams from the 2016–17 1st Division. The last two teams are the bottom two from the 2016–17 Superliga.

In the second round, there will be 52 teams. 43 of them are winners from the first round (plus one team who received a first-round bye) with 6 teams from the 2016–17 Superliga. The last teams are the top two from the 2016–17 1st Division.

In the third round, there will be 32 teams. 26 are winners from the second round. The last teams are the top six from the 2016–17 Superliga.

The remainder of the competition will be in a "knockout" format.

== Participants ==
101 teams will compete for the Danish Cup. All teams from the top three divisions in 2016–17 are automatically entered while lower division teams play qualifying matches to enter the competition.

=== 2017–18 Alka Superliga ===
Club	Entered in	Eliminated in	Eliminated by
AC Horsens	2nd Round	3rd Round	Holbæk B&I
AGF	2nd Round	3rd Round	FC Fredericia
Brøndby	3rd Round	CHAMPION	
FC Helsingør	2nd Round	4th Round	AaB
F.C. Copenhagen	3rd Round	4th Round	Brøndby IF
FC Midtjylland	3rd Round	Semi-Finals	Brøndby IF
FC Nordsjælland	3rd Round	4th Round	Hobro IK
Hobro IK	2nd Round	Quarter-Finals	FC Midtjylland
Lyngby	3rd Round	4th Round	Silkeborg IF
OB	2nd Round	4th Round	FC Midtjylland
Randers FC	2nd Round	Quarter-Finals	Silkeborg IF
Silkeborg	2nd Round	Final	Brøndby
SønderjyskE	3rd Round	Quarter-Finals	Brøndby IF
AaB	2nd Round	Quarter-Finals	FC Fredericia

=== 2017–18 NordicBet Liga ===
Club	Entered in	Eliminated in	Eliminated by
Brabrand IF	1st Round	2nd Round	Vendsyssel FF
Esbjerg fB	1st Round	1st Round	FC Fredericia
FC Fredericia	1st Round	Semi-finals	Silkeborg IF
FC Roskilde	1st Round	1st Round	Nykøbing FC
Fremad Amager	1st Round	3rd Round	OB
HB Køge	1st Round	4th Round	FC Fredericia
Nykøbing FC	1st Round	2nd Round	HB Køge
Skive IK	1st Round	3rd Round	F.C. Copenhagen
Thisted FC	1st Round	1st Round	Hedensted IF
Vejle BK	1st Round	2nd Round	Jammerbugt FC
Vendsyssel FF	1st Round	3rd Round	SønderjyskE
Viborg FF	1st Round	2nd Round	AaB Fodbold

=== 2017–18 Danish 2nd Division ===
Club	2017–18 League	Entered in	Eliminated in	Eliminated by
AB	Group 1	1st Round	2nd Round	Slagelse B&I
BK Avarta	Group 2	1st Round	1st Round	Fremad Amager
B93	Group 1	1st Round	2nd Round	Ledøje-Smørum
Brønshøj BK	Group 1	1st Round	2nd Round	Næstved BK
Dalum IF	Group 2	1st Round	2nd Round	OB
FC Sydvest 05	Group 3	1st Round	2nd Round	Vejgaard B
BK Frem	Group 1	1st Round	1st Round	Hvidøre IF
Greve	Group 2	1st Round	3rd Round	FC Midtjylland
HIK	Group 2	1st Round	3rd Round	Silkeborg IF
Hvidovre IF	Group 1	1st Round	3rd Round	FC Helsingør
Jammerbugt FC	Group 3	1st Round	4th Round	SønderjyskE
Kjellerup IF	Group 3	1st Round	2nd Round	Silkeborg IF
Kolding IF	Group 2	1st Round	2nd Round	Hobro IK
BK Marienlyst	Group 2	1st Round	1st Round	Otterup B&IK
Middelfart G&BK	Group 2	1st Round	3rd Round	AaB
Næsby BK	Group 2	1st Round	2nd Round	VB 1968
Næstved BK	Group 1	1st Round	3rd Round	HB Køge
Odder IGF	Group 3	1st Round	1st Round	Jammerbugt FC
VSK Aarhus	Group 3	1st Round	2nd Round	AGF
Aarhus Fremad	Group 3	1st Round	2nd Round	Hedensted IF

=== DBU Bornholm ===
Club	2017–18 League	Entered in	Eliminated in	Eliminated by
NB Bornholm	Copenhagen Series	1st Round	1st Round	Husum BK

=== DBU Funen ===
Club	2017–18 League	Entered in	Eliminated in	Eliminated by
Allesø GF	Funen Series 1	1st Round	1st Round	Vejle BK
B1913	Denmark Series	1st Round	2nd Round	Hvidovre IF
Krarup/Espe SG&IF	Albani Series	1st Round	1st Round	Varde IF
KRFK	Funen Series 1	1st Round	1st Round	Næsby BK
Marstal/Rise	Albani Series	1st Round	1st Round	FC Sydvest
Otterup B&IK	Albani Series	1st Round	3rd Round	Randers FC
Tarup-Paarup IF	Denmark Series	1st Round	1st Round	Dalum IF
Tåsinge fB	Funen Series 1	1st Round	1st Round	Kolding IF

=== DBU Jutland ===
Club	2017–18 League	Entered in	Eliminated in	Eliminated by
Agerbæk SF/Starup IF	Jutland Series	1st Round	2nd Round	Randers FC
Birkelse IF	Jutland Series 1	1st Round	1st Round	Vejgaard B
Bramming B	Jutland Series 1	1st Round	1st Round	Agerbæk/Starup
Christiansbjerg IF	Jutland Series 1	1st Round	1st Round	Aabyhøj
DGL 2000	Jutland Series	1st Round	1st Round	Brabrand
Egen UI	Jutland Series 1	1st Round	1st Round	Middelfart G&BK
FC Sønderborg	Denmark Series	1st Round	1st Round	B1913
Hatting/Torsted	Jutland Series	1st Round	1st Round	RKG
Hedensted IF	Denmark Series	1st Round	3rd Round	Lyngby
Hirtshals BK	Jutland Series 1	1st Round	1st Round	Kjellerup IF
Holstebro BK	Denmark Series	1st Round	1st Round	Aarhus Fremad
Linde B	Jutland Series 3	1st Round	1st Round	VSK Aarhus
Lystrup IF	Denmark Series	1st Round	1st Round	Vendsyssel FF
Nørresundby FB	Jutland Series	1st Round	2nd Round	Skive IK
RKG	Jutland Series 1	1st Round	2nd Round	FC Fredericia
Silkeborg KFUM	Jutland Series	1st Round	1st Round	Viborg FF
Varde IF	Denmark Series	1st Round	2nd Round	AC Horsens
VRI	Jutland Series 1	1st Round	1st Round	Skive IK
Vejgaard B	Denmark Series	1st Round	3rd Round	FC Nordsjælland
Aabyhøj IF	Jutland Series	1st Round	2nd Round	Middelfart G&BK

=== DBU Copenhagen ===
Club	2017–18 League	Entered in	Eliminated in	Eliminated by
CSC	Copenhagen Series 1	1st Round	1st Round	Sunred Beach FC
FC Græsrødderne	Copenhagen Series 2	1st Round	1st Round	Vanløse IF
GVI	Denmark Series	1st Round	1st Round	Ledøje-Smørum
Husum BK	Copenhagen Series 1	1st Round	2nd Round	FC Helsingør
Kastrup BK	Denmark Series	1st Round	1st Round	AB
Sunred Beach FC	Copenhagen Series 1	1st Round	2nd Round	Otterup B&IK
Tårnby FF	Copenhagen Series	1st Round	1st Round	Brønshøj BK
Vanløse IF	Denmark Series	1st Round	2nd Round	Fremad Amager

=== DBU Lolland-Falster ===
Club	2017–18 League	Entered in	Eliminated in	Eliminated by
Døllefjelde-Musse IF	Zealand Series	1st Round	1st Round	VB 1968
BK Frem Sakskøbing	Lolland-Falster Series	1st Round	2nd Round	Greve Fodbold
Listrup U&IF	Zealand Series	1st Round	1st Round	Holbæk B&I

=== DBU Zealand ===
Club	2017–18 League	Entered in	Eliminated in	Eliminated by
B1973	Zealand Series 1	1st Round	1st Round	Ballerup-Skovlunde
BSF	Denmark Series	1st Round	2nd Round	Holbæk B&I
Fredensborg BI	Denmark Series	1st Round	2nd Round	HIK
Helsinge Fodbold	Zealand Series 1	1st Round	1st Round	HIK
Herlufsholm GF	Zealand Series	1st Round	1st Round	HB Køge
Herstedøster IC	Zealand Series 1	1st Round	1st Round	BK Frem Sakskøbing
Holbæk B&I	Denmark Series	1st Round	4th Round	Randers FC
KFUM Roskilde	Denmark Series	1st Round	1st Round	Slagelse B&I
Ledøje-Smørum	Denmark Series	1st Round	3rd Round	Brøndby IF
Ringsted IF	Zealand Series	1st Round	1st Round	Fredensborg BI
Rishøj B	Denmark Series	1st Round	1st Round	Greve
Slagelse B&I	Denmark Series	1st Round	3rd Round	Hobro IK
VB 1968	Zealand Series 1	1st Round	3rd Round	Jammerbugt FC
Virum-Sorgenfri BK	Denmark Series	1st Round	1st Round	B93
Ølstykke FC	Zealand Series 1	1st Round	1st Round	Næstved BK

== First round ==
In the tournament's first round, the teams are divided into a Western and Eastern pool. The Western Pool features 47 participating teams, divided into two pools, Funen/Jutland (22 teams) and Jutland (25 teams). The Eastern Pool consists of 40 teams divided into two pools, Zealand/Lolland/Falster (18 teams) and Copenhagen/Bornholm (22 teams).

The draw was held on Monday, 26 June 2017 with matches played between 8 August and 10 August 2017.

=== West, Jutland ===
8 August 2017	Christiansbjerg IF (6)	2–3	Aabyhøj IF (5)	CIF Anlæg, Aarhus
18:30	Farmer 5'; MK Rasmussen 90'	Report	Kristoffersen 49'; 48' (o.g.); Larsen 53'	Referee: Rasmus Nielsen

8 August 2017	Hirtshals BK (6)	2–3 (a.e.t.)	Kjellerup IF (3)	Schlie Arena, Hirtshals
18:30	Knudsen 10'; N. Andersen 25'	Report	Lind 4', 8'; Larsen 120'	Referee: Michael Rasmussen

8 August 2017	Jammerbugt FC (3)	3–0	Odder IGF (3)	Jetsmark Stadion, Pandrup
18:30	Hyltoft 74'; Ahlmann 75'; D. Nielsen 86'	Report		Referee: Michael V. Jensen

8 August 2017	RKG (6)	2–0	Hatting/Torsted (5)	Klarup Stadion, Klarup
18:30	T. Nielsen 72'; Rasmussen 87'	Report		Referee: Patrick Remon Andersen

9 August 2017	DGL 2000 (5)	0–3	Brabrand IF (2)	TBD, Aarhus
18:30		Report	Ørbæk Knudsen 39'; Kjeldsen 62'; Linen 85'	Referee: Henrik Overgaard

9 August 2017	Hedensted IF (4)	3–2	Thisted FC (2)	HM Park, Hedensted
18:30	Givskov 4'; Mirsad Suljic 38', 90'	Report	Bust Sørensen 40'; Lauritsen 70'	Referee: Allan Staal

9 August 2017	Holstebro BK (4)	0–3	Aarhus Fremad (3)	Holstebro Idrætspark, Holstebro
18:30		Report	Lyskov 48'; Brodersen 72'; Diab 90'	Referee: Dennis Mogensen

9 August 2017	Linde B (8)	0–12	VSK Aarhus (3)	Langhøjskolen, Struer
18:30		Report	Nygaard 2', 40'; Torp 9', 82'; Brodersen 11'; Memory 17'; Sloth Jørgensen 48', 70', 77'; Høgh Jensen 80', 87', 89'	Attendance: Patrick Remon Andersen

9 August 2017	Lystrup IF (4)	0–3	Vendsyssel FF (2)	Lystrup Idrætsanlæg, Lystrup
18:30		Report	Brandao 30'; Moses 44'; Ogude 90'	Referee: Aydin Uslu

9 August 2017	Silkeborg KFUM (5)	1–3 (a.e.t.)	Viborg FF (2)	TBD, Silkeborg
18:30	Røjkjær 87'	Report	Beck Goldsmith 20', 114'; Thychosen 94'	Referee: Sandi Putros

9 August 2017	VRI (6)	0–4	Skive IK (2)	NES Park, Risskov
18:30		Report	Neighbors 14'; Pedersen 18', 34'; Andreas Kock 76'	Referee: Chris Johansen

15 August 2017	Birkelse IF (6)	1–3	Vejgaard (4)	Nordjyske Bank Arena, Birkelse
18:30	Besic 72'	Report	Skjødt Andersen 17', 40', 61'	Referee: Morten Bach Jepsen

Nørresundby BK received a bye in the first round.

=== West, Funen/Jutland ===
8 August 2017	Marstal/Rise (5)	0–1	FC Sydvest 05 (3)	Marstal Stadion, Marstal
17:30		Report	M. van Ittersum 67'	Referee: Paw Johansen

8 August 2017	B1913 (4)	4–1 (a.e.t.)	FC Sønderborg (4)	Campus Road, Odense
18:30	R. Larsen 89', 115'; Eling 108'; Schousboe 118'	Report	Iversen 32'	Referee: Allan Rørdahl Borgstrøm

8 August 2017	Bramming B (6)	0–5	Agerbaek SF/Starup IF (5)	Skjern Bank Arena, Bramming
18:30		Report	Lauridsen 15'; Poulsen 19'; High Hansen 30'; Lindberg Sørensen 30'; 89' (o.g.)	Referee: Brian Jessen

8 August 2017	Egen UI (6)	2–4	Middelfart G&BK (3)	Guderup Idrætsanlæg, Nordborg
18:30	Schmidt Clausen 19'; Truelsen 25'	Report	Johansen 41', 84'; Brøsted Rasmussen 86'; Zachariassen 90'	Referee: Jonas Rossen

8 August 2017	Krarup/Espe SG&IF (5)	3–4	Varde IF (4)	Espe Hallen, Ringe
18:30	Frandsen 33', 38'; Schmidt Clausen 19'	Report	Møller Christiansen 3'; Puggard 60'; Lund 75'; Backs 81'	Referee: Thomas Isen

8 August 2017	KRFK (5)	0–3	Næsby BK (3)	Krogsbølle Stadion, Otterup
18:30		Report	Weber 12', 76' (pen.); Skovgaard Jensen 14' (pen.)	Referee: Søren Stagaard

8 August 2017	Otterup B&IK (5)	3–2	BK Marienlyst (3)	Nordfyns Bank Arena, Otterup
18:30	Chilvers 39'; Davidsen 55'; Tubæk 79'	Report	Svaneberg Hansen 7'; Augustinus Hansen 26'	Referee: Jonas Bøgelund

8 August 2017	Tåsinge BK (6)	0–5	Kolding IF (3)	SEF Energi Arena, Svendborg
18:30		Report	Ritting 12', 32', 83'; Buhl Jensen 73'; Jepsen 90'	Referee: Midhat Sulejmanovic

9 August 2017	Allesø GF (6)	0–3	Vejle BK (2)	Spurvelundsskolen, Odense
18:30		Report	Madsen 10'; Andreasen 45'; Egholm 55'	Referee: Allan Rørdahl Borgstrøm

9 August 2017	Tarup-Paarup IF (4)	1–2	Dalum IF (3)	Tarup Home Park, Odense
18:30	Kristensen 35' (pen.)		Høgstad 43'; D. Jensen 50' (pen.)	Referee: Paw Johansen

9 August 2017	FC Fredericia (2)	4–0	Esbjerg fB (2)	Monjasa Park, Fredericia
18:30	Putros 5'; Lopez 65'; Letort 73', 90'	Report		Referee: Morten Krogh

=== East, Copenhagen/Bornholm ===
8 August 2017	Husum BK (6)	1–0	NB Bornholm (5)	Husumparken, Brønshøj
18:00	Frydensbjerg Petersen 10'	Report		Referee: Frederik Lysemose Hoffmann

8 August 2017	Virum-Sorgenfri BK (4)	3–6	B.93 (3)	Virum Stadion, Virum
18:15	Al-Bahadli 45'; Youssef Mahmoud 49'; Vraae 88'	Report	Olsen 19'; Ali 24', 51'; Roshani 32', 82'; Berg Hansen 88'	Referee: Frida Mia Klarlund Nielsen

8 August 2017	Hvidovre IF (3)	1–0	BK Frem (3)	Kæmpernes Arena, Hvidovre
18:30	Østberg Hansen 62'	Report		Referee: Anders Poulsen

8 August 2017	Kastrup BK (4)	1–4	AB (3)	Røllikevej, Kastrup
18:30	Christoffersen 26'	Report	Uth 24'; Olsen 34'; Nygaard Hansen 59'; Jacob Lerche 73'	Referee: Jakob A. Sundberg

8 August 2017	Ledøje-Smørum (4)	3–3 (a.e.t.) (4–3 p)	GVI (4)	Ledøje Idrætscenter, Smørum
18:30	Wulff 42'; Rasmussen 107'; Kjærsgaard 115'	Report	Christensen 25'; Østgaard 94'; Vibholm 109'	Referee: Simon Rosenlund

8 August 2017	Tårnby FF (5)	1–2	Brønshøj BK (3)	Vestamager Idrætsanlæg, Kastrup
18:30	Andersen 31'	Report	Buch 3'; Bechmann Timm 67'	Referee: Casper Thorsøe Jr.

8 August 2017	FC Græsrødderne (7)	2–3	Vanløse IF (4)	Gentofte Stadion, Gentofte
19:00	Udsen 42'; Wozniacki 58'		Hussein 32'; O. Merling Hansen 37'; Chistroffersen 82'	Referee: Sebastian Friis Aagerup

9 August 2017	BK Avarta (3)	0–5	Fremad Amager (2)	Espelundens Idrætsanlæg, Rødovre
18:30		Report	Nordstrand 24', 52', 56'; 58' (o.g.); Engel 63'	Referee: Kasper Madsen

9 August 2017	Helsinge Fodbold (6)	0–2	HIK (3)	Helsinge Stadion, Helsinge
18:30		Report	Therkildsen 34'; Long 75'	Referee: Anders Skjødt Voergaard

9 August 2017	Sunred Beach FC (6)	2–2 (a.e.t.) (4–2 p)	CSC (6)	Ryparken Idrætsanlæg, Copenhagen
19:30	Lyngby 24'; Mikkelsen 119'	Report	Bertelsen 72' (pen.), 103' (pen.)	Referee: Martin Køster

15 August 2017	BSF (5)	3–1	B1973 (6)	Ballerup Idrætspark, Ballerup
18:15	Tidemand 45', 69'; Lynge Nielsen 87'	Report	Eriksen 6'	Referee: Tinna Høj Christensen

=== East, Zealand/Lolland/Falster ===
8 August 2017	Herstedøster IC (5)	0–1	BK Frem Sakskøbing (6)	Herstedøster Stadion, Albertslund
18:30		Report	Stryger 23'	Referee: Nikolaj Mose Dreisig Hansen

8 August 2017	Listrup U&IF (5)	0–5	Holbæk B&I (4)	LUIF's anlæg, Nykøbing Falster
18:30		Report	Thomsen 17'; Hjort 28'; Halling 68'; Sjørslev 71'; Andrew Kakooza 90' (pen.)	Referee: Patrick Stenzel Rasmussen

8 August 2017	Ringsted IF (5)	0–1	Fredensborg BI (4)	Ringsted Stadion, Ringsted
18:30		Report	Sørensen 24'	Referee: Emil Martinussen

8 August 2017	Slagelse B&I (4)	3–0	KFUM Roskilde (4)	Slagelse Stadion, Slagelse
18:30	Hidiroglu 4', 45' (pen.); P. Andersen 55'	Report		Referee: Benjamin Helm Svedborg

8 August 2017	VB1968 (6)	4–1	Døllefjelde Musse IF (6)	Værebro Stadion, Bagsværd
18:30	Saidi 7'; Demirbas 18', 61'; Dencker Jørgensen 82' (o.g.)	Report	Dencker Jørgensen 86'	Referee: Christian Hansen

9 August 2017	FC Roskilde (2)	0–1	Nykøbing FC (2)	Roskilde Idrætspark, Roskilde
18:30		Report	Bonde Jensen 79'	Referee: Benjamin Willaume-Jantzen

9 August 2017	Herlufsholm GF (5)	0–5	HB Køge (2)	Herlufsholm Stadion, Næstved
18:30		Report	Törnros 15', 29'; Laustrup 63'; Lassen 74'; Mortensen 81'	Referee: Jesper Nielsen

9 August 2017	Rishøj B (5)	0–6	Greve (3)	Rishøj Stadion, Køge
18:30		Report	Tangvig Sørensen 28', 62'; Frank 38'; Dumic 64', 66' (pen.); Petersen 81'	Referee: Jonathan Nilton

9 August 2017	Ølstykke FC (6)	1–3	Næstved BK (3)	Ølstykke Stadion, Ølstykke
18:30	Mathias Pointinger 19'	Report	Mourhrib 54', 87'; Mertz 81' (pen.)	Referee: Peter Munch Larsen

== Second round ==
For this round, the teams are divided into two equal groups, East and West. There were more West teams than East teams in the draw, so 5 Fynian teams were relocated to the East Pool – B1913, Dalum IF, OB, Næsby and Otterup. The draw was held on Friday, August 11, 2017 and was organized so that clubs in the 2017–18 Superliga can not play each other.

=== West ===
29 August 2017	Agerbæk SF/Starup IF (5)	2–7	Randers FC (1)	Starup Stadion, Grindsted
17:30	Jensen 60'; Poulsen 72'	Report	Mølvadgaard 10'; Djurdjic 21'; Lobjanidze 26'; Bruhn 44'; Pourié 65'; Agesen 77'; Mame 79'	Referee: Jørgen Daugbjerg Burchardt

29 August 2017	Hedensted IF (4)	1–0	Aarhus Fremad (3)	Hedensted Stadion, Hedensted
17:30	Suljic 17' (pen.)	Report		Referee: Mads-Kristoffer Kristoffersen

29 August 2017	Jammerbugt FC (3)	3–1	Vejle BK (2)	Jetsmark Stadion, Pandrup
17:30	Steffensen 48'; Rye 71'; Nielsen 75'	Report	Sverrisson 43'	Referee: Mikkel Saves

29 August 2017	Vejgaard (4)	4–3	FC Sydvest 05 (3)	Soffy Road, Aalborg
17:30	Pedersen 39'; A. Sloth-Kristensen 64'; M. Sloth-Kristensen 76'; Højgaard 90'	Report	Sørensen 3'; Dum 58'; Degn 70'	Referee: Michael Rasmussen

29 August 2017	Aabyhøj IF (5)	3–4 (a.e.t.)	Middelfart G&BK (3)	Aabyhøj Stadion, Aabyhøj
17:30	Hoe 22'; Hammershøj 30'; Lose 51'	Report	Johansen 20', 34'; Andreasen 90', 114'	Referee: Esad Deronjic

29 August 2017	Kolding IF (3)	0–1	Hobro IK (1)	Autocentral Park, Kolding
19:00			Grønning 40'	Referee: Jakob Kehlet

29 August 2017	VSK Aarhus (3)	1–4	AGF (1)	Ceres Park, Aarhus
19:00	Sivertsen 39'	Report	Bundu 8', 22'; Sana 14'; Torp 90' (pen.)	Referee: Jens Maae

30 August 2017	Nørresundby FB (5)	2–3	Skive IK (2)	Nordjyske Bank Arena, Nørresundby
17:30	Toft 84' (pen.); C.K. Jensen 90'	Report	Thomsen 49'; Kock 61'; Brandhof 83'	Referee: Aydini Uslu

30 August 2017	RKG (6)	1–8	FC Fredericia (2)	Klarup Stadion, Klarup
17:30	Rasmussen 68'	Report	McGrath 3', 11'; Petersen 8', 65'; Putros 13' (pen.); Fazlagic 42'; Lopez 62'; Sørensen 66'	Referee: Michael V. Jensen

30 August 2017	Varde IF (4)	3–5 (a.e.t.)	AC Horsens (1)	Sydbank Stadion, Varde
17:30	Holm 20'; Jelstrup 88'; Forst Jensen 90'	Report	Okosun 31', 64'; Tshiembe 55'; Jacobsen 97'; Ludwig 100'	Referee: Morten Krogh

6 September 2017	Vendsyssel FF (2)	1–0 (a.e.t.)	Brabrand IF (2)	Bredbånd Nord Arena, Hjørring
19:00	Jensen 101'	Report		Referee: Mikkel Redder

6 September 2017	Viborg FF (2)	1–5 (a.e.t.)	AaB (1)	Energi Viborg Arena, Viborg
19:30	Kamper 7'	Report	Rolim 90'; Pohl 97'; Brønding 99'; Safranko 105'; Risgård 110'	Attendance: 2,515; Referee: Dennis Mogensen

19 September 2017	Kjellerup IF (3)	0–6	Silkeborg IF (1)	JYSK Park, Silkeborg
16:30		Report	Møldrup Okkels 22'; Vatsadze 30', 47'; Skhirtladze 50'; Nilsson 57', 67'	Referee: Mads-Kristoffer Kristoffersen

=== East ===
29 August 2017	B1913 (4)	1–3	Hvidovre IF (3)	Campus Road, Odense
17:30	Ahmed 1'	Report	Brandt Hansen 32'; Aabech 36'; Andreasen 89'	Referee: Allan Rørdahl Borgstrøm

29 August 2017	BSF (5)	1–5	Holbæk B&I (3)	Ballerup Idrætspark, Ballerup
17:30	Randrup 52'	Report	Bobjerg Larsen 23'; Johansen 57'; Halling 62', 88'; Billeskov 74'	Referee: Sebastian Friis Aagerup

29 August 2017	Dalum IF (3)	0–1	OB (1)	Dalum Stadion Odense
17:30		Report	Eskesen 89'	Referee: Sandi Putros

29 August 2017	Frem Sakskøbing (6)	0–9	Greve (3)	Inges Auto Park, Sakskøbing
17:30		Report	Jensen 25', 47'; Tangvig Sørensen 28', 56', 90'; Knudsen 71', 81'; Dumic 77'; Qvapp 84'	Referee: Patrick Stenzel Rasmussen

29 August 2017	Ledøje-Smørum (4)	1–0	B.93 (3)	Ledøje Idrætscenter, Smørum
17:30		Report	Madsen 75'	Referee: Tinna Høj Christensen

29 August 2017	VB 1968 (6)	1–0	Næsby BK (3)	Skovbrynet Skole, Bagsværd
17:30		Report	Own Goal 75'	Referee: Christian Hansen

29 August 2017	Slagelse B&I (3)	2–1 (a.e.t.)	AB (3)	Slagelse Stadium, Slagelse
18:30	Hidroglu 43'; Jensen 98' (pen.)	Report	Nielsen 90'	Referee: Benjamin Helm Svedborg

30 August 2017	Vanløse IF (4)	1–3	Fremad Amager (2)	Vanløse Idrætspark, Vanløse
17:30	Castelijns 90' (pen.)	Report	Kaagh 22'; Vatnsdal 27'; Abdalas 83'	Referee: Benjamin Willaume-Jantzen

30 August 2017	Brønshøj BK (3)	0–2	Næstved BK (3)	Tingbjerg Idrætspark, Brønshøj
19:00		Report	Moos 82'; Munksgaard 86'	Referee: Kasper Madsen

30 August 2017	HB Køge (2)	4–3 (a.e.t.)	Nykøbing FC (2)	Castus Park, Herfølge
19:00	Lassen 17', 57'; Rochester Sørensen 33'; Bah 101'	Report	Koch 6'; Holten 31', 58'	Referee: Jesper Nielsen

30 August 2017	Sunred Beach (6)	1–5	Otterup B&IK (5)	Ryparkens Idrætsanlæg, Copenhagen
19:30	Larsen 90'	Report	Chilvers 20'; Davidsen 30', 48'; Villemoes 60'; Tubæk 85'	Referee: Mostafa Seyfi

5 September 2017	Fredensborg BI (4)	1–2	HIK (3)	Fredensborg Stadion, Fredensborg
17:30	Göde 70'	Report	Own Goal 20'; Hebo Rasumssen 10' (pen.)	Referee: Martin Køster

5 September 2017	Husum BK (6)	0–3	FC Helsingør (1)	Tingbjerg Idrætspark, Brønshøj
18:30		Report	Stückler 31'; Kvist 87'; Jorsensen 93'	Referee: Benjamin Willaume-Jantzen

== Third round ==
In the third round, the top six teams from the 2016-17 Danish Superliga will enter the competition, joining the 26 winners from the second round matches. The 32-team draw for the third round will also be organized so that clubs in the 2017–18 Superliga can not play each other. Third Round matches will be played between September 19–21, 2017.

The draw was held on Monday, September 4, 2017.

19 September 2017	VB 1968 (6)	0–3	Jammerbugt FC (3)	Værebro Skole, Bagsværd
16:30		Report	Own Goal 72'; Hyltoft 84'; Tved Hansen 93'	Referee: Jakob A. Sundberg

20 September 2017	Næstved BK (3)	1–3	HB Køge (2)	Euro Outlets Stadium, Næstved
16:30	Schnack Mertz 21' (pen.)	Report	Nick Lassen 24'; Hassan Ahmed 68'; Haüser 85'	Referee: Jesper Nielsen

20 September 2017	Greve Fodbold (3)	0–7	FC Midtjylland (1)	Greve Idrætscenter, Greve
16:30		Report	Novak 14'; Onuachu 26', 61', 65', 72'; Munksgaard Nielsen 74'; Dal Hende 77'	Referee: Jakob Kehlet

20 September 2017	Hedensted IF (4)	1–3	Lyngby BK (1)	Hedensted Stadion, Hedensted
16:30	Kahr Christensen 28'	Report	Rygaard Jensen 15'; Knudsen Larsen 23'; Borild Kjær 33'	Referee: Jens Grabski Maae

20 September 2017	Middelfart G&BK (3)	0–2	AaB (1)	Middelfart Stadium, Middlefart
16:30		Report	Børsting 27', 40'	Attendance: 1,121; Referee: Jørgen Daugbjerg Burchardt

20 September 2017	Otterup B&IK (4)	0–2	Randers FC (1)	Nordfyns Bank Arena, Otterup
16:30		Report	Pourie 41'; Mølvadgaard 50'	Referee: Morten Krogh

20 September 2017	Skive IK (2)	0–3	F.C. Copenhagen (1)	SPAR Nord Arena, Skive
18:15		Report	Holse 6', 36'; Kusk 68'	Attendance: 2,364; Referee: Michael Tykgaard

20 September 2017	Holbæk B&I (4)	1–0	AC Horsens (1)	SuRi Park, Holbæk
19:00	Lauritz Adamsen 58'	Report		Referee: Sandi Putros

20 September 2017	Hvidovre IF (3)	0–0 (a.e.t.) (3–4 p)	FC Helsingør (1)	Hvidovre Stadion, Hvidovre
19:00		Report		Referee: Benjamin Willaume-Jantzen

20 September 2017	Slagelse B&I (4)	1–5	Hobro IK (1)	Slagelse Stadium, Slagelse
19:00	Rygaard 48'	Report	Amankwah 3'; Grønning 42', 60', 73'; Olsen 86'	Referee: Peter Munch Larsen

20 September 2017	Ledøje-Smørum (4)	1–5	Brøndby IF (1)	Brøndby Stadium, Brøndby
20:30	Scott Rasmussen 30'	Report	Vigen Christensen 33', 86'; Halimi 57'; Wilczek 71'; Own Goal 79'	Referee: Anders Poulsen

21 September 2017	BK Fremad Amager (2)	2–3	Odense BK (1)	Sundby Idrætspark, Copenhagen
18:15	Morten Nordstrand 44'; Anders Kaagh 85'	Report 1	Nicklas Helenius 9'; Mathias Greve 59'; Jens Jakob Thomasen 86'	Attendance: 1.856; Referee: Mads-Kristoffer Kristoffersen

21 September 2017	FC Fredericia (2)	1–0	AGF (1)	Monjasa Park, Fredericia
20:30	McGrath 69'	Report		Referee: Dennis Mogensen

27 September 2017	Vejgaard (4)	0–4	FC Nordsjælland (1)	Soffy Road, Aalborg
16:15		Report	Skov Olsen 10'; Rasmussen 59', 65'; Fellah 65'	Referee: Dennis Mogensen

27 September 2017	Vendsyssel FF (2)	1–2	SønderjyskE (1)	Nord Energy Arena, Hjørring
17:30	Ifeanyi Ogude 28'	Report	Kløve 9', 50'	Referee: Jakob Kehlet

11 October 2017	HIK (3)	2–2 (a.e.t.) (3–4 p)	Silkeborg IF (1)	Gentofte Stadion, Gentofte
18:45	Kiel Smed 86'; Lange 99'	Report	Marin Gammelby 76'; Gertsen 120'	Referee: Peter Munch Larsen

== Fourth round ==
The 16 winners from the third round will compete in matches to be played between October 24–26, 2017.

25 October 2017	OB (1)	0–3	FC Midtjylland (1)	EWII Park, Odense
18:00		Report	Duelund 36'; Sørloth 54'; Kraev 87'	Referee: Mads-Kristoffer Kristoffersen

25 October 2017	FC Fredericia (2)	2–0	HB Køge (2)	Monjasa Park, Fredericia
19:00	McGrath 47'; Sølvsten Holvad 60'	Report		Referee: Chris Johansen

26 October 2017	Holbæk B&I (4)	1–4	Randers FC (1)	SuRi Park, Holbæk
19:00	Billeskov 70' (pen.)	Report	Mølvadgaard 2'; Lobzhanidze 25'; Pourié 72', 75'	Referee: Anders Poulsen

2 November 2017	Hobro IK (1)	1–1 (a.e.t.) (4–3 p)	FC Nordsjælland (1)	DS Arena, Hobro
19:00	Grønning 14'	Report	Marcondes 49'	Attendance: 1,013

28 November 2017	Jammerbugt FC (3)	1–4	SønderjyskE (1)	Jetsmark Stadion, Pandrup
15:00	Steffensen 83'	Report	Ekani 13'; Luijckx 24'; Zinckernagel 33'; Gartenmann 90'	Referee: Jakob Kehlet

6 December 2017	AaB (1)	2–1	FC Helsingør (1)	Aalborg Portland Park, Aalborg
18:00	Rolin 90'; Flores 92'	Report	Okore 20' (o.g.)	Referee: Jakob Kehlet

6 December 2017	Silkeborg IF (1)	3–1 (a.e.t.)	Lyngby BK (1)	Ukendt
18:00	Skhirtladze 58'; Nielsen 92'; Petersen 102'	Report	Ørnskov 88'	Referee: Michael Tykgaard

4 February 2018	F.C. Copenhagen (1)	0–1	Brøndby IF (1)	Parken Stadium, Copenhagen
12:30		Report	Wilczek 33'

=== Bracket ===
Quarter-finals
4 April – Randers
Randers FC	1
Silkeborg IF	3
5 April – Haderslev
SønderjyskE	0
Brøndby IF	1
11 April – Fredericia
FC Fredericia	3
AaB	1
12 April – Hobro
Hobro IK	1
FC Midtjylland	2

Semi-finals
25 April – Fredericia
FC Fredericia	0
Silkeborg IF	1
26 April – Brøndby
Brøndby IF	3
FC Midtjylland	1

Final
10 May – Copenhagen
Brøndby IF	3
Silkeborg IF	1

== Quarter-finals ==
Quarter-final matches were played between 4–12 April 2018.

4 April 2018	Randers FC (1)	1–3 (a.e.t.)	Silkeborg IF (1)	BioNutria Park Randers
12:00	Markkanen 10'	Report	Mattsson 41'; Gertsen 107'; Rochester Sørensen 117'	Attendance: 2,292; Referee: Jens Maae

5 April 2018	SønderjyskE (1)	0–1 (a.e.t.)	Brøndby IF (1)	Sydbank Park, Haderslev
12:30		Report	Nørgaard 118'	Attendance: 5,048; Referee: Peter Kjærsgaard-Andersen

11 April 2018	FC Fredericia (2)	3–1	AaB (1)	Monjasa Park, Fredericia
12:00	Høegh 15', 45'; Fazlagic 45'	Report	Børsting 59'	Attendance: 2,466; Referee: Jens Maae

12 April 2018	Hobro IK (1)	1–2 (a.e.t.)	FC Midtjylland (1)	DS Arena, Hobro
12:30	Mikkelsen 109'	Report	Kraev 98', 112'	Attendance: 1,382; Referee: Mads-Kristoffer Kristoffersen

== Semi-finals ==
The two semifinal matches will be played between 24–26 April 2018.

25 April 2018	FC Fredericia (2)	0–1	Silkeborg IF (1)	Monjasa Park, Fredericia
17:30		Report	Fredsted 50' (o.g.)	Attendance: 4,799; Referee: Jens Maae

26 April 2018	Brøndby IF (1)	3–1	FC Midtjylland (1)	Brøndby Stadium, Brøndby
18:30	Wilczek 1', 65'; Pukki 15'	Report	Wikheim 48'	Attendance: 14,794; Referee: Mads-Kristoffer Kristoffersen

== Final ==
10 May 2018
12:00

Brøndby IF (1)	3–1	Silkeborg IF (1)
Röcker 35'; Wilczek 41', 91'	Report	Skhirtladze 33'

Parken Stadium, Copenhagen
Attendance: 31,027
Referee: Anders Poulsen
