= Andreas Kaltoft =

Danish footballer (born 1998)

Personal information
- Date of birth: 22 May 1998 (age 28)
- Place of birth: Hellerup, Denmark
- Height: 1.93 m (6 ft 4 in)
- Position: Centre back

Youth career
- 2002–2011: B 1903
- 2012–2016: B.93
- 2016–2017: Brøndby

Senior career*
Years	Team	Apps	(Gls)
2015–2016	B.93	29	(0)
2017–2021	Vendsyssel	98	(3)
Total		127	(3)

International career
2015–2016	Denmark U17	1	(0)
2016	Denmark U18	4	(1)
2016–2017	Denmark U19	6	(0)
2017–2019	Denmark U20	3	(1)
- * Club domestic league appearances and goals as of 20:15, 2 July 2021 (UTC)

Andreas Kaltoft (born 22 May 1998) is a Danish former professional footballer who played as a defender.

== Club career ==
Kaltoft rose through the ranks of Danish third tier club B.93. On 1 November 2016, he made his debut for the first team at age 16 as a late substitute in the home match against Nykøbing FC which was won 3–2. That made him the youngest player to make a senior debut for B.93 since 1920.

Kaltoft attracted interest from Danish Superliga club Brøndby IF which resulted in him signing onto a youth contract with the team. One year later, Kaltoft was signed by Danish 1st Division team Vendsyssel FF on a deal keeping him in Northern Jutland until 2020. This move reunited him with former teammate Emmanuel Ogude, who he played with in B.93. In the summer of 2018 yet another former B.93 teammate Sebastian Czajowski joined the Northern Jutland team. At the end of his first season with Vendsyssel FF Kaltoft helped the team qualify for the Danish Superliga for the first time and he made his Superliga debut in a match against AaB in June 2018. He scored his first Superliga goal in a 1–1 draw against Hobro IK on 16 September 2018.
