= Mathias Madsen =

Danish footballer (born 2002)

Personal information
- Full name: Mathias Theodor Bladt Madsen
- Date of birth: 10 March 2002 (age 24)
- Place of birth: Brøndby Strand, Denmark
- Height: 1.83 m (6 ft 0 in)
- Position: Left-back

Youth career
- Brøndby Strand IK
- Hedensted
- Horsens

Senior career*
Years	Team	Apps	(Gls)
2018–2021	Horsens	1	(0)
2021–2023	Middelfart	19	(0)

International career
2018–2019	Denmark U17	11	(0)
2019	Denmark U18	2	(0)
- * Club domestic league appearances and goals as of 19:04, 17 July 2023 (UTC)

Mathias Theodor Bladt Madsen (born 10 March 2002) is a Danish football player who plays as left-back.

== Career ==
=== AC Horsens ===
Madsen joined AC Horsens at the age of 12. He was with the first team squad in Málaga, Spain, on training camp at the age of only 15 in January 2018. On 28 February 2018, AC Horsens announced that they had rewarded the player with a three-year contract which included, that he was going to train with the first team squad once a week. Two months later, 21 April 2018, Madsen became the second youngest player in the Danish Superliga history to play, when he made his debut against F.C. Copenhagen. He was 16 years and 46 days old, which was only 8 days older than the youngest debutant ever, Kenneth Zohore, who was 16 years and 35 days old. He came on the pitch for the last couple of minutes, replacing Delphin Tshiembe.

He became a permanent player of the first team squad from the 2018/19 season. Madsen left Horsens at the end of the 2020–21 season, where his contract expired.

=== Middelfart ===
On 28 June 2021, Madsen joined Danish 2nd Division club Middelfart BK, signing a two-year deal. He left the club again in March 2023.
