= Valdemar Sadrifar =

Danish footballer

Personal information
- Date of birth: 9 March 2001 (age 25)
- Place of birth: Aarhus, Denmark
- Height: 1.78 m (5 ft 10 in)
- Position: Left-back

Team information
- Current team: BFC Dynamo
- Number: 7

Youth career
- 2016–2017: AGF
- 2017–2021: Vejle

Senior career*
Years	Team	Apps	(Gls)
2020	→ Sydvest 05 (loan)	2	(0)
2021–2022	Vejle	1	(0)
2022	Hedensted		
2022	Manhattan SC	7	(2)
2022	Hedensted		
2022–2023	Rostocker FC	27	(4)
2023–2025	Phönix Lübeck	39	(7)
2025–	BFC Dynamo	15	(2)
- * Club domestic league appearances and goals as of 23 September 2026

Valdemar Sadrifar (Persian: والدمار صدری فر; born 9 March 2001) is a Danish footballer who plays as a left-back for German Regionalliga Nordost club BFC Dynamo.

== Club career ==
Sadrifar made his Danish Superliga debut for Vejle on 18 July 2021 against Randers.

He joined Manhattan SC in USL League Two for the 2022 season, scoring a goal on his debut on 25 May 2022 against FC Motown.

On 13 July 2023, Sadrifar joined Regionalliga club 1. FC Phönix Lübeck, on a contract until 30 June 2025.

== Personal life ==
Sadrifar was born in Aarhus to a Danish mother and an Iranian father.

== Career statistics ==
=== Club ===
As of 24 August 2021

Appearances and goals by club, season and competition
Club	Season	League			National Cup		Other		Total	
Club	Season	Division	Apps	Goals	Apps	Goals	Apps	Goals	Apps	Goals
Sydvest 05	2020–21	Danish 2nd Division	2	0	0	0	—		2	0
Vejle	2021–22	Danish Superliga	1	0	0	0	—		1	0
Career total			3	0	0	0	—		3	0
