= Emmanuel Ogude =

Nigerian footballer (born 1994)

Personal information
- Full name: Emmanuel Ifeanyi Ogude
- Date of birth: 29 March 1994 (age 32)
- Place of birth: Lagos, Nigeria
- Height: 1.80 m (5 ft 11 in)
- Position: Forward

Team information
- Current team: Nykøbing
- Number: 16

Senior career*
Years	Team	Apps	(Gls)
2013–2014	Maccabi Petah Tikva	18	(1)
2014	Hapoel Ashkelon	13	(3)
2014–2015	Maccabi Kiryat Gat	13	(1)
2015–2017	B.93	26	(12)
2017–2020	Vendsyssel	82	(17)
2020–2021	Al Tadhamon	?	(3)
2021–2022	Lobi Stars	27	(6)
2022–2024	B.93	29	(5)
2024	Al-Qasim	?	(2)
2024	VPS	7	(0)
2024	VPS II	1	(2)
2025–	Nykøbing	49	(26)

International career
2010	Nigeria U17		
- * Club domestic league appearances and goals as of 3 October 2026

Emmanuel Ifeanyi Ogude (born 29 March 1993) is a Nigerian professional footballer who plays as a forward for Danish 2nd Division side Nykøbing.

== Club career ==
=== B.93 ===
Ogude signed a contract with Danish third tier B.93 in December 2015, at the age of 21, after playing in Israel for a few years. His debut for the first team was as a substitute against B1908 on 24 March 2016, a game which B.93 won 3–1.

After being awarded the title of Player of the Year in the Danish third tier, Ogude attracted interest from Danish Superliga club Brøndby IF which resulted in a tryout.

=== Vendsyssel ===
On 7 July 2017, Ogude signed for Danish second tier club Vendsyssel FF on a three-year deal. He made his debut for Vendsyssel in a league match on 30 July 2017 against Fremad Amager, where he came on as a late substitute for Jeppe Illum. His first season at the club resulted in promotion to the Superliga. Ogude ended the season with 27 appearances in which he scored 10 goals.

Ogude made his first appearance at the highest Danish level on 15 July 2018, as a 82nd-minute substitute for Sebastian Czajkowski as Vendsyssel won 3–2 home over OB. He scored his first goal at the highest level from a penalty kick on 26 August in a 1–2 home loss to Brøndby IF. The penalty resulted in a controversial situation, where opposing supporters from Brøndby threw a football on the field with the intention of flinching Ogude at the moment of shooting. Ogude himself explained that he did not notice the episode, but that a lighter was thrown at him from the opposing fans. The incident resulted in a fine of 25,000 DKK for Brøndby. On 5 September, Ogude scored six goals as Vendsyssel crushed Danish sixth tier side Egen UI with a total score of 9–1. He finished the season with 27 appearances in which he scored nine goals, as Vendsyssel suffered relegation after one year at the highest level. The club confirmed on 12 August 2020, that Ogude had left the club.

=== Al Tadhamon ===
In September 2020, Ogude signed with Kuwait Premier League club Al Tadhamon. In the summer of 2021, Ogude tore his anterior cruciate ligament. His contract was not extended, making him a free agent in July 2021.

=== Return to B.93 ===
In March 2022, Ogude returned to B.93. On 1 February 2024 the club confirmed, that Oguda had left by mutual agreement.

=== VPS ===
After a short stint with Al-Qasim in Iraq Stars League, on 19 August 2024, Ogude signed with Finnish Veikkausliiga club Vaasan Palloseura (VPS) for the rest of the 2024 season.

=== Nykøbing FC ===
On 22 March 2025, Ogude joined Danish 2nd Division side Nykøbing FC on a deal until June 2026.

== Career statistics ==
As of 24 March 2025

Appearances and goals by club, season and competition
Club	Season	League			Cup (Note: Includes Israel State Cup and Danish Cup)		Other		Total	
Club	Season	Division	Apps	Goals	Apps	Goals	Apps	Goals	Apps	Goals
Maccabi Petah Tikva	2013–14	Israeli Premier League	18	1	0	0	–		18	1
Hapoel Ashkelon	2013–14	Liga Leumit	13	3	–		–		13	3
Maccabi Kiryat Gat	2014–15	Liga Leumit	13	1	–		–		13	1
B.93	2016–17	Danish 2nd Division	26	12	4	1	–		30	13
Vendsyssel FF	2017–18	Danish 1st Division	27	10	2	1	–		29	11
Vendsyssel FF	2018–19	Danish Superliga	26	3	4	6	–		30	9
Vendsyssel FF	2019–20	Danish 1st Division	29	4	3	4	–		32	8
Vendsyssel FF	Total		82	17	9	11	0	0	91	28
Al Tadhamon	2020–21	Kuwait Premier League		3	–		–			3
Lobi Stars	2021–22	NPFL	27	6	–		–		27	6
B.93	2022–23	Danish 2nd Division	18	4	–		–		18	4
B.93	2023–24	Danish 1st Division	11	1	2	1	–		13	2
B.93	Total		29	5	2	1	0	0	31	6
Al-Qasim	2023–24	Iraq Stars League		2	–		–			2
VPS	2024	Veikkausliiga	7	0	–		–		7	0
VPS Akatemia	2024	Kolmonen	1	2	–		–		1	2
Nykøbing FC	2024–25	Danish 2nd Division	0	0	0	0	–		0	0
Career total			216	52	15	13	0	0	231	65

== Honours ==
Nykøbing

- Danish 3rd Division: 2025–26

Individual

- Danish 3rd Division top goalscorer: 2025–26
