= Jeppe Gertsen =

Danish footballer (born 1997)

Personal information
- Date of birth: 9 February 1997 (age 29)
- Place of birth: Aarhus, Denmark
- Height: 1.88 m (6 ft 2 in)
- Position: Centre-back

Team information
- Current team: Næstved (on loan from AB)
- Number: 3

Youth career
- –2009: AGF
- 2009–2016: Silkeborg

Senior career*
Years	Team	Apps	(Gls)
2016–2021	Silkeborg	28	(1)
2021–2024	Fredericia	62	(3)
2024	Vestri	17	(3)
2025	Næstved	11	(1)
2025–	AB	13	(0)
2026–	→ Næstved (loan)	9	(1)
- * Club domestic league appearances and goals as of 3 October 2026

Jeppe Gertsen (born 9 February 1997) is a Danish professional footballer who plays as a centre-back for Danish 2nd Division side Næstved, on loan from AB.

== Club career ==
=== Youth years ===
Born in Aarhus, Gertsen started out in the youth team of AGF before joining Silkeborg IF in 2009, initially with the under-13 team. He gradually ascended up the ranks during his teenage years, while simultaneously studying at Silkeborg Gymnasium, which he completed in 2017. In the summer of 2015, while a part of the under-19 squad, his contract was extended for three more years. It also was around this time that he started training with the first team on occasion. He appeared on the substitution bench for the senior squad a total of eight times during the 2015–16 and 2016–17 seasons.

=== Professional career ===
Gertsen made his first-team debut on 19 September 2017, playing the full 90 minutes of a second-round Danish Cup match against Kjellerup.

He made his Superliga debut on 10 December 2017, replacing Davit Skhirtladze in the final minutes of a 2–1 victory over Odense. The next month, Silkeborg signed him to a three-year contract extension, securing him until the summer of 2021.

On 28 January 2021, Gertsen signed a pre-contract with FC Fredericia, valid from 1 July 2021, where his contract with Silkeborg also expired. On 16 January 2024 FC Fredericia confirmed that Geertsen had left the club by mutual agreement, a year and a half early.

On 3 February 2024, Gertsen joined Icelandic club Vestri. He left the club again at the end of the year.

On March 19, 2025, Gertsen joined Danish 2nd Division side Næstved Boldklub. At the end of June, Gertsen moved to fellow league club AB on a deal until June 2028.
