= 2016–17 Danish 2nd Divisions =

Danish 2nd Divisions
- Season: 2016–17

The 2016–17 Danish 2nd Divisions was divided in three groups of eight teams in the autumn. In spring there was a promotion play-off and a relegation play-off. The top two teams of the promotion play-off group were promoted to the 2017–18 Danish 1st Division.

IK Skovbakken merged with Vejlby IK as of 1 July 2016 to form VSK Aarhus.

== Participants ==
Locations of the 2016–17 Danish 2nd Division teams (Group 1 in red, Group 2 in green, Group 3 in blue). Copenhagen teams: Avarta, B.93, Brønshøj Boldklub, Frem, HIK, and Hvidovre

Club	Group	Finishing position last season	First season of current spell in 2nd Divisions
Aarhus Fremad	Group 3	8th	2015–16
Avarta	Group 1	14th	2008–09
B.93	Group 1	13th	2013–14
Brabrand	Group 3	5th	2010–11
Brønshøj Boldklub	Group 1	6th	2015–16
Dalum IF	Group 2	16th	2015–16
FC Svendborg	Group 2	21st	2008–09
FC Sydvest 05	Group 2	1st in Denmark Series Group 2	2016–17
Fredensborg BI	Group 1	1st in Denmark Series Group 1	2016–17
Frem	Group 1	4th	2012–13
Greve	Group 2	2nd in Denmark Series Group 2	2016–17
HIK	Group 1	10th	2008–09
Holbæk	Group 1	20th	2009–10
Hvidovre	Group 1	9th	2014–15
Jammerbugt FC	Group 3	22nd	2012–13
Kjellerup	Group 3	1st in Denmark Series Group 3	2016–17
Kolding IF	Group 2	19th	2014–15
Marienlyst	Group 2	11th	2014–15
Middelfart	Group 2	12th	2012–13
Næsby	Group 2	17th	2004–05
Odder	Group 3	15th	2013–14
Thisted	Group 3	7th	2010–11
Vejgaard	Group 3	2nd in Denmark Series Group 3	2016–17
VSK Aarhus	Group 3	18th	2010–11

== Group 1 ==
=== League table ===
Pos	Team	Pld	W	D	L	GF	GA	GD	Pts	Promotion or Relegation
1	BK Avarta	14	8	5	1	25	12	+13	29	Qualification to Promotion Group
2	Hvidovre IF	14	7	5	2	23	14	+9	26	Qualification to Promotion Group
3	B.93	14	7	2	5	20	17	+3	23	Qualification to Promotion Group
4	Brønshøj Boldklub	14	6	4	4	22	17	+5	22	Qualification to Promotion Group
5	BK Frem	14	6	4	4	21	17	+4	22	Qualification to Relegation Group
6	Fredensborg BI	14	4	2	8	12	24	−12	14	Qualification to Relegation Group
7	HIK	14	4	0	10	18	28	−10	12	Qualification to Relegation Group
8	Holbæk B&I	14	1	4	9	17	29	−12	7	Qualification to Relegation Group

Updated to match(es) played on 5 November 2016. Source: Danish FA
Rules for classification: 1) points; 2) goal difference; 3) number of goals scored

== Group 2 ==
=== League table ===
Pos	Team	Pld	W	D	L	GF	GA	GD	Pts	Promotion or Relegation
1	Kolding IF	14	9	1	4	37	24	+13	28	Qualification to Promotion Group
2	Dalum IF	14	5	6	3	18	16	+2	21	Qualification to Promotion Group
3	Greve Fodbold	14	5	5	4	16	14	+2	20	Qualification to Promotion Group
4	BK Marienlyst	14	5	4	5	15	15	0	19	Qualification to Promotion Group
5	Næsby BK	14	5	2	7	17	25	−8	17	Qualification to Relegation Group
6	FC Sydvest 05	14	4	3	7	24	27	−3	15	Qualification to Relegation Group
7	Middelfart G&BK (Note: Middelfart G&BK was deducted twelve points for paying salaries to amateur players.)	14	7	4	3	26	20	+6	13	Qualification to Relegation Group
8	FC Svendborg	14	2	3	9	14	26	−12	9	Qualification to Relegation Group

Updated to match(es) played on 5 November 2016. Source: Danish FA
Rules for classification: 1) points; 2) goal difference; 3) number of goals scored

== Group 3 ==
=== League table ===
Pos	Team	Pld	W	D	L	GF	GA	GD	Pts	Promotion or Relegation
1	Brabrand IF	14	10	4	0	29	9	+20	34	Qualification to Promotion Group
2	Thisted FC	14	9	3	2	27	14	+13	30	Qualification to Promotion Group
3	Kjellerup IF	14	7	3	4	29	22	+7	24	Qualification to Promotion Group
4	Aarhus Fremad	14	6	2	6	27	30	−3	20	Qualification to Promotion Group
5	Odder IGF	14	4	5	5	19	25	−6	17	Qualification to Relegation Group
6	VSK Aarhus	14	2	5	7	19	27	−8	11	Qualification to Relegation Group
7	Jammerbugt FC	14	3	2	9	20	29	−9	11	Qualification to Relegation Group
8	Vejgaard BK	14	1	4	9	16	30	−14	7	Qualification to Relegation Group

Updated to match(es) played on 5 November 2016. Source: Danish FA
Rules for classification: 1) points; 2) goal difference; 3) number of goals scored

== Promotion Group ==
=== League table ===
The top 4 teams from each group competed for 2 spots in the 2017–18 Danish 1st Division. The points and goals that the teams won in the autumn group against other participants in the promotion group were transferred to the promotion group.

Pos	Team	Pld	W	D	L	GF	GA	GD	Pts	Promotion or relegation
1	Thisted FC (P)	22	16	4	2	48	15	+33	52	Promotion to 2017–18 Danish 1st Division
2	Brabrand IF (P)	22	11	8	3	44	21	+23	41	Promotion to 2017–18 Danish 1st Division
3	Kolding IF	22	12	4	6	42	24	+18	40	
4	BK Avarta	22	10	7	5	38	24	+14	37	
5	B.93	22	11	2	9	33	28	+5	35	
6	Kjellerup IF	22	8	5	9	41	38	+3	29	
7	Brønshøj Boldklub	22	8	3	11	30	41	−11	27	
8	BK Marienlyst	22	7	5	10	28	37	−9	26	
9	Aarhus Fremad	22	7	3	12	25	38	−13	24	
10	Hvidovre IF	22	5	7	10	23	34	−11	22	
11	Dalum IF	22	4	6	12	18	41	−23	18	
12	Greve Fodbold	22	4	4	14	19	48	−29	16	

Updated to match(es) played on 10 June 2017. Source: Danish FA
Rules for classification: 1) points; 2) goal difference; 3) number of goals scored
(P) Promoted

== Relegation Group ==
=== League table ===
The bottom 4 teams from each group competed to avoid the 4 relegations spots to the Denmark Series. The points and goals that the teams won in the autumn group against other participants in the relegation group were transferred to the relegation group.

Pos	Team	Pld	W	D	L	GF	GA	GD	Pts	Promotion or relegation
1	Middelfart G&BK	22	17	2	3	43	18	+25	53	
2	BK Frem	22	10	6	6	31	25	+6	36	
3	Næsby BK	22	10	5	7	30	33	−3	35	
4	FC Sydvest 05	22	9	7	6	34	30	+4	34	
5	VSK Aarhus	22	8	9	5	35	30	+5	33	
6	Odder IGF (Note: Odder IGF was deducted six points for paying salaries to amateur players.)	22	10	5	7	37	29	+8	29	
7	HIK	22	9	2	11	33	31	+2	29	
8	Jammerbugt FC	22	8	5	9	31	31	0	29	
9	Holbæk B&I (R)	22	7	4	11	30	35	−5	25	Relegation to Denmark Series
10	FC Svendborg (R)	22	6	5	11	25	35	−10	23	Relegation to Denmark Series
11	Vejgaard BK (R)	22	4	5	13	23	37	−14	17	Relegation to Denmark Series
12	Fredensborg BI (R)	22	3	7	12	17	35	−18	16	Relegation to Denmark Series

Updated to match(es) played on 17 June 2017. Source: Danish FA
Rules for classification: 1) points; 2) goal difference; 3) number of goals scored
(R) Relegated
