= Ledøje-Smørum Fodbold =

Danish football club

- Full name: Ledøje-Smørum Fodbold
- Founded: 1 June 1911; 114 years ago
- Ground: Sydbank Arena; Smørumnedre
- Capacity: 1,000
- League: Denmark Series (V)
- Website: lsf.dk
Home colours

Ledøje-Smørum Fodbold (LSF, Danish pronunciation: [ˈle̝ðˌʌjə ˈsmɶːʁɔm ˈfoðˌpʌlˀt]) is an association football club based in the town of Smørumnedre, Denmark. Founded in 1911, the club play at their home ground Smørum Park. Their colours are white and black. Ledøje-Smørum is affiliated to the local football association, DBU Zealand. The football department is part of the larger sports club, Ledøje-Smørum Idrætsforening, but operates as its own independent unit with their own board of representatives.

== History ==
Smørum Boldklub was founded in June 1911 and, by the mid-1910s, was fielding a competitive side in tournaments organised by the Sjællands Boldspil-Union (SBU), the regional branch of the Danish Football Union (DBU). Early home matches were played on makeshift pitches in and around Smørum, including land near Flodvej and later a field south of Skebjergvej, reflecting limited facilities and a largely volunteer-run setup.

Organised first-team football faltered in the early 1930s and ceased after 1933, in part as nearby Måløv Boldklub grew more structured following its establishment in 1935. Unofficial summer matches continued locally during the decade, and the club was revived after the end of the Danish occupation in 1945 under the leadership of Aage Olsen, who rebuilt youth and senior teams. Persistent ground issues meant the side alternated between sub-standard fields at Smørumovre and, later, a farmer's field in Lille Smørum, both without basic amenities.

Municipal support gradually improved conditions in the 1950s. A new pitch was laid near the planned Central School (later Søagerskolen), with changing facilities added in 1959. Governance remained fluid: in 1953 a breakaway, Ledøje Smørum Idrætsforening, formed amid concerns over organisation. The two clubs competed for players until agreeing to merge in 1955 as Ledøje-Smørum Boldklub, consolidating senior and youth football under one banner.

From the mid-1950s the club operated within a broader local sports framework. A joint sports committee was created in March 1955 to coordinate resources across football and two local rifle associations. This evolved into a formal umbrella body on 20 May 1963: Ledøje-Smørum Skytte- og Idrætsforening (LSSI), with football as a self-governing department. The new structure enabled sustained investment in facilities, including the acquisition of land from Ormegården in 1965, the opening of two enclosed pitches in August 1968, the inauguration of the Ledøje-Smørum sports arena in January 1972, and subsequent expansions of changing rooms and training areas between 1976 and 1979. A second training arena followed in 1985, anchoring the club's long-term player pathway and first-team operations in the municipality.

On the field, the first team alternated between the regional Zealand Series and the national Denmark Series within the modern pyramid. In the 2017–18 third round, LSF faced Brøndby IF and lost 5–1 after having led 1–0 through Emil Scott Rasmussen following a goalkeeping error by Benjamin Bellot. The following season they again reached the third round, exiting 1–2 to Hobro after two second-half goals by Vito Hammershøy-Mistrati. Following the introduction of the national 3rd Division in 2021–22, LSF featured in the restructured Denmark Series. In the 2025–26 first round they eliminated BK Frem on penalties after a 0–0 draw, before drawing 1–1 with Lyngby Boldklub and losing 6–5 in a shoot-out in the second round at Sydbank Arena.

Off the pitch, in July 2023, the club appointed Anders Bjerregaard—former Brøndby IF sporting director and son of founder Per Bjerregaard—as club director.
