= Anders Kaagh =

Danish footballer (born 1986)

Personal information
- Date of birth: 18 July 1986 (age 40)
- Place of birth: Grenaa, Denmark
- Position: Forward

Youth career
- 19XX–2000: Grenaa IF
- 2000–2003: AGF

Senior career*
Years	Team	Apps	(Gls)
2004	AGF	4	(1)
2004	Viborg FF	4	(0)
2005–2007	AGF	16	(3)
2007	→ Mandalskameratene (loan)	13	(1)
2007	Þróttur		
2008–2010	FC Djursland		
2010	Stenløse		
2011–2012	Herlev		
2012–2014	HB Køge	58	(21)
2014–2016	Vejle	38	(6)
2016–2018	Fremad Amager	44	(4)
- * Club domestic league appearances and goals

Anders Kaagh (born 18 July 1986) is a Danish retired footballer. He has previous represented Aarhus GF, Viborg FF, FC Djursland, Stenløse, Herlev IF and HB Køge.

Kaagh was loaned out to the Norwegian club Mandalskameratene in the first half of the 2007 season and scored one goal in 13 matches for the club in the Norwegian First Division.

He signed a contract with HB Køge on 10 July 2012.

On June 28 Vejle Boldklub announced that they had signed a contract with Anders Kaagh, joining the club on Monday, June 30, 2014.

He is the twin brother of Kristian Kaagh, who is also a football player.
