= Sebastian Czajkowski =

Danish footballer (born 1996)

Personal information
- Date of birth: 15 September 1996 (age 30)
- Place of birth: Copenhagen, Denmark
- Height: 1.80 m (5 ft 11 in)
- Position: Forward

Youth career
- 2002–2013: B1908
- 2013–2014: B.93

Senior career*
Years	Team	Apps	(Gls)
2014–2018	B.93	62	(22)
2018–2019	Vendsyssel	21	(2)
2020	Roskilde	12	(3)
2020–2021	Helsingør	26	(11)
Total		121	(38)

International career
2014	Denmark U18	3	(0)
- * Club domestic league appearances and goals

Sebastian Czajkowski (Danish pronunciation: [se̝ˈpæstjæn tɕɑjˈkʰʌwski]; born 15 September 1996) is a Danish former professional footballer who played as a forward. Born in Denmark, Czajkowski is of Polish descent.

== Career ==
=== Early years ===
Czajkowski grew up on the island of Amager, part of Copenhagen, and started playing football for B1908 as a six-year-old before joining B.93 at age 17. As a 17-year old, Czajkowski made his first team debut for B.93 in the spring 2014. He made a total of four appearances in the spring of 2014, the first three from the bench. Czajkowski left the club in the summer 2018 after scoring 24 goals in 67 games.

=== Vendsyssel ===
On 9 February 2018, it was announced that Czajkowski was signed by Vendsyssel FF, with him joining the team from the start of the 2018–19 season. The club reached promotion to the Danish Superliga ahead of the season. He immediately made an impact, scoring in his debut for the club on 16 July 2018 in a 3–2 win over OB, which was also Vendsyssel's first goal in the Danish Superliga. He suffered a shoulder injury later in the season, which required surgery, sidelining him from February 2019 until the end of the season. Czajkowski finished his first season with Vendsyssel with 13 appearances in which he scored two goals, as the club suffered relegation to the second-tier Danish 1st Division.

In his second season with the club, Czajkowski was mostly a reserve and his contract was terminated by mutual consent on 2 December 2019. He made 19 appearances for the club, scoring two goals.

=== Roskilde ===
On 13 January 2020, Czajkowski joined Danish 1st Division club FC Roskilde. He made 12 appearances for the club during his stint there, in which he scored three goals.

=== Helsingør ===
After Roskilde had suffered relegation to the Danish 2nd Division, Czajkowski moved to newly promoted Danish 1st Division club FC Helsingør on 13 August 2020. He made his league debut on 9 September in a 4–2 home game against Silkeborg, in which he also scored his first goal for the club. He suffered a strained muscle in September, which sidelined him for a number of games. He returned for the match against Kolding IF on 24 October, coming on as a second-half substitute in a 0–0 draw. On 21 December, Czajkowski and fellow Helsingør-player Mathias Christensen tested positive for SARS-CoV-2 during the COVID-19 pandemic.

On 10 December 2021, 25-year old Czajkowski announced his retirement in order for him to prioritise his family, and due to many serious injuries through his career.

== Personal life ==
Czajkowski's parents are immigrants from Poland and therefore, Czajkowski holds both a Danish and a Polish passport. He lives with his wife Camille on Amager. In December 2020, she gave birth to their son Felix.
