= Lystrup IF =

Danish football club

- Full name: Lystrup Idrætsforening
- Nickname(s): LIF
- Founded: 20 February 1934; 91 years ago
- Ground: Lystrup Idrætsanlæg; Lystrup, Aarhus
- Capacity: 200
- League: DBU Jyllands Serie 3
- Website: http://www.lystrupfodbold.dk
Home colours

Lystrup Idrætsforening is a Danish association football club currently playing in the DBU Jyllands Serie 3, one of the ninth tiers of Danish football. They play at Lystrup Idrætsanlæg in Lystrup, East Jutland.

== History ==
=== Founding and early decades ===
Lystrup Idrætsforening was founded on 10 February 1934. However, there is some uncertainty about the exact date, which may ascribed to the fact that other sports activities were exerted in the area before that year. In the 1920s, two clubs were located in the area: Lystrup-Elsted Idrætsforening and Lystrup Boldklub, who would both be disbanded.

Co-founder and first chairman of Lystrup Idrætsforening, or Lystrup IF in short, was N.J. Nielsen. During the first years of existence, association football was the only sports department in the club, but gymnastics and badminton would soon join. In the 1930s, the club at one point changed its name to "L.B.", either referring to a "Lystrup Boldklub" or "Lystrup Badmintonklub".

Until 1950, Lystrup IF had its training facilities on the fields surrounding the town, after which grass pitches were installed. In 1969, another pitch and a clubhouse were constructed by Lystrup Enge, which provided a new home ground for the club. A gym, Lystruphallen, was built in 1973, and in the following year Lisbjerg IF joined Lystrup IF.

=== Recent years ===
In 2013–14, Lystrup IF reached promotion to the Denmark Series, the fourth highest level of Danish football. The following season, the club reached the third round of the Danish Cup, in which they were knocked out by Danish Superliga club AaB, after forfeiting their home advantage. The match ended 0–4.

==== Smukfest incident (2019) ====
In August 2019, Lystrup IF reached national Danish media following an incident, which involved first-team players attending Smukfest, an annual music festival, meaning that Lystrup were forced to forfeit their Danish Cup matchup against Skive IK. After facing pressure from Divisionsforeningen, representing the Danish divisions, and criticism from Skive's director of football, Rasmus Brandhof, Lystrup head coach John Stoltze Madsen stated that he simply did not have enough players available to compete. Club chairman Susanne Pedersen later explained that Smukfest was not the reason for players cancelling the cup match, but that the main reason was the club's relegation from the Denmark Series to the Jutland Series, which had seen many players leave the club during the summer. The following day, Lystrup announced that a mixture of first-team and veteran's team footballers could form a competitive team, which meant that cancellation was avoided. The match was played on 8 August, and ended in a 16–1 loss to Lystrup. It is tied with BK Pioneren's 16–1 defeat by Brøndby in 1982 as the biggest defeat ever in the Danish Cup.

In the subsequent years, Lystrup experienced a historic decline, culminating in becoming the poorest-performing team in the history of the Jutland Series and suffering another relegation in 2019. Following successive demotions, they were relegated to the ninth-tier league, DBU Jyllands Serie 3, by 2024.
