= Jeppe Illum =

Danish footballer (born 1992)

Personal information
- Full name: Jeppe Illum
- Date of birth: 25 March 1992 (age 34)
- Place of birth: Denmark
- Height: 1.86 m (6 ft 1 in)
- Position: Forward

Youth career
- Karrebæk IF
- HG
- Næstved
- 2009–2011: Silkeborg

Senior career*
Years	Team	Apps	(Gls)
2011–2016	Silkeborg	97	(8)
2016–2017	Næstved	30	(10)
2017–2019	Vendsyssel	32	(5)
2019	→ Næstved (loan)	0	(0)
2019	→ FC Roskilde (loan)	7	(1)
2019	Arendal	10	(3)
2020–2023	Holbæk B&I		
2023	Brønshøj		

International career
2011–2012	Denmark U20	4	(0)
2013–2014	Denmark U21	4	(2)
- * Club domestic league appearances and goals as of 16:30, 13 January 2020 (UTC)

Jeppe Illum (born 25 March 1992) is a Danish footballer.

== Career ==
Illum joined Vendsyssel in the summer 2017. On 31 January 2019, he was loaned out to Næstved BK in the Danish 1st Division. However, he did not become eligible to play for the club because they didn't got his license registered in time. Therefore, he moved to FC Roskilde on 7 April 2019, also on loan for the rest of the season.

He was signed by Arendal Fotball in the autumn of 2019, but was not retained after the 2019 season. In 2020, he began training with Danish 2nd Division club Holbæk B&I while waiting for an offer from a Norwegian club. However, the offer never came, and he ended up signing a short deal with Holbæk on 18 June 2020 for the rest of the season. He lef the club in July 2023.

In September 2023, Illum joined Brønshøj Boldklub.
