= Tårnby FF =

Association football club in Vestamager, Denmark

- Full name: Tårnby Fodbold Forening
- Short name: TFF
- Founded: 29 October 2004; 21 years ago
- Ground: Vestamager Idrætsanlæg, Vestamager
- Capacity: 1,000 (75 seated)
- Chairman: Henrik Sørensen
- Head coach: Timos Adraktas
- League: Denmark Series
- 2023–24: Denmark Series, Group 1, 3rd of 10
- Website: https://www.taarnbyff.dk/
Home colours	Away colours

Tårnby Fodbold Forening (Danish pronunciation: [ˈtsʰɒˀnˌpyˀ]; commonly known as Tårnby FF), is a Danish association football club based in Vestamager, Copenhagen, Denmark, that competes in the Denmark Series, the fifth tier of the Danish football league system. Founded in 2004, the club is affiliated to DBU Copenhagen. The team plays its home matches at Vestamager Idrætsanlæg, where it has been based since its foundation.

== History ==
=== Formation ===
The club was founded on 29 October 2004 as a breakaway club by a group of former members of Tårnby Boldklub, who on the lower ranked senior teams felt overlooked due to the club's strong focus on youth football and the then superstructure project Amager United. Virtually the entire Tårnby Boldklub Series 3 (eight tier) team – as well as a number of players from other teams – moved to the newly formed club, which was founded with the aim of combining a good social cohesion with sporting results.

The club was admitted as a football club in Københavns Boldspil-Union (KBU) and Københavns Fodbold-Dommerklub (KFD) on 20 January 2005. The new football club had no facilities to offer members from the start, but was awarded its first home ground at Kløvermarkens Idrætsanlæg. However, there was no opportunity for football training, which only consisted of a run on a circuit with start and finish at Kastrup Swimming Pool, where the players also had their dressing rooms. Only when it became recognised as an official club by Tårnby Municipality on 11 March 2005, the new team was allocated to Pilegårdsskolen's pitch with smaller club room, which would later become known as Grotten ("the cave") available in the northwestern section of the school. The club room was renovated during the winter break before the 2006 season with tables, couches, various entertainment and a small room for clothes and equipment.

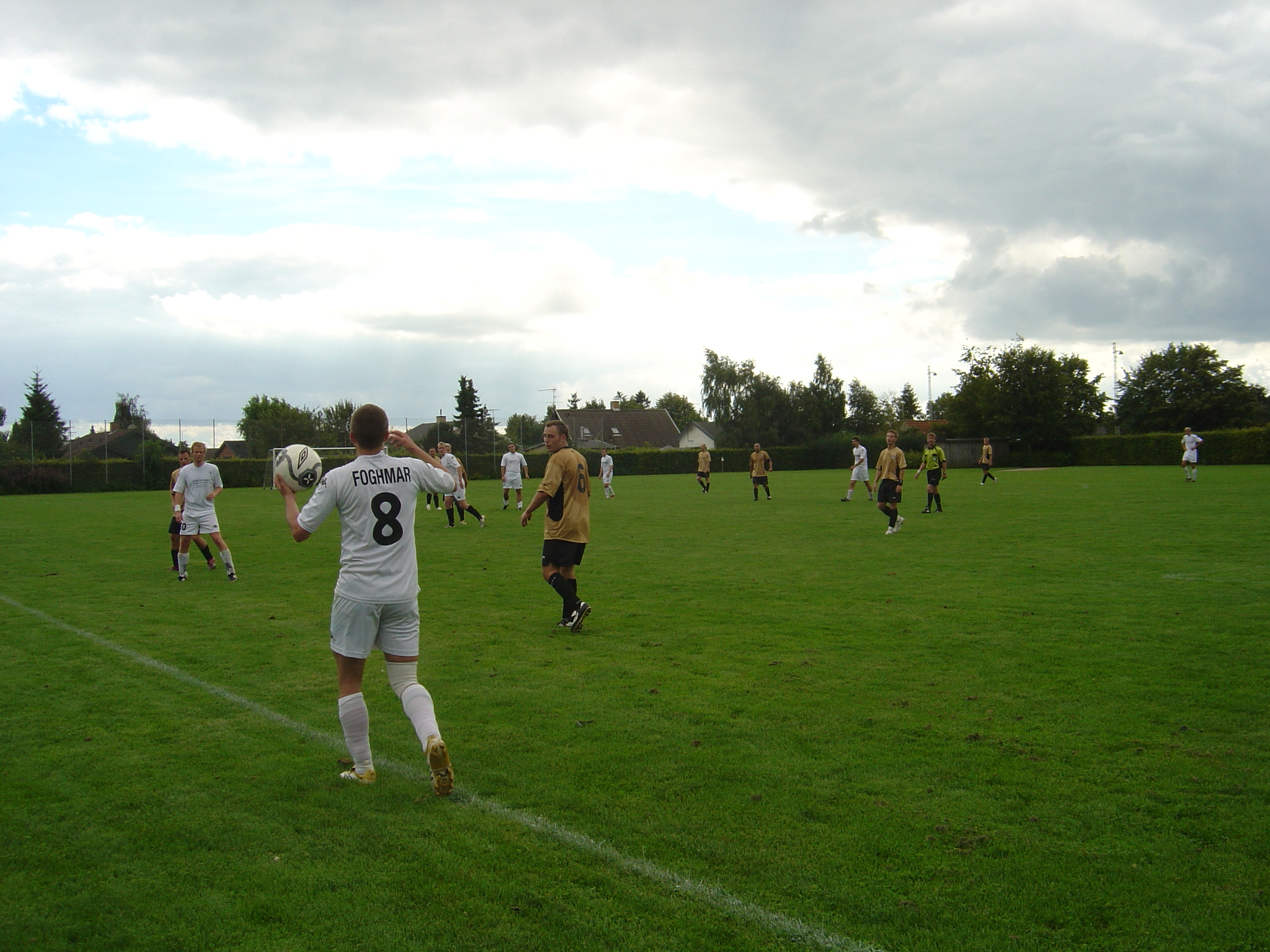
Tårnby FF in a Series 2 match against Olympia ÅK in August 2007 at the former home ground at Pilegårdsskolen.

After the difficult start-up phase, where i.a. the club's new home ground was closed for the winter during a period, the club its inaugural season in the ninth tier KBU Series 4 in a group consisting exclusively of first teams. The club's first official competitive match was played on 3 April 2005. Kløvermarkens Idrætsanlæg hosted the match as a temporary home ground, against FC Pharma which ended in a 7–0 win in front of 41 spectators. The club's official new home ground was inaugurated on 18 April with a 4–4 draw against FC Nanoq, where a Tårnby FF player received a yellow card for the first time. In the first season, a spectator record was set at home with 68 spectators in a match against Club Wowern on 4 May – a record that still stood at the end of 2006. The club's first defeat occurred on 9 September in a match against FC Pharma, which was lost by the numbers 4–0.

In the club's first season, chairman Kristian Pedersen primarily served as the head coach and has later also took over the coaching duty briefly in connection with a suspension for the coach. Before the start of the 2006 season, however, the club's board hired a paid coach to optimise training and ensure another promotion. The club's first coach was René Christensen, who was picked up from a coaching job at Førslev IF. The club's first team promoted twice in its first two seasons and membership constantly increased during the first two years, which meant that in 2006, the club established a second team and later a third team. On 1 March 2007, the club reached 120 members. During the 2006–07 winter break, a new coach was hired, Martin Fischer, who came from Skovlunde IF.

=== Promotion to fourth tier and Bendtner (2019–present) ===
On 17 June 2019, Tårnby FF reached promotion to the fourth tier Denmark Series after a 0–0 draw against RB 1906. They had finished second in the Zealand Series before the decisive qualifying match.

Tårnby FF reached national news after they announced that former Arsenal and Denmark national team star Nicklas Bendtner had signed up for the club, where he would become part of the "M+32 Old Boys" team. On Bendtner joining the team, organiser of the M+32 team, Martin Skov Hæstrup stated that "[w]e are very happy that Nicklas wants to stay in shape with some of the guys he has known for many years. This opportunity is something we have been discussing for many years."
