= Hedensted IF =

Danish football club

- Full name: Hedensted Idrætsforening
- Founded: 1928; 97 years ago
- Ground: Hedensted Stadion; Hedensted; Denmark
- Chairman: Per Holm
- Manager: Kenneth Qvist
- League: Denmark Series
- 2024–25: Denmark Series Group 3, 3rd of 10; Promotion group West, 3rd of 10
- Website: hedenstedif.dk
colours

Hedensted Idrætsforening is a Danish football club based in Hedensted. It was founded in 1928, and its first team competed in the Denmark Series, the fifth tier of the Danish football league system. The club is a part of the DBU Jutland regional association.

Hedensted IF has more than 800 paying members, making it one of the largest sports clubs in Jutland and Denmark as a whole.

== History ==
Founded in 1928 by I.S. Hüttel and E. Bjørnmose, who with a single used ball established the club on a rented field with a membership fee of DKK 1 per season, Hedensted IF grew into a staple of the local community. Its 75th anniversary was celebrated with a match against Vejle Boldklub, which was lost 10–0 as 400 spectators were present.

There are six senior teams in the club. Today the first team competes in the Denmark Series under the leadership of coaches Kasper Adelfred and Brian Rasmussen, the latter having played professionally for Vejle Boldklub, B 1903 and FC Copenhagen.

The biggest match in Hedensted IF's history was against Lyngby Boldklub at home in the third round of the 2017–18 Danish Cup – the first time in club history that they played a competitive match against a club from the top tier Danish Superliga. The match ended with Hedensted being knocked out of the cup with the result 1–3. Three years later, on 12 October 2020, Hedensted managed to knock out second-tier Danish 1st Division club Viborg FF in the second round of the cup, winning 3–1. They eventually lost 1–5 in the following round to Fremad Amager – the club's first loss of the year, as they led their Denmark Series group.
