= Fredensborg BI =

Danish football club

- Full name: Fredensborg Boldklub og Idrætsforening
- Founded: 6 June 1908
- Stadium: Fredensborg Stadion
- Capacity: 2,000 (100 seats)
- Chairman: Lars Jespersen
- Manager: Kasper Jørgensen
- League: Denmark Series
- 2023–24: Zealand Series Group 1, 1st of 14 (promoted)
Home colours	Away colours

Fredensborg Boldklub og Idrætsforening (Danish: Fredensborg Ball and Sports Club), known as Fredensborg BI, is a Danish association football club located in the municipality of Fredensborg, which plays in the Denmark Series. Founded on 6 June 1908, it is one of the oldest clubs in Danish football. It competed in the 2003 and 2009 Danish Cup tournaments.

== Stadium ==
The stadium is used by Fredensborg BI and Fredensborg Atletik Forening og Pedalatleterne, the Fredensborg Athletes' and Cyclists Society. It holds 2,000 spectators, 100 of which are provided with seats. As of late 2008, the maximum number of spectators at one match has been 1,516 people.

== Trainers ==
Chief trainer

- Benny Johansen

Assistant trainer

- Freddi Kairies

== Records ==
- Best national ranking: finished 4th in the 1987 Denmark Series
