= Kjellerup IF =

Danish football club

- Full name: Kjellerup Idrætsforening
- Founded: 1907; 118 years ago (as Skjold)
- Ground: Bjerget, Kjellerup
- Capacity: 3,000
- Chairman: Jakob W. Knudsen
- Manager: Jakob Brix-Mouritsen
- League: Jutland Series (VI)
- 2024–25: Denmark Series Group 4, 10th of 10; Relegation group West, 8th of 10 (relegated)
- Website: kjellerupif.dk
Home colours

Kjellerup Idrætsforening is a Danish football club based in Kjellerup, Central Jutland. It was founded in 1907, and its first team competes in the Jutland Series, one of the sixth tiers of the Danish football league system. The club is a part of the DBU Jutland regional association, and plays its home matches at Bjerget Stadium.

== History ==
The club was formed in summer 1907 under the name "Fodboldforeningen Skjold", but in 1930 changed the association name to the current. In 1920, the club's program expanded to include swimming, athletics, handball and winter sport, but in 1946 it was decided to continue the association as a pure football club and other sports were transferred to the newly formed "Kjellerup Gymnastikforening" (Kjellerup Gymnastics Association).

In the summer of 2011, the club won the Denmark Series and moved up into Danish 2nd Division West for the first time in club history.
