= 2015–16 Danish Cup =

DBU Pokalen (The DBU Cup)

Tournament details
- Country: Denmark
- Teams: 108

Final positions
- Champions: Copenhagen
- Runners-up: AGF
- UEFA Europa League: SønderjyskE

The 2015–16 Danish Cup was the 62nd season of the Danish Cup competition. The winners of the competition qualified for the second qualifying round of the 2016–17 UEFA Europa League.

== First round ==
94 teams were drawn into this round. Matches were played on 4, 11, 12 and 19 August 2015.

4 August 2015	Middelfart G&BK (4)	1–1 (a.e.t.) (1–4 p)	Vejle Boldklub (2)	Vejle
	Spasojevic 51'	Vejle Report (in Danish)	Kielstrup 47' (pen.)	Stadium: Vejle Stadion; Attendance: 1.453; Referee: Morten Krogh
	Penalties
	Spasojevic (penalty missed); Kastrup (penalty scored); Weber (penalty missed)		Kielstrup (penalty scored); Andersen (penalty scored); Mucolli (penalty scored); Elgaard (penalty scored)

11 August 2015	FB	0–2	Skjold Birkerød	Frederiksberg
			Adamsen 48'; Madsen 51'	Stadium: Jens Jessensvej Kunst; Referee: Casper Thorsøe Jr.

11 August 2015	Aars IK	0–3	Vejgaard BK 2	Aars
		Vejgaard BK Report (in Danish)		Stadium: Aars Stadium

11 August 2015	Aulum IF	1–6	Brabrand IF	Vojens
	Laursen 74'		Kaljo 11', 67', 87'; Stage 47'; Öztürk 77'; Holvad 82'	Stadium: Vojens Fritidscenter; Referee: Michael V. Jensen

11 August 2015	BK 1973 Herlev	0–3	BK Søllerød-Vedbæk	Herlev
			Suhr Petersen 3'; Thinter 7'; Madsen 86'	Stadium: Elverroad; Referee: Jesper Nielsen

11 August 2015	Birkelse IF	1–3	Aalborg Freja IK	Birkelse
				Stadium: Jl Biler Arena; Referee: Mathias Kræmer

11 August 2015	NB Bornholm	2–2 (a.e.t.) (4–5 p)	Fredensborg BI	Nexø
	Olsen 48'; Andersen 88'		Brøndberg 55'; Schulze 75'	Stadium: Nexø Stadion; Referee: Janus Vorm

11 August 2015	DGL 2000	2–3	Kjellerup IF	Tilst
				Stadium: Tilst Idrætsanlæg; Referee: Jens Maae

11 August 2015	Frederikssund IK	3–1	GVI	Frederikssund
	Hansen 21'; Kirchmann 89'; Bonde 90'		Hansen 45'	Stadium: Frederikssund Stadion; Referee: Thomas Dahl Strandberg

11 August 2015	BK Fremad Valby	8–2	Virum-Sorgenfri BK	Copenhagen
				Stadium: Valby Idrætspark; Referee: Lars Skibild Jensen

11 August 2015	Fuglebakken KFUM Århus	0–3	AC Horsens	Aarhus
		Report (in Danish)	Bjerregaard 49'; Sanneh 62'; Boesen 86'	Stadium: Langenæs Idrætsanlæg; Referee: Morten Krogh

11 August 2015	Helsinge fB	0–3	Avedøre IF	Helsinge
			Svendsen 85'; Duer 87'; Mojab 90'	Stadium: Helsinge Stadion; Referee: Jakob A. Sundberg

11 August 2015	Hillerød Fodbold	1–0	Herlev IF	Hillerød
	Lindegaard 86'			Stadium: Hillerød Stadion; Referee: Jesper Dahl

11 August 2015	Kalundborg GB	3–5	KFUM BK Roskilde	Svebølle
	Ghyasvand 1'; Thrane 23'; Jensen 44'		Soerensen 6', 39'; Elvig 48'; Pfeiffer 70' (pen.); Dumic 88'	Stadium: Svebølle Stadion; Referee: Patrick Stenzel Rasmussen

11 August 2015	LSF	1–1 (a.e.t.) (5–3 p)	BK Frem	Smørum
18:30	D. Lind 35'		Azaquoun 61'	Stadium: Ledøje Idrætscenter; Attendance: 400; Referee: Martin Køster
	Penalties
	Larsen (penalty scored); M. Lind (penalty scored); Kjærsgaard (penalty scored); Jensen (penalty scored); Larsen (penalty scored)		Basti (penalty scored); Andersen (penalty missed); Østenkær (penalty scored); Nielsen (penalty scored)

11 August 2015	LUIF	0–2	Rishøj Boldklub	Brøndby
		(in Danish)	Krdzic 47', 77'	Stadium: Brøndby IF's anlæg Referee: Anders Skjødt Petersen

11 August 2015	IF Lyseng	2–0	Viby IF	Højbjerg
				Stadium: Lyseng Idrætspark; Referee: Michael Rasmussen

11 August 2015	Lystrup IF	0–2	IK Skovbakken	Lystrup
				Stadium: Lystrup Enge Idrætsanlæg; Referee: Brian Jessen

11 August 2015	Marslev G & IF	0–10	Tarup-Paarup IF	Lystrup
				Stadium: Lystrup Enge Idrætsanlæg; Referee: Allan Rørdahl Borgstrøm

11 August 2015	Morud IF	1–7	BK Marienlyst	Esbjerg
	? (?)		James (?); Pedersen (?); Kongstedt (?); Dolezal (?)	Stadium: Esbjerg Idrætspark; Referee: Peter Rasmussen

11 August 2015	Næsby BK	0–6	FC Fredericia	Odense
			Ćatović 6', 51' (pen.); Hansen 14', 20', 63'; Hagelskjaer 19'	Stadium: Næsby Stadion; Referee: Peter Kjærsgaard

11 August 2015	IF Skjold Sæby	1–7	Thisted FC	Thisted
	Overlade 60' (pen.)		Høvenhoff 15'; Jakobsen 22', 70'; Nielsen 58', 83', 88'; Rønn 74'	Stadium: Sparekassen Thy Arena; Referee: Brian Jessen

11 August 2015	Sædding-Guldager IF	3–1	Kolding Boldklub 2	Svebølle
				Stadium: Svebølle Stadion; Referee: Jørgen Daugbjerg Burchardt

11 August 2015	BK Frem Sakskøbing	0–4	FC Vestsjælland	Sakskøbing
			Wagner 22'; Randrup 39'; Jul Nielsen 52'; Nymann 60'	Stadium: Inges Auto Park; Referee: Benjamin Leander

11 August 2015	Sundby BK	1–4	B. 93	Copenhagen
	? (?)		Holst (?); Senoglu (?); Drost (?)	Stadium: Sundby Idrætspark; Referee: Benjamin Helm Svedborg

11 August 2015	Tjørring IF	0–4	Skive IK	Herning
			Uhre 38', 43', 83'; Zetterquist 80'	Stadium: Nordvesthallen; Referee: Michael Tykgaard

11 August 2015	Hellerup IK	0–3	Brønshøj BK	Gentofte
			Fearrington 52'; Sharza 72', 89'	Stadium: Gentofte Stadion; Referee: Benjamin Willaume-Jantzen

12 August 2015	BK Avarta	2–5	HB Køge	Rødovre
	Ingvardsen 78'; D. Andersen 83'		Kamel 26', 27'; Andersen 50', 74'; Pind 63'	Stadium: Espelundens Idrætsanlæg; Attendance: 368; Referee: Michael Johansen

12 August 2015	Boldklubben 1913	0–3	F.C. Svendborg	Odense
				Stadium: Campus Road; Referee: Allan Rørdahl Borgstrøm

12 August 2015	IF Frem Bjæverskov	0–4	Næstved BK	Bjæverskov
				Stadium: Skovbohallen; Referee: Lars Christoffersen

12 August 2015	Døllefjelde-Musse IF	1–4	Holbæk B&I	Nysted
				Stadium: DMI's anlæg Referee: Yasin Seker

12 August 2015	Esbjerg IF 92	3–4	FC Sydvest 05	Esbjerg
				Stadium: Skibhøj Anlæg; Referee: Bjarke Bruun

12 August 2015	FC Sønderborg	4–1	Varde IF	Sønderborg
	C. Nielsen (?); Truelsen (?)		? (?)	Stadium: Alsie Express Park; Referee: Allan Staal

12 August 2015	IF Føroyar	0–6	Hvidovre IF	Copenhagen
			Pedersen 5'; Dahl 16'; Benjaminsen 22'; Vestergaard 47', 56'; Risvig 73'	Stadium: Kløvermarken; Referee: Peter Munch Larsen

12 August 2015	Frederiksberg Alliancen 2000	1–3	Greve Fodbold	Frederiksberg
				Stadium: Frederiksberg IP; Referee: Benjamin Leander

12 August 2015	Jægersborg BK	3–1	Vanløse IF	Gentofte
				Stadium: Jægersborg; Referee: Lars Skibild Jensen

12 August 2015	Jammerbugt FC	1–3	Vendsyssel FF	Pandrup
	Nielsen 71'		Winther 36'; Sørensen 58'; C. Sørensen 64'	Stadium: Jetsmark Stadion; Referee: Morten Krogh

12 August 2015	Langeskov IF	0–5	Nyborg G&IF	Langeskov
			Moellebaek 2'; Andersson 7'; Ellegaard 23', 33'; Fjeldsoe 83'	Stadium: Langeskov Stadion; Referee: Morten Bertelsen

12 August 2015	Lundtoft IF	1–7	Kolding IF	Aabenraa
	? (?)		Friis (?); Frederiksen (?); Forst Jensen (?); Hedeager Jensen (?)	Stadium: Kliplev Hallen; Referee: Claus Steiner

12 August 2015	Ringkøbing IF	1–2	Odder IGF	Ringkøbing
	Østervemb Nielsen 11'		Skibsted 9' (pen.); Rocatis 67'	Stadium: Green Arena; Referee: Michael Rasmussen

12 August 2015	Sohus Stige BK	4–2	Aarslev BK	Odense
				Stadium: Spar Stige Arena; Referee: Søren Stagaard

12 August 2015	Tårnby FF	1–3	FC Helsingør	Kastrup
	Bernburg 48'		Lazarevic 15'; Riel 81', 90+5'	Stadium: Vestamager Idrætsanlæg; Referee: Benjamin Willaume-Jantzen

12 August 2015	Holstebro BK	0–4	Silkeborg IF	Holstebro
			Albers 18', 36'; Sørensen 28'; Scheel 90'	Stadium: Holstebro Idrætspark; Attendance: 474; Referee: Esad Deronjic

12 August 2015	Nykøbing FC	1–2	FC Roskilde	Nykøbing Falster
	J. Pedersen 78'		Brøgger Hansen 26'; Lissau 47'	Stadium: Enelco Arena; Attendance: 306; Referee: Kasper Madsen

12 August 2015	Akademisk Boldklub	0–3	Lyngby Boldklub	Søborg
			Ljuti 29'; Mistrati 51'; Akpoveta 55'	Stadium: Gladsaxe Stadion; Attendance: 965; Referee: Anders Poulsen

19 August 2015	B 1908	2–0	Fremad Amager	Copenhagen
	Mortensen 27' (o.g.); Lisborg 90'			Stadium: Sundby Idrætspark

== Second round ==
56 teams were drawn into this round. Matches were played on 25 August, 1, 2, 8, 9 and 23 September 2015.

25 August 2015	Brabrand IF (3)	1–2	FC Fredericia (2)	Brabrand
	Holvad 75'		Hansen 52'; Somers 84'	Stadium: Brabrand IF's Idrætsanlæg; Referee: Mads-Kristoffer Kristoffersen

25 August 2015	Næstved BK (2)	1–0	FC Nordsjælland (1)	Næstved
	Nygaard 76'			Stadium: Næstved Stadion; Referee: Benjamin Helm Svedborg

1 September 2015	Fredensborg BI (4)	1–0	B 1908 (3)	Fredensborg
	Brøndberg 45'			Stadium: Fredensborg Stadion; Attendance: 150; Referee: Yasin Seker

1 September 2015	Frederikssund IK (4)	2–6	HB Køge (2)	Frederikssund
	Kirchmann 25'; Helev 84'		Munksgaard 6'; Bedell 20', 72', 74'; Henriksen 47'; Caion 88'	Stadium: Frederikssund Stadion; Referee: Lars Skibild Jensen

1 September 2015	Hillerød Fodbold (4)	1–2	FC Helsingør (2)	Hillerød
	Lindgaard 79' (pen.)		Knudstrup 27'; Boateng 50'	Stadium: Hillerød Stadion; Referee: Jakob A. Sundberg

1 September 2015	IF Lyseng (4)	1–2	Kolding IF (2)	Højbjerg
				Stadium: Lyseng Idrætspark; Referee: Chris Johansen

1 September 2015	Rishoj BK (4)	2–0	BK Søllerød-Vedbæk (4)	Køge
	Højer (?); Schmidt (?)			Stadium: Rishøj Stadion; Referee: Benjamin Leander

1 September 2015	Sædding-Guldager IF (4)	1–5	Lystrup IF (4)	Esbjerg
				Stadium: Guldager Idrætscenter; Referee: Aydin Uslu

1 September 2015	Søhus Stige BK (4)	0–9	Esbjerg fB (1)	Odense
			Andreasen 8', 83' van Buren 22', 41'; Fellah 35', 76'; Söder 45', 62'; Mensah 85'	Stadium: Spar Stige Arena; Referee: Peter Rasmussen

1 September 2015	FC Svendborg (3)	0–3	Silkeborg IF (2)	Svendborg
			Thomsen 8'; Albers 29'; Sørensen 57'	Stadium: Høje Bøge Stadion; Referee: Henrik Overgaard

1 September 2015	Vejgaard Boldspilklub (4)	3–2	FC Sydvest 05 (4)	Aalborg
				Stadium: Soffy Road; Referee: Martin Braun Christensen

1 September 2015	BK Marienlyst (3)	1–5	Viborg FF (1)	Odense
	Dolezal 90'		Reese 33'; Mensah 70', 90+1'; Lerager 73'; Gero 76'	Stadium: Marienlystcentret; Referee: Benjamin Helm Svedborg

1 September 2015	Holbæk B&I (3)	4–2	B. 93 (3)	Holbæk
	Ali 18', 37'; Jensen 49'; Asrihi 70'		Senoglu 27'; Heimer 55'	Stadium: SuRi Park; Referee: Casper Thorsøe Jr.

1 September 2015	Thisted FC (3)	1–2	SønderjyskE (1)	Thisted
	Lauridsen 80'		Absalonsen 43' (pen.), 90+4' (pen.)	Stadium: Sparekassen Thy Arena; Referee: Jakob Kehlet

1 September 2015	Herlufsholm GF (4)	0–5	Brønshøj BK (3)	Brønshøj
			Naundrup 48', 57', 89'; Sharza 61', 80'	Stadium: Tingbjerg Idrætspark; Referee: Benjamin Willaume-Jantzen

2 September 2015	Avedøre IF (4)	0–3	FC Vestsjælland (2)	Avedøre
		Report	Rochester 42'; Hebo 53'; Felfel 54'	Stadium: Avedøre Stadion; Referee: Lars Christoffersen

2 September 2015	Skjold Birkerød (4)	1–4	KFUM Roskilde (4)	Birkerød
		Report		Stadium: Birkerød Stadion

2 September 2015	LSF (4)	0–5	Lyngby BK (1)	Smørum
		Report		Stadium: Ledøje Idrætscenter

2 September 2015	Nyborg G & IF (5)	0–5	Greve (4)	Nyborg
		Report		Stadium: Nyborg Idrætspark

2 September 2015	Fremad Valby (5)	2–2 (a.e.t.) (4–5 p)	Hvidovre IF (3)	Valby
		Report		Stadium: Valby Idrætspark

2 September 2015	Aabyhøj IF (4)	0–2	SUB Sønderborg (4)	Aabyhøj
		Report		Stadium: Aabyhøj Stadion

2 September 2015	Vejle BK (2)	0–0 (a.e.t.) (2–4 p)	Hobro IK (1)	Vejle
		Report		Stadium: Vejle Stadion

2 September 2015	Kjellerup IF (4)	1–8	AGF (1)	Kjellerup
		Report		Stadium: Bjerget

8 September 2015	Odder IGF (3)	0–1	Skive IK (2)	Odder
		Report		Stadium: Odder Stadion

8 September 2015	Aalborg Freja IK (4)	0–6	AC Horsens (2)	Aalborg
		Report		Stadium: Ny Frejapark

9 September 2015	Tarup-Paarup IF (4)	0–2	OB (1)	Odense
17:45 CEST	Fønss (yellow card) 44'	Report	Festersen 70', 81'	Stadium: TRE-FOR Park

9 September 2015	Vendsyssel FF (2)	0–2	AaB (1)	Hjørring
		Report		Stadium: Hjørring Stadion

23 September 2015	Jægersborg BK (4)	1–6	FC Roskilde (2)	Gentofte
				Stadium: Gentofte Stadion

== Third round ==
32 teams were drawn into this round. Matches were played on 22, 23, 24 and 29 September 2015.

22 September 2015	Greve (4)	2–1	Hvidovre IF (3)	Greve
16:00 CEST		Report		Stadium: Greve Idræts Center

22 September 2015	KFUM Roskilde (4)	1–5	Viborg FF (1)	Roskilde
16:00 CEST		Report		Stadium: Lillevang Idrætscenter

22 September 2015	Vejgaard Boldspilklub (4)	1–3	SønderjyskE (1)	Aalborg
16:30 CEST		Report		Stadium: Soffy Road

22 September 2015	FC Fredericia (2)	2–1	OB (1)	Fredericia
18:15 CEST		Report		Stadium: Monjasa Park

22 September 2015	Rishøj BK (4)	3–2	Brønshøj BK (3)	Køge
18:30 CEST		Report		Stadium: Køge Stadion

22 September 2015	Silkeborg IF (2)	0–1	AGF (1)	Silkeborg
20:45 CEST		Report		Stadium: Mascot Park

23 September 2015	Fredensborg BI (4)	0–1	FC Helsingør (2)	Fredensborg
16:00 CEST		Report		Stadium: Fredensborg Stadion

23 September 2015	Kolding IF (3)	1–3 (a.e.t.)	Skive IK (2)	Kolding
18:00 CEST		Report		Stadium: Kolding Stadion

23 September 2015	FC Vestsjælland (2)	0–2	Copenhagen (1)	Slagelse
18:00 CEST		Report		Stadium: Harboe Arena Slagelse

23 September 2015	HB Køge (2)	2–0	AC Horsens (2)	Herfølge
19:00 CEST		Report		Stadium: SEAS-NVE Park

23 September 2015	Holbæk B&I (3)	0–7	Brøndby IF (1)	Holbæk
20:45 CEST		Report		Stadium: SuRi Park

24 September 2015	SUB Sønderborg (4)	0–6	Randers FC (1)	Sønderborg
16:00 CEST		Report		Stadium: Alsie Express Park

24 September 2015	Lyngby BK (2)	1–0	Esbjerg fB (1)	Kongens Lyngby
18:15 CEST		Report		Stadium: Lyngby Stadion

24 September 2015	Næstved BK (2)	0–3	FC Midtjylland (1)	Næstved
20:45 CEST		Report		Stadium: Næstved Stadion

29 September 2015	Lystrup IF (4)	0–4	AaB (1)	Aalborg
18:00 CEST		Report		Stadium: Nordjyske Arena

29 September 2015	FC Roskilde (2)	0–0 (a.e.t.) (7–6 p)	Hobro IK (1)	Roskilde
19:00 CEST		Report		Stadium: Roskilde Idrætspark

== Fourth round ==
16 teams were drawn into this round. Matches were played on 21, 27, 28 and 29 October 2015.

21 October 2015	FC Helsingør (2)	0–2	Randers FC (1)	Helsingør
15:00 CEST		Report	Danekilde 16' (o.g.); Kallesøe (yellow card) 52'; Keller 76'	Stadium: Helsingør Stadion; Attendance: 698; Referee: Lars Christoffersen

27 October 2015	Rishøj BK (4)	0–3	AGF (1)	Brønshøj
18:15 CEST		Report	Piscu (yellow card) 3'; Mikanović 68'; Nordstrand 73'; Aabech 90'	Stadium: Tingbjerg Idrætspark; Attendance: 392; Referee: Benjamin Svedborg

27 October 2015	Skive IK (2)	3–2	Viborg FF (1)	Skive
19:00 CEST	Frankoch 10'; Pedersen 27'; Ashiru 90+2'	Report	Sivebæk 39'; Poulsen 56'	Stadium: SPAR Nord Arena; Attendance: 1,066; Referee: Jørgen Daugbjerg Burchardt

28 October 2015	Greve (4)	2–6	SønderjyskE (1)	Greve
14:00 CEST	Larsson 62'; Clausen 90'	Report	Dalgaard 14', 18'; Okwi 61', 64'; Simonsen 68'; Hedegaard 83'	Stadium: Greve Idrætscenter; Attendance: 1,143; Referee: Dennis Mogensen

28 October 2015	FC Roskilde (2)	3–2 (a.e.t.)	FC Midtjylland (1)	Herning
18:15 CEST	Hansen 15'; Lissau (yellow card) 32'; Fetai 58'; Kristiansen (yellow card) 82'; Bech 99'	Report	Larsen 28'; Banggaard (yellow card) 30'; Royer (yellow card) 32'; Lauridsen (yellow card) 36'; Munksgaard (yellow card) 58' (yellow-red card) 119'; Rasmussen 67'; Onuachu (yellow card) 69'	Stadium: MCH Arena; Attendance: 2,853; Referee: Jens Maae

28 October 2015	Lyngby BK (2)	1–2	AaB (1)	Kongens Lyngby
20:45 CEST	Akpoveta (yellow card) 44'; Odgaard 89'	Report	Pedersen 33'; Bruhn (yellow card) 35'; Spalvis 68', (red card) 77'	Stadium: Lyngby Stadion; Attendance: 1,399

29 October 2015	FC Fredericia (2)	1–2 (a.e.t.)	Copenhagen (1)	Fredericia
18:15 CEST	Ćatović (yellow card) 38'; Hagelskjær 43'; Podstavek (yellow card) 116'	Report	Amankwaa 29'; Kusk 92'	Stadium: Monjasa Park; Attendance: 2,649; Referee: Mads Kristoffer Kristoffersen

29 October 2015	HB Køge (2)	0–1	Brøndby IF (1)	Herfølge
20:45 CEST	Wohlgemuth (yellow card) 63'	Report	Eriksson (yellow card) 34'; Juelsgård (yellow card) 45'; Hjulsager (yellow card) 67'; Schwartz 90+2'	Stadium: SEAS-NVE Park; Attendance: 3,543; Referee: Peter Rasmussen

== Quarter-finals ==
8 teams were drawn into this round. Matches were played on 1, 2 and 16 March and 5 April 2016.

1 March 2016	SønderjyskE (1)	0–3	AGF (1)	Haderslev
18:00 CEST	Madsen (yellow card) 42'	Report	Rasmussen 8'; Bjarnason 23', (yellow card) 58'; Lange 72'; Christensen (yellow card) 77'	Stadium: Haderslev Fodboldstadion; Attendance: 2,785; Referee: Peter Rasmussen

2 March 2016	Skive IK (2)	0–3	Brøndby IF (1)	Skive
18:30 CEST		Report	Eriksson 48'; Elmander 89'; Kahlenberg 90+2'	Stadium: SPAR Nord Arena; Attendance: 3,187; Referee: Jørgen Daugbjerg Burchardt

16 March 2016	Copenhagen (1)	2–1 (a.e.t.)	Randers FC (1)	Copenhagen
17:00 CEST	Santander 60'; Jørgensen (yellow card) 90+5', (goal) 116'; Delaney (yellow card) 93'	Report	Lundberg (yellow card) 30'; Tverskov (yellow card) 32'; Marxen (yellow card) 58'; Junker 90+1'	Stadium: Telia Parken; Referee: Lars Christoffersen

5 April 2016	FC Roskilde (2)	0–4	AaB (1)	Roskilde
18:00 CEST			Thomsen 26' (pen.); Enevoldsen 32', 40'; Børsting 54'	Stadium: Roskilde Idrætspark

== Semi-finals ==
6 April 2016	Copenhagen (1)	1–1	Brøndby IF (1)	Copenhagen
18:00 CEST	Delaney (yellow card) 18', (goal) 83'	Report	Pukki 27'; Jakobsen (yellow card) 68'	Stadium: Telia Parken; Attendance: 20,611; Referee: Michael Tykgaard

20 April 2016	Brøndby IF (1)	0–1	Copenhagen (1)	Copenhagen
20:00 CEST			Jørgensen 77'; Johansson (yellow card) 82'	Stadium: Brøndby Stadion

13 April 2016	AaB (1)	0–2	AGF (1)	Aalborg
18:00 CEST	Abildgaard (yellow card) 4'; Enevoldsen (yellow card) 72'; Børsting (yellow card) 88'	Report	Pedersen (yellow card) 20'; Bjarnason 22', (yellow card) 90+4'; Rasmussen (yellow card) 61'; Duncan 62'	Stadium: Nordjyske Arena; Attendance: 7,196; Referee: Jørgen Daugbjerg

21 April 2016	AGF (1)	2–2	AaB (1)	Aarhus
20:00 CEST	Petersen 56' (o.g.); Bjarnason 90+2'	Report	Enevoldsen 26'; Pedersen (yellow card) 35'; Thomsen 52'; Ahlmann (yellow card) 66'; Würtz (yellow card) 77'	Stadium: Ceres Park; Attendance: 14,094; Referee: Peter Kjærsgaard-Andersen

== Final ==
The final took place at Telia Parken in Copenhagen, which is usually the stadium of Copenhagen. It was played on the day of Feast of the Ascension (5 May).

5 May 2016
17:00 CEST

AGF (1)	1–2	Copenhagen (1)
Duncan 45'		Jørgensen 29'; Kvist 78'

Telia Parken, Copenhagen
Attendance: 35,828
Referee: Mads-Kristoffer Kristoffersen
