= List of Fremad Amager seasons =

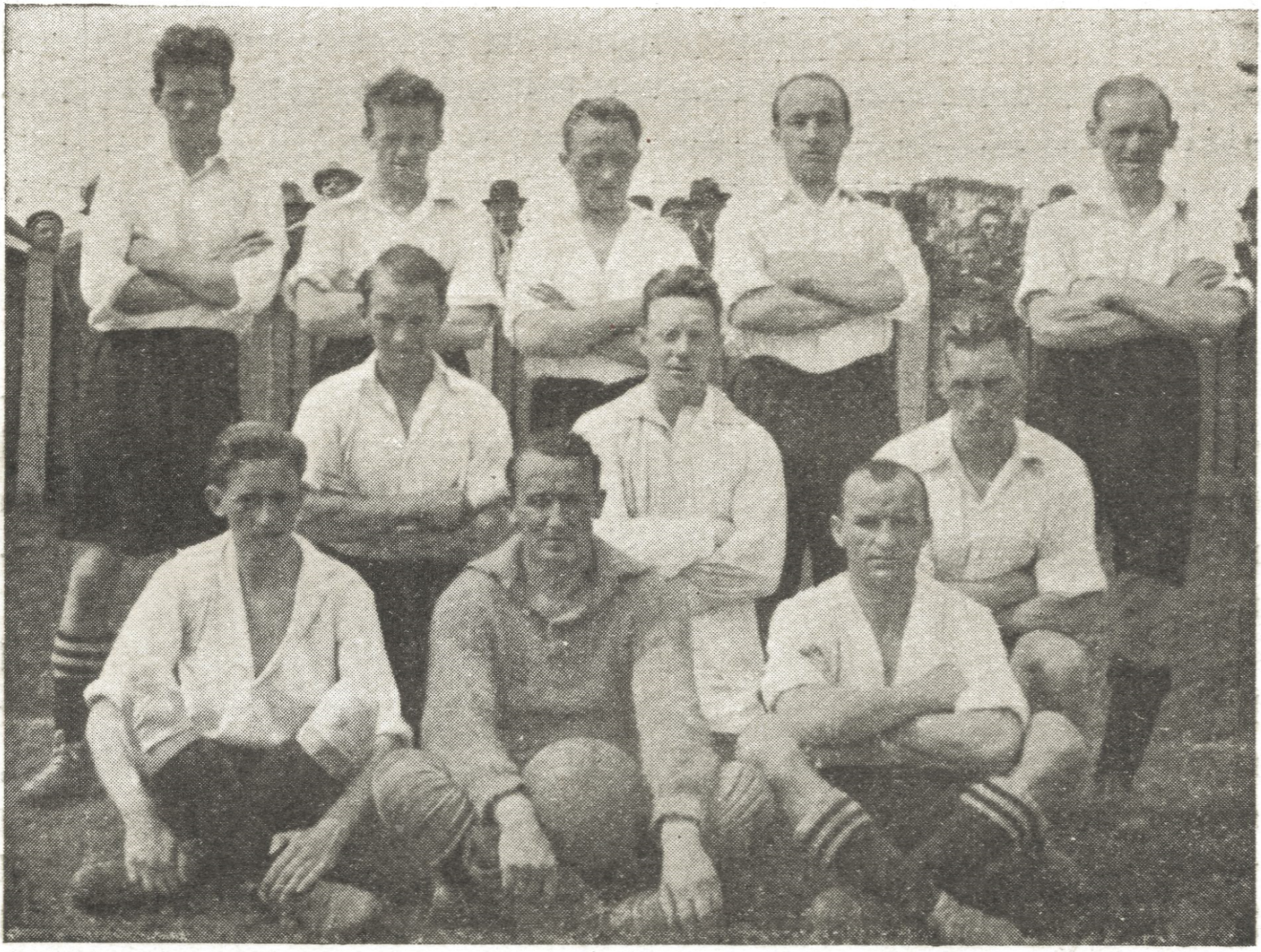
The BK Fremad Amager line-up in the promotion play-offs of the 1925–26 season against KFUM København, in which the club secured advancement to the regional top-flight league.

BK Fremad Amager is a Danish professional association football club based in Sundbyvester, Copenhagen. This list details the club's achievements in all competitive tournaments including league average attendance figures and top scorers, from the club's founding in June 1910 up to the most recent season. During its first two years of existence, the Amager-based club did not compete in organised league football and participated exclusively in friendly matches. In 1912, Fremad Amager played an integral part in the formation of the sub-regional football association Amager Boldspil-Union (ABU). A few years later, the club also took part in the establishment of the wider-reaching Københavns Forstadsklubbers Boldspil Union (KFBU), before applying for and ultimately joining the regional football association Københavns Boldspil-Union (KBU) in 1920. The list covers the club's periods of amateur, semi-professional, and professional football, including their involvement in the superstructure FC Amager.

In the first senior league season organised by the Amager Football Association, BK Fremad Amager finished second with six points, four points behind local rivals B 1908, who secured first place. The club's first competitive league match was played at their home ground in April 1912 against B 1908 and ended in a 0–13 defeat. The match formed part of the inaugural official regional football championship for the island of Amager. Københavns Forstadsklubbers Boldspil Union organised a cup tournament involving the surrounding districts of Copenhagen, in which Fremad Amager participated as Amager's representative. Following the club's admission as an extraordinary member of the Københavns Boldspil-Union (KBU) in 1920, they became a full member the following year, in 1921. The club progressed from its initial regional third-tier level, Deltagerturneringen, to KBU's highest regional division, KBUs Mesterskabsrække, in 1926. At the time, this league was regarded as the strongest regional football league in Denmark and featured several national team players. Between 1920 and 1927, Fremad Amager competed exclusively in regional leagues and cup tournaments in Copenhagen and did not qualify for the national league championship play-offs, Landsfodboldturneringen.

Fremad Amager competed in the inaugural season of the nationwide league tournament, the 1927–28 Danmarksmesterskabsturneringen, organised under the auspices of the Danish Football Association (DBU). Since then, the club has primarily played within the top five tiers of the Danish football league system and has participed in the Danmarksturneringen i fodbold in all but two seasons. The club's most successful period occurred around the outbreak of the Second World War, when they finished as runners-up in the top-flight league on two occasions, in the 1939–40 and 1940–41 seasons. Fremad Amager made their debut in the KBUs Pokalturnering in the 1925 edition, and participated regularly in the regional cup until the 1953 edition, when the competition was replaced by the newly established nationwide cup, DBUs Landspokalturnering. Overall, the club has competed in the Danish top-flight division for a total of 20 seasons and has reached the Danish Cup final on one occasion, which qualified the team for their only European tournament partake, the 1972–73 European Cup Winners' Cup.

== Key ==
Key to league competitions:

- Level 1: Danmarksmesterskabsturneringen (1927–1929), Mesterskabsserien (1929–1940), Danmarksturneringen (1940–1945), 1. division (1945–1990), Superligaen (1991–present)
- Level 2: Oprykningsserien (1929–1936), II. Serie (1936–1940), 2. division (1945–1990), Kvalifikationsligaen (1992s, 1993s, 1994s, 1995s), 1. division (1991–present)
- Level 3: III. Serie (1936–1940), 3. division (1945–1990), 2. division (1991–present)
- Level 4: Kvalifikationsturneringen (1959–1965), Kvalifikationsrækken (1996–2000), 3. division (2021–present)
- Level 5: Danmarksserien for herrer (1966–present)
- Level 6 (Level 1 under DBU Copenhagen): KBUs Mesterskabsrække (1920–1936), KBUs A-række (1936–1947), Københavnsserien A / Københavnsserien B (1947–1977), Københavnsserien (1978–present)
- Level 7 (Level 2 under DBU Copenhagen): KBUs A-række (1920–1936), KBUs B-række (1936–1947), KBUs Mellemrække (1947–1984), KBUs Serie 1 (1985–2011), DBU København Serie 1 (2011–present)
- Level 8 (Level 3 under DBU Copenhagen): KBUs Deltagerturnering & KBUs Forstadsturnering (1920–21), KBUs B-række (1921–1936), KBUs C-række (1944–1947), KBUs A-række (1947–1984), KBUs Serie 2 (1985–2011), DBU København Serie 2 (2011–present)

Key to colours and symbols:

1st or W	Winners/Champions
2nd or RU	Runners-up
3rd	Third place
↑	Promoted
↓	Relegated
♦	Top scorer in division

Key to league record:

- Season = The year and article of the season
- Position = Final position in table
- Level = Level in the football league system
- P = Games played
- W = Games won
- D = Games drawn
- L = Games lost
- F = Goals scored
- A = Goals against
- Pts = Points

Key to cup record:

- En-dash (–) = Did not participate
- DSQ = Disqualified
- DNE = Did not enter cup play
- QR1 = First qualification round, etc.
- GS = Group stage
- GS2 = Second group stage
- R1 = First round, etc.
- R16 = Round of 16
- QF = Quarter-finals
- SF = Semi-finals
- RU = Runners-up
- W = Winners

== Seasons ==
Results of league and cup competitions by season.

Season		League										Cup	Europe / Other		Avg. Home Attendance (Note: Only league games are counted, not including championship replays, promotion and relegation play-off matches.)	Top goalscorer(s)		Refs
Season		Level	Division	P	W	D	L	F	A	Pts	Position	Cup	Competition	Result	Avg. Home Attendance	Name	Goals	Refs
1910		The club did not start playing organised league football until 1912.										The club only participated in friendly matches for its first two seasons.						—N/a
1911		The club did not start playing organised league football until 1912.										The club only participated in friendly matches for its first two seasons.						—N/a
1912		1	ABUs Amager-Turnering	6	2	2	2	—N/a	—N/a	6	2nd of 4	—	ABUs Pokalturnering (spring) ABUs Pokalturnering (fall)	SF SF	—N/a	—N/a	—N/a	
1913		1	ABUs Amager-Turnering	—N/a	—N/a	—N/a	—N/a	—N/a	—N/a	—N/a	? of 7	—	—N/a	—N/a	—N/a	—N/a	—N/a	—N/a
1914		1	ABUs Amager-Turnering	—N/a	—N/a	—N/a	—N/a	—N/a	—N/a	—N/a	? of ?	—	—N/a	—N/a	—N/a	—N/a	—N/a	—N/a
1915		1	ABUs Amager-Turnering	—N/a	—N/a	—N/a	—N/a	—N/a	—N/a	—N/a	? of ?	—	—N/a	—N/a	—N/a	—N/a	—N/a	—N/a
1915–16		1	ABUs Amager-Turnering	7	4	2	1	—N/a	—N/a	10	2nd of 5	—	Aftenpostens Pokalturnering	QF	—N/a	—N/a	—N/a	
1916–17		1	ABUs Amager-Turnering	8	—N/a	—N/a	—N/a	—N/a	—N/a	—N/a	? of 5	—	Aftenpostens Pokalturnering ABUs Pokalturnering	QF QF	—N/a	—N/a	—N/a	
1917–18		1	ABUs Amager-Turnering	—N/a	—N/a	—N/a	—N/a	—N/a	—N/a	—N/a	2nd of ?	—	—N/a	—N/a	—N/a	—N/a	—N/a	—N/a
1918–19		—N/a	—N/a	—N/a	—N/a	—N/a	—N/a	—N/a	—N/a	—N/a	—N/a	—	—N/a	—N/a	—N/a	—N/a	—N/a	—N/a
1919–20		—N/a	—N/a	—N/a	—N/a	—N/a	—N/a	—N/a	—N/a	—N/a	—N/a	—	Amagerklubbernes Pokalturnering	W	—N/a	—N/a	—N/a	
1920–21		3	KBUs Deltagerturnering	4 10	4 6	0 2	0 2	21 31	2 20	8 14	1st of 3 (of 8) ↑ Won promotion playoffs	—	Amagerklubbernes Pokalturnering	SF	—N/a	—N/a	—N/a	
1921–22		2	KBUs A-række	8	2	0	6	11	20	4	8th of 9	—	—N/a	—N/a	—N/a	—N/a	—N/a	
1922–23		2	KBUs A-række	9	3	2	4	18	24	8	5th of 10	—	Amagerklubbernes Pokalturnering	W	—N/a	—N/a	—N/a	
1923–24		2	KBUs A-række	9	3	3	3	22	24	9	5th of 10	—	Amagerklubbernes Pokalturnering	SF	—N/a	—N/a	—N/a	
1924–25		2	KBUs A-række	10	7	1	2	26	14	15	1st of 11; Lost promotion playoffs	—	Fælledklubbernes Pokalturnering Amagerklubbernes Pokalturnering	W ?	—N/a	—N/a	—N/a	
1925–26		2	KBUs A-række	11	11	0	0	69	12	22	1st of 12 ↑ Won promotion playoffs	—	KBUs Pokalturnering Fælledklubbernes Pokalturnering Amagerklubbernes Pokalturnering	R1 QF R1	—N/a	—N/a	—N/a	
1926–27		1	KBUs Mesterskabsrække	10	3	0	7	23	44	6	6th of 6 Won relegation playoffs	—	KBUs Pokalturnering D-Gruppens Pokalturnering	R1 W	3,577 (Note: The home attendance average takes all league matches into account, as all teams in the league played their matches at Københavns Idrætspark. The attendance during promotion/relegation play-off matches in the league are also included.)	Ernst Quick	7	
1927–28		1	Danmarksmesterskabsturneringen, 1. Kreds Danmarksmesterskabsturneringen, Slutrunden	3 4	2 1	1 0	0 3	9 26	6 26	4 2	1st of 4 4th of 5	—	KBUs Pokalturnering D-Gruppens Pokalturnering Amagerklubbernes Pokalturnering	R1 W RU	1,358 (Note: The home attendance average takes the six league matches (excluding the away match against Horsens FS), that were played at Sundby Idrætspark and Københavns Idrætspark into account as both stadiums were considered the club's home ground.)	Ernst Quick	9	
1927–28		2	KBUs Mesterskabsrække	10	2	0	8	16	39	4	6th of 6 Won relegation playoffs	—	KBUs Pokalturnering D-Gruppens Pokalturnering Amagerklubbernes Pokalturnering	R1 W RU	3,005	Knud Kastrup; Ernst Quick	5	
1928–29		1	Danmarksmesterskabsturneringen, Kreds III	4	0	1	3	7	22	1	5th of 5	—	KBUs Pokalturnering D-Gruppens Pokalturnering Amagerklubbernes Pokalturnering	SF RU RU	—N/a	—N/a	—N/a	
1928–29		2	KBUs Mesterskabsrække	10	2	0	8	20	57	4	6th of 6 ↓ Lost relegation playoffs	—	KBUs Pokalturnering D-Gruppens Pokalturnering Amagerklubbernes Pokalturnering	SF RU RU	—N/a	—N/a	—N/a	
1929–30		2	Oprykningsserien	6	4	0	2	22	12	8	3rd of 7	—	KBUs Pokalturnering D-Gruppens Pokalturnering Amagerklubbernes Pokalturnering	R1 W SF	—N/a	—N/a	—N/a	
1929–30		4	KBUs A-række	13	10	2	1	55	21	22	2nd of 14 ↑	—	KBUs Pokalturnering D-Gruppens Pokalturnering Amagerklubbernes Pokalturnering	R1 W SF	—N/a	—N/a	—N/a	
1930–31		2	Oprykningsserien	8	7	1	0	31	9	15	1st of 9 ↑	—	KBUs Pokalturnering Amagerklubbernes Pokalturnering	R1 W	—N/a	—N/a	—N/a	
1930–31		3	KBUs Mesterskabsrække	7	1	0	6	11	18	2	7th of 8	—	KBUs Pokalturnering Amagerklubbernes Pokalturnering	R1 W	—N/a	—N/a	—N/a	
1931–32		1	Mesterskabsserien	9	1	1	7	16	35	3	9th of 10	—	KBUs Pokalturnering	R1	—N/a	—N/a	—N/a	
1931–32		3	KBUs Mesterskabsrække	7	3	0	4	14	16	6	5th of 8	—	KBUs Pokalturnering	R1	—N/a	—N/a	—N/a	
1932–33		1	Mesterskabsserien	9	2	0	7	12	30	4	9th of 10	—	KBUs Pokalturnering Amagerklubbernes Pokalturnering	SF RU	—N/a	—N/a	—N/a	
1932–33		3	KBUs Mesterskabsrække	7	1	2	4	9	19	4	7th of 8	—	KBUs Pokalturnering Amagerklubbernes Pokalturnering	SF RU	—N/a	—N/a	—N/a	
1933–34		1	Mesterskabsserien	9	2	1	6	13	29	5	9th of 10	—	KBUs Pokalturnering Amagerklubbernes Pokalturnering	RU W	—N/a	—N/a	—N/a	
1933–34		3	KBUs Mesterskabsrække	7	0	0	7	4	26	0	8th of 8 Won relegation playoffs	—	KBUs Pokalturnering Amagerklubbernes Pokalturnering	RU W	—N/a	—N/a	—N/a	
1934–35		1	Mesterskabsserien	9	1	2	6	7	39	4	10th of 10 ↓	—	KBUs Pokalturnering Amagerklubbernes Pokalturnering	R1 W	—N/a	—N/a	—N/a	
1934–35		3	KBUs Mesterskabsrække	7	2	0	5	8	17	4	8th of 8 ↓ Lost relegation playoffs	—	KBUs Pokalturnering Amagerklubbernes Pokalturnering	R1 W	—N/a	—N/a	—N/a	
1935–36		2	Oprykningsserien, Østkredsen	6	5	0	1	26	18	10	2nd of 7	—	KBUs Pokalturnering	SF	—N/a	—N/a	—N/a	
1935–36		4	KBUs A-række	15	12	0	3	56	21	24	2nd of 16	—	KBUs Pokalturnering	SF	—N/a	—N/a	—N/a	
1936–37		2	II Serie	18	10	3	5	60	46	23	3rd of 10	—	KBUs Sommerpokalturnering	RU	—N/a	—N/a	—N/a	
1937–38		2	II Serie	18	13	1	4	77	42	27	1st of 10 ↑	—	KBUs Pokalturnering	R1	—N/a	Oscar Theisen	18	
1938–39		1	Mesterskabsserien	18	5	3	10	32	57	13	9th of 10	—	KBUs Pokalturnering	SF	—N/a	Oscar Theisen	7	
1939–40		1	Mesterskabsserien	18	7	8	3	44	36	22	2nd of 10	—	Danmarkspokalturneringen KBUs Pokalturnering	R2 R1	—N/a	—N/a	—N/a	
1940–41		1	Danmarksturneringen, Kreds III Danmarksturneringen, Slutrunden	14 3	7 2	4 0	3 1	40 8	28 8	18 —	3rd of 8 Runners-up	—	KBUs Pokalturnering	SF	—N/a	Oscar Theisen	15 (Note: Oscar Theisen scored twelve goals in the group stage of the 1940–41 Danmarksturneringen and three goals in the championship play-off matches, netting a total of 15 goals throughout the top-flight season.)	
1941–42		1	Danmarksturneringen, Kreds III	14	7	0	7	35	37	14	5th of 8	—	KBUs Pokalturnering	R1	—N/a	Henning Frandsen	10	
1942–43		1	Danmarksturneringen, Kreds III	14	3	3	8	21	33	9	6th of 8	—	KBUs Pokalturnering	R1	—N/a	Henning Frandsen	6	
1943–44		1	Danmarksturneringen, Kreds III	14	7	1	6	37	39	15	5th of 8	—	KBUs Pokalturnering	SF	—N/a	Oscar Theisen	11	
1944–45		1	Danmarksturneringen, Kreds III	16	5	0	11	21	39	10	8th of 9	—	KBUs Pokalturnering	R1	—N/a	—N/a	—N/a	
1945–46		1	1. Division	18	6	5	7	27	37	17	5th of 12	—	KBUs Pokalturnering	R1	—N/a	—N/a	—N/a	
1946–47		1	1. Division	18	10	2	6	36	30	22	3rd of 12	—	KBUs Pokalturnering	R1	—N/a	—N/a	—N/a	
1947–48		1	1. Division	18	1	3	14	19	55	5	10th of 12 ↓	—	KBUs Pokalturnering	SF	—N/a	—N/a	—N/a	
1948–49		2	2. Division	18	9	5	4	35	28	23	2nd of 12	—	—		—N/a	—N/a	—N/a	
1949–50		2	2. Division	18	10	5	3	39	25	25	2nd of 12	—	KBUs Pokalturnering	SF	—N/a	Kaj Frandsen	16 ♦	
1950–51		2	2. Division	18	11	2	5	43	29	24	2nd of 12	—	KBUs Pokalturnering	SF	—N/a	Carl Erik Sirak	15	
1951–52		2	2. Division	18	9	2	7	45	37	20	4th of 12	—	KBUs Pokalturnering	R16	—N/a	Jørgen Gøtterup	11	
1952–53		2	2. Division	18	6	6	6	24	28	18	6th of 12	—	KBUs Pokalturnering	W	—N/a	Jørgen Gøtterup	9	
1953–54		2	2. Division	18	6	2	10	30	42	14	10th of 12 ↓	—	KBUs Pokalturnering	R16	—N/a	Jørgen Gøtterup	10	
1954–55		3	3. Division	22	12	3	7	47	37	27	2nd of 12	R3	—		2,773	Aage Zachariassen; Bent Ib Jørgensen	8	
1955–56		3	3. division	22	7	5	10	56	55	19	9th of 12	R3	—		2,273	Finn Nielsen	18	
1956–57	a-s	3	3. division	33	18	3	12	74	61	39	6th of 12	R5	—		2,447	Aage Zachariassen	16	
1956–57	a	3	3. division	33	18	3	12	74	61	39	6th of 12	R3	—		2,447	Aage Zachariassen	16	
1958	s	3	3. division	22	17	1	4	59	25	35	2nd of 12 ↑	R3	—		N/A	Walther Jensen	17	
1958	a	3	3. division	22	17	1	4	59	25	35	2nd of 12 ↑	R4	—		N/A	Walther Jensen	17	
1959	s	2	2. division	22	6	4	12	34	53	16	12th of 12 ↓	R4	—		N/A	N/A	N/A	
1959	a	2	2. division	22	6	4	12	34	53	16	12th of 12 ↓	R3	—		N/A	N/A	N/A	
1960	s	3	3. division	22	11	7	4	41	27	29	3rd of 12	R3	—		N/A	Ole Jensen	11	
1960	a	3	3. division	22	11	7	4	41	27	29	3rd of 12	R1	—		N/A	Ole Jensen	11	
1961	s	3	3. division	22	11	6	5	43	31	28	3rd of 12	R1	—		N/A	Per Petersen	12	
1961	a	3	3. division	22	11	6	5	43	31	28	3rd of 12	R3	—		N/A	Per Petersen	12	
1962	s	3	3. division	22	7	2	13	42	53	16	11th of 12 ↓	R3	—		N/A	Ib Petersen	15	
1962	a	3	3. division	22	7	2	13	42	53	16	11th of 12 ↓	R3	—		N/A	Ib Petersen	15	
1963	s	4	Kvalifikationsturneringen	22	10	6	6	43	26	26	5th of 12	R3	—		N/A	N/A	N/A	
1963	a	4	Kvalifikationsturneringen	22	10	6	6	43	26	26	5th of 12	QR3	—		N/A	N/A	N/A	
1964	s	4	Kvalifikationsturneringen	22	16	4	2	59	18	36	1st of 12 ↑	QR3	—		1,545	Ib Petersen	18	
1964	a	4	Kvalifikationsturneringen	22	16	4	2	59	18	36	1st of 12 ↑	R2	—		1,545	Ib Petersen	18	
1965	s	3	3. division	22	9	4	9	52	47	22	5th of 12	R2	—		N/A	Ib Petersen	13	
1965	a	3	3. division	22	9	4	9	52	47	22	5th of 12	R3	—		N/A	Ib Petersen	13	
1966	s	3	3. division øst	22	9	4	9	30	36	22	7th of 12	R3	—		N/A	N/A	N/A	
1966	a	3	3. division øst	22	9	4	9	30	36	22	7th of 12	R1	—		N/A	N/A	N/A	
1967	s	3	3. division øst	22	10	3	9	26	19	23	5th of 12	R1	—		N/A	N/A	N/A	
1967	a	3	3. division øst	22	10	3	9	26	19	23	5th of 12	R1	—		N/A	N/A	N/A	
1968	s	3	3. division øst	22	14	5	3	48	26	33	2nd of 12	R1	—		N/A	Bent Andersen	12	
1968	a	3	3. division øst	22	14	5	3	48	26	33	2nd of 12	R2	—		N/A	Bent Andersen	12	
1969	s	3	3. division øst	22	14	6	2	48	23	34	1st of 12 ↑	R2	—		N/A	Peter Kristensen	20 ♦	
1969	a	3	3. division øst	22	14	6	2	48	23	34	1st of 12 ↑	R1	3. division Championship	RU	N/A	Peter Kristensen	20 ♦	
1970	s	2	2. division	22	5	5	12	23	40	15	11th of 12 ↓	R1	3. division Championship	RU	N/A	N/A	N/A	
1970	a	2	2. division	22	5	5	12	23	40	15	11th of 12 ↓	R2	—		N/A	N/A	N/A	
1971	s	3	3. division øst	22	15	4	3	52	24	34	1st of 12 ↑	R2	—		N/A	Leif Lerche	12	
1971	a	3	3. division øst	22	15	4	3	52	24	34	1st of 12 ↑	RU	3. division Championship	RU	N/A	Leif Lerche	12	
1972	s	2	2. division	22	6	8	8	36	46	20	10th of 12	RU	3. division Championship	RU	N/A	Leif Lerche	9	
1972	a	2	2. division	22	6	8	8	36	46	20	10th of 12	R3	Divisionsturneringen European Cup Winners' Cup	GS R1	N/A	Leif Lerche	9	
1973	s	2	2. division	22	7	5	10	30	32	19	10th of 12	R3	Divisionsturneringen European Cup Winners' Cup	GS R1	N/A	Erik Ryde	7	
1973	a	2	2. division	22	7	5	10	30	32	19	10th of 12	R2	Divisionsturneringen	GS	N/A	Erik Ryde	7	
1974	s	2	2. division	22	10	9	3	44	32	29	3rd of 12 ↑	R2	Divisionsturneringen	GS	3,092	Erik Ryde	11	
1974	a	2	2. division	22	10	9	3	44	32	29	3rd of 12 ↑	R4	—		3,092	Erik Ryde	11	
1975	s	1	1. division	30	10	4	16	45	54	24	13th of 16	R4	—		4,900	Frank Arnesen; Jørgen Salomonsen	10	
1975	a	1	1. division	30	10	4	16	45	54	24	13th of 16	R3	—		4,900	Frank Arnesen; Jørgen Salomonsen	10	
1976	s	1	1. division	30	7	7	16	34	52	21	15th of 16 ↓	R3	—		N/A	Jørgen Salomonsen	15	
1976	a	1	1. division	30	7	7	16	34	52	21	15th of 16 ↓	R2	—		N/A	Jørgen Salomonsen	15	
1977	s	2	2. division	30	16	6	8	63	41	38	4th of 16	R2	—		N/A	Jørgen Salomonsen	16	
1977	a	2	2. division	30	16	6	8	63	41	38	4th of 16	R3	—		N/A	Jørgen Salomonsen	16	
1978	s	2	2. division	30	14	6	10	46	47	34	6th of 16	R3	—		2,862	Jørgen Salomonsen	10	
1978	a	2	2. division	30	14	6	10	46	47	34	6th of 16	R2	—		2,862	Jørgen Salomonsen	10	
1979	s	2	2. division	30	15	10	5	61	44	40	3rd of 16 ↑	R2	—		3,585	Jørgen Salomonsen	15	
1979	a	2	2. division	30	15	10	5	61	44	40	3rd of 16 ↑	R2	Carlsberg Grand Prix	GS	3,585	Jørgen Salomonsen	15	
1980	s	1	1. division	30	9	8	13	36	53	26	14th of 16 ↓	R2	Carlsberg Grand Prix	GS	3,051	Johnny Jacobsen	13	
1980	a	1	1. division	30	9	8	13	36	53	26	14th of 16 ↓	QF	Carlsberg Grand Prix	GS	3,051	Johnny Jacobsen	13	
1981	s	2	2. division	30	11	8	11	52	52	30	7th of 16	QF	Carlsberg Grand Prix	GS	1,966	Geert Madsen	10	
1981	a	2	2. division	30	11	8	11	52	52	30	7th of 16	R3	Carlsberg Grand Prix	GS	1,966	Geert Madsen	10	
1982	s	2	2. division	30	10	5	15	42	55	25	12th of 16	R3	Carlsberg Grand Prix	GS	1,574	Michael Larsen	10	
1982	a	2	2. division	30	10	5	15	42	55	25	12th of 16	R2	Carlsberg Grand Prix Carlsberg Cup	GS GS	1,574	Michael Larsen	10	
1983	s	2	2. division	30	12	8	10	38	35	32	8th of 16	R2	Carlsberg Grand Prix Carlsberg Cup	GS GS	2,172	Michael Larsen; Friedl Ovesen	7	
1983	a	2	2. division	30	12	8	10	38	35	32	8th of 16	R2	Carlsberg Grand Prix Carlsberg Cup	GS GS	2,172	Michael Larsen; Friedl Ovesen	7	
1984	s	2	2. division	30	4	7	19	24	50	15	16th of 16 ↓	R2	Carlsberg Grand Prix Carlsberg Cup	GS GS	1,115	Michael Larsen	8	
1984	a	2	2. division	30	4	7	19	24	50	15	16th of 16 ↓	R2	Carlsberg Grand Prix	GS	1,115	Michael Larsen	8	
1985	s	3	3. division	30	15	7	8	49	36	37	4th of 16	R2	Carlsberg Grand Prix	GS	779	Jan Jørgensen	19	
1985	a	3	3. division	30	15	7	8	49	36	37	4th of 16	SF	Carlsberg Grand Prix Carlsberg Cup	GS R16	779	Jan Jørgensen	19	
1986	s	3	3. division øst	26	12	7	7	48	36	31	4th of 14	SF	Carlsberg Grand Prix Carlsberg Cup	GS R16	1,086	Jan Jørgensen	14	
1986	a	3	3. division øst	26	12	7	7	48	36	31	4th of 14	R3	—		1,086	Jan Jørgensen	14	
1987	s	3	3. division øst	26	18	4	4	67	32	40	1st of 14 ↑	R3	—		1,487	Bernd Dietrich	15 ♦	
1987	a	3	3. division øst	26	18	4	4	67	32	40	1st of 14 ↑	R4	—		1,487	Bernd Dietrich	15 ♦	
1988	s	2	2. division	26	11	4	11	47	44	26	8th of 14	R4	—		2,290	Peter Nielsen	9	
1988	a	2	2. division	26	11	4	11	47	44	26	8th of 14	R1	—		2,290	Peter Nielsen	9	
1989	s	2	2. division	26	10	7	9	54	43	27	7th of 14	R1	—		1,524	Mukremin Jasar	15 ♦	
1989	a	2	2. division	26	10	7	9	54	43	27	7th of 14	R2	—		1,524	Mukremin Jasar	15 ♦	
1990	s	2	2. division	26	9	9	8	36	38	27	8th of 14 ↓	R2	—		1,433	Mukremin Jasar	12	
1990	a	2	2. division	26	9	9	8	36	38	27	8th of 14 ↓	R2	—		1,433	Mukremin Jasar	12	
1991		3	2. division øst	18	10	2	6	30	16	22	2nd of 10	R2	—		1,430	Søren Nielsen	6	
1991 autumn		3	2. division øst, grundspil	18	11	7	0	32	12	29	1st of 10	R3	—		1,703	Torben Hansen	9	
1992 spring		3	1. division, slutspil	14	7	2	5	21	15	16	4th of 8 ↑	R3	—		1,622	Morten Jensen	4	
1992 autumn		2	1. division, grundspil	18	7	3	8	42	33	17	6th of 10	R3	—		1,238	Aziz Corr; Søren Nielsen	6	
1993 spring		2	Kvalifikationsligaen, slutspil	14	3	5	6	19	31	14	8th of 8	R3	—		1,362	Aziz Corr	9	
1993 autumn		2	1. division, grundspil	18	9	4	5	44	31	22	2nd of 10	QF	—		1,575	Mukremin Jasar	10	
1994 spring		2	Kvalifikationsligaen, slutspil	14	7	5	2	30	17	26	2nd of 8 ↑	QF	—		2.326	Mukremin Jasar	10	
1994 autumn		1	Superliga, grundspil	18	4	0	14	21	47	8	10th of 10 ↓	R5	—		3,201 (Note: Ahead of the 1994 autumn season, the Divisionsforeningen make a decision to relocate the club's three autumn "home" matches on 30 October, 6 and 19 November 1994 against Silkeborg IF, Lyngby BK and Brøndby IF to Valby Idrætspark due to lack of a floodlight system at Sundby Idrætspark, but they are included in the home attendance average.)	Mukremin Jasar; Christian Clem	5	
1995 spring		2	Kvalifikationsligaen	14	3	3	8	15	22	16	6th of 8	R5	—		1.427	Jimmi Lüthje	5	
1995–96		2	1. division	30	10	10	10	40	40	40	7th of 16	R4	—		961	Francois Pignot	9	
1996–97		2	1. division	30	9	11	10	37	42	38	11th of 16	R3	—		837	Stefan Kofoed Hansen	5	
1997–98		2	1. division	30	11	4	15	42	50	37	10th of 16	R3	—		972	Anders Højlund	8	
1998–99		2	1. division	30	12	6	12	48	48	42	7th of 16	R2	—		1,155	Lars Brandt	10	
1999–2000		2	1. division	30	10	5	15	43	48	35	11th of 16	R5	—		902	Sammy Youssouf	10	
2000–01		2	1. division	30	8	7	15	43	64	31	14th of 16 ↓	R4	—		906	Mads Junker	16	
2001–02		3	2. division	30	9	7	14	49	59	34	12th of 16	R4	—		662	Thomas Maale	19	
2002–03		3	2. division	30	18	5	7	55	35	59	3rd of 16 ↑	R2	—		1,130	Thomas Maale	23	
2003–04		2	1. division	30	9	7	14	42	53	34	11th of 16	R2	—		1,042	Thomas Myssing Pedersen; Thomas Lundbye	6	
2004–05		2	1. division	30	12	10	8	50	39	46	8th of 16	QF	—		1,000	Andrew av Fløtum	9	
2005–06		2	1. division	30	15	4	11	54	55	49	5th of 16	R3	—		1,112	Martin Skov Petersen	11	
2006–07		2	1. division	30	6	6	18	35	78	24	16th of 16 ↓	R2	—		1,033	Thomas Christensen	7	
2007–08		3	2. division øst	30	20	3	7	63	34	63	2nd of 16 ↑ Won promotion playoffs	R2	—		1,303	Anders Jochumsen	19	
2008–09 (Note: The superstructure FC Amager was established on 1 July 2008, becoming the first team of Fremad Amager, before going bankrupt on 30 March 2009. The league license was returned to BK Fremad Amager. The club's "second best team" played in Series 1, Group 2 under the Copenhagen FA in the 2008 season, winning its group, hence earning promotion to Copenhagen Series in the 2009 spring season.)		Season / League; Season / Level / Division / P / W / D / L / F / A / Pts / Position; 2008 / 7→6 (Note: The half-season league tournament, Danmarksseriens Kvalifikationsrække, was dissolved during the 2008-season, which resulted in the lower ranking leagues, including Series 1 (KBU), being promoted from level 7 to level 6.) / KBUs Serie 1, gruppe 2 / 22 / 16 / 3 / 3 / 70 / 24 / 51 / 1st of 12 ↑; 2009 spring / 5 / Københavnsserien / 13 / 8 / 2 / 3 / 23 / 20 / 26 / 3rd of 14																
2009–10		5	Københavnsserien	26	17	4	5	66	31	55	1st of 14 ↑	DSQ (Note: BK Fremad Amager did not participate in the qualifying nor proper rounds of the 2009–10 Danish Cup due to their involvement in the superstructure FC Amager, that went bankrupt in March 2009.)	—		430 (Note: Due to the impact of the winter weather on the grass pitch of the stadium, two home matches (on 11 April 2010, against B.93's reserves and 27 April 2010, against BK Fremad Valby) were relocated to the artificial turf pitch behind the stadium stands, referred to as Kunstbane 1 (tribune).) (Note: Match data from 2 home league games, against BK Fremad Valby (27 April 2010) and BK Fix (9 May 2010), are missing and have not been included in the average attendance.)	Alhagie Babou Njie	13	
2010–11		4	Danmarksserien, pulje 1	26	15	6	5	50	28	51	2nd of 14 ↑	R1	—		844 (Note: Match data from 2 home league games, against Jægersborg BK (1 May 2011) and Gentofte-Vangede IF (4 June 2011), are missing and have not been included in the average attendance.)	Mads Rønne	15 ♦ (Note: Mads Rønne shared the topscorer title of the Denmark Series, Group 1 together with Kasper Wittrock Barslund (of FC Øresund) and Michael Konge (of Værløse BK), all scoring a total of 15 goals each.)	
2011–12		3	2. division øst	30	12	8	10	50	47	44	5th of 16	QR3	—		990	Olcay Senoglu	20	
2012–13		3	2. division øst	30	6	5	19	39	59	23	14th of 16; Won relegation playoffs	R1	—		901	Mads Rønne	12	
2013–14		3	2. division øst	30	15	6	9	76	55	51	3rd of 16	R1	Viasat Cup	GS	1,121	Nicolas Mortensen	20	
2014–15		3	2. division øst	30	16	8	6	55	35	56	4th of 16	R3	—		1,077	Nicolas Mortensen	15	
2015–16	a	3	2. division, pulje 2	14	9	2	3	30	16	29	2nd of 8	R1	—		838	Nicolas Mortensen	12 ♦	
2015–16	s	3	2. division, oprykningsspil	16	9	3	4	39	29	40 (10)	2nd of 12 ↑	R1	—		1,325	Olcay Senoglu	6	
2016–17		2	1. division	33	10	11	12	42	45	41	10th of 12	R3	—		1,137	Olcay Senoglu	12	
2017–18		2	1. division	33	11	7	15	27	42	40	9th of 12	R3	—		922 (Note: Two spring "home" matches on 4 and 18 March 2018 were relocated to Gentofte Sportspark in the 2017–18 season due to poor home ground facilities, but are included in the 2017–18 home attendance average.)	Jabar Sharza	10	
2018–19		2	1. division	33	13	11	9	42	45	50	5th of 12	R2	—		1,220	Lukas Ahlefeld Engel	9	
2019–20		2	1. division	33	13	10	10	45	45	49	4th of 12	R4	—		899 (Note: The 2019–20 season's home attendance average was affected by the COVID-19 pandemic in Denmark. The match against Kolding IF was played behind closed doors, while the remaining six home games were played with reduced stadium capacity.)	Kristoffer Munksgaard (Note: Kristoffer Munksgaard scored 5 goals for Næstved BK in the fall and netted 8 goals for BK Fremad Amager in the spring, finishing the 2019–20 season with a total of 13 league goals.); Réda Rabeï	8	
2020–21		2	1. division (kvalifikationsspil)	32	10	5	17	47	41	35	8th of 12	QF	—		518 (Note: The 2020–21 season's home attendance average was affected by the COVID-19 pandemic in Denmark. Matchday 17 to 25 were played behind closed doors, while the remaining home games were played with reduced stadium capacity.)	Kristoffer Munksgaard	11	
2021–22		2	1. division (kvalifikationsspil)	32	9	6	17	39	62	33	10th of 12	R3	—		1,257	Kristoffer Munksgaard (Note: Kristoffer Munksgaard scored 8 goals for BK Fremad Amager in the fall and netted 1 goal for FC Helsingør in the spring, finishing the 2021–22 season with a total of 9 league goals.)	8	
2022–23		2	1. division (kvalifikationsspil)	32	10	4	18	38	60	34	11th of 12 ↓	R4	—		1,360	Lucas Janus Ravn-Haren	6	
2023–24		3	2. division (kvalifikationsspil)	32	12	5	15	42	46	41	7th of 12	R1	—		958 (Note: Match data from 1 home league game, against Hellerup IK (26 April 2024) is missing and have not been included in the average attendance.)	Kasper Nygaard Andersen	10	
2024–25		3	2. division (oprykningsspil)	32	16	7	9	42	37	55	3rd of 12	R3	—		1,321	Christoffer Boateng	12	
2025–26		3	2. division (kvalifikationsspil)	32	15	6	11	36	35	45 (Note: The club were deducted six points on 28 January 2026 for breaching DBU financial regulations. The ownership company (Amager Elite Aps) that began the season in control of the club entered reconstruction proceedings on 13 January 2026. Under DBU rules, the new company that assumed the club’s activities in autumn 2025 remained responsible for the previous company’s obligations, resulting in the points deduction.)	7th of 12	R1	—		1,040	Christoffer Boateng	6	
2026–27		3	2. division	—N/a	—N/a	—N/a	—N/a	—N/a	—N/a	—N/a	—N/a	R1	—		—N/a	—N/a	—N/a	
