= Rasmus Katholm =

Danish footballer (born 1981)

Personal information
- Date of birth: 22 June 1981 (age 45)
- Place of birth: Århus, Denmark
- Height: 1.75 m (5 ft 9 in)
- Position: Forward

Youth career
- Vivild IF
- Randers Freja

Senior career*
Years	Team	Apps	(Gls)
1999–2002	Randers Freja	31	(10)
2002–2005	Randers FC	68	(25)
2005–2006	Brabrand IF	30	(18)
2006–2007	AGF	22	(5)
2007–2009	FC Fredericia	54	(38)
2009–2011	AC Horsens	0	(0)
2011–2012	FC Skanderborg		
2012	Hobro IK		
- * Club domestic league appearances and goals

Rasmus Katholm (born 22 June 1981) is a Danish professional football forward who currently is a free agent. He has played in the Danish Superliga with Randers FC.
