= Nicolas Mortensen =

Danish footballer (born 1994)

Personal information
- Date of birth: 26 April 1994 (age 32)
- Place of birth: Denmark
- Height: 1.80 m (5 ft 11 in)
- Position: Striker

Team information
- Current team: AB Tårnby
- Number: 10

Youth career
- AB70
- –2013: Brøndby

College career
Years	Team	Apps	(Gls)
2014	Lynn Fighting Knights		

Senior career*
Years	Team	Apps	(Gls)
2013–2014	Fremad Amager	27	(4)
2015–2017	Fremad Amager	27	(4)
2017–2020	FC Helsingør	57	(15)
2020–2021	Östers IF	45	(16)
2022–2024	Trelleborgs FF	52	(19)
2024–	AB Tårnby	0	(0)
- * Club domestic league appearances and goals as of 15 July 2024

Nicolas Mortensen (born 26 April 1994) is a Danish professional footballer who plays as a striker for AB Tårnby.

== Early life ==
Mortensen joined the Lynn Fighting Knights in the United States, helping the team win the league.

== Career ==
In 2017, Mortensen signed for Danish top flight side FC Helsingør, where he was regarded as one of the club's most important players. He suffered two consecutive relegations with them from the Danish top flight to the Danish third tier. Before the 2020 season, he signed for Swedish side Östers IF, where he suffered an injury. Before the 2022 season, he signed for Swedish side Trelleborgs FF.

Due to a lack of playing time, Mortensen had his contract with Trelleborg terminated in June 2024, six months before expiration. On July 17, it was confirmed that Mortensen moved to Denmark Series club AB Tårnby, where his former teammate from Fremad Amager, Mohammed Abdalas, had just been hired as head coach.

== Style of play ==
Mortensen mainly operates as a striker and is known for his strength.

== Personal life ==
Besides playing football, Mortensen has enjoyed brewing coffee.
