= Andreas Heimer =

Danish footballer (born 1997)

Personal information
- Full name: Andreas Heimer Hansen
- Date of birth: 10 December 1997 (age 28)
- Place of birth: Copenhagen, Denmark
- Height: 1.83 m (6 ft 0 in)
- Position: Midfielder

Team information
- Current team: B.93
- Number: 20

Youth career
- FB
- KB
- B.93

Senior career*
Years	Team	Apps	(Gls)
2015–2017	B.93		
2017–2019	Thisted	29	(3)
2019	Silkeborg	13	(0)
2020	Næstved	13	(2)
2020–	B.93	102	(2)
- * Club domestic league appearances and goals as of 3 October 2026

Andreas Heimer Hansen (born 10 December 1997) is a Danish professional footballer who plays as a midfielder for Danish 2nd Division club B.93.

== Career ==
=== B.93 ===
Heimer started playing football at Frederiksberg Boldklub, better known as FB, before joining KB for a short period and later B.93 at the age of 14. Heimer made his first-team debut for B.93 on 6 June 2015 at the age of 17 years, 5 months and 27 days, making him one of the youngest debutants in the club's history. After over 70 first team games for B.93, Heimer left the club to join Thisted FC in January 2018.

=== Silkeborg ===
After a year at Danish 1st Division club Thisted FC, Silkeborg IF announced on 30 January 2019, that Heimer had joined the club on a contract for the rest of the season.

=== Næstved ===
After leaving Silkeborg IF in December 2019, Heimer signed with Næstved BK on 22 January 2020 on a free agent. Heimer confirmed on 26 July 2020, that his contract with Næstved had been terminated.

=== Return to B.93 ===
After being released by Næstved, Heimer returned to B.93. His contract with the club was extended in October 2022.
