= Morten Juul Hansen =

Danish footballer (born 1977)

Morten Juul Hansen (born 16 March 1977) is a Danish football player, who currently plays for Gentofte VI.

== Career ==
He most prominently played 16 games for Lyngby Boldklub in the top-flight Danish Superliga championship in the 2001-02 Superliga season. He can play as both a defender and a midfielder, and is most famous for being one of the players who stayed in Lyngby Boldklub after the club was declared bankrupt. Morten Juul Hansen is nicknamed "Rubber" due to having impressive aerial abilities in spite of his unintimidating height, rubber referring to his jumping capacity.

After Lyngby Boldklub was promoted to the Danish Superliga in the summer 2007, Juul Hansen received some media attention when he was admitted to hospital with a BAC of 0,4% after celebrating the promotion.
