= Nikolaj Hagelskjær =

Danish footballer (born 1990)

Personal information
- Full name: Nikolaj Hagelskjær Pedersen
- Date of birth: 6 May 1990 (age 36)
- Position: Defender

Team information
- Current team: Middelfart G&BK

Senior career*
Years	Team	Apps	(Gls)
2010–2012	Vejle Boldklub	7	(0)
2011	→ Stjarnan (loan)	21	(0)
2012–2016	FC Fredericia	115	(11)
2016–2018	Esbjerg fB	57	(2)
2019–	Middelfart G&BK	0	(0)
- * Club domestic league appearances and goals as of 17 January 2019

Nikolaj Hagelskjær Pedersen (born 6 May 1990) is a Danish professional footballer who plays for Middelfart G&BK in the Danish 2nd Division, as a defender.

== Career ==
Hagelskjær has played for Vejle Boldklub, Stjarnan, FC Fredericia and Esbjerg fB.
