= Anders Holvad =

Danish footballer (born 1990)

Personal information
- Full name: Anders Sølvsten Holvad
- Date of birth: 24 June 1990 (age 36)
- Place of birth: Vivild, Denmark
- Height: 1.87 m (6 ft 2 in)
- Position: Forward

Team information
- Current team: Aarhus Fremad (player-assistant coach)
- Number: 16

Youth career
- Vivild IF
- Randers

Senior career*
Years	Team	Apps	(Gls)
2009–2010	Randers Freja		
2010	Vivild IF		
2011	Viborg	1	(0)
2011–2014	Kjellerup		
2014–2016	Brabrand		
2016–2017	Hobro	41	(10)
2017–2022	Fredericia	132	(32)
2022	KÍ Klaksvík	13	(1)
2023	Fredericia	16	(1)
2023–	Aarhus Fremad	73	(14)

Managerial career
- 2024–: Aarhus Fremad (player-assistant coach)
- * Club domestic league appearances and goals as of 2 June 2026

Anders Sølvsten Holvad (born 24 June 1990) is a Danish professional footballer who plays for Danish 1st Division club Aarhus Fremad as a forward.

== Career ==
=== Early career ===
A prospect from the Randers FC academy, Holvad appeared for reserve team Randers Freja in the third-tier 2nd Division before moving back to his childhood club, Vivild IF competing in the fifth-tier Jutland Series in March 2010. After the club suffered relegation to the seventh-tier Series 1, he had a successful trial with Viborg FF, but only played there for six months, making one appearance in the second-tier 1st Division. He then played for Kjellerup IF before moving to Brabrand IF in January 2014.

=== Hobro ===
On 3 February 2016, Holvad signed a six-month contract with Hobro competing in the Danish Superliga. The move came to fruition after a strong first half to the season for Brabrand, where he was top goalscorer for the team in the third-tier 2nd Division. He signed a one-year contract extension with the club in July 2016, a full-time professional deal for the first time in his career, after Hobro had suffered relegation to the second-tier 1st Division. Holvad started the 2016–17 season in strong fashion, resulting in six goals in 11 appearances. He was, however, benched towards to end of the season despite being the team's top goalscorer. He finished the season with 30 league appearances in which he scored nine goals, as Hobro reached promotion to the Superliga. In total, he made 42 appearances for Hobro with 10 goals to his name.

=== Fredericia ===
On 13 June 2017, Holvad signed a two-year contract with 1st Division club FC Fredericia as a free agent. He immediately established himself as a starter and key player for the club, playing mostly as a winger, after the club had initially brought him in as a forward.

On 23 November 2018, Holvad signed a five-year contract extension, keeping him in Fredericia until 2023.

=== KÍ Klaksvík ===
On 10 June 2022 Faroese club KÍ Klaksvík confirmed that Holvad had joined the club on a deal until the end of 2023.

He made his European debut on 6 July 2022, coming on as a late substitute for Claes Kronberg in a 3–0 loss in the UEFA Champions League qualifiers to Bodø/Glimt.

=== Return to Fredericia ===
On 28 January 2023, Holvad returned to Denmark, signing a deal until June 2024 with his former club, FC Fredericia. He left the club by mutual agreement on 31 August 2023.

=== Aarhus Fremad ===
On 31 August 2023, Holvad moved to Aarhus Fremad. In June 2024, Holvad became an assistant coach at the club, also continuing to play.

== Honours ==
Hobro

- 1st Division: 2016–17
