= Kim Elgaard =

Danish footballer (born 1991)

Personal information
- Full name: Kim Elgaard Dahl
- Date of birth: September 24, 1991 (age 35)
- Place of birth: Denmark
- Position: Midfielder

Senior career*
Years	Team	Apps	(Gls)
2010–2011	Vejle Boldklub	3	(0)
2011–2013	FC Fredericia	36	(2)
2013–2014	Hobro IK	13	(0)
2014–2018	Vejle Boldklub	63	(2)
2018	United Victory		
2018–2020	Middelfart Boldklub	35	(7)
- * Club domestic league appearances and goals

Kim Elgaard Dahl (born 24 September 1991) is a Danish former footballer who played as a midfielder.

== Early life ==
As a youth player, Elgaard joined the youth academy of Danish side Vejle Boldklub. He was described as "experienced great success on the U19 league team". He received interest from Greek side Panathinaikos FC. He played under Swedish manager Mats Gren and Danish manager Viggo Jensen.

== Career ==
In 2011, Elgaard signed for Danish side FC Fredericia. In 2013, he signed for Danish side Hobro IK. In 2014, he returned to Danish side Vejle Boldklub. He helped the club achieve promotion. In 2018, he signed for Maldivian side United Victory. In 2018, he signed for Danish side Middelfart Boldklub. He was regarded as one of the club's most important players.

== Style of play ==
Elgaard mainly operated as a midfielder. He operated as a striker and winger early in his career.

== Personal life ==
Elgaard has been friends with Danish footballer Jesper Fleckner. He has a daughter. After retiring from professional football, he has worked as a teacher at a school in Denmark.
