= Amager Boldspil-Union =

Governing body for men's association football on Amager, Denmark

- Abbreviation: ABU
- Formation: 13 March 1912; 114 years ago
- Dissolved: 1940s
- Purpose: Football association
- Location: Amager
- Chairman: E. Ebertsen (1912); Aage Petersen (1917)

Amager Boldspil-Union, shortened to ABU, was a subregional governing body for men's association football on the island of Amager, Denmark. The Amager Football Association governed the league and cup tournaments for the official championship of Amager, known as ABUs Amager-Turnering (or Amagermesterskabsturneringen) and ABUs Pokalturnering (or Amagerpokalturneringen) since its inception in March 1912. In 1916, the association's clubs formed the regional Københavns Forstadsklubbers Boldspil-Union (KFBU). Representative teams, either composed of individual clubs and a selection of players from several teams, referred to as Amager, competed in KFBU tournaments (referred to as Bydelsturneringen) or in exhibition matches against other representative teams and clubs. The subregional football association published a member's magazine known as Unionsbladet, which evolved into the KFBU magazine known as Fodboldbladet.

== History ==
With the intention of creating better a framework for the arrangements of private matches, BK Fremad Amager took the initiative of inviting all present clubs on the island of Amager to a first briefing in November 1911 – with the exception of B 1908 due to the club being considered a much stronger side than the Amager-based teams. The representatives went back to their individual clubs to discuss the formation of a local football association, which resulted in a new meeting in January 1912, in which B 1908 was now invited to. The association was founded on 13 March 1912 at a meeting held by four clubs, Dragør BK, BK Fremad Amager, B 1908 and IK 99 (the football department of IK 99 was also known as B 99). Each club would got two representatives on the first governing board, which had E. Ebertsen (BK Fremad Amager) as chairman, Hans Svane (Dragør BK) as vice-chairman, O. Andersen (IK 99) as cashier and Harry Osbæck (B 1908) as secretary. Each club had their own home grounds assigned by the local municipality. The formation of Amager Boldspil-Union happened in the wake of KBU's conflicts in 1911 regarding the constellation of power and the number of votes between the baneejende klubber and the fælledklubberne.

Shortly after its foundation, the association announced two league tournaments, one for first team seniors (1. Senior-Hold) and one for reserve players (2. Senior-Hold) each split into a spring and fall section with a silver trophy as the perpetual prize, including a cup tournament held at the end of the season. The first league trophy was given to B 1908 for winning the tournament for a second time in 1913, and the second trophy was also won by B 1908 in 1916 following three consecutive championships. The first league season under the auspices of the Amager Football Association began play the following month with its four founding members as participants in both the first team and reserve leagues, mirroring the tournament rules of Kjøbenhavns Boldspil-Union (KBU). Three of the clubs also featured a team in the youth football tournament, while some clubs, such as BK Fremad Amager, featured several younger players in the senior squad compared to many of the other league teams. The first league fixture was between BK Fremad Amager and B 1908 and took place on 14 April 1912 at BK Fremad Amager's home ground next to Cyklistpavillonen Alhambra on Amager Landevej (now Sundbyvester Plads next to Amagerbrogade). The league and cup tournaments would have the matches be refereed by a footballer or member of one of the other league clubs not involved in the fixture.

By mid-June 1912, Sundby KFUM and Kastrup BK (exited between 1908 and 1927) had joined the association and would soon take part in the tournament matches played on Sundays. BK Sylvia joined the Copenhagen FA for a short period (1908–1909) in a cooperation with neighbouring BK Tjalfe, before joining the Amager FA in 1913, participating with their own first team in the league tournaments until 1920. BK Herles and Sundby BK also joined the association ahead of the 1913 season. Dragør BK left the association after the second season, due to attempts from the association at refusing to give Dragør BK permission to play matches at their own home ground. BK Hafnia and BK Sport joined in the summer of 1915, taking part in the 1915–16 season. In 1915, Amager Boldspil Union asked if BK Standard wanted to become a member in 1915, which the club did in 1916, beginning play in the 1916–17 reserve league season. By 1920, the association had been reduced to five clubs (BK Sylvia, B 1908, BK Fremad Amager, Islands Brygges IF and BK Standard) totalling 400 footballers, a decrease from eight members at the end of the previous tournament.

On 1 October 1916, the Amager FA published its first edition of their member's magazine with Emanuel Johansen (BK Sylvia) as the editor-in-chief, named Unionsbladet, containing articles, related cases and discussions, historical information, match reviews and statistics. The magazine would later merge with the magazine published by Valby Boldspil-Union (VBU), known as Fodboldbladet, and evolve into the KFBU magazine known as Fodboldbladet. The association also arranged other sports events, such as running competitions.

Throughout the association's first eight years, they had several fruitless negotiations with different civilian and military authorities to have the conditions of their playing grounds improved, which caused the dissolution of at least two clubs in 1920. Due to a combination of the association being too narrow in its membership and the Copenhagen Football Association (KBU) refusing to accept new members, in April 1916 BK Fremad Amager via Amager Boldspil-Union took the initiative to form a larger football association, known as De københavnske Forstadsklubbers Boldspil Union (KFBU) in 1916. The KFBU would embrace association football clubs in the suburbs of Copenhagen; including Nørrebro, Frederiksberg, Valby, Nordre Birk and Amager, hence involving the associations Amager Boldspil-Union (ABU), Nørrebros Boldspil-Union (NBU, joined later on), Valby Boldspil-Union (VBU) and Nordre Birks Boldspil-Union (NBBU). The KFBU arranged larger tournaments and held matches between representative squads of each suburb, referred to as Bydelsturneringen, and later played matches with a selected squad with players from each of KFBU's member clubs against the representative team of Fælleden.

When the members of Amager Boldspil-Union started joining the Copenhagen FA in late summer of 1920, its league tournament ended, but its cup tournaments continued to be held annually in the summer months for several seasons. Amager Boldspil-Union ceased to exist sometime in the 1940s.

== Amagermesterskabsturneringen ==
=== 1912 ABUs Amager-Turnering ===
In the debut season for the association's league tournaments, B 1908 wins the competitions aimed at seniors 1 and 2 including youth (junior). The first competitive league match for the League Championship of Amager was a clash between B 1908 and BK Fremad Amager, which B 1908 won with the score 13–0, held on 14 April 1912, which was followed by a league match between B 1899 (IK 99) and Dragør BK at B 1899's home ground, won by B 99 with the score 3–2. The league standings at the end of the spring season had B 1908 in first place with 6 points, BK Fremad Amager in second place with 3 points and IK 99 in third place with 2 points. B 1908 also won the other two league tournaments.

League table

Pos	Team	Pld	W	D	L	GF	GA	GR	Pts
1	B 1908 (C)	6	6	0	0	0	0	—	12
2	BK Fremad Amager	6	2	2	2	0	0	—	6
3	IK 99	6	1	3	2	0	0	—	5
4	Dragør BK	6	0	1	5	0	0	—	1

Rules for classification: 1) Points; 2) Head-to-head points; 3) Goal ratio
(C) Champions

Results

Home \ Away	B08	BFA	I99	DBK
B 1908	—			
BK Fremad Amager	0–13	—		4–1
IK 99	0–3		—	3–2
Dragør BK	1–6	1–1		—

Legend: Blue = home team win; Yellow = draw; Red = away team win.

=== 1913 Amager-Turnering ===
BK Sylvia won the association's top-flight league in the 1913 season. Last season's four teams were joined by the three new members, BK Sylvia, BK Herles and Sundby BK.

League table

Pos	Team	Pld	W	D	L	GF	GA	GR	Pts
1	BK Sylvia (C)	0	0	0	0	0	0	—	0
2	BK Herles	0	0	0	0	0	0	—	0
3	BK Fremad Amager	0	0	0	0	0	0	—	0
4	B 1908	0	0	0	0	0	0	—	0
5	Sundby BK	0	0	0	0	0	0	—	0
6	IK 99	0	0	0	0	0	0	—	0
7	Dragør BK	0	0	0	0	0	0	—	0

Rules for classification: 1) Points; 2) Head-to-head points; 3) Goal ratio
(C) Champions

Results

Home \ Away	SYL	HER	BFA	B08	SUN	I99	DBK
BK Sylvia	—				5–0	6–2	
BK Herles		—					
BK Fremad Amager			—				
B 1908	0–0			—			
Sundby BK				1–8	—		4–2
IK 99						—	2–4
Dragør BK				0–2			—

Legend: Blue = home team win; Yellow = draw; Red = away team win.

=== 1915 Amager-Turnering ===
In the spring of 1915, BK Fremad Amager won all three league tournaments.

=== 1916 Amager-Turnering ===
In 1916, the first team and the reserve squad of B 1908 won their respective league tournaments, acquiring the perpetual trophy as the club's permanent procession.

=== 1916–17 Amager-Turnering ===
League table

Pos	Team	Pld	W	D	L	GF	GA	GR	Pts
1	BK Sylvia (C)	0	0	0	0	0	0	—	0
2	B 1908	0	0	0	0	0	0	—	0
3	BK Hafnia	0	0	0	0	0	0	—	0
4	BK Fremad Amager	0	0	0	0	0	0	—	0
5	BK Sport	0	0	0	0	0	0	—	0

Rules for classification: 1) Points; 2) Head-to-head points; 3) Goal ratio
(C) Champions

Results

Home \ Away	SYL	B08	HAF	BFA	SPO
BK Sylvia	—				
B 1908		—			
BK Hafnia			—		
BK Fremad Amager				—	
BK Sport					—

Legend: Blue = home team win; Yellow = draw; Red = away team win.

=== 1917–18 Amager-Turnering ===
BK Sylvia won the league in the 1917–18 season.

=== 1919–20 Amager-Turnering ===
BK Sylvia won the league in the 1919–20 season.

== Amagerpokalturneringen ==
The rules in 1912 stipulated, that 30 minutes of extra time was added to a cup match, if the teams were level after full time, while the rules in 1928 stipulated that a replay match would be scheduled, if a match was tied after full time.

=== 1912 (spring) ABUs Pokalturnering ===
Semi-finals

2 June 1912	BK Fremad Amager	1–4	IK 99	Banen ved Cyklistpavillonen Alhambra, Copenhagen
12:00 CET

Final

16 June 1912	IK 99	1–10	B 1908	Boldbanen i Lejren ved Amager Boulevard, Copenhagen

=== 1912 (fall) ABUs Pokalturnering ===
Semi-finals

October 1912	IK 99	3–1	BK Fremad Amager

20 October 1912	Dragør BK	7–1	B 1908

Final

3 November 1912	IK 99	2–1 (a.e.t.)	Dragør BK	Banen i Lejren ved Amager Fælled
12:00 CET	? 1/2h', 119'		? 1/2h'

=== 1913 (spring) ABUs Pokalturnering ===
Quarter-finals

29 June 1913	Dragør BK	v	B 1908	Banen ved Dragør, Dragør
12:00 CET

29 June 1913	BK Herles	v	IK 99	Banen i Lejren på Amager Fælled

Semi-finals

6 July 1913	B 1908	4–0	IK 99

6 July 1913	BK Sylvia	3–1	Sundby BK

Final

13 July 1913	BK Sylvia	v	B 1908	B.93's Bane
13:30 CET

=== 1928 Amagerklubbernes Pokalturnering ===
...

8 August 1928	BK Standard	4–1	BK Sylvia	Sundby Idrætspark (Note: The match between B 1908 and Christianshavns BK was played at Sundby Idrætspark's exhibition field, while the game between BK Standard and BK Sylvia took place on a field next to that.), Copenhagen
18:45 CET	Edvin Petersen 2', 17', 68'; Aage Christensen 22'; Valdemar Christiansen 27' (o.g.)

8 August 1928	B 1908	3–0	Christianshavns BK	Sundby Idrætspark, Copenhagen
18:45 CET	Hemming Nielsen 65'; James Nygaard 69'; Harald Jørgensen 89'			Referee: Frederik Jensen

17 August 1928	BK Standard	2–10	BK Fremad Amager	Copenhagen
18:30 CET

Final

22 August 1928	BK Fremad Amager	4–5	B 1908	Sundby Idrætspark, Copenhagen
18:30 CET	Bernhard Henriksen 7', 65'; Henning Nielsen 23' (pen.); Ejler Krak 30'		Vardo Larsen 5'; Bernhard Nielsen 20', 43'; Harald Jørgensen 33', 87'	Referee: Frederik Jensen

=== 1929 Amagerklubbernes Pokalturnering ===
A total of six clubs participated in this edition of the cup, namely BK Fremad Amager, B 1908, BK Standard, BK Sylvia, BK Olympia 1921 and Christianshavns BK, that took place before the start of the regional league tournaments. Admissions were taken at the matches, that were all held at Sundby Idrætspark.

Quarter-finals

8 August 1929	B 1908 (4)	5–1	BK Standard (4)	Sundby Idrætspark (Note: The match between B 1908 and BK Standard was played at Sundby Idrætspark's exhibition field, while the game between BK Olympia and Christianshavns BK took place on a field next to that.), Copenhagen
18:45 CET	Vardo Larsen 1h', 2h', 2h' Emanuel Holm 1h' Bernhard Nielsen 1h'		Aage Christensen 2h' (pen.)

8 August 1929	BK Olympia 1921 (5)	8–1	Christianshavns BK (5)	Sundby Idrætspark, Copenhagen
18:45 CET	? Bagger 1h', 2h', 2h' Lauritz Nielsen 1h', 2h' Andreas Frederiksen 1h', 2h' Kai Jensen 1h'		Axel Nielsen 2h'

Semi-finals

2 August 1929	BK Sylvia (4)	4–1	BK Fremad Amager (4)	Sundby Idrætspark, Copenhagen
19:00 CET	Edwin Nielsen 1h', 2h' Rob. Skog 1h' Gunnar Petersen 2h'		? 2h'	Attendance: 500; Referee: Frederik Jensen

14 August 1929	BK Olympia 1921 (5)	2–8	B 1908 (4)	Sundby Idrætspark, Copenhagen
18:30 CET	? o.g.' Kai Jensen 1h' Lauritz Nielsen 1h'		Vardo Larsen 15', 1h', 1h', 2h', 2h' Emanuel Holm 1h', 2h' Emil "Krølle" Christensen 2h'

Final

18 August 1929	BK Sylvia (4)	0–1	B 1908 (4)	Sundby Idrætspark, Copenhagen
13:00 CET			Vardo Larsen 1h'

=== 1931 ABUs Pokalturnering ===
BK Fremad Amager did not participate in the cup tournament this season.

=== 1935 ABUs Pokalturnering ===
On 20 August 1935 18:15 a semi-final match was played involving Amager Kammeraterne at Sundby Idrætspark
