= Danny Andersen =

Danish footballer (born 1983)

Personal information
- Date of birth: 29 January 1983 (age 43)
- Place of birth: Helsingør, Denmark
- Height: 1.72 m (5 ft 8 in)
- Position: Forward

Youth career
- HIK
- Udinese

Senior career*
Years	Team	Apps	(Gls)
2006–2007	HIK	90	(40)
2007–2008	Lyngby	15	(0)
2008–2010	BK Frem	12	(3)
2010–2012	Helsingør IF		(21)
2012–2013	BSV		
2013–2015	Fremad Amager		
2015–2017	BK Frem		
2017–2018	FA 2000	9	(5)
- * Club domestic league appearances and goals

Danny Andersen (born 29 January 1983) is a Danish former professional footballer who played as a forward. After retiring from football, he transitioned into coaching and was appointed assistant coach of FA 2000.

== Career ==
Andersen demonstrated consistent scoring ability throughout his career. At Helsingør IF, he scored 21 goals during the 2003–04 season and was named Player of the Year. He then joined HIK (HIK), where he played for three seasons. During his time at the club, he trialled with Belgian Pro League club Gent, appearancing in a friendly against Maccabi Haifa. Despite HIK's struggles in the Danish 1st Division, Andersen maintained his form, scoring 15 goals in his final season and ranking high on the league's top scorer list. As a result, he moved to Danish Superliga club Lyngby, coached by Kasper Hjulmand.

In 2008, Andersen joined BK Frem, where he played until 2010, where he moved to hometown club Elite 3000 in the Danish 2nd Division. After two years, he signed with BSV, before moving on to Fremad Amager halfway through the season, in January 2013. He rejoined Frem in 2015 but was sidelined by injuries for much of 2016, limiting him to a few appearances for the reserve team. Andersen left Frem in 2017 and joined FA 2000 in the Denmark Series, coached by his former Fremad Amager manager, Tim Ilsø.

== Coaching career ==
In August 2017, Andersen was appointed assistant coach to new head coach Jesper Pedersen at his former club FA 2000.

== Playing style ==
Andersen was known for his work ethic, mobility, and ability to press opponents. His speed and positional awareness allowed him to create scoring opportunities for himself and his team. He had a powerful and decisive shot and excelled at finding space between opposing midfielders and defenders. His intelligent movement and anticipation made him an effective forward.

== Personal life ==
Danny Andersen's twin brother, Ronni Andersen, also played for Elite 3000 Helsingør.
