= Boldklubben 1908 =

Danish football club

- Full name: Boldklubben 1908
- Nickname: Ama'rkanerne
- Founded: 24 May 1908; 118 years ago
- Ground: Sundby Idrætspark, Copenhagen
- Capacity: 7,200 (2,500 seated)
- Manager: Lasse Theis
- League: Denmark Series (V)
- 2021–22: Denmark Series – Group 2, 8th of 10
- Website: http://www.b1908.com/
Home colours	Away colours

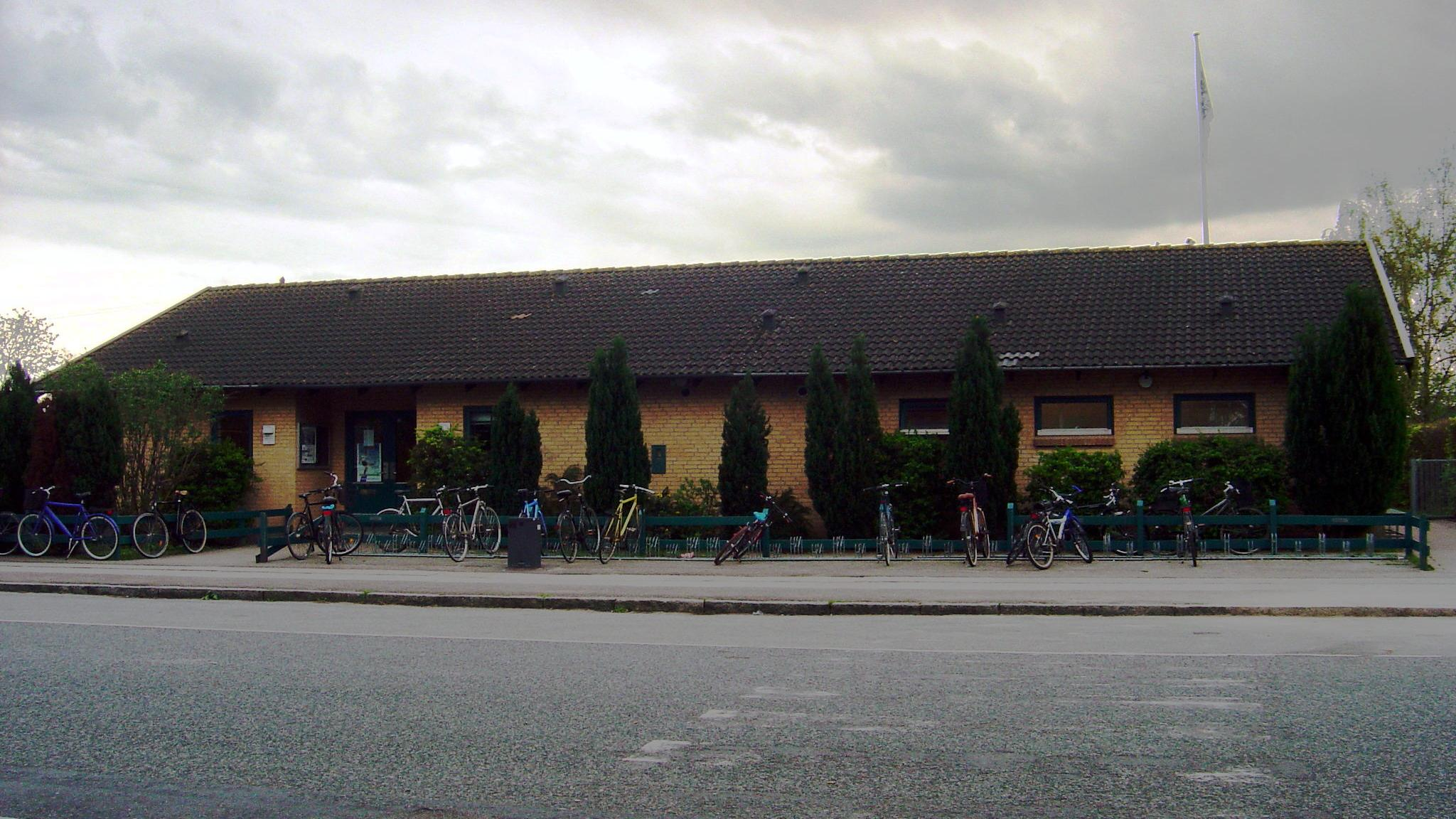
The club house for Boldklubben 1908 located in the south end outside of Sundby Idrætspark.

Boldklubben 1908 (B.1908 for short) is a Danish football club based in the district of Amager Vest, Copenhagen. The club's first team play in Denmark Series, the fifth tier of Danish football. The club plays their home matches at Sundby Idrætspark, which has a capacity of 7,200. Founded in 1908, the club was a part of Danish second-tier football through the 1930s, had a spell in the top-flight War Tournaments during World War II, before experiencing a revival in the 1980s and 1990s, entering the third-tier Danish 2nd Division.

== History ==
The club was founded on 24 May 1908 by several boys among them the four Jansen brothers - Hans, Jens, Crilles, and Edvard - aged 10 to 15 years old, choosing Harry Osbeck as the first chairman. The club's first match was won 3–0 against Thingvalla. In 1912, the team was co-founder of regional football association, Amager Boldspil-Union (ABU), winning the first tournament under the new association's auspices.

== Team colours and crest ==
Boldklubben 1908's team colours are black and white. The club's current logo was introduced in May 2014 and resembles the club's first logo.

2nd logo, 19??–2014

3rd logo, 2014–present

== Club's honours ==
=== Domestic ===
==== National leagues ====
- Denmark Series
  - Runners-up (1): 1983
  - Group 1 Winners (3): 1983, 1995, 2008–09

==== Regional leagues ====
- Copenhagen Series (DBUK level 1)
  - Winners (4): 1944–45, 1945–46, 1955–56, 1982
  - Runner-up (7): 1947–48, 1948–49, 1958, 1960, 1963, 1969, 1993
- Amagermesterskabet (ABU level 1)
  - Winners (1): 1912

==== Cups ====
- Forstadsklubbernes Pokalturnering
  - Winners (2): 1918, 1919
- KBUs Sommerpokalturnering
  - Winners (3): 1933, 1935, 1940
  - Runners-up (1): 1934
- Fælledklubbernes Pokalturnering
  - Winners (1): 1927
- Amager Boldspil-Unions Pokalturnering (ABU)
  - Winners (1): 1927, 1928

== Achievements ==
- 4 seasons in the Highest Danish League
- 8 seasons in the Second Highest Danish League
- 13 seasons in the Third Highest Danish League
