= Olcay Senoglu =

Danish footballer (born 1984)

Personal information
- Date of birth: 10 May 1984 (age 42)
- Place of birth: Denmark
- Positions: Midfielder; forward

Senior career*
Years	Team	Apps	(Gls)
-2004	FC Nordsjælland	14	(1)
- * Club domestic league appearances and goals

Olcay Senoglu (born 10 May 1984 in Denmark) is a Danish retired footballer.

== Career ==
At the age of 18, Senoglu scored on his Danish Superliga debut for Nordsjælland against OB, but he soon left due to pressure to play from his family, a decision he later regretted. After playing for Koge, he signed for Turkish club Gencerbirligi. However, he could not adapt to the professional environment, and was seen as a foreigner despite speaking Turkish fluently. By age 24, Senoglu finished his high school education to prepare for his retirement. From early 2009 to summer 2010, he had transferred five times. While playing in the Danish lower leagues, he worked as a teacher and set up a business - Olsen Sports Travel.

After playing for ten clubs in fifteen years by 2016, Senoglu said that he thought he had a mercenary reputation, but cited lack of patience and the desire for playing at the highest level as the reasons for his number of clubs.

== Personal life ==
Senoglu was arranged to be married to his cousin but divorced after a year and a half, causing him to be estranged with his family asked from his parents.
