= 2006 FIFA World Cup Organizing Committee =

The 2006 FIFA World Cup Organizing Committee (German: Organisationkomitee, OK) organized the World Cup in Germany. President of OK was Franz Beckenbauer, who also acted as the official representative and chairman of the German World Cup bid.

First Vice President and Vice President of the World Cup Committee was Horst R. Schmidt, the general secretary of the German Football Association (German: Deutscher Fußball-Bund, DFB). The responsibility of the Executive Vice President of the OK varied and included play and competitive technical matters, stadiums, ticket sales, transportation, safety, regulatory affairs, human resources, finances, planning and control, medical care, administration and secretariat.

Wolfgang Niersbach was the executive vice president and press chief officer of the World Cup committee. Niersbach was responsible for marketing, press and public relations, accreditation, information technology, media and telecommunications, events and the crew's quarters.

Vice-President of the OK was Fedor Radmann until 2003 and then Theo Zwanziger. His responsibilities included the general organization, legal, finances and also personnel decisions leading to the World Cup.

The organizing committee was controlled by the Supervisory Board and the Board of Trustees. On the Supervisory Board were well-known personalities such as Federal Minister of the Interior Wolfgang Schäuble, the former Federal Minister of the Interior Otto Schily, president of the German Football Association Gerhard Mayer-Vorfelder, Thomas Bach from the International Olympic Committee, Werner Hackmann president of the Deutsche Fußball Liga, and former footballer Günter Netzer as sports rights marketer.

== Supervisory Board ==
- Gerhard Mayer-Vorfelder, DFB President, OK Chairman
- Wolfgang Schäuble, Federal Minister of the Interior, OK Vice-Chairman
- Otto Schily, former federal Minister of the Interior
- Thomas Bach, IOC
- Günter Netzer, Infront Sports & Media AG
- Werner Hackmann, president of the Deutsche Fußball Liga (DFL)
- Wilfried Straub, Managing Chairman DFL
- Engelbert Nelle, 1st Vice President (Amateurs), DFB
- Heinrich Schmidhuber, DFB treasurer
- Manfred Maus, Chairman OBI AG

== Board of trustees ==
- Manfred von Richthofen, former President of the German Sports Federation
- Egidius Braun, DFB honorary president
- Klaus Steinbach, President of the Deutscher Olympischer Sportbund
- Hans Ludwig Grüschow, President of the German Sports Aid
- Herbert Hainer, CEO of Adidas-Salomon AG
- Erich Schumann, CEO Westdeutsche Allgemeine Zeitung
- Fritz Pleitgen, director of the Westdeutscher Rundfunk
- Michel Platini, member of the FIFA Executive Committee, member of the Organizing Committee for the FIFA World Cup Germany 2006
- Roman Herzog, former President of Germany
- Lennart Johansson, President of UEFA, member of the FIFA Executive Committee, chairman of the Organizing Committee for the FIFA World Cup Germany 2006
- Karin Wolff, Responsible for Conference of Ministers of Education
- Peter Rauen, Chairman of the Sports Committee of the German Bundestag
- Thomas Röwekamp, Senator for the Interior and Sport, chairman of the Sports Ministers Conference of State 2005-2006
- Christina Weiss, former Minister of State and Federal Government Commissioner for Culture and Media

== Advisors ==
The World Cup committee was supported and advised by the Sports Committee of the German Bundestag. In this way, the Sports Committee had repeated exchanges with the OK, for example, in June 2003, about the opportunities and prospects of touristic marketing of the major football event. Members in the legislature until 2006 were, fifteen deputies of the SPD, CDU / CSU, Alliance '90 / The Greens and the FDP. Chairman of the Sports Committee was Peter Rauen of the CDU, who was also on the Board of OK.

== International Ambassador ==
One representative and ambassador of the World Cup was the coach of the Germany national football team Jürgen Klinsmann. In which the World and European champions (in 1990 and 1996) qualified him and his international career and knowledge of foreign languages. He played in Italy, France, England and lived in the United States. From those responsible for the national team was also Oliver Bierhoff. He held the position of national team manager and in 1996 was European champion. Bierhoff scored the golden goal that brought Germany the title and was one of the best strikers in the Italian Serie A in the nineties for Udinese Calcio and AC Milan. Another representative of the World Cup was the football functionary Karl-Heinz Rummenigge. FC Bayern Munich's CEO was European Champion in 1980 and was vice president of the Association of the European big clubs "G-14", and also within the UEFA, president of the European Club Forum. Rudi Völler was former captain of the Germany national team and the predecessor of Jürgen Klinsmann. The former international striker should also represent Germany in the world.

Chief organizer Franz Beckenbauer named more World Cup ambassadors, without exception of former professional football players, who officially accompanied their hometowns and World Cup host cities leading up to the World Cup:

- Andreas Köpke: goalkeeper and European champion (1996), goalkeeper coach of the Germany national football team; Köpke was ambassador of Nuremberg
- René Müller: Former GDR choice goalkeeper and former coach of the former second division FC Rot-Weiss Erfurt represented the city of Leipzig.
- Olaf Thon: Football World Champion in Rome in 1990, ended his active career in March 2003; was Ambassador of Gelsenkirchen, where he played for FC Schalke 04 for many years.
- Stefan Reuter: Football World Champion 1990, former captain of Borussia Dortmund; was Ambassador for Dortmund
- Sigi Held: National Football player and participant in the Wembley Final 1966, was later nominated Ambassador for Dortmund in April 2006
- Hansi Müller: The European Champion from 1980 took over the ambassadorial task of Guido Buchwald for Stuttgart. Buchwald was trainer from January 2004 to December 2006 in Japan's professional J1 League with Urawa Red Diamonds and therefore was limited as an available representative.
- Horst Eckel: World Champion in Bern in 1954, he was the youngest in the victorious team coached by Sepp Herberger; was ambassador for Kaiserslautern
- Uwe Seeler: honorary captain of the national team, the first top scorer in the Bundesliga in 1964; Uwe was ambassador for his home town of Hamburg
- Hans Siemensmeyer: Record goal scorer in the history of Hannover 96; was ambassador for his hometown of Hannover
- Wolfgang Overath: World champion of 1974, former outstanding midfielder of 1. FC Köln, from June 2004 to November 2011 was President of the Association; was ambassador for Cologne
- Michael Preetz: Centre forward for Hertha BSC, he represented the Berliners in the national team seven times, scoring three goals; was ambassador for Berlin
- Bernd Hölzenbein: World Champion of 1974 and striker for Eintracht Frankfurt; was ambassador for Frankfurt
- Jürgen Grabowski: World champion of 1974, led Eintracht Frankfurt in 1980 to a UEFA Cup victory; was ambassador of Frankfurt together with Hölzenbein
- Gerd Müller: The former center forward who was victorious three times in the final of the European Cup with FC Bayern Munich, represented the Bavarian capital of Munich. 1966/67 Müller won with Bayern the UEFA Cup Winners' Cup, in 1972 he won the European football championship, and two years later the World Cup final in Munich. His records include: 365 goals in the Bundesliga, 40 in a single season, and 68 goals in 62 internationals.
