= Bundesliga e.V. =

Union of the German professional football clubs, represents their interests

- Type: Eingetragener Verein (e. V.)
- Founded: 18 December 2000; 25 years ago
- Headquarters: Frankfurt, Germany
- Area served: Germany
- Owners: All football clubs participating in the Bundesliga and the 2. Bundesliga
- Subsidiaries: Deutsche Fußball Liga

Bundesliga e.V. (known as DFL Deutsche Fußball Liga e.V. until 2026 and often referred to as DFL) is the parent company of the Bundesliga GmbH. The Bundesliga e.V. is an association of the 36 German professional football clubs (or their companies) that partake in the Bundesliga and 2. Bundesliga, which represents their interests, especially against the German Football Association (Deutscher Fußball-Bund, DFB).

== Function ==
On 30 September 2000, at the extraordinary congress of the DFB-Bundestag in Mainz, the 36 professional clubs were released into the independence they had been demanding for many years. The then called Ligaverband was founded on 18 December 2000 as an Eingetragener Verein, with the DFB allowing the use of the two professional leagues in which the 36 professional clubs played in. In order to fulfill its duties, the Ligaverband established the Deutsche Fußball Liga (DFL) as a subsidiary, and transferred their operations to it. Several documents define the cooperation of the DFB and the DFL e.V.:

- Constitution of the DFB
- Constitution of the DFL
- Basic contract between the DFB and the DFL

Since 28 April 2001, the Ligaverband has been the representative association of clubs of the Bundesliga and 2. Bundesliga. Those clubs are members of the DFL and indirectly of the German Football Association through their respective state associations. The DFL is a member of the DFB, though. Since the start of the 2001–02 season, the Ligaverband has been responsible for operating the top two German professional leagues.

=== Basic contract ===
Since the DFB and the DFL organise the Bundesliga competitions jointly, a basic contract has been in place since the beginning of the 2004–05 season, which determines the rights and obligations of both parties. In particular, it grants the DFL the right to organize the DFB-owned club competitions of the Bundesliga and 2. Bundesliga. It also gives the DFL full marketing rights to the leagues. Not addressed in the basic contract are the competitions that can be autonomously controlled by the DFL (such as the DFL-Ligapokal and the former DFB-Hallenpokal).

In addition, the basic contract includes specific requirements regarding kick-off times and transmission of matches on free-to-air television. The basic contract was terminated for the first time by the DFB as well as the DFL in 2012.

== Bodies ==
The Bundesliga e.V. is managed by the board, which currently is composed of the president, two vice-presidents, and six other members, elected for three-year terms. The president of the DFL is a member of the Presidium and Vorstand of the German Football Association.

Werner Hackmann, from the Vorstand of Hamburger SV, was the first president of the DFL until his death in January 2007. Wolfgang Holzhäuser of Bayer Leverkusen held the office provisionally until Reinhard Rauball was elected as the next president in August 2007 at the general assembly. Christian Seifert became the president of the Vorstand from 2019 to 2021, succeeded by Donata Hopfen who served from 1 January until 7 December 2022.

Board of the Bundesliga e.V.
Name	Since	Function
Hans-Joachim Watzke	2022	President
Oliver Leki	2019	Vice-president
Steffen Schneekloth	2018	Vice-president
Jan-Christian Dreesen	2016	Member
Axel Hellmann	2022	Member
Oke Göttlich	2019	Member
Ansgar Schwenken	2019	Member
Holger Schwiewagner	2022	Member

All presidents of the Bundesliga e.V.
Period	Name
2001–2007	Werner Hackmann
2007	Wolfgang Holzhäuser (interim)
2007–2019	Reinhard Rauball
2019–2021	Christian Seifert
2022	Donata Hopfen
2022–present	Hans-Joachim Watzke

== See also ==
- German Football Association
- Deutsche Fußball Liga
