= Pleitgen =

Pleitgen is a surname. Notable people with the surname include:

- Frederik Pleitgen (born 1976), German television journalist
- Fritz Pleitgen (1938–2022), German television journalist
