= List of Regionalligen =

Regionalliga (plural Regionalligen, lit. 'Regional Leagues') is a designation in Germany for sports leagues, which are led by one or more regional federations. Regionalligen often fall below the Bundesliga and 2nd Bundesliga of a given sport. The exception is the men's football regional league, which has been led in Germany by the DFB since 1992.

== American football ==
=== Germany ===
In American football in Germany, the Regionalligen are the third division after the GFL and the GFL 2. In the 2015 season, the regional leagues north, east, west, center and south exist.

== Basketball ==
=== Germany ===
The Regionalligen in German Basketball are not subdivided only regionally, it exist also 1st and/or 2nd Regionalligen, between which promotion and relegation are possible.

== Ice hockey ==
=== Germany ===
The Regionalligen in ice hockey are, after the DEL, 2nd Bundesliga, and the Oberligen, the fourth division. In the 2004/05 season there were 4 Regionalligen: the Northern Regionalliga, the Eastern Regionalliga, the Regionalligen NRW (North Rhine/ Westphalia), and Hessen.

== Handball ==
=== Germany ===
The regional leagues are the third-highest play classes in the German handball. Since the season 2005/06 there are five regional leagues similarly to the number of regional federations: North, northeast, west, southwest and south. Up to the season 2004/05 existed a further regional league center, which was carried together by the five regional federations. After north and West German handball federation (by the way placed as only federations none of the associations playing there) had quit the appropriate contract, the relay was dissolved for the end of the play time and the associations after its association membership, playing there, on the remaining regional leagues was distributed. The five masters of the regional leagues ascend directly into the double-railed 2.Bundesliga (north and south). The underbody of the regional leagues are altogether 17 upper leagues, which are operated by the 22 regional organizations. This structure is similar both in the man and in the woman range.

== Football ==
=== Italy ===
Also in Italy there is a regional league (liga regionale) in each region.
