= Bundesliga (disambiguation) =

Bundesliga is the top division of men's association football in Germany.

Bundesliga may also refer to:

== Germany ==
- Other association football leagues:
  - Frauen-Bundesliga – Women's top division association football in Germany (1990–present)
  - Under 19 Bundesliga – Men's under 19 football (2003–present)
  - Under 17 Bundesliga – Men's under 17 football (2007–present)
  - companies:
    - Bundesliga e.V. – Association representing the interests of german football teams
    - Bundesliga-Gruppe – Organising body of the Men's Bundesliga
- Basketball Bundesliga (1966–present)
- Damen-Basketball-Bundesliga (founded 1947), women's basketball
- Bundesliga (baseball) (1984–present)
- Chess Bundesliga (1980–present)
- World League eSport Bundesliga (2005-2006), video games
- Men's Feldhockey Bundesliga
- Women's Feldhockey Bundesliga
- German Football League (1979–present), American football Bundesliga, renamed in 1999
- Go-Bundesliga, Go
- Handball-Bundesliga (1965–present)
- Handball-Bundesliga (women) (founded 1975), women's handball
- Ice hockey
  - Deutsche Eishockey Liga (1995–present)
  - Eishockey-Bundesliga (1958-1994)
  - German women's ice hockey Bundesliga (founded 1988), women's ice hockey
- Roller Hockey Bundesliga (founded 1967), men's roller hockey
- Rugby
  - Rugby-Bundesliga, rugby union (1971–present)
  - Women's Rugby Bundesliga (1987–present), women's rugby union
- Bundesliga (shooting) (1997–present)
- Bundesliga (table tennis) (1966–present)
- Snooker-Bundesliga (1998–present)
- Tennis Bundesliga (men) (1972–present)
- Volleyball
  - Deutsche Volleyball-Bundesliga
  - German Women's Volleyball League
    - German Women's 2 Volleyball Bundesliga
- Bundesliga (wrestling) (1964–present)

== Austria ==
- Austrian Football Bundesliga – men's association football
- ÖFB Frauen Bundesliga – women's association football
- Austrian Football League – men's American football
- Austrian Basketball Bundesliga – men's basketball
- 1. Rugby Bundesliga – men's rugby union
- Austria women's ice hockey Bundesliga – women's ice hockey
- Austrian Judo Bundesliga – judo

== See also ==
- 2nd Bundesliga (disambiguation)
