= Christian Seifert =

German entrepreneur and business manager

- Born: 8 May 1969 (age 57); Rastatt, West Germany
- Education: University of Duisburg-Essen
- Years active: 2005–present
- Known for: CEO of the Deutsche Fußball Liga

Christian Seifert (born 8 May 1969, in Rastatt) is a German entrepreneur and business manager who served as a CEO of the Deutsche Fußball Liga (DFL) from 2019 to 2021. He was a member of the League Board and Vice President of the German Football Association (German: Deuscher Fuball-Bund, DFB). He was also Vice Chairman of the Board of the Bundesliga-Stiftung (Bundesliga Foundation) and spokesperson for the Initiative Profisport Deutschland (IPD). Since 2022, Seifert has been developing a streaming platform for non-soccer sports with Dyn Media, which launched in the summer of 2023.

== Life ==
In his youth, Seifert played for FC Rastatt 04 in the association league. Seifert graduated from the technical high school in Rastatt in 1988. At the University of Duisburg-Essen, he studied Communication studies, Marketing and Sociology from 1991 to 1995. From 1995 to 1998, Seifert worked for MGM MediaGruppe München, where he rose to head of product management. From 1998 to 2000, Seifert was Director of Marketing in Central Europe for MTV Networks. From 2000 to 2005, Seifert was Member of the Board of KarstadtQuelle New Media AG; and CEO there from 2004.

== Football official ==
In February 2005, Seifert became a member of the management board of DFL Deutsche Fußball Liga GmbH and on 1 July 2005, Seifert became the CEO of DFL German Football League and vice-president of the DFB. In the management of DFL, Seifert was, among other things, responsible for the strategic direction of the DFL.

In 2005, Seifert was responsible for the first tender for media rights from a sports league in Europe. The European Commission had previously examined the assignment of rights for the Premier League, UEFA Champions League and Bundesliga and came to the conclusion that the rights should henceforth be assigned in a transparent and non-discriminatory manner as part of a tender. The EU wanted to promote competition and at least reduce the media buying power of Murdoch (England), Kirch (Germany) and Berlusconi (Italy).

For the first time, Seifert and his team developed a media tender in which six scenarios were offered in parallel. The rights went to newcomer Arena, who outperformed existing rights holder Premiere. Premiere had offered 15,000 euros for the pay rights for the scenario with the Sportschau and 150 million if the sports show were to be abolished. Premiere's share price collapsed by 40% after the auction results were announced. The DFL achieved an increase in the rights sum from 275 to 420 million euros.

He became a member of the League Board on 7 August 2007. In 2009, Seifert was appointed deputy chairman of the board of the Bundesliga Foundation, and a spokesman for the IPD Initiative Profisport Deutschland (Professional Sports Initiative Germany) in November 2009.

In 2020, as DFL Managing Director, Seifert played a key role in the fact that the Bundesliga was the first league in the world to resume play after a break of around two months due to the COVID-19 pandemic – on 16 May 2020 in stadiums without an audience. After Bundesliga and 2. Bundesliga games were suspended on 13 March 2020 due to COVID-19, the DFL developed a “six-point plan to save the Bundesliga” under Seifert's leadership and approved it with those responsible in politics and representatives of the professional clubs and medical experts. Many other organizers of major sporting events, including UEFA, the Olympic Games, the US Open, NFL and Formula 1, followed suit and took their lead from the DFL. Against the background of the COVID-19 crisis and its effects on society and sport, in 2020 Seifert initiated the formation of a task force for the future of professional football. The nine-page results report presented on 3 February 2021 contains 17 recommendations for action for the DFL and the 36 clubs in the Bundesliga and 2. Bundesliga. Seifert also served as the chairman of the World Leagues Forum.

On 1 January 2022, Donata Hopfen succeeded Seifert as CEO of the DFL.

== Founding of the sports channel Dyn ==
In early 2022, Seifert founded the Startup company Reedstreet Ventures. The first founding of this company was the start-up Dyn Media (initially S Nation Media), in which the Axel Springer Group held a majority stake. Dyn Media is developing a channel for sports beyond football that is scheduled to launch on 23 August 2023. The company already has media rights to the Handball Bundesliga (men and women), the Table Tennis Bundesliga TTBL, the Volleyball Bundesliga VBL (men and women), the Basketball Bundesliga and Basketball Champions League, and the Field Hockey Bundesliga for men and women acquired for several seasons starting in 2023. In addition, the company wants to offer "other relevant competitions of the sports".

In December 2022 it became known that Seifert and his investment company Reedstreet Ventures had invested in the Potsdam startup Kurabu, a digital platform for clubs. Members, teams, coaches and parents can communicate with each other via an app and officials, employees and administrators can manage the club.

== Volunteering ==
Christian Seifert has been chairman of the supervisory board of the German Sports Aid Foundation since September 2021.

== Awards ==
The DFL made Seifert an honorary member on 17 August 2022. The laudatory speech was held by the historian and publicist Michael Wolffsohn.

The organizers of the German Sports Press Ball - the Association of German Sports Journalists and the Frankfurt Sports Press Association in cooperation with the communications agency metropress - awarded Seifert the Pegasos Prize in 2020 in the special category "Special Services to German Sports".

== Literature ==
- Christian Seifert, in: International sports archive 28/2012 from 10 July 2012, in the Munzinger-Archiv (Article beginning freely available)
