= Wilfried Straub =

German football official

- Born: 29 March 1939; Egelsbach Bayerseich
- Died: 2 May 2016 (aged 77)
- Title: Vice president of the German Football Association
- Term: 2001–2005

Wilfried Straub (26 March 1939 – 2 May 2016) was a German football official. He was vice president of the German Football Association (German: Deutscher Fuball-Bund, DFB) and until May 2005 Chief Executive Officer of the Deutsche Fußball Liga (DFL).

== Career ==
Straub started his career in 1968 as Head of Department at the German Football Association. A year later he became DFB League secretary and held this position for 21 years, until 1991. He then worked for ten years as DFB director for League Marketing Economy/Finance.

2001 Straub became vice president of the DFB. He coordinated the cooperation between the DFB and the DFL. He was also responsible for the DFB Club Pokal. Straub also represented the DFB internationally. Together with Wolfgang Holzhäuser, he introduced the licensing system for the Bundesliga. Other areas of his responsibilities included the Training centers of the Bundesliga and the 2. Bundesliga, contract management and international club competitions.

Straub served on the board of the World Cup Organizing Committee (German: Organisationskomittee, OK) of the 2006 FIFA World Cup. He was responsible for the coordination between the OK and the DFL.

Straub received an award for lifetime achievement at the "ISPO Sports Sponsoring Congress" award ceremony in 2005. With the end of the Bundesliga season 2004/05, Straub withdrew from the operative business and became consultant for the DFL. Wilfried Straub was a member of the Board of Trustees of the Bundesliga Foundation and an honorary member of the German Football Association.

In his last year as CEO of DFL, Straub participated in the negotiations with ProSiebenSat.1 Media for the allocation of television rights. He voiced a definite No to a Club World Cup and advocated another term for Werner Hackmann as league chief.

In 2006, he received the UEFA President's Award.
