= World Leagues Association =

Organization representing professional association football leagues

The World Leagues Forum (WLF) is an organization representing professional association football leagues that formed in 2016. It currently includes 47 member leagues from five of FIFA's six continental confederations.

== History ==
Executives and representatives from 24 professional football leagues convened the Global Leagues Forum in April 2015 to discuss current issues with the football system and business as a whole. The World Leagues Forum was formed in early 2016 in preparation for the 2016 FIFA Extraordinary Congress, in which a new FIFA president would be elected. It convened its first meeting on 25 February 2016, in Zürich before the FIFA Congress. The WLF initially comprised 24 member football leagues, but has since expanded to 47 leagues and holds annual meetings that are hosted by members.

In 2018, the group voiced its opposition to FIFA president Gianni Infantino's plan to expand the FIFA Club World Cup and implement a global club league.

The WLF established a women's division in 2023, chaired by National Women's Soccer League commissioner Jessica Berman.

== Members ==
As of 2024, the WLF has 47 member leagues and associations from five continental confederations.

Asian Football Confederation (AFC)

- A-League Men (Australia)
- Indian Super League (India)
- J.League (Japan)
- Malaysia Super League (Malaysia)
- Qatar Stars League (Qatar)
- Saudi Professional League (Saudi Arabia)
- UAE Pro League Committee (United Arab Emirates)
- Uzbekistan Professional Football League Organization (Uzbekistan)

Confederation of African Football (CAF)

- Botswana Premier League (Botswana)
- Egyptian Premier League (Egypt)
- Malagasy Pro League (Madagascar)
- Ligue Nationale de Football Professionnel (Morocco)
- Nigeria Professional Football League (Nigeria)
- Premier Soccer League (South Africa)
- Zimbabwe Premier Soccer League (Zimbabwe)

Confederation of North, Central American and Caribbean Association Football (CONCACAF)

- Canadian Premier League (Canada)
- Liga de Fútbol de Primera División (Costa Rica)
- Liga Dominicana de Fútbol (Dominican Republic)
- Liga Nacional de Fútbol Profesional de Honduras (Honduras)
- Liga MX (Mexico)
- Liga Primera (Nicaragua)
- Liga Panameña de Fútbol (Panama)
- Major League Soccer (United States)

South American Football Confederation (CONMEBOL)

- Ecuadorian Serie A (Ecuador)

Union of European Football Associations (UEFA)

- Belgian Pro League (Belgium)
- Ligová fotbalová asociace (The Czech Republic)
- Divisionsforeningen (Denmark)
- Premier League (England)
- Ligue de Football Professionnel (France)
- Deutsche Fußball Liga/Bundesliga (Germany)
- Super League Greece (Greece)
- Israeli Professional Football Leagues (Israel)
- Serie A (Italy)
- Latvian Higher League (Latvia)
- Eredivisie (The Netherlands)
- Ekstraklasa (Poland)
- Liga Portuguesa de Futebol Profissional (Portugal)
- Liga Profesionistă de Fotbal (Romania)
- Scottish Professional Football League (Scotland)
- Super Liga Srbije (Serbia)
- La Liga (Spain)
- Föreningen Svensk Elitfotboll (Sweden)
- Swiss Football League (Switzerland)
- Turkish Union of Clubs (Turkey)
- Ukrainian Premier League (Ukraine)

== Governance ==
The World Leagues Forum is governed by a Steering Committee composed of representatives and executives from top member leagues. Its current chairman is Enrique Bonilla of Liga MX. Its two vice chairmen are Don Garber of Major League Soccer and Christian Seifert, the CEO of the Deutsche Fußball Liga.

Its general secretary is Jerome Perlemuter, former General Counsel of the French Football League, who was appointed in April 2017.

== See also ==
- European Leagues
