= Federal league (disambiguation) =

Federal league may refer to:

- Federal League, a short-lived Baseball league
- Federal League (OHSAA), a high school athletic conference in Ohio
- Liga Federal, a small confederal state in what is now Argentina and Uruguay
- Federal League, a fictitious ice hockey league from the film Slap Shot
- Federal Prospects Hockey League, a low level hockey league based in the eastern United States
- Federal Rugby League, a third-level Rugby league in Russia.

== See also ==
- Bundesliga (disambiguation), literally "Federal league", several sports leagues in German-speaking countries
