= Ernie Walker (football) =

Scottish football administrator

Ernie Walker CBE
- Born: Ernest John Munro Walker; 7 July 1928; Glasgow, Scotland
- Died: 14 May 2011 (aged 82)
- Known for: Association football administrator

Ernest John Munro Walker CBE (7 July 1928 – 14 May 2011), known as Ernie Walker, was a Scottish association football administrator who served as the Secretary of the Scottish Football Association from 1977 to 1990. He was also Chairman of UEFA's Stadia Committee for more than a decade.

Walker was appointed Officer of the Order of the British Empire (OBE) in the 1989 New Year Honours and upgraded to Commander (CBE) in the 1995 Birthday Honours. In 2004, he received the UEFA President's Award.
