= DFB-Hallenpokal =

Football tournament

The DFB-Hallenpokal, also known as Hallen-Masters (Indoor Championship), was a five-a-side indoor football competition which was held from 1988 to 2001 under the direction of the German Football Association (German: Deutscher Fußball-Bund, DFB). In 1987 the final tournament was only unofficially organized. In 2001 the German Football Association and Deutsche Fußball Liga were the organizers of the DFB-Hallenpokal. It was the final tournament of several qualifying tournaments where, in addition to clubs from the Bundesliga and 2. Bundesliga, amateur teams and foreign clubs also participated. Record champion was Borussia Dortmund, who was also the only club that won the DFB Hallenpokal multiple times.

The DFB-Hallenpokal was created in order to fill the winter break. Participation, especially from the top teams was relatively restrained, mainly because of the increased risk of injury. The number of active viewers also decreased over the years. Additionally, in the late 1900s, the deadlines for the clubs created conflict. Once the winter break had been shortened, the DFB announced that the competition in 2001 would be its last.

== Winner ==
No.	Club	Winner	Year	Runner-up	Year	Third Place	Year	Fourth Place	Year
1	Borussia Dortmund	4	1990, 1991, 1992, 1999	-	-	1	1993	1	1996
2	Werder Bremen	1	1989	2	1991, 2001	3	1987, 1990, 1992	2	1998
3	Hamburger SV	1	1987	1	1996	2	1993, 1994	-	-
4	Bayer 04 Leverkusen	1	1994	1	1995	1	2000	-	-
5	1. FC Köln	1	1993	1	1994	-	-	1	1990
6	Bayer 05 Uerdingen	1	1988	1	1990	-	-	-	-
7	Karlsruher SC	1	1995	-	-	1	1996	-	-
8	TSV 1860 München	1	1996	-	-	-	-	1	1997
8	SpVgg Greuther Fürth	1	2000	-	-	-	-	1	2001
10	1. FC Kaiserslautern	1	1997	-	-	-	-	-	-
10	Hansa Rostock	1	1998	-	-	-	-	-	-
10	SpVgg Unterhaching	1	2001	-	-	-	-	-	-
13	VfB Stuttgart	-	-	3	1987, 1989, 1993	1	1991	-	-
14	Eintracht Frankfurt	-	-	1	1988	2	1989, 1999	-	-
15	FC Bayern München	-	-	1	1997	1	1992	2	1989, 2000
16	FC Schalke 04	-	-	1	1998	1	1995	1	1987
17	VfL Bochum	-	-	1	1992	1	1994	-	-
18	Borussia Mönchengladbach	-	-	1	2000	-	-	2	1991, 1995
19	VfL Wolfsburg	-	-	1	1999	-	-	-	-
20	Fortuna Düsseldorf	-	-	-	-	3	1988, 1997, 1998	-	-
21	Energie Cottbus	-	-	-	-	1	2001	-	-
22	VfL Osnabrück	-	-	-	-	-	-	1	1988
22	Rot-Weiß Oberhausen	-	-	-	-	-	-	1	1999
