= Horst R. Schmidt =

German footballer

Horst Rudolf Schmidt
- Born: 19 November 1941; Nuremberg, Germany
- Title: Vice President of the Organizing Committee for the 2006 FIFA World Cup
- Term: 2001–2006

Horst Rudolf Schmidt (born 19 November 1941) is a German football official.

== Life ==
At the 1972 Summer Olympics and at the 1974 FIFA World Cup, Schmidt was a member of the organizing committee. He was also involved with FIFA and UEFA in the organization of World and European Championships. From 1976 to 1992 he was head of department and director in the headquarters of German Football Association (German: Deutscher Fußball-Bund, DFB). He then worked as secretary general of DFB until 2007.

From January 2001 to the summer of 2006, Schmidt was the vice president of the Organizing Committee for the 2006 FIFA World Cup in Germany.

From 2007 to 2013, he held the office of DFB treasurer. He was adviser to the organizing committee of the 2010 FIFA World Cup in South Africa.

In March 2016, the FIFA Ethics Committee opened formal proceedings against Schmidt regarding the awarding of the 2006 FIFA World Cup. In this context, the Switzerland's attorney general's office opened criminal proceedings against Schmidt for alleged money laundering and breach of trust, since dubious international money transfers were thought to have been made through Swiss accounts.

Schmidt is married and has been living in Aschaffenburg for many years.

== Awards ==
Schmidt received the Bavarian Order of Merit in July 2005. In 2002, he was awarded the Order of Merit of the Federal Republic of Germany, and in 2013 the 1st class of the Order of Merit. Schmidt is an honorary member of the German Football Association.
