= DFL Foundation =

Charitable non-profit organisation associated with the German soccer leagues

Bundesliga Foundation
- Native name: Bundesliga Stiftung
- Formerly: Bundesliga Foundation (German: Bundesliga-Stiftung)
- Type: Rechtsfähige Stiftung (nonprofit foundation)
- Founded: 2008; 18 years ago
- Headquarters: Frankfurt, Germany
- Area served: Germany
- Key people: Franziska Fey (Chairwoman of the Vorstand)
- Parent: Die Liga – Fußballverband; Deutsche Fußball Liga
- Website: Official website

The Bundesliga Foundation is a charitable foundation dedicated to social projects. It was established in November 2008 by DFL Deutsche Fußball Liga GmbH and DFL e. V.

The foundation is based in Frankfurt am Main. Franziska Fey is the current chairwoman of the board.

== Purpose of the foundation ==
As a professional football foundation, the Bundesliga Foundation works together with the Bundesliga and Bundesliga 2 clubs to help children and young people realise their potential by promoting and supporting social projects. In addition to the commitment of the 36 professional clubs, the Bundesliga Foundation's statutes state that it ‘promotes sport, education and training as well as international understanding’. It is involved in three action areas: Social cohesion, growing up healthy and active and elite sport.

The foundation grants subsidies on application, but also carries out its own projects and enters into partnerships.

== Campaigns ==
=== "Athletes for Athletes" ===
In cooperation with the Bundesliga (former DFL), the most publicly successful campaign Sportler für Sportler (Athletes for Athletes) was developed in the spring of 2009. Through until 2010, TV commercials were broadcast in which well-known players and coaches from the Bundesliga and Olympic athletes from various sports, were shown asking for mutual support and calling on donations to the German Sports Aid.

=== "Strich durch Vorurteile" campaign ===
In March 2018, the Bundesliga Foundation joined forces with all 36 clubs in the first and second Bundesliga to take a stand against discrimination with the “Strich durch Vorurteile” campaign. In various commercials, Bundesliga players Manuel Neuer, Naldo and Kevin-Prince Boateng and the Bundesliga Foundation's trustees, Marcel Reif and Wolfgang Niedecken, called for a decisive stand against exclusion. On the 27th matchday of the first and second Bundesliga in the 2017/2018 season, a variety of campaigns were held in the stadiums of the 36 professional clubs to set an example for cohesion in society. The focus was on 36 projects from around the professional clubs that promote fair coexistence. The projects were presented on the platform clubheim.dfl-stiftung.de with the aim of using the wide reach of professional soccer to create a platform for smaller projects. The philosophy behind this is to ensure that the Bundesliga Foundation and clubs continue to support and promote projects beyond the campaign days.

Since 2018, the Bundesliga Foundation has been increasingly involved in the area of social cohesion. In cooperation with Phineo, the Wirkometer was created, which clubs and non-profits can use to check how successfully they are achieving their goals.

=== “International Weeks Against Racism” ===
The Bundesliga Foundation supports the International Weeks Against Racism together with the Bundesliga and the clubs of the Bundesliga and Bundesliga 2. The campaign takes place annually in March and is coordinated in Germany by the Foundation Against Racism. Since 2023, action matchdays and communication campaigns have been organised around selected Bundesliga and Bundesliga 2 fixtures to take a stand against racism, hate and discrimination, while promoting diversity, respect and social cohesion.

Under the slogans “STOP RACISM” (2023) and “TOGETHER! Stop Hate. Be a Team.” (since 2024), the campaign messages have been displayed on official match balls, captain’s armbands, player walkout shirts, LED advertising boards and other stadium media. In addition, the messages have been communicated through digital channels, television broadcasts, as well as accompanying educational and dialogue-based initiatives. As part of the TOGETHER! Action Weeks, clubs and partner organisations engage in a wide range of activities aimed at fostering a respectful and discrimination-free society.

== Capital resources and use ==
The Bundesliga Foundation is supported by the Bundesliga e. V. and the Deutscher Fußball-Bund e. V. (German Football Association). The two associations were responsible for the largest donations to the Bundesliga Foundation in 2022/23. Since its establishment in November 2008, the Bundesliga Foundation hasused €41.8 million to support young people.

== Projects ==
The Bundesliga Foundation initiates their own programmes and promotes third-party projects. They make a distinction here between their flagship projects and funding projects.

=== Flagship projects ===
==== Bundesliga moves ====
Through its "Bundesliga moves" project, the Bundesliga Foundation along with 24 Bundesliga and Bundesliga 2 clubs seek to connect stakeholders in social spaces such as disadvantaged urban areas and so lay the groundwork to help children grow up leading an active lifestyle.

==== Football meets culture ====
A combination of football, competence training and regular cultural activities: the inclusive education programme develops children’s language and social skills, hones their learning capacity and boosts their confidence.

==== Classroom Stadium ====
With a combination of football and the special "Classroom Stadium", they raise awareness among children and young people for social issues and strengthen their democratic skills and awareness through everyday, youth-friendly formats.

==== Youth elite funding ====
Through its youth elite funding, German professional football provides targeted support for the most promising Olympic, Paralympic and Deaflympic athletes via German Sports Aid.

==== step kickt! ====
Together with the fit4future foundation and in close collaboration with various professional clubs, the Bundesliga Foundation launched the ‘step kickt!’ project designed to inspire school pupils to engage in more physical exercise and eat more healthily.

=== Funding projects ===
==== Active nurseries ====
In cooperation with the German Sports Youth, a quality catalogue "Kitas in Bewegung" ("active nurseries") is being developed to strengthen cross sport movement in the elementary sector.

==== Football friend cup ====
Inclusive football tournament series for people with and without disabilities in cooperation with Bundesliga and Bundesliga 2 clubs.

==== Tandem Young Coach training ====
Inclusive qualification programme that enables teenagers and young adults with and without disabilities to take on responsibility as coaches for people with disabilities in football.

==== My Town. My Sport. My Future. ====
Promotion of programmes for the development of exercise and nutrition programmes in the SOS Kinderdorf.

==== Midnight Sports ====
Low-threshold football programme in a socially deprived area at conflict-prone evening/night times.

==== Safe-Hub Berlin ====
The Safe-Hub Berlin is the first youth education centre to be established in Germany based on the model of South African safe hubs (= safe, personal development education centres).

==== MANUS moves ====
The weekly exercise programme "MANUS moves" offers children and young people a wide range of opportunities to exercise, improve their motor skills and work on their social skills.

== Bodies of the foundation ==
=== Executive board ===
- Franziska Fey (Chairwoman)
- Jörg Degenhart (Deputy Chairman)

=== Foundation board ===
- Dr. Marc Lenz (Chairman of the Foundation Board)
- Ansgar Schwenken (Deputy Chairman of Foundation Board)
- Axel Hellmann (Member of the Foundation Board)
- Nicole Kumpis (Member of the Foundation Board)
- Bernd Neuendorf (Member of the Foundation Board)

=== Trustees ===
- Marcel Reif (Chairman of the Board of Trustees)
- Julia Jäkel (Deputy Chairwoman of the Board of Trustees)
- Matondo Castlo
- Dunja Hayali
- Britta Heidemann
- Dr. Eckart von Hirschhausen
- Maria Höfl-Riesch
- Niko Kappel
- Sebastian Kehl
- Johannes B. Kerner
- Peter Maffay
- Wolfgang Niedecken
- Matthias Steiner
- Christian Wulff
- Dr h. c. Fritz Pleitgen (Honorary Member of the Board of Trustees)

=== Ambassadors ===
- Manuel Neuer
- Markus Rehm
