= Hans Filbinger Foundation =

German foundation

The Hans Filbinger Foundation (German: Hans Filbinger-Stiftung zur Förderung christlichen, vaterländischen und humanistischen Gedankengutes in Wissenschaft, Wirtschaft, Kunst und Politik) is a German Christian Democratic foundation that was founded in 1993 by around 100 members of Studienzentrum Weikersheim, including Gerhard Mayer-Vorfelder (at the time Baden-Württemberg's Minister of Finance) and leading journalist Gerhard Löwenthal. It is named after CDU politician Hans Filbinger, the long-time Minister President of Baden-Württemberg. Since 2005, the foundation awards the Hans Filbinger Prize (German: Hans Filbinger–Förderpreis).
