= Arena (TV platform) =

German media company

Arena's logo

Arena, legally Arena Sport Rechte und Marketing GmbH was a German media company. Its main operation was a pay television channel called Arena. It was a subsidiary of the cable operator Unitymedia. It ceased operations on 30 September 2010.

Arena was introduced in late 2005, when it was led by Parm Sadhu, and won the broadcasting rights to the Bundesliga for the years 2006 to 2009 in a DFL auction. In 2010 Unitymedia sublicensed the rights to Premiere.

== Economic development ==
To pay the €220 million cost of the broadcast rights for the first and second Bundesliga and other associated costs (more sports rights, technology, personnel, advertising), Arena needed 2.5 million subscribers. By mid 2007 they only had 1.1 million customers, which led to huge losses.

In the nine months from July 2006 to March 2007 the station lost €189 million. Expenditures totaled €316 million, revenues totaled only €127 million. Losses from the first year of Bundesliga coverage came to around €250 million.

As a result, the Bundesliga rights were sublicensed to Premiere in mid 2007. Arena received a total of €200 million (€100 million per season) and an equity stake of 17% in Premiere AG valued at €300 million. Arena gave the rights to Premiere as a sub-license, and remained contractor of Bundesliga until 2009.

== Bundesliga ==
The pay TV channel Arena Bundesliga broadcast all 612 games of the first and second Bundesliga in the 2006/2007 season live. The contract with DFL ran for the three years to July 2009. The rights were sublicensed at the beginning of the 2007/2008 season to Premiere, a competitor.

Arena broadcast via satellite and cable. Cable customers were changed €15 a month and satellite customers were changed €20 a month. Minimum terms were between 12 and 24 months, which meant that payments had to be made even when no Bundesliga games were broadcast. The channel broadcast ads before and after matches, and at half time.

Despite relatively cheap subscriptions, Arena wasn't able to attract sufficient subscribers. At the time of purchasing the Bundesliga rights in December 2005, Arena aimed to have six million subscribers, but by mid 2007 had only 1.1 million.

Besides sublicensing Bundesliga rights to Premiere, Arena also sublicensed all other rights (for example to the Spanish Primera Division). The station was reduced in scope and existed from 2007 as a satellite platform called "arenaSAT" until 30 September 2010.

Arena also broadcast live matches of the Primera División in Spain, Premier League in England and the Serie A in Italy. It also broadcast HBO US Boxing Nights, skeleton, sailing, volleyball, Copa del Rey, and the Football League Cup.
