= UEFA President's Award =

Sportsmanship award

- Description: Recognition of outstanding achievements and professional excellence in football
- Presented by: UEFA President
- Website: www.uefa.com

The UEFA President's Award recognises outstanding achievements, professional excellence and exemplary personal qualities. The accolade, first introduced by UEFA in 1998, is usually awarded annually to a football personality who is deemed to have advanced the game's development and success.

The 2021 UEFA President's Award went to Denmark's national football team captain and their medical and coaching staff for their heroic response when Danish midfielder Christian Eriksen suffered a cardiac arrest on the field during a Euro 2020 match against Finland. During the game, Eriksen collapsed unexpectedly, and his teammates quickly formed a protective circle around him to shield him from the cameras, providing privacy while the medical team performed life-saving CPR. Denmark’s captain, Simon Kjær, played a crucial role in comforting Eriksen’s partner and directing the team to support each other. The medical team’s swift response saved Eriksen’s life, and their professionalism and composure were widely praised.

Recently, Eric Cantona has become infamous for his acceptance speech for the 2019 UEFA Presidents Award. Dressed in a flat cap, he began by quoting William Shakespeare's King Lear – "As flies to wanton boys we are for the gods" – before referencing science, war and crime.

== Winners ==
Year	Winner	Ref.
1998	(France) Jacques Delors	
1999	Not Awarded	
2000	(France) Guy Roux	
2001	(Spain) Juan Santisteban	
2002	(England) Bobby Robson	
2003	(Italy) Paolo Maldini	
2004	(Scotland) Ernie Walker	
2005	(Netherlands) Frank Rijkaard	
2006	(Germany) Wilfried Straub	
2007	(Argentina) Alfredo Di Stéfano	
2008	(England) Bobby Charlton	
2009	(Portugal) Eusébio	
2010	(France) Raymond Kopa	
2011	(Italy) Gianni Rivera	
2012	(Germany) Franz Beckenbauer	
2013	(Netherlands) Johan Cruyff	
2014	(Czech Republic) Josef Masopust	
2015	Not Awarded	
2016	Not Awarded	
2017	(Italy) Francesco Totti	
2018	(England) David Beckham	
2019	(France) Eric Cantona	
2020	(Ivory Coast) Didier Drogba	
2021	(Denmark) Mogens Kreutzfeldt (Denmark) Frederik Flensted (Denmark) Anders Boesen (Denmark) Peder Ersgaard (Denmark) Jens Kleinefeld (Bulgaria) Valentin Velikov (Denmark) Morten Skjoldager (Denmark) Morten Boesen (Denmark) Simon Kjær	
2022	(Italy) Arrigo Sacchi	
2023	(Germany) Miroslav Klose	
2024	(Italy) Gianluigi Buffon	
2025	(Sweden) Zlatan Ibrahimović	
2026	(France) Thierry Henry	
