= 2nd Bundesliga =

2nd Bundesliga may refer to:

- 2. Bundesliga, the second division in German men's football (association football)
  - 2. Frauen-Bundesliga, the second division in German women's football
- 2. Basketball Bundesliga, the second division in German men's basketball
- 2. Handball-Bundesliga, the second division in German men's handball
- 2nd Bundesliga (ice hockey), formerly the second division in German men's ice hockey
- 2. Rugby-Bundesliga, the second division in German Rugby union competitions for men and women
- Zweite Judo-Bundesliga, the second division in Austrian men's judo

== See also ==
- Bundesliga (disambiguation), the name for the premier league of any sport in Germany or Austria
- German Football League 2, the second division of American football in Germany
- Regionalliga, a designation in Germany for sports leagues, which are led by one or more regional federations
