= Karin Wolff =

German politician; former deputy minister president of Hesse

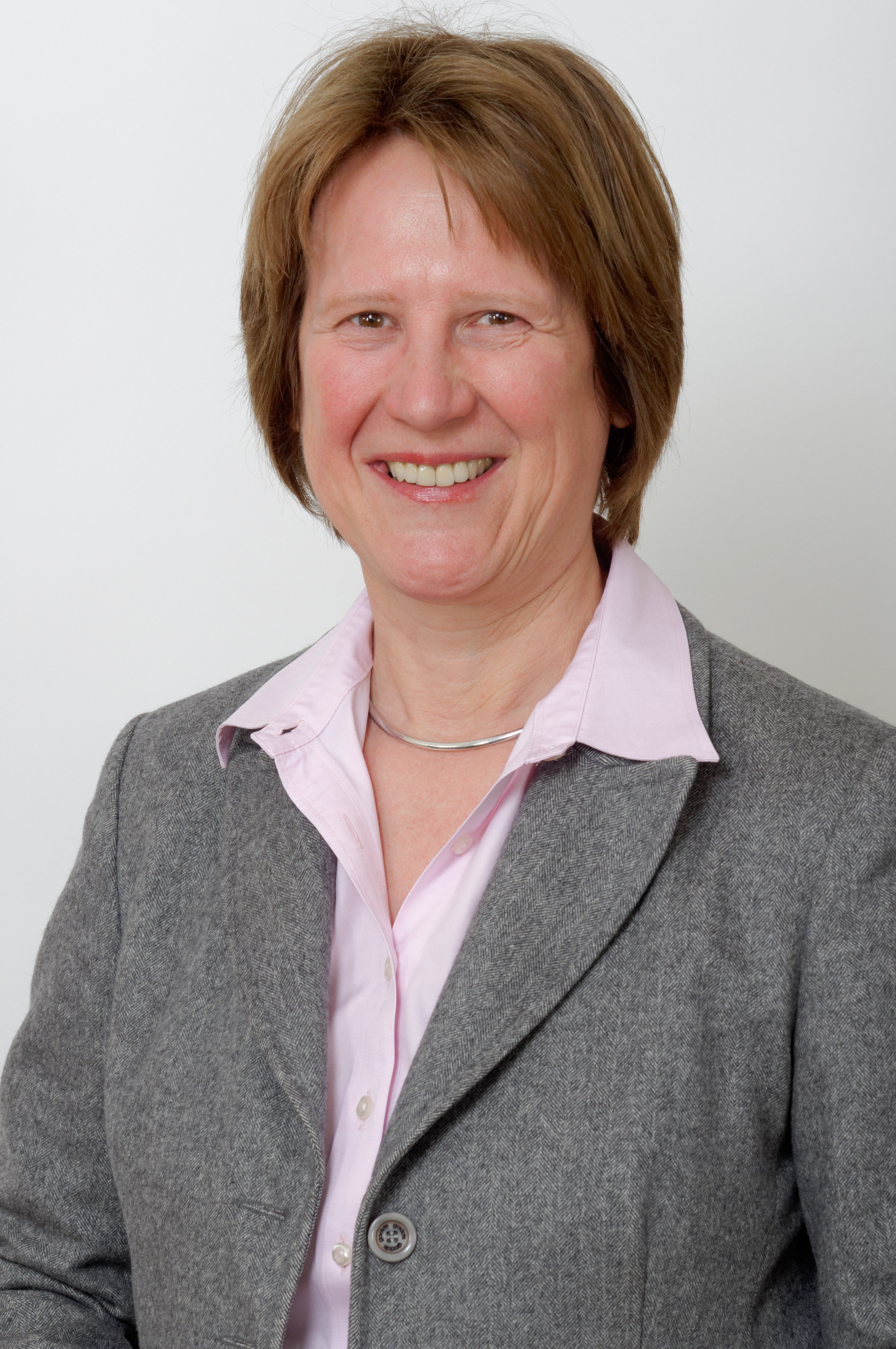
- Wolff in 2013

Deputy Minister-President of Hesse
- In office April 2003 – 4 April 2008
- Preceded by: Ruth Wagner
- Succeeded by: Volker Bouffier

Hessian Minister of Education
- In office 7 April 1999 – 4 April 2008

Member of the Landtag of Hesse for Darmstadt-Stadt II
- In office 5 April 1995 – 19 November 2008

Personal details
- Born: 23 February 1959 (age 67) Darmstadt, West Germany
- Party: CDU
- Education: Johannes-Gutenberg-Universität Mainz, Philipps-Universität Marburg
- Occupation: teacher

Karin Wolff (born 23 February 1959 in Darmstadt) is a German politician and former deputy minister president of Hesse.

Wolff studied history, evangelical theology and philosophy at Johannes-Gutenberg-Universität Mainz and Philipps-Universität Marburg. She finished university and worked as a teacher in Darmstadt.

In 1976 Wolff became a member of the conservative Christian Democratic Union. In 1995 she became a member of parliament in Hesse and became minister in Hesse on 7 April 1999.

Wolff has written two books on children and education. She lives in Darmstadt in an openly lesbian relationship.

== Works by Wolff ==
- Karin Wolff (ed.): Ohne Bildung keine Zukunft: sind unsere Bildungskonzepte noch zeitgemäß? Frankfurt am Main, 2001, ISBN 3-89843-048-0
- Karin Wolff: Klasse Schule - starke Kinder. Ideen, Projekte und Perspektiven für Hessen. Wiesbaden, 2007, ISBN 978-3-89869-197-0

== Criticism ==
She is a creationist. In 2006 she made the following remark in an article in the Frankfurter Allgemeine Zeitung:

"Ich halte es für sinnvoll, fächerübergreifende und -verbindende Fragestellungen aufzuwerfen, dass man nicht einfach Schüler in Biologie mit der Evolutionslehre konfrontiert und Schüler im Religionsunterricht mit der Schöpfungslehre der Bibel. Sondern dass man gelegentlich auch schaut, ob es Gegensätze oder Konvergenzen gibt."

("I think it makes sense to bring up multidisciplinary and interdisciplinary problems for discussion, that you do not just confront students with the theory of evolution in biology, and with the theology of creation in religious education. But that you also occasionally look whether there are differences or convergences.")
