= Hans-Joachim Watzke =

German businessman and football official (born 1959)

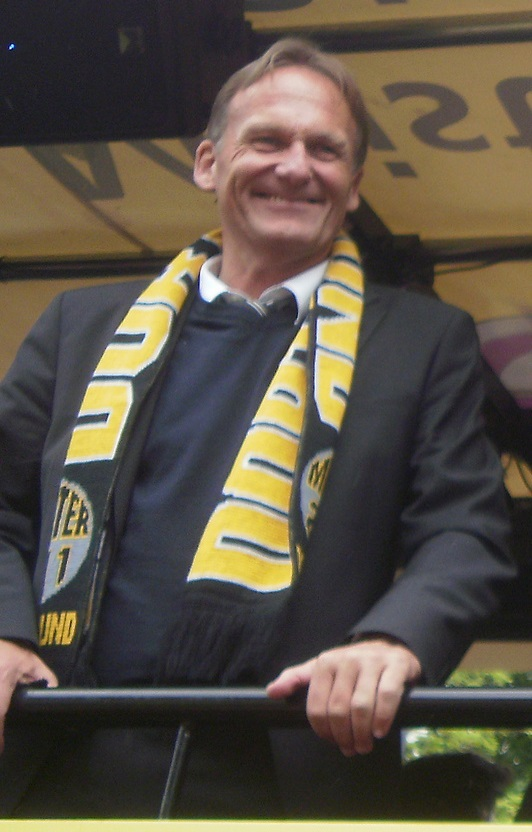
Hans-Joachim Watzke in 2011

Hans-Joachim "Aki" Watzke (born 21 June 1959, Marsberg, North Rhine-Westphalia) is a German businessman and football official. He was the CEO of Borussia Dortmund from 2005 until 2025 and has been the club's elected president since November 2025. Watzke has served as Chairman of the Supervisory Board of the Bundesliga-Gruppe since 11 February 2022.

== Background ==
Hans-Joachim Watzke watched his first games at the Rote Erde as a child, and has been a member of Borussia Dortmund since 1996.

== Business career ==
He earned a Master of Business Administration degree from Paderborn University.

He founded and expanded Watex, a company specializing in safety clothing, which achieved sales of €15–20 million and employed 45 people.

=== Work at Borussia Dortmund ===
He became treasurer of Borussia Dortmund in 2001.

In 2005, at the height of the club's financial crisis, he was appointed chief executive officer. Alongside chairman Reinhard Rauball and CFO Thomas Treß, Watzke is credited with having saved the club from bankruptcy. He restructured and streamlined the club, implemented strict cost-cutting measures, and followed a clear financial plan. A 20% pay cut was applied to all players. In 2006, to reduce debt, the Westfalenstadion was renamed "Signal Iduna Park" after a local insurance company (the naming rights agreement runs until 2031).

In 2024, it was announced that he would step down as CEO the following year. His replacement was named as Lars Ricken.

== Administrative career ==
On 14 December 2021, Watzke was elected first vice-president of the German Football Association (DFB). In February 2022, he was appointed chairman of the Supervisory Board of the Die Liga – Fußballverband. On 5 April 2023, he became a UEFA Executive Committee member.

== Political affiliations ==
Watzke is a member of the Christian Democratic Union and considered as a trusted friend of chancellor Friedrich Merz.
