= Theo Zwanziger =

German lawyer and sports official (born 1945)

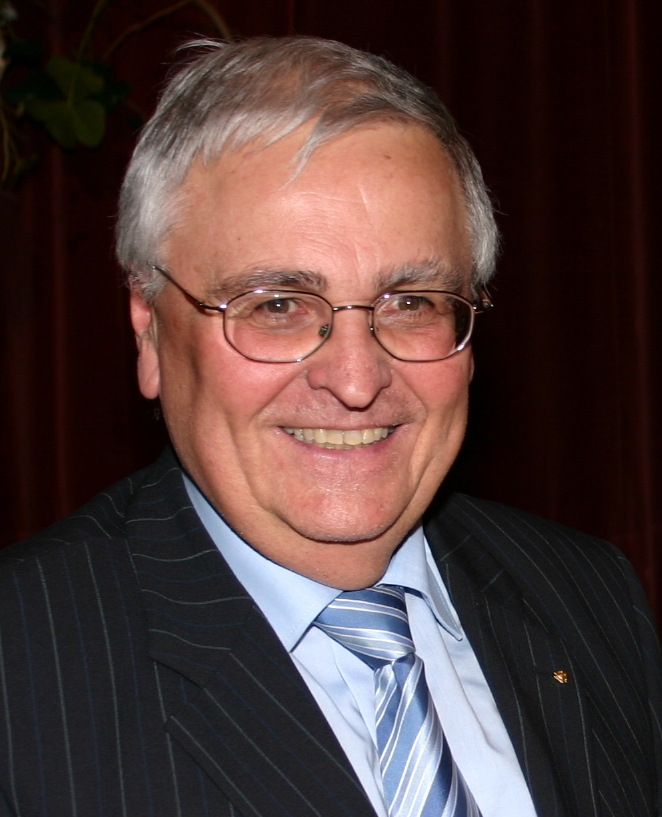
- Zwanziger in 2006

10th President of the DFB
- In office 8 September 2006 – 2 March 2012
- Preceded by: Gerhard Mayer-Vorfelder
- Succeeded by: Wolfgang Niersbach

Executive President of the DFB
- In office 23 October 2004 – 8 September 2006 Serving with president Gerhard Mayer-Vorfelder

District president of Koblenz
- In office 1987 – 1991

Member of the Landtag of Rhineland-Palatinate from district 1
- In office 1 June 1985 – 9 January 1987

Personal details
- Born: 6 June 1945 (age 81) Altendiez, Germany
- Party: CDU
- Children: 2
- Occupation: Judge; lawyer
- Awards: Federal Cross of Merit

Theo Zwanziger (born 6 June 1945) is a German lawyer and sports official. He was the president of the German Football Association (DFB) from 2006 to 2012. For his contributions to German football, he received the Bundesverdienstkreuz in 2005.

== Career ==
Theo Zwanziger was an amateur player for his local VfL Altendiez, playing there until 1975. He studied law in Mainz and graduated in fiscal and constitutional law. Between 1980 and 1985, he worked as a judge in Koblenz before joining the government of Rhineland-Palatinate as a representative of the CDU.

In 1992, Zwanziger entered the DFB as a member of the executive board ("Mitglied des Vorstandes"). He was a vital part of the groundbreaking 2001 decision to grant autonomy to the German Bundesliga professional teams, letting them organise themselves in the DFL (Deutsche Fußball-Liga). In 2001, Zwanziger was made treasurer of the DFB and elected vice president in 2003. For his contributions to German football, he received the Bundesverdienstkreuz in 2005. On 8 December 2006, he was named co-president alongside Gerhard Mayer-Vorfelder. After Mayer-Vorfelder left the DFB to become UEFA vice president in 2007, he became the sole president of the DFB.

On 2 March 2012, he stepped down.

In March 2016, the FIFA Ethics Committee opened formal proceedings against Zwanziger regarding the awarding of the 2006 FIFA World Cup.

== Personal life ==
Zwanziger is married and has two sons.

== Litigation ==
When the renowned sport journalist Jens Weinreich called him an "unglaublicher Demagoge" (unbelievable demagogue), Zwanziger unsuccessfully asked the Landgericht Berlin (country court of Berlin) to issue a temporary injunction against this statement. Zwanziger later publicly announced to go to the court of Koblenz, his former place of work for another attempt, resulting in further criticism from the press and journalists' associations. As of March 2009, Zwanziger's legal attempts to silence Weinreich have all but failed. Weinreich has publicly stated that he fears Zwanziger might continue to use SLAPP tactics to outspend Weinreich, hence accepting donations from the public to cover his legal expenses. On 27 March 2009, Weinreich and the DFB agreed out of court.
