= Tennis Bundesliga (men) =

Tennis league in Germany

1. Bundesliga
- Most recent season or competition: 2019
- Sport: Tennis
- Founded: 1972; 54 years ago
- No. of teams: 10
- Country: Germany
- Confederation: DTB
- Most recent champion: TK Grün-Weiss Mannheim (7th title)
- Most titles: TC Blau-Weiss Neuss (10 titles)
- Sponsor: Tennis Point
- Relegation to: 2. Bundesliga
- Website: www.tennis-point-bundesliga.de

The Tennis Bundesliga or 1. Bundesliga is the top level of the German tennis league system. It was formed in 1972. Contested by 10 clubs it operates on a system of promotion and relegation with the 2. Bundesliga (formed in 2001). Seasons are usually played in the months of July and August.

Each team plays nine matches, one against each other team. A match between team consists of four singles matches followed by two doubles matches.

The company Tennis Point sponsors the league and has acquired the naming rights in 2009, which resulted in the official title of the competition being Tennis-Point-Bundesliga.

The 2019 season was the 48th season of the competition. 53 clubs have been part of the league since its inception. The most successful club is TC Blau-Weiss Neuss, winner of 10 championships. The reigning champions are TK Grün-Weiss Mannheim.

The 2020 season was cancelled due to the coronavirus pandemic.

== Competition format ==
Every club plays each other club once. In any given matchup four singles matches are played (usually a pair of matches followed by another pair) and then two doubles follow. All matches are best of three sets with the third set being a tiebreak to ten points, dubbed the Champions Tiebreak. In case both teams win three of their matches their matchup is considered a draw, however, sets and games are used as tiebreakers in the overall league standings. At the end of the season the team with the most points is crowned German champions.

== Clubs ==
Ten following clubs were scheduled to compete in the 2020 season of the Bundesliga. However, as the season was cancelled due to the coronavirus pandemic the same lineup of teams will just be used for the 2021 season. Sponsors' names are often part of the Bundesliga teams names. Thus for example the Rochusclub fields a Bundesliga team which itself is referred to as Allpresan Rochusclub Düsseldorf.

| Team | Location | Surface | Main sponsor |
|---|---|---|---|
| TK Kurhaus Bad Aachen | Aachen | Clay | Lambertz |
| Kölner THC Stadion Rot-Weiß | Cologne | Clay | |
| Rochusclub Düsseldorf | Düsseldorf | Clay | Allpresan |
| HTC Blau-Weiß Krefeld | Krefeld | Clay | Timberland Finance |
| TK GW Mannheim | Mannheim | Clay | |
| Gladbacher HTC | Mönchengladbach | Clay | Badwerk |
| TC Großhesselohe | Pullach | Clay | |
| TC Blau-Weiß Neuss | Neuss | Clay | |
| TSV 1860 Rosenheim | Rosenheim | Clay | |
| TuS Sennelager | Sennelager | Clay | Hämmerling |

Locations of the 2019 Bundesliga teams

== Champions ==
| Club | Wins | Winning years |
|---|---|---|
| Blau-Weiss Neuss | 10 | 1983, 1984, 1985, 1986, 1987, 1988, 1989, 1991, 1992, 1994 |
| TK Grün-Weiss Mannheim | 7 | 1993, 1996, 2005, 2007, 2010, 2018, 2019 |
| TC Amberg am Schanzl | 6 | 1978, 1979, 1980, 1981, 1982, 1998 |
| Blau-Weiss Halle | 5 | 1995, 2006, 2014, 2015, 2017 |
| TK Kurhaus Lambertz Aachen | 5 | 2008, 2009, 2011, 2012, 2013 |
| LTTC Rot-Weiß Berlin | 5 | 1972, 1973, 1974, 1975, 1976 |
| ETUF Essen | 4 | 1997, 1999, 2000, 2002 |
| Blau-Weiss Sundern | 2 | 2003, 2004 |
| Badwerk Gladbacher HTC | 1 | 2016 |
| Dinslakener TG Blau-Weiss | 1 | 2001 |
| Iphtos München | 1 | 1990 |
| HTV Hannover | 1 | 1977 |
