= Go-Bundesliga =

The Go-Bundesliga is the German championship for teams for the game of Go. It consists of five Leagues, of which some are split. The winner of the top league is German Team Go Champion. The competition takes place mainly at the KGS Go Server, from season 2016–2017 on matches will also be played at Pandanet. Each team is based on a location in Germany. Four players of one team compete against four players of the opposing team. The games are played on a monthly basis.

== List of the German Team Go Champions ==
Season	German team champion
2005–2006	Hamburg-Hebsacker
2006–2007	Karlsruhe
2007–2008	Karlsruhe
2008–2009	Karlsruhe
2009–2010	Karlsruhe
2010–2011	Hamburg-Hebsacker
2011–2012	Hamburg-Hebsacker
2012–2013	Berliner Zebrapinguine 1
2013–2014	Berliner Zebrapinguine 1
2014–2015	HH-Pauli
2015–2016	Hamburg-Hebsacker
