= Frederik Pleitgen =

German journalist (born 1976)

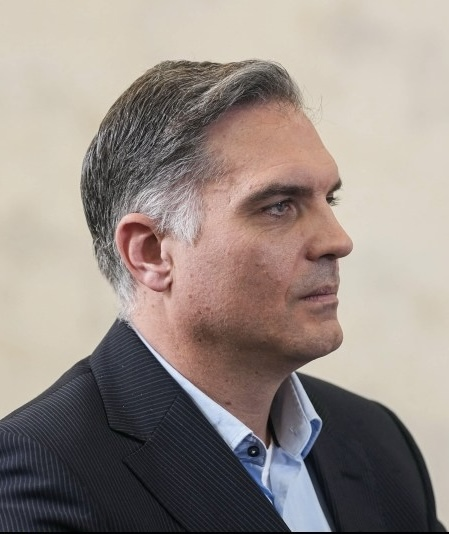
- Pleitgen in 2026
- Born: 19 August 1976 (age 49); Cologne, West Germany (now Germany)
- Occupation: Journalist
- Employer: CNN
- Father: Fritz Pleitgen

Frederik "Fred" Pleitgen (born 19 August 1976) is a German journalist who currently works as a Senior Correspondent for CNN International. He lives in Germany.

== Early life ==
Pleitgen is the son of German journalist and former director of public broadcaster Westdeutscher Rundfunk, Fritz Pleitgen. After attending school (including the German International School in Washington, D.C.), he studied North American Studies at the University of Bonn and the Free University of Berlin. He then spent a year at the School of Journalism at New York University and in 2004 received a fellowship at the Institute for Cultural Diplomacy in the San Fernando Valley. In 2005, Pleitgen received an Arthur F. Burns Fellowship, which he spent at the International Center for Journalists in Atlanta.

== Career ==
He worked for German television broadcasters ZDF and RTL as well as German news channel n-tv from 2000 before joining CNN in 2006. He reported from Iraq, from Pakistan in October 2010, from the 2011 Egyptian revolution and the civil wars in Libya and Syria. He filled in for Christiane Amanpour as host of the CNN program Amanpour. In Paris, he covered the aftermath of the 2015 Charlie Hebdo shooting. From May 2013 to December 2014, he again worked for RTL as nighttime co-anchor. However, he continued to work as a CNN international correspondent in Germany and covered the German team at the 2014 FIFA World Cup in Brazil. After leaving RTL in February 2015, Pleitgen became a full-time Senior International Correspondent for CNN International in London. In 2026, he reported from the war in Iran.

== Personal ==
As of 2023, after stays in the United States and London, he lives in Berlin.

== Filmography ==
Year	Title	Role	Notes
2015	The Martian	CNN reporter	

== Recognition ==
- 2017 Hanns Joachim Friedrichs Award for the coverage of crisis in the Middle East and Turkey
