= Egidius Braun =

German sports administrator (1925–2022)

8th President of the DFB
- In office 24 October 1992 – 28 April 2001
- Preceded by: Hermann Neuberger
- Succeeded by: Gerhard Mayer-Vorfelder

Personal details
- Born: 27 February 1925 Breinig, Germany
- Died: 16 March 2022 (aged 97) Aachen, Germany

Egidius Braun (27 February 1925 – 16 March 2022) was a German sports administrator who served as the eighth president of the German Football Association (German: Deutscher Fußball-Bund, DFB) from 1992 to 2001. Subsequently, he was appointed Honorary President. That same year, Braun founded the "DFB Foundation Egidius Braun", which takes care of distressed youth. Furthermore, the "Egidius-Braun Award" is awarded by the WDR. In 1985, he was awarded the Grand Cross with Star and Sash of the Bundesverdienstkreuz.

== Life ==
Braun was born in Breinig. At the age of 13, he was playing for SV Breinig. After graduation in 1943 in Alsdorf, he became a soldier in World War II and was taken prisoner, from which he was released in 1946. After returning, Braun studied law and philosophy and founded the company "Kartoffel-Braun" (Braun Potatoes). In addition he played football in the first team of SV Breinig. From 19 August 1956 to 20 February 1959, he was chairman of the club.

On 4 August 1973, Braun was elected president of the Middle Rhine Football Association and a member of the DFB Advisory Board. On 25 August of the same year he became Vice President of the Western German Football Association.

From 1983 to 1987, Braun was a member of the board of 1. FC Köln. On his 60th birthday, 27 February 1985, he was awarded the Federal Cross of Merit 1st class. He received the Federal Cross of Merit with Star in 1997. For his services to the country of North Rhine-Westphalia he was honored with the Order of Merit of the country in 1995.

From 1977 to 1992 he was treasurer of the DFB. On 24 October 1992, Braun was elected the eighth president of the DFB. That same year he also became a member of the board for the National Olympic Committee. Braun remained DFB president until 28 April 2001.

During the World Cup 1986 in Mexico, Braun visited with some international players, a Mexican orphanage and founded, in the wake of misery, Mexico Help of the Egidius Braun Foundation. Also due to his charitable commitment, Braun received many sympathies within the DFB, UEFA and from the whole environment of German football. Nonetheless, he was not spared of problematic situations. After the Germany national team was defeated at the 1994 FIFA World Cup in the United States, Braun had to justify his solidarity with criticized German national coach Berti Vogts. The "Bild" newspaper urged Vogts to resign. Two years later, national coach Vogts, won the European Championship.

Braun was married; the couple had two sons. He was a hunter and nature lover. The supporter of Alemannia lived in Aachen. On 16 October 2006, he suffered a stroke.

He died in Aachen on 16 March 2022, at the age of 97.

== Activities in UEFA ==
- 1980 to 2000 member of the UEFA European Championship Organizing Committee (from 24 June 1992 Chairman)
- 1988 to 2000 member of the UEFA Executive Committee
- 1992 to 2000 vice-president of UEFA
- 1995 to 1996 Acting treasurer of UEFA
- 1996 to 2000 UEFA Treasurer
