= Gerhard Mayer-Vorfelder =

German politician and sports administrator (1933–2015)

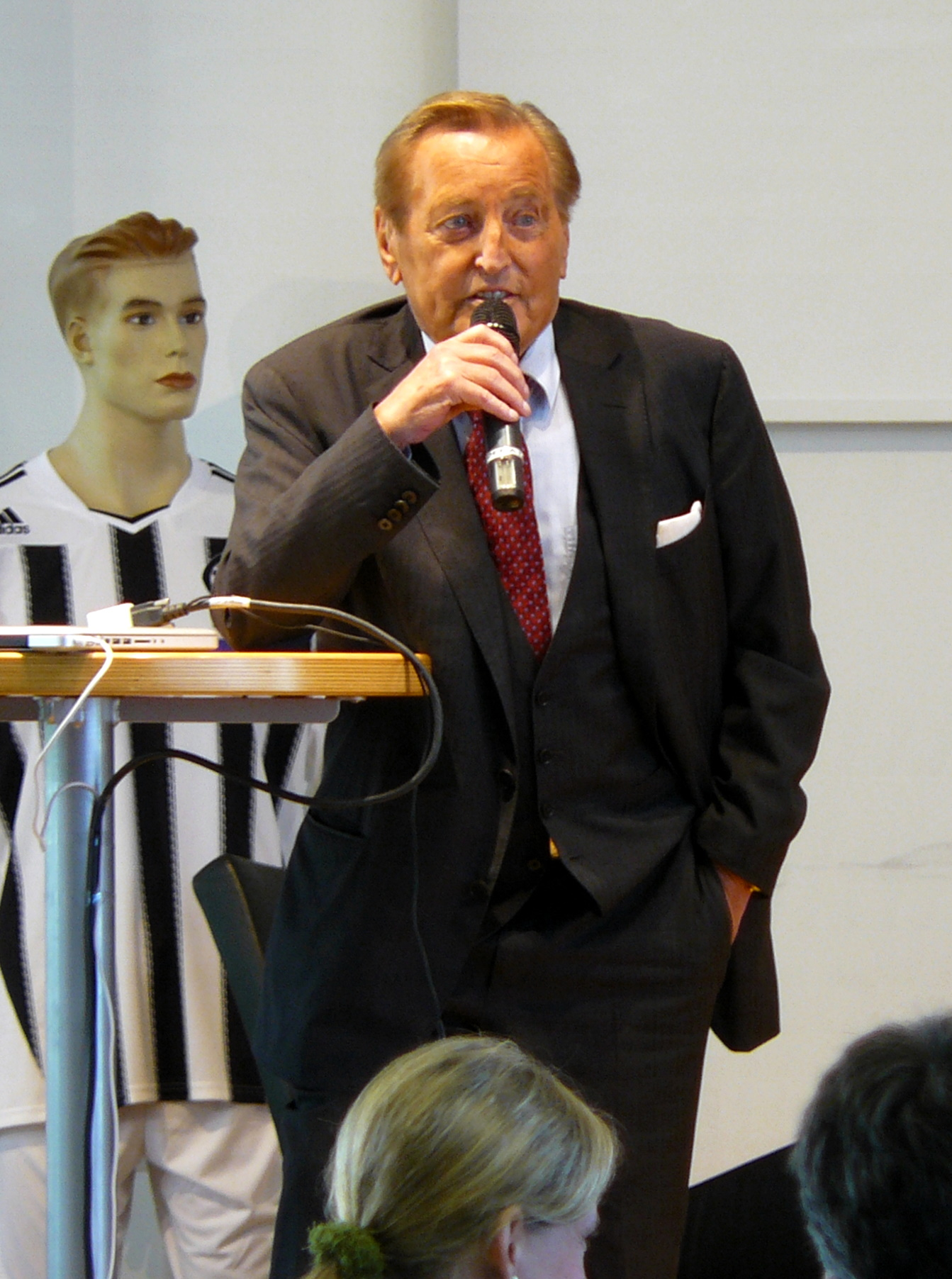
- Mayer-Vorfelder in 2011

9th President of the DFB
- In office 28 April 2001 – 8 September 2006 Serving with executive president Theo Zwanziger (2004–2006)
- Preceded by: Egidius Braun
- Succeeded by: Theo Zwanziger

Member of the Landtag of Baden-Württemberg from the district Stuttgart II
- In office 3 June 1980 – 31 May 2001

Minister of Finance of Baden-Württemberg
- In office 13 January 1991 – 11 November 1998
- Prime Minister: Erwin Teufel
- Preceded by: Guntram Palm
- Succeeded by: Gerhard Stratthaus

Minister of Culture, Youth and Sports of Baden-Württemberg
- In office 4 June 1980 – 13 January 1991
- Prime Minister: Lothar Späth
- Preceded by: Roman Herzog
- Succeeded by: Marianne Schultz-Hector

Personal details
- Born: Gerhard Mayer; 3 March 1933 Mannheim, Weimar Republic
- Died: 17 August 2015 (aged 82) Stuttgart, Germany
- Party: CDU

Gerhard Mayer-Vorfelder (né Mayer; 3 March 1933 – 17 August 2015), often called "MV", was the Vice President of the Union of European Football Associations (UEFA). Prior to his UEFA career, Mayer-Vorfelder was a politician of the Christian Democratic Union of Germany, and served in the state cabinet of Baden-Württemberg from 1976 to 1998. He was later president of German soccer club VfB Stuttgart, and the German Football Association.

== Biography ==
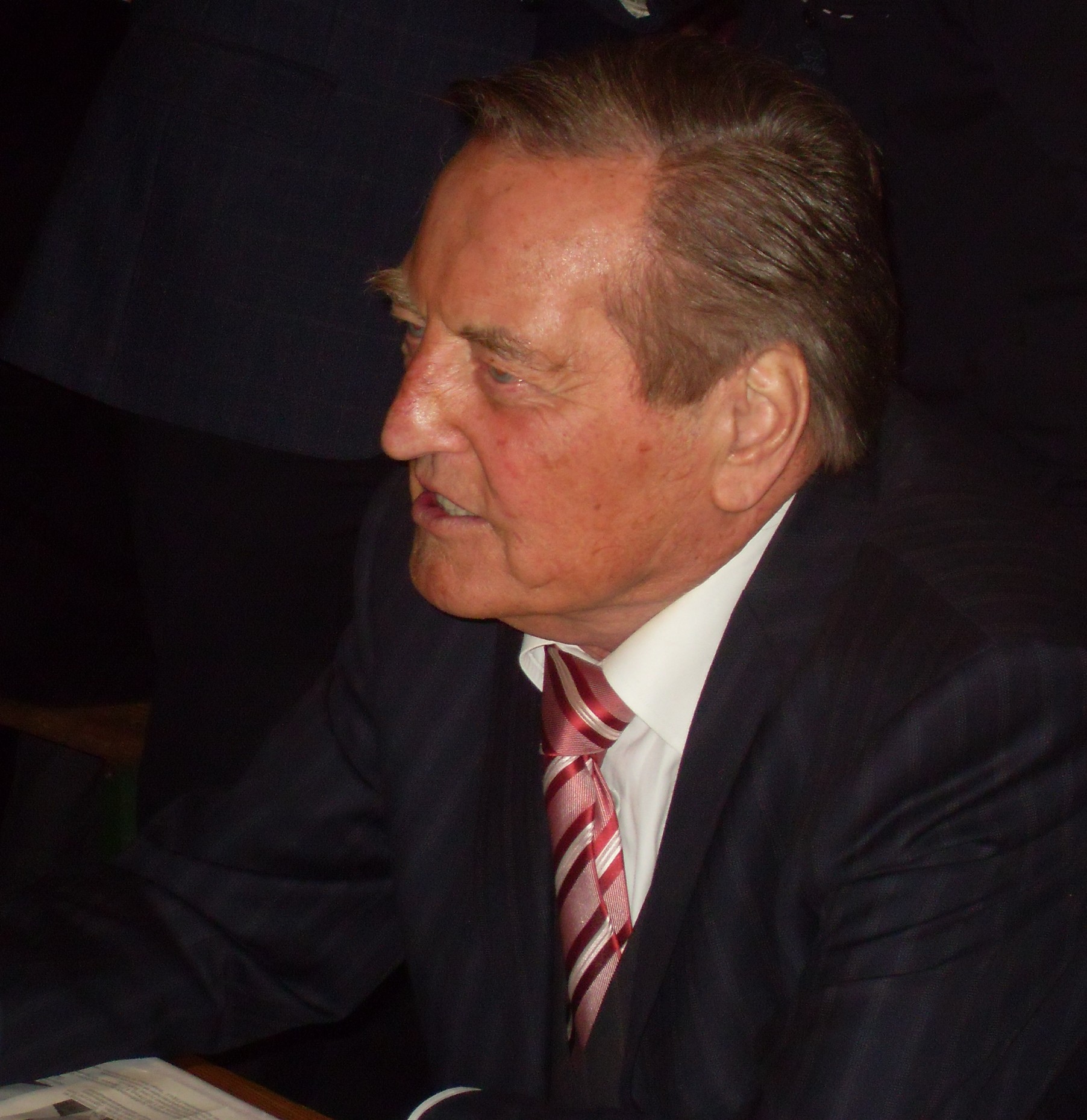
Gerhard Mayer-Vorfelder, 2009

Mayer-Vorfelder was born in Mannheim, and studied at the university of Freiburg, and Heidelberg University, graduating with a law degree in 1959. A CDU politician, he joined the government of Baden-Württemberg and was appointed permanent secretary at the State Ministry Baden-Württemberg with the rank of a cabinet member in 1976. From 1980 to 1991, he was Minister of Culture and Sports, and Minister of Finance from 1991 to 1998. He was also member of the German Bundesrat during that period. He is a co-founder of the Hans Filbinger Foundation.

Parallel to his CDU career, Mayer-Vorfelder entered the soccer world. In 1975, he became president of VfB Stuttgart, a position he held until 2000. In 2000, Mayer-Vorfelder succeeded Egidius Braun as president of the German Football Association. Narrowly surviving a vote of mistrust in 2004, he shared this duty with Theo Zwanziger until 2006. Mayer-Vorfelder died on 17 August 2015.

== Personal life ==
Mayer-Vorfelder was married to Margit Deutschle. His son, Michael Mayer-Vorfelder, played 3 games for VfB Stuttgart. On his FIFA page, Mayer-Vorfelder stated that his all-time favourite player was Franz Beckenbauer, and that the German Miracle of Bern World Cup win of 1954 was his favourite match.
