= Fritz Pleitgen =

German television journalist and author (1938–2022)

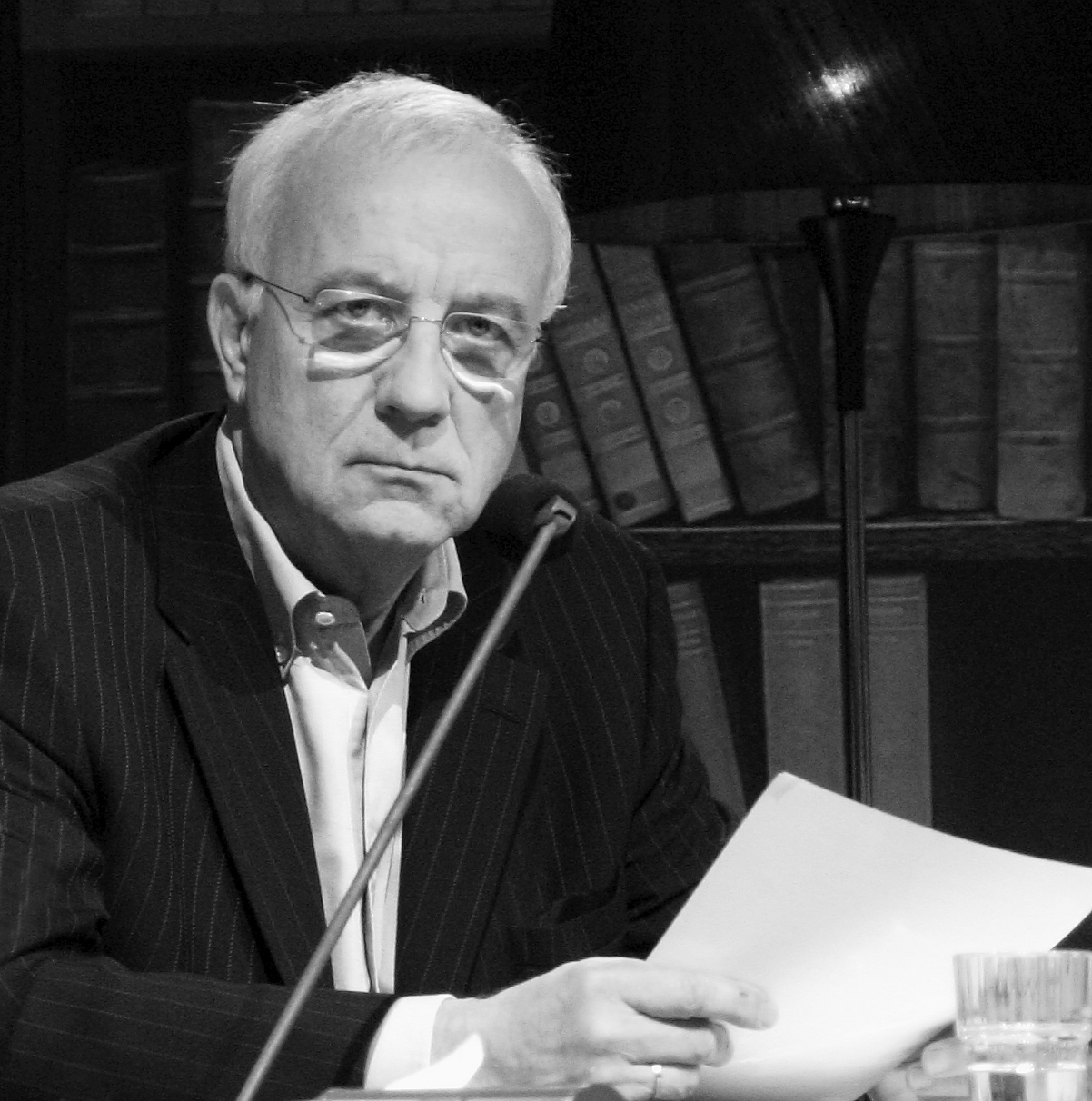
- Pleitgen in 2007
- Born: 21 March 1938; Duisburg-Meiderich, German Reich
- Died: 15 September 2022 (aged 84); Cologne, North Rhine-Westphalia, Germany
- Occupations: Journalist; Broadcasting director; Author
- Organizations: Westdeutscher Rundfunk
- Spouse: Gerda Lichtenberg (m. 1969)
- Children: 4, including Frederik
- Awards: Order of Merit of North Rhine-Westphalia; Order of Merit of the Federal Republic of Germany

Fritz Ferdinand Pleitgen (21 March 1938 – 15 September 2022) was a German television journalist and author. He was correspondent in Moscow, East Berlin and Washington. Pleitgen was a supporter of Willy Brandt's Ostpolitik. In 1988, Pleitgen became editor-in-chief of television of Germany's then-largest public broadcaster, Westdeutscher Rundfunk (WDR), and was director of WDR from 1995 to 2007. He is regarded as one of the most influential German journalists and media makers. In 2010, he was the manager of Ruhr.2010, a project of European Capital of Culture.

== Life and career ==
Pleitgen was born in Duisburg-Meiderich on 21 March 1938, the fifth child of a technical draftsman working at Krupp. He grew up in Bünde in East Westphalia and left high school without completing his programme, because he was already working for the Bünde local editorial office of Bielefeld's Freie Presse as a sports and court reporter. In 1961, he volunteered to become an editor.

In 1963, Pleitgen began working as a journalist at the German broadcaster WDR; he started as a reporter for Tagesschau. His duties included reporting from Brussels and Paris covering the European Economic Community and NATO. In 1967, he broadcast from the Middle East on the Six-Day War between Israel and its Arab neighbours. From 1970, Pleitgen reported as ARD's foreign correspondent from Moscow, where he accompanied Soviet leader Leonid Brezhnev on trips abroad. Without his own camera crew, he needed approval from the Soviet Foreign Ministry for almost all reports. Under constant KGB surveillance, he was the first Western journalist to have an interview with the General Secretary of the Communist Party. He also established contacts with dissidents like Andrei Sakharov, Lev Kopelev, Yuri Orlov, and Andrei Amalrik. From 1977, Pleitgen served as correspondent in East Berlin, but his work was restricted by the Stasi. His predecessor was expelled from the GDR. Erich Honecker invited Pleitgen to hunt rabbits in 1981, in contrast Pleitgen was also in contact with the dissidents Stefan Heym, and Robert Havemann. From 1982, he reported as ARD studio chief from Washington and New York and excelled in critical reporting on Ronald Reagan.

In 1988, director of WDR Friedrich Nowottny called Pleitgen back to the parent company in Germany to be editor-in-chief of WDR television in Cologne, and in 1994 he became director of radio. He moderated for ARD television Weltspiegel, ARD-Brennpunkt, and Presseclub. Known for his work during the Cold War, he became the television face of reunification. Pleitgen was director of the WDR from 1995 to 2007, (Note: Pleitgen was also elected by the CDU representatives in the SPD-dominated WDR broadcasting council.) succeeding his former boss Nowottny; from 2001 to 2002, he was chairman of the ARD. His motto was "Durch Qualität zur Quote" (through quality to ratings). He played a key role in the launch of the event and documentary channel Phoenix. One of his tasks was the establishment of regional studios. During his tenure, the surreptitious advertising scandal occurred. From 2006 to 2008, he was head of the European Broadcasting Union.

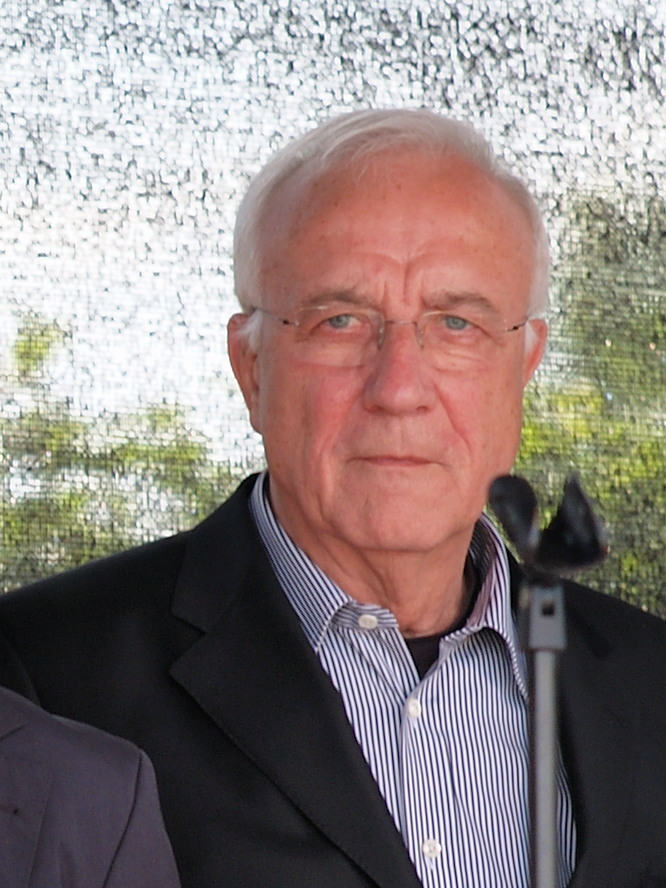
Pleitgen in 2010

After leaving WDR in 2007, Pleitgen took over the management of the European Capital of Culture 2010 project in Essen (Ruhr.2010) and officially retired in 2010. He took moral responsibility for the Love Parade disaster.

Considered one of the most influential German journalists and media makers, Pleitgen interviewed Ronald Reagan, Erich Honecker, Egon Krenz, Mikhail Gorbachev, and Helmut Kohl.

== Political views ==
Pleitgen appreciated the value of a free press, because of his own experiences with censorship in totalitarian states. According to Pleitgen, the German broadcaster ARD had features of a state media in the early years, but emancipated later.

Pleitgen was a supporter of Willy Brandt's Ostpolitik and in conflict with the Christian Social Union in Bavaria.

In 2019, he criticised the homogeneous reporting and warned of the decay of democracy. He stated in May 2021, that a concept for a policy with Russia is missing, Russians are Europeans. In March 2022, he admitted to having underestimated the danger posed by Russian president Vladimir Putin.

== Activities ==
- Member of the SPD
- Patron of Kinderhospiz Bethel, a children's hospice in Bielefeld
- 1998–2017 Chairman and 2017–2022 Honorary Chairman of the Board of the Lev Kopelev Forum
- 2007 Member of the Board of Trustees of Reporter ohne Grenzen (Reporters Without Borders)
- 2010–2021 President of the German Cancer Aid
- 2013–2020 Member of the Board of Trustees of the Alfried Krupp von Bohlen und Halbach Foundation

== Personal life ==
In 1969, Pleitgen married Gerda Lichtenberg; the couple had four children. One of his sons is journalist Frederik Pleitgen.

Pleitgen lived in Bergisch Gladbach. In 2020, he was diagnosed with pancreatic cancer, and died on 15 September 2022 in Cologne at the age of 84.

== Works ==
- Pleitgen, Fritz (2000). Der Sport im Fernsehen (in German). Cologne, Germany. ISBN 978-3-934156-16-6. OCLC 247672497.
- Biermann, Wolf; Pleitgen, Fritz (2001). Die Ausbürgerung: Anfang vom Ende der DDR (in German). Berlin, Germany: Ullstein. ISBN 3-89834-044-9. OCLC 49936401.
- Pleitgen, Fritz (2002). Durch den wilden Kaukasus (in German). Frankfurt am Main, Germany. ISBN 978-3-596-15274-2. OCLC 76326531.
- Dittert, Annette; Pleitgen, Fritz (2005). Der stille Bug Reise durch ein zerissenes Land (in German). Berlin, Germany. ISBN 978-3-548-36739-2. OCLC 76602093.
- Pleitgen, Fritz (2008). Väterchen Don der Fluss der Kosaken (in German). Cologne, Germany. ISBN 978-3-462-04046-3. OCLC 297579007.
- Pleitgen, Fritz; Schischkin, Michail (2019). Frieden oder Krieg Russland und der Westen – eine Annäherung (in German). Munich, Germany: Wilhelm Heyne Verlag München. ISBN 978-3-453-60581-7. OCLC 1204398549.
- Pleitgen, Fritz (2021). Eine unmögliche Geschichte als Politik und Bürger Berge versetzten (in German). Freiburg, Germany. ISBN 978-3-451-39053-1. OCLC 1258120322.

== Awards ==
- 1995: Saure Gurke, mocking award by feminist media professionals
- 1999: Närrisches Steckenpferd by Krefeld-based carnival association
- 1999: Georg Schulhoff Prize for professional training
- 2003: Josef Neuberger Medal by Düsseldorf's Jewish community
- 2004: Culture award by Free Masons
- 2005: Charlemagne Medal for the European Media
- 2006: Ambassador for 2006 INAS World Football Championships in Germany
- 2006: Honorary doctorate from Dortmund University
- 2007: Kulturgroschen awarded by German Cultural Council
- 2007: Order of Merit of North Rhine-Westphalia
- 2007: Willi Ostermann Medal in Gold, the highest Cologne Carnival honour
- 2009: Goldenes Lot by the Association of German Surveying Engineers
- 2012: Commander's Cross of the Order of Merit of the Federal Republic of Germany
- 2019: Brost Ruhr Prize
