= Vorstand =

German business term for the executive board of a company

In German corporate governance, a Vorstand is the executive board of a corporation (public limited company). It is hierarchically subordinate to the supervisory board (Aufsichtsrat), as German company law imposes a two-tier board of directors.

German law confers executive powers on the executive board as a body. It is expected to act collectively and collegially. Unlike the executive committee (a.k.a. operating committee or executive council) of a U.S. or UK company, the executive board is not an adjunct of the CEO (managing director). In contrast to Japanese corporate governance, the German executive board has real decision-making power. It is, by law, the managing body of a company and cannot be instructed by any legal person, be they natural or artificial, to act in such a way as to harm the business. Executive board members are personally liable for accepting any such instructions.

== Scope and structure ==
The specific scope of an executive board's duties varies from business to business. (A group of companies may each have their own individual executive boards, for example). The president of the executive board (i.e., the CEO) and the position's role are determined by the supervisory board. German law permits, but does not require, executive board members to elect a president/CEO from among their number. There are no specific legal requirements regarding the CEO's role, or even for the title given to the holder of the CEO position, although in practice the most common title is simply Vorstandsvorsitzender, literally, "Vorstand chairman". A noticeable minority refer to their CEOs as Sprecher (lit., "speaker"), implying that the CEO is no more than primus inter pares; probably the best-known example of a company which uses this terminology is Deutsche Bank.

The exact relationship between the CEO and the other executive officers depends on the company's type, how it was founded, and indeed the individual personalities of the people involved. A family business could, for example, have a strong CEO who is a member of the founding family and exercises a great deal of power over the rest of the board. In other companies, executive officers may hold themselves accountable to the executive board as a whole and not at all accountable to the CEO as an individual.

The relationships among executive officers can vary, too. It is common practice for board members to be senior executives with specific areas of functional responsibility. However, the law requires that they oversee the activities of their fellow officers, since they are still personally liable for any failings outside their specific departments/subdivisions. Each board member has one vote. Decisions are never escalated, when there is a lack of consensus, to the supervisory board. Executive board meetings are commonly held on a weekly basis and can last up to a whole day.

Formally, the power to appoint executive officers to the board lies with the supervisory board, which can appoint officers with a two-thirds majority vote of approval, or a simple majority if multiple rounds of voting are required in order to reach a decision. Since up to 50% of the supervisory board members are delegates of the employees (or even external trade union representatives, for details see Mitbestimmung), this prevents employees from blocking the appointment of executive officers to the executive board.

Executive officers have a certain degree of job security, which is partly a preventative measure aimed at ensuring that executive boards are not dominated and that they are not "packed" with hand-picked appointees. Officers are usually appointed for the maximum statutory term—5 years. Removal must be for good cause, such as serious breach of duty, and is subject to the supervisory board's veto. When an executive officer's ability to perform their duties is diminished due to old age, it is customary for them to serve out the remainder of their term, but with a deputy to help perform their duties. Neither the shareholders nor the executive board can compel an officer to retire, whereas the supervisory board can.

Commonly, the CEO receives between 30% and 50% greater salary than that of the other executive officers. An officer's remuneration usually comprises 65% basic salary, and 35% that is equally split between annual bonuses and benefits.

== See also ==
- Vorstandsassistent
