= Bundesliga-Gruppe =

German football operating company

- Founded: 19 December 2000; 25 years ago
- Country: Germany
- Confederation: UEFA
- Chairman: Hans-Joachim Watzke
- Divisions: Bundesliga; 2. Bundesliga
- Number of clubs: 36
- Level on pyramid: 1–2
- Relegation to: 3. Liga
- Domestic cup: DFB-Pokal
- Current champions: Bayern Munich (Bundesliga)
- Website: www.dfl.de

The Bundesliga-Gruppe GmbH (or simply Bundesliga-Gruppe or Bundesliga GmbH; lit. 'Bundesliga-Group') is a league and wholly owned subsidiary of Bundesliga e.V.. The Bundesliga-Gruppe is responsible for entire operating business of the Bundesliga and 2. Bundesliga leagues.

Since 1 July 2001, the Bundesliga-Gruppe has organised the Bundesliga and 2. Bundesliga. From 2005 until 2007, they also organised the DFL-Ligapokal. Since 2010, the Bundesliga-Gruppe also has organised the Franz Beckenbauer Supercup.

== Function ==
The then called DFL was founded on 19 December 2000 as an independent GmbH. Since then, the Bundesliga e.V.. has been the sole shareholder of the Bundesliga-Gruppe, which has provided the capital stock in the amount of €1 million. The organisation is a subsidiary of the Bundesliga e.V., which acts as a representative for the 36 professional clubs in the top two leagues of German football. Today the Bundesliga and 2. Bundesliga are operated by the Bundesliga-Gruppe, but jointly hosted with the German Football Association (Deutscher Fußball-Bund, DFB).

== Duties ==
The Bundesliga-Gruppe itself divides its operating business into the areas of operation, licensing, and marketing. The "operations" business area includes, in particular, the management of the licensed players' activities and the organisation of the competitions of the Bundesliga e.V., which includes the Bundesliga, 2. Bundesliga, and Franz Beckenbauer Supercup, along with the promotion/relegation play-offs.

The business area of "marketing" includes the allocation of broadcasting rights and licenses for the leagues on various media platforms, including television, radio, and on the Internet. The Bundesliga broadcasting rights include a total of 209 territories around the world.

The third business area, "licensing", is the implementation and development of the former DFB licensing procedure. The Bundesliga-Gruppe applies the procedure for the clubs of the Bundesliga and the 2. Bundesliga, as well as for some of the clubs of the lower leagues under a business contract. In doing so, the DFL will examine the extent to which the individual clubs fulfill the requirements for participation in the professional football competitions. The list of requirements includes sporting, financial, legal, infrastructural, personnel, administrative, media, and safety-related criteria. Highly important, and to date the only criterion which led to major problems for certain clubs, is the financial criterion. With this criterion the Bundesliga-Gruppe tries to ascertain that all clubs remain solvent during the season in order to be able to maintain the club operations for as long as possible. The Bundesliga-Gruppe can refuse to issue a license if a club does not meet these requirements.

Since 1 September 2012, the new organizational structure of the Bundesliga-Gruppe now sees only two business areas rather than three.

With 23 other national professional league associations, the Bundesliga-Gruppe is founding member of the World Leagues Forum, founded in Zürich in February 2016. The organisation aims, among other things, to centrally combine and represent the interests of the professional leagues and their common views before FIFA and other institutions engaged in sports and politics.

== Subsidiaries ==
- DFL Foundation
- Bundesliga International GmbH (formerly DFL Sports Enterprises GmbH)
- DFL Digital Sports GmbH
- Sportcast GmbH
  - HD SAT Communication GmbH
  - Livecast TV Produktion GmbH
  - Sportec Solutions GmbH
  - DFA Deutsches Fußball Archiv GmbH
- Liga Travel GmbH

== Bodies ==
The leadership of the Bundesliga, which includes the CEO and the supervisory, attend the annual shareholders' meeting. Part of the supervisory board of the Bundesliga-Gruppe forms a personal union with the Vorstand of Bundesliga e.V..

Wilfried Straub was the first CEO of the Bundesliga-Gruppe, serving from 2001 until 2005. In 2005, Christian Seifert became the chief executive. His contract ended 2021. In 2022 Donata Hopfen became the first female CEO of the Bundesliga-Gruppe. In February 2022, she was open to plans to introduce playoffs in the Bundesliga. There is also the idea of holding the Supercup abroad.

Supervisory board of the Bundesliga-Gruppe GmbH
Name	Since	Function
Hans-Joachim Watzke	2022	Chairman
Oliver Leki	2019	Deputy chairman
Rüdiger Fritsch	2022	Member
Ralf Huschen	2022	Member
Christian Keller	2023	Member
Stephan Schippers	2010	Member

Management of the Bundesliga-Gruppe GmbH
Name	Since	Function
Marc Lenz & Steffen Merkel	2023	Chief executive officers

All chief executive officers of the Bundesliga-Gruppe GmbH
Period	Name
2001–2005	Wilfried Straub
2005–2022	Christian Seifert
2022	Donata Hopfen
2023	Axel Hellmann & Oliver Leki (interim)
2023–present	Marc Lenz & Steffen Merkel
