= 2012–13 FC Nordsjælland season =

Nordsjælland
2012–13 season
- Manager: Kasper Hjulmand
- Stadium: Farum Park (Home stadium); Parken Stadium (Note: The club played its UEFA Champions League matches at Parken Stadium in Copenhagen instead of its regular stadium, Farum Park in Farum.) (Temporary stadium)
- Danish Superliga: 2nd
- Danish Cup: Fourth round
- UEFA Champions League: Group stage
- Top goalscorer: League: Joshua John (10)
- Biggest win: 6–1 v Silkeborg IF (Home, 11 August 2012, Danish Superliga)
- Biggest defeat: 1–6 v Chelsea (Away, 5 December 2012, UEFA Champions League)
Home colours	Away colours	Third colours

The 2012–13 season was Football Club Nordsjælland's 11th consecutive season in the Danish Superliga. In addition to the domestic league, Nordsjælland participated in the Danish Cup and the UEFA Champions League.

== Squad ==
Squad at end of season

Note: Flags indicate national team as defined under FIFA eligibility rules; some limited exceptions apply. Players may hold more than one non-FIFA nationality.

No.	Pos.	Nation	Player
1	GK	DEN	Jesper Hansen
2	DF	DEN	Jores Okore
3	DF	CRC	Francisco Calvo
4	MF	USA	Conor O'Brien
5	MF	DEN	Anders Christiansen
7	MF	DEN	Nicolai Stokholm
8	DF	DEN	Patrick Mtiliga
9	FW	BRA	Ricardo Bueno
11	FW	DEN	Morten Nordstrand
12	DF	POR	João Pereira
13	MF	DEN	Oğuz Han Aynaoğlu
14	MF	SWE	Joe Sise
15	FW	NED	Joshua John
16	GK	DEN	Thomas Villadsen
17	MF	DEN	Søren Christensen

No.	Pos.	Nation	Player
18	FW	DEN	Uffe Bech
19	DF	DEN	Mark Gundelach
20	MF	DEN	Kasper Lorentzen
21	MF	CRO	Ivan Runje
23	MF	CRO	Mario Tičinović
24	MF	GHA	Kamal Issah
28	FW	DEN	Nichlas Rohde
30	MF	DEN	Lasse Petry
32	GK	DEN	Jannich Storch
33	DF	DEN	Pascal Gregor
34	MF	DEN	Emiliano Marcondes
35	DF	DEN	Andreas Maxsø
36	FW	DEN	Kristian Lindberg
39	DF	DEN	Nicolai Johannesen

== Competitions ==
=== Overview ===
Competition	First match	Last match	Starting round	Final position	Record							
Competition	First match	Last match	Starting round	Final position	Pld	W	D	L	GF	GA	GD	Win %
Danish Superliga	16 July 2012	20 May 2013	Matchday 1	2nd	33	17	9	7	60	37	+23	51.52
Danish Cup	25 September 2012	31 October 2012	Third round	Fourth round	2	1	0	1	5	4	+1	50.00
UEFA Champions League	19 September 2012	5 December 2012	Group stage	Group stage	6	0	1	5	4	22	−18	0.00
Total					41	18	10	13	69	63	+6	43.90

Source: Competitions

=== Danish Superliga ===
==== League table ====
Pos	Team	Pld	W	D	L	GF	GA	GD	Pts	Qualification or relegation
1	Copenhagen (C)	33	18	11	4	62	32	+30	65	Qualification for the Champions League group stage
2	Nordsjælland	33	17	9	7	60	37	+23	60	Qualification for the Champions League third qualifying round
3	Randers FC	33	15	7	11	36	42	−6	52	Qualification for the Europa League third qualifying round
4	Esbjerg fB	33	13	8	12	38	32	+6	47	Qualification for the Europa League play-off round
5	AaB	33	13	8	12	51	46	+5	47	Qualification for the Europa League second qualifying round

Source: Danish Football Association (in Danish)
Rules for classification: 1) points; 2) goal difference; 3) number of goals scored.
(C) Champions

==== Results summary ====
Overall								Home						Away					
Pld	W	D	L	GF	GA	GD	Pts	W	D	L	GF	GA	GD	W	D	L	GF	GA	GD
33	17	9	7	60	37	+23	60	11	5	1	41	15	+26	6	4	6	19	22	−3

Source: Danish Football Association (in Danish)

==== Results by round ====
Round	1	2	3	4	5	6	7	8	9	10	11	12	13	14	15	16	17	18	19	20	21	22	23	24	25	26	27	28	29	30	31	32	33
Ground	A	A	H	A	H	A	H	H	A	H	H	A	H	H	A	H	A	A	H	A	H	A	A	H	H	A	H	A	H	A	H	A	H
Result	W	L	D	D	W	W	W	D	L	D	W	L	W	W	W	D	W	L	W	L	W	D	W	W	W	W	L	D	D	D	W	L	W
Position	2	4	4	7	5	4	2	3	3	3	3	4	3	3	2	2	2	2	2	2	2	2	2	2	2	2	2	2	2	2	2	2	2
Points	3	3	4	5	8	11	14	15	15	16	19	19	22	25	28	29	32	32	35	35	38	39	42	45	48	51	51	52	53	54	57	57	60

Source: Worldfootball.net
A = Away; H = Home; W = Win; D = Draw; L = Loss

==== Matches ====
16 July 2012 1	Horsens	0–4	Nordsjælland	Horsens
19:00 CEST (UTC+2)	Spelmann (yellow card) 24' (yellow-red card) 28'	Report	Lorentzen 7'; Laudrup 32'; Kildentoft (yellow card) 36'; Runje (yellow card) 44'; Stokholm 83'; Gytkjær 90+3'	Stadium: CASA Arena Horsens

21 July 2012 2	Midtjylland	3–1	Nordsjælland	Herning
17:00 CEST (UTC+2)	Hassan 13'; Sly (yellow card) 21'; Afriyie (yellow card) 30'; Janssen 34'; Uzochukwu (yellow card) 45+2'; Albæk 54'	Report	Christensen (yellow card) 42'; Stokholm 90+4'	Stadium: MCH Arena

29 July 2012 3	Nordsjælland	1–1	OB	Farum
19:00 CEST (UTC+2)	Christensen 16', (yellow card) 90'; Parkhurst (yellow card) 75'	Report	Christiansen (yellow card) 23'; Traoré 81'; N'Koum (yellow card) 90+1'	Stadium: Farum Park

4 August 2012 4	AaB	1–1	Nordsjælland	Aalborg
17:00 CEST (UTC+2)	Andersen (yellow card) 59'; Nielsen (yellow card) 60', (goal) 85'	Report	Okore (yellow card) 62'; Parkhurst (yellow card) 73'; Mtiliga (yellow card) 86'; John 88'	Stadium: Energi Nord Arena

11 August 2012 5	Nordsjælland	6–1	Silkeborg IF	Farum
17:00 CEST (UTC+2)	John 3', 27', 34', 36'; Parkhurst 6'; Okore (yellow card) 69'; Lorentzen 78'	Report	Risgård (yellow card) 43'; Bech 63'; Viðarsson (yellow card) 75'	Stadium: Farum Park

19 August 2012 6	AGF	0–1	Nordsjælland	Aarhus
17:00 CEST (UTC+2)		Report	Beckmann (yellow card) 23'; Okore (yellow card) 38'; Parkhurst 75'; Runje (yellow card) 81'	Stadium: NRGi Park

24 August 2012 7	Nordsjælland	4–1	SønderjyskE	Farum
18:30 CEST (UTC+2)	John 4'; Mtiliga 51'; Christensen 55'; Gundelach (yellow card) 72'; Beckmann (yellow card) 78'	Report	Antipas 34'	Stadium: Farum Park

2 September 2012 8	Nordsjælland	0–0	Brøndby	Farum
17:00 CEST (UTC+2)	Tičinović (yellow card) 35'; Beckmann (yellow card) 83'	Report	Gehrt (yellow card) 27'; Holst (yellow card) 47'	Stadium: Farum Park

15 September 2012 9	Copenhagen	2–1	Nordsjælland	Copenhagen
19:00 CEST (UTC+2)	Vetokele 72'; Delaney (yellow card) 73'; Kristensen (yellow card) 75'; Cornelius 79'; Bengtsson (yellow card) 88'	Report	Christensen 45+1' (o.g.); Adu (yellow card) 59'; Okore (yellow card) 67'; Christiansen (yellow card) 88'; Stokholm (yellow card) 90+1'; Mtiliga (yellow card) 90+3'	Stadium: Parken Stadium

22 September 2012 10	Nordsjælland	1–1	Randers FC	Farum
17:00 CEST (UTC+2)	John 32'; Adu (yellow card) 49'; Stokholm (yellow card) 90+1'	Report	Schwartz 45'	Stadium: Farum Park

28 September 2012 11	Nordsjælland	3–0	Esbjerg fB	Farum
18:30 CEST (UTC+2)	John 32'; Adu (yellow card) 44'; Lorentzen 51'; Stokholm 89'	Report	Toutouh (red card) 49'	Stadium: Farum Park

5 October 2012 12	OB	3–0	Nordsjælland	Odense
18:30 CEST (UTC+2)	Høegh (yellow card) 11'; Vadócz 32', 71'; Kadrii 35'; Falk (yellow card) 37'	Report	Beckmann (yellow card) 85'; John (yellow card) 86'	Stadium: TRE-FOR Park

19 October 2012 13	Nordsjælland	3–0	Silkeborg IF	Farum
18:30 CEST (UTC+2)	Nordstrand 72'; Okore 75'; Laudrup 79'	Report	Kiilerich (yellow card) 88'	Stadium: Farum Park

26 October 2012 14	Nordsjælland	1–0	AaB	Farum
18:30 CEST (UTC+2)	Okore 19'; Nordstrand (yellow card) 43'	Report	K. Petersen (yellow card) 29'	Stadium: Farum Park

3 November 2012 15	SønderjyskE	1–2	Nordsjælland	Haderslev
17:00 CET (UTC+1)	Bechmann 33', (yellow card) 44'	Report	Nordstrand 40'; Beckmann 72'; Runje (yellow card) 90+2'	Stadium: Haderslev Fodboldstadion

10 November 2012 16	Nordsjælland	2–2	Randers FC	Farum
17:00 CET (UTC+1)	Christensen 4'; Parkhurst (yellow card) 69'; Stokholm 82' (pen.); Mtiliga (yellow card) 85'	Report	Fischer 1'; Schwartz 72'; Thomsen (yellow card) 82'; Keller (yellow card) 82'	Stadium: Farum Park

16 November 2012 17	AGF	0–2	Nordsjælland	Aarhus
18:30 CET (UTC+1)		Report	John 57'; Nordstrand (yellow card) 64'; Lorentzen 65'; Adu (yellow card) 90'	Stadium: NRGi Park

25 November 2012 18	Esbjerg fB	1–0	Nordsjælland	Esbjerg
14:00 CET (UTC+1)	Lange (yellow card) 12'; Ernemann 49'	Report	Beckmann (yellow card) 87'	Stadium: Blue Water Arena

2 December 2012 19	Nordsjælland	3–0	Brøndby	Farum
19:00 CET (UTC+1)	Christiansen 4'; Adu (yellow card) 13'; Parkhurst (yellow card) 48'; Beckmann 54'; Mtiliga (yellow card) 64'; Tičinović 90'	Report		Stadium: Farum Park

9 December 2012 20	Copenhagen	4–1	Nordsjælland	Copenhagen
19:00 CET (UTC+1)	Santin (yellow card) 15', (goal) 38', 52'; Delaney 24'; Kristensen (yellow card) 65'; Cornelius 90+2'	Report	Beckmann (yellow card) 9', (goal) 76' (pen.); Tičinović (yellow card) 35'; Christiansen (yellow card) 65'	Stadium: Parken Stadium

3 March 2013 21	Nordsjælland	1–0	Horsens	Farum
14:00 CET (UTC+1)	Lindberg 9'; Bech (yellow card) 37'; Drachmann (yellow card) 38'; Mtiliga (yellow card) 63'; Bueno (yellow card) 79'	Report	Retov (yellow card) 34'; Takyi (yellow card) 38'; Drachmann (yellow card) 77'; Andersen (yellow card) 90+1'	Stadium: Farum Park

11 March 2013 22	Midtjylland	1–1	Nordsjælland	Herning
19:00 CET (UTC+1)	Bak (yellow card) 59'; Albæk 70'	Report	Okore (yellow card) 18'; Bech 42'; Mtiliga (yellow card) 88'	Stadium: MCH Arena

29 March 2013 24	Nordsjælland	4–2	AGF	Farum
15:00 CET (UTC+1)	Christensen 23', 61'; Runje (yellow card) 37'; John 38'; Nordstrand 58'	Report	S. Petersen 53', 76'	Stadium: Farum Park

1 April 2013 25	Nordsjælland	3–1	Midtjylland	Farum
15:00 CEST (UTC+2)	Nordstrand 10'; Mtiliga (yellow card) 45'; Bech 47'; Okore 72'	Report	Andersson 3'; Ma. Larsen (yellow card) 45'; Olsen (yellow card) 88'	Stadium: Farum Park

4 April 2013 23	AaB	0–1	Nordsjælland	Aalborg
18:00 CEST (UTC+2)		Report	Augustinussen 5' (o.g.); Tičinović (yellow card) 75'	Stadium: Energi Nord Arena

7 April 2013 26	Horsens	0–2	Nordsjælland	Horsens
14:00 CEST (UTC+2)		Report	John (yellow card) 30'; Petry 36'; Nordstrand 72'; Lindberg (yellow card) 74'	Stadium: CASA Arena Horsens

15 April 2013 27	Nordsjælland	2–3	Copenhagen	Farum
19:00 CEST (UTC+2)	Mtiliga 7', (yellow card) 86'; Nordstrand 26', (yellow card) 90+4'; Stokholm (yellow card) 31'	Report	Sigurðsson 5'; Stadsgaard (yellow card) 9'; Kristensen (yellow card) 9'; Vetokele 66'; Cornelius 78'	Stadium: Farum Park

21 April 2013 28	Randers FC	0–0	Nordsjælland	Randers
13:00 CEST (UTC+2)	Theódór (yellow card) 77'; Tamboura (yellow card) 82'; Kamper (yellow card) 90+2'	Report	Lindberg (yellow card) 18'; O'Brien (yellow card) 63'	Stadium: AutoC Park Randers

27 April 2013 29	Nordsjælland	2–2	SønderjyskE	Farum
17:00 CEST (UTC+2)	Christensen 21', (yellow card) 38'; Stokholm (yellow card) 56'; Nordstrand 70'	Report	Absalonsen 37'; Vibe 47'; Bechmann (yellow card) 56'; Jónasson (yellow card) 82'	Stadium: Farum Park

3 May 2013 30	Silkeborg IF	2–2	Nordsjælland	Silkeborg
18:30 CEST (UTC+2)	Svensson 49'; Kiilerich (yellow card) 60'; Risgård 69'; Pourié (yellow card) 80'; Hansen (yellow card) 84'	Report	Tičinović 16'; Okore (yellow card) 21', (goal) 85'; Christiansen (yellow card) 74'; Petry (yellow card) 81'	Stadium: Mascot Park

10 May 2013 31	Nordsjælland	4–1	OB	Farum
18:30 CEST (UTC+2)	Stokholm 15'; Petry (yellow card) 38'; Christiansen 65', 67'; Aynaoğlu 85'	Report	Pedersen 50'	Stadium: Farum Park

16 May 2013 32	Brøndby	4–0	Nordsjælland	Brøndby
19:00 CEST (UTC+2)	Makienok 19', 75'; Rommedahl 38'; Phiri 58'	Report	Gundelach (yellow card) 8'; Stokholm (yellow card) 12' (yellow-red card) 41'; Mtiliga (yellow card) 66'	Stadium: Brøndby Stadium

20 May 2013 33	Nordsjælland	1–0	Esbjerg fB	Farum
17:00 CEST (UTC+2)	O'Brien 33'; Gundelach (yellow card) 56'	Report	Ankersen (yellow card) 66'	Stadium: Farum Park

=== Danish Cup ===
25 September 2012 Third round	Svebølle BI	1–3 (a.e.t.)	Nordsjælland	Svebølle
16:30 CEST (UTC+2)	Mo. Larsen 83'	Report	Kildentoft 2'; Lorentzen 113'; Christiansen 120'	Stadium: Svebølle Stadion

31 October 2012 Fourth round	Nordsjælland	2–3 (a.e.t.)	Midtjylland	Farum
19:00 CET (UTC+1)	Tičinović 14'; Lindberg 86'	Report	Ma. Larsen 10', 33'; Albæk 115'	Stadium: Farum Park

=== UEFA Champions League ===
==== Group stage ====
Pos	Team	Pld	W	D	L	GF	GA	GD	Pts	Qualification	JUV	SHK	CHE	NOR
1	(Italy) Juventus	6	3	3	0	12	4	+8	12	Advance to knockout phase	—	1–1	3–0	4–0
2	(Ukraine) Shakhtar Donetsk	6	3	1	2	12	8	+4	10 (Note: Tied on head-to-head points (3) and head-to-head goal difference (0). Head-to-head away goals: Shakhtar Donetsk 2, Chelsea 1.)	Advance to knockout phase	0–1	—	2–1	2–0
3	(England) Chelsea	6	3	1	2	16	10	+6	10	Transfer to Europa League	2–2	3–2	—	6–1
4	(Denmark) Nordsjælland	6	0	1	5	4	22	−18	1		1–1	2–5	0–4	—

Source: Soccerway
Notes:

19 September 2012 1	Shakhtar Donetsk (Ukraine)	2–0	(Denmark) Nordsjælland	Donetsk, Ukraine
21:45 EEST (UTC+3)	Luiz Adriano (yellow card) 36'; Mkhitaryan 44', 76'; Srna (yellow card) 68'	Report	Hansen (yellow card) 36'; Christensen (yellow card) 42'; Lorentzen (yellow card) 59'; John (yellow card) 78'; Mtiliga (yellow card) 82'	Stadium: Donbas Arena; Attendance: 45,816; Referee: Paweł Gil (Poland); Assistant referees: Piotr Sadczuk (Poland), Marcin Borkowski (Poland); Fourth official: Konrad Sapela (Poland); Goal-line assistants: Robert Małek (Poland), Hubert Siejewicz (Poland)

2 October 2012 2	Nordsjælland (Denmark)	0–4	(England) Chelsea	Copenhagen, Denmark
20:45 CEST (UTC+2)	Runje (yellow card) 77'	Report	Mata 33', 82'; David Luiz 79'; Ramires 89'	Stadium: Parken Stadium; Attendance: 25,120; Referee: Marijo Strahonja (Croatia); Assistant referees: Siniša Premužaj (Croatia), Igor Krmar (Croatia); Fourth official: Ivica Modrić (Croatia); Goal-line assistants: Igor Pristovnik (Croatia), Ante Vučemilović (Croatia)

23 October 2012 3	Nordsjælland (Denmark)	1–1	(Italy) Juventus	Copenhagen, Denmark
20:45 CEST (UTC+2)	Beckmann 50'; Runje (yellow card) 68'; Mtiliga (yellow card) 83'	Report	Marchisio (yellow card) 37'; Chiellini (yellow card) 49'; Vučinić 81'	Stadium: Parken Stadium; Attendance: 22,404; Referee: Deniz Aytekin (Germany); Assistant referees: Guido Kleve (Germany), Stefan Lupp (Germany); Fourth official: Holger Henschel (Germany); Goal-line assistants: Marco Fritz (Germany), Guido Winkmann (Germany)

7 November 2012 4	Juventus (Italy)	4–0	(Denmark) Nordsjælland	Turin, Italy
20:45 CET (UTC+1)	Marchisio 6', (yellow card) 55'; Vidal 23'; Giovinco 37'; Pogba (yellow card) 67'; Quagliarella 75'	Report		Stadium: Juventus Stadium; Attendance: 31,366; Referee: Aleksandar Stavrev (Macedonia); Assistant referees: Marjan Kirovski (Macedonia), Dejan Kostadinov (Macedonia); Fourth official: Dusko Miloseski (Macedonia); Goal-line assistants: Dimitar Meckarovski (Macedonia), Goran Spirkoski (Macedonia)

20 November 2012 5	Nordsjælland (Denmark)	2–5	(Ukraine) Shakhtar Donetsk	Copenhagen, Denmark
20:45 CET (UTC+1)	Nordstrand 24'; Lorentzen 29'; Adu (yellow card) 64'; Christiansen (yellow card) 90'; Parkhurst (yellow card) 90+2'	Report	Luiz Adriano 26', 53', 81', (yellow card) 67'; Willian 44', 50'; Kucher (yellow card) 90'	Stadium: Parken Stadium; Attendance: 17,054; Referee: Antony Gautier (France); Assistant referees: Michael Annonier (France), Frédéric Cano (France); Fourth official: Eric Dansault (France); Goal-line assistants: Ruddy Buquet (France), Olivier Thual (France)

5 December 2012 6	Chelsea (England)	6–1	(Denmark) Nordsjælland	London, England
19:45 GMT (UTC)	Hazard (penalty missed) 35'; David Luiz 38' (pen.), (yellow card) 90'; Torres 45+2', 56'; Cahill 51'; Mata 63'; Oscar 71'	Report	Stokholm (penalty missed) 32'; Christiansen (yellow card) 37'; John 46'; Parkhurst (yellow card) 50'; Mtiliga (yellow card) 84'	Stadium: Stamford Bridge; Attendance: 40,048; Referee: Bas Nijhuis (Netherlands); Assistant referees: Angelo Boonman (Netherlands), Rob van de Ven (Netherlands); Fourth official: Bas van Dongen (Netherlands); Goal-line assistants: Pol van Boekel (Netherlands), Richard Liesveld (Netherlands)
