= 2014–15 SønderjyskE season =

Danish football club season

SønderjyskE is a Danish football team. The club plays in the top tier of Danish football, the Danish Superliga. Their home is Haderslev Fodboldstadion in Haderslev. During the 2014-15 campaign they will be competing in the following competitions: Superliga, Danish Cup.

== Superliga ==
19 July 2014 Match 1	SønderjyskE	0-0	AaB	Haderslev
17:00 CET	Morten Beck (yellow card) 28'	Summary	Petersen (yellow card) 17'; Augustinussen (yellow card) 47'	Stadium: Sydbank Park; Attendance: 3,228; Referee: (Denmark) Jakob Kehlet

27 July 2014 Match 2	Esbjerg fB	1-1	SønderjyskE	Esbjerg
19:00 CET	Ankersen (yellow card) 28'; Pušić 60' (yellow card) 88'	Summary	Marxen (yellow card) 53'; Lyng 85' (o.g.)	Stadium: Blue Water Arena; Attendance: 7,170; Referee: (Denmark) Michael Dannemann Pleidrup Johansen

1 August 2014 Match 3	Silkeborg IF	0-2	SønderjyskE	Silkeborg
18:30 CET	Flinta (yellow card) 72'; Sørensen (yellow card) 82'	Summary	Marxen (yellow card) 44'; Golubović 46'; Oggesen 86'	Stadium: Silkeborg Stadion; Attendance: 3,105; Referee: (Denmark) Mads-Kristoffer Kristoffersen

10 August 2014 Match 4	SønderjyskE	1-3	FC Midtjylland	Haderslev
14:00 CET	Jónasson (yellow card) 53'; Absalonsen 61'; Lodberg (yellow card) 90'	Summary	Andersson 43'; Banggaard (yellow card) 49' (goal) 76'; Igboun 54'	Stadium: Sydbank Park; Attendance: 4,119; Referee: (Denmark) Anders Poulsen

17 August 2014 Match 5	Brøndby	2-0	SønderjyskE	Brøndbyvester
17:00 CET	Holst (yellow card) 3'; Makienok 49' (yellow card) 55' (goal) 71'	Summary	Lodberg (yellow card) 25'; Jónasson (yellow card) 38'; Marxen (yellow card) 48'; Guira (yellow card) 65'	Stadium: Brøndby Stadium; Attendance: 9,962; Referee: (Denmark) Jens Maae

30 August 2014 Match 6	SønderjyskE	1-1	Randers FC	Haderslev
17:00 CET	Guira (yellow card) 12'; Silas Songani 28'	Summary	Fall 90'	Stadium: Sydbank Park; Attendance: 2,254; Referee: (Denmark) Dennis Mogensen

15 September 2014 Match 7	SønderjyskE	1-1	Hobro IK	Haderslev
19:00 CET	Bechmann 12'; Lodberg (yellow card) 50'; Madsen (yellow card) 68'	Summary	Damborg (yellow card) 30'; Hvilsom (yellow card) 33' (goal) 34'	Stadium: Sydbank Park; Attendance: 4,138; Referee: (Denmark) Benjamin Svendborg

21 September 2014 Match 8	OB	1-1	SønderjyskE	Odense
14:00 CET	Spelmann 14' (yellow card) 51'; Ruud (yellow card) 35'; Skúlason (yellow card) 48'	Summary	Madsen (yellow card) 69'; Guira 84'	Stadium: TRE-FOR Park; Attendance: 7,201; Referee: (Denmark) Peter Kjaersgaard-Andersen

27 September 2014 Match 9	SønderjyskE	1-1	Copenhagen	Haderslev
15:00 CET	Jensen (yellow card) 26'; Guira 50'; Oggesen (yellow card) 90'	Summary	Cornelius (yellow card) 56'; Kačaniklić 57'	Stadium: Sydbank Park; Attendance: 5,535; Referee: (Denmark) Peter Kjaersgaard-Andersen

5 October 2014 Match 10	FC Vestsjælland	1-1	SønderjyskE	Slagelse
13:00 CET	Hende (yellow card) 12'; Kristiansen (yellow card) 27'; Due 56'	Summary	Bechmann 34'	Stadium: Harboe Arena Slagelse; Attendance: 2,667; Referee: (Denmark) Mich ael Tykgaard

18 October 2014 Match 11	FC Nordsjælland	2-3	SønderjyskE	Farum
17:00 CET	Christiansen (yellow card) 28'; Lorentzen 42'; Runje (yellow card) 71' (goal) 90'	Summary	Bechmann 9' (yellow card) 29' (goal) 40'; Pourié (yellow card) 12'; Runje 59' (o.g.); Jónasson (yellow card) 90'	Stadium: Farum Park; Attendance: 6,463; Referee: (Denmark) Benjamin Svendborg
