= Mark Gundelach =

Danish footballer (born 1992)

Personal information
- Date of birth: 7 January 1992 (age 34)
- Place of birth: Stenløse, Denmark
- Position: Right-back

Youth career
- Nordsjælland

Senior career*
Years	Team	Apps	(Gls)
2008–2015	Nordsjælland	42	(1)
2013–2014	→ SønderjyskE (loan)	12	(0)
2015–2017	HB Køge	85	(5)
2017–2019	Roskilde	34	(1)
2019–2021	HB Køge	58	(0)
2021	KA	8	(0)
2022–2023	Fremad Amager	16	(0)

International career
2008–2009	Denmark U17	11	(2)
2009–2010	Denmark U18	10	(0)
2010–2011	Denmark U19	9	(1)
2011–2012	Denmark U20	5	(1)
2012–2013	Denmark U21	8	(0)
- * Club domestic league appearances and goals as of 16:02, 10 December 2022 (UTC)

Mark Gundelach (born 7 January 1992) is a Danish professional footballer who plays as a right-back.

== Club career ==
On 27 November 2011, Gundelach scored his first senior goal for Nordsjælland in a 2–1 win over Silkeborg.

On 22 June 2019, he joined HB Køge.

== International career ==
Gundelach was part of the Danish under-20 team that won the 2011 Milk Cup in Northern Ireland.

== Honours ==
Nordsjælland

- Danish Superliga: 2011–12

Denmark U20

- Milk Cup Elite: 2011
