= Lasse Petry =

Danish footballer (born 1992)

Personal information
- Full name: Lasse Petry Andersen
- Date of birth: 19 September 1992 (age 34)
- Place of birth: Smørumnedre, Denmark
- Height: 5 ft 6 in (1.68 m)
- Position: Midfielder

Youth career
- ?–2007: Ledøje-Smørum
- 2007–2011: Nordsjælland

Senior career*
Years	Team	Apps	(Gls)
2011–2018	Nordsjælland	93	(2)
2018	Lyngby	14	(1)
2019	Valur	29	(5)
2020–2022	HB Køge	18	(1)
2022	FH Hafnarfjördur	9	(0)
2022	Valur	11	(0)
Total		174	(9)

International career
2012	Denmark U20	2	(0)
2013	Denmark U21	1	(0)
- * Club domestic league appearances and goals

Lasse Petry Andersen (born 19 September 1992) is a Danish former professional footballer who played as midfielder.

== Career ==
Petry was born in Smørumnedre, and played football during his youth for his local club Ledøje-Smørum Fodbold, before moving on to FC Nordsjælland at under-15 level.

On 28 April 2011, Petry was brought on as a substitute in the Danish Cup semi-final win over Randers, his first appearance for the first team. He signed a new contract on 2 April 2012, extending his contract with Nordsjælland to June 2014. The following years, however, were plagued by injuries which meant that Petry never established himself in the starting lineup. Between 2014 and 2017, he only made 33 league appearances due to injuries, mainly a meniscus tear which kept him sidelined for an extended period of time.

In May 2018, Nordsjælland announced on their website that Petry would leave the club when his contract expired on 30 June. On 18 August 2018, Petry signed a six-month contract with Lyngby Boldklub. He made 14 appearances in which he scored one goal during his tenure at Lyngby.

On 7 January 2019, Petry moved to defending Icelandic champions Valur alongside fellow Dane Emil Lyng.

Petry returned to Denmark at the end of the season and signed with Danish 1st Division club HB Køge on 30 December 2020. He made his debut for the club on 13 February 2021 in a 1–1 draw against Hobro IK. In the game, he scored the equaliser for Køge in the 83rd minute, becoming the 12th player in club history to score in his debut.

In early May 2022, Petry terminated his contract with Køge and returned to Iceland, where he signed for FH Hafnarfjördur. With the dismissal of Ólafur Jóhannesson and his subsequent reinstatement as head coach of Valur, Petry found himself again playing for Valur. Due to persistent knee problems, 30-year-old Petry confirmed on 8 November 2022 that he would retire with immediate effect.

== Career statistics ==
=== Club ===
As of September 3, 2011

Club	Season	League		Cup		Continental		Other		Total	
Club	Season	Apps	Goals	Apps	Goals	Apps	Goals	Apps	Goals	Apps	Goals
Nordsjælland	2010–11	0	0	1	0	0	0	0	0	1	0
Nordsjælland	2011–12	0	0	1	0	0	0	0	0	1	0
Nordsjælland	Total	0	0	2	0	0	0	0	0	2	0
Career total		0	0	2	0	0	0	0	0	2	0
