= Conor O'Brien (soccer) =

American soccer player

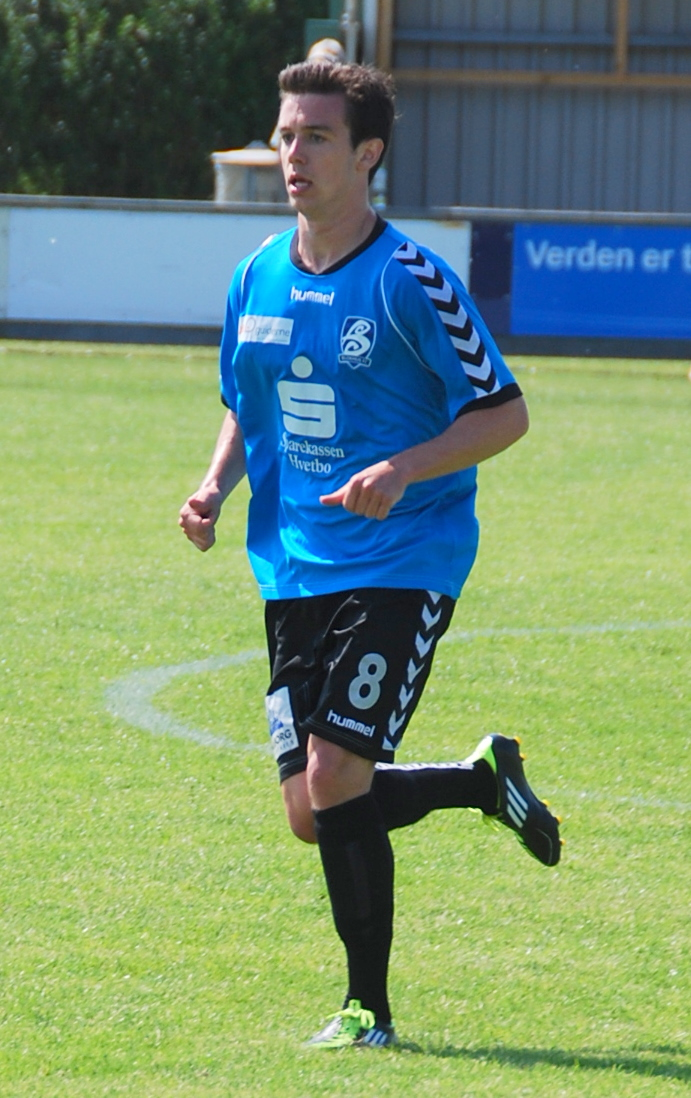
- Conor O'Brien, June 2011.

Personal information
- Full name: Conor Stephen O'Brien
- Date of birth: October 20, 1988 (age 38)
- Place of birth: Mount Sinai, New York, United States
- Height: 1.80 m (5 ft 11 in)
- Position: Defensive midfielder

Youth career
- 2006–2009: Bucknell Bison

Senior career*
Years	Team	Apps	(Gls)
2009	Cary Clarets	15	(2)
2010–2011	Blokhus FC	23	(9)
2011–2012	SønderjyskE	45	(7)
2013	Nordsjælland	14	(1)
2013–2014	OB	16	(0)
2014–2015	Wiener Neustadt	29	(4)
2015–2017	AC Horsens	55	(2)
2017	IK Start	9	(0)
2018	Charlotte Independence	7	(0)
- * Club domestic league appearances and goals as of 09:41, 15 October 2018 (UTC)

Conor Stephen O'Brien (born October 20, 1988) is an American soccer player.

== Youth career ==
Conor O'Brien won a State Cup as a Boys-Under-10 player with the Long Island Junior Soccer League's Terryville Fire in 1999. He was the only Fire player remaining the next time they won the State Cup—as an Under-18 side in 2007.

A Long Island native, O'Brien was one of the most decorated players at Bucknell University, finishing his career 2nd in school history in assists and 9th in goals. He also was named first-team all-Patriot League twice, winning the league's Offensive Player of the Year Award twice. He also became Bucknell's first All-American in 33 years and was named a finalist for the Hermann Trophy, given to the national player of the year. At Bucknell he started every game over four years and led the club to their first ever Patriot League title.

== Club career ==
After finishing his Bucknell career, O’Brien went undrafted in the 2010 MLS Superdraft despite rave reviews at the MLS Combine in 2010. Not wanting to give up on his professional ambitions, O’Brien joined Blokhus FC, a tiny club playing in the third division of Denmark. At Blokhus, the midfielder found immediate success. O'Brien found the net 10 times as the club stormed to the 2nd Division West title and then emerged victorious in the promotion

Following the 2010–11 season, he signed an eighteen-month contract with SønderjyskE in the Danish SuperLiga. In his first year, he scored 3 goals in 25 league appearances. After scoring 4 goals in 20 appearances during the first half of the 2012-13 Danish Superliga, O'Brien's contract expired, and he did not choose to resign with the club.

After his contract expired with SønderjyskE, O'Brien signed with reigning SuperLiga winners FC Nordsjælland. and participated in the team's 2012-2013 Champions League campaign. Following O'Brien's brief stay with the Wild Tigers he would head to Odense Boldklub. When struggling to maintain position in the league table, Odense BK seemed to prefer to play a product from the team's youth system rather than the American.

During his stay in Denmark's top flight, O'Brien logged 9 goals and 5 assists across all competitions for Odense BK, SönderjyskE and FC Nordsjælland, for whom he made his Champions League debut in 2013.

Conor O'Brien has the most goals in Denmark's SuperLiga as an American born player with 8 and is third in most games played with 79.

In the summer of 2014 O'Brien signed a one-year contract with Austrian Bundesliga side Wiener Neustadt, in which-given the opportunity to play-he returned to form, recording 29 appearances on the pitch with 4 goals in Austrian Bundesliga domestic matches. In addition to competing interest from the Danish Superliga, MLSsoccer.com has learned that O'Brien also had free agent contact from Major League Soccer.

Conor O'Brien has started his current season with AC Horsens in 2016 after recording 21 starts and 23 appearances with the squad in the 2015-16 SuperLiga season. He left the club in the summer 2017 and briefly went to IK Start in neighboring country Norway.

O'Brien had a short stint with USL side Charlotte Independence during their 2018 season.
