= Simon Richter =

Danish-born Gambian footballer (born 1985)

Personal information
- Date of birth: 16 January 1985 (age 41)
- Place of birth: Denmark
- Height: 1.77 m (5 ft 10 in)
- Position: Right back

Youth career
- Rosenhøj BK
- Brøndby IF

Senior career*
Years	Team	Apps	(Gls)
2005–2009	FC Nordsjælland	43	(1)
2010	AB	2	(0)
2010–2011	Fremad Amager	18	(0)
2011–2014	HB Køge	75	(2)
2014–2018	FC Roskilde	97	(5)
2018–2020	Brønshøj BK	17	(1)
2021–2022	Tårnby FF		
Total		287	(9)

International career
2017–2019	Gambia	8	(0)
- * Club domestic league appearances and goals

Simon Richter (born 16 January 1985) is a Danish-born Gambian former professional football defender. He also represented the Gambia national team.

== International career ==
Richter debuted for the Gambia national football team in a friendly 2-1 win over the Central African Republic on 27 March 2017.

== Personal life ==
He is the son of a Gambian father and a Danish mother and the twin brother of Jonathan Richter.
