= Poul Hansen (football manager) =

Danish football manager (born 1953)

Personal information
- Date of birth: 4 December 1953 (age 72)
- Place of birth: Sønderborg, Denmark

Managerial career
- Years: Team
- 1983–1986: Ulkebøl FK
- 1986–1988: Aabenraa BK
- 1989–1996: Haderslev FK
- 1996–1998: Ikast fS
- 1998–2001: Lyngby FC
- 2001–2002: Farum BK (director of sports)
- 2002–2003: AGF
- 2009–2011: AB (assistant)
- 2011–2012: OB (director of sports)
- 2012: OB (caretaker)

Poul Hansen (born 4 December 1953) is a Danish football manager and former director of sports at OB. He was awarded Danish Football Manager of the Year in 1999.

He has been the manager of Haderslev FK, Ikast fS, Lyngby FC, and AGF Aarhus. From 2002 to 2003 he was director of sports of Farum BK.

He has since 2008 been expert commentator at TV2 Sport.
