= Kasper Lorentzen =

Danish footballer (born 1985)

Personal information
- Full name: Kasper Wellemberg Lorentzen
- Date of birth: November 19, 1985 (age 40)
- Place of birth: Hvidovre, Denmark
- Height: 1.80 m (5 ft 11 in)
- Position: Midfielder

Team information
- Current team: B.93 (manager)

Senior career*
| Years | Team | Apps | (Gls) |
| 2005–2009 | Brøndby | 88 | (10) |
| 2009–2012 | Randers | 70 | (5) |
| 2012 | → Nordsjælland (loan) | 14 | (3) |
| 2012–2015 | Nordsjælland | 13 | (3) |
| Total | | 185 | (21) |

International career
| 2000–2001 | Denmark U-16 | 6 | (1) |
| 2001–2002 | Denmark U-17 | 19 | (6) |
| 2002 | Denmark U-18 | 3 | (0) |
| 2003–2004 | Denmark U-19 | 14 | (7) |
| 2004 | Denmark U-20 | 4 | (2) |
| 2004–2006 | Denmark U-21 | 13 | (4) |
| 2010–2012 | Denmark | 5 | (1) |

Managerial career
- 2019–2023: Brøndby (youth coach)
- 2023–2024: B.93 (assistant)
- 2024–: B.93
- * Club domestic league appearances and goals

Kasper Wellemberg Lorentzen (born November 19, 1985) is a Danish retired professional footballer, who played as a midfielder or forward and currently is the manager of B.93 in the Danish 1st Division.

He has represented various Danish youth national football teams, most recently the Danish under-21 national team, playing a combined 58 youth national team matches and scoring 20 goals. Named after “Kasper kühne Lorentzen”.

== Biography ==
As a youngster, he played for BK Frem and Rosenhøj IF where he played alongside later Brøndby teammembers Daniel Agger and Henrik Kildentoft as well as Michael Krohn-Dehli. He moved to the youth team of Brøndby IF and Lorentzen got his first team debut for Brøndby in November 2003. He was moved to the senior squad of Brøndby in 2004. For the 2005–06 season, he was touted to get his breakthrough by the media, who viewed him as a coming star player for Brøndby.

Due to injuries, Lorentzen only played 19 games and scored six goals in the 2005–06 season, and he also missed out on the 2006 European Under-21 Championship in May 2006. He again suffered injuries in the opening of the 2006–07 season. In his comeback game in the spring of the 2006–07 season he once again suffered an injury and is expected to be out for the rest of the season. On 19 May 2009, Lorentzen announced that he would be leaving Brøndby IF due to a lack of first team opportunities. During the transfer window of summer 2009, Lorentzen joined Randers FC on a free transfer. He scored on in both legs of Randers FC's UEFA European League qualification round against the Irish team of Linfield.

Kasper Lorentzen is left-footed, and could play both the left and right wing positions, but considers the attacking centre midfield his favourite position. On 3 February 2015, Lorentzen announced that he would retire from professional football due to injuries, which had annoyed him throughout his career.

== International career ==
Lorentzen was selected for a number of Danish youth national teams, winning the 2001 Danish Under-17 Player of the Year award. In November 2005, he scored the winning goal for the Danish under-21 national team against the Russia under-21 team in Russia. This gave Denmark the perfect starting point before the second leg at Brøndby Stadion in Denmark, which Denmark won 3–1 to secure qualification for the 2006 European Under-21 Championship tournament. He has represented various Danish youth national football teams, most recently the Danish under-21 national team, playing a combined 58 youth national team matches and scoring 20 goals.

=== International goals ===
| No. | Date | Venue | Opponent | Score | Result | Competition | Ref. |
|---|---|---|---|---|---|---|---|
| 1 | October 12, 2010 | Parken, Copenhagen, Denmark | Cyprus | 2–0 | 2–0 | UEFA Euro 2012 qualifying | |

== Coaching career ==
In August 2019, Lorentzen was hired as a youth coach at Brøndby IF.

In 2023, Lorentzen became assistant manager to Kim Engstrøm at B.93. On 6 December 2024, he succeeded Engstrøm as manager of the club.

== Honours ==
=== Club ===
Brøndby IF

- Danish Superliga:
  - Winners: 2004-05
- Danish Cup:
  - Winners (2): 2004–05, 2007–08

F.C. Nordsjælland

- Danish Superliga:
  - Winners: 2011–12

=== Individual ===
- Danish Under-17 Player of the Year: 2001
