= Kristian Lindberg =

Danish footballer (born 1994)

Personal information
- Full name: Kristian Ladewig Lindberg
- Date of birth: 14 February 1994 (age 32)
- Place of birth: Hvidovre, Denmark
- Height: 1.84 m (6 ft 0 in)
- Position: Left winger

Youth career
- –2008: Hvidovre
- 2008–2012: Nordsjælland

Senior career*
Years	Team	Apps	(Gls)
2012–2015	Nordsjælland	38	(3)
2014–2015	→ Lyngby (loan)	12	(1)
2015–2016	Atlético Baleares	9	(0)
2016–2018	Roskilde	37	(5)
2018–2019	Lyngby	21	(3)
2019	Roskilde	7	(2)
2020–2022	Nykøbing	42	(5)
2022	ÍA	11	(2)
2023	Ishøj	13	(5)
2023	Frem		

International career
2009–2010	Denmark U16	5	(2)
2011–2012	Denmark U17	13	(2)
2011–2012	Denmark U18	7	(0)
2012–2013	Denmark U19	14	(6)
2013	Denmark U20	2	(0)
2015	Denmark U21	1	(0)
- * Club domestic league appearances and goals as of 15:50, 14 September 2023

Kristian Ladewig Lindberg (born 14 February 1994) is a Danish professional footballer who plays as a left winger.

== Club career ==
=== Nordsjælland ===
Lindberg joined Nordsjælland as a 14-year-old from Hvidovre IF. He made his professional debut on 31 October 2012 in a Danish Cup game against Midtjylland, where he also scored his first goal.

On 1 September 2014, he was sent on a one-season loan to Lyngby.

=== Atlético Baleares ===
In August 2015, Lindberg signed a two-year contract with Segunda División B club Atlético Baleares.

He would, however, mostly feature as a substitute for the Spanish club which Lindberg owed the team's tactics rather than his own playing style, and he made nine league appearances.

=== Roskilde ===
In September 2016, Lindberg signed with FC Roskilde on a one-year deal. He obtained his playing licence in October. He made his debut on 30 October as a starter in a 2–0 defeat against FC Fredericia.

In January 2017, he extended his contract with Roskilde until December 2018. On 5 March 2017, he scored his first goal for the club in a 4–0 away victory against AB.

=== Lyngby ===
On 3 July 2018, it was announced that Lindberg had signed a one-year contract with Lyngby, marking his return to the club.

After leaving Lyngby Boldklub in June 2019, Lindberg returned to FC Roskilde in mid-September on a short deal for the rest of 2019. However, it was confirmed on 10 January 2020, that he had left Roskilde again.

=== Nykøbing ===
On 6 September 2020, he joined Nykøbing FC after a successful trial. He made his debut for the club on 6 September in a 1–0 victory against Avarta in the third-tier 2nd Division. His first goal for the club came on 20 November, which proved to be the winner in a 2–1 win over HIK. On 8 January 2021, he extended his contract with Nykøbing until 2022. At the end of the season, Nykøbing achieved promotion back to the second tier by winning the title.

On 4 August 2021, Lindberg scored a hat-trick in the first round of the Danish Cup as Nykøbing knocked out B1908 Amager with a 4–1 final score. In the third round of the cup, Lindberg was an unused substitute as his club shockingly knocked out FC Copenhagen in a 3–0 win. On 25 May 2022, Nykøbing announced the departure of Lindberg, as his contract had come to an end.

=== ÍA ===
On 28 June 2022, Lindberg joined Icelandic club ÍA. He made his debut for ÍA on 4 July, coming on as a half-time substitute for Oliver Stefánsson in a 1–0 league loss to Leiknir Reykjavík. On 8 August, he scored his first goal for the club in a 2–1 loss to Valur, heading in a cross from Gísli Laxdal Unnarsson.

Lindberg left ÍA at the end of the year, as they suffered relegation to the 1. deild karla. He finished his six-month stint with the club with two goals in 11 appearances.

=== Ishøj ===
On 31 January 2023, Lindberg confirmed, that he had joined Danish 3rd Division club Ishøj IF. He made his debut for the club on 18 March, replacing Daniel Stückler in the 63rd minute of a 2–0 league victory against AB Tårnby. Three days later, he scored his first goal for Ishøj in a 1–1 home draw against Næsby, and he scored his first brace nine days later, on 1 April, helping his side to a convincing 6–0 win over Dalum.

=== Frem ===
On 18 August 2023, it was confirmed that he had joined Danish 3rd Division club BK Frem. He left the club at the end of the year.

== International career ==
Lindberg has represented Denmark at youth international level.

== Honours ==
Atlético Baleares

- Copa Federación de España: 2015–16
