= Patrick Mtiliga =

Danish footballer (born 1981)

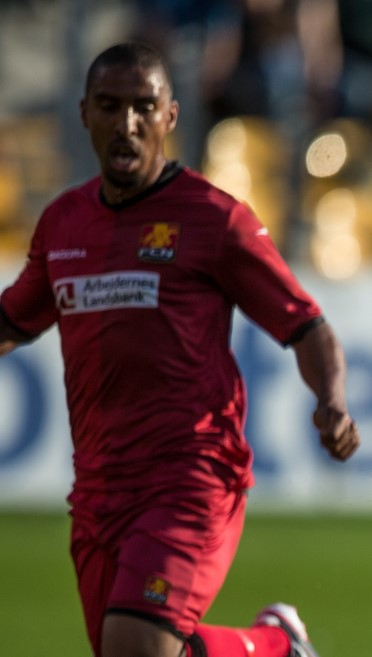
- Mtiliga with Nordsjælland in 2013

Personal information
- Full name: Patrick Jan Mtiliga
- Date of birth: 28 January 1981 (age 45)
- Place of birth: Copenhagen, Denmark
- Height: 1.71 m (5 ft 7 in)
- Position: Left-back

Team information
- Current team: B.93 (sporting director)

Youth career
- B.93

Senior career*
Years	Team	Apps	(Gls)
1998–1999	B.93	13	(0)
1999–2006	Feyenoord	22	(0)
1999–2004	→ Excelsior (loan)	139	(28)
2006–2009	NAC Breda	80	(2)
2009–2011	Málaga	43	(0)
2011–2017	Nordsjælland	150	(5)
Total		447	(35)

International career
1997–1998	Denmark U17	20	(0)
1998–2001	Denmark U19	8	(3)
2000–2002	Denmark U21	9	(1)
2008–2012	Denmark	6	(0)
- * Club domestic league appearances and goals

Patrick Jan Mtiliga (Danish pronunciation: [ɛmtsʰiˈlikæ]; born 28 January 1981) is a Danish retired professional footballer and currently the Assistant Academy Director of FC Nordsjælland. He played as a defender, most frequently used as a left-back. He played six games for the Denmark national team.

== Club career ==
Patrick Mtiliga was born in Copenhagen to a Tanzanian father. He started playing youth football for Copenhagen club Boldklubben 1893 (B 93). He initially played as a striker or attacking midfielder. He made his senior debut for B 93 in the 1998–99 Danish Superliga season. After 13 league games for the club, he moved abroad to join Dutch club Feyenoord Rotterdam in the Eredivisie championship in the summer 1999.

=== Dutch years ===
He was initially loaned out from Feyenoord to feeder club Excelsior Rotterdam in the lower league Eerste Divisie, for an indefinite period of time. He established himself in the Excelsior first team squad during his first year at the club. He went on to play 4 1/2 seasons for Excelsior, helping the club win promotion for the Eredivisie in the 2001–02 season, though they were relegated again in the very next season. In the 2003–04 season, he secured himself a place in the Excelsior starting line-up, where he played 23 games. Halfway through the 2003–04 season, he was finally called into the Feyenoord squad. He finished the season playing 11 games in the Eredivisie for the club. The following year, his Feyenoord career came to a halt. He played 11 league games in his first full season for Feyenoord, as he incurred a serious hip injury in January 2005. As he recovered by January 2006, Feyenoord looked to loan him out again, while Mtiliga opted to spend the remainder of the season with the reserve team.

In August 2006, Mtiliga moved on to Eredivise rivals NAC Breda, signing a one-year contract, with an option for extension. After a success-filled period at NAC, he extended his contract by two-and-a-half years in January 2007. He played 30 of 34 games, as NAC was the surprise of the year and finished third in the 2007–08 Eredivisie. He established himself as one of the best left-backs in the Eredivisie, and was included in team of the week on several occasions. When his contract expired in the summer 2009, he was approached by a number of clubs.

=== Málaga ===
He signed a contract with Málaga CF in the Spanish La Liga championship in the summer 2009. He was injured in his first league game for the club, and had a hard time forcing his way back into the starting line-up. He was asked to take a more attacking approach by manager Juan Ramón López Muñiz, and soon reasserted himself in the first team. In a 24 January 2010 away match against Real Madrid, Cristiano Ronaldo broke Mtiliga's nose by hitting him in the face with his elbow. Ronaldo was shown a red card and it was reported that Mtiliga would be out of the game for three weeks. On 30 June 2011, his contract with the Andalusians expired and he left the club.

=== Nordsjælland ===
On 4 August 2011, it was confirmed that he would be returning to Denmark after 13 years abroad, as he signed a two-year contract with Danish club FC Nordsjælland that plays in the Danish top-division Danish Superliga. He made his league debut for FCN on 11 September 2011, in a 2–1 win over AaB.

Mtiliga announced his retirement from football on 28 August 2017, and played his final professional match on 10 December in a 3–2, coming off as a 90th-minute substitute for Andreas Skovgaard in a 3–2 home win over Hobro IK.

== International career ==
Mtiliga made his first appearance for Denmark at under-17 level in August 1997. Across Denmark's youth categories he earned 37 caps and scored four goals, including nine matches and one goal for the under-21 team.

During his early years at Feyenoord, manager Ruud Gullit identified Mtiliga as a potential future senior international. Despite consistent form for NAC Breda, he later expressed frustration at being overlooked for selection during the spring of 2008.

In November 2008 he received his first call-up to the senior national team from head coach Morten Olsen and made his debut in a friendly against Wales. He was not selected again immediately afterwards, something he later addressed publicly.

In May 2010, Mtiliga was included in Olsen's provisional squad for the 2010 FIFA World Cup. His selection was regarded as a surprise in some quarters, though Olsen stated that Mtiliga's move to Málaga had strengthened his competitiveness at international level. On 28 May he was named in the final 23-man squad for the tournament.

Although considered in competition with fellow left-back Simon Busk Poulsen, both were ultimately selected for the finals. Mtiliga did not feature in any of Denmark's matches during the tournament, as the team were eliminated in the group stage.

On 6 December 2011, he was again called up by Denmark, this time for the national team's January 2012 tour of Thailand.

== Post-playing career ==
A half year after retiring at the end of 2017, Mtiliga was appointed as the sporting director of his former club B.93.

== Honours ==
FC Nordsjælland

- Danish Superliga: 2011–12
