= Ivan Runje =

Croatian footballer

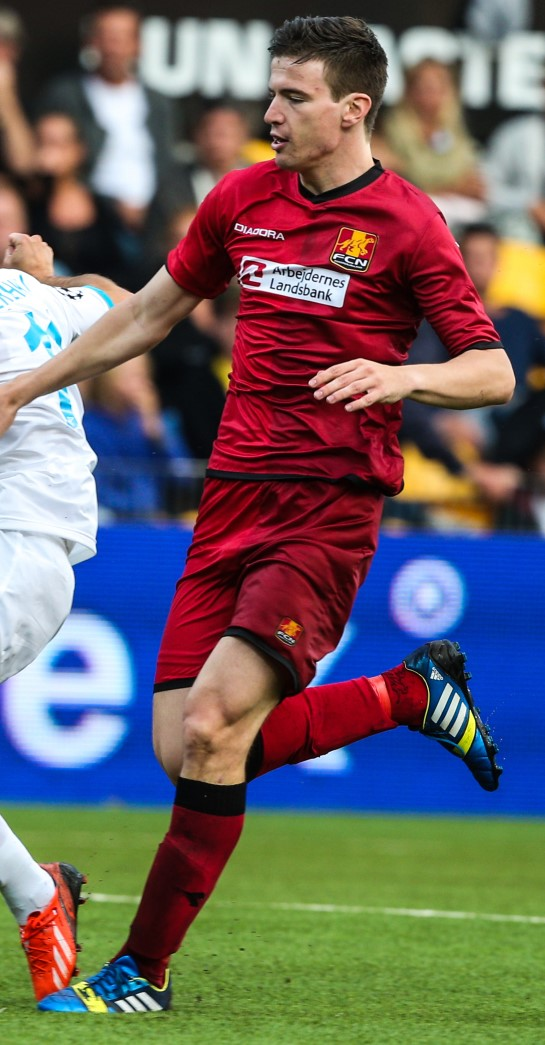

Personal information
- Date of birth: 9 October 1990 (age 36)
- Place of birth: Split, Croatia
- Height: 1.92 m (6 ft 3 1/2 in)
- Position: Centre-back

Youth career
- 2000–2007: Hajduk Split
- 2007–2008: Mosor Žrnovnica

Senior career*
Years	Team	Apps	(Gls)
2008–2011	Mosor Žrnovnica	56	(4)
2012–2016	Nordsjælland	73	(2)
2015–2016	→ Omonia (loan)	26	(1)
2016	Omonia	17	(1)
2016–2023	Jagiellonia	138	(9)
2020–2022	Jagiellonia II	3	(0)
Total		313	(17)

International career
2013	Croatia U21	1	(0)
- * Club domestic league appearances and goals

Ivan Runje (born 9 October 1990) is a Croatian former professional footballer who played as a centre-back.

== Club career ==
Runje started his career with Mosor Žrnovnica.

== International career ==
He played one game for the Croatia national under-21 football team, in 2013.

== Honours ==
Nordsjælland

- Danish Superliga: 2011–12
