= Michael Ribers =

Danish footballer (born 1981)

Personal information
- Full name: Michael Allan Ribers
- Date of birth: 19 May 1981 (age 45)
- Place of birth: Denmark
- Height: 1.80 m (5 ft 11 in)
- Position: Defender

Youth career
- Lillerød
- Brøndby IF

Senior career*
Years	Team	Apps	(Gls)
1999–2001	Brøndby IF	3	(0)
2001–2002	Herfølge BK		
2002–2005	BK Skjold		
2005–2008	FC Nordsjælland	82	(6)
- * Club domestic league appearances and goals as of 24 May 2008

Michael Allan Ribers (born 19 May 1981) is a Danish professional football defender.

Ribers was called up for the league national team, which played a number of unofficial national team games in the United States, El Salvador and Honduras in January 2007, by national team manager Morten Olsen. He played the first game of the tour; a 3–1 defeat to the United States national team in Los Angeles, California.
