= Jonathan Richter =

Danish footballer (born 1985)

Personal information
- Date of birth: 16 January 1985 (age 41)
- Place of birth: Denmark
- Height: 1.78 m (5 ft 10 in)
- Position: Midfielder

Youth career
- Rosenhøj BK
- BK Frem
- Brøndby IF

Senior career*
Years	Team	Apps	(Gls)
2005–2009	FC Nordsjælland	70	(9)
- * Club domestic league appearances and goals

Jonathan Richter (born 16 January 1985) is a Danish disabled professional football midfielder, who played for the Danish Superliga side FC Nordsjælland. He is the son of a Gambian father and a Danish mother and the twin brother of Simon Richter.

On 20 July 2009 while playing at Hvidovre Stadion, Richter was struck by lightning which resulted in cardiac arrest. He was put into a medically induced coma.

Medical staff at Hvidovre Hospital had hoped to be able to wake Richter from the coma soon after the accident but Richter's recovery was slower than hoped. This resulted in the doctors pushing back to bring Richter out of the coma twice.

Around August 1, Richter was taken out of the coma and on August 2, when doctors removed the last parts of the respirator equipment, Richter started to speak almost immediately. When club owner Allan K. Pedersen called Hvidovre Hospital to check on Richter, Richter himself told doctors to tell Pedersen that everything was good.

In late August 2009, Richter and his medical advisors decided to amputate Richter's lower left leg. This has, according to medical sources, dramatically improved Richter's general well-being.

FC Nordsjælland retired Richter's number 26 after his forced retirement from football at the age of 24.

Richter serves on the board of Danish team FC Græsrødderne, who compete in the fourth tier of the Danish football.
