= Søren Christensen =

Danish footballer

Personal information
- Full name: Søren Ejlersgård Christensen
- Date of birth: 29 June 1986 (age 40)
- Place of birth: Døllefjelde, Denmark
- Height: 1.74 m (5 ft 9 in)
- Position: Midfielder

Senior career*
Years	Team	Apps	(Gls)
2002–2006	NFA		(0)
2006–2014	Nordsjælland	203	(20)
2015	Haugesund	28	(0)
2016–2017	Slaven Belupo	42	(0)
2017–2021	Nykøbing	88	(7)

International career
2001	Denmark U16	2	(0)
2002–2003	Denmark U17	15	(0)
2003	Denmark U18	3	(0)
2003–2005	Denmark U19	14	(3)
2006	Denmark U20	1	(0)
2007–2008	Denmark U21	15	(2)
- * Club domestic league appearances and goals

Søren Ejlersgård Christensen (born 29 June 1986) is a Danish retired professional footballer.

Christensen has amassed a total 50 youth caps for Denmark under six different age groups. He retired from football in June 2021.

== International career ==
6 December 2011, Christensen was called up for Denmark's tour of Thailand in January.

== Honours ==
=== Club ===
- Danish Superliga:
  - Winners: 2011–12
- Danish Cup:
  - Winners (2): 2009–10, 2010–11
