= Mikkel Beckmann =

Danish footballer (born 1983)

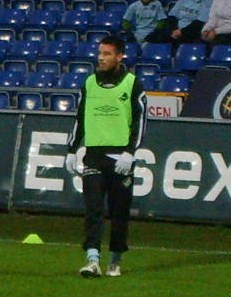

Personal information
- Full name: Mikkel Beckmann
- Date of birth: 24 October 1983 (age 43)
- Place of birth: Virum, Denmark
- Height: 1.83 m (6 ft 0 in)
- Position: Forward

Youth career
- Brede
- Virum-Sorgenfri
- B 1903
- Brønshøj

Senior career*
Years	Team	Apps	(Gls)
2004–2008	Lyngby	101	(20)
2008–2011	Randers FC	60	(15)
2011–2013	Nordsjælland	38	(12)
2013	APOEL	12	(2)
2013–2014	IF Elfsborg	29	(3)
2015–2016	Hobro	9	(0)
Total		249	(84)

International career
2008–2011	Denmark	7	(0)

Managerial career
- 2019–2025: Lyngby (assistant)
- 2024: Lyngby (interim)
- * Club domestic league appearances and goals

Mikkel Beckmann (born 24 October 1983) is a Danish retired professional footballer who played as a forward. He is currently a pundit with Viaplay covering the Danish 3F Superliga.

Beckmann began his career with Lyngby in 2004, eventually transferring to Randers FC, FC Nordsjælland, APOEL F.C, IF Elfsborg, and finally Hobro IK. He retired from professional football in 2015, and was an assistant coach of Lyngby BK from 2019 to 2025.

== Club career ==
Beckmann started his professional career when he signed with Lyngby BK in 2004. The high point of his time in Lyngby was the promotion into the Danish Superliga in the 2007–08 season. As one of Lyngby's hot prospects he and Kim Aabech, another highly touted player, are often referred to as "Aabeckman" by Lyngby fans. Despite Beckmanns personal success he was unable to stop Lyngby from being relegated to the Danish 1st Division in 2008. Beckmann played 105 matches for the club and scored 20 goals until the summer 2008. He was particularly renowned at Lyngby for his ability to handle icy playing conditions, often being brought on as a substitute immediately following a break in play due to heavy snow.

=== Randers FC ===
On 31 August 2008, Beckmann signed a four-year-long contract with Danish club Randers FC. Beckmann got his debut against AC Horsens on 14 September, the game ended 1–1. However, Beckmann found himself sidelined after suffering from a knee injury which kept him out for the following five matches. He made his return against AC Horsens on 16 November coming on as a sub in the second half. When the winter break arrived Beckmann had created three assist in five matches. Beckmann spoke of his desire to show his full potential after the winter break after having his match appearances reduced by an injury.

In his second season at the club, Beckmann established himself in the starting line-up. Randers were in shared last place at the winter break, 13 points below the relegation line, but in the spring season 2010, Beckmann scored seven goals in 15 games, as Randers made a sensational comeback and stayed in the Superliga.

He is the only Randers FC player to have represented Denmark at a World Cup.

=== FC Nordsjælland ===
The following 2010–11 season, Randers were relegated to the 1st Division, which resulted in Beckmann being sold to Danish Cup winners FC Nordsjælland for a reported fee of 1,000,000 Danish kroner, where Beckmann signed a three contract with the Farum club and was given the number 10 shirt. The next season, he helped FC Nordsjælland to win the 2011–12 Danish Superliga and reach the group stages of the 2012–13 UEFA Champions League, scoring a goal in FC Nordsjælland's 1–1 home draw against Juventus F.C.

=== APOEL ===
On 8 January 2013, Beckmann joined the Cypriot side APOEL F.C. on a 2 1/2-year contract, after he completed his transfer from FC Nordsjælland for a reported fee of €200,000. He scored his first goal with APOEL on 3 March 2013, in a league match against AEK Larnaca, netting the game's only goal with long-range effort in the 75th minute. At the end of the season, APOEL won the 2012–13 Cypriot First Division and Beckmann became a champion for a second consecutive season. Unexpectedly, and although he still had a two-year contract with APOEL, on 11 July 2013 his contract with the club was mutually terminated.

=== IF Elfsborg ===
On 8 August 2013, it was announced that Beckmann joined IF Elfsborg on a 3.5-year contract as a free-agent, after he mutually terminated his contract with APOEL. He shortly arrived to Elfsborg replacing the former striker David Elm who signed for Kalmar FF, taking over his shirt-number 10.

== International career ==
While at Lyngby, Beckmann was called up for the Denmark U21 national team in August 2004, but did not get to play.

Having helped Lyngby to the Superliga, Beckmann was called up as a replacement by Denmark national team manager Morten Olsen for a series of unofficial games in January 2008. He made an impression, and Olsen included him in the squad later that month, in order to further test Beckmann's international level. He made his debut in a February 2008 friendly match 2–1 win against Slovenia, and also played in the subsequent friendly against the Czech Republic, a 1–1 draw. He was a part of the Danish squad until June 2008, but did not play any further games.

In May 2010, he was included in Olsen's preliminary 30-man selection for the 2010 FIFA World Cup, and was subsequently chosen for the final 23-player squad. Olsen had been impressed with his form for Randers in the spring season 2010, while the inclusion came as a surprise to Beckmann himself. 6 December 2011, Beckmann was called up for Denmark's tour of Thailand in January.

== Coaching career ==
On 22 November 2015, Beckmann announced on live TV, that he would retire from professional football, because he had too much pain due to several injuries. On 9 January 2019, Beckmann was announced as the new assistant coach of Lyngby BK.

On 1 March 2024, after just 50 days as head coach, Magne Hoseth was fired and Beckmann took over the position on an interim basis. He continued in his role as assistant coach after David Nielsen was appointed two days later. On 28 May 2025 Lyngby confirmed, that Beckmann would leave the club.

== Honours ==
FC Nordsjælland

- Danish Superliga: 2011–12

APOEL

- Cypriot First Division: 2012–13
