= Nicolai Stokholm =

Danish footballer (born 1976)

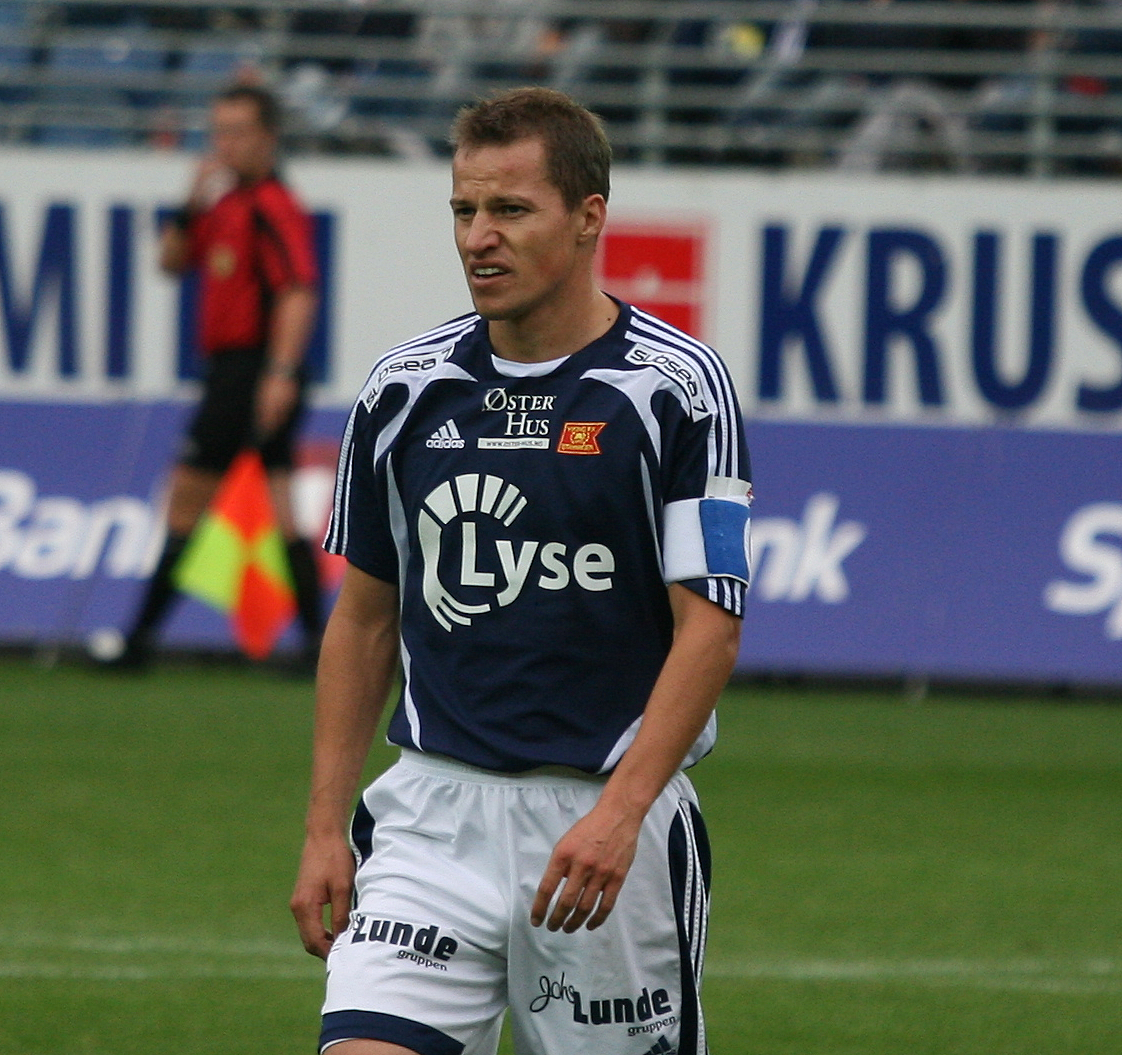

Personal information
- Date of birth: 1 April 1976 (age 50)
- Place of birth: Regstrup, Denmark
- Height: 1.82 m (6 ft 0 in)
- Position: Midfielder

Senior career*
| Years | Team | Apps | (Gls) |
| 1996–1998 | Holbæk B&IF | 28 | (10) |
| 1998–2003 | Akademisk Boldklub | 137 | (14) |
| 2003–2006 | Odense BK | 87 | (10) |
| 2006–2008 | Viking | 62 | (12) |
| 2009–2014 | FC Nordsjælland | 102 | (15) |
| Total | | 416 | (61) |

International career
| 2006–2013 | Denmark | 8 | (0) |
- * Club domestic league appearances and goals

Nicolai Stokholm (born 1 April 1976) is a Danish former professional association footballer, who played as a midfielder. He played for FC Nordsjælland, having moved from Viking FK in the winter 2008–09. He made his debut for the Denmark national team in the March 2006 1–0 friendly win against Israel.

== Honours ==
F.C. Nordsjælland

- Danish Superliga: 2011–12
- Danish Cup: 2009–10, 2010–11

Individual

- Danish Superliga Player of the Year: 2011–12
