= Sune Kiilerich =

Danish footballer (born 1990)

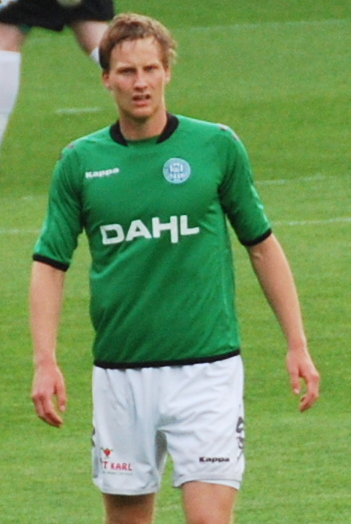

Personal information
- Full name: Sune Aagaard Kiilerich
- Date of birth: 18 December 1990 (age 35)
- Place of birth: Ikast, Denmark
- Height: 1.93 m (6 ft 4 in)
- Position: Defender

Team information
- Current team: Arendal
- Number: 13

Youth career
- 2004–2008: FC Midtjylland
- 2010–2011: Sampdoria

Senior career*
Years	Team	Apps	(Gls)
2009–2011	Sampdoria	0	(0)
2010–2011	→ Viborg FF (loan)	18	(0)
2011–2015	Silkeborg IF	55	(1)
2015–2017	FC Fredericia	29	(0)
2017–	Arendal	113	(4)

International career
2008	Denmark U-18	2	(0)
2009	Denmark U-19	1	(0)
- * Club domestic league appearances and goals as of 1 December 2023

Sune Kiilerich (born 18 December 1990) is a Danish footballer who plays as a defender for Arendal.

== Career ==
Kiilerich began his career 2004 in the youth from FC Midtjylland and joined Ikast FS in summer 2009. On 29 January 2010, Sampdoria signed the Danish central defender from FC Midtjylland. The youngster initially became a member of Sampdoria's primavera squad.

== International career ==
Kiilerich played for Denmark national under-20 football team and was formerly a member of the U-18 and U-19.
