= Henrik Kildentoft =

Danish footballer (born 1985)

Personal information
- Full name: Henrik Kildentoft
- Date of birth: 18 March 1985 (age 41)
- Place of birth: Hvidovre, Denmark
- Height: 1.80 m (5 ft 11 in)
- Position: Right back

Youth career
- SBK 75
- BK Frem
- Rosenhøj
- –2004: Brøndby IF

Senior career*
Years	Team	Apps	(Gls)
2004–2007	Brøndby IF	37	(1)
2007–2013	FC Nordsjælland	122	(9)
2013–2014	FK Haugesund	20	(1)
2014–2015	Hønefoss BK	25	(1)
2015	Vendsyssel FF	10	(0)
2015–2017	Næstved BK	40	(1)

International career
2001–2002	Denmark U17	16	(0)
2002–2004	Denmark U19	16	(0)
2004	Denmark U20	5	(0)
2004–2006	Denmark U21	10	(0)
- * Club domestic league appearances and goals

Henrik Kildentoft (born 18 March 1985) is a Danish former professional footballer who played as a right back. He amassed a total 47 youth caps for Denmark under four different age groups.

== Early life ==
Henrik Kildentoft was born in Hvidovre, Denmark. He began playing football at the young age of 3 and went on to play in the youth teams for SBK 75, Frem and Rosenhøj, before moving on to Brøndby.

== Club career ==
=== Brøndby IF ===
Kildentoft started his professional career at Brøndby, signing his first contract in October 2003, keeping him at the club till the summer of 2005. He was given his senior debut in the Superliga by then head coach Michael Laudrup, in a match against Viborg on 16 April 2005, which Brøndby won 2–0. Making a total of four appearances in his first season during the 2004–05 campaign, where Brøndby won the league, but failed to make enough appearances to qualify for a winner's medal.

=== F.C. Nordsjælland ===
On 4 July 2007, Kildentoft joined Farum-based club F.C. Nordsjælland for a fee of 500,000 Danish kroner, signing a three-year contract, filling a large gap in the defense left by the departure of Heath Pearce. He made his debut on 18 July, in a surprising 1–0 win over F.C. Copenhagen and scored his first goal in his following match, in a 2–2 draw against his former club Brøndby. Kildentoft went on to miss a dozen games after starting well for his new club, after injuring his knee from a bad tackle in a match against F.C. Midtjylland. He went on to make 21 appearances and score three goals in his first season with FCN.

Kildentoft was club captain in the 2008–09 season, FC Nordsjaelland had qualified for a UEFA Cup run against TVMK Tallinn, Scottish club Queen of the South from Dumfries and Greek side Olympiacos.

=== FK Haugesund ===
Kildentoft signed for Norwegian club FK Haugesund on a three-year contract in January 2013, and played 17 matches for his new club in the debut season. He scored his only goal for the club in the 2–1 defeat against Tromsø on 28 April 2013. In 2014, he was loaned out to 1. divisjon club Hønefoss BK for the first half of the season. After his return to Haugesund, he sat on the bench for one Tippeliga match before he was released from the club.

=== Hønefoss BK ===
Kildentoft signed for Hønefoss on free transfer on 1 August 2014, in effect making his loan spell permanent. He scored his first goal for the club on 14 September 2014, in the 4–1 win against HamKam.

== International career ==
On 9 May 2006, Kildentoft was selected for the Denmark U21 national team squad for UEFA U-21 Championship 2006 in Portugal.

== Personal life ==
During his playing career, Kildentoft stated that his favourite football player was defender Alessandro Nesta and that he was a fan of Milan, expressing a desire to play for the club one day.

== Honours ==
Brøndby IF

- Royal League: 2006–07

F.C. Nordsjælland

- Danish Superliga: 2011–12
- Danish Cup: 2009–10, 2010–11
