= Niels Lodberg =

Danish footballer (born 1980)

Personal information
- Full name: Niels Lodberg Pedersen
- Date of birth: 14 October 1980 (age 46)
- Place of birth: Hvide Sande, Denmark
- Height: 1.89 m (6 ft 2 in)
- Position: Centre-back

Youth career
- BK Klitten

Senior career*
Years	Team	Apps	(Gls)
1998–2000	Ringkøbing		
2000–2002	Lyngby	19	(2)
2002–2004	Nordsjælland	34	(0)
2004–2012	Horsens	242	(53)
2012–2015	SønderjyskE	73	(4)
2015	Horsens	7	(0)

Managerial career
- 2015–2017: Horsens (assistant)
- 2017–2021: SønderjyskE (assistant)
- 2021–2022: SønderjyskE (assistant)
- 2023–2024: Midtjylland (assistant)
- * Club domestic league appearances and goals

Niels Lodberg (born 14 October 1980) is a Danish former professional football player.

Lodberg played as a centre-back and his height made him a formidable presence in aerial plays. He spent the entirety of his career in Denmark, playing for Lyngby Boldklub, FC Nordsjælland, AC Horsens and SønderjyskE.

== Career ==
Lodberg started his senior playing career with amateur club Ringkøbing IF from 1998 to 2000. In 2000, he moved to play as an amateur for Lyngby BK. He made his debut in the top-flight Danish Superliga in April 2001, before signing his first professional contract with Lyngby BK in May 2001. Having scored two goals in 19 Superliga games for Lyngby BK, Lodberg moved to Danish 1st Division team Farum BK in January 2002. He helped Farum BK win promotion for the 2002-03 Superliga season. He played 29 Superliga games for Farum, which got renamed to FC Nordsjælland in 2003, before moving to 1st Division team AC Horsens in 2004.

He scored 21 goals for Horsens in the 2004-05 1st Division season, helping AC Horsens win promotion for the Superliga. Lodberg scored four goals in AC Horsens' first two seasons in the Superliga. On 18 July 2007, Lodberg scored his first goal for AC Horsens in more than a year with a game-winning header against AGF in the 2007-08 Superliga season opener. AC Horsens played four seasons in the Superliga, in which Lodberg scored 11 goals in 109 Superliga games, before being relegated to the 1st Division in the summer 2009.

In the summer of 2012 Lodberg moved to Superliga team SønderjyskE on a 2 1/2-year contract on a free transfer after 8 years at AC Horsens as the two parties failed to reach an agreement for a contract extension in January 2012. In the summer of 2015, Lodberg returned to AC Horsens on a 2-year contract.

=== Coaching career ===
Lodberg announced his retirement from active football in January 2016. He wanted to focus solely on his coaching duties, as he had been offered a job as an assistant manager at Horsens, which he accepted.

In January 2017, it was confirmed that Lodberg would return to his former club SønderjyskE from the 2017–18 season, this time as an assistant manager to Claus Nørgaard. The club confirmed his departure in June 2021. However, he returned to SønderjyskE again on 16 December 2021, as he was announced together with newly hired manager Henrik Hansen.

In January 2023, Lodberg was hired as assistant coach at FC Midtjylland under manager Albert Capellas. On 13 December 2024, Lodberg was fired in Midtjylland.
