= Right to Dream Park =

Football stadium in Farum, Denmark

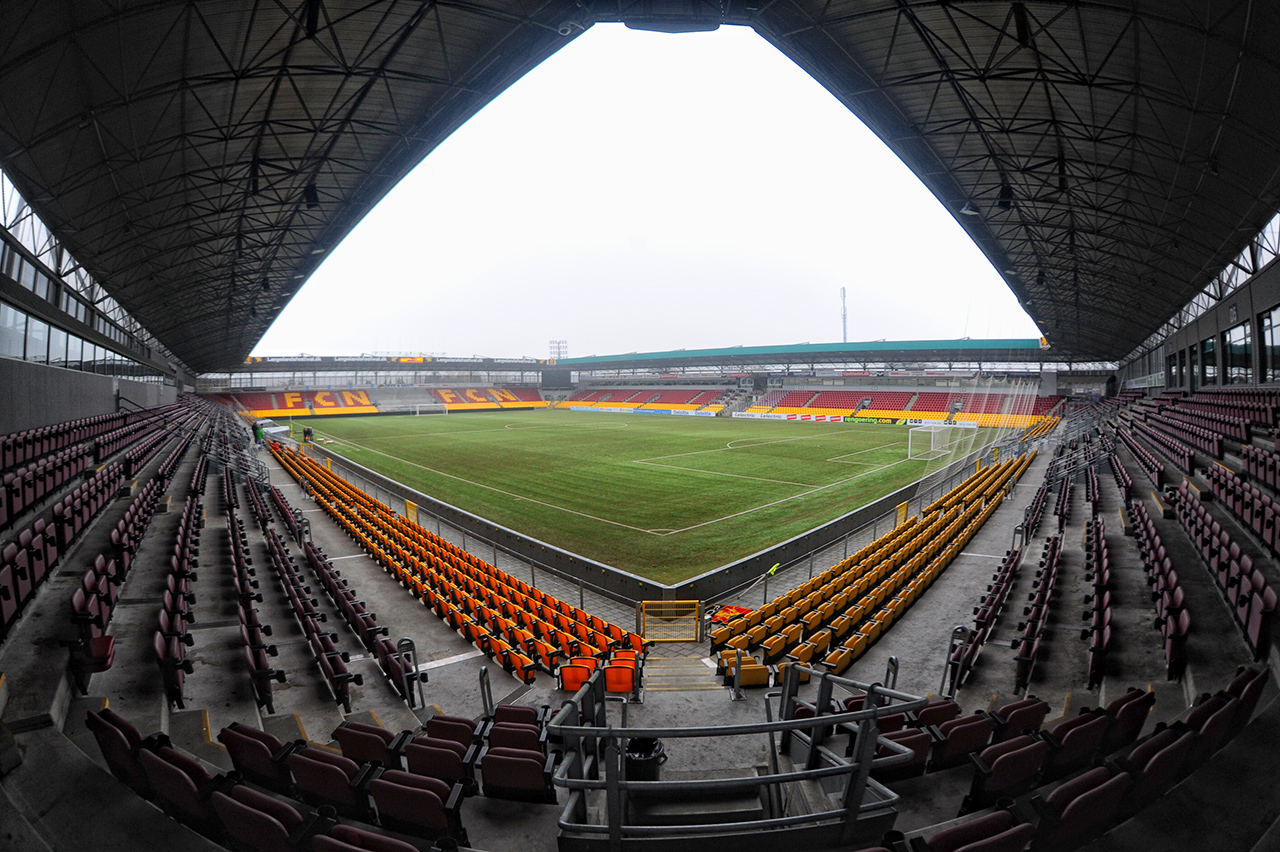
- Interactive map of Right to Dream Park
- Location: Idrætsvænget 2; 3520 Farum
- Coordinates: 55°48′57″N 12°21′12″E
- Owner: Furesø Municipality
- Capacity: 9,200 (all seats)
- Surface: Artificial turf
- Record attendance: 10,300 (Nordsjælland vs. Horsens, 2012)
- Field size: 105 x 68 m

Construction
- Built: 1999
- Opened: 1999
- Architect: Gert Andersen ApS
- Structural engineer: Jørgen Wessberg A/S
- General contractor: Hoffmann A/S

Tenants
- Nordsjælland (Danish Superliga) (2003–present); Farum Boldklub (1999–present); Denmark under-21 national team (2002–2006); Mermaid Bowl (?-2011); UEFA European Under-17 Football Championship (2002); Hillerød Fodbold (2023–2025)

Right to Dream Park, historically known as Farum Park, is a football stadium in Farum, Denmark. It is the home ground of FC Nordsjælland and Hillerød Fodbold. The stadium has a capacity of 9,200 of which all are seated. Farum Park is the first stadium in the Danish Superliga with artificial turf, installed in 2012. The grass is from Limonta Sport - a leading company in the production and distribution of synthetic grass for sports. Farum Park is a modern stadium with LED-banners, a hotel with 35 rooms and a fitness center.

Farum Park was renamed Right to Dream Park in 2016 as a tribute to the club's partnership with Right to Dream Academy.

== National games ==
Right to Dream Park has three times been used as home ground for the Denmark women's national football team. Further it has been venue of several youth and women's national matches:

Date	Home team	Res.	Away team	Competition	Spectators
26 April 2000	Denmark U-21	1–2	Sweden U-21	Friendly match	4,418
4 May 2000	Denmark U-21	0–7	Norway U-21	Friendly match	?
24 April 2001	Denmark U-21	0–2	Slovenia U-21	Friendly match	1,822
27 April 2002	Denmark U-17	4–4	Netherlands U-17	2002 UEFA European Under-17 Football Championship	?
29 April 2002	Denmark U-17	6–0	Finland U-17	2002 UEFA European Under-17 Football Championship	?
11 October 2002	Denmark U-21	9–0	Luxembourg U-21	2004 UEFA European Under-21 Football Championship qualifying	1,117
19 November 2002	Denmark U-21	0–1	Poland U-21	Friendly match	553
6 June 2003	Denmark U-21	2–0	Norway U-21	2004 UEFA European Under-21 Football Championship qualifying	2,005
9 September 2003	Denmark U-21	0–0	Romania U-21	2004 UEFA European Under-21 Football Championship qualifying	1,485
15 November 2003	Denmark U-21	1–1	Italy U-21	2004 UEFA European Under-21 Football Championship qualifying	2,815
22 May 2004	Denmark	2–0	Spain	2005 UEFA Women's Championship qualifying	1,117
3 September 2004	Denmark U-21	3–2	Ukraine U-21	2006 UEFA European Under-21 Football Championship qualifying	608
12 October 2004	Denmark U-21	1–1	Turkey U-21	2006 UEFA European Under-21 Football Championship qualifying	1,938
7 June 2005	Denmark U-21	7–0	Albania U-21	2006 UEFA European Under-21 Football Championship qualifying	1,343
6 September 2005	Denmark U-21	1–0	Georgia U-21	2006 UEFA European Under-21 Football Championship qualifying	1,024
25 September 2005	Denmark	3–0	Belgium	2007 FIFA Women's World Cup qualifying	1,316
7 October 2005	Denmark U-21	2–1	Greece U-21	2006 UEFA European Under-21 Football Championship qualifying	1,047
5 September 2006	Denmark U-21	0–2	Sweden U-21	2007 UEFA European Under-21 Football Championship qualifying	2,375
30 August 2008	Denmark	1–2	Sweden	Friendly match	2,345
9 June 2009	Denmark U-21	0–4	Italy U-23	Unofficial match	1,570

== Attendance average for FC Nordsjælland in Right to Dream Park ==
2016/2017: 2,650
2015/2016: 3,877
2014/2015: 4,257
2013/2014: 5,179
2012/2013: 5,874
2011/2012: 5,801
2010/2011: 4,470
2009/2010: 4,636
2008/2009: 4,020
2007/2008: 4,197
2006/2007: 3,859
2005/2006: 3,504
2004/2005: 2,968
2003/2004: 2,962
2002/2003: 3,355

== See also ==
- FC Nordsjælland
- List of football stadiums in Denmark
