= Thomas Augustinussen =

Danish footballer (born 1981)

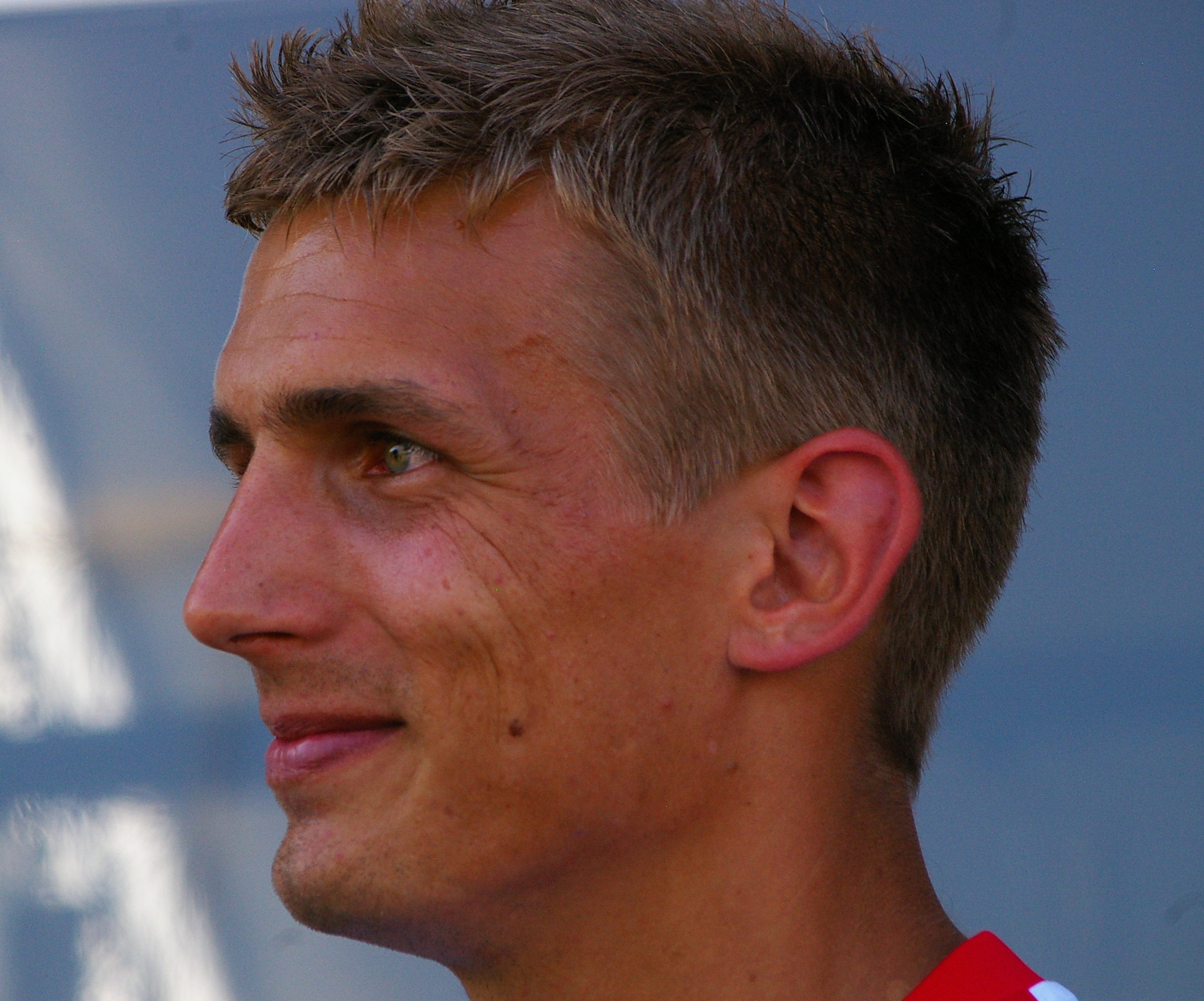

Personal information
- Date of birth: 20 March 1981 (age 45)
- Place of birth: Svendborg, Denmark
- Height: 1.92 m (6 ft 3 1/2 in)
- Position: Defensive midfielder

Youth career
- 1986–1994: Aabybro IF
- 1994–2000: AaB

Senior career*
Years	Team	Apps	(Gls)
2000–2009	AaB	223	(29)
2009–2011	Red Bull Salzburg	21	(0)
2011–2016	AaB	117	(7)

International career
1998–1999	Denmark U-19	8	(2)
2002	Denmark U-20	5	(1)
2000–2003	Denmark U-21	20	(5)
2008–2009	Denmark	2	(0)
2006–2008	Denmark League XI	5	(1)

Managerial career
- 2016–2019: AaB (assistant)
- 2020: AaB (assistant)
- * Club domestic league appearances and goals as of 9 December 2015

Thomas Augustinussen (born 20 March 1981) is a retired Danish professional footballer. He began his career as a striker, but moved gradually into the holding midfielder position. He made his senior debut with AaB, with whom he played 420 games and won the 2008 and 2014 Danish Superliga championship. He retired in the Summer of 2016 and became assistant coach in AaB. He has been capped twice for the Denmark national football team.

== Club career ==
Augustinussen started his career with AaB. Due to his height of 192 cm and good speed, Augustinussen played his first years as a striker. He made his Danish Superliga debut for AaB in April 2000. He was a successful striker in his youth years, but had difficulty finding his goalscoring form as a senior. As he only managed to score 11 goals in his first three-and-a-half years as a senior, Augustinussen was stamped by a media pundit as being "not the fastest moped on the dockside" ("ikke den hurtigste knallert på havnen") in August 2003, and did not look like cutting it at the highest sporting level of Danish football.

However, Augustinussen was moved back to the centre midfield by new AaB coach Erik Hamren, where he established himself as a consistent part of the starting line-up. He suffered a knee injury in October 2006, but returned to the AaB side in August 2007, and helped the team win the 2007–08 Superliga championship. He was named team captain from the beginning of the 2008–09 season, and led AaB in the 2008-09 UEFA Champions League tournament. In total, he played 283 games and scored 36 goals for AaB, including 223 games and 29 goals in the Superliga until May 2009.

In April 2009, he signed a three-year contract with Austrian club FC Red Bull Salzburg, effective from July 2009. After one-and-a-half year in Salzburg, Augustinussen was released from Salzburg of his own will.

On 30 January 2011 AaB announced that they had signed Augustinussen on a three-year contract.

Three years later in the 2013-14 Danish Superliga season, Augustinussen and AaB won "The Double". It was the first time ever, that the club won the league and captured the Danish Cup as well. Augustinussen was captain in the historical season.

== Coaching career ==
=== AaB ===
On 17 March 2016 it was announced that Augustinussen would retire in the summer of 2016. He would continue in AaB as assistant coach.

== International career ==
Augustinussen started his international career with the Under-19 national selection. He was capped 20 times for the Danish under-21 national team, with five goals the result.

In June 2008, he made his debut for the senior Denmark national football team in a friendly match 1–1 draw with Poland, coming on as a substitute to replace Christian Poulsen in the 77th minute. He played his second national team game in June 2009, replacing Christian Poulsen in the 71st minute of 1–0 win against Sweden in the 2010 FIFA World Cup qualification tournament.

== Honours ==
=== Playing career ===
AaB

- Danish Superliga (2) 2007–08, 2013–14
- Danish Cup (1) 2013–14

Red Bull Salzburg

- Austrian Football Bundesliga (1) 2009–10

=== Individual ===
- Danish Cup Fighter of the year (årets pokalfighter) (1) 2009

Sporting positions
Preceded by Danny Califf	AaB captain 2008–2009	Succeeded by Andreas Johansson
