= 2011–12 Danish Superliga =

22nd season of Danish Superliga

Danish Superliga
- Season: 2011–12
- Champions: FC Nordsjælland
- Relegated: Lyngby BK; HB Køge
- Champions League: FC Nordsjælland; F.C. Copenhagen
- Europa League: FC Midtjylland; AC Horsens; AGF
- Matches: 198
- Goals: 540 (2.73 per match)
- Top goalscorer: Dame N'Doye (17)
- Biggest home win: Brøndby 5–0 HB Køge; Horsens 5–0 SønderjyskE; SønderjyskE 5-0 AaB
- Biggest away win: HB Køge 0–5 Copenhagen
- Highest scoring: Nordsjælland 5–3 AGF
- Longest winning run: 8 (F.C. Copenhagen)
- Longest unbeaten run: 12 (F.C. Copenhagen)
- Longest losing run: 5 (OB)
- Highest attendance: 25,651 (F.C. Copenhagen v AGF)
- Lowest attendance: 1,059 (Lyngby Boldklub v AC Horsens)
- Average attendance: 7,106

The 2011–12 Danish Superliga season was the 22nd season of the Danish Superliga, which decided the Danish football championship. The season began on 16 July 2011 with OB, the previous season's runners-up playing the cup winners FC Nordsjælland. It concluded on 25 May 2012 with six simultaneous matches. F.C. Copenhagen were the defending champions, having won their ninth league championship and third consecutively last season.

Since Denmark climbed from fifteenth to twelfth place in the UEFA association coefficient rankings at the end of the 2010–11 season, the 2011–12 league champions entered directly the group stage of the UEFA Champions League instead of having to compete in the qualifying rounds. The remaining allocation of European spots remains unchanged.

== Teams ==
Randers and Esbjerg finished the 2010–11 season in 11th and 12th place, respectively, and were relegated to the 2011–12 1st Division. Randers were relegated after five seasons in the Superliga, while Esbjerg leave after 10 seasons in the league.

The relegated teams were replaced by 2010–11 1st Division champions AGF and runners-up HB Køge. Both clubs make their immediate return to the highest Danish football league.

=== Stadia and locations ===
Locations of the Danish Superliga 2011–12 teams

Club	Location	Stadium	Capacity	2010–11 position
Aalborg BK	Aalborg	Energi Nord Arena	13,797	10th
AC Horsens	Horsens	CASA Arena Horsens	10,400	9th
AGF	Aarhus	NRGi Park	20,032	1D, 1st
Brøndby IF	Brøndby	Brøndby Stadium	29,000	3rd
FC Copenhagen	Copenhagen	Parken	38,065	1st
FC Midtjylland	Herning	MCH Arena	11,800	4th
FC Nordsjælland	Farum	Farum Park	9,900	6th
HB Køge	Herfølge	SEAS-NVE Park	8,000	1D, 2nd
Lyngby BK	Lyngby	Lyngby Stadion	8,000	8th
OB	Odense	TRE-FOR Park	15,633	2nd
Silkeborg IF	Silkeborg	Mascot Park	10,000	5th
SønderjyskE	Haderslev	Haderslev Fodboldstadion	10,000	7th

=== Personnel and sponsoring ===
Note: Flags indicate national team as has been defined under FIFA eligibility rules. Players and Managers may hold more than one non-FIFA nationality.

Team	Head coach	Captain	Shirt sponsor
Aalborg BK	(Denmark) Kent Nielsen	(Denmark) Thomas Augustinussen	Spar Nord
AC Horsens	(Denmark) Johnny Mølby	(Denmark) Niels Lodberg	Telia Stofa
AGF	(Denmark) Peter Sørensen	(Denmark) Steffen Rasmussen	YouSee
Brøndby IF	(Lithuania) Aurelijus Skarbalius	(United States) Clarence Goodson	Unicef
F.C. Copenhagen	(Denmark) Carsten V. Jensen	(Denmark) Mathias "Zanka" Jørgensen	Carlsberg
FC Midtjylland	(Denmark) Glen Riddersholm	(Denmark) Kristian Bak Nielsen	SPAR
FC Nordsjælland	(Denmark) Kasper Hjulmand	(Denmark) Nikolai Stokholm	Arbejdernes Landsbank
HB Køge	(Denmark) Tommy Møller Nielsen	(Denmark) Thomas G. Christensen	SEAS-NVE
Lyngby BK	(Denmark) Niels Frederiksen	(Denmark) Mathias Tauber	J. Jensen A/S
OB	(Denmark) Poul Hansen (caretaker)	(Denmark) Anders Møller Christensen	Carlsberg
Silkeborg IF	(Denmark) Troels Bech	(Denmark) Henrik Pedersen	Mascot International
SønderjyskE	(Denmark) Lars Søndergaard	(Denmark) Michael Larsen	Frøs Herreds Sparekasse

=== Managerial changes ===
Team	Outgoing manager	Manner of departure	Date of vacancy	Replaced by	Date of appointment	Position in table
SønderjyskE	(Denmark) Michael Hemmingsen	Signed by Randers FC	29 May 2011	(Denmark) Lars Søndergaard	9 June 2011	Pre-Season
F.C. Copenhagen	(Norway) Ståle Solbakken	End of contract	31 May 2011	(Sweden) Roland Nilsson	1 June 2011	Pre-Season
FC Nordsjælland	(Denmark) Morten Wieghorst	Signed by Denmark U21	30 June 2011	(Denmark) Kasper Hjulmand	1 July 2011	Pre-Season
Brøndby IF	(Denmark) Henrik Jensen	Sacked	24 October 2011	(Lithuania) Aurelijus Skarbalius	24 October 2011	10th
HB Køge	(Lithuania) Aurelijus Skarbalius	Signed by Brøndby IF	24 October 2011	(Denmark) Tommy Møller Nielsen	24 October 2011	12th
F.C. Copenhagen	(Sweden) Roland Nilsson	Sacked	9 January 2012	(Denmark) Carsten V. Jensen	9 January 2012	1st
Odense Boldklub	(Denmark) Henrik Clausen	Sacked	26 March 2012	(Denmark) Poul Hansen (caretaker)	26 March 2012	9th

Originally, Skarbalius was meant to take over the assistant coach job at Brøndby on 31 December 2011 at the end of his HB Køge contract and be replaced by Tommy Møller Nielsen, however on 24 October Henrik Jensen was fired and the move was moved forwards, while Skarbalius was made head coach.

Roland Nilsson became the second head coach to be fired with his team top of the Superliga after Christian Andersen was fired by Akademisk Boldklub after 11 rounds of the 1998–99 season.

== League table ==
Pos	Team	Pld	W	D	L	GF	GA	GD	Pts	Qualification or relegation
1	Nordsjælland (C)	33	21	5	7	49	22	+27	68	Qualification to Champions League group stage
2	Copenhagen	33	19	9	5	55	26	+29	66	Qualification to Champions League third qualifying round
3	Midtjylland	33	17	7	9	50	40	+10	58	Qualification to Europa League play-off round (Note: Because 2011–12 Danish Cup winners Copenhagen qualified for the Champions League, and runners-up Horsens qualified for the Europa League through league position, the distribution of the Europa League spots reverted to league positions.)
4	Horsens	33	17	6	10	53	39	+14	57	Qualification to Europa League third qualifying round
5	AGF	33	12	12	9	47	40	+7	48	Qualification to Europa League second qualifying round
6	SønderjyskE	33	11	11	11	48	51	−3	44	
7	AaB	33	12	8	13	42	48	−6	44	
8	Silkeborg IF	33	11	10	12	51	47	+4	43	
9	Brøndby	33	9	9	15	35	46	−11	36	
10	OB	33	8	10	15	46	50	−4	34	
11	Lyngby Boldklub (Note: Lyngby Boldklub were originally deducted 3 points on 22 September 2011 for failing to have had the contract of former player Lasse Rise approved by the Danish FA, however they appealed the verdict and were returned the 3 points on 19 October 2011) (R)	33	8	4	21	32	60	−28	28	Relegation to Danish 1st Division
12	HB Køge (R)	33	4	7	22	32	71	−39	19	Relegation to Danish 1st Division

Source: Danish Football Association
Rules for classification: 1) points; 2) goal difference; 3) number of goals scored.
(C) Champions; (R) Relegated

== Results ==
=== Matchday 1–11 ===
Home \ Away	AaB	ACH	AGF	BIF	FCK	FCM	FCN	HBK	LBK	OB	SIF	SJE
AaB			2–1			1–0	1–2		1–2	2–1		
Horsens	3–3		0–3		0–1			3–0		4–3		
AGF				0–0		4–2	1–0		2–1	2–2		
Brøndby	2–2	1–4			1–2			5–0	1–0			2–2
Copenhagen	2–0		1–1			2–0	2–0			2–2	2–1	
Midtjylland		1–0		2–1			2–1		2–1		1–2	2–0
Nordsjælland		1–1		2–0				2–0	4–0		2–1	1–0
HB Køge	1–4		0–2		2–4	2–3					3–0	
Lyngby Boldklub		1–1			0–1			3–1			0–2	0–1
OB				2–1		1–4	2–0	2–1	3–1			2–4
Silkeborg IF	1–1	1–1	1–1	0–1						1–3		1–1
SønderjyskE	0–0	1–3	3–1		0–2			0–0				

Source: Danish Football Association (in Danish)
Legend: Blue = home team win; Yellow = draw; Red = away team win.

=== Matchday 12–33 ===
Home \ Away	AaB	ACH	AGF	BIF	FCK	FCM	FCN	HBK	LBK	OB	SIF	SJE
AaB		2–0	0–2	1–0	1–1	1–2	0–2	1–0	1–0	2–1	3–1	1–2
Horsens	1–0		3–1	2–0	2–0	2–1	0–2	2–1	0–0	0–1	1–1	5–0
AGF	1–1	1–3		5–1	0–0	0–2	1–1	2–0	2–1	0–0	0–2	1–3
Brøndby	1–1	0–1	0–0		2–1	0–2	0–1	1–1	2–1	1–0	3–2	1–0
Copenhagen	3–0	2–1	0–0	3–1		0–0	1–3	2–1	3–0	1–1	2–1	2–0
Midtjylland	1–3	4–1	0–2	1–0	1–0		1–1	2–1	1–2	2–0	2–2	1–1
Nordsjælland	1–0	3–0	5–3	1–2	1–0	0–0		2–0	0–1	0–0	2–1	2–0
HB Køge	1–1	2–1	1–3	1–1	0–5	1–1	0–2		1–4	1–1	1–3	1–3
Lyngby Boldklub	3–2	1–2	1–1	1–0	1–3	1–2	0–2	2–2		1–0	2–3	0–4
OB	1–2	0–1	1–2	0–0	1–3	2–3	0–1	2–4	4–0		2–2	1–1
Silkeborg IF	4–2	0–1	2–1	2–1	0–0	4–1	1–2	0–1	3–0	1–1		1–1
SønderjyskE	5–0	1–4	1–1	3–3	2–2	1–1	1–0	2–1	3–1	0–4	2–4	

Source: Danish Football Association (in Danish)
Legend: Blue = home team win; Yellow = draw; Red = away team win.

== Top goalscorers ==
Rank	Player	Club	Goals
1	(Senegal) Dame N'Doye	Copenhagen	18
2	(Brazil) César Santin	Copenhagen	13
3	(Denmark) Nicklas Helenius	AaB	12
4	(Brazil) Gilberto Macena	Horsens	11
5	(Faroe Islands) Christian Holst	Silkeborg IF	10
5	(Denmark) Simon Makienok	Brøndby	10
7	(Denmark) Emil Larsen	Lyngby Boldklub	9
7	(Denmark) Peter Graulund	AGF	9
7	(Zimbabwe) Quincy Antipas	SønderjyskE	9
7	(Germany) Marvin Pourié	Silkeborg IF	9

== Attendances ==
No.	Club	Average	Highest
1	FC København	15,540	25,651
2	Brøndby IF	12,600	15,695
3	AGF	11,010	17,352
4	OB	7,562	12,173
5	FC Midtjylland	7,422	10,289
6	AaB	7,381	9,737
7	FC Nordsjælland	5,801	10,300
8	AC Horsens	5,039	9,064
9	Silkeborg IF	3,958	6,480
10	SønderjyskE	3,287	4,875
11	HB Køge	2,827	6,538
12	Lyngby BK	2,171	4,386
