= FC Nordsjælland =

Danish professional football club

Nordsjælland
- Full name: Football Club Nordsjælland
- Nickname: Tigrene (The Tigers)
- Short name: FCN or NSJ (International)
- Founded: 1991; 35 years ago
- Ground: Right to Dream Park, Farum
- Capacity: 9,200
- Owner: Pathways Group (99%)
- Chairman: Tom Vernon
- Head coach: Jens Fønsskov Olsen
- League: Superliga
- 2025–26: Superliga, 3rd of 12
- Website: fcn.dk
Home colours	Away colours	Third colours

Football Club Nordsjælland, commonly known as FC Nordsjælland, Nordsjælland (Danish pronunciation: [ˈnoɐ̯ɕeˌlænˀ]) or FCN, is a professional football club from the Danish town of Farum. Founded as Farum Boldklub from the merger of the town's two football clubs Farum IK and Stavnsholt BK in 1991, the club changed its name to FC Nordsjælland in 2003. In international competitions, the club can be transliterated as Nordsjaelland.

FCN plays in the Danish Superliga, winning its first medal in the 2002–03 season, taking third place. Since then, the Wild Tigers have made four appearances in Europe under both the old UEFA Cup format in 2003–04, 2008–09 and in the UEFA Europa League during the 2010–11 and 2011–12 seasons. In 2010, the club won its first Danish Cup and successfully defended it the following year in 2011, beating Midtjylland in both finals. FCN won the 2011–12 Danish Superliga in May 2012 which qualified the team to participate in the 2012–13 UEFA Champions League.

Nordsjælland plays its home matches at Right to Dream Park, which has a capacity of 9,200 spectators.

== History ==
=== Farum BK (1991–2003) ===
Farum Boldklub badge.

Established on 1 January 1991 from the merger of two football clubs, Farum Idræts Klub (formed in 1910) and Stavnsholt Boldklub af 1974, both from the former Farum municipality (now consolidated with Værløse as the Furesø municipality), Farum BK would become one of the few successful mergers in Danish football, but not without controversy. The club was an initiative of Farum residents including mayor Peter Brixtofte, who took a personal interest in the club by arranging sponsorship. The club kit colours became a combination of the two merged clubs, the red and white of Stavnsholt with the yellow and blue of F.I.K. combined into a kit with yellow and red striped shirts and dark blue shorts and socks, which is still used in some form to this day. Colours were not the only thing the newly formed club inherited, as Thomas Andreasen who had been with Stavnsholt BK was carried over into the new Farum squad, Andreasen would go on to make a record 295 appearances, playing from the Denmark Series all the way to the Danish Superliga, until his departure from the club in 2007.

Farum BK was placed in the second group of the Denmark Series, the fourth tier in the Danish football pyramid, though it gained promotion to the third tier after the club's maiden season. Jørgen Andersen, a former goalkeeper for Hvidovre, took over as the club's first head coach in 1992. The club stayed in the Denmark Series first group for six years. Under the guidance of manager Jørgen Tideman, who took over in 1994, Farum qualified for promotion into the 2nd Division in the 1997–98 season and subsequently turned professional for the first time in club history.

Farum's first full season as a professional club was a fruitful one, edging out Aalborg Chang and Skive by one point, gaining promotion for the second time in two years into the 1st Division. The club's meteoric rise was slowed at first with the new challenge of playing in the Danish second tier, though it was not stopped, ending the 1999–2000 campaign with a respectable eighth-place finish, winning the same number of games as it lost. Farum, however, remained unable to make any sort of impact in the Danish Cup, having lost in the first round for the previous three years since making its debut in the tournament in the 1997–98 season. The following year saw some progression in both the league and cup, improving on the previous year's finish by finishing fifth, three spots and nine points behind second-placed promotion winners Vejle, as well as breaking out of the first round of the Danish Cup to eventually fall to Fremad Amager in the third round following a 2–1 loss.

With the 2001–02 season, unconventional coach Christian Andersen was brought in to manage the team, building on the foothold the club had gained in the 1st Division. Jeppe Tengbjerg played a pivotal role, brought in from B.93 the previous year. He scored 16 goals, becoming Farum's top goalscorer of the season and third overall in the league. The team went on to earn promotion into the Superliga after finishing in second place, 11 points clear of third-placed Sønderjylland, one point behind first-place winners Køge, scoring a team total of 69 goals, the highest in the division that season, and losing only four games.

Farum's 2002–03 appearance in the top flight of Danish football would be its first and last under the Farum BK name. It ended the season in third place, qualifying for the UEFA Cup for the first time in its history. The club's achievement, however, was overshadowed by the scandal involving Peter Brixtofte, who had arranged for the municipality to deliberately overpay for welfare services bought from private companies that in return would sponsor the Farum football team. Brixtofte was forced to step down as chairman and the club came close to bankruptcy.

=== FC Nordsjælland (2003–present) ===
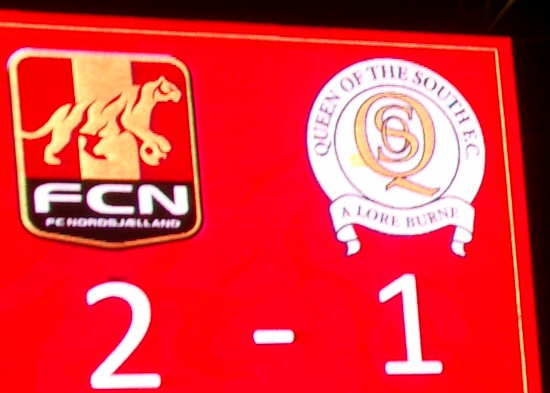
The full-time score at Farum Park.

In March 2003, Farum BK was bought by AKP Holding, the holdings company of local businessman Allan K. Pedersen, and in an effort to distance the club from the Brixtofte scandal, Farum BK was re-branded as FC Nordsjælland, named after the North Zealand (Danish: Nordsjælland) region to clarify the club was to represent both the region as well as the town in which the club is based. To reinforce the status as a regional team, a network of local football clubs from the surrounding area was created, consisting of around 66 teams, with the aim to highlight young talent in the region and bring it to national attention via FC Nordsjælland. The network is known as Fodbold Samarbejde Nordsjælland (FSN).

The club's second year in the Superliga, first as Nordsjælland, struggled to improve on the previous year's outing. With its worst goal difference since turning professional, not one FCN player ended in the top ten goal scorers, fighting to avoid relegation for most of the season, ending the campaign in ninth place. The Wild Tiger fans, however, were rewarded with European football with the club's first appearance in the UEFA Cup; it beat Armenian team Shirak 6–0 on aggregate in the qualifying round, but were eliminated in the first round by Greek team Panionios. Christian Andersen was sacked at the end of the 2003–04 season, replaced by Johnny Petersen as head coach.

The following two years under Johnny Petersen were spent avoiding relegation, with no success to speak of in either the Superliga or Danish Cup. Petersen's reign was not completely amiss, as he was noted for creating a good young team and the emergence of players Mads Junker and Anders Due. For the 2006–07 season, Morten Wieghorst was promoted from assistant to head coach, a position the former Celtic player that retained for five years.

Wieghorst's first dilemma in charge of FCN was to fill the gap left by top scorer Mads Junker, sale to Dutch side Vitesse the previous winter. Morten Nordstrand came in on a free from nearby Lyngby after scoring 29 goals in the 1st Division that previous season. Nordstrand would go on to make an instant impact, topping the goal scorers charts for the first half of the 2006–07 season and earning himself a call up to the Denmark national team. Helping the club to a fifth-place finish, Nordstrand ended the season with 18 goals after appearing in every league match that season. Danish champions Copenhagen purchased the player at the end of the season for a then record 15 million Danish kroner, becoming the largest transfer fee ever paid for a player between two Danish clubs.

With lower-than-average attendance and issues still arising from the Brixtofte scandal, chairman Allan Kim Pedersen confirmed there had been discussions to move the club north to Hillerød, where it would be able expand to other sports such as ice hockey and basketball. The move, however, never materialized.

Nordsjælland would find itself in a similar position the following season, again having sold its star striker Martin Bernburg to Copenhagen. The team only managed a ninth-place finish, yet qualified for the UEFA Cup for the second time via the UEFA Respect Fair Play rankings. 2008–09 would become a good year for the Wild Tigers in terms of cup competitions, making it to the quarter-finals in the Danish Cup for the second time in its history, and improving on its previous European outing with wins over TVMK Tallinn and Queen of the South, though later being knocked out by Greek side Olympiacos 0–7 aggregate.

In October 2008, Allan K. Pedersen sold FC Nordsjælland from AKP Holding to himself for a reported 500,000 Danish kroner, shortly before his holding company went bankrupt, a price Pedersen, however, denies. Following an investigation from his creditors, it was found that the sale was forced through without the bank's consent, and that the value for which the club was sold was too low, which ultimate reduced the finances the creators received for the sale. FCN was reevaluated to be worth 35 million kroner at the time of sale. The case has gone to the Supreme Court and is yet to be resolved; it speculated that it could take one-to-four years.

The 2009–10 season saw Nordsjælland lift its first trophy, the Danish Cup. FCN was not drawn against another Superliga team until the quarter-final meeting with Silkeborg, where it won 3–1 in extra time. The team would go on to face Midtjylland in Nordsjælland's first cup final, winning in extra time 2–0 with goals from new signing Nicolai Stokholm and Bajram Fetai, and qualifying for European competition in the newly remodeled UEFA Europa League. The team would repeat this feat the following season, facing Midtjylland once again in the finals of the Danish Cup and winning the trophy for the second time with a 3–2 win. This would be Morten Wieghorst's last trophy with the Wild Tigers, however; he moved to manage the Denmark under-21 national team at the end of the 2010–11 campaign.

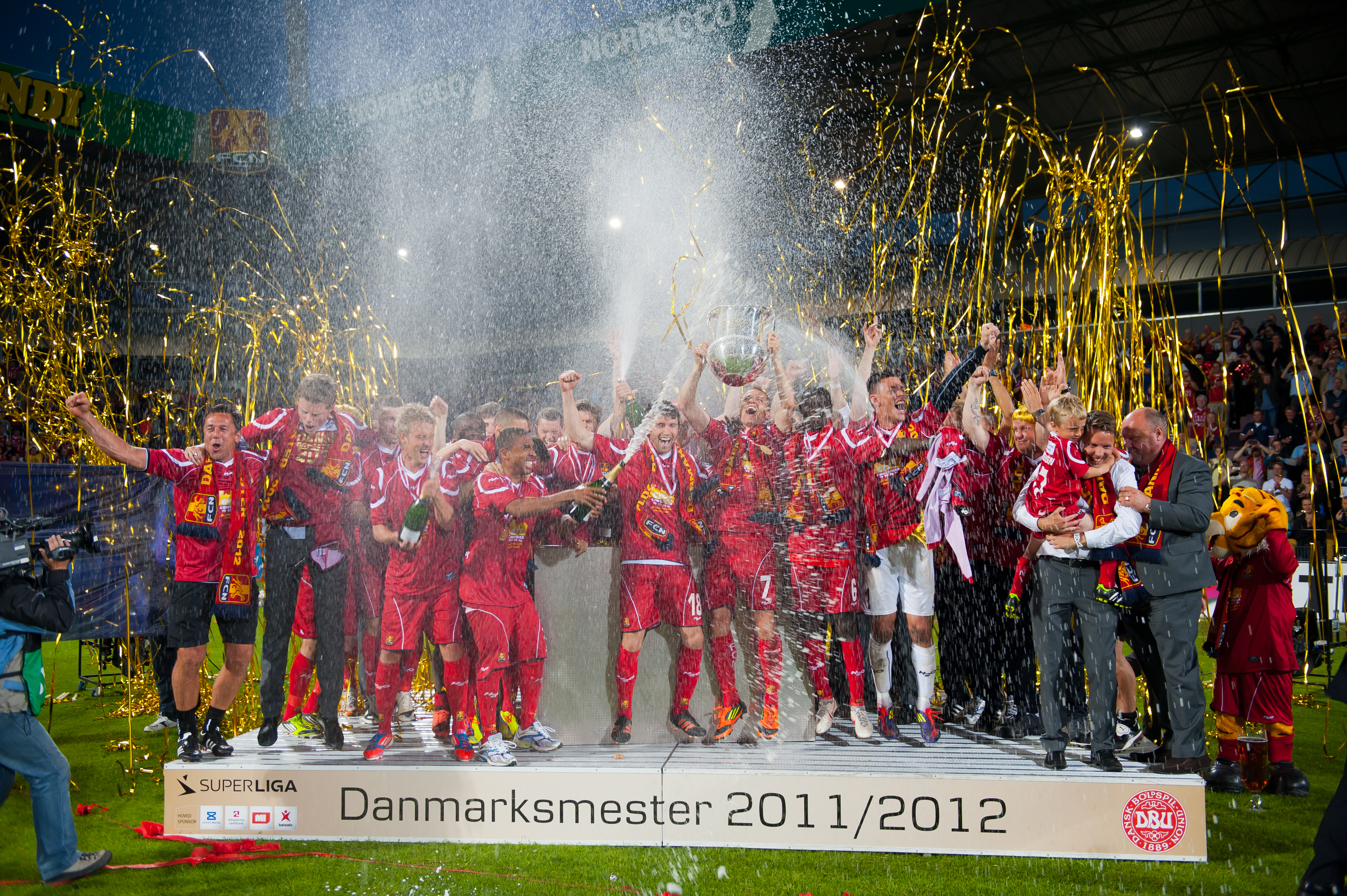
FCN celebrating the championship

Kasper Hjulmand was named Wieghorst's successor in June 2011, promoted from the coaching staff. In preparation for the 2011–12 season, the former Lyngby head coach brought in two Danish internationals in Mikkel Beckmann (from relegated Randers) and Patrick Mtiliga (on a free from Málaga). FCN sought to improve on the previous season's sixth-place finish and to defend its Danish Cup title for the second year running. It would go on to play in the Europa League for second year in a row, exiting the competition in the third qualifying round after losing to Sporting CP 2–1 aggregate, which had also eliminated Nordsjælland from Europe the previous season.

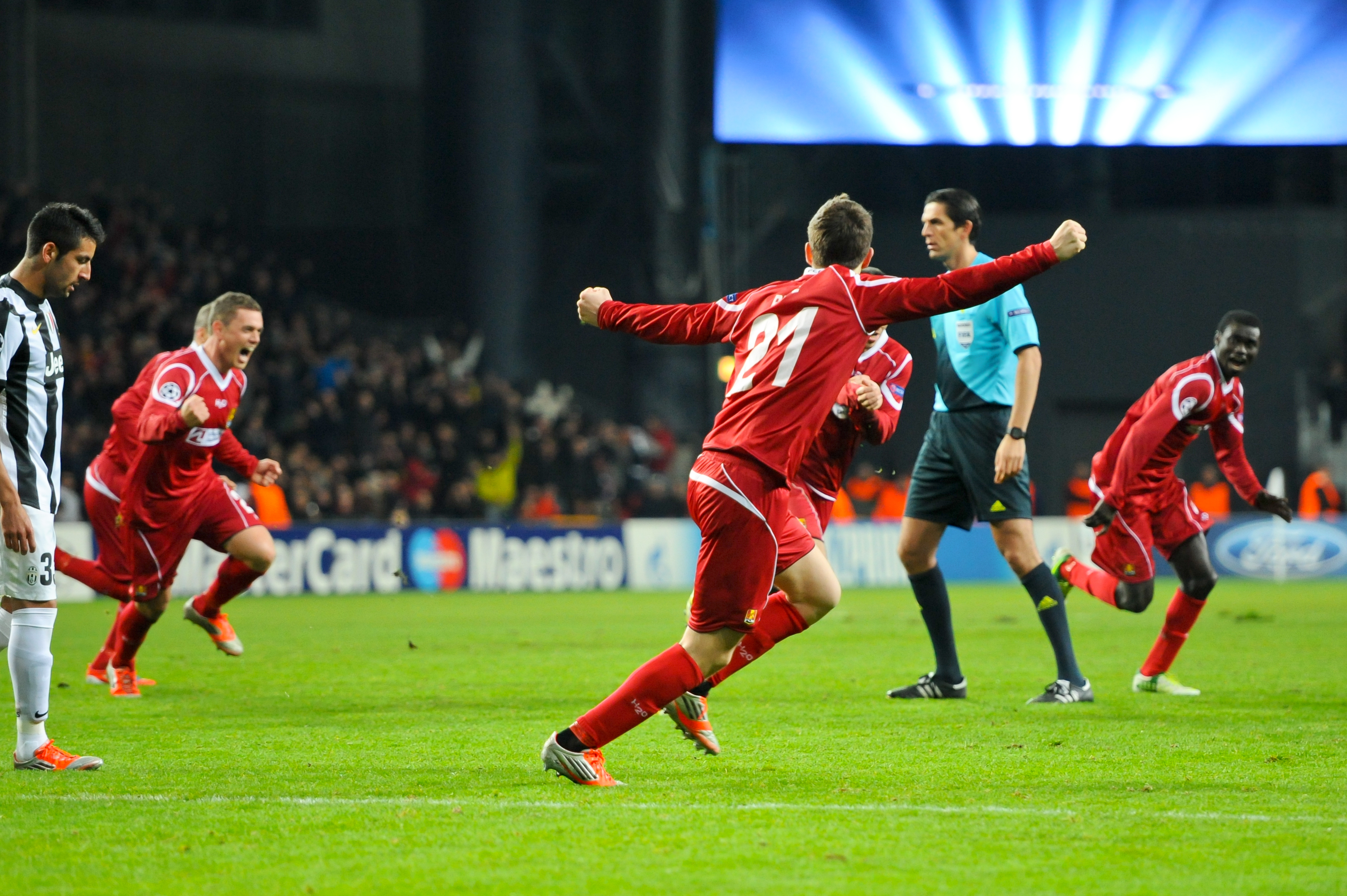
FCN against Juventus in the UEFA Champions League

FCN started the new season in good form, peaking as high as second in the Superliga, and an undefeated run at home in all competitions until 30 October, including an impressive 0–0 draw with Portuguese side Sporting CP, making the start of the 2011–12 campaign one of its best starts in recent years. For the first time in club history, a total of five players were called up to the Denmark national team to face Sweden and Finland in November: Mikkel Beckmann, Andreas Bjelland and debutantes Tobias Mikkelsen, Jesper Hansen and Jores Okore. FCN ended the season as Superliga champions for the first time in its history.

In 2012–13, for the first time FCN participated in the UEFA Champions League, where it was drawn into a difficult group alongside defending champions Chelsea, Serie A champions Juventus and Ukrainian Premier League champions Shakhtar Donetsk. FCN played all its home matches at the Danish national stadium, Parken. It gained one point from the group stage – playing 1–1 against Juventus at home thanks to a direct free-kick goal from Beckmann. In the last group match, a controversial goal from Luiz Adriano became the talking point of the match.

== Players ==
=== Current squad ===
As of 3 September 2026

Note: Flags indicate national team as defined under FIFA eligibility rules; some limited exceptions apply. Players may hold more than one non-FIFA nationality.

No.	Pos.	Nation	Player
2	DF	DEN	Peter Ankersen
3	DF	DEN	Tobias Salquist (captain)
4	DF	DEN	Noah Markmann
5	DF	FIN	Juho Lähteenmäki
6	MF	DEN	Mark Brink
8	MF	DEN	Nicklas Røjkjær
9	FW	NOR	Ola Solbakken
10	FW	GHA	Prince Amoako Junior
11	FW	DEN	Alexander Lind
13	GK	DEN	Andreas Hansen
14	FW	EGY	Ibrahim Adel
15	DF	GHA	Stephen Acquah
16	GK	DEN	Jakob Busk
18	MF	DEN	Justin Janssen
22	GK	FIN	Carljohan Eriksson

No.	Pos.	Nation	Player
23	DF	NOR	Runar Norheim
25	DF	DEN	Victor Nelsson
28	DF	DEN	Markus Walker
29	FW	DEN	Villum Berthelsen
31	GK	DEN	Andreas Søndenbroe
32	DF	DEN	Victor Gustafsen
33	FW	BFA	Souleymane Alio
35	DF	DEN	Villads Rutkjær
37	MF	SEN	Lamine Sadio
40	FW	DEN	Hjalte Boe
42	DF	SWE	Matej Tuka
43	FW	CIV	Mouekeinga Kone
47	MF	DEN	Malte Heyde
49	FW	DEN	William Faber

=== Youth players in use 2026-27 ===
Note: Flags indicate national team as defined under FIFA eligibility rules; some limited exceptions apply. Players may hold more than one non-FIFA nationality.

No.	Pos.	Nation	Player
–	FW	SWE	Rayan Bardghji

In July 2026, Malian midfielder Mohamed Ousmane Daff, a graduate of the Right Dream Academy, signed his first professional contract with FC Nordsjælland. Daff said he chose the Danish club because of its strong reputation for developing young players.

=== Out on loan ===
Note: Flags indicate national team as defined under FIFA eligibility rules; some limited exceptions apply. Players may hold more than one non-FIFA nationality.

No.	Pos.	Nation	Player
17	FW	CIV	Levy Nene (at Lausanne-Sport until 30 June 2027)
30	DF	GHA	Issaka Seidu (at IFK Göteborg until 30 June 2027)

No.	Pos.	Nation	Player
38	GK	DEN	William Lykke (at Esbjerg until 30 June 2027)
39	FW	ISL	Daniel Jóhannesson (at Kolding until 30 June 2027)

=== Retired numbers ===
26 – (Denmark) Jonathan Richter (2005–09)

=== Overall most appearances ===
Rank	Nationality	Name	Years	Appearances
1	(Denmark)	Thomas Andreasen	1999–07	295
2	(Denmark)	Søren Christensen	2005–14	233
3	(Denmark)	Jesper Hansen	2001–13	179
4	(Denmark)	Nicolai Stokholm	2008–14	178
5	(Denmark)	Magnus Kofod Andersen	2017-22	171
6	(Denmark)	Kian Hansen	2020-26	168
7	(Denmark)	Patrick Mtiliga	2011–17	167
8	(Denmark)	Jacob Steen Christensen	2018-23	158
9	(Denmark)	Henrik Kildentoft	2007–13	155
10	(Sweden)	Daniel Svensson	2020-2025	153

=== Overall top scorers ===
Rank	Nationality	Name	Years	Goals
1	(Denmark)	Marcus Ingvartsen	2014–2017, 2023–2024	53
2	(Denmark)	Martin Bernburg	2007–09	43
3	(Denmark)	Emiliano Marcondes	2012–2017	38
4	(Aruba)	Joshua John	2012–2016	30
5	(North Macedonia)	Bajram Fetai	2007–10	29
5	(Denmark)	Tommy Olsen	2003–06	29
7	(Denmark)	Mads Junker	2004–06	28
8	(Sweden)	Rawez Lawan	2009–13	21
9	(Denmark)	Morten Nordstrand	2006–07, 2012–2014	20
10	(Denmark)	Thomas Kristensen	2005–08	19
10	(Denmark)	Tobias Mikkelsen	2009–2013,2016–18	19

=== Former players ===
Denmark

- (Denmark) Martin Bernburg
- (Denmark) Andreas Bjelland
- (Denmark) Mikkel Damsgaard
- (Denmark) Anders Due
- (Denmark) Carsten Fredgaard
- (Denmark) Daniel Jensen
- (Denmark) Mathias Jensen
- (Denmark) Peter Vindahl Jensen
- (Denmark) Mads Junker
- (Denmark) Thomas Kristensen
- (Denmark) Kasper Lorentzen
- (Denmark) Tobias Mikkelsen
- (Denmark) Nicki Bille Nielsen
- (Denmark) Matti Lund Nielsen
- (Denmark) Danny Olsen
- (Denmark) Tommy Olsen
- (Denmark) Andreas Skov Olsen
- (Denmark) Nicklas Pedersen
- (Denmark) Stephan Petersen
- (Denmark) Thomas Rasmussen
- (Denmark) Michael Ribers
- (Denmark) Jonathan Richter
- (Denmark) Simon Richter
- (Denmark) Kris Stadsgaard
- (Denmark) Jeppe Tengbjerg
- (Denmark) Ulrich Vinzents

Canada

- (Canada) Patrice Bernier
- (Canada) Issey Nakajima-Farran

Costa Rica

- (Costa Rica) Bryan Oviedo

Finland

- (Finland) Oliver Antman
- (Finland) Carljohan Eriksson
- (Finland) Leo Walta

Ghana

- (Ghana) Enoch Kofi Adu
- (Ghana) Ernest Nuamah
- (Ghana) Francis Dickoh
- (Ghana) Mohammed Kudus
- (Ghana) Kamaldeen Sulemana
- (Ghana) Caleb Yirenkyi

Ivory Coast

- (Ivory Coast) Simon Adingra
- (Ivory Coast) Mohamed Diomande

Japan

- (Japan) Yoshikatsu Kawaguchi

Macedonia

- (North Macedonia) Bajram Fetai
- (North Macedonia) Dževdet Šainovski

Malawi

- (Malawi) Joseph Kamwendo

Norway

- (Norway) Andreas Schjelderup
- (Norway) Lars Bohinen
- (Norway) Ulrik Yttergård Jenssen

Slovakia

- (Slovakia) Stanislav Lobotka

Sweden

- (Sweden) Pierre Bengtsson
- (Sweden) Andreas Dahl
- (Sweden) Benjamin Kibebe
- (Sweden) Johnny Lundberg
- (Sweden) Benjamin Nygren
- (Sweden) Marcus Pode
- (Sweden) Daniel Svensson

Switzerland

- (Switzerland) Johan Djourou

Turkey

- (Turkey) Emre Mor

United States

- (United States) Michael Parkhurst
- (United States) Heath Pearce

=== Club captains ===
Since 2001, seven players have held the position as club captain for Farum BK or FC Nordsjælland. The first recorded captain was Michael Elbæk. All recorded captains to date have been of Danish nationality. The captain to have lifted the most trophies for FCN is Nicolai Stokholm, who won the Danish Cup on two occasions. Stokholm is also the current and longest-serving captain, having taken over from Henrik Kildentoft when the former arrived at the club in 2009.

Years	Nationality	Name
????–2002	(Denmark)	Michael Elbæk
2002–2004	(Denmark)	Martin Birn
2004–2005	(Denmark)	Jacob Rasmussen
2005–2006	(Denmark)	Tommy Olsen
2006–2008	(Denmark)	Kim Christensen
2008–2009	(Denmark)	Henrik Kildentoft
2009–2014	(Denmark)	Nicolai Stokholm
2014–2018	(Denmark)	Patrick Mtiliga
2018	(Denmark)	Mathias Jensen
2018–2019	(Denmark)	Victor Nelsson
2019–2020	(Denmark)	Nicolai Larsen
2020–2025	(Denmark)	Kian Hansen
2025-	(Denmark)	Mark Brink

== Stadium ==
Nordsjælland plays its home matches in Right to Dream Park, which has a capacity of 9,200 attendances. The stadium is the first in Denmark with artificial turf.

== Club officials ==
As of 28 July 2025

Position	Name
Chairman	Dan Hammer
Board Members	Mads Davidsen
Board Members	Dan Dickinson
CEO	Trine Hesselund Hopp Møller
CFO	Flemming Junggaard Skou
Director of Football	Alexander Riget
Assistant Sporting Director	Hossam El Zanaty
Academy Director	Juan Jose Jacob Peñalver
Advisor	Flemming Pedersen
Manager	Jens Fønsskov Olsen
Assistant Coaches	Casper Røjkjær
Assistant Coaches	Christian Sørensen
Individual Player Coach	Michael Essien
Goalkeeping Coach	Magnus Pondus Hansen
Transitional Coach	Thomas Kristensen
Head of Analysis	Thor Herdal
Analyzer	Christoffer Karne
Head of Human Performance	Kasper Henriksen
Head of Medical	Matthew Delang
Head of Physical Development	Anders P. Lund
Physical Coach	Mads Kjær
Doctor	Jesper Petersen
Physiotherapists	Simon Meincke
Physiotherapists	Jonas Petersen
Mental Performance Coach	Troels Thorsteinsson
Head of Nutrition	Bruno Cirillo
Head of Sports and Data Science	Lasse Ishøi
Data Scientist	Christian Rønsholt

=== Managerial history ===
Name	Nationality	From	To	Honours
Christian Andersen	Denmark	1 July 2003	2004	Promotion to Superliga
Johnny Petersen	Denmark	1 January 2005	30 June 2006	
Morten Wieghorst	Denmark	1 July 2006	30 June 2011	2 Danish Cups
Kasper Hjulmand	Denmark	1 July 2011	1 June 2014	1 Superliga Championship
Ólafur Kristjánsson	Iceland	1 June 2014	15 December 2015	
Kasper Hjulmand	Denmark	1 January 2016	25 March 2019	
Flemming Pedersen	Denmark	25 March 2019	7 January 2023	
Johannes Hoff Thorup	Denmark	7 January 2023	30 May 2024	
Jens Fønsskov Olsen	Denmark	24 June 2024	Present	

Key

* Served as caretaker manager.
† Served as caretaker manager before being appointed permanently.

== Honours ==
=== National tournaments ===
- Danish Superliga
  - Champions (1): 2011–12
  - Runners-up (2): 2012–13, 2022–23
- 1st Division
  - Runners-up (1): 2001–02
- Zealand Series
  - Runners-up (1): 1996
- Danish Cup
  - Winners (2): 2009–10, 2010–11

=== International tournaments ===
==== Friendly tournaments ====
- La Manga Cup
  - Winners (1): 2012

== Season results ==
Season	League performance									Cup performance
Season	Pos	Pts	Pld	W	D	L	GF	GA	GD	Cup performance
1997–98: Denmark Series 1	#3/8	20	14	6	2	6	22	27	−5	Eliminated in First round by Virum-Sorgenfri, 0–3
1998–99: 2nd Division	#5/16	50	30	15	5	10	57	38	+19	Eliminated in First round by Nakskov, 2–3
1999–2000: Faxe Kondi Divisionen	#8/16	42	30	12	6	12	48	58	−10	Eliminated in First round by Roskilde, 1–2
2000–01: Faxe Kondi Divisionen	#5/16	50	30	15	5	10	62	48	+14	Eliminated in Third round by Fremad A., 1–2
2001–02: 1st Division	#2/16	66	30	20	6	4	69	33	+36	Eliminated in Third round by Køge, 2–4
2002–03: SAS Ligaen	#3/12	51	33	16	3	14	49	58	−9	Eliminated in the Quarter-finals by Viborg, 2–5
2003–04: SAS Ligaen	#9/12	32	33	7	11	15	35	59	−24	Eliminated in Fifth round by Copenhagen, 2–4
2004–05: SAS Ligaen	#10/12	30	33	8	6	19	36	59	−23	Eliminated in Fifth round by Fremad A., 2–3
2005–06: SAS Ligaen	#9/12	38	33	9	11	13	49	55	−6	Eliminated in Fourth round by Viborg, 0–3
2006–07: SAS Ligaen	#5/12	57	33	16	9	8	67	39	+28	Eliminated in Third round by OB, 0–1
2007–08: SAS Ligaen	#9/12	43	33	11	10	12	47	51	−4	Eliminated in Third round by Vejle, 1–2
2008–09: SAS Ligaen	#8/12	35	33	9	8	16	44	53	−9	Eliminated in the Quarter-finals by AaB, 1–2
2009–10: SAS Ligaen	#7/12	43	33	12	7	14	40	41	−1	Winner, won the Final against Midtjylland, 2–0 (aet)
2010–11: Superligaen	#6/12	39	33	10	9	14	38	50	−12	Winner, won the Final against Midtjylland, 3–2
2011–12: Superligaen	#1/12	68	33	21	5	7	49	22	+27	Eliminated in the Quarter-finals by Copenhagen, 0–2
2012–13: Superligaen	#2/12	60	33	17	9	7	60	37	+23	Eliminated in the Fourth round by Midtjylland, 2–3
2013–14: Superligaen	#6/12	46	33	13	7	13	38	44	−6	Eliminated in the Semi-finals by Copenhagen, 1–2
2014–15: Superligaen	#6/12	44	33	13	5	15	39	44	−5	Eliminated in the Second round by SC Egedal, 1–1 (3–4 p)
2015–16: Superligaen	#9/12	38	33	11	5	17	35	51	−16	Eliminated in the Second round by Næstved BK, 0–1
2016–17: Superligaen	#5/14	49	36	13	10	13	59	55	+4	Eliminated in the Third round by Næstved BK, 0–1
2017–18: Superligaen	#3/14	59	36	17	8	11	76	58	+18	Eliminated in the Fourth round by Hobro IK, 1–1 (3–4 p)
2018–19: Superligaen	#6/14	44	36	10	14	12	52	54	–2	Eliminated in the Fourth round by Vendsyssel FF, 0–1
2019–20: Superligaen	#6/14	47	36	13	8	15	59	54	+5	Eliminated in the Fourth round by Copenhagen, 1–4
2020–21: Superligaen	#5/12	43	32	11	10	11	51	51	0	Eliminated in the Third round by Hvidovre IF, 0–2
2021–22: Superligaen	#9/12	36	32	8	12	12	38	47	-9	Eliminated in the Fourth round by OB, 1–4
2022–23: Superligaen	#2/12	55	32	15	10	7	50	35	+15	Eliminated in the Semi-finals by Copenhagen, 6–7
2023–24: Superligaen	#4/12	58	32	16	10	6	60	34	+26	Eliminated in the Semi-finals by AGF, 2–4
2024–25: Superligaen	#5/12	46	32	10	10	12	53	56	-3	Eliminated in the Fourth round by Brabrand IF, 1–1 (9–10 on penalties)
2025–26: Superligaen	#3 /12	50	32	15	5	12	51	46	+5	Eliminated in the Quarter-finals by Midtjylland, 3–6

== FC Nordsjælland in European competition ==
FC Nordsjælland's first competitive European match was on 14 August 2003, in the 2003–04 UEFA Cup, beating Shirak F.C. 4–0 at home. In total, the club has participated in European competitions in seven different seasons, reaching as far as the Group stage of the 2012–13 UEFA Champions League, with the last time qualifying for a European competition being the 2023-24 UEFA Europa Conference League.

== Fodbold Samarbejde Nordsjælland ==
Fodbold Samarbejde Nordsjælland badge for clubs in the FSN network.

The Fodbold Samarbejde Nordsjælland (Football Cooperation North Zealand or FSN in short) is a network of affiliated clubs headed by FC Nordsjælland, in which to highlight talent, youth development, cooperation and community in the North Zealand region. Where clubs participating receive benefits from FCN such as loan moves, friendlies, tickets to games, merchandise, coach visits, training camps and coaching courses. In return, FC Nordsjælland get access to a large scouting network of youth players, which has helped develop many young talent to become youth internationals, who have gone on to play professionally in the Danish Superliga and beyond. FSN has also played an important role in the attendance rise in Farum Park.

=== Affiliated clubs ===
As of 6 February 2013

- Allerød FK
- Alsønderup IF
- Ålholm Fodbold
- Ølsted IF
- Ølstykke FC
- Ballerup IF
- BFC Lundegården
- Blistrup SI
- Brødeskov IF
- Blovstrød IF
- BSV
- Dalby IF
- Dragør BK
- Døllefjelde Musse IF
- Elite 3000
- Espergærde IF
- FA 2000
- Farum BK
- Faxe Ladeplads IF
- FC Holte
- FC Jonstrup
- FIF Hillerød
- Frederikssund IK
- Frem Hellebæk
- G77 Gundsømagle
- Gilleleje FK
- Gørløse SI
- Grantoften IF
- Græsted IF
- Gundsølille IF
- Gundsømagle 77
- Gurre IK
- Hasle IF
- Hørsholm-Usserød
- Helsinge Fodbold
- Helsingør IF
- Hillerød GI
- Hornbæk IF
- Humlebæk BK
- Hundested IK
- IF Skjold Birkerød
- IS Skævinge
- Jyllinge FC
- Jægersborg BK
- Kalundborg GB
- Karlebo IF
- KBK Hillerød
- Kirke Hyllinge IF
- Kirke Værløse IF
- KFUM Roskilde
- Kr. Værløse IF
- Lolland-Falster Alliancen
- Lynge Uggeløse IF
- Måløv BK
- NB Bornholm
- Nordstevns GI
- Nødebo IF
- Nivå Kokkedal FK
- Oppe Sundby IF
- ORI Fodbold
- Raklev GI
- Ramløse Fodbold
- Skovshoved IF
- Slangerup og Omegns IF
- Slangslunde-Ganløse IF
- Snekkersten IF
- Store Lyngby IF
- Tikøb IF
- Uvelse IF
- Værløse BK
- Vejby-Tisvilde Fodbold
