= 2008–09 Odense Boldklub season =

Odense BK
2008–09 season
- Chairman: Niels Thorborg
- Manager: Lars Olsen
- Stadium: Fionia Park
- Danish Superliga: 2nd
Home colours	Away colours

The 2008–09 Odense Boldklub season was the club's 121st season, and their 48th appearance in the Danish Superliga. As well as the Superliga, they competed in the Ekstra Bladet Cup.

== First team ==
Last updated on 1 May 2009

Squad no.	Name	Nationality	Position	Date of birth (age)
Goalkeepers
1	Arek Onyszko	(Poland)	GK	12 January 1974 (aged 35)
16	David Preece	(England)	GK	26 August 1976 (aged 32)
35	Christian Kier	(Denmark)	GK	17 May 1988 (aged 21)
Defenders
2	Espen Ruud	(Norway)	RB	26 February 1984 (aged 25)
3	Atle Roar Håland	(Norway)	CB	26 July 1977 (aged 31)
5	Anders Møller Christensen	(Denmark)	CB	26 July 1977 (aged 31)
6	Thomas Helveg	(Denmark)	RB/CB	24 January 1971 (aged 38)
15	Chris Sørensen (captain)	(Denmark)	LB/CB	27 July 1977 (aged 31)
18	Jonas Troest	(Denmark)	CB	4 March 1985 (aged 24)
20	Timmi Johansen	(Denmark)	LB	8 May 1987 (aged 22)
Midfielders
4	Hans Henrik Andreasen	(Denmark)	CM/RM	10 January 1979 (aged 30)
8	Henrik Hansen	(Denmark)	CM/AM	28 July 1979 (aged 29)
11	Johan Absalonsen	(Denmark)	LM/LW	16 September 1985 (aged 23)
14	Esben Hansen	(Denmark)	CM/DM	10 August 1981 (aged 27)
17	Morten Bisgaard	(Denmark)	CM	25 June 1974 (aged 34)
19	Eric Djemba-Djemba	(Cameroon)	DM	4 May 1981 (aged 28)
21	Peter Nymann	(Denmark)	RM	22 August 1982 (aged 26)
25	Oliver Feldballe	(Denmark)	LM/AM	3 April 1990 (aged 19)
Forwards
7	Peter Utaka	(Nigeria)	ST	12 February 1984 (aged 25)
10	Björn Runström	(Sweden)	ST	1 March 1984 (aged 25)
22	Njogu Demba-Nyrén	(The Gambia)	ST	26 June 1979 (aged 29)
28	Anders K. Jacobsen	(Denmark)	ST	27 October 1989 (aged 19)

== Transfers and loans ==
=== Transfers in ===
Entry date	Position	No.	Player	From club	Fee	Ref.
1 July 2008	DF	20	(Denmark) Timmi Johansen	(Netherlands) SC Heerenveen	Loan	
1 July 2008	FW	10	(Sweden) Björn Runström	(England) Fulham	Free transfer	
1 July 2008	DF	2	(Norway) Espen Ruud	(Norway) Odd Grenland	?	
14 July 2008	MF	8	(Denmark) Henrik Hansen	(Denmark) AC Horsens	3,700,000 DKK	
16 July 2008	MF	19	(Cameroon) Eric Djemba-Djemba	Qatar SC	Free transfer	
1 August 2008	FW	29	(Ghana) Emmanuel Clottey	(Ghana) Accra Great Olympics	Loan	
8 August 2008	GK	16	(England) David Preece	(Denmark) Silkeborg IF	Free transfer	
30 August 2008	FW	7	(Nigeria) Peter Utaka	(Belgium) Royal Antwerp	1,900,000 DKK	
1 November 2008	FW	28	(Denmark) Anders K. Jacobsen	(Denmark) Vejle BK	Back from loan	
1 December 2008	GK	27	(Denmark) Anders Lindegaard	(Denmark) Kolding FC	Back from loan	
1 December 2008	FW	–	(Denmark) David Nielsen	(Norway) Strømsgodset	Back from loan	
1 December 2008	FW	–	(Serbia) Srđan Radonjić	(Norway) IK Start	Back from loan	
1 January 2009	FW	22	(The Gambia) Njogu Demba-Nyrén	(Norway) SK Brann	?	
1 May 2009	FW	–	(Serbia) Srđan Radonjić	(Austria) SC Rheindorf Altach	Back from loan	
Total					5,600,000 DKK	

=== Transfers out ===
Departure date	Position	No.	Player	To club	Fee	Ref.
23 June 2008	MF	29	(Denmark) Jonas Borring	(Denmark) FC Midtjylland	21,000,000 DKK	
30 June 2008	MF	22	(Senegal) Mustapha Papa Diop	(Denmark) FC Fyn	End of contract	
30 June 2008	MF	8	(Brazil) Bechara Oliveira	(Denmark) Vejle BK	End of contract	
1 July 2008	GK	27	(Denmark) Anders Lindegaard	(Denmark) Kolding FC	Loan	
5 August 2008	FW	–	(Serbia) Srđan Radonjić	(Norway) IK Start	Loan	
15 August 2008	FW	7	(Denmark) Mads Timm	(Denmark) Lyngby BK	Released	
6 November 2008	MF	30	(Costa Rica) Christian Bolaños	(Norway) IK Start	3,000,000 DKK	
31 December 2008	FW	29	(Ghana) Emmanuel Clottey	(Ghana) Accra Great Olympics	End of loan	
2 February 2009	MF	–	(Denmark) Matti Lund Nielsen	(Denmark) Lyngby BK	Loan	
2 February 2009	FW	–	(Serbia) Srđan Radonjić	(Austria) SC Rheindorf Altach	Loan	
12 March 2009	FW	9	(Senegal) Baye Djiby Fall	(Russia) Lokomotiv Moskva	35,000,000 DKK	
Total					59,000,000 DKK	

== Competitions ==
=== Superliga ===
==== League table ====
Pos	Team	Pld	W	D	L	GF	GA	GD	Pts	Qualification or relegation
1	Copenhagen (C)	33	23	5	5	67	26	+41	74	Qualification to Champions League second qualifying round
2	Odense	33	21	6	6	65	31	+34	69	Qualification to Europa League third qualifying round (Note: Because F.C. Copenhagen, winners of 2008–09 Danish Cup, also won the league, Odense BK as league runners-up earned a spot in the third while cup runners-up AaB qualified for the second qualifying round of the UEFA Europa League.)
3	Brøndby	33	21	5	7	55	31	+24	68	Qualification to Europa League second qualifying round
4	Midtjylland	33	16	7	10	55	46	+9	55	
5	Randers	33	11	13	9	52	50	+2	46	Qualification to Europa League first qualifying round (Note: Denmark was ranked second in the UEFA Fair Play Ranking and thereby earned an additional Europa League spot, with the winners of national Fair Play competition entering in the first qualifying round of the UEFA Europa League. That spot was granted to Randers FC because they were the best team in the national Fair Play competition which has not already qualified for Europe.)

Source: Danish Superliga
Rules for classification: 1) points; 2) goal difference; 3) number of goals scored
(C) Champions

==== Results summary ====
Overall								Home						Away					
Pld	W	D	L	GF	GA	GD	Pts	W	D	L	GF	GA	GD	W	D	L	GF	GA	GD
33	21	6	6	65	31	+34	69	14	1	2	40	15	+25	7	5	4	25	16	+9

Last updated: 31 May 2009.
Source: Worldfootball.net

==== Result by round ====
Matchday	1	2	3	4	5	6	7	8	9	10	11	12	13	14	15	16	17	18	19	20	21	22	23	24	25	26	27	28	29	30	31	32	33
Ground	A	H	H	A	A	H	H	A	H	H	A	H	A	H	A	A	H	H	A	H	A	H	H	A	H	A	A	H	A	H	A	A	H
Result	W	W	W	L	W	W	W	W	L	W	D	D	W	W	W	L	L	W	L	W	L	W	W	W	W	W	D	W	D	W	D	D	W
Position	1	1	1	2	1	1	1	1	1	1	1	1	1	1	1	2	3	3	3	3	3	3	3	3	3	3	3	3	3	3	3	3	2

Updated to match(es) played on 31 May 2009. Source: Worldfootball.net
A = Away; H = Home; W = Win; D = Draw; L = Loss

==== Matches ====
23 July 2008 1	Vejle	1–3	Odense	Vejle
19:00 CEST	Røll (yellow card) 63'; Perić 90'	Report	Sørensen (yellow card) 4'; Runström (yellow card) 16'; Djiby Fall 32', 57', (yellow card) 58'; Hansen 61'	Stadium: Vejle Stadion; Attendance: 8,081; Referee: Lars Christoffersen

3 August 2008 2	Odense	3–1	Aarhus	Odense
16:05 CEST	Christensen (yellow card) 7'; Runström (yellow card) 28', (goal) 43'; Djiby Fall 31'; Absalonsen 83'	Report	Lindkvist 31'; Thomassen (yellow card) 73'; Pleidrup (yellow card) 90'	Stadium: Fionia Park; Attendance: 10,036; Referee: Anders Hermansen

6 August 2008 3	Odense	3–1	Nordsjælland	Odense
19:00 CEST	Sørensen 39'; Absalonsen 55'; Runström 90+2'	Report	Dahl (yellow card) 28'; Kibebe (yellow card) 57'; Christensen 75'	Stadium: Fionia Park; Attendance: 9,281; Referee: Nicolai Vollquartz

10 August 2008 4	Midtjylland	4–0	Odense	Herning
16:05 CEST	Collins 11', 19', 41'; Reid (yellow card) 24'; Olsen (yellow card) 37'; Christensen 68'; Califf (yellow card) 71'	Report	Sørensen (yellow card) 30'	Stadium: SAS Arena; Attendance: 7,250; Referee: Michael Svendsen

17 August 2008 5	Aalborg	0–3	Odense	Aalborg
14:00 CEST	Beauchamp (red card) 18'; Zaza (yellow card) 41'	Report	Djiby Fall 7'; Djemba-Djemba (yellow card) 35', (goal) 57'; Runström (yellow card) 45'; Hansen (yellow card) 65'; Absalonsen 90'	Stadium: Energi Nord Arena; Attendance: 7,033; Referee: Thomas Vejlgaard

30 August 2008 6	Odense	2–1	Randers	Odense
17:00 CEST	Djiby Fall 19', (yellow card) 67'; Andreasen 40'; Absalonsen (yellow card) 83'; Djemba-Djemba (yellow card) 90'; Helveg (yellow card) 90'	Report	Arzumanyan (yellow card) 27'; Sane (yellow card) 36'; R. Pedersen (yellow card) 39'; S. Pedersen (yellow card) 39'; K. Pedersen 41', (yellow card) 71'; Frederiksen (yellow card) 55'	Stadium: Fionia Park; Attendance: 8,105; Referee: Emil Laursen

15 September 2008 7	Odense	2–0	SønderjyskE	Odense
19:00 CEST	Andreasen 82'; Utaka 90+1'	Report	Bødker (yellow card) 28'; Stolberg (yellow card) 38'	Stadium: Fionia Park; Attendance: 10,434; Referee: Lars Christoffersen

20 September 2008 8	Horsens	1–2	Odense	Horsens
17:00 CEST	Rasmussen (yellow card) 30'; Elanga 40'	Report	Djiby Fall (yellow card) 21', (goal) 27', 44'	Stadium: CASA Arena Horsens; Attendance: 3,755; Referee: Henning Jensen

5 October 2008 9	Odense	0–1	Brøndby	Odense
17:30 CEST	Djemba-Djemba (yellow card) 15' (yellow-red card) 56'	Report	von Schlebrügge (yellow card) 6'; Jallow 30'; Wass (yellow card) 46'; Rasmussen (yellow card) 52'	Stadium: Fionia Park; Attendance: 15,352; Referee: Anders Hermansen

19 October 2008 10	Odense	4–2	Esbjerg	Odense
16:05 CEST	Östlund 21' (o.g.); Runström 22'; Andreasen (yellow card) 50'; Absalonsen (yellow card) 75'; Utaka (yellow card) 79'; Djiby Fall 84', 90+2'	Report	Rieks 3'; Bech (yellow card) 16', (goal) 37'	Stadium: Fionia Park; Attendance: 10,629; Referee: Lars Christoffersen

26 October 2008 11	Copenhagen	0–0	Odense	Copenhagen
17:30 CEST		Report	Djemba-Djemba (yellow card) 40'; Andreasen (yellow card) 44'	Stadium: Parken Stadium; Attendance: 26,073; Referee: Nicolai Vollquartz

1 November 2008 12	Odense	1–1	Aalborg	Odense
17:00 CEST	Runström 39'; Andreasen (yellow card) 67'; Christensen (yellow card) 90+3'	Report	Augustinussen 53'; Jakobsen (yellow card) 55' (yellow-red card) 85'; Cacá (yellow card) 62'; Johansson (yellow card) 90+1'; Zaza (yellow card) 90+2'; Enevoldsen (yellow card) 90+3'	Stadium: Fionia Park; Attendance: 7,087; Referee: Jesper Bæk Overgaard

8 November 2008 13	Esbjerg	1–2	Odense	Esbjerg
17:00 CEST	Jørgensen 78'	Report	Andreasen 30'; Ruud 37'; Troest (yellow card) 76'	Stadium: Blue Water Arena; Attendance: 6,179; Referee: Michael Johansen

16 November 2008 14	Odense	2–0	Vejle	Odense
14:00 CEST	Andreasen 78'; Djemba-Djemba (yellow card) 84'; Absalonsen 86'	Report	Kielstrup (yellow card) 43'; Priske (yellow card) 58'	Stadium: Fionia Park; Attendance: 7,670; Referee: Nicolai Vollquartz

23 November 2008 15	Nordsjælland	1–4	Odense	Farum
16:05 CEST	Bernburg 29'; Kibebe (yellow card) 76'	Report	Runström 13', 41'; Absalonsen (yellow card) 72'; Andreasen 81'; Utaka 85'	Stadium: Farum Park; Attendance: 3,098; Referee: Henning Jensen

1 December 2008 16	Aarhus	2–1	Odense	Farum
19:00 CEST	Poulsen 16'; Rafael 89', (yellow card) 90'	Report	Djiby Fall (yellow card) 72'; Utaka 58'; Andreasen (yellow card) 84'	Stadium: Farum Park; Attendance: 10,421; Referee: Emil Laursen

6 December 2008 17	Odense	0–1	Brøndby	Odense
17:00 CEST	Djiby Fall (yellow card) 13'; Hansen (yellow card) 17'; Helveg (yellow card) 72'	Report	Jallow 32'	Stadium: Fionia Park; Attendance: 10,031; Referee: Anders Hermansen

1 March 2009 18	Odense	2–0	SønderjyskE	Odense
14:00 CEST	Djiby Fall 2'; Ruud 64'	Report	Halle (yellow card) 60'	Stadium: Fionia Park; Attendance: 7,367; Referee: Henning Jensen

8 March 2009 19	Horsens	2–1	Odense	Horsens
14:00 CEST	Rieper (yellow card) 36'; Berisha 50', 88', (yellow card) 59'; Nøhr (yellow card) 77'	Report	Demba-Nyrén (yellow card) 28'; Djiby Fall 72'	Stadium: CASA Arena Horsens; Attendance: 3,720; Referee: Lars Christoffersen

14 March 2009 20	Odense	2–1	Midtjylland	Odense
17:00 CEST	Utaka 22'; Helveg (yellow card) 29'; Absalonsen (yellow card) 35'; Sørensen 44'	Report	Olsen (yellow card) 77'; Borring 51'; Afriyie (yellow card) 60'	Stadium: Fionia Park; Attendance: 6,652; Referee: Thomas Vejlgaard

22 March 2009 21	Copenhagen	2–1	Odense	Copenhagen
17:30 CEST	Kvist (yellow card) 7'; Hutchinson 50'; Nordstrand 83'; Jørgensen (yellow card) 90+5'	Report	Hansen (yellow card) 77'; Ruud 47'; Djemba-Djemba (yellow card) 77'; Absalonsen (yellow card) 90'	Stadium: Parken Stadium

6 April 2009 22	Odense	3–1	Randers	Odense
19:00 CEST	Utaka 23'; Hansen 47'; Demba-Nyrén 86'	Report	Nygaard 60'; Berg (yellow card) 64'	Stadium: Fionia Park; Attendance: 10,193; Referee: Michael Svendsen

9 April 2009 23	Odense	2–1	Esbjerg	Odense
14:00 CEST	Helveg (yellow card) 13'; Sørensen 26' (pen.); Andreasen 83'; Onyszko (yellow card) 90'	Report	Jørgensen 13' (pen.), (yellow card) 51'; Klarström (yellow card) 26'	Stadium: Fionia Park; Attendance: 9,562; Referee: Anders Hermansen

12 April 2009 24	Aalborg	0–1	Odense	Aalborg
15:00 CEST	Shelton (yellow card) 79'	Report	Andreasen 34'; Christensen (yellow card) 60'	Stadium: Energi Nord Arena; Attendance: Energi Nord Arena; Referee: Henrik Kragh

19 April 2009 25	Odense	3–0	Nordsjælland	Odense
16:05 CEST	Absalonsen 2'; Utaka 53', 63'; Ruud (yellow card) 78'	Report	Christensen (yellow card) 27'; Bernier (yellow card) 56'; Cagara (yellow card) 74' (yellow-red card) 79'	Stadium: Fionia Park; Attendance: 10,380; Referee: Emil Laursen

23 April 2009 26	Vejle	0–5	Odense	Vejle
20:00 CEST		Report	Ruud 35'; Utaka 61', 83'; Andreasen 65'; Demba-Nyrén 68'	Stadium: Vejle Stadion; Attendance: 6,611; Referee: Jesper Overgaard

26 April 2009 27	Brøndby	0–0	Odense	Brøndby
17:30 CEST	van der Schaaf (yellow card) 28'; Gíslason (yellow card) 56'; Kristiansen (yellow card) 73'	Report	Christensen (yellow card) 2'	Stadium: Brøndby Stadion; Attendance: 20,623; Referee: Henrik Kragh

4 May 2009 28	Odense	6–1	Aarhus	Odense
19:00 CEST	Utaka 15', 20'; Demba-Nyrén 30', 56'; Helveg (yellow card) 44'; Andreasen 57'; Runström 79'	Report	Poulsen 38' (pen.); Budtz (yellow card) 80'; Blicher (yellow card) 86'	Stadium: Fionia Park; Attendance: 12,732; Referee: Henrik Priegel

10 May 2009 29	Randers	0–0	Odense	Randers
16:15 CEST	Olsen (yellow card) 30'	Report		Stadium: AutoC Park Randers

13 May 2009 30	Odense	3–2	Copenhagen	Odense
20:00 CEST	Demba-Nyrén 18', 54'; Helveg (yellow card) 30'; Hansen 37'	Report	Aílton 47', (yellow card) 62'; Vingaard 83'; N'Doye (yellow card) 86'	Stadium: Fionia Park; Attendance: 15,486; Referee: Anders Hermansen

16 May 2009 31	SønderjyskE	1–1	Odense	Haderslev
17:00 CEST	Ottesen 90+2'	Report	Utaka 10'; Absalonsen (yellow card) 57'	Stadium: Haderslev Fodboldstadion; Attendance: 2,746; Referee: Michael Johansen

24 May 2009 32	Midtjylland	1–1	Odense	Herning
17:00 CEST	Nworuh 30'	Report	Ruud (yellow card) 12'; Andreasen (yellow card) 45'; Demba-Nyrén 73'; Absalonsen (yellow card) 81'	Stadium: MCH Arena; Attendance: 7,710; Referee: Michael Svendsen

31 May 2009 33	Odense	2–1	Horsens	Odense
17:00 CEST	Djemba-Djemba 27'; Demba-Nyrén 37'; Helveg (yellow card) 45'; Onyszko (yellow card) 87'; Absalonsen (yellow card) 90'	Report	Augustsson (yellow card) 8' (yellow-red card) 89', (goal) 61'; Rasmussen (yellow card) 40'	Stadium: Fionia Park; Attendance: 12,698; Referee: Lars Christoffersen

=== UEFA Intertoto Cup ===
==== Second round ====
6 July 2008 First leg	TPS Turku (Finland)	1–2	(Denmark) Odense	Turku
17:30 CEST	One 38', (yellow card) 81'; Heinikangas (yellow card) 69'; Zarabi (yellow card) 83'	Report	Djiby Fall 5'; Sørensen 84'	Stadium: Veritas Stadium; Attendance: 2,400; Referee: Andrejs Sipailo (Latvia)

13 July 2008 Second leg	Odense (Denmark)	2–0	(Finland) TPS Turku	Odense
18:00 CEST	Djiby Fall 21', 51', (yellow card) 43'	Report	Perot (yellow card) 40'	Stadium: Fionia Park; Attendance: 4,034; Referee: Igor Zakharov (Russia)

Odense won 4–1 on aggregate

==== Third round ====
19 July 2008 First leg	Odense (Denmark)	2–2	(England) Aston Villa	Odense
20:00 CEST	Sidwell 25' (o.g.); Christensen (yellow card) 85', (goal) 89'	Report	Carew 7'; Carew (yellow card) 29'; Young (yellow card) 32'; Laursen 76'	Stadium: Fionia Park; Attendance: 11,393; Referee: Andrea De Marco (Italy)

26 July 2008 Second leg	Aston Villa (England)	1–0	(Denmark) Odense	Birmingham
20:00 CEST	Young 51'	Report	Absalonsen (yellow card) 57'	Stadium: Villa Park; Attendance: 31,423; Referee: Cüneyt Çakır (Turkey)

Aston Villa won 3–2 on aggregate

=== Ekstra Bladet Cup ===
28 September 2008 Third round	FC Amager	1–3	Odense	Copenhagen
15:00 CEST	Nielsen (yellow card) 18', (goal) 67'	Report	Hansen (yellow card) 10'; Utaka 37'; Djiby Fall 66'; Ruud 81'	Stadium: Sundby Idrætspark; Attendance: 1,449; Referee: Jesper Bæk Overggard

29 October 2008 Fourth round	Odense	1–0	Aarhus	Odense
20:15 CEST	Hansen (yellow card) 58'; Absalonsen 88'	Report		Stadium: Fionia Park; Attendance: 4,942; Referee: Henning Jensen

12 November 2008 Quarter-final	Odense	0–1	Brøndby	Odense
20:00 CEST	Helveg (yellow card) 31'	Report	Rasmussen (yellow card) 31'; Farnerud 88'; Krohn-Dehli (yellow card) 90'	Stadium: Fionia Park; Attendance: 6,537; Referee: Michael Svendsen

== Squad statistics ==
=== Goalscorers ===
Includes all competitive matches. The list is sorted by shirt number when total goals are equal.

As of match played 31 May 2009

Rank	Pos.	No.	Player	Superliga	Ekstra Bladet Cup	Intertoto Cup	Total
1	FW	7	Peter Utaka	12	1	0	13
2	FW	—	Baye Djiby Fall	11	1	0	12
3	MF	4	Hans Henrik Andreasen	9	0	0	9
4	FW	22	Njogu Demba-Nyrén	8	0	0	8
5	FW	10	Björn Runström	7	0	0	7
6	MF	11	Johan Absalonsen	5	1	0	6
7	DF	2	Espen Ruud	4	1	0	5
8	MF	8	Henrik Hansen	3	0	0	3
8	DF	15	Chris Sørensen	3	0	0	3
10	MF	19	Eric Djemba-Djemba	2	0	0	2
11	DF	5	Anders Møller Christensen	0	0	1	1
Own goals				1	0	1	2
TOTALS				65	4	2	71
