= 2009–10 Odense Boldklub season =

Odense
2009–10 season
- Chairman: Niels Thorborg
- Manager: Lars Olsen
- Stadium: Fionia Park
- Danish Superliga: 2nd
- Danish Cup: Semi-finals
- UEFA Europa League: Play-off round
| Home colours | Away colours |

The 2009–10 Odense Boldklub season was the club's 122nd season, and their 49th appearance in the Danish Superliga. In addition to the domestic league, Odense participated in this season's editions of the Danish Cup and the UEFA Europa League.

== First team ==
Last updated on 31 May 2010

| Squad no. | Name | Nationality | Position | Date of birth (age) |
Goalkeepers
| 1 | Roy Carroll | (Northern Ireland) | GK | 30 September 1977 (aged 32) |
| 30 | Alexander Lund Hansen | (Norway) | GK | 6 October 1982 (aged 27) |
| 35 | Christian Kier | (Denmark) | GK | 17 May 1988 (aged 22) |
Defenders
| 2 | Espen Ruud | (Norway) | RB | 26 February 1984 (aged 26) |
| 3 | Atle Roar Håland | (Norway) | CB | 26 July 1977 (aged 32) |
| 5 | Anders Møller Christensen | (Denmark) | CB | 26 July 1977 (aged 32) |
| 6 | Thomas Helveg | (Denmark) | RB/CB | 24 January 1971 (aged 39) |
| 15 | Chris Sørensen (captain) | (Denmark) | LB/CB | 27 July 1977 (aged 32) |
| 18 | Jonas Troest | (Denmark) | CB | 4 March 1985 (aged 25) |
| 20 | Timmi Johansen | (Denmark) | LB | 8 May 1987 (aged 23) |
| 23 | Mads Greve | (Denmark) | CB | 12 September 1989 (aged 20) |
Midfielders
| 4 | Hans Henrik Andreasen | (Denmark) | CM/RM | 10 January 1979 (aged 31) |
| 8 | Henrik Hansen | (Denmark) | CM/AM | 28 July 1979 (aged 30) |
| 11 | Johan Absalonsen | (Denmark) | LM/LW | 16 September 1985 (aged 24) |
| 14 | Esben Hansen | (Denmark) | CM/DM | 10 August 1981 (aged 28) |
| 17 | Cacá | (Brazil) | AM | 9 October 1982 (aged 27) |
| 19 | Eric Djemba-Djemba | (Cameroon) | DM | 4 May 1981 (aged 29) |
| 21 | Rúrik Gíslason | (Iceland) | RM/RW | 25 February 1988 (aged 22) |
| 25 | Oliver Feldballe | (Denmark) | LM/AM | 3 April 1990 (aged 20) |
Forwards
| 7 | Peter Utaka | (Nigeria) | ST | 12 February 1984 (aged 26) |
| 22 | Njogu Demba-Nyrén | (The Gambia) | ST | 26 June 1979 (aged 30) |
| 28 | Anders K. Jacobsen | (Denmark) | ST | 27 October 1989 (aged 20) |

== Transfers and loans ==
=== Transfers in ===
| Entry date | Position | No. | Player | From club | Fee | Ref. |
|---|---|---|---|---|---|---|
| 30 June 2009 | GK | | (Denmark) Anders Lindegaard | (Norway) Aalesund | Back from loan | |
| 30 June 2009 | MF | | (Denmark) Matti Lund Nielsen | (Denmark) Lyngby BK | Back from loan | |
| 1 July 2009 | MF | 25 | (Denmark) Oliver Feldballe | Youth academy | | |
| 1 July 2009 | DF | 20 | (Denmark) Timmi Johansen | (Netherlands) Heerenveen | Free transfer | |
| 1 July 2009 | GK | 16 | (Denmark) Emil Ousager | (Denmark) Randers FC | Free transfer | |
| 6 July 2009 | MF | 17 | (Brazil) Cacá | (Denmark) Aalborg BK | | |
| 14 July 2009 | MF | 21 | (Iceland) Rúrik Gíslason | (Denmark) Viborg FF | | |
| 16 August 2009 | GK | 30 | (Northern Ireland) Roy Carroll | (England) Derby County | Free transfer | |
| 1 January 2010 | GK | | (Norway) Alexander Lund Hansen | (Norway) Rosenborg | Free transfer | |
| 1 August 2009 | GK | 16 | (Denmark) Rune Pedersen | (Denmark) Lyngby BK | Loan | |
| 31 December 2009 | MF | 14 | (Denmark) Esben Hansen | (Denmark) Randers FC | Back from loan | |
| 1 January 2010 | DF | | (Denmark) Mads Greve | Youth academy | Back from loan | |
| Total | | | | | | |

== Competitions ==
=== Superliga ===
==== Results summary ====
| Overall | | | | | | | | Home | | | | | | Away | | | | | |
| Pld | W | D | L | GF | GA | GD | Pts | W | D | L | GF | GA | GD | W | D | L | GF | GA | GD |
|---|---|---|---|---|---|---|---|---|---|---|---|---|---|---|---|---|---|---|---|
| 33 | 17 | 8 | 8 | 46 | 34 | +12 | 59 | 9 | 4 | 4 | 20 | 14 | +6 | 8 | 4 | 4 | 26 | 20 | +6 |

Last updated: 16 May 2010.
Source: Worldfootball.net

==== Result by round ====
| Matchday | 1 | 2 | 3 | 4 | 5 | 6 | 7 | 8 | 9 | 10 | 11 | 12 | 13 | 14 | 15 | 16 | 17 | 18 | 19 | 20 | 21 | 22 | 23 | 24 | 25 | 26 | 27 | 28 | 29 | 30 | 31 | 32 | 33 |
|---|---|---|---|---|---|---|---|---|---|---|---|---|---|---|---|---|---|---|---|---|---|---|---|---|---|---|---|---|---|---|---|---|---|
| Ground | A | H | A | A | H | H | A | H | A | H | H | A | A | H | A | A | H | H | A | H | H | A | H | A | H | H | A | A | H | A | H | H | A |
| Result | D | W | D | W | W | W | L | D | W | W | W | W | D | D | W | W | W | L | D | D | W | W | L | L | D | L | L | W | W | L | W | L | W |
| Position | 4 | 3 | 4 | 3 | 3 | 1 | 4 | 4 | 3 | 2 | 1 | 1 | 1 | 1 | 1 | 1 | 1 | 1 | 2 | 2 | 2 | 2 | 2 | 2 | 2 | 2 | 2 | 2 | 2 | 2 | 2 | 2 | 2 |

Updated to match(es) played on 16 May 2010. Source: Worldfootball.net
A = Away; H = Home; W = Win; D = Draw; L = Loss

==== Matches ====
| 19 July 2009 1 | Brøndby | 2–2 | Odense | Copenhagen |
| 17:00 CEST | Jallow (yellow card) 22', (goal) 39' (pen.); Jönsson 66', (yellow card) 88' | Report | Djemba-Djemba (yellow card) 17'; Hansen (yellow card) 40'; Sørensen 41' (pen.); Demba-Nyrén 56' | Stadium: Brøndby Stadium; Attendance: 12,559; Referee: Anders Hermansen |

| 25 July 2009 2 | Odense | 3–1 | SønderjyskE | Odense |
| 16:00 CEST | Absalonsen 12'; Håland 34'; Utaka 61' | Report | Frederiksen 17'; Hansen (yellow card) 32'; Christensen (yellow card) 53'; Bertolt (yellow card) 69' | Stadium: Fionia Park; Attendance: 6,773; Referee: Nicolai Vollquartz |

=== UEFA Europa League ===
==== Qualifying rounds ====
===== Third qualifying round =====
| 30 July 2009 First leg | Rabotnički (North Macedonia) | 3–4 | (Denmark) Odense | Skopje, Macedonia |
| 17:00 CEST (UTC+2) | Savić 21'; Wandeir 24', (yellow card) 48'; Sekulovski (yellow card) 41'; Todorovski (yellow card) 61'; Zé Carlos 74'; Gligorov (yellow card) 75' | Report | Cacá 20', 34', 70'; H. Hansen (yellow card) 44'; Sørensen 62' (pen.) | Stadium: Philip II Arena; Attendance: 2,500; Referee: Vladislav Bezborodov (Russia) |

| 6 August 2009 Second leg | Odense (Denmark) | 3–0 (7–3 agg.) | (North Macedonia) Rabotnički | Odense, Denmark |
| 20:05 CEST (UTC+2) | Absalonsen (yellow card) 34'; Utaka (yellow card) 39', (goal) 53', 76'; Rodić 81' (o.g.) | Report | Naumovski (yellow card) 5' | Stadium: Fionia Park; Attendance: 6,495; Referee: Hannes Kaasik (Estonia) |
Note: Odense won 7–3 on aggregate.

==== Play-off round ====
| 20 August 2009 First leg | Genoa (Italy) | 3–1 | (Denmark) Odense | Genoa, Italy |
| 20:45 CEST (UTC+2) | Sørensen 9' (o.g.); Biava (yellow card) 17'; Bocchetti (yellow card) 45'; Figueroa 48', 56' | Report | Helveg (yellow card) 12'; Christensen (yellow card) 55'; Mesto 59' (o.g.); Sørensen (yellow card) 64'; Utaka (yellow card) 85'; Djemba-Djemba (yellow card) 90+2' | Stadium: Stadio Luigi Ferraris; Attendance: 21,889; Referee: Stéphane Lannoy (France) |

| 27 August 2009 Second leg | Odense (Denmark) | 1–1 (2–4 agg.) | (Italy) Genoa | Odense, Denmark |
| 20:30 CEST (UTC+2) | Djemba-Djemba (yellow card) 11'; Cacá (yellow card) 39'; Figueroa 45+2' (o.g.) | Report | Biava (yellow card) 45+3'; Criscito 53'; Papastathopoulos (yellow card) 77' | Stadium: Fionia Park; Attendance: 10,001; Referee: Björn Kuipers (Netherlands) |
Note: Genoa won 4–2 on aggregate.
