= List of Odense Boldklub seasons =

Odense Boldklub is a Danish association football club based in Odense, Denmark. The club was formed in 1887 as a cricket club.

== Key ==
- Superliga = Danish Superliga
- Division 1 = Danish 1st Division
- Division 2 = Danish 2nd Division
- P = Games played
- W = Games won
- D = Games drawn
- L = Games lost
- F = Goals for
- A = Goals against
- Pts = Points
- Pos = Final position
- ITC3 = Third Intertoto Cup Round
- QR2 = Second Qualifying Round
- QR3 = Third Qualifying Round
- PO = Play-off
- GS = Group stage
- R1 = Round 1
- R2 = Round 2
- R3 = Round 3
- R4 = Round 4
- QF = Quarter-finals
- SF = Semi-finals

Champions	Runners-up	Promoted ↑	Relegated ↓	Top scorer in Odense's division ♦

== Seasons ==
Correct as of the end of the 2018–19 season.

Seasons of Odense Boldklub
Season	League									Cup	CL	EL	CWC	Topscorer	
Season	Division	P	W	D	L	F	A	Pts	Pos	Cup	CL	EL	CWC	Name	Goals
1945–46	Division 3 ↑	—	—	—	—	—	—	—	1st	—	—	—	—	—	—
1977	Division 1	30	19	9	2	66	27	47	1st	—	—	—	—	—	—
1978	Division 1	30	15	8	7	63	39	38	4th	—	—	—	—	—	—
1979	Division 1	30	15	7	8	53	40	37	5th	—	—	—	—	John Eriksen	22 ♦
1978	Division 1	30	15	8	7	63	39	38	4th	—	—	—	—	—	—
1980	Division 1	30	14	10	6	45	31	38	3rd	—	—	—	—	—	—
1981	Division 1	30	13	6	11	53	40	32	6th	—	—	—	—	Allan Hansen	28 ♦
1982	Division 1	30	18	5	7	51	28	41	1st	—	—	—	—	Vilhelm Munk Nielsen	16
1983	Division 1	30	16	6	8	47	41	38	2nd	—	R1	—	—	Vilhelm Munk Nielsen	20 ♦
1984	Division 1	30	10	8	12	47	40	28	9th	—	—	R1	—	—	—
1985	Division 1	30	15	5	10	52	43	35	4th	—	—	—	—	—	—
1986	Division 1	26	10	6	10	38	32	26	8th	—	—	—	—	—	—
1987	Division 1	26	12	7	7	39	26	31	4th	—	—	—	—	—	—
1988	Division 1	26	12	5	9	47	36	29	6th	—	—	—	—	—	—
1989	Division 1	26	17	7	2	45	19	41	1st	—	—	—	—	Lars Jakobsen	14 ♦
1990	Division 1	26	9	9	8	32	28	27	8th	—	R1	—	—	—	—
1991	Superliga	18	3	11	4	21	20	17	5th	—	—	—	—	Johnny Hansen	4
1991–92	Superliga	18	4	3	11	28	49	11	10th	—	—	—	R1	Lars Elstrup	12
1992–93	Superliga	32	18	6	8	50	32	42	2nd	—	—	—	—	Lars Elstrup	12
1993–94	Superliga	32	14	11	7	44	32	51	4th	R5	—	—	R1	Alphonse Tchami	11
1994–95	Superliga	32	14	7	12	48	47	45	8th	SF	—	QF	—	Michael Schjønberg; Alphonse Tchami	9
1995–96	Superliga	33	17	9	7	57	33	60	3rd	SF	—	—	—	Per Pedersen	16
1996–97	Superliga	33	11	8	14	59	61	41	7th	QF	—	R1	—	Morten Bisgaard	16
1997–98	Superliga ↓	33	6	7	20	40	57	25	12th	RF	—	—	—	Morten Bisgaard	8
1998–99	Division 1 ↑	30	24	2	4	81	24	57	1st	QF	—	—	—	Mwape Miti	21 ♦
1999–00	Superliga	33	11	10	12	42	43	46	9th	R5	—	—	—	Søren Andersen	14
2000–01	Superliga	33	13	7	13	49	45	46	7th	R5	—	—	—	Søren Andersen	10
2001–02	Superliga	33	13	10	10	56	51	49	6th	W	—	—	—	Kasper Dalgas	22 ♦
2002–03	Superliga	33	12	12	9	55	50	48	4th	R5	—	R1	—	Mwape Miti	13
2003–04	Superliga	33	12	12	9	55	50	48	4th	SF	—	R1	—	Mwape Miti	22 ♦
2004–05	Superliga	33	13	9	11	61	41	48	6th	R5	—	—	—	Steffen Højer	20 ♦
2005–06	Superliga	33	17	7	9	49	28	58	3rd	QF	—	—	—	José Junior	9
2006–07	Superliga	33	17	7	9	45	36	58	4th	W	—	GS	—	Bechara	9
2007–08	Superliga	33	12	16	5	46	27	52	4th	R4	—	R1	—	Hans Henrik Andreasen	8
2008–09	Superliga	33	21	6	6	65	31	69	2nd	QF	—	ITC3	—	Baye Djiby Fall	15
2009–10	Superliga	33	17	8	8	46	34	59	2nd	R4	—	QR3	—	Peter Utaka	27 ♦
2010–11	Superliga	33	16	7	10	55	41	55	2nd	R4	—	GS	—	Peter Utaka	20
2011–12	Superliga	33	8	10	15	46	50	34	10th	R3	PO	GS	—	Peter Utaka	9
2012–13	Superliga	33	10	8	15	52	59	38	10th	QF	—	—	—	Marcus Pedersen	11
2013–14	Superliga	33	10	10	13	47	46	40	8th	R4	—	—	—	Mustafa Abdellaoue	13
2014–15	Superliga	33	10	10	13	47	46	40	8th	R2	—	—	—	Rasmus Falk; Martin Spelmann	5
2015–16	Superliga	33	14	4	15	50	52	46	7th	R3	—	—	—	Rasmus Festersen	16
2016–17	Superliga	32	10	9	13	33	38	39	11th	R3	—	—	—	Rasmus Jönsson	10
2017–18	Superliga	32	11	9	12	43	37	42	10th	R4	—	—	—	Anders K. Jacobsen	15
2018–19	Superliga	36	14	10	12	48	48	52	5th	SF	—	—	—	Bashkim Kadrii	11
Season	Division	P	W	D	L	F	A	Pts	Pos	Cup	CL	EL	CWC	Name	Goals
