= 2011–12 Odense Boldklub season =

Odense BK
2011–12 season
- Chairman: Niels Thorborg
- Manager: Henrik Clausen
- Stadium: TRE-FOR Park
- Danish Superliga: 10th
- Danish Cup: Third round
- UEFA Champions League: Play-off round
- UEFA Europa League: Group stage
- Top goalscorer: League: Peter Utaka (8 goals); All: Peter Utaka (9 goals)
Home colours	Away colours

The 2011–12 Odense Boldklub season was the club's 124th season, and their 51st appearance in the Danish Superliga. As well as the Superliga, they competed in the Danish Cup, UEFA Champions League and UEFA Europa League.

== First team ==
Last updated on 1 May 2012

Squad no.	Name	Nationality	Position	Date of birth (age)
Goalkeepers
1	Jesper Christiansen	(Denmark)	GK	24 April 1978 (aged 34)
17	Mads Toppel	(Denmark)	GK	28 January 1982 (aged 30)
30	Daniel Krog	(Denmark)	GK	14 March 1991 (aged 21)
33	Stefan Wessels	(Germany)	GK	28 February 1979 (aged 33)
Defenders
2	Espen Ruud	(Norway)	RB	26 February 1984 (aged 28)
5	Anders Møller Christensen	(Denmark)	CB	26 July 1977 (aged 34)
8	Tore Reginiussen	(Norway)	CB	10 April 1986 (aged 26)
15	Kasper Larsen	(Denmark)	CB	25 January 1993 (aged 19)
20	Timmi Johansen	(Denmark)	LB	8 May 1987 (aged 25)
22	Bernard Mendy	(France)	RB/LB	20 August 1981 (aged 30)
23	Oliver Larsen	(Denmark)	CB	12 November 1991 (aged 20)
26	Daniel Høegh	(Denmark)	CB	6 January 1991 (aged 21)
Midfielders
4	Hans Henrik Andreasen	(Denmark)	CM/AM	10 January 1979 (aged 33)
10	Andreas Johansson	(Sweden)	CM/AM	5 July 1987 (aged 24)
16	Jacob Schoop	(Denmark)	CM	23 December 1988 (aged 23)
18	Kalilou Traoré	(Mali)	DM/CM	9 September 1987 (aged 24)
19	Eric Djemba-Djemba	(Cameroon)	DM	4 May 1981 (aged 31)
21	Rúrik Gíslason	(Iceland)	RM/RW	25 February 1988 (aged 24)
24	Bashkim Kadrii	(Denmark)	LM/LW/ST	9 July 1991 (aged 20)
25	Christian Sørensen	(Denmark)	LM/LW	6 August 1992 (aged 19)
Forwards
9	Rasmus Falk	(Denmark)	RW/AM/ST	15 January 1992 (aged 20)
11	Morten Skoubo	(Denmark)	ST	30 June 1980 (aged 31)
14	Hannes Anier	(Estonia)	ST	16 January 1993 (aged 19)

== Transfers and loans ==
=== Transfers in ===
Entry date	Position	No.	Player	From club	Fee	Ref.
30 June 2011	DF	20	(Denmark) Timmi Johansen	(Denmark) Viborg	Back from loan	
30 June 2011	DF	–	(Denmark) Jonas Troest	(Denmark) SønderjyskE	Back from loan	
1 July 2011	MF	25	(Denmark) Christian Sørensen	Youth academy	None	
1 July 2011	DF	23	(Denmark) Oliver Larsen	Youth academy	None	
1 July 2011	DF	8	(Norway) Tore Reginiussen	(Germany) Schalke 04	3,000,000 DKK	
1 July 2011	FW	11	(Denmark) Morten Skoubo	(Netherlands) FC Utrecht	Free transfer	
2 July 2011	GK	30	(Denmark) Daniel Krog	(Denmark) Otterup B&IK		
7 July 2011	MF	16	(Denmark) Jacob Schoop	(Denmark) FC Fyn	Free transfer	
18 August 2011	DF	15	(Denmark) Kasper Larsen	Youth academy	None	
1 September 2011	FW	99	(Senegal) Baye Djiby Fall	(Russia) Lokomotiv Moscow	Loan	
17 January 2012	GK	1	(Denmark) Jesper Christiansen	(Sweden) IF Elfsborg	4,200,000 DKK	
15 March 2012	FW	14	(Estonia) Hannes Anier	(Estonia) FC Flora	Free transfer	
Total					7,200,000 DKK	

=== Transfers out ===
Departure date	Position	No.	Player	To club	Fee	Ref.
1 July 2011	DF	3	(Norway) Atle Roar Håland	(Denmark) Aarhus GF		
20 January 2012	FW	7	(Nigeria) Peter Utaka	(China) Dalian Yifang	4,000,000 DKK	
	DF	14	(Denmark) Jonas Troest	(Denmark) SønderjyskE	Free transfer	
	MF	25	(Denmark) Oliver Feldballe	(Denmark) Randers FC		
	DF	15	(Denmark) Chris Sørensen	(Denmark) Randers FC		
	FW	13	(Denmark) Henrik Toft	(Denmark) AC Horsens		
Total						

== Competitions ==
=== Overall ===
Competition	Started round	Current position / round	Final position / round	First match	Last match
Superliga	—	—	10th	16 July 2011	23 May 2012
Danish Cup	Third round	—	Third round	22 September 2011	22 September 2011
UEFA Champions League	Third round	—	Play-off round	27 July 2011	23 August 2011
UEFA Europa League	Group stage	—	Group stage	15 September 2011	14 December 2011

Updated to match played 23 May 2012
Source: Competitions

=== Overview ===
Competition	Record							
Competition	G	W	D	L	GF	GA	GD	Win %
Superliga	33	8	10	15	46	50	−4	24.24
Danish Cup	1	0	0	1	0	1	−1	0.00
UEFA Champions League	4	2	1	1	6	7	−1	50.00
UEFA Europa League	6	1	1	4	9	14	−5	16.67
Total	44	11	12	21	61	72	−11	25.00

Updated to match played 23 May 2012
Source: Competitions

=== Superliga ===
==== Results summary ====
Overall								Home						Away					
Pld	W	D	L	GF	GA	GD	Pts	W	D	L	GF	GA	GD	W	D	L	GF	GA	GD
33	8	10	15	46	50	−4	34	5	3	9	26	30	−4	3	7	6	20	20	0

Last updated: 31 May 2012.
Source: worldfootball.net

==== Result by round ====
Matchday	1	2	3	4	5	6
Ground	H	A	A	H	A	H
Result	W	D	D	W	L	W
Position	2	2	4	3	4	3

Updated to match(es) played on 31 May 2012. Source: worldfootball.net
A = Away; H = Home; W = Win; D = Draw; L = Loss

==== League table ====
Pos	Team	Pld	W	D	L	GF	GA	GD	Pts	Qualification or relegation
8	Silkeborg IF	33	11	10	12	51	47	+4	43	
9	Brøndby	33	9	9	15	35	46	−11	36	
10	OB	33	8	10	15	46	50	−4	34	
11	Lyngby Boldklub (Note: Lyngby Boldklub were originally deducted 3 points on 22 September 2011 for failing to have had the contract of former player Lasse Rise approved by the Danish FA, however they appealed the verdict and were returned the 3 points on 19 October 2011) (R)	33	8	4	21	32	60	−28	28	Relegation to Danish 1st Division
12	HB Køge (R)	33	4	7	22	32	71	−39	19	Relegation to Danish 1st Division

Source: Danish Football Association
Rules for classification: 1) points; 2) goal difference; 3) number of goals scored.
(R) Relegated

==== Matches ====
16 July 2011 1	Odense	2–0	Nordsjælland	Odense
16:00 CEST	Andreasen 12', 56'; Johansson (yellow card) 42'	Report	Kildentoft (yellow card) 35'; King (yellow card) 65'	Stadium: TRE-FOR Park; Attendance: 6,945; Referee: Anders Hermansen

23 July 2011 2	Copenhagen	2–2	Odense	Copenhagen
18:00 CEST	Ottesen 18', 40'; Bengtsson (yellow card) 42'; Jørgensen (yellow card) 78'	Report	Mendy 14', (yellow card) 31'; Johansson (yellow card) 21'; Utaka 63'; Sørensen (yellow card) 73'	Stadium: Parken Stadium; Attendance: 14,774; Referee: Lars Christoffersen

30 July 2011 3	Aarhus	2–2	Odense	Aarhus
16:00 CEST	Eckersley (yellow card) 59'; Berg 70'; Povlsen (yellow card) 72'; Larsen 76'; Petersen (yellow card) 86'	Report	Kadrii 9'; Ruud (yellow card) 33'; Andreasen 49'	Stadium: NRGi Park; Attendance: 11,312; Referee: Henrik Kragh

7 August 2011 4	Odense	2–1	Brøndby	Odense
18:00 CEST	Mendy (yellow card) 19'; Kadrii 31'; Johansson 60'; Christensen (yellow card) 68'	Report	McGrath 6'; Krohn-Dehli (yellow card) 14'; Stenderup (yellow card) 44'; Randrup (yellow card) 56' (yellow-red card) 59'; Goodson (yellow card) 68'; Kristiansen (yellow card) 77'	Stadium: TRE-FOR Park; Attendance: 10,695; Referee: Michael Svendsen

13 August 2011 5	Aarhus	2–1	Odense	Aalborg
17:00 CEST	Augustinussen 65'; Rolfe 79'; Petersen (yellow card) 88'	Report	Djemba-Djemba (yellow card) 60'; Ruud 87'	Stadium: Energi Nord Arena; Attendance: 7,893; Referee: Henrik Jensen

20 August 2011 6	Odense	3–1	Lyngby	Odense
17:00 CEST	Chr. Sørensen 14'; Traoré 21'; Mendy 30'	Report	Bertolt (yellow card) 26'; Fetai 78' (pen.)	Stadium: TRE-FOR Park; Attendance: 6,611; Referee: Jakob Kehlet

=== UEFA Champions League ===
On 15 July 2011, Odense were drawn against Greek side Panathinaikos. They made it through to the play-offs, but were knocked out by La Liga side Villarreal and did not make the group stage.

Win Draw Loss

==== Third qualifying round ====
27 July 2011 First leg	Odense (Denmark)	1–1	(Greece) Panathinaikos	Odense, Denmark
20:00 CEST	Sørensen (yellow card) 41'; Djemba-Djemba (yellow card) 79'; Reginiussen 90'	Report	Leto 47'; Spyropoulos (yellow card) 87'	Stadium: Odense Stadium; Attendance: 10,055; Referee: Carlos Clos Gómez (Spain)

2 August 2011 Second leg	Panathinaikos (Greece)	3–4	(Denmark) Odense	Athens, Greece
20:45 CEST	Boumsong 35'; Toché 50'; Katsouranis (yellow card) 54'; Petropoulos 90+5'	Report	Johansson 12'; Ruud (yellow card) 21'; Mendy (yellow card) 24' (yellow-red card) 90+3'; Ruud 58'; Wessels (yellow card) 76'; Kadrii 80'; Kadrii (yellow card) 81'; Andreasen 88'	Stadium: Athens Olympic Stadium; Attendance: 25,460; Referee: Andre Marriner (England)

Odense won 5–4 on aggregate

==== Play-off round ====
17 August 2011 First leg	Odense (Denmark)	1–0	(Spain) Villarreal	Odense, Denmark
20:45 CEST	Gíslason (yellow card) 13'; Høegh (yellow card) 49'; Andreasen 84'; Johansson (yellow card) 89'	Report	Musacchio (yellow card) 13'; Valero (yellow card) 31'; Oriol (yellow card) 54'; Bruno (yellow card) 71'	Stadium: Odense Stadium; Attendance: 13,002; Referee: Damir Skomina (Slovenia)

23 August 2011 Second leg	Villarreal (Spain)	3–0	(Denmark) Odense	Villarreal, Spain
20:45 CEST	Musacchio (yellow card) 36'; Senna (yellow card) 41'; Rossi 50', 66'; Cani (yellow card) 60'; Camuñas (yellow card) 73'; Valero (red card) 76'; Marchena 82'; Rodríguez (yellow card) 87'	Report	Traoré (yellow card) 16'; Kadrii (yellow card) 18' (yellow-red card); Mendy (yellow card) 60'; Johansson (yellow card) 77'; Djemba-Djemba (yellow card) 78'	Stadium: El Madrigal; Attendance: 18,404; Referee: Craig Thomson (Spain)

Villarreal won 3–1 on aggregate

=== UEFA Europa League ===
Team	Pld	W	D	L	GF	GA	GD	Pts
(Netherlands) Twente	6	4	1	1	14	7	+7	13
(Poland) Wisła Kraków	6	3	0	3	8	13	−5	9
(England) Fulham	6	2	2	2	9	6	+3	8
(Denmark) Odense	6	1	1	4	9	14	−5	4

==== Group stage ====
15 September 2011 1	Wisła Kraków (Poland)	1–3	(Denmark) Odense	Kraków, Poland
21:05 CEST	Kirm 54'; Sobolewski (yellow card) 68'; Lamey (yellow card) 76'; Chávez (yellow card) 80'; Paljić (yellow card) 84'	Report	Johansson 36', (yellow card) 56'; Utaka 80'; Falk 90+2'	Stadium: Stadion Miejski im. Henryka Reymana; Attendance: 12,920; Referee: Sascha Kever (Switzerland)

29 September 2011 2	Odense (Denmark)	0–2	(England) Fulham	Odense, Denmark
19:00 CEST	Traoré (yellow card) 71' (yellow-red card)	Report	Johnson 36', 88'; Senderos (yellow card) 64'; Etuhu (yellow card) 85'	Stadium: TRE-FOR Park; Attendance: 7,969; Referee: Maksim Layushkin (Russia)

20 October 2011 3	Odense (Denmark)	1–4	(Netherlands) Twente	Odense, Denmark
19:00 CEST	Djemba-Djemba (yellow card) 41'; Djiby Fall 71'	Report	Brama 13'; Bajrami 31'; Tiendalli (yellow card) 45'; Chadli 65' de Jong 82'	Stadium: TRE-FOR Park; Attendance: 8,036; Referee: David Fernández (Spain)

3 November 2011 4	Twente (Netherlands)	3–2	(Denmark) Odense	Enschede, Netherlands
21:05 CEST	Høegh 35' (o.g.); Landzaat 37', (yellow card) 62'; Douglas (yellow card) 40'; Rosales (yellow card) 52'; Wisgerhof (yellow card) 77'; Fer 82'; Bajrami (yellow card) 87'	Report	Djiby Fall 11', 62'; Ruud (yellow card) 45'; Johansson (yellow card) 73'; Traoré (yellow card) 73'; Sørensen (yellow card) 88'	Stadium: De Grolsch Veste

1 December 2011 5	Odense (Denmark)	1–2	(Poland) Wisła Kraków	Odense, Denmark
19:00 CEST	Falk 51'; Sørensen (yellow card) 54'	Report	Dudu Biton 20'; Małecki 28', (yellow card) 29'; Chávez (yellow card) 54'	Stadium: TRE-FOR Park; Attendance: 5,824; Referee: Laurent Duhamel (France)

14 December 2011 6	Fulham (England)	2–2	(Denmark) Odense	London, England
21:05 CEST	Dempsey 27'; Frei 31'; Gecov (yellow card) 79'	Report	Andreasen 64'; Gíslason (yellow card) 67'; Reginiussen (yellow card) 74'; Djiby Fall 90+2'	Stadium: Craven Cottage; Attendance: 15,757; Referee: Alon Yefet (Israel)

== Squad statistics ==
=== Goalscorers ===
Includes all competitive matches. The list is sorted by shirt number when total goals are equal.

As of match played 23 May 2012

Rank	Pos.	No.	Player	Superliga	Champions League	Europa League	Total
1	FW	–	Peter Utaka	8	0	1	9
2	MF	4	Hans Henrik Andreasen	5	2	1	8
2	MF	24	Bashkim Kadrii	7	1	0	8
4	FW	9	Rasmus Falk	4	0	2	6
4	MF	10	Andreas Johansson	4	1	1	6
4	FW	–	Baye Djiby Fall	2	0	4	6
7	DF	2	Espen Ruud	3	1	0	4
8	DF	8	Tore Reginiussen	2	1	0	3
8	MF	18	Kalilou Traoré	3	0	0	3
10	FW	11	Morten Skoubo	2	0	0	2
10	DF	15	Chris Sørensen	2	0	0	2
10	DF	22	Bernard Mendy	2	0	0	2
13	MF	19	Eric Djemba-Djemba	1	0	0	1
13	MF	25	Christian Sørensen	1	0	0	1
TOTALS				46	6	9	61
