= Odense Boldklub in European football =

- Club: Odense Boldklub
- First entry: 1978–79 European Cup
- Latest entry: 2011–12 UEFA Europa League

This is the overview of Odense Boldklub's matches in European football.

== 2004–05 Intertoto Cup ==
- Intertoto Cup
- First Round
20 June 2004
15:00

Odense (Denmark)	0–0	(Northern Ireland) Ballymena United

Odense Atletikstadion, Odense
Attendance: 1,197
Referee: Prades Mengual

26 June 2004
16:00

Ballymena United (Northern Ireland)	0–7	(Denmark) Odense
		Miti 25', 62', 88'; Højer 33', 55'; Møller Pedersen 80'; Borre 82'

Ballymena Showgrounds, Ballymena
Attendance: 2,107
Referee: Egill Mar Markusson

Odense won 7–0 on aggregate.

- Second Round
3 July 2004
20:00

Odense (Denmark)	0–3	(Spain) Villarreal
		Anderson 66'; Cazorla 70'; Guayre 88'

Atletion, Aarhus
Attendance: 523
Referee: Mike Dean

10 July 2004
22:00

Villarreal (Spain)	2–0	(Denmark) Odense
José Mari 23'; Font 39'

Estadio El Madrigal, Villarreal
Attendance: 4,000
Referee: Wolfgang Sowa

Villarreal won 5–0 on aggregate.

== 2006–07 Intertoto Cup and UEFA Cup ==
- Intertoto Cup
- Second Round
2 July 2006
15:00

Odense (Denmark)	3–0	(Republic of Ireland) Shelbourne
Fevang 28', 42', 58'

Fionia Park, Odense
Attendance: 1,903
Referee: Tsvetan Georgiev

9 July 2006
16:00

Shelbourne (Republic of Ireland)	1–0	(Denmark) Odense
Ndo 33'

Tolka Park, Dublin
Attendance: 800
Referee: Dietmar Drabek

Odense won 3–1 on aggregate.

- Third Round
15 July 2006
18:00

Odense (Denmark)	1–0	(Scotland) Hibernian
Sørensen 33'

Fionia Park, Odense
Attendance: 2,341
Referee: Phillipe Kalt

22 July 2006
16:00

Hibernian (Scotland)	2–1	(Denmark) Odense
Jones 53'; Dalglish 79'		Grahn 50'

Easter Road, Edinburgh
Attendance: 10,640
Referee: Matteo Trefoloni

Odense won 2–2 on aggregate and away goal.

- UEFA Cup
- Second qualification round
10 August 2006
19:00

Odense (Denmark)	1–0	(Wales) Llanelli
Bechara 29'

Fiona Park, Odense
Attendance: 2,744
Referee: Eigil Magnus Kristinsson

24 August 2006
20:45

Llanelli (Wales)	1–5	(Denmark) Odense
McCabe 10'		Timm 15'; Hansen 30'; Sørensen 59'; Ophaug 65'; Bechara 90'

Liberty Stadium, Swansea
Attendance: 2,759
Referee: Dejan Delević

Odense won 6–1 on aggregate.

- First round
14 September 2006
17:00

Hertha BSC (Germany)	2–2	(Denmark) Odense
Giménez 38'; Boateng 50'		Šimunić 7' (o.g.); Bechara 52'

Olympic Stadium, Berlin
Attendance: 12,814
Referee: Viktor Kassai

28 September 2006
15:30

Odense (Denmark)	1–0	(Germany) Hertha BSC
Timm 63'

Fionia Park, Odense
Attendance: 11,462
Referee: Iain Robertson

Odense won 3–2 on aggregate.

- Group Stage

Group D

Team	Pld	W	D	L	GF	GA	GD	Pts
(Italy) Parma	4	3	0	1	6	6	0	9
(Spain) Osasuna	4	2	1	1	7	4	3	7
(France) Lens	4	1	1	2	5	5	0	4
(Denmark) Odense	4	1	1	2	5	6	−1	4
(Netherlands) Heerenveen	4	1	1	2	2	4	−2	4

19 October 2006
20:45

Odense (Denmark)	1–2	(Italy) Parma
Hansen 7'		Dessena 39'; Budan 51'

Fiona Park, Odense
Attendance: 12,559
Referee: Serge Gumienny

2 November 2006
18:45

Heerenveen (Netherlands)	0–2	(Denmark) Odense
		Lekić 45', 59'

Abe Lenstra Stadion, Heerenveen
Attendance: 20,000
Referee: Tony Asumaa

23 November 2006
20:45

Odense (Denmark)	1–1	(France) Lens
Grahn 58'		Jemâa 87'

Fiona Park, Odense
Attendance: 7,707
Referee: Alon Yefet

29 November 2006
20:45

Osasuna (Spain)	3–1	(Denmark) Odense
Puñal 28', 65'; Romeo 85'		Puñal 73' (o.g.)

Estadio Reyno de Navarra, Pamplona
Attendance: 13,115
Referee: Peter Sippel

== 2007–08 UEFA Cup ==
- First qualification round
19 July 2007
20:45

St Patrick's Athletic (Republic of Ireland)	0–0	(Denmark) Odense
	Report

Richmond Park, Dublin
Attendance: 2,800
Referee: Fredy Fautrel (France)
2 August 2007
20:05

Odense (Denmark)	5–0	(Republic of Ireland) St Patrick's Athletic
Andreasen 20'; Christensen 29', 73'; Borring 45'; Nymann 88'	Report

Fionia Park, Odense
Attendance: 5,306
Referee: Bernie Raymond Blom(Nederland)

Odense won 5–0 on aggregate.

- Second qualification round
19 July 2007
20:45

Dinamo Minsk (Belarus)	1–1	(Denmark) Odense
Putjila 72'	Report	Laursen 90'

Dinamo-Yuni Stadium, Minsk
Referee: Mark Courtney (Northern Ireland)
30 August 2007
20:30

Odense (Denmark)	4–0	(Belarus) Dinamo Minsk
Nielsen 37', 55'; Absalonsen 76', 79'	Report

Fionia Park, Odense
Attendance: 6,416
Referee: Michael Weiner(Germany)

Odense won 5–1 on aggregate.

- First round
20 September 2007
20:15

Sparta Prague (Czech Republic)	0–0	(Denmark) Odense
	Report

AXA Arena, Prague
Attendance: 7,247
Referee: Edo Trivkovic (Croatia)
4 October 2007
19:00

Odense (Denmark)	0–0	(Czech Republic) Sparta Prague
	Report

Fionia Park, Odense
Attendance: 10,565
Referee: Igor Egorov(Russia)

Sparta Prague won 4–3 after penalty shootout.

== 2008–09 UEFA Intertoto Cup ==
- Second Round
6 July 2008
17:30

TPS Turku (Finland)	1–2	(Denmark) Odense
One 37'		Djiby Fall 5'; Sørensen 84'

Veritas Stadion, Turku
Attendance: 2,400
Referee: Andrejs Sipailo (Latvia)

13 July 2008
18:00

Odense (Denmark)	2–0	(Finland) TPS Turku
Djiby Fall 21', 52'

Fionia Park, Odense
Attendance: 4,034
Referee: Igor Zakharov (Russia)

Odense won 4–1 on aggregate.

- Third Round
19 July 2008
20:00

Odense (Denmark)	2–2	(England) Aston Villa
Sidwell 25' (o.g.); Møller Christensen 90'		Carew 7'; Laursen 76'

Fionia Park, Odense
Attendance: 11,393
Referee: Andrea De Marco

26 July 2008

Aston Villa (England)	1–0	(Denmark) Odense
A. Young 50'

Villa Park, Birmingham
Attendance: 31,423
Referee: C. Cakir

Aston Villa won 3–2 on aggregate.

== 2009–10 UEFA Europa League ==
- Third qualification round
30 July 2009
17:00

Rabotnički (North Macedonia)	3–4	(Denmark) Odense
Savić 21'; Wandeir 24'; Zé Carlos 74'	Report	Cacá 20', 34', 70'; Sørensen 62' (pen.)

Gradski Stadion, Skopje
Referee: Vladislav Bozborodov (Russia)
6 August 2009
20:05

Odense (Denmark)	3–0	(North Macedonia) Rabotnički
Utaka 52', 76', 80'	Report

Fionia Park, Odense
Referee: Hannes Kaasik (Estonia)

Odense won 7–3 on aggregate.

- Playoff round
20 August 2009
20:45

Genoa (Italy)	3–1	(Denmark) Odense
Moretti 9'; Figueroa 48', 56'	Report	Gíslason 58'

Stadio Luigi Ferraris, Genoa
Referee: Stéphane Lannoy (France)
27 August 2009
20:30

Odense (Denmark)	1–1	(Italy) Genoa
Figueroa 45+2' (o.g.)	Report	Criscito 53'

Fionia Park, Odense
Attendance: 10,001
Referee: Bjorn Kuipers (Netherlands)

Genoa won 4–2 on aggregate.

== 2010–11 UEFA Europa League ==
- Third qualification round
29 July 2010
19:10

Odense (Denmark)	5–3	(Bosnia and Herzegovina) Zrinjski
Gíslason 16'; Absalonsen 23'; Utaka 31', 60'; Andreasen 37'	Report	Zadro 15', 70'; Žižović 65' (pen.)

TRE-FOR Park, Odense
Attendance: 7,500
Referee: Euan Norris (Scotland)
5 August 2010
21:00

Zrinjski (Bosnia and Herzegovina)	0–0	(Denmark) Odense
	Report

Bijeli Brijeg Stadium, Mostar
Attendance: 6,332
Referee: Jiří Jech (Czech Republic)

Odense won 5–3 on aggregate.

- Play-off
19 August 2010
19:05

Odense (Denmark)	2–1	(Scotland) Motherwell
Sørensen 31'; Utaka 78'	Report	Hateley 90+4'

TRE-FOR Park, Odense
Attendance: 14,911
Referee: Zsolt Szabo (Hungary)
26 August 2010
20:45

Motherwell (Scotland)	0–1	(Denmark) Odense
	Report	Utaka 28'

Fir Park, Motherwell
Attendance: 9,105
Referee: Michael Koukoulakis (Greece)

Odense won 3–1 on aggregate.

- Group stage

Team	Pld	W	D	L	GF	GA	GD	Pts
(Germany) VfB Stuttgart	6	5	0	1	16	6	+10	15
(Switzerland) Young Boys	6	3	0	3	10	10	0	9
(Spain) Getafe	6	2	1	3	4	8	−4	7
(Denmark) Odense	6	1	1	4	8	14	−6	4

	GET	OB	STU	YB
Getafe	–	2–1	0–3	1–0
Odense	1–1	–	1–2	2–0
VfB Stuttgart	1–0	5–1	–	3–0
Young Boys	2–0	4–2	4–2	–

16 September 2010
21:05

Getafe (Spain)	2–1	(Denmark) Odense
Arizmendi 51'; Ríos 81'	Report	Andreasen 44'

Coliseum Alfonso Pérez, Getafe
Attendance: 4,000
Referee: Mark Courtney (Northern Ireland)
30 September 2010
19:00

Odense (Denmark)	1–2	(Germany) VfB Stuttgart
Johansson 78'	Report	Kuzmanović 72'; Harnik 86'

TRE-FOR Park, Odense
Attendance: 14,761
Referee: Alexandru Deaconu (Romania)
21 October 2010
19:00

Young Boys (Switzerland)	4–2	(Denmark) Odense
Bienvenu 25'; Sutter 34'; Degen 61'; Lulić 74'	Report	Utaka 48'; Sørensen 84' (pen.)

Stade de Suisse, Bern
Attendance: 12,511
Referee: Kevin Blom (Netherlands)
4 November 2010
21:05

Odense (Denmark)	2–0	(Switzerland) Young Boys
Andreasen 12', 60'	Report

TRE-FOR Park, Odense
Attendance: 5,600
Referee: Aleksandar Stavrev (Macedonia)
1 December 2010
19:00

Odense (Denmark)	1–1	(Spain) Getafe
Andreasen 90+2'	Report	Ríos 17'

TRE-FOR Park, Odense
Attendance: 5,599
Referee: Hannes Kaasik (Estonia)
16 December 2010
21:05

VfB Stuttgart (Germany)	5–1	(Denmark) Odense
Gebhart 20'; Høegh 47' (o.g.); Gentner 65'; Pogrebnyak 70'; Marica 90+3'	Report	Utaka 72'

Mercedes-Benz Arena, Stuttgart
Attendance: 14,000
Referee: Terje Hauge (Norway)

== 2011–12 UEFA Champions League ==
- Third qualification round
27 July 2011
20:00

Odense (Denmark)	1–1	(Greece) Panathinaikos
Reginiussen 90'	Report	Leto 47'

TRE-FOR Park, Odense
Attendance: 10,055
Referee: Carlos Clos Gómez (Spain)
2 August 2011
21:45

Panathinaikos (Greece)	3–4	(Denmark) Odense
Boumsong 37'; Toché 50'; Petropoulos 90+5'	Report	Johansson 12'; Ruud 58'; Kadrii 80'; Andreasen 87'

Olympic Stadium (Athens), Athens
Attendance: 25,000
Referee: Andre Marriner (England)

Odense won 5–4 on aggregate.

- Play-off round
17 August 2011
20:45

Odense (Denmark)	1–0	(Spain) Villarreal
Andreasen 84'	Report

TRE-FOR Park, Odense
Attendance: 13.002
Referee: Damir Skomina
23 August 2011
20:45

Villarreal (Spain)	3–0	(Denmark) Odense
Rossi 50', 66'; Marchena 82'	Report

El Madrigal, Villarreal
Attendance: 18.000
Referee: Craig Thomson

Villarreal won 3–1 on aggregate.

The 2011–12 Champions League play-off lineup that defeated Villarreal 1–0 at home.

== 2011–12 UEFA Europa League ==
- Group stage

Group K

Team	Pld	W	D	L	GF	GA	GD	Pts
(Netherlands) Twente	6	4	1	1	14	7	7	13
(Poland) Wisła Kraków	6	3	0	3	8	13	−5	9
(England) Fulham	6	2	2	2	9	6	3	8
(Denmark) Odense	6	1	1	4	9	14	−5	4

	FUL	OB	TWE	WK
Fulham	–	2–2	1–1	4–1
Odense	0–2	–	1–4	1–2
Twente	1–0	3–2	–	4–1
Wisła Kraków	1–0	1–3	2–1	–

15 September 2011
21:05

Wisła Kraków (Poland)	1–3	(Denmark) Odense
Kirm 54'	Report	Johansson 35'; Utaka 80'; Falk 90+2'

Stadion im. Henryka Reymana, Kraków
Attendance: 12,950
Referee: Sascha Kever (Switzerland)

29 September 2011
19:00

Odense (Denmark)	0–2	(England) Fulham
	Report	Johnson 36', 88'

TRE-FOR Park, Odense
Attendance: 7,969
Referee: Maksim Layushkin

20 October 2011
19:00

Odense (Denmark)	1–4	(Netherlands) Twente
Djiby Fall 71'	Report	Brama 13'; Bajrami 31'; Chadli 65'; De Jong 82'

TRE-FOR Park, Odense
Attendance: 8,036
Referee: David Fernandez Borbalan

3 November 2011
21:05

Twente (Netherlands)	3–2	(Denmark) Odense
Høegh 35' (o.g.); Landzaat 37'; Fer 82'	Report	Djiby Fall 11', 62'

De Grolsch Veste, Enschede
Attendance: 20,000
Referee: Ovidiu Alin Hategan

1 December 2011
19:00

Odense (Denmark)	1–2	(Poland) Wisła Kraków
Jensen 51'	Report	Biton 20'; Malecki 29'

TRE-FOR Park, Odense
Attendance: 5,824
Referee: Laurent Duhamel

14 December 2011
21:05

Fulham (England)	2–2	(Denmark) Odense
Dempsey 27'; Frei 31'	Report	Andreasen 64'; Djiby Fall 90+3'

Craven Cottage, London
Attendance: 15,757
Referee: Alon Yefet
