= 2008–09 in Danish football =

Football in Denmark
- Season: 2008–09

The 2008-09 season is the 119th season of competitive football in Denmark.

== Domestic competitions ==
Competition	Winner	Details	Match Report
Danish Superliga	F.C. Copenhagen	Danish Superliga 2008-09	
Danish Cup	F.C. Copenhagen	Danish Cup 2008-09	Report
Danish 1st Division	Herfølge BK	Danish 1st Division 2008-09	
Danish 2nd Division East	FC Vestsjælland	Danish 2nd Division East 2008-09	
Danish 2nd Division West	FC Fyn	Danish 2nd Division West 2008-09	

== National team ==
=== Players ===
The following players appeared for Denmark during the 2008-09 season. All caps and goals are tallied for the 2008-09 season only.

No.	Pos.	Player	Date of birth (age)	Caps	Goals	Club
	GK	Thomas Sørensen	June 12, 1976	7	0	(The Football Association) Stoke City
	GK	Stephan Andersen	November 26, 1981	2	0	(Danish Football Association) Brøndby IF
	DF	Daniel Agger	December 12, 1984	9	1	(The Football Association) Liverpool
	DF	Lars Jacobsen	September 20, 1979	7	0	(The Football Association) Everton
	DF	Martin Laursen	July 26, 1977	4	0	(The Football Association) Aston Villa
	DF	Per Krøldrup	July 31, 1979	3	0	(Italian Football Federation) Fiorentina
	DF	Kasper Bøgelund	October 8, 1980	2	0	(Danish Football Association) AaB
	DF	Michael Jakobsen	January 2, 1986	2	0	(Danish Football Association) AaB
	DF	Christopher Poulsen	September 11, 1981	2	0	(Danish Football Association) FC Midtjylland
	DF	Thomas Rasmussen	April 16, 1977	2	0	(Danish Football Association) Brøndby IF
	DF	Mathias Zanka Jørgensen	April 23, 1990	1	0	(Danish Football Association) F.C. Copenhagen
	DF	Simon Kjær	March 26, 1989	1	0	(Italian Football Federation) Palermo
	DF	William Kvist	February 24, 1985	1	0	(Danish Football Association) F.C. Copenhagen
	DF	Patrick Mtiliga	January 28, 1981	1	0	(Royal Dutch Football Association) NAC Breda
	DF	Chris Sørensen	July 27, 1977	1	0	(Danish Football Association) OB
	MF	Christian Poulsen	February 28, 1980	8	2	(Italian Football Federation) Juventus
	MF	Daniel Jensen	June 25, 1979	7	1	(German Football Association) Werder Bremen
	MF	Jonas Borring	January 4, 1985	6	1	(Danish Football Association) FC Midtjylland
	MF	Leon Andreasen	April 23, 1983	5	1	(The Football Association) Fulham
	MF	Martin Vingaard	March 20, 1985	4	0	(German Football Association) Esbjerg fB
	MF	Thomas Kahlenberg	March 20, 1983	3	1	(French Football Federation) AJ Auxerre
	MF	Thomas Kristensen	April 17, 1983	3	0	(Danish Football Association) F.C. Copenhagen
	MF	Jakob Poulsen	July 7, 1983	3	0	(Danish Football Association) AGF
	MF	Martin Retov	May 5, 1980	3	0	(German Football Association) Hansa Rostock
	MF	Michael Silberbauer	July 7, 1981	2	0	(Royal Dutch Football Association) Utrecht
	MF	Thomas Augustinussen	March 20, 1981	1	0	(Danish Football Association) AaB
	MF	Hjalte Bo Nørregaard	April 8, 1981	1	0	(Danish Football Association) F.C. Copenhagen
	MF	Mikkel Thygesen	October 22, 1984	1	0	(Danish Football Association) FC Midtjylland
	FW	Dennis Rommedahl	July 22, 1978	9	0	(Royal Dutch Football Association) Ajax
	FW	Nicklas Bendtner	January 16, 1988	8	1	(The Football Association) Arsenal
	FW	Søren Larsen	September 6, 1981	5	5	(French Football Federation) Toulouse FC
	FW	Morten Nordstrand	June 8, 1983	4	1	(Danish Football Association) F.C. Copenhagen
	FW	Jon Dahl Tomasson	August 29, 1976	3	0	(Royal Dutch Football Association) Feyenoord
	FW	Martin Bernburg	December 26, 1985	2	0	(Danish Football Association) FC Nordsjælland
	FW	Martin Jørgensen	October 6, 1975	2	0	(Italian Football Federation) Fiorentina
	FW	Michael Krohn-Dehli	June 6, 1983	2	0	(Danish Football Association) Brøndby IF
	FW	Jesper Grønkjær	August 12, 1977	1	0	(Danish Football Association) F.C. Copenhagen
	FW	Marc Nygaard	September 1, 1976	1	0	(Danish Football Association) Randers FC
	FW	Morten Rasmussen	January 31, 1985	1	0	(Danish Football Association) Brøndby IF
	FW	Peter Løvenkrands	January 29, 1980	1	0	(German Football Association) Schalke 04

=== Friendly matches ===
The home team is on the left column; the away team is on the right column.

20 August 2008	Denmark	0 – 3	Spain	Parken Stadium, Copenhagen
20:15		Report	Alonso 50' 90'; Xavi 73'	Attendance: 26,155; Referee: Martin Hansson (Sweden)

19 November 2008	Denmark	0 – 1	Wales	Brøndby Stadium, Brøndby
20:15		Report	Bellamy 77'	Attendance: 10,271; Referee: Michael Weiner (Germany)

11 February 2009	Greece	1 – 1	Denmark	Karaiskakis Stadium, Athen
20:15	Gekas 62'	Report	Borring 49'	Referee: Alberto Undiano Mallenco (Spain)

=== World Cup qualifiers ===
Denmark competed in Group 1 of the 2010 FIFA World Cup qualification tournament.

The home team is on the left column; the away team is on the right column.

2008-09-06	Hungary	0 – 0	Denmark	Stadium Puskás Ferenc, Budapest
19:45 UTC+2		Report		Attendance: 18,984; Referee: Alain Hamer (Luxembourg)

2008-09-10	Portugal	2 – 3	Denmark	Estádio José Alvalade, Lisbon
20:45 UTC+1	Nani 42'; Deco 86' (pen.)	Report	Bendtner 84'; Poulsen 90'; Jensen 90+2'	Attendance: 33,000; Referee: Howard Webb (England)

2008-10-11	Denmark	3 – 0	Malta	Parken Stadium, Copenhagen
20:00 UTC+2	Larsen 10' 47'; Agger 29' (pen.)	Report		Referee: Levan Paniashvili (Georgia)

2009-03-28	Malta	0 – 3	Denmark	Ta' Qali Stadium, Ta' Qali
20:00 UTC+1		Report	Larsen 12' 23'; Nordstrand 89'	Referee: Tomasz Mikulski (Poland)

2009-04-01	Denmark	3 – 0	Albania	Parken Stadium, Copenhagen
20:15 UTC+2	Andreasen 31'; Larsen 37'; Poulsen 80'	Report		Referee: Damir Skomina (Slovenia)

2009-06-06	Sweden	0 – 1	Denmark	Råsunda Stadium, Solna
20:00 UTC+2		Report	Kahlenberg 22'	Attendance: 33,619; Referee: Mike Riley (England)

== League XI national team ==
On December 5, 2008, a 20-man squad Denmark League XI national football team was named to play the 2009 King's Cup in Thailand. In the following month, a total ten players pulled out of the squad and had to be replaced in turn.

Olsen had initially refrained from selecting players from AaB due to their participation in the UEFA Cup, and when F.C. Copenhagen also advanced in that tournament, Copenhagen players Mathias Jørgensen, Hjalte Bo Nørregaard, Thomas Kristensen, and Martin Vingaard were replaced. Additionally, Mikkel Bischoff, Steffen Kielstrup, Anders Randrup, Thomas Rasmussen, Christopher Poulsen, as well as replacement player Jonas Troest, all had to pull out due to injuries.

The team played two games, as it won the tournament. The number of caps and goals reflect performances during the two matches.

=== Players ===
No.	Pos.	Player	Date of birth (age)	Caps	Goals	Club
1	GK	Kim Christensen	July 16, 1979	1	0	(Swedish Football Association) IFK Göteborg
16	GK	Kevin Stuhr Ellegaard	May 23, 1983	1	0	(Danish Football Association) Randers FC
5	DF	Anders Møller Christensen	July 26, 1977	2	0	(Danish Football Association) OB
11	DF	Jan Frederiksen (replacement)	June 20, 1982	1	0	(Danish Football Association) Randers FC
15	DF	Chris Sørensen (replacement)	July 27, 1977	2	0	(Danish Football Association) OB
20	DF	Kenneth Emil Petersen (replacement)	January 15, 1985	2	0	(Danish Football Association) AC Horsens
3	MF	Jens Gjesing (replacement)	January 13, 1986	0	0	(Danish Football Association) AGF
4	MF	Jonas Borring	January 4, 1985	2	0	(Danish Football Association) FC Midtjylland
7	MF	Ken Ilsø	December 2, 1986	2	1	(Danish Football Association) SønderjyskE
8	MF	Johnny Thomsen (replacement)	February 26, 1982	1	0	(Danish Football Association) SønderjyskE
10	MF	Danny Olsen	June 11, 1985	2	1	(Danish Football Association) FC Midtjylland
12	MF	Jakob Poulsen (replacement)	July 7, 1983	2	0	(Danish Football Association) AGF
13	MF	Jesper Jørgensen (replacement)	May 9, 1984	2	0	(Danish Football Association) Esbjerg fB
17	MF	Søren Rieks	April 7, 1987	1	1	(Danish Football Association) Esbjerg fB
18	MF	Nicolai Stokholm (replacement)	April 1, 1976	2	0	(Danish Football Association) FC Nordsjælland
19	MF	Mikkel Thygesen	October 22, 1984	2	0	(Danish Football Association) FC Midtjylland
2	FW	Martin Bernburg	December 26, 1985	2	0	(Danish Football Association) FC Nordsjælland
6	FW	Bajram Fetai (replacement)	September 7, 1985	2	0	(Danish Football Association) FC Nordsjælland
9	FW	Michael Krohn-Dehli	June 6, 1983	2	0	(Danish Football Association) Brøndby IF
14	FW	Morten Rasmussen	January 31, 1985	2	0	(Danish Football Association) Brøndby IF

=== Schedule ===
21 January 2009 2009 King's Cup	Denmark	1 – 0	North Korea	Phuket, Thailand
16:15 CET	Rieks 22'	Report		Stadium: Surakul Sports Stadium; Attendance: 3,500

23 January 2009 2009 King's Cup	Thailand	2 – 2 (3 – 5 p)	Denmark	Phuket, Thailand
19:00 CET	Suksomkit 66' (pen.); Suksomkit 81'	Report	Olsen 35'; Ilsø 90'	Stadium: Surakul Sports Stadium; Attendance: 15,000
	Penalties
	Suksomkit (penalty scored); Thonglao (penalty missed); Sangsanoi (penalty scored); Vivachaichok (penalty scored)		(penalty scored) Stokholm; (penalty scored) Rasmussen; (penalty scored) Bernburg; (penalty scored) Ilsø; (penalty scored) Poulsen

== See also ==
- F.C. Copenhagen season 2008-09
