= Mustapha Papa Diop =

Senegalese footballer (born 1987)

Personal information
- Full name: Mustapha Papa Diop
- Date of birth: May 1, 1987 (age 39)
- Place of birth: Senegal
- Height: 1.82 m (6 ft 0 in)
- Position: Midfielder

Senior career*
Years	Team	Apps	(Gls)
2006–2007	Marseille	1	(0)
2007–2008	OB	0	(0)
2010–2011	FC Fyn	1	(0)
- * Club domestic league appearances and goals

Mustapha Papa Diop (born 1 May 1987) is a Senegalese former professional footballer who played as a midfielder.
