= 2011–12 Danish Cup =

DBU Pokalen (The DBU Cup)

Tournament details
- Country: Denmark
- Teams: 106

Final positions
- Champions: F.C. Copenhagen
- Runners-up: AC Horsens

The 2011–12 Danish Cup was the 58th season of the Danish Cup competition. After being rebranded, the tournament will be the first under the new name DBU Pokalen (The DBU Cup). The winner of the competition qualifies for the play-off round of the 2012–13 UEFA Europa League.

== Overview ==
Round	Matches	Clubs remaining	Clubs involved	Winners from previous round	New entries this round	Leagues entering at this round (positions from previous season)
First round 9–11 August 2011	46	106	94	48^{a}	46	Superliga (2 clubs – places 11–12), First Division (13 clubs – places 3–16, excluding Kolding FC), Second Divisions (31 clubs, all teams excluding Ølstykke FC) Regional qualification (48 clubs)
Second round 30 August–1 September 2011	28	60	56	48^{b}	8	Superliga (6 clubs – places 5–10), First Division (2 clubs – places 1–2)
Third round 20–22 September 2011	16	32	32	32	4	Superliga (4 clubs – places 1–4)
Fourth round 25–27 October 2011	8	16	16	16	0	
Quarter-finals; 22–24 November 2011	4	8	8	8	0	
Semi-finals; First leg 18–19 April 2012; Second leg 25–26 April 2012	2	4	4	4	0	
Final; 17 May 2012	1	2	2	2	0	

- From regional qualification
- Including 2 byes

== First round ==
Normally, 96 teams – would have been drawn into the first round, but because of the mergers of Kolding FC (with Vejle Boldklub to Vejle Boldklub Kolding) and Ølstykke FC (with Stenløse BK to SC Egedal), only 94 teams were eligible for the draw and two byes were given out. Matches are scheduled for 9–11 August but may be rescheduled for television coverage.

=== Jutland, north ===
Team 1	Score	Team 2
Frederikshavn fI	0–5	Lindholm IF
Koldby/Hørdum IF	0–2	Aars IF
Skagen IK	0–7	FC Hjørring
Aalborg Freja	0–3	Hobro IK
Aalborg Chang	1–3	Thisted FC

Blokhus FC received a bye into the second round.

=== Jutland, middle ===
Team 1	Score	Team 2
Viborg FF	1–1 (4–2 p)	Skive IK
IF Lyseng	0–2	Brabrand IF
FC Djursland	1–8	Randers FC
Holstebro BK	2–1	Aarhus Fremad
VRI	2–6	Viby IF

Skovbakken IK received a bye into the second round.

=== Jutland, south ===
Team 1	Score	Team 2
Herning KFUM	4–2	Aabenraa BK
Odder IGF	1–2	Ringkøbing IF
FC Sydvest	1–3	Esbjerg fB
FC Skanderborg	3–1	Varde IF
Esbjerg IF 92	1–2	Tjørring IF
KSC Harte	1–4	FC Fredericia
Funder GF	2–6	Vejle Boldklub Kolding

=== Funen ===
Team 1	Score	Team 2
Middelfart G&BK	6–7	FC Fyn
Tved BK	1–5	BK Marienlyst
Nyborg G&IF	2–2 (5–7 p)	OKS
Næsby BK	2–1	Otterup B&IK
Langeskov IF	5–1	Fjordager IF
Tommerup BK	0–9	FC Svendborg

=== Zealand and Lolland-Falster ===
Team 1	Score	Team 2
Asnæs BK	0–6	Nordvest FC
Ringsted IF	1–5	Svebølle BI
Nakskov BK	0–8	FC Roskilde
Lolland-Falster Alliancen	0–1	Næstved BK
Rishøj BK	0–4	FC Vestsjælland
Toreby-Grænge BK	0–2	Døllefjelde-Musse IF

=== Copenhagen, North Zealand and Bornholm ===
Team 1	Score	Team 2
BK Rødovre	1–4	Jægersborg BK
Værebro BK	1–5	Hvidovre IF
Avedøre IF	2–2 (3–4 p)	AB
SC Egedal	1–2	B 1908
Avanta BK	0–3	Herlev IF
Femhøj IF	4–5	Kastrup BK
NB Bornholm	2–6	Hellerup IK
BSF	3–3 (8–7 p)	BGA
Hillerød Fodbold	3–2	KFUM's Boldklub
Greve Fodbold	0–3	Brønshøj IF
BK Frem	3–1 (a.e.t.)	B 93
Frederikssund IK	0–6	Vanløse IF
Ledøje-Smørum Fodbold	1–2	BK Søllerød-Vedbæk
BK Fix	0–3	Helsinge Fodbold
Gladsaxe-Hero BK	1–3	Fredensborg B&I
Allerød FK	3–1	Frederiksberg Boldklub
BK Skjold	0–3	Elite 3000

== Second round ==
Number 5–10 from the previous season's Superliga and the two promoted teams from the previous season's First Division will enter in the second round. The matches will be played from 30 August – 1 September.

=== West ===
Team 1	Score	Team 2
Viborg FF	2–2 (6–5 p)	AaB
Brabrand IF	0–1	SønderjyskE
Blokhus FC	2–5	AGF
FC Fyn	2–8	Silkeborg IF
Holstebro BK	0–5	AC Horsens
Aars IF	1–0	Lindholm IF
OKS	1–4	Esbjerg fB
Tjørring IF	0–3	FC Hjørring
Herning KFUM	2–7	Vejle Boldklub Kolding
Thisted FC	2–3 (a.e.t.)	BK Marienlyst
Ringkøbing IF	6–4 (a.e.t.)	Viby IF
FC Skanderborg	0–4	Hobro IK
Langeskov IF	0–5	Randers FC
Skovbakken IK	1–3	FC Fredericia

=== East ===
Team 1	Score	Team 2
FC Roskilde	1–1 (3–1 p)	Lyngby Boldklub
HIK	0–2	HB Køge
Hillerød Fodbold	0–6	FC Nordsjælland
Jægersborg BK	3–0	BK Søllerød-Vedbæk
BK Frem	0–2	Næsby BK
Fredensborg B&I	2–4	FC Svendborg
Nordvest FC	3–2 (a.e.t.)	B 1908
Herlev IF	4–3 (a.e.t.)	Brønshøj IF
Helsinge Fodbold	1–4	Svebølle BI
Døllefjelde-Musse IF	0–3	AB
Vanløse IF	1–5	Hvidovre IF
BSF	0–5	FC Vestsjælland
Allerød FK	1–3	Næstved BK
Kastrup BK	1–4	Elite 3000

== Third round ==
Team 1	Score	Team 2
Jægersborg BK	0–6	FC Midtjylland
FC Hjørring	0–2	FC Nordsjælland
FC Fredericia	1–0	OB
Svebølle BI	0–1	SønderjyskE
Elite 3000	0–4	Brøndby IF
AB	0–3	AC Horsens
FC Vestsjælland	0–2	FC København
Hvidovre IF	2–2 (8–9 p)	AGF
Randers FC	1–2 (a.e.t.)	Silkeborg IF
Esbjerg fB	1–3 (a.e.t.)	HB Køge
BK Marienlyst	1–4	Hobro IK
Aars IF	2–5	Herlev IF
Ringkøbing IF	1–5	Vejle Boldklub Kolding
FC Svendborg	1–1 (4–5 p)	FC Roskilde
Næsby BK	2–1	Næstved BK
Nordvest FC	0–1	Viborg FF

== Fourth round ==
Team 1	Score	Team 2
Hobro IK	0–2	SønderjyskE
Herlev IF	2–3	AC Horsens
Vejle Boldklub Kolding	1–0 (a.e.t.)	AGF
FC Fredericia	1–1 (7–6 p)	Viborg FF
Næsby BK	4–3	Silkeborg IF
Brøndby IF	0–3	FC Copenhagen
FC Roskilde	1–2	HB Køge
FC Nordsjælland	1–0	FC Midtjylland

== Quarter-finals ==
23 November 2011	Næsby BK	1–5	SønderjyskE	Odense
13:15	Naundrup 80'	Report	Bechmann 29', 43', 53'; Jenssen 54'; Paulsen 66'	Stadium: Næsby Stadion; Referee: Henning Jensen

24 November 2011	Vejle Boldklub Kolding	1–2	HB Køge	Vejle
16:00	Ankersen 74'	Report	Sørensen 24'; Runsewe 72'	Stadium: Jokri Park; Referee: Michael Svendsen

24 November 2011	FC Fredericia	1–2	AC Horsens	Fredericia
18:00	Christiansen 26'	Report	Retov 30', 36'	Stadium: Monjasa Park; Referee: Michael Tykgaard

24 November 2011	FC Copenhagen	2–0	FC Nordsjælland	Copenhagen
20:00	Ottesen 88'; Diouf 90+1'	Report		Stadium: Parken; Referee: Michael Johansen

== Semi-finals ==
Team 1	Agg.	Team 2	1st leg	2nd leg
FC Copenhagen	4–4 (a)	SønderjyskE	1–0	3–4
HB Køge	2–3	AC Horsens	2–2	0–1

=== First leg ===
18 April 2012	FC Copenhagen	1–0	SønderjyskE	Copenhagen
18:00	Abdellaoue 4'	Report		Stadium: Parken; Referee: Mads-Kristoffer Kristoffersen

19 April 2012	HB Køge	2–2	AC Horsens	Herfølge
18:00	Richter 52'; Runsewe 62'	Report	Kryger 41'; Rasmussen 90+3'	Stadium: SEAS-NVE Park; Referee: Anders Poulsen

=== Second leg ===
25 April 2012	SønderjyskE	4–3 (4–4 (a) agg.)	FC Copenhagen	Haderslev
18:00	Héðinsson 16'; Paulsen 28'; Antipas 43', 56'	Report	N'Doye 13', 53'; Santin 84' (pen.)	Stadium: Haderslev Fodboldstadion; Attendance: 3,758; Referee: Jakob Kehlet

26 April 2012	AC Horsens	1–0 (3–2 agg.)	HB Køge	Horsens
18:00	Mehl 86'	Report		Stadium: CASA Arena Horsens; Attendance: 3,119; Referee: Michael Tykgaard

== Final ==
17 May 2012
18:00 CEST (UTC+02)

AC Horsens	0–1	F.C. Copenhagen
		Claudemir 42'

Parken, Copenhagen
Attendance: 21,963
Referee: Lars Christoffersen
