= Seejou King =

Danish footballer (born 1992)

Personal information
- Date of birth: 14 April 1992 (age 34)
- Place of birth: Hvidovre, Denmark
- Height: 1.80 m (5 ft 11 in)
- Position: Left-back

Youth career
- –2007: Skjold
- 2007–2008: Hvidovre
- 2008–2011: Nordsjælland

Senior career*
Years	Team	Apps	(Gls)
2011–2013	Nordsjælland	5	(0)
2013	→ Sporting CP B (loan)	14	(3)
2013–2016	Sporting CP B	35	(0)
2016–2017	Aves	0	(0)
2018	Avarta	12	(0)
2018–2020	AB	40	(3)
2020	B1908	9	(0)
2021–2022	Skovshoved	30	(0)
Total		145	(6)
- * Club domestic league appearances and goals

Seejou King (born 14 April 1992) is a Danish former professional footballer who played as a left-back. Born in Denmark, he is of Gambian descent.

== Early life ==
Seejou King was born in Hvidovre, Denmark. He played under-17 football with Hvidovre IF, before being picked up by Nordsjælland.

== Senior career ==
=== Nordsjælland ===
At the start of the 2011–12 Danish Superliga season, Nordsjælland lacked a left-back following the sale of Pierre Bengtsson to Copenhagen the previous winter and the end of Bryan Oviedo's loan spell. As a result, King was promoted to the first team.

He made his debut on 16 July 2011 in a 2–0 loss to OB, the opening match of the season, receiving a yellow card for a foul on Andreas Johansson. He made five appearances in the Superliga before being pushed down the pecking order following the arrival of Danish international Patrick Mtiliga.

=== Sporting CP ===
At the end of the 2013 January transfer window, Nordsjælland confirmed that Sporting B, the reserve team of Sporting CP, had signed King on loan for the remainder of the season. He made his debut on 10 February 2013 against Arouca. On 28 June 2013, Sporting made the move permanent, signing King on a contract until 2016.

=== Aves ===
In the summer of 2016, King transferred from Sporting CP to Aves, a club in Portugal's second division. Two weeks before the season's start in August, King suffered an injury. Upon arriving at the training facility, he was informed by the sports director that he was suspended, with the club stating they could not utilize an injured player.

During his tenure at Aves, King faced several challenges. He experienced financial difficulties, including receiving his salary in cash-filled envelopes that often contained less than the agreed amount. Additionally, he reportedly faced threats from the club's Brazilian president, contributing to an unstable and challenging environment. King did not make any official appearances for Aves.

=== Return to Denmark ===
Following his departure from Aves, King returned to Denmark, spending a year without a club before signing with Avarta in the Danish 2nd Division. He later joined Akademisk Boldklub (AB), where he became the oldest member of the squad. Alongside his playing career, he worked as a substitute teacher.

King later played for lower-division sides B1908 and Skovshoved.

== Personal life ==
King has two daughters and has spoken about the importance of family stability following his return to Denmark. He has maintained friendships from his time in Portugal, notably with Eric Dier, a former teammate at Sporting CP.

== Career statistics ==
Appearances and goals by club, season and competition
Club	Season	League			Cup		Other		Total	
Club	Season	Division	Apps	Goals	Apps	Goals	Apps	Goals	Apps	Goals
Nordsjælland	2011–12	Danish Superliga	5	0	1	0	—		6	0
Nordsjælland	2012–13	Danish Superliga	0	0	1	0	—		1	0
Nordsjælland	Total		5	0	2	0	—		5	0
Sporting CP B (loan)	2012–13	Segunda Liga	14	3	—		—		14	3
Sporting CP B	2013–14	Segunda Liga	15	0	—		—		15	0
Sporting CP B	2014–15	Segunda Liga	6	0	—		—		6	0
Sporting CP B	2015–16	LigaPro	14	0	—		—		14	0
Sporting CP B	Total		49	3	—		—		49	3
Aves	2016–17	LigaPro	0	0	0	0	—		0	0
Avarta	2017–18	2nd Divisions	12	0	0	0	—		12	0
AB	2018–19	2nd Divisions	22	2	1	0	—		23	2
AB	2019–20	2nd Divisions	18	1	4	1	—		22	2
AB	Total		40	3	5	1	—		45	4
B1908	2020–21	Denmark Series	9	0	1	0	—		10	0
Skovshoved	2020–21	2nd Divisions	14	0	0	0	—		14	0
Skovshoved	2021–22	Denmark Series	16	0	0	0	—		16	0
Skovshoved	2022–23	Copenhagen Series	0	0	1	0	—		1	0
Skovshoved	Total		30	0	1	0	—		31	0
Career total			145	6	9	1	0	0	5	0

== Honours ==
Nordsjælland

- Danish Superliga: 2011–12
