= Martin Halle =

Danish footballer (born 1981)

Personal information
- Date of birth: 16 October 1981 (age 45)
- Place of birth: Denmark
- Height: 1.86 m (6 ft 1 in)
- Position: Defender

Youth career
- 1985–1994: Brabrand IF
- 1994–1999: Aarhus GF

Senior career*
Years	Team	Apps	(Gls)
1999–2000	Aarhus GF		
2000–2004	FC Århus		
2003	FC Midtjylland (loan)	1	(0)
2004–2007	AC Horsens		
2008–2010	SønderjyskE	30	(0)
- * Club domestic league appearances and goals

Martin Halle (born 16 October 1981) is a Danish retired football player in the defender position. He played for a number of Danish clubs, including FC Midtjylland, AC Horsens, and SønderjyskE in the Danish Superliga championship.

== Biography ==
Halle started his career with Danish 1st Division clubs Aarhus GF and FC Århus. During his time at FC Århus, he joined top-flight Danish Superliga team FC Midtjylland on loan in February 2003, and played one Superliga game for the club in May 2003.

In the summer of 2004, Halle joined 1st Division rivals AC Horsens under manager Kent Nielsen. He was a part of the first team starting line-up for almost his entire time at the club, playing as a left back defender. In his first season with the Horsens, he helped the club win promotion for the Superliga. He never scored a Superliga goal for Horsens, but his defensive qualities gained him his place in the team. He played full-time in the first 12 games of the Danish Superliga 2005-06, but suffered an injury, and did not re-establish his place in the team until April 2006. He underwent surgery in the off-season, and did not enter the starting line-up until the eighth round of the Danish Superliga 2006-07, but only missed two games for the rest of the season. With Halle's contract expiring in the summer 2008, Horsens brought in left back Joseph Elanga in January 2008, and Halle left the club to join 1st Division side SønderjyskE.

In his first season at SønderjyskE, Halle helped the club win promotion for the Superliga. He suffered from several injuries during his first time at Horsens, and took part in 16 of 33 games during the Danish Superliga 2008-09, including only one full-time game. He got an extended run in the first team in the first months of the Danish Superliga 2009-10, but was eventually replaced by Andrei Sidorenkov. He ended his career in May 2010, due to persisting injury problems.
