= Jan Frederiksen =

Danish footballer (born 1982)

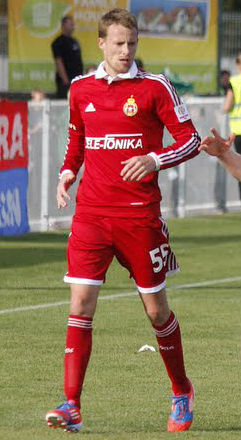

Personal information
- Full name: Jan Frederiksen
- Date of birth: 20 June 1982 (age 44)
- Place of birth: Copenhagen, Denmark
- Height: 1.81 m (5 ft 11 in)
- Position: Left-back

Senior career*
Years	Team	Apps	(Gls)
2001	Lyngby	8	(0)
2002	Feyenoord	0	(0)
2002	→ Excelsior (loan)	3	(0)
2003–2005	Midtjylland	12	(0)
2004–2005	→ Herfølge (loan)	26	(0)
2005–2006	Herfølge	45	(1)
2007–2009	Randers	73	(1)
2009–2012	Brøndby	47	(1)
2012–2013	Wisła Kraków	11	(0)
2013	Vejle Kolding	11	(0)
2013–2014	AB	12	(0)
2016–2018	FC Græsrødderne		

International career
2001	Denmark U19	7	(0)
2002	Denmark U20	6	(0)
2002–2003	Denmark U21	2	(0)
- * Club domestic league appearances and goals

Jan Frederiksen (born 20 June 1982) is a Danish former professional footballer who played as a left-back.

== Club career ==
Frederiksen began his career at Lyngby Boldklub, where he made his Superliga debut during the 2000–01 season. In 2002, he moved to Feyenoord, but subsequently was loaned out to its satellite club Excelsior. After one year in the Netherlands, Frederiksen returned to Denmark and signed with FC Midtjylland. Then he played for Herfølge Boldklub, before moving to Randers FC. On 16 January 2009, he signed a three-year contract with Brøndby IF, and joined the club on a free transfer on 1 July. On 8 August 2012, Frederiksen moved to Polish Ekstraklasa side Wisła Kraków.

Ahead of the 2013 MLS season, Frederiksen was on trial with American soccer club, D.C. United, but he was eventually cut by the team.

== International career ==
Frederiksen represented the country at youth level, playing for the Denmark under-19, under-20 and under-21 national teams.
