= Henrik Hansen (footballer) =

Danish footballer (born 1979)

Personal information
- Full name: Henrik Hallenberg Hansen
- Date of birth: 28 July 1979 (age 47)
- Place of birth: Denmark
- Height: 1.79 m (5 ft 10 in)
- Position: Midfielder

Team information
- Current team: Brøndby (assistant)

Senior career*
Years	Team	Apps	(Gls)
1997–2002	Næstved	130	(—)
2002–2004	Esbjerg fB	31	(0)
2004–2006	SønderjyskE	49	(7)
2007–2008	Horsens	45	(17)
2008–2011	OB	61	(5)
2010–2011	→ SønderjyskE (loan)	24	(1)
2011–2015	SønderjyskE	100	(9)
Total		440	(39)

International career
1997	Denmark U-19	4	(0)

Managerial career
- 2015–2017: SønderjyskE (youth)
- 2017–2018: SønderjyskE (assistant)
- 2018–2021: OB (assistant)
- 2021–2022: SønderjyskE
- 2024–: Brøndby (assistant)
- * Club domestic league appearances and goals

Henrik Hallenberg Hansen (born 28 July 1979) is a Danish former professional football midfielder. He is currently an assistant coach of Danish Superliga club Brøndby IF.

== Club career ==
Hansen joined AC Horsens in the winter of 2007 and made an immediate impact on the team. AC Horsens, until then known as a defensive team with little offensive force was added much creativity with Hansen, and during his first year in the club he scored 11 Danish Superliga goals. On 18 December 2007, his performance was rewarded with a call-up for the Denmark national football team.

Hansen has previously played for Næstved IF, Esbjerg fB and SønderjyskE. On 14 July 2008, Hansen signed a 3 1/2-year contract with OB.

=== Coaching career ===
Hansen ended his career at SønderjyskE in June 2015 and was immediately hired as an 'A+ coach': a coach who is responsible for the talent setup out in their respective clubs. Hansen was promoted to the first team management in January 2017, as an assistant manager to Claus Nørgaard.

In April 2018 it was confirmed, that Hansens would join OB as an assistant manager from the beginning of the new 2018-19 season. In December 2021, Hansen was appointed new manager at his former club, SønderjyskE. He signed a contract until June 2024. He did not manage to save the club from relegation, and in the following season the club' results were inconsistent, and he was sacked in November 2022.

On June 4, 2024 Hansen was appointed as a new assistant coach at Brøndby IF, to replace Martin Retov who left the club to head AC Horsens.

Sporting positions
Preceded by (Iceland) Ólafur Ingi Skúlason	SønderjyskE captain 2011–2015	Succeeded by (Denmark) Pierre Kanstrup
