= Morten Rasmussen (footballer, born March 1985) =

Danish footballer (born 1985)

Personal information
- Full name: Morten Rasmussen
- Date of birth: 26 March 1985 (age 41)
- Place of birth: Hvidovre, Denmark
- Height: 1.88 m (6 ft 2 in)
- Position: Defender

Youth career
- 1991–1998: Glostrup IF 32
- 1998–2005: Brøndby IF

Senior career*
Years	Team	Apps	(Gls)
2005–2008	Brøndby IF	39	(1)
2008–2015	AC Horsens	141	(8)
2015–2016	FC Vestsjælland	8	(0)
2016–2017	Fremad Amager	20	(0)

International career
2006	Denmark U-21	3	(0)
- * Club domestic league appearances and goals as of 28 January 2016

Morten "Molle" Rasmussen (born 26 March 1985) is a Danish professional footballer who plays as a defender. He last played for Fremad Amager in the Danish 1st Division.

== Club career ==
Morten Rasmussen debuted for Brøndby's first team 2 October 2005 against AC Horsens. He has mostly been used as a central defender, but after Mark Howard joined Brøndby's squad in June 2006, Rasmussen has been playing the back position.

Currently the 188 cm tall defender is noted for a total of 25 appearances and 1 goal for Brøndby. He has appeared in the national Superliga championship, as well as the national Danish Cup and the international UEFA Cup tournament. His talent has not only taken him to the first team in Brøndby; In August 2006, he made his debut for the Denmark under-21 national football team.
