= Zé Carlos (footballer, born 1979) =

Brazilian footballer

Personal information
- Full name: José Carlos Gomes Filho
- Date of birth: 4 October 1979 (age 47)
- Place of birth: Rio de Janeiro, Brazil
- Height: 1.77 m (5 ft 10 in)
- Position: Midfielder

Youth career
- Fluminense

Senior career*
Years	Team	Apps	(Gls)
1998–1999	Ituano		
2000	Moto Club		
2001	União Madeira		
2021	Canto do Rio		
2002–2005	Comercial-PR		
2003	→ Penafiel (loan)		
2004	→ Liverpool (loan)		
2004–2005	→ Canelas (loan)		
2006	Jorge Wilstermann		
2006–2008	Vardar	7	(0)
2007–2008	→ Cementarnica 55 (loan)		
2008–2010	Rabotnički	15	(1)
2011–2013	Teresópolis		
- * Club domestic league appearances and goals

José Carlos Gomes Filho (born 4 October 1979) is a Brazilian former football player.

== Biography ==
Zé Carlos was born and raised in Teresópolis in Rio de Janeiro state and has one sister. When Zé was 7 years old, he started his football career playing futsal at Clube Comary. Zé's fast play and scoring abilities were noticed by Mario Mendes, director of Fluminense FC. Mendes advised Zé to switch to the field game at Fluminense.

Later, Zé Carlos started his professional career at Ituano in São Paulo at eighteen years of age.

He was signed by Penafiel in September 2003.

He went to Bolivia to play for Jorge Wilstermann in February 2006.

Since 2006 he has been playing in the Macedonian First League.
