= Eric Djemba-Djemba =

Cameroonian footballer (born 1981)

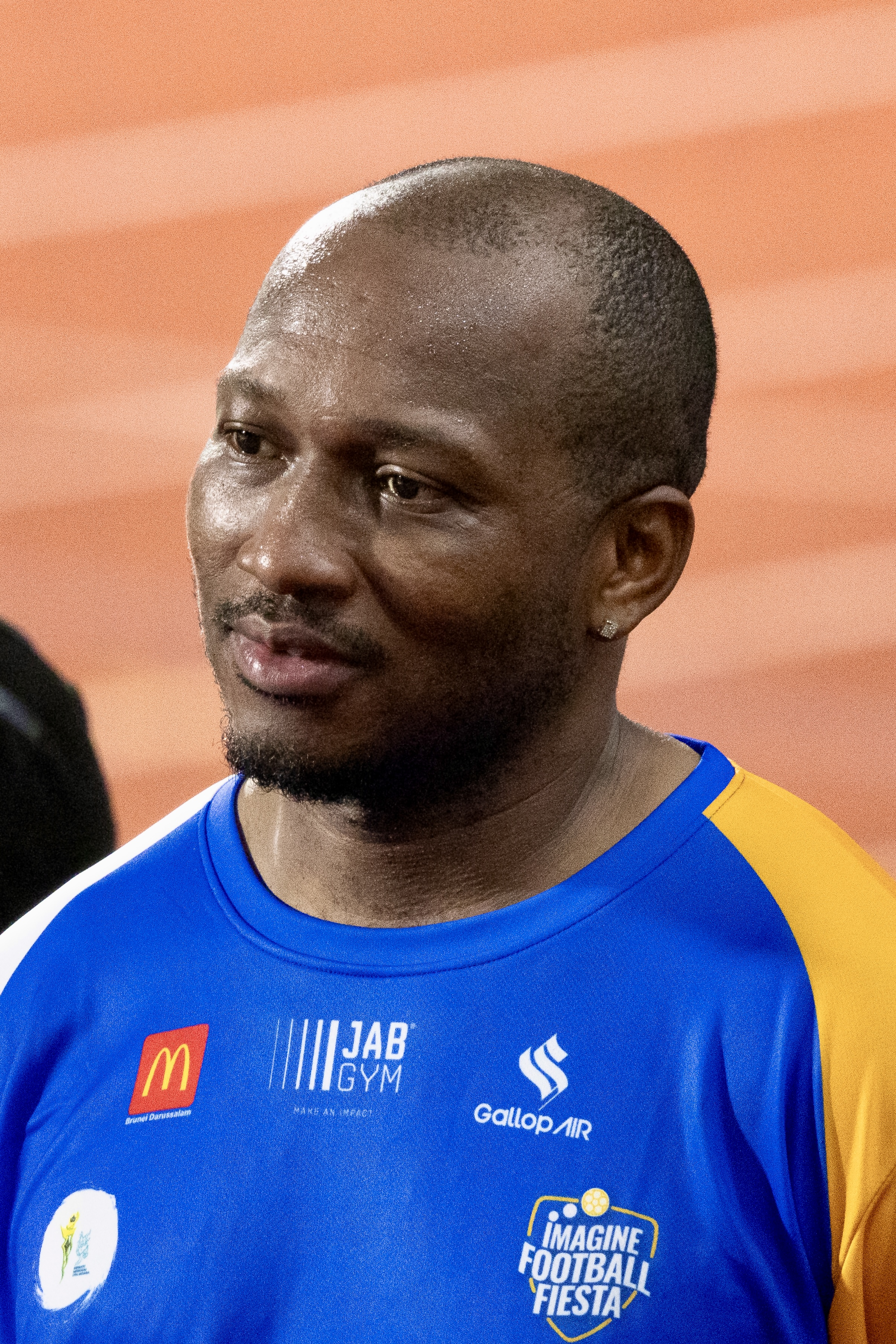
- Djemba-Djemba in 2024

Personal information
- Full name: Eric Daniel Djemba-Djemba
- Date of birth: 4 May 1981 (age 45)
- Place of birth: Douala, Cameroon
- Height: 5 ft 11 in (1.80 m)
- Position: Midfielder

Senior career*
Years	Team	Apps	(Gls)
2001–2003	Nantes	42	(1)
2003–2005	Manchester United	20	(0)
2005–2007	Aston Villa	11	(0)
2007	→ Burnley (loan)	15	(0)
2007–2008	Qatar SC	26	(3)
2008–2012	OB	102	(3)
2012–2013	Hapoel Tel Aviv	28	(0)
2013	Partizan	16	(0)
2014	St Mirren	2	(0)
2014–2015	Chennaiyin	9	(0)
2015	Persebaya ISL	0	(0)
2016	Châteaubriant	0	(0)
2017–2019	Vallorbe/Ballaigues	30	(4)
2019–2020	UMS de Loum		
Total		317+	(11+)

International career
2002–2011	Cameroon	34	(0)
Medal record
Men's football
Representing Cameroon
Africa Cup of Nations
Winner	2002 Mali
FIFA Confederations Cup
Runner-up	2003 France
- * Club domestic league appearances and goals

Eric Daniel Djemba-Djemba (born 4 May 1981) is a Cameroonian former professional footballer who played as a midfielder. He previously played club football in France, England, Qatar, Denmark, Israel, Serbia, Scotland, India and Indonesia. In international competition, he represented Cameroon, having appeared for his country 34 times, including at the 2002 FIFA World Cup.

== Club career ==
=== Nantes ===
Djemba-Djemba rose to prominence with Nantes in France, where he forged a successful partnership with Mathieu Berson. His performances as a feisty and uncompromising tackler for the French club earned him a move to Manchester United for £3.5 million in the summer of 2003, signed by Alex Ferguson as a possible eventual successor to then 31-year-old Roy Keane.

=== Manchester United ===
Arriving in England, Djemba-Djemba established his aggressive style on his debut against Arsenal in the FA Community Shield, with a tackle on Arsenal's Sol Campbell which Arsène Wenger called "obscene".

In 18 months at Old Trafford, Djemba-Djemba found it difficult to maintain a period of sustained form, and he was eventually unable to establish himself as a player capable of eventually succeeding the ageing captain Roy Keane in the centre of the United midfield. A highlight during his United career was when he scored a looping volley against Leeds United in the League Cup. With the score at 2–2 and three minutes of extra time left, Quinton Fortune swung in a corner which reached Djemba-Djemba, who hit it first time and it looped over Leeds goalkeeper Paul Robinson which secured a 3–2 win and progression to the next round. He scored only once more for United, in a 5–0 UEFA Champions League win over Greek side Panathinaikos.

=== Aston Villa ===
Djemba-Djemba was sold to Aston Villa in the January 2005 transfer window for a fee of £1.5 million. However, the move did little to restore the player's reputation as he found it difficult to move ahead of Gavin McCann and Steven Davis in Villa's midfield. After being played only once, as a late substitute against Arsenal in the first ever game at the Emirates Stadium, by new Villa manager Martin O'Neill on the first day of the 2006–07 season, Djemba-Djemba was loaned out to Championship club Burnley for the remainder of the season in the January transfer window.

==== Loan to Burnley ====
Djemba-Djemba made his first appearance for Burnley on 13 January 2007 against Southampton, playing the full 90 minutes. Early in his time at Turf Moor, he was sent off for the Lancashire side after a second bookable offence at Derby County; however he impressed with his skillful and effective play during his loan spell.

During July 2007, all signs pointed to Djemba-Djemba leaving Villa Park after he was the only member of the first-team squad not to be included in the North American tour and his contract was subsequently terminated by Aston Villa.

=== Qatar SC ===
Following his departure from Aston Villa, Djemba-Djemba joined Qatar SC. He only played one season at the Qatar-based club, but managed to get his football career back on track.

=== Odense BK ===
On 16 July 2008, Djemba-Djemba signed a three-year contract with Danish side OB, the contract was later extended with a year. He previously went on a trial with the club and made his Odense debut against former club Aston Villa in the Intertoto Cup. Odense drew the match 1–1, losing 2–1 on aggregate. In his career in Odense, Djemba-Djemba impressed the club's fans, with his good ball skills and great performances. In his first season as an Odense player, he played good football, and was described by many as the league's best player. In 2009, in the 72nd minute against Esbjerg away, Djemba-Djemba became the first player in the Danish league to assist with his sock, as the sole of his right boot had come off, forcing him to finish the game with one boot. Later that year, Djemba-Djemba was among three other players to be nominated for the SAS Liga player of the year.

In the summer of 2010, Djemba-Djemba was linked with a move back to England to join West Bromwich Albion and Italian side Lecce. After travelling to England for talks, the move broke down, and this led to accusations against West Brom by the club and Djemba-Djemba himself.

At the end of the 2011–12 season, Djemba-Djemba's future at OB was uncertain after his contract expired. Despite expected negotiations, Djemba-Djemba instead left the club. The year before, he, along with Peter Utaka, had been told by the club's officials that their contracts would not be renewed. As a result of their contracts not being renewed, the club decided to release players sooner rather than later.

=== Hapoel Tel Aviv ===
On 14 August 2012, Djemba-Djemba signed a two-year contract with Israeli club Hapoel Tel Aviv. Djemba-Djemba played a total of 28 league games with the Tel Aviv-based team.

=== Partizan ===
On 24 July 2013, Djemba-Djemba signed a two-year contract with Serbian side Partizan. He made his debut in a Champions League qualifying match away to Ludogorets Razgrad on 31 July 2013, coming on as a substitute in the 64th minute. However, Djemba-Djemba hardly played for Partizan during the first half of the season. The club's signing of Nikola Drinčić on 20 December meant that Djemba-Djemba became surplus to requirements and his contract was terminated on 23 December 2013.

Djemba-Djemba once went on three month unpaid at the club.

=== St Mirren ===
On 5 February 2014, Djemba-Djemba signed a short-term deal with Scottish Premiership club St Mirren. He said he hoped his move to St Mirren can help him gain a place in the Cameroon squad for the 2014 World Cup in Brazil. Upon joining the club, manager Danny Lennon described Djemba-Djemba as the club's biggest signing.

Djemba-Djemba made his debut for the club, in the fifth round of the Scottish Cup, as St Mirren lost 2–1 against Dundee United. After making just three appearances in all competitions, he was released by the club at the end of the season and also failed to secure a place on the Cameroon squad for the world cup.

=== Chennaiyin ===
In October 2014, Djemba-Djemba signed a short-term deal with Indian Super League club Chennaiyin.

=== Persebaya ISL ===
In February 2015, Djemba-Djemba signed for Indonesian Super League club Persebaya ISL. Before he could make a debut, the league was cancelled following FIFA's sanction on Indonesia for governmental intervention.

=== Later career ===
In 2016 Djemba-Djemba joined French fifth-tier club Châteaubriant.

In September 2021, he announced his retirement from playing professional football.

== International career ==
Djemba-Djemba was a member of the Cameroon national team that won the 2002 African Nations Cup and finished as runners-up to France at the 2003 FIFA Confederations Cup. While in the Confederations Cup, Djemba-Djemba stated that he was the last person to have a conversation with Marc-Vivien Foé before Foé collapsed on the pitch and later died in the hospital. He also appeared at the 2002 FIFA World Cup. However, Djemba-Djemba was not included for the 2010 FIFA World Cup, due to managerial differences. Despite his attempt to make the Cameroon squad for the 2014 World Cup, Djemba-Djemba was not included in the 28-man provisional World Cup squad and thus missing out on the World Cup under the management of Volker Finke.

== Personal life ==
Djemba-Djemba was born in Douala, Cameroon. He holds Cameroonian and French nationalities. He acquired French nationality by naturalization on 17 October 2001.

He was declared bankrupt following his move from Manchester United to Aston Villa in 2007.

Djemba-Djemba was married and fathered four children before being divorced. He is a Christian.

== Honours ==
Manchester United

- FA Cup: 2003–04
- FA Community Shield: 2003

Cameroon

- African Cup of Nations: 2002
- FIFA Confederations Cup runner up: 2003
