= Mads Timm =

Danish footballer and coach (born 1984)

Personal information
- Full name: Mads Timm
- Date of birth: 31 October 1984 (age 41)
- Place of birth: Odense, Denmark
- Height: 1.85 m (6 ft 1 in)
- Position: Forward

Youth career
- Agedrup/Fjordager IF
- Odense
- 2000–2002: Manchester United

Senior career*
Years	Team	Apps	(Gls)
2002–2006	Manchester United	0	(0)
2004	→ Viking (loan)	4	(1)
2005	→ Lyn (loan)	1	(0)
2006	→ Walsall (loan)	12	(1)
2006–2008	Odense	47	(7)
2008–2009	Lyngby	7	(0)

International career
2000	Denmark U16	3	(1)
2000	Denmark U17	6	(1)
2001	Denmark U19	2	(1)
2003–2004	Denmark U20	7	(1)
- * Club domestic league appearances and goals

Mads Timm (born 31 October 1984) is a Danish retired footballer who last played as a forward for Lyngby Boldklub.

== Playing career ==
Spending his youth years at Odense, Timm joined English club Manchester United in the Premier League in 2000. He made his first team debut in a Champions League group stage defeat against Maccabi Haifa in October 2002. He was not able to secure a place in the first team at United, and he spent some time on loan at Norwegian club Viking, scoring the first ever goal at their new Viking Stadion, as well as at English Football League club Walsall, where he scored once against Chesterfield.

In March 2005, Timm was sentenced to 12 months in a young offenders' institute for dangerous driving, after teammate Callum Flanagan's car hit another vehicle while he and Timm were racing each other on a public road. Although United sacked Flanagan after the incident, Timm was allowed to remain with the club.

On 24 May 2006, Manchester United released a statement saying that Timm, along with six other players, had been released by the club, and on 1 June 2006, Timm returned to his Danish childhood club Odense on a three-year contract. In an interview on the Danish television station TV2, the coach from Odense stated that Timm needed a second chance.

Timm had some success at Odense, and he was called up to the Danish national team in October 2007. However, he failed to keep his place in the Odense side, and he was released from the club on 15 August 2008 by mutual consent. On 25 August 2008, Lyngby Boldklub announced that they had signed a one-year contract with Timm.

On 16 August 2009, he retired from professional football because of injuries and lack of motivation. In 2011, he played as an amateur with Danish football club Kerteminde.

== Honours ==
OB

- Danish Cup: 2006–07
