= Mwape Miti =

Zambian footballer (born 1973)

Personal information
- Date of birth: 24 May 1973 (age 53)
- Place of birth: Zambia
- Height: 1.82 m (6 ft 0 in)
- Position: Forward

Senior career*
Years	Team	Apps	(Gls)
- Mulungushi Chiefs
1995–1997	Power Dynamos		
1997–2006	OB	246	(109)

International career
1995–2000	Zambia	33	(4)
- * Club domestic league appearances and goals

Mwape Miti (born 24 May 1973) is a Zambian former professional footballer who played as a striker.

He has played 246 matches and scored 109 goals for his team Odense Boldklub, having joined them in the summer of 1997 from Power Dynamos. Prior to that he played for Mulungushi Chiefs. In the 2003–04 season he became joint top league goalscorer with 19 goals. He retired in 2006.

Miti had 33 caps for the Zambia national team and was part of Zambia squad at the 1996 and 2000 Africa Cup of Nations tournaments.

In 2012, he was selected to Odense BKs all-time top-11 "De største striber" (The greatest "stripes") by OBs fans.

== Honours ==
OB

- Danish Cup: 2001–02
