= Timmi Johansen =

Danish footballer (born 1987)

Personal information
- Full name: Timmi Hvidtfeldt Johansen
- Date of birth: 8 May 1987 (age 39)
- Place of birth: Rødovre, Denmark
- Height: 1.80 m (5 ft 11 in)
- Position: Left back

Youth career
- 1997–2005: Hvidovre

Senior career*
Years	Team	Apps	(Gls)
2005–2006	Hvidovre	23	(0)
2006–2009	Heerenveen	10	(0)
2008–2009	→ OB (loan)	0	(0)
2009–2013	OB	4	(0)
2011	→ Viborg (loan)	10	(0)
2013–2015	Stabæk	35	(1)
2015–2017	Næsby	8	(0)
2017–2018	Marienlyst	19	(0)
Total		109	(1)

International career
2005–2006	Denmark U19	7	(0)
2006	Denmark U20	2	(0)
2006–2008	Denmark U21	12	(0)
- * Club domestic league appearances and goals

Timmi Hvidtfeldt Johansen (born 8 May 1987) is a Danish former professional footballer. He played eleven games for the Denmark national under-21 football team. He played youth football with Hvidovre IF, before moving to SC Heerenveen in 2006.

== Career ==
On 5 April 2013, Johansen signed for Adeccoligaen side Stabæk, terminating his contract with the club on 20 February 2015.

On 5 March 2015, he signed for Næsby. In November 2017, it was announced that Johansen had signed with BK Marienlyst in the Danish 2nd Division.

On 8 January 2018, Johansen announced his retirement from football.
