= Niels Thorborg =

Danish businessman

Niels Thorborg (born February 19, 1964) is the chairman of the Danish football club Odense Boldklub. He is also the former richest person on Funen with a fortune of 3.1 billion Danish kroner.

He is also the owner of the Danish company L'EASY.

Niels Thorborg received negative publicity due to Dinex’s ongoing business with Russian company Kamaz following the Russian invasion of Ukraine on February 24, 2022. The criticism stems from Dinex’s (now discontinued) sale of emission systems to Kamaz, which is known for its production of lorries for commercial and military use. The emission systems sold, however, were not suited for use in military vehicle due to their specific environmental standards, and Dinex has not been supplying products for military use for the past 10-15 years.
