= Bechara (footballer) =

Brazilian footballer (born 1976)

Personal information
- Full name: Bechara Jalkh Leonardo Oliveira
- Date of birth: 25 February 1976 (age 50)
- Place of birth: Fortaleza, Brazil
- Height: 1.82 m (5 ft 11 1/2 in)
- Position: Midfielder

Senior career*
Years	Team	Apps	(Gls)
- Ceará
–1998	Santos FC	5	(1)
1999	Fortaleza	4	(2)
2000–01	São Caetano	12	(5)
2003	Marília		
- Club América
2004	Portuguesa		
2004–05	Al-Ahli		
2005	Aalesund	7	(5)
2006–2008	OB	37	(8)
2008	Vejle	2	(0)
- * Club domestic league appearances and goals as of 19 October 2008

Bechara Jalkh Leonardo Oliveira (born 25 February 1976), or just Bechara, is a Brazilian professional football midfielder, who last played for the Danish Superliga side Vejle Boldklub.

== Career ==
On 1 February 2008, Bechara moved from OB to Vejle Boldklub on a free transfer and signed a 3-year contract running from 1 July 2008 in November 2008 was released by Vejle.

== Honours ==
OB

- Danish Cup: 2006–07
