= Peter Utaka =

Nigerian footballer (born 1984)

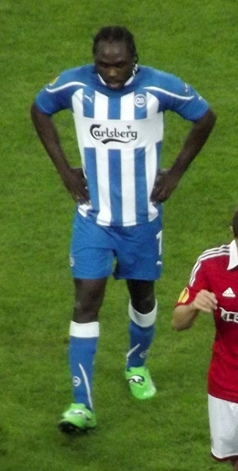
- Utaka with OB in 2011

Personal information
- Full name: Peter Maduabuchi Utaka
- Date of birth: 12 February 1984 (age 42)
- Place of birth: Enugu, Nigeria
- Height: 1.79 m (5 ft 10 in)
- Position: Forward

Team information
- Current team: Tochigi City FC
- Number: 90

Youth career
- 1997: UNTH Nigeria
- 1999–2000: Dinamo Zagreb
- 2000–2004: UNTH Nigeria

Senior career*
Years	Team	Apps	(Gls)
2003–2004	Maasmechelen	35	(17)
2004–2007	Westerlo	73	(12)
2007–2008	Royal Antwerp	46	(26)
2008–2012	OB	108	(52)
2012–2013	Dalian Aerbin	43	(27)
2013–2014	Beijing Guoan	25	(8)
2014	→ Shanghai Shenxin (loan)	12	(2)
2015–2016	Shimizu S-Pulse	28	(9)
2016	→ Sanfrecce Hiroshima (loan)	33	(19)
2017	Sanfrecce Hiroshima	0	(0)
2017	→ FC Tokyo (loan)	25	(8)
2018	Vejle Boldklub	6	(0)
2018	Tokushima Vortis	18	(6)
2019	Ventforet Kofu	41	(21)
2020–2022	Kyoto Sanga	109	(52)
2023–2024	Ventforet Kofu	51	(16)
2025–	Tochigi City FC	28	(9)

International career
2010–2011	Nigeria	8	(3)
- * Club domestic league appearances and goals as of 1 January 2026

Peter Maduabuchi Utaka (born 12 February 1984) is a Nigerian professional footballer who plays as a forward for J3 promoted club, Tochigi City FC. He is the younger brother of fellow professional footballer John Utaka.

== Club career ==
=== Early career ===
Born in Enugu, Nigeria, Utaka moved to Croatia as a 16-year-old to play for Dinamo Zagreb after trying his luck at Ismaily where his older brother John was a cult figure. In 2003, he moved to Belgium from Dinamo and signed for K. Patro Eisden Maasmechelen of the 2nd division. KVC Westerlo moved to sign him the following season, and in his first season in the top flight and the transfer was worth €250,000.

=== Royal Antwerpen ===
Utaka joined Royal Antwerp FC in January 2007 where he became a first team regular, and he helped Antwerp qualify for the playoffs, finishing second. He also emerged top scorer with 22 goals and capped hs glorious season, winning the Best Striker's Award. He also put more gloss on his breath-taking performance that season, claiming the Most Valuable Player's award over eight times, making him one of the most feared strikers in Belgium. On 30 August 2008, it was announced that Utaka would join Danish club OB. for an undisclosed fee.

=== Odense Boldklub ===
Utaka joined Danish side OB in 2008. In his first season, he finished joint fourth place on the scorers list, while he led all scorers in his second season. In the 2009–10 Danish Superliga he finished with 18 goals in 33 matches, the first time in five years an OB player was top scorer in the league (last was Steffen Højer in 2004-05 with 20 goals).

Utaka stayed in OB for three and a half season winning three silver medals in his first three seasons in the Danish Superliga. He also represented the club in both UEFA Europa League and the 2011–12 Champions League qualifying phase scoring a total of nine goals in 22 European matches for the club.

=== Dalian Aerbin ===
In January 2012, Utaka moved to Chinese Super League club Dalian Aerbin. He scored 20 goals in 28 games in his first season. He also scored 11 consecutive fixtures to establish a new C-league record.

=== Beijing Guoan ===
He transferred to Beijing Guoan on 9 July 2013 in a €2 million transfer which made him the most expensive international signing in the history of the club. He scored 15 goals in 36 appearances in all competitions for the club, before he was loaned to Shanghai Shenxin during summer transfers in 2014, managing to score only four times in thirteen appearances in all competitions for the Shanghai outfit.

=== Shimizu S-Pulse ===
In January 2015, Utaka transferred to J1 League-club Shimizu S-Pulse. The club faced a difficult season that year as they were battling relegation. At the end of the season, Utaka scored nine goals in 29 appearances, and the club ended up being seventeenth-placed, thus relegated into the J2 League.

=== Sanfrecce Hiroshima ===
The next year he was loaned to J1 League defending champions Sanfrecce Hiroshima. He scored his first goal for the club in the Japanese Super Cup final, in a 3–1 win against Gamba Osaka. Utaka bagged his first goal in the J1 League on 12 March, scoring a 67th-minute penalty against Shonan Bellmare in a 2–2 draw at home. He scored his next in a 5–1 away win against Omiya Ardija, scoring the opening in the 22nd minute.

=== FC Tokyo ===
After being bought by Sanfrecce Hiroshima, he was immediately loaned to FC Tokyo in March 2017. He scored four goals in his first three matches for the J1 League-club even though he started all of the matches on the bench. He represented the club 33 times and scored ten goals before he returned to Sanfrecce Hiroshima and his contract expired.

=== Vejle Boldklub ===
In February 2018, free agent Utaka trialled with Danish side Vejle Boldklub in Turkey, where the club was on a training camp. Utaka's agent Lucas Chang Jin was co-owner of Vejle Boldklub who at that time was topping the league table in the Danish second tier. On 14 February 2018, the club announced that Utaka had signed a contract with Vejle until the summer of 2018.

=== Tokushima Vortis ===
On 2018, Tokushima Vortis signed Peter Utaka mid-season.

=== Ventforet Kofu ===
Utaka signed to J2 club Ventforet Kofu ahead of the 2019 season.

=== Kyoto Sanga ===
On 23 December 2019, Utaka officially transferred to Kyoto Sanga FC ahead of the 2020 season. He helped the team to win promotion for the J1 League after the club's 12-year absence from it. He left the club after three years at Kyoto, playing his last match coming as a substitute on the 2022 J1/J2 promotion/relegation match, in which Kyoto eventually drew with Roasso Kumamoto, guaranteeing Kyoto the permanence on the J1.

=== Return to Ventforet Kofu ===
On 30 December 2022, Utaka was announced by Ventforet Kofu as a new signing for the 2023 season, in his second stint with the Yamanashi-based club, returning to them after four seasons.

=== Tochigi City ===
On 27 March 2025, Utaka was announce official transfer to J3 promoted club, Tochigi City FC for 2025 season.

== International career ==
On 21 September 2009, national coach Shaibu Amodu selected Utaka for the Nigeria national team. Utaka made his debut for Nigeria months later in a 5–2 home win over Congo DR on 3 March 2010, despite only getting his call up late after the NFF called his mother looking for him. He scored the first goal and assisted on the second. He scored twice in a Africa Cup of Nations qualification match against Ethiopia. His first goal of the match was the fastest goal in the qualifications for the season, scoring a goal after just 29 seconds into the match.

== Career statistics ==
=== Club ===
As of match played 6 May 2025.

Appearances and goals by club, season and competition
Club	Season	League			National cup (Note: Includes Danish Cup, Chinese FA Cup, Emperor's Cup)		League cup (Note: Includes J.League Cup)		Continental		Other		Total	
Club	Season	Division	Apps	Goals	Apps	Goals	Apps	Goals	Apps	Goals	Apps	Goals	Apps	Goals
Maasmechelen	2003–04	Belgian Second Division	32	16	0	0	—		—		—		32	16
Maasmechelen	2004–05	Belgian Second Division	3	1	0	0	—		—		—		3	1
Maasmechelen	Total		35	17	0	0	—		—		—		35	17
Westerlo	2004–05	Belgian First Division	24	4	1	0	—		—		—		25	4
Westerlo	2005–06	Belgian First Division	30	5	0	0	—		—		—		30	5
Westerlo	2006–07	Belgian First Division	19	3	0	0	—		—		—		19	3
Westerlo	Total		73	12	1	0	—		—		—		74	12
Antwerp	2006–07	Belgian Second Division	12	4	0	0	—		—		—		12	4
Antwerp	2007–08	Belgian Second Division	34	22	0	0	—		—		—		34	22
Antwerp	Total		46	26	0	0	—		—		—		46	26
Odense BK	2008–09	Danish Superliga	27	12	0	0	—		—		—		27	12
Odense BK	2009–10	Danish Superliga	33	18	3	4	—		3 (Note: Appearances in UEFA Europa League)	2	—		39	24
Odense BK	2010–11	Danish Superliga	32	14	1	0	—		10	6	—		43	20
Odense BK	2011–12	Danish Superliga	16	8	0	0	—		9 (Note: Three appearances in UEFA Champions League, six appearances and one goal in UEFA Europa League)	1	—		25	9
Odense BK	Total		108	52	4	4	—		22	9	—		134	65
Dalian Aerbin	2012	Chinese Super League	28	20	1	0	—		—		—		29	20
Dalian Aerbin	2013	Chinese Super League	15	7	0	0	—		—		—		15	7
Dalian Aerbin	Total		43	27	1	0	—		—		—		44	27
Beijing Guoan	2013	Chinese Super League	12	7	3	4	—		0	0	—		15	11
Beijing Guoan	2014	Chinese Super League	13	1	0	0	—		7 (Note: Appearances in AFC Champions League)	3	—		20	4
Beijing Guoan	Total		25	8	3	4	—		7	3	—		35	15
Shanghai Shenxin (loan)	2014	Chinese Super League	12	2	1	2	—		—		—		13	4
Shimizu S-Pulse	2015	J1 League	28	9	0	0	1	0	—		—		29	9
Sanfrecce Hiroshima	2016	J1 League	33	19	1	1	2	0	2	0	1 (Note: Appearance in Japanese Super Cup)	1	39	21
FC Tokyo (loan)	2017	J1 League	25	8	0	0	8	2	—		—		33	10
Vejle BK	2017–18	Danish 1st Division	6	0	0	0	—		—		—		6	0
Tokushima Vortis	2018	J2 League	18	6	0	0	—		—		—		18	6
Ventforet Kofu	2019	J2 League	40	20	0	0	—		—		1 (Note: Appearance in J1 Entry play-offs)	1	41	21
Kyoto Sanga	2020	J2 League	40	22	0	0	—		—		—		40	22
Kyoto Sanga	2021	J2 League	40	21	0	0	—		—		—		40	21
Kyoto Sanga	2022	J1 League	29	9	1	0	2	0	—		1	0	33	9
Kyoto Sanga	Total		109	52	1	0	2	0	—		1	0	113	52
Ventforet Kofu	2023	J2 League	40	12	3	0	—		6	3	1	1	50	16
Ventforet Kofu	2024	J2 League	34	8	2	3	2	0	—		—		38	11
Ventforet Kofu	Total		74	20	5	3	2	0	6	3	1	1	88	27
Tochigi City FC	2025	J3 League	4	1	0	0	—		—		—		4	1
Career total			801	318	33	20	15	2	37	15	4	3	890	358

=== International ===
Appearances and goals by national team and year
National team	Year	Apps	Goals
Nigeria	2010	1	1
Nigeria	2011	7	2
Total		8	3

Scores and results list Nigeria's goal tally first, score column indicates score after each Utaka goal.

List of international goals scored by Peter Utaka
No.	Date	Venue	Opponent	Score	Result	Competition	Ref.
1	3 March 2010	Moshood Abiola National Stadium, Abuja, Nigeria	DR Congo	1-0	5-2	Friendly	
2	27 March 2011	Moshood Abiola National Stadium, Abuja, Nigeria	Ethiopia	1-0	4-0	2012 Africa Cup of Nations qualification	
3	27 March 2011	Moshood Abiola National Stadium, Abuja, Nigeria	Ethiopia	2-0	4-0	2012 Africa Cup of Nations qualification	

== Honours ==
Sanfrecce Hiroshima

- Japanese Super Cup: 2016

Individual

- Belgian Second Division top goalscorer: 2007–08
- Danish Superliga top goalscorer: 2009–10
- Chinese FA Cup top goalscorer: 2013
- J.League top goalscorer: 2016
