= Atle Roar Håland =

Norwegian footballer (born 1977)

Personal information
- Date of birth: 26 July 1977 (age 49)
- Place of birth: Kvinesdal Municipality, Norway
- Height: 1.87 m (6 ft 2 in)
- Position: Defender

Senior career*
Years	Team	Apps	(Gls)
- Kvinesdal IL
1997–1998	Vålerenga	0	(0)
1999–2000	Cleveland State University	?	(?)
2001–2003	Mandalskameratene	90	(11)
2004–2007	Start	100	(9)
2008–2011	OB	113	(3)
2011–2013	AGF	34	(0)

International career^{‡}
2006	Norway	1	(0)

Managerial career
- 2018: Start (head developer)
- 2019–2021: Start (director of sports)
- 2019: Start (interim assistant)
- * Club domestic league appearances and goals as of 03 June 2013 ‡ National team caps and goals as of 14 November 2007

Atle Roar Håland (born 26 July 1977) is a retired Norwegian football centreback.

Around 1997, he played for Vålerenga IF. Before joining IK Start in 2004, he had been crucial to FK Mandalskameratene's success in the 1. divisjon the previous year. Håland later played more than 5 years in the Danish Superliga for OB Odense and AGF Aarhus before he retired in 2013 due to an injury.

Håland made his debut for Norway in a March 2006 friendly match against Senegal. He has not played any international matches since.

After retiring, Håland was hired by Football Association of Norway's district association in Agder. In 2018 season he became head of player development in IK Start. In 2019 he changed job title to "executive director of sports", working closely with the director of sports Tor-Kristian Karlsen. In the spring of 2019 Håland acted as interim assistant coach of the men's team. When Tor-Kristian Karlsen left in 2020, Håland became director of sports. He resigned as such in 2021, following the sacking of manager Johannes Hardarson.
