= Esben Hansen =

Danish footballer (born 1981)

Personal information
- Full name: Esben Mathias Rejnholdt Hansen
- Date of birth: 10 August 1981 (age 45)
- Place of birth: Nykøbing Falster, Denmark
- Height: 1.86 m (6 ft 1 in)
- Position: Midfielder

Youth career
- B 1921

Senior career*
Years	Team	Apps	(Gls)
–2002	Nykøbing FA		
2002–2007	OB	169	(7)
2007	1. FC Kaiserslautern	8	(0)
2008–2010	OB	22	(0)
2009–2010	→ Randers FC (loan)	4	(0)
2010–2011	Lyngby	18	(0)

International career
2003	Denmark U-21	2	(0)
2007	Denmark	1	(0)
- * Club domestic league appearances and goals

Esben Hansen (born 10 August 1981) is a Danish former professional footballer who played as a midfielder. He made his international debut for the Denmark national team in a game against Liechtenstein on 13 September 2007, when he was named in the starting 11.

== Honours ==
OB

- Danish Cup: 2006–07
