= Jonas Troest =

Danish footballer (born 1985)

Personal information
- Date of birth: 4 March 1985 (age 41)
- Place of birth: Copenhagen, Denmark
- Height: 1.85 m (6 ft 1 in)
- Position: Centre-back

Senior career*
Years	Team	Apps	(Gls)
2002–2004	B.93	35	(1)
2004–2006	Silkeborg	47	(0)
2006–2007	Hannover 96	8	(0)
2007–2010	OB	67	(1)
2010	Konyaspor	1	(0)
2010–2011	OB	2	(0)
2011	→ SønderjyskE (loan)	17	(0)
2012–2014	SønderjyskE	3	(0)
2014	→ AB (loan)	11	(0)
2014–2016	AB	0	(0)
2020–2022	AB Taarnby		

International career
2000–2001	Denmark U-16	5	(0)
2001–2002	Denmark U-17	16	(0)
2004–2006	Denmark U-21	25	(0)
- * Club domestic league appearances and goals

Jonas Troest (born 4 March 1985) is a Danish retired professional footballer, who played as a centre-back. He played 25 matches for the Denmark under-21 national team. He is the older brother of footballer Magnus Troest.

== Career ==
Troest started his senior career in 2002, with B 93 in the secondary Danish 1st Division league. In 2004, he moved to Silkeborg IF in the top-flight Danish Superliga championship. While at Silkeborg, he made his debut for the Denmark under-21 national team in September 2004. He moved abroad to play for Bundesliga club Hannover 96 in January 2006. In May 2006, he was selected to compete for the Denmark under-21 national squad at the 2006 European Under-21 Championship, where he played in all Denmark's three matches.

He signed with Süper Lig club Konyaspor in summer 2010.

He left AB in 2016.

== Honours ==
OB

- Danish Cup: 2006–07
