= Chris Sørensen =

Danish footballer (born 1977)

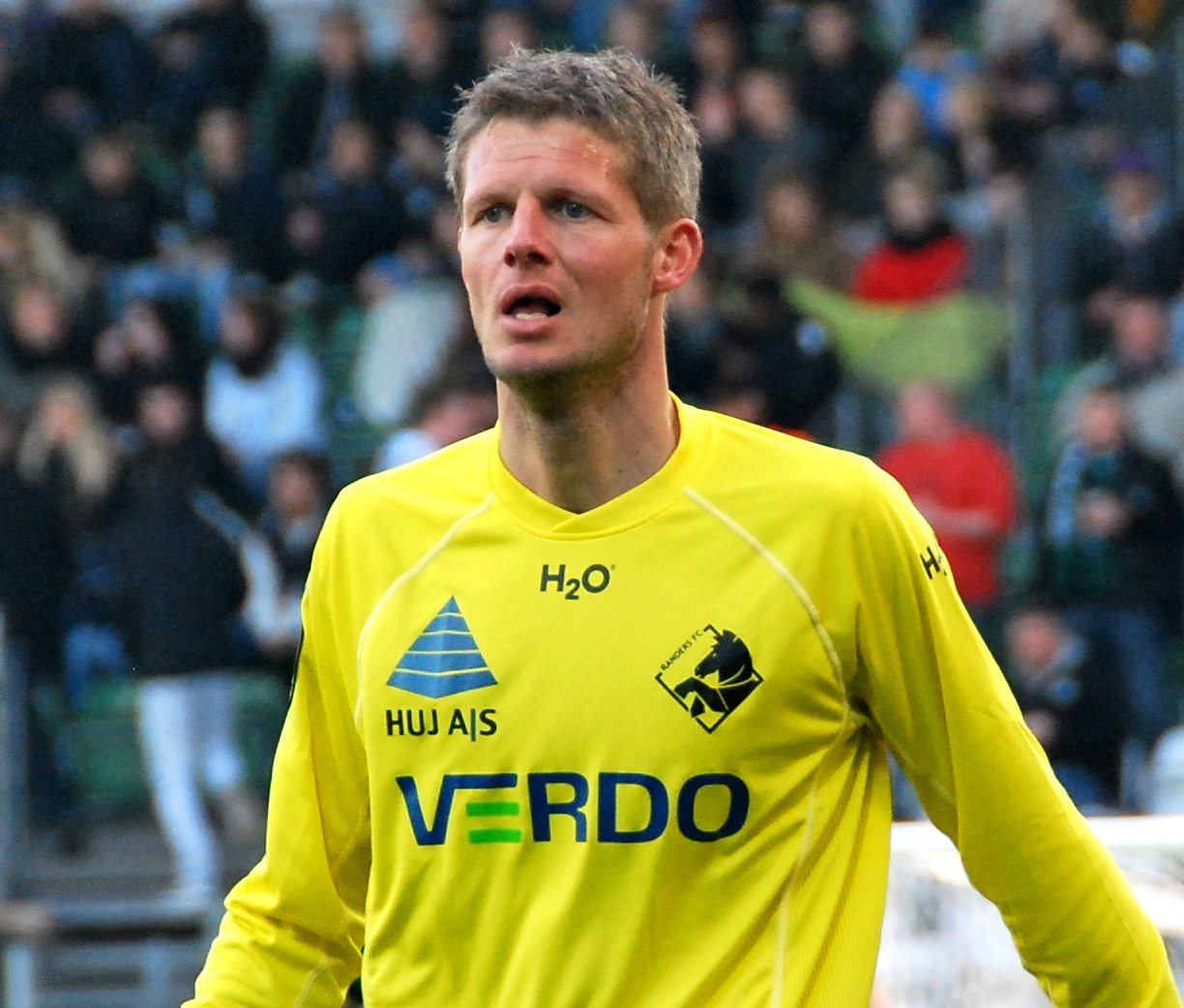
- Sørensen in 2012

Personal information
- Date of birth: 27 July 1977 (age 49)
- Place of birth: Randers, Denmark
- Height: 1.86 m (6 ft 1 in)
- Position: Left back

Youth career
- Randers KFUM
- Randers Freja
- Randers KFUM

Senior career*
| Years | Team | Apps | (Gls) |
| 1998–2002 | Randers Freja | | |
| 2002–2004 | Vejle Bk | 44 | (5) |
| 2004–2012 | OB | 241 | (18) |
| 2012–2014 | Randers FC | 62 | (0) |
| 2014–2017 | Vendsyssel FF | 92 | (3) |
| 2019–2019 | Veddum IF | 1 | (1) |

International career
| 2007–2009 | Denmark | 5 | (0) |
- * Club domestic league appearances and goals

Chris Sørensen (born 27 July 1977) is a retired Danish professional football player. He has played five matches for the Denmark national football team.

== Club career ==
He began playing youth football with amateur club Randers KFUM. He spent some years in the youth teams of Randers Freja, but quickly returned to KFUM. He played in the lower leagues of Danish football with KFUM, before joining Randers Freja under manager Frank Petersen at the age of 21 in 1998. He started as a left winger, but was eventually moved back as left back by Freja manager Ole Fritsen. He played in a Freja team also containing Michael Gravgaard and Svenne Poulsen, and helped the club move from the third-tier Danish 2nd Division to the second-tier Danish 1st Division, before moving to 1st Division rivals Vejle Boldklub under Frank Petersen in 2002.

=== Odense Boldklub ===
He joined Odense Boldklub (OB) on loan in the winter break of the Danish Superliga 2003-04 season, and impressed enough that he was signed on a permanent deal before the season started. He quickly established himself in the starting line-up, playing the last 13 games of that season as OB finished fifth. For the following six seasons, Sørensen would miss only three Superliga games. He helped the club finish third in the Danish Superliga 2005-06, and was named for the 2006 "Danish Team of the Year". He was named Ulrik Laursen's vice-team captain, and was part of the OB team which won the 2007 Danish Cup Final. He was again named for the 2007 "Danish Team of the Year".

In November 2007, he received his first red card of his OB career in a game against Randers FC. He was evicted for intervening in a confrontation between OB's Norwegian Bengt Sæternes and Randers' Ghanaian Issah Ahmed by stating that "this is Denmark", which the referee deemed "indecent language" towards Ahmed. Sørensen stated that he did not have any racistic intention but wanted to end the confrontation which he found an annoying pause in the game, and had finished the sentence "and we clearly don't speak the same language". The explanation was accepted by the Danish Football Association, who did not impose any additional punishment except from the one-game suspension due to the red card.

When Laursen left OB in the winter 2007, Sørensen declined to become new team captain, settling as vice-captain to Esben Hansen. He eventually established himself as captain during Hansen's prolonged absence from the team and subsequent loan deal in the summer 2009. Sørensen helped OB finish second in the Danish Superliga 2008-09 and Danish Superliga 2009-10 seasons.

=== Randers FC ===
In the start of 2012 he signed a 2 year long contract with Randers FC.

== International career ==
Sørensen was called up for the Denmark League XI national football team, to play a number of unofficial national team games in the Hong Kong in January 2006, by national team manager Morten Olsen. He was hospitalized due to dehydration after the first game, but returned to the team for the third and last game of the tour. He was again called up for the League XI tours in January 2007, 2008, and 2009, playing a combined total seven games for the team.

In October 2007, he was included by Olsen in the A national team, and made his debut in the 3–1 win against Latvia in the UEFA Euro 2008 qualification tournament. He played a further two qualification games in November 2007. He played his fourth national team game in a row in February 2008, before he was dropped from the team in favour of Thomas Rasmussen. He returned to the national team in February 2009, playing his fifth game. He was called up again in August 2009, but had to pull out of the squad injured.

In July 2017, Sørensen was part of the Danish squad for the first-ever Star Sixes tournament at the O2 Arena. Scoring four goals en route to the final, he ended up being voted Star of the Tournament ahead of Míchel Salgado, Robert Pires and Gilberto Silva. Denmark lost the final against France 1-2.

== Honours ==
OB

- Danish Cup: 2006–07
