= Hans Henrik Andreasen =

Danish footballer and manager (born 1979)

Personal information
- Full name: Hans Henrik Andreasen
- Date of birth: 10 January 1979 (age 47)
- Place of birth: Ringkøbing, Denmark
- Height: 1.83 m (6 ft 0 in)
- Position: Midfielder

Team information
- Current team: Esbjerg fB (youth coach)

Youth career
- Janderup BS
- Varde

Senior career*
Years	Team	Apps	(Gls)
1998–2005	Esbjerg fB	186	(20)
2005–2007	Greuther Fürth	49	(6)
2007–2013	OB	166	(37)
2013–2015	Esbjerg fB	67	(10)
2016	Hobro	9	(1)
2016–2017	Ringkøbing	34	(7)

International career
1998–1999	Denmark U19	2	(0)
1998–2001	Denmark U21	9	(1)
2010	Denmark	1	(0)

Managerial career
- 2016–2017: Ringkøbing (player-assistant)
- 2018: Sydvest 05 (assistant)
- 2018–2019: Sydvest 05
- 2022: Glejbjerg SF
- 2023–: Esbjerg fB (youth coach)
- * Club domestic league appearances and goals as of 27 December 2017

Hans Henrik Andreasen also known as HH (born 10 January 1979) is a Danish former professional footballer and current working as a youth coach at Esbjerg fB.

== Club career ==
=== Esbjerg fB & Greuther Fürth ===
He played for German side SpVgg Greuther Fürth between 2005 and 2007. Before playing abroad in Fürth, he broke through in Danish football, playing for Esbjerg fB. He was one of the players who established Esbjerg in the Danish Superliga, in the first five years of the new millennium. After his transfer to Germany, he was a regular in the starting lineup.

=== OB ===
In the summer of 2007, he returned to Denmark to play for Odense Boldklub. For a midfielder, he was a prolific goal scorer, and he went on to score 47 goals i 211 appearances for OB. 37 were scored in his 166 matches in the domestic league, before he moved back to Esbjerg in January 2013.

=== Ringkøbing IF ===
After leaving Hobro in the summer 2016, Andreasen signed for amateur club Ringkøbing IF as a playing assistant manager. He left the club at the end of 2017.

== International career ==
Andreasen has played 11 matches, in which he scored two goals, for the Danish national youth teams. He made his debut for the Danish national team on 17 November 2010, in the friendly match against Czech Republic.

== Coaching career ==
On 8 March 2020, Andreasen was appointed assistant manager of Danish 2nd Division club FC Sydvest 05. On 25 June 2018, he was then promoted to manager of the club. After a bad start to the 2019–20 season, with 12 points in 13 games, Andreason was fired on 21 October 2019.

In February 2022 it was confirmed, that Andreasen had been appointed manager of Danish amateur club Glejbjerg SF. In September 2023, he was appointed as youth coach at his former club, Esbjerg fB.
