= 2012–13 Odense Boldklub season =

Odense Boldklub
2012–13 season
- Chairman: Niels Thorborg
- Manager: Troels Bech
- Stadium: TRE-FOR Park
- Danish Superliga: 10th
- DBU Pokalen: Quarter-final
- Top goalscorer: League: Emil Larsen (7); All: Marcus Pedersen (11)
- Highest home attendance: 9,575 vs Aalborg BK (26 August 2012)
- Lowest home attendance: 4,116 vs FC Nordsjælland (5 October 2012)
- Average home league attendance: 7,395
Home colours	Away colours	Third colours

The 2012–13 season was Odense Boldklub's 125th anniversary year. They started this season with a new manager, Troels Bech. Odense Boldklub placed 4th in the Danish Superliga after 19 rounds played.

== Squad statistics ==
No.	Pos.	Name	League		Cup		Total		Discipline	
No.	Pos.	Name	Apps	Goals	Apps	Goals	Apps	Goals	Yellow card	Red card
1	GK	(Denmark) Jesper Christiansen	8	0	0	0	8	0	0	0
2	DF	(Norway) Espen Ruud	16	1	3	0	19	1	2	0
4	MF	(Denmark) Hans Henrik Andreasen	15	1	3	1	18	2	1	0
5	DF	(Denmark) Anders Møller Christensen	17	0	0	0	17	0	4	0
6	MF	(France) Mohammed Diarra	2	0	3	0	5	0	1	0
7	MF	(Denmark) Emil Larsen	15	4	2	0	17	4	0	0
8	MF	(Denmark) Michael Silberbauer	8	1	1	0	9	1	2	0
9	FW	(Denmark) Rasmus Falk Jensen	16	1	2	1	18	2	2	0
10	MF	(Sweden) Andreas Johansson	15	1	3	1	18	1	4	0
11	FW	(Denmark) Morten Skoubo	16	2	1	1	17	3	2	0
14	FW	(Estonia) Hannes Anier	0	0	1	0	1	0	0	0
15	DF	(Denmark) Kasper Larsen	7	0	3	0	10	0	0	0
16	MF	(Denmark) Jacob Schoop	13	1	2	1	15	2	1	0
17	GK	(Denmark) Mads Toppel	7	0	3	0	10	0	0	0
19	FW	(Norway) Marcus Pedersen	8	2	2	5	10	7	2	1
20	DF	(Denmark) Timmi Johansen	0	0	1	0	1	0	0	0
21	MF	(Hungary) Krisztián Vadócz	7	5	1	0	8	5	1	0
22	GK	(Denmark) Nicolai Jørgensen	0	0	0	0	0	0	0	0
23	FW	(Cameroon) Cedric N'Koum	7	0	3	1	10	1	4	0
24	DF	(Denmark) Bashkim Kadrii	16	3	2	0	18	3	0	0
25	MF	(Denmark) Christian Sørensen	1	0	1	0	2	0	0	0
26	DF	(Denmark) Daniel Høegh	13	0	3	0	16	0	3	1

== Danish Superliga ==
=== League table ===
Pos	Team	Pld	W	D	L	GF	GA	GD	Pts	Qualification or relegation
8	SønderjyskE	33	12	5	16	53	57	−4	41	
9	Brøndby	33	9	12	12	39	45	−6	39	
10	OB	33	10	8	15	52	59	−7	38	
11	Horsens (R)	33	8	10	15	31	49	−18	34	Relegation to Danish 1st Division
12	Silkeborg IF (R)	33	8	7	18	38	66	−28	31	Relegation to Danish 1st Division

Source: Danish Football Association (in Danish)
Rules for classification: 1) points; 2) goal difference; 3) number of goals scored.
(R) Relegated

=== Positions by round ===
Round	1	2	3	4	5	6	7	8	9	10	11	12	13	14	15	16	17	18	19	20	21	22	23	24	25	26	27	28	29	30	31	32	33
OB	5	6	6	4	3	2	4	4	5	5	6	6	6	6	6	5	6	4	4	4	5	5	6	5	4	5	5	5	6	7	8	9	10

Updated to match(es) played on 20 May 2013. Source: kicker.de

=== Matches ===
==== Round 1: Brøndby IF vs OB ====
Brøndby IF vs Odense BK was the club's opening match of the 2012-13 Danish Superliga season. The match was played at Brøndby Stadium, with a very low attendance from the home crowd. The Brøndby manager Auri Skarbalius chose to bench Michael Krohn-Dehli, because of an extended vacation following the UEFA Euro 2012 tournament. OB took the lead after 17 minutes with a goal by Jacob Schoop, which was his first goal with the club. Brøndby created more opportunities to score in the second half, and after 78 minutes Clarence Goodson scored, but the referee Lars Christoffersen cancelled the goal because Goodson pushed Daniel Høegh in the back. OB won the opening match 1–0.

15 July 2012
17:00

Brøndby IF	0-1	Odense BK
	Report	Schoop 17'

Brøndby Stadium, Brøndby
Attendance: 9,102
Referee: Lars Christoffersen

Brøndby IF	Odense BK

GK	1	(Denmark) Michael Tørnes
RB	2	(Denmark) Anders Randrup		(substituted off) 85'
CB	4	(Denmark) Daniel Stenderup
CB	7	(United States) Clarence Goodson (c)
LB	19	(Denmark) Daniel Norouzi
RM	17	(Denmark) Jens Stryger Larsen	(yellow card) 24'	(substituted off) 57'
CM	26	(Denmark) Mike Jensen	(yellow card) 74'
CM	24	(Denmark) Franck Semou
LM	15	(Denmark) Mikkel Thygesen
CF	9	(Denmark) Simon Makienok
CF	18	(Denmark) Nicolaj Agger		(substituted off) 74'
Substitutions:
MF	23	(Denmark) Michael Krohn-Dehli		(substituted on) 57'
FW	14	(Nigeria) Oke Akpoveta		(substituted on) 74'
DF	20	(Denmark) Dario Dumic		(substituted on) 85'
Manager:
(Lithuania) Auri Skarbalius

GK	1	(Denmark) Jesper Christiansen
RB	2	(Norway) Espen Ruud
CB	5	(Denmark) Anders Møller Christensen (c)
CB	26	(Denmark) Daniel Høegh
LB	24	(Denmark) Bashkim Kadrii
RM	10	(Sweden) Andreas Johansson	(yellow card) 28'
CM	16	(Denmark) Jacob Schoop		(substituted off) 83'
CM	4	(Denmark) Hans Henrik Andreasen		(substituted off) 83'
LM	7	(Denmark) Emil Larsen		(substituted off) 64'
CF	9	(Denmark) Rasmus Falk Jensen
CF	21	(Iceland) Rúrik Gíslason
Substitutions:
MF	25	(Denmark) Christian Sørensen		(substituted on) 64'
DF	8	(Norway) Tore Reginiussen		(substituted on) 83'
FW	11	(Denmark) Morten Skoubo		(substituted on) 83'
Manager:
(Denmark) Troels Bech

==== Round 2: OB vs Randers FC ====
Odense BK vs Randers FC was Odense's second match of the season.

22 July 2012
14:00

Odense BK	0-1	Randers FC
	Report	Rise 60'

TRE-FOR Park, Odense
Attendance: 7,123
Referee: Mads-Kristoffer Kristoffersen

Odense BK	Randers FC

GK	1	(Denmark) Jesper Christiansen
RB	2	(Norway) Espen Ruud
CB	5	(Denmark) Anders Møller Christensen (c)
CB	26	(Denmark) Daniel Høegh
LB	24	(Denmark) Bashkim Kadrii
CM	4	(Denmark) Hans Henrik Andreasen		(substituted off) 72'
CM	16	(Denmark) Jacob Schoop	(yellow card) 56'	(substituted off) 61'
RM	10	(Sweden) Andreas Johansson	(yellow card) 53'
AM	9	(Denmark) Rasmus Falk Jensen
LM	7	(Denmark) Emil Larsen		(substituted off) 85'
CF	21	(Iceland) Rúrik Gíslason
Substitutions:
MF	18	(Mali) Kalilou Traoré		(substituted on) 61'
FW	11	(Denmark) Morten Skoubo		(substituted on) 72'
DF	8	(Denmark) Tore Reginiussen		(substituted on) 85'
Manager:
(Denmark) Troels Bech

GK	1	(Denmark) David Ousted
RB	4	(Denmark) Johnny Thomsen		(substituted off) 85'
CB	23	(Netherlands) Remco van der Schaaf	(yellow card) 27'
CB	13	(Denmark) Mads Fenger	(yellow card) 27'
LB	15	(Denmark) Chris Sørensen
RM	17	(Denmark) Jonas Kamper
CM	14	(Senegal) Tidiane Sane
CM	3	(Denmark) Christian Keller (c)	(yellow card) 14'
LM	21	(Denmark) Alexander Fischer	(yellow card) 78'
CF	9	(Denmark) Lasse Rise		(substituted off) 68'
CF	11	(Denmark) Ronnie Schwartz		(substituted off) 75'
Substitutions:
FW	8	(United States) Charlie Davies		(substituted on) 68'
FW	33	(Mali) Adama Tamboura		(substituted on) 75'
FW	20	(Denmark) Frank Kristensen		(substituted on) 85'
Manager:
(Northern Ireland) Colin Todd

==== Round 3: FC Nordsjælland vs OB ====
FC Nordsjælland vs Odense BK was Odense's third match of the season. FC Nordsjælland scored in the 16th minute and led for the majority of the match. Odense's Kalilou Traoré scored in the 81st minute, and the matched ended 1-1.

29 July 2012
19:00

FC Nordsjælland	1-1	Odense BK
Christensen 16'	Report	Traoré 81'

Farum Park, Farum
Attendance: 5,736
Referee: Michael Johansen

FC Nordsjælland	Odense BK

GK	1	(Denmark) Jesper Hansen
RB	18	(United States) Michael Parkhurst	(yellow card) 75'	(substituted off) 78'
CB	2	(Denmark) Jores Okore
LB	21	(Croatia) Ivan Runje
RM	17	(Denmark) Søren Christensen
CM	22	(Denmark) Andreas Laudrup		(substituted off) 73'
CM	8	(Denmark) Nicolai Stokholm (c)
CM	6	(Ghana) Enoch Adu
LM	20	(Denmark) Kasper Lorentzen
CF	12	(Sweden) Rawez Lawan		(substituted off) 86'
CF	23	(Croatia) Mario Tičinović
Substitutions:
MF	10	(Denmark) Mikkel Beckmann		(substituted on) 73'
FW	19	(Denmark) Mark Gundelach		(substituted on) 78'
DF	5	(Denmark) Anders Christiansen	(yellow card) 90'	(substituted on) 86'
Manager:
(Denmark) Kasper Hjulmand

GK	1	(Denmark) Jesper Christiansen
RB	2	(Norway) Espen Ruud
CB	5	(Denmark) Anders Møller Christensen (c)	(yellow card) 23'
CB	26	(Denmark) Daniel Høegh
LB	24	(Denmark) Bashkim Kadrii
RM	10	(Sweden) Andreas Johansson	(yellow card) 28'
CM	16	(Denmark) Jacob Schoop		(substituted off) 61'
CM	4	(Denmark) Hans Henrik Andreasen		(substituted off) 61'
LM	7	(Denmark) Emil Larsen		(substituted off) 64'
CF	9	(Denmark) Rasmus Falk Jensen
CF	11	(Denmark) Morten Skoubo		(substituted off) 76'
Substitutions:
MF	18	(Mali) Kalilou Traoré		(substituted on) 61'
MF	21	(Iceland) Rúrik Gíslason		(substituted on) 61'
FW	23	(Cameroon) Cedric N'Koum	(yellow card) 90'	(substituted on) 76'
Manager:
(Denmark) Troels Bech

==== Round 4: Silkeborg IF vs OB ====
Silkeborg IF vs Odense BK took place at Mascot Park in Silkeborg. No goals were scored until the game went into 3 minutes of overtime, when Morten Skoubo scored for OB, ending the match 0-1 for Odense.

3 August 2012
18:30

Silkeborg IF	0-1	Odense BK
	Report	Skoubo 90+3'

Mascot Park, Silkeborg
Attendance: 3,025
Referee: Michael Tykgaard

Silkeborg IF	Odense BK

GK	1	(Denmark) Lasse Heinze
RB	14	(Denmark) Dennis Flinta
CB	26	(Denmark) Thorbjørn Holst
CB	20	(Denmark) Simon Jakobsen
LB	2	(Denmark) Jesper Mikkelsen
CM	20	(Denmark) Frank Hansen
CM	21	(Denmark) Kasper Risgård
RM	11	(Nigeria) Adeola Runsewe
AM	10	(Denmark) Jesper Bech
LM	15	(Denmark) Daniel A. Pedersen		(substituted off) 66'
CF	9	(Germany) Marvin Pourié	(yellow card) 44'
Substitutions:
MF	5	(Denmark) Christopher Poulsen		(substituted on) 66'
Manager:
(Denmark) Keld Bordinggaard

GK	1	(Denmark) Jesper Christiansen
RB	2	(Norway) Espen Ruud
CB	5	(Denmark) Anders Møller Christensen (c)
CB	26	(Denmark) Daniel Høegh
LB	24	(Denmark) Bashkim Kadrii
CM	10	(Sweden) Andreas Johansson		(substituted off) 72'
CM	18	(Mali) Kalilou Traoré		(substituted off) 68'
RM	23	(Cameroon) Cedric N'Koum	(yellow card) 26'	(substituted off) 46'
AM	9	(Denmark) Rasmus Falk Jensen
LM	7	(Denmark) Emil Larsen
CF	21	(Iceland) Rúrik Gíslason	(yellow card) 87'
Substitutions:
MF	16	(Denmark) Jacob Schoop		(substituted on) 46'
FW	11	(Denmark) Morten Skoubo	(yellow card) 88'	(substituted on) 68'
MF	4	(Denmark) Hans Henrik Andreasen		(substituted on) 72'
Manager:
(Denmark) Troels Bech

==== Round 5: OB vs FC Midtjylland ====
Odense BK vs FC Midtjylland was the club's fifth match of the season.

10 August 2012
18:30

Odense BK	2-1	FC Midtjylland
Larsen 76'; Skoubo 85'	Report	Igboun 10'

TRE-FOR Park, Odense
Attendance: 8,785
Referee: Lars Chistoffersen

Odense BK	FC Midtjylland

GK	1	(Denmark) Jesper Christiansen		(substituted off) 41'
RB	2	(Norway) Espen Ruud
CB	5	(Denmark) Anders Møller Christensen (c)
CB	26	(Denmark) Daniel Høegh
LB	24	(Denmark) Bashkim Kadrii
CM	16	(Denmark) Jacob Schoop
CM	18	(Mali) Kalilou Traoré	(yellow card) 63'	(substituted off) 65'
RM	10	(Sweden) Andreas Johansson	(yellow card) 47'	(substituted off) 80'
AM	9	(Denmark) Rasmus Falk Jensen
LM	7	(Denmark) Emil Larsen
CF	21	(Iceland) Rúrik Gíslason
Substitutions:
GK	17	(Mali) Mads Toppel		(substituted on) 41'
MF	4	(Denmark) Hans Henrik Andreasen		(substituted on) 65'
FW	11	(Denmark) Morten Skoubo		(substituted on) 80'
Manager:
(Denmark) Troels Bech

GK	1	(Denmark) Jonas Lössl
RB	3	(Germany) Kolja Afriyie	(yellow card) 44'
CB	32	(Denmark) Kristian Bak Nielsen (c)
CB	21	(Croatia) Erik Sviatchenko
LB	6	(Denmark) Jesper Juelsgård
RM	11	(Denmark) Danny Olsen		(substituted off) 87'
CM	43	(Nigeria) Izunna Uzochukwu	(yellow card) 23'	(substituted off) 88'
CM	8	(Sweden) Petter Andersson
LM	17	(Denmark) Mads Albæk
CF	9	(Denmark) Morten Rasmussen	(yellow card) 5'
CF	44	(Nigeria) Sylvester Igboun	(yellow card) 87'
Substitutions:
DF	2	(Argentina) Santiago Villafañe		(substituted on) 63'
FW	19	(Denmark) Marco Larsen		(substituted on) 87'
FW	39	(Denmark) Jude Nworuh		(substituted on) 88'
Manager:
(Denmark) Glen Riddersholm

==== Round 6: SønderjyskE vs OB ====
SønderjyskE vs Odense BK was the club's sixth match of the season. At the time SønderjyskE and Odense held the second and third seeds in the league respectively. OB won the match 1-2, and moved up to second position within the league.

20 August 2012
19:00

SønderjyskE	1-2	Odense BK
O'Brien 56'	Report	Gíslason 24'; Larsen 52'

Haderslev Fodboldstadion, Haderslev
Attendance: 3,638
Referee: Henning Jensen

SønderjyskE	Odense BK

GK	1	(Denmark) Håkon Opdal
RB	23	(Norway) Jarl André Storbæk
CB	5	(Denmark) Niels Lodberg	(yellow card) 90'
CB	22	(United States) Conor O'Brien
LB	7	(Denmark) Daniel Christensen
RM	17	(Denmark) Lasse Vibe
CM	8	(Denmark) Henrik Hansen		(substituted off) 70'
CM	16	(Denmark) Henrik Bødker
LM	20	(Denmark) Bjørn Paulsen
CF	9	(Denmark) Tommy Bechmann		(substituted off) 59'
CF	10	(Zimbabwe) Quincy Antipas
Substitutions:
MF	19	(Austria) Florian Hart		(substituted on) 59'
MF	6	(Denmark) Thomas Hansen		(substituted on) 70'
Manager:
(Denmark) Lars Søndergaard

GK	17	(Denmark) Mads Toppel
RB	2	(Norway) Espen Ruud
CB	5	(Denmark) Anders Møller Christensen (c)
CB	26	(Denmark) Daniel Høegh
LB	24	(Denmark) Bashkim Kadrii
CM	4	(Denmark) Hans Henrik Andreasen	(yellow card) 35'
CM	16	(Denmark) Jacob Schoop		(substituted off) 88'
RM	23	(Cameroon) Cedric N'Koum	(yellow card) 72'	(substituted off) 77'
AM	9	(Denmark) Rasmus Falk Jensen	(yellow card) 58'
LM	7	(Denmark) Emil Larsen
CF	21	(Iceland) Rúrik Gíslason	(yellow card) 54'
Substitutions:
FW	11	(Denmark) Morten Skoubo		(substituted on) 77'
DF	15	(Denmark) Kasper Larsen		(substituted on) 88'
Manager:
(Denmark) Troels Bech

==== Round 7: OB vs AaB ====
26 August 2012
17:00

Odense BK	0-4	Aalborg BK
	Report	Helenius 2'; Augustinussen 43'; Dalsgaard 44'; Andersen 62'

TRE-FOR Park, Odense
Attendance: 9,575
Referee: Michael Johansen

Odense BK	Aalborg BK

GK	17	(Denmark) Mads Toppel
RB	2	(Norway) Espen Ruud
CB	5	(Denmark) Anders Møller Christensen (c)
CB	26	(Denmark) Daniel Høegh	(red card) 1'
LB	24	(Denmark) Bashkim Kadrii
CM	10	(Sweden) Andreas Johansson		(substituted off) 46'
CM	16	(Denmark) Jacob Schoop		(substituted off) 62'
RM	21	(Iceland) Rúrik Gíslason	(yellow card) 86'
AM	9	(Denmark) Rasmus Falk Jensen		(substituted off) 72'
LM	7	(Denmark) Emil Larsen
CF	11	(Denmark) Morten Skoubo
Substitutions:
DF	15	(Denmark) Kasper Larsen		(substituted on) 46'
MF	18	(Mali) Kalilou Traoré		(substituted on) 62'
MF	4	(Denmark) Hans Henrik Andreasen		(substituted on) 74'
Manager:
(Denmark) Troels Bech

GK	1	(Denmark) Nicolai Larsen
RB	20	(Denmark) Henrik Dalsgaard
CB	5	(Denmark) Kenneth Emil Petersen
CB	4	(Denmark) Lasse Nielsen
LB	3	(Denmark) Jakob Ahlmann Nielsen
RM	14	(Denmark) Mathias Wichmann
CM	9	(Denmark) Thomas Augustinussen (c)
LM	8	(Denmark) Rasmus Würtz	(yellow card) 58'	(substituted off) 72'
RF	17	(Denmark) Kasper Kusk	(yellow card) 34'	(substituted off) 60'
CF	11	(Denmark) Nicklas Helenius
LF	18	(Denmark) Lucas Andersen		(substituted off) 82'
Substitutions:
MF	2	(Denmark) Patrick Kristensen		(substituted on) 60'
MF	23	(Denmark) Nicolaj Thomsen		(substituted on) 72'
FW	29	(Denmark) Rolf Toft		(substituted on) 82'
Manager:
(Denmark) Kent Nielsen

==== Round 8: OB vs FC Copenhagen ====
Odense BK vs FC Copenhagen was the club's eighth match of the season. Before kick-off, Kalilou Traoré was honored in celebration of his last game for OB, after which he would switch to FC Sochaux.

2 September 2012
19:00

Odense BK	2-2	FC København
Johansson 51'; Gíslason 67'	Report	Cornelius 6'; Jørgensen 64'

TRE-FOR Park, Odense
Attendance: 9,439
Referee: Michael Tykgaard

Odense BK	FC Copenhagen

GK	17	(Denmark) Mads Toppel
RB	2	(Norway) Espen Ruud
CB	5	(Denmark) Anders Møller Christensen (c)
CB	15	(Denmark) Kasper Larsen
LB	24	(Denmark) Bashkim Kadrii
CM	10	(Sweden) Andreas Johansson	(substituted off) 76'
CM	16	(Denmark) Jacob Schoop
RM	21	(Iceland) Rúrik Gíslason
AM	9	(Denmark) Rasmus Falk Jensen
LM	7	(Denmark) Emil Larsen
CF	11	(Denmark) Morten Skoubo	(substituted off) 81'
Substitutions:
MF	4	(Denmark) Hans Henrik Andreasen	(substituted on) 76'
FW	19	(Norway) Marcus Pedersen	(substituted on) 81'
Manager:
(Denmark) Troels Bech

GK	21	(Sweden) Johan Wiland (c)
RB	2	(Denmark) Lars Jacobsen
CB	17	(Iceland) Ragnar Sigurðsson
CB	5	(Iceland) Sölvi Ottesen
LB	3	(Sweden) Pierre Bengtsson
RM	30	(Costa Rica) Christian Bolaños
CM	16	(Denmark) Thomas Kristensen
CM	6	(Brazil) Claudemir
LM	18	(Denmark) Nicolai Jørgensen
CF	29	(Denmark) Andreas Cornelius
CF	11	(Brazil) César Santin	(substituted off) 65'
Substitutions:
MF	27	(Denmark) Thomas Delaney	(substituted on) 65'
Manager:
(Belgium) Ariël Jacobs

==== Round 9: Esbjerg fB vs OB ====
14 September 2012
18:30

Esbjerg fB	3-0	Odense BK
Braithwaite 32'; Braithwaite 34'; Lange 61'	Report

Blue Water Arena, Esbjerg
Referee: Jakob Kehlet

Esbjerg fB	Odense BK

GK	1	(Finland) Lukáš Hrádecký
RB	2	(Denmark) Peter Ankersen
CB	4	(Denmark) Jerry Lucena
CB	7	(Denmark) Nikolaj Høgh (c)
LB	19	(Denmark) Jonas Knudsen
RM	17	(Denmark) Jakob Ankersen	(substituted off) 70'
CM	26	(Denmark) Steffen Ernemann
CM	6	(Norway) Magnus Lekven
LM	7	(Denmark) Youssef Toutouh
CF	22	(Denmark) Jesper Lange	(substituted off) 87'
CF	32	(Denmark) Martin Braithwaite	(substituted off) 82'
Substitutions:
FW	8	(Denmark) Kenneth Fabricius	(substituted on) 70'
MI	12	(Denmark) Sebastian Andersen	(substituted on) 82'
FW	10	(The Gambia) Njogu Demba-Nyrén	(substituted on) 87'
Manager:
(Denmark) Jess Thorup

GK	1	(Denmark) Jesper Christiansen
RB	2	(Norway) Espen Ruud
CB	5	(Denmark) Anders Møller Christensen (c)	(yellow card) 36'
CB	26	(Denmark) Daniel Høegh	(yellow card) 25'
LB	24	(Denmark) Bashkim Kadrii
CM	8	(Denmark) Michael Silberbauer
CM	16	(Denmark) Jacob Schoop		(substituted off) 46'
RM	10	(Sweden) Andreas Johansson
AM	9	(Denmark) Rasmus Falk Jensen
LM	7	(Denmark) Emil Larsen
CF	11	(Denmark) Morten Skoubo	(yellow card) 68'	(substituted off) 69'
Substitutions:
FW	23	(Cameroon) Cedric N'Koum		(substituted on) 46'
MF	4	(Denmark) Hans Henrik Andreasen		(substituted on) 64'
FW	19	(Norway) Marcus Pedersen		(substituted on) 69'
Manager:
(Denmark) Troels Bech

==== Round 11: OB vs AGF ====
30 September 2012
17:00

Odense BK	1-2	Aarhus GF
Pedersen 47'	Report	Devdariani 23'; Jóhannsson 45'

TRE-FOR Park, Odense
Attendance: 9,088
Referee: Kenn Hansen

Odense BK	AGF

GK	1	(Denmark) Jesper Christiansen
RB	2	(Norway) Espen Ruud
CB	15	(Denmark) Kasper Larsen
CB	26	(Denmark) Daniel Høegh (c)
LB	24	(Denmark) Bashkim Kadrii
RM	10	(Sweden) Andreas Johansson		(substituted off) 46'
CM	21	(Hungary) Krisztián Vadócz
CM	8	(Denmark) Michael Silberbauer	(yellow card) 73'	(substituted off) 80'
LM	9	(Denmark) Jacob Schoop		(substituted off) 74'
CF	19	(Norway) Marcus Pedersen
CF	9	(Denmark) Rasmus Falk Jensen
Substitutions:
MF	4	(Denmark) Hans Henrik Andreasen		(substituted on) 76'
FW	19	(Norway) Marcus Pedersen		(substituted on) 81'
Manager:
(Denmark) Troels Bech

GK	1	(Denmark) Steffen Rasmussen (c)
RB	2	(Finland) Petri Pasanen	(yellow card) 45'
CB	37	(Denmark) Mikkel Kirkeskov	(yellow card) 85'
CB	18	(France) Arthur Sorin
LB	3	(England) Adam Eckersley
RM	17	(Denmark) Osama Akharraz		(substituted off) 82'
CM	38	(Denmark) Casper Sloth
CM	8	(Denmark) Hjalte Nørregaard		(substituted off) 75'
LM	7	(Denmark) Stephan Petersen
CF	20	(Iceland) Aron Jóhannsson
CF	22	(Georgia (country)) Davit Skhirtladze		(substituted off) 16'
Substitutions:
ST	30	(Georgia (country)) David Devdariani		(substituted on) 16'
MF	10	(Denmark) Martin Jørgensen		(substituted on) 75'
MF	9	(Denmark) Søren Berg		(substituted on) 82'
Manager:
(Denmark) Peter Sørensen

==== Round 13: FC Midtjylland vs OB ====
FC Midtjylland vs Odense BK was the club's 13th match in the season. Krisztián Vadócz scored a goal for OB after 34 minutes. After halftime, OB's Marcus Pedersen received a red card and Izunna Uzochukwu was sent off the pitch after stepping on Krisztián Vadócz's shin. The referee, Lars Christoffersen, added six minutes of overtime, during which Midtjylland scored a goal, ending the match with a tie.

21 October 2012
17:00

FC Midtjylland	1-1	Odense BK
Ipsa 90+7'	Report	Vadócz 34'

MCH Arena, Herning
Referee: Lars Christoffersen

FC Midtjylland	Odense BK

GK	1	(Denmark) Jonas Lössl
RB	3	(Germany) Kolja Afriyie		(substituted off) 74'
CB	32	(Denmark) Kristian Bak Nielsen (c)	(yellow card) 59'
CB	21	(Croatia) Kristijan Ipsa
LB	6	(Denmark) Jesper Juelsgård
RM	11	(Denmark) Danny Olsen		(substituted off) 66'
CM	43	(Nigeria) Izunna Uzochukwu	(yellow card) 51' (yellow-red card) 53'
CM	8	(Sweden) Petter Andersson	(yellow card) 85'
LM	17	(Denmark) Mads Albæk
CF	44	(Nigeria) Sylvester Igboun		(substituted off) 83'
CF	9	(Denmark) Morten Rasmussen
Substitutions:
MF	36	(Nigeria) Rilwan Hassan		(substituted on) 66'
FW	19	(Denmark) Marco Larsen		(substituted on) 74'
DF	18	(Denmark) Erik Sviatchenko		(substituted on) 83'
Manager:
(Denmark) Glen Riddersholm

GK	1	(Denmark) Jesper Christiansen
RB	2	(Norway) Espen Ruud		(substituted off) 90+3'
CB	5	(Denmark) Anders Møller Christensen (c)
CB	26	(Denmark) Daniel Høegh	(yellow card) 6'
LB	24	(Denmark) Bashkim Kadrii
RM	21	(Hungary) Krisztián Vadocz	(yellow card) 90+6'
CM	8	(Denmark) Michael Silberbauer		(substituted off) 78'
CM	10	(Sweden) Andreas Johansson		(substituted off) 85'
LM	7	(Denmark) Emil Larsen
CF	9	(Denmark) Rasmus Falk Jensen
CF	19	(Norway) Marcus Pedersen	(yellow card) 57' (yellow-red card) 64'
Substitutions:
FW	11	(Denmark) Morten Skoubo		(substituted on) 78'
MF	4	(Denmark) Hans Henrik Andreasen		(substituted on) 85'
MF	15	(Denmark) Kasper Larsen		(substituted on) 90+3'
Manager:
(Denmark) Troels Bech

==== Round 15: Brøndby IF vs OB ====
4 November 2012
17:00

Brøndby IF	0-3	Odense BK
	Report	Falk 6'; Larsen 64'; Andreasen 90+3'

Brøndby Stadium, Brøndby
Attendance: 10,590
Referee: Henning Jensen

Brøndby IF	Odense BK

GK	1	(Denmark) Michael Tørnes
RB	2	(Denmark) Anders Randrup		(substituted off) 76'
CB	20	(Denmark) Dario Dumic	(red card) 79'
CB	7	(United States) Clarence Goodson (c)
LB	17	(Denmark) Jens Stryger Larsen
CM	27	(Denmark) Jan Kristiansen		(substituted off) 56'
CM	26	(Denmark) Mike Jensen	(yellow card) 86'
RM	22	(Denmark) Mathias Gehrt
AM	15	(Denmark) Mikkel Thygesen		(substituted off) 67'
LM	80	(Zimbabwe) Quincy Antipas	(yellow card) 27'
CF	9	(Denmark) Simon Makienok
Substitutions:
MF	23	(Denmark) Franck Semou	(yellow card) 73'	(substituted on) 56'
FW	14	(Nigeria) Oke Akpoveta		(substituted on) 67'
DF	31	(Denmark) Frederik Holst		(substituted on) 76'
Manager:
(Lithuania) Auri Skarbalius

GK	1	(Denmark) Jesper Christiansen
RB	2	(Norway) Espen Ruud	(yellow card) 20'
CB	5	(Denmark) Anders Møller Christensen (c)
CB	26	(Denmark) Daniel Høegh
LB	24	(Denmark) Bashkim Kadrii
CM	8	(Denmark) Michael Silberbauer
CM	21	(Hungary) Krisztián Vadócz
RM	10	(Sweden) Andreas Johansson
AM	9	(Denmark) Rasmus Falk Jensen		(substituted off) 82'
LM	7	(Denmark) Emil Larsen		(substituted off) 69'
CF	19	(Norway) Marcus Pedersen		(substituted off) 82'
Substitutions:
MF	25	(Denmark) Hans Henrik Andreasen		(substituted on) 69'
FW	11	(Denmark) Morten Skoubo		(substituted on) 82'
MF	16	(Denmark) Jacob Schoop		(substituted on) 82'
Manager:
(Denmark) Troels Bech

== Transfers ==
=== In ===
Date	Pos.	Name	From	Fee
1 July 2012	FW	(Estonia) Hannes Anier	(Estonia) Flora Tallinn	Undisclosed
19 June 2012	GK	(Denmark) Nicolai Jørgensen	(Denmark) Brøndby IF	Undisclosed
21 June 2012	MF	(France) Mohammed Diarra	(France) Paris SG	Free transfer
9 July 2012	MF	(Denmark) Emil Larsen	(Denmark) Lyngby BK	540,000 €
27 July 2012	FW	(Cameroon) Cedric N'Koum	(France) USL Dunkerque	Free transfer
6 September 2012	MF	(Hungary) Krisztián Vadócz	(Netherlands) NEC Nijmegen	Undisclosed

=== Loan in ===
Date from	Date to	Pos.	Name	From
31 August 2012	30 June 2013	FW	(Norway) Marcus Pedersen	(Netherlands) Vitesse Arnhem
3 September 2012	30 June 2013	MF	(Denmark) Michael Silberbauer	(Switzerland) Young Boys

=== Out ===
Date	Pos.	Name	To	Fee
30 June 2012	GK	(Germany) Stefan Wessels	End of contract	Undisclosed
30 June 2012	DF	(Denmark) Oliver Larsen	(Denmark) Hobro IK	Undisclosed
30 June 2012	DF	(France) Bernard Mendy	(Cameroon) Brest	Undisclosed
30 June 2012	GK	(Denmark) Daniel Krog	End of contract	Undisclosed
30 June 2012	MF	(Cameroon) Eric Djemba-Djemba	End of contract	Undisclosed
5 August 2012	DF	(Norway) Tore Reginiussen	(Norway) Rosenborg BK	1,100,000 €
1 September 2012	MF	(Mali) Kalilou Traoré	(France) FC Sochaux	1,750,000 €
3 September 2012	MF	(Iceland) Rúrik Gíslason	(Denmark) F.C. Copenhagen	800,000 €

== Matches ==
=== Competitive ===
Game	Date	Tournament	Round	Ground	Opponent	Score^{1}	TV	Report
1	15 July	Danish Superliga	1	A	Brøndby	1–0	Canal 9	Report / Report link; Kick off / 17:00 CEST; Attendance / 9,102; Referee / Lars Christoffersen
2	22 July	Danish Superliga	2	H	Randers FC	0–1	TV2 Sport	Report / Report link; Kick off / 14:00 CEST; Attendance / 7,123; Referee / Mads-Kristoffer Kristoffersen
3	29 July	Danish Superliga	3	A	Nordsjælland	1–1	TV3+	Report / Report link; Kick off / 19:00 CEST; Attendance / 5,736; Referee / Michael Johansen
4	3 August	Danish Superliga	4	A	Silkeborg IF	1–0	TV2 Sport	Report / Report link; Kick off / 18:30 CEST; Attendance / 3,025; Referee / Michael Tykgaard
5	10 August	Danish Superliga	5	H	Midtjylland	2–1	TV2 Sport	Report / Report link; Kick off / 18:30 CEST; Attendance / 8,785; Referee / Lars Christoffersen
6	20 August	Danish Superliga	6	A	SønderjyskE	2–1	TV2 Sport	Report / Report link; Kick off / 19:00 CEST; Attendance / 3,638; Referee / Henning Jensen
7	26 August	Danish Superliga	7	H	AaB	0–4	Canal 8	Report / Report link; Kick off / 17:00 CEST; Attendance / 9,575; Referee / Michael Johansen
8	26 August	Danish Cup	3		NB Bornholm	1–0	-	Report / Report link; Kick off / 17:30 CEST; Attendance / 1,849; Referee / Lars Skibild Jensen
9	2 September	Danish Superliga	8	H	Copenhagen (Denmark)	2–2	TV3+	Report / Report link; Kick off / 19:00 CEST; Attendance / 9,439; Referee / Michael Tykgaard
10	14 September	Danish Superliga	9	A	Esbjerg fB	0–3	TV2 Sport	Report / Report link; Kick off / 18:30 CEST; Attendance / 0; Referee / Jakob Kehlet
11	23 September	Danish Superliga	10	A	Horsens	2–2	TV2 Sport	Report / Report link; Kick off / 15:00 CEST; Attendance / 0; Referee / Lars Christoffersen
12	26 September	Danish Cup	4	H	Hvidovre IF (Denmark)	7–3	-	Report / Report link; Kick off / 19:00 CEST; Attendance / 867; Referee / Michael Johansen
13	2 September	Danish Superliga	11	H	AGF	1–2	Canal 9	Report / Report link; Kick off / 17:00 CEST; Attendance / 9,088; Referee / Kenn Hansen
14	5 October	Danish Superliga	12	H	Nordsjælland	3–0	TV2 Sport	Report / Report link; Kick off / 18:30 CEST; Attendance / 4,116; Referee / Mads-Kristoffer Kristoffersen
15	21 October	Danish Superliga	13	A	Midtjylland	1–1	Canal 9	Report / Report link; Kick off / 17:00 CEST; Attendance / 5,946; Referee / Lars Christoffersen
16	28 October	Danish Superliga	14	H	AGF	2–4	Canal 9	Report / Report link; Kick off / 17:00 CEST; Attendance / 8,764; Referee / Jens Maae
17	31 October	Danish Cup	5	H	Vanløse IF	3–0	-	Report / Report link; Kick off / 19:00 CEST; Attendance / 1,373; Referee / Lars Christoffersen
18	4 November	Danish Superliga	15	A	Brøndby	3–0	Canal 9	Report / Report link; Kick off / 17:00 CEST; Attendance / 10,590; Referee / Henning Jensen
19	11 November	Danish Superliga	16	H	SønderjyskE	5–0	Canal 8	Report / Report link; Kick off / 14:00 CEST; Attendance / 6,029; Referee / Michael Johansen
20	19 November	Danish Superliga	17	A	Randers FC	2–3	TV2 Sport	Report / Report link; Kick off / 19:00 CEST; Referee / Mads-Kristoffer Kristoffersen
21	24 November	Danish Superliga	18	A	Silkeborg IF	2–0	TV2 Sport	Report / Report link; Kick off / 17:00 CEST; Attendance / 3,171; Referee / Anders Poulsen
22	1 December	Danish Superliga	19	H	Esbjerg fB	3–0	TV2 Sport	Report / Report link; Kick off / 17:00 CEST; Attendance / 3,633; Referee / Michael Tykgaard
23	5 December	Danish Cup	Quarterfinal	H	Horsens	2 (2)–2 (4)	TV3+	Report / Report link; Kick off / 17:45 CEST; Attendance / 2,442; Referee / Jakob Kehlet
24	3 March	Danish Superliga	21	H	Copenhagen (Denmark)	2–3	TV3+	Report / Report link; Kick off / 19:00 CEST; Attendance / 10,314; Referee / Jakob Kehlet
25	6 March	Danish Superliga	20	A	AaB	2–2	Canal 9	Report / Report link; Kick off / 18:30 CEST; Attendance / 4,775; Referee / Henning Jensen
26	10 March	Danish Superliga	22	H	Horsens	0–2	TV3+	Report / Report link; Kick off / 14:00 CEST; Attendance / 2,365; Referee / Anders Poulsen

Last updated: 21 May
Source: http://www.ob.dk/kampe/kampkalender.aspx
^{1}Odense Boldklub goals come first.
National flags for Ground and Opponent columns are only shown when different from that of Odense Boldklub.
M = Match; Ground: H = Home, A = Away, N = Neutral, HR = Home replacement, AR = Away replacement.

== Topscorers ==
Pos	Player	League	Cup	Total
1	(Norway) Marcus Pedersen	7	4	11
2	(Hungary) Krisztián Vadócz	7	0	7
2	(Denmark) Emil Larsen	7	0	7
4	(Denmark) Morten Skoubo	5	1	6
5	(Denmark) Bashkim Kadrii	5	0	5
6	(Austria) Darko Bodul	4	0	4
6	(Sweden) Andreas Johansson	2	2	4
8	(Norway) Espen Ruud	3	0	3
9	(Denmark) Rasmus Falk Jensen	2	0	2
9	(Denmark) Jacob Schoop	1	1	2
9	(Denmark) Hans Henrik Andreasen	1	1	2
12	(Mali) Kalilou Traoré	1	0	1
12	(Denmark) Michael Silberbauer	1	0	1
12	(Cameroon) Cedric N'Koum	1	0	1
12	(Denmark) Christian Sørensen	1	0	1
12	(Denmark) Daniel Høegh	0	1	1
