= 2013–14 Odense Boldklub season =

Odense Boldklub
2013–14 season
- Chairman: Niels Thorborg
- Manager: Troels Bech
- Ground: TRE-FOR Park
- Danish Superliga: 8th
- Danish Cup: Second round
- Top goalscorer: League: Mustafa Abdellaoue (9); All: Mustafa Abdellaoue (12)
Home colours	Away colours	Third colours

The 2013–14 season was Odense Boldklub's 126th season in existence. Odense BK has finished as 10th (lowest before relegation) the last two seasons.

== Pre-season and friendlies ==
OB will precede their 2013–14 campaign with a local tour of 4 exhibition matches on Funen, including a training camp in Germany, with friendlies against VfL Bochum and Goslarer SC 08.

18 June 2013	Humble BK	0 – 8	Odense BK	Humble
18:30 CEST		Report		Stadium: Humble Stadion

20 June 2013	Tårup IF	1 – 13	Odense BK	Tårup
18:00 CEST		Report		Stadium: Tårup Stadion

22 June 2013	Båring GF	0 – 30	Odense BK	Båring
13:00 CEST		Report		Stadium: Båring Stadion

25 June 2013	Næsby BK	0 – 4	Odense BK	Næsby
18:45 CEST		Report		Stadium: Næsby Stadion

3 July 2013	VfL Bochum	2 – 1	Odense BK	Herne, Germany
18:30 CEST		Report		Stadium: ABISOL-ARENA

5 July 2013	Goslarer SC 08	1 – 5	Odense BK	Goslar, Germany
18:30 CEST		Report		Stadium: Schulzentrum Goldene Aue

12 July 2013	Odense BK	1 – 2	FC Fredericia	Odense
17:00 CEST	Spelmann 16'	Report	Moos 26'; Mikkelsen 86'	Stadium: TRE-FOR Park

== Squad ==
=== First team ===
Last updated on 31 August 2013

Squad No.	Name	Nationality	Position	Date of birth (age)	Signed from	Signed in	Contract ends	Apps.	Goals
Goalkeepers
1	Jesper Christiansen	(Denmark)	GK	April 24, 1978 (age 48)	Elfsborg	2012	2015	44	0
17	Mads Toppel	(Denmark)	GK	January 30, 1982 (age 44)	Tromsø	2011	2015	34	0
27	Casper Radza	(Denmark)	GK	February 26, 1994 (age 32)	Youth team	2013	?	0	0
Defenders
2	Espen Ruud	(Norway)	RB	February 26, 1984 (age 42)	Odd Grenland	2008	2014	202	19
4	Niclas Vemmelund	(Denmark)	CB	October 2, 1992 (age 34)	FC Fyn	2013	2014	0	0
5	Anders Møller Christensen (c)	(Denmark)	CB	March 19, 1981 (age 45)	Esbjerg	2006	2014	265	3
15	Kasper Larsen	(Denmark)	CB	January 25, 1993 (age 33)	Youth team	2012	2016	41	0
22	Ari Skúlason	(Iceland)	LB	May 14, 1987 (age 39)	GIF Sundsvall	2013	2016	5	0
24	Bashkim Kadrii	(Denmark)	LB	July 9, 1991 (age 35)	B.93	2010	2015	107	17
26	Daniel Høegh	(Denmark)	CB	January 6, 1991 (age 35)	Youth team	2010	2016	74	2
Midfielders
6	Mohammed Diarra	(France)	CDM	June 20, 1992 (age 34)	Paris SG	2012	2016	17	0
7	Emil Larsen	(Denmark)	LM	June 22, 1991 (age 35)	Lyngby	2012	2016	37	8
8	Martin Spelmann	(Denmark)	CM	March 21, 1987 (age 39)	Horsens	2013	2016	7	0
14	Conor O'Brien	(United States)	CM	October 20, 1988 (age 38)	Nordsjælland	2013	2015	0	0
16	Jacob Schoop	(Denmark)	CM	December 23, 1988 (age 37)	FC Fyn	2011	2015	39	2
21	Krisztián Vadócz	(Hungary)	CM	May 30, 1985 (age 41)	Nijmegen	2012	2014	31	8
23	Cédric N'Koum	(Cameroon)	LW/RW	July 22, 1984 (age 42)	Dunkerque	2012	2016	25	2
Forwards
9	Rasmus Falk Jensen	(Denmark)	FW	January 15, 1992 (age 34)	Youth team	2010	2016	77	12
10	Darko Bodul	(Croatia)	FW	January 11, 1989 (age 37)	Strum Graz	2013	2015	21	4
11	Morten Skoubo	(Denmark)	FW	June 30, 1980 (age 46)	Roda	2011	2014	58	10
18	David Löfquist	(Sweden)	FW	August 6, 1986 (age 40)	Malmö (loan)	2013	2013	12	0
19	Jeppe Hansen	(Denmark)	FW	February 10, 1989 (age 37)	Næsby	2013	2014	5	1
30	Mustafa Abdellaoue	(Norway)	FW	August 1, 1988 (age 38)	Copenhagen	2013	2014	0	0

== Transfers and loans ==
=== Transfers in ===
First team

No.	Pos.	Nat.	Name	Age	EU	Moving from	Type	Transfer window	Ends	Transfer fee	Source
22	LB	(Iceland)	Ari Skúlason	39	EU	GIF Sundsvall	Transfer	Summer	2016	free transfer	ob.dk
8	CM	(Denmark)	Martin Spelmann	39	EU	Horsens	Transfer	Summer	2017	?	ob.dk
19	FW	(Denmark)	Jeppe Hansen	37	EU	Næsby BK	Transfer	Summer	2014	?	ob.dk

Last updated: 18 July 2013

Reserves and youth team

No.	Pos.	Nat.	Name	Age	EU	Moving from	Type	Transfer window	Ends	Transfer fee	Source
27	GK	(Denmark)	Casper Radza	32	EU		Transfer	Summer	=	?	

Last updated: 18 July 2013

=== Transfers out ===
First team

No.	Pos.	Nat.	Name	Age	EU	Moving to	Type	Transfer window	Transfer fee	Source

Last updated: 3 July 2013

Reserves and youth team

No.	Pos.	Nat.	Name	Age	EU	Moving to	Type	Transfer window	Transfer fee	Source

Last updated: 7 June 2013

== Competitions ==
=== Danish Superliga ===
==== League table ====
Pos	Team	Pld	W	D	L	GF	GA	GD	Pts
6	Nordsjælland	33	13	7	13	38	44	−6	46
7	Randers FC	33	9	14	10	41	45	−4	41
8	OB	33	10	10	13	47	46	+1	40
9	Vestsjælland	33	8	14	11	31	42	−11	38
10	SønderjyskE	33	10	8	15	41	53	−12	38

Source: Danish Football Association (in Danish)
Rules for classification: 1) points; 2) goal difference; 3) number of goals scored.

==== Matches ====
21 July 2013 1	OB	1 – 1	SønderjyskE	Odense
14:00 CEST	Vadócz 9'	Report	Madsen 61'	Stadium: TRE-FOR Park; Attendance: 7,114; Referee: Jakob Kehlet

28 July 2013 2	Randers	1 – 1	OB	Randers
14:00 CEST	Schwartz 42'	Report	Kadrii 78'	Stadium: AutoC Park Randers; Attendance: 4,852; Referee: Lars Christoffersen

4 August 2013 3	OB	4 – 2	Viborg	Odense
14:00 CEST	Kadrii 29', 30'; E. Larsen 58'; Falk 71'	Report	Rask 43'; Dalgaard 88'	Stadium: TRE-FOR Park; Attendance: 7,889; Referee: Peter Kjærsgaard-Andersen

11 August 2013 4	AaB	0 – 0	OB	Aalborg
17:00 CEST		Report		Stadium: Energi Nord Arena; Attendance: 6,369; Referee: Mads-Kristoffer Kristoffersen

18 August 2013 5	Vestsjælland	1 – 1	OB	Slagelse
14:00 CEST	Skoubo 20'	Report	Festersen 90+3'	Stadium: Slagelse Stadion; Attendance: 4,434; Referee: Michael Johansen

26 August 2013 6	OB	1 – 0	Nordsjælland	Odense
13:00 CEST	Hansen 82'	Report		Stadium: TRE-FOR Park; Attendance: 7,716; Referee: Kenn Hansen

30 August 2013 7	OB	3 – 6	AGF	Odense
18:30 CEST	Falk 27'; E. Larsen 35'; Skoubo 57'	Report	Akharraz 44'; Sorin 46'; Juel Andersen 49'; Larsen 75'; Lange 81'; Devdariani 90+1'	Stadium: TRE-FOR Park; Attendance: 8,069; Referee: Anders Poulsen

15 September 2013 8	Brøndby	2 – 1	OB	Brøndby
19:00 CEST	Ørnskov 36'; Hasani 66'	Report	E. Larsen 61'	Stadium: Brøndby Stadion; Attendance: 12,487; Referee: Michael Johansen

22 September 2013 9	Copenhagen	2 – 1	OB	Copenhagen
19:00 CEST	Delaney 74'; Vetokele 83'	Report	E. Larsen 23'	Stadium: Parken Stadium; Attendance: 11,008; Referee: Mads-Kristoffer Kristoffersen

29 September 2013 10	OB	1 – 1	Midtjylland	Odense
19:00 CEST	Vadócz 52'	Report	Uzochukwu 45'	Stadium: TRE-FOR Park; Attendance: 8,633; Referee: Michael Tykgaard

6 October 2013 11	Esbjerg	1 - 3	OB	Esbjerg
13:00 CEST	Bakenga 13'; Rasmussen (yellow card) 37'	Summary	Larsen 3'; Ruud (yellow card) 71'; Vadócz (yellow card) 79'; Høegh 83'; Spelmann 87'	Stadium: Blue Water Arena; Attendance: 6,967; Referee: Anders Poulsen

21 October 2013 12	SønderjyskE	1 - 5	OB	Haderslev
19:00 CEST	Hansen 63' (pen.); Lodberg (yellow card) 86'	Summary	Abdellaoue 42', 58', 65'; Larsen 53'; Bodul 61'	Stadium: Haderslev Fodboldstadion; Attendance: 3,169; Referee: Jakob Kehlet

27 October 2013 13	OB	0 - 0	Brøndby	Odense
15:00 CEST	Ruud (yellow card) 33'; Larsen (yellow card) 62'	Summary	Almebäck (yellow card) 55'	Stadium: TRE-FOR Park; Attendance: 11,524; Referee: Lars Christoffersen

2 November 2013 14	AaB	1 - 0	OB	Aalborg
17:00 CEST	Dalsgaard (yellow card) 27'; Høegh 49' (o.g.)	Summary	Spelmann (yellow card) 72'	Stadium: Energi Nord Arena; Attendance: 5,289; Referee: (Denmark) Anders Poulsen

10 November 2013 15	OB	1 - 3	Vestsjælland	Odense
14:00 CEST	Abdellaoue 68'	Summary	Nielsen 14'; Jonas Thomsen (yellow card) 18'; Tshibamba 30'; Bozga 47' (yellow card) 49'	Stadium: TRE-FOR Park; Attendance: 7,813; Referee: (Denmark) Jens Maae

23 November 2013 16	Randers FC	1 - 1	OB	Randers
17:00 CEST	Nicolai Poulsen (yellow card) 21'; Schwartz 43'	Summary	Larsen (yellow card) 79'; O'Brien (yellow card) 86'; Ruud 90+3'	Stadium: AutoC Park Randers; Attendance: 3,824; Referee: (Denmark) Kenn Hansen

1 December 2013 17	OB	4 - 1	AGF	Odense
17:00 CEST	Abdellaoue 5', 66'; Skoubo 10'; Falk 51' spelmann (yellow card) 55'; Ruud (yellow card) 90+1'	Summary	Jønsson (yellow card) 44'; Devdariani 53'	Stadium: TRE-FOR Park; Attendance: 5,728; Referee: (Denmark) Dennis Mogensen

6 December 2013 18	FC Nordsjælland	2 - 0	OB	Farum
18:30 CEST	Stokholm 13'; John 70'	Summary		Stadium: Farum Park; Attendance: 3,413; Referee: (Denmark) Michael Johansen

22 February 2014 19	OB	2 - 1	FC Midtjylland	Odense
17:00 CEST	Ruud 21'; Christensen (yellow card) 52'; Skúlason (yellow card) 52'	Summary	Rasmussen 38'; Poulsen (yellow card) 45+2'	Stadium: TRE-FOR Park; Attendance: 7,783; Referee: (Denmark) Michael Tykgaard

Last updated: 1 October 2013.
Source: Odense Boldklub

==== Results summary ====
Overall								Home						Away					
Pld	W	D	L	GF	GA	GD	Pts	W	D	L	GF	GA	GD	W	D	L	GF	GA	GD
29	8	10	11	41	40	+1	34	4	5	5	22	23	−1	4	5	6	19	17	+2

Last updated: 28 April 2014.
Source: Statto.com

==== Result by match day ====
Matchday	1	2	3	4	5	6	7	8	9	10	11	12	13	14	15	16	17	18	19	20	21	22	23	24	25	26	27	28	29	30	31	32	33
Ground	H	A	H	A	A	H	H	A	A	H	A	A	H	A	H	A	H	A	H	A	H	H	A	H	A	A	H	A	H	A	H	H	A
Result	D	D	W	D	D	W	L	L	L	D	W	W	D	L	L	D	W	L	W	L	L	D	W	D	D	W	L	L	L				
Position (Note: Odense's position at the end of the day in which their match was played)	8	8	5	4	4	2	5	7	10	9	6	4	4	6	9	8	5	7	5	8	8	7	6	7	7	6	7	8	8				

Updated to match(es) played on 28 April 2014. Source: Statto.com
A = Away; H = Home; W = Win; D = Draw; L = Loss

== Squad statistics ==
=== Appearances and goals ===
Appearances and goals will appear once the season commences.

Last updated on 27 August 2013

No.	Pos.	Player	Superliga				DBU Pokalen				Total			
No.	Pos.	Player	Apps	Starts	Goals	Assists	Apps	Starts	Goals	Assists	Apps	Starts	Goals	Assists
1	GK	(Denmark) Jesper Christiansen	6	6	0	0	0	0	0	0	6	6	0	0
2	DF	(Norway) Espen Ruud	5	5	0	1	0	0	0	0	5	5	0	1
4	DF	(Denmark) Niclas Vemmelund	3	0	0	0	0	0	0	0	3	0	0	0
5	DF	(Denmark) Anders Møller Christensen	6	6	0	0	0	0	0	0	6	6	0	0
6	MF	(France) Mohammed Diarra	6	4	0	0	0	0	0	0	6	4	0	0
7	MF	(Denmark) Emil Larsen	6	6	1	1	0	0	0	0	6	6	1	1
8	MF	(Denmark) Martin Spelmann	6	6	0	1	0	0	0	0	6	6	0	1
9	MF	(Denmark) Rasmus Falk Jensen	5	4	1	1	0	0	0	0	5	4	1	1
10	FW	(Croatia) Darko Bodul	6	4	0	2	0	0	0	0	6	4	0	2
11	FW	(Denmark) Morten Skoubo	5	3	1	1	0	0	0	0	5	3	1	1
14	FW	(Estonia) Hannes Anier	5	1	0	0	0	0	0	0	5	1	0	0
15	DF	(Denmark) Kasper Larsen	6	6	0	1	0	0	0	0	6	6	0	1
16	MF	(Denmark) Jacob Schoop	3	3	0	0	0	0	0	0	3	3	0	0
17	GK	(Denmark) Mads Toppel	5	0	0	0	0	0	0	0	5	0	0	0
18	FW	(Sweden) David Löfquist	3	0	0	0	0	0	0	0	3	0	0	0
19	FW	(Denmark) Jeppe Hansen	6	1	1	0	0	0	0	0	6	1	1	0
21	MF	(Hungary) Krisztián Vadócz	6	3	1	0	0	0	0	0	6	3	1	0
22	DF	(Iceland) Ari Skúlason	3	3	0	0	0	0	0	0	3	3	0	0
23	FW	(Cameroon) Cedric N'Koum	5	0	0	0	0	0	0	0	5	0	0	0
24	DF	(Denmark) Bashkim Kadrii	2	2	3	0	0	0	0	0	2	2	3	0
26	DF	(Denmark) Daniel Høegh	6	1	0	0	0	0	0	0	6	1	0	0
27	GK	(Denmark) Casper Radza	1	0	0	0	0	0	0	0	1	0	0	0
–	DF	(Denmark) Emil Peter Jørgensen	1	1	0	0	0	0	0	0	1	1	0	0
–	MF	(Denmark) Mark Kongstedt	1	0	0	0	0	0	0	0	1	0	0	0

=== Goalscorers ===
Includes all competitive matches. The list is sorted by shirt number when total goals are equal.

Last updated on 1 October 2013

Rank	Pos.	No.	Player	Superliga	DBU Pokalen	Total
1	MF	7	Emil Larsen	4	0	4
2	MF	21	Krisztián Vadócz	2	0	2
2	DF	24	Bashkim Kadrii	3	0	3
4	FW	30	Mustafa Abdellaoue	0	3	0
5	FW	9	Rasmus Falk Jensen	2	0	2
5	FW	11	Morten Skoubo	2	0	2
7	FW	19	Jeppe Hansen	1	2	3
8	FW	10	Darko Bodul	0	1	1
8	MF	14	Conor O'Brien	0	1	1
8	FW	18	David Löfquist	0	1	1
8	FW	29	Dusan Djurić	0	1	1
TOTALS				14	11	25

=== Disciplinary record ===
Includes all competitive matches. The list is sorted by shirt number when total cards are equal.

Last updated on 1 October 2013

Rank	Pos.	No.	Player	Superliga		DBU Pokalen		Total	
Rank	Pos.	No.	Player	Yellow card	Red card	Yellow card	Red card	Yellow card	Red card
1	DF	5	Anders Møller Christensen	3	0	0	0	3	0
2	DF	2	Espen Ruud	2	0	0	0	2	0
2	MF	8	Martin Spelmann	2	0	0	0	2	0
2	DF	22	Ari Skúlason	2	0	0	0	2	0
5	FW	10	Darko Bodul	1	0	1	0	2	0
6	MF	6	Mohammed Diarra	1	0	0	0	1	0
6	FW	9	Rasmus Falk Jensen	2	0	0	0	2	0
6	MF	14	Conor O'Brien	1	0	0	0	1	0
6	DF	15	Kasper Larsen	1	0	0	0	1	0
6	FW	23	Cedric N'Koum	1	0	0	0	1	0
6	DF	26	Daniel Høegh	1	0	0	0	1	0
TOTALS				17	0	1	0	18	0
