= 2010–11 Odense Boldklub season =

Odense BK
2010–11 season
- Chairman: Niels Thorborg
- Manager: Lars Olsen
- Stadium: Fionia Park
- Danish Superliga: 2nd
- Danish Cup: Fourth round
- UEFA Europa League: Group stage
- Top goalscorer: League: Peter Utaka (14 goals); All: Peter Utaka (20 goals)
Home colours	Away colours

The 2010–11 Odense Boldklub season was the club's 123rd season, and their 50th appearance in the Danish Superliga. As well as the Superliga, they competed in the Ekstra Bladet Cup.

== First team ==
Last updated on 31 May 2011

Squad no.	Name	Nationality	Position	Date of birth (age)
Goalkeepers
17	Mads Toppel	(Denmark)	GK	30 January 1982 (aged 29)
30	Alexander Lund Hansen	(Norway)	GK	6 October 1982 (aged 28)
33	Stefan Wessels	(Germany)	GK	28 February 1979 (aged 32)
Defenders
2	Espen Ruud	(Norway)	RB	26 February 1984 (aged 27)
3	Atle Roar Håland	(Norway)	CB	26 July 1977 (aged 33)
5	Anders Møller Christensen	(Denmark)	CB	26 July 1977 (aged 33)
6	Thomas Helveg	(Denmark)	RB/CB	24 January 1971 (aged 40)
14	Jonas Troest	(Denmark)	CB	4 March 1985 (aged 26)
15	Chris Sørensen (captain)	(Denmark)	LB/CB	27 July 1977 (aged 33)
22	Bernard Mendy	(France)	LB/RB	20 August 1981 (aged 29)
23	Oliver Larsen	(Denmark)	CB	12 November 1991 (aged 19)
26	Daniel Høegh	(Denmark)	CB	6 January 1991 (aged 20)
Midfielders
4	Hans Henrik Andreasen	(Denmark)	CM/RM	10 January 1979 (aged 32)
10	Andreas Johansson	(Sweden)	AM	5 July 1978 (aged 32)
17	Cacá	(Brazil)	AM	9 October 1982 (aged 28)
18	Kalilou Traoré	(Mali)	CM/DM	9 September 1987 (aged 23)
19	Eric Djemba-Djemba	(Cameroon)	DM	4 May 1981 (aged 30)
21	Rúrik Gíslason	(Iceland)	RM/RW	25 February 1988 (aged 23)
24	Bashkim Kadrii	(Denmark)	LM	9 July 1991 (aged 19)
25	Oliver Feldballe	(Denmark)	LM/AM	3 April 1990 (aged 21)
Forwards
7	Peter Utaka	(Nigeria)	ST	12 February 1984 (aged 27)
9	Rasmus Falk	(Denmark)	ST/AM	15 January 1992 (aged 19)
13	Henrik Toft	(Denmark)	ST	15 April 1981 (aged 30)

== Transfers and loans ==
=== Transfers in ===
Entry date	Position	No.	Player	From club	Fee	Ref.
1 July 2010	MF	10	(Sweden) Andreas Johansson	(Denmark) Aalborg BK	Free transfer	
1 July 2010	FW	13	(Denmark) Henrik Toft	(Denmark) HB Køge		
1 July 2010	MF	18	(Mali) Kalilou Traoré	(Croatia) NK Istra	Free transfer	
2 July 2010	DF	26	(Denmark) Daniel Høegh	Youth academy		
12 July 2010	MF	24	(Denmark) Bashkim Kadrii	(Denmark) B93	1,500,000 DKK	
20 January 2011	GK	17	(Denmark) Mads Toppel	(Norway) Tromsø	Free transfer	
9 February 2011	DF	22	(France) Bernard Mendy	Without club	Free transfer	
Total						

== Competitions ==
=== Superliga ===
==== Results summary ====
Overall								Home						Away					
Pld	W	D	L	GF	GA	GD	Pts	W	D	L	GF	GA	GD	W	D	L	GF	GA	GD
33	16	7	10	55	41	+14	55	9	4	4	33	17	+16	7	3	6	22	24	−2

Last updated: 29 May 2011.
Source: Worldfootball.net

==== Result by round ====
Matchday	1	2	3	4	5	6	7	8	9	10	11	12	13	14	15	16	17	18	19	20	21	22	23	24	25	26	27	28	29	30	31	32	33
Ground	H	H	A	H	A	A	H	H	A	H	A	A	H	A	H	A	H	A	H	A	H	A	A	H	A	H	A	H	H	A	H	H	A
Result	W	D	L	L	W	D	W	L	L	W	W	L	L	W	W	W	W	L	W	L	W	D	W	D	D	L	W	W	D	W	D	W	L
Position	2	3	6	9	5	6	4	4	5	4	3	4	6	4	4	3	2	4	2	3	2	2	2	2	2	2	2	2	2	2	2	2	2

Updated to match(es) played on 29 May 2011. Source: Worldfootball.net
A = Away; H = Home; W = Win; D = Draw; L = Loss

==== League table ====
Pos	Team	Pld	W	D	L	GF	GA	GD	Pts	Qualification or relegation
1	Copenhagen (C)	33	25	6	2	77	29	+48	81	Qualification to Champions League third qualifying round
2	OB	33	16	7	10	55	41	+14	55	Qualification to Champions League third qualifying round
3	Brøndby	33	13	12	8	52	39	+13	51	Qualification to Europa League third qualifying round
4	Midtjylland	33	13	10	10	50	42	+8	49	Qualification to Europa League second qualifying round
5	Silkeborg	33	10	13	10	43	49	−6	43	

Source: Danish Football Association
Rules for classification: 1) points; 2) goal difference; 3) number of goals scored.
(C) Champions

==== Matches ====
17 July 2010 1	Odense	3–0	Esbjerg	Odense
17:00 CEST	Johansson 22'; Andreasen 76'; Gíslason 89'	Report	Rieks (yellow card) 90'	Stadium: TRE-FOR Park; Attendance: 8,522; Referee: Anders Hermansen

26 July 2010 2	Odense	1–1	Randers	Odense
19:00 CEST	Andreasen (yellow card) 51', (goal) 77'; Carroll (yellow card) 90'	Report	Cramer 89'	Stadium: TRE-FOR Park; Attendance: 10,617; Referee: Lars Christoffersen

2 August 2010 3	Horsens	1–0	Odense	Horsens
19:00 CEST	Rasmussen 40'	Report	Absalonsen (yellow card) 90'	Stadium: CASA Arena Horsens; Attendance: 4,271; Referee: Henrik Nystrup Kragh

8 August 2010 4	Odense	2–3	Copenhagen	Odense
18:00 CEST	Gíslason 30'; Ruud (yellow card) 45'; Traoré (yellow card) 52'; Andreasen 59'	Report	N'Doye 9', 88'; Grønkjær 22'; Kvist (yellow card) 62'	Stadium: TRE-FOR Park; Attendance: 11,187; Referee: Nicolai Vollquartz

=== UEFA Europa League ===
Win Draw Loss

==== Third qualifying round ====
29 July 2010 First leg	Odense (Denmark)	5–3	(Bosnia and Herzegovina) Zrinjski	Odense, Denmark
19:10 CEST	Gíslason 16'; Absalonsen 23'; Utaka 31', 60'; Andreasen 37'; Ruud (yellow card) 56'; Traoré (yellow card) 65'	Report	Rizvanović (yellow card) 14'; Zadro 15', 71', (yellow card) 78'; Žižović 65' (pen.); Stjepanović (yellow card) 70'	Stadium: TRE-FOR Park; Attendance: 4,302; Referee: Euan Norris, (Scotland)

5 August 2010 Second leg	Zrinjski (Bosnia and Herzegovina)	0–0	(Denmark) Odense	Mostar, Bosnia and Herzegovina
21:00 CEST	Stjepanović (yellow card) 87'; Aničić (yellow card) 90'	Report	Gíslason (yellow card) 18'; Traoré (yellow card) 50'	Stadium: Bijeli Brijeg Stadium; Attendance: 10,250; Referee: Jan Jech, (Czech Republic)

Odense won 5–3 on aggregate

==== Play-off round ====
19 August 2010 First leg	Odense (Denmark)	2–1	(Scotland) Motherwell	Odense, Denmark
19:05 CEST	Sørensen 31'; Utaka 78'; Andreasen (yellow card) 90+3'	Report	Reynolds (yellow card) 6'; Jennings (yellow card) 50' (yellow-red card) 88'; Saunders (yellow card) 80'; Hateley 90+4'	Stadium: TRE-FOR Park; Attendance: 5,127; Referee: Zsolt Szabó, (Hungary)

26 August 2010 Second leg	Motherwell (Scotland)	0–1	(Denmark) Odense	Motherwell, Scotland
20:45 CEST	Hateley (yellow card) 43'; Saunders (yellow card) 51'; Lasley (yellow card) 59'	Report	Ruud (yellow card) 21' (yellow-red card) 75'; Christensen (yellow card) 22' (yellow-red card) 85'; Utaka 28'; Djemba-Djemba (yellow card) 75'	Stadium: Fir Park; Attendance: 9,105; Referee: Michael Koukoulakis, (Greece)

Odense won 3–1 on aggregate

==== Group stage ====
Team	Pld	W	D	L	GF	GA	GD	Pts
(Germany) Stuttgart	6	5	0	1	16	6	+10	15
(Switzerland) Young Boys	6	3	0	3	10	10	0	9
(Spain) Getafe	6	2	1	3	4	8	−4	7
(Denmark) Odense	6	1	1	4	8	14	−6	4

16 September 2010 1	Getafe (Spain)	2–1	(Denmark) Odense	Getafe, Spain
21:05 CEST	Boateng (yellow card) 8'; Arizmendi 51'; Casquero (yellow card) 51'; Mané (yellow card) 60'; Pedro Ríos 81', (yellow card) 85'	Report	Andreasen 44', (yellow card) 87'; Gíslason (yellow card) 67'; Troest (yellow card) 80'	Stadium: Coliseum Alfonso Pérez; Attendance: 2,420; Referee: Mark Courtney, (Northern Ireland)

30 September 2010 2	Odense (Denmark)	1–2	(Germany) Stuttgart	Odense, Denmark
19:00 CEST	Traoré (yellow card) 15'; Johansson 78'	Report	Cacau (yellow card) 35'; Boka (yellow card) 68'; Kuzmanović 72'; Gentner (yellow card) 74'; Harnik 86'	Stadium: TRE-FOR Park; Attendance: 8,854; Referee: Alexandru Deaconu, (Romania)

21 October 2010 3	Young Boys (Switzerland)	4–2	(Denmark) Odense	Bern, Switzerland
19:00 CEST				Stadium: Stade de Suisse

4 November 2010 4	Odense (Denmark)	2–0	(Switzerland) Young Boys	Odense, Denmark
21:05 CEST				Stadium: TRE-FOR Park

1 December 2010 5	Odense (Denmark)	1–1	(Spain) Getafe	Odense, Denmark
19:00 CEST				Stadium: TRE-FOR Park

16 December 2010 6	Stuttgart (Germany)	5–1	(Denmark) Odense	Stuttgart, Germany
21:05 CEST				Stadium: Mercedes-Benz Arena
