= Rasmus Falk =

Danish footballer (born 1992)

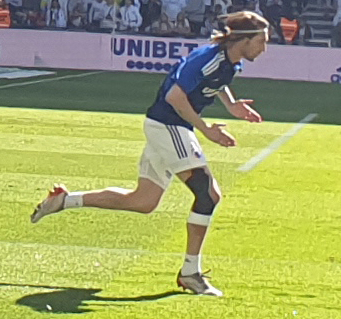
- Falk in 2022 during training with Copenhagen

Personal information
- Full name: Rasmus Falk Østergaard
- Date of birth: 15 January 1992 (age 34)
- Place of birth: Middelfart, Denmark
- Height: 1.77 m (5 ft 10 in)
- Position: Midfielder

Team information
- Current team: OB
- Number: 8

Youth career
- Middelfart G&BK
- 2005–2010: OB

Senior career*
Years	Team	Apps	(Gls)
2010–2016	OB	146	(24)
2016–2025	Copenhagen	221	(21)
2025–	OB	29	(1)

International career^{‡}
2007–2008	Denmark U16	4	(1)
2008–2009	Denmark U17	11	(4)
2009–2010	Denmark U18	11	(3)
2010–2011	Denmark U19	6	(0)
2011–2015	Denmark U21	12	(2)
2013–2020	Denmark	2	(0)
- * Club domestic league appearances and goals as of 19 May 2026 ‡ National team caps and goals as of 8 September 2020

Rasmus Falk Østergaard (born 15 January 1992) is a Danish professional footballer who plays as a midfielder for and captains Danish Superliga club OB.

== Club career ==
=== OB ===
Falk joined Odense Boldklub's (OB) youth academy from hometown club Middelfart G&BK in 2005, aged 13, alongside future Denmark international Christian Eriksen. After progressing through OB's youth ranks, he advanced to the club's under-19 side in 2009 before signing a professional contract the following year. He made his senior debut on 16 May 2010, coming on as a substitute in a 3–0 Danish Superliga victory over AGF.

Falk established himself in the first team over the following seasons, contributing to OB's UEFA Europa League campaign in which the club reached the group stage, finishing bottom of their group alongside Fulham, FC Twente and Wisła Kraków. In December 2012, with interest from other clubs growing, OB secured his services by extending his contract until June 2016. He went on to become one of the club's most consistent performers, with his final season at OB in 2015–16 proving his most productive in terms of goal contributions. He departed OB as a free agent at the end of the season after 145 Superliga appearances.

=== Copenhagen ===
On 20 January 2016, Falk signed a pre-contract with Copenhagen, as he turned down a contract extension for OB, meaning that he could move as a free agent in the summer. On 1 July 2016, he officially moved to Copenhagen on a four-year contract.

Falk made his Copenhagen debut on 13 July 2016 and scored the final goal in the 3–0 Champions League qualification away win over Crusaders. In his first season at the club, he won the double; the Danish Superliga and Danish Cup.

On 5 August 2020, Falk scored the third goal in a 3–0 win over Turkish champions İstanbul Başakşehir to secure a spot in the quarter-finals of the Europa League.

=== Return to OB ===
On 2 July 2025, Copenhagen announced that Falk would be returning to OB, signing a contract until the summer of 2028.

== International career ==
On 29 August 2013, Falk was called up to play for the Denmark national team. He played the first half of a 2–1 FIFA World Cup qualification win over Malta on 6 September 2013.

== Personal life ==
Born Rasmus Falk Jensen, he adopted the surname Østergaard in 2022 after marrying Jacqueline Østergaard. The couple had a son in 2024.

== Career statistics ==
=== Club ===
As of match played 12 April 2026

Appearances and goals by club, season and competition
Club	Season	League			Danish Cup		Europe		Other		Total	
Club	Season	Division	Apps	Goals	Apps	Goals	Apps	Goals	Apps	Goals	Apps	Goals
OB	2009–10	Danish Superliga	1	0	—		—		—		1	0
OB	2010–11	Danish Superliga	12	1	0	0	1 (Note: Appearances in UEFA Europa League)	0	—		13	1
OB	2011–12	Danish Superliga	27	4	1	0	7 (Note: 3 appearances in UEFA Champions League, 4 appearances and 2 goals in UEFA Europa League)	2	—		17	2
OB	2012–13	Danish Superliga	19	2	3	2	—		—		22	4
OB	2013–14	Danish Superliga	29	6	2	1	—		—		31	7
OB	2014–15	Danish Superliga	27	5	0	0	—		—		27	5
OB	2015–16	Danish Superliga	31	6	2	0	—		—		33	6
OB	Total		146	24	8	3	8	2	—		162	29
Copenhagen	2016–17	Danish Superliga	22	5	1	1	19 (Note: 16 appearances in UEFA Champions League, 3 appearances and 1 goal in UEFA Europa League)	3	—		42	9
Copenhagen	2017–18	Danish Superliga	31	3	1	0	7	0	—		39	3
Copenhagen	2018–19	Danish Superliga	33	4	2	0	12	0	—		47	4
Copenhagen	2019–20	Danish Superliga	31	1	2	0	15 (Note: 2 appearances in UEFA Champions League, 13 appearances and 1 goal in UEFA Europa League)	1	—		48	2
Copenhagen	2020–21	Danish Superliga	28	4	2	0	2	0	—		32	4
Copenhagen	2021–22	Danish Superliga	22	0	0	0	7 (Note: Appearances in UEFA Conference League)	1	—		29	1
Copenhagen	2022–23	Danish Superliga	27	2	6	0	5 (Note: Appearances in UEFA Champions League)	0	—		38	2
Copenhagen	2023–24	Danish Superliga	29	3	4	0	13	1	1 (Note: Appearance in Danish Superliga European play-off match)	0	47	3
Copenhagen	2024–25	Danish Superliga	12	0	2	0	7	1	—		21	1
Copenhagen	Total		221	21	15	1	87	7	1	0	324	28
OB	2025–26	Danish Superliga	23	1	4	0	—		—		27	1
Career total			390	46	27	4	95	9	1	0	513	58

== Honours ==
Copenhagen

- Danish Superliga: 2016–17, 2018–19, 2021–22, 2022–23, 2024–25
- Danish Cup: 2016–17, 2022–23, 2024–25
