= Rúrik Gíslason =

Icelandic footballer (born 1988)

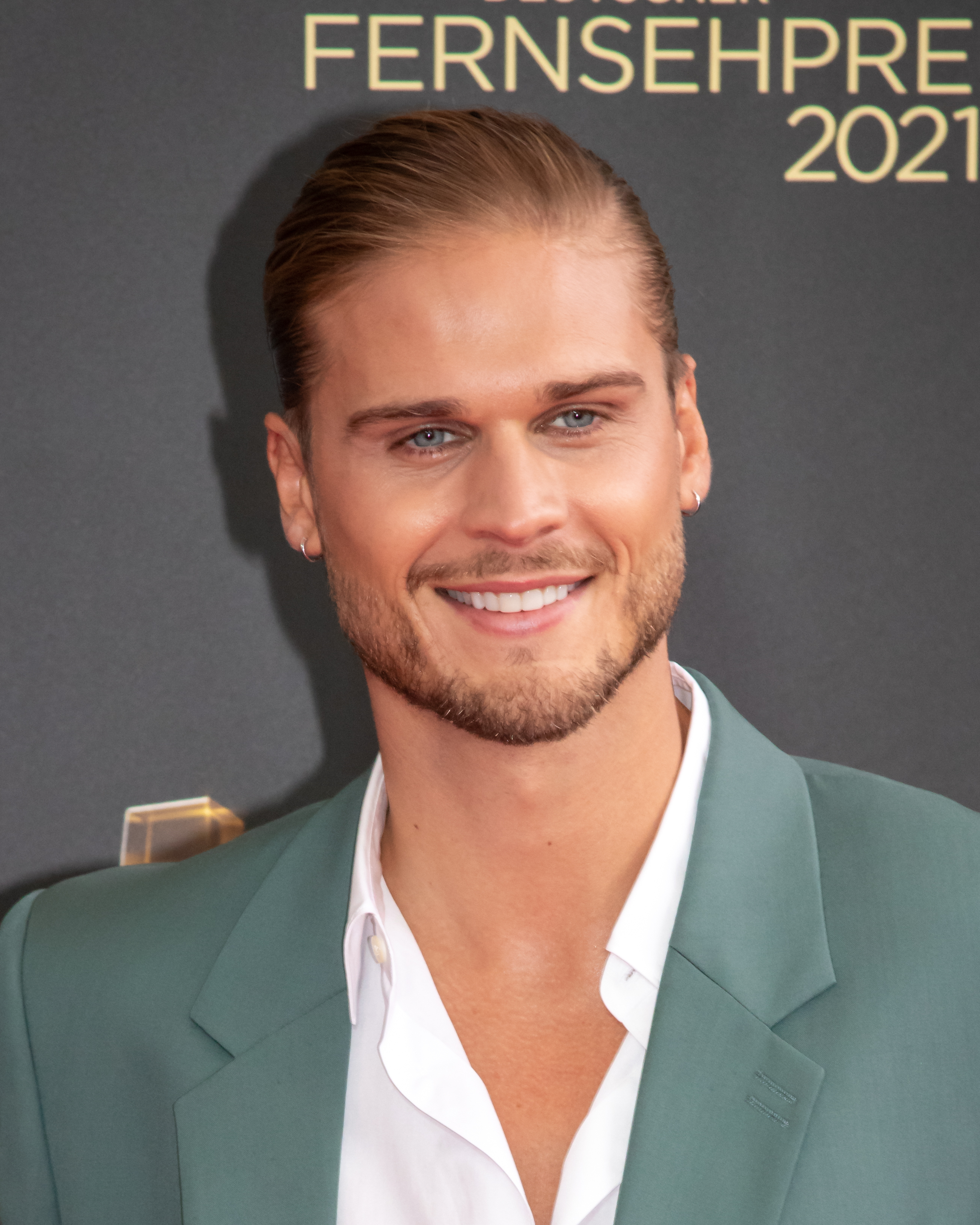
- Gíslason in 2021

Personal information
- Full name: Rúrik Gíslason
- Date of birth: 25 February 1988 (age 38)
- Place of birth: Reykjavík, Iceland
- Height: 1.84 m (6 ft 0 in)
- Positions: Midfielder; forward

Youth career
- HK
- Anderlecht

Senior career*
Years	Team	Apps	(Gls)
2005	HK	12	(1)
2005–2007	Charlton Athletic	0	(0)
2007–2009	Viborg	46	(16)
2009–2012	OB	87	(10)
2012–2015	Copenhagen	68	(5)
2015–2018	1. FC Nürnberg	30	(0)
2016–2017	1. FC Nürnberg II	6	(1)
2018–2020	SV Sandhausen	55	(3)
Total		304	(36)

International career
2003–2004	Iceland U17	14	(5)
2005–2007	Iceland U19	15	(5)
2005–2011	Iceland U21	19	(6)
2009–2018	Iceland	53	(3)
- * Club domestic league appearances and goals

Rúrik Gíslason (born 25 February 1988) is an Icelandic actor and former professional footballer who played as a midfielder.

== Club career ==
Rúrik started his career with HK Kópavogur in his youth. Following a youth stint at R.S.C. Anderlecht, the then-champions of Belgium, he made his senior debut with HK Kópavogur.

At the end of August 2005, Rúrik signed for Charlton Athletic, but failed to make an appearance for Charlton's first team.

On 10 November 2020, Rúrik announced his retirement from football. He appeared on series 14 of the German TV programme Let’s Dance and won the competition.

== International career ==
In 2011, Rúrik was chosen as part of the Iceland U21 squad to represent Iceland at the 2011 UEFA European Under-21 Football Championship in Denmark. The striker was named on the bench for the opening game against Belarus.

In May 2018 he was named in Iceland's 23-man squad for the 2018 World Cup in Russia.

== Personal life ==
Rúrik was a candidate for the centre-right Independence Party in the 2016 Icelandic parliamentary election and 2017 Icelandic parliamentary election.

After Iceland's 2018 FIFA World Cup game against Argentina, Rúrik's Instagram profile went viral, as his followers increased by 250,000 after the game. His follower count was right over one million in June 2018, more than triple the size of Iceland's current population.

In 2021, Rúrik appeared in the action-comedy film Cop Secret, directed by Hannes Þór Halldórsson.

In 2021, he won Let's Dance in Germany with Renata Lusin.

Rúrik appeared in the Netflix comedy film Eat Pray Bark, released in 2026.

== Career statistics ==
=== International ===
Appearances and goals by national team and year
National team	Year	Apps	Goals
Iceland	2009	4	0
Iceland	2010	5	1
Iceland	2011	4	0
Iceland	2012	8	0
Iceland	2013	5	0
Iceland	2014	7	1
Iceland	2015	4	1
Iceland	2016	0	0
Iceland	2017	6	0
Iceland	2018	10	0
Total		53	3

Scores and results list Iceland's goal tally first, score column indicates score after each Rúrik goal.

List of international goals scored by Rúrik Gíslason
No.	Date	Venue	Opponent	Score	Result	Competition	Ref.
1	11 August 2010	Laugardalsvöllur, Reykjavík, Iceland	Liechtenstein	1–0	1–1	Friendly	
2	10 October 2014	Skonto Stadium, Riga, Latvia	Latvia	3–0	3–0	UEFA Euro 2016 qualifying	
3	31 March 2015	A. Le Coq Arena, Tallinn, Estonia	Estonia	1–0	1–1	Friendly	

== Honours ==
Copenhagen

- Danish Superliga: 2012–13
- Danish Cup: 2014–15
