= Franck Semou =

Danish footballer (born 1992)

Personal information
- Full name: Franck Semou
- Date of birth: 25 August 1992 (age 34)
- Place of birth: Copenhagen, Denmark
- Height: 1.76 m (5 ft 9 1/2 in)
- Position: Defensive midfielder

Youth career
- 2003–2006: KB
- 2006–2007: AB
- 2008–2009: Hvidovre IF
- 2010–2011: Brøndby IF

Senior career*
Years	Team	Apps	(Gls)
2009–2010	Hvidovre IF	40	(1)
2010–2014	Brøndby IF	27	(0)
2014	→ AB (loan)	8	(0)
2014–2015	Svebølle B&I	?	(?)
2015	Brumunddal	22	(6)
2016–2017	HamKam	10	(0)

International career
2009	Denmark U-17	1	(0)
2009–2010	Denmark U-18	7	(0)
2010–2011	Denmark U-19	11	(0)
2012	Denmark U-20	3	(0)
- * Club domestic league appearances and goals

Franck Semou (born 25 August 1992) is a Danish former professional football player, who most recently played as a defensive midfielder for HamKam.

On November 30, 2016, Semou was attacked outside HamKams training ground and beaten in the head with a hammer. Two men, one of them a member of Hells Angels, were later convicted for the attack in the lower courts.

== Career ==
Semou began his career with Kjøbenhavns Boldklub and in summer 2006 joined the youth team of Akademisk Boldklub. On 4 December 2007 left Akademisk Boldklub and signed for Hvidovre IF. Semou debuted for Hvidovre IF team 5 October 2008 against Viborg FF.

== International career ==
He is a former Denmark under-17 and Danish under-19 player.
