= Kolja Afriyie =

German footballer (born 1982)

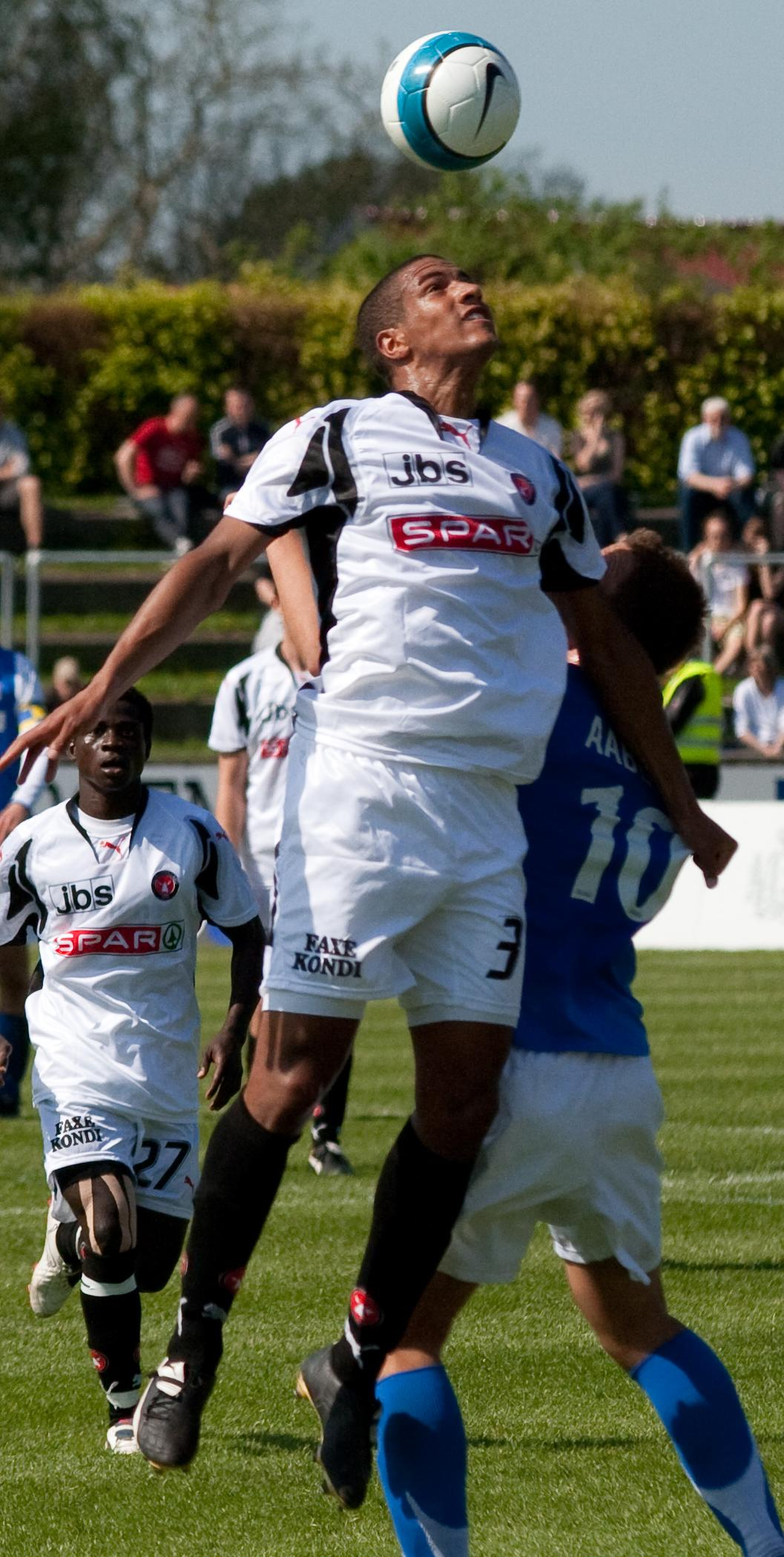
- Afriyie with FC Midtjylland in 2008

Personal information
- Date of birth: 6 April 1982 (age 44)
- Place of birth: Flensburg, West Germany
- Height: 1.88 m (6 ft 2 in)
- Position: Right-back

Youth career
- –1998: DGF Flensborg
- 1998–2000: Hamburger SV

Senior career*
Years	Team	Apps	(Gls)
1998–2000	Hamburger SV II		
2000–2004	AC Horsens	14	(0)
2004–2006	Esbjerg fB	54	(4)
2006–2010	FC Midtjylland	100	(4)
2010–2011	Energie Cottbus	15	(0)
2011–2014	FC Midtjylland	58	(0)
Total		241	(8)

International career
2002–2003	Germany U-21	4	(0)
- * Club domestic league appearances and goals

Kolja Afriyie (born 6 April 1982) is a German former professional footballer who played as a right-back. He holds both a Ghanaian passport and a German passport.

== Club career ==
Kolja Afriyie was born the son of a Ghanaian father and a German mother in Flensburg. He grew up in Flensburg and also visited in Flensburg both a kindergarten and a school that is part of the Danish minority. Playing football, he joined the DGF Flensborg, which also belongs to the Danish minority. In 1998, he joined the youth academy of Hamburger SV, but the contract was canceled again in 2000 because "of performance reasons" and because of school problems.

In 2001, he moved to Denmark, signing a contract with AC Horsens. In Horsens, he was initially part of the reserve team, but he quickly rose in the first team and was a top performer. In the summer of 2004, Afriyie moved to Danish Superliga club Esbjerg fB. His greatest games in his Esbjerg career were Intertoto Cup matches against Schalke 04. In 2006, he moved to Superliga rivals FC Midtjylland in Herning. On 28 October 2008, he signed a new contract keeping him at FC Midtjylland until 30 June 2011. On 22 June 2010, he left FC Midtjylland and returned to Germany to sign with FC Energie Cottbus. Only a year later, he broke up his contract and left the club. A short time later, he returned to FC Midtjylland. In May 2014, Afriyie retired his career at the age of 32 years.

== International career ==
Afriyie had played for the Schleswig-Holstein-selection and was discovered by Jürgen Kohler in the framework of the country Tournament of 2002. On 12 August 2002, Afriyie was first invited by Kohler for the Germany U21 national team when he was nominated for the friendly against Italy in Grosseto. On 20 August 2002, he appeared as a substitute in this game 88 minutes for Andreas Hinkel.

== Personal life ==
His father comes from Ghana, his mother is German, he is the brother of Kwaku Afriyie.
