= Cédric N'Koum =

Cameroonian footballer

Cedric N'Koum
Personal information
- Full name: Victor Cedric N'Koum
- Date of birth: 24 November 1989 (age 36)
- Place of birth: Douala, Cameroon
- Height: 1.74 m (5 ft 9 in)
- Position: Midfielder

Senior career*
Years	Team	Apps	(Gls)
2008–2009	Paris Saint-Germain B	21	(0)
2009–2010	Créteil	21	(0)
2010–2011	Red Star	28	(5)
2011–2012	Dunkerque	7	(1)
2012–2014	Odense Boldklub	22	(1)
2015–2016	Biel-Benne	5	(0)
2016–2018	Martigues	9	(0)
2018–2019	Houilles AC		
2019–2020	Paris Saint-Germain B	12	(0)
- * Club domestic league appearances and goals

Victor Cedric N'Koum (born 24 November 1989) is a Cameroonian former professional footballer who played as a midfielder.

== Career ==
N'Koum played first-tier football with Danish Superliga club Odense Boldklub.

In April 2015, while at Biel-Bienne, he suffered a cruciate ligament tear.

N'Koum joined Paris Saint-Germain Amateurs in the Championnat National 3 from amateur side Houilles AC in 2019.
