= Lasse Rise =

Danish footballer (born 1986)

Personal information
- Date of birth: June 9, 1986 (age 40)
- Place of birth: Denmark
- Height: 1.80 m (5 ft 11 in)
- Position: Forward

Team information
- Current team: FK Prespa

Youth career
- Brøndby IF
- BK Avarta

Senior career*
Years	Team	Apps	(Gls)
200?–2005	BK Avarta	45	(21)
2006–2011	Lyngby BK	62	(14)
2011–2014	Randers FC	37	(9)
2014–2016	Esbjerg fB	24	(4)
2016–2017	Lyngby BK	9	(0)
2017–2018	Keflavík ÍF	25	(5)
2019	Næstved BK	6	(0)
2019–	FK Prespa		
- * Club domestic league appearances and goals as of 19:21, 6 June 2019 (UTC)

Lasse Rise (born 9 June 1986) is a Danish professional footballer who plays in a forward position. He currently plays for Fodboldklubben Prespa.

On 6 December 2011, Rise was called up for Denmark's tour of Thailand in the following January.
