= Jacob Schoop =

Danish footballer (born 1988)

Personal information
- Full name: Jacob Toppel Schoop
- Date of birth: 23 December 1988 (age 37)
- Place of birth: Odense, Denmark
- Height: 1.76 m (5 ft 9 in)
- Position: Midfielder

Youth career
- Tarup-Paarup
- B1909

Senior career*
Years	Team	Apps	(Gls)
2007–2008	B1909		
2008–2011	FC Fyn	43	(5)
2012–2015	OB	61	(1)
2015–2016	KR Reykjavík	21	(1)
2016–2022	Vejle	137	(9)
2022–2024	Helsingør	53	(5)
2024–2025	Næstved	20	(1)
- * Club domestic league appearances and goals as of 19:46, 9 July 2025 (UTC)

Jacob Toppel Schoop (born 23 December 1988) is a Danish footballer who plays as a midfielder.

== Club career ==
Schoop began his career with lower league Odense sides Tarup-Paarup and B1909, before switching to FC Fyn in January 2008 after having a strong debut season for the B1909 first team in the Denmark Series. As a youth, Schoop had been offered a three-year contract with a team in the United States, but had turned it down in order to finish his education in Denmark.

In the summer of 2011, Schoop moved to Odense Boldklub (OB) from FC Fyn. He made nine appearances in the spring of 2012.

On 14 April 2015, Schoop signed for Icelandic side KR Reykjavík.

In July 2016, Schoop moved to Vejle Boldklub. Before the 2017–18 season, coach Adolfo Sormani named Schoop the captain of Vejle Boldklub. On 27 January 2022, Schoop made a surprising move to Danish 1st Division club FC Helsingør, where he signed a deal until June 2023. The contract was later extended with one year. After a season that ended in relegation for Helsingør, Schoop's contract was set to expire in the summer of 2024 and he left the club.

On 8 July 2024, newly relegated Danish 2nd Division side Næstved Boldklub confirmed that they had brought in Schoop in a flexible role where he would both play and coach at the club's sports college. He left squad at the end of the 2024–25 season.
