= Morten Skoubo =

Danish footballer (born 1980)

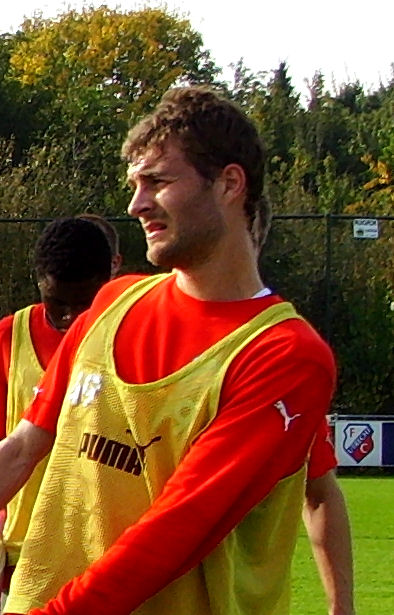
- Skoubo in training with Utrecht, 2008

Personal information
- Date of birth: 30 June 1980 (age 46)
- Place of birth: Holstebro, Denmark
- Height: 1.90 m (6 ft 3 in)
- Position: Forward

Youth career
- Struer
- Lemvig GF
- Stabæk
- Holstebro BK
- Ikast FS

Senior career*
| Years | Team | Apps | (Gls) |
| 1999–2002 | FC Midtjylland | 54 | (24) |
| 2002–2004 | Borussia Mönchengladbach | 28 | (4) |
| 2004 | → West Bromwich Albion (loan) | 2 | (0) |
| 2004–2006 | Brøndby IF | 41 | (19) |
| 2006–2008 | Real Sociedad | 30 | (5) |
| 2008–2011 | Utrecht | 13 | (1) |
| 2009–2011 | → Roda JC (loan) | 49 | (12) |
| 2011–2014 | OB | 70 | (11) |
| 2014–2015 | Delhi Dynamos FC | 8 | (0) |

International career
| 2000–2001 | Denmark U21 | 8 | (3) |
| 2003–2011 | Denmark | 6 | (1) |
- * Club domestic league appearances and goals

Morten Skoubo (Danish pronunciation: [ˈskʌwpoˀ]; born 30 June 1980) is a Danish former professional footballer who played as a forward. He made six appearances for the Denmark national team scoring once.

== Career ==
=== FC Midtjylland ===
Born in Holstebro, Skoubo played for a number of lower league clubs. He played eight games and scored three goals for the Danish under-21 national team. Skoubo's breakthrough came in the Danish Superliga club FC Midtjylland, when he scored 19 goals in 27 games during the 2001–02 season. When German club Borussia Mönchengladbach wanted him in the team at the start of the next season, Skoubo made the switch. While in Mönchengladbach, he made his debut for the Danish national team on 11 June 2003.

=== Borussia Mönchengladbach ===
Skoubo's club career in Borussia Mönchengladbach never took off and he was loaned out to English team West Bromwich Albion in January 2004. He was back at Gladbach again after six months, having only played two games for West Bromwich. For the 2004–05 Danish Superliga season, Danish Superliga runners-up Brøndby IF were looking for new strikers, following a season of poor goal-scoring. Skoubo moved back to Denmark in a €600,000 transfer deal.

=== Brøndby ===
In Brøndby he regained his good form from his Midtjylland days, and Skoubo formed a good partnership with Swedish international Johan Elmander, Skoubo playing as the targetman and Elmander playing in a deep-lying role, which was successful in securing the Double for Brøndby, winning both the Danish Superliga championship as well as the Danish Cup. In his one and a half years at the club, Skoubo scored 29 goals in 63 competitive matches, including two goals in three matches in the 2005–06 UEFA Cup. In January 2006, Skoubo signed for Spanish club Real Sociedad in a transfer deal worth €2.5 million.

=== Real Sociedad ===
On 19 February 2006, he scored the fifth fastest goal in La Liga history, bagging a goal after just 11 seconds against Valencia, even though the game was lost 2–1.

=== Netherlands ===
In August 2008, Skoubo was transferred to Dutch Eredivisie club FC Utrecht. He was not able to break through, and in summer 2009, he was loaned out to fellow Eredivisie side Roda JC. At Roda, Skoubo had some impressive displays, and seems to form a perfect partnership with fellow Dane, Mads Junker.

=== Odense Boldklub ===
On 22 June 2011, Skoubo signed with the Danish team Odense Boldklub. He got shirt number 11.

=== Delhi Dynamos ===
In July 2014, Morten signed for the Indian Super League side Delhi Dynamos.

== Honours ==
- Danish Superliga: 2004–05
- Danish Cup: 2004–05
