= Daniel Høegh =

Danish footballer (born 1991)

Personal information
- Full name: Daniel Mathias Høegh
- Date of birth: 6 January 1991 (age 35)
- Place of birth: Odense, Denmark
- Height: 1.90 m (6 ft 3 in)
- Position: Centre-back

Team information
- Current team: Randers
- Number: 3

Youth career
- 2004–2010: OB

Senior career*
Years	Team	Apps	(Gls)
2010–2015	OB	103	(5)
2015–2017	Basel	22	(0)
2017–2020	SC Heerenveen	71	(5)
2020–2022	Midtjylland	23	(0)
2022–	Randers	107	(9)

International career
2009–2010	Denmark U18	4	(0)
2009–2011	Denmark U19	9	(0)
2010–2011	Denmark U20	4	(0)
2011–2013	Denmark U21	6	(0)
2013	Denmark	1	(0)
- * Club domestic league appearances and goals as of 19 May 2026

Daniel Mathias Høegh (Danish pronunciation: [ˈhøːˀj]; born 6 January 1991) is a Danish professional footballer who plays as a centre-back for Randers FC. Høegh formerly played for SC Heerenveen, FC Basel, Odense Boldklub and Midtjylland.

== Career ==
Born in Odense, Denmark, Høegh started played for OB's youth ranks from 2004 to 2010. On 30 August 2010 he made his debut for the first team against FC Midtjylland and played all 90 minutes. He stayed with the club for five years.

On 2 June 2015, it was announced that Høegh joined Swiss club Basel on a free transfer. He joined Basel's first team for their 2015–16 season under head coach Urs Fischer. After playing in four test games, Høegh played his domestic league debut for the club in the home game in the St. Jakob-Park on 19 July 2015 as Basel won 2–0 against Vaduz. He scored his first goal for his new club on 28 October in the Swiss Cup game in away against local amateur club SV Muttenz as Basel won 5–1 to qualify for the quarter-finals.

However, in November Høegh injured himself and on 20 November the club announced that he would undergo surgery on the right meniscus and would miss all games until the New Year. Høegh returned to the squad in March 2016 and the first game that he played, coming in as a substitute, was in the 2015–16 UEFA Europa League knockout phase, in the round of 16, at home against Sevilla. Although he played in the next two games over 90 minutes he could not establish himself as regular starter. Under head coach Fischer, Basel, and with them Høegh, won the Swiss Super League championship at the end of the 2015–16 Super League season. For the club it was the seventh title in a row and their 19th championship title in total.

Again in the following season Høegh could not establish himself as regular player. In the Swiss Cup away match on 18 September 2016 Basel won 10 against Zug 94. The sole goal scorer was Hoegh with a header in the 45th minute. The central defender climbed highest at the far post following a corner from Jean-Paul Boëtius. At the end of Basel's 2016–17 season, Janko won the championship with the club for the second time. For the club this was the eighth title in a row and their 20th championship title in total. They also won the 2016–17 Swiss Cup, defeating Sion 3–0 in the final.

Nevertheless, Høegh and Basel did not extend their contract. During his two seasons with the club Høegh played a total of 46 games for Basel scoring a total of three goals. 22 of these games were in the Swiss Super League, three in the Swiss Cup, six in the UEFA competitions (Champions League and Europa League) and 15 were friendly games. He scored the above-mentioned two goals in the cup, the other was scored during the test games.

On 14 June 2017 Basel announced that Høegh had signed for SC Heerenveen.

On 5 October 2020, Høegh joined Danish Superliga champions FC Midtjylland on a free transfer. After two years at Midtjylland, Høegh signed a three-year deal with Randers FC on 19 July 2022.

== Career statistics ==
As of match played 3 August 2024

Appearances and goals by club, season and competition
Club	Season	League			National Cup (Note: Includes Danish Cup, Swiss Cup, KNVB Cup)		Continental		Total	
Club	Season	Division	Apps	Goals	Apps	Goals	Apps	Goals	Apps	Goals
OB	2010–11	Superligaen	12	1	0	0	1 (Note: Appearance(s) in UEFA Europa League)	0	13	1
OB	2011–12	Superligaen	22	0	1	0	5 (Note: Two appearances in UEFA Champions League and three in UEFA Europa League)	0	28	0
OB	2012–13	Superligaen	25	0	3	2	0	0	28	2
OB	2013–14	Superligaen	20	1	2	0	0	0	22	1
OB	2014–15	Superligaen	25	3	0	0	0	0	25	3
OB	Total		104	5	6	2	6	0	116	7
Basel	2015–16	Super League	12	0	1	1	6 (Note: Three appearances in UEFA Champions League and three in UEFA Europa League)	0	19	1
Basel	2016–17	Super League	10	0	2	1	0	0	12	1
Basel	Total		22	0	3	2	6	0	31	2
Heerenveen	2017–18	Eredivisie	36	3	2	0	—		38	3
Heerenveen	2018–19	Eredivisie	31	2	3	0	—		34	2
Heerenveen	2019–20	Eredivisie	4	0	2	1	—		6	1
Heerenveen	Total		71	5	7	1	—		78	6
Midtjylland	2020–21	Superligaen	4	0	4	1	1 (Note: Appearance(s) in UEFA Champions League)	0	9	1
Midtjylland	2021–22	Superligaen	19	0	3	0	2 (Note: One appearance in UEFA Champions League, one appearance and one goal in UEFA Conference League)	1	24	1
Midtjylland	Total		23	0	7	1	3	1	33	2
Randers	2022–23	Superligaen	18	2	2	0	—		20	2
Randers	2023–24	Superligaen	28	2	1	0	—		29	2
Randers	Total		46	4	3	0	—		49	2
Career total			266	14	26	6	15	1	307	21

== Honours ==
FC Basel

- Swiss Super League: 2015–16, 2016–17
- Swiss Cup: 2016–17

Individual

- Danish Superliga Team of the Year: 2024–25
