= Kalilou Traoré =

Malian footballer (1987–2026)

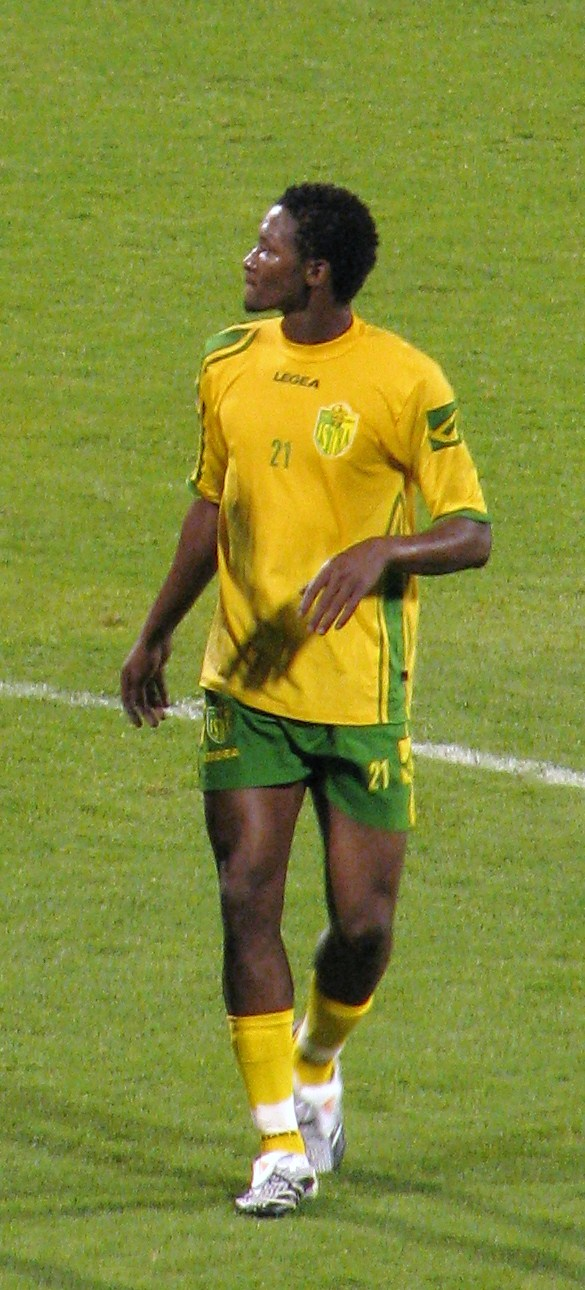
- Traoré playing for Istra 1961

Personal information
- Full name: Kalilou Mohamed Traoré
- Date of birth: 9 September 1987
- Place of birth: Bamako, Mali
- Date of death: 24 July 2026 (aged 38)
- Height: 1.92 m (6 ft 4 in)
- Position: Midfielder

Senior career*
Years	Team	Apps	(Gls)
2005–2006	Real Bamako	43	(10)
2006–2008	Wydad Casablanca	16	(5)
2007–2008	→ Hassania Agadir (loan)	12	(2)
2008–2010	Istra 1961	52	(14)
2010–2012	OB	51	(8)
2012–2014	Sochaux	11	(0)
Total		185	(39)

International career
2010–2013	Mali	16	(1)
Medal record
Men's football
Representing Mali
Africa Cup of Nations
Third place	2013 South Africa
- * Club domestic league appearances and goals

Kalilou Mohamed Traoré (9 September 1987 – 24 July 2026) was a Malian professional footballer who played as midfielder.

== Club career ==
Traoré began his career with Real Bamako in 2005. He signed a contract with Wydad Casablanca in the summer of 2006. In July 2007 he played on loan to Hassania Agadir and returned to Wydad Casablanca on 14 July 2008.

He signed with Istra 1961 in August 2008. After his successful first season with 9 goals in 27 games, he was linked with Hajduk Split and Dinamo Zagreb.

Traoré signed with OB in 2010.

In September 2012, Traoré joined Sochaux. In June 2014, he agreed the termination of his contract with Sochaux.

== International career ==
Traoré made 16 appearances for Mali between 2010 and 2013, scoring his only goal in a qualifying match against the Botswana.

Traoré received his first call-up to the Mali national team for a 2012 Africa Cup of Nations qualification match against Cape Verde. He started the match and earned his first international cap on 4 September 2010, as Mali lost 1–0.

== Death ==
Traore died in a road traffic collision on 24 July 2026, at the age of 38.

== Honours ==
Mali

- Africa Cup of Nations bronze: 2013
