= Emil Larsen =

Danish footballer (born 1991)

Personal information
- Date of birth: 22 June 1991 (age 35)
- Place of birth: Copenhagen, Denmark
- Height: 1.81 m (5 ft 11 in)
- Position: Left winger

Youth career
- Lyngby

Senior career*
Years	Team	Apps	(Gls)
2009–2012	Lyngby	83	(25)
2012–2016	OB	108	(17)
2016	Columbus Crew SC	3	(0)
2016–2017	Lyngby	4	(0)
Total		198	(42)

International career
2006–2007	Denmark U16	2	(0)
2007	Denmark U17	16	(1)
2008	Denmark U18	7	(0)
2009	Denmark U19	13	(3)
2011–2012	Denmark U21	12	(4)
2012–2014	Denmark	7	(0)
2016	Denmark Olympic	3	(0)

Managerial career
- 2017–2019: Lyngby (scout)
- * Club domestic league appearances and goals

Emil Larsen (born 22 June 1991) is a Danish former professional footballer. He has gained seven caps for the Denmark national team, and represented Denmark at the 2016 Summer Olympics in Brazil.

== Club career ==
In his first season as a professional for Lyngby Boldklub, after joining the first team in fall 2009, he gained high praise from coach Niels Frederiksen. Also, there were both domestic and international clubs who showed interest in the young player, especially considering his contract was expiring in 2011.

Larsen became topscorer for the club in the 2009–10 Danish 1st Division campaign, and was therefore a key player in securing promotion to the Danish Superliga. This also meant an increased number of expectations of the young midfielder.

On 9 July 2012, Larsen joined Odense Boldklub on a four-year contract.

He signed with Major League Soccer side Columbus Crew SC on 22 January 2016. After struggling for playing time in the United States, Larsen returned to Denmark on 10 July 2016, signing with his former club Lyngby BK.

On 23 July 2017, Larsen announced his retirement due to a knee injury. He also revealed, that he would continue at the club working as a scout.

== After football ==
Larsen became self-employed after his retirement from football, founding the startup company Smartiie in 2018, which makes shin guards.

In 2021, he became employed as a real estate investor at MM Properties. In November 2022, he became a certified real estate investor, completing the education at level 1.
