= 2012–13 Danish Superliga =

23rd season of Danish Superliga

Danish Superliga
- Season: 2012–13
- Champions: FC Copenhagen
- Relegated: Horsens; Silkeborg
- Champions League: Copenhagen; Nordsjælland
- Europa League: Randers; Aalborg BK; Esbjerg (via domestic cup)
- Matches: 198
- Goals: 561 (2.83 per match)
- Top goalscorer: Andreas Cornelius (18 goals)
- Biggest home win: SønderjyskE 6–1 Randers; Nordsjælland 6–1 Silkeborg; Copenhagen 5–0 Silkeborg; OB 5–0 SønderjyskE
- Biggest away win: Silkeborg 0–5 SønderjyskE
- Highest scoring: Esbjerg 6–2 OB
- Longest winning run: 9 games Copenhagen
- Longest unbeaten run: 13 games Copenhagen
- Longest winless run: 12 games Brøndby
- Longest losing run: 5 games Horsens; Silkeborg
- Highest attendance: 33.215; Copenhagen 1–1 SønderjyskE
- Lowest attendance: 0 Brøndby 0–0 AGF; Brøndby 0–0 SønderjyskE

The 2012–13 Danish Superliga season was the 23rd season of the Danish Superliga, which decided the Danish football championship. It marked the 100 year anniversary of the first ever Danish Football Championship, held in 1912–13.

The season began on 13 July 2012 and ended on 20 May 2013.

== Teams ==
Lyngby Boldklub and HB Køge finished the 2011–12 season in 11th and 12th place, respectively, and were relegated to the 2012–13 1st Division.

The relegated teams were replaced by 2011–12 1st Division champions Esbjerg fB and runners-up Randers FC.

=== Stadia and locations ===
Location of teams in 2012–13 Danish Superliga

Club	Location	Stadium	Turf	Capacity	2011–12 position
AaB	Aalborg	Energi Nord Arena	Natural	13,797	7th
AC Horsens	Horsens	CASA Arena Horsens	Natural	10,400	4th
AGF	Aarhus	NRGi Park	Natural	20,032	5th
Brøndby IF	Brøndby	Brøndby Stadium	Natural	29,000	9th
Esbjerg fB	Esbjerg	Blue Water Arena	Natural	18,000	1D, 1st
FC Copenhagen	Copenhagen	Parken	Natural	38,065	2nd
FC Midtjylland	Herning	MCH Arena	Natural	11,800	3rd
FC Nordsjælland	Farum	Farum Park	Artificial	9,900	1st
OB	Odense	TRE-FOR Park	Natural	15,633	10th
Randers FC	Randers	AutoC Park Randers	Natural	12,000	1D, 2nd
Silkeborg IF	Silkeborg	Mascot Park	Natural	10,000	8th
SønderjyskE	Haderslev	Haderslev Fodboldstadion	Natural	10,000	6th

=== Personnel and sponsoring ===
Note: Flags indicate national team as has been defined under FIFA eligibility rules. Players and Managers may hold more than one non-FIFA nationality.

Team	Head coach	Captain	Kit manufacturer	Shirt sponsor
AaB	(Denmark) Kent Nielsen	(Denmark) Thomas Augustinussen	adidas	Spar Nord
AC Horsens	(Denmark) Johnny Mølby	(Denmark) Martin Retov	hummel	Telia Stofa
AGF	(Denmark) Peter Sørensen	(Denmark) Steffen Rasmussen	hummel	YouSee
Brøndby IF	(Lithuania) Aurelijus Skarbalius	(United States) Clarence Goodson	hummel	UNICEF
Esbjerg fB	(Denmark) Jess Thorup	(Denmark) Nicolai Høgh	Nike	Sydenergi
F.C. Copenhagen	(Belgium) Ariël Jacobs	(Denmark) Lars Jacobsen	adidas	Carlsberg
FC Midtjylland	(Denmark) Glen Riddersholm	(Denmark) Kristian Bak Nielsen	Wunderelf	Nordea
FC Nordsjælland	(Denmark) Kasper Hjulmand	(Denmark) Nicolai Stokholm	Diadora	City Container
OB	(Denmark) Troels Bech	(Denmark) Anders Møller Christensen	Puma	Carlsberg
Randers FC	(England) Colin Todd	(Denmark) Søren Pedersen	Warrior	Verdo
Silkeborg IF	(Denmark) Viggo Jensen	(Denmark) Henrik Pedersen	uhlsport	Mascot International
SønderjyskE	(Denmark) Lars Søndergaard	(Denmark) Henrik Hansen	Diadora	Frøs Herreds Sparekasse

=== Managerial changes ===
Team	Outgoing manager	Manner of departure	Date of vacancy	Replaced by	Date of appointment	Position in table
Odense BK	(Denmark) Poul Hansen	End of tenure as caretaker	24 May 2012	(Denmark) Troels Bech	24 May 2012	Pre-Season
Silkeborg IF	(Denmark) Troels Bech	Signed by Odense BK	24 May 2012	(Denmark) Keld Bordinggaard	1 June 2012	Pre-Season
F.C. Copenhagen	(Denmark) Carsten V. Jensen	Resigned	25 May 2012	(Belgium) Ariël Jacobs	22 June 2012	Pre-Season
Randers FC	(Denmark) Michael Hemmingsen	Sacked	5 July 2012	(England) Colin Todd	5 July 2012	Pre-Season
Silkeborg IF	(Denmark) Keld Bordinggaard	Sacked	11 November 2012	(Denmark) Viggo Jensen	11 November 2012	12th

== League table ==
Pos	Team	Pld	W	D	L	GF	GA	GD	Pts	Qualification or relegation
1	Copenhagen (C)	33	18	11	4	62	32	+30	65	Qualification for the Champions League group stage
2	Nordsjælland	33	17	9	7	60	37	+23	60	Qualification for the Champions League third qualifying round
3	Randers FC	33	15	7	11	36	42	−6	52	Qualification for the Europa League third qualifying round
4	Esbjerg fB	33	13	8	12	38	32	+6	47	Qualification for the Europa League play-off round
5	AaB	33	13	8	12	51	46	+5	47	Qualification for the Europa League second qualifying round
6	Midtjylland	33	12	11	10	51	47	+4	47	
7	AGF	33	11	8	14	50	49	+1	41	
8	SønderjyskE	33	12	5	16	53	57	−4	41	
9	Brøndby	33	9	12	12	39	45	−6	39	
10	OB	33	10	8	15	52	59	−7	38	
11	Horsens (R)	33	8	10	15	31	49	−18	34	Relegation to Danish 1st Division
12	Silkeborg IF (R)	33	8	7	18	38	66	−28	31	Relegation to Danish 1st Division

Source: Danish Football Association (in Danish)
Rules for classification: 1) points; 2) goal difference; 3) number of goals scored.
(C) Champions; (R) Relegated

=== Positions by round ===
Team ╲ Round	1	2	3	4	5	6	7	8	9	10	11	12	13	14	15	16	17	18	19	20	21	22	23	24	25	26	27	28	29	30	31	32	33
Copenhagen	3	2	2	1	1	1	1	1	1	1	1	1	1	1	1	1	1	1	1	1	1	1	1	1	1	1	1	1	1	1	1	1	1
Nordsjælland	2	3	4	7	5	4	2	3	3	3	3	4	3	3	2	2	2	2	2	2	2	2	3	2	2	2	2	2	2	2	2	2	2
Randers FC	12	9	3	6	4	3	5	5	7	7	5	5	5	5	5	6	4	5	6	5	3	3	2	3	3	3	3	3	4	3	3	3	3
Esbjerg fB	8	11	12	12	12	12	12	12	12	10	11	11	10	10	10	10	10	8	9	10	9	9	9	9	7	7	6	7	5	5	5	4	4
AaB	6	4	8	9	6	5	3	2	2	2	2	2	2	2	3	3	3	3	3	3	4	4	4	4	5	4	4	4	3	4	4	5	5
Midtjylland	10	5	5	3	7	8	8	7	8	8	9	9	9	9	8	8	8	9	10	8	7	7	7	7	8	8	7	6	7	6	6	6	6
AGF	6	10	11	8	9	9	7	6	4	4	4	3	4	4	4	4	5	6	5	6	6	6	5	6	6	6	8	8	8	9	7	7	7
SønderjyskE	1	1	1	2	2	6	6	9	9	9	7	8	8	8	9	9	9	10	8	9	10	10	11	10	11	10	9	9	9	8	9	8	8
Brøndby	9	12	9	10	10	10	10	10	10	11	12	12	12	12	12	11	12	11	12	12	12	12	10	11	10	9	10	10	10	10	11	10	9
OB	5	6	6	4	3	2	4	4	5	5	6	6	6	6	6	5	6	4	4	4	5	5	6	5	4	5	5	5	6	7	8	9	10
Horsens	11	8	7	5	8	7	9	8	6	6	8	7	7	7	7	7	7	7	7	7	8	8	8	8	9	11	11	11	11	11	10	11	11
Silkeborg IF	4	7	10	10	11	11	11	11	11	12	10	10	11	11	11	12	11	12	11	11	11	11	12	12	12	12	12	12	12	12	12	12	12

Source: kicker.de

== Results ==
=== Matchday 1–11 ===
Home \ Away	AaB	ACH	AGF	BIF	EfB	FCK	FCM	FCN	OB	RFC	SIF	SJE
AaB				2–1	0–2		3–0	1–1		4–0		
Horsens	1–4		1–4			1–1	2–2	0–4	2–2			
AGF	1–1			3–1	0–0		3–2	0–1				2–2
Brøndby		2–2			1–1				0–1		2–1	0–1
Esbjerg fB		0–0				1–2			3–0		2–3	1–2
Copenhagen	3–0		3–0	1–1			4–2	2–1			5–0	
Midtjylland				1–1	1–0			3–1		2–1	1–1	1–3
Nordsjælland				0–0	3–0				1–1	1–1	6–1	4–1
OB	0–4		1–2			2–2	2–1			0–1		
Randers FC		0–1	2–1	3–2	1–0	2–3						
Silkeborg IF	2–1	0–2	0–4						0–1	0–1		
SønderjyskE	0–4	0–2				1–1			1–2	6–1	0–2	

Source: Danish Football Association (in Danish)
Legend: Blue = home team win; Yellow = draw; Red = away team win.

=== Matchday 12–33 ===
Home \ Away	AaB	ACH	AGF	BIF	EfB	FCK	FCM	FCN	OB	RFC	SIF	SJE
AaB		2–0	0–3	1–1	0–0	1–1	1–3	0–1	2–2	1–1	1–0	2–1
Horsens	2–2		2–0	0–1	0–0	1–0	0–2	0–2	2–0	1–0	2–0	1–3
AGF	3–0	0–0		0–3	0–1	0–2	1–1	0–2	2–1	1–1	3–3	2–1
Brøndby	1–3	2–0	3–2		2–2	0–0	1–1	4–0	0–3	0–2	2–2	0–3
Esbjerg fB	1–0	1–0	2–1	1–0		2–2	0–1	1–0	6–2	4–0	1–0	1–2
Copenhagen	4–0	2–1	0–0	1–0	0–2		2–1	4–1	1–1	2–0	3–1	1–1
Midtjylland	2–3	5–2	3–2	1–1	0–0	2–2		1–1	1–1	3–0	1–3	1–0
Nordsjælland	1–0	1–0	4–2	3–0	1–0	2–3	3–1		4–1	2–2	3–0	2–2
OB	3–4	2–0	2–4	1–2	3–0	2–3	0–1	3–0		0–0	3–3	5–0
Randers FC	0–1	0–0	1–0	0–1	2–1	1–0	2–1	0–0	3–2		1–0	2–0
Silkeborg IF	3–2	1–1	3–1	1–2	0–1	1–0	1–1	2–2	0–2	1–2		0–5
SønderjyskE	1–0	4–2	0–3	2–2	3–1	1–2	0–2	1–2	4–1	0–2	2–3	

Source: Danish Football Association (in Danish)
Legend: Blue = home team win; Yellow = draw; Red = away team win.

== Top goalscorers ==
Rank	Player	Club	Goals
1	(Denmark) Andreas Cornelius	Copenhagen	18
2	(Denmark) Nicklas Helenius	AaB	16
3	(United States) Aron Jóhannsson	AGF	14
3	(Denmark) Simon Makienok	Brøndby	14
3	(Germany) Marvin Pourie	Silkeborg IF	14
3	(Denmark) Ronnie Schwartz	Randers FC	14
7	(Denmark) Lasse Vibe	SønderjyskE	12
8	(Denmark) Nicolai Jørgensen	Copenhagen	11
8	(Brazil) César Santin	Copenhagen	11
10	(Netherlands) Joshua John	Nordsjælland	10

== Attendances ==
No.	Club	Average	Highest
1	FC København	15,926	33,215
2	Brøndby IF	9,166	21,186
3	AGF	8,043	14,676
4	OB	7,320	10,314
5	AaB	6,897	10,794
6	Esbjerg fB	6,647	9,345
7	FC Nordsjælland	5,827	10,300
8	FC Midtjylland	5,800	9,552
9	Randers FC	5,240	7,850
10	AC Horsens	3,970	9,487
11	Silkeborg IF	3,151	4,111
12	SønderjyskE	3,005	6,575
