= Troels Bech =

Danish footballer and manager (born 1966)

Personal information
- Date of birth: 29 July 1966 (age 60)
- Place of birth: Svendborg, Denmark
- Positions: Defender; midfielder

Senior career*
Years	Team	Apps	(Gls)
–1987	Svendborg fB	–	(-)
1987	Greuther Fürth	7	(0)
1987	Svendborg fB	-	(-)
1988–1994	Silkeborg IF	177	(-)

Managerial career
- 1994–1996: Viborg FF (asst)
- 1997: Hjortshøj-Egå IF (women)
- 1998–1999: Horsens
- 1999–2000: Ikast fS
- 2000–2002: OB
- 2002–2003: Midtjylland
- 2004–2005: OB
- 2006–2008: Esbjerg fB
- 2009–2012: Silkeborg
- 2012–2014: OB
- 2015–2018: Brøndby (sports director)
- 2020: Esbjerg fB
- 2024-: OB (sports director)
- * Club domestic league appearances and goals

Troels Bech (born 29 July 1966) is a Danish professional football manager and former player, who managed Odense Boldklub (OB) to the 2002 Danish Cup trophy. He was the manager of Danish club Esbjerg fB until November 2008 and took over Danish club Silkeborg IF in January 2009. During his active career, he most prominently won the 1994 Danish Superliga championship with Silkeborg IF.

He was most recently managing Esbjerg fB.

== Biography ==
Born in Svendborg, Bech started his career in Svendborg fB in the secondary Danish 2nd Division under manager Viggo Jensen. In 1987, Bech moved to Germany to play for Greuther Fürth in the Bayernliga. He played seven league games for Greuther Fürth as a midfielder, before he moved back to Svendborg. In 1988, Bech was reunited with Viggo Jensen, when he moved to play for Danish top-flight club Silkeborg IF.

In his first years at Silkeborg, Bech played as a central defender. He took most of Silkeborg's set pieces, and managed to score four goals in two games during the 1990 season; three penalty kicks and a goal directly on corner kick. Still a part of the team, Bech eventually found himself as a left defender. He won the 1994 Danish Superliga championship with Silkeborg, before ending his playing career later that year. At 27 years of age, he was declared medically unfit to play football, due to a recurringly injured Achilles tendon.

He soon began his coaching career, as assistant manager of Viborg FF in the Danish 1st Division. Serving under manager Viggo Jensen, Bech helped Viborg win promotion to the Superliga in 1995. He became manager of women's team Hjortshøj-Egå, with whom he won the 1997 Danish Elitedivision championship. He went on to coach 1st Division club AC Horsens, before he signed with league rivals Ikast FS. Shortly thereafter, Ikast merged with Herning Fremad to form FC Midtjylland (FCM). Bech was deemed surplus, as Herning manager Ove Pedersen went on to coach FCM.

In 2000, he became the manager of Superliga club Odense BK, which he guided to the 2002 Danish Cup trophy. He moved back to FCM in 2002, and managed the club to the 2003 Danish Cup final. He was fired by FCM in December 2003, due to bad results. He had another stint as Odense manager from 2004 to 2005, before he was signed as manager of Esbjerg fB in October 2005, effective from January 2006.

After a series of disappointing results in the Danish Superliga and after being allowed to leave the club to enter talks with SK Brann, Bech resigned on November 16, 2008.

December 2008 Bech was appointed manager of Danish club Silkeborg IF from January 2009 after the club had sacked former manager Peder Knudsen due to disappointing results.

Bech was announced as new manager of Odense Boldklub at the beginning of the 2012-13 Danish Superliga season. He was sacked on 30 September 2014 following a poor start to the 2014-15 season.

On 19 June 2015, Troels Bech was hired as sports director for Brøndby IF. He worked in this capacity until 31 December 2018 and decided to take a hiatus from football in 2019.

In June 2020 he was announced as manager of struggling Esbjerg fB in the Danish Superliga on a contract running for the rest of the season.

In May 2024 he was announced as sports director of Odense Boldklub, two days after their relegation from the Danish Superliga.

== Honours ==
=== As player ===
Silkeborg

- Danish Superliga: 1993–94

=== As coach ===
Hjortshøj-Egå

- Danish Elitedivision: 1996–97

Odense

- Danish Cup: 2001–02
