= Mads Toppel =

Danish footballer (born 1982)

Personal information
- Date of birth: 30 January 1982 (age 44)
- Place of birth: Odense, Denmark
- Height: 1.92 m (6 ft 4 in)
- Position: Goalkeeper

Youth career
- Næsby BK
- OB

Senior career*
Years	Team	Apps	(Gls)
2001–2003	OB	3	(0)
2003–2005	B1909		
2005–2007	Randers FC	99	(0)
2007–2010	Næstved BK		
2010–2011	Tromsø IL	20	(0)
2011–2015	OB	79	(0)
2015–2017	Brøndby IF	1	(0)

International career
2001	Denmark U-21	2	(0)
- * Club domestic league appearances and goals

Mads Toppel (born 30 January 1982) is a Danish former professional footballer who played as a goalkeeper.

== Honours ==
Randers

- Danish Cup: 2005–06
