= Anders Møller Christensen =

Danish footballer (born 1977)

Personal information
- Full name: Anders Møller Christensen
- Date of birth: 26 July 1977 (age 49)
- Place of birth: Denmark
- Height: 1.87 m (6 ft 2 in)
- Position: Centre back

Youth career
- Fakse Ladeplads IF
- Næstved BK

Senior career*
Years	Team	Apps	(Gls)
1995–1999	Næstved BK		
1999–2002	Gent	57	(3)
2002–2006	Esbjerg fB	120	(9)
2006–2014	OB	236	(2)
2014–2016	FC Roskilde	34	(0)

International career
2008–2009	Denmark	6	(0)

Managerial career
- 2017: FC Roskilde (caretaker)
- * Club domestic league appearances and goals as of 9 November 2015

Anders Møller Christensen (born 26 July 1977) is a Danish retired footballer.

== International career ==
Møller Christensen was called up for the league national team, which played a number of unofficial national team games in the United States, El Salvador and Honduras in January 2007, by national team manager Morten Olsen. Later in 2007, he was also called up as backup on the center-back position for the A national team, without getting his debut. This came, when the team had injury problems in 2008, and Anders Møller Christensen earned his cap in a friendly match against the Netherlands on 29 May.
