= Bashkim Kadrii =

Danish footballer (born 1991)

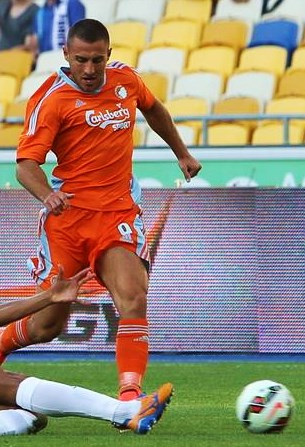

Personal information
- Full name: Bashkim Kadrii
- Date of birth: 9 July 1991 (age 35)
- Place of birth: Copenhagen, Denmark
- Height: 1.76 m (5 ft 9 in)
- Positions: Forward; winger

Youth career
- 1997–2005: B.93

Senior career*
Years	Team	Apps	(Gls)
2005–2010	B.93	30	(18)
2010–2014	OB	98	(19)
2014–2018	FC Copenhagen	27	(3)
2017	→ Minnesota United (loan)	11	(0)
2017–2018	→ Randers FC (loan)	18	(5)
2018–2020	OB	47	(20)
2020–2021	Al-Fateh	14	(2)
2021–2024	OB	98	(22)
Total		343	(89)

International career
2008–2010	Denmark U18	4	(2)
2009–2010	Denmark U19	18	(6)
2010	Denmark U20	1	(1)
2011–2013	Denmark U21	2	(1)
2011	Denmark	1	(0)
- * Club domestic league appearances and goals

Bashkim Kadrii (born 9 July 1991) is a Danish former professional footballer who played as a forward or a winger. He represented Denmark at senior international level.

== Club career ==
=== Denmark ===
Kadrii began his career with B.93 in the Danish 2nd Division East, where he was the top goal scorer for the club, In late 2009 Danish media wrote that both OB and Borussia Dortmund were in the chase for the young attacker, but he opted for OB, signing a four-year contract in Odense in mid-2010.

After OB sacked head coach Lars Olsen, assistant coach Viggo Jensen and director of sports Kim Brink on 13 September, Kadrii was handed his senior debut three days later, in the Europa League match away against Getafe, with OB losing 2–1.

He scored his first hattrick for OB on 5 December 2011 against SønderjyskE, when OB won 4–0 in the last round before the winter break.

In the summer transfer window of 2014, Kadrii signed a four-year contract with Danish vice-champions FC Copenhagen and received the number 9 shirt. He scored the lone goal in the 1–0 win against Brøndby IF securing Copenhagen a vital win over their bitter rivals.

=== Major League Soccer ===
Kadrii was sent to MLS side Minnesota United FC on 8 February 2017, on loan from FC Copenhagen.

=== Al-Fateh SC ===
On 27 January 2020 it was confirmed, that Kadrii had joined Saudi club Al-Fateh SC.

=== Return to OB and retirement ===
On 9 February 2021, Kadrii rejoined OB on a free transfer, signing a deal until the summer of 2024.

Upon his contract expiring in June 2024, he retired from professional football having totalled 64 goals in 278 appearances for OB.

== International career ==
Kadrii has played 18 games for the Denmark national under-19 football team and scored six goals, and played four games for the Denmark national under-18 football team and scored two goals. He was also a part of the Denmark national under-20 football team and Denmark national under-21 football team.

== Honours ==
Copenhagen

- Danish Superliga: 2015–16
- Danish Cup: 2014–15, 2015–16
