= 2019–20 Danish 1st Division =

80th season of Danish 1st Division

NordicBet Liga
- Season: 2019–20
- Champions: Vejle; 8th Danish 1st Division title 4th title at second-tier level
- Promoted: Vejle
- Relegated: Nykøbing; Roskilde; Næstved
- Matches: 198
- Goals: 572 (2.89 per match)
- Top goalscorer: Kjartan Finnbogason; Martin Koch Helsted (17 goals each)
- Biggest home win: Viborg 5–0 Fremad Amager (18 October 2019)
- Biggest away win: Nykøbing 0–5 Fredericia (20 October 2019)
- Highest scoring: Vejle 5–3 Hvidovre (21 June 2020)
- Highest attendance: 4,945; Vejle 3–0 Kolding (19 October 2019)
- Lowest attendance: 180; Roskilde 2–2 HB Køge (14 June 2020)
- Average attendance: 1,014

The 2019–20 Danish 1st Division (known as the NordicBet Liga due to sponsorship by NordicBet) marked the 24th season of the league operating as the second tier of Danish football and the 80th season overall under the 1st Division name. The league is governed by the Danish Football Association (DBU).

The division champion earned promotion to the 2020–21 Danish Superliga, while the teams finishing in 10th, 11th, and 12th places were relegated to the 2020–21 Danish 2nd Divisions. This adjustment to the usual promotion and relegation format was implemented due to the reduction of the Danish Superliga to 12 teams for the following season.

== Effects of the COVID-19 pandemic ==
The 2019–20 Danish 1st Division season was suspended on 12 March 2020 following a directive from the Danish Football Association (DBU), after Prime Minister Mette Frederiksen advised that all public activities be limited or suspended for an initial period of two weeks due to the COVID-19 pandemic. The suspension, originally set to end on 29 March, was subsequently extended to 13 April.

Following several months of uncertainty, Divisionsforeningen, the governing body of the professional leagues, announced that the 1st Division would resume on the weekend of 30–31 May 2020. This coincided with the restart of the Danish Superliga, which resumed on 28 May.

To facilitate a safe return, Divisionsforeningen published a 55-page health and safety protocol outlining mandatory COVID-19 testing and operational guidelines. All players and staff were required to undergo testing prior to the resumption and at regular intervals throughout the remaining fixtures. The plan was submitted to the Danish Ministry of Culture for approval, with the objective of completing the season by the end of June.

In line with temporary amendments approved by FIFA and the International Football Association Board (IFAB), the league adopted a rule allowing five substitutions per team per match, instead of the usual three. However, teams were permitted only three substitution intervals per match, excluding halftime. The change was introduced to mitigate the risk of injuries following the extended layoff and was agreed upon in consultation with clubs and health authorities.

== Participants ==
Vejle Boldklub were relegated to the 1st Division after finishing last in the 2018–19 Danish Superliga relegation play-offs, marking the end of a single season in the top tier. Vendsyssel FF were also relegated, having lost their relegation play-off to Lyngby Boldklub. Conversely, Silkeborg IF and Lyngby earned promotion to the Danish Superliga for the 2019–20 season.

FC Helsingør and Thisted FC were relegated to the 2019–20 Danish 2nd Divisions. Helsingør suffered a second consecutive relegation, having dropped from the Superliga the previous season, while Thisted returned to the third tier after two seasons in the Danish 1st Division. Skive IK and Kolding IF secured promotion from the 2018–19 Danish 2nd Divisions. Skive returned after just one season's absence, while Kolding gained promotion to the second tier for the first time since the 2010–11 season, when the club competed as part of the now-defunct Kolding FC.

=== Stadia and locations ===
Locations of the 2019–20 Danish 1st Division teams.

| Club | Location | Stadium | Turf | Capacity | 2018–19 position |
|---|---|---|---|---|---|
| FC Fredericia | Fredericia | Monjasa Park | Natural | 4,000 | 6th |
| FC Roskilde | Roskilde | Roskilde Idrætspark | Natural | 6,000 | 9th |
| BK Fremad Amager | Copenhagen | Sundby Idrætspark | Artificial | 7,200 | 5th |
| HB Køge | Herfølge/Køge | Capelli Sport Stadion | Artificial | 4,000 | 7th |
| Hvidovre IF | Hvidovre | Pro Ventilation Arena | Natural | 12,000 | 10th |
| Kolding IF | Kolding | Autocentralen Park | Natural | 10,000 | 2D, 2nd |
| Nykøbing FC | Nykøbing Falster | CM Arena | Natural | 10,000 | 8th |
| Næstved BK | Næstved | ProfaGroupPark | Natural | 7,500 | 4th |
| Skive IK | Skive | Hancock Arena | Natural | 10,000 | 2D, 1st |
| Vejle BK | Vejle | Vejle Stadion | Natural | 10,418 | Superliga, 14th |
| Vendsyssel FF | Hjørring | Nord Energi Arena | Natural | 10,000 | Superliga, 12th |
| Viborg FF | Viborg | Energi Viborg Arena | Natural | 9,566 | 2nd |

=== Personnel and sponsoring ===
Note: Flags indicate national team as has been defined under FIFA eligibility rules. Players and Managers may hold more than one non-FIFA nationality.

| Team | Head coach | Captain | Kit manufacturer | Shirt sponsor |
|---|---|---|---|---|
| FC Fredericia | (Denmark) Jonas Dal | (Denmark) Christian Ege Nielsen | Hummel | Monjasa |
| FC Roskilde | (Denmark) Martin Jungsgaard | (Denmark) Nicklas Halse | Puma | CP ApS |
| BK Fremad Amager | (Bosnia and Herzegovina) Azrudin Valentić | (Denmark) Mads Gabel | Adidas | — |
| HB Køge | (Lithuania) Aurelijus Skarbalius | (Denmark) Martin Vingaard | Capelli | Castus |
| Hvidovre IF | (Denmark) Per Frandsen | (Denmark) Christopher Østberg | Nike | KBS Byg |
| Kolding IF | (Denmark) Morten Mølkjær | (Denmark) Rune Nautrup | Hummel | Mos Mosh |
| Nykøbing FC | (Denmark) Claus Jensen | (Denmark) Lars Pleidrup | Nike | Jyske Bank |
| Næstved BK | (Denmark) Kenneth Gangsted | (Denmark) Joel Felix | Joma | Sydbank |
| Skive IK | (Denmark) Thomas Røll | (Denmark) Christoffer Østergaard | Nike | Spar Nord |
| Vejle BK | (Romania) Constantin Gâlcă | (Denmark) Jacob Schoop | Hummel | Arbejdernes Landsbank |
| Vendsyssel FF | (Denmark) Lasse Stensgaard | (Denmark) Søren Henriksen | Diadora | Spar Nord |
| Viborg FF | (Denmark) Jacob Neestrup | (Denmark) Jeppe Grønning | Nike | Andelskassen |

=== Managerial changes ===
| Team | Outgoing manager | Manner of departure | Date of vacancy | Replaced by | Date of appointment | Position in table |
|---|---|---|---|---|---|---|
| FC Roskilde | (Denmark) Christian Lønstrup | Resigned | 27 May 2019 | (Denmark) Christian Iversen | 26 June 2019 | Pre-Season |
| Nykøbing FC | (Denmark) Jens Olsen | Resigned | 30 May 2019 | (Denmark) Brian Rasmussen | 22 June 2019 | Pre-Season |
| Vendsyssel FF | (Denmark) Peter Enevoldsen | End of contract | 2 June 2019 | (Denmark) Johnny Mølby | 20 June 2019 | Pre-Season |
| Næstved BK | (Denmark) Michael Hemmingsen | Sacked | 3 June 2019 | (Denmark) Per V. Hansen Dos Santos | 3 July 2019 | Pre-Season |
| Viborg FF | (Denmark) Steffen Højer | Sacked | 3 June 2019 | (Denmark) Jacob Neestrup | 20 June 2019 | Pre-Season |
| Fremad Amager | (Bosnia and Herzegovina) Azrudin Valentić | Made First Team Coach | 1 July 2019 | (Sweden) Olof Mellberg | 1 July 2019 | Pre-Season |
| Næstved BK | (Denmark) Per V. Hansen Dos Santos | Sacked | 5 August 2019 | (Spain) Fernando De Argila | 7 August 2019 | 12th |
| BK Fremad Amager | (Sweden) Olof Mellberg | Signed by Helsingborgs IF | 3 September 2019 | (Bosnia and Herzegovina) Azrudin Valentić | 3 September 2019 | 7th |
| FC Roskilde | (Denmark) Christian Iversen | Resigned | 9 September 2019 | (Denmark) Martin Jungsgaard | 9 September 2019 | 12th |
| Kolding IF | (Denmark) Anders Jensen | Sacked | 11 November 2019 | (Denmark) Morten Mølkjær | 19 December 2019 | 4th |
| Næstved BK | (Spain) Fernando De Argila | Sacked | 18 November 2019 | (Germany) Maximilian Dentz | 1 January 2020 | 11th |
| HB Køge | (Denmark) Morten Karlsen | Mutual consent | 1 December 2019 | (Lithuania) Aurelijus Skarbalius | 1 January 2020 | 7th |
| Nykøbing FC | (Denmark) Brian Rasmussen | Made First Team Coach | 7 January 2020 | (Denmark) Claus Jensen | 7 January 2020 | 9th |
| Næstved BK | (Germany) Maximilian Dentz | Sacked | 22 June 2020 | (Denmark) Kenneth Gangsted | 22 June 2020 | 11th |
| Vendsyssel FF | (Denmark) Johnny Mølby | Sacked | 15 July 2020 | (Denmark) Lasse Stensgaard | 15 July 2020 | 6th |

== League table ==
| Pos | Team | Pld | W | D | L | GF | GA | GD | Pts | Promotion or Relegation |
|---|---|---|---|---|---|---|---|---|---|---|
| 1 | Vejle BK (C) | 33 | 20 | 8 | 5 | 63 | 31 | +32 | 68 | Promotion to Danish Superliga |
| 2 | Viborg FF | 33 | 17 | 8 | 8 | 66 | 44 | +22 | 59 | |
| 3 | FC Fredericia | 33 | 15 | 7 | 11 | 60 | 51 | +9 | 52 | |
| 4 | BK Fremad Amager | 33 | 13 | 10 | 10 | 45 | 45 | 0 | 49 | |
| 5 | Skive IK | 33 | 13 | 9 | 11 | 46 | 46 | 0 | 48 | |
| 6 | Kolding IF | 33 | 13 | 8 | 12 | 50 | 49 | +1 | 47 | |
| 7 | Vendsyssel FF | 33 | 12 | 8 | 13 | 35 | 39 | −4 | 44 | |
| 8 | Hvidovre IF | 33 | 10 | 11 | 12 | 46 | 46 | 0 | 41 | |
| 9 | HB Køge | 33 | 9 | 13 | 11 | 43 | 47 | −4 | 40 | |
| 10 | Nykøbing FC (R) | 33 | 7 | 12 | 14 | 46 | 63 | −17 | 33 | Relegation to Danish 2nd Divisions |
| 11 | FC Roskilde (R) | 33 | 8 | 7 | 18 | 43 | 58 | −15 | 31 | Relegation to Danish 2nd Divisions |
| 12 | Næstved BK (R) | 33 | 5 | 11 | 17 | 29 | 50 | −21 | 26 | Relegation to Danish 2nd Divisions |

Source: Danish FA
Rules for classification: 1) points; 2) goal difference; 3) number of goals scored
(C) Champions; (R) Relegated

== Results ==
=== First half of the season ===
| Home \ Away | FRE | ROS | AMA | HBK | HVI | KIF | NYK | NST | SKI | VEJ | VEN | VIB |
|---|---|---|---|---|---|---|---|---|---|---|---|---|
| FC Fredericia | — | 2–0 | 1–2 | 2–2 | 3–2 | 4–3 | 2–2 | 3–1 | 0–2 | 1–2 | 1–2 | 1–3 |
| FC Roskilde | 1–2 | — | 2–1 | 2–3 | 0–2 | 1–0 | 3–1 | 4–0 | 1–1 | 0–4 | 2–0 | 0–2 |
| BK Fremad Amager | 4–2 | 2–1 | — | 1–1 | 0–2 | 2–2 | 2–3 | 1–0 | 0–0 | 2–2 | 3–0 | 1–2 |
| HB Køge | 1–3 | 2–1 | 3–1 | — | 1–1 | 1–2 | 0–2 | 1–1 | 0–2 | 0–0 | 2–0 | 2–1 |
| Hvidovre IF | 2–3 | 3–2 | 0–0 | 2–2 | — | 1–2 | 1–0 | 3–1 | 4–2 | 0–1 | 1–1 | 0–1 |
| Kolding IF | 1–2 | 4–3 | 0–0 | 0–2 | 2–1 | — | 3–1 | 1–1 | 4–2 | 1–1 | 1–2 | 3–1 |
| Nykøbing FC | 0–5 | 2–2 | 2–2 | 3–1 | 2–2 | 3–2 | — | 0–1 | 4–2 | 0–0 | 0–3 | 1–2 |
| Næstved BK | 1–1 | 1–0 | 0–1 | 2–1 | 1–1 | 0–2 | 0–0 | — | 1–0 | 2–3 | 3–0 | 1–3 |
| Skive IK | 2–2 | 1–3 | 2–1 | 1–1 | 2–1 | 0–2 | 3–3 | 3–1 | — | 0–0 | 1–3 | 0–2 |
| Vejle BK | 0–1 | 2–0 | 4–0 | 1–0 | 3–0 | 3–0 | 2–4 | 1–1 | 2–1 | — | 1–0 | 4–1 |
| Vendsyssel FF | 0–1 | 2–0 | 0–1 | 2–1 | 1–0 | 2–0 | 0–0 | 1–1 | 0–1 | 0–3 | — | 1–0 |
| Viborg FF | 2–2 | 3–0 | 5–0 | 0–0 | 1–1 | 1–2 | 3–0 | 2–1 | 1–1 | 3–4 | 1–1 | — |

Legend: Blue = home team win; Yellow = draw; Red = away team win.

=== Second half of the season ===
| Home \ Away | FRE | ROS | AMA | HBK | HVI | KIF | NYK | NST | SKI | VEJ | VEN | VIB |
|---|---|---|---|---|---|---|---|---|---|---|---|---|
| FC Fredericia | — | — | 3–1 | — | 1–2 | 2–0 | 2–2 | 3–2 | — | — | 2–4 | — |
| FC Roskilde | 1–0 | — | — | 2–2 | — | — | 2–2 | — | 2–2 | — | 1–3 | — |
| BK Fremad Amager | — | 2–0 | — | — | — | — | 4–0 | 1–0 | 0–0 | 4–1 | — | 2–2 |
| HB Køge | 2–2 | — | 0–1 | — | — | 1–0 | — | 2–2 | — | 2–1 | — | — |
| Hvidovre IF | — | 0–0 | 3–0 | 1–1 | — | — | — | — | 0–2 | — | — | 1–4 |
| Kolding IF | — | 2–2 | 2–2 | — | 0–2 | — | — | — | 2–1 | 0–1 | — | — |
| Nykøbing FC | — | — | — | 0–1 | 1–1 | 2–2 | — | 2–1 | — | — | 0–2 | — |
| Næstved BK | — | 0–2 | — | — | 0–2 | 0–1 | — | — | — | 1–1 | 0–0 | 2–2 |
| Skive IK | 1–0 | — | — | 3–2 | — | — | 3–2 | 2–0 | — | — | — | 0–1 |
| Vejle BK | 2–0 | 4–1 | — | — | 5–3 | — | 1–0 | — | 1–2 | — | — | 1–1 |
| Vendsyssel FF | — | — | 0–1 | 1–1 | 1–1 | 2–2 | — | — | 0–1 | 0–2 | — | — |
| Viborg FF | 0–2 | 4–2 | — | 4–2 | — | 0–2 | 4–3 | — | — | — | 4–1 | — |

Legend: Blue = home team win; Yellow = draw; Red = away team win.
