= 2017–18 Danish 1st Division =

78th season of Danish 1st Division

NordicBet Liga
- Season: 2017–18
- Champions: Vejle; 7th Danish 1st Division title 3rd title at second-tier level
- Promoted: Vejle, Esbjerg fB, Vendsyssel
- Relegated: Brabrand, Skive
- Matches: 198
- Goals: 546 (2.76 per match)
- Top goalscorer: Anders Dreyer (Esbjerg fB) (18 goals)
- Biggest home win: Fredericia 5–1; Brabrand (24 September 2017)
- Biggest away win: Fremad Amager 0–6; Viborg (20 August 2017)
- Highest scoring: Skive 4–4; Nykøbing (26 November 2017)
- Longest winning run: Vejle (6 matches)
- Longest unbeaten run: Fredericia (9 matches)
- Longest winless run: Thisted (14 matches)
- Longest losing run: Brabrand; Thisted (6 matches each)
- Highest attendance: 10,192; Vejle 1–0; Fredericia (16 May 2018)
- Lowest attendance: 188; Brabrand 1–3; HB Køge (10 September 2017)
- Average attendance: 1,245

The 2017–18 Danish 1st Division (known as the NordicBet Liga due to sponsorship by NordicBet) marked the 22nd season of the league operating as the second tier of Danish football and the 78th season overall under the 1st Division name. The league is governed by the Danish Football Association (DBU).

The division-champion, the runners-up and the third placed team are promoted to the 2018–19 Danish Superliga. The teams in 11th and 12th places are relegated to the 2018–19 Danish 2nd Divisions.

== Participants ==
Esbjerg fB finished last in the 2016–17 Danish Superliga relegation play-off and were relegated to the 1st Division for the first time since the 2010-11 season. Viborg FF lost to FC Helsingør in the relegation play off and were relegated after two seasons in the first tier as well. Hobro IK and FC Helsingør were promoted to the 2017–18 Danish Superliga.

AB and Næstved Boldklub were relegated to the 2017–18 Danish 2nd Divisions. AB were relegated immediately after just one season at the second tier while Næstved Boldklub lasted two seasons in the league. Thisted FC and Brabrand IF won promotion from the 2016–17 Danish 2nd Divisions. Thisted and Brabrand will play at the 1st Division for the first time since the 2009-10 season.

=== Stadia and locations ===
Locations of the 2017–18 Danish 1st Division teams.

Club	Location	Stadium	Turf	Capacity	2016–17 position
Brabrand IF	Brabrand	Brabrand Stadion	Natural	1,000	2D, 2nd
Esbjerg fB	Esbjerg	Blue Water Arena	Natural	18,000	Superliga, 14th
FC Fredericia	Fredericia	Monjasa Park	Natural	4,000	8th
FC Roskilde	Roskilde	Roskilde Idrætspark	Natural	6,000	4th
Fremad Amager	Copenhagen	Sundby Idrætspark^{‡}	Natural	7,200	10th
HB Køge	Herfølge/Køge	Castus Park (until 28 February 2018); Capelli Sport Stadion (since 1 March 2018)	Natural	8,000	6th
Nykøbing FC	Nykøbing Falster	Nykøbing Falster Idrætspark (until 5 March 2018); CM Arena (since 6 March 2018)	Natural	10,000	7th
Skive IK	Skive	Spar Nord Arena	Natural	10,000	5th
Thisted FC	Thisted	Sparekassen Thy Arena	Natural	3,000	2D, 1st
Vejle BK	Vejle	Vejle Stadion	Natural	10,418	9th
Vendsyssel FF	Hjørring	Nord Energi Arena	Natural	7,500	2nd
Viborg FF	Viborg	Energi Viborg Arena	Natural	9,566	Superliga, 12th

^{‡}: Due to the weather conditions (frost), two spring home matches on 4 and 18 March at were moved to Gentofte Sportspark.

=== Personnel and sponsoring ===
Note: Flags indicate national team as has been defined under FIFA eligibility rules. Players and Managers may hold more than one non-FIFA nationality.

Team	Head coach	Captain	Kit manufacturer	Shirt sponsor
Brabrand IF	(Denmark) Tom Søjberg	(Denmark) Jesper Brinck	Hummel	Hummel
FC Fredericia	(Denmark) Jesper Sørensen	(Denmark) Christian Ege Nielsen	Hummel	Monjasa
Esbjerg fB	(Netherlands) John Lammers	(Denmark) Nikolaj Hagelskjær	Nike	Stofa
FC Roskilde	(Denmark) Rasmus Monnerup	(Denmark) Stefan Hansen	Nike	CP ApS
Fremad Amager	(Denmark) John Jensen	(Denmark) Mohammed Abdalas	Adidas	HC Container
HB Køge	(Denmark) Henrik Lehm	(Denmark) Henrik Madsen	Nike	Castus
Nykøbing FC	(Denmark) Jens Olsen	(Denmark) Lars Pleidrup	Nike	Jyske Bank
Skive IK	(Denmark) Anders Gerber	(Denmark) John Dyring	Nike	Spar Nord
Thisted FC	(Denmark) Henning Pedersen (caretaker)	(Denmark) Allan Høvenhoff	Puma	Sparekassen Thy
Vejle BK	(Italy) Adolfo Sormani	(Denmark) Jacob Schoop	Hummel	Frøs Herreds Sparekasse
Vendsyssel FF	(Denmark) Jens Berthel Askou	(Denmark) Rune Frantsen	Puma	Spar Nord
Viborg FF	(Denmark) Steffen Højer	(Denmark) Mikkel Rask	Nike	Andelskassen

=== Managerial changes ===
Team	Outgoing manager	Manner of departure	Date of vacancy	Replaced by	Date of appointment	Position in table
Esbjerg fB	(Denmark) Lars Lungi Sørensen	Sacked	19 June 2017	(Netherlands) John Lammers	23 June 2017	Pre-Season
Thisted FC	(Denmark) Bo Zinck	Resigned	30 June 2017	(Sweden) Joakim Mattsson	1 July 2017	Pre-Season
Vejle BK	(Sweden) Andreas Alm	Mutual consent	30 June 2017	(Italy) Adolfo Sormani	1 July 2017	Pre-Season
FC Roskilde	(Denmark) Anders Theil	Promoted to Director of Sport	30 June 2017	(Denmark) René Skovdahl	1 July 2017	Pre-Season
Viborg FF	(Denmark) Johnny Mølby	Sacked	2 August 2017	(Denmark) Steffen Højer	2 August 2017	10th
FC Roskilde	(Denmark) René Skovdahl	Mutual consent	18 September 2017	(Denmark) Rasmus Monnerup	28 September 2017	10th
Skive IK	(Denmark) Kim Kristensen	Sacked	17 October 2017	(Denmark) Anders Gerber	25 October 2017	12th
Thisted FC	(Sweden) Joakim Mattsson	Sacked	8 May 2018	(Denmark) Henning Pedersen (caretaker)	8 May 2018	7th
Vendsyssel FF	(Denmark) Erik Rasmussen	Resigned	8 May 2018	(Denmark) Jens Berthel Askou	8 May 2018	4th

== League table ==
Pos	Team	Pld	W	D	L	GF	GA	GD	Pts	Promotion or Relegation
1	Vejle BK (P, C)	33	18	11	4	47	24	+23	65	Promotion to Danish Superliga
2	Esbjerg fB (P)	33	18	6	9	61	36	+25	60	Qualification to Promotion play-offs
3	Vendsyssel FF (P)	33	15	11	7	59	42	+17	56	Qualification to Promotion play-offs
4	Viborg FF	33	15	9	9	58	42	+16	54	
5	HB Køge	33	14	10	9	42	31	+11	52	
6	FC Fredericia	33	11	9	13	48	47	+1	42	
7	Nykøbing FC	33	10	10	13	54	59	−5	40	
8	Thisted FC	33	10	10	13	42	53	−11	40	
9	Fremad Amager	33	11	7	15	27	42	−15	40	
10	FC Roskilde	33	10	8	15	41	49	−8	38	
11	Brabrand IF (R)	33	8	10	15	34	61	−27	34	Relegation to Danish 2nd Divisions
12	Skive IK (R)	33	3	9	21	33	60	−27	18	Relegation to Danish 2nd Divisions

Source: Danish FA
Rules for classification: 1) points; 2) goal difference; 3) number of goals scored
(C) Champions; (P) Promoted; (R) Relegated
