= 2020–21 Danish 1st Division =

81st season of Danish 1st Division

NordicBet Liga
- Season: 2020–21
- Champions: Viborg; 6th Danish 1st Division title 7th 2nd tier title
- Promoted: Viborg; Silkeborg
- Relegated: Kolding; Skive
- Matches played: 192
- Goals scored: 527 (2.74 per match)
- Top goalscorer: Sebastian Grønning (Viborg) (23 goals)
- Biggest home win: Fremad Amager 6–0; Vendsyssel (12 September 2020)
- Biggest away win: HB Køge 0–5; Helsingør (11 May 2021)
- Highest scoring: Hobro 3–4; Hvidovre (29 November 2020)
- Highest attendance: 3,306; Viborg 3–3; Silkeborg (6 August 2023)
- Lowest attendance: 216; Vendsyssel 1–2; Esbjerg fB (9 December 2020)
- Average attendance: 436

The 2020–21 Danish 1st Division (known as the NordicBet Liga due to sponsorship by NordicBet) marked the 25th season of the league operating as the second tier of Danish football and the 81st season overall under the 1st Division name. The league is governed by the Danish Football Association (DBU).

From this season a promotion round for the six best placed teams and a relegation round for the six lowest placed teams are introduced. The top two teams of the promotion round are promoted to the 2021–22 Danish Superliga. The teams in 11th and 12th places are relegated to the 2021–22 Danish 2nd Division.

== Participants ==
Silkeborg IF, and Esbjerg fB finished last in the 2019–20 Danish Superliga relegation play-off and were relegated to the 1st Division. Hobro IK lost to Lyngby Boldklub in the relegation play off and was relegated as well. Vejle Boldklub was promoted to the 2020–21 Danish Superliga.

Nykøbing FC, FC Roskilde and Næstved BK were relegated to the 2020–21 Danish 2nd Divisions. Nykøbing FC was relegated after four seasons in the league, FC Roskilde after six seasons, and Næstved BK after two seasons. FC Helsingør won promotion from the 2019–20 Danish 2nd Divisions. They won promotion after only one season's absence.

=== Stadia and locations ===
Locations of the 2020–21 Danish 1st Division teams.

Club	Location	Stadium	Turf	Capacity	2019–20 position
Esbjerg fB	Esbjerg	Blue Water Arena	Natural	18,000	Superliga, 14th
FC Fredericia	Fredericia	Monjasa Park	Natural	4,000	3rd
FC Helsingør	Helsingør	Helsingør Stadion	Natural	4,500	2D, 1st
BK Fremad Amager	Copenhagen	Sundby Idrætspark	Artificial	7,200	4th
HB Køge	Herfølge/Køge	Capelli Sport Stadion	Artificial	4,000	9th
Hobro IK	Hobro	DS Arena	Natural	10,700	Superliga, 12th
Hvidovre IF	Hvidovre	Hvidovre Stadion; Capelli Sport Stadion	Natural; Artificial	12,000; 4,000	8th
Kolding IF	Kolding	Autocentralen Park	Natural	10,000	6th
Silkeborg IF	Silkeborg	JYSK Park	Artificial	10,000	Superliga, 13th
Skive IK	Skive	SPAR Nord Arena	Natural	10,000	5th
Vendsyssel FF	Hjørring	Hjørring Stadion	Natural	7,500	7th
Viborg FF	Viborg	Energi Viborg Arena	Natural	9,566	2nd

=== Personnel and sponsoring ===
Note: Flags indicate national team as has been defined under FIFA eligibility rules. Players and Managers may hold more than one non-FIFA nationality.

Team	Head coach	Captain	Kit manufacturer	Shirt sponsor
Esbjerg fB	(Denmark) Lars Vind (caretaker)	(Jamaica) Rodolph Austin	Nike	Viking
FC Fredericia	(Denmark) Michael Hansen	(Denmark) Christian Ege Nielsen	Hummel	Monjasa
FC Helsingør	(Denmark) Morten Eskesen	(Denmark) Nikolaj Hansen	Diadora	C Rail Safety
BK Fremad Amager	(Denmark) Jesper Christiansen (caretaker)	(Denmark) Pierre Dahlin Larsen	Adidas	Øens Erhvervsnetværk
HB Køge	(Lithuania) Aurelijus Skarbalius	(Guinea-Bissau) Eddi Gomes	Capelli	Castus
Hobro IK	(Denmark) Michael Kryger	(Denmark) Jonas Damborg	Puma	DS Gruppen, Spar Nord
Hvidovre IF	(Denmark) Per Frandsen	(Denmark) Christopher Østberg	Nike	KBS Byg
Kolding IF	(Denmark) Kristoffer Wichmann	(Denmark) Rune Nautrup	Hummel	Mos Mosh
Silkeborg IF	(Denmark) Kent Nielsen	(Denmark) Svenn Crone	Uhlsport	Mascot International
Skive IK	(Denmark) Martin Thomsen	(Denmark) Christoffer Østergaard	Nike	Spar Nord
Vendsyssel FF	(Denmark) Michael Schjønberg	(Denmark) Søren Henriksen	Diadora	Nordjyske Bank
Viborg FF	(Denmark) Lars Friis	(Denmark) Jeppe Grønning	Nike	Andelskassen

=== Managerial changes ===
Team	Outgoing manager	Manner of departure	Date of vacancy	Replaced by	Position in table	Date of appointment
Skive IK	(Denmark) Thomas Røll	End of contract	31 July 2020	(Denmark) Martin Thomsen	Pre-Season	1 August 2020
Esbjerg fB	(Denmark) Troels Bech	End of contract	31 July 2020	(Iceland) Ólafur Kristjánsson	Pre-Season	1 August 2020
FC Fredericia	(Denmark) Jonas Dal	Signed by AC Horsens	24 August 2020	(Denmark) Michael Hansen	Pre-Season	30 August 2020
Vendsyssel FF	(Denmark) Lasse Stensgaard	Sacked	14 December 2020	(Denmark) Michael Schjønberg	11th	16 December 2020
Viborg FF	(Denmark) Jacob Neestrup	Signed by F.C. Copenhagen	22 December 2020	(Denmark) Lars Friis	1st	16 January 2021
BK Fremad Amager	(Bosnia and Herzegovina) Azrudin Valentić	Signed by Botev Plovdiv	7 January 2021	(Sweden) Joakim Mattsson	5th	15 January 2021
Hobro IK	(Denmark) Peter Sørensen	Resigned	26 February 2021	(Denmark) Michael Kryger	8th	26 February 2021
Kolding IF	(Denmark) Morten Mølkjær	Sacked	27 February 2021	(Denmark) Kristoffer Wichmann	11th	28 February 2021
Esbjerg fB	(Iceland) Ólafur Kristjánsson	Sacked	10 May 2021	(Denmark) Lars Vind (caretaker)	3rd	10 May 2021
BK Fremad Amager	(Sweden) Joakim Mattsson	Sacked	17 May 2021	(Denmark) Jesper Christiansen (caretaker)	7th	17 May 2021

== Regular season ==
=== League table ===
Pos	Team	Pld	W	D	L	GF	GA	GD	Pts	Promotion or Relegation
1	Viborg FF	22	17	5	0	45	14	+31	56	Qualification to Promotion Group
2	Silkeborg IF	22	16	1	5	53	19	+34	49	Qualification to Promotion Group
3	Esbjerg fB	22	15	3	4	33	20	+13	48	Qualification to Promotion Group
4	FC Helsingør	22	11	3	8	31	27	+4	36	Qualification to Promotion Group
5	FC Fredericia	22	9	5	8	29	27	+2	32	Qualification to Promotion Group
6	HB Køge	22	8	6	8	23	25	−2	30	Qualification to Promotion Group
7	Fremad Amager	22	8	4	10	40	29	+11	28	Qualification to Relegation Group
8	Hobro IK	22	6	6	10	30	40	−10	24	Qualification to Relegation Group
9	Hvidovre IF	22	7	2	13	23	38	−15	23	Qualification to Relegation Group
10	Vendsyssel FF	22	4	4	14	19	40	−21	16	Qualification to Relegation Group
11	Kolding IF	22	2	8	12	19	40	−21	14	Qualification to Relegation Group
12	Skive IK	22	3	5	14	19	45	−26	14	Qualification to Relegation Group

Updated to match(es) played on 19 March 2021. Source: Danish FA
Rules for classification: 1) points; 2) goal difference; 3) number of goals scored

== Results ==
=== Regular season ===
Home \ Away	ESB	FRE	AMA	HEL	HOB	HVI	HBK	KIF	SIL	SKI	VEN	VIB
Esbjerg fB	—	3–1	2–0	2–1	1–0	0–2	1–0	2–0	1–2	2–1	0–0	2–2
FC Fredericia	0–1	—	3–1	1–2	1–1	0–1	1–1	2–1	1–0	2–1	1–1	1–1
Fremad Amager	2–3	1–2	—	5–1	2–2	4–0	0–1	0–0	0–3	4–0	6–0	1–1
FC Helsingør	1–2	1–0	2–1	—	0–1	2–0	0–2	0–0	4–2	2–1	3–0	0–1
Hobro IK	1–2	3–2	0–4	0–1	—	3–4	3–1	1–1	0–3	2–1	3–1	1–1
Hvidovre IF	0–1	0–3	1–2	0–3	1–2	—	0–0	2–0	1–5	1–2	2–0	1–2
HB Køge	0–2	0–1	0–3	2–1	1–1	2–1	—	1–1	0–1	0–0	3–0	0–3
Kolding IF	1–1	1–2	1–1	0–2	2–1	1–1	2–4	—	0–4	2–4	3–2	0–1
Silkeborg IF	3–1	2–0	2–0	3–3	4–2	2–0	2–0	3–0	—	2–0	4–1	1–2
Skive IK	0–2	0–4	0–2	0–0	2–2	2–3	1–3	1–1	0–4	—	1–1	0–3
Vendsyssel FF	1–2	1–1	2–0	1–2	3–0	1–2	0–1	1–0	2–1	0–1	—	0–1
Viborg FF	2–0	4–0	3–1	3–0	2–1	1–0	1–1	4–2	1–0	3–1	3–1	—

Source: danskfodbold.com
Legend: Blue = home team win; Yellow = draw; Red = away team win.

== Promotion Group ==
Points and goals carry over in full from the regular season.

Pos	Team	Pld	W	D	L	GF	GA	GD	Pts	Promotion or relegation	VIB	SIL	ESB	HEL	FRE	HBK
1	Viborg FF (P)	32	23	7	2	71	24	+47	76	Promotion to 2021–22 Danish Superliga	—	3–3	4–0	0–3	4–1	4–0
2	Silkeborg IF (P)	32	23	4	5	76	28	+48	73	Promotion to 2021–22 Danish Superliga	2–0	—	2–0	2–0	2–1	4–1
3	Esbjerg fB	32	18	5	9	43	38	+5	59		0–4	1–1	—	2–2	1–2	1–0
4	FC Helsingør	32	16	5	11	50	41	+9	53		0–3	3–3	1–0	—	2–1	3–1
5	FC Fredericia	32	13	5	14	42	44	−2	44		0–3	0–1	1–3	2–0	—	3–0
6	HB Køge	32	8	7	17	28	53	−25	31		1–1	0–3	1–2	0–5	1–2	—

Updated to match(es) played on 26 May 2021. Source: Danish FA
Rules for classification: 1) points; 2) goal difference; 3) number of goals scored
(P) Promoted

== Relegation Group ==
Points and goals carry over in full from the regular season.

Pos	Team	Pld	W	D	L	GF	GA	GD	Pts	Promotion or relegation	HVI	AMA	HOB	VEN	KIF	SKI
1	Hvidovre IF	32	11	6	15	40	47	−7	39		—	3–0	4–0	2–2	0–2	3–0
2	Fremad Amager	32	10	5	17	47	41	+6	35		0–1	—	0–0	3–0	0–1	2–0
3	Hobro IK	32	8	10	14	38	51	−13	34		1–1	2–0	—	0–2	1–2	3–0
4	Vendsyssel FF	32	8	8	16	33	51	−18	32		1–0	2–1	1–1	—	3–0	1–1
5	Kolding IF (R)	32	7	11	14	31	49	−18	32	Relegation to 2021–22 Danish 2nd Division	1–1	2–1	0–0	1–1	—	2–0
6	Skive IK (R)	32	7	7	18	28	60	−32	28	Relegation to 2021–22 Danish 2nd Division	2–2	1–0	1–0	2–1	2–1	—

Updated to match(es) played on 23 May 2021. Source: Danish FA
Rules for classification: 1) points; 2) goal difference; 3) number of goals scored
(R) Relegated

== Season statistics ==
=== Top goalscorers ===
As of 27 May 2021.

Rank	Player	Club	Goals
1	(Denmark) Sebastian Grønning	Viborg FF	23
2	(Denmark) Magnus Mattsson	Silkeborg IF	19
3	(Denmark) Jakob Bonde	Viborg FF	12
4	(Denmark) Kristoffer Munksgaard	Fremad Amager	11
4	(Denmark) Mads Dittmer Hvilsom	Hobro IK	11
6	(Denmark) Christian Tue Jensen	FC Fredericia	10
6	(Denmark) Oliver Drost	Kolding IF	10
6	(Denmark) Nicklas Helenius	Silkeborg IF	10
9	(Denmark) Jeppe Kjær	FC Helsingør	9
