= Jakob Bonde =

Danish footballer (born 1993)

Personal information
- Full name: Jakob Bonde Havlykke Jensen
- Date of birth: 29 December 1993 (age 32)
- Place of birth: Nykøbing Falster, Denmark
- Height: 1.86 m (6 ft 1 in)
- Position: Midfielder

Team information
- Current team: AC Horsens
- Number: 6

Senior career*
Years	Team	Apps	(Gls)
2013–2018	Nykøbing FC	66	(9)
2018–2024	Viborg FF	160	(36)
2024–2026	OB	26	(6)
2026–	AC Horsens	0	(0)
- * Club domestic league appearances and goals as of 2 September 2026

Jakob Bonde Havlykke Jensen (born 29 December 1993) is a professional Danish footballer who plays as a midfielder for AC Horsens in the Danish Superliga. He has also played for the Denmark national futsal team, making 25 appearances between 2012 and 2015.

== Club career ==
Born in Nykøbing Falster, he played for his hometown club of Nykøbing FC in the Danish 1st Division. During the summer of 2016, he spent time in Italy playing professional futsal for Virtus Noicattaro.

On transfer deadline day in 2018, Bonde signed for Viborg FF. He made 135 appearances for the club in both the Danish 1st Division and the Danish Superliga between 2018 and 2024, scoring 34 goals. He scored 13 goals in 25 appearances during the club's 2020–21 season, in which they won the 1st Division and returned to the Superliga after four seasons. During his time at the club, he made his first career continental appearance in the 2022–23 UEFA Europa Conference League.

In the summer of 2024, he moved to his current club of Odense Boldklub, as the club returned to the Danish 1st Division for their 2024–25 season. His move to OB involved an exchange, as Charly Nouck Horneman moved to Viborg.

== Career statistics ==
As of match played 2 March 2025

Appearances and goals by club, season and competition
Club	Season	League			National cup (Note: Appearances in the Danish Cup)		Continental		Total	
Club	Season	Division	Apps	Goals	Apps	Goals	Apps	Goals	Apps	Goals
Nykøbing FC	2016–17	1st Division	29	4	0	0	—		29	4
Nykøbing FC	2017–18	1st Division	31	4	0	0	—		31	4
Nykøbing FC	2018–19	1st Division	6	1	0	0	—		6	1
Nykøbing FC	Total		66	9	0	0	0	0	66	9
Viborg	2018–19	1st Division	15	3	0	0	—		15	3
Viborg	2019–20	1st Division	31	10	0	0	—		31	10
Viborg	2020–21	1st Division	25	12	1	1	—		25	13
Viborg	2021–22	Superliga	32	6	1	0	—		33	6
Viborg	2022–23	Superliga	32	3	5	0	6 (Note: Appearances in 2022–23 UEFA Europa Conference League)	2	43	5
Viborg	2023–24	Superliga	25	2	2	1	—		27	3
Viborg	Total		160	36	9	2	6	2	175	40
OB	2024–25	1st Division	17	5	1	0	—		18	5
Career Total			243	50	10	2	6	2	259	54

=== International ===
Appearances and goals by national team and year
National team	Year	Apps	Goals
Denmark (futsal)	2012	4	2
Denmark (futsal)	2013	9	9
Denmark (futsal)	2015	12	7
Career Total		25	18

== Honours ==
Viborg FF

- Danish 1st Division: 2020–21

OB

- Danish 1st Division: 2024–25
