= Anders Due =

Danish footballer (born 1982)

Personal information
- Full name: Anders Due Hansen
- Date of birth: 17 March 1982 (age 44)
- Place of birth: Nykøbing Falster, Denmark
- Height: 1.77 m (5 ft 9 1/2 in)
- Position: Winger

Team information
- Current team: Nykøbing (Head of Talent)

Youth career
- Stubbekøbing Boldklub

Senior career*
Years	Team	Apps	(Gls)
2002–2005	NFA	85	(22)
2005–2006	Nordsjælland	31	(4)
2006–2007	Vitesse Arnhem	19	(1)
2008–2014	AaB	151	(10)
2010	→ Nordsjælland (loan)	10	(1)
2014–2016	Vestsjælland	38	(5)
2016–2018	Nykøbing	51	(3)

International career
2006	Denmark League XI	3	(1)

Managerial career
- 2019: Nykøbing (assistant)
- * Club domestic league appearances and goals

Anders Due Hansen (Danish pronunciation: [ˈɑnɐs ˈduːə]; born 17 March 1982) is a Danish retired footballer and current Head of Talent in Nykøbing FC.

He played as a left midfielder and is the cousin of Danish national team and former Bolton, Charlton and Fulham midfielder, Claus Jensen.

== Club career ==
Born in Nykøbing Falster, Due started playing football at Stubbekøbing Boldklub, but like many promising youngsters from Lolland and Falster switched to Nykøbing Falster Alliancen.

=== Nykøbing Falster Alliancen ===
Due started playing for Nykøbing Falster Alliancen (NFA) as a child, having almost his entire football upbringing at the club. Initially used as a left back, he later switched to the left midfield where his brilliant left foot helped crossing to the strikers. He started his professional career at the club in 2002, playing in the lower divisions of Danish football. He helped the club win several promotions up through the Danish football hierarchy. In 2004 Due signed a contract extension to 2006 along with fellow NFA youngster Anton Smedegaard.

During the 2004–05 season, Due scored 10 goals, 8 of which were from direct free kicks. As his contract with NFA was running out and with many good displays in the first division, Due had attracted the attention of clubs from the Danish Superliga, especially AGF, Brøndby IF and FC Nordsjælland. In the end he chose FC Nordsjælland, a club with an excellent record of picking good players from first division and turning them into quality players.

=== FC Nordsjælland ===
After arriving Due quickly replaced the injury plagued Henrik Eggerts as the first choice on the left midfield at FC Nordsjælland. Due had an astonishing beginning in FC Nordsjælland making 12 assists and scoring twice. Because of this Due was selected for the Danish Superliga Team of the fall 2006. The remaining part of the season was not as successful, but Due still managed to lead the most assist table by the end of the season, with a total of 15 assists.

=== Vitesse ===
After only one season at FC Nordsjælland, Due was headhunted by Vitesse Arnhem, who previously signed his teammate, Mads Junker. Vitesse, while scouting Junker, had noticed that Due was making most of the assists and decided to pay the 10 million DKK, approx 1.34 million Euro, price tag. Despite initial statements from the FC Nordsjælland owner, Allan K. Pedersen, denying the transfer, Due officially signed a four-year contract with Vitesse on 5 July 2006.

Due success during the first season in Vitesse was limited though, making only 17 appearances out of which only 7 were full matches. During the end of the 2006–07 season, Due told the media that he would most likely be leaving the Vitesse during the summer transfer window, citing Brøndby IF as the most likely destination. Having played in only 17 matches, he was unhappy with the lack of first team football. However, after talks with the manager, he announced that he would stay as the manager had explained that the club saw him as a great player for the future season.

=== FC Vestsjælland ===
On 10 June 2014, Due signed a three-year contract with FC Vestsjælland, at the age of 32. After the signing, FCVs sports director pronounced that he was hoping that Anders Due, could be a culture bearer for the club.

=== Nykøbing FC ===
On 11 January 2016, it was confirmed, that Due had signed with his former club Nykøbing FC.

== International career ==
In his first season in the Superliga, Due established himself as one of the best wingers of the league. In January 2006, he was a part of national team manager Morten Olsen's Danish league national team, a representation team under the Danish FA consisting of players from the domestic Superliga. He played three unofficial international matches for the league national team at the 2006 Lunar New Year Cup, and scored a goal in the 3–0 victory against Hong Kong.

Because of his good displays during the USA trip, he was called up for the friendly against Paraguay on 27 May 2006 and France on 31 May 2006 as a replacement for Peter Løvenkrands. Due remained on the bench in both games as an unused substitute.

== Coaching career ==
After retiring at the end of the 2017/18 season, Due continued at Nykøbing FC as an individual coach. In the following season, he was promoted to assistant manager of the newly appointed manager Brian Rasmussen. From the turn of the year 2020, Due was again moved to Nykøbing as an individual coach.

In the following years, Due had several different roles: He worked at Nykøbing's academy, among other roles, he was coaching the clubs U-15 team together with Lars Pleidrup, and later also as a coach at Halstedhus Efterskole; a school, connected to the football team Halstedshus IF.

In June 2024, Due became talentchef in Nykøbing FC.
