= Tranberg =

Tranberg is a surname. Notable people with the surname include:

- Haakon Tranberg (1917–1991), Norwegian sprinter
- Lene Tranberg (born 1956), Danish architect
- Robert Tranberg (born 1969), Swedish footballer
- Robin Tranberg (born 1993), Swedish footballer
- Viktor Tranberg (born 1997), Danish footballer
