= Viktor Tranberg =

Danish footballer (born 1997)

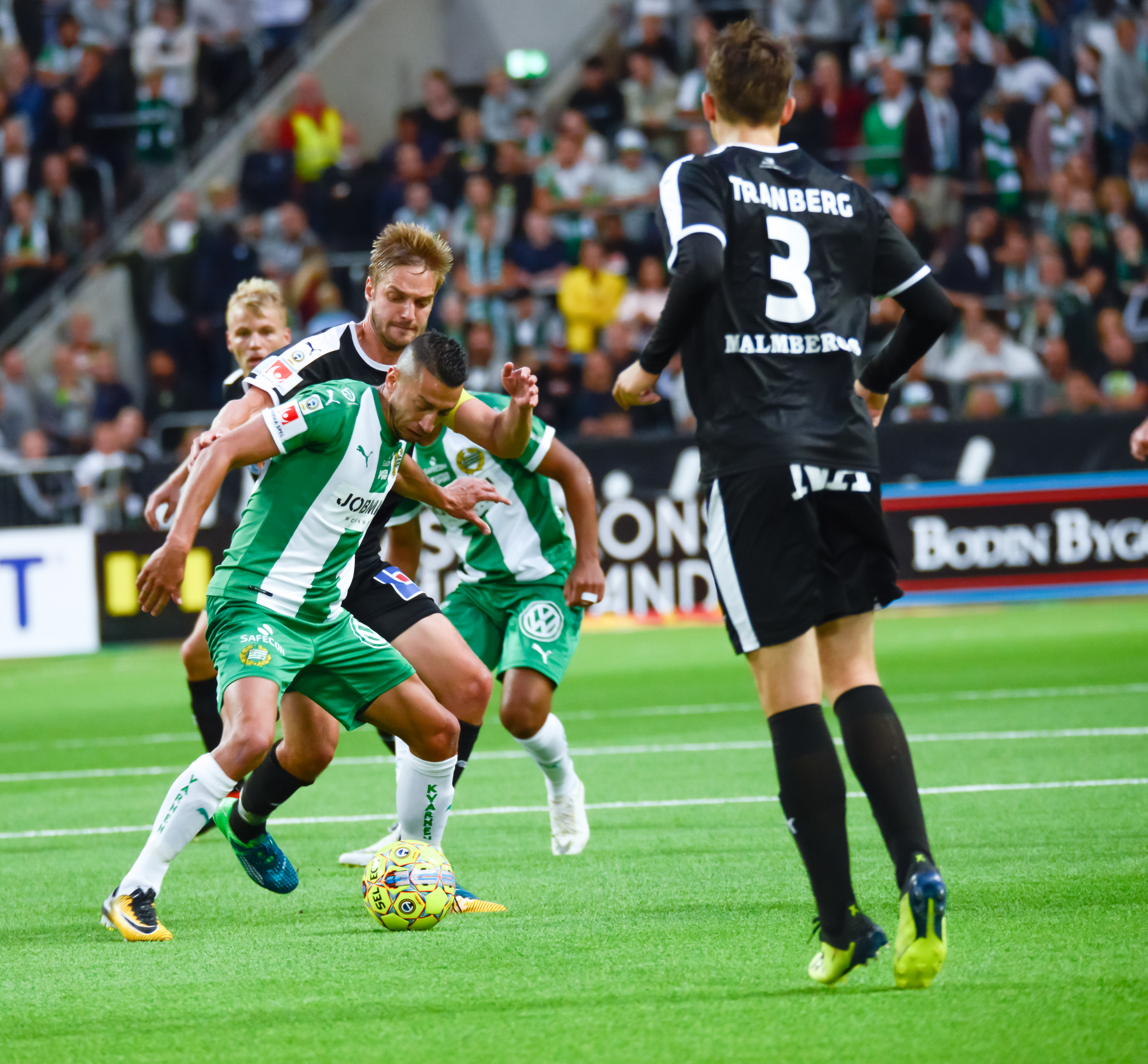
- Tranberg in 2018

Personal information
- Date of birth: 26 February 1997 (age 29)
- Place of birth: Copenhagen, Denmark
- Height: 1.90 m (6 ft 3 in)
- Position: Centre-back

Youth career
- 2003–2010: Union
- 2010–2012: Brøndby
- 2012–2013: Lyngby
- 2013–2016: Nordsjælland

Senior career*
Years	Team	Apps	(Gls)
2016–2019	Nordsjælland	33	(0)
2018	→ Örebro (loan)	13	(0)
2019–2022	Esbjerg	47	(0)
Total		93	(0)

International career
2015	Denmark U18	2	(0)
2015	Denmark U19	1	(0)
2017	Denmark U21	1	(0)
- * Club domestic league appearances and goals

Viktor Tranberg (born 26 February 1997) is a Danish former professional footballer who played as a centre-back.

== Club career ==
=== Nordsjælland ===
Tranberg was born in Copenhagen, Denmark. He was promoted into the first team squad in the summer 2016 at the age of 19. He made his Nordsjælland debut on 7 August 2016, coming off the bench in the 62nd minute for Abdul Mumin in a 2–1 defeat against AaB in the Danish Superliga.

Tranberg became a regular starter in the 2017–18 season, but was benched in October 2017.

==== Loan to Örebro SK ====
On 7 August 2018, Örebro SK announced the signing of Tranberg on a loan deal for the rest of the year. He returned to Nordsjælland after making 13 appearances. In December, Tranberg announced, that he would like to continue at the club, but it was up to the clubs to make an agreement.

=== Esbjerg fB ===
On 16 July 2019, it was confirmed that Tranberg had joined Esbjerg fB on a four-year contract. In the first half of the season, Tranberg played only four games for the club, a total of 24 minutes in the league and 180 minutes in the UEFA Europa League qualifiers. At the end of the season, Esbjerg suffered relegation to the second-tier 1st Division.

Following relegation, Tranberg began playing more regularly, making 22 appearances for the club during the 2020–21 season.

On 22 November 2022, 25-year old Tranberg confirmed that he had been forced to retire with immediate effect due to an injury.

== International career ==
Tranberg made his debut for the Denmark under-18s on 7 April 2015, coming on as a substitute for Nicklas Halse in a 2–1 friendly loss to Romania at Stadionul Dan Păltinișanu in Timișoara. He made his first and only appearance at under-19 level in October 2015, coincidentally also against Romania, playing in a 4–1 friendly win.

On 14 November 2017, Tranberg made his debut for the under-21 team in a 3–1 loss in the 2019 UEFA European Under-21 Championship qualifier to Poland U21, coming off the bench for Asger Sørensen in the 52nd minute. This would be his final appearances for the Denmark national youth teams.
