= Væggerløse =

- Town
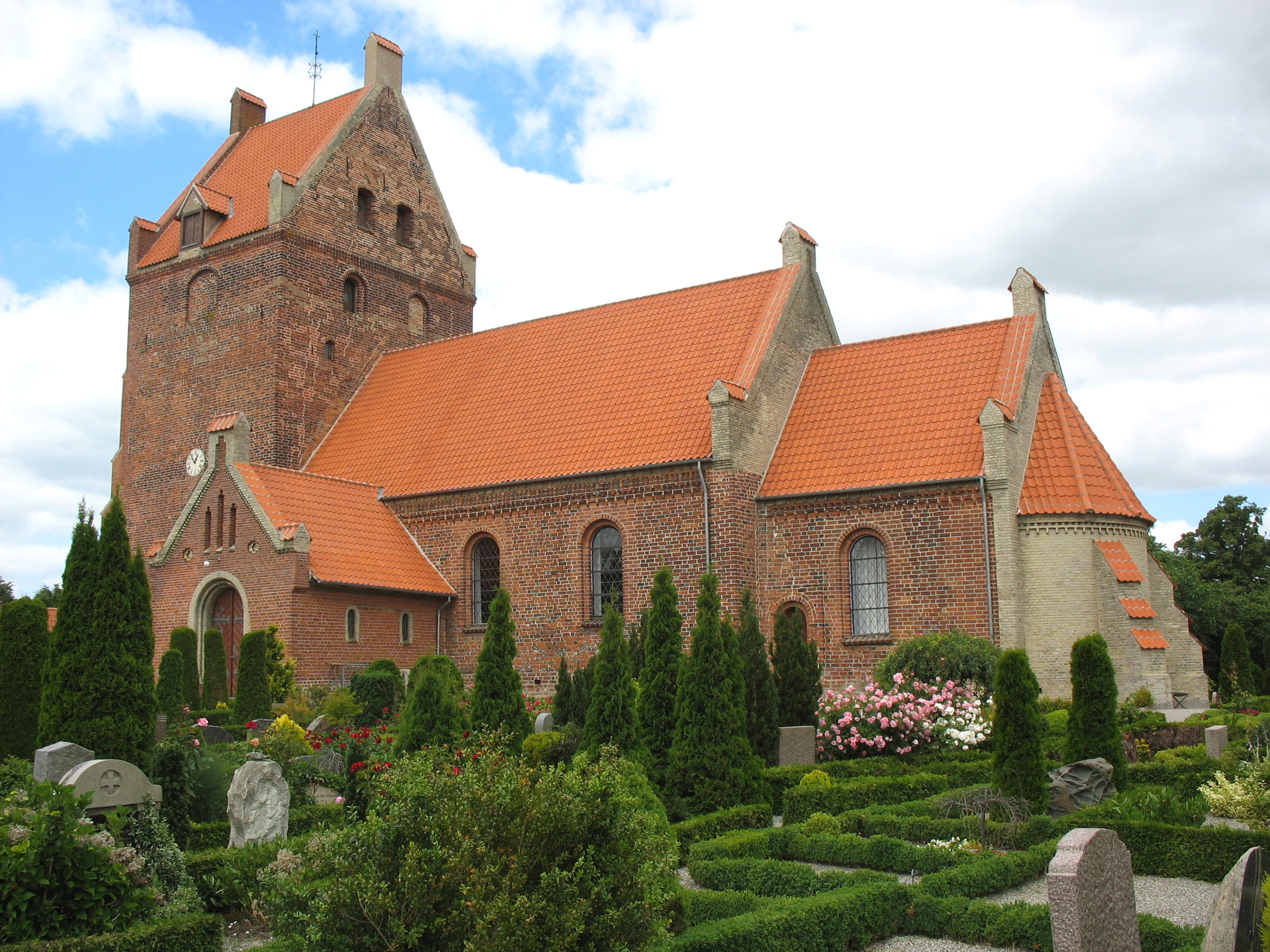
- Væggerløse Church, Falster

- Location on Falster Væggerløse (Denmark Region Zealand) Væggerløse (Denmark)
- Coordinates: 54°42′41″N 11°55′19″E
- Country: Denmark
- Region: Zealand (Sjælland)
- Municipality: Guldborgsund

Area
  - Urban: 0.41 sq mi (1.06 km^{2})

Population (2026)
  - Urban: 1,292
  - Urban density: 3,160/sq mi (1,220/km^{2})
- Time zone: UTC+1 (CET)
  - Summer (DST): UTC+2 (CEST)

Væggerløse is a town some 8 kilometres (5.0 mi) south of Nykøbing Falster on the Danish island of Falster. It has large housing developments and until 2006 was the administrative centre for the now defunct Sydfalster Municipality. In January 2026 it had a population of 1,292.

Standing on a hilltop, Væggerløse Church dates from the late Romanesque period. It has early 16th century frescos depicting the Supper at Emmaus.

== Notable people ==
- Christian Andersen (1896 in Væggerløse – 1982) a Danish sports shooter, competed in two events at the 1920 Summer Olympics
- Lars Pleidrup (born 1981 in Væggerløse) a Danish footballer who plays as a midfielder for Nykøbing FC; has over 540 club caps
