= Nicklas Halse =

Danish footballer (born 1997)

Personal information
- Date of birth: 3 May 1997 (age 29)
- Place of birth: Hvidovre, Denmark
- Height: 1.80 m (5 ft 11 in)
- Positions: Defensive midfielder; right-back

Team information
- Current team: Roskilde
- Number: 6

Youth career
- 2001–2014: Hvidovre
- 2014–2016: Brøndby

Senior career*
Years	Team	Apps	(Gls)
2014	Hvidovre	6	(0)
2014–2016	Brøndby	1	(0)
2016–2020	Roskilde	113	(5)
2020	Fjölnir	5	(0)
2021–2023	Hvidovre	26	(0)
2023–	Roskilde	67	(2)

International career
2012–2013	Denmark U16	4	(0)
2014–2015	Denmark U18	6	(0)
2015–2016	Denmark U19	4	(0)
- * Club domestic league appearances and goals as of 7 October 2025

Nicklas Halse (born 3 May 1997) is a Danish professional footballer who plays as a defensive midfielder for Danish 2nd Division club FC Roskilde. Halse has also represented Denmark at several youth levels.

== Club career ==
=== Hvidovre IF ===
Halse was born in Hvidovre, the son of Karsten Halse, a former player of Brøndby IF. He started his career with Hvidovre IF, making his senior debut on 23 March 2014 as a 17-year-old as a starter against Silkeborg IF.

=== Brøndby IF ===
On 15 July 2014, Halse signed a two-year contract with Brøndby IF, initially joining the club's under-19 team. He made his professional debut in the Danish Superliga under head coach Auri Skarbalius on 13 March 2015, replacing Christian Nørgaard in the 83rd minute of a 1–0 home win over Randers FC. This would remain his only professional for Brøndby.

=== FC Roskilde ===
Halse joined Danish 1st Division club FC Roskilde on 22 July 2016, signing a short-term contract. After impressing and growing into a starter for the club, Halse signed a two-year extension on 26 October keeping him at Roskilde until 2018.

He played four seasons with Roskilde in the Danish second tier, making 122 total appearances in which he managed to score five goals. He left the club after Roskilde's relegation in the 2019–20 season.

=== Fjölnir ===
On 10 September 2020, Halse moved to Fjölnir who were bottom of the top level Úrvalsdeild. He made his Fjölnir debut four days later, starting in a 2–2 draw against Grótta. After five appearances, he left after the club's relegation in October 2020.

=== Return to Hvidovre IF ===
Halse returned to his boyhood club Hvidovre IF on 20 January 2021 on a one-and-a-half-year deal.

=== Return to Roskilde ===
After Hvidovre IF was promoted to the 2023-24 Danish Superliga, Halse left the club and returned to his former club, FC Roskilde, signing a two-year deal in June 2023.

== Personal life ==
Halse tore his anterior cruciate ligament in November 2021, sidelining him for an extended period. While missing time on the pitch, he began working in customer service for Nykredit.

== Career statistics ==
=== Club ===
As of match played 6 November 2021

Appearances and goals by club, season and competition
Club	Season	League			National cup		Other		Total	
Club	Season	Division	Apps	Goals	Apps	Goals	Apps	Goals	Apps	Goals
Hvidovre IF	2013–14	1st Division	6	0	0	0	—		6	0
Brøndby IF	2014–15	Superliga	0	0	0	0	0	0	0	0
Brøndby IF	2015–16	Superliga	1	0	0	0	0	0	1	0
Brøndby IF	Total		1	0	0	0	0	0	1	0
FC Roskilde	2016–17	1st Division	22	1	3	0	—		25	1
FC Roskilde	2017–18	1st Division	28	2	1	0	—		29	2
FC Roskilde	2018–19	1st Division	31	0	3	0	—		34	0
FC Roskilde	2019–20	1st Division	32	2	2	0	—		34	2
FC Roskilde	Total		113	5	9	0	—		122	5
Fjölnir	2020	Úrvalsdeild	5	0	0	0	0	0	5	0
Hvidovre IF	2020–21	1st Division	13	0	0	0	—		13	0
Hvidovre IF	2021–22	1st Division	11	0	4	0	—		15	0
Hvidovre IF	2022–23	1st Division	0	0	0	0	—		0	0
Hvidovre IF	Total		24	0	4	0	—		28	0
Career total			149	5	13	0	0	0	162	5
