= Skovdahl =

Skovdahl is a Danish surname. Notable people with the surname include:

- Ebbe Skovdahl (1945–2020), Danish football manager
- Hilde Skovdahl (born 1969), Norwegian TV personality, speaker, author, local politician, and writer
- René Skovdahl (born 1970), Danish association football manager
