= Christian Andersen =

Christian Andersen may refer to:

- Christian Andersen (cyclist) (born 1967), Danish cyclist
- Christian Andersen (footballer) (born 1944), Danish football player and manager
- Christian Andersen (sport shooter) (1896–1982), Danish sports shooter
- Klumben (Christian Andersen, born 1987), Danish musician

== See also ==
- Christian Anderson Jr. (born 2006), German-American basketball player
- Hans Christian Andersen (1805–1875) Danish author
- Cristian Anderson Penilla Caicedo (born 1991), Ecuadorian football midfielder
