= Peter Bonde =

Danish footballer

Personal information
- Date of birth: 14 February 1958 (age 68)
- Place of birth: Næstved, Denmark
- Position: Defender

Team information
- Current team: Næstved BK (head of coaching); Denmark U-16 (assistant)

Senior career*
Years	Team	Apps	(Gls)
1976–1984	Næstved IF		
1984	Nørre Alslev BK		
1985	Stubbekøbing BK		
1985–1986	B 1901		
1987–1988	Herfølge BK		
1989–1990	Lyngby BK		
1995	Næstved IF		

Managerial career
- 1991–1992: Kalundborg GB
- 1993: Lyngby BK (assistant)
- 1994–1996: Næstved IF/BK
- 1997–1998: Nykøbing F. Alliancen
- 1998–1999: Næstved BK
- 2005–2006: Denmark (women)
- 2006–2016: Denmark (assistant)
- 2018–2019: China U-20 (women)
- 2021–2023: Næstved BK
- 2023–2024: Slagelse B&I (sporting director)
- 2024–: Næstved BK (head of coaching)
- 2024–: Denmark U-16 (assistant)
- * Club domestic league appearances and goals

Peter Bonde (born 14 February 1958) is a Danish former professional footballer who most recently was manager of Næstved BK. In 2018 he became the head coach of the China women's national under-20 football team.
