= Anders Theil =

Danish footballer and manager (born 1970)

Personal information
- Full name: Anders Theil
- Date of birth: 3 March 1970 (age 56)
- Place of birth: Denmark
- Height: 1.92 m (6 ft 4 in)
- Position: Goalkeeper

Team information
- Current team: FC Roskilde (director of sport)

Senior career*
Years	Team	Apps	(Gls)
- Fløng
1990–1993	BK Frem	3	(0)
- FC Roskilde
	Hvidovre IF	0	(0)
- KB
1995	Køge BK	5	(0)
- KFUM Roskilde
1999–2002	BK Frem	15	(0)

Managerial career
- 2003–2005: Boldklubben Frem (assistant)
- 2005–2009: Boldklubben Frem
- 2009–2012: FC Roskilde (assistant)
- 2012–2017: FC Roskilde
- 2017–: FC Roskilde (director of sport)
- 2020: FC Roskilde (caretaker)
- 2023: FC Roskilde (caretaker)
- 2024: FC Roskilde (caretaker)
- * Club domestic league appearances and goals

Anders Theil (born 3 March 1970) is a Danish football manager and former player. He is currently Director of Sport at FC Roskilde.

At BK Frem his contract was set to expire on 30 June 2011, but in July 2009 he left the club.

He then became assistant manager at FC Roskilde. When Roskilde-manager Carsten Broe was sacked at the end of the 2011–12 season, Theil was installed as caretaker manager. On 4 July 2012 he was given a more permanent contract. In June 2017 he was promoted and became Director of Sport at FC Roskilde. Following the departure of Morten Uddberg as manager in October 2020, Theil was made caretaker manager for the rest of 2020. When Jack Majgaard was sacked in April 2023, Theil was once again made caretaker of Roskilde. In October 2024 he became careakter again, when Mikkel Thygesen resigned.
