= Frederik Christensen =

Danish footballer (born 1995)

Personal information
- Date of birth: 7 March 1995 (age 31)
- Place of birth: Slagelse, Denmark
- Position: Forward

Team information
- Current team: Næstved
- Number: 9

Youth career
- Slagelse B&I
- –2015: Vestsjælland

Senior career*
Years	Team	Apps	(Gls)
2015–2016	Vestsjælland	14	(1)
2016–2019	Slagelse B&I		
2019–2020	BK Frem	19	(3)
2020–2021	Slagelse B&I	24	(8)
2021–	Næstved	140	(34)
- * Club domestic league appearances and goals as of 3 October 2026

Frederik Christensen (born 7 March 1995) is a Danish professional footballer who plays as a forward for Danish 2nd Division club Næstved Boldklub.

== Club career ==
=== FC Vestsjælland ===
Christensen signed his first professional contract in May 2015. He was the first player in the history of FCV, who signed a professional contract, coming from the youth teams of the club.

On 7 June 2015, Christensen got his professional and Superliga debut for FCV, in a match against Silkeborg IF, where he was in the lineup, but was taken out in the 55nd minute.

=== BK Frem ===
At the end of June 2019, BK Frem announced that Christensen had joined the club from Slagelse B&I.

=== Return to Slagelse ===
On 26 July 2020, Christensen returned to Slagelse B&I.

=== Næstved ===
After a season in Slagelse, Christensen moved to Næstved Boldklub on 26 June 2021.

=== Statistics ===
As of 1 August 2015

Club performance			League		Cup		Continental		Total	
Season	Club	League	Apps	Goals	Apps	Goals	Apps	Goals	Apps	Goals
Denmark			League		Danish Cup		Europe		Total	
2014–15	FC Vestsjælland	Superliga	1	0	1	0	—		2	0
2015–16	FC Vestsjælland	Superliga	3	0	1	0	—		4	0
Career total			4	0	2	0			6	0
