= Væggerløse Church =

Coordinates: 54°42′42″N 11°55′19″E

- Væggerløse Kirke
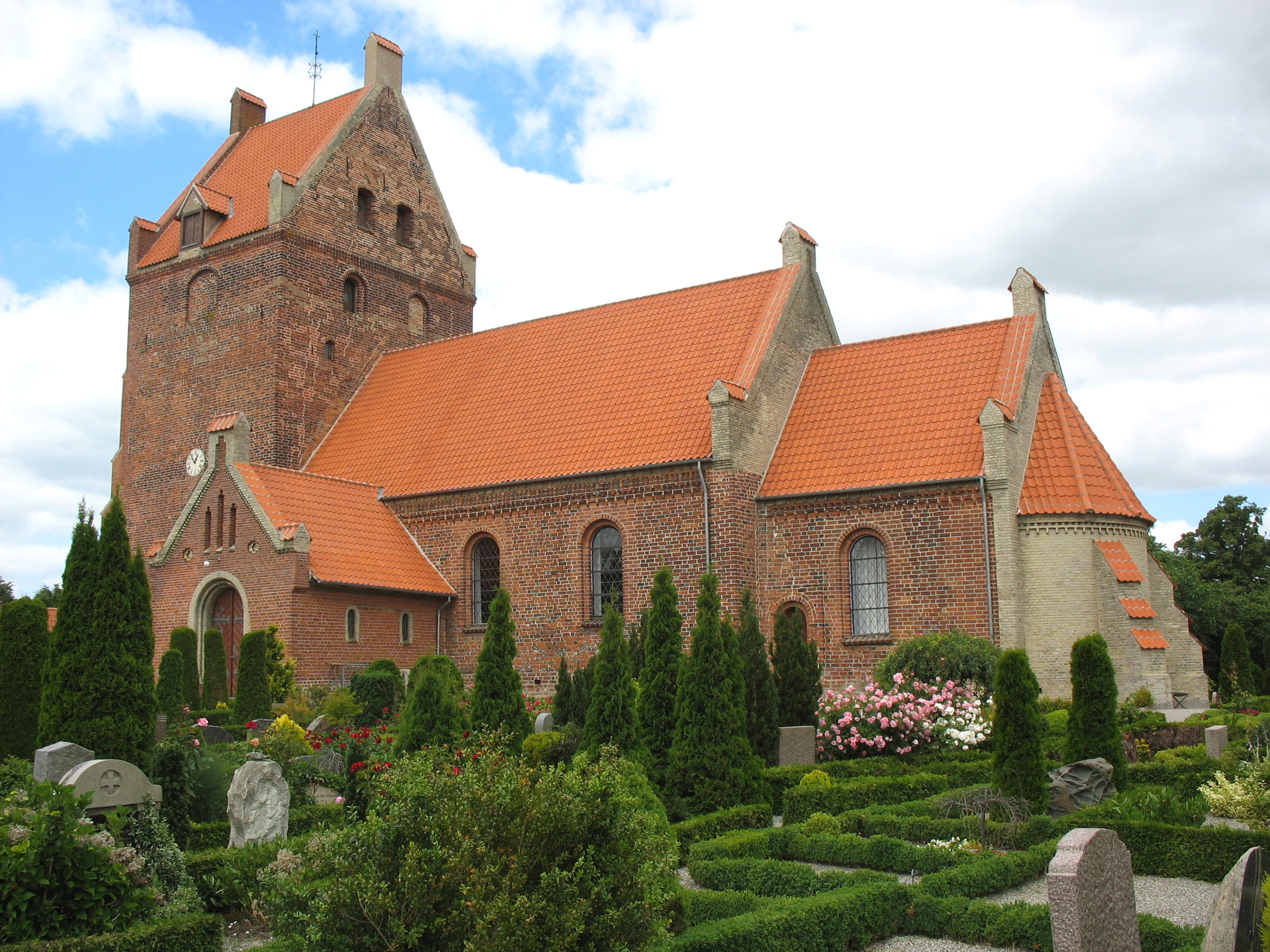
- Væggerløse Church
- Location: Væggerløse, Falster
- Country: Denmark
- Denomination: Church of Denmark

History
- Dedication: Saint Olaf

Administration
- Diocese: Diocese of Lolland–Falster
- Deanery: Falster Provsti
- Parish: Væggerløse Sogn

Væggerløse Church (Danish: Væggerløse Kirke) is a Romanesque church in the village of Væggerløse, 7 kilometres (4.3 mi) south of Nykøbing on the Danish island of Falster. Its early 16th century frescos depict the Supper at Emmaus.

== History ==
In the Middle Ages the church was dedicated to St Olaf. The chancel and nave from the late Romanesque period were built in brick on a profiled plinth with pilaster strips on the corners. The chancel's pilaster strips now only remain on its southwest corner. Originally there was also an apse which was torn down but later replaced during the restoration work in 1861 by the Hamburg architect Ernst Heinrich Glüer. On that occasion, the south door was bricked up but the door frame remains. The tower is from the Late Gothic period.

== Interior ==
The chancel and the nave have a flat-beamed ceiling. The altarpiece painting of Christ Resurrected is by Heinrich Hoffman (1868). The pulpit from c. 1640 is the work of Jørgen Ringnis, similar to that in Aastrup Church. Its large shell-framed panels depict the four evangelists. The Early Gothic crucifix on the north wall of the nave, c. 175 cm high, is from the late 13th century.

== Frescos ==
In 1906, frescos from c. 1520 were discovered in the tower vault. Painted on a thin layer of whitewash, they were in poor condition. The south segment depicted the Adoration of the Magi, the fresco on the east segment could not be identified and that on the north side showed Christ's entry into Jerusalem followed by haloed apostles. The fresco on the west segment, depicting a lively scene of the Supper at Emmaus, was in good enough condition to be preserved. Christ sits with two distinguished gentlemen at a finely set table with bread and a spotted leg of venison. There are two servants, one carrying a bowl, the other pouring wine from a jug. The woman lying on the floor in the foreground is perhaps Mary Magdelene. The colours are grey, russet, ochre and green.

== Gallery ==
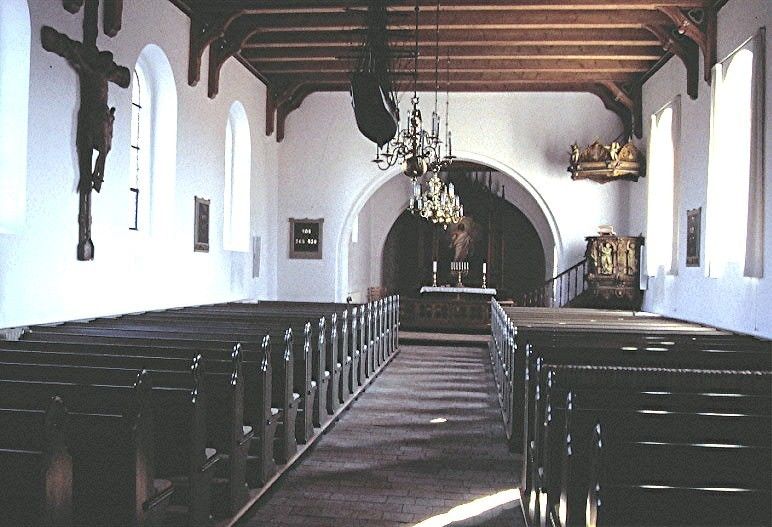
nave

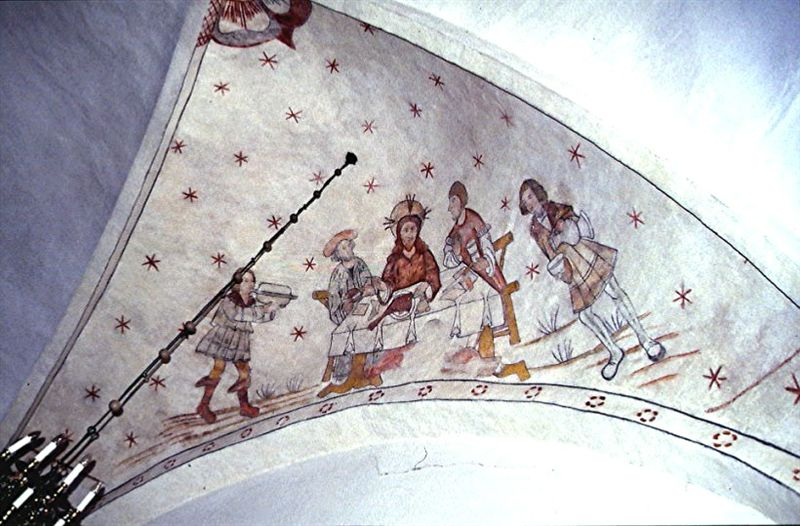
Supper at Emmaus

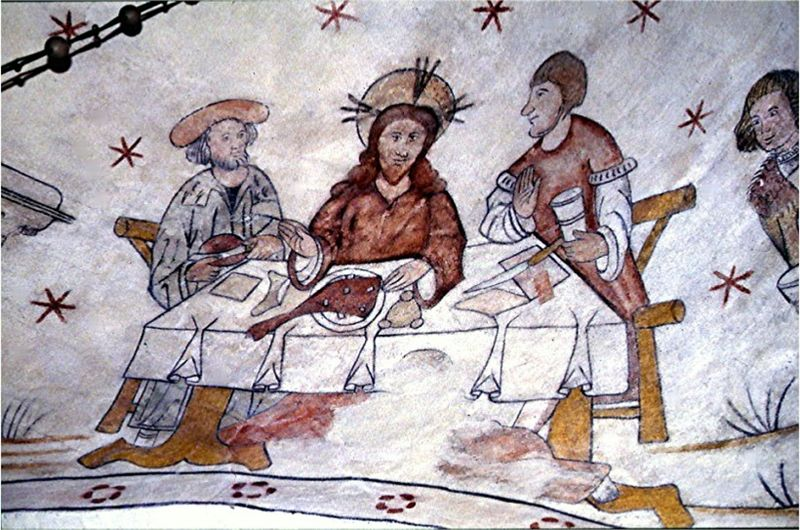
Detail of table

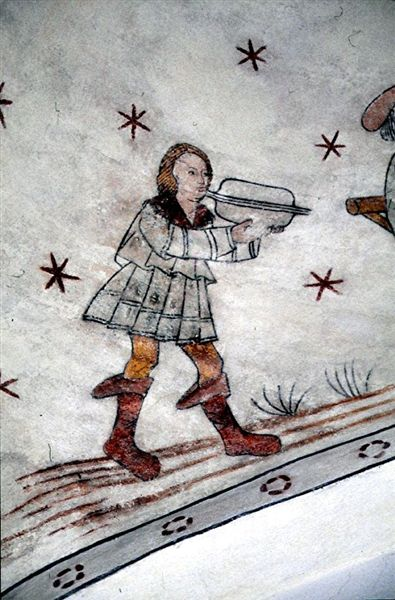
Servant with bowl

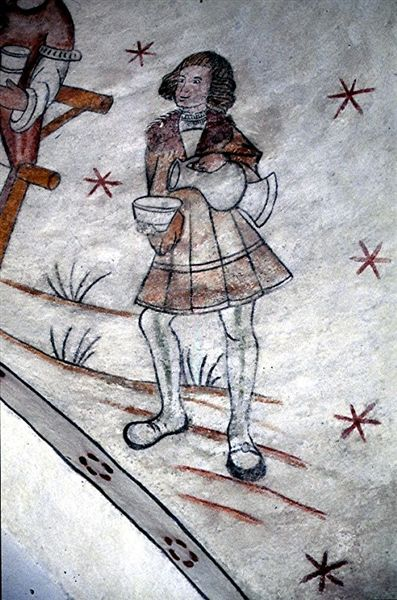
Servant with wine

== Bibliography ==
- Kirsten Weber-Andersen, Otto Norn, Aage Roussell, Gertrud Købke Knudsen, Danmarks kirker: Maribo amt, Vol. 8, 1951, Nationalmuseet, pages 1345 to 1358. (in Danish)
