= Jeppe Tengbjerg =

Danish footballer and manager (born 1973)

Personal information
- Full name: Jeppe Tengbjerg
- Date of birth: 28 December 1973 (age 52)
- Place of birth: Denmark
- Position: Midfielder

Youth career
- KB
- 1989–1992: PSV

Senior career*
| Years | Team | Apps | (Gls) |
| 1992–1993 | Næstved | 33 | (7) |
| 1993–1996 | Cambuur | | |
| 1994 | → Excelsior (loan) | | |
| 1996 | Ikast fS | 1 | (0) |
| 1996–1998 | Hvidovre | 18 | (4) |
| 1998–2000 | B.93 | | |
| 2000–2004 | Nordsjælland | | |
| 2004–2005 | Næstved | | |
| 2005–2007 | Slagelse B&I | | |

International career^{‡}
| 1988–1990 | Denmark U17 | 33 | (21) |
| 1990–1993 | Denmark U19 | 12 | (8) |
| 1993 | Denmark U21 | 1 | (0) |

Managerial career
- 2005–2008: Slagelse B&I
- 2008–2009: Vestsjælland
- 2009–2011: B.93
- 2011–2013: LFA
- 2013: Nykøbing
- 2014–2015: Vestsjælland (head of academy)
- 2017–2019: Næstved (head of academy)
- * Club domestic league appearances and goals as of end of career ‡ National team caps and goals as of end of career

Jeppe Tengbjerg (born 28 December 1973) is a Danish football manager and former football player. In his playing career, Tengbjerg represented a number of Danish clubs, as well as Dutch clubs SC Cambuur and Excelsior Rotterdam.

== Managerial career ==
In 2005, he started his management career as playing manager of Slagelse B&I. He continued to manage the club, when it in 2008 changed its name to FC Vestsjælland. In March 2009 he was fired due to poor results and replaced by Michael Schjønberg. In June 2009 he was named new manager of B93.

In June 2011 he replaced Jesper Tollefsen as manager of Lolland-Falster Alliancen.
