= Jean Thome =

Ivorian footballer

Personal information
- Full name: Yobou Jean Noel Thome
- Date of birth: 10 October 1995 (age 31)
- Place of birth: Divo, Ivory Coast
- Height: 1.75 m (5 ft 9 in)
- Position: Defender

Youth career
- Aspire Academy

Senior career*
Years	Team	Apps	(Gls)
2014	Kruoja	15	(1)
2014–2015	FC Vestsjælland	7	(0)
2016	Al-Ahli Tripoli		
2016	DCMP		
2017	Gällivare	11	(1)
- * Club domestic league appearances and goals

Yobou Jean Noel Thome (born 10 October 1995) is an Ivorian former footballer who is last known to have played as a defender for Gällivare.

== Club career ==
As a youth player, Thome joined the Qatari Aspire Academy. At the age of 15, he almost joined the youth academy of Spanish La Liga side Barcelona. Before the 2014 season, he signed for Kruoja in Lithuania. In 2014, Thome signed for Danish top flight club FC Vestsjælland, where he made eight appearances and suffered relegation to the Danish second tier. On 17 August 2014, he debuted for FC Vestsjælland during a 2–0 win over Silkeborg. Before the second half of 2015–16, Thome signed for Al-Ahli Tripoli in Libya. In 2016, he signed for Congolese top flight club DCMP. Before the 2017 season, he signed for Gällivare in the Swedish fourth tier.

== International career ==
Thome represented Ivory Coast at the 2011 FIFA U-17 World Cup.
