= Azrudin Valentić =

Bosnia and Herzegovina footballer (born 1970)

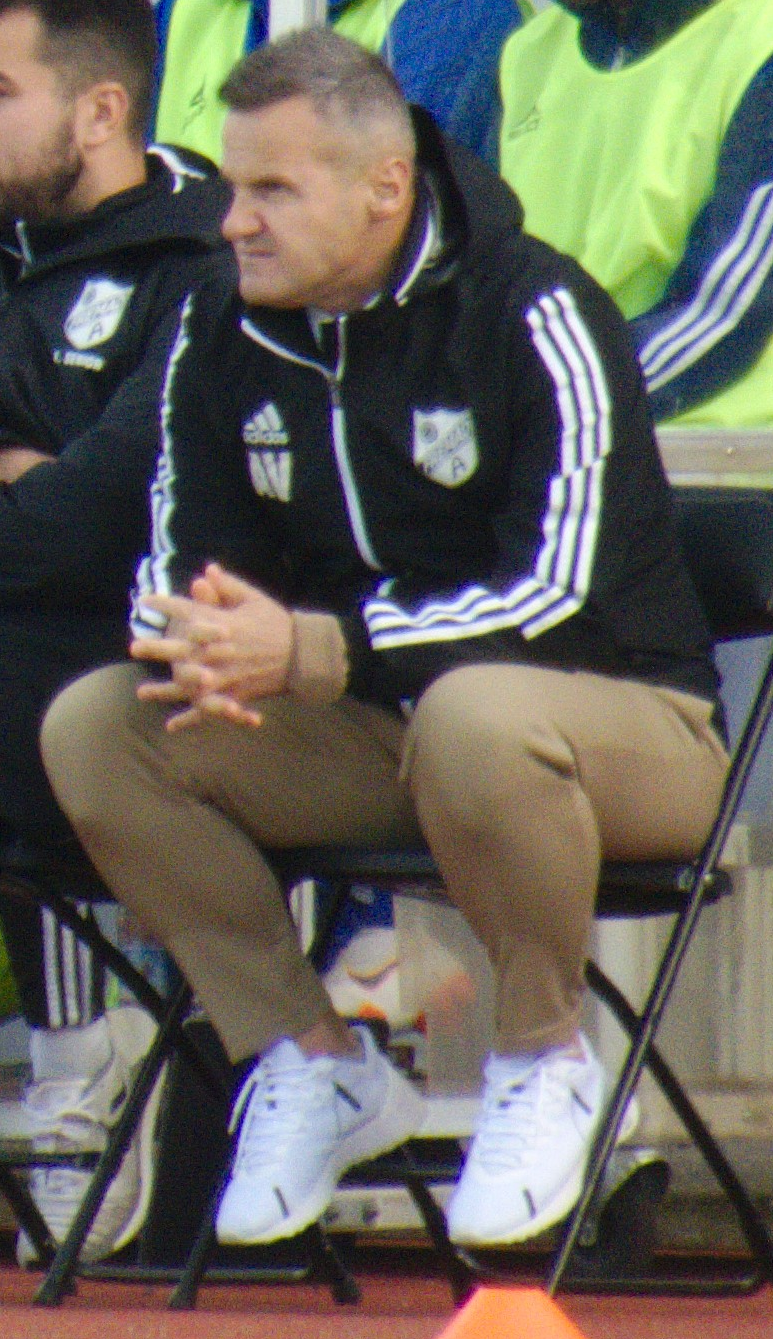
- Valentić in 2019 with Fremad Amager

Personal information
- Date of birth: 21 July 1970 (age 56)
- Place of birth: Sarajevo, SFR Yugoslavia
- Position: Midfielder

Youth career
- FK Sarajevo

Senior career*
| Years | Team | Apps | (Gls) |
| 1990–1994 | FK Sarajevo | | |
| 1994–1995 | Raith Rovers | | |
| 1996 | Vorwärts Steyr | 17 | (1) |
| 1996–1997 | Olimpija Ljubljana | 22 | (1) |
| 1997–2000 | FK Sarajevo | | |

Managerial career
- 2009–2011: Vasalunds IF
- 2012–2015: Assyriska FF
- 2016–2017: IF Brommapojkarna (assistant)
- 2018: Dalkurd FF
- 2018–2019: Fremad Amager
- 2019–2021: Fremad Amager
- 2021–2022: Botev Plovdiv
- * Club domestic league appearances and goals

Azrudin Valentić (born 21 July 1970), known as Vali is a Bosnian professional football manager and former player.

== Club career ==
Valentić started out his playing career in Bosnian club FK Sarajevo where he won the league. He then went on to play for Raith Rovers in Scotland and SK Vorwärts Steyr in Austria before his career ended because of injury.

== Managerial career ==
Valentić moved to Sweden in 2002 and four years later started working for Vasalunds IF as an individual coach before becoming their manager in 2009. In 2011, he took over as manager for Assyriska FF.

=== Fremad Amager ===
Valentić was appointed manager of Fremad Amager at the end of October 2018.

On 1 July 2019, Fremad Amager announced, that Olof Mellberg had joined the club as their new manager. Vali was reinforced with Mellberg, who he worked with in IF Brommapojkarna. With the access of Mellberg, the club changed the structure of the sporting staff, with Mellberg becoming manager and Vali becoming the first team coach. However, only two months after Mellberg's arrival, he left the club and Valentić was re-appointed as the manager of the club. He guided the club to a 4th place in the 2019–20 Danish 1st Division (second tier).

=== Botev Plovdiv ===
In January 2021 Valentić was signed by Bulgarian side Botev Plovdiv.

== Managerial statistics ==
As of 28 July 2022

| Team | From | To | Record | | | | |
| Team | From | To | G | W | D | L | Win % |
|---|---|---|---|---|---|---|---|
| Vasalund | 25 August 2009 | 31 December 2011 | 13 | 4 | 5 | 4 | 30.77 |
| Assyriska | 1 January 2012 | 27 May 2014 | 78 | 26 | 17 | 35 | 33.33 |
| Assyriska | 18 September 2014 | 20 October 2015 | 41 | 17 | 11 | 13 | 41.46 |
| Dalkurd | 1 January 2018 | 25 May 2018 | 13 | 1 | 2 | 10 | 7.69 |
| Fremad Amager | 31 October 2018 | 1 July 2019 | 18 | 9 | 5 | 4 | 50.00 |
| Fremad Amager | 3 September 2019 | 1 January 2021 | 48 | 22 | 10 | 16 | 45.83 |
| Botev Plovdiv | 6 January 2021 | 29 July 2022 | 52 | 19 | 14 | 19 | 36.54 |
| Total | | | 266 | 99 | 65 | 102 | 37.22 |
