= Carsten Broe =

Danish football manager

Personal information
- Full name: Carsten Broe
- Date of birth: 18 October 1963 (age 63)
- Place of birth: Denmark

Managerial career
- Years: Team
- 1987–19??: Vindinge BK
- 1994–1998: RB1906
- 1998–2000: Ølstykke FC
- 2000–2006: Nykøbing FA/LFA
- 2007–2009: SønderjyskE
- 2010–2012: FC Roskilde
- 2013: FA 2000
- 2015–2016: FA 2000 (Director of Sports)
- 2016: FA 2000 (caretaker)
- 2016–2017: Herlev IF

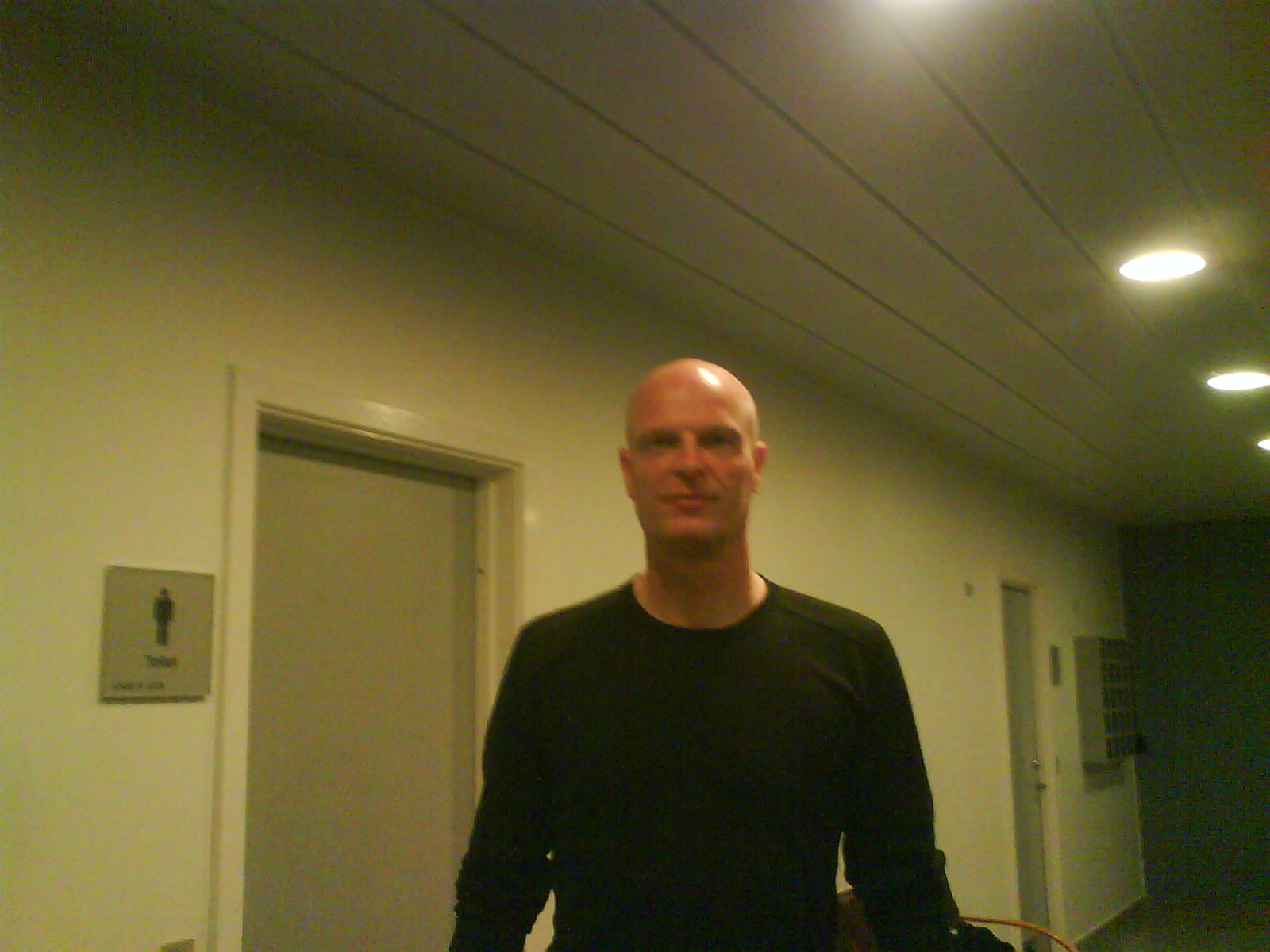

Carsten Broe (born 18 October 1963) is a Danish football manager. He was most recently manager of Herlev IF in the Denmark Series.

As a 24-year-old, he was named new manager of minor club Vindinge BK. He later went to RB1906, who he led from Denmark Series to the Danish 1st Division. He later coached Ølstykke FC and Nykøbing Falster Alliancen. In 2007, he was named the new head coach of SønderjyskE, a post he resigned on 6 June 2009.

In 2010, he returned as manager to his former club Roskilde. He was sacked by Roskilde on 21 May 2012. He then became manager of FA 2000 in the Denmark Series.

In January 2015 he became new Director of Sports of his former club FA 2000.

In November 2016 he became new manager of Herlev IF.
