= Henrik Eggerts =

Danish footballer (born 1983)

Personal information
- Full name: Henrik Eggerts Hansen
- Date of birth: 14 November 1976 (age 49)
- Place of birth: Denmark
- Positions: Midfielder; winger

Senior career*
Years	Team	Apps	(Gls)
1997–2002	Hvidovre IF		
2002–2003	Køge Boldklub	7	(2)
2003–2006	FC Nordsjælland	29	(1)
2006–2007	Akademisk Boldklub		
2007–2008	Knattspyrnufélagið Fram	9	(0)
2008	Valur	9	(1)
- * Club domestic league appearances and goals

Henrik Eggerts Hansen (born 14 November 1976) is a Danish former footballer who played as a midfielder or winger.

== Career ==
Eggerts started his career with Danish side Hvidovre IF. In 2002, he signed for Danish side Køge Boldklub. He debuted for the club during a 3–1 win over Aarhus Gymnastikforening. In 2003, he signed for Danish side FC Nordsjælland. He was regarded as one of the club's most important players. In 2006, he signed for Danish side Akademisk Boldklub. In 2007, he signed for Icelandic side Knattspyrnufélagið Fram. In 2008, he signed for Icelandic side Valur.

== Style of play ==
Eggerts mainly operated as a midfielder or winger. He was known for his dribbling ability.
