= Christian Andersen (sport shooter) =

Danish sports shooter (1896–1982)

Personal information
- Born: Jens Christian Ludvig Pedersen Andersen; 10 December 1896 Væggerløse, Denmark
- Died: 29 July 1982 (aged 85) Væggerløse, Denmark

Sport
- Sport: Sports shooting

Jens Christian Ludvig Pedersen Andersen (10 December 1896 – 29 July 1982) was a Danish sports shooter. He competed in two events at the 1920 Summer Olympics.
