= Michael Schjønberg =

Danish footballer (born 1967)

Personal information
- Full name: Michael Schjønberg Christensen
- Date of birth: 19 January 1967 (age 59)
- Place of birth: Esbjerg, Denmark
- Height: 1.91 m (6 ft 3 in)
- Positions: Centre-back; full-back; defensive midfielder

Senior career*
Years	Team	Apps	(Gls)
1987–1990	Esbjerg fB	89	(14)
1990–1994	Hannover 96	123	(12)
1994–1996	OB	64	(14)
1996–2001	1. FC Kaiserslautern	117	(13)
Total		393	(53)

International career
1995–2000	Denmark	44	(3)

Managerial career
- 2003–2004: 1. FC Kaiserslautern (youth)
- 2004–2005: Herfølge BK
- 2006: Hannover 96 (caretaker)
- 2006–2007: Hannover 96 II
- 2009–2011: FC Vestsjælland
- 2014–2015: Nest-Sotra
- 2016: FC Svendborg
- 2018–2020: Aarup BK
- 2020–2021: Vendsyssel FF
- 2022–2023: 07 Vestur
- 2023–2025: AGF
- 2025–2026: 07 Vestur
- 2026–: Esbjerg fB W
Medal record
Men's football
Representing Denmark
FIFA Confederations Cup
Winner	1995 Saudi Arabia
- * Club domestic league appearances and goals

Michael Schjønberg Christensen (Danish pronunciation: [ˈmi.kʰæːl ˈsjønˌpɛɐ̯]; born 19 January 1967) is a Danish football manager, club official, and former player. He is the head coach of Danish B-Liga club Esbjerg fB.

During his active career, he played more than 100 games for both German clubs Hannover 96 and 1. FC Kaiserslautern, winning the 1991–92 DFB-Pokal with Hannover and the 1997–98 Bundesliga championship with Kaiserslautern. He also represented Danish clubs Esbjerg fB and OB. He played 44 games and scored three goals for the Denmark national team, and was a participant at the international 1995 King Fahd Cup, Euro 1996, 1998 FIFA World Cup, and Euro 2000 tournaments.

After suffering a career-ending injury in 2001, he became a football coach in 2003. He first became manager of Danish club Herfølge BK in 2004, alongside Allan Nielsen. He has held a number of coaching and club official positions in his former German clubs, and was caretaker manager of Hannover 96 in 2006.

== Club career ==
Born in Esbjerg, Schjønberg started his career as an attacking midfielder for hometown club Esbjerg fB, playing in 103 first team matches in total. He and Esbjerg teammate Jesper Kristensen went to a training session with Esbjerg native Allan Nielsen at Nielsen's German club FC Bayern Munich in the winter of 1989.

=== Hannover 96 ===
When Bayern's amateur team coach Hans-Dieter Schmidt later became manager of German club Hannover 96, he remembered Schjønberg and offered him a contract. In 1990, Schjønberg moved abroad to play for the 2. Bundesliga side.

At Hannover, he was converted to a defensive player, and eventually settled in as left wingback. He won his first trophy as a senior player, when the club surprisingly beat top flight Borussia Mönchengladbach, to win the 1991–92 DFB-Pokal. The game ended in a penalty shoot-out, where Schjønberg scored the deciding kick to secure the triumph for Hannover 96. Unhappy with the new contractual offer from Hannover 96, Schjønberg looked ready to move back to Denmark to play for OB in summer 1992. After the DFB-Pokal win, he received an improved contract, and became team captain. However, he had a hard time getting into the Danish national team. After 123 league games and 12 goals for Hannover 96, he looked around for a new club in the summer of 1994.

=== OB ===
Schjønberg moved to OB in 1994, in a transfer deal worth DKK 700,000. The transfer came, as Schjønberg felt more likely to secure a place in the Danish national team when playing for a Danish club. He was called up for the national team in January 1995. With OB, he reached the quarter-final of the 1994–95 UEFA Cup. It was OB's greatest European result, as the club eliminated Spanish giants Real Madrid (against whom Schjønberg scored in the first leg) before being narrowly defeated by Italian side AC Parma in the quarter-finals.

=== 1. FC Kaiserslautern ===
After UEFA Euro 1996, he moved back to Germany, to play for 2. Bundesliga team 1. FC Kaiserslautern in a transfer deal worth DEM 1.35 million. In his first year at the club, 1. FC Kaiserslautern won promotion to the Bundesliga. His success continued, as the club remarkably went on to win the title upon their return to the top flight.

Schjønberg was an important part of this achievement. He scored the club's very first goal of the 1997–98 season, in the opening game against defending champions Bayern Munich. Ten minutes before the final whistle, Schjønberg headed the ball in after a cross from Swiss midfielder Ciriaco Sforza and secured a 1–0 win. This victory was the beginning of Kaiserslautern's fairytale, and Schjønberg went on to play 32 of 34 league games and to score four goals, as the club became the first ever 2. Bundesliga promotees to immediately win the Bundesliga title. Returning to Kaiserslautern after the 1998 FIFA World Cup, Schjønberg was heavily injured early in the 1998–99 season. In September 1998, Schjønberg collided with VfL Bochum goalkeeper Thomas Ernst, and broke his shinbone. He underwent a seven-month period of rehabilitation and returned in April 1999.

Schjønberg made a memorable appearance in the penultimate match of the 1999–2000 season. In the game against SC Freiburg, first-choice goalkeeper Georg Koch was injured and the substitute goalkeeper Uwe Gospodarek replaced him. By the half-time break, Gospodarek had suffered an injury of his own, and with no more goalkeepers selected for the match squad, Schjønberg took over the keeper's gloves. In the 59th minute, Levan Kobiashvili scored against Schjønberg to give SC Freiburg a 2–1 lead, but Schjønberg otherwise kept his sheet clean. He crowned his achievement with a saved penalty kick, when he held the shot from Alexander Iashvili in the 84th minute.

In Kaiserslautern's 2000–01 season, he suffered another injury in just the second game, against VfL Wolfsburg. He returned in December that year, and eventually regained his place back in the starting line-up. Such injuries caught up with him though, and due to old injuries and acute knee problems, he had to promptly terminate his football career after the 2000–01 season. He played 117 league games and scored 13 goals in his time for 1. FC Kaiserslautern.

== International career ==
Schjønberg made his debut for the Denmark national team in the 1995 King Fahd Cup in January 1995. He played all three of Denmark's matches at the tournament, which they eventually won. He was also selected for the 1996 European Championship, where he played in Denmark's last two group games before elimination.

After this memorable domestic season, Schjønberg was selected to play for Denmark at the 1998 World Cup in France, where he played four of Denmark's five matches before elimination. He began the tournament as Denmark's starting left wingback, but eventually lost the place to Jan Heintze as the tournament progressed. He was called up to represent Denmark at Euro 2000, and started in Denmark's three matches before elimination. The last group match against the Czech Republic on 21 June 2000, would be Schjønberg's last game for the national team.

== Managerial career ==
After ending his active football career, Schjønberg changed into the coaching business when he became youth coach at 1. FC Kaiserslautern in July 2003. He moved to Denmark in July 2004, to coach Danish Superliga club Herfølge BK, alongside his good friend Allan Nielsen. Herfølge BK were relegated to the Danish 1st Division, but Schjønberg kept his job. In November 2005, he became assistant coach of Hannover 96 to manager Peter Neururer. When Neururer was fired in September 2006, Schjønberg deputised as head coach for a single DFB-Pokal match, where Hannover 96 eliminated Dynamo Dresden. When Hannover 96 hired Dieter Hecking as new head coach, he brought Dirk Bremser with him as assistant coach, and Schjønberg became the coach of the amateur ranks of the club.

From 4 April 2007 until 7 November 2007 he was sports director of 1. FC Kaiserslautern.

In the summer of 2008, he was appointed new sporting director of Danish club FC Vestsjælland and was named as the head coach of the club on 1 April 2009, Schjønberg replaced Jeppe Tengbjerg. He was sacked on 29 June 2011 due to a poor finish to the 2010–11 season.

In January 2013, he was appointed as first-team coach with the Norwegian side Vålerenga Fotball. Vålerengas manager, Kjetil Rekdal, knew Schjønberg from his time at Kaiserslautern where he had worked under him. In November 2014, he was appointed manager of Nest-Sotra Fotball in the Norwegian First Division. He was sacked already in May 2015.

In the summer of 2016, he became manager of FC Svendborg in the Danish 2nd Division. However, due to financial problems the club could not afford his salary, and he left the club in December 2016. In June 2018 he became new manager of lower league club Aarup Boldklub.

On 16 December 2020, he was named new manager of Vendsyssel FF in the Danish 1st Division. At the end of the season, where Vendsyssel only barely escaped relegation, Schjønberg decided to reject Vendsyssel's two-year contract extension due to personal reasons and therefore left the club.

On 13 January 2022, Schjønberg was appointed manager of Faroese club 07 Vestur.

In July 2023, Schjønberg became new manager of the women's team of AGF.

In May 2025, he left AGF in order to return as manager of 07 Vestur. In June 2026, he left Vestur by mutual consent.

== Honours ==
Hannover 96

- DFB-Pokal: 1991–92

1. FC Kaiserslautern

- Bundesliga: 1997–98

Denmark

- King Fahd Cup: 1995
