= Robert Tranberg =

Swedish footballer (born 1969)

Personal information
- Full name: Per Robert Tranberg
- Date of birth: 21 July 1969 (age 57)
- Place of birth: Gothenburg, Sweden
- Height: 1.88 m (6 ft 2 in)
- Position: Goalkeeper

Youth career
- 1976–1989: Västra Frölunda IF

Senior career*
Years	Team	Apps	(Gls)
1989–1999	Västra Frölunda IF	130	(0)
- * Club domestic league appearances and goals

Per Robert Tranberg (born 21 July 1969) is a Swedish former professional footballer who played as a goalkeeper.

== Career ==
Tranberg played for Västra Frölunda IF between 1976 and 1999, making 67 Allsvenskan appearances for the club in the 1990s. He made his senior debut for Västra Frölunda on 11 June 1989 in a match against Malmö FF. After his retirement from professional football, he played at lower level for BK Skottfint and FC Fiskebäck.

After his career, Tranberg created several websites for Swedish football clubs, including those for the Allsvenskan clubs Västra Frölunda IF, GAIS, and Kopparbergs/Göteborg FC.

== Honours ==
Västra Frölunda IF

- Division 1 – Södra: 1997
