= FC Vestsjælland =

Football club in Slagelse, Denmark, 2008–2015

- Full name: Football Club Vestsjælland
- Nickname: Vikingerne (The Vikings)
- Short name: FCV
- Founded: 8 July 2008; 18 years ago
- Dissolved: 9 December 2015; 10 years ago
- Ground: Harboe Arena Slagelse, Slagelse
- Capacity: 10,000
- Coordinates: 55°23′58″N 11°21′51.40″E
- President: Kurt Andersen
- Last head coach: Michael Hemmingsen
- League: Danish 1st Division
- 2015–16: 12th of 12 (relegated)
- Website: www.fcvvikings.dk
Home colours	Away colours

FC Vestsjælland, also known as FCV Vikings, was a professional Danish association football club that played in the Danish 1st Division until its bankruptcy on 9 December 2015. Where it was force relegated to the Sjællandserie but Slagelse B&I already had a team there. They played their home matches at Harboe Arena Slagelse in Slagelse, which has a capacity of 10,000 (3,300 seats). The club was an elite merger between Slagelse B&I, Vemmelev Fodbold and 7 other local football clubs.

== History ==
FC Vestsjælland was founded in January 2008 as the professional structure comprising the first team of the mother club, Slagelse B&I (SBI). On 9 December 2015, FC Vestsjælland was declared bankrupt.

== Colours and badge ==
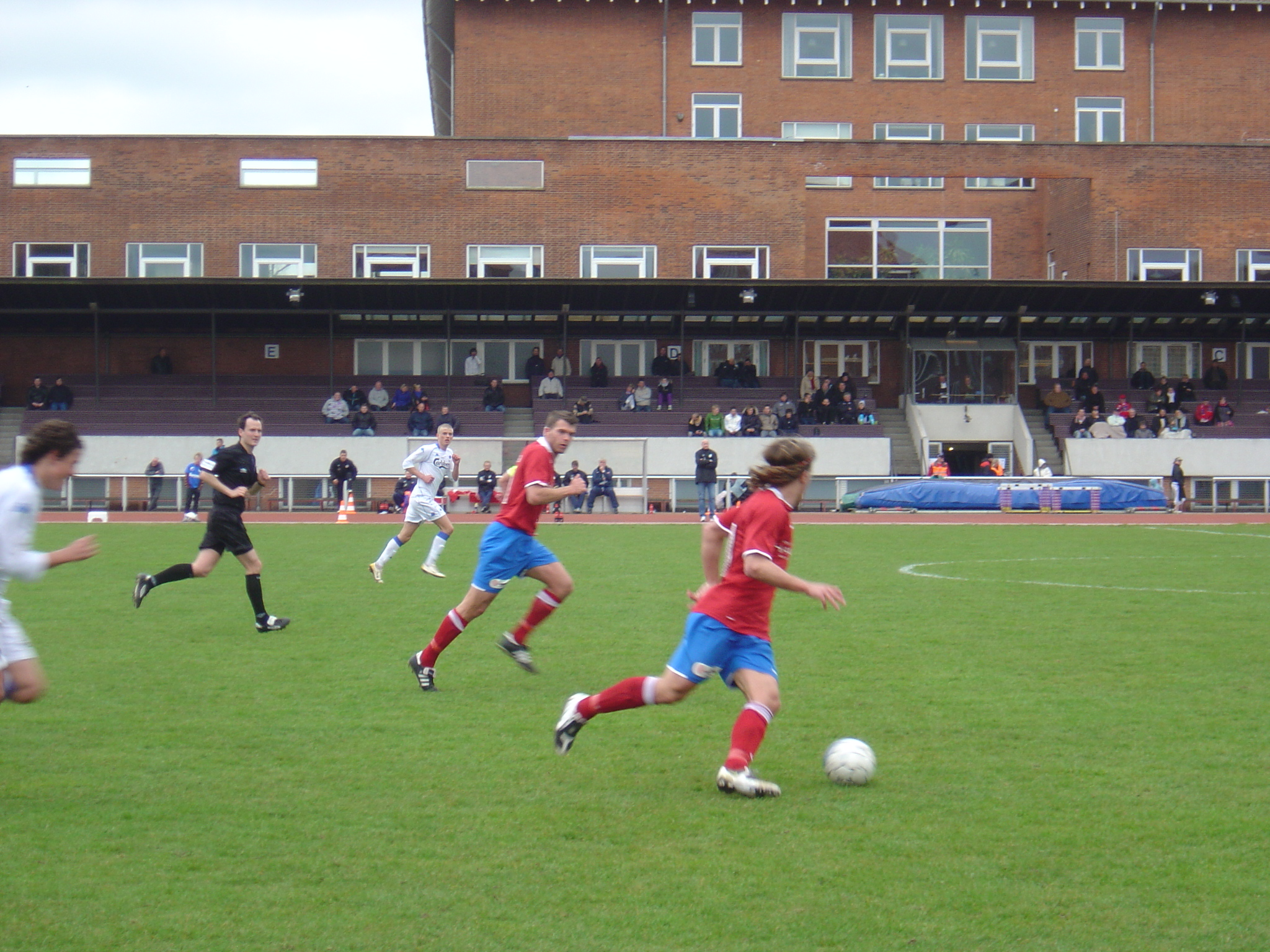
Borrowing from Slagelse B&I, Vestsjælland shared the same colours of red and blue.

Waiting until pre-season training in the summer of 2008, Vestsjælland unveiled the new club's official kit. With the launch of the superstructure project, it was decided to preserve and continue with the traditional colors of Slagelse B&I, red and blue. The overall design remain largely unchanged throughout their history featuring a red shirt, blue shorts, and red socks. The club did however break from that tradition with the kits that they would wear away from home, beginning with a nearly all-black design, only accented with small amounts of white markings.

Club management worked for some time before the event to ensure that a new badge would meet three points which were seen as imperative, including: the need to contain the club colours (red and blue), the need to be easily recognisable, and the need to be unique by comparison to other clubs in the football world. A new badge for the club was unveiled on 2 August 2008 as the club held FC Vestsjælland Dagen (lit. 'FC West Zealand Day') within the city of Slagelse, with several hundred people in attendance. The badge was publicly revealed as it was unfurled from the top of a local Sparekassen Sjælland, one of the club's sponsors.

The final design was based on the club's regional and national location, where the Viking Age has a cultural historical role with the previously strategically placed military Viking castle, Trelleborg near Slagelse. The club logo consists of two basic elements: a triangular shield containing three vertical stripes in the club colours, and a stylised horned gold helmet with nose protection akin to helmets worn by vikings. With the abbreviation of "FCV" in white at the bottom, the crest is encircled by a white and black coloured edge, allowing it to distinguish itself from surrounding elements.

The club also continued with the trend in the form of their supporter group "Slagelse Red Vikings" and the club mascot known as "Hjalte", which frequently appeared at home games. Utilizing their parent club's motto of "the Team of the Region", the club badge and kits made their official debut in a match the following week on 9 August 2008 in a 2nd Division match against HIK.

== Kit and sponsoring ==
Kit manufacturer and sponsoring for FCV.

Period	Kit manufacturer	Shirt sponsor
2008–13	Nike	Harboes Bryggeri
2013–2015	Mitre	Harboes Bryggeri
2015	Legea	Harboes Bryggeri

=== First kit evolution ===
The club's colors are generated from the club's logo which are red and blue.

2012–13	2013–14	2014–15

== Staff ==
=== Management ===
- Director of Football: Jacob "Gaxe" Gregersen

=== Sports ===
- Goalkeeping Coach: Henrik Zarp
- Talent Manager U12 – U19: Jeppe Tengbjerg
- Head Coach U17: Mohammed Salem

=== Medical ===
- Mental Coach: Renè Nielsen

== Last squad ==
The squad given here is made up of the players registered to the club on the date of FC Vestsjælland's bankruptcy on 9 December 2015.

Note: Flags indicate national team as defined under FIFA eligibility rules; some limited exceptions apply. Players may hold more than one non-FIFA nationality.

No.	Pos.	Nation	Player
1	GK	DEN	Thomas Mikkelsen
3	DF	DEN	Morten Rasmussen
5	DF	DEN	Morten Bertolt
6	MF	DEN	Henrik Madsen (Captain)
7	DF	DEN	Peter Nymann
8	MF	DEN	Anders Due
9	FW	DEN	Yones Felfel
11	FW	DEN	Nikolaj Hansen
12	DF	DEN	Anders Randrup
13	DF	BEL	Jean-Claude Adrimer Bozga

No.	Pos.	Nation	Player
15	DF	DEN	Peter Jul Nielsen
17	MF	DEN	Mathias Hebo Rasmussen (on loan from FC Nordsjælland)
18	DF	DEN	Anders Kure (Vice-captain)
19	DF	DEN	Victor Wagner
20	DF	DEN	Marc Rochester Sørensen
21	FW	DEN	Frederik Christensen
22	DF	CIV	Yobou Jean Noël Thome
23	FW	DEN	Lee Rochester Sørensen
25	GK	ISL	Frederik Schram

== Managerial history ==
Name	Nationality	From	To	P	W	D	L	GF	GA	Win% (Note: Win percentage is rounded to two decimal places.)	Honours	Refs
Jeppe Tengbjerg	Denmark	1 July 2008 (Note: Tengbjerg became manager of Slagelse B&I on 25 January 2005, and continued the role upon creation of FC Vestsjælland. Matches prior to 1 July 2008 are not included.)	31 March 2009	19	12	3	4	51	21	63.16		
Michael Schjønberg	Denmark	1 April 2009	29 June 2011	61	27	17	17	115	105	44.26	1 Danish 2nd Division title	
Ove Pedersen	Denmark	1 July 2011	21 May 2014	96	36	33	27	122	112	37.50		
Michael Hansen	Denmark	22 May 2014	1 September 2015	47	15	9	23	58	71	31.91	1 Danish Cup runner-up	
Michael Hemmingsen	Denmark	1 September 2015	9 December 2015	13	2	4	7	13	19	15.38		
Total				236	92	66	78	359	328	38.98		

== Seasons ==
- Pld = Matches played
- W = Matches won
- D = Matches drawn
- L = Matches lost
- GF = Goals for
- GA = Goals against
- Pts = Points
- Pos = Final position
- SL = Danish Superliga
- 1D = Danish 1st Division
- 2D = Danish 2nd Division
- R2 = Round 2
- R3 = Round 3
- R4 = Round 4

Winners	Runners-up	Promoted	Relegated

Season	League									Danish Cup	Top scorer	Refs
Season	Division	P	W	D	L	GS	GA	Pts	Pos	Danish Cup	Top scorer	Refs
2008–09	2D ↑	30	19	8	3	80	31	65	1	R3	Rasmus Festersen (20)	
2009–10	1D	30	14	8	8	56	46	50	5	R2	Rasmus Festersen (10)	
2010–11	1D	26	10	12	8	58	57	42	7	R3	Rasmus Festersen (11)	
2011–12	1D	26	10	8	8	42	35	38	6	R3	Rasmus Festersen (6)	
2012–13	1D ↑	33	17	11	5	39	27	62	2	R3	Danni König (5)	
2013–14	SL	33	8	14	11	31	42	38	9	R4	Dennis Sørensen & Lasse Nielsen (5)	
2014–15	SL ↓	33	9	6	18	31	52	33	12	Finalist	Rasmus Festersen (10)	
2015–16	1D ↓	33	2	7	24	19	73	7 (Note: Deducted six points for financial irregularities.)	12 (Note: On 9 December 2015, the club was declared bankrupt and forced to withdraw from the league. All remaining games were forfeited as 0–3 losses.)	R3	Nikolaj Hansen (6)	

== Player of the season ==
- 2014–15: (Denmark) Rasmus Festersen

== Honours ==
- Danish Cup:
  - Runners-up (1): 2014–15

== Affiliated club(s) ==
The following club was affiliated with FC Vestsjælland:

- (India) Shillong Lajong (2012–2014)
