= Søren Henriksen (footballer) =

Danish footballer (born 1992)

Personal information
- Date of birth: 4 February 1992 (age 34)
- Place of birth: Farum, Denmark
- Height: 1.85 m (6 ft 1 in)
- Position: Centre-back

Youth career
- Nordsjælland

Senior career*
Years	Team	Apps	(Gls)
2011–2013	Nordsjælland	0	(0)
2013–2015	HB Køge	78	(2)
2015–2017	Vendsyssel	43	(2)
2017–2018	Helsingør	35	(0)
2018–2021	Vendsyssel	45	(1)

International career
2011–2012	Denmark U-20	5	(0)

Managerial career
- 2021–2023: Vendsyssel (sporting director)
- 2023–2025: Nordsjælland (ass. sporting director)
- * Club domestic league appearances and goals

Søren Henriksen (born 4 February 1992) is a Danish retired footballer.

== Career ==
=== Post retirement career ===
Following a playing career which included spells at FC Nordsjælland, HB Køge, FC Helsingør, and notably Vendsyssel FF, resulting in a total of 66 Superliga appearances and 168 appearances in the 1st Division, Henriksen retired in July 2021. At just 29 years old, he was subsequently appointed as the sporting director at Vendsyssel FF.

On 22 September 2023, Vendsyssel announced that Henriksen was stepping down as the club's sporting director. He instead joined FC Nordsjælland in a newly created role as assistant sporting director. He left Nordsjæland again at the end of August 2025.
