= Christoffer Østergaard =

Danish footballer (born 1993)

Personal information
- Full name: Christoffer Østergaard
- Date of birth: 22 May 1993 (age 33)
- Place of birth: Denmark
- Height: 1.83 m (6 ft 0 in)
- Position: Centre-back

Youth career
- Hobro

Senior career*
Years	Team	Apps	(Gls)
2013–2016	Hobro	19	(0)
2016	Brabrand		
2016–2020	Skive	98	(8)
2021	Brabrand	0	(0)
2021–2022	Hobro	11	(0)

Managerial career
- 2021: Brabrand IF (player-assistant)
- * Club domestic league appearances and goals as of 17:05, 26 May 2022 (UTC)

Christoffer Østergaard (born 22 May 1993) is a Danish retired footballer.

== Club career ==
=== Hobro IK ===
Hastrup got his debut for Hobro IK on 28 March 2013 against HB Køge in at match, which Hobro IK won 1–0. Østergaard was in the starting line-up.

Østergaard left Hobro on 31 January 2016 due to lack of playing time.

=== Brabrand IF ===
Just one day after his contract was terminated with Hobro, he signed with Danish 2nd Division side Brabrand IF.

=== Skive IK ===
On 17 July 2016 it was confirmed that Østergaard had signed a contract with Skive IK. He played his first game for Skive on 24 July 2016 against FC Fredericia. After a bad knee injury that would keep him out for a year, Østergaard left Skive in the summer 2020.

=== Brabrand IF ===
On 6 February 2021, Østergaard returned to Brabrand IF. Due to his knee injury, he was signed in a role as a player-assistant coach, so he could slowly recover from his long injury.

=== Return to Hobro ===
Østergaard trained with Hobro IK in the 2021-22 pre-season. On 29 July 2021, he signed a season-long deal with his childhood club, which he got his debut for back in 2013. On 21 May 2022 it was confirmed, that 29-year old Østergaard would retire at the end of the season.

== Private life ==
Østergaard went on Mariagerfjord Gymnasium from 2010 until 2013. According to the website of Hobro IK, Østergaard is fan of Manchester United, and his favourite player is David Beckham.
