= Jens Fønsskov Olsen =

Danish football manager (born 1975)

Personal information
- Birth name: Jens Fønsskov Olsen
- Date of birth: 30 May 1975 (age 51)
- Place of birth: Nykøbing Falster, Denmark

Team information
- Current team: Nordsjælland (head coach)

Senior career*
Years	Team	Apps	(Gls)
1993–1997	B 1921		
1997–1998	NFA	41	(4)
1998–1999	B 1921		

Managerial career
- 2004–2007: B 1921
- 2008: LFA
- 2014–2019: Nykøbing
- 2020–2023: Denmark U19
- 2024–: Nordsjælland
- * Club domestic league appearances and goals

Jens Fønsskov Olsen (born 30 May 1975) is a Danish professional football manager and former player who is head coach of FC Nordsjælland in the Danish Superliga. A defender in his playing days, he spent his senior career with NFA in the Danish 2nd Division before moving into coaching in 1999.

== Playing career ==
Olsen progressed through NFA's youth system and appeared for the first team in the Danish 2nd Division during the mid‑1990s.

== Managerial career ==
Olsen began coaching at NFA in 1999 and, five years later, took charge of the reserve side, B 1921.

In January 2008 he was appointed manager of LFA in the Danish 1st Division. He resigned in May after the club appointed an additional assistant against his wishes.

Following youth‑development roles at Lyngby and Nykøbing FC, Olsen returned to Nykøbing in June 2014 as first‑team head coach. He led the club for five seasons before stepping down at the end of 2018–19.

In May 2020 he was appointed head coach of the Denmark under‑19s, overseeing the 2003 and 2004 age groups.

Olsen became assistant to head coach Johannes Hoff Thorup at FC Nordsjælland in June 2023. He succeeded Thorup as manager on 24 June 2024 after Thorup joined Norwich City. In his first campaign Nordsjælland finished fifth in the Superliga regular season and reached the championship round with the division's best defensive record.

== Managerial statistics ==
As of match played 22 November 2026

Managerial record by team and tenure
Team	From	To	Record				
Team	From	To	P	W	D	L	Win %
Nykøbing FC	1 July 2014	30 June 2019	71	24	21	26	33.80
Denmark U19	1 August 2020	30 June 2023	20	14	4	2	70.00
Nordsjælland	1 July 2024	present	96	46	19	31	47.92
Total			187	84	44	59	44.92
