= Lars Pleidrup =

Danish footballer (born 1981)

Personal information
- Date of birth: 13 August 1981 (age 45)
- Place of birth: Væggerløse, Denmark
- Height: 1.78 m (5 ft 10 in)
- Position: Midfielder

Youth career
- IVI
- B.1921

Senior career*
Years	Team	Apps	(Gls)
2000–2006	Lolland Falster Alliancen	166	(41)
2006–2010	AGF	80	(6)
2010–2014	Vestsjælland	93	(5)
2014–2023	Nykøbing	278	(35)
- * Club domestic league appearances and goals

Lars Pleidrup (born 13 August 1981) is a Danish retired professional footballer who played as a midfielder. Due to his powerful shot from distance, he was given the nickname Krydsermissilet fra Væggerløse ("the cruise missile from Væggerløse") throughout his career and later Legende-Lars ("Lars the legend").
