= Nykøbing Falster Idrætspark =

Football stadium in Denmark

Lollands Bank Park
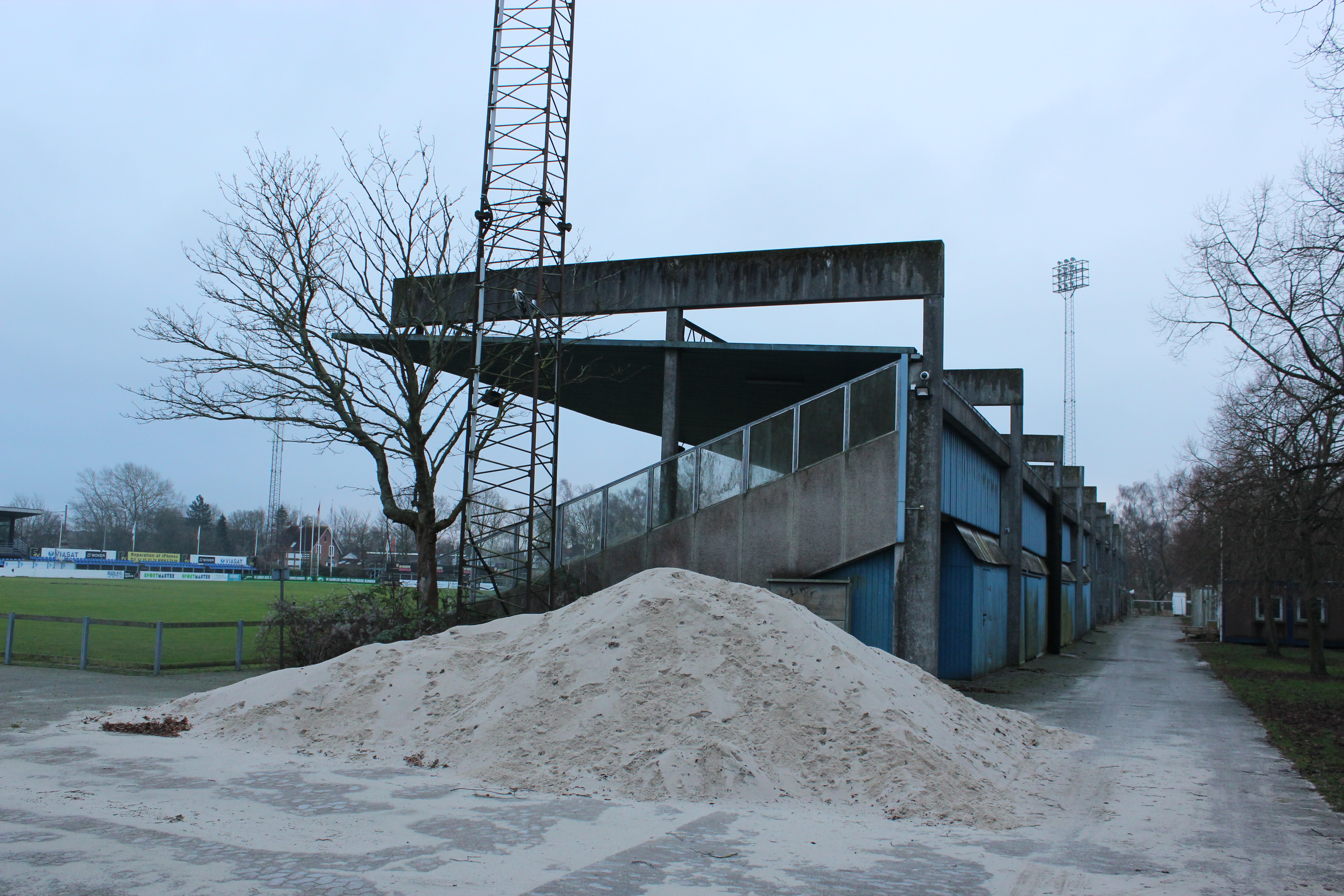

- Location of the stadium
- Full name: Nykøbing Falster Idrætspark
- Location: Nykøbing Falster, Denmark
- Coordinates: 54°46′20.9″N 11°52′31.2″E
- Capacity: 10,000 (2,000 seated)
- Surface: Grass
- Record attendance: 10,689
- Field size: 110 m x 70 m

Tenant
- Nykøbing FC

Nykøbing Falster Idrætspark is a football stadium in Nykøbing Falster. It is the home stadium of Danish 1st Division club Nykøbing FC. The stadium has a total capacity of 10,000, of which 2,000 is seated. For sponsorship reasons, the stadium was known as Scandic Live Arena between 21 September 2008 and 31 December 2011, Telenor Arena between 10 July 2012 and 31 July 2014, Enelco Arena between 31 August 2014 and 31 December 2016 and as CM Arena between 6 March 2018 and 2 June 2021. On 3 June 2021, a sponsorship agreement with Lollands Bank was announced, changing the name to Lollands Bank Park effectively immediately.
