= René Skovdahl =

Danish football manager (born 1970)

Personal information
- Date of birth: 2 February 1970 (age 56)
- Place of birth: Copenhagen, Denmark

Team information
- Current team: Helsingør (manager)

Managerial career
- Years: Team
- 2004–2011: Brøndby (assistant)
- 2011: Brøndby (scout)
- 2012–2013: Molde (assistant)
- 2014: Cardiff City (coach)
- 2015: Hønefoss (assistant)
- 2016: Hønefoss
- 2016–2017: Maccabi Haifa (assistant)
- 2017: Roskilde
- 2019–2024: Brattvåg
- 2024–2025: Næstved
- 2026–: Helsingør

René Skovdahl (born 2 February 1970) is a Danish association football manager.

He is a son of Ebbe Skovdahl. René Skovdahl was a physical trainer and assistant manager with responsibility of physical training in Brøndby IF. In the summer of 2011 he signed a pre-deal with a foreign club, and was moved to a scouting position at Brøndby. The foreign club turned out to be Molde FK, managed by Ole Gunnar Solskjær. After the 2013 season, Solskjær became manager of Cardiff City F.C., and signed Skovdahl as coach in January 2014 with responsibility for physical training and analysis. Solskjær and his team were sacked in September 2014. Skovdahl moved back to Norway in 2015 as assistant manager of Hønefoss BK. After the club was relegated, Skovdahl was promoted to manager in 2016. In August 2016 he was bough out of this contract to become assistant manager of Maccabi Haifa, under manager René Meulensteen, another colleague from Cardiff.

In the summer of 2017, Skovdahl was named as the new manager of FC Roskilde, but he was sacked after only two months. He went to Norway for the third time in 2019, taking over Brattvåg IL.

In July 2024, Skovdahl left Bratvåg in order to become new manager of Danish 2nd Division club Næstved Boldklub. On 14 April 2025, Skovdahl decided to resign from the position.

In April 2026 he succeeded Christian Iversen as manager of FC Helsingør.
