= Nykøbing FC =

Danish football club

- Full name: Nykøbing Football Club
- Nicknames: Alliancen (The Alliance) (between 1994 and 2013)
- Short name: NFC
- Founded: 1 July 2013; 13 years ago
- Ground: Lollands Bank Park, Nykøbing Falster
- Capacity: 10,000 (2,000 seated)
- Chairman: Rene Fjeldsøe Sørensen
- Manager: Mikkel Thygesen
- League: Danish 2nd Division
- 2025–26: Danish 3rd Division, 1st of 12 (promoted)
- Website: https://nykobingfc.com/
| Home colours | Away colours |

Nykøbing FC is a Danish professional association football club based in Nykøbing Falster on Falster. The club competes in Danish 2nd Division, the third tier of the Danish football league system, and plays its home games at the Lollands Bank Park.

== History ==
=== Mergers (1994–2013) ===
Nykøbing FC was formed on 1 July 2013 by a merger of regional teams B.1901 and B.1921. The move was initiated with the goal of developing youth football in Guldborgsund Kommune in order to strengthen the first team and thereby retain divisional status. Before taking the name Nykøbing FC, the club was known as Nykøbing Falster Alliancen (NFA), which was also a superstructure between B.1901 and B.1921 founded on 1 January 1994. Later on, between 2006 and 2013, this club also went under the name Lolland Falster Alliancen (LFA).

Lolland Falster Alliancen had, before the foundation of Nykøbing FC, had a tumultuous existence between the second tier and third tier. On 18 June 2006, their 4–3 defeat to Lyngby Boldklub in the last game of the season resulted in relegation to the third tier, after having spent three years in the second tier. However, they spent just one season at this level, and were promoted back to the second division after beating KB 5–0 on 3 June 2007.

=== Superliga 2020 and 2030 strategy (2015–present) ===
In 2015, two years after the merger of B.1901 and B.1921 to form Nykøbing FC, the club launched the Superliga 2020 project with the stated aim of securing promotion to the Danish Superliga by 2020. The initiative coincided with investment from several prominent figures, including chef Claus Meyer, comedian Mick Øgendahl, and former Danish international Claus Jensen, who became major shareholders.

The original plan was revised in 2019, shifting the target to promotion by 2022 while aiming to field a squad composed of at least 50% homegrown players. On 7 January 2020, Claus Jensen expanded his role at the club by taking over as club manager, while Brian Rasmussen became first-team coach.

Nykøbing gained national attention in September 2021 after defeating top-flight side FC Copenhagen 3–0 in the third round of the Danish Cup, widely regarded as a major upset.

In January 2025, Nykøbing appointed former Danish international Mikkel Thygesen as head coach, succeeding Claus Jensen following Thygesen's tenure at Roskilde. Despite the managerial change, the club continued to struggle in the 2024–25 Danish 2nd Division, finishing 12th in the regular season and entering the relegation round.

Amid the relegation battle, the club unveiled its "2030 Strategy" in April 2025—a long-term plan focused on building a sustainable and competitive foundation. The initiative outlines goals in areas such as sporting performance, financial stability, youth development, community engagement, and international collaboration. As part of the strategy, Nykøbing launched a public share offering to attract local investment, with chairman Rasmus Nagel highlighting the role of regional ownership in preserving the club's identity. The team was afterwards relegated, when they finished last in the relegation table.

== Season to season ==
| Season | Tier | Division | Place | Danish Cup |
|---|---|---|---|---|
| 2013–14 | 3 | 3 | 9th | Third round |
| 2014–15 | 3 | 3 | 5th | Second round |
| 2015–16 | 3 | 3 | 3rd | First round |
| 2016–17 | 2 | 2 | 7th | Second round |
| 2017–18 | 2 | 2 | 8th | Second round |
| 2018–19 | 2 | 2 | 8th | Third round |
| 2019–20 | 2 | 2 | 10th | Third round |
| 2020–21 | 3 | 3 | Group 2,1st | Fourth round |
| 2021–22 | 2 | 2 | 6th | Fourth round |
| 2022–23 | 2 | 2 | 12th | Fourth round |
| 2023–24 | 3 | 3 | 6th | Third round |
| 2024–25 | 3 | 3 | 12th | Second round |
| 2025–26 | 4 | 4 | | First round |

- 6 seasons in Danish 1st Division
- 6 seasons in Danish 2nd Division
- 1 season in Danish 3rd Division

== Honours ==
- Danish Cup:
  - Runners-up (2): 1972–73, 1982–83 (as B.1901)
- Danish 3rd Division:
  - Winner (1): 2025–26

== Current squad ==
As of 6 September 2026

Note: Flags indicate national team as defined under FIFA eligibility rules; some limited exceptions apply. Players may hold more than one non-FIFA nationality.

| No. | Pos. | Nation | Player |
|---|---|---|---|
| 1 | GK | DEN | Jeppe Rasmussen |
| 3 | DF | DEN | Kasper Jensen |
| 4 | DF | DEN | Mathias Brems |
| 5 | DF | DEN | Peter Ullum |
| 7 | MF | DEN | Lucas Nyman |
| 8 | MF | USA | Rory O'Driscoll |
| 9 | FW | DEN | Mikkel Dahl |
| 10 | FW | DEN | Ole Jakobsen |
| 11 | FW | DEN | Benjamin Kold |
| 12 | DF | DEN | Oliver Svendsen |
| 15 | DF | DEN | Mathis Konradsen (on loan from Midtjylland) |
| 16 | FW | NGR | Emmanuel Ogude |

| No. | Pos. | Nation | Player |
|---|---|---|---|
| 17 | FW | KOS | Albert Rrahmani (on loan from Sønderjyske) |
| 18 | MF | DEN | Milas Frederiksen |
| 19 | DF | DEN | Noah Sekula |
| 22 | FW | DEN | Marcus Rasmussen |
| 23 | DF | DEN | Oskar Gärtig |
| 26 | GK | DEN | Valde Skov |
| 27 | DF | DEN | Oskar Balsløv |
| 28 | FW | DEN | Magnus Bøttker |
| 29 | MF | DEN | William Hansen |
| 30 | FW | DEN | Jeppe Karlsson |
| 31 | GK | DEN | Jeppe Rømer |

=== Youth players in use 2026–27 ===
Note: Flags indicate national team as defined under FIFA eligibility rules; some limited exceptions apply. Players may hold more than one non-FIFA nationality.

| No. | Pos. | Nation | Player |

=== Current technical staff ===
| Position | Staff |
|---|---|
| Manager | (Denmark) Mikkel Thygesen |
| Assistant manager | (England) (Australia) Sam Rafique |
| Assistant manager | (Denmark) Joachim Wagner |
| Physical coach | (Denmark) Thomas ’TC’ Christensen |
| Goalkeeping coach | (Denmark) Tobias Brogaard |
| Team manager | (Denmark) Jeanette Friis |
| Physiotherapist | (Denmark) Emil Ringtved |
| Physiotherapist | (Denmark) Mikkel Stage Clausen |

Last updated: February 2020
Source: Nykøbing FC

== Stadium ==
Nykøbing FC play its home matches at the Nykøbing Falster Idrætspark named CM Arena for sponsorship reasons. It has a capacity of approximately 10,000 and was inaugurated in 1987.

== Famous players ==
Note: this list includes players that have appeared in at least 100 league games and/or have reached international status.

- (Canada) Jordan Wilson
- (Denmark) Lars Pleidrup
- (Denmark) Kasper Jensen
- (Denmark) Søren Christensen
- (Denmark) Anders Due
- (Denmark) Jonas Kamper
- (Denmark) Esben Hansen
- (Denmark) Kim Christensen

== Coaches ==
Nykøbing Falster Alliancen

- (Denmark) Finn Petersen (1994–96), (1998–99)
- (Denmark) Jan Øster (1996)
- (Denmark) Peter Bonde (1997–98)
- (Denmark) Jesper "Købmand" Pedersen (2000)
- (Denmark) Carsten Broe (2000–06)

Lolland-Falster Alliancen

- (Denmark) Tom Nielsen (2006–07)
- (Denmark) Jens Olsen (2008)
- (Denmark) Per Berg Larsen (2008), (2008)
- (Denmark) Jesper Hansen (2008)
- (Denmark) Jesper Tollefsen (2009–11)
- (Denmark) Jeppe Tengbjerg (2011–13)
- (Denmark) Jan Jacobsen (2013–14)

Nykøbing FC

- (Denmark) Jens Olsen (2014–19)
- (Denmark) Brian Rasmussen (2019–20)
- (Denmark) Claus Jensen (2020–25)
- (Denmark) Mikkel Thygesen (2025–present)
