= FC Helsingør =

Danish football club

Helsingør
- Full name: FC Helsingør
- Short name: FCH
- Founded: 1 August 2005; 21 years ago
- Ground: Helsingør Stadium
- Capacity: 4,500
- Owner: NSN
- Chairman: Ion Bilbao
- Manager: René Skovdahl
- League: Danish 3rd Division
- 2025–26: Danish 2nd Division, 12th of 12 (relegated)
- Website: fchelsingor.dk
Home colours	Away colours	Third colours

FC Helsingør is a Danish professional football club based in Helsingør. The club plays in the Danish 3rd Division, the fourth tier of the Danish football league system.

== History ==
Logo of the club 2005–2012

Logo of the club 2012–2020

The club was formed on 1 August 2005 when the five Elsinore clubs Helsingør IF, Helsingør FC, Frem Hellebæk IF, Vapnagaard FK72 and Snekkersten IF merged under the name Elite 3000 Fodbold. In 2012, the club changed its name to FC Helsingør. The club plays at Helsingør Stadion. The club moved to the new Helsingør Stadion in the summer of 2019.

On 4 July 2020, FC Helsingør won the Danish 2nd Division, and clinched promotion back to the Danish 1st Division for the 2020–21 season.

FC Helsingør finished the 2020–21 season in 4th place with a record of 16 wins, 11 losses, 5 ties.

FC Helsingør finished the 2021–22 season again in 4th place, with an improved record of 16 wins, 9 losses, 7 ties.

== Staff ==
Owner / Director

- (Spain) Ion Bilbao

Head Coach

- (Denmark) René Skovdahl

Assistant Coach

- (Denmark) Oliver Drost

Assistant Coach

- (Denmark) Morten Mundus

Goalkeeper Coach

- (France) Marc-Antoine Madelaine

== Players ==
=== Current squad ===
As of 10 September 2026

Note: Flags indicate national team as defined under FIFA eligibility rules; some limited exceptions apply. Players may hold more than one non-FIFA nationality.

No.	Pos.	Nation	Player
1	GK	DEN	Alexander Hasmark Jensen
2	DF	DEN	Frederik Karlsen
3	DF	DEN	Nikolaj Bagger
4	DF	SOM	Ilias Hassan
5	MF	DEN	Bror Blume
6	DF	DEN	Nichlas Vesterbæk
7	DF	DEN	Marc Winkel
8	MF	DEN	Mathias Kisum
9	FW	DEN	Jacob Hjorth
10	FW	FRA	Yohji Koré
11	FW	DEN	Alexander Petræus
12	MF	DEN	Frederik Winding
13	GK	DEN	Eliot Guindy
14	DF	DEN	Mikka Heller

No.	Pos.	Nation	Player
15	DF	DEN	Sebastian Laustsen
17	FW	DEN	Rasmus Sjøholm
18	MF	DEN	Tobias Nielsen
19	FW	DEN	Ramesh Delsouz
20	DF	DEN	Oliver Hald
21	MF	DEN	Sigurd Ulriksen
22	MF	DEN	Gustav Johansen
23	MF	DEN	Marc Birkelund
24	DF	DEN	Frederik Simonsen
26	DF	DEN	Malik El-Beltagi
27	DF	DEN	Elias Rørsted
28	MF	DEN	Amin Peyman
29	FW	DEN	Lucas Borén
30	GK	DEN	Frederik Enggaard

=== Youth players in use 2026-27 ===
Note: Flags indicate national team as defined under FIFA eligibility rules; some limited exceptions apply. Players may hold more than one non-FIFA nationality.

No.	Pos.	Nation	Player

=== Out on loan ===
Note: Flags indicate national team as defined under FIFA eligibility rules; some limited exceptions apply. Players may hold more than one non-FIFA nationality.

No.	Pos.	Nation	Player
