= List of foreign Danish Superliga players =

This is a list of foreign players in the Danish Superliga, which commenced play in 1991.

The following players meet both of the following two criteria:

1. Have played at least one Superliga game. Players who were signed by Superliga clubs, but only played in lower league, cup and/or European games, or did not play in any competitive games at all, are not included.
2. Are considered foreign, i.e., outside Denmark. A player is considered foreign if he is not eligible to play for the national teams of Denmark.

Clubs listed are those that the player has played at least one Superliga game for. Seasons listed are those that the player has played at least one Superliga game in. Note that seasons, not calendar years, are used. For example, "1992–95" indicates that the player has played in every season from 1992–93 to 1994–95, but not necessarily every calendar year from 1992 to 1995. Included in parentheses are also the number of games and goals in each series of years.

In bold: players that have played at least one Superliga game in the current 2025–26 season, and the clubs they have played for. They include players that have subsequently left the club, but do not include current players of a Superliga club that have not played a Superliga game in the current season.

Last updated 7 October 2025

== Africa (CAF) ==
=== Algeria ===
- Amin Chiakha – FCK, Vejle BK – 2024–25 (17/2), 2025–26 (14/2)
- Mehdi Guerrouad – Viborg FF – 2003–05 (4/0)
- Adda Djeziri – Vejle BK, HB Køge – 2008–09 (6/0), 2011–12 (4/0)

=== Angola ===
- Nando Rafael – AGF – 2008–10 (33/10)
- Igor Vetokele – FCK – 2012–14 (44/16)

=== Benin ===
- **Yamirou Ouorou** – **AC Horsens** – 2026– (1/0)

=== Botswana ===
- Dipsy Selolwane – Vejle BK – 2001–02 (5/0)

=== Burkina Faso ===
- **Souleymane Alio** – **FC Nordsjælland** – 2025– (2/0)
- Oumar Barro – Brøndby IF – 1999–2002 (19/3)
- Ibrahim Gnanou – FC Midtjylland – 2007–08 (1/0)
- Adama Guira – SønderjyskE, AGF – 2013–17 (96/3) 2020–21 (4/0), 2017–19 (51/0)
- Adamo Nagalo – FC Nordsjælland – 2020–25 (93/3)
- **Ismahila Ouédraogo** – **Odense BK** – 2025– (25/1)

=== Burundi ===
- Parfait Bizoza – Lyngby BK – 2022–24 (11/0)

=== Cameroon ===
- Christian Bassogog – AaB – 2015–17 (30/4)
- Pierre Boya – Randers FC 2012–13 (15/2)
- Emile Chambo – Lyngby BK – 2023–24 (1/0)
- Ivan Djantou – SønderjyskE – 2024–26 (31/4)
- Eric Djemba-Djemba – Odense BK – 2008–12 (102/3)
- Joseph Elanga – Brøndby IF, AC Horsens, Brøndby IF – 2005–07 (20/1), 2007–09 (32/1), 2008–09 (3/0)
- Patrice Kwedi – AGF – 2004–05 (8/0)
- Victor Mpindi – SønderjyskE – 2017–22 (88/2)
- Faris Moumbagna – SønderjyskE – 2021–22 (10/0)
- Cédric N'Koum – Odense BK – 2012–14 (22/1)
- Duplexe Tchamba – SønderjyskE – 2021–22 (26/2)
- Alphonse Tchami – Odense BK – 1992–95 (65/28)
- Bertrand Tchami – Odense BK – 1996–97 (2/0)
- Joel Tchami – AC Horsens – 2005–07 (8/1)
- Bernard Tchoutang – Viborg FF – 2003–04 (5/0)
- William Tchuameni – SønderjyskE – 2017–19 (12/0)
- **Geovanni Vianney** – **FCK** – 2025– (10/2)

=== Cape Verde ===
- Serginho – Viborg FF – 2023–25 (55/7)

=== Congo ===
- Vladis-Emmerson Illoy-Ayyet – Vejle BK – 2018–19 (11/0)

=== DR Congo ===
- Anthony D'Alberto – AGF – 2021–23 (31/0)
- Yeni Ngbakoto – Vejle BK – 2023–25 (38/3)
- Joël Tshibamba – FC Vestsjælland – 2013–15 (11/1)

=== Egypt ===
- **Ibrahim Adel** – **FC Nordsjælland** – 2025– (11/3)
- Emam Ashour – FC Midtjylland – 2022–23 (5/1)
- Alexander Jakobsen – Viborg FF – 2016–17 (10/1)
- Mohamed Zidan – AB, FC Midtjylland – 2000–03 (51/12), 2003–05 (47/30)

=== Equatorial Guinea ===
- **Dorian Hanza** – **Viborg FF** – 2025– (30/3)

=== Eritrea ===
- Mohammed Saeid – Lyngby BK – 2017–18 (5/0)

=== Gambia ===
- Hamza Barry – Vejle BK – 2023–25 (52/2)
- **Yaya Bojang** – **Odense BK** – 2025– (27/0)
- Aziz Corr – Fremad Amager, Hvidovre IF – 1994–95 (17/1), 1996–97 (2/0)
- Njogu Demba-Nyrén – Esbjerg fB, Odense BK – 2005–08 (61/21) 2011–13 (12/0), 2008–11 (53/12)
- **James Gomez** – AC Horsens, **Odense BK** – 2019–21 (16/1) 2022–23 (28/1), 2023–24 (12/0) 2025– (12/1)
- Tijan Jaiteh – Randers FC – 2010–11 (13/0)
- Ousman Jallow – Brøndby IF – 2008–11 (70/14)
- Alassana Jatta – Viborg FF – 2021–24 (60/6)
- Paul Jatta – Brøndby IF – 2009–11 (19/0)
- Musa Juwara – Vejle BK – 2023–25 (60/7)
- Alasana Manneh – Odense BK – 2022–24 (39/3)
- Foday Manneh – Vejle BK – 2021–22 (1/0)
- Yankuba Minteh – Odense BK – 2022–23 (17/4)
- Simon Richter – FC Nordsjælland, HB Køge – 2004–06 (22/0) 2007–09 (21/1), 2011–12 (19/1)
- **Alagie Saine** – **AC Horsens** – 2026– (1/0)
- Bubacarr Sanneh – AC Horsens, FC Midtjylland, AGF, Silkeborg IF – 2016–18 (47/8), 2017–19 (16/3), 2020–21 (8/0), 2021–22 (8/0)
- Ebrima Sowe – Herfølge BK – 2004–05 (22/3)
- **Bubacarr Tambedou** – **SønderjyskE** – 2026– (1/0)

=== Ghana ===
- **Malik Abubakari** – Viborg FF, **Lyngby BK** – 2023–24 (13/2), 2024–25 (17/0) 2026– (1/0)
- **Stephen Acquah** – **FC Nordsjælland** – 2024– (22/2)
- David Addy – Randers FC – 2008–10 (20/0)
- Enoch Kofi Adu – FC Nordsjælland – 2010–13 (79/0)
- Ernest Agyiri – Randers FC – 2023–25 (22/1)
- Issah Gabriel Ahmed – Randers FC – 2006–11 (71/4)
- Charles Akonnor – AC Horsens – 2005–07 (53/6)
- Michael Akoto – AGF – 2023–25 (19/0)
- Daniel Amartey – FCK – 2014–16 (44/3)
- **Prince Amoako** – **FC Nordsjælland** – 2025– (31/8)
- Clinton Antwi – FC Nordsjælland – 2018–20 (19/0)
- Ernest Asante – FC Nordsjælland – 2016–18 (66/21)
- Isaac Atanga – FC Nordsjælland – 2018–21 (55/11)
- Godwin Attram – Silkeborg IF – 1999–2001 (31/5)
- Michael Baidoo – FC Midtjylland – 2017–18 (1/0)
- **John Batigi** – **AC Horsens** – 2026– (1/0)
- **David Boison** – **SønderjyskE** – 2026– (1/0)
- Mohammed Dauda – Esbjerg fB – 2019–20 (22/4)
- Francis Dickoh – FC Nordsjælland, FC Midtjylland, SønderjyskE – 2003–06 (103/6), 2013–16 (24/0), 2015–16 (5/1)
- Godsway Donyoh – FC Nordsjælland – 2015–20 (76/26)
- Raphael Dwamena – Vejle BK – 2020–21 (5/2)
- Davidson Eden – Esbjerg fB – 2010–11 (5/0) 2012–14 (17/0)
- Bismark Edjeodji – Vejle BK – 2025–26 (24/1)
- **Cyril Edudzi** – **Randers FC** – 2025– (8/2)
- Abu Francis – FC Nordsjælland – 2019–22 (55/8)
- Mohammed Fuseini – Randers FC – 2023–24 (16/9)
- Richmond Gyamfi – AGF – 2024–25 (4/0)
- Kamal Issah – FC Nordsjælland – 2012–14 (5/0)
- Mohammed Kudus – FC Nordsjælland – 2018–20 (51/14)
- Willy Kumado – FC Nordsjælland, Lyngby BK – 2021–22 (2/0), 2022–25 (53/0)
- Jones Kusi-Asare – Esbjerg fB – 2008–10 (9/0)
- Adam Kwarasey – Brøndby IF – 2016–17 (2/0)
- Joseph Mensah – AC Horsens – 2016–18 (19/1)
- Araphat Mohammed – FC Nordsjælland – 2024–25 (6/0)
- **Abdul Moro** – **AC Horsens** – 2026– (1/0)
- Ibrahim Moro – Silkeborg IF – 2016–18 (52/1)
- Abdul Mumin – FC Nordsjælland – 2016–17 (3/0) 2018–20 (40/1)
- Baba Musa – FC Midtjylland – 2001–02 (2/0)
- Divine Naah – FC Nordsjælland – 2016–17 (5/0)
- Prince Nana – AB – 2003–04 (1/0)
- Ernest Nuamah – FC Nordsjælland – 2021–24 (43/17)
- Dominic Oduro – AGF, FC Nordsjælland – 2013–14 (10/0), 2015–17 (2/0)
- Ebenezer Ofori – Vejle BK – 2021–22 (14/0) 2023–25 (22/0)
- Emmanuel Ogura – FC Nordsjælland – 2021–22 (7/0)
- Jerome Opoku – Vejle BK – 2021–22 (20/0)
- Ibrahim Osman – FC Nordsjælland – 2022–24 (35/6)
- Emmanuel Oti – Esbjerg fB – 2016–17 (4/0) 2018–19 (24/0)
- Enock Otoo – Lyngby BK – 2023–25 (5/0)
- Razak Pimpong – FC Midtjylland, FCK – 2000–06 (124/22), 2005–07 (21/0)
- Kwadwo Poku – FC Midtjylland – 2004–06 (22/2)
- Ibrahim Sadiq – FC Nordsjælland – 2018–22 (59/6)
- Razak Salifu – AGF – 2007–09 (6/0)
- Ibrahim Salou – Vejle BK – 2008–09 (6/2)
- **Issaka Seidu** – **FC Nordsjælland** – 2025– (5/0)
- **Abdul Hakim Sulemana** – **Randers FC** – 2024– (9/0)
- Kamaldeen Sulemana – FC Nordsjælland – 2019–21 (42/14)
- Charles Takyi – AC Horsens – 2012–13 (11/2)
- Collins Tanor – FC Nordsjælland, Hobro IK – 2015–18 (9/0), 2018–19 (2/0)
- Nana Welbeck – Odense BK – 2016–18 (15/0)
- Maxwell Woledzi – FC Nordsjælland – 2019–22 (28/1)
- Emmanuel Yeboah – Brøndby IF, Vejle BK – 2023–25 (6/2), 2024–25 (9/0)
- **Caleb Yirenkyi** – **FC Nordsjælland** – 2024– (47/4)

=== Guinea ===
- Abdoulaye Camara – Vejle BK – 2025–26 (19/1)
- Mohammed Diarra – Odense BK – 2012–16 (44/0)
- **Mohamed Cherif Haidara** – **SønderjyskE** – 2024– (44/5)
- Sory Kaba – FC Midtjylland – 2019–21 (57/18) 2022–24 (20/2)

=== Guinea-Bissau ===
- **Franculino Djú** – **FC Midtjylland** – 2023– (76/39)
- Edigeison Gomes – Esbjerg fB – 2014–15 (13/1)
- Francisco Júnior – Vendsyssel FF – 2018–19 (10/0)

=== Ivory Coast ===
- Simon Adingra – FC Nordsjælland – 2020–22 (38/11)
- Yannick Agnero – FC Nordsjælland – 2021–22 (3/0)
- **Djé Beni** – **FC Midtjylland** – 2026– (1/0)
- **Lasso Coulibaly** – FC Nordsjælland, Randers FC, **Viborg FF** – 2021–24 (45/2), 2023–24 (26/4), 2026– (2/0)
- Mamadou Coulibaly – FC Nordsjælland – 2004–05 (4/0)
- Serges Déblé – Viborg FF – 2015–17 (51/10)
- Evaristo Dibo – Vejle BK – 1995–96 (5/0)
- Yao Dieudonne – Odense BK – 2015–17 (19/0) 2018–19 (2/0)
- Mohamed Diomande – FC Nordsjælland – 2019–24 (96/11)
- Mario Dorgeles – FC Nordsjælland – 2022–25 (68/3)
- Adama Fofana – Vejle BK – 2020–22 (3/0)
- Aboubakar Keita – FCK – 2015–17 (4/0)
- Tiémoko Konaté – Vendsyssel FF – 2018–19 (12/1)
- Chris Kouakou – FC Midtjylland – 2022–23 (1/0)
- Raoul Kouakou – Viborg FF – 2006–07 (8/1)
- Sayouba Mandé – Odense BK – 2019–21 (9/0)
- **Levy Nene** – **FC Nordsjælland** – 2024– (39/8)
- Jean Thome – FC Vestsjælland – 2014–15 (5/0)

=== Kenya ===
- Emmanuel Ake – AB, FC Nordsjælland, Herfølge BK, Lyngby Boldklub – 2000–04 (46/3), 2004–06 (14/0), 2009–10 (13/5), 2010–11 (1/0)
- **Daniel Anyembe** – Esbjerg fB, **Viborg FF** – 2016–17 (1/0) 2018–20 (55/1), 2021– (129/3)
- George Odhiambo – Randers FC – 2010–11 (1/0)

=== Liberia ===
- Dioh Williams – AGF – 2007–10 (62/12)

=== Madagascar ===
- **Warren Caddy** – **Randers FC** – 2025– (12/2)

=== Malawi ===
- Joseph Kamwendo – FC Nordsjælland – 2005–07 (17/4)

=== Mali ===
- **Amady Camara** – **Randers FC** – 2026– (2/0)
- **Mouhammade Camara** – **AGF** – 2026– (1/0)
- Adama Tamboura – Randers FC, Hobro IK – 2012–15 (70/0), 2015–16 (8/0)
- Kalilou Traoré – Odense BK – 2010–12 (51/8)

=== Morocco ===
- Bouabid Bouden – Odense BK – 2005–06 (15/2)
- Ryan Mmaee – AGF – 2018–19 (9/0)
- **Amir Richardson** – **FCK** – 2025– (4/0)
- Adnane Tighadouini – Esbjerg fB – 2018–19 (17/4)
- Karim Zaza – FCK, Odense BK, Brøndby IF, AaB – 1995–2000 (80/0), 2000–03 (79/0), 2003–06 (49/0), 2007–11 (100/0)

=== Niger ===
- Moussa Maâzou – Randers FC – 2015–16 (10/1)
- Issah Salou – Randers FC – 2019–20 (1/0)

=== Nigeria ===
- Fanendo Adi – FCK – 2013–14 (9/3)
- Rabiu Afolabi – SønderjyskE – 2012–13 (5/0)
- Akeem Agbetu – FC Midtjylland – 2005–07 (8/2)
- Oluwafemi Ajilore – FC Midtjylland, Brøndby IF – 2004–08 (76/4) 2013–14 (2/0), 2011–12 (17/0)
- Oke Akpoveta – Brøndby IF – 2011–13 (20/0)
- Akinkunmi Amoo – FCK – 2021–23 (4/1)
- Musefiu Ashiru – FC Midtjylland – 2013–14 (3/0)
- Bosun Ayeni – Lyngby BK, BK Frem, FC Nordsjælland, AC Horsens – 1998–2002 (35/1), 2003–04 (18/1), 2004–07 (55/0), 2007–08 (3/0)
- Ibrahim Babatunde – AC Horsens – 2007–08 (6/0)
- Baba Collins – FC Midtjylland, Vejle BK – 2007–12 (59/11), 2008–09 (12/2)
- Babajide David – FC Midtjylland – 2015–16 (1/0)
- **Emmanuel Dennis** – **Brøndby IF** – 2025– (11/1)
- **Ebube Duru** – **SønderjyskE** – 2024– (40/1)
- Edafe Egbedi – AGF – 2011–14 (7/0)
- **Kelvin Ehibhatiomhan** – **AC Horsens** – 2026– (2/1)
- Friday Elahor – Brøndby IF – 1991–92 (12/0)
- Justice John Erhenede – Vejle BK – 2006–07 (12/0)
- **Friday Etim** – **FC Midtjylland**, FC Fredericia – 2025– (2/0), 2025–26 (14/5)
- Emeka Ezeugo – Lyngby BK, BK Frem, AaB, Fremad Amager – 1991–93 (31/2), 1992–93 (3/0), 1992–94 (14/3), 1994–95 (4/0)
- Ahmed Garba – AB – 2003–04 (12/4)
- Alhaji Gero – Viborg FF – 2015–16 (8/0)
- Rilwan Hassan – FC Midtjylland, SønderjyskE – 2009–19 (223/23), 2019–22 (74/4)
- Sylvester Igboun – FC Midtjylland – 2009–15 (147/41)
- **Stanley Iheanacho** – **FC Midtjylland** – 2026– (1/0)
- Peter Ijeh – FCK – 2005–06 (16/4)
- Mustapha Isah – Randers FC – 2022–24 (7/0)
- Samson Iyede – AC Horsens – 2022–23 (18/0)
- Tosin Kehinde – Randers FC – 2019–23 (97/9)
- Mojo Kingsley – Viborg FF – 2004–05 (2/0)
- Adeshina Lawal – Vejle BK – 2006–07 (11/2), 2008–09 (12/1)
- Ayinde Lawal – FC Midtjylland – 2006–08 (3/0)
- Kingsley Madu – Odense BK – 2019–20 (1/0)
- Paul Mukairu – FCK – 2021–23 (20/0)
- Christian Muomaife – Viborg FF – 2006–08 (36/8)
- Jamiu Musbaudeen – FC Midtjylland – 2022–23 (1/0)
- Dickson Nwakaeme – AaB – 2010–11 (7/1)
- Jude Nworuh – FC Midtjylland, AC Horsens – 2007–10 (53/12) 2011–13 (35/5), 2012–13 (21/2)
- Paul Obiefule – Viborg FF – 2004–07 (40/0)
- Stephen Odey – Randers FC – 2021–26 (114/16)
- Nathan Oduwa – Vejle BK – 2018–19 (3/0)
- Edward Ofere – FC Vestsjælland – 2013–14 (9/2)
- Emmanuel Ogude – Vendsyssel FF – 2018–19 (23/3)
- Kim Ojo – Lyngby BK – 2016–18 (31/6)
- Noah Ojuola – FC Midtjylland – 2012–13 (3/0)
- Uche Okechukwu – Brøndby IF – 1991–94 (61/9)
- Chima Okorie – Ikast fS, Viborg FF – 1995–96 (9/1), 1996–97 (3/0)
- Isaac Oliseh – FC Midtjylland – 2013–14 (1/0)
- Sekou Oliseh – FC Midtjylland – 2008–10 (5/0)
- Chidi Dauda Omeje – Vejle BK – 2008–09 (8/1)
- Ogenyi Onazi – SønderjyskE – 2020–21 (2/0)
- Vincent Onovo – Randers FC – 2021–22 (8/0)
- Paul Onuachu – FC Midtjylland – 2012–19 (134/51)
- Raphael Onyedika – FC Midtjylland – 2021–23 (37/2)
- Frank Onyeka – FC Midtjylland – 2017–21 (95/15)
- Adeola Runsewe – FC Midtjylland, HB Køge, Silkeborg IF – 2007–08 (5/0), 2011–12 (28/2), 2012–13 (18/0) 2014–15 (24/1)
- Ibrahim Said – Viborg FF – 2021–25 (94/8)
- Adigun Salami – FC Midtjylland, Sønderjyske – 2006–12 (106/2), 2012–13 (2/0)
- Abdul Sule – AB, AC Horsens – 1998–2004 (137/30), 2005–06 (23/0)
- Abdulrahman Taiwo – SønderjyskE – 2021–22 (15/1)
- Emanuel Ukpai – Esbjerg fB – 2007–10 (36/2)
- Peter Utaka – Odense BK – 2008–12 (108/52)
- Izunna Uzochukwu – FC Midtjylland, Odense BK – 2008–15 (150/4), 2015–18 (52/1)

=== Senegal ===
- Khouma Babacar – FCK – 2021–23 (17/3)
- **Youssouph Badji** – **AGF** – 2024– (21/1)
- Oumar Diakhité – AaB – 2024–25 (13/0)
- **Ousmane Diao** – **FC Midtjylland** – 2024– (47/5)
- Pape Paté Diouf – FCK, Esbjerg fB – 2011–12 (19/4), 2013–14 (8/1)
- Baye Djiby Fall – Randers FC, Odense BK, Hobro IK – 2006–07 (30/14) 2013–15 (37/10), 2007–09 (31/18) 2011–12 (10/2), 2018–19 (6/0)
- Alioune Kébé – AC Horsens – 2010–12 (9/2)
- **Abdou Ndiaye** – **FC Midtjylland** – 2025– (3/0)
- Ibrahima N'Diaye – Randers FC – 2017–18 (4/0)
- Dame N'Doye – FCK – 2008–12 (104/59), 2018–20 (47/31)
- **Lamine Sadio** – **FC Nordsjælland** – 2025– (10/2)
- Tidiane Sane – Randers FC, Hobro IK – 2006–11 (151/26) 2012–13 (20/1), 2015–16 (12/0)
- Ousmane Sarr – Randers FC, Viborg FF – 2010–11 (21/4), 2013–14 (3/1)
- **Ousseynou Seck** – **Randers FC** – 2025– (12/0)
- **Ousmane Sow** – **Brøndby IF** – 2025– (14/0)

=== Sierra Leone ===
- Mustapha Bundu – AGF, FCK – 2016–20 (98/17) 2021–22 (22/3), 2020–21 (14/1)
- Alhaji Kamara – Vendsyssel FF, Randers FC, FC Midtjylland – 2018–19 (8/4), 2019–24 (82/21), 2023–25 (3/0)
- Mohamed Buya Turay – Odense BK – 2023–24 (13/1)

=== Somalia ===
- Osman Addo – Viborg FF – 2025–26 (8/2)

=== South Africa ===
- Bradley August – Lyngby BK – 1999–2002 (61/15)
- Josta Dladla – AGF – 2001–04 (62/9)
- Lorenzo Gordinho – Viborg FF – 2021–22 (4/0)
- **Gift Links** – **AGF** – 2019– (177/11)
- Mandla Masango – Randers FC – 2015–17 (29/7)
- **Thapelo Maseko** – **FCK** – 2026– (1/0)
- Siyabonga Nomvethe – AaB – 2006–09 (72/10)
- Lebogang Phiri – Brøndby IF – 2012–17 (109/7)
- Giovanni Rector – Brøndby IF – 2006–07 (5/0)
- Frank Schoeman – Lyngby BK – 1999–2002 (27/0)
- Luther Singh – FCK – 2021–22 (4/0)
- Elrio van Heerden – FCK – 2003–06 (26/4)
- Benedict Vilakazi – AaB – 2007–08 (5/0)
- Sibusiso Zuma – FCK, FC Nordsjælland – 1999–2005 (145/41), 2009–10 (13/1)

=== Tanzania ===
- Kelvin John – AaB – 2024–25 (23/0)

=== Togo ===
- Thibault Klidjé – Randers FC – 2025–26 (9/1)
- Komla Loglo Thomsen – Lyngby BK – 1996–97 (4/0)

=== Tunisia ===
- **Elias Achouri** – Viborg FF, **FCK** – 2022–23 (25/6), 2023– (73/9)
- Anis Ben Slimane – Brøndby IF – 2019–23 (104/9)
- Issam Jebali – Odense BK – 2019–23 (92/27)
- Omar Jebali – Odense BK – 2022–23 (1/0)
- Imed Louati – Vejle BK, Hobro IK – 2018–19 (21/2), 2019–20 (25/6)

=== Uganda ===
- **James Bogere** – **AGF** – 2025– (3/0)
- Robert Kakeeto – AaB – 2015–16 (1/0) 2017–21 (36/0)
- Emmanuel Okwi – SønderjyskE – 2015–17 (4/0)
- Moses Opondo – Vendsyssel FF, Odense BK, AC Horsens, FC Fredericia – 2018–19 (22/4), 2019–22 (64/3), 2022–23 (31/2), 2025–26 (17/0)

=== Zambia ===
- **Edward Chilufya** – **FC Midtjylland** – 2021– (74/8)
- Chris Katongo – Brøndby IF – 2006–09 (44/10)
- Mwape Miti – Odense BK – 1997–98 (19/2), 1999–2006 (159/68)
- Lubambo Musonda – AC Horsens, Silkeborg IF – 2022–23 (30/3), 2023–24 (24/0)
- Valance Nambishi – Silkeborg IF – 2017–18 (5/0) 2019–20 (10/0)
- Andrew Tembo – Lyngby BK – 1997–98 (26/2), 1999–2006 (192/10)

=== Zimbabwe ===
- Quincy Antipas – HB Køge, SønderjyskE, Brøndby IF, Hobro IK – 2009–10 (13/3), 2010–13 (63/16), 2012–14 (46/6), 2014–16 (31/5) 2017–19 (38/8)
- Tanaka Chinyahara – Hobro IK – 2015–16 (3/0)
- **Munashe Garananga** – FCK, **Lyngby BK** – 2024–27 (17/1), 2026– (2/0)
- Silas Songani – SønderjyskE – 2013–17 (53/8)

== Asia (AFC) ==
=== Australia ===
- Mustafa Amini – Randers FC, AGF – 2015–16 (29/0), 2016–20 (119/10)
- Daniel Arzani – AGF – 2020–21 (4/0)
- Michael Beauchamp – AaB – 2008–09 (12/1)
- Shane Cansdell-Sheriff – AGF – 2003–06 (82/7)
- Nathan Coe – FCK, Randers FC, SønderjyskE – 2007–09 (3/0), 2009–10 (4/0), 2010–12 (64/0)
- Jack Duncan – Randers FC – 2015–16 (1/0)
- Zach Duncan – AGF – 2019–22 (24/0)
- Tyrese Francois – Vejle BK – 2023–24 (15/0)
- Alex Gersbach – AGF – 2019–22 (8/0)
- Chris Ikonomidis – AGF – 2016–17 (18/1)
- John Iredale – AaB – 2024–25 (14/3)
- **Paul Izzo** – **Randers FC** – 2024– (59/0)
- **Oliver Jones** – **Randers FC** – 2024–25 (1/0) 2026– (2/0)
- Joel King – Odense BK – 2021–23 (17/0)
- Awer Mabil – FC Midtjylland, Esbjerg fB – 2015–16 (6/0) 2018–22 (102/16), 2016–17 (25/4)
- Dylan McGowan – Vendsyssel FF – 2018–19 (3/1)
- Brent McGrath – Brøndby IF, Esbjerg fB – 2009–13 (39/2), 2016–17 (17/1) 2018–19 (9/0)
- Jamie McMaster – AGF – 2005–06 (6/0)
- Nikola Mileusnic – Randers FC – 2020–21 (16/0)
- Sasho Petrovski – Viborg FF – 2001–04 (53/16)
- Mathew Ryan – FCK – 2022–23 (6/0)
- Lawrence Thomas – SønderjyskE – 2020–22 (56/0)
- Mohamed Toure – Randers FC – 2024–26 (45/11)
- **Musa Toure** – **Randers FC** – 2024– (16/0)
- David Williams – Brøndby IF – 2006–09 (34/4)
- **Marcus Younis** – **Brøndby IF** – 2025– (2/0)

=== China ===
- Wang Zhen'ao – Vejle BK – 2018–19 (2/0)

=== Indonesia ===
- Kevin Diks – AGF, FCK – 2019–21 (44/8), 2021–25 (106/12)

=== Iran ===
- Saeid Ezatolahi – Vejle BK – 2020–22 (42/5) 2023–24 (11/1)

=== Iraq ===
- Ali Adnan – Vejle BK – 2021–22 (1/0)
- **Amin Al-Hamawi** – **Randers FC** – 2025– (4/0)
- Frans Putros – AGF, Silkeborg IF, Hobro IK, Viborg FF – 2012–14 (3/0), 2014–15 (12/0), 2017–20 (38/1), 2021–22 (27/0)
- **Kevin Yakob** – **AGF** – 2022–23 (24/3) 2025– (26/4)
- Ahmed Yasin – AGF – 2015–16 (17/1)

=== Japan ===
- **Shō Fukuda** – **Brøndby IF** – 2025– (24/5)
- Suguru Hashimoto – Vejle BK – 2009–10 (2/0)
- Yoshikatsu Kawaguchi – FC Nordsjælland – 2003–04 (8/0)
- Masaki Murata – Vejle BK – 2024–26 (9/0)
- **Junnosuke Suzuki** – **FCK** – 2025– (22/2)
- Yuito Suzuki – Brøndby IF – 2023–25 (58/21)
- **Kōtarō Uchino** – **Brøndby IF** – 2025– (5/0)

=== Korea Republic ===
- **Cho Gue-sung** – **FC Midtjylland** – 2023–24 (30/12) 2025– (26/3)
- **Lee Han-beom** – **FC Midtjylland** – 2023– (43/1)
- Park Jung-bin – Hobro IK, Viborg FF – 2015–16 (22/2), 2016–17 (25/1)
- Yun Suk-young – Brøndby IF – 2016–17 (1/0)

=== Lebanon ===
- Bassel Jradi – FC Nordsjælland – 2013–14 (4/0)

=== Malaysia ===
- Dion Cools – FC Midtjylland – 2019–22 (38/1)

=== Pakistan ===
- Nabil Aslam – AC Horsens – 2008–09 (10/0) 2010–13 (56/2)
- Adnan Mohammad – FC Nordsjælland, FC Helsingør, Lyngby BK – 2015–17 (11/0), 2017–18 (28/3), 2019–20 (6/0)

=== Palestine ===
- Wessam Abou Ali – AaB, Silkeborg IF – 2017–20 (30/2), 2021–22 (3/0)
- Ahmed Daghim – FCK – 2018–19 (3/0)

=== Philippines ===
- Dennis Cagara – Brøndby IF, FC Nordsjælland, AGF, Lyngby BK – 2002–03 (7/0), 2007–10 (55/2), 2009–10 (14/0), 2011–12 (15/0)
- Michael Falkesgaard – Brøndby IF, Odense BK – 2012–13 (8/0), 2015–17 (11/0)
- Jerry Lucena – Esbjerg fB, AGF – 1999–00 (2/0) 2001–07 (180/4) 2012–16 (34/0), 2007–10 (94/2) 2011–12 (24/0)
- Kevin Ray Mendoza – AC Horsens – 2018–19 (6/0)
- Daisuke Sato – AC Horsens – 2017–18 (3/0)

=== Syria ===
- Louay Chanko – AaB – 2009–12 (59/3)
- Noah Shamoun – Randers FC – 2023–25 (15/0)

=== Thailand ===
- Nicholas Mickelson – Odense BK – 2021–24 (63/2)

== Europe (UEFA) ==
=== Albania ===
- Jashar Beluli – AC Horsens – 2022–23 (2/0)
- Besart Berisha – AaB, AC Horsens, – 2004–05 (2/0), 2005–06 (32/11), 2008–09 (13/4)
- Bardhec Bytyqi – AaB – 2018–19 (1/0)
- Lundrim Hetemi – Vejle BK – 2020–22 (41/0) 2023–25 (35/0)
- Agon Muçolli – Odense BK, FC Fredericia – 2022–23 (10/0), 2025–26 (16/4)
- Arbnor Muçolli – Vejle BK – 2018–19 (25/1) 2020–22 (52/9)
- Ylber Ramadani – Vejle BK – 2018–19 (26/0) 2020–21 (29/1)
- Blerim Rrustemi – AC Horsens – 2007–08 (1/0)

=== Armenia ===
- Robert Arzumanyan – Randers FC – 2007–10 (34/0)
- Edgar Babayan – Randers FC, Hobro IK, Vejle BK – 2013–17 (19/0) 2022–24 (32/2), 2017–20 (85/13), 2021–22 (13/0)
- André Calisir – Silkeborg IF – 2021–23 (21/0)
- Yura Movsisyan – Randers FC – 2009–11 (30/12)

=== Austria ===
- Hannes Eder – SønderjyskE – 2010–11 (2/0)
- Marvin Egho – Randers FC – 2018–24 (137/27)
- Martin Fraisl – FC Midtjylland – 2023–24 (7/0)
- Michael Gregoritsch – Brøndby IF – 2025–26 (11/2)
- Florian Hart – SønderjyskE – 2012–14 (46/1)
- Matthias Maak – SønderjyskE – 2016–17 (12/0)
- Georg Margreitter – FCK – 2013–14 (13/0)
- Marco Meilinger – AaB – 2016–18 (31/3)
- Rubin Okotie – SønderjyskE – 2013–14 (15/11)
- **Christopher Olivier** – **Brøndby IF** – 2026– (1/0)
- **Patrick Pentz** – **Brøndby IF** – 2023– (88/0)
- Simon Piesinger – Randers FC – 2019–22 (84/4)
- Martin Pušić – Esbjerg fB, FC Midtjylland, FCK, AGF, AC Horsens – 2013–15 (29/13), 2014–17 (53/23), 2017–18 (6/0), 2017–18 (15/6), 2018–19 (1/0)
- Daniel Royer – FC Midtjylland – 2015–16 (23/2)
- Philipp Schmiedl – SønderjyskE – 2020–22 (21/0)

=== Belarus ===
- Eduard Demenkovets – Vejle BK – 1995–97 (21/3)
- Andrei Shilo – FC Nordsjælland – 2002–03 (4/0)

=== Belgium ===
- Hans Christiaens – Brøndby IF – 1991–93 (23/2)
- Steve De Ridder – FCK – 2014–15 (23/2)
- Thomas Kaminski – FCK – 2015–16 (2/0)
- **Lucas Lissens** – Lyngby BK, **Randers FC** – 2023–25 (41/1), 2025– (15/0)
- **Nick Shinton** – **SønderjyskE** – 2026– (1/0)
- Gill Swerts – SønderjyskE – 2012–13 (14/0)
- **Renzo Tytens** – **Lyngby BK** – 2026– (1/1)
- **Jordi Vanlerberghe** – **Brøndby IF** – 2023– (49/3)
- Jonathan Vervoort – FC Nordsjælland – 2015–16 (1/0)

=== Bosnia and Herzegovina ===
- Anel Ahmedhodžić – Hobro IK – 2019–20 (19/1)
- Azer Bušuladžić – Odense BK, Vejle BK – 2013–16 (60/1), 2023–24 (13/0)
- Demir Čerkić – B 1909 – 1992–93 (10/0)
- Dario Đumić – Brøndby IF – 2011–16 (92/2)
- Armin Gigović – Odense BK, FC Midtjylland – 2022–23 (9/1), 2022–24 (43/0)
- Bojan Golubović – SønderjyskE – 2014–15 (9/1)
- Kenan Hajdarević – AC Horsens, SønderjyskE – 2010–13 (34/4), 2012–14 (11/2)
- Sanel Kapidžić – AGF – 2008–10 (12/1)
- Kenan Kodro – FCK – 2018–19 (8/1)
- Arman Mehaković – HB Køge – 2009–10 (15/0)
- Kerim Memija – Vejle BK, Hobro IK – 2018–19 (19/0), 2019–20 (2/0)
- **Ivan Miličević** – **AC Horsens** – 2026– (1/0)
- Alen Mustafić – Odense BK – 2022–24 (10/1)
- Bojan Tadić – Herfølge BK – 2004–05 (5/0)
- **Benjamin Tahirović** – **Brøndby IF** – 2024– (40/1)

=== Bulgaria ===
- Nikolay Bodurov – FC Midtjylland – 2015–16 (15/0)
- Bozhidar Kraev – FC Midtjylland – 2017–19 (29/1) 2020–21 (9/1)
- Dormushali Saidhodzha – Randers FC – 2006–07 (2/0)
- **Stefan Velkov** – Vejle BK, **SønderjyskE** – 2023–26 (69/7), 2026– (1/0)
- Todor Yanchev – Randers FC – 2006–07 (30/3)

=== Croatia ===
- Ivica Antolić – Hvidovre IF – 1996–97 (8/0)
- Karlo Bartolec – FC Nordsjælland, FCK – 2016–19 (89/7), 2019–21 (41/2)
- Dražen Besek – Ikast fS – 1993–94 (17/1)
- Darko Bodul – Odense BK – 2012–15 (49/8)
- David Čolina – Vejle BK – 2023–25 (38/0)
- **Matej Delač** – **AC Horsens** – 2018–21 (79/0) 2022–23 (27/0) 2026– (1/0)
- **Marko Divković** – **Brøndby IF** – 2021– (119/8)
- Josip Elez – AGF – 2015–16 (25/2)
- Ante Erceg – Brøndby IF, Esbjerg fB – 2018–20 (24/4), 2019–20 (7/0)
- **Martin Erlić** – **FC Midtjylland** – 2025– (18/2)
- Luka Hujber – Vejle BK – 2024–26 (21/0)
- Kristijan Ipša – FC Midtjylland – 2008–13 (89/2)
- Denis Kolinger – Vejle BK – 2020–22 (47/2) 2023–25 (21/0)
- **Dominik Kotarski** – **FCK** – 2025– (31/0)
- Dominik Kovačić – Vejle BK – 2020–21 (15/0)
- **Karlo Lusavec** – **AC Horsens** – 2026– (1/0)
- Filip Marčić – FC Midtjylland – 2008–10 (7/0)
- Samir Mekić – Ikast fS – 1994–95 (2/0)
- Dario Mijatović – Vejle BK – 2006–07 (26/0)
- Dino Mikanović – AGF – 2015–19 (95/0)
- Robert Mudražija – FCK – 2018–21 (20/0)
- Josip Posavec – AaB – 2022–23 (10/0)
- Stipe Radić – Viborg FF – 2023–26 (49/4)
- Josip Radošević – Brøndby IF – 2018–25 (187/9)
- Ante Rukavina – Viborg FF – 2015–16 (5/0)
- Ivan Runje – FC Nordsjælland – 2011–15 (73/2)
- Mirko Selak – BK Frem – 2003–04 (19/6)
- Mate Šestan – FCK – 1996–98 (30/4)
- Marin Skender – SønderjyskE – 2012–17 (121/0)
- Mario Tičinović – FC Nordsjælland – 2011–15 (96/5)

=== Cyprus ===
- Pieros Sotiriou – FCK – 2017–20 (71/25)

=== Czech Republic ===
- **Adam Gabriel** – **FC Midtjylland** – 2023– (38/3)
- Václav Kadlec – FC Midtjylland – 2015–17 (13/3)
- **Alex Král** – **FCK** – 2026– (1/0)
- Jan Kliment – Brøndby IF – 2016–18 (42/7)
- Jan Kuchta – FC Midtjylland – 2024–25 (9/1)
- Michael Lüftner – FCK – 2017–19 (35/1)
- Filip Novák – FC Midtjylland – 2015–18 (73/10)
- Zdeněk Pospěch – FCK – 2007–11 (108/13)
- Martin Raška – FC Midtjylland – 2006–10 (41/0)
- Libor Sionko – FCK – 2007–10 (54/9)
- Kamil Vacek – Odense BK – 2018–19 (2/0)
- Jan Žambůrek – Viborg FF – 2021–24 (36/1)

=== England ===
- Jubril Adedeji – AaB – 2024–25 (8/0)
- Mark Briggs – Herfølge BK – 2003–04 (1/0)
- Ben Bowditch – AB – 2003–04 (9/0)
- Tyler Burey – Odense BK – 2023–24 (6/0)
- Graham Easter – Viborg FF – 1993–96 (15/0)
- Adam Eckersley – Brøndby IF, AC Horsens, AGF – 2006–07 (4/0), 2008–09 (17/1), 2011–14 (55/2)
- Ovie Ejeheri – FC Fredericia – 2025–26 (2/0)
- Ben Godfrey – Brøndby IF – 2025–26 (12/1)
- Joshua Gowling – Herfølge BK – 2003–05 (30/0)
- Etienne Green – FC Fredericia – 2025–26 (4/0)
- Mark Howard – Brøndby IF, AGF – 2006–09 (45/1), 2008–10 (18/1) 2011–12 (3/0)
- Chris Kiwomya – AaB – 2001–02 (4/0)
- Stephen Lowe – Viborg FF – 1993–97 (38/0)
- Chris Orton – SønderjyskE – 2000–01 (23/1)
- Brandon Pierrick – Vejle BK – 2021–22 (3/0)
- Max Power – AGF – 2024–25 (14/0)
- David Preece – Silkeborg IF – 2005–07 (56/0)
- Mark Robins – FCK – 1996–97 (6/4)
- Scott Sellars – AGF – 2000–02 (20/1)
- Jamie Slabber – AB – 2003–04 (4/0)
- Christian Taylor – B.93 – 1998–99 (2/0)
- Nathan Trott – Vejle BK, FCK – 2023–24 (31/0), 2024–25 (17/0)
- Matthew Turner – Herfølge BK – 2003–04 (10/0)
- Jack Wilshere – AGF – 2021–22 (14/0)

=== Estonia ===
- Hannes Anier – Odense BK – 2012–14 (4/0)
- Risto Kallaste – Viborg FF – 1995–96 (23/4)
- Andres Oper – AaB – 1999–2003 (117/28)
- Urmas Rooba – FC Midtjylland, FCK, Vejle BK – 2000–02 (63/0), 2002–06 (33/0), 2006–07 (1/0)
- Kaimar Saag – Silkeborg IF – 2009–12 (69/11)
- Andrei Sidorenkov – SønderjyskE – 2008–11 (54/1)
- Indrek Zelinski – AaB, BK Frem – 2001–03 (35/13), 2003–04 (9/0)

=== Faroe Islands ===
- Jákup á Borg – Odense BK – 2003–04 (1/0)
- Martin Agnarsson – Viborg FF – 2022–24 (2/0)
- Viljormur Davidsen – Vejle BK – 2018–19 (26/0) 2020–22 (25/0)
- Jóan Símun Edmundsson – Odense BK – 2015–18 (58/11)
- Tem Hansen – Lyngby BK – 2007–08 (12/2)
- Hallur Hansson – AaB, AC Horsens, Vejle BK – 2012–13 (3/0), 2016–21 (149/19), 2021–22 (6/1)
- Brandur Hendriksson – FCK, Randers FC – 2014–16 (8/2), 2016–18 (9/1)
- Christian Holst – Lyngby BK, Silkeborg IF – 2007–08 (31/9), 2009–13 (116/29)
- Christian Høgni Jacobsen – Vejle BK, Esbjerg fB – 2001–02 (10/0), 2001–02 (3/0)
- Jón Rói Jacobsen – Brøndby IF, AaB – 2002–03 (4/0), 2005–08 (14/1)
- Rógvi Jacobsen – SønderjyskE – 2005–06 (4/0)
- René Joensen – Brøndby IF – 2011–12 (1/0)
- Óli Johannesen – AGF – 1999–2001 (16/0)
- Ári Jónsson – Silkeborg IF – 2012–13 (3/0) 2014–15 (2/0)
- Eggert Jónsson – FC Vestsjælland, SønderjyskE – 2014–15 (14/0), 2017–20 (82/4)
- Todi Jónsson – Lyngby BK, FCK – 1993–97 (76/18), 1997–2005 (167/54)
- **Adrian Justinussen** – **AC Horsens** – 2026– (1/0)
- Pól Jóhannus Justinussen – AaB – 2011–12 (1/0)
- Petur Knudsen – Lyngby BK – 2022–23 (8/2)
- Mattias Lamhauge – FC Fredericia – 2025–26 (15/0)
- Jakup Mikkelsen – Herfølge BK – 1995–2001 (136/2)
- Mads Boe Mikkelsen – Vendsyssel FF – 2018–19 (4/1)
- Sonni Nattestad – FC Midtjylland, AC Horsens – 2013–14 (4/0), 2018–19 (4/0)
- Gunnar Nielsen – Silkeborg IF – 2012–13 (8/0)
- Súni Olsen – AaB, Viborg FF – 2005–08 (26/1), 2007–08 (7/1)
- Gilli Rólantsson – AaB, Vejle BK – 2014–17 (23/0), 2023–24 (6/0)
- Gilli Sørensen – AaB, Vejle BK – 2014–17 (23/0), 2023–24 (6/0)
- Brandur Hendriksson – FCK, Randers – 2014–16 (8/1), 2016–18 (9/1)

=== Finland ===
- Tuomas Aho – AGF – 2004–06 (18/0)
- Oliver Antman – FC Nordsjælland – 2018–25 (96/13)
- Paulus Arajuuri – Brøndby IF – 2016–20 (67/3)
- Jasin-Amin Assehnoun – Vejle BK – 2023–24 (13/1)
- Carljohan Eriksson – FC Nordsjælland – 2023–24 (2/0)
- Tommi Grönlund – Viborg FF – 1996–97 (12/1)
- Jukka Hakala – Silkeborg IF – 1998–99 (1/0), 2001–02 (7/0)
- Markus Halsti – FC Midtjylland, Esbjerg fB – 2016–18 (24/0), 2018–20 (51/1)
- Petri Helin – Ikast fS, Viborg FF – 1993–96 (48/3), 1996–97 (5/0)
- Lukas Hradecky – Esbjerg fB, Brøndby IF – 2009–11 (18/0) 2012–13 (33/0), 2013–16 (69/0)
- Aki Hyryläinen – F.C. Copenhagen – 1996–98 (14/0)
- Richard Jensen – Vejle BK – 2024–25 (11/1)
- Jesse Joronen – AC Horsens, FCK – 2017–18 (28/0), 2018–19 (31/0)
- Kaan Kairinen – FC Midtjylland – 2016–18 (5/0)
- Joni Kauko – Randers FC, Esbjerg fB – 2016–18 (47/3), 2018–20 (65/14)
- **Topi Keskinen** – **Odense BK** – 2026– (1/0)
- Benjamin Källman – Vendsyssel FF – 2018–19 (7/2)
- **Julius Körkkö** – **AC Horsens** – 2026– (1/0)
- **Juho Lähteenmäki – Nordsjælland** – 2024– (42/2)
- Eero Markkanen – Randers FC – 2017–18 (8/0)
- Sakari Mattila – SønderjyskE – 2016–17 (18/1)
- Antti Niemi – FCK – 1995–97 (47/0)
- Jussi Nuorela – Silkeborg IF – 2001–02 (5/0)
- Noah Nurmi – Esbjerg fB – 2019–20 (1/0)
- Juhani Ojala – Vejle BK – 2020–21 (23/1)
- Antti Okkonen – Silkeborg IF – 2006–07 (12/0)
- Daniel O'Shaughnessy – FC Midtjylland – 2015–16 (1/0)
- Petri Pasanen – AGF – 2012–14 (44/2)
- Saku Puhakainen – Aarhus Fremad – 1997–98 (3/1)
- Teemu Pukki – Brøndby IF – 2014–18 (130/55)
- Jukka Raitala – FC Vestsjælland, AaB – 2014–15 (15/0), 2015–16 (3/0)
- Kari Rissanen – Ikast fS – 1997–98 (13/0)
- Janne Saarinen – F.C. Copenhagen – 2004–06 (16/0)
- Jukka Santala – FC Nordsjælland – 2005–07 (30/11)
- Naatan Skyttä – Odense BK – 2022–23 (8/2)
- Pyry Soiri – Esbjerg FB – 2019–20 (24/1)
- Tim Sparv – FC Midtjylland – 2014–20 (133/3)
- **Anssi Suhonen** – **Odense BK** – 2025– (11/0)
- Antti Sumiala – Ikast fS – 1994–95 (14/4)
- Janne Suokonautio – Hvidovre IF – 1996–97 (4/0)
- **Jimi Tauriainen** – **AC Horsens** – 2026– (1/0)
- Jani Viander – Midtjylland – 2003
- Walter Viitala – Viborg FF – 2016–17 (5/0)
- Sauli Väisänen – Odense BK – 2023–24 (3/0)
- Leo Walta – FC Nordsjælland – 2021–23 (19/0)

=== France ===
- Rocco Ascone – FC Nordsjælland – 2021–26 (22/2)
- Alain Behi – Randers FC – 2007–09 (12/0)
- **Bilal Brahimi** – **Viborg FF** – 2025– (16/2)
- Bédi Buval – Randers FC – 2007–09 (57/15)
- Stefan Campagnolo – BK Frem – 2003–04 (2/0)
- Florian Danho – Randers FC – 2024–26 (27/4)
- **Maël de Gevigney** – **Silkeborg IF** – 2026– (2/0)
- Garra Dembélé – AGF – 2007–08 (3/0)
- Wilfried Domoraud – Hobro IK – 2015–16 (12/1) 2017–18 (7/1)
- Mouhamadou Drammeh – Vejle BK – 2021–22 (21/1) 2023–24 (3/0)
- Hugo Ekitike – Vejle BK – 2020–21 (11/3)
- Mamoudou Karamoko – FCK – 2021–23 (7/0)
- **Elies Mahmoud** – **Randers FC** – 2024– (45/7)
- Bernard Mendy – Odense BK – 2010–12 (40/2)
- Michaël Murcy – Esbjerg fB – 2004–08 (96/19)
- Yahya Nadrani – AaB – 2022–23 (3/0)
- **Yonis Njoh** – **Viborg FF** – 2024– (24/8)
- Timothé Nkada – AaB – 2020–21 (11/0)
- William Prunier – FCK – 1995–96 (11/0)
- Baptiste Rolland – Lyngby BK – 2024–25 (7/0)
- **Ismaïl Seydi** – **SønderjyskE** – 2026– (1/0)
- Arthur Sorin – AGF – 2008–09 (8/0) 2011–14 (56/3)
- **Maxime Soulas** – **SønderjyskE** – 2021–22 (13/0) 2024– (62/5)
- Arthur Yamga – Vejle BK – 2020–22 (27/0)
- Yoram Zague – FCK – 2025–26 (7/2)

=== Georgia ===
- Mikheil Ashvetia – FCK – 2001–02 (5/0)
- Davit Devdariani – AGF – 2008–10 (38/3) 2011–14 (47/6)
- Vladimir Dvalishvili – Odense BK – 2014–16 (13/2)
- Giorgi Gocholeishvili – FCK – 2024–25 (21/1)
- Otar Kakabadze – Esbjerg fB – 2016–17 (9/0)
- Davit Khocholava – FCK – 2021–24 (40/2)
- Gocha Kokoshvili – Næstved BK – 1995–96 (13/0)
- Saba Lobzhanidze – Randers FC – 2017–20 (81/25)
- Lasha Parunashvili – Esbjerg fB – 2016–17 (2/0) 2018–20 (63/2)
- George Popkhadze – Viborg FF – 2006–08 (25/0)
- Davit Skhirtladze – AGF, Silkeborg IF – 2011–14 (47/2) 2015–16 (6/0), 2016–18 (61/13)
- Giorgi Tabatadze – Vejle BK – 2025–26 (11/1)
- Mate Vatsadze – AGF, Viborg FF, Silkeborg IF – 2012–14 (23/4) 2015–16 (20/5), 2016–17 (7/0), 2017–18 (15/3)
- Budu Zivzivadze – Esbjerg fB – 2016–17 (7/0)

=== Germany ===
- Kolja Afriyie – Esbjerg fB, FC Midtjylland – 2004–06 (54/4), 2006–10 (100/4) 2011–14 (58/0)
- **Fiete Arp** – **Odense BK** – 2025– (30/10)
- Benjamin Bellot – Brøndby IF – 2018–19 (1/0)
- Yann Aurel Bisseck – AGF – 2021–23 (62/5)
- Alexander Brunst – Vejle BK – 2020–22 (40/0)
- Dudu – FC Nordsjælland – 2021–22 (5/0)
- **Noah Ganaus** – **Odense BK** – 2025– (32/11)
- Senad Jarović – SønderjyskE – 2019–20 (4/0)
- Anthony Jung – Brøndby IF – 2017–21 (124/4)
- Dominik Kaiser – Brøndby IF – 2018–20 (53/11)
- Björn Kopplin – Hobro IK, Brøndby IF, Randers FC – 2017–18 (33/3), 2018–19 (2/0), 2018–25 (174/9)
- Sven Köhler – Odense BK – 2023–24 (22/0)
- **Mats Köhlert** – **Brøndby IF** – 2025– (21/0)
- Jonas Krumrey – Lyngby BK – 2024–25 (3/0)
- Mustafa Kučuković – SønderjyskE – 2010–11 (17/4)
- Steffen Lauser – AC Horsens – 2007–09 (18/1)
- Kilian Ludewig – AaB – 2022–23 (19/0)
- Nico Mantl – AaB, Viborg FF – 2022–23 (8/0), 2023–24 (15/0)
- Jean-Manuel Mbom – Viborg FF – 2023–26 (76/1)
- Max Meyer – FC Midtjylland – 2021–22 (8/0)
- Sebastian Mielitz – SønderjyskE – 2017–20 (98/0)
- **Youssoufa Moukoko** – **FCK** – 2025– (25/11)
- Hany Mukhtar – Brøndby IF – 2016–20 (106/24)
- Vincent Müller – AaB – 2024–25 (30/0)
- **Jona Niemiec** – **Odense BK** – 2025– (25/5)
- Philipp Ochs – AaB – 2018–19 (20/1)
- Denni Patschinsky – Viborg FF – 2001–02 (2/0), 2003–04 (6/0)
- **Julian Pauli** – **Odense BK** – 2026– (1/0)
- Luca Pfeiffer – FC Midtjylland – 2020–21 (11/1)
- Marvin Pourié – Silkeborg IF, FCK, SønderjyskE, Randers FC – 2011–13 (55/23), 2013–16 (15/2), 2014–15 (26/9), 2016–17 (48/11)
- Bjarne Pudel – AaB – 2024–25 (21/1)
- Diant Ramaj – FCK – 2024–25 (12/0)
- Benedikt Röcker – Brøndby IF – 2016–19 (90/5)
- Bassala Sambou – Randers FC – 2020–21 (23/1)
- Kent Scholz – Vejle BK – 1996–2000 (100/0)
- Marvin Schwäbe – Brøndby IF – 2018–21 (105/0)
- **Janni Serra** – **AGF** – 2023–24 (19/2) 2025– (20/3)
- Aaron Seydel – AaB – 2024–25 (6/1)
- Lennard Sowah – FC Vestsjælland – 2014–15 (3/0)
- Matti Steinmann – Vendsyssel FF – 2018–19 (8/1)
- Richard Sukuta-Pasu – Vejle BK – 2023–24 (2/0)
- Tom Trybull – Odense BK – 2023–24 (20/1)
- **Kjell Wätjen** – **FC Midtjylland** – 2026– (1/0)
- Stefan Wessels – Odense BK – 2010–12 (35/0)

=== Greece ===
- **Pantelis Chatzidiakos** – **FCK** – 2024– (52/3)
- Dimitrios Emmanouilidis – Vejle BK – 2021–22 (26/3) 2023–25 (39/7)
- Georgios Katsikas – Esbjerg fB – 2016–17 (10/0)
- Theofanis Mavrommatis – SønderjyskE – 2019–20 (2/0)
- Marios Oikonomou – FCK – 2020–22 (13/0)
- Kostas Tsimikas – Esbjerg fB – 2016–17 (9/2)
- Apostolos Vellios – FC Vestsjælland – 2014–15 (16/3)
- Zeca – FCK – 2017–23 (140/8)

=== Hungary ===
- Zoltán Balog – Viborg FF – 2007–08 (15/0)
- Zsolt Kalmár – Brøndby IF – 2016–18 (13/0)
- Balazs Kiskapusi – AB – 2003–04 (11/0)
- Zsolt Korcsmár – FC Midtjylland – 2017–19 (28/2)
- László Köteles – FCK – 2017–18 (1/0)
- **Ákos Markgráf** – **FCK** – 2026– (2/0)
- **Hunor Németh** – **FCK** – 2026– (1/0)
- Dániel Prosser – SønderjyskE – 2021–22 (11/2)
- Balázs Rabóczki – FCK – 2002–05 (41/0)
- Akos Takacs – Vejle BK – 2006–07 (15/0)
- Zoltán Szatmári – Lyngby BK – 2011–12 (1/0)
- Krisztián Vadócz – Odense BK – 2012–14 (36/9)

=== Iceland ===
- **Mikael Anderson** – FC Midtjylland, **AGF** – 2016–17 (2/0) 2019–22 (61/5), 2021–25 (106/17) 2026– (1/0)
- **David Aransson** – **Lyngby BK** – 2026– (1/0)
- Adam Örn Arnarson – FC Nordsjælland – 2014–16 (16/0)
- Kári Árnason – AGF, Esbjerg fB – 2007–09 (37/1), 2008–09 (8/0)
- Nóel Atli Arnórsson – AaB – 2024–25 (16/0)
- Andri Baldursson – FCK – 2021–22 (3/0)
- Guðjón Baldvinsson – FC Nordsjælland – 2014–15 (13/1)
- Atli Barkarson – SønderjyskE – 2021–22 (7/0) 2024–25 (4/0)
- **Brynjar Ingi Bjarnason** – **SønderjyskE** – 2026– (2/0)
- Theódór Elmar Bjarnason – Randers FC, AGF – 2012–15 (75/3), 2015–17 (53/2)
- **Viktor Daðason** – **FCK** – 2025– (18/3)
- Bjarni Ólafur Eiríksson – Silkeborg IF – 2005–07 (41/0)
- Alfreð Finnbogason – Lyngby BK – 2022–24 (17/5)
- Kjartan Finnbogason – AC Horsens, Vejle BK – 2016–18 (63/17) 2020–21 (7/2), 2018–19 (11/4) 2020–21 (1/0)
- Kolbeinn Finnsson – Lyngby BK – 2022–25 (50/3)
- Hólmbert Friðjónsson – Brøndby IF – 2014–15 (11/1)
- Felix Örn Friðriksson – Vejle BK – 2018–19 (1/0)
- Rúrik Gíslason – Viborg FF, Odense BK, FCK – 2007–08 (26/2), 2009–13 (87/10), 2012–15 (68/5)
- Stefan Gislason – Brøndby IF – 2007–10 (70/6)
- **Daníel Leó Grétarsson** – SønderjyskE, **AGF** – 2024–27 (54/3), 2026– (2/0)
- Andri Guðjohnsen – Lyngby BK – 2023–24 (28/13)
- Sveinn Aron Guðjohnsen – Odense BK – 2020–21 (13/1)
- Hannes Þór Halldórsson – Randers FC – 2016–18 (65/0)
- Hákon Arnar Haraldsson – FCK – 2021–23 (40/8)
- Eyjólfur Héðinsson – SønderjyskE, FC Midtjylland – 2010–13 (59/16), 2013–14 (10/0)
- Elfar Freyr Helgason – AC Horsens – 2016–17 (5/1)
- Hjörtur Hermannsson – Brøndby IF – 2016–21 (125/3)
- Ágúst Hlynsson – AC Horsens – 2020–21 (7/0)
- Kristall Máni Ingason – SønderjyskE – 2024–26 (34/7)
- Sverrir Ingi Ingason – FC Midtjylland – 2023–24 (24/2)
- **Daniel Jóhannesson** – **FC Nordsjælland** – 2025– (2/0)
- Ísak Bergmann Jóhannesson – FCK – 2021–24 (40/5)
- Thorhallur Dan Johansson – Vejle BK – 1997–98 (6/0)
- Hallgrímur Jónasson – Sønderjyske, Odense BK, Lyngby Boldklub – 2011–15 (93/5), 2014–16 (48/0), 2016–18 (30/2)
- Eggert Jónsson – SønderjyskE – 2017–20 (82/4)
- Kristófer Kristinsson – SønderjyskE – 2021–22 (20/0)
- Ögmundur Kristinsson – Randers FC – 2014–15 (2/0)
- **Daníel Freyr Kristjánsson** – FC Fredericia, **Lyngby BK** – 2025–26 (16/0), 2026– (2/0)
- Ólafur Kristjánsson – AGF – 1997–2001 (65/1)
- **Tómas Kristjánsson** – **AGF** – 2025– (10/2)
- **Valgeir Lunddal Friðriksson** – **Viborg FF** – 2026– (1/0)
- Sævar Atli Magnússon – Lyngby BK – 2022–25 (91/15)
- Gudmundur Mete – FC Midtjylland – 2001–02 (1/0)
- **Elías Rafn Ólafsson** – **FC Midtjylland** – 2021–23 (22/0) 2024– (49/0)
- Ísak Ólafsson – SønderjyskE – 2019–21 (4/0)
- Orri Óskarsson – FCK – 2021–25 (38/15)
- Sölvi Ottesen – SønderjyskE, FCK – 2008–10 (54/6), 2010–13 (43/8)
- **Victor Pálsson** – Esbjerg fB, **AC Horsens** – 2015–17 (35/3), 2026– (1/0)
- Holmar Örn Runarsson – Silkeborg IF – 2006–07 (25/4)
- **Rúnar Alex Rúnarsson** – FC Nordsjælland, **FCK** – 2014–18 (60/0), 2025– (2/0)
- Frederik Schram – Lyngby Boldklub – 2019–21 (3/0)
- Aron Sigurðarson – AC Horsens – 2022–23 (31/7)
- Björn Bergmann Sigurðarson – FCK – 2014–15 (14/1)
- Baldur Sigurðsson – SønderjyskE – 2014–16 (15/0)
- Gylfi Sigurðsson – Lyngby BK – 2023–24 (5/0)
- Hannes Sigurdsson – Brøndby IF – 2006–07 (9/2)
- Helgi Sigurdsson – AGF – 2003–06 (41/8)
- Ragnar Sigurðsson – FCK – 2011–14 (69/4) 2019–21 (5/0)
- Ísak Andri Sigurgeirsson – Viborg FF – 2025–26 (5/0)
- **Rúnar Þór Sigurgeirsson** – **SønderjyskE** – 2025– (3/0)
- Ari Freyr Skúlason – Odense BK – 2013–16 (89/7)
- Ólafur Ingi Skúlason – SønderjyskE – 2009–11 (41/3)
- Arnór Smárason – Esbjerg fB – 2010–11 (25/3) 2012–13 (18/6)
- Hördur Sveinsson – Silkeborg IF – 2005–07 (34/9)
- Björn Daníel Sverrisson – AGF – 2016–19 (36/3)
- Guðmundur Þórarinsson – FC Nordsjælland, AaB – 2014–16 (35/1), 2021–22 (6/0)
- Stefán Teitur Þórðarson – Silkeborg IF – 2021–24 (83/12)
- Jón Dagur Þorsteinsson – Vendsyssel FF, AGF – 2018–19 (22/3), 2019–22 (86/18)
- Gunnar Heidar Thorvaldsson – Esbjerg fB – 2008–10 (24/2)
- **Ísak Þorvaldsson** – **Lyngby BK** – 2026– (1/0)
- Aron Elís Þrándarson – Odense BK – 2019–23 (86/3)
- Tómas Ingi Tómasson – AGF – 1998–2000 (37/4)
- Bjarni Viðarsson – Silkeborg IF – 2012–13 (12/1) 2014–15 (4/0)
- Adalstein Viglundsson – B 1909 – 1992–93 (6/0)

=== Israel ===
- Daniel Niron – Hvidovre IF – 1996–97 (15/5)

=== Italy ===
- Sebastian Avanzini – AC Horsens – 2018–20 (14/0)
- Vito Mannone – Esbjerg fB – 2019–20 (12/0)
- Franco Tongya – Odense BK – 2022–24 (27/3)

=== Kazakhstan ===
- Ramazan Orazov – Silkeborg IF – 2024–25 (16/2)

=== Kosovo ===
- Erton Fejzullahu – Randers FC – 2010–11 (7/0)
- Besar Halimi – Brøndby IF – 2017–19 (50/9)
- Elbasan Rashani – Brøndby IF – 2014–16 (24/3)
- **Albert Rrahmani** – **SønderjyskE** – 2024– (8/2)
- Astrit Selmani – FC Midtjylland – 2022–23 (3/0)
- Herolind Shala – Lyngby BK – 2017–18 (14/1)

=== Latvia ===
- Imants Bleidelis – Viborg FF – 2002–05 (55/6)
- Igors Stepanovs – Esbjerg fB – 2006–08 (17/0)

=== Lithuania ===
- Briaunys Algimantas – FCK – 1995–96 (1/0)
- Rytis Leliuga – HB Køge – 2009–10 (13/0)
- Aurelijus Skarbalius – Brøndby IF, Herfølge BK – 1996–2006 (142/1), 2004–05 (8/0)
- Lukas Spalvis – AaB – 2013–16 (53/26)
- Arunas Suika – Lyngby BK, Silkeborg IF – 1995–96 (20/4), 1995–97 (15/4)
- Donatas Vencevicius – FCK – 1999–2002 (46/2)
- Emilijus Zubas – Viborg FF – 2013–14 (1/0)
- Tomas Žvirgždauskas – Næstved BK – 1995–96 (4/0)

=== Luxembourg ===
- **Mathias Olesen** – **SønderjyskE** – 2026– (1/0)

=== Moldova ===
- Simeon Bulgaru – Viborg FF – 2007–08 (7/0)
- Serguei Dadu – FC Midtjylland – 2006–08 (23/5)

=== Montenegro ===
- Luka Đorđević – Vejle BK – 2021–22 (20/5)
- Filip Đukić – Hvidovre IF – 2023–24 (25/0)
- Slobodan Marović – Silkeborg IF – 1994–95 (15/0)
- Srđan Radonjić – Odense BK, Viborg FF – 2006–08 (18/4), 2007–08 (5/1)
- Vladimir Rodić – Randers FC, Silkeborg IF – 2017–18 (12/1), 2017–18 (12/6)
- Samel Šabanović – Esbjerg fB – 2008–09 (14/4)
- Milenko Vukčević – Viborg FF – 1996–97 (14/1)

=== Netherlands ===
- Rody de Boer – AaB – 2024–25 (1/0)
- Khalid Boulahrouz – Brøndby IF – 2013–14 (13/0)
- Damian van Bruggen – Vejle BK – 2024–25 (29/1)
- Mick van Buren – Esbjerg fB – 2013–16 (68/18)
- **Wessel Dammers** – **Randers FC** – 2023– (94/10)
- Lorenzo Davids – Randers FC – 2012–14 (9/0)
- Fernando Derveld – Odense BK, Esbjerg fB – 2001–05 (122/6), 2006–08 (34/0)
- Jelle Duin – AGF, Vejle BK – 2022–23 (15/3), 2024–26 (8/1)
- Mohamed El Makrini – Odense BK – 2015–17 (46/1)
- Sander Fischer – Vendsyssel FF – 2018–19 (30/1)
- **Tim Freriks** – **Viborg FF** – 2025– (23/4)
- Donny Gorter – AaB, Viborg FF – 2014–15 (9/0), 2016–17 (1/0)
- Ninos Gouriye – Vendsyssel FF – 2018–19 (5/0)
- Indy Groothuizen – FC Nordsjælland, Vejle BK – 2016–17 (12/0), 2020–21 (13/0)
- Fabian Ho-a-Hing – Lyngby BK – 1996–97 (4/0)
- **Mees Hoedemakers** – **Viborg FF** – 2025– (19/1)
- Jos Hooiveld – FCK – 2010–11 (11/0)
- Jamie Jacobs – Viborg FF – 2023–25 (13/0)
- Tim Janssen – Esbjerg fB, FC Midtjylland – 2009–11 (61/23), 2011–14 (51/10)
- Mylian Jimenez – AaB – 2024–25 (27/0)
- Kellian van der Kaap – Viborg FF – 2021–22 (1/0)
- Mats Knoester – AGF – 2023–24 (14/0)
- Lars Kramer – Viborg FF, AaB – 2021–22 (23/4), 2022–23 (31/2) 2024–25 (29/0)
- Clint Leemans – Viborg FF – 2021–23 (63/9)
- Timo Letschert – Lyngby BK – 2022–23 (5/0)
- Mart Lieder – SønderjyskE, Odense BK – 2018–20 (53/13), 2019–22 (30/3)
- Kees Luijckx – SønderjyskE, Silkeborg IF – 2015–20 (124/12), 2019–20 (8/0)
- Hans Mulder – FC Nordsjælland – 2014–15 (8/0)
- Steve Olfers – AaB – 2007–09 (42/1)
- Leeroy Owusu – Odense BK – 2023–24 (28/0) 2025–26 (32/4)
- **Mohamed Sankoh** – **Randers FC** – 2026– (1/0)
- Remco van der Schaaf – Brøndby IF, Randers FC – 2008–11 (44/6), 2012–13 (9/0)
- Robin Schouten – SønderjyskE – 2021–22 (5/0)
- Mees Siers – SønderjyskE – 2014–15 (3/0)
- Stijn Spierings – Brøndby IF – 2024–26 (29/2)
- Rafael van der Vaart – FC Midtjylland, Esbjerg fB – 2016–18 (17/2), 2018–19 (3/0)
- Jeroen Veldmate – Viborg FF – 2015–17 (13/1)
- Tom van Weert – AaB – 2018–21 (91/27)
- Clemens Zwijnenberg – AaB – 1997–98 (9/0)

=== Northern Ireland ===
- Roy Carroll – Odense BK – 2009–11 (46/0)
- Bailey Peacock-Farrell – AGF – 2023–24 (21/0)

=== North Macedonia ===
- **Sefer Emini** – **SønderjyskE** – 2024– (49/3)
- Bajram Fetai – Silkeborg IF, FC Nordsjælland, Lyngby BK – 2005–07 (18/2), 2006–11 (127/27), 2010–12 (42/6)
- Nikola Gjoševski – FC Midtjylland – 2005–06 (1/0)
- Dejvi Glavevski – Vejle BK – 1995–98 (47/11)
- Ferhan Hasani – Brøndby IF – 2013–15 (35/7)
- Ahmed Iljazovski – Hvidovre IF – 2023–24 (28/0)
- Erdinc Iljazovski – Lyngby BK – 1994–96 (2/1)
- Gorazd Mihailov – Hvidovre IF – 1996–97 (4/0)
- Ivan Nikolov – SønderjyskE – 2024–25 (10/0)
- **Lirim Qamili** – AC Horsens, Hvidovre IF, **SønderjyskE** – 2020–21 (25/2) 2022–23 (7/0), 2023–24 (28/6), 2024– (51/16)
- Hakan Redzep – FC Nordsjælland – 2013–14 (1/0)
- Dzevdet Sainoski – FC Nordsjælland – 2002–03 (12/1)
- Artim Sakiri – AaB – 2005–06 (12/3)
- Aleksandar Stankov – Viborg FF – 2013–14 (30/5) 2016–17 (9/1)
- Aleksandar Trajkovski – AaB – 2021–22 (7/0)

=== Norway ===
- Alexander Aas – Odense BK – 2004–07 (49/2)
- Mustafa Abdellaoue – FCK, Odense BK – 2011–13 (14/4), 2013–14 (26/9)
- **Ruben Alte** – **Viborg FF** – 2026– (1/0)
- Yaw Ihle Amankwah – Hobro IK – 2017–19 (44/0)
- Trond Andersen – AaB, Brøndby IF – 2003–06 (65/2), 2005–06 (18/1)
- Vetle Andersen – Lyngby BK – 1993–95 (27/1)
- **Kristian Arnstad** – **AGF** – 2024– (55/10)
- Kristoffer Askildsen – FC Midtjylland – 2024–25 (12/0)
- Mushaga Bakenga – Esbjerg fB – 2013–14 (24/6)
- Petter Belsvik – AaB – 1994–95 (3/1)
- André Bergdølmo – FCK – 2005–2007 (33/3)
- Fredrik Semb Berge – Brøndby IF – 2014–15 (7/1)
- Lasse Berg Johnsen – Randers FC – 2020–23 (79/4)
- Johan Lædre Bjørdal – AGF – 2013–14 (15/0)
- Trond Bjørndal – Vejle BK – 1999–2000 (8/0)
- Stig Inge Bjørnebye – Brøndby IF – 1999–2000 (13/2)
- Lars Bohinen – Lyngby BK – 2000–02 (26/0)
- Bård Borgersen – AaB – 2001–05 (46/1)
- Daniel Braaten – FCK – 2013–14 (23/1)
- Harald Brattbakk – FCK – 1999–2001 (31/14)
- Ola Brynhildsen – FC Midtjylland – 2023–25 (30/7)
- Tobias Børkeeiet – Brøndby IF – 2019–22 (34/1)
- Christian Clem – Lyngby BK, Fremad Amager, Brøndby IF – 1991–93 (14/1), 1994–95 (15/5), 1994–95 (3/1)
- Tore André Dahlum – AaB – 2000–01 (10/2)
- Dan Eggen – Brøndby IF – 1991–98 (167/19)
- Sindre Walle Egeli – FC Nordsjælland – 2023–26 (40/11)
- **Mohamed Elyounoussi** – **FCK** – 2023– (87/25)
- Håkon Evjen – Brøndby IF – 2022–24 (26/4)
- Mohammed Fellah – Esbjerg fB, FC Nordsjælland, Odense BK – 2013–16 (55/3), 2016–17 (12/0), 2017–18 (3/0)
- Morten Fevang – Odense BK – 2005–07 (28/5)
- Bård Finne – SønderjyskE – 2020–22 (17/0)
- Håvard Flo – AGF – 1994–97 (53/27)
- Ulrik Flo – Silkeborg IF – 2016–17 (3/0)
- Iver Fossum – AaB, FC Midtjylland – 2019–23 (121/23), 2023–24 (4/0)
- Petter Furuseth – Viborg FF, FC Midtjylland – 2007–08 (17/2), 2007–09 (16/2)
- Ruben Gabrielsen – FCK – 2021–22 (4/0)
- Christer George – AGF – 2004–06 (40/10)
- Thomas Gill – AaB Fodbold, FCK – 1993–96 (81/0), 1998–99 (5/0)
- Daniel Granli – AaB – 2020–23 (77/3)
- Christian Grindheim – FCK – 2011–13 (37/0)
- Sten Grytebust – Odense BK, FCK, Vejle BK – 2016–19 (114/0), 2019–21 (16/0), 2021–22 (10/0)
- Stig Haaland – Aarhus Fremad – 1998–99 (24/3)
- Andreas Hagen – Viborg FF – 2013–14 (9/0)
- Rune Hagen – Herfølge BK – 2004–05 (13/0)
- **Teodor Berg Haltvik** – **SønderjyskE** – 2026– (2/0)
- Jan Halvor Halvorsen – AGF – 1991–94 (67/1)
- Brede Hangeland – FCK – 2005–08 (63/3)
- Alexander Lund Hansen – Odense BK – 2009–12 (6/0)
- Isak Hansen-Aarøen – AaB – 2024–25 (14/0)
- Jonny Hanssen – AGF – 2004–06 (36/4)
- Tom Reidar Haraldsen – Viborg FF – 2006–07 (3/0)
- Sigurd Hauso Haugen – AGF – 2022–23 (31/2) 2024–25 (2/0)
- **Mads Hedenstad Christiansen** – **AGF** – 2025– (1/0)
- Henrik Heggheim – Brøndby IF – 2021–24 (29/1)
- Roger Helland – Brøndby IF – 1999–2000 (12/0)
- Sivert Heltne Nilsen – AC Horsens – 2018–20 (32/1)
- Travis Hernes – AaB – 2024–25 (12/0)
- Daniel Fredheim Holm – AaB – 2009–10 (13/3)
- **Nikolai Hopland** – **Randers FC** – 2026– (1/0)
- Magne Hoseth – FCK – 2004–05 (28/8)
- Tom Høgli – FCK – 2014–18 (50/1)
- Atle Roar Håland – Odense BK, AGF – 2007–11 (113/3), 2011–13 (34/0)
- Pål Alexander Kirkevold – Hobro IK – 2015–16 (15/2) 2017–20 (84/35)
- **Magnus Knudsen** – **AGF** – 2023–24 (27/3) 2025– (16/0)
- **Ole Martin Kolskogen** – **AC Horsens** – 2026– (1/0)
- Julian Kristoffersen – FCK, Hobro IK – 2015–16 (2/0), 2018–20 (44/6)
- Kristoffer Larsen – Lyngby BK – 2016–18 (41/5)
- Magnus Lekven – Esbjerg fB – 2012–17 (102/4)
- **Birger Meling** – **FCK** – 2023– (47/0)
- Vegard Leikvoll Moberg – Silkeborg IF – 2019–20 (11/1)
- Morten Moldskred – AGF – 2011–13 (2/0)
- **Viljar Myhra** – **Odense BK** – 2023–24 (15/0) 2025– (23/0)
- Thomas Myhre – FCK – 2000–01 (14/0)
- Erik Mykland – FCK – 2001–04 (51/1)
- Ivan Näsberg – Viborg FF – 2024–26 (19/3)
- Simen Bolkan Nordli – Randers FC – 2022–25 (72/21)
- Andreas Nordvik – Esbjerg fB – 2016–17 (24/2)
- **Runar Norheim** – **FC Nordsjælland** – 2025– (25/5)
- Ohi Omoijuanfo – Brøndby IF – 2022–25 (59/23)
- Kristian Flittie Onstad – Esbjerg fB – 2006–09 (68/0)
- Håkon Opdal – SønderjyskE – 2012–13 (13/0)
- Jan Tore Ophaug – Odense BK – 2004–08 (73/1)
- Marcus Pedersen – Odense BK – 2012–13 (24/7)
- Morten Pedersen – Brøndby IF – 1991–92 (1/0)
- **Mikkel Rakneberg** – **Odense BK** – 2026– (1/0)
- Mathias Rasmussen – FC Nordsjælland – 2016–20 (96/8)
- Tore Reginiussen – Odense BK – 2011–13 (23/2)
- Roger Risholt – AGF – 2005–06 (20/1)
- **Colin Rösler** – **AGF** – 2026–(5/0)
- Einar Rossbach – Silkeborg IF – 1994–95 (11/0)
- Sigurd Rosted – Brøndby IF – 2019–23 (84/5)
- Kjetil Ruthford Pedersen – Esbjerg fB – 2002–04 (62/2)
- Espen Ruud – Odense BK – 2008–15 (197/19)
- Martin Samuelsen – AaB – 2020–21 (14/0)
- Andreas Schjelderup – FC Nordsjælland – 2020–24 (71/26)
- Sebastian Sebulonsen – Brøndby IF – 2022–25 (61/3)
- **Martin Sjølstad** – **Randers FC** – 2025– (12/0)
- Jørgen Skjelvik – Odense BK – 2019–23 (84/4)
- Håkon Skogseid – Odense BK – 2014–15 (15/0)
- **Markus Solbakken** – **AGF** – 2025– (12/2)
- **Ola Solbakken** – **FC Nordsjælland** – 2025– (17/6)
- Ståle Solbakken – AaB, FCK – 1997–2001 (79/13), 2000–01 (14/4)
- Ragnvald Soma – FC Nordsjælland – 2012–13 (1/0)
- Benjamin Stokke – Randers FC – 2018–20 (38/5)
- Jarl André Storbæk – SønderjyskE – 2010–13 (68/4)
- Kenneth Storvik – Lyngby BK, BK Frem – 1995–96 (4/0), 2003–04 (7/1)
- Frank Strandli – AaB – 1998–2001 (38/14)
- Magne Sturød – Odense BK, AC Horsens – 2005–07 (12/0), 2006–08 (13/0)
- Sander Svendsen – Odense BK – 2019–23 (54/17)
- Bengt Sæternes – Odense BK – 2007–08 (9/1)
- Alexander Sørloth – FC Midtjylland – 2017–18 (19/10)
- **Fredrik Ulvestad** – **Odense BK** – 2026– (1/0)
- Alex Valencia – AGF – 2007–09 (24/2)
- Gustav Wikheim – FC Midtjylland, FC Nordsjælland – 2016–20 (93/15), 2024–25 (13/0)
- Fredrik Winsnes – AaB – 2005–07 (45/4)
- Kjetil Wæhler – AaB – 2008–12 (83/3)
- Thomas Wæhler – Lyngby BK – 1996–97 (7/0)
- **Ulrik Yttergård Jenssen** – FC Nordsjælland, **Odense BK** – 2017–21 (108/8) 2022–23 (2/0), 2026– (1/0)
- Anders Østli – SønderjyskE, Vestsjælland – 2008–12 (106/2), 2014–15 (28/0)
- **Robin Østrøm** – Odense BK, **Silkeborg IF** – 2019–23 (30/1), 2022– (93/0)

=== Poland ===
- Robert Bernat – Vejle BK – 1997–98 (1/0)
- Adam Buksa – FC Midtjylland – 2024–26 (27/13)
- Marek Czakon – BK Frem, Næstved BK – 1991–93 (24/3), 1993–94 (7/2)
- Arkadiusz Gmur – AGF – 1994–96 (37/1)
- Kamil Grabara – AGF, F.C. Copenhagen – 2018–19 (16/0), 2020–21 (29/0), 2021–24 (87/0)
- Czesław Jakołcewicz – Odense BK – 1991–92 (7/0)
- Jacek Kacprzak – AGF – 1999–2000 (6/1)
- Mateusz Kowalczyk – Brøndby IF – 2023–24 (1/0)
- Dawid Kurminowski – AGF – 2021–23 (29/2)
- Rafał Kurzawa – FC Midtjylland, Esbjerg fB – 2018–19 (6/1), 2019–20 (12/2)
- Maciej Łykowski – AGF – 2001–02 (1/0)
- Tomasz Mazurkiewicz – AGF, SønderjyskE – 2001–05 (58/5), 2005–06 (4/1)
- Rafał Niżnik – Brøndby IF – 2001–03 (32/3)
- Arkadiusz Onyszko – Viborg FF, Odense BK, FC Midtjylland – 1998–2004 (173/0), 2003–09 (177/0), 2009–10 (13/0)
- Piotr Parzyszek – Randers FC – 2015–16 (8/1)
- Andrzej Rudy – Brøndby IF – 1991–92 (8/1)
- Marek Saganowski – AaB – 2008–09 (13/3)
- **Bartosz Slisz** – **Brøndby IF** – 2025– (14/0)
- Piotr Stokowiec – AB – 2001–02 (10/1)
- Artur Toborek – Ikast fS – 1994–95 (18/1)
- Grzegorz Więzik – Silkeborg IF, Viborg FF – 1991–93 (19/3), 1993–94 (18/3)
- Kamil Wilczek – Brøndby IF, F.C. Copenhagen – 2016–20 (124/71), 2020–22 (33/11)
- Patryk Wolański – AC Horsens – 2016–17 (1/0)

=== Portugal ===
- Aurélio Buta – FCK – 2025–26 (12/1)
- Hélder Cabral – Vejle BK – 2008–09 (4/0)
- Pedro Ferreira – AaB – 2020–23 (73/4)
- **Pedro Ganchas** – **Silkeborg IF** – 2024– (55/3)
- Diogo Gonçalves – FCK – 2022–25 (38/14)
- Paulinho – Viborg FF – 2022–23 (11/1)
- João Pereira – SønderjyskE, Odense BK – 2015–16 (24/1) 2018–20 (6/1), 2016–18 (23/0)
- **Dani Silva** – **FC Midtjylland** – 2024– (23/1)
- Tiago Targino – Randers FC – 2008–09 (17/1)

=== Republic of Ireland ===
- Michael Doyle – AGF – 2001–02 (22/4)
- Kevin Foley – FCK – 2014–15 (4/0)
- Liam Miller – AGF – 2001–02 (18/0)
- Sean Murray – Vejle BK – 2018–19 (11/0)

=== Romania ===
- George Florescu – FC Midtjylland – 2007–10 (54/3)
- Jean-Claude Bozga – FC Vestsjælland – 2013–15 (59/3)
- Adrian Petre – Esbjerg fB – 2018–20 (51/11)
- Alexi Pitu – Vejle BK – 2025–26 (8/0)

=== Russia ===
- Oleg Ivanov – Ikast fS – 1995–96 (6/0)
- Dzhamaldin Khodzhaniyazov – AGF – 2015–17 (35/1)
- Leon Klassen – Lyngby BK – 2024–25 (22/1)
- Erik Korchagin – AB – 2000–01 (17/2)
- German Onugkha – Vejle BK, FCK – 2020–21 (17/5) 2023–25 (52/28), 2024–26 (5/0)
- Valeri Popovitch – Ikast fS – 1995–96 (6/3)
- Ivan Repyakh – Vejle BK – 2020–21 (1/0)

=== Scotland ===
- **Luis Binks** – **Brøndby IF** – 2025– (35/3)
- Scott McKenna – FCK – 2023–24 (13/0)

=== Serbia ===
- Aleksandar Čavrić – AGF – 2015–16 (19/1)
- Nikola Đurđić – Randers FC – Randers FC – 2016–18 (26/3)
- Mihajlo Ivančević – Odense BK – 2021–24 (30/0)
- Milan Jevtović – AGF – 2020–22 (16/0)
- Aleksandar Jovanović – AGF – 2016–20 (75/0)
- Milan Makarić – AaB – 2021–23 (38/8)
- Erhan Mašović – AC Horsens – 2019–20 (18/0)
- Uroš Matić – FCK – 2016–18 (24/4)
- Nikola Mirković – SønderjyskE – 2019–20 (4/0)
- Nenad Novaković – FC Nordsjælland – 2008–10 (27/0)
- Andrija Pavlović – FCK, Brøndby IF – 2016–18 (55/15), 2020–22 (38/4)
- Vladimir Prijović – AaB – 2021–22 (2/0)
- Milan Simeunović – Viborg FF – 1999–2000 (1/0)

=== Slovakia ===
- Pavol Bajza – Vejle BK – 2018–19 (24/0)
- Filip Blažek – Brøndby IF – 2017–18 (1/0)
- Martin Dúbravka – Esbjerg fB – 2013–16 (66/0)
- Ján Greguš – FCK – 2016–19 (67/4)
- Maroš Klimpl – FC Midtjylland – 2007–08 (14/1)
- Filip Lesniak – AaB, Silkeborg IF – 2017–19 (39/2), 2019–20 (32/0)
- Stanislav Lobotka – FC Nordsjælland – 2015–17 (61/0)
- Ivan Mesík – FC Nordsjælland – 2019–21 (38/0)
- Samuel Mráz – Brøndby IF – 2019–20 (21/4)
- Michal Peškovič – Viborg FF – 2013–14 (32/0)
- Pavol Šafranko – AaB – 2017–19 (30/2)
- Jakub Sylvestr – AaB – 2016–18 (22/5)
- Milan Timko – AaB – 2003–04 (1/0)
- Martin Vantruba – FC Nordsjælland – 2020–21 (1/0)
- Denis Vavro – FCK – 2017–19 (61/1) 2021–25 (77/4)
- Róbert Veselovský – Viborg FF, AC Horsens – 2007–08 (8/0), 2011–12 (5/0)

=== Slovenia ===
- Branko Ilić – Vejle BK – 2018–19 (5/0)
- **Srđan Kuzmić** – **Viborg FF** – 2023– (68/6)
- Mitja Mörec – Lyngby BK – 2010–11 (5/0)
- Gregor Sikošek – Brøndby IF, Silkeborg IF – 2016–18 (11/0), 2017–18 (16/0)
- Igor Vekić – Vejle BK – 2023–26 (60/0)
- Benjamin Verbič – FCK – 2015–18 (69/16)
- **Žan Zaletel** – **Viborg FF** – 2022– (65/1)

=== Scotland ===
- Chris Iwelumo – Aarhus Fremad – 1998–99 (27/4)
- Steven Pressley – Randers FC – 2008–09 (9/0)

=== Spain ===
- Agus – Esbjerg fB – 2018–19 (10/0)
- Raúl Albentosa – Vejle BK – 2021–22 (13/2) 2023–24 (30/2)
- Pep Biel – FCK – 2019–23 (95/23)
- Diego Caballo – AaB – 2024–25 (5/0)
- Thomas Christiansen – Herfølge BK – 2000–01 (4/2)
- Daniel de Pedro Vide – Fremad Amager – 1994–95 (2/0)
- Adrián López – AGF – 2015–16 (5/0)
- Julián Luque – SønderjyskE – 2013–14 (7/1)
- Nils Mortimer – Viborg FF – 2022–24 (22/1)
- Marc Muniesa – Lyngby BK – 2023–24 (10/0)
- Rufo – AaB – 2020–22 (22/3)
- Óscar Whalley – AGF – 2018–20 (12/0)

=== Sweden ===
- **Alexander Ahl Holmström** – **Odense BK** – 2026– (1/0)
- **Rami Al Hajj** – Odense BK, **Silkeborg IF** – 2023–24 (29/3), 2025– (22/0)
- Joel Allansson – Randers FC – 2014–19 (71/2)
- Marcus Allbäck – Lyngby BK, FCK – 1997–98 (4/1), 2005–08 (85/34)
- Michael Almebäck – Brøndby IF, Esbjerg fB – 2013–14 (16/0), 2014–16 (22/0)
- John Alvbåge – Viborg FF – 2005–08 (87/0)
- Adam Andersson – Randers FC, Lyngby BK – 2022–23 (26/1), 2024–25 (10/0)
- Anders Andersson – AaB – 1998–2001 (70/8)
- Elias Andersson – Viborg FF – 2024–25 (6/0)
- Hugo Andersson – Randers FC – 2021–25 (58/4)
- Joel Andersson – FC Midtjylland – 2018–25 (155/4)
- Mattias Anderson – Randers FC – 2021–22 (2/0)
- Petter Andersson – FC Midtjylland – 2012–16 (73/19)
- Gregor Andrijevski – Odense BK – 1999–2000 (16/1)
- Tomas Antonelius – FCK – 2001–03 (27/0)
- Mikael Antonsson – FCK – 2007–11 (86/2), 2014–18 (45/0)
- Kristoffer Arvhage – AaB – 2004–05 (11/1)
- Jeffrey Aubynn – AGF – 2003–05 (29/4)
- Ludwig Augustinsson – FCK – 2014–17 (78/3)
- Andreas Augustsson – AC Horsens – 2008–09 (14/1) 2010–11 (18/0)
- Niklas Backman – AGF – 2015–21 (95/3)
- Roony Bardghji – FCK – 2021–25 (60/12)
- **Felix Beijmo** – AGF, **FCK** – 2022–26 (103/6), 2026– (1/0)
- Patrick Bengtsson – Herfølge BK – 2000–01 (6/0)
- Pierre Bengtsson – FC Nordsjælland, FCK, Vejle BK, – 2009–11 (39/1), 2011–14 (109/2) 2017–22 (81/2), 2020–21 (14/0)
- Erik Berg – FCK – 2015–18 (52/3)
- Fredrik Berglund – Esbjerg fB, FCK – 2003–06 (75/43), 2006–07 (29/7)
- Filip Bergman – AGF – 1999–2000 (4/0)
- Billy Berntsson – Herfølge BK – 2003–05 (18/0)
- Jonas Bjurström – Esbjerg fB – 2006–08 (10/0)
- Fredrik Björck – Esbjerg fB – 2007–10 (56/3)
- Carl Björk – Brøndby IF – 2021–23 (14/0)
- **John Björkengren** – **Randers FC** – 2023– (91/5)
- Lukas Björklund – SønderjyskE – 2024–26 (35/2)
- Andreas Blomqvist – AaB – 2014–15 (1/0)
- Mikael Boman – Randers FC – 2017–19 (25/1)
- Samuel Brolin – AC Horsens – 2022–23 (3/0)
- Franz Brorsson – Esbjerg fB – 2019–20 (7/1)
- Jens Cajuste – FC Midtjylland – 2018–22 (58/2)
- Patrik Carlgren – FC Nordsjælland, Randers FC – 2016–17 (5/0), 2018–24 (195/0)
- Nicklas Carlsson – AGF – 2003–05 (41/0)
- Viktor Claesson – FCK – 2021–26 (124/31)
- Kevin Čustović – Vejle BK – 2021–22 (14/0)
- Andreas Dahl – FC Nordsjælland – 2007–09 (38/1)
- Henrik Dahl – Silkeborg IF – 2002–03 (14/2)
- Johan Dahlin – FC Midtjylland – 2014–17 (39/0)
- Bobbie Friberg da Cruz – Randers FC – 2008–10 (24/0)
- Bojan Djordjic – AGF – 2002–03 (25/0)
- Dusan Djuric – Odense BK – 2013–14 (2/0)
- Hans Eklund – Viborg FF – 1998–2001 (51/21)
- Johan Elmander – Brøndby IF – 2004–06 (58/22), 2014–16 (48/6)
- Martin Ericsson – AaB, Brøndby IF – 2003–06 (63/16), 2005–09 (83/19)
- Magnus Eriksson – Brøndby IF – 2015–16 (22/1)
- William Eskelinen – AGF – 2019–21 (33/0)
- Ken Fagerberg – FC Midtjylland, AC Horsens, Viborg FF – 2007–11 (45/6), 2011–13 (30/5), 2013–14 (2/0) 13 (30/5), 2013–14 (2/0)
- Per Fahlström – Lyngby BK – 1998–2002 (86/0)
- Oskar Fallenius – Brøndby IF – 2020–22 (10/0)
- Alexander Farnerud – Brøndby IF – 2008–11 (73/18)
- Erik Friberg – Esbjerg fB – 2014–15 (13/1)
- Martin Fribrock – Esbjerg fB – 2008–09 (4/0)
- Melvin Frithzell – FC Helsingør – 2017–18 (3/1)
- Robert Gojani – Silkeborg IF – 2021–23 (31/0)
- Tobias Grahn – Lyngby BK, AGF, Odense BK, Randers FC – 1999–2002(36/2), 2004–06 (47/10), 2006–07 (15/6), 2008–10 (19/0)
- Markus Gustafsson – Viborg FF – 2013–14 (3/0)
- Lucas Hägg-Johansson – Vejle BK – 2021–22 (1/0)
- Melker Hallberg – Vejle BK – 2018–19 (25/1)
- Simon Hedlund – Brøndby IF – 2018–24 (133/23)
- Filip Helander – Odense BK – 2023–24 (22/1)
- **Axel Henriksson** – **Randers FC** – 2026– (1/0)
- Richard Henriksson – AGF – 2005–06 (3/0)
- **Adam Herdonsson** – **AC Horsens** – 2026– (1/0)
- Oscar Hiljemark – AaB – 2020–21 (11/1)
- Daniel Hoch – AaB – 2005–06 (4/1)
- Markus Holgersson – AaB – 2016–17 (27/2)
- Emil Holm – SønderjyskE – 2020–22 (39/6)
- Samuel Holmén – Brøndby IF – 2007–10 (83/13)
- Mikael Ishak – Randers FC – 2014–17 (71/31)
- Andreas Jakobsson – Brøndby IF – 2003–05 (37/5)
- Andreas Johansson – AaB, Odense BK – 2007–10 (93/21), 2010–13 (69/10)
- Carl Johansson – Randers FC – 2022–23 (13/1)
- Karl-Johan Johnsson – Randers FC, FCK – 2014–16 (64/0), 2019–21 (52/0) 2022–23 (4/0)
- Mattias Jonson – Brøndby IF – 1999-05 (131/40)
- Jon Jönsson – Brøndby IF – 2008–10 (24/2)
- **Melker Jonsson** – **Silkeborg IF** – 2025– (2/0)
- Rasmus Jönsson – AaB, Odense BK – 2013–16 (75/18), 2016–18 (56/8)
- Alexander Kačaniklić – FCK – 2014–15 (7/2)
- **Eric Kahl** – **AGF** – 2021– (142/3)
- Christian Karlsson – Esbjerg fB, AB – 2001–02 (29/4), 2002–04 (40/1)
- Imad Khalili – Randers FC – 2006–07 (2/0)
- Benjamin Kibebe – FC Nordsjælland, FC Midtjylland – 2008–10 (56/1), 2012–13 (9/0)
- Magnus Kihlstedt – FCK – 2001–05 (69/0)
- Andreas Klarström – Esbjerg fB – 2005–10 (127/1)
- Simon Kroon – SønderjyskE, FC Midtjylland – 2015–18 (44/7), 2016–18 (11/1)
- Jones Kusi-Asare – Esbjerg fB, AaB – 2008–10 (9/0), 2010–11 (3/0)
- Mayckel Lahdo – Brøndby IF – 2025–26 (10/1)
- Valentino Lai – Vejle BK – 2008–09 (27/2)
- Marcus Lantz – Brøndby IF – 2005–08 (57/2)
- Daniel Larsson – Esbjerg fB – 2014–15 (14/2)
- Johan Larsson – Brøndby IF – 2014–20 (146/13)
- **Jordan Larsson** – **FCK** – 2022– (87/27)
- Peter Larsson – FCK – 2008–10 (20/0), 2011–12 (4/0)
- Dick Last – Vejle BK – 1999–2000 (6/0)
- Rawez Lawan – AC Horsens, FC Nordsjælland – 2006–09 (83/14), 2009–12 (85/13)
- Tobias Linderoth – FCK – 2004–07 (82/4)
- Mattias Lindström – AaB – 2004–08 (88/9)
- Jesper Ljung – Vejle BK – 1998–2000 (39/3)
- David Löfquist – Odense BK – 2012–14 (13/0)
- Johnny Lundberg – FC Nordsjælland – 2006–09 (81/4)
- Viktor Lundberg – Randers FC – 2013–17 (119/24)
- Sam Lundholm – Randers FC – 2016–17 (1/0)
- Shkodran Maholli – Silkeborg IF – 2019–20 (16/2)
- Elison Makolli – AaB – 2024–25 (3/0)
- Jozo Matovac – AaB – 1998–2000 (61/3)
- Olof Mellberg – FCK – 2013–14 (22/3)
- Alexander Milošević – Vejle BK – 2020–21 (10/0)
- Marko Mitrović – Randers FC, SønderjyskE – 2016–17 (10/0), 2016–18 (12/1)
- Erik Moberg – Viborg FF – 2016–17 (11/0)
- David Moberg Karlsson – FC Nordsjælland – 2014–16 (48/5)
- Diego Montiel – Vejle BK – 2020–21 (12/0)
- Marokhy Ndione – Viborg FF – 2021–23 (7/0)
- Gustaf Nilsson – Brøndby IF, Silkeborg IF, Vejle BK – 2016–17 (11/1), 2017–18 (26/4), 2018–19 (19/2)
- Lasse Nilsson – AaB – 2007–08 (12/2)
- Mikael Nilsson – Brøndby IF – 2009–12 (77/3)
- Per Nilsson – FCK – 2014–16 (21/0)
- Krister Nordin – Brøndby IF – 1999–2002 (58/4)
- Benjamin Nygren – FC Nordsjælland – 2021–25 (87/25)
- Lucas Ohlander – FC Helsingør – 2017–18 (3/0)
- Robin Olsen – FCK – 2015–18 (71/0)
- Kristoffer Olsson – FC Midtjylland – 2014–17 (50/2) 2022–24 (37/5)
- **Benjamin Örn** – **Randers FC** – 2025– (6/0)
- Alexander Östlund – Esbjerg fB – 2008–09 (6/0)
- Sotirios Papagiannopoulos – FCK – 2018–20 (45/0)
- Johan Persson – Esbjerg fB – 2010–11 (4/0)
- Jörgen Pettersson – FCK – 2002–04 (32/6)
- Pablo Piñones-Arce – Vejle BK – 2006–07 (10/7), 2008–09 (10/1)
- Marcus Pode – FC Nordsjælland – 2007–09 (15/1)
- Rade Prica – AaB – 2006–08 (48/28)
- Tim Prica – AaB – 2020–22 (42/6)
- Anders Prytz – Lyngby BK – 1997–98 (4/0)
- Marino Rahmberg – Lyngby BK – 1995–96 (6/1)
- Jacob Rinne – AaB – 2017–22 (162/0)
- Fredrik Risp – Esbjerg fB – 2010–11 (22/0)
- **Pontus Rödin** – **Silkeborg IF** – 2023– (27/2)
- Mikael Rosén – Viborg FF – 2003–06 (77/3)
- Björn Runström – Odense BK – 2008–10 (30/7)
- Mikael Rynell – Esbjerg fB – 2008–11 (22/0)
- Klebér Saarenpää – AaB, Vejle BK – 2000–04 (37/1), 2006–07 (10/2)
- Dan Sahlin – AaB – 1998–99 (5/2)
- Tobias Sana – AGF – 2017–20 (68/15)
- Max von Schlebrügge – Brøndby IF – 2007–12 (86/7)
- Pontus Segerström – Odense BK – 2004–05 (8/0)
- Johannes Selvén – Odense BK – 2023–24 (9/1)
- Pascal Simpson – FCK – 2000–02 (23/3)
- Robin Söder – Esbjerg fB – 2014–17 (61/18)
- Jonas Stark – BK Frem – 2003–04 (9/0)
- Babis Stefanidis – Brøndby IF – 2004–05 (15/1)
- Fredrik Stoor – Viborg FF – 2013–14 (3/0)
- Daniel Svensson – FC Nordsjælland – 2020–25 (127/7)
- Magnus Svensson – Brøndby IF – 1999–2002 (57/1)
- Simon Tibbling – Brøndby IF, Randers FC – 2017–20 (90/9), 2021–22 (26/0)
- Ola Tidman – FC Midtjylland – 2004–06 (19/0)
- Mattias Thylander – Silkeborg IF – 2004–05 (14/1)
- Martin Ulander – AGF – 2003–05 (21/0)
- Johan Vahlqvist – Lyngby BK – 1997–98 (10/1)
- Jean-Paul Vonderburg – AGF – 1992–93 (5/1)
- Erik Wahlstedt – Esbjerg fB – 2001–04 (79/1)
- Leopold Wahlstedt – AGF – 2024–26 (5/0)
- Oscar Wendt – FCK – 2006–11 (138/6)
- Melker Widell – AaB – 2024–25 (27/3)
- Adam Wikman – Silkeborg IF – 2025–26 (13/0)
- Magnus Wikström – Vejle BK – 1996–97 (5/0)
- Rasmus Wikström – Brøndby IF – 2021–22 (1/0)
- Johan Wiland – FCK – 2008–14 (142/0)
- Oliver Zandén – Randers FC – 2023–25 (13/0)
- Robert Åhman-Persson – Viborg FF – 2007–08 (27/0)
- Martin Åslund – Viborg FF – 2005–08 (56/4)

=== Switzerland ===
- **Nicolas Bürgy** – Viborg FF, **Odense BK** – 2021–25 (80/5), 2025– (28/2)
- Johan Djourou – FC Nordsjælland – 2020–21 (11/0)
- Stefan Gartenmann – SønderjyskE, FC Midtjylland – 2017–22 (150/8), 2022–24 (29/3)
- **Kevin Mbabu** – **FC Midtjylland** – 2024– (48/2)
- Brandon Onkony – Hobro IK – 2019–20 (12/0)
- Arlet Junior Zé – FC Midtjylland – 2025–26 (1/0)

=== Turkey ===
- Mustafa Gönden – AB – 2004–05 (1/0)
- Emre Mor – FC Nordsjælland – 2015–16 (13/2)
- Aral Şimşir – FC Midtjylland – 2019–20 (3/0) 2021–26 (95/19)
- Ertuğrul Tekşen – Lyngby BK – 2019–21 (7/0)

=== Ukraine ===
- Artem Dovbyk – FC Midtjylland, SønderjyskE – 2017–20 (18/1), 2019–20 (18/2)
- Serhiy Hryn – Vejle BK – 2018–19 (7/2) 2020–21 (1/0)
- Maksym Koval – Odense BK – 2015–16 (10/0)
- Miro Slavov – Vendsyssel FF – 2018–19 (4/0)
- Yuriy Yakovenko – Esbjerg fB – 2018–20 (52/14)
- Vladlen Yurchenko – Vejle BK – 2018–19 (16/3)

== North America (CONCACAF) ==
=== Aruba ===
- Joshua John – FC Nordsjælland – 2012–17 (97/25)

=== Canada ===
- Patrice Bernier – FC Nordsjælland, Lyngby BK – 2008–11 (76/3), 2011–12 (12/2)
- Adrian Cann – Esbjerg fB – 2008–10 (14/0)
- **Simon Colyn** – **Lyngby BK** – 2026– (1/1)
- Charles Gbeke – Herfølge BK – 2004–05 (8/0)
- Ali Gerba – AC Horsens – 2006–07 (15/4)
- Doneil Henry – AC Horsens – 2016–17 (4/0)
- Atiba Hutchinson – FCK – 2005–10 (139/22)
- Manjrekar James – FC Midtjylland, Vejle BK – 2018–21 (14/0), 2021–22 (13/0)
- Alen Marcina – Herfølge BK – 2004–05 (1/0)
- Issey Nakajima-Farran – Vejle BK, FC Nordsjælland, AC Horsens – 2006–07 (29/6), 2007–09 (46/8), 2010–12 (31/5)
- Andrew Ornoch – Esbjerg fB – 2007–09 (13/1)
- Marco Reda – AaB – 2004–06 (20/0)
- Josh Wagenaar – Lyngby BK – 2007–08 (2/0)

=== Costa Rica ===
- Christian Bolaños – Odense BK, FCK – 2007–09 (24/3), 2010–14 (101/14)
- Francisco Calvo – FC Nordsjælland – 2012–13 (3/0)
- Mayron George – Hobro IK, Randers FC, Lyngby Boldklub, FC Midtjylland – 2015–16 (24/9), 2016–18 (22/2), 2017–18 (22/7), 2018–19 (25/4)
- Dennis Marshall – AaB – 2009–11 (18/1)
- **Kenay Myrie** – **FCK** – 2025– (2/0)
- Bryan Oviedo – FCK, FC Nordsjælland – 2009–13 (30/2) 2019–21 (22/0), 2010–11 (14/0)
- Marco Ureña – FC Midtjylland, Brøndby IF – 2014–16 (29/5), 2016–17 (13/0)

=== Curaçao ===
- Nigel Thomas – Viborg FF – 2023–24 (16/1)

=== Guatemala ===
- Rubio Rubin – Silkeborg IF – 2016–17 (3/0)

=== Guyana ===
- Matthew Briggs – Vejle BK – 2020–21 (3/0)
- **Osaze De Rosario** – **SønderjyskE** – 2026– (1/1)

=== Haiti ===
- Louicius Don Deedson – Hobro IK, Odense BK – 2019–20 (7/1), 2023–24 (27/8)
- Peguero Jean Philippe – Brøndby IF – 2006–07 (3/2)
- Jeppe Simonsen – SønderjyskE – 2014–22 (105/7) 2024–25 (4/0)

=== Jamaica ===
- Rodolph Austin – Brøndby IF, Esbjerg fB – 2015–17 (40/2), 2018–20 (48/5)
- Norman Campbell – Randers FC – 2024–26 (43/9)
- Steven Morrissey – Silkeborg IF – 2012–13 (1/0)
- Luton Shelton – AaB – 2008–09 (11/1)

=== Mexico ===
- **Rodrigo Huescas** – **FCK** – 2024– (29/1)

=== Suriname ===
- **Jay-Roy Grot** – Viborg FF, **Odense BK** – 2021–23 (43/14), 2025– (29/7)
- **Sean Klaiber** – **Brøndby IF** – 2023– (62/4)
- Ramon Leeuwin – Odense BK – 2018–20 (40/2)
- Justin Lonwijk – Viborg FF – 2021–23 (38/5) 2024–25 (20/1)

=== Trinidad and Tobago ===
- **Roald Mitchell** – **Viborg FF** – 2026– (1/0)

=== United States ===
- Seyi Adekoya – Vendsyssel FF – 2018–19 (14/1)
- Jonathan Amon – FC Nordsjælland, Lygnby BK, Vejle BK – 2017–21 (38/7), 2023–25 (48/3), 2025–26 (10/0)
- **Markus Anderson** – **Lyngby BK** – 2026– (2/0)
- Wade Barrett – AGF – 2002–04 (31/0)
- **Gavin Beavers** – **Brøndby IF** – 2024– (3/0)
- Mike Burns – Viborg FF – 1995–96 (15/0)
- Danny Califf – AaB, FC Midtjylland – 2005–08 (69/1), 2008–10 (31/1)
- Christian Cappis – Hobro IK, Brøndby IF – 2018–20 (33/1), 2021–25 (49/6)
- Justin Che – Brøndby IF – 2024–25 (1/0)
- Steve Clark – AC Horsens – 2016–17 (11/0)
- Charlie Davies – Randers FC – 2012–13 (23/0)
- Derk Droze – Lyngby BK – 1997–98 (1/0)
- Benny Feilhaber – AGF – 2008–10 (36/1)
- George Fochive – Viborg FF – 2015–17 (20/0)
- Jose Gallegos – SønderjyskE – 2021–22 (13/1) 2024–25 (15/1)
- Clarence Goodson – Brøndby IF – 2010–13 (60/6)
- Geoffrey Gray – Odense BK – 1991–92 (23/0)
- Mike Grella – Viborg FF – 2013–14 (2/0)
- Bill Hamid – FC Midtjylland – 2017–18 (1/0)
- **Matthew Hoppe** – **SønderjyskE** – 2024– (33/6)
- Milan Iloski – FC Nordsjælland – 2024–26 (17/2)
- Andres Jasson – AaB – 2024–25 (31/1)
- Aron Jóhannsson – AGF – 2011–13 (48/21)
- Will John – Randers FC – 2007–08 (1/0)
- Matt Jordan – Odense BK – 2003–04 (2/0)
- Perry Kitchen – Randers FC – 2017–18 (17/0)
- **Diego Kochen** – **Lyngby BK** – 2026– (1/0)
- Michael Lansing – AC Horsens – 2019–20 (14/0)
- Kristoffer Lund – FC Midtjylland – 2020–21 (1/0)
- Yuri Morales – Viborg FF – 2004–05 (3/1)
- Lee Nguyen – Randers FC – 2007–09 (9/0)
- Conor O'Brien – SønderjyskE, FC Nordsjælland, Odense BK, AC Horsens – 2011–13 (45/7), 2012–14 (14/1), 2013–15 (16/0), 2016–17 (31/1)
- Babajide Ogunbiyi – Viborg FF, Hobro IK – 2013–14 (27/2) 2015–16 (4/0), 2015–16 (14/1)
- Will Orben – FCK, Viborg FF – 1999–2000 (3/0), 2000–01 (3/0)
- Michael Parkhurst – FC Nordsjælland – 2008–13 (107/3)
- Heath Pearce – FC Nordsjælland – 2004–07 (75/2)
- Chris Rolfe – AaB – 2009–12 (35/6)
- Brad Rusin – HB Køge – 2011–12 (23/2)
- Robbie Russell – Viborg FF – 2006–08 (29/0)
- Emmanuel Sabbi – Hobro IK – 2017–20 (73/13) – Odense BK – 2020–23 (78/16)
- Yosef Samuel – Hobro IK – 2019–20 (5/0)
- Gregory Schwager – Vejle BK – 1997–98 (9/1)
- A. J. Soares – AGF – 2016–17 (6/1)
- Marcus Tracy – AaB – 2008–10 (15/2)
- Jeremiah White – AGF – 2007–10 (71/6)
- Peter Woodring – AaB – 1993–95 (22/2)
- Haji Wright – SønderjyskE – 2020–21 (29/11)
- Joe Zewe – Viborg FF – 2006–07 (4/0)

=== U.S. Virgin Islands ===
- Jannick Liburd – SønderjyskE – 2019–21 (2/0)

== Oceania (OFC) ==
=== New Zealand ===
- Joe Bell – Brøndby IF – 2021–24 (34/0)
- **Callum McCowatt** – Silkeborg IF, **AGF** – 2023–26 (92/24), 2026– (1/0)
- Elijah Just – AC Horsens – 2022–23 (27/0)
- Winston Reid – FC Midtjylland – 2005–11 (84/2)
- Marco Rojas – SønderjyskE – 2018–20 (30/3)
- Marko Stamenić – FCK – 2020–21 (1/0) 2022–23 (15/0)
- **Dalton Wilkins** – **SønderjyskE** – 2024– (16/0)

== South America (CONMEBOL) ==
=== Argentina ===
- **Maher Carrizo** – **FCK** – 2026– (1/1)
- Franco Mussis – FCK – 2014–15 (1/0)
- Mauricio Ortiz – AGF – 2003–04 (2/1)
- Alexander Szymanowski – Brøndby IF – 2013–16 (51/6)
- Santiago Villafañe – FC Midtjylland – 2012–13 (11/0)

=== Brazil ===
- Aílton – FCK – 2006–11 (93/21)
- Ailton – FC Midtjylland – 2020–21 (8/0)
- Alex – Silkeborg IF – 2017–18 (1/0)
- Alvaro – FCK – 2003–07 (84/38)
- Thiago Junio de Aquino – AaB – 2003–04 (1/0)
- Baré – Vejle BK – 2001–02 (10/3)
- Bruno Batata – Brøndby IF – 2010–11 (4/1)
- Bechara – Odense BK, Vejle BK – 2006–08 (37/8), 2008–09 (2/0)
- Marcelo de Souza Braga – Esbjerg fB – 1999–2000 (7/0)
- Washington Brandão – Vendsyssel FF – 2018–19 (16/1)
- **Júnior Brumado** – **FC Midtjylland**, Silkeborg IF – 2018–24 (70/10) 2025– (21/5), 2019–20 (9/2)
- Bruninho – FC Nordsjælland, FC Midtjylland – 2015–16 (15/9), 2016–17 (11/0)
- Ricardo Bueno – FC Nordsjælland – 2012–13 (10/0)
- Cacá – AaB, Odense BK – 2005–09 (64/14), 2009–11 (35/3)
- Charles – FC Midtjylland – 2021–24 (70/5)
- Claudemir – FCK – 2010–15 (131/10)
- Luiz Carlos – Viborg FF – 2007–08 (5/2)
- Chrys – AaB – 2006–08 (11/1)
- Eduardo Delani – Vejle BK – 2008–09 (29/4)
- Dominic Vinicius – Vejle – 2021–22 (1/0)
- Evander – FC Midtjylland – 2019–23 (123/39)
- Fabinho – Randers FC, HB Køge – 2006–08 (38/7), 2009–10 (24/3) 2011–12 (10/0)
- Wílton Figueiredo – Viborg FF – 2013–14 (14/1)
- **Giulio** – **Viborg FF** – 2026– (1/0)
- Heron – Vejle BK – 2021–22 (16/0)
- Juninho – FC Midtjylland – 2021–25 (78/3)
- Junior – Odense BK, FCK, FC Nordsjælland, Randers FC – 2005–06 (16/9), 2007–09 (17/6), 2008–09 (11/5), 2009–10 (10/1)
- Kayke – AaB – 2010–13 (32/6)
- Leandro – SønderjyskE – 2005–06 (4/1)
- Matheus Leiria – FC Helsingør – 2017–18 (20/1)
- Luís Henrique – Vejle BK – 2020–21 (5/0)
- Gilberto Macena – AC Horsens – 2006–09 (92/33) 2010–12 (50/19)
- Marrony – FC Midtjylland – 2021–22 (7/0) 2023–24 (3/0)
- Tulio de Melo – AaB – 2004–05 (19/6)
- Douglas Mineiro – FC Helsingør – 2017–18 (10/0)
- José Mota – Randers FC, Viborg FF, AaB – 2004–05 (13/6), 2004–07 (48/34), 2006–08 (12/0)
- Paulinho – FC Midtjylland – 2019–26 (150/5)
- **Gabriel Pereira** – **FCK** – 2024– (52/4)
- Ramón – FC Nordsjælland, SønderjyskE – 2015–17 (29/1), 2016–18 (28/0)
- Régis – Viborg FF – 2006–07 (10/0)
- Renato Júnior – Viborg FF – 2022–25 (62/5)
- **Robert** – **FCK** – 2024– (38/6)
- César Santin – FCK – 2008–14 (161/65)
- Alex José dos Santos – BK Frem – 2003–04 (2/0)
- Saraiva – HB Køge – 2009–10 (9/0)
- Alex da Silva – Randers FC, Viborg FF – 2006–08 (28/3), 2007–08 (7/0)
- Marcelo Oliveira da Silva – AaB – 2004–05 (3/0)
- Ricardo Silva – AGF – 2000–01 (1/0)
- Vragel da Silva – Brøndby IF – 1998–2000 (36/6)
- Rodolfo Soares – Vejle BK – 2006–07 (6/0)
- Allan Sousa – Vejle BK, AaB – 2018–19 (27/10) 2020–22 (58/12), 2022–23 (27/8)
- Jairo Antonio de Souza – BK Frem – 2003–04 (16/1)
- Thiago – Esbjerg fB, FC Vestsjælland – 2006–09 (16/1), 2013–15 (23/3)
- Felipe Tontini – FC Helsingør – 2017–18 (7/2)
- Vágner Love – FC Midtjylland – 2021–22 (9/1)
- Wellington – AaB – 2004–05 (3/0)

=== Chile ===
- Miiko Albornoz – Vejle BK – 2021–22 (13/1) 2023–25 (31/0)
- **Darío Osorio** – **FC Midtjylland** – 2023– (75/17)

=== Colombia ===
- **Pedro Bravo** – **FC Midtjylland** – 2024– (51/2)
- John Jairo Mosquera – SønderjyskE – 2005–06 (7/1), 2008–09 (18/3)
- Pablo Ortiz – FC Midtjylland – 2023–24 (3/0)

=== Ecuador ===
- **Denil Castillo** – **FC Midtjylland** – 2024– (48/4)

=== Paraguay ===
- José Ariel Núñez – Brøndby IF – 2013–15 (27/9)
- Blas Riveros – Brøndby IF – 2020–24 (49/1)
- Federico Santander – FCK – 2015–18 (82/38)

=== Peru ===
- Edison Flores – AaB – 2016–18 (47/2)
- **Marcos López** – **FCK** – 2024– (46/1)
- Oliver Sonne – Silkeborg IF – 2021–25 (71/8)

=== Uruguay ===
- Emiliano Martínez – FC Midtjylland – 2022–25 (56/0)
- Michael Santos – FCK – 2019–20 (23/7)
- Guillermo Varela – FCK – 2018–21 (35/0)

=== Venezuela ===
- **David Martínez** – **FC Midtjylland** – 2026– (2/0)
- Andrés Ponce – Vejle BK – 2021–22 (25/1)
- Rafael Romo – Silkeborg IF – 2019–20 (23/0)

== Notes ==
1. Born in Angola
2. Born in Azerbaijan (then part of the Soviet Union)
3. Born in Belgium
4. Born in Bermuda
5. Born in Bosnia and Herzegovina (then part of SFR Yugoslavia)
6. Born in Cameroon
7. Born in Croatia
8. Born in Denmark
9. Born in Dominica
10. Born in England
11. Born in Ethiopia
12. Born in France
13. Born in Germany
14. Born in Ghana
15. Born in Guinea
16. Born in Iran
17. Born in Italy
18. Born in the Ivory Coast
19. Born in Jamaica
20. Born in Kenya
21. Born in Kuwait
22. Born in Lebanon
23. Born in Mali
24. Born in Morocco
25. Born in the Netherlands
26. Born in Norway
27. Born in Pakistan
28. Born in Portugal
29. Born in Senegal
30. Born in Serbia (then part of FR Yugoslavia)
31. Born in Slovakia
32. Born in Slovakia (then part of Czechoslovakia)
33. Born in Spain
34. Born in Suriname
35. Born in Sweden
36. Born in Switzerland
37. Born in Turkmenistan
38. Born in Ukraine
39. Born in the United States of America
40. Capped for the Albania national football team
41. Capped for the Albania national under-21 football team
42. Capped for the Belgium national under-21 football team
43. Capped for the Belgium national under-20 football team
44. Capped for the Belgium national under-19 football team
45. Capped for the Belgium national under-18 football team
46. Capped for the Belgium national under-17 football team
47. Capped for the Bermuda national under-17 football team
48. Capped for the Bermuda national under-15 football team
49. Capped for the Catalonia national football team
50. Capped for the Denmark League XI national football team
51. Capped for the Denmark men's Olympic football team
52. Capped for the Denmark national under-21 football team
53. Capped for the Denmark national under-20 football team
54. Capped for the Denmark national under-19 football team
55. Capped for the Denmark national under-18 football team
56. Capped for the Denmark national under-17 football team
57. Capped for the Denmark national under-16 football team
58. Capped for the England national under-21 football team
59. Capped for the England national under-20 football team
60. Capped for the England national under-19 football team
61. Capped for the England national under-18 football team
62. Capped for the England national under-17 football team
63. Capped for the England national under-16 football team
64. Capped for the France national under-20 football team
65. Capped for the France national under-18 football team
66. Capped for the France national under-17 football team
67. Capped for the Germany national under-21 football team
68. Capped for the Germany national under-19 football team
69. Capped for the Germany national under-18 football team
70. Capped for the Germany national under-17 football team
71. Capped for the Germany national under-16 football team
72. Capped for the Germany national under-15 football team
73. Capped for the Iceland national under-21 football team
74. Capped for the Kosovo national under-21 football team
75. Capped for the Kosovo national under-19 football team
76. Capped for the Netherlands national under-21 football team
77. Capped for the Netherlands national under-20 football team
78. Capped for the Netherlands national under-19 football team
79. Capped for the Netherlands national under-18 football team
80. Capped for the Netherlands national under-17 football team
81. Capped for the Netherlands national under-16 football team
82. Capped for the Netherlands national under-15 football team
83. Capped for the Norway national under-21 football team
84. Capped for the Norway national under-20 football team
85. Capped for the Norway national under-19 football team
86. Capped for the Norway national under-18 football team
87. Capped for the Norway national under-17 football team
88. Capped for the Norway national under-16 football team
89. Capped for the Portugal national under-23 football team
90. Capped for the Portugal national under-21 football team
91. Capped for the Portugal national under-19 football team
92. Capped for the Scotland national under-18 football team
93. Capped for the Singapore national under-21 football team
94. Capped for the Sweden national football team
95. Capped for the Sweden national under-21 football team
96. Capped for the Sweden national under-19 football team
97. Capped for the Sweden national under-17 football team
98. Capped for the Ukraine national under-17 football team
99. Capped for the United States national football team
100. Capped for the United States national under-23 football team
101. Capped for the United States national under-20 football team
102. Capped for the United States national under-17 football team

== Sources ==
- DanskFodbold.com by Danish Football Association
- SuperStats.dk foreign players statistics
