= Lauser =

Lauser is a surname of German origin with several possible meanings. Notable people with the surname include:

- David Lauser (born 1951), American rock drummer
- Jessica Lauser (born 1980), American chess player
- Steffen Lauser (born 1984), German former professional footballer
