= Mustafa Amini =

Australian soccer player (born 1993)

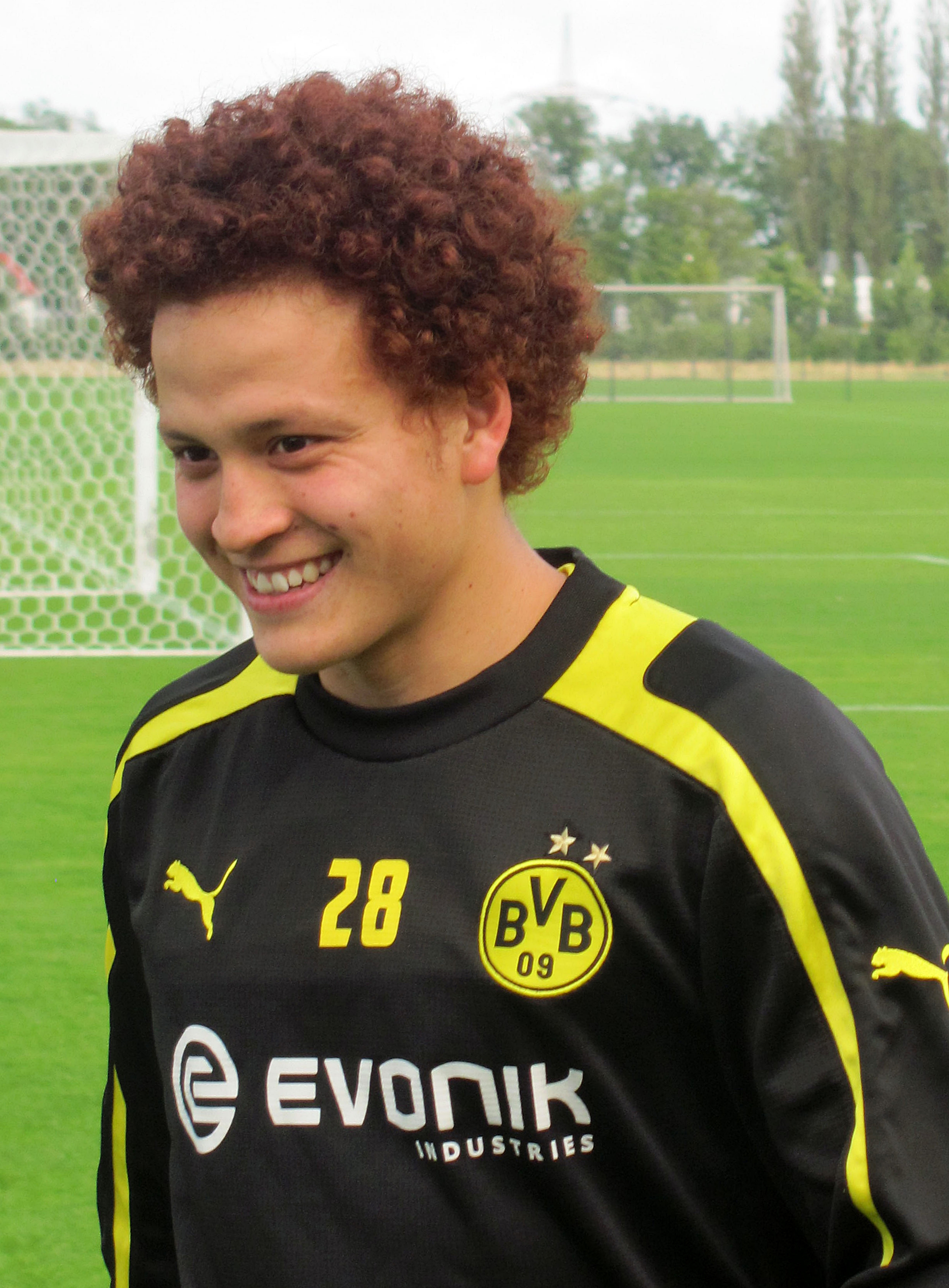
- Amini with Borussia Dortmund in 2012

Personal information
- Full name: Mohammad Mustafa Amini Castillo
- Date of birth: 20 April 1993 (age 33)
- Place of birth: Sydney, Australia
- Height: 1.73 m (5 ft 8 in)
- Position: Central midfielder

Team information
- Current team: Nakhon Si United
- Number: 88

Youth career
- 2004–2008: Blacktown City
- 2009–2010: AIS

Senior career*
Years	Team	Apps	(Gls)
2010–2011	Central Coast Mariners	23	(1)
2011–2015	Borussia Dortmund	0	(0)
2011–2012	→ Central Coast Mariners (loan)	18	(2)
2012–2015	Borussia Dortmund II	57	(3)
2015–2016	Randers FC	29	(0)
2016–2020	AGF	119	(10)
2021	Apollon Limassol	0	(0)
2021	→ PAEEK (loan)	0	(0)
2022	Sydney FC	17	(1)
2022–2024	Perth Glory	36	(2)
2026–	Nakhon Si United	12	(0)

International career^{‡}
2009	Australia U17	2	(0)
2010–2013	Australia U20	23	(3)
2011–2016	Australia U23	18	(4)
2017–2019	Australia	8	(0)
Medal record
Representing Australia
Men's Association football
AFC U-20 Asian Cup
Runner-up	2010 China
- * Club domestic league appearances and goals as of 15 March 2026 ‡ National team caps and goals as of 20 November 2024

Mohammad Mustafa Amini Castillo (Dari: محمد مصطفی امينى كاستيلو, born 20 April 1993), known as Mustafa Amini, is an Australian professional soccer player who plays as a midfielder for Thai League 2 club Nakhon Si United. He has been capped by the Australian national team.

Born in Sydney, Amini played youth football with the Australian Institute of Sport before starting his professional career with Central Coast Mariners in the A-League. In 2011, Amini signed for Bundesliga club Borussia Dortmund. After playing only for their second team, he transferred in 2015 to Randers FC.

Amini has appeared numerous times for the Australian U-17, U-20 and U-23 teams. He took part in the 2011 FIFA U-20 World Cup.

== Early life ==
Born in Sydney, Australia to an Afghan father and a Nicaraguan mother, Amini grew up in the Western Sydney area. He attended Wentworthville Public School and Westfields Sports High School until moving to Lake Ginninderra College in the ACT while playing for the AIS, earning his Year 12 certificate in March 2010.

Amini wears a distinctive 'afro' haircut and is fluent in Dari and Spanish.

== Playing career ==
=== Club career ===
==== Central Coast Mariners ====
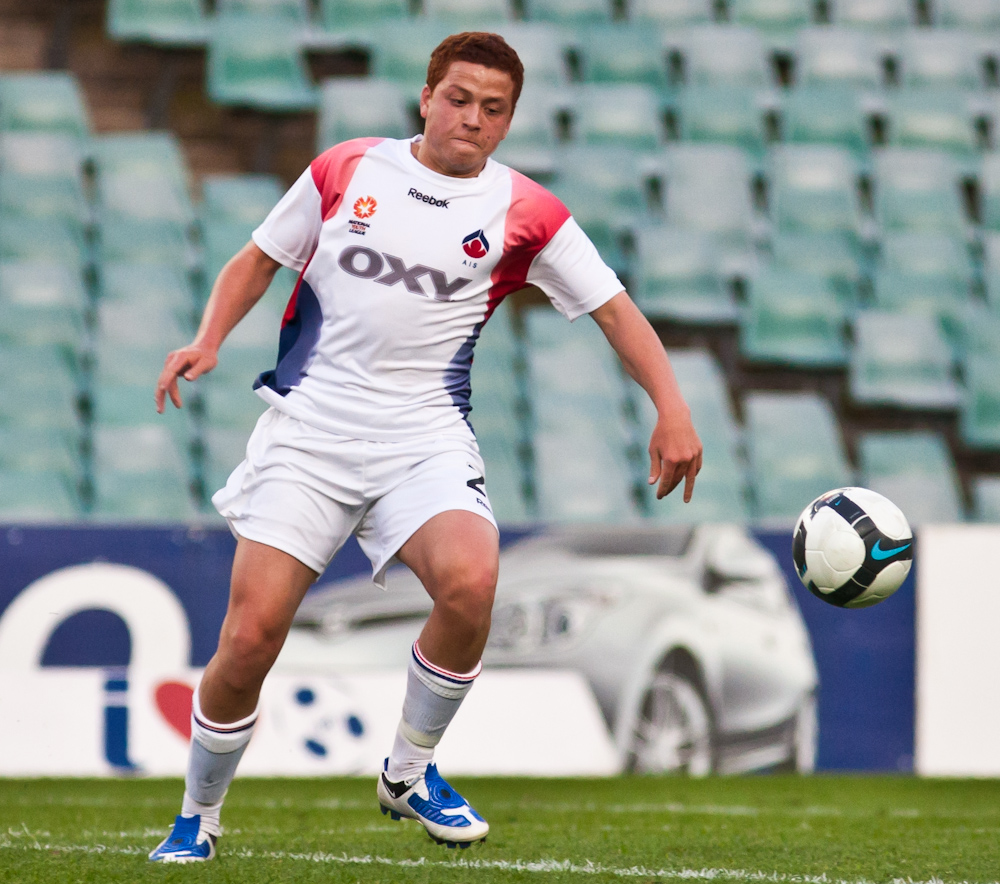
Amini playing for the AIS

Amini played for Blacktown City before being signed to an AIS scholarship. He was signed by the Central Coast Mariners on a two-year contract in the A-League. Amini made his debut for the senior team in a friendly against fellow Gosford club Central Coast Lightning which the Mariners won 7–1. Amini made his official A-League debut for the Mariners in a match against Brisbane Roar on 20 October 2010. His first goal came in a 3–1 away win against Gold Coast United on 9 February 2011.

Amini's excellent form throughout the 2010–11 A-League season attracted major interest from overseas clubs Borussia Dortmund and Bayern Munich. Subsequently it was announced that Amini was to spend two weeks on trial with Borussia Dortmund in preparation for the 2011 FIFA U-20 World Cup in July with a view of signing a long term deal with the Bundesliga club. Only days into his trial Borussia Dortmund publicly announced that the youngster had caught the eye of first team manager Jürgen Klopp stating that "he can definitely play football and is a really great talent."

==== Borussia Dortmund ====
On 4 July 2011, it was announced that he had signed with Bundesliga club Borussia Dortmund on a four-year contract. However, Amini would initially be loaned to Central Coast Mariners until 31 May 2012, making him eligible to play for the club during the 2011–12 A-League season as well as the group stage of the Asian Champions League. He played outstandingly well as Central Coast marched to the quarter-finals.

On 11 July 2012, Amini made his debut for Borussia Dortmund in a friendly against SV Meppen, scoring a goal in the 63rd minute en route a 2–1 victory for Dortmund. Amini scored his first goal for the second team in a game against MSV Duisburg on matchday 7 of the 2013–14 3. Liga season.

In March 2015, Amini announced, that he would leave the club when his contract expired in June, after playing there for three years.

==== Randers FC ====
Amini signed a three-year deal with Danish Superliga club Randers FC in June 2015. He scored the opening goal in the club's 3–0 UEFA Europa League qualifying second leg win over Sant Julià.

==== AGF ====
In June 2016, Amini moved to Superliga side AGF on a four-year deal. Amini enjoyed a good debut for AGF, with a goal and an assist in a 2–1 win away at SønderjyskE in the Superliga on 17 July 2016.

==== Cyprus ====
In June 2021, Amini joined Cypriot First Division side Apollon Limassol on a two-year deal. In September 2021, Amini was loaned out to fellow First Division club PAEEK. In December 2021, he mutually terminated his contract with Apollon Limassol and left both Cypriot clubs.

==== Sydney FC ====
On 24 December 2021, Amini signed a six-month deal with A-League Men club Sydney FC as an injury replacement for Luke Brattan.

==== Perth Glory ====
On 10 June 2022, Amini signed a three-year deal with A-League Men club Perth Glory. Amini was announced just hours after the club released a statement advising members and fans that former Glory skipper, Brandon O'Neill had his request granted for an early release from his deal.

Amini was named Perth Glory team captain on 6 October 2022 ahead of the 2022–23 A-League Men season.

Having not made an appearance in the 2024-25 season due to a knee injury, Amini's contract with Perth was terminated on 28 December 2024, ahead of the January transfer window. Two days following Amini's contract termination Players Football Australia (PFA) announced they would initiate legal proceedings against Perth Glory for Amini's alleged illegal contract termination. Amini and Perth Glory settled the dispute in June 2025.

==== Nakhon Si United F.C. ====
In January 2026, Amini joined Thai League 2 side Nakhon Si United.

== International career ==
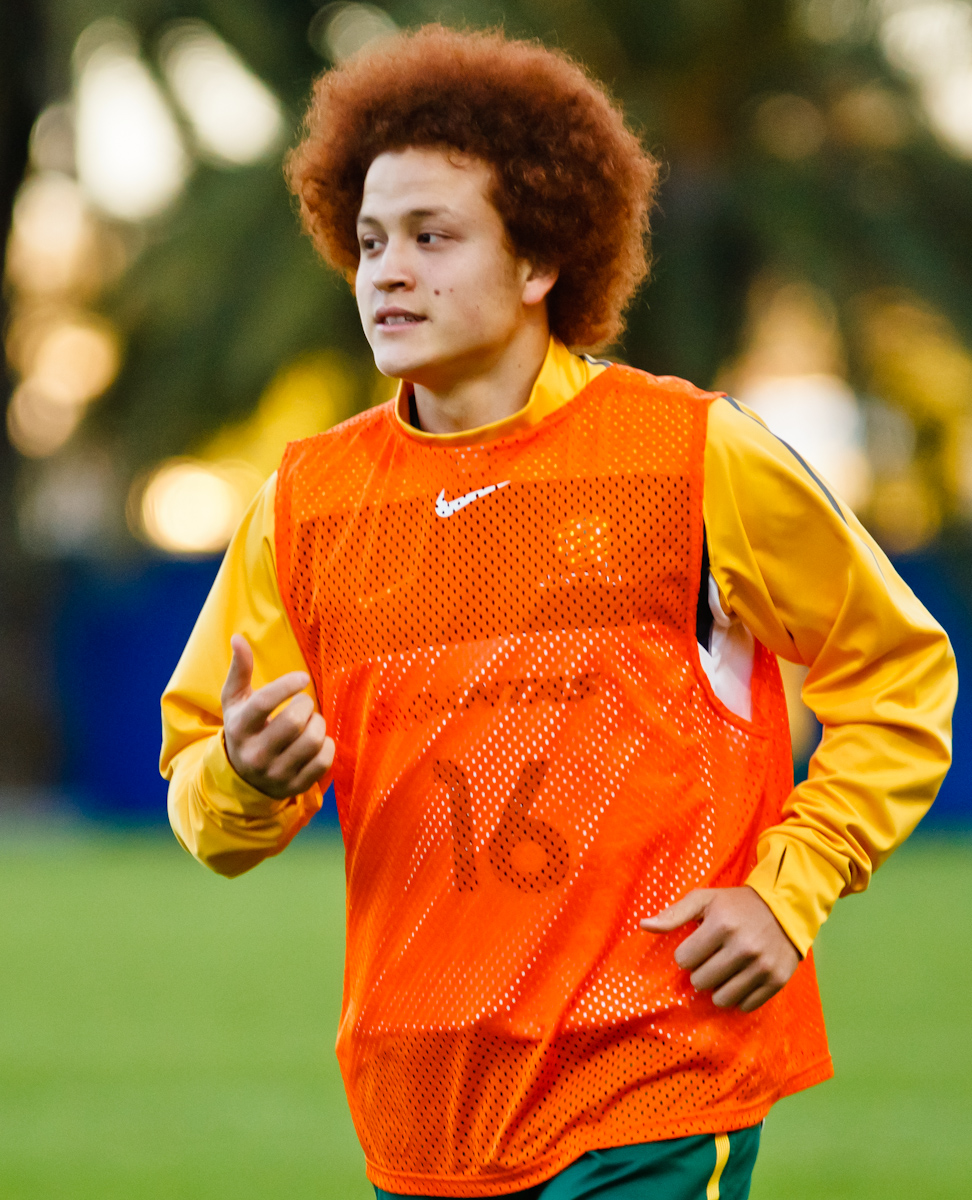
Amini training with the Australia national under-23 association football team in 2011.

=== Youth ===
Amini was first selected for Australia under-17 to play Turkey in a two-match series in April 2009 in Turkey. He made his Joeys debut in the first match of the series, a 1–0 loss, starting the match as a defender, but moving into midfield in the second half before being substituted late in the game. He also played a full match in the second leg, a 2–1 defeat.

Amini was selected to play for Australia U-20 in a four-match tour of South America against the Argentina U-20 and Paraguay U-20 teams from 3–19 April. He was then selected for the Australia U-20 again for the 2010 AFF U-19 Youth Championship. Amini scored his first goal for the Australia U-20 in the 2010 AFF U-19 Youth Championship in a 4–1 win over Vietnam U-20.

=== Senior ===
On 23 March 2011, after impressing on trial at Borussia Dortmund, Amini was called up to the Australian national side training camp by Head Coach Holger Osieck which was being held in Germany.

Amini was named among the 43 players squad to represent Afghanistan for 2014 AFC Challenge Cup preparations camp in Qatar, but he refused the call saying "I only want to play for Australia if I get the chance".

Amini was called-up to Australia's senior squad ahead of the World Cup qualifiers in March 2017. He debuted on 28 March 2017 against the United Arab Emirates at Allianz Stadium in Sydney, when subbed on in the 87th minute.

20 November 2018, Amini made his first starting appearance for Australia at Stadium Australia, Sydney in a friendly match against Lebanon in front of a crowd of 33,268 people. Amini played 74 minutes before being replaced by debutant James Jeggo with Australia three goals in the lead at the time. Australia went on to win the match 3–0.

== Career statistics ==
=== Club ===
As of 9 December 2023

Club	Season	League			National Cup		Continental		Other		Total	
Club	Season	Division	Apps	Goals	Apps	Goals	Apps	Goals	Apps	Goals	Apps	Goals
Central Coast Mariners	2010–11	A-League	23	1	0	0	0	0	–		23	1
Central Coast Mariners	2011–12	A-League	18	2	0	0	4 (Note: Appearances in AFC Champions League)	1	–		22	3
Central Coast Mariners	Total		41	3	0	0	4	1	–		45	4
Borussia Dortmund II	2012–13	3. Liga	14	0	–		–		–		14	0
Borussia Dortmund II	2013–14	3. Liga	15	1	–		–		–		15	1
Borussia Dortmund II	2014–15	3. Liga	28	2	–		–		–		28	2
Borussia Dortmund II	Total		57	3	–		–		–		57	3
Randers FC	2015–16	Danish Superliga	29	0	3	0	4 (Note: Appearances in UEFA Europa League)	1	–		36	1
AGF	2016–17	Danish Superliga	32	5	2	0	–		4 (Note: Appearances in Danish Superliga relegation play-offs)	0	38	5
AGF	2017–18	Danish Superliga	31	1	1	0	–		1 (Note: Appearance in Danish Superliga Europa League play-off)	0	33	1
AGF	2018–19	Danish Superliga	31	2	2	2	–		–		33	4
AGF	2019–20	Danish Superliga	16	2	0	0	–		–		16	2
AGF	2020–21	Danish Superliga	0	0	0	0	–		–		16	2
AGF	Total		110	10	5	2	–		5	0	120	12
Apollon Limassol	2021–22	Cypriot First Division	0	0	0	0	0	0	–		0	0
PAEEK (loan)	2021–22	Cypriot First Division	0	0	0	0	–		–		0	0
Sydney FC	2021–22	A-League Men	17	1	0	0	7	0	–		24	1
Perth Glory	2022–23	A-League Men	19	0	0	0	–		–		19	0
Perth Glory	2023–24	A-League Men	17	2	0	0	–		–		17	2
Perth Glory	2024–25	A-League Men	0	0	0	0	–		–		0	0
Perth Glory	Total		36	2	0	0	0	0	0	0	36	2
Nakhon Si United	2025–26	Thai League 2	1	0	0	0	—		0	0	1	0
Career total			291	19	8	2	15	2	5	0	319	23

=== International ===
Statistics accurate as of match played 15 October 2019.

Australia
Year	Apps	Goals
2017	2	0
2018	3	0
2019	3	0
Total	8	0

== Honours ==
Central Coast Mariners

- A-League Premiership: 2011–12

Australia U-20

- AFC U-20 Asian Cup: runner-up 2010
- AFF U-19 Youth Championship: 2010

== See also ==
- List of Central Coast Mariners FC players
- List of foreign Danish Superliga players
