= Dario Mijatović =

Croatian musician

Personal information
- Date of birth: 13 August 1984 (age 42)
- Place of birth: SFR Yugoslavia
- Height: 1.88 m (6 ft 2 in)
- Position: Defender

Youth career
- Pula 1856

Senior career*
Years	Team	Apps	(Gls)
2004–2006	Pula 1856	37	(0)
2006–2008	Vejle BK	49	(4)
2008	Croatia Sesvete	5	(0)
2009	Istra 1961		
2011	Borussia Neunkirchen		

International career^{‡}
2001	Croatia U-18	5	(0)
2002	Croatia U-19	9	(0)
2003	Croatia U-20	7	(0)
- * Club domestic league appearances and goals as of 14 June 2008 ‡ National team caps and goals as of 14 June 2008

Dario Mijatović (born 13 August 1984) is a Croatian retired football player.

== Career ==
He played abroad for Vejle Boldklub in the Danish Superliga. On 16 January 2006 he signed a 3 1/2-year contract with the Danish club. He scored 5 goals in 54 matches for the club, who released him in July 2008.

He joined Croatia Sesvete in September 2008.
