= Stephen Lowe (footballer) =

English footballer (born 1963)

Personal information
- Date of birth: March 11, 1963 (age 63)
- Place of birth: England
- Position: Goalkeeper

Youth career
- Aston Villa

Senior career*
Years	Team	Apps	(Gls)
- BK Herning Fremad
1989–1997	Viborg FF		

Managerial career
- 2007: Viborg FF
- * Club domestic league appearances and goals

Stephen Lowe (born 11 March 1963) is an English former football player and coach who played as a goalkeeper.

== Early life ==
Lowe represented England internationally at youth level.

== Playing career ==
Lowe played for Danish side Viborg FF, where he was described as a "club icon".

== Managerial career ==
Lowe worked as manager of Danish side Viborg FF.

== Personal life ==
Lowe is the son of a soldier father and a bookkeeper mother.
