= Gocha Kokoshvili =

Georgian footballer

Gocha Kokoshvili გოჩა ქოქოშვილი
Personal information
- Date of birth: March 25, 1969 (age 57)
- Place of birth: Georgia
- Height: 1.84 m (6 ft 0 in)
- Position: Defender

Senior career*
Years	Team	Apps	(Gls)
1990−1992	Merani (Tbilisi)	32	(1)
	Dinamo (Tbilisi)	19	(0)
1993	Spartak (Vladikavkaz)		
1994−1995	Asmaral	36	(0)
1995	Torpedo-2 (Moscow)	8	(0)
1996	Næstved	13	(0)
1996−1997	Olhanense	18	(5)
1997−1998	Belenenses	8	(0)
1998−1999	Næstved	8	(0)
1999−2000	Hapoel Tzafririm Holon		
2000−2002	Maccabi Kiryat Gat		
2002−2004	Hapoel Tzafririm Holon		
- * Club domestic league appearances and goals

Gocha Kokoshvili (Georgian: გოჩა ქოქოშვილი) is a Georgian former footballer who played as a defender

== Career ==
In 1995, Kokoshvili signed for Russian fourth division side Torpedo-2 (Moscow) from Asmaral in the Russian second division.

In 1996, he signed for Portuguese third division club Olhanense from Næstved in the Danish top flight.

In 1997, he signed for Portuguese top flight team Belenenses before joining Hapoel Tzafririm Holon in Israel.
