= Mehdi Guerrouad =

French footballer (born 1981)

Personal information
- Full name: Mehdi Radouane Guerrouad
- Date of birth: 29 September 1981 (age 45)
- Place of birth: France
- Positions: Defender; midfielder

Senior career*
Years	Team	Apps	(Gls)
-2002	Lille OSC	1	(0)
2002-2003	R.A.A. Louviéroise	8	(0)
2003/04-2005	Viborg FF	4	(0)
	Étoile Fréjus Saint-Raphaël	0	(0)
	Feignies Aulnoye FC	0	(0)
	R.F.C. Tournai	0	(0)
- * Club domestic league appearances and goals

Mehdi Radouane Guerrouad (born 29 September 1981 in France) is a French retired footballer.

== Career ==
After failing to make an appearance for French Ligue 1 side Lille OSC, Guerrouad signed for R.A.A. Louviéroise in the Belgian second division, where he had difficulty adapting due to the long season with Lille OSC.

For the second half of 2003/04, he signed for Danish top-flight club Viborg FF, where he only made 4 appearances over 2 seasons due to injury, before playing for Étoile Fréjus Saint-Raphaël, Feignies Aulnoye, as well as R.F.C. Tournai in the French and Belgian lower leagues.

While playing for R.A.A. Louviéroise, Guerrouad was called up to the Algeria national under-23 team. Despite aiming to represent Algeria internationally, he never made an appearance for them.
