= Mauricio Ortiz =

Argentine footballer

Personal information
- Date of birth: 24 June 1986 (age 39)
- Place of birth: Argentina
- Position(s): Midfielder, Forward

Senior career*
Years	Team	Apps	(Gls)
	Quilmes Atlético Club	0	(0)
2003/2004	Aarhus Gymnastikforening→(loan)	2	(1)
-2009	Ølstykke FC		
2009/2010	Boldklubben af 1893		
2016	Club Villa Mitre	2	(0)
- * Club domestic league appearances and goals

Mauricio Ortiz (born 24 June 1986) is an Argentine retired footballer.

== Career ==
At the age of 17, Ortiz played for Aarhus Gymnastikforening in the Danish top flight, scoring 1 goal in 2 appearances. However, his contract was not renewed due to his agents requesting too much money. After that, Ortiz played for Danish lower league sides Ølstykke, until they went bankrupt, and IF Skjold Birkerød.

In 2016, he played for Club Villa Mitre in the Argentine fourth division.
