= Mustafa Gönden =

Turkish footballer

Personal information
- Full name: Mustafa Gönden
- Date of birth: 1 August 1975 (age 51)
- Place of birth: Turkey
- Height: 1.80 m (5 ft 11 in)
- Position: Midfielder

Senior career*
Years	Team	Apps	(Gls)
?–2002	Gençlerbirliği S.K.		
2002–2003	Bucheon SK	7	(0)
2004–2005	Akademisk Boldklub	1	(0)
- * Club domestic league appearances and goals

Mustafa Gonden (born 1 August 1975) is a Turkish former professional footballer who played as a midfielder.

== Club career ==
He played mainly for Turkish football clubs, as well as for Bucheon SK of the South Korean between July 2002 and July 2003, making a total of 7 appearances.

== After retirement ==
He is running Mustafa Gönden Professional Football Academy.

== Honours ==
Gençlerbirliği

- Turkish Cup: 2000–01

== Enternal links ==
- Mustafa Gönden – K League stats at kleague.com (in Korean and English)
