= Stefan Campagnolo =

French footballer (born 1969)

Stefan Campagnolo (born 13 March 1969) is a French former footballer, who was playing for Elite 3000 Fodbold.

== Career ==
His former clubs include Lyngby Boldklub, HIK, Fremad Amager and Frem.
