= Chrys =

Brazilian footballer (born 1986)

Personal information
- Full name: Chrystiano Gomes Ferraz
- Date of birth: 6 December 1986 (age 39)
- Place of birth: Rio de Janeiro, Brazil
- Height: 1.70 m (5 ft 7 in)
- Position: Forward

Youth career
- 1994–1996: CFZ
- 1996–2000: Flamengo
- 2000–2006: Fluminense

Senior career*
| Years | Team | Apps | (Gls) |
| 2006 | América-RJ | 18 | (13) |
| 2006–2008 | AaB | 11 | (1) |
| 2008 | Madureira | 15 | (10) |
| 2008–2010 | Ethnikos Piraeus | 10 | (1) |
| 2010–2011 | América (Teófilo Otoni) | 11 | (5) |
| 2011 | Tupi | 5 | (2) |
| 2011–2012 | Metropolitano | | |
| 2013 | Guarani de Palhoça | | |
- * Club domestic league appearances and goals

Chrystiano Gomes Ferraz (born 6 December 1986), nicknamed Chrys, is a Brazilian professional football player who plays as a midfielder or striker. He retired from professional football in 2013.

== Career ==
Ferraz previously played for Brazilian clubs Clube Atlético Metropolitano, Fluminense, Flamengo, América, and Madureira Esporte Clube. He played some matches for Brazil U-15, U-16 and U-17. He has also played abroad with Aalborg Boldspilklub in the Danish Superliga and for Greek club Ethnikos Piraeus.
