= Giovanni Rector =

South African soccer player (born 1982)

Personal information
- Full name: Giovanni Mario Rector
- Date of birth: 27 January 1982 (age 44)
- Place of birth: Cape Town, South Africa
- Height: 1.75 m (5 ft 9 in)
- Position: Forward

Senior career*
Years	Team	Apps	(Gls)
1999–2001	Fortune	?	(?)
2001–2004	Mouscron	10	(0)
2004–2006	Fortune	?	(?)
2006–2007	Brøndby	4	(0)
2007–2008	Ikapa Sporting	?	(?)

International career
	South Africa U20	?	(?)
- * Club domestic league appearances and goals as of 29 February 2020 (UTC)

Giovanni Mario Rector (born 27 January 1982) is a South African former professional soccer player who played as a forward.

== Career ==
=== South Africa and Europe ===
Rector started his career with South African club FC Fortune, before moving abroad to play for Excelsior Mouscron in Belgium. During three years at Mouscron, he played ten league games without scoring any goals. In August 2005, he trained with English club Bolton Wanderers under manager Sam Allardyce, but did not secure a contract. He moved back to South Africa to play for FC Fortune again.

In August 2006, he signed a three-year contract with Brøndby IF in the Danish Superliga. Brøndby faced a shortage of strikers at the start of the 2006–07 Superliga season, due to the long-term injuries to Morten "Duncan" Rasmussen and Peguero Jean Philippe. Initially signed as a striker, Rector showed himself more of an attacking midfielder, and saw little playing time in his first half year at Brøndby. He spent the second half of the season in the Brøndby reserve team. Rector played a total nine games and scored one goal for Brøndby, before his contract was terminated in June 2007.

=== Failed tryouts ===
Later that year Rector returned to South Africa to play at Ikapa Sporting. Due to persistent injuries, he only played sparsingly. Afterwards, he had tryouts at Icelandic club ÍBV on invitation by South African head coach Renaldo Rapheal Christians, although unsuccessfully. In 2009, he had tryouts at Vasco da Gama Cape Town, before retiring from professional football.

== Retirement ==
Rector has since worked as a youth coach for a local team in Cape Town, and still has contact to former Brøndby club-captain Per Nielsen.
