= Steffen Lauser =

German footballer

Personal information
- Date of birth: 4 March 1984 (age 42)
- Place of birth: Germany
- Height: 1.75 m (5 ft 9 in)
- Position: Midfielder

Youth career
- SV Böblingen
- 2000–2001: VfB Stuttgart
- 2001–2004: Hertha BSC Berlin

Senior career*
Years	Team	Apps	(Gls)
2004–2005	SV Babelsberg 03		
2005–2007	Hamburger SV II	68	(0)
2007–2009	AC Horsens	18	(1)
2009–2012	FSV Hollenbach		

International career
	Germany U18	1	(0)
	Germany U19	2	(0)
- * Club domestic league appearances and goals

Steffen Lauser (born 4 March 1984) is a German former professional footballer who played as a midfielder.

== Career ==
On 5 May 2008, Lauser made his debut for AC Horsens, scoring the deciding goal in a 3–2 win over champions F.C. Copenhagen. In summer 2009, he signed for FSV Hollenbach on a two-year contract.
