= 2024–25 F.C. Copenhagen season =

F.C. Copenhagen
2024–25 season
- Chairman: Henrik Møgelmose
- Head coach: Jacob Neestrup
- Stadium: Parken
- Danish Superliga: 1st
- Danish Cup: Winners
- UEFA Conference League: Round of 16
- Top goalscorer: League: Mohamed Elyounoussi; Jordan Larsson (8 each); All: Kevin Diks; Mohamed Elyounoussi; Jordan Larsson (11 each)
- Highest home attendance: 35,972 (25 May 2025 vs. Nordsjælland)
- Lowest home attendance: 16,513 (7 August 2024 vs. Baník Ostrava)
- Average home league attendance: 28,205 (25 May 2025)
- Biggest win: 5–1 (1 August 2024 vs. FCB Magpies)
- Biggest defeat: 0–3 (19 December 2024 vs. Rapid Wien)
Home colours	Away colours	Third colours

The 2024–25 F.C. Copenhagen season was the club's 33rd season in existence, all of which were competed in the top flight of Danish football. The squad captured its record-setting sixteenth domestic league title on the final day of the season, and completed the historic double by winning its tenth Danish Cup.

By virtue of winning the 2023–24 Danish Superliga European play-off match, Copenhagen competed in the UEFA Conference League, advancing to the round of 16. The season covered the period from 1 July 2024 to 30 June 2025.

== Players ==
=== First-team squad ===
As of 19 February 2025

No.	Player	Nationality	Position	Since	Date of birth	Signed from
Goalkeepers
1	Nathan Trott	(England) (Bermuda)	GK	2024	21 November 1998	(England) West Ham United
31	Rúnar Alex Rúnarsson	(Iceland)	GK	2024	18 February 1995	(England) Arsenal
41	Diant Ramaj	(Germany)	GK	2025	19 September 2001	(Germany) Borussia Dortmund
Defenders
2	Kevin Diks	(Indonesia) (Netherlands)	CB	2021	6 October 1996	(Italy) Fiorentina
4	Munashe Garananga	(Zimbabwe)	CB	2024	18 January 2001	(Belgium) Mechelen
5	Gabriel Pereira	(Brazil)	CB	2024	7 May 2000	(Portugal) Gil Vicente
6	Pantelis Hatzidiakos	(Greece) (Netherlands)	CB	2024	18 January 1997	(Italy) Cagliari
13	Rodrigo Huescas	(Mexico)	RB	2024	18 September 2003	(Mexico) Cruz Azul
15	Marcos López	(Peru)	LB	2024	20 November 1999	(Netherlands) Feyenoord
20	Nicolai Boilesen	(Denmark)	CB	2016	16 February 1992	(Netherlands) Ajax
22	Giorgi Gocholeishvili	(Georgia (country))	RB	2024	14 February 2001	(Ukraine) Shakhtar Donetsk
24	Birger Meling	(Norway)	LB	2023	17 December 1994	(France) Rennes
Midfielders
7	Viktor Claesson (captain)	(Sweden)	CM	2022	2 January 1992	(Russia) Krasnodar
8	Magnus Mattsson	(Denmark)	CM	2024	25 February 1999	(Netherlands) NEC Nijmegen
10	Mohamed Elyounoussi	(Norway)	LW	2023	4 August 1994	(England) Southampton
12	Lukas Lerager	(Denmark)	CM	2021	12 July 1993	(Italy) Genoa
16	Robert	(Brazil)	LW	2024	13 April 2005	(Brazil) Cruzeiro
17	Victor Froholdt	(Denmark)	CM	2024	25 February 2006	(Denmark) Homegrown
27	Thomas Delaney	(Denmark)	CM	2024	3 September 1991	(Spain) Sevilla
30	Elias Achouri	(Tunisia) (France)	LW	2023	10 February 1999	(Denmark) Viborg
33	Rasmus Falk	(Denmark)	CM	2016	15 January 1992	(Denmark) Odense
36	William Clem	(Denmark)	CDM	2022	20 June 2004	(Denmark) Homegrown
38	Oliver Højer	(Denmark)	CM	2023	24 January 2007	(Denmark) Homegrown
40	Roony Bardghji	(Sweden)	RW	2021	15 November 2005	(Denmark) Homegrown
48	Hunor Németh	(Hungary)	CM	2025	16 March 2007	(Denmark) Homegrown
Forwards
11	Jordan Larsson	(Sweden)	FW	2023	20 June 1997	(Germany) Schalke 04
14	Andreas Cornelius	(Denmark)	FW	2022	16 March 1993	(Turkey) Trabzonspor
19	Amin Chiakha	(Algeria) (Denmark)	FW	2023	12 March 2006	(Denmark) Homegrown

=== Youth players in use ===
Note: Flags indicate national team as defined under FIFA eligibility rules; some limited exceptions apply. Players may hold more than one non-FIFA nationality.

No.	Pos.	Nation	Player
61	GK	DEN	Oscar Gadeberg Buur

=== Out on loan ===
Note: Flags indicate national team as defined under FIFA eligibility rules; some limited exceptions apply. Players may hold more than one non-FIFA nationality.

No.	Pos.	Nation	Player
—	GK	DEN	Theo Sander (at (Denmark) Hvidovre until 30 June 2025)
—	DF	SVK	Denis Vavro (at (Germany) Wolfsburg until 30 June 2025)
—	MF	NGR	Paul Mukairu (at (Turkey) Boluspor until 30 June 2025)

No.	Pos.	Nation	Player
—	FW	FRA	Mamoudou Karamoko (at (Hungary) Újpest until 30 June 2025)
—	FW	RUS	German Onugkha (at (Denmark) Vejle until 30 June 2025)

== Transfers ==
=== In ===
Date	Pos.	Nat.	Name	Club	Fee	Ref.
1 July 2024	GK	(England) (Bermuda)	Nathan Trott	(England) West Ham United	€1.50m	
7 July 2024	DF	(Zimbabwe)	Munashe Garananga	(Belgium) Mechelen	€5.00m	
10 July 2024	DF	(Mexico)	Rodrigo Huescas	(Mexico) Cruz Azul	€1.85m	
20 July 2024	MF	(Denmark)	Thomas Delaney	(Spain) Sevilla	Free Transfer	
7 August 2024	DF	(Brazil)	Gabriel Pereira	(Portugal) Gil Vicente	€5.00m	
2 September 2024	FW	(Russia) (Nigeria)	German Onugkha	(Denmark) Vejle	€1.50m	
20 January 2025	MF	(Brazil)	Robert	(Brazil) Cruzeiro	€2.00m	

=== Loans in ===
Date	Pos.	Nat.	Name	Club	Duration	Ref.
29 July 2024	DF	(Georgia (country))	Giorgi Gocholeishvili	(Ukraine) Shakhtar Donetsk	30 June 2025	
6 August 2024	MF	(Brazil)	Robert	(Brazil) Cruzeiro	20 January 2025	
22 August 2024	DF	(Peru)	Marcos López	(Netherlands) Feyenoord	30 June 2025	
2 September 2024	DF	(Greece)	Pantelis Hatzidiakos	(Italy) Cagliari	30 June 2025	
3 February 2025	GK	(Germany)	Diant Ramaj	(Germany) Borussia Dortmund	30 June 2025	

=== Out ===
Date	Pos.	Nat.	Name	Club	Fee	Ref.
1 July 2024	GK	(Denmark)	Andreas Dithmer	(Netherlands) Jong Utrecht	€135k	
1 July 2024	GK	(Poland)	Kamil Grabara	(Germany) Wolfsburg	€13.50m	
1 July 2024	DF	(Denmark)	Peter Ankersen	(Denmark) Nordsjælland	Free Transfer	
1 July 2024	MF	(Iceland)	Ísak Bergmann Jóhannesson	(Germany) Fortuna Düsseldorf	€2.00m	
1 July 2024	MF	(Denmark)	Daniel Haarbo	(Denmark) Fredericia	Free Transfer	
7 July 2024	DF	(Georgia (country))	Davit Khocholava	Retired	N/A	
10 July 2024	MF	(Denmark)	Oscar Højlund	(Germany) Eintracht Frankfurt	€1.35m	
16 July 2024	FW	(Denmark)	Emil Højlund	(Germany) Schalke 04	€300k	
25 July 2024	DF	(Denmark)	Elias Jelert	(Turkey) Galatasaray	€9.00m	
6 August 2024	FW	(Senegal)	Khouma Babacar	(Turkey) Boluspor	Free Transfer	
8 August 2024	DF	(Denmark)	Christian Sørensen	(Denmark) Midtjylland	€500k	
9 August 2024	MF	(Portugal)	Diogo Gonçalves	(United States) Real Salt Lake	€3.00m	
20 August 2024	MF	(Denmark)	Thomas Jørgensen	(Denmark) Viborg	€600k	
30 August 2024	FW	(Iceland)	Orri Óskarsson	(Spain) Real Sociedad	€20.00m	
30 January 2025	MF	(Denmark)	Noah Sahsah	(Norway) Rosenborg	€170k	

=== Loans out ===
Date	Pos.	Nat.	Name	Club	Duration	Ref.
9 July 2024	FW	(France)	Mamoudou Karamoko	(Hungary) Újpest	30 June 2025	
6 August 2024	MF	(Denmark)	Noah Sahsah	(Norway) Rosenborg	31 December 2024	
30 August 2024	DF	(Slovakia)	Denis Vavro	(Germany) Wolfsburg	30 June 2025	
5 September 2024	MF	(Nigeria)	Paul Mukairu	(Turkey) Boluspor	30 June 2025	
26 January 2025	FW	(Russia) (Nigeria)	German Onugkha	(Denmark) Vejle	30 June 2025	
3 February 2025	GK	(Denmark)	Theo Sander	(Denmark) Hvidovre	30 June 2025	

=== New contracts ===
Date	Pos.	Nat.	Name	Contract until	Ref.
19 July 2024	FW	(Iceland)	Orri Óskarsson	30 June 2028	
23 July 2024	MF	(Denmark)	Victor Froholdt	30 June 2028	
24 August 2024	MF	(Tunisia) (France)	Elias Achouri	30 June 2028	
20 September 2024	FW	(Algeria) (Denmark)	Amin Chiakha	30 June 2029	
26 October 2024	Mgr	(Denmark)	Jacob Neestrup	30 June 2029	
24 January 2025	MF	(Denmark)	Oliver Højer	30 June 2029	

== Non-competitive ==
=== Pre-season ===
Copenhagen began pre-season training on 22 June 2024. The team spent 4–13 July at the Hotel Kaiserlodge in Scheffau am Wilden Kaiser, Austria and played two friendlies during their time in Austria.

27 June 2024	Copenhagen	1–0	Silkeborg	Frederiksberg
13:00 CEST	Claesson (yellow card) 55'; Chiakha 62'	Report		Stadium: Nummer 10; Referee: Simon Duerlund Rasmussen

2 July 2024	Copenhagen	0–1	Hillerød	Frederiksberg
12:00 CEST		Report	Pingel 13'	Stadium: Nummer 10; Referee: Svend Funder

8 July 2024	WSG Tirol (Austria)	0–5	Copenhagen	Wattens, Austria
18:30 CEST		Report	Larsson 41'; Claesson 45'; Chiakha 52'; Óskarsson 77'; Jørgensen 80'	Stadium: Gernot Langes Stadion; Attendance: 350; Referee: Stjepan Bosnjak (Austria)

12 July 2024	Viktoria Plzeň (Czech Republic)	3–3	Copenhagen	Kufstein, Austria
16:00 CEST	Panoš 13'; Kabongo 16'; Vydra 69'	Report	Mattsson 4'; Óskarsson 66'; Claesson 90+1'	Stadium: Grenzlandstadion Kufstein; Attendance: 200; Referee: Florian Jäger (Austria)

16 July 2024	Copenhagen	3–2	Sønderjyske	Frederiksberg
14:00 CEST	Óskarsson 16'; Meling 88'; Chiakha 90'	Report	Klysner 44'; Lyng 53'	Stadium: Nummer 10; Referee: Oliver Simbold

=== In-season Autumn ===
5 September 2024	Copenhagen	1–2	(Sweden) Landskrona BoIS	Frederiksberg
13:00 CEST	Robert 21'	Report	Bruzelius 10'; Nilsson 46'	Stadium: Nummer 10; Attendance: 200; Referee: Jonas Hansen

17 September 2024	Copenhagen	0–0	Fremad Amager	Frederiksberg
11:00 CEST		Report		Stadium: Nummer 10; Attendance: 100; Referee: Jonas Hansen

19 October 2024	Copenhagen	2–0	HIK	Frederiksberg
11:00 CEST	Onugkha 41'; Huescas 57'	Report		Stadium: Nummer 10; Attendance: 100; Referee: Svend Funder

19 November 2024	Copenhagen	0–1	OB	Frederiksberg
13:00 CET		Report	Bonde 36'	Stadium: Nummer 10; Referee: Philip Warburg

=== Mid-season ===
18 January 2025	Copenhagen	3–0	Lyngby	Frederiksberg
12:00 CET	Mattsson 22'; Garananga 67'; Larsson 79'	Report		Stadium: Nummer 10; Attendance: 500; Referee: Simon Duerlund Rasmussen

24 January 2025	Copenhagen	1–0	Viborg	Frederiksberg
13:00 CET	Delaney 56'	Report		Stadium: Nummer 10; Referee: Alexander Mygind Dreyer

24 January 2025	Copenhagen	1–0	Viborg	Frederiksberg
14:30 CET	Bidstrup 57'	Report		Stadium: Nummer 10; Referee: Alexander Mygind Dreyer

1 February 2025	Silkeborg	0–3	Copenhagen	Murcia, Spain
16:00 CET		Report	Larsson 43', 58'; Claesson 77'	Stadium: Pinatar Arena; Attendance: 50; Referee: Moreno Munoz (Spain)

2 February 2025	Elche (Spain)	1–0	Copenhagen	Elche, Spain
12:30 CET	Rashani 30'	Report		Stadium: Estadio Martínez Valero; Referee: Saúl Ais Reig (Spain)

8 February 2025	AGF	4–3	Copenhagen	Vejlby
14:00 CET	Anderson 54' (pen.) 58'; Mortensen 86'; Poulsen 90+2'	Report	Chiakha 13'; Robert 22'; Mattsson 29' (pen.)	Stadium: Ceres Park Vejlby; Attendance: 4,803; Referee: Aydin Uslu

=== In-season Spring ===
24 February 2025	Copenhagen	1–2	OB	Frederiksberg
12:30 CET	Chiakha 18'	Report	Bojang 32'; Don Deedson 42'	Stadium: Nummer 10; Attendance: 50; Referee: Benjamin Helm Svedborg

20 March 2025	Copenhagen	1–3	Lyngby	Frederiksberg
12:30 CET	Risnæs 4'	Report	Opoku 22', 34', 43'	Stadium: Nummer 10; Referee: Benjamin Emil Friis

25 March 2025	Copenhagen	0–0	Hvidovre	Frederiksberg
11:30 CET		Report		Stadium: Nummer 10; Attendance: 75; Referee: Frida Mia Klarlund

== Competitions ==
=== Overall record ===
Competition	First match	Last match	Starting round	Final position	Record							
Competition	First match	Last match	Starting round	Final position	Pld	W	D	L	GF	GA	GD	Win %
Superliga	22 July 2024	25 May 2025	Matchday 1	Winners	32	18	9	5	60	33	+27	56.25
Danish Cup	26 September 2024	29 May 2025	Third Round	Winners	7	7	0	0	13	2	+11	100.00
Conference League	25 July 2024	13 March 2025	2nd Qualifying Round	Round of 16	16	7	3	6	25	18	+7	43.75
Total					55	32	12	11	98	53	+45	58.18

Last updated: 29 May 2025
Source: Soccerway

Source: Competitive matches

=== Superliga ===
==== League table ====
Pos	Team	Pld	W	D	L	GF	GA	GD	Pts	Qualification
1	Midtjylland	22	14	3	5	42	27	+15	45	Qualification for the Championship round
2	Copenhagen	22	11	8	3	38	24	+14	41	Qualification for the Championship round
3	AGF	22	9	9	4	42	23	+19	36	Qualification for the Championship round
4	Randers	22	9	8	5	39	28	+11	35	Qualification for the Championship round
5	Nordsjælland	22	10	5	7	39	36	+3	35	Qualification for the Championship round

Source: Danish Football Association (in Danish), Soccerway
Rules for classification: 1) Points; 2) Goal difference; 3) Goals scored; 4) Away goals scored; 5) Play-off (played on neutral ground if determining teams for different rounds); 6) Draw.

==== Results summary ====
Overall								Home						Away					
Pld	W	D	L	GF	GA	GD	Pts	W	D	L	GF	GA	GD	W	D	L	GF	GA	GD
32	18	9	5	60	33	+27	63	10	5	1	31	15	+16	8	4	4	29	18	+11

Last updated: 25 May 2025.
Source: FBref

==== Results by round – regular season ====
Matchday	1	2	3	4	5	6	7	8	9	10	11	12	13	14	15	16	17	18	19	20	21	22
Ground	A	H	H	A	H	A	H	A	H	A	A	H	A	H	A	H	H	A	H	A	H	A
Result	W	W	D	W	D	L	W	L	W	W	D	W	D	D	D	W	W	W	W	D	D	L
Position	2	2	4	1	3	5	4	5	3	2	2	1	2	3	2	1	1	1	1	1	2	2

Source: http://www.superliga.dk/
A = Away; H = Home; W = Win; D = Draw; L = Loss

==== Championship round ====
Pos	Team	Pld	W	D	L	GF	GA	GD	Pts	
1	Copenhagen (C)	32	18	9	5	60	33	+27	63	Qualification for the UEFA Champions League second qualifying round
2	Midtjylland	32	19	5	8	64	42	+22	62	Qualification for the UEFA Europa League second qualifying round
3	Brøndby	32	13	12	7	58	46	+12	51	Qualification for the UEFA Conference League second qualifying round
4	Randers	32	13	9	10	57	50	+7	48	Qualification for the European play-off match
5	Nordsjælland	32	13	7	12	53	56	−3	46	

Source: Danish Football Association (in Danish), Soccerway
Rules for classification: 1) Points; 2) Goal difference; 3) Goals scored; 4) Away goals scored; 5) Play-off (played on neutral ground if determining teams for different rounds); 6) Draw.
(C) Champions

==== Results by round - Championship round ====
Matchday	1	2	3	4	5	6	7	8	9	10
Ground	H	A	H	A	H	A	A	H	A	H
Result	W	W	L	L	W	W	W	D	W	W
Position	2	1	1	2	1	1	1	1	1	1

Updated to match(es) played on 25 May 2025. Source: http://www.superliga.dk/
A = Away; H = Home; W = Win; D = Draw; L = Loss

==== Regular season ====
22 July 2024 1	Lyngby	0–2	Copenhagen	Lyngby
12:00 CEST	Winther (yellow card) 83'; Kumado (yellow card) 89'	Report	Óskarsson 7' (Huescas); Elyounoussi 30' (Larsson); Larsson (yellow card) 57'; Froholdt (yellow card) 90+2'	Stadium: Lyngby Stadion; Attendance: 9,614; Referee: Jakob A. Sundberg

28 July 2024 2	Copenhagen	3–2	AGF	Copenhagen
15:00 CEST	Gonçalves 27' (pen.); Óskarsson 73' (Diks); Delaney 78' (Elyounoussi)	Report	Bech 13' (Anderson); Madsen 32'; Beijmo (yellow card) 75'	Stadium: Parken; Attendance: 28,283; Referee: Lasse Graagaard

4 August 2024 3	Copenhagen	1–1	Randers	Copenhagen
16:00 CEST	Diks (yellow card) 27'; Elyounoussi 64' (Delaney)	Report	Lauenborg 10' (Danho); Danho (red card) 27'; Dammers (yellow card) 30'	Stadium: Parken; Attendance: 25,819; Referee: Michael Tykgaard

11 August 2024 4	Sønderjyske	0–2	Copenhagen	Haderslev
18:00 CEST		Report	Óskarsson 17' (Falk); Elyounoussi 86'	Stadium: Sydbank Park; Attendance: 7,912; Referee: Jakob Kehlet

18 August 2024 5	Copenhagen	1–1	Viborg	Copenhagen
16:00 CEST	Gocholeishvili (yellow card) 80'; Óskarsson 83' (Elyounoussi); Achouri 89'	Report	Renato Júnior (yellow card) 43'; Vester	Stadium: Parken; Attendance: 26,035; Referee: Sandi Putros

25 August 2024 6	Nordsjælland	3–2	Copenhagen	Farum
16:00 CEST	Egeli 3' (Ankersen); Ingvartsen 5' (Egeli) (yellow card) 83'; Nygren 30' (Harder)	Report	Óskarsson 54' (Elyounoussi); Vavro (yellow card) 69'; Claesson	Stadium: Right to Dream Park; Attendance: 8,612; Referee: Jacob Karlsen

1 September 2024 7	Copenhagen	3–1	Brøndby	Copenhagen
14:00 CEST	Gabriel Pereira 4' (Mattsson) (yellow card) 90+2'; Diks 17' (pen.); Claesson (yellow card) 20'; López (red card) 45'; Elyounoussi 75' (Claesson); Chiakha (yellow card) 90+4'	Report	Kvistgaarden 61' (Sebulonsen)	Stadium: Parken; Attendance: 34,236; Referee: Morten Krogh

14 September 2024 8	Midtjylland	2–1	Copenhagen	Herning
18:00 CEST	O. Sørensen 69' (Diao); Martínez (yellow card) 64'; Diao 79' (yellow card) 79'; Djú (yellow card) 85'<	Report	Diks 31' (pen.); Hatzidiakos (yellow card) 68'; Lerager (yellow card) 72'; Gabriel Pereira (yellow card) 90+1'; Cornelius (yellow card) 82'; Delaney (yellow card) 90+3'	Stadium: MCH Arena; Attendance: 11,599; Referee: Jakob A. Sundberg

23 September 2024 9	Copenhagen	2–0	AaB	Copenhagen
19:00 CEST	Gocholeishvili (yellow card) 35'; Delaney (yellow card) 49'; Mattsson 63' (Achouri); Elyounoussi 72' (Diks)	Report	Pudel (yellow card) 74'; Diakhité (yellow card) 89'	Stadium: Parken; Attendance: 24,699; Referee: Mikkel Redder

29 September 2024 10	Vejle	1–2	Copenhagen	Vejle
18:00 CEST	Kirkegaard 46'; Provstgaard (yellow card) 54'; Hetemi (yellow card) 54'; Yeboah (yellow card) 60'; Elvius (yellow card) 67'; Murata (yellow card) 79'	Report	Achouri (yellow card) 60'; Diks 6' (pen.); Cornelius 86' (López); Froholdt (yellow card) 88'	Stadium: Vejle Stadium; Attendance: 9,063; Referee: Jonas Hansen

6 October 2024 11	Silkeborg	2–2	Copenhagen	Silkeborg
20:00 CEST	Bakiz 6' (yellow card) 70'; Andersen 28' (Adamsen); Freundlich (yellow card) 61'; Sonne (yellow card) 89'	Report	Mattsson (yellow card) 37'; Delaney (yellow card) 45+3'; Cornelius (yellow card) 59'; Claesson 71' (Hatzidiakos); Gabriel Pereira 85' (Elyounoussi); Diks (yellow card) 89'	Stadium: JYSK Park; Attendance: 5,468; Referee: Jakob Kehlet

18 October 2024 12	Copenhagen	3–1	Vejle	Copenhagen
19:00 CEST	Elyounoussi; Claesson 90+2'	Report	Kirkegaard (yellow card) 67' (goal) 77' (Jacobsen); Ofori (yellow card) 90'	Stadium: Parken; Attendance: 27,799; Referee: Mads-Kristoffer Kristoffersen

27 October 2024 13	Brøndby	0–0	Copenhagen	Brøndbyvester
12:00 CET	Vanlerberghe (yellow card) 87'; Radošević (yellow card) 90+2'; Kvistgaarden (yellow card) 90+4'	Report	Delaney (yellow card) 25'	Stadium: Brøndby Stadium; Attendance: 26,075; Referee: Jakob A. Sundberg

4 November 2024 14	Copenhagen	2–2	Silkeborg	Copenhagen
19:00 CET	Cornelius 2' (Gocholeishvili); Diks 90+1' (pen.); Hatzidiakos (yellow card) 90+10'	Report	Adamsen 45+3' (pen.); Gammelby (yellow card) 90'; Freundlich (yellow card) 90+6'; Simmelhack 90+9'	Stadium: Parken; Attendance: 20,785; Referee: Jakob Kehlet

10 November 2024 15	AGF	1–1	Copenhagen	Aarhus
19:00 CET	Dalsgaard 47' (Links); Madsen (yellow card) 62'	Report	Hatzidiakos 2' (Elyounoussi); Delaney (yellow card) 80'	Stadium: Ceres Park; Attendance: 15,894; Referee: Jens Maae

24 November 2024 16	Copenhagen	2–1	Lyngby	Copenhagen
18:00 CET	Robert 19' (Diks); Froholdt (yellow card) 68' (goal) 81' (Cornelius); Hatzidiakos (yellow card) 90+2'; Cornelius (yellow card) 90+6'	Report	Sandgrav (yellow card) 33'; Magnússon (yellow card) 38'; Gytkjær (yellow card) 81'; Opoku 88' (Gytkjær); Lissens (yellow card) 90+6'	Stadium: Parken; Attendance: 22,783; Referee: Jonas Hansen

2 December 2024 17	Copenhagen	3–1	Nordsjælland	Copenhagen
19:00 CET	Robert 41' (Claesson); Delaney 81' (Elyounoussi); Elyounoussi 83' (Delaney); Mattsson (yellow card) 90'	Report	Ankersen 18' (Egeli); Ingvartsen (yellow card) 51'; Tverskov (yellow card) 55'	Stadium: Parken; Attendance: 22,996; Referee: Sandi Putros

17 February 2025 18	Randers	1–2	Copenhagen	Randers
19:00 CET	Nordli 46' (Danho); Olsen (yellow card) 73'	Report	Delaney (yellow card) 21' (goal) 23' (Claesson); Gabriel Pereira (yellow card) 24'; Larsson 29'; Huescas (yellow card) 34'; Hatzidiakos (yellow card) 49'	Stadium: Cepheus Park Randers; Attendance: 5,765; Referee: Mikkel Redder

23 February 2025 19	Copenhagen	1–0	Midtjylland	Copenhagen
18:00 CET	Mattsson 54' (pen.); López (yellow card) 90+3'; Huescas (yellow card) 90+3'; Ramaj (yellow card) 90+10'	Report	Sørensen (yellow card) 53'; Mbabu (yellow card) 90+3'; Bech (yellow card) 90+4'	Stadium: Parken; Attendance: 31,708; Referee: Jakob Karlsen

2 March 2025 20	AaB	0–0	Copenhagen	Aalborg
18:00 CET	Jiménez (yellow card) 89'	Report		Stadium: Aalborg Portland Park; Attendance: 9,146; Referee: Morten Krogh

9 March 2025 21	Copenhagen	1–1	Sønderjyske	Copenhagen
18:00 CET	Claesson 8' (López); López (yellow card) 50'; Huescas (yellow card) 61'	Report	Björklund 43' (Emini); Emini (yellow card) 45+2'; Agger (yellow card) 50'; Ingason (yellow card) 54'	Stadium: Parken; Attendance: 28,922; Referee: Jakob A. Sundberg

16 March 2025 22	Viborg	3–2	Copenhagen	Viborg
17:00 CET	Grønning (yellow card) 34'; Serginho 48' (Kuzmić); Radić; Ementa	Report	Gocholeishvili 26' (Hatzidiakos); Larsson 41' (Clem); Gabriel Pereira (yellow card) 90'	Stadium: Energi Viborg Arena; Attendance: 7,750; Referee: Jakob Kehlet

==== Championship round ====
31 March 2025 23	Copenhagen	1–0	Randers	Copenhagen
19:00 CEST	Mattsson 20' (Huescas); Achouri (yellow card) 31'; Clem (yellow card) 45+4'; Hatzidiakos (yellow card) 52'	Report	Lauenborg (yellow card) 6'; Mahmoud (yellow card) 89'	Stadium: Parken; Attendance: 22,979; Referee: Jonas Hansen

6 April 2025 24	Nordsjælland	0–1	Copenhagen	Farum
18:00 CEST	Yirenkyi (yellow card) 63'	Report	Chiakha	Stadium: Right to Dream Park; Attendance: 7,788; Referee: Mads-Kristoffer Kristoffersen

13 April 2025 25	Copenhagen	1–2	Brøndby	Copenhagen
14:00 CEST	Ramaj (yellow card) 19' (red card) 90+12'; Froholdt (yellow card) 24'; Achouri 57' (yellow card) 90+11'; Gabriel Pereira (yellow card) 90'; Elyounoussi (penalty missed) '90+7; Huescas (yellow card) 90+10'	Report	Kvistgaarden 18'; Rasmussen (yellow card) 39'; Pentz (yellow card) 40' (yellow-red card) 90+12'; Tahirović (yellow card) 54'; Wass 90+2' (pen.); Lauritsen (yellow card) 90+10'; Mikkelsen (red card) 90+12'	Stadium: Parken; Attendance: 35,370; Referee: Sandi Putros

17 April 2025 26	Midtjylland	4–2	Copenhagen	Herning
18:00 CEST	Buksa 29' 90+1' (pen.); Mbabu (yellow card) 30'; Gogorza 39' (Mbabu); Diao 86' (Byskov)	Report	Elyounoussi 56' (Achouri); Cornelius (yellow card) 60'; Froholdt 78' (Claesson); Hatziadiakos (yellow card) 90+1'	Stadium: MCH Arena; Attendance: 11,832; Referee: Michael Tykgaard

21 April 2025 27	Copenhagen	3–1	AGF	Copenhagen
18:00 CEST	Claesson 13' (Larsson); Achouri (yellow card) 37'; Larsson 62' (Achouri); Chiakha 81' (Froholdt); Huescas (yellow card) 85'	Report	Anderson (yellow card) 21'; Kahl (yellow card) 58'; Poulsen (yellow card) 73'; Bech 88' (Badji)	Stadium: Parken; Attendance: 28,476; Referee: Jakob A. Sundberg

27 April 2025 28	AGF	1–3	Copenhagen	Aarhus
16:00 CEST	Beijmo 65'; Links (yellow card) 77'	Report	Lerager 43'; Delaney (yellow card) 60' (goal) 90+5'; Larsson 84' (Cornelius) (yellow card) 89'	Stadium: Ceres Park; Attendance: 8,142; Referee: Jacob Karlsen

4 May 2025 29	Brøndby	0–3	Copenhagen	Brøndbyvester
16:00 CEST	Divković (yellow card) 90+3'; Bischoff (yellow card) 90+4'	Report	Larsson 37' (Delaney) (yellow card) 90+4'; Gocholeishvili (yellow card) 45+1'; Froholdt 63' (Cornelius); Gabriel Pereira 81'; Hatzidiakos (yellow card) 86'; Lerager (yellow card) 90+5'	Stadium: Brøndby Stadium; Attendance: 26,885; Referee: Mads-Kristoffer Kristoffersen

11 May 2025 30	Copenhagen	1–1	Midtjylland	Copenhagen
20:00 CEST	Delaney (yellow card) 77' (goal) 83' (Elyounoussi)	Report	O. Sørensen 38' (Lee Han-beom); Gogorza (yellow card) 53'; Mbabu (yellow card) 75'; Bravo (yellow card) 80'; Osorio (yellow card) 85'; Paulinho (yellow card) 90+1'	Stadium: Parken; Attendance: 34,418; Referee: Mikkel Redder

18 May 2025 31	Randers	0–4	Copenhagen	Randers
18:00 CEST	Mahmoud (yellow card) 80'	Report	Larsson 11' (López) 44' (Cornelius); Huescas 63'; Cornelius 74' (Achouri); Lerager (yellow card) 78'; Chiakha (yellow card) 86'	Stadium: Cepheus Park; Attendance: 9,110; Referee: Jakob A. Sundberg

25 May 2025 32	Copenhagen	3–0	Nordsjælland	Copenhagen
17:00 CEST	Achouri 2' (Froholdt); Larsson 48' (Achouri) (yellow card) 49'; Diks 59' (pen.)	Report	Høgsberg (yellow card) 58'	Stadium: Parken; Attendance: 35,972; Referee: Michael Tykgaard

=== Danish Cup ===
==== Third round ====
26 September 2024 Third Round	HB Køge	0–2	Copenhagen	Herfølge
19:00 CEST	Khan (yellow card) 68'	Report	Lerager 81'; Hatzidiakos 90+3' (Mattsson)	Stadium: Herfølge Stadium; Attendance: 6,641; Referee: Jacob Karlsen

==== Fourth round ====
31 October 2024 Fourth Round	Sønderjyske	1–2	Copenhagen	Haderslev
20:00 CET	Vinderslev 17'; Björklund (yellow card) 85'	Report	Diks (yellow card) 45+1'; Soulas 67' (o.g.); Claesson 90+1'; Huescas (yellow card) 90+4'	Stadium: Sydbank Park; Attendance: 6,501; Referee: Morten Krogh

==== Quarter-finals ====
7 December 2024 Quarter-finals first leg	Kolding	1–3	Copenhagen	Kolding
14:00 CET	Musbaudeen (yellow card) 4'; Beck 79' (Sarr); Vestergaard (yellow card) 89'	Report	Delaney 8' (yellow card) 14'; Clem 38'; Diks (penalty missed) 75'; Chiakha 75'	Stadium: Autocentralen Park; Attendance: 6,000; Referee: Jakob Kehlet

15 December 2024 Quarter-finals second leg	Copenhagen	1–0 (4–1 agg.)	Kolding	Copenhagen
16:00 CET	Robert 51' (Cornelius); Cornelius (yellow card) 62'	Report	Beck (yellow card) 37'; Vestergaard (yellow card) 57'; Jørgensen (yellow card) 62'; Njai (yellow card) 70'; Tånnander (yellow card) 90+5'	Stadium: Parken; Attendance: 14,005; Referee: Michael Tykgaard

==== Semi-finals ====
1 May 2025 Semi-finals first leg	Viborg	0–1	Copenhagen	Viborg
19:30 CET	Lonwijk (yellow card) 88'	Report	Huescas (yellow card) 45'; Larsson 58' (Claesson); Lerager (yellow card) 67'	Stadium: Energi Viborg Arena; Attendance: 8,513; Referee: Sandi Putros

8 May 2025 Semi-finals second leg	Copenhagen	1–0 (2–0 agg.)	Viborg	Copenhagen
19:00 CET	Lerager 32' (Froholdt); Hatzidiakos (yellow card) 65'	Report	Radić (yellow card) 79'; Ementa (yellow card) 90+1'	Stadium: Parken; Attendance: 26,441; Referee: Morten Krogh

==== Finals ====
29 May 2025 Final	Copenhagen	3–0	Silkeborg	Herning
17:00 CET	Larsson 3' (Elyounoussi); Lerager 34' (Larsson); Elyounoussi 38'; Claesson (yellow card) 45+6'; Achouri (yellow card) 57'; Falk (yellow card) 77'	Report		Stadium: MCH Arena; Attendance: 11,408; Referee: Jacob Karlsen

=== UEFA Conference League ===
==== Second qualifying round ====
25 July 2024 First Leg	FCB Magpies (Gibraltar)	0–3	Copenhagen	Europa Point, Gibraltar
19:00 CEST	Carrascal (yellow card) 57'	Report	Óskarsson (yellow card) 7'; Elyounoussi 30' (Óskarsson); Claesson 62' (Mattsson); Froholdt 65' (Diks)	Stadium: Europa Point Stadium; Attendance: 750; Referee: Cláudio Filipe Ruivo Pereira (Portugal)

1 August 2024 Second Leg	Copenhagen	5–1 (8–1 agg.)	(Gibraltar) FCB Magpies	Copenhagen
18:00 CEST	Diks 40' (pen.); Froholdt 54' (Lerager); Óskarsson 61' 84'; Falk (yellow card) 66'; Højer 80' (Elyounoussi)	Report	Bayode 16'; Storer (yellow card) 26'; García (yellow card) 33'; Orihuela (yellow card) 79'	Stadium: Parken; Attendance: 16,595; Referee: Dumitri Muntean (Moldova)

==== Third qualifying round ====
7 August 2024 First Leg	Copenhagen	1–0	(Czech Republic) Baník Ostrava	Copenhagen
19:00 CEST	Froholdt 90+1' (Lerager)	Report	Prekop (yellow card) 63'; Kpozo (yellow card) 86'	Stadium: Parken; Attendance: 16,513; Referee: Nathan Verboomen (Belgium)

15 August 2024 Second Leg	Baník Ostrava (Czech Republic)	1–0 (a.e.t.) (1–1 agg.) (1–2 p)	Copenhagen	Ostrava, Czech Republic
19:00 CEST	Prekop 42' (yellow card) 48'; Buchta (yellow card) 45+1'; Juroška (yellow card) 106'	Report	Elyounoussi (yellow card) 36'; Meling (yellow card) 46'; Garananga (yellow card) 57'; Achouri (yellow card) 65'; Clem (yellow card) 76'	Stadium: Městský stadion Attendance: 14,458; Referee: Stuart Attwell (England)
	Penalties
	Klíma (penalty missed); Ewerton (penalty missed); Kubala (penalty scored); Frydrych (penalty missed); Chaluš (penalty missed)		(penalty missed) Óskarsson; (penalty scored) Mattsson; (penalty missed) Elyounoussi; (penalty scored) Achouri

==== Play-off round ====
22 August 2024 First Leg	Copenhagen	2–0	(Scotland) Kilmarnock	Copenhagen
19:00 CEST	Vavro (yellow card) 17'; Diks (yellow card) 60' (goal) 76' (pen.); Elyounoussi (yellow card) 80'; Falk 90+6'	Report	Wright (yellow card) 60'; O'Hara (yellow card) 76'; Bainbridge (yellow card) 90+1'	Stadium: Parken; Attendance: 16,971; Referee: Fabio Maresca (Italy)

29 August 2024 Second Leg	Kilmarnock (Scotland)	1–1 (1–3 agg.)	Copenhagen	Kilmarnock, Scotland
20:00 CEST	Watkins 16'; Armstrong (yellow card) 57'	Report	Lerager (yellow card) 50'; Mayo 67' (o.g.)	Stadium: Rugby Park; Attendance: 8,083; Referee: Radoslav Gidzhenov (Bulgaria)

==== League phase ====
===== League phase table =====
Pos	Team	Pld	W	D	L	GF	GA	GD	Pts	Qualification
16	(German Football Association) 1. FC Heidenheim	6	3	1	2	7	7	0	10	Advance to knockout phase play-offs (seeded)
17	(Royal Belgian Football Association) Gent	6	3	0	3	8	8	0	9	Advance to knockout phase play-offs (unseeded)
18	(Danish Football Association) Copenhagen	6	2	2	2	8	9	−1	8	Advance to knockout phase play-offs (unseeded)
19	(Football Association of Iceland) Víkingur Reykjavík	6	2	2	2	7	8	−1	8	Advance to knockout phase play-offs (unseeded)
20	(Football Association of Bosnia and Herzegovina) Borac Banja Luka	6	2	2	2	4	7	−3	8	Advance to knockout phase play-offs (unseeded)

Source: UEFA
Rules for classification: League phase tiebreakers

===== Results by round =====
Round	1	2	3	4	5	6
Ground	H	A	H	A	H	A
Result	L	D	D	W	W	L
Position	23	25	29	19	16	18
Points	0	1	2	5	8	8

Updated to match(es) played on 19 December 2024. Source: UEFA
A = Away; H = Home; W = Win; D = Draw; L = Loss; P = Postponed

3 October 2024 Matchday 1	Copenhagen	1–2	(Poland) Jagiellonia Białystok	Copenhagen
21:00 CEST	Hatziadiakos 12' (López); López (yellow card) 26'; Cornelius (yellow card) 79'	Report	Hansen (yellow card) 40'; Pululu; Nguiamba (yellow card) 52'; Sáček (yellow card) 66'; Silva (yellow card) 78'; Abramowicz (yellow card) 86'; Churilnov 90+7' (Pululu)	Stadium: Parken; Attendance: 22,393; Referee: Rob Harvey (Ireland)

24 October 2024 Matchday 2	Real Betis (Spain)	1–1	Copenhagen	Seville, Spain
21:00 CEST	Ezzalzouli 8' (Ávila); Aitor Ruibal (yellow card) 37'; Ávila (yellow card) 76'; Pablo Fornals (yellow card) 77'	Report	Elyounoussi (yellow card) 32'; Diks 77' (pen.) (yellow card) 86'; Achouri (yellow card) 81'	Stadium: Estadio Benito Villamarín; Attendance: 45,702; Referee: Willy Delajod (France)

7 November 2024 Matchday 3	Copenhagen	2–2	(Turkey) İstanbul Başakşehir	Copenhagen
21:00 CET	Diks (yellow card) 10'; López (yellow card) 13'; Onugkha (yellow card) 21'; Chiakha 79' 83' (López)	Report	Ba (yellow card) 17'; Kény 26'; Özdemir (yellow card) 45+1'; Davidson (yellow card) 55'; Türüç (yellow card) 70'; Piątek 80' (yellow card) 90+4'; Lucas Lima (yellow card) 82'	Stadium: Parken; Attendance: 23,070; Referee: Joey Kooij (Netherlands)

28 November 2024 Matchday 4	Dinamo Minsk (Belarus)	1–2	Copenhagen	Sumgayit, Azerbaijan
18:45 CET	Adeola 13'; Zherdev (yellow card) 24'; Kulikov (yellow card) 30'	Report	Elyounoussi 6' (Claesson); Delaney (yellow card) 29'; Diks 55' (pen.); Hatzidiakos (yellow card) 88'	Stadium: Mehdi Huseynzade Stadium (Note: Due to the country's involvement in the Russian invasion of Ukraine, Belarusian teams are required to play their home matches at neutral venues and behind closed doors until further notice. Therefore, Dinamo Minsk play their home matches at Sumgayit City Stadium, Sumgait, Azerbaijan, instead of their regular stadium, Dinamo Stadium, Minsk.); Attendance: 0 (closed to spectators); Referee: Michal Očenáš (Slovakia)

12 December 2024 Matchday 5	Copenhagen	2–0	(Scotland) Hearts	Copenhagen
18:45 CET	Chiakha 48'; Diks 78' (pen.)	Report	Boateng (yellow card) 38'; Forrester (yellow card) 51'; Devlin (yellow card) 82'	Stadium: Parken; Attendance: 24,207; Referee: Andrea Colombo (Italy)

19 December 2024 Matchday 6	Rapid Wien (Austria)	3–0	Copenhagen	Vienna, Austria
21:00 CET	Grgić (yellow card) 32'; Beljo 45+2' (Cvetković); Wurmbrand 51' 64' (Jansson); Jansson (yellow card) 58'; Cvetković (yellow card) 90+7'	Report	Robert (yellow card) 32'; Elyounoussi (yellow card) 45+3'; Huescas (yellow card) 48'; Diks (yellow card) 57'	Stadium: Weststadion; Attendance: 24,665; Referee: John Beaton (Scotland)

==== Knockout Phase Play-offs ====
13 February 2025 First Leg	Copenhagen	1–2	(Germany) 1. FC Heidenheim	Copenhagen
21:00 CET	Larsson 45+1' (López) (yellow card) 50'; Huescas (yellow card) 58'; Gocholeishvili (yellow card) 83'	Report	Keller 59' (Siersleben); Mainka (yellow card) 65'; Siersleben 85'	Stadium: Parken; Attendance: 22,789; Referee: Anastasios Papapetrou (Greece)

20 February 2025 Second Leg	1. FC Heidenheim (Germany)	1–3 (a.e.t.) (3–4 agg.)	Copenhagen	Heidenheim
18:45 CET	Föhrenbach (yellow card) 52'; Léo Scienza 73'; Beck (yellow card) 90+6'	Report	Chiakha 47' (Diks); Diks 53' (pen.); Meling (yellow card) 69'; Gabriel Pereira (yellow card) 72'; Huescas 114'; Ramaj (yellow card) 120+2'	Stadium: FCH Arena Heidenheim; Attendance: 12,336; Referee: Nikola Dabanović (Montenegro)

==== Round of 16 ====
6 March 2025 First Leg	Copenhagen	1–2	(England) Chelsea	Copenhagen
18:45 CET	Diks (yellow card) 77'; Gabriel Pereira 79' (López); Chiakha (yellow card) 87'; Hatzidiakos (yellow card) 90'; López (yellow card) 90'	Report	James 46' (Cucurella); Fernández 65' (George) (yellow card) 87'	Stadium: Parken; Attendance: 35,859; Referee: Georgi Kabakov (Bulgaria)

13 March 2025 Second Leg	Chelsea (England)	1–0 (3–1 agg.)	Copenhagen	London, England
21:00 CET	Dewsbury-Hall 55'; Cucurella (yellow card) 69'; Adarabioyo (yellow card) 85'	Report	Achouri (yellow card) 76'	Stadium: Stamford Bridge; Referee: Radu Petrescu (Romania)

== Statistics ==
As of 29 May 2025

=== Appearances and goals ===
No.	Pos	Nat	Player	Total		Superliga		Danish Cup		Conference League	
No.	Pos	Nat	Player	Apps	Goals	Apps	Goals	Apps	Goals	Apps	Goals
1	GK	(England) ENG	Nathan Trott	30	0	17	0	3	0	10	0
2	DF	(Indonesia) IDN	Kevin Diks	44	11	19+5	5	4+1	0	15	6
4	DF	(Zimbabwe) ZIM	Munashe Garananga	20	0	7+4	0	4+1	0	2+2	0
5	DF	(Brazil) BRA	Gabriel Pereira	41	4	24+1	3	3+2	0	10+1	1
6	DF	(Greece) GRE	Pantelis Hatzidiakos	40	3	24	1	5+2	1	8+1	1
7	MF	(Sweden) SWE	Viktor Claesson	45	8	15+13	6	4+2	1	10+1	1
8	MF	(Denmark) DEN	Magnus Mattsson	52	3	15+14	3	3+4	0	7+9	0
10	MF	(Norway) NOR	Mohamed Elyounoussi	48	11	21+6	8	4+2	1	13+2	2
11	FW	(Sweden) SWE	Jordan Larsson	33	11	18+1	8	4+1	2	3+6	1
12	MF	(Denmark) DEN	Lukas Lerager	42	4	16+8	1	4+3	3	8+3	0
13	DF	(Mexico) MEX	Rodrigo Huescas	35	2	16+3	1	5	0	8+3	1
14	FW	(Denmark) DEN	Andreas Cornelius	32	3	12+7	3	3+4	0	1+5	0
15	DF	(Peru) PER	Marcos López	30	0	15+2	0	6	0	5+2	0
16	MF	(Brazil) BRA	Robert	29	3	9+4	2	4+2	1	5+5	0
17	MF	(Denmark) DEN	Victor Froholdt	53	6	21+9	3	6+1	0	9+7	3
19	FW	(Algeria) ALG	Amin Chiakha	29	7	4+13	2	1+2	1	5+4	4
22	DF	(Georgia (country)) GEO	Giorgi Gocholeishvili	33	1	15+6	1	0+2	0	5+5	0
24	DF	(Norway) NOR	Birger Meling	19	0	7+3	0	0+1	0	7+1	0
27	MF	(Denmark) DEN	Thomas Delaney	37	6	20+4	5	2+1	1	8+2	0
30	MF	(Tunisia) TUN	Elias Achouri	36	2	15+8	2	3	0	7+3	0
31	GK	(Iceland) ISL	Rúnar Alex Rúnarsson	1	0	0	0	0	0	1	0
33	MF	(Denmark) DEN	Rasmus Falk	21	1	4+8	0	0+2	0	5+2	1
36	MF	(Denmark) DEN	William Clem	26	1	6+7	0	4	1	7+2	0
38	MF	(Denmark) DEN	Oliver Højer	6	1	0+2	0	0+1	0	0+3	1
40	MF	(Sweden) SWE	Roony Bardghji	6	0	2+3	0	0+1	0	0	0
41	GK	(Germany) GER	Diant Ramaj	19	0	12	0	3	0	4	0
Players who are away on loan:
	DF	(Slovakia) SVK	Denis Vavro	10	0	3+2	0	0	0	5	0
	FW	(Russia) RUS	German Onugkha	7	0	3+1	0	1	0	1+1	0
	GK	(Denmark) DEN	Theo Sander	5	0	3	0	1	0	1	0
Players who left during the season:
	MF	(Portugal) POR	Diogo Gonçalves	2	1	2	1	0	0	0	0
	FW	(Iceland) ISL	Orri Óskarsson	12	7	5+1	5	0	0	4+2	2
	DF	(Denmark) DEN	Christian Sørensen	3	0	0+1	0	0	0	1+1	0

=== Goal scorers ===
Place	Position	Nation	Number	Name	Superliga	Pokalen	Conference League	Total
1	DF	(Indonesia)	2	Kevin Diks	5	0	6	11
1	MF	(Norway)	10	Mohamed Elyounoussi	8	1	2	11
1	FW	(Sweden)	11	Jordan Larsson	8	2	1	11
4	MF	(Sweden)	7	Viktor Claesson	6	1	1	8
5	FW	(Algeria)	19	Amin Chiakha	2	1	4	7
6	MF	(Denmark)	17	Victor Froholdt	3	0	3	6
6	MF	(Denmark)	27	Thomas Delaney	5	1	0	6
8	DF	(Brazil)	5	Gabriel Pereira	3	0	1	4
8	MF	(Denmark)	12	Lukas Lerager	1	3	0	4
10	DF	(Greece)	6	Pantelis Hatzidiakos	1	1	1	3
10	MF	(Brazil)	16	Robert	2	1	0	3
10	MF	(Denmark)	8	Magnus Mattsson	3	0	0	3
10	FW	(Denmark)	14	Andreas Cornelius	3	0	0	3
13	DF	(Mexico)	13	Rodrigo Huescas	1	0	1	2
13	MF	(Tunisia)	30	Elias Achouri	2	0	0	2
15	MF	(Denmark)	38	Oliver Højer	0	0	1	1
15	MF	(Denmark)	33	Rasmus Falk	0	0	1	1
15	MF	(Denmark)	36	William Clem	0	1	0	1
15	DF	(Georgia (country))	22	Giorgi Gocholeishvili	1	0	0	1
Opponent's own goal(s)					0	1	1	2
Players who left during the season:
	MF	(Portugal)		Diogo Gonçalves	1	0	0	1
	FW	(Iceland)		Orri Óskarsson	5	0	2	7
Total					60	13	25	98

=== Assists ===
Place	Position	Nation	Number	Name	Superliga	Pokalen	Conference League	Total
1	MF	(Norway)	10	Mohamed Elyounoussi	7	1	1	9
2	MF	(Sweden)	7	Viktor Claesson	4	1	1	6
2	DF	(Peru)	15	Marcos López	3	0	3	6
4	DF	(Indonesia)	2	Kevin Diks	3	0	2	5
4	FW	(Denmark)	14	Andreas Cornelius	4	1	0	5
4	MF	(Tunisia)	30	Elias Achouri	5	0	0	5
7	MF	(Denmark)	8	Magnus Mattsson	1	1	1	3
7	MF	(Brazil)	16	Robert	3	0	0	3
7	MF	(Denmark)	27	Thomas Delaney	3	0	0	3
7	MF	(Denmark)	17	Victor Froholdt	2	1	0	3
7	FW	(Sweden)	11	Jordan Larsson	2	1	0	3
12	MF	(Denmark)	12	Lukas Lerager	0	0	2	2
12	DF	(Greece)	6	Pantelis Hatzidiakos	2	0	0	2
12	DF	(Mexico)	13	Rodrigo Huescas	2	0	0	2
15	MF	(Denmark)	33	Rasmus Falk	1	0	0	1
15	DF	(Georgia (country))	22	Giorgi Gocholeishvili	1	0	0	1
15	DF	(Peru)	15	Marcos López	0	0	1	1
15	MF	(Brazil)	5	Gabriel Pereira	1	0	0	1
15	DF	(Georgia (country))	22	Giorgi Gocholeishvili	1	0	0	1
Players who left during the season:
	FW	(Iceland)		Orri Óskarsson	0	0	1	1
Total					45	6	12	63

=== Clean sheets ===
Place	Position	Nation	Number	Name	Superliga	Pokalen	Conference League	Total
1	GK	(England)	1	Nathan Trott	4	2	4	10
1	GK	(Germany)	41	Diant Ramaj	7	3	0	10
Total					11	5	4	20

=== Disciplinary record ===
Number	Nation	Position	Name	Superliga			Pokalen			Conference League			Total		
Number	Nation	Position	Name	Yellow card	(yellow card) (yellow-red card)	Red card	Yellow card	(yellow card) (yellow-red card)	Red card	Yellow card	(yellow card) (yellow-red card)	Red card	Yellow card	(yellow card) (yellow-red card)	Red card
2	(Indonesia) (Netherlands)	DF	Kevin Diks	2	0	0	1	0	0	5	0	0	8	0	0
4	(Zimbabwe)	DF	Munashe Garananga	0	0	0	0	0	0	1	0	0	1	0	0
5	(Brazil)	DF	Gabriel Pereira	5	0	0	0	0	0	1	0	0	6	0	0
6	(Greece)	DF	Pantelis Hatzidiakos	7	0	0	1	0	0	2	0	0	10	0	0
7	(Sweden)	MF	Viktor Claesson	1	0	0	1	0	0	0	0	0	2	0	0
8	(Denmark)	MF	Magnus Mattsson	2	0	0	0	0	0	0	0	0	2	0	0
10	(Norway)	MF	Mohamed Elyounoussi	0	0	0	0	0	0	4	0	0	4	0	0
11	(Sweden)	FW	Jordan Larsson	3	0	0	0	0	0	1	0	0	4	0	0
12	(Denmark)	MF	Lukas Lerager	3	0	0	1	0	0	1	0	0	5	0	0
13	(Mexico)	DF	Rodrigo Huescas	5	0	0	2	0	0	2	0	0	9	0	0
14	(Denmark)	FW	Andreas Cornelius	4	0	0	1	0	0	1	0	0	6	0	0
15	(Peru)	DF	Marcos López	2	0	1	0	0	0	3	0	0	5	0	1
16	(Brazil)	MF	Robert	0	0	0	0	0	0	1	0	0	1	0	0
17	(Denmark)	MF	Victor Froholdt	4	0	0	0	0	0	0	0	0	4	0	0
19	(Algeria) (Denmark)	FW	Amin Chiakha	2	0	0	0	0	0	1	0	0	3	0	0
22	(Georgia (country))	DF	Giorgi Gocholeishvili	3	0	0	0	0	0	1	0	0	4	0	0
24	(Denmark)	DF	Birger Meling	0	0	0	0	0	0	2	0	0	2	0	0
27	(Denmark)	MF	Thomas Delaney	8	0	0	1	0	0	1	0	0	10	0	0
30	(Tunisia) (France)	MF	Elias Achouri	5	0	0	1	0	0	3	0	0	9	0	0
33	(Denmark)	MF	Rasmus Falk	0	0	0	1	0	0	1	0	0	2	0	0
36	(Denmark)	MF	William Clem	1	0	0	0	0	0	1	0	0	2	0	0
41	(Germany)	GK	Diant Ramaj	2	1	0	0	0	0	1	0	0	3	1	0
Players who are away on loan:
	(Slovakia)	DF	Denis Vavro	1	0	0	0	0	0	1	0	0	2	0	0
	(Russia) (Nigeria)	FW	German Onugkha	0	0	0	0	0	0	1	0	0	1	0	0
Players who left during the season:
	(Iceland)	FW	Orri Óskarsson	0	0	0	0	0	0	1	0	0	1	0	0
Total				60	1	1	10	0	0	36	0	0	106	1	1

== Home attendance ==
As of 25 May 2025

Competition	Total	Games	Average
Superliga	451,280	16	28,205
Danish Cup	40,446	2	20,223
Conference League	184,397	8	23,050
Total	676,123	26	26,004
