= German Onugkha =

Russian footballer (born 1996)

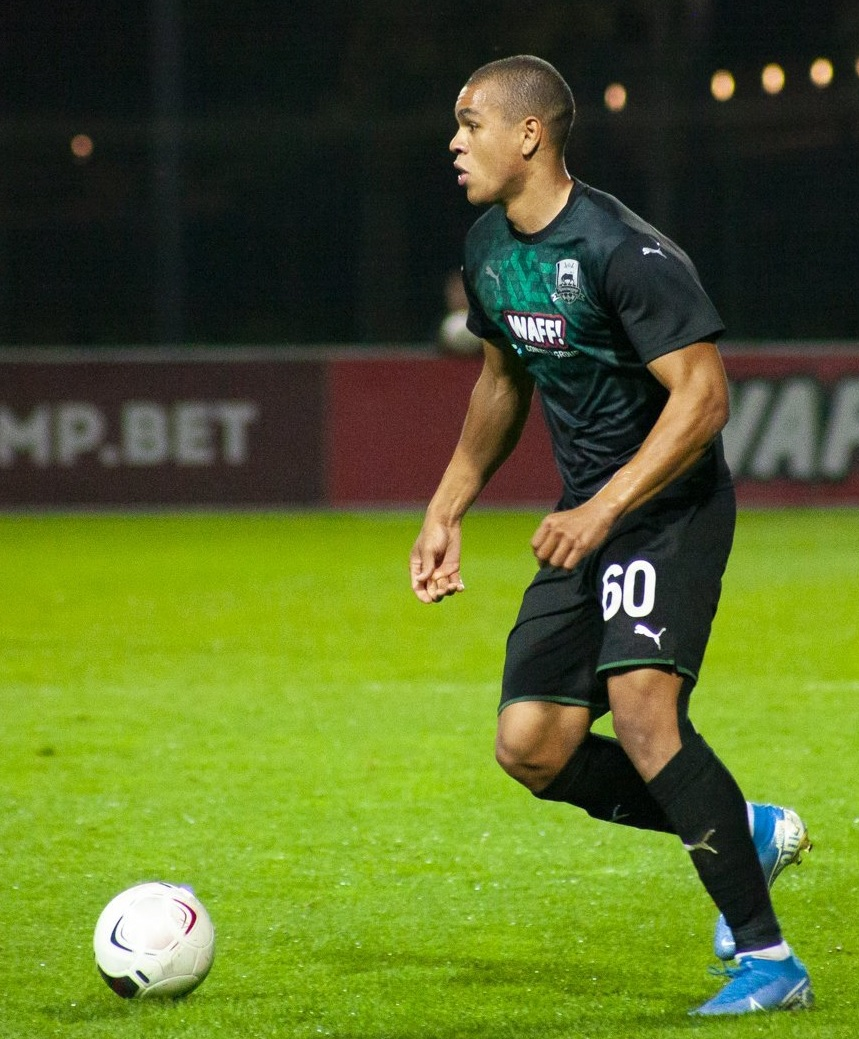
- Onugkha with Krasnodar-2 in 2019

Personal information
- Full name: German Olegovich Onugkha
- Date of birth: 6 July 1996 (age 30)
- Place of birth: Moscow, Russia
- Height: 1.93 m (6 ft 4 in)
- Position: Forward

Team information
- Current team: Rodina Moscow
- Number: 7

Youth career
- 2016: Torpedo Tamala
- 2016: Narovchat
- 2016: Atmis Kevdo-Melsitovo
- 2016–2017: Zenit-M Penza

Senior career*
Years	Team	Apps	(Gls)
2017	Zenit Penza	11	(2)
2018	Volgar Astrakhan	10	(3)
2019–2021	Krasnodar	2	(0)
2018–2020	→ Krasnodar-2 (loan)	59	(17)
2020	→ Tambov (loan)	11	(4)
2021	→ Vejle (loan)	17	(5)
2021–2024	Vejle	51	(24)
2021	→ Krylia Sovetov (loan)	4	(0)
2021–2022	→ Rubin Kazan (loan)	23	(2)
2022	→ Bnei Sakhnin (loan)	8	(0)
2024–2025	Copenhagen	5	(0)
2025	→ Vejle (loan)	15	(10)
2025–2026	Kayserispor	27	(8)
2026–	Rodina Moscow	9	(2)
- * Club domestic league appearances and goals as of 22 November 2026

German Olegovich Onugkha (Russian: Герман Олегович Ону́гха; born 6 July 1996) is a Russian professional footballer who plays as a forward for Russian Premier League club Rodina Moscow.

== Club career ==
=== Early life and youth career ===
German Olegovich Onugkha was born on 6 July 1996 in Moscow, Russia, to a Russian mother and a Nigerian father. His family relocated to his mother's hometown of Penza when he was three years old, and he was raised in Penza by his mother. As a child, Onugkha took up futsal, joining a local youth sports centre at age six; his first coach was Yuriy Fyodorovich Klopov. He played futsal throughout his childhood but stopped playing football at the age of 11 to focus on his education. Onugkha returned to the sport around the age of 14, resuming training on full-sized pitches as an adolescent. By 16, he was playing in amateur competitions and joined Atmis, a futsal club that competed in Penza Oblast's regional football championship during the summer months.

Following a friendly match against Zenit Penza, Onugkha was invited to join the club by director Dmitry Gradilenko. He made his debut in the Russian Professional Football League (PFL) under coach Vladimir Radkevich at the age of 20, going on to play 11 matches and scoring two goals during the 2017–18 season.

In February 2018, Onugkha signed with Volgar Astrakhan, a club competing in the Russian Football National League (FNL). He made his debut on 4 March 2018 in a home fixture against Khimki and recorded three goals in ten appearances for the club.

=== Krasnodar ===
He made his debut for the main squad of FC Krasnodar on 25 September 2019 in a Russian Cup game against Nizhny Novgorod. He made his Russian Premier League debut for Krasnodar on 5 July 2020 in a game against Zenit Saint Petersburg, replacing Marcus Berg in the 82nd minute.

On 11 August 2020, he joined FC Tambov on loan for the 2020–21 season, with an option to purchase. On 26 January 2021, the loan was terminated early.

=== Vejle ===
On 1 February 2021, Onugkha joined Danish Superliga club Vejle on loan from FC Krasnodar until the end of the 2020–21 season, with an option to purchase. On 4 July 2021, Krasnodar confirmed that Vejle had exercised this option and acquired Onugkha permanently.

==== Loans and return ====
Shortly after his permanent move, Onugkha was loaned to Russian Premier League side Krylia Sovetov Samara for the 2021–22 season, again including an option to buy. However, this loan was terminated early on 1 September 2021, when Onugkha moved on loan to Rubin Kazan for the remainder of the season. Rubin opted not to exercise their purchase option, and he returned to Vejle. Following a subsequent loan spell at Israeli club Bnei Sakhnin, Onugkha returned to Vejle for the latter part of the 2022–23 season, helping the team achieve promotion from the Danish 1st Division to the Danish Superliga.

==== Breakthrough with Vejle ====
During the 2023–24 Danish Superliga season, Onugkha emerged as a key player for Vejle Boldklub, scoring 15 goals in 31 league appearances and finishing as the league's top scorer. His goals played a crucial role in Vejle's successful fight against relegation. On 20 May 2024, he scored both goals in a 2–0 win over Hvidovre IF, securing the club's Superliga status for another season.

Onugkha's performances earned praise for his versatility and consistency in front of goal. Commentators described him as a complete forward, capable of scoring from distance, in the box, and with headers.

=== Copenhagen ===
Onugkha's form attracted interest from larger clubs, and in September 2024, he signed a two-year contract with reigning champions FC Copenhagen, joining as a replacement for departing striker Orri Óskarsson. Sporting director Sune Smith-Nielsen cited Onugkha's proven quality and familiarity with the league, while head coach Jacob Neestrup also praised the acquisition, stating: "He is a player who has hurt many opponents – including ourselves... His raw strength, aerial ability and finishing skills with both feet make us believe in him as a future goalscorer for F.C. Copenhagen."

However, Onugkha struggled to establish himself in Copenhagen, making four league appearances without scoring during the first half of the 2024–25 season. Often used as a substitute, he found limited opportunities and fell down the attacking pecking order by the winter break.

==== Return to Vejle (loan) ====
In January 2025, Copenhagen loaned Onugkha back to Vejle for the remainder of the season, aiming to provide him with regular playing time and an opportunity to regain confidence. Onugkha himself welcomed the return, describing it as a "win-win" for both him and Vejle. "Maybe I could have stayed in Copenhagen... but I knew 100% that if I came here I would get to play. I really need to play, I need to get my confidence again," he said upon rejoining Vejle. Vejle were again fighting to avoid relegation, and Onugkha was determined to help the team survive, noting that in 2023–24 "we did it together."

On his return, Onugkha quickly rediscovered his scoring touch, netting seven goals in his first five league matches. His contributions included a solo effort in a 3–2 win over AGF, a long-range strike against Lyngby, and two goals from corner kicks. Vejle head coach Steffen Kielstrup praised Onugkha's maturity and impact, calling his early scoring run "impressive." In recognition of his form, Onugkha was named Superliga Player of the Month for March 2025. His contributions helped Vejle escape relegation in the second to last round.

==== Return to Copenhagen ====
Ahead of the 2025–26 season, sporting director Sune Smith-Nielsen confirmed that Onugkha was not part of Copenhagen’s first-team plans, and his return to training was delayed while the club sought a transfer solution. He rejoined the squad in late July, although the club remained intent on arranging a sale. Despite the uncertainty, Onugkha made a brief appearance on 23 August as a late substitute in a 1–1 Danish Superliga draw with OB, amid ongoing transfer speculation.

=== Kayserispor ===
On 12 September 2025, Onugkha completed a permanent transfer to Turkish Süper Lig side Kayserispor, signing a two-year contract.

=== Rodina Moscow ===
On 20 August 2026, Onugka returned to Russia and signed with Rodina Moscow.

== Career statistics ==
As of match played 22 November 2026

Appearances and goals by club, season and competition
Club	Season	League			National cup (Note: Includes Russian Cup, Danish Cup)		League cup (Note: Includes Toto Cup)		Europe		Other		Total	
Club	Season	Division	Apps	Goals	Apps	Goals	Apps	Goals	Apps	Goals	Apps	Goals	Apps	Goals
Zenit Penza	2017–18	Russian Second League	11	2	—		—		—		—		11	2
Volgar Astrakhan	2017–18	Russian First League	10	3	—		—		—		—		10	3
Krasnodar-2	2018–19	Russian First League	35	5	—		—		—		5 (Note: Appearances in FNL Cup)	1	40	6
Krasnodar-2	2019–20	Russian First League	23	11	—		—		—		—		23	11
Krasnodar-2	2020–21	Russian First League	1	1	—		—		—		—		1	1
Krasnodar-2	Total		59	17	—		—		—		5	1	64	18
Krasnodar	2018–19	Russian Premier League	0	0	0	0	—		—		—		0	0
Krasnodar	2019–20	Russian Premier League	2	0	1	0	—		—		—		3	0
Krasnodar	Total		2	0	1	0	—		—		—		3	0
Tambov (loan)	2020–21	Russian Premier League	11	4	2	2	—		—		—		13	6
Vejle (loan)	2020–21	Danish Superliga	17	5	2	0	—		—		—		19	5
Krylia Sovetov Samara (loan)	2021–22	Russian Premier League	4	0	—		—		—		—		4	0
Rubin Kazan (loan)	2021–22	Russian Premier League	23	2	2	1	—		—		—		25	3
Bnei Sakhnin (loan)	2022–23	Israeli Premier League	8	0	0	0	1	0	—		—		9	0
Vejle	2022–23	Danish 1st Division	14	6	2	0	—		—		—		16	6
Vejle	2023–24	Danish Superliga	31	15	1	0	—		—		—		32	15
Vejle	2024–25	Danish Superliga	6	3	0	0	—		—		—		6	3
Vejle	Total		51	24	3	0	—		—		—		54	24
Copenhagen	2024–25	Danish Superliga	4	0	1	0	—		2 (Note: Appearances in UEFA Conference League)	0	—		7	0
Copenhagen	2025–26	Danish Superliga	1	0	0	0	—		0	0	—		1	0
Copenhagen	Total		5	0	1	0	—		2	0	—		8	0
Vejle (loan)	2024–25	Danish Superliga	15	10	0	0	—		—		—		15	10
Kayserispor	2025–26	Süper Lig	27	8	1	0	—		—		—		28	8
Rodina Moscow	2026–27	Russian Premier League	9	2	1	1	—		—		—		10	3
Career total			252	77	13	4	1	0	2	0	5	1	273	82

== Honours ==
Vejle

- Danish 1st Division: 2022–23

Copenhagen

- Danish Superliga: 2024–25
- Danish Cup: 2024–25

Individual

- Danish Superliga Golden Boot: 2023–24
- Danish Superliga Player of the Month: March 2025
