= Magnus Mattsson =

Danish footballer (born 1999)

Personal information
- Full name: Magnus Elkjær Mattsson
- Date of birth: 25 February 1999 (age 27)
- Place of birth: Marstal, Denmark
- Height: 1.74 m (5 ft 9 in)
- Position: Attacking midfielder

Team information
- Current team: Copenhagen
- Number: 8

Youth career
- –2012: ØBG Fodbold
- 2012–2017: Silkeborg

Senior career*
Years	Team	Apps	(Gls)
2017–2021	Silkeborg	66	(26)
2021–2024	NEC	71	(19)
2024–	Copenhagen	50	(7)

International career
2017	Denmark U18	1	(0)
2017–2018	Denmark U19	7	(1)
2018	Denmark U20	2	(0)
2019	Denmark U21	1	(0)
- * Club domestic league appearances and goals as of 23 August 2025

Magnus Elkjær Mattsson (born 25 February 1999) is a Danish professional footballer who plays as an attacking midfielder for Danish Superliga club Copenhagen.

== Club career ==
=== Silkeborg ===
Mattsson started his career at ØBG Fodbold in Silkeborg. He played there until 2012 where he moved to Silkeborg IF at the age of 13 years. He made his debut for Silkeborg IF's first team in the Danish Superliga on 25 August 2017 against Hobro IK. He was also a starter in the cup final in the 2017–18 Danish Cup, where Mattsson and Silkeborg were up against Brøndby IF. The match ended with a 3–1 win for Brøndby IF. At the end of 2018, Mattsson was named player of the year in Silkeborg IF. A few months later, Silkeborg was relegated to the Danish 1st Division.

In March 2019, Mattsson suffered a long-term injury in his groin, which kept him on the sidelines for half a year. However, with 20 appearances and 6 goals in the league during the season, Mattsson helped Silkeborg with promotion to the Danish Superliga again for the 2019–20 season. To gain some game fitness after being injured for half a year, Mattsson was called up for a U19 game in September 2019. Unluckily, Mattsson suffered an injury to his left anterior cruciate ligament in that game and was again out for a longer period. Having undergone knee surgery, he was in recovery until the end of the 2019–20 season.

=== NEC ===
On 28 June 2021, it was confirmed that Mattsson had been sold to Dutch club NEC, signing a deal until June 2024 with an option for one further year.

=== Copenhagen ===
Mattsson joined Copenhagen on 1 February 2024 signing a contract with the Danish side through the 2027–28 campaign. He debuted for the club on 13 February 2024 by scoring in the first leg of the Champions League Round of 16 against Manchester City in a 3–1 loss.

== Personal life ==
Mattsson's younger brother, Pelle Mattsson, is also a footballer, playing for Norwich City FC. Their father, Joakim Mattsson, is a Swedish football manager.

Beside football, Mattsson is also a music producer and creates beats for American musicians.

== Career statistics ==
As of match played 27 August 2025

Appearances and goals by club, season and competition
Club	Season	League			National cup (Note: Includes Danish Cup, KNVB Cup)		Europe		Total	
Club	Season	Division	Apps	Goals	Apps	Goals	Apps	Goals	Apps	Goals
Silkeborg	2017–18	Danish Superliga	18	1	4	1	—		22	2
Silkeborg	2018–19	Danish 1st Division	20	6	2	1	—		22	7
Silkeborg	2019–20	Danish 1st Division	0	0	0	0	—		0	0
Silkeborg	2020–21	Danish 1st Division	28	19	2	3	—		30	22
Silkeborg	Total		66	26	8	5	—		74	31
NEC Nijmegen	2021–22	Eredivisie	27	4	3	0	—		30	4
NEC Nijmegen	2022–23	Eredivisie	25	4	1	0	—		26	4
NEC Nijmegen	2023–24	Eredivisie	19	11	3	2	—		22	13
NEC Nijmegen	Total		71	19	7	2	—		78	21
Copenhagen	2023–24	Danish Superliga	13	2	0	0	2 (Note: Appearances in UEFA Champions League)	1	15	3
Copenhagen	2024–25	Danish Superliga	31	3	7	0	15 (Note: Appearances in UEFA Conference League)	0	52	3
Copenhagen	2025–26	Danish Superliga	6	2	0	0	5	3	11	5
Copenhagen	Total		50	7	7	0	22	4	78	11
Career total			186	52	22	7	22	4	230	62

== Honours ==
Silkeborg

- Danish 1st Division: 2019–20

Copenhagen

- Danish Superliga: 2024–25
- Danish Cup: 2024–25

Individual

- Danish 1st Division Player of the Season: 2020–21
- Danish Superliga Team of the Month: March 2024
