= Giorgi Gocholeishvili =

Georgian footballer (born 2001)

Giorgi Gocholeishvili გიორგი გოჩოლეიშვილი
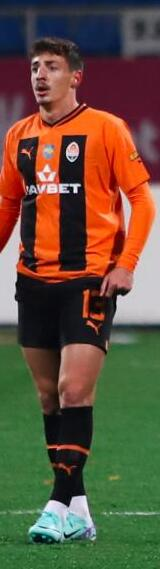
- Gocholeishvili with Shakhtar Donetsk in 2023

Personal information
- Date of birth: 14 February 2001 (age 25)
- Place of birth: Kutaisi, Georgia
- Height: 1.78 m (5 ft 10 in)
- Position: Right-back

Team information
- Current team: Cádiz (on loan from Shakhtar Donetsk)
- Number: 12

Youth career
- Saburtalo Tbilisi

Senior career*
Years	Team	Apps	(Gls)
2020–2022	Saburtalo Tbilisi	69	(8)
2023–	Shakhtar Donetsk	31	(1)
2024–2025	→ Copenhagen (loan)	21	(1)
2025–2026	→ Hamburger SV (loan)	24	(0)
2026–	→ Cádiz (loan)	0	(0)

International career^{‡}
2021–2023	Georgia U21	11	(1)
2022–	Georgia	20	(0)
- * Club domestic league appearances and goals as of 18 May 2026 ‡ National team caps and goals as of 22:04, 29 March 2026 (UTC)

Giorgi Gocholeishvili (Order of Honor) (Georgian: გიორგი გოჩოლეიშვილი; born 14 February 2001) is a Georgian professional footballer who plays as a right-back for Segunda División club Cádiz, on loan from Ukrainian Premier League club Shakhtar Donetsk, and the Georgia national team.

He has won the Ukrainian Premier League and the Georgian Cup.

== Club career ==
=== Saburtalo ===
Giorgi Gocholeishvili was born in Kutaisi and is a product of the Saburtalo Tbilisi academy. He made his debut for the club in the 2020–21 UEFA Europa League first qualifying round match against Cypriot club Apollon Limassol on 27 August 2020, which Saburtalo would go on to lose 5–1. He made his league debut for the club on 13 September 2020 in a 2020 Erovnuli Liga match against Merani Tbilisi, which ended in a 0–0 draw. By 2021, Gocholeishvili had become a starting player for the team and would help them win the 2021 Georgian Cup after a 1–0 win against Samgurali Tsqaltubo in the final, his first ever trophy.

At the end of 2022, Gocholeishvili was named in the best XI players of the 2022 Erovnuli Liga season.

In total he played 85 matches, scored 8 goals and assisted 12 for Saburtalo Tbilisi.

=== Shakhtar Donetsk ===
In November 2022 he signed a five-year contract with the Ukrainian Premier League giant Shakhtar Donetsk effective from 1 January 2023. He made his debut for Shakhtar Donetsk as a substitute player against Mynai on 28 February 2023.

Gocholeishvili netted his first goal for the club in a 2–2 draw against Chernomorets Odesa on 2 April 2023. In his first full UEFA Champions League game against Barcelona on 8 November, Gocholeishvili displayed an impressive performance, provided an assist for the only goal of the match and subsequently got a reward by being named in Champions League Team of the Week. He has won the league twice with Shakhtar.

==== Loan to Copenhagen ====
On 29 July 2024, Danish Superliga club Copenhagen announced signing Gocholeishvili on a year-long loan deal. The player made a debut for his new club in a UEFA Conference League qualifier against Czech side Banik ten days later.

Gocholeishvili won the Danish league and cup with the team in May 2025.

==== Loan to Hamburger SV ====
On 7 August 2025, Gocholeishvili joined German Bundesliga club Hamburger SV, on a one-year loan for the 2025–26 season.

==== Loan to Cádiz ====
On 20 August 2026, Gocholeishvili was announced at Segunda División side Cádiz also on loan.

== International career ==
=== Youth ===
Gocholeishvili played for the Georgia national under-21 football team for the first time in a 4–1 friendly win over Belarus in March 2021. He shone in a 3–2 friendly win against England on 16 November 2021, when he netted and provided an assist. Additionally, Gocholeishvili won an annual Goal of the Year award, given by GFF in honour of the most spectacular goal scored during the entire season.

=== Senior ===
Gocholeishvili was called up to the Georgia national football team for the first time in November 2022 by Willy Sagnol. Gocholeishvili made his debut for his country in the friendly match against Morocco on 17 November. He was called up to the Georgia team that competed in Euro 2024.

== Personal life ==
Gocholeishvili is married to Anna Okruashvili. Their first child Aleksandre was born in March 2024.

== Career statistics ==
=== Club ===
As of match played 2 May 2026

Appearances and goals by club, season and competition
Club	Season	League			National cup (Note: Includes Georgian Cup, Ukrainian Cup, Danish Cup, DFB-Pokal)		Continental		Other		Total	
Club	Season	Division	Apps	Goals	Apps	Goals	Apps	Goals	Apps	Goals	Apps	Goals
Saburtalo	2020	Erovnuli Liga	5	0	3	0	1 (Note: Appearance(s) in UEFA Europa League)	0	—		9	0
Saburtalo	2021	Erovnuli Liga	34	4	5	0	—		—		39	4
Saburtalo	2022	Erovnuli Liga	30	4	3	0	4 (Note: Appearances in UEFA Conference League)	0	1 (Note: Appearance in Georgian Super Cup)	0	38	4
Saburtalo	Total		69	8	11	0	5	0	1	0	86	8
Shakhtar	2022–23	Ukrainian Premier League	13	1	—		—		—		13	1
Shakhtar	2023–24	Ukrainian Premier League	17	0	1	0	5	0	—		23	0
Shakhtar	2025–26	Ukrainian Premier League	1	0	0	0	3	0	—		4	0
Shakhtar	Total		31	1	1	0	8	0	—		40	1
Copenhagen (loan)	2024–25	Danish Superliga	21	1	2	0	10	0	—		33	1
Hamburger SV (loan)	2025–26	Bundesliga	24	0	3	0	—		—		27	0
Career total			145	10	17	0	23	0	1	0	186	10

=== International ===
As of match played 29 March 2026

Appearances and goals by national team and year
National team	Year	Apps	Goals
Georgia	2022	1	0
Georgia	2023	7	0
Georgia	2024	3	0
Georgia	2025	8	0
Georgia	2026	1	0
Total		20	0

== Honours ==
Saburtalo Tbilisi

- Georgian Cup: 2021

Shakhtar Donetsk

- Ukrainian Premier League: 2022–23, 2023–24

Copenhagen

- Danish Superliga: 2024–25
- Danish Cup: 2024–25
