= Amin Chiakha =

Algerian footballer (born 2006)

Personal information
- Date of birth: 12 March 2006 (age 20)
- Place of birth: Copenhagen, Denmark
- Height: 1.91 m (6 ft 3 in)

Team information
- Current team: Rosenborg
- Number: 18

Youth career
- 2011–2017: Sundby BK
- 2017–2024: Copenhagen

Senior career*
Years	Team	Apps	(Gls)
2024–2026	Copenhagen	17	(2)
2025–2026	→ Vejle (loan)	14	(2)
2026	→ Rosenborg (loan)	17	(9)
2026–	Rosenborg	9	(10)

International career^{‡}
2022–2023	Denmark U17	9	(8)
2023–2024	Denmark U18	8	(2)
2024	Denmark U19	5	(3)
2024–	Algeria	6	(0)
- * Club domestic league appearances and goals as of 22 November 2026 ‡ National team caps and goals as of 6 October 2026

Amin Chiakha (Arabic: أمين شياخة; born 12 March 2006) is a professional footballer who plays as a striker for Eliteserien club Rosenborg. Born in Denmark and a former Danish youth international, he plays for the Algeria national team.

== Early life ==
Chiakha was born in 2006 in Denmark. He was described as "considered one of the most prominent rising talents in Algerian football". He has an Algerian father and a Danish mother.

== Club career ==
=== Copenhagen ===
As a youth player, Chiakha joined the youth academy of Danish side Copenhagen. He was the joint top scorer of the 2023–24 UEFA Youth League with seven goals. On 7 November 2024, Chiakha scored his first two senior goals in a 2–2 draw with Basaksehir in a UEFA Conference League game.

==== Loans to Vejle and Rosenborg ====
On 6 August 2025, Chiakha was loaned out to Danish Superliga club Vejle for the rest of the season. The loan agreement with Vejle was ended prematurely on 23 January 2026, allowing Chiakha to join Eliteserien side Rosenborg on a one-year loan with an option to buy.

=== Rosenborg ===
On 19 August 2026, Rosenborg triggered their buy option, signing Chiakha to a four-and-a-half-year deal.

== International career ==
Chiakha made his Algeria national team debut on 14 November 2024 in a Africa Cup of Nations qualifier against Equatorial Guinea at Estadio de Malabo. He substituted Mohamed Amoura in the 89th minute of a scoreless draw.

== Career statistics ==
=== Club ===
As of match played 22 November 2026

Appearances and goals by club, season and competition
Club	Season	League			Cup		Europe		Other		Total	
Club	Season	Division	Apps	Goals	Apps	Goals	Apps	Goals	Apps	Goals	Apps	Goals
Copenhagen	2024–25	Danish Superliga	17	2	3	1	9 (Note: Appearances in UEFA Conference League)	4	—		29	7
Copenhagen	2025–26	Danish Superliga	0	0	0	0	0	0	0	0	0	0
Copenhagen	Total		17	2	3	1	9	4	—		29	7
Vejle (loan)	2025–26	Danish Superliga	14	2	0	0	0	0	0	0	14	2
Rosenborg (loan)	2026	Eliteserien	17	9	1	1	0	0	0	0	18	10
Rosenborg	2026	Eliteserien	9	10	2	0	0	0	0	0	11	10
Rosenborg	Total		26	19	3	1	—		—		29	20
Career total			57	23	6	2	9	4	0	0	72	29

=== International ===
As of match played 6 October 2026

Appearances and goals by national team and year
National team	Year	Apps	Goals
Algeria	2024	2	0
Algeria	2026	4	0
Total		6	0

== Style of play ==
Chiakha mainly operates as a striker. He is known for his strength.

== Personal life ==
Chiakha is of Algerian descent. His heritage traces to Guelma, Algeria.

== Honours ==
Copenhagen

- Danish Superliga: 2024–25
- Danish Cup: 2024–25
