= Pantelis Chatzidiakos =

Greek footballer (born 1997)

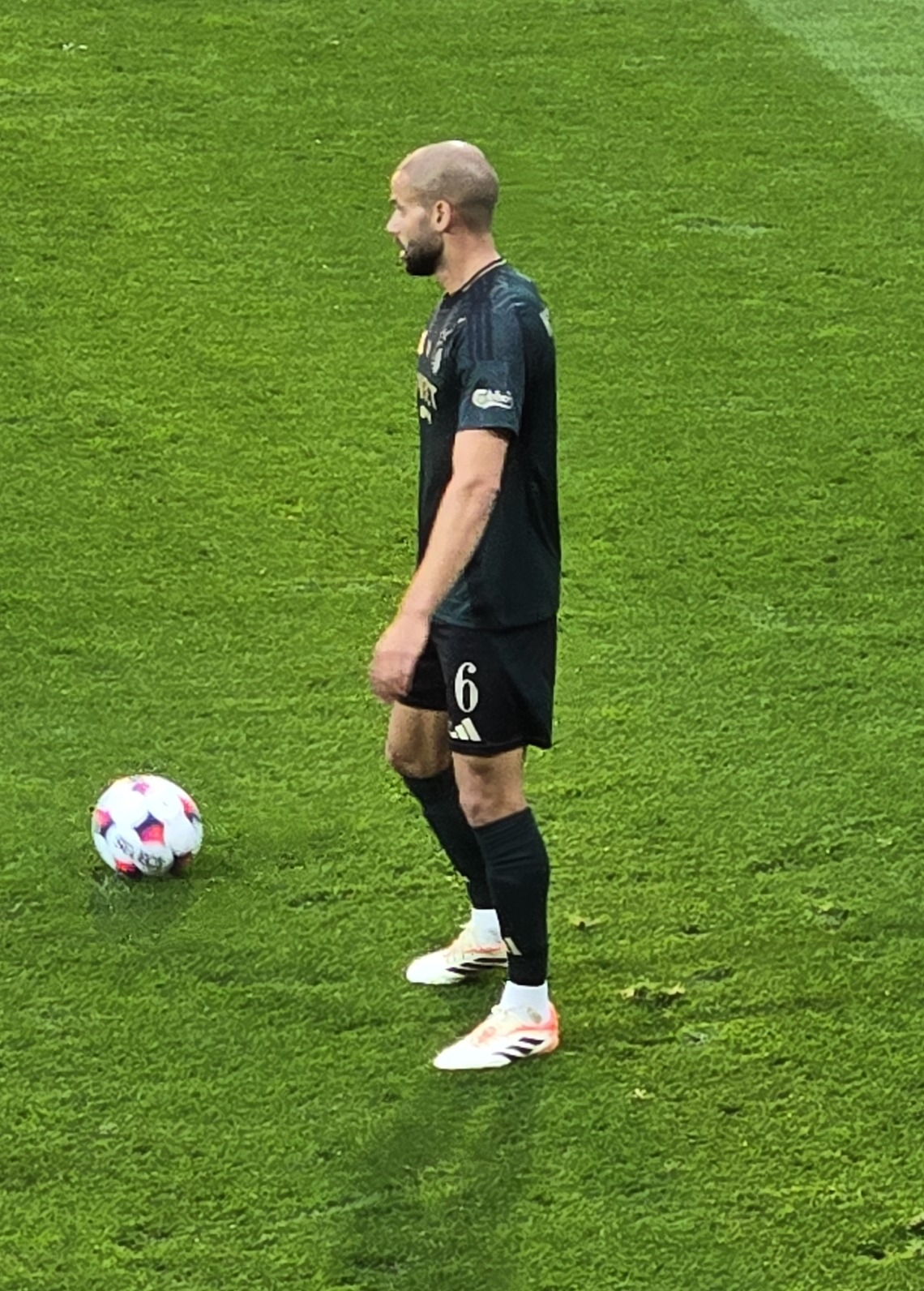
- Chatzidiakos in 2025 with Copenhagen

Personal information
- Full name: Pantelis Chatzidiakos
- Date of birth: 18 January 1997 (age 29)
- Place of birth: Rhodes, Greece
- Height: 1.85 m (6 ft 1 in)
- Position: Centre-back

Team information
- Current team: PAOK
- Number: 4

Youth career
- 2008–2011: Panathinaikos
- 2011–2015: AZ

Senior career*
Years	Team	Apps	(Gls)
2015–2023	AZ	152	(3)
2023–2025	Cagliari	13	(0)
2024–2025	→ Copenhagen (loan)	24	(1)
2025–2026	Copenhagen	28	(2)
2026–	PAOK	1	(0)

International career^{‡}
2012	Netherlands U16	2	(0)
2013	Netherlands U17	1	(0)
2014	Greece U17	1	(0)
2018–2019	Greece U21	8	(0)
2019–	Greece	41	(0)
- * Club domestic league appearances and goals as of 30 August 2026 ‡ National team caps and goals as of 7 June 2026

Pantelis Chatzidiakos (also Hatzidiakos, Greek: Παντελής Χατζηδιάκος, born 18 January 1997) is a Greek professional footballer who plays as a centre-back for Super League club PAOK and the Greece national team.

== Club career ==
=== AZ ===
In January 2015, Chatzidiakos, who moved from Panathinaikos to AZ as a youth in 2011, signed a three-year professional contract with the Dutch team. He made his debut with the club in both the Champions League and the Europa League matches. In the past, he was crowned Dutch champion with the AZ U16. In 2017 he helped Jong AZ win the title in Tweede Divisie and achieve promotion to Eerste Divisie.

He made his debut in the club, along with his first appearance in Eredivisie in a 2–1 away loss against PEC Zwolle as a substitute in the second half. On 3 December 2017, the 20-year-old Greek international central defender, scored his first goal in the Eredivisie, in a 2–0 away win against VVV-Venlo. He sealed the win in the 84th minute "With an excellent shot at the height of the area, and this is not the first goal of his career, as he scored in the KNVB Cup against MVV Maastricht in September." With this victory, Alkmaar reached 6 consecutive wins in the League. He started the 2018–19 season as the undisputed leader of the AZ's defence. On 12 August 2018, he scored his first goal for the season, with a right footed shot from very close range to the top left corner, after Oussama Idrissi's assist in a 5–0 home win game against NAC Breda.

On 2 November 2019, he scored his first goal for the 2019–20 season with a right footed after an assist from Owen Wijndal in a triumphic 3–0 home win game against FC Twente. On 7 November 2019, he lashed a thunderous effort high into the left corner, scoring his first goal in the UEFA Europa League in a hammering 5–0 away win against FC Astana. On 28 November 2019, Chatzidiakos suffered the dreaded anterior cruciate ligament injury while on UEFA Europa League game for AZ Alkmaar, medical tests have confirmed. Chatzidiakos was included in the AZ starting line-up to face Partizan Belgrade at home in the Europa League, but he was forced off in the 53rd minute with a knee injury. Subsequent medical tests this morning confirmed that the talented 22-year-old defender suffered the anterior cruciate ligament injury and will return to action after a period of at least six months.

On 7 February 2020, Alkmaar announced the extension of the contract with the Greek international until the summer of 2024.

=== Cagliari ===
On 1 September 2023, Chatzidiakos signed a four-year contract with Cagliari in Italy. Cagliari officially purchased the defender for €2m, effectively activating his release clause.

On 2 September 2024, he moved on a season-long loan to Copenhagen in Denmark.

== International career ==
As the son of a Greek father and a Dutch mother, Chatzidiakos was eligible to play for both Greece and the Netherlands. He played for the Netherlands under-16 team, but switched to Greece.

As a result of his exceptional performances he was called in the Greece U-21 team from Antonis Nikopolidis for the 2019 UEFA European Under-21 Championship qualification match against San Marino and Czech Republic on 22 and 27 March 2018 respectively.

Chatzidiakos made his first appearance with the Greece senior national team on 12 October 2019, in the game against Italy in Rome, for the Euro 2020 Qualifiers. The young defender was a starter for Greece and played the whole 90 minutes in his debut for the team.

== Personal life ==
Chatzidiakos was born in Rhodes to a Greek father and a Dutch mother.

== Career statistics ==
=== Club ===
As of match played 17 May 2026

Appearances and goals by club, season and competition
Club	Season	League			National cup (Note: Includes KNVB Cup, Coppa Italia, Danish Cup)		Europe		Total	
Club	Season	Division	Apps	Goals	Apps	Goals	Apps	Goals	Apps	Goals
AZ	2015–16	Eredivisie	4	0	1	0	1 (Note: Appearance(s) in UEFA Europa League)	0	6	0
AZ	2016–17	Eredivisie	4	0	1	0	0	0	5	0
AZ	2017–18	Eredivisie	26	1	3	1	—		29	2
AZ	2018–19	Eredivisie	17	1	4	0	2	0	23	1
AZ	2019–20	Eredivisie	11	1	0	0	9	1	20	2
AZ	2020–21	Eredivisie	23	0	1	0	6	0	30	0
AZ	2021–22	Eredivisie	32	0	3	0	7 (Note: Appearances in UEFA Conference League)	0	42	0
AZ	2022–23	Eredivisie	33	0	2	0	17	0	52	0
AZ	2023–24	Eredivisie	2	0	0	0	4	1	6	1
AZ	Total		152	3	15	1	46	2	213	6
Cagliari	2023–24	Serie A	13	0	2	0	—		15	0
Copenhagen (loan)	2024–25	Danish Superliga	24	1	7	1	9	1	40	3
Copenhagen	2025–26	Danish Superliga	28	2	5	0	12 (Note: Appearance(s) in UEFA Champions League)	0	45	2
Copenhagen	Total		52	3	12	1	21	1	85	5
Career total			217	6	29	2	67	3	313	11

=== International ===
As of match played 27 March 2026

Appearances and goals by national team and year
National team	Year	Apps	Goals
Greece	2019	4	0
Greece	2020	4	0
Greece	2021	5	0
Greece	2022	10	0
Greece	2023	7	0
Greece	2024	4	0
Greece	2025	3	0
Greece	2026	1	0
Total		39	0

== Honours ==
Copenhagen

- Danish Superliga: 2024–25
- Danish Cup: 2024–25
