= Ivan Prelec =

Croatian football manager (born 1987)

Personal information
- Date of birth: 24 July 1987 (age 39)
- Place of birth: Zagreb, SR Croatia, SFR Yugoslavia

Managerial career
- Years: Team
- 2014: Dinamo Zagreb Academy
- 2014–2017: Dinamo Zagreb U17
- 2018: Gorica
- 2019–2020: Istra 1961
- 2020–2021: Dinamo Zagreb II
- 2022–2024: Vejle
- 2025: Vejle

Ivan Prelec (born 24 July 1987) is a Croatian professional football manager.

== Managerial career ==
He started as a manager in 2006, with only 19 years. He led the youth team of Dinamo Zagreb in 2014, while later he became the manager of the U17 team.

In 2017, he went to HNK Gorica, where, at first, he served as an assistant manager, but in February 2018, he was named the head coach of the club. Managing Gorica, he won the 2017–18 Croatian Second Football League. In June 2018, he left Gorica and became the assistant manager of Legia Warsaw under the coaching staff of Dean Klafurić.

On 15 June 2019, he was named the new manager of NK Istra 1961, succeeding Igor Cvitanović.

On 15 March 2022, he became manager of Danish Superliga club Vejle Boldklub. He managed the club until 23 September 2024, when he resigned due to a bad start to the season, where Vejle had lost all 10 games.

In June 2025, Prelec returned to Vejle Boldklub as head coach, with the club announcing his reappointment effective 16 June on a two-year contract. On 3 November 2025, with Vejle bottom after taking seven points from 14 league matches, the club ended his tenure; assistants Morten Bisgaard and Steffen Kielstrup were placed in interim charge for the remainder of the autumn programme.

== Managerial statistics ==
As of match played 2 November 2025

Managerial record by team and tenure
Team	From	To	Record							
Team	From	To	G	W	D	L	GF	GA	GD	Win %
Gorica	10 January 2018	14 June 2018	14	9	3	2	6	13	−7	64.29
Istra 1961	15 July 2019	15 August 2020	42	8	10	24	59	48	+11	19.05
Dinamo Zagreb II	14 October 2020	6 April 2021	15	3	3	9	6	13	−7	20.00
Velje	15 March 2022	23 September 2024	96	39	21	36	140	119	+21	40.63
Vejle	16 June 2025	3 November 2025	17	4	4	9	27	28	−1	23.53
Total			184	63	41	80	238	221	+17	34.24

== Honours ==
=== Manager ===
HNK Gorica

- Croatian Second League: 2017–18

Vejle

- Danish 1st Division: 2022–23
