= Gabriel Pereira (footballer, born 2000) =

Brazilian footballer (born 2000)

Personal information
- Full name: Gabriel Pereira Magalhães dos Santos
- Date of birth: 7 May 2000 (age 26)
- Place of birth: Volta Redonda, Brazil
- Height: 1.88 m (6 ft 2 in)
- Position: Centre-back

Team information
- Current team: Vasco da Gama
- Number: 55

Youth career
- 2013–2017: Araruama
- 2018: Sampaio Corrêa-RJ
- 2019–2020: Volta Redonda

Senior career*
Years	Team	Apps	(Gls)
2019–2022	Volta Redonda	25	(0)
2021–2022	→ Vilafranquense (loan)	30	(0)
2022–2023	Vilafranquense	16	(0)
2023–2024	Gil Vicente	38	(4)
2024–	Copenhagen	56	(4)
2026–	→ Vasco da Gama (loan)	0	(0)
- * Club domestic league appearances and goals as of 23 August 2026

Gabriel Pereira Magalhães dos Santos (born 7 May 2000) is a Brazilian professional footballer who plays as a centre-back for Vasco da Gama, on loan from Copenhagen.

== Career ==
Pereira began playing football with his local club Araruama as a defensive midfielder for 4 years, before moving to the youth side of Sampaio Corrêa-RJ in late 2017 and transitiong to a centre-back.

In 2019, he was scouted by Volta Redonda and finished his development with their under-20s. On 27 January 2020, he signed his first professional contract with Volta Redonda until 2023.

On 3 August 2021, he moved to Liga Portugal 2 side Vilafranquense on loan with an option to buy. His option was activated for the second season, and he ended up making 46 league appearances with Vilafranquense.

On 30 January 2023, Pereira signed a three-and-a-half-year contract with Primeira Liga club Gil Vicente, for a reported fee of €650.000 for 50% of the player's economic rights.

On 8 August 2024, Pereira signed with Danish club F.C. Copenhagen on a five-year contract.

On 11 September 2026, Pereira joined Vasco da Gama on a one-year loan deal with an option to buy.

== Playing style ==
Pereira is an ambidextrous centre-back who plays as a central defender. He has been observed to attempt higher-risk actions instead of more conservative options.

== Career statistics ==
As of match played 27 August 2026

Appearances and goals by club, season and competition
Club	Season	League			State league		National cup		League cup		Continental		Other		Total	
Club	Season	Division	Apps	Goals	Apps	Goals	Apps	Goals	Apps	Goals	Apps	Goals	Apps	Goals	Apps	Goals
Volta Redonda	2020	Série C	8	0	0	0	0	0	—		—		—		8	0
Volta Redonda	2021	Série C	5	0	12 (Note: Appearances in Campeonato Carioca)	0	2	1	—		—		—		19	1
Volta Redonda	Total		13	0	12	0	2	1	—		—		—		27	1
Vilafranquense (loan)	2021–22	Liga Portugal 2	30	0	—		1	0	0	0	—		—		31	0
Vilafranquense	2022–23	Liga Portugal 2	16	0	—		0	0	2	0	—		—		18	0
Vilafranquense	Total		46	0	—		1	0	2	0	—		—		49	0
Gil Vicente	2022–23	Primeira Liga	7	0	—		0	0	0	0	—		—		7	0
Gil Vicente	2023–24	Primeira Liga	31	4	—		2	0	1	0	—		—		34	4
Gil Vicente	Total		38	4	—		2	0	1	0	—		—		41	4
Copenhagen	2024–25	Danish Superliga	26	3	—		4	0	—		12 (Note: Appearances in UEFA Conference League)	1	—		42	4
Copenhagen	2025–26	Danish Superliga	26	1	—		7	0	—		14 (Note: Appearances in UEFA Champions League)	1	0	0	47	2
Copenhagen	2026–27	Danish Superliga	4	0	—		0	0	—		4	2	0	0	8	2
Copenhagen	Total		55	4	—		11	0	—		30	4	0	0	96	8
Career total			152	6	14	0	14	1	3	0	30	4	0	0	213	10

== Honours ==
Copenhagen

- Danish Superliga: 2024–25
- Danish Cup: 2024–25

Individual

- Danish Superliga Team of the Year: 2024–25
