= Victor Froholdt =

Danish footballer (born 2006)

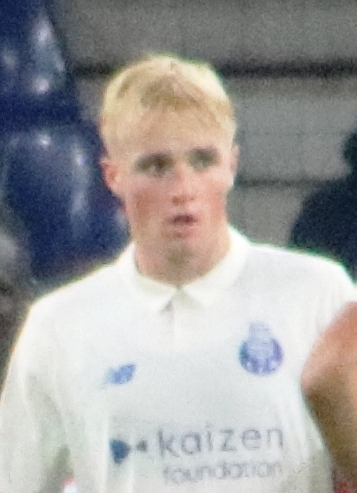
- Froholdt with Porto in 2025

Personal information
- Full name: Victor Mow Froholdt
- Date of birth: 25 February 2006 (age 20)
- Place of birth: Copenhagen, Denmark
- Height: 1.87 m (6 ft 2 in)
- Position: Midfielder

Team information
- Current team: Porto
- Number: 8

Youth career
- –2018: Vallensbæk
- 2018–2023: Copenhagen

Senior career*
Years	Team	Apps	(Gls)
2023–2025	Copenhagen	36	(4)
2025–	Porto	44	(9)

International career^{‡}
2022	Denmark U16	5	(0)
2022–2023	Denmark U17	11	(4)
2023	Denmark U18	5	(2)
2023–2024	Denmark U19	8	(1)
2025–	Denmark	18	(1)
- * Club domestic league appearances and goals as of 23:18, 8 November 2026 (UTC) ‡ National team caps and goals as of 18:40, 17 November 2026 (UTC)

Victor Mow Froholdt (born 25 February 2006) is a Danish professional footballer who plays as a midfielder for Primeira Liga club Porto and the Denmark national team.

== Club career ==
=== Copenhagen ===
Froholdt started his football career with Vallensbæk and, in 2018, moved to Copenhagen at the age of 12. There, he worked his way up through the club's youth academy and, in January 2023, was rewarded for his good performance with a contract until the end of 2025.

Froholdt made his debut for Copenhagen's first team on 27 September 2023, in a Danish Cup match against Lyseng, where he was substituted in the 57th minute in Copenhagen's 9–0 victory. Froholdt scored on his debut to make it 8–0 in the 90th minute. He made his Danish Superliga debut on 5 November 2023 in a 4–2 win over Randers, where he was substituted in the 88th minute and scored to make the final score 4–2. He finished his debut season with eight appearances for Copenhagen's first team.

On 23 July 2024, 18-year-old Froholdt was rewarded with a new contract until the summer of 2028 and was also promoted to the first team squad. In September 2024, Froholdt also got a new back number when he went from number 47 to number 17.

=== Porto ===
On 23 July 2025, it was confirmed that Froholdt moved to the Portuguese giants Porto on a contract until June 2030. According to multiple media reports, Froholdt's transfer was a record sale for Copenhagen, with a fee of €20 million plus €2 million in bonuses, as well as a 10% sell-on clause.

On 11 August 2025, Froholdt made his club debut, starting in a Primeira Liga match against Vitória de Guimarães. With four out of four possible starts, one goal against Gil Vicente, and two assists against Casa Pia and Sporting CP, the 19-year-old Froholdt was named Player of the Month in Portugal. The award came after he was also named Young Player of the Month and Midfielder of the Month.

== International career ==
Froholdt was called up to the Denmark national team in March 2025 under head coach Brian Riemer, making his debut in the second leg of the 2024–25 UEFA Nations League A quarter-final versus Portugal. He was substituted into the match to replace teammate Christian Nørgaard in the 83rd minute. Denmark would go on to lose the match 5–2 (5–3 on aggregate) in extra time.

== Career statistics ==
=== Club ===
As of match played 20 November 2026

Appearances and goals by club, season and competition
Club	Season	League			National cup (Note: Includes Danish Cup, Taça de Portugal)		League cup (Note: Includes Taça da Liga)		Europe		Other		Total	
Club	Season	Division	Apps	Goals	Apps	Goals	Apps	Goals	Apps	Goals	Apps	Goals	Apps	Goals
Copenhagen	2023–24	Danish Superliga	5	1	2	1	—		1 (Note: Appearance(s) in UEFA Champions League)	0	—		8	2
Copenhagen	2024–25	Danish Superliga	30	3	7	0	—		16 (Note: Appearances in UEFA Conference League)	3	—		53	6
Copenhagen	2025–26	Danish Superliga	1	0	—		—		—		—		1	0
Copenhagen	Total		36	4	9	1	—		17	3	—		62	8
Porto	2025–26	Primeira Liga	34	6	5	1	0	0	12 (Note: Appearances in UEFA Europa League)	1	—		51	8
Porto	2026–27	Primeira Liga	10	3	1	0	1	0	3	0	1 (Note: Appearance in Supertaça Cândido de Oliveira)	1	16	4
Porto	Total		44	9	6	1	1	0	15	1	1	1	67	12
Career total			80	13	15	2	1	0	32	4	1	1	129	20

=== International ===
As of match played 17 November 2026

Appearances and goals by national team and year
National team	Year	Apps	Goals
Denmark	2025	8	1
Denmark	2026	10	0
Total		18	1

Scores and results list Denmark's goal tally first.

List of international goals scored by Victor Froholdt
No.	Date	Cap	Venue	Opponent	Score	Result	Competition
1	9 October 2025	5	ZTE Arena, Zalaegerszeg, Hungary	Belarus	1–0	6–0	2026 FIFA World Cup qualification

== Honours ==
Copenhagen

- Danish Superliga: 2024–25
- Danish Cup: 2024–25

Porto

- Primeira Liga: 2025–26
- Supertaça Cândido de Oliveira: 2026

Individual

- Danish Superliga Young Player of the Month: February 2025, March 2025, May 2025
- Danish Superliga Young Player of the Year: 2024–25
- Danish Superliga Team of the Year: 2024–25
- Primeira Liga Player of the Month: August 2025
- Primeira Liga Young Player of the Month: August 2025
- Primeira Liga Midfielder of the Month: August 2025, April 2026
- Danish Football Player of the Year: 2025
- LPFP Primeira Liga Player of the Year: 2025–26
- Primeira Liga Young Player of the Year: 2025–26
- Primeira Liga Team of the Season: 2025–26
