= Lukas Björklund =

Swedish footballer (born 2004)

Personal information
- Full name: Lukas Edvin Björklund
- Date of birth: 16 February 2004 (age 22)
- Place of birth: Ystad, Sweden
- Height: 1.85 m (6 ft 1 in)
- Position: Midfielder

Team information
- Current team: IF Brommapojkarna
- Number: 30

Youth career
- –2018: Ystads IF
- 2018–2020: Malmö FF
- 2020–2022: AC Milan

Senior career*
Years	Team	Apps	(Gls)
2022–2025	Sønderjyske	60	(5)
2025–	Brommapojkarna	18	(2)

International career^{‡}
2019–2020	Sweden U17	6	(0)
2021–2023	Sweden U19	14	(1)
2024–2026	Sweden U21	15	(2)
- * Club domestic league appearances and goals as of 8 July 2026 ‡ National team caps and goals as of 17:59, 4 June 2026 (UTC)

Lukas Edvin Björklund (born 16 February 2004) is a Swedish professional footballer who plays as a midfielder for Allsvenskan club IF Brommapojkarna.

== Career ==
Björklund started his career at Ystads IF, and later in his youth moved to Malmö FF. After two years in Malmö, Björklund moved to Italian giants AC Milan. Björklund never had a big breakthrough in Italy - at least not in the club's first team - and in his two years in Italy, he played for the club's under-18 and under-19 teams.

On 1 September 2022, Danish 1st Division club Sønderjyske confirmed that Björklund joined the club on a deal until June 2025. 18-year-old Björklund had a fine first season at the club, making 24 appearances, scoring three goals and two assists.

However, in May 2023, he suffered a knee injury in training and later underwent surgery that left the Swede out for almost a year. Despite the injury, Björklund extended his contract in December 2023 until June 2026. Björklund was not back on track until April 2024.

On 28 August 2025, Björklund moved back to Sweden to play for Allsvenskan club IF Brommapojkarna.
