= Simen Bolkan Nordli =

Norwegian footballer (born 1999)

Personal information
- Full name: Simen Bolkan Nordli
- Date of birth: 25 December 1999 (age 26)
- Place of birth: Elverum, Norway
- Height: 1.81 m (5 ft 11 in)
- Position: Midfielder

Team information
- Current team: Rosenborg
- Number: 7

Youth career
- Ottestad

Senior career*
Years	Team	Apps	(Gls)
2015	Ottestad	20	(0)
2016–2019	HamKam	82	(24)
2020–2022	Aalesund	87	(17)
2023–2025	Randers	71	(21)
2025–	Rosenborg	27	(6)

International career
2017	Norway U18	2	(2)
2018	Norway U19	8	(1)
2019	Norway U21	2	(0)
- * Club domestic league appearances and goals as of 10 October 2026

Simen Bolkan Nordli (born 25 December 1999) is a Norwegian professional footballer who plays as a midfielder for Eliteserien club Rosenborg.

== Personal life ==
He is a son of former Rosenborg and Hamkam player Leif Nordli, who also coached Ottestad.

== Club career ==
He played youth football for Ottestad before joining larger neighbours HamKam, eventually going on to represent Norway as a youth and U21 international.

On 2 January 2020, Aalesunds FK announced the signing of Nordli on a three-year contract.

Danish club Randers announced on 27 July 2022 that they had signed Nordli on a 3.5 year deal, though he would not join the club officially until January 2023 following the end of the 2022 Eliteserien season. In November 2024, he was named as the Danish Superliga player of the month for October. He was named as the Superliga Player of the Year for the 2024–25 season on 23 May 2025, a year in which he scored 14 goals from 31 matches.

== Career statistics ==
As of match played 10 October 2026

Appearances and goals by club, season and competition
Club	Season	League			National Cup		Continental		Total	
Club	Season	Division	Apps	Goals	Apps	Goals	Apps	Goals	Apps	Goals
HamKam	2016	2. divisjon	12	1	0	0	—		12	1
HamKam	2017	2. divisjon	15	3	0	0	—		15	3
HamKam	2018	1. divisjon	27	7	4	1	—		31	8
HamKam	2019	1. divisjon	28	13	0	0	—		28	13
HamKam	Total		82	24	4	1	0	0	86	25
Aalesunds	2020	Eliteserien	28	4	—		0	0	28	4
Aalesunds	2021	1. divisjon	30	10	3	1	0	0	33	11
Aalesunds	2022	Eliteserien	29	3	3	0	0	0	32	3
Aalesunds	Total		87	17	6	1	0	0	93	18
Randers	2022–23	Danish Superliga	14	2	—		0	0	14	2
Randers	2023–24	Danish Superliga	26	5	2	1	0	0	28	6
Randers	2024–25	Danish Superliga	31	14	1	0	0	0	32	14
Randers	Total		71	21	3	1	0	0	74	22
Rosenborg	2025	Eliteserien	12	2	1	0	6	2	19	4
Rosenborg	2026	Eliteserien	15	4	0	0	—		15	4
Rosenborg	Total		17	6	1	0	6	2	34	8
Career total			267	67	14	3	6	2	286	73

== Honours ==
Individual

- Norwegian First Division Player of the Month: September 2021, October 2021
- Danish Superliga Player of the Month: October 2024
- Danish Superliga Player of the Year: 2024–25
- Danish Superliga Team of the Year: 2024–25
