= Orri Óskarsson =

Icelandic footballer (born 2004)

Personal information
- Full name: Orri Steinn Óskarsson
- Date of birth: 29 August 2004 (age 22)
- Place of birth: Reykjavík, Iceland
- Height: 1.85 m (6 ft 1 in)
- Position: Forward

Team information
- Current team: Real Sociedad
- Number: 9

Youth career
- 2009–2019: Grótta
- 2020–2022: Copenhagen

Senior career*
| Years | Team | Apps | (Gls) |
| 2018–2019 | Grótta | 15 | (4) |
| 2022–2024 | Copenhagen | 37 | (14) |
| 2023 | → Sønderjyske (loan) | 12 | (4) |
| 2024– | Real Sociedad | 54 | (16) |

International career^{‡}
| 2017–2018 | Iceland U15 | 4 | (7) |
| 2019 | Iceland U16 | 6 | (8) |
| 2019–2020 | Iceland U17 | 7 | (1) |
| 2021–2023 | Iceland U19 | 14 | (12) |
| 2021– | Iceland U21 | 6 | (0) |
| 2023– | Iceland | 24 | (13) |
- * Club domestic league appearances and goals as of 17:21, 22 November 2026 (UTC) ‡ National team caps and goals as of 19:10, 16 November 2026 (UTC)

Orri Steinn Óskarsson (born 29 August 2004) is an Icelandic professional footballer who plays as a forward for La Liga side Real Sociedad and captains the Iceland national team.

== Club career ==
=== Grótta ===
Orri Óskarsson came through the academy of Grótta, in his native Iceland. He made his senior debut with the club on 18 August 2018, aged 13 years and 354 days, when he came on as a substitute in the 2018 2. deild match against Höttur, scoring two goals on his debut in a 5–0 victory. In total he played three games and scored three goals in his first season as the club were promoted from the third tier under the management of his father, Óskar Hrafn Þorvaldsson. He played 12 games out of 22 and scored 1 goal in the following season in the second tier, as Grótta were promoted again, this time to the top tier.

=== Copenhagen ===
After the 2019 season, it was announced that Orri would be joining the Danish club Copenhagen in the summer of 2020. He made his professional debut for Copenhagen on the 22 May 2022, during the last game of that season—a 3–0 home league win against Aalborg BK, only few days before he signed a contract extension with the Danish champions.

On 31 January 2023, he joined Danish 1st Division side Sønderjyske on loan for the rest of the season. Upon his return to Copenhagen, he scored a hat-trick in a 6–3 victory over Breiðablik, coached by his father, in the 2023–24 Champions League second qualifying round.

=== Real Sociedad ===
On 30 August 2024, Orri joined Spanish side Real Sociedad for a fee of €20 million, a club record sale from Copenhagen, and signed a six-year deal. He finished his first season with the club making 37 appearances and scoring 7 goals. His second season began with a goal in the 2nd matchday in a 2–2 draw against Espanyol. However, he suffered a long-term hamstring injury on 31 August which kept him out for approximately 12 weeks. On 4 February 2026, he scored the game winner in a 3–2 away victory against Alaves to help his team progress in the Copa del Rey. Three days later, he missed a sitter but then scored in the 3–1 victory against Elche. On April 18, Orri won the Copa del Rey with Real Sociedad.

== International career ==
On 8 September 2023, Orri made his debut for the Iceland senior national team against Luxembourg in the UEFA Euro 2024 qualifying. He scored his first international goal for Iceland on 13 October 2023 against Luxembourg in the same tournament. On 12 March 2025, Orri became captain of the national team.

== Personal life ==
His father is former international footballer and former manager of FK Haugesund, Óskar Hrafn Þorvaldsson. His father managed him while he played with Grótta in both the youth teams and the first team.

His sister Emelia Óskarsdóttir is also a football player, playing for HB Køge.

== Career statistics ==
=== Club ===
As of match played 22 November 2026

Appearances and goals by club, season and competition
| Club | Season | League | | | National cup (Note: Includes Icelandic Cup, Danish Cup, Copa del Rey) | | League cup (Note: Includes Icelandic League Cup) | | Europe | | Other | | Total | |
| Club | Season | Division | Apps | Goals | Apps | Goals | Apps | Goals | Apps | Goals | Apps | Goals | Apps | Goals |
|---|---|---|---|---|---|---|---|---|---|---|---|---|---|---|
| Grótta | 2018 | 2. deild | 3 | 3 | 0 | 0 | — | | — | | — | | 3 | 3 |
| Grótta | 2019 | 1. deild | 12 | 1 | 2 | 0 | 1 | 0 | — | | — | | 15 | 1 |
| Grótta | Total | | 15 | 4 | 2 | 0 | 1 | 0 | — | | — | | 18 | 4 |
| Copenhagen | 2021–22 | Danish Superliga | 1 | 0 | 0 | 0 | — | | 0 | 0 | — | | 1 | 0 |
| Copenhagen | 2022–23 | Danish Superliga | 4 | 0 | 2 | 1 | — | | 2 (Note: Appearances in UEFA Champions League) | 0 | — | | 8 | 1 |
| Copenhagen | 2023–24 | Danish Superliga | 26 | 9 | 3 | 2 | — | | 11 | 3 | 1 (Note: Appearance in Danish Superliga European play-off) | 1 | 41 | 15 |
| Copenhagen | 2024–25 | Danish Superliga | 6 | 5 | — | | — | | 6 (Note: Appearances in UEFA Conference League) | 2 | — | | 12 | 7 |
| Copenhagen | Total | | 37 | 14 | 5 | 3 | — | | 19 | 5 | 1 | 1 | 62 | 23 |
| Sønderjyske (loan) | 2022–23 | Danish 1st Division | 12 | 4 | 2 | 1 | — | | — | | — | | 14 | 5 |
| Real Sociedad | 2024–25 | La Liga | 23 | 3 | 5 | 0 | — | | 9 (Note: Appearances in UEFA Europa League) | 4 | — | | 37 | 7 |
| Real Sociedad | 2025–26 | La Liga | 20 | 9 | 5 | 1 | — | | — | | — | | 25 | 10 |
| Real Sociedad | 2026–27 | La Liga | 11 | 4 | 0 | 0 | — | | 4 | 2 | 0 | 0 | 15 | 6 |
| Real Sociedad | Total | | 54 | 16 | 10 | 1 | — | | 13 | 6 | 0 | 0 | 77 | 23 |
| Career total | | | 119 | 38 | 19 | 5 | 1 | 0 | 32 | 11 | 1 | 1 | 172 | 55 |

=== International ===
As of match played 16 November 2026

Appearances and goals by national team and year
| National team | Year | Apps | Goals |
|---|---|---|---|
| Iceland | 2023 | 6 | 2 |
| Iceland | 2024 | 8 | 3 |
| Iceland | 2025 | 2 | 2 |
| Iceland | 2026 | 8 | 6 |
| Total | | 24 | 13 |

Scores and results list Iceland's goal tally first, score column indicates score after each Orri goal.

List of international goals scored by Orri Óskarsson
| No. | Date | Venue | Cap | Opponent | Score | Result | Competition |
|---|---|---|---|---|---|---|---|
| 1 | 13 October 2023 | Laugardalsvöllur, Reykjavík, Iceland | 3 | Luxembourg | 1–0 | 1–1 | UEFA Euro 2024 qualifying |
| 2 | 16 November 2023 | Tehelné pole, Bratislava, Slovakia | 5 | Slovakia | 1–0 | 2–4 | UEFA Euro 2024 qualifying |
| 3 | 6 September 2024 | Laugardalsvöllur, Reykjavík, Iceland | 9 | Montenegro | 1–0 | 2–0 | 2024–25 UEFA Nations League B |
| 4 | 14 October 2024 | Laugardalsvöllur, Reykjavík, Iceland | 12 | Turkey | 1–0 | 2–4 | 2024–25 UEFA Nations League B |
| 5 | 16 November 2024 | Gradski stadion, Nikšić, Montenegro | 13 | Montenegro | 1–0 | 2–0 | 2024–25 UEFA Nations League B |
| 6 | 20 March 2025 | Fadil Vokrri Stadium, Pristina, Kosovo | 15 | Kosovo | 1–1 | 1–2 | 2024–25 UEFA Nations League promotion/relegation play-offs |
| 7 | 23 March 2025 | Nueva Condomina, Murcia, Spain | 16 | Kosovo | 1–0 | 1–3 | 2024–25 UEFA Nations League promotion/relegation play-offs |
| 8 | 28 March 2026 | BMO Field, Toronto, Canada | 17 | Canada | 1–0 | 2–2 | Friendly |
| 9 | 28 March 2026 | BMO Field, Toronto, Canada | 17 | Canada | 2–0 | 2–2 | Friendly |
| 10 | 29 September 2026 | Stade de Luxembourg, Luxembourg City, Luxembourg | 20 | Luxembourg | 2–0 | 3–0 | 2026–27 UEFA Nations League C |
| 11 | 3 October 2026 | Laugardalsvöllur, Reykjavík, Iceland | 21 | Bulgaria | 1–0 | 3–0 | 2026–27 UEFA Nations League C |
| 12 | 3 October 2026 | Laugardalsvöllur, Reykjavík, Iceland | 21 | Bulgaria | 2–0 | 3–0 | 2026–27 UEFA Nations League C |
| 13 | 13 November 2026 | Hristo Botev Stadium, Plovdiv, Bulgaria | 23 | Bulgaria | 2–0 | 5–0 | 2026–27 UEFA Nations League C |

== Honours ==
Grótta

- 1. deild: 2019

Copenhagen

- Danish Superliga: 2021–22, 2022–23
- Danish Cup: 2022–23

Real Sociedad

- Copa del Rey: 2025–26

Individual

- Icelandic Footballer of the Year: 2024
- Danish Superliga Young Player of the Month: July 2024, August 2024
