= Mathias Kvistgaarden =

Danish footballer (born 2002)

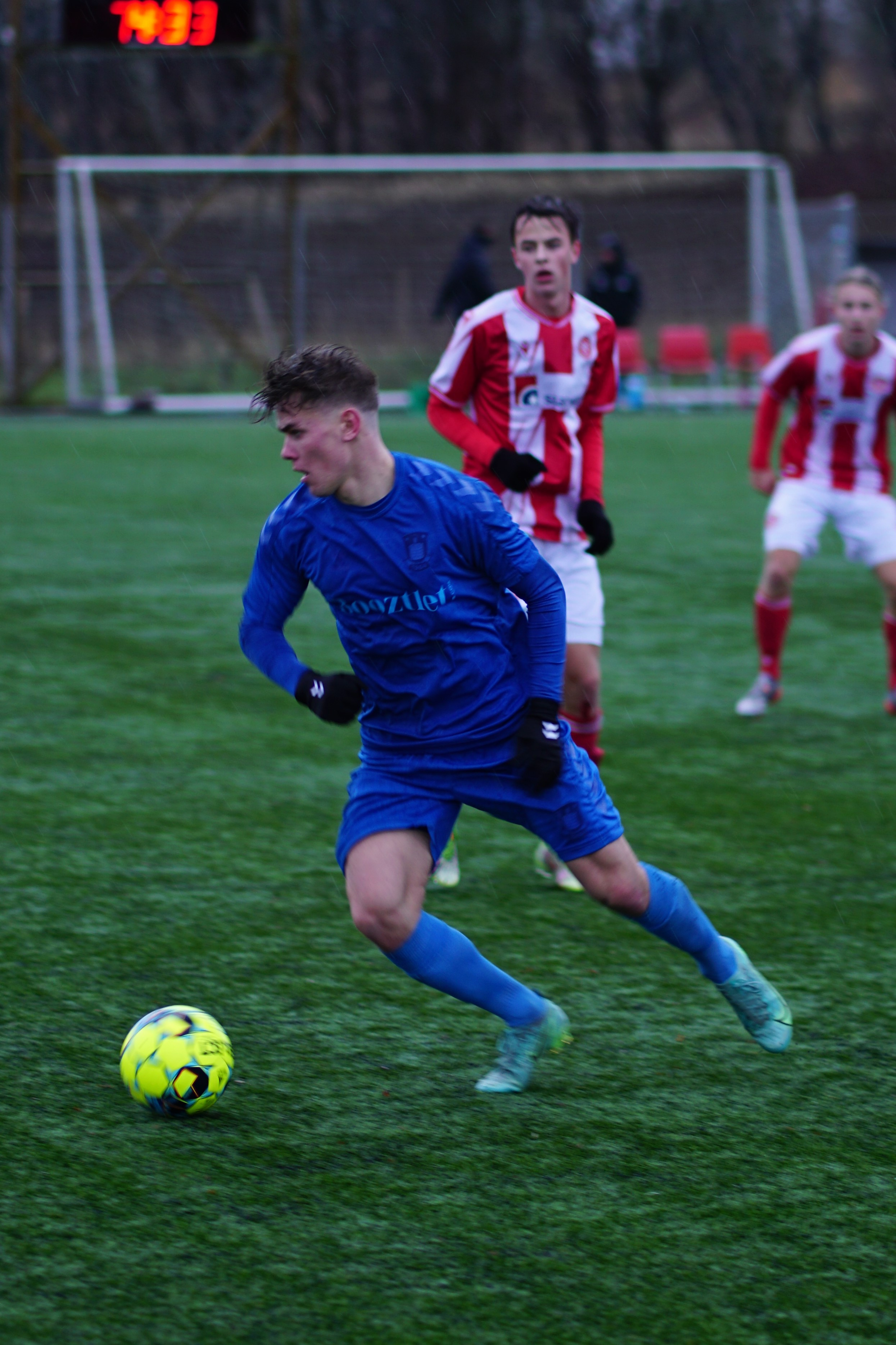
- Kvistgaarden in 2021

Personal information
- Full name: Mathias Damm Kvistgaarden
- Date of birth: 15 April 2002 (age 24)
- Place of birth: Birkerød, Denmark
- Height: 1.73 m (5 ft 8 in)
- Position: Forward

Team information
- Current team: Norwich City
- Number: 30

Youth career
- 2008–2013: Skjold Birkerød
- 2013–2015: Lyngby
- 2015–2020: Brøndby

Senior career*
| Years | Team | Apps | (Gls) |
| 2020–2025 | Brøndby | 102 | (37) |
| 2025– | Norwich City | 48 | (10) |

International career^{‡}
| 2019–2020 | Denmark U18 | 6 | (3) |
| 2020 | Denmark U19 | 1 | (1) |
| 2022 | Denmark U20 | 2 | (1) |
| 2022–2024 | Denmark U21 | 21 | (7) |
| 2025– | Denmark | 2 | (0) |
- * Club domestic league appearances and goals as of 14:53, 7 November 2026 (UTC) ‡ National team caps and goals as of 18:40, 5 October 2026 (UTC)

Mathias Damm Kvistgaarden (Danish pronunciation: [ˈkʰve̝stˌkɒˀn̩]; born 15 April 2002) is a Danish professional footballer who plays as a forward for EFL Championship club Norwich City and the Denmark national team.

== Club career ==
=== Brøndby ===
==== Youth ====
Kvistgaarden was born in Birkerød and began playing at his hometown club IF Skjold Birkerød. He joined the Lyngby Boldklub academy in 2013 and moved to Brøndby IF at under-13 level two years later, a move he attributed in part to his family's relationship with the Brøndby head coach, Thomas Frank. He found the Brøndby youth set-up considerably more competitive than those he had known at Skjold and Lyngby. Promoted to the under-19 team in the summer of 2019, he scored nine goals in 14 league matches at that level.

==== Senior ====
On 5 July 2020, Kvistgaarden was included in the senior squad for the first time ahead of an away Danish Superliga match against AaB, the regular strikers Simon Hedlund and Samuel Mráz having tested positive for COVID-19. He made his debut in that match, a 2–0 defeat, replacing Mikael Uhre after 73 minutes.

Kvistgaarden scored his first goal for Brøndby on 6 March 2022, the winner in a 1–0 away victory over Silkeborg, and made his first start on 14 April. He signed a contract extension to 2025 at the end of that month, and scored four goals in three league matches in May, including his first brace on the final day against Silkeborg. He had been named the Superliga's Young Player of the Month for May shortly before that match.

He extended his contract again on 26 May 2023, to 2027, and scored his first senior hat-trick three days later in a 5–1 win over Nordsjælland.

The 2024–25 season was the most productive of his career. He scored 17 league goals, finishing as the Superliga's leading scorer in the championship round, and 23 in 38 matches in all competitions as Brøndby finished third, and his fellow professionals voted him the division's player of the year. He left the club having scored 47 goals in 126 appearances.

=== Norwich City ===
Kvistgaarden signed for EFL Championship club Norwich City on 8 July 2025 on an initial four-year deal, for a fee of £6.9 million. He scored his first goal for the club on 13 September in a 1–1 draw at Coventry City. He finished his first season in England with six goals in 36 league appearances, most of them from the bench, having started only twelve matches; local reporting noted that his six goals came from an expected goals figure of 5.14 and that he had led the division's forwards for goals per 90 minutes for much of the campaign.

== International career ==
Kvistgaarden has earned six appearances for Denmark at under-18 level, in which he has scored three goals. On 8 October 2020, he made his debut with a goal for the Denmark under-19 team in a 3–1 friendly victory against Poland.

On 4 June 2022, Kvistgaarden debuted for the Denmark under-21 in a 2023 UEFA European Under-21 Championship qualification against Kazakhstan. He started with 63 minutes on the pitch before being replaced by Rasmus Højlund in a 3–0 victory at Vejle Stadium. He scored his first goal for the under-21 team ten days later against Turkey, poking in the ball at the far post after an assist by Gustav Isaksen.

Kvistgaarden made his debut for the Denmark national team in a 2–1 friendly victory against Northern Ireland, coming on as a substitute in the 65th minute to Mikkel Damsgaard.

== Career statistics ==
=== Club ===
As of match played 7 November

Appearances and goals by club, season and competition
| Club | Season | League | | | National cup (Note: Includes Danish Cup, FA Cup) | | League cup (Note: Includes EFL Cup) | | Europe | | Total | |
| Club | Season | Division | Apps | Goals | Apps | Goals | Apps | Goals | Apps | Goals | Apps | Goals |
|---|---|---|---|---|---|---|---|---|---|---|---|---|
| Brøndby | 2019–20 | Danish Superliga | 1 | 0 | — | | — | | — | | 1 | 0 |
| Brøndby | 2020–21 | Danish Superliga | 2 | 0 | 2 | 0 | — | | — | | 4 | 0 |
| Brøndby | 2021–22 | Danish Superliga | 16 | 5 | 2 | 0 | — | | 1 (Note: Appearances in UEFA Europa League) | 0 | 19 | 5 |
| Brøndby | 2022–23 | Danish Superliga | 30 | 7 | 1 | 0 | — | | 4 (Note: Appearances in UEFA Europa Conference League) | 2 | 35 | 9 |
| Brøndby | 2023–24 | Danish Superliga | 24 | 8 | 4 | 2 | — | | — | | 28 | 10 |
| Brøndby | 2024–25 | Danish Superliga | 29 | 17 | 6 | 4 | — | | 3 (Note: Appearances in UEFA Conference League) | 2 | 38 | 23 |
| Brøndby | Total | | 102 | 37 | 15 | 6 | — | | 8 | 4 | 125 | 47 |
| Norwich City | 2025–26 | EFL Championship | 36 | 6 | 3 | 0 | 1 | 0 | — | | 40 | 6 |
| Norwich City | 2026–27 | EFL Championship | 12 | 4 | 0 | 0 | 3 | 1 | — | | 15 | 5 |
| Norwich City | Total | | 48 | 10 | 3 | 0 | 4 | 1 | — | | 55 | 11 |
| Career total | | | 150 | 47 | 18 | 6 | 4 | 1 | 8 | 4 | 180 | 58 |

=== International ===
As of match played 4 October 2026

Appearances and goals by national team and year
| National team | Year | Apps | Goals |
|---|---|---|---|
| Denmark | 2025 | 1 | 0 |
| Denmark | 2026 | 1 | 0 |
| Total | | 2 | 0 |

== Honours ==
Brøndby

- Danish Superliga: 2020–21

Individual

- Danish Superliga Player of the Year: 2024–25
- Danish Superliga Team of the Year: 2024–25
- Danish Superliga Player of the Month: April 2025
