= Steffen Kielstrup =

Danish footballer and coach

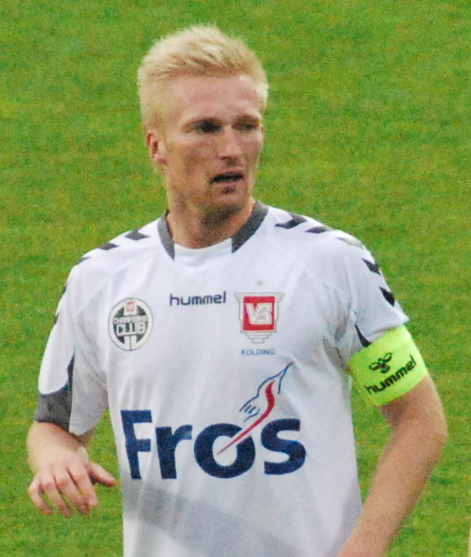
- Kielstrup in September 2011

Personal information
- Date of birth: 18 October 1984 (age 42)
- Place of birth: Denmark
- Height: 1.81 m (5 ft 11 1/2 in)
- Positions: Defender; midfielder

Team information
- Current team: Vejle (caretaker)

Youth career
- 1988–1990: Boldklubben Sport Grejsdalen
- 1990–2001: Vejle

Senior career*
Years	Team	Apps	(Gls)
2001–2012	Vejle	213	(17)
2012–2015	AC Horsens	76	(3)
2015–2017	Vejle	36	(1)
Total		325	(21)

International career
2000–2001	Denmark U-17	6	(0)
2002	Denmark U-18	1	(0)
2001–2003	Denmark U-19	5	(0)
2003–2004	Denmark U-20	7	(0)
2004–2006	Denmark U-21	5	(0)

Managerial career
- 2017–2018: Vejle (U17)
- 2018–2021: Vejle (U19)
- 2025: Vejle
- 2025–: Vejle (caretaker)
- * Club domestic league appearances and goals

Steffen Kielstrup (born 18 October 1984) is a Danish coach and retired professional football player. He is currently the assistant coach of Vejle Boldklub.

Kielstrup has played in Vejle since the age of six but is due to move to Horsens in the summer of 2012 after having signed a 3-year contract.

== Playing career ==
Already at the age of six Steffen Kielstrup joined Vejle Boldklub and played all his youth years in the club. He made his debut on the first team on 6 May 2001 only 16 years old. At that time he had played six matches on the Denmark national under-17 football team, and was considered a talent with a great future ahead as a footballer. Since then Kielstrup has represented the Denmark national youth teams every year, playing 18 matches, and is still representing Vejle Boldklub on the club side.

In his time in Vejle Boldklub he has been used as an allround player, playing all positions in the defense and as a central midfielder. Especially in the season of 07/08 where he and Vejle Boldklub secured promotion to the best Danish league, for the third time in his professional career, Kielstrup did not have a regular role on the team. Even though he played nearly every game and the club secured a record breaking 78 points out of 90, he was not satisfied with his role.

== Coaching career ==
=== Vejle Boldklub ===
After Kielstrup retired in the summer 2017 due to injuries, he was appointed as the new U17 coach. One year later, he took charge of the U19s.

Kielstrup was U19 manager until June 2021, where he was promoted as an assistant coach for the first team under manager Carit Falch.

Following the sacking of Mihai Teja on 9 February 2025, Kielstrup was made new joint manager of Vejle Boldklub along Johnny Mølby. In June 2025, he returned to his former position as assistant manager.
