= 2024–25 Danish Superliga =

35th season of Danish Superliga

Superliga
- Season: 2024–25
- Dates: 19 July 2024 – 25 May 2025
- Champions: Copenhagen
- Relegated: Lyngby; AaB
- Champions League: Copenhagen
- Europa League: Midtjylland
- Conference League: Brøndby; Silkeborg
- Matches: 193
- Goals: 606 (3.14 per match)
- Top goalscorer: Patrick Mortensen; (20 goals)
- Best goalkeeper: Patrick Pentz; (8 clean sheets)
- Biggest home win: Midtjylland 5–0 Nordsjælland; (27 April 2025)
- Biggest away win: Vejle 0–5 Viborg; (15 September 2024)
- Highest scoring: Nordsjælland 5–2 Randers; (13 April 2025); Brøndby 4–3 Randers; (21 April 2025)
- Longest winning run: 6 matches; Midtjylland
- Longest unbeaten run: 13 matches; Copenhagen
- Longest winless run: 13 matches; Lyngby
- Longest losing run: 10 matches; Vejle
- Highest attendance: 35,972; Copenhagen 3–0 Nordsjælland; (25 May 2025)
- Lowest attendance: 3,027; Randers 1–3 Silkeborg; (1 June 2025)
- Total attendance: 1,929,979
- Average attendance: 9,999

The 2024–25 Danish Superliga (officially the 3F Superliga for sponsorship purposes) was the 35th season of the Danish Superliga. Midtjylland entered the season as the defending champions, having secured the 2023–24 title on the final day. However, Midtjylland were unable to defend their title as they finished the season in second place, one point behind champions Copenhagen.

The schedule for the first seven matchdays was released on 7 June 2024, with the opening fixture set for 19 July between AGF and Midtjylland. Following the 17th round of fixtures, between 2 December and 14 February, the league entered a winter break in which no league fixtures were played.

== Teams ==
Sønderjyske won the 2023–24 Danish 1st Division returning to the Superliga after a two-year stint at the lower division, and AaB made an immediate return to the top flight by finishing second in the 1st Division. Those two teams replaced OB and Hvidovre, making it the first time since the 1999–2000 season that OB would not play in the top tier division.

=== Stadiums and locations ===
Locations of the Danish Superliga 2024–25 teams

Club	Location	Stadium	Turf	Capacity	2023–24 position
AaB	Aalborg	Aalborg Portland Park	Natural	13,997	1D, 2nd
AGF	Aarhus	Ceres Park (2024); Ceres Park Vejlby (2025)	Hybrid; Hybrid	19,433; 12,000	5th
Brøndby	Brøndby	Brøndby Stadium	Hybrid	28,000	2nd
Copenhagen	Copenhagen	Parken	Hybrid	38,009	3rd
Lyngby	Kongens Lyngby	Lyngby Stadium	Natural	10,100	10th
Midtjylland	Herning	MCH Arena	Natural	11,809	1st
Nordsjælland	Farum	Right to Dream Park	Artificial	9,900	4th
Randers	Randers	Cepheus Park Randers	Natural	11,801	7th
Silkeborg	Silkeborg	JYSK Park	Artificial	10,000	6th
Sønderjyske	Haderslev	Sydbank Park	Natural	10,100	1D, 1st
Vejle	Vejle	Vejle Stadion	Natural	11,060	9th
Viborg	Viborg	Energi Viborg Arena	Hybrid	10,000	8th

=== Personnel and sponsoring ===
Note: Flags indicate national team as has been defined under FIFA eligibility rules. Players and Managers may hold more than one non-FIFA nationality.

Team	Head coach	Captain	Kit manufacturer	Shirt sponsor (front)	Shirt sponsor (back)	Shirt sponsor (sleeve)	Shorts sponsor
AaB	(Denmark) Kristoffer Wichmann	(Denmark) Rasmus Thelander	Macron	Arbejdernes Landsbank	Scan Global Logistics	None	None
AGF	(Germany) Uwe Rösler	(Denmark) Patrick Mortensen	Craft	Ceres (H)/Bravida (A & T), Arbejdernes Landsbank (H)	Arbejdernes Landsbank (A & T)	Mybanker	Bravida (H)/Faxe Kondi (A & T)
Brøndby	(Denmark) Frederik Birk	(Denmark) Kevin Mensah	Hummel	None	NTG Nordic Transport	Boozt	None
Copenhagen	(Denmark) Jacob Neestrup	(Sweden) Viktor Claesson	Adidas	Unibet	Carlsberg	Carlsberg	Unibet
Lyngby	(Denmark) Morten Karlsen	(Denmark) Marcel Rømer	Select	Carl Ras, Airtox	Airtox	V8 Construction	Johannes Fog
Midtjylland	(Denmark) Thomas Thomasberg	(Denmark) Mads Bech Sørensen	Puma	Vestjysk Bank (H)/Arbejdernes Landsbank (A & T), Jack & Jones	Ejner Hessel	AL Finans	Arbejdernes Landsbank
Nordsjælland	(Denmark) Jens Olsen	(Denmark) Kian Hansen	Nike	DHL	Arbejdernes Landsbank	Arbejdernes Landsbank	Faxe Kondi
Randers	(Denmark) Rasmus Bertelsen	(Germany) Björn Kopplin	Puma	Verdo, Sparekassen Kronjylland	Jysk Vin (H)/Gardin Lis (A)	ACTEC Batterier	Klodskassen
Silkeborg	(Denmark) Kent Nielsen	(Denmark) Nicolai Larsen	Adidas	JYSK, Lars Larsen Group	Various	SPORT 24 A/S	None
Sønderjyske	(Denmark) Thomas Nørgaard	(Denmark) Rasmus Vinderslev	Hummel	Sydjysk Sparekasse, Davidsen	P. Christensen	SPORT 24 A/S	Dansk Fliserens
Vejle	(Denmark) Steffen Kielstrup (Denmark) Johnny Mølby	(Denmark) Oliver Provstgaard	Adidas	Arbejdernes Landsbank/Vestjysk Bank	5E Byg (H)/StockGroup A/S (A)	SPORT 24 A/S	Various
Viborg	(Denmark) Jakob Poulsen	(Denmark) Jeppe Grønning	Capelli Sport	Peter Larsen Kaffe	Kærsgaard A/S	None	Vexa Ejendomskreditselskab

=== Managerial changes ===
Team	Outgoing manager	Manner of departure	Date of vacancy	Position in table	Replaced by	Date of appointment
FC Nordsjælland	(Denmark) Johannes Hoff Thorup	Signed by Norwich City	30 May 2024	Pre-Season	(Denmark) Jens Olsen	24 June 2024
Lyngby Boldklub	(Denmark) David Nielsen	End of contract	30 June 2024	Pre-Season	(Denmark) Morten Karlsen	1 July 2024
Vejle Boldklub	(Croatia) Ivan Prelec	Resigned	23 September 2024	12th	(Romania) Mihai Teja	24 September 2024
Brøndby IF	(Denmark) Jesper Sørensen	Sacked	11 December 2024	5th	(Denmark) Frederik Birk	8 January 2025
Vejle Boldklub	(Romania) Mihai Teja	Sacked	9 February 2025	12th	(Denmark) Steffen Kielstrup (Denmark) Johnny Mølby	9 February 2025
AaB	(Netherlands) Menno van Dam	Sacked	20 April 2025	10th	(Denmark) Kristoffer Wichmann	23 April 2025

== Regular season ==
=== League table ===
Pos	Team	Pld	W	D	L	GF	GA	GD	Pts	Qualification
1	Midtjylland	22	14	3	5	42	27	+15	45	Qualification for the Championship round
2	Copenhagen	22	11	8	3	38	24	+14	41	Qualification for the Championship round
3	AGF	22	9	9	4	42	23	+19	36	Qualification for the Championship round
4	Randers	22	9	8	5	39	28	+11	35	Qualification for the Championship round
5	Nordsjælland	22	10	5	7	39	36	+3	35	Qualification for the Championship round
6	Brøndby	22	8	9	5	42	32	+10	33	Qualification for the Championship round
7	Silkeborg	22	8	9	5	38	29	+9	33	Qualification for the Relegation round
8	Viborg	22	7	7	8	38	39	−1	28	Qualification for the Relegation round
9	AaB	22	5	6	11	23	41	−18	21	Qualification for the Relegation round
10	Lyngby	22	3	9	10	15	26	−11	18	Qualification for the Relegation round
11	Sønderjyske	22	4	5	13	26	51	−25	17	Qualification for the Relegation round
12	Vejle	22	3	4	15	24	50	−26	13	Qualification for the Relegation round

Source: Danish Football Association (in Danish), Soccerway
Rules for classification: 1) Points; 2) Goal difference; 3) Goals scored; 4) Away goals scored; 5) Play-off (played on neutral ground if determining teams for different rounds); 6) Draw.

=== Results ===
Home \ Away	AAB	AGF	BRO	COP	LYN	MID	NOR	RAN	SIL	SON	VEJ	VIB
AaB		0–4	0–4	0–0	2–1	1–4	1–2	0–2	2–1	3–0	3–3	0–0
AGF	4–0		1–0	1–1	2–1	1–1	4–2	2–2	1–1	4–0	5–1	1–1
Brøndby	1–0	0–1		0–0	1–1	2–0	1–1	2–2	2–2	2–0	2–1	4–1
Copenhagen	2–0	3–2	3–1		2–1	1–0	3–1	1–1	2–2	1–1	3–1	1–1
Lyngby	2–2	0–0	0–2	0–2		1–2	1–0	0–0	2–2	0–2	1–0	0–0
Midtjylland	2–0	2–0	1–5	2–1	1–0		2–1	4–2	1–0	3–2	2–0	3–1
Nordsjælland	3–0	1–0	4–1	3–2	1–1	2–2		1–1	1–1	3–2	3–1	2–1
Randers	1–0	1–1	4–2	1–2	1–1	2–2	4–0		0–2	1–2	2–0	3–1
Silkeborg	1–1	1–1	3–3	2–2	0–1	1–3	4–1	1–0		1–0	0–1	3–3
Sønderjyske	0–3	1–4	2–2	0–2	1–1	3–2	1–4	1–4	1–3		2–1	3–3
Vejle	2–2	3–2	2–2	1–2	2–0	0–3	0–1	2–3	1–3	1–1		0–5
Viborg	2–3	1–1	3–3	3–2	1–0	1–0	3–2	1–2	1–4	4–2	3–1	

Source: Soccerway
Legend: Blue = home team win; Yellow = draw; Red = away team win.

== Championship round ==
Points and goals carried over in full from the regular season.

Pos	Team	Pld	W	D	L	GF	GA	GD	Pts	
1	Copenhagen (C)	32	18	9	5	60	33	+27	63	Qualification for the UEFA Champions League second qualifying round
2	Midtjylland	32	19	5	8	64	42	+22	62	Qualification for the UEFA Europa League second qualifying round
3	Brøndby	32	13	12	7	58	46	+12	51	Qualification for the UEFA Conference League second qualifying round
4	Randers	32	13	9	10	57	50	+7	48	Qualification for the European play-off match
5	Nordsjælland	32	13	7	12	53	56	−3	46	
6	AGF	32	10	10	12	53	46	+7	40	

Source: Danish Football Association (in Danish), Soccerway
Rules for classification: 1) Points; 2) Goal difference; 3) Goals scored; 4) Away goals scored; 5) Play-off (played on neutral ground if determining teams for different rounds); 6) Draw.
(C) Champions

=== Results ===
Home \ Away	AGF	BRO	COP	MID	NOR	RAN
AGF		2–3	1–3	1–1	2–0	1–3
Brøndby	2–1		0–3	1–2	0–0	4–3
Copenhagen	3–1	1–2		1–1	3–0	1–0
Midtjylland	3–1	0–2	4–2		5–0	3–2
Nordsjælland	2–0	2–2	0–1	3–2		5–2
Randers	3–1	0–0	0–4	2–1	3–2	

Source: Danish Football Association (in Danish)
Legend: Blue = home team win; Yellow = draw; Red = away team win.

== Relegation round ==
Points and goals carried over in full from the regular season.

Pos	Team	Pld	W	D	L	GF	GA	GD	Pts	
1	Silkeborg (O)	32	13	10	9	56	41	+15	49	Qualification for the European play-off match
2	Viborg	32	12	11	9	57	50	+7	47	
3	Sønderjyske	32	10	7	15	47	64	−17	37	
4	Vejle	32	7	7	18	37	64	−27	28	
5	Lyngby (R)	32	5	12	15	26	43	−17	27	Relegation to 1st Division
6	AaB (R)	32	5	9	18	34	67	−33	24	Relegation to 1st Division

Source: Danish Football Association (in Danish), Soccerway
Rules for classification: 1) Points; 2) Goal difference; 3) Goals scored; 4) Away goals scored; 5) Play-off (played on neutral ground if determining teams for different rounds); 6) Draw.
(O) Play-off winners; (R) Relegated

=== Results ===
Home \ Away	AAB	LYN	SIL	SON	VEJ	VIB
AaB		2–2	2–3	2–3	0–1	0–4
Lyngby	3–1		2–0	0–2	1–2	0–0
Silkeborg	4–0	2–1		1–0	1–1	1–2
Sønderjyske	2–2	5–1	2–1		1–0	2–2
Vejle	1–1	2–0	0–4	2–3		3–3
Viborg	3–1	1–1	2–1	2–1	0–1	

Source: Danish Football Association (in Danish)
Legend: Blue = home team win; Yellow = draw; Red = away team win.

== European play-offs ==
The 3rd-placed team of the championship round advances to a play-off match against the winning team of the qualification round (no. 7) in a single-leg tie, with the team from the championship round as hosts. The winner earns a place in the Conference League second qualifying round.

=== European play-off match ===
1 June 2025
18:30 CEST (UTC+2)

Randers	1–3	Silkeborg
Mahmoud 39'	Report	Mattsson 8'; McCowatt 26'; Andersen 71'

Ceres Park Vejlby, Aarhus
Attendance: 3,027
Referee: Jakob Sundberg

== Season statistics ==
As of 1 June 2025

=== Top scorers ===
Rank	Player	Club	Goals
1	(Denmark) Patrick Mortensen	AGF	20
2	(Denmark) Mathias Kvistgaarden	Brøndby	17
3	(Denmark) Tonni Adamsen	Silkeborg	15
3	(Sweden) Benjamin Nygren	Nordsjælland	15
5	(Norway) Simen Nordli	Randers	14
6	(Russia) German Onugkha	Vejle	13
7	(Poland) Adam Buksa	Midtjylland	12
7	(Japan) Yuito Suzuki	Brøndby	12
9	(Guinea-Bissau) Franculino Djú	Midtjylland	11
9	(North Macedonia) Lirim Qamili	Sønderjyske	11

==== Hat-tricks ====
Player	For	Against	Result	Date
(Denmark) Mathias Jørgensen	AaB	Sønderjyske	3–0 (H)	29 September 2024
(Denmark) Mathias Kvistgaarden	Brøndby	Midtjylland	5–1 (A)	3 November 2024
(Denmark) Patrick Mortensen	AGF	Sønderjyske	4–1 (A)	16 February 2025
(Sweden) Benjamin Nygren	Nordsjælland	Randers	5–2 (H)	13 April 2025
(Guinea-Bissau) Franculino Djú	Midtjylland	Nordsjælland	5–0 (H)	27 April 2025

=== Clean sheets ===
Rank	Player	Club	Clean sheets
1	(Austria) Patrick Pentz	Brøndby	8
2	(Denmark) Jesper Hansen	AGF	7
2	(Germany) Diant Ramaj	Copenhagen	7
4	(Australia) Paul Izzo	Randers	6
4	(Denmark) Nicolai Larsen	Silkeborg	6
6	(Denmark) Andreas Hansen	Nordsjælland	5
6	(Iceland) Elías Ólafsson	Midtjylland	5
6	(Denmark) Oscar Hedvall	Viborg	5
6	(Slovenia) Igor Vekić	Vejle	5
10	(Germany) Vincent Müller	AaB	4
10	(Denmark) Jannich Storch	Lyngby	4
10	(England) Nathan Trott	Copenhagen	4

=== Discipline ===
==== Player ====
- Most yellow cards: 10
  - (Denmark) Jeppe Grønning (Viborg)
- Most red cards: 2
  - (Senegal) Ousmane Diao (Midtjylland)

==== Club ====
- Most yellow cards: 69
  - Lyngby
- Fewest yellow cards: 41
  - Silkeborg
- Most red cards: 5
  - Brøndby
- Fewest red cards: 0
  - Vejle

=== Attendance ===
Rank	Club	Average
1	Copenhagen	28,205
2	Brøndby	21,659
3	AGF	10,880
4	Midtjylland	10,042
5	AaB	8,194
6	Vejle	7,580
7	Randers	6,583
8	Viborg	6,457
9	Sønderjyske	5,477
10	Lyngby	5,342
11	Silkeborg	5,156
12	Nordsjælland	4,916

== Awards ==
=== Monthly awards ===
Month	Player of the Month		Young Player of the Month		Goal of the Month	
Month	Player	Club	Player	Club	Player	Club
July	(Denmark) Mads Emil Madsen	AGF	(Iceland) Orri Óskarsson	Copenhagen	(Denmark) Mads Enggård	Randers
August	(Denmark) Tonni Adamsen	Silkeborg	(Iceland) Orri Óskarsson	Copenhagen	(Denmark) Marcus Ingvartsen	Nordsjælland
September	(Denmark) Tonni Adamsen	Silkeborg	(Guinea-Bissau) Franculino Djú	Midtjylland	(Turkey) Aral Şimşir	Midtjylland
October	(Norway) Simen Nordli	Randers	(Denmark) Clement Bischoff	Brøndby	(Norway) Simen Nordli	Randers
November	(Denmark) André Rømer	Randers	(Australia) Mohamed Toure	Randers	(Denmark) Peter Ankersen	Nordsjælland
February	(Denmark) Patrick Mortensen	AGF	(Denmark) Victor Froholdt	Copenhagen	(Denmark) Mathias Kvistgaarden	Brøndby
March	(Russia) German Onugkha	Vejle	(Denmark) Victor Froholdt	Copenhagen	(Chile) Darío Osorio	Midtjylland
April	(Denmark) Mathias Kvistgaarden	Brøndby	(Denmark) Mikel Gogorza	Midtjylland	(Denmark) Isak Jensen	Viborg
May	(Sweden) Jordan Larsson	Copenhagen	(Denmark) Victor Froholdt	Copenhagen	(Sweden) Jordan Larsson	Copenhagen

=== Annual awards ===
On 23 May 2025, the Superliga announced the Player of the Year award, as well as Young Player of the Year. This was followed by the Team of the Year announcement on 1 June, and Goal of the Year awarded on 3 June.

Award	Player	Club
Player of the Year	(Norway) Simen Nordli	Randers
Young Player of the Year	(Denmark) Victor Froholdt	Copenhagen
Goal of the Year	(Chile) Darío Osorio	Midtjylland

Team of the Year
Pos.	Player	Club
GK	(Denmark) Nicolai Larsen	Silkeborg
DF	(Denmark) Frederik Tingager	AGF
DF	(Brazil) Gabriel Pereira	Copenhagen
DF	(Denmark) Daniel Høegh	Randers
MF	(Norway) Simen Nordli	Randers
MF	(Denmark) Victor Froholdt	Copenhagen
MF	(Denmark) Oliver Sørensen	Midtjylland
MF	(Cape Verde) Serginho	Viborg
FW	(Sweden) Benjamin Nygren	Nordsjælland
FW	(Denmark) Patrick Mortensen	AGF
FW	(Denmark) Mathias Kvistgaarden	Brøndby

== See also ==
- 2024–25 Danish 1st Division
- 2024–25 Danish 2nd Division
- 2024–25 Danish 3rd Division
- 2024–25 Denmark Series
- 2024–25 Danish Cup
