= 2026–27 F.C. Copenhagen season =

F.C. Copenhagen
2026–27 season
- Chairman: Henrik Møgelmose
- Head coach: Bo Svensson
- Stadium: Parken
- Danish Superliga: First
- Danish Cup: Quarterfinals
- UEFA Conference League: League Stage
- Top goalscorer: League: Mohamed Elyounoussi (7); All: Mohamed Elyounoussi (12)
- Highest home attendance: 34,348 (8 November 2026 vs. Brøndby)
- Lowest home attendance: 18,660 (5 November 2026 vs. Iberia 1999
- Average home league attendance: 25,481
- Biggest win: 4–0 (16 August 2026 vs Randers)
- Biggest defeat: 0–5 (22 November 2026 vs Nordsjælland)
Home colours	Away colours	Third colours
- All statistics correct as of 22 November 2026.

The 2026–27 F.C. Copenhagen season is the club's 35th season in existence, all of which were competed in the top flight of Danish football.

After a first half struggle in the 2025–26 Danish Superliga that saw the Lions sent to the Relegation Group for the 2nd half of the season, the squad rallied to qualify and win the European Playoff game and qualify for the 2026–27 UEFA Conference League. The team will also look to improve on its runner-up finish in the 2026–27 Danish Cup. The season covers the period from 1 July 2026 to 30 June 2027.

== Players ==
=== Current squad ===
As of 11 September 2026

No.	Player	Nationality	Position	Since	Date of birth	Signed from
Goalkeepers
31	Rúnar Alex Rúnarsson	(Iceland)	GK	2024	18 February 1995	(England) Arsenal
41	Diant Ramaj	(Germany) (Kosovo)	GK	2026	19 September 2001	(Germany) Borussia Dortmund
51	Tobias Breum-Harild	(Denmark)	GK	2026	25 October 2007	(Denmark) Homegrown
Defenders
2	Felix Beijmo	(Sweden)	CB	2026	31 January 1998	(Denmark) AGF
4	Asger Sørensen	(Denmark)	CB	2026	5 June 1996	(Czech Republic) Sparta Prague
6	Ákos Markgráf	(Hungary)	CB	2026	30 June 2005	(Hungary) Újpest
13	Rodrigo Huescas	(Mexico)	RB	2024	18 September 2003	(Mexico) Cruz Azul
15	Marcos López	(Peru)	LB	2024	20 November 1999	(Netherlands) Feyenoord
18	Kenay Myrie	(Costa Rica)	RB	2026	6 September 2006	(Costa Rica) Deportivo Saprissa
20	Junnosuke Suzuki	(Japan)	CB	2025	12 July 2003	(Japan) Shonan Bellmare
24	Birger Meling	(Norway)	LB	2023	17 December 1994	(France) Rennes
Midfielders
8	Magnus Mattsson	(Denmark)	CM	2024	25 February 1999	(Netherlands) NEC Nijmegen
21	Mads Emil Madsen	(Denmark)	CM	2025	14 January 1998	(Denmark) AGF
27	Thomas Delaney	(Denmark)	CM	2024	3 September 1991	(Spain) Sevilla
28	Hunor Németh	(Hungary) (Denmark)	CM	2026	16 March 2007	(Denmark) Homegrown
33	Alex Král	(Czech Republic)	CM	2026	19 May 1998	(Germany) Union Berlin
36	William Clem	(Denmark)	CDM	2023	20 June 2004	(Denmark) Homegrown
Forwards
7	Maher Carrizo	(Argentina)	RW	2026	19 February 2006	(Netherlands) Ajax
10	Mohamed Elyounoussi	(Norway)	SS	2023	4 August 1994	(England) Southampton
12	Thapelo Maseko	(South Africa)	RW	2026	11 November 2003	(South Africa) Mamelodi Sundowns
14	Andreas Cornelius	(Denmark)	CF	2022	16 March 1993	(Turkey) Trabzonspor
16	Robert	(Brazil)	LW	2024	13 April 2005	(Brazil) Cruzeiro
39	Viktor Daðason	(Iceland)	CF	2025	30 June 2008	(Denmark) Homegrown
44	Geovanni Vianney Ndjee	(Cameroon)	CF	2026	25 September 2007	(Denmark) Homegrown

=== Youth players in use ===
Note: Flags indicate national team as defined under FIFA eligibility rules; some limited exceptions apply. Players may hold more than one non-FIFA nationality.

No.	Pos.	Nation	Player
34	MF	DEN	Marvin Nasnas
40	DF	NOR	Henrik Haraldsen

No.	Pos.	Nation	Player
45	MF	ISL	Gunnar Orri Olsen

=== Out on loan ===
Note: Flags indicate national team as defined under FIFA eligibility rules; some limited exceptions apply. Players may hold more than one non-FIFA nationality.

No.	Pos.	Nation	Player
5	DF	BRA	Gabriel Pereira (at Vasco da Gama until 30 June 2027)
9	FW	GER	Youssoufa Moukoko (at Çorum until 30 June 2027)
23	MF	POL	Dominik Sarapata (at Artis Brno until 30 June 2027)
29	MF	DEN	Jonathan Moalem (at Strømsgodset until 30 June 2027)

No.	Pos.	Nation	Player
38	MF	DEN	Oliver Højer (at Lyngby until 30 June 2027)
61	GK	DEN	Oscar Buur (at Hødd until 31 December 2026)
—	GK	CRO	Dominik Kotarski (at Dinamo Zagreb until 30 June 2027)
—	DF	ZIM	Munashe Garananga (at Lyngby until 30 June 2027)

== Transfers ==
=== In ===
Date	Pos.	Nat.	Name	Club	Fee	Ref.
1 July 2026	CB	(Sweden)	Felix Beijmo	(Denmark) AGF	Free Transfer	
16 July 2026	CM	(Czech Republic)	Alex Král	(Germany) Union Berlin	Free Transfer	
4 August 2026	CB	(Hungary)	Ákos Markgráf	(Hungary) Újpest	€1.50m	
18 August 2026	RW	(South Africa)	Thapelo Maseko	(South Africa) Mamelodi Sundowns	€1.50m	
22 August 2026	CB	(Denmark)	Asger Sørensen	(Czech Republic) Sparta Prague	€1.00m	

=== Loans in ===
Date	Pos.	Nat.	Name	Club	Duration	Ref.
17 August 2026	GK	(Germany) (Kosovo)	Diant Ramaj	(Germany) Borussia Dortmund	End of season	
31 August 2026	RW	(Argentina)	Maher Carrizo	(Netherlands) Ajax	End of season	

=== Out ===
Date	Pos.	Nat.	Name	Club	Fee	Ref.
1 July 2026	GK	(England) (Bermuda)	Nathan Trott	(Wales) Cardiff City	€1.80m	
1 July 2026	CB	(Denmark)	Zanka	Without Club	N/A	
7 July 2026	CF	(Sweden)	Viktor Claesson	(Sweden) Värnamo	Free Transfer	
7 July 2026	GK	(Denmark)	Theo Sander	(Sweden) Elfsborg	€400k	
17 July 2026	CB	(Greece)	Pantelis Hatzidiakos	(Greece) PAOK	€1.50m	
20 July 2026	RB	(Portugal)	Aurélio Buta	(Brazil) São Paulo	Free Transfer	
24 July 2026	LW	(Tunisia) (France)	Elias Achouri	(United States) San Diego	€3.50m	
19 August 2026	CF	(Algeria) (Denmark)	Amin Chiakha	(Norway) Rosenborg	€5.00m	
24 August 2026	RW	(Sweden)	Jordan Larsson	(Saudi Arabia) Al-Ettifaq	€1.30m	
1 September 2026	RW	(Norway) (United States)	Liam West	(Norway) Fredrikstads	€750K	

=== Loans out ===
Date	Pos.	Nat.	Name	Club	Duration	Ref.
1 July 2026	CM	(Denmark)	Oliver Højer	(Denmark) Lyngby	30 June 2027	
31 July 2026	GK	(Denmark)	Oscar Buur	(Norway) Hødd	31 December 2026	
7 August 2026	CM	(Denmark)	Jonathan Moalem	(Norway) Strømsgodset	30 June 2027	
13 August 2026	CB	(Zimbabwe)	Munashe Garananga	(Denmark) Lyngby	30 June 2027	
31 August 2026	GK	(Croatia)	Dominik Kotarski	(Croatia) Dinamo Zagreb	30 June 2027	
1 September 2026	CF	(Germany) (Cameroon)	Youssoufa Moukoko	(Turkey) Çorum	30 June 2027	
2 September 2026	CM	(Poland)	Dominik Sarapata	(Czech Republic) Artis Brno	30 June 2027	
11 September 2026	CB	(Brazil)	Gabriel Pereira	(Brazil) Vasco da Gama	30 June 2027	

=== New contracts ===
Date	Pos.	Nat.	Name	Contract until	Ref.
20 June 2026	Assistant Manager	(Denmark)	Kristoffer Wichmann	Undisclosed	
3 August 2026	CF	(Iceland)	Viktor Daðason	30 June 2031	

== Competitions ==
=== Overall record ===
Competition	First match	Last match	Starting round	Record							
Competition	First match	Last match	Starting round	Pld	W	D	L	GF	GA	GD	Win %
Superliga	26 July 2026		Matchday 1	15	10	2	3	29	17	+12	66.67
Danish Cup	15 September 2026		Third round	2	2	0	0	6	0	+6	100.00
Conference League	23 July 2026		Second Qualifying round	8	5	3	0	22	8	+14	62.50
Total				25	17	5	3	57	25	+32	68.00

Last updated: 22 November 2026
Source: Soccerway

Source: Competitive matches

=== Superliga ===
==== League table ====
Pos	Team	Pld	W	D	L	GF	GA	GD	Pts	Qualification
1	Copenhagen	15	10	2	3	29	17	+12	32	Qualification for the Championship round
2	Midtjylland	14	9	5	0	29	17	+12	32	Qualification for the Championship round
3	Viborg	15	8	3	4	22	13	+9	27	Qualification for the Championship round
4	Nordsjælland	15	7	5	3	31	18	+13	26	Qualification for the Championship round
5	Brøndby	14	7	1	6	23	21	+2	22	Qualification for the Championship round

Updated to match(es) played on 22 November 2026. Source: Danish Football Association (in Danish), Soccerway
Rules for classification: 1) Points; 2) Goal difference; 3) Goals scored; 4) Away goals scored; 5) Play-off (played on neutral ground if determining teams for different rounds); 6) Draw.

==== Results summary ====
Overall								Home						Away					
Pld	W	D	L	GF	GA	GD	Pts	W	D	L	GF	GA	GD	W	D	L	GF	GA	GD
15	10	2	3	29	17	+12	32	5	2	0	13	5	+8	5	0	3	16	12	+4

Last updated: 22 November 2026.
Source: FBref

==== Results by round – regular season ====
Round	1	2	4	5	6	3^{1}	7	8	9	10	11	12	13	14	15	16	17	18	19	20	21	22
Ground	H	A	A	A	H	H	A	H	A	A	H	H	A	H	H	A	H	A	H	A	H	A
Result	W	W	W	L	W	W	W	W	W	L	D	D	W	W	L							
Position	1	1	1	5	1	1	1	1	1	1	1	2	2	1								
Points	3	6	9	12	12	15	18	21	24	24	25	26	29	32	32							

Source: http://www.superliga.dk/
- ^{1} Matchday 3 (vs. Nordsjælland) was postponed due to UEFA Conference League progression.
  A = Away; H = Home; W = Win; D = Draw; L = Loss

==== Matches ====
26 July 2026 1	Copenhagen	3–2	Lyngby	Copenhagen
16:00 CEST	Meling 27' 27' (yellow card) 90+2'; López (yellow card) 44'; Elyounoussi 75' (Madsen)	Report	Tytens 36'; Colyn 39'; Þorvaldsson (yellow card) 72'; Allen (yellow card) 90+1'	Stadium: Parken; Attendance: 22,975; Referee: Mikkel Redder

2 August 2026 2	Silkeborg	1–3	Copenhagen	Silkeborg
18:00 CEST	Ross 25' (McCowatt); Møller (yellow card) 50'; Riisgaard (yellow card) 90+1'	Report	Elyounoussi (yellow card) 36' (goal) 42' (Larsson) 45+1' (Clem) 62' (López); López (yellow card) 60'	Stadium: JYSK Park; Attendance: 6,897; Referee: Lasse Læbel Graagaard

16 August 2026 4	Randers	0–4	Copenhagen	Randers
19:00 CEST	Al Hamawi (yellow card) 90+5'	Report	Meling 2' 14' (Král); Madsen 45+1'; López 77' (Král)	Stadium: Cepheus Park Randers; Attendance: 5,260; Referee: Jakob A. Sundberg

23 August 2026 5	Viborg	4–0	Copenhagen	Viborg
18:00 CEST	Meling 1' (o.g.); Dorian Jr. 8' (Søndergaard); Beck 16'; Nouck 68' (Dorian Jr.)	Report	Meling (yellow card) 31'; Robert (yellow card) 63'; Clem (yellow card) 81'	Stadium: Energi Viborg Arena; Attendance: 7,889; Referee: Jacob Karlsen

31 August 2026 6	Copenhagen	3–1	Sønderjyske	Copenhagen
19:00 CEST	Elyounoussi 30' 64'; Madsen 45+4' (Elyounoussi) (yellow card) 53'	Report	Munksgaard 7' (Seydi); Seydi (yellow card) 66'; Bjarnason (red card) 70'	Stadium: Parken; Attendance: 20,073; Referee: Jonas Hansen

3 September 2026 3	Copenhagen	2–0	Nordsjælland	Copenhagen
20:00 CEST	Robert 8' (Elyounoussi); Král 31'; Delaney (yellow card) 62'; Elyounoussi (yellow card) 62'; Clem (yellow card) 70'	Report	Røjkjær (yellow card) 58'; Janssen (yellow card) 62'	Stadium: Parken; Attendance: 24,726; Referee: Sandi Putros
Note: The third match day, during the weekend of 8–9 August, was postponed for four teams who were competing in European competitions. The four clubs involved in the decision—AGF, Copenhagen, Midtjylland, Nordsjælland—agreed unanimously to the change to maximise their chances of success in Europe and reduce player fatigue. The postponed games were moved to early September.

6 September 2026 7	OB	0–5	Copenhagen	Odense
19:00 CEST	McCoy (yellow card) 12'; Ganaus (yellow card) 73'<	Report	Maseko 5' (Suzuki) 76' (Nasnas); Sørensen 24' (Robert); Meling (yellow card) 45'; Kral (yellow card) 81'; Nasnas 82' (Suzuki); Carrizo 89' (pen.)	Stadium: Odense Stadium; Attendance: 10,621; Referee: Jens Maae

11 September 2026 8	Copenhagen	2–0	Horsens	Copenhagen
19:00 CEST	Beijmo 7'; Daðason 49' (Meling); Markgráf (yellow card) 85'	Report	Tauriainen (yellow card) 37'; Ceesay (yellow card) 84'; Batigi (yellow card) 90+2'	Stadium: Parken; Attendance: 26,172; Referee: Frederik Svendsen

20 September 2026 9	Brøndby	0–1	Copenhagen	Brøndbyvester
14:00 CEST	Younis (yellow card) 51'	Report	Robert (yellow card) 59'; Cornelius 79'	Stadium: Brøndby Stadium; Attendance: 25,621; Referee: Mikkel Redder

11 October 2026 10	Midtjylland	2–1	Copenhagen	Herning
14:00 CEST	Etim 12' (Billing); Castillo 62' (Etim); Maxsø (yellow card) 90+2'	Report	López (yellow card) 45+3'; Elyounoussi 49' (pen.); Delaney (yellow card) 64'; Clem (yellow card) 90+1'; Svensson (yellow card) 90+5'	Stadium: MCH Arena; Attendance: 12,041; Referee: Jacob Karlsen

18 October 2026 11	Copenhagen	1–1	AGF	Copenhagen
18:00 CEST	Robert 35' (López); Král (yellow card) 75'	Report	Serra 63' (Emmery); Mølgaard (yellow card) 90+1'	Stadium: Parken; Attendance: 28,359; Referee: Lasse Kirk Graagaard

26 October 2026 12	Copenhagen	1–1	OB	Copenhagen
19:00 CEST	Meling 77'	Report	Ulvestad (yellow card) 30'; Ganaus 34' (Keskinen); Grot (yellow card) 79'	Stadium: Parken; Attendance: 21,717; Referee: Frederik Svendsen

2 November 2026 13	Sønderjyske	0–2	Copenhagen	Haderslev
19:00 CEST	Seydi (yellow card) 24'; Kristensen (yellow card) 26'; Christensen (yellow card) 90+1'	Report	Beijmo 20'; Cornelius 40' (Madsen); Madsen (yellow card) 61'	Stadium: Sydbank Park; Attendance: 5,449; Referee: Mikkel Redder

8 November 2026 14	Copenhagen	1–0	Brøndby	Copenhagen
12:00 CEST	Huescas (yellow card) 10'; Madsen (yellow card) 18'; Clem 54'	Report	Ejdum (yellow card) 57'; Dennis (yellow card) 76'	Stadium: Parken; Attendance: 34,348; Referee: Jakob A. Sundberg

22 November 2026 15	Nordsjælland	5–0	Copenhagen	Farum
18:00 CEST	Røjkjær; Ankersen (yellow card) 51'; Lähteenmäki 67' (Adel); Adel; Lind 74' (Sadio) 83' (Walker)	Report	Huescas (yellow card) 31'; Markgráf (red card) 60'; Svensson (yellow card) 64'	Stadium: Right to Dream Park; Referee: Sandi Putros

29 November 2026 16	Copenhagen	v	Midtjylland	Copenhagen
16:00 CEST		Report		Stadium: Parken

6 December 2026 17	Horsens	v	Copenhagen	Horsens
18:00 CEST		Report		Stadium: Hybel Arena Horsens

=== Danish Cup ===
15 September 2026 Third Round	Skovshoved	0–3	Copenhagen	Copenhagen
18:00 CEST	Hildebrandt (yellow card) 51'; Niebe (yellow card) 62'; Priisholm (yellow card) 81'	Report	Ndjee 31' (Myrie); Clem 59'; Daðason 68' (Markgráf)	Stadium: Vanløse Idrætspark; Attendance: 5,751; Referee: Mads-Kristoffer Kristoffersen

29 October 2026 Fourth Round	Aarhus Fremad	0–3	Copenhagen	Aarhus
TBD CEST	Grube (yellow card) 66'; Kirchheiner (yellow card) 90+1'	Report	Markgráf (yellow card) 13'; Clem 20' (Huescas); Meling (yellow card) 35'; Elyounoussi 39'; Suzuki (yellow card) 58'; Ludwig 71' (o.g.); Olsen (yellow card) 85'	Stadium: Riisvangen Stadium; Attendance: 4,125; Referee: Morten Krogh

2 December 2026 Quarter-finals first leg	Copenhagen	v	Midtjylland	Copenhagen
19:30 CET				Stadium: Parken

13 December 2026 Quarter-finals second leg	Midtjylland	v	Copenhagen	Herning
18:00 CET				Stadium: MCH Arena

=== UEFA Conference League ===
==== Second qualifying round ====
22 July 2025 First Leg	Polissya Zhytomyr (Ukraine)	3–3	Copenhagen	Košice, Slovakia
20:00 CEST	Krasnopir 6' (Nazarenko); Fedor 36' (Andriyevskyi) (yellow card) 59'; Tomandzoto (yellow card) 74'; Filippov 88' (Veleten)	Report	Robert 4' (Madsen) 54' (Elyounoussi); Suzuki (yellow card) 42'; Clem (yellow card) 67'; Madsen 90+3' (Moukoko)	Stadium: Košická futbalová aréna Attendance: 2,268; Referee: David Rafael Oliveira Da Silva (Portugal)

29 July 2025 Second Leg	Copenhagen	2–1 (5–4 agg.)	(Ukraine) Polissya Zhytomyr	Copenhagen
20:00 CEST	Elyounoussi 27' (pen.); Suzuki (red card) 46'; Robert 61' (Madsen); Delaney (yellow card) 66'	Report	Nazarenko (yellow card) 30'; Hayduchyk 90+3' (Krushynskyi)	Stadium: Parken; Attendance: 20,541; Referee: Marek Radina (Czech Republic)

==== Third qualifying round ====
6 August 2025 First Leg	Debrecen (Hungary)	0–3	Copenhagen	Debrecen, Hungary
20:00 CEST	Baldoni (yellow card) 15'; Bošković (yellow card) 36'	Report	Gabriel Pereira 21' (López); Robert 35'; Clem (yellow card) 80'; Cornelius 90+1' (Elyounoussi)	Stadium: Nagyerdei Stadion; Attendance: 6,120; Referee: Enea Jorgji (Albania)

12 August 2025 Second Leg	Copenhagen	5–1 (3–1 agg.)	(Hungary) Debrecen	Copenhagen
19:00 CEST	Elyounoussi 3' (Robert) 58' (pen.); Ndjee (yellow card) 67'; Král 76' (Cornelius); Cornelius 78' (Král) 90+2' (Nasnas)	Report	Dzsudzsák 47'; Myrtaj (yellow card) 57'; Kaye (yellow card) 61'	Stadium: Parken; Attendance: 19,235; Referee: Jérémie Pignard (France)

==== Play-off round ====
20 August 2025 First Leg	Inter Turku (Finland)	0–0	Copenhagen	Turku, Finland
18:00 CEST		Report		Stadium: Kupittaa Football Stadium; Attendance: 5,489; Referee: Goga Kikacheishvili (Georgia (country))

27 August 2025 Second Leg	Copenhagen	4–1 (4–1 agg.)	(Finland) Inter Turku	Copenhagen
19:00 CEST	Gabriel Pereira 41'; Robert (yellow card) 45+1'; Madsen 49'; Clem 78' (Elyounoussi); Ahiabu 90+3' (o.g.)	Report	Kuittinen (yellow card) 43'; Niska (yellow card) 43'; Tuominen 69' (pen.)	Stadium: Parken; Attendance: 18,528; Referee: Oleksiy Derevinskyi (Ukraine)

==== League phase ====
===== League phase table =====
Pos	Team	Pld	W	D	L	GF	GA	GD	Pts	Qualification
5	(England) Brighton & Hove Albion	3	2	1	0	5	0	+5	7	Advance to round of 16 (seeded)
6	(Norway) Brann	3	2	1	0	7	3	+4	7	Advance to round of 16 (seeded)
7	(Denmark) Copenhagen	3	2	1	0	7	3	+4	7	Advance to round of 16 (seeded)
8	(Romania) Universitatea Craiova	3	2	1	0	6	2	+4	7	Advance to round of 16 (seeded)
9	(Sweden) Mjällby AIF	3	2	1	0	5	1	+4	7	Advance to knockout phase play-offs (seeded)

Updated to match(es) played on 5 November 2026. Source: UEFA
Rules for classification: League phase tiebreakers

===== Results by round =====
- Matchday listings solely for opponent identification - match dates/times to be determined

Round	1	2	3	4	5	6
Ground	H	A	H	A	H	A
Result	W	D	W			
Position	2	10	7			
Points	3	4	7			

Updated to match(es) played on 22 October 2026. Source: UEFA
A = Away; H = Home; W = Win; D = Draw; L = Loss; P = Postponed

15 October 2026 Matchday 1	Copenhagen	3–0	(Portugal) Braga	Copenhagen
18:45 CEST	Elyounoussi 49'; Markgráf (yellow card) 71'; Cornelius 79' (Meling) 86' (Maseko); Németh (yellow card) 85'	Report		Stadium: Parken; Attendance: 24,636; Referee: Joey Kooij (Netherlands)

22 October 2026 Matchday 2	Red Star Belgrade (Serbia)	2–2	Copenhagen	Belgrade, Serbia
18:45 CEST	Nakayama (yellow card) 22'; Elšnik 34' (Lučić); Krunić (yellow card) 38'; Kostov 41' (Ristić); Gudelj (red card) 90+3'	Report	Suzuki (yellow card) 12'; Gashtarov 29' (o.g.); Németh (yellow card) 40'; Carrizo 70' (Markgráf)	Stadium: Rajko Mitić Stadium; Attendance: 16,234; Referee: Radu Petrescu (Romania)

5 November 2026 Matchday 3	Copenhagen	2–1	(Georgia (country)) Iberia 1999	Copenhagen
18:45 CEST	Ndjee (yellow card) 7'; Elyounoussi 19' (pen.); Selimović 22' (o.g.); Ramaj (yellow card) 53'; Markgráf (yellow card) 73'	Report	Natchkebia (yellow card) 5'; Makaridze (yellow card) 18'; Dzagania 30'; Dadiani (yellow card) 44'; Selimović (yellow card) 76'; Lucas Café (yellow card) 90+4'	Stadium: Parken; Attendance: 18,660; Referee: Rob Hennessy (Ireland)

26 November 2026 Matchday 4	Inter Club d'Escaldes (Andorra)	v	Copenhagen	Encamp, Andorra
18:45 CEST				Stadium: Estadi de la FAF

10 December 2026 Matchday 5	Copenhagen	v	(Switzerland) Lugano	Copenhagen
18:45 CEST				Stadium: Parken

17 December 2026 Matchday 6	Universitatea Craiova (Romania)	v	Copenhagen	Craiova, Romania
18:45 CEST				Stadium: Ion Oblemenco Stadium

== Statistics ==
As of 22 November 2026

=== Appearances and goals ===
No.	Pos	Nat	Player	Total		Superliga		Danish Cup		Conference League	
No.	Pos	Nat	Player	Apps	Goals	Apps	Goals	Apps	Goals	Apps	Goals
1	GK	(Germany) GER	Diant Ramaj	16	0	11	0	1	0	4	0
2	DF	(Sweden) SWE	Felix Beijmo	25	2	15	2	2	0	7+1	0
4	DF	(Denmark) DEN	Asger Sørensen	15	1	11+1	1	0+1	0	2	0
5	DF	(Brazil) BRA	Gabriel Pereira	11	2	5	0	0	0	5+1	2
6	DF	(Hungary) HUN	Ákos Markgráf	16	0	10	0	2	0	2+2	0
7	FW	(Argentina) ARG	Maher Carrizo	8	2	0+4	1	2	0	2	1
9	FW	(Germany) GER	Youssoufa Moukoko	5	0	2	0	0	0	1+2	0
10	FW	(Norway) NOR	Mohamed Elyounoussi	24	13	14	7	1	1	8+1	5
11	FW	(Sweden) SWE	Jordan Larsson	2	0	1	0	0	0	0+1	0
12	FW	(South Africa) RSA	Thapelo Maseko	8	2	2+3	2	1	0	1+1	0
13	DF	(Mexico) MEX	Rodrigo Huescas	6	0	3	0	1	0	1+1	0
14	FW	(Denmark) DEN	Andreas Cornelius	17	7	9+1	2	0	0	4+3	5
15	DF	(Peru) PER	Marcos López	19	1	8+3	1	0+1	0	6+1	0
16	FW	(Brazil) BRA	Robert	23	6	13+1	2	0	0	8+1	4
18	DF	(Costa Rica) CRC	Kenay Myrie	2	0	0	0	1	0	0+1	0
20	DF	(Japan) JPN	Junnosuke Suzuki	21	0	5+6	0	2	0	8	0
21	MF	(Denmark) DEN	Mads Emil Madsen	21	4	10+2	2	0+1	0	6+2	2
24	DF	(Norway) NOR	Birger Meling	19	5	8+5	5	1	0	4+1	0
27	MF	(Denmark) DEN	Thomas Delaney	23	0	5+9	0	1	0	4+4	0
28	MF	(Hungary) HUN	Hunor Németh	5	0	0+1	0	1	0	2+1	0
31	GK	(Iceland) ISL	Rúnar Alex Rúnarsson	6	0	1+2	0	1	0	2	0
33	MF	(Czech Republic) CZE	Alex Král	25	2	11+4	1	0+2	0	7+1	1
34	MF	(Denmark) DEN	Marvin Nasnas	15	1	0+8	1	1	0	0+6	0
36	MF	(Denmark) DEN	William Clem	24	4	12+2	1	2	2	6+2	1
37	DF	(The Gambia) GAM	Mustapha Nyassi	1	0	0	0	0	0	1	0
39	FW	(Iceland) ISL	Viktor Daðason	18	2	4+7	1	1+1	1	2+3	0
40	DF	(Norway) NOR	Henrik Haraldsen	1	0	0	0	0+1	0	0	0
44	FW	(Cameroon) CMR	Geovanni Vianney Ndjee	15	1	2+6	0	1+1	1	3+2	0
45	MF	(Iceland) ISL	Gunnar Orri Olsen	3	0	0	0	0+2	0	0+1	0
Players who are away on loan:
1	GK	(Croatia) CRO	Dominik Kotarski	6	0	3	0	0	0	3	0
Players who left during the season:
4	DF	(Zimbabwe) ZIM	Munashe Garananga	3	0	0+1	0	0	0	1+1	0

=== Goal scorers ===
Place	Position	Nation	Number	Name	Superliga	Danish Cup	Conference League	Total
1	FW	(Norway)	10	Mohamed Elyounoussi	7	1	5	13
2	FW	(Denmark)	14	Andreas Cornelius	2	0	5	7
3	FW	(Brazil)	16	Robert	2	0	4	6
4	DF	(Norway)	24	Birger Meling	5	0	0	5
5	MF	(Denmark)	21	Mads Emil Madsen	2	0	2	4
5	MF	(Denmark)	36	William Clem	1	2	1	4
7	DF	(Brazil)	5	Gabriel Pereira	0	0	2	2
7	MF	(Czech Republic)	33	Alex Král	1	0	1	2
7	FW	(South Africa)	12	Thapelo Maseko	2	0	0	2
7	FW	(Iceland)	39	Viktor Daðason	1	1	0	2
7	FW	(Argentina)	7	Maher Carrizo	1	0	1	2
7	DF	(Sweden)	2	Felix Beijmo	2	0	0	2
13	DF	(Peru)	15	Marcos López	1	0	0	1
13	DF	(Denmark)	4	Asger Sørensen	1	0	0	1
13	MF	(Denmark)	34	Marvin Nasnas	1	0	1	0
13	FW	(Cameroon)	44	Geovanni Vianney Ndjee	0	1	0	1
Opponent's own goal(s)					0	1	3	4
Players who are away on loan
Players who left during the season:
Total					29	6	24	59

=== Assists ===
Place	Position	Nation	Number	Name	Superliga	Danish Cup	Conference League	Total
1	FW	(Norway)	10	Mohamed Elyounoussi	2	0	3	5
2	MF	(Denmark)	21	Mads Emil Madsen	2	0	2	4
3	MF	(Czech Republic)	33	Alex Král	2	0	1	3
3	DF	(Peru)	15	Marcos López	2	0	1	3
5	FW	(Denmark)	14	Andreas Cornelius	0	0	2	2
5	DF	(Japan)	20	Junnosuke Suzuki	2	0	0	2
5	FW	(Brazil)	16	Robert	1	0	1	2
5	MF	(Denmark)	34	Marvin Nasnas	1	0	1	2
5	DF	(Norway)	24	Birger Meling	1	0	1	2
5	DF	(Hungary)	6	Ákos Markgráf	0	1	1	2
11	MF	(Denmark)	36	William Clem	1	0	0	1
11	DF	(Costa Rica)	18	Kenay Myrie	0	1	0	1
11	DF	(Hungary) (Denmark)	28	Hunor Németh	0	0	1	1
11	DF	(Mexico)	13	Rodrigo Huescas	0	1	0	1
Players who left during the season:
	FW	(Sweden)	11	Jordan Larsson	1	0	0	1
Total					15	3	14	32

=== Clean sheets ===
Place	Position	Nation	Number	Name	Superliga	Danish Cup	Conference League	Total
1	GK	(Germany) (Germany)	41	Diant Ramaj	6	1	1	8
2	GK	(Iceland)	31	Rúnar Alex Rúnarsson	0	1	1	2
Players who are away on loan
	GK	(Croatia)	1	Dominik Kotarski	1	0	1	2
Total					7	2	3	12

=== Hat-tricks ===
Player	Against	Result	Date	Competition	Ref
Mohamed Elyounoussi	Silkeborg	3–1	2 August 2026	2026-27 Danish Superliga	

=== Disciplinary record ===
Number	Nation	Position	Name	Superliga			Danish Cup			Conference League			Total		
Number	Nation	Position	Name	Yellow card	(yellow card) (yellow-red card)	Red card	Yellow card	(yellow card) (yellow-red card)	Red card	Yellow card	(yellow card) (yellow-red card)	Red card	Yellow card	(yellow card) (yellow-red card)	Red card
1	(Germany) (Kosovo)	GK	Diant Ramaj	0	0	0	0	0	0	1	0	0	1	0	0
6	(Hungary)	DF	Ákos Markgráf	1	0	1	1	0	0	2	0	0	4	0	1
10	(Norway)	FW	Mohamed Elyounoussi	2	0	0	0	0	0	0	0	0	2	0	0
13	(Mexico)	DF	Rodrigo Huescas	2	0	0	0	0	0	0	0	0	2	0	0
15	(Peru)	DF	Marcos López	3	0	0	0	0	0	0	0	0	3	0	0
16	(Brazil)	FW	Robert	2	0	0	0	0	0	1	0	0	3	0	0
20	(Japan)	DF	Junnosuke Suzuki	0	0	0	1	0	0	2	0	1	3	0	1
21	(Denmark)	MF	Mads Emil Madsen	3	0	0	0	0	0	0	0	0	3	0	0
24	(Norway)	DF	Birger Meling	3	0	0	1	0	0	0	0	0	4	0	0
27	(Denmark)	MF	Thomas Delaney	2	0	0	0	0	0	1	0	0	3	0	0
28	(Hungary) (Denmark)	MF	Hunor Németh	0	0	0	0	0	0	2	0	0	2	0	0
33	(Czech Republic)	MF	Alex Král	2	0	0	0	0	0	0	0	0	2	0	0
36	(Denmark)	MF	William Clem	3	0	0	0	0	0	2	0	0	5	0	0
44	(Cameroon)	FW	Geovanni Vianney Ndjee	0	0	0	0	0	0	2	0	0	2	0	0
45	(Iceland)	MF	Gunnar Orri Olsen	0	0	0	1	0	0	0	0	0	1	0	0
Total				26	0	1	4	0	0	10	0	1	40	0	2

== Home attendance ==
As of 8 November 2026

Competition	Total	Games	Average
Superliga	178,370	7	25,481
Danish Cup	0	0	0
Conference League	101,600	5	20,320
Total	279,970	12	23,331
