= Felix Beijmo =

Swedish footballer (born 1998)

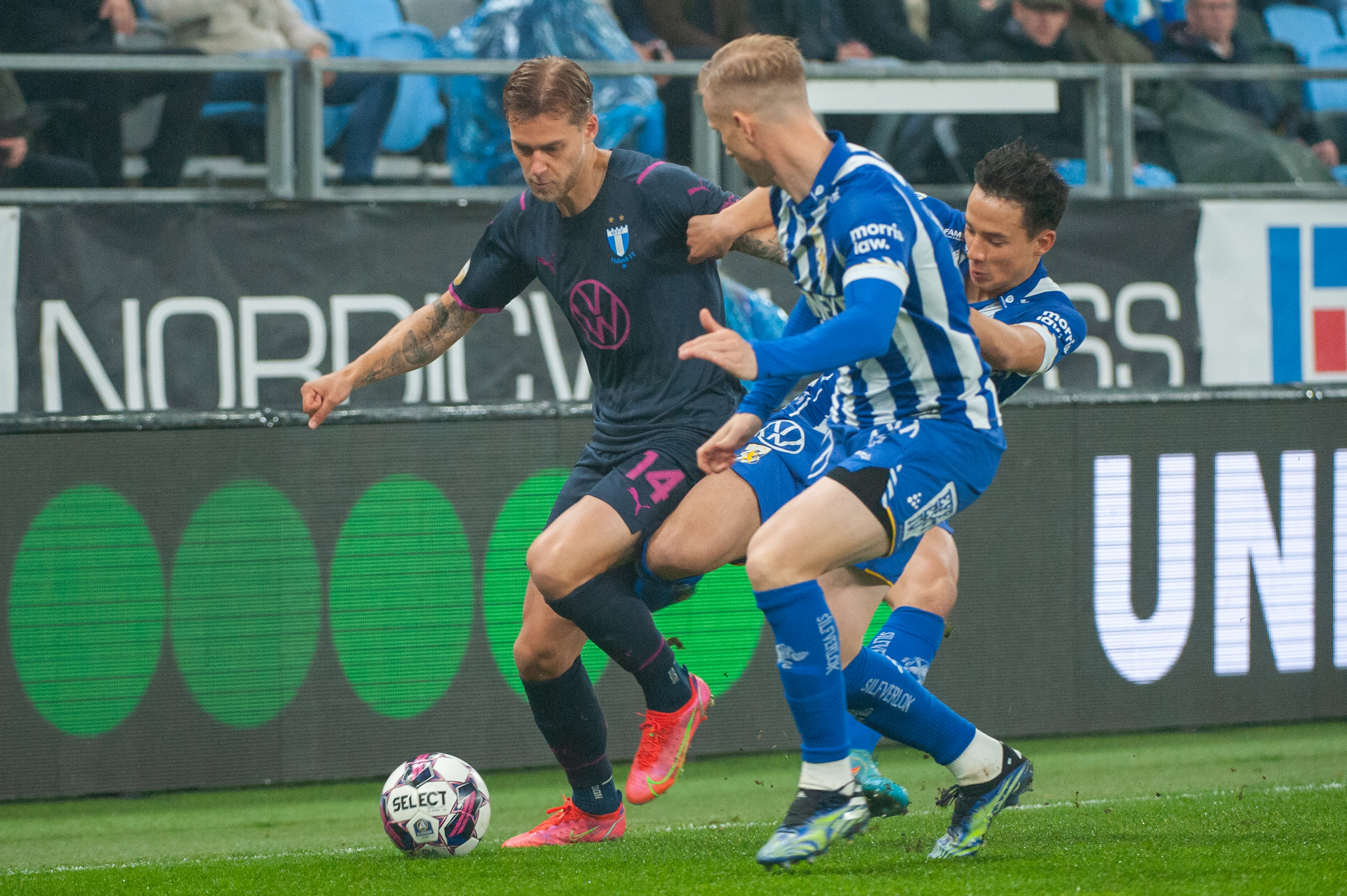
- Beijmo (left) playing for Malmö FF in 2022

Personal information
- Full name: Felix Olof Allan Nelson Beijmo
- Date of birth: 31 January 1998 (age 28)
- Place of birth: Stockholm, Sweden
- Height: 1.85 m (6 ft 1 in)
- Position: Defender

Team information
- Current team: Copenhagen
- Number: 2

Youth career
- Ängby IF
- 2005–2015: Brommapojkarna

Senior career*
Years	Team	Apps	(Gls)
2015–2017	Brommapojkarna	34	(1)
2017–2018	Djurgården	37	(3)
2018–2020	Werder Bremen	0	(0)
2018	Werder Bremen II	3	(0)
2019	→ Malmö FF (loan)	8	(1)
2020	→ Greuther Fürth (loan)	5	(0)
2020–2023	Malmö FF	44	(1)
2023	→ AGF (loan)	14	(0)
2023–2026	AGF	88	(6)
2026–	Copenhagen	12	(1)

International career^{‡}
2014–2015	Sweden U17	9	(0)
2015–2017	Sweden U19	12	(0)
2018–2020	Sweden U21	13	(2)
2026–	Sweden	3	(0)
- * Club domestic league appearances and goals as of 21:03, 26 October 2026 (UTC) ‡ National team caps and goals as of 17 November 2026

Felix Olof Allan Nelson Beijmo (born 31 January 1998) is a Swedish professional footballer who plays as a defender for Danish Superliga club FC Copenhagen and the Sweden national team.

== Club career ==
=== Youth career ===
Beijmo started out playing for Brommapojkarna at age seven, leaving his local club Ängby IF. He took part in the TV4-show called Fotbollsfabriken (The Football factory) which plotted the best 15-years old players in the academy of Brommapojkarna.

=== Djurgårdens IF ===
On 30 March 2017, Beijmo signed a four-year deal with Allsvenskan side Djurgårdens IF. He chose Djurgården after stiff competition for his signature from Malmö FF among others. On 10 May 2018, he played as Djurgården beat Malmö FF 3–0 in the Swedish Cup Final.

=== Werder Bremen ===
In June 2018, Beijmo joined Bundesliga side Werder Bremen for the 2018–19 season having agreed a "long-term" contract. The reported fee of around €3 million made him the most expensive defender ever to leave the Swedish top flight Allsvenskan.

==== Loan to Malmö FF ====
In August 2019, he returned to Sweden having agreed a loan until the end of the season with Malmö FF.

==== Loan to Greuther Fürth ====
On 31 January 2020, the last day of the 2019–20 winter transfer period, Beijmo was loaned out to SpVgg Greuther Fürth until the end of the 2019–20 season.

=== Malmö FF ===
In August 2020, Beijmo returned to Sweden re-joining Malmö FF. He signed a three-year contract.

=== AGF ===
In January 2023, Beijmo signed for Supeliga club AGF on loan until the summer. On 21 June 2023, AGF signed Beijmo on a three-year contract. In 2026 he won the Danish Championship with the club, the first in 40 years. After winning the title, he announced his intentions to leave the club as his contract had expired, despite the club wanting to keep him.

=== Copenhagen ===
On 22 May 2026, Beijmo signed a four-year contract with Copenhagen ahead of the 2026–27 season.

== International career ==
Beijmo represented the Sweden U17, Sweden U19, and Sweden U21 teams between 2014 and 2020.

On 5 October 2026, Beijmo made his debut for the Sweden national team in a 2026–27 UEFA Nations League B game against Romania.

== Career statistics ==
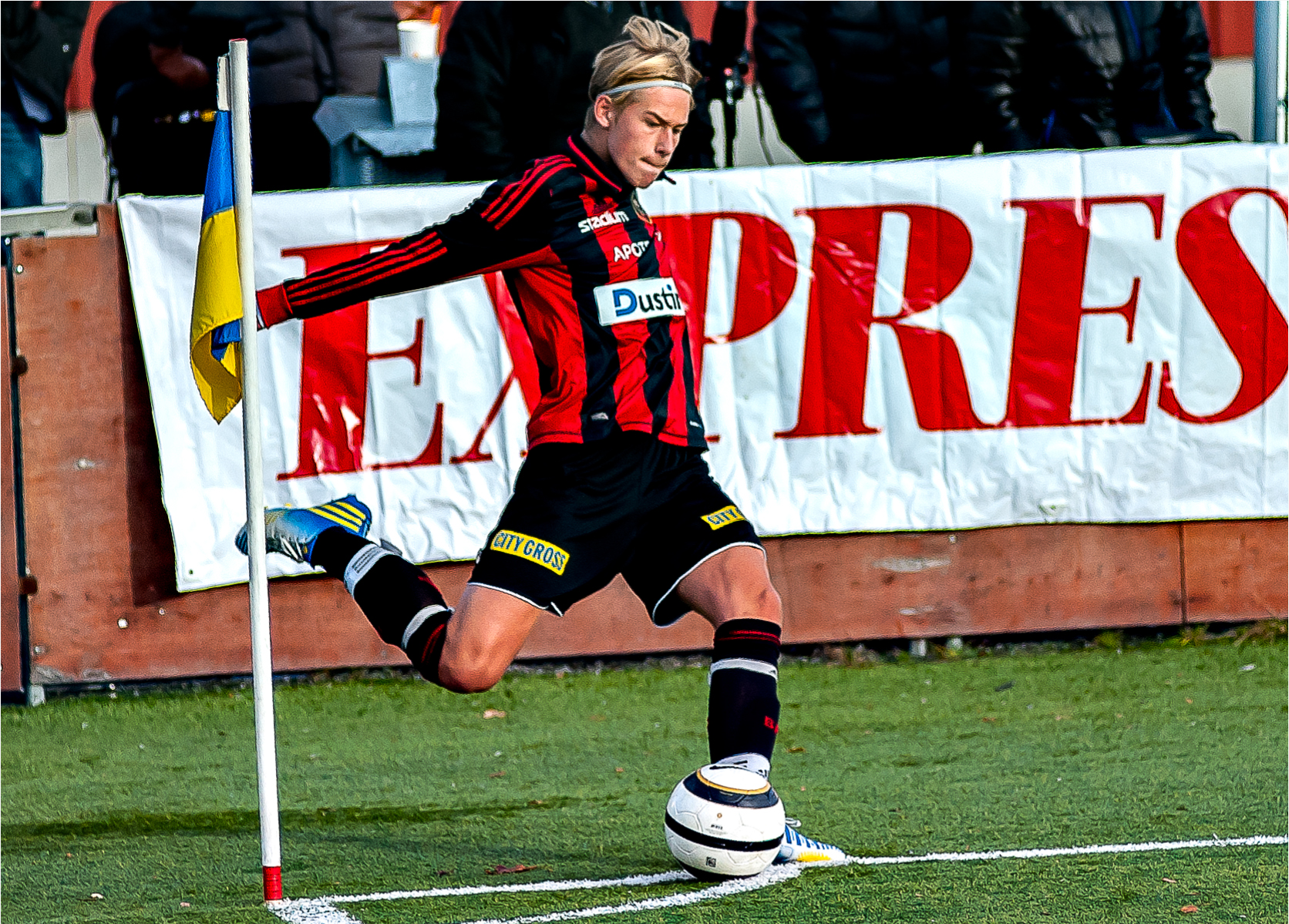
Beijmo playing for Brommapojkarna in 2013

As of 29 October 2026

Appearances and goals by club, season and competition
Club	Season	League			National cup (Note: Includes Svenska Cupen)		Continental		Total	
Club	Season	Division	Apps	Goals	Apps	Goals	Apps	Goals	Apps	Goals
Brommapojkarna	2015	Superettan	10	0	1	0	—		11	0
Brommapojkarna	2016	Division 1	24	1	5	2	—		29	2
Brommapojkarna	2017	Superettan	0	0	4	0	—		4	0
Brommapojkarna	Total		34	1	10	2	0	0	44	3
Djurgårdens IF	2017	Allsvenskan	26	2	6	1	—		32	3
Djurgårdens IF	2018	Allsvenskan	11	1	4	0	0	0	15	1
Djurgårdens IF	Total		37	3	10	2	0	0	41	3
Werder Bremen II	2018–19	Regionalliga Nord	3	0	—		—		3	0
Malmö FF (loan)	2019	Allsvenskan	8	1	1	0	4 (Note: Appearances in UEFA Europa League)	0	13	1
Greuther Fürth (loan)	2019–20	2. Bundesliga	5	0	0	0	—		5	0
Malmö FF	2020	Allsvenskan	3	0	1	0	0	0	4	0
Malmö FF	2021	Allsvenskan	14	0	3	0	0	0	17	0
Malmö FF	2022	Allsvenskan	27	1	5	0	6 (Note: Appearances in UEFA Champions League)	0	38	1
Malmö FF	2023	Allsvenskan	0	0	0	0	14	1	14	1
Malmö FF	Total		44	1	9	0	20	1	73	2
AGF	2022–23	Danish Superliga	14	0	0	0	0	0	14	0
AGF	2023–24	Danish Superliga	26	2	6	2	2 (Note: Appearances in UEFA Conference League)	1	34	5
AGF	2024–25	Danish Superliga	31	2	3	0	0	0	34	2
AGF	2025–26	Danish Superliga	32	2	6	1	0	0	38	3
AGF	Total		103	6	15	3	2	0	120	10
Copenhagen	2026–27	Danish Superliga	12	1	2	0	8	0	22	1
Career total			246	13	47	6	34	2	327	20

=== International ===
As of match played 17 November 2026

Appearances and goals by national team and year
National team	Year	Apps	Goals
Sweden	2026	3	0
Total		3	0

== Honours ==
Djurgårdens IF

- Svenska Cupen: 2017–18

Malmö FF

- Allsvenskan: 2020, 2021
- Svenska Cupen: 2021–22

AGF

- Danish Superliga: 2025–26

Individual

- Danish Superliga Team of the Month: August 2023
- Danish Superliga Team of the Year: 2025–26
