= Asger Sørensen =

Danish footballer (born 1996)

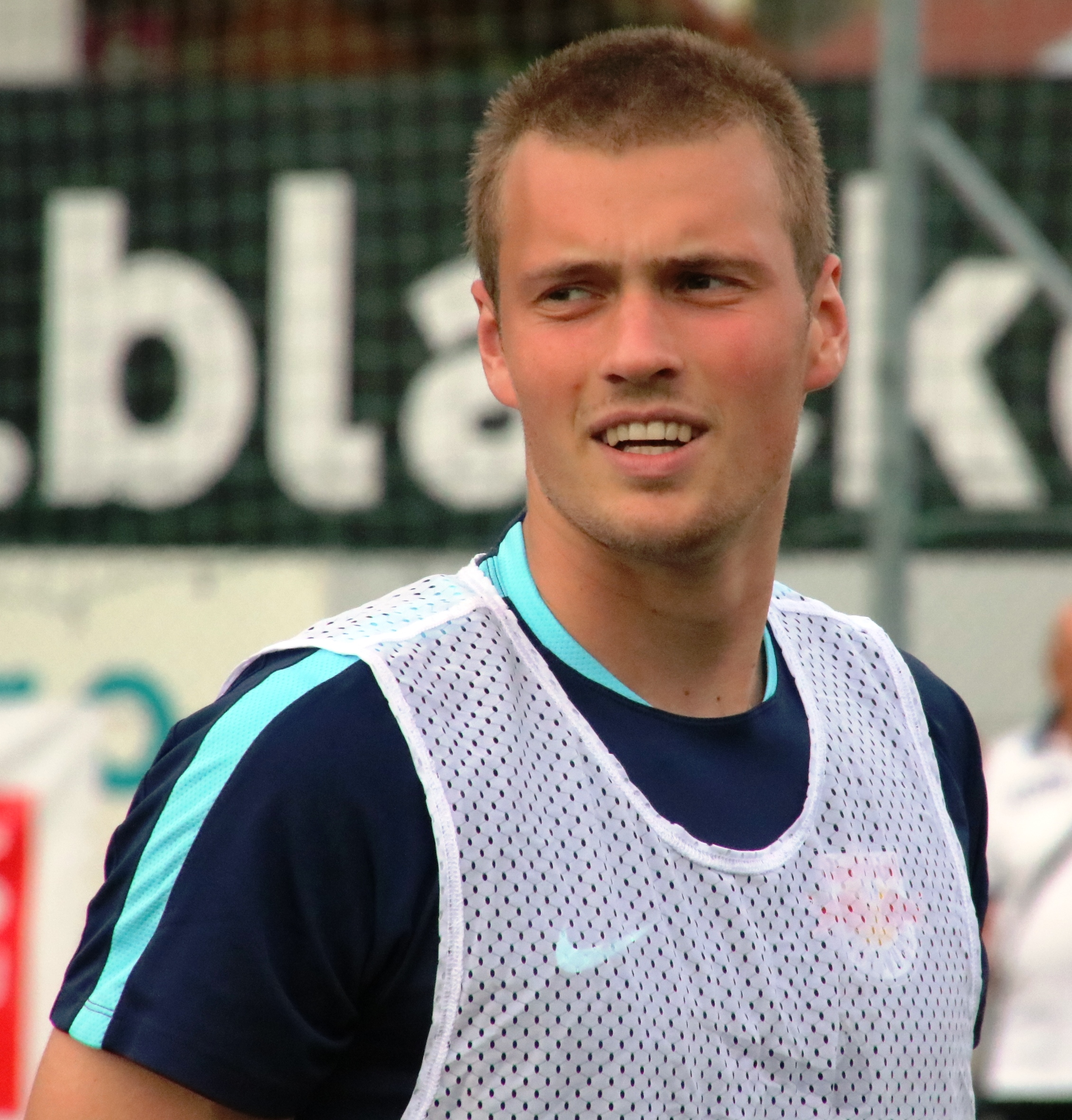
- Sørensen with Red Bull Salzburg in 2016

Personal information
- Full name: Asger Strømgaard Sørensen
- Date of birth: 5 June 1996 (age 30)
- Place of birth: Virklund, Denmark
- Height: 1.91 m (6 ft 3 in)
- Position: Centre-back

Team information
- Current team: Copenhagen
- Number: 4

Youth career
- Virklund Boldklub
- Silkeborg
- 2011–2014: Midtjylland

Senior career*
Years	Team	Apps	(Gls)
2014–2019	FC Liefering	41	(1)
2014–2019	Red Bull Salzburg	3	(0)
2017–2019	→ Jahn Regensburg (loan)	52	(0)
2019–2022	1. FC Nürnberg	88	(8)
2022–2026	Sparta Prague	102	(9)
2026–	Copenhagen	9	(1)

International career
2011–2012	Denmark U16	5	(0)
2012–2013	Denmark U17	10	(3)
2014	Denmark U18	2	(0)
2015	Denmark U20	1	(0)
2017–2019	Denmark U21	11	(0)
- * Club domestic league appearances and goals as of 26 October 2026

Asger Strømgaard Sørensen (born 5 June 1996) is a Danish professional footballer who plays as a centre-back for Danish Superliga club Copenhagen.

His former clubs include Liefering, Red Bull Salzburg, Jahn Regensburg and 1. FC Nürnberg.

== Club career ==
A defender, Sørensen began his career at the lower levels at Virklund Boldklub before moving to Silkeborg IF, before finally signing with the Midtjylland youth academy. On 23 September 2013, he made his senior debut for Midtjylland in a Danish Cup match against FC Djursland. This would be his only appearance for the club. In January 2014, he was signed by Red Bull Salzburg and was subsequently placed in their feeder club FC Liefering. Sørensen made his debut for the side on 7 March 2014 in a home game against Austria Lustenau.

An ankle injury kept Sørensen sidelined for most of the 2014–15 season, only making his return in the 30th round of competition for FC Liefering. However, a hand fracture meant that he would be sidelined for another extended period of time, making only nine appearances during the 2015–16 season. He played more regularly the following season, making 15 appearances in which he scored one goal. Sørensen made 41 total appearances for Liefering, scoring one goal, while making three total appearances for Red Bull Salzburg.

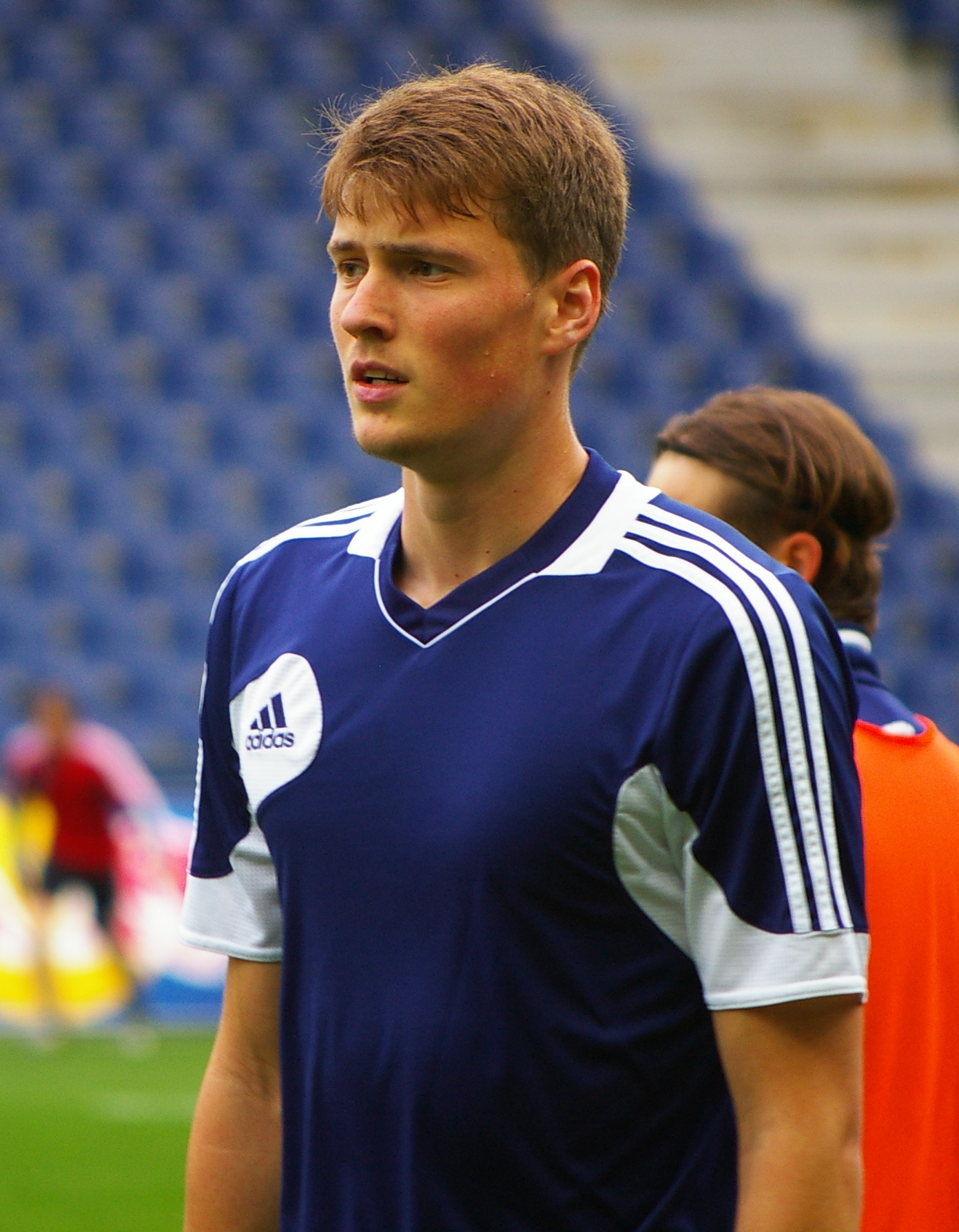
Sørensen with Liefering in 2014.

In July 2017, Red Bull Salzburg loaned Sørensen to 2. Bundesliga club Jahn Regensburg on a two-year loan deal. He made 52 total appearances for Jahn Regensburg during his tenure there.

Sørensen did not return to Salzburg ahead of the 2019–20 season, instead signing a two-year contract with recently relegated 1. FC Nürnberg in the 2. Bundesliga. On 27 July 2019, he made his debut for the club in league match against Dynamo Dresden away at Rudolf-Harbig-Stadion, which ended in a 1–0 win for Nürnberg. On 20 July 2022, Sørensen signed for Czech club Sparta Prague. During his first season in Prague, he helped the club to win its first championship title since 2014. He was awarded as the defender and foreign player of the 2022–23 season by League Football Association (LFA). On 21 February 2024, Sørensen signed a new multi-year contract with the club.

On 22 August 2026, Sørensen signed a three-year contract with Danish Superliga club Copenhagen.

== International career ==
Sørensen made five appearances for the Denmark under-16 team and 10 appearances for the under-17 team. Later, he would also go on to gain three and one caps, respectively, for the Denmark under-18 team and under-20 team.

On 31 August 2017, Sørensen made his debut for the Denmark national under-21 team in a 3–0 win over the Faroe Islands in Tórshavn in a 2019 UEFA European Under-21 Championship qualification match.

== Career statistics ==
=== Club ===
As of match played 26 October 2026

Appearances and goals by club, season and competition
Club	Season	League			National cup		Europe		Other		Total	
Club	Season	Division	Apps	Goals	Apps	Goals	Apps	Goals	Apps	Goals	Apps	Goals
Midtjylland	2013–14	Danish Superliga	0	0	1	0	—		—		1	0
FC Liefering	2013–14	2. Liga	10	0	—		—		—		10	0
FC Liefering	2014–15	2. Liga	7	0	—		—		—		7	0
FC Liefering	2015–16	2. Liga	9	0	—		—		—		9	0
FC Liefering	2016–17	2. Liga	15	1	—		—		—		15	1
FC Liefering	Total		41	1	—		—		—		41	1
Red Bull Salzburg	2014–15	Austrian Bundesliga	1	0	—		—		—		1	0
Red Bull Salzburg	2015–16	Austrian Bundesliga	2	0	1	0	1 (Note: Appearance(s) in UEFA Europa League)	0	—		4	0
Red Bull Salzburg	2016–17	Austrian Bundesliga	0	0	1	1	—		—		1	1
Red Bull Salzburg	Total		3	0	2	1	1	0	—		6	1
Jahn Regensburg (loan)	2017–18	2. Bundesliga	25	1	1	0	—		—		26	1
Jahn Regensburg (loan)	2018–19	2. Bundesliga	27	0	1	0	—		—		28	0
Jahn Regensburg (loan)	Total		52	1	2	1	—		—		54	1
1. FC Nürnberg	2019–20	2. Bundesliga	26	6	2	0	—		—		28	6
1. FC Nürnberg	2020–21	2. Bundesliga	31	1	1	0	—		—		32	1
1. FC Nürnberg	2021–22	2. Bundesliga	30	1	2	0	—		—		32	1
1. FC Nürnberg	2022–23	2. Bundesliga	1	0	—		—		—		1	0
1. FC Nürnberg	Total		88	8	5	0	—		—		93	8
Sparta Prague	2022–23	Czech First League	32	5	3	0	1 (Note: Appearance(s) in UEFA Conference League)	0	—		36	5
Sparta Prague	2023–24	Czech First League	25	1	2	0	12 (Note: Two appearances in UEFA Champions League, ten appearances and one goal in UEFA Europa League)	1	—		39	2
Sparta Prague	2024–25	Czech First League	22	2	4	1	10 (Note: Appearances in UEFA Champions League)	1	—		36	4
Sparta Prague	2025–26	Czech First League	23	1	1	0	9	1	—		33	2
Sparta Prague	Total		102	9	10	1	32	3	—		144	13
Copenhagen	2026–27	Danish Superliga	9	1	1	0	1	0	—		11	1
Career total			295	19	21	2	34	3	0	0	350	24

== Honours ==
Red Bull Salzburg

- Austrian Bundesliga: 2014–15

Sparta Prague

- Czech First League: 2022–23, 2023–24
  - Best Defender
  - Best Foreign Player
- Czech Cup: 2023–24
