= William Clem =

Danish footballer (born 2004)

- Clem in 2026

Personal information
- Date of birth: 20 June 2004 (age 22)
- Place of birth: Vedbæk, Denmark
- Position: Defensive midfielder

Team information
- Current team: Copenhagen
- Number: 36

Youth career
- 2009–2016: BK Søllerød-Vedbæk
- 2016–2022: Copenhagen

Senior career*
| Years | Team | Apps | (Gls) |
| 2022– | Copenhagen | 88 | (2) |

International career^{‡}
| 2020 | Denmark U17 | 1 | (0) |
| 2021–2022 | Denmark U18 | 6 | (0) |
| 2022–2025 | Denmark U19 | 4 | (0) |
| 2025 | Denmark U20 | 5 | (0) |
| 2023– | Denmark U21 | 22 | (1) |
- * Club domestic league appearances and goals as of 26 October 2026 ‡ National team caps and goals as of 12:08, 21 November 2026 (UTC)

William Clem (born 20 June 2004) is a Danish professional footballer who plays as a defensive midfielder for Copenhagen.

== Club career ==
William Clem went through the youth ranks of FC Copenhagen, where he made his first bench appearances with the Superliga team during the 2021–22 Europa Conference while winning the Danish under-19 league. He signed his first professional the following summer.

Having played his first game for Copenhagen on the 19 October 2022, as a starter during the Cup penalty shootout win against Hobro IK, Clem made his Champions League debut less than a week later, starting the away group game to Sevilla. Despite staying in the game until the last minutes, the Danish team eventually conceded a 3–0 away loss, in a side with a record six teenagers starting the game.

== Career statistics ==
As of match played 29 October 2026

Appearances and goals by club, season and competition
| Club | Season | League | | | Cup | | Europe | | Other | | Total | |
| Club | Season | Division | Apps | Goals | Apps | Goals | Apps | Goals | Apps | Goals | Apps | Goals |
|---|---|---|---|---|---|---|---|---|---|---|---|---|
| Copenhagen | 2021–22 | Danish Superliga | 0 | 0 | 0 | 0 | 0 | 0 | 0 | 0 | 0 | 0 |
| Copenhagen | 2022–23 | Danish Superliga | 17 | 0 | 7 | 0 | 2 (Note: Appearances in UEFA Champions League) | 0 | 0 | 0 | 26 | 0 |
| Copenhagen | 2023–24 | Danish Superliga | 22 | 0 | 0 | 0 | 4 | 0 | 0 | 0 | 26 | 0 |
| Copenhagen | 2024–25 | Danish Superliga | 12 | 0 | 3 | 1 | 9 (Note: Appearances in UEFA Conference League) | 0 | — | | 24 | 1 |
| Copenhagen | 2025–26 | Danish Superliga | 25 | 2 | 6 | 1 | 11 | 0 | — | | 42 | 3 |
| Copenhagen | 2026–27 | Danish Superliga | 12 | 0 | 2 | 2 | 7 | 1 | — | | 21 | 3 |
| Career total | | | 88 | 2 | 18 | 4 | 33 | 1 | 0 | 0 | 139 | 7 |

== Honours ==
Copenhagen

- Danish Superliga: 2024–25
- Danish Cup: 2022–23, 2024–25
