= Marvin Nasnas =

Danish footballer

Personal information
- Date of birth: December 18, 2009 (age 16)
- Position: Midfielder

Team information
- Current team: F.C. Copenhagen
- Number: 34

Youth career
- 2013–2026: F.C. Copenhagen

Senior career*
Years	Team	Apps	(Gls)
2026–	F.C. Copenhagen	8	(1)

International career^{‡}
2024–2025	Denmark U16	7	(0)
2025–2026	Denmark U17	14	(1)
2025–	Denmark U18	3	(1)
- * Club domestic league appearances and goals as of 20:05, 11 October 2026 (UTC) ‡ National team caps and goals as of 00:32, 7 October 2026 (UTC)

Marvin Nasnas (born 18 December 2009) is a Danish professional footballer who plays as a midfielder for the Danish Superliga club F.C. Copenhagen.

== Career ==
Nasnas joined the youth academy of F.C. Copenhagen at the age of 3, and worked his way up their youth categories. On 8 January 2026, he extended his contract with the club for 3 years. On 23 July 2026, he made his senior debut with the club as a substitute in a 3–3 UEFA Conference League tie with FC Polissya Zhytomyr, become his club's fourth youngest debutant ever at 16 years and 217 days old. He was selected among The Guardian's 60 best young talents in world football selection for 2026.

== International career ==
Nasnas is a youth international for Denmark, and was called up to the Denmark U17s for the 2026 UEFA European Under-17 Championship.

== Career statsitics ==
=== Club ===
As of match played 15 October 2026

Appearances and goals by club, season and competition
Club	Season	League			Cup		Europe		Other		Total	
Club	Season	Division	Apps	Goals	Apps	Goals	Apps	Goals	Apps	Goals	Apps	Goals
Copenhagen	2026–27	Danish Superliga	8	1	1	0	6 (Note: Appearances in UEFA Conference League)	0	—		15	1
Career total			8	1	1	0	6	0	0	0	15	1
