= Rúnar Alex Rúnarsson =

Icelandic footballer (born 1995)

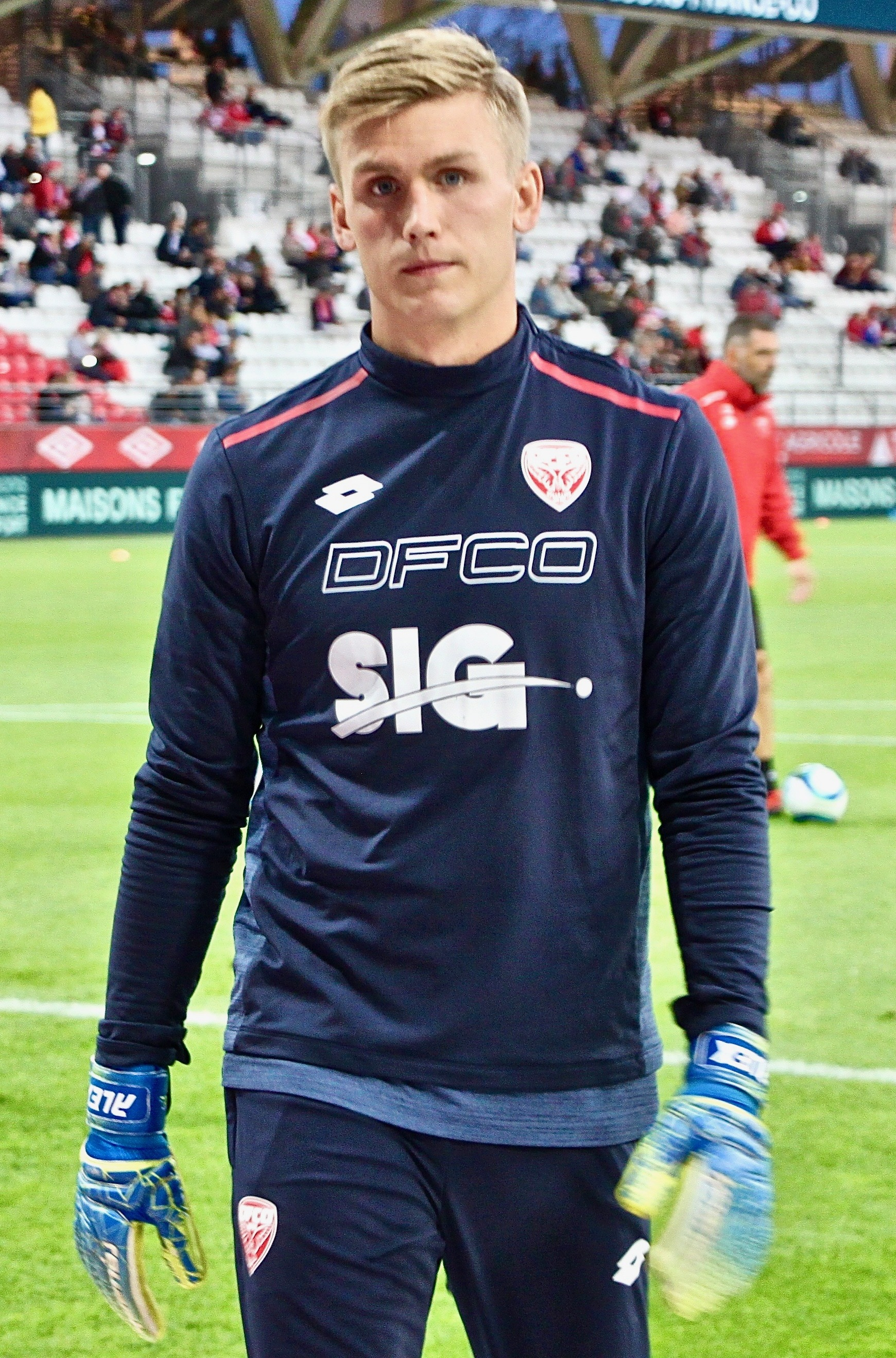
- Rúnarsson with Dijon in 2019

Personal information
- Full name: Rúnar Alex Rúnarsson
- Date of birth: 18 February 1995 (age 31)
- Place of birth: Reykjavík, Iceland
- Height: 1.86 m (6 ft 1 in)
- Position: Goalkeeper

Team information
- Current team: Copenhagen
- Number: 31

Youth career
- 2012–2013: KR Reykjavik

Senior career*
Years	Team	Apps	(Gls)
2013–2014	KR Reykjavik	3	(0)
2014–2018	Nordsjælland	60	(0)
2018–2020	Dijon	36	(0)
2020–2024	Arsenal	1	(0)
2021–2022	→ OH Leuven (loan)	18	(0)
2022–2023	→ Alanyaspor (loan)	30	(0)
2023–2024	→ Cardiff City (loan)	6	(0)
2024–	Copenhagen	4	(0)

International career
2011	Iceland U16	2	(0)
2012	Iceland U17	1	(0)
2012	Iceland U18	2	(0)
2012–2014	Iceland U19	9	(0)
2013–2016	Iceland U21	17	(0)
2017–2023	Iceland	27	(0)
- * Club domestic league appearances and goals as of 23 August 2026 (UTC)

Rúnar Alex Rúnarsson (born 18 February 1995) is an Icelandic professional footballer who plays as a goalkeeper for Danish Superliga club Copenhagen and the Iceland national team. He has also previously played for Dijon, Nordsjælland, KR Reykjavik and Arsenal.

== Family ==
Rúnar Alex is the son of Rúnar Kristinsson, a former professional footballer.

== Club career ==
Rúnar Alex was player of the season for FC Nordsjælland in the 2017–18 Danish Superliga. In June 2018, Rúnar Alex joined French side Dijon on a four-year agreement.

=== Arsenal ===
On 21 September 2020, Rúnar Alex signed for Premier League club Arsenal on a four-year deal. He chose the number 13 at the club. Rúnar Alex made his debut for the club on 29 October 2020, keeping a clean sheet in a 3–0 UEFA Europa League win over League of Ireland side Dundalk at the Emirates Stadium.

Arsenal faced Manchester City in the EFL Cup quarter-finals on 22 December. With the score at 1–1, Rúnar Alex let Riyad Mahrez's free kick slip through his arms to put Manchester City back in front. Arsenal lost the tie 4–1.

After first choice goalkeeper Bernd Leno was sent off against Wolverhampton Wanderers on 2 February 2021, Rúnar Alex made his Premier League debut as a substitute for Thomas Partey in a 2–1 away defeat.

==== Loan spells ====
On 31 August 2021, Rúnar Alex joined Belgian First Division A club OH Leuven on loan until the end of the season. On 27 October 2021, Rúnar Alex made his first appearance of the season for OH Leuven in their 2–1 Belgian Cup win over Lierse Kempenzonen, with his league debut coming one month later on 26 November 2021 in a 3–1 away win to league leaders Union SG.

On 15 August 2022, Arsenal announced that Rúnar Alex was loaned to Süper Lig side Alanyaspor.

On 18 August 2023, Rúnar Alex joined Championship side Cardiff City on a season long loan. He was recalled on 1 February 2024 to Arsenal, where he was released on a free by mutual termination.

=== Copenhagen ===
Rúnar Alex made the move to Danish side Copenhagen on 1 February 2024 via a free transfer.

== International career ==
Having previously represented his country at youth level, Rúnar Alex was called up to the senior Iceland squad for the 2017 China Cup, where the team became the silver medalist He earned his first senior cap in a friendly against the Czech Republic on 9 November 2017.

In May 2018, he was named in Iceland's 23-man squad for the 2018 FIFA World Cup in Russia.

== Career statistics ==
=== Club ===
As of match played 15 September 2026

Appearances and goals by club, season and competition
Club	Season	League			National Cup		League Cup		Europe		Other		Total	
Club	Season	Division	Apps	Goals	Apps	Goals	Apps	Goals	Apps	Goals	Apps	Goals	Apps	Goals
KR Reykjavik	2013	Úrvalsdeild	3	0	0	0	—		1 (Note: Appearance(s) in UEFA Europa League)	0	—		4	0
Nordsjælland	2013–14	Danish Superliga	0	0	0	0	—		—		—		0	0
Nordsjælland	2014–15	Danish Superliga	1	0	0	0	—		—		—		1	0
Nordsjælland	2015–16	Danish Superliga	3	0	0	0	—		—		—		3	0
Nordsjælland	2016–17	Danish Superliga	20	0	0	0	—		—		—		20	0
Nordsjælland	2017–18	Danish Superliga	36	0	0	0	—		—		—		36	0
Nordsjælland	Total		60	0	0	0	—		—		—		60	0
Dijon	2018–19	Ligue 1	25	0	4	0	1	0	—		1 (Note: Appearance(s) in Ligue 1 relegation play-offs)	0	31	0
Dijon	2019–20	Ligue 1	11	0	2	0	1	0	—		—		14	0
Dijon	Total		36	0	6	0	2	0	—		1	0	45	0
Arsenal	2020–21	Premier League	1	0	0	0	1	0	4	0	—		6	0
Arsenal	2021–22	Premier League	0	0	0	0	0	0	—		—		0	0
Arsenal	2022–23	Premier League	0	0	0	0	0	0	0	0	—		0	0
Arsenal	2023–24	Premier League	0	0	0	0	0	0	0	0	0	0	0	0
Arsenal	Total		1	0	0	0	1	0	4	0	0	0	6	0
OH Leuven (loan)	2021–22	Belgian Pro League	18	0	3	0	—		—		—		21	0
Alanyaspor (loan)	2022–23	Süper Lig	30	0	2	0	—		—		—		32	0
Cardiff City (loan)	2023–24	Championship	6	0	0	0	2	0	—		—		8	0
Copenhagen	2024–25	Danish Superliga	0	0	0	0	—		1 (Note: Appearances in UEFA Conference League)	0	—		1	0
Copenhagen	2025–26	Danish Superliga	2	0	1	0	—		—		—		3	0
Copenhagen	2026–27	Danish Superliga	2	0	1	0	—		2	0	—		5	0
Copenhagen	Total		4	0	2	0	—		3	0	—		9	0
Career total			159	0	13	0	5	0	8	0	1	0	185	0

=== International ===
Appearances and goals by national team and year
National team	Year	Apps	Goals
Iceland	2017	1	0
Iceland	2018	4	0
Iceland	2019	0	0
Iceland	2020	2	0
Iceland	2021	5	0
Iceland	2022	8	0
Iceland	2023	7	0
Total		27	0

== Honours ==
Copenhagen

- Danish Superliga: 2024–25
- Danish Cup: 2024–25
