= Junnosuke Suzuki =

Japanese footballer (born 2003)

- Suzuki in 2026

Personal information
- Date of birth: 12 July 2003 (age 23)
- Place of birth: Kakamigahara, Gifu, Japan
- Height: 1.80 m (5 ft 11 in)
- Positions: Centre-back; defensive midfielder

Team information
- Current team: Copenhagen
- Number: 20

Youth career
- FC Divine
- –2018: SC Gifu Vamos
- 2019–2021: Teikyo University Kani High School

Senior career*
Years	Team	Apps	(Gls)
2022–2025	Shonan Bellmare	49	(0)
2025–	Copenhagen	31	(2)

International career^{‡}
2025–	Japan	13	(0)
- * Club domestic league appearances and goals as of 18 October 2026 ‡ National team caps and goals as of 14 November 2026

Junnosuke Suzuki (鈴木 淳之介, Suzuki Junnosuke; born 12 July 2003) is a Japanese professional footballer who plays as a centre-back for Danish Superliga club Copenhagen and the Japan national team.

== Club career ==
=== High school football ===
After a year disrupted by the COVID-19 pandemic in Japan, Suzuki represented the Teikyo University Kani High School at the 2020 All Japan High School Soccer Tournament, where his performance in Teikyo's 2–0 win against Meitoku Gijuku helped his side to the Round-of-16 for the first time. The following year, he again impressed in helping Teikyo win the Gifu Prefecture National High School Football Championship, scoring the opening goal in the 6–1 win against Chukyo in the final. At the 2021 All Japan High School Soccer Tournament he provided two assists in Teikyo's 4–1 win against Imabari Higashi in the first round.

=== Shonan Bellmare ===
Having committed to sign for J1 League side Shonan Bellmare at the end of the 2020 season, Suzuki joined the club in 2022. He made his professional debut the same year, playing all ninety minutes in Shonan Bellmare's 3–0 win against Vertfee Yaita in the Emperor's Cup on 1 June 2022.

Having struggled to secure a place in the first team, making only five league appearances in the 2023 season, a change of position from defensive midfield to central defence saw Suzuki's playing time improve. Following a suspension after accumulating too many yellow cards, media in Japan cited Suzuki's absence for Shonan Bellmare's poor performance in a 1–1 draw with Avispa Fukuoka on 7 August 2024. He won the Young Player of the Month award for October 2024, having been credited with good performances, including in Shonan Bellmare's 2–1 win against Sanfrecce Hiroshima.

Suzuki renewed his contract with Shonan Bellmare at the conclusion of the 2024 season. Having featured mostly as a left centre-back in a back three for Shonan Bellmare, he showed adaptability when he was moved to the middle of the three for a game against Avispa Fukuoka in April 2025, helping Shonan Bellmare keep a clean sheet in a 0–0 draw. His good form continued, and by May 2025, he led the J1 League in ariel duels won.

=== FC Copenhagen ===
On 9 July 2025, Danish Superliga club F.C. Copenhagen announced the signing of Suzuki on a five-year deal.

== International career ==
Without having previously represented Japan at youth international level, he was called up to the senior squad in May 2025.

On 15 May 2026, Suzuki was selected in the 26-man squad for the 2026 FIFA World Cup.

== Style of play ==
Initially a defensive midfielder, he was noted during his high school years for his ability to read the game, as well as being able to play in both defensive and offensive capacities. Suzuki has described himself as a good passer with good dribbling, citing Frenkie de Jong and Andrés Iniesta as players he liked to watch.

Following an injury to Kim Min-tae, Suzuki was brought in to cover at centre-back for Shonan Bellmare's J1 League match against Gamba Osaka in June 2024. The change of position was beneficial for Suzuki, as in April 2025 he was named as the best centre-back under 25 years old in the J1 League by the International Centre for Sports Studies.

== Career statistics ==
=== Club ===
As of match played 29 October 2026

Appearances and goals by club, season and competition
Club	Season	League			National cup (Note: Includes Emperor's Cup, Danish Cup)		League cup (Note: Includes J.League Cup)		Continental		Other		Total	
Club	Season	Division	Apps	Goals	Apps	Goals	Apps	Goals	Apps	Goals	Apps	Goals	Apps	Goals
Shonan Bellmare	2022	J1 League	0	0	1	0	0	0	—		—		1	0
Shonan Bellmare	2023	J1 League	5	0	2	0	3	0	—		—		10	0
Shonan Bellmare	2024	J1 League	23	0	2	0	0	0	—		—		25	0
Shonan Bellmare	2025	J1 League	21	0	0	0	3	0	—		—		24	0
Shonan Bellmare	Total		49	0	5	0	6	0	0	0	0	0	60	0
Copenhagen	2025–26	Danish Superliga	21	2	7	0	—		7 (Note: Appearances in UEFA Champions League)	0	1 (Note: Appearance in Danish Superliga European play-off)	0	36	2
Copenhagen	2026–27	Danish Superliga	10	0	2	0	—		7 (Note: Appearances in UEFA Conference League)	0	—		19	0
Copenhagen	Total		31	2	9	0	—		14	0	1	0	55	2
Career total			80	2	14	0	8	0	14	0	1	0	117	2

=== International ===
As of match played 14 November 2026

Appearances and goals by national team and year
National team	Year	Apps	Goals
Japan	2025	4	0
Japan	2026	9	0
Total		13	0
