= Geovanni Ndjee =

Cameroonian footballer (born 2007)

Personal information
- Full name: Geovanni Vianney Aboh Ndjee
- Date of birth: 25 September 2007 (age 19)
- Place of birth: Cameroon
- Height: 1.88 m (6 ft 2 in)
- Position: Forward

Team information
- Current team: Copenhagen
- Number: 44

Youth career
- –2025: Kadji Sport Academy
- 2025–2026: Copenhagen

Senior career*
Years	Team	Apps	(Gls)
2026–	Copenhagen	18	(2)

International career^{‡}
2026–	Cameroon	1	(0)
- * Club domestic league appearances and goals as of 18 October 2026 ‡ National team caps and goals as of 16 November 2026

Geovanni Vianney Aboh Ndjee (born 25 September 2007) is a Cameroonian professional footballer who plays as a forward for Danish Superliga club Copenhagen and the Cameroon national team.

== Club career ==
=== F.C. Copenhagen ===
Ndjee joined Danish club F.C. Copenhagen from Cameroonian academy Kadji Sport Academy in January 2026. He initially joined the club's under-19 squad while also training regularly with the first team.

He made his first-team debut on 8 February 2026, appearing as a substitute in a 2–1 Danish Superliga defeat against FC Midtjylland.

In April 2026, Ndjee was permanently promoted to F.C. Copenhagen's first-team squad after making six appearances for the club.

Ndjee scored his first senior goals on 19 April 2026, scoring twice in a 4–1 away victory against Vejle Boldklub in the Danish Superliga.

== International career ==
Ndjee made his debut for the Cameroon national team on 12 November 2026 in an AFCON qualifier against Namibia.

== Career statistics ==
=== Club ===
As of match played 29 October 2026

Appearances by club, season and competition
Club	Season	League			Cup		Europe		Other		Total	
Club	Season	Division	Apps	Goals	Apps	Goals	Apps	Goals	Apps	Goals	Apps	Goals
F.C. Copenhagen	2025–26	Danish Superliga	10	2	1	0	—		—		11	2
F.C. Copenhagen	2026–27	Danish Superliga	8	0	2	1	4 (Note: Appearances in UEFA Conference League)	0	—		14	1
Career total			18	2	3	1	4	0	0	0	25	3
