= Mads Emil Madsen =

Danish footballer (born 1998)

Personal information
- Full name: Mads Emil Møller Madsen
- Date of birth: 14 January 1998 (age 28)
- Place of birth: Gammel Rye, Denmark
- Height: 1.86 m (6 ft 1 in)
- Position: Midfielder

Team information
- Current team: Copenhagen
- Number: 21

Youth career
- 2003–2011: Gl. Rye IF
- 2011–2017: Silkeborg

Senior career*
Years	Team	Apps	(Gls)
2016–2020	Silkeborg	63	(3)
2020–2021	LASK	24	(0)
2021–2022	Slavia Prague	12	(0)
2022–2025	AGF	85	(11)
2025–	Copenhagen	32	(5)

International career
2016	Denmark U18	2	(0)
2016	Denmark U19	2	(0)
2019–2020	Denmark U21	7	(0)
- * Club domestic league appearances and goals as of 26 October 2026

Mads Emil Møller Madsen (born 14 January 1998) is a Danish professional footballer who plays as a midfielder for Danish Superliga club F.C. Copenhagen.

== Club career ==
=== Silkeborg ===
==== Early years ====
Madsen discovered football on a vacation in Sweden at age 4, and shortly afterwards began playing for Gl. Rye IF in his hometown, where the team was coached by his father. At the age of 13, Madsen joined Silkeborg, the major team in the area. He was admitted to the Talent Team of Silkeborg and after graduating from elementary school, he joined Silkeborg Football College.

==== First team ====
In October 2016, Madsen signed his first professional contract with the club; a four-year deal. Alongside the new contract, he was promoted to the first-team squad in the summer 2017, and become a full-time professional.

On 10 October 2016, Madsen made his debut for Silkeborg at the age of 18. Madsen started on the bench and replaced Sammy Skytte in the 87th minute in a 1–1 draw against Lyngby. He made his first start in 0–5 defeat against AaB in the Danish Cup on 2 March 2017. Madsen made three appearances during the 2017–18 season. However, he suffered relegation with Silkeborg at the end of the season after play-offs against Esbjerg fB.

In March 2019, he scored his first goal for Silkeborg and his first goal in the second-tier 1st Division in a 4–2 win over HB Køge. In the 2018–19 season, he made 28 appearances in the 1st Division, in which he scored one goal. As winners of the second tier, Madsen and Silkeborg were able to accomplish promotion back to the Danish Superliga.

In February 2020, Madsen was appointed team captain of Silkeborg at the age of 22.

=== LASK ===
On 29 June 2020, Austrian Bundesliga club LASK announced his signing on a four-year contract until 2024. He made his debut on 29 August in the first round of the Austrian Cup in a 0–3 win over ASV Siegendorf. His debut in the Austrian Bundesliga came less than a month later, on 19 September in a 1–1 away draw against WSG Swarovski Tirol where he came on as a second-half substitute for James Holland. The following month, Madsen made his first start for the club in the cup match against SV Wörgl. The match ended in a 3–0 win for LASK, and Madsen played the full game.

On 26 November, Madsen made his first European appearance in the group stage of the 2020–21 UEFA Europa League, playing as a starter in the 0–2 home loss to Royal Antwerp. He would also score his first goal for LASK in Europe, helping secure a 3–1 away win over Ludogorets on 10 December. LASK finished third in the group, and were knocked out of European contention. He finished the first half of the season with 15 appearances for the club and one goal, and played convincingly in all three competitions.

=== Slavia Prague ===
On 5 June 2021, Madsen signed a four-and-a-half-year deal with Czech First League club Slavia Prague. He got his debut for the club on 14 August 2021 against Mladá Boleslav.

=== AGF ===
On 1 July 2022, Madsen returned to his homeland, as he signed a deal until the end of 2026 with Danish Superliga club AGF.

After a great start to the 2024–25 season with goals and assists, Madsen was named player of the month in the Danish Superliga in August.

=== Copenhagen ===
On 1 September 2025, Danish Superliga club F.C. Copenhagen signed Madsen on the last day of the fall transfer window. Madsen joins the defending double-winning club with the team sitting in first place in the Superliga and preparing to start league play in the 2025-26 UEFA Champions League

== International career ==
Madsen made two appearances for the Denmark under-18 team in May 2016. In October 2016, he played two games for the under-19 team. In September 2019, he made his debut against Hungary at under-21 level.

== Personal life ==
In January 2025, Madsen, along with his two former teammates Gustav Dahl and Bastian Skibsted, launched a new podcast named 'Fantasy League', where they provided advice on manager games related to cycling and football.

== Career statistics ==
=== Club ===
As of match played 29 October 2026

Club	Season	League			Cup (Note: Includes Danish Cup, Austrian Cup and Czech Cup)		Continental		Other		Total	
Club	Season	Division	Apps	Goals	Apps	Goals	Apps	Goals	Apps	Goals	Apps	Goals
Silkeborg	2016–17	Superliga	2	0	2	0	—		—		4	0
Silkeborg	2017–18	Superliga	3	0	0	0	—		—		3	0
Silkeborg	2018–19	1st Division	28	1	2	0	—		—		30	1
Silkeborg	2019–20	Superliga	30	2	2	1	—		—		32	3
Silkeborg	Total		63	3	6	1	—		—		69	4
LASK	2020–21	Austrian Bundesliga	24	0	5	0	3 (Note: Appearances in the UEFA Europa League)	1	—		32	1
Slavia Prague	2021–22	Czech First League	12	0	3	1	2 (Note: Appearances in the UEFA Europa Conference League)	0	—		17	1
AGF	2022–23	Superliga	27	3	3	0	—		—		30	3
AGF	2023–24	Superliga	20	3	4	0	2	0	—		26	3
AGF	2024–25	Superliga	31	5	4	1	—		—		35	6
AGF	2025–26	Superliga	7	0	0	0	—		—		7	0
AGF	Total		85	12	12	1	2	0	—		98	13
Copenhagen	2025–26	Superliga	23	3	7	0	7 (Note: Appearances in UEFA Champions League)	0	—		37	3
Copenhagen	2026–27	Superliga	9	2	1	0	7	2	—		17	4
Copenhagen	Total		32	5	8	0	14	2	—		54	7
Career total			216	20	33	3	21	3	0	0	270	26

== Honours ==
Individual

- Danish Superliga Player of the Month: July 2024
