= Gustav Dahl =

Danish footballer (born 1996)

Personal information
- Full name: Gustav Klitgård Dahl
- Date of birth: 21 January 1996 (age 30)
- Place of birth: Silkeborg, Denmark
- Position: Midfielder

Youth career
- Mariehøj IF
- Silkeborg IF

Senior career*
| Years | Team | Apps | (Gls) |
| 2015–2023 | Silkeborg IF | 58 | (0) |
- * Club domestic league appearances and goals

Gustav Klitgård Dahl (born 21 January 1996) is a Danish retired footballer, who played as a midfielder.

== Club career ==
=== Silkeborg IF ===
Dahl comes from the football school of Silkeborg IF. He signed his first professional contract in the summer 2014.

His official debut was on 31 May 2015, when he replaced Adeola Runsewe in the 82nd minute of a game against AaB, which Silkeborg lost 1–2.

Dahl was out for nearly nine months, starting in August 2017, after undergoing two hip surgeries. He returned in April 2018, but was injured again at the beginning of the 2018/19 season.

In February 2019, Dahl went out to the media and said that his hip injuries might prevent his ever playing again. On May 26, 2023, Silkeborg confirmed that he was retiring due to a severe concussion.

In an interview in April 2025, Dahl stated that he retired due to suffering from long-term effects resulting from a concussion he sustained half a year before his retirement, which was still severely affecting him.

== Personal life ==
In January 2025, Dahl, along with his two former teammates Mads Emil Madsen and Bastian Skibsted, launched a new podcast named 'Fantasy League', where they provided advice on manager games related to cycling and football.

In December 2025, it was reported that Dahl had entered into a relationship with the female Danish handball star, Emma Friis.
