= Robert Silva (footballer) =

Brazilian footballer (born 2005)

Personal information
- Full name: Robert Vinicius Rodrigues Silva
- Date of birth: 13 April 2005 (age 21)
- Place of birth: Pirapora, Brazil
- Position: Forward

Team information
- Current team: Copenhagen
- Number: 16

Youth career
- 2016–2023: Cruzeiro

Senior career*
Years	Team	Apps	(Gls)
2023–2025	Cruzeiro	33	(2)
2024–2025	→ Copenhagen (loan)	8	(2)
2025–	Copenhagen	42	(6)
- * Club domestic league appearances and goals as of 26 October 2026

Robert Vinicius Rodrigues Silva (born 13 April 2005), sometimes known as just Robert, is a Brazilian footballer who plays as a forward for F.C. Copenhagen.

== Career ==
=== Cruzeiro ===
Born in Pirapora, Minas Gerais, Robert Silva joined Cruzeiro's youth setup at the age of 11. On 25 May 2021, he signed his first professional contract with the club.

On 9 June 2023, Robert Silva renewed his contract with the Raposa until 2027. He made his professional – and Série A – debut on 8 July, coming on as a second-half substitute for fellow youth graduate Stênio in a 1–0 away win over Vasco da Gama.

=== FC Copenhagen ===
On 6 August 24, Robert Silva joined FC Copenhagen from Cruzeiro on a season-long loan with an option to buy.

He made his competitive debut for the club on 22 August 2024, coming on as a second-half substitute in a 2–0 victory over Kilmarnock FC in Europa Conference League qualifying. Robert's first league appearance came in a 3–2 defeat to FC Nordsjaelland on 25 August, in which he provided his first assist for the Lions.

In his first league start, on 18 October, Robert provided two assists in a 3–1 win against Vejle, and was named man of the match. In his third league start, Robert scored his first goal for Copenhagen on 24 November, opening the scoring in a 2–1 victory over Lyngby.

At the end of the loan period, Copenhagen purchased Robert on 20 January 2025.

== Career statistics ==
As of match played 26 October 2026

Appearances and goals by club, season and competition
Club	Season	League			State League		Cup		Continental		Other		Total	
Club	Season	Division	Apps	Goals	Apps	Goals	Apps	Goals	Apps	Goals	Apps	Goals	Apps	Goals
Cruzeiro	2023	Série A	9	1	5	1	—		—		—		14	2
Cruzeiro	2024	Série A	12	0	7	0	0	0	2 (Note: Appearances in Copa Sudamericana)	0	—		21	0
Cruzeiro	Total		21	1	12	1	0	0	2	0	—		35	2
Copenhagen (loan)	2024–25	Danish Superliga	8	2	—		3	1	6 (Note: Appearance(s) in UEFA Conference League)	0	—		17	3
Copenhagen	2024–25	Danish Superliga	6	0	—		3	0	4	0	—		13	0
Copenhagen	2025–26	Danish Superliga	24	4	—		4	0	11 (Note: Appearance(s) in UEFA Champions League)	4	0	0	39	8
Copenhagen	2026–27	Danish Superliga	12	2	—		0	0	8	4	—		20	6
Copenhagen	Total		42	6	—		7	0	23	8	0	0	72	14
Career total			71	9	12	1	9	1	32	8	0	0	124	19

== Honours ==
Copenhagen

- Danish Superliga: 2024–25
- Danish Cup: 2024–25
