= Kenay Myrie =

Costa Rican football player (born 1995)

Personal information
- Full name: Kenay Myrie Reyes
- Date of birth: 6 September 2006 (age 20)
- Place of birth: Alajuela, Costa Rica
- Height: 1.88 m (6 ft 2 in)
- Position: Right-back

Team information
- Current team: Copenhagen
- Number: 18

Youth career
- 2024: Saprissa

Senior career*
Years	Team	Apps	(Gls)
2025–2026	Saprissa	49	(5)
2026–	Copenhagen	2	(0)

International career^{‡}
2024	Costa Rica U20	1	(0)
2025–	Costa Rica	5	(0)
- * Club domestic league appearances and goals as of 18:03, 22 March 2026 (UTC) ‡ National team caps and goals as of 23:12, 9 September 2025 (UTC)

Kenay Myrie Reyes (born 6 September 2006) is a Costa Rican football player who plays as right-back for Danish Superliga club F.C. Copenhagen, and the Costa Rica national team.

== Career ==
A youth product of Alajuelense, Myrie moved to the academy of Saprissa and began training with their senior team in 2023. He debuted with Saprissa in a Liga FPD match with Santos de Guápiles in September 2024. On 13 December 2024, he signed a professional contract with Saprissa until 2028.

On 16 January 2026, Myrie joined Danish Superliga club F.C. Copenhagen. However, the club did not disclose the length of the agreement.

== International career ==
Myrie was called up to the Costa Rica U20s in November 2024 for a friendly. He debuted with Costa Rica national team in a 8–0 2026 FIFA World Cup qualification win over Bahamas on 8 June 2025. He made the final Costa Rica squad for the 2025 CONCACAF Gold Cup.

== Personal life ==
Kenay is the son of Roy Myrie and nephew of David Myrie, both Costa Rican former international footballers. His twin brother Kenan is currently a youth footballer with Saprissa.

== Career statistics ==
As of match played 15 September 2026

Appearances and goals by club, season and competition
Club	Season	League			National Cup		Continental		Other		Total	
Club	Season	Division	Apps	Goals	Apps	Goals	Apps	Goals	Apps	Goals	Apps	Goals
Saprissa	2024–25	Liga FPD	33	1	1	0	0	0	0	0	34	1
Saprissa	2025–26	Liga FPD	16	4	0	0	0	0	3 (Note: Appearances in Central American Cup)	0	19	4
Saprissa	Total		49	5	1	0	0	0	3	0	53	5
Copenhagen	2025–26	Danish Superliga	2	0	0	0	—		—		2	0
Copenhagen	2026–27	Danish Superliga	0	0	1	0	0	0	—		1	0
Copenhagen	Total		2	0	1	0	0	0	—		3	0
Career total			51	5	2	0	0	0	3	0	56	5

=== International ===
As of match played 9 September 2025

Appearances and goals by national team and year
National team	Year	Apps	Goals
Costa Rica	2025	5	0
Total		5	0
