= Mihailo Ristić =

Mihailo Ristić may refer to:

- Mihailo Ristić-Džervinac (1854–1916), Serbian officer and conspirator of the May Coup
- Mihailo Ristić (diplomat) (1864–1925), Serbian diplomat and counsel
- Mihailo Ristić (footballer) (born 1995), Serbian footballer
