= Pachanga Kristensen =

Danish footballer (born 2006)

Personal information
- Full name: Pachanga Cassoma Kristensen
- Date of birth: 7 December 2006 (age 19)
- Place of birth: Denmark
- Height: 1.87 m (6 ft 2 in)
- Position: Centre-back

Team information
- Current team: Sønderjyske
- Number: 19

Youth career
- AB
- –2021: GVI
- 2021–2023: AB

Senior career*
Years	Team	Apps	(Gls)
2023–2025	AB	32	(0)
2025–	Sønderjyske	12	(0)
- * Club domestic league appearances and goals as of 19 May 2026

Pachanga Cassoma Kristensen (born 7 December 2006) is a Danish footballer who plays as a centre-back for Danish Superliga club Sønderjyske.

== Club career ==
=== AB ===
Kristensen started at AB at the age of six and has since played for various clubs before returning to the club in July 2021 after a spell at GVI. Here, he worked his way up through the club's academy.

In the summer of 2023, the 16-year-old Kristensen was selected for AB's first-team squad that was heading to a training camp in Hamburg. Shortly after the start of the season, on August 9, 2023, Kristensen made his debut in a Danish Cup match against Ledøje-Smørum. In September 2023, he was permanently promoted to the first-team squad.

Despite his young age, Kristensen made numerous appearances for the club's Danish 2nd Division team, which led to a contract extension in August 2024 and later a trial with the English club, Burnley, in February 2025.

=== Sønderjyske ===
On 5 July 2025, Kristensen joined Danish Superliga club Sønderjyske on a deal until June 2029. On August 3, 2025, Kristensen made his official debut for Sønderjyske when he was substituted in for the final minutes of a match against FC Nordsjælland.
