= F.C. Copenhagen =

Professional football club in Copenhagen, Denmark

Copenhagen
- Full name: Football Club København
- Nicknames: Byens Hold (The Team of the City); Løverne (The Lions)
- Short name: FCK; Copenhagen
- Founded: 1 July 1992; 34 years ago
- Stadium: Parken Stadium
- Capacity: 38,065
- Owner: Parken Sport & Entertainment A/S
- Chairman: Henrik Møgelmose
- Head coach: Bo Svensson
- League: Superliga
- 2025–26: Superliga, 7th of 12
- Website: fck.dk
Home colours	Away colours	Third colours

Football Club Copenhagen (Danish: Football Club København, pronounced [kʰøpm̩ˈhɑwˀn]), commonly known as F.C. København, F.C. Copenhagen, Copenhagen, or simply FCK, is a Danish professional football club based in Østerbro, Copenhagen. FCK was founded in 1992 as a superstructure on top of Kjøbenhavns Boldklub and Boldklubben 1903.

F.C. Copenhagen has won a record 16 Danish Football Championships and a record 10 Danish Cups. In European football F.C. Copenhagen has reached the group stage of the UEFA Champions League and the group stage of the UEFA Europa League more times than any other Danish club.

Copenhagen plays its matches at the Parken Stadium, which also serves as the venue for Denmark national football team matches. Since their foundation, FCK have developed a fierce rivalry with Brøndby IF. The Copenhagen Derby games between the two sides have attracted some of the biggest crowds in Danish football history.

== History ==
=== Early success ===
Football Club Copenhagen is, in many ways, both an old and a new club. Even though the club was established in 1992, it is rooted in more than 100 years of club tradition. The club's first team represents two separate clubs: Kjøbenhavns Boldklub (continental Europe's oldest football club) founded in 1876 and Boldklubben 1903 founded in 1903. Due to financial difficulties throughout the clubs in the Copenhagen area in the 1980s and with Kjøbenhavns Boldklub on the verge of bankruptcy, the two old Copenhagen clubs got together and established the superstructure which is F.C. Copenhagen. Copenhagen used B1903's club license to play in the Danish Superliga championship, while Kjøbenhavns Boldklub became the official reserve team of the club. With the rebuilding of the Parken Stadium, Denmark's national team stadium, the new club had a modern stadium to play at from the beginning. The initial ambition of the club was continually to qualify for one of the European competitions each season. To reach this goal, the club needed a solid economy, a relatively big fan base and an "attractive and positive style of football."

Benny Johansen managed the club and started its maiden season well. FCK made its first appearance in the European tournaments when it beat Swiss team Grasshoppers 2–1 in the 1992 UEFA Intertoto Cup. FCK won the Intertoto Cup that year and thereby qualified for the UEFA Cup, where it was eliminated in the second round by French team Auxerre. The club's first trophy was the 1992–93 Superliga title, their debut league campaign. For the 1993–94 Superliga season, expectations were high. The season opened with a 0–6 thrashing at the hands of Italian team Milan in the 1993–94 Champions League qualifiers. FCK went on winter break after the first half of the Superliga season in third place. In the spring of 1994, Copenhagen gained on leading team Silkeborg. In the penultimate match of the season, the two teams met at the Parken Stadium. In front of a record-setting attendance of 26,679, FCK won the match 4–1. The club was one point ahead of Silkeborg, but because FCK lost 3–2 to Odense in the final game of the season, it had to settle for second place.

=== Years of underachievement ===
For the next three seasons, Copenhagen had little success in the Superliga, despite winning two Danish Cups. The team won the 1995 Cup final against Akademisk Boldklub with a 5–0 win, qualifying for European football once again, despite mediocre results in the league. Kim Brink took over as manager in 1996, but despite winning the second Cup trophy for the club, the eighth-place finish in the 1996–97 Superliga season prompted another change in managers.

=== Flemming Østergaard joins the board ===
In February 1997, Flemming Østergaard, later given the nickname "Don Ø," joined the board of the club as vice chairman and CEO. After a successful IPO, generating DKK 75 million, FCK was introduced on the Copenhagen Stock Exchange in November 1997. The 1997–98 season marked the first season that Copenhagen averaged more than 10,000 spectators at home, and the club bought their stadium Parken for DKK 138 million in June 1998. The self-acclaimed "best manager in Denmark," Christian Andersen, began managing the club in January 1999. After 75 controversial days, however, he was fired in March 1999; Sports Director Niels-Christian Holmstrøm explained Andersen had created frustration among the players.

In 1999, Copenhagen made its impact in Europe when it faced English side Chelsea in the second round UEFA Cup Winners' Cup. In the first leg away at Stamford Bridge, Bjarne Goldbæk gave Copenhagen the lead nine minutes before the end of the match, but Chelsea scored in the last minute of the game. Chelsea later won the second game at Parken with a goal by the Dane Brian Laudrup, knocking out FCK. At the post-match press conference, it was announced that Chelsea's Brian Laudrup was signing with Copenhagen in January 1999, with Bjarne Goldbæk moving in the other direction for Chelsea. Laudrup, a four-time Danish Player of the Year award winner, however, could not help Copenhagen improve their league position, and the club ended the year in seventh in the 1998–99 Superliga season. Laudrup only stayed for six months at the club before signing for Ajax at the end of the season. In the 1999–2000 season, F.C. Copenhagen struggled to make any significant impact and finished eighth in the league.

=== Champions again ===
In the winter 2000 transfer window, South African striker Sibusiso Zuma was signed from South African side Orlando Pirates, and in May 2000, English manager Roy Hodgson became the new manager. From the 2000–01 season, the club started to improve. The club won its second Superliga championship, winning 3–1 in the last Copenhagen Derby match of the season. One of the goals scored in this match, a bicycle kick by Zuma, was later voted the Danish goal of the year, was voted the best Superliga goal of the decade in December 2009, and in 2013 voted as the greatest moment in the history of FCK. Roy Hodgson broke his contract with Copenhagen a few weeks after having won the championship, signing with Italian team Udinese, and he was replaced by Swede Kent Karlsson. The 2001 season is also remembered for a highly dramatic event. During training on 13 March 2001 charismatic midfielder Ståle Solbakken suffered a heart attack. He was rapidly attended to by club doctor Frank Odgaard who found that his heart had stopped beating and started to administer cardiac massage. Upon the ambulance's arrival, Solbakken was pronounced clinically dead at the scene, but on the way to the hospital in the ambulance he was revived nearly seven minutes later. He survived the episode and had a pacemaker fitted. Shortly after, on medical advice, he announced his playing retirement, but would later return to the club and become its most successful manager.

Copenhagen faced Italian team Lazio for qualification to the 2001–02 Champions League. A 2–1 win for FCK in the first game proved moot, as Lazio ultimately progressed with a 5–3 aggregate score. Copenhagen thus entered the 2001–02 UEFA Cup, where it defeated Dutch giants Ajax 1–0 on a goal from left back Niclas Jensen. In the next round, German powerhouse Borussia Dortmund eliminated Copenhagen. The 2001–02 Superliga season also ended in disappointment for the club, as Brøndby won the championship on goal difference after FCK had caught up with Brøndby's ten-point lead after the first half of the season. In the second-last round of the 2002–03 Superliga season, FCK faced Brøndby at Brøndby Stadium. In extra time, Hjalte Nørregaard scored his first goal for Copenhagen and brought the championship back to Parken for the club's third ever league title.

In the Champions League second qualifying round in 2004–05, FCK won the first match against Slovenian club ND Gorica 2–1, but later lost at Parken 0–5. Under Backe, Copenhagen went on to win the 2004 and 2006 Danish championships and the 2004 Danish Cup. Copenhagen also won the inaugural 2004–05 edition of the Royal League tournament, beating Swedish team IFK Göteborg on penalty shootout in the 2005 final. Copenhagen repeated the achievement in the 2006 edition of the tournament, this time beating Norwegian team Lillestrøm SK 1–0 in the 2006 final. Backe became the longest-serving coach for FCK before leaving the club in December 2005. Former Copenhagen player Ståle Solbakken took over as manager.

=== European ambitions ===
For the 2006–07 season, Danish national team player Jesper Grønkjær reinforced Copenhagen. FCK looked forward to the 2006–07 Champions League qualifiers, where it beat Ajax. For the first time in the club's history, FCK entered the group stage of the Champions League, being grouped with Celtic, Benfica and Manchester United, all former winners of the trophy. Despite not losing a game at Parken (Benfica 0–0, Manchester United 1–0 and Celtic 3–1), FCK failed to qualify from the Champions League group stage after losing all of its away games. On 9 May, Copenhagen defeated Brøndby 1–0 and won its fifth Danish championship in seven years with four games to spare in the league.

In the 2007–08 season, Copenhagen lost the third qualification round of the Champions League with a 1–3 aggregate score to Benfica. After beating Lens 3–2, FCK qualified for the group stages of the 2007–08 UEFA Cup, where it played Panathinaikos (H), Lokomotiv Moscow (A), Atlético Madrid (H) and Aberdeen. Copenhagen fell to Panathinaikos and Atlético, but a win against Lokomotiv meant that the club needed only a draw against Aberdeen to qualify for the next round. However, a 0–4 defeat to Aberdeen put them out of the tournament. In the 2007–08 Superliga season, Copenhagen finished third, with AaB taking the title.

In the 2008–09 season, Copenhagen began strong. The team qualified for the 2008–09 UEFA Cup group stage by eliminating Cliftonville, Lillestrøm and FC Moscow. In the group, FCK lost at home to Saint-Étienne and drew 1–1 against Valencia. With a 1–1 draw against Rosenborg and a win over Club Brugge, Copenhagen qualified for the knockout phase of the competition, where it drew 2–2 in the first leg of the round of 32 against Manchester City on 19 February 2009. The club lost 1–2 in the second leg, and were eliminated, but not in disappointment as the club had gone far in the competition. In the domestic league, FCK battled for first place with Brøndby and Odense. Eventually, Copenhagen won the Cup final against AaB and claimed the league title with one game to spare in the tournament, thus securing the Double for the second time in the club's history. 2010 proved to be yet another European success. Even though the team lost the 2009–10 Champions League playoff match to APOEL with a 2–3 aggregate loss, the team had already qualified to the 2009–10 Europa League group stage by eliminating FK Mogren and Stabæk. With two victories over Sparta Prague, (1–0 at home, 3–0 away and a victory at home against Romanian club CFR Cluj, Copenhagen qualified for the round of 32 to face Marseille. The match-up, however, resulted in two 1–3 losses for Copenhagen, thus eliminating them from the competition.

The team's qualification to the 2010–11 Champions League was secured after beating BATE Borisov (0–0 / 3–2) and Rosenborg (1–2 / 1–0). The team thus entered the group stage in Group D and met Barcelona, Panathinaikos and Rubin Kazan. After a 3–1 win against Panathinaikos in their last group stage match, they qualified for the round of 16—thereby becoming the first-ever Danish club to reach the stage in the Champions League—where Chelsea defeated them, although keeping a clean sheet at Stamford Bridge.

=== Solbakken returns ===
Copenhagen won the 2012–13 Danish Superliga to secure a direct place in the group stage of the 2013–14 Champions League. However, after a horrific start to the 2013–14 Danish Superliga season, FCK fired manager Ariël Jacobs, rehiring Ståle Solbakken as his replacement. Solbakken was given a two-year contract with the option for a further two-year extension. In the Champions League, the club was placed into Group B alongside Real Madrid, Juventus and Galatasaray. FCK secured four points by drawing 1–1 against Juventus at home and winning 1–0 at home over Galatasaray after a great goal by Daniel Braaten. The club, however, conceded its first-ever Champions League group stage home defeat after falling 0–2 to Real Madrid in the last round of the group stage.

Copenhagen finished the 2013–14 league in second place, despite having been situated third for numerous weeks. A 3–2 away win against FC Midtjylland saw them closing in on the second place. In the last round of the league, FCK beat Odense Boldklub 3–2 at home whilst Midtjylland lost their game 3–1, ensuring Copenhagen's seizure of second place and its subsequent spot in the qualifying round of the 2014–15 Champions League. Copenhagen was drawn against Ukrainian outfit Dnipro Dnipropetrovsk in the third qualifying round. After an aggregate victory of 2–0 over Dnipro, Copenhagen was drawn against German club Bayer Leverkusen in the play-off round. The Germans, however, defeated Copenhagen 7–2 aggregate, dropping Copenhagen to contention in the 2014–15 Europa League. In the Europa League, Copenhagen finished last in its group with one win one draw and four losses. The 2014–15 season ended with Copenhagen winning the Danish Cup and finishing second in the Superliga.

The 2015–16 season began with FCK bringing in six new players, most notably Danish international and former AaB player Kasper Kusk. By placing second in 2014–15, Copenhagen began in the second qualifying round of the 2015–16 UEFA Europa League, where they were drawn against Welsh club Newtown, defeating them 5–1 on aggregate to qualify them for the next round against Czech outfit Baumit Jablonec. The opening game of the 2015–16 Danish Superliga ended in a 2–1 away win for FCK against Esbjerg fB through goals from Marvin Pourié and Nicolai Jørgensen. Despite a 0–1 away win over Baumit Jablonec, Copenhagen lost its home game 2–3, resulting in a 3–3 aggregate loss on the away goals rule. This marked the first time in ten years that Copenhagen failed to qualify for either the Champions League or Europa League. On 5 May, the Danish Cup was won, after a 2–1 win Over AGF, with goals from Nicolai Jørgensen and William Kvist.

After winning the title the previous season, Copenhagen would compete in the 2016–17 Champions League qualifiers. In the playoff round they met APOEL, and was faced with the challenge on getting revenge after their tie against them in 2009. The first leg at Parken stadium ended 1–0 to the home team, and in the second leg, Copenhagen equalised in the 86th minute via Federico Santander's shot from a wide angle, qualifying for the group stage, with an aggregate score of 2–1. Copenhagen were subsequently placed in a group with Leicester City, Porto and Club Brügge. They would after 2 wins, 1 loss and 3 draws, finish 3rd in their group and move on to the 2016–17 Europa League Round of 32 where they met Ludogorets, whom they beat 2–1 on aggregate. In the round of 16, they met Ajax. In the first leg at home, Copenhagen won 2–1. The away leg finished 2–0 to Ajax, and Copenhagen were knocked out of the tournament, with that seasons achievements in the Europa League being their best finish in the competition at the time. Domestically, the season was another season to enjoy for fans of the club. Copenhagen won the league with the closest competition, Brøndby, finishing 24 points behind them. At the time they were crowned champions, following a draw against FC Nordsjælland they were unbeaten in the league, with their first loss of the season coming against FC Midtjylland 2 rounds later, and subsequently another loss against Lyngby BK the round right after. Copenhagen also reached the cup final, where they met arch-rivals Brøndby. With the match at 1–1, Copenhagen secured the win with two goals in rapid succession, in the 83rd and 85th minutes, scored by Santander and Cornelius respectively, thus resulting in the club from the capital winning their third consecutive cup final, along with their second consecutive domestic double.

In September 2019, the club announced that it would change its name in European competitions and would subsequently be known as F.C. Copenhagen with UEFA changing their abbreviation 'KOB' to 'CPH'.

Winning the 2018–19 Danish Superliga placed Copenhagen in the second qualifying round of the 2019–20 UEFA Champions League, beating Welsh outfit The New Saints. The following round against Red Star Belgrade ended 2–2 on aggregate, with Copenhagen pulling the shortest straw and going out in penalties, thus sending Copenhagen to the UEFA Europa League instead. Here Latvian team Riga were beaten 3–2 on aggregate thus securing qualification for the group stage. Copenhagen finishing second in Group B contested with FC Lugano, Dynamo Kyiv and Scandinavian rivals Malmö FF. Copenhagen were then drawn against Scottish outfit Celtic in the first knockout round of the UEFA Europa League. The first match in Telia Parken finished 1–1, whilst Copenhagen won the return leg 3–1 at Celtic Park. The opponent for the next round were the Turkish club Istanbul Başakşehir. The game ended 1–0 with Copenhagen falling to a late penalty converted by Edin Višća. The subsequent return match in Copenhagen was temporarily put on hold due to the COVID-19 pandemic. On 5 August 2020, Copenhagen won 3–0 over Istanbul Başakşehir to reach the quarter-finals for the first time in their history. In the quarter-finals, Copenhagen lost 0–1 to Manchester United with a penalty from Bruno Fernandes coming in after extra time.

After poor results in the beginning of the 2020–21 Danish Superliga, and failure to qualify for the 2020–21 Europa League following a 0–1 defeat to HNK Rijeka, Ståle Solbakken was sacked by the club, and Hjalte Bo Nørregaard took over as caretaker manager, until Jess Thorup was appointed in 11 November 2020.

=== Thorup era ===
Despite improvements in performance, Copenhagen finished third in the 2020–21 Danish Superliga, missing out on the title and direct qualification for the UEFA Champions League. They did, however, secure a place in the 2021–22 Europa Conference League second qualifying round.

Copenhagen bounced back in the 2021–22 season, reclaiming the Danish Superliga title. This marked their return to domestic dominance after a two-year hiatus, finishing ahead of league rivals FC Midtjylland. Key players like Pep Biel and Jonas Wind were instrumental, although Wind's mid-season departure to Wolfsburg required adjustments to the squad. In Europe, the club competed in the inaugural UEFA Europa Conference League. They topped their group and progressed to the Round of 16, where they faced PSV Eindhoven. The first leg ended in a high-scoring 4–4 draw at the Philips Stadion. However, last-minute injuries to key players Kamil Grabara and Rasmus Falk and the suspension of Khouma Babacar left Copenhagen with a weakened squad for the second leg, which they lost 0–4 at home, resulting in elimination from the competition.

The 2022–23 season for Copenhagen began with optimism as the club qualified for the Champions League group stage for the first time since 2016–17. They achieved this by defeating Turkish champions Trabzonspor 2–1 on aggregate in the playoff round. Copenhagen was drawn into a challenging group with Manchester City, Borussia Dortmund, and Sevilla, signaling a significant step up in competition.

Domestically, the start of the Superliga season was marked by inconsistent performances. By September, the team had lost six of their opening 10 league matches, placing them far from the top of the table and raising concerns about their form. These struggles came in contrast to their Champions League qualification success, creating a sharp division between their European and domestic performances.

On 20 September 2022, Jess Thorup was dismissed as head coach due to the team's poor domestic results and concerns about their competitiveness in the league.

=== A young Jacob Neestrup takes charge ===
Jacob Neestrup, previously the assistant coach, was appointed as the new head coach the same day. Under his management, the team showed signs of improvement. In the 2022–23 Champions League group stage, Copenhagen managed to secure three draws at home, 0–0 against Sevilla (managed by Thorup), 0–0 against Manchester City, but following a 0–3 loss away to Sevilla sealed Copenhagen's 4th-place finish in the group and did not advance to the knockout stage. In the last group stage game, Copenhagen also drew 1-1 against Borussia Dortmund, where young talent Hákon Arnar Haraldsson scored the equalizer in the 41st minute following Thorgan Hazard's opener in the 23rd minute.

Domestically, Copenhagen's form improved following Neestrup's appointment. The team went unbeaten in the first 20 matches under his leadership and, after a victory against FC Nordsjælland in the Championship round, climbed to the top of the Superliga standings. The winter transfer window saw the arrival of Diogo Gonçalves and Jordan Larsson, while Victor Kristiansen was sold to Leicester City. Despite a few setbacks, including a tough run of one win in four games, the team regained its form with a crucial 3–1 victory over Brøndby in the away derby on 14 May 2023, despite the absence of key defenders Kevin Diks and Denis Vavro, who were suspended, and the injury to Davit Khocholava.

Copenhagen went on to win the Superliga title, securing their 15th championship. The victory came after a dramatic penultimate match day, where a loss for FC Nordsjælland ensured Copenhagen's title. The season also saw the team win the Danish Cup, defeating AaB 1–0 in the final following a goal by Diogo Gonçalves in the 48th minute. Neestrup's first season in charge was marked by a significant turnaround in the team's fortunes, leading to both domestic and European achievements, including the club's third star on their shirt.

The season also saw a rise in attendance at home matches, with an average of 28,860 spectators per game, reflecting an increase in fan support compared to the previous year.

Copenhagen's 2023–24 season was a blend of strong European performances and domestic struggles. The team showed resilience in their Champions League group stage, navigating a challenging group to progress to the Round of 16. Despite being eliminated by Manchester City, Copenhagen earned praise for their memorable results.

One of the standout matches came against Manchester United, where Copenhagen triumphed 4–3 in a thrilling encounter. Trailing 2–0 early after former Copenhagen youngster Rasmus Højlund scored twice for United, Copenhagen fought back with two quick goals just before halftime. Mohamed Elyounoussi pulled one back in the 45th minute, followed by a penalty from Diogo Gonçalves in the 45+9th minute to level the score. In the second half, Bruno Fernandes put United ahead with a penalty in the 69th minute, but Copenhagen responded with two late goals—Lukas Lerager in the 83rd minute and youngster Roony Bardghji scoring the winner in the 87th minute.

Copenhagen also earned an impressive 0–0 draw against Bayern Munich, holding the German giants to a stalemate in Allianz Arena. In their final group stage match, Copenhagen secured a crucial 1–0 win against Galatasaray, with Lukas Lerager scoring the only goal of the game in the 58th minute, and ensured their advancement to the Round of 16, where they were ultimately eliminated by Manchester City, losing 3–1 in both legs.

In the Danish Superliga, Copenhagen's season was marked by a mix of highs and lows. The team started strong, winning their first five matches and briefly occupying the top spot in the league. However, a series of disappointing results, including a 1–2 loss to both Viborg and AGF, saw the club fall down the table. By the midway point, they had slipped to third place.

The Championship round started poorly for Copenhagen, as they suffered a 1–2 loss to both Brøndby and Nordsjælland, followed by a 2–2 draw against Midtjylland. These results left the team trailing in the race for the title. However, a strong late surge of four consecutive wins brought them back into contention, briefly lifting them to first place. Unfortunately, they finished the season with two losses, allowing Brøndby and Midtjylland to overtake them. In a 1–1 draw against Nordsjælland secured third place for Copenhagen, and they subsequently won the European play-off match 2–1 against Randers, securing a spot in the 2024–25 Conference League second qualifying round.

Ahead of the 2024–25 season, Copenhagen unveiled an updated visual identity that strengthens its connection with the city and aligns with the club's growing ambitions. The new design, influenced by the club's "We are Copenhagen" strategy, includes modernized elements such as a more contemporary logo and the addition of a lioness alongside the lion in the club crest, symbolizing both the men's and women's teams. The updated brand also incorporates inspiration from Copenhagen's historic and modern elements, including new typography inspired by the city's street signs and an expanded color palette. This revamp aims to enhance Copenhagen's identity as both a sports and lifestyle brand, reflecting the club's evolving international presence and local roots. The same season they won the domestic double.

== Stadium ==
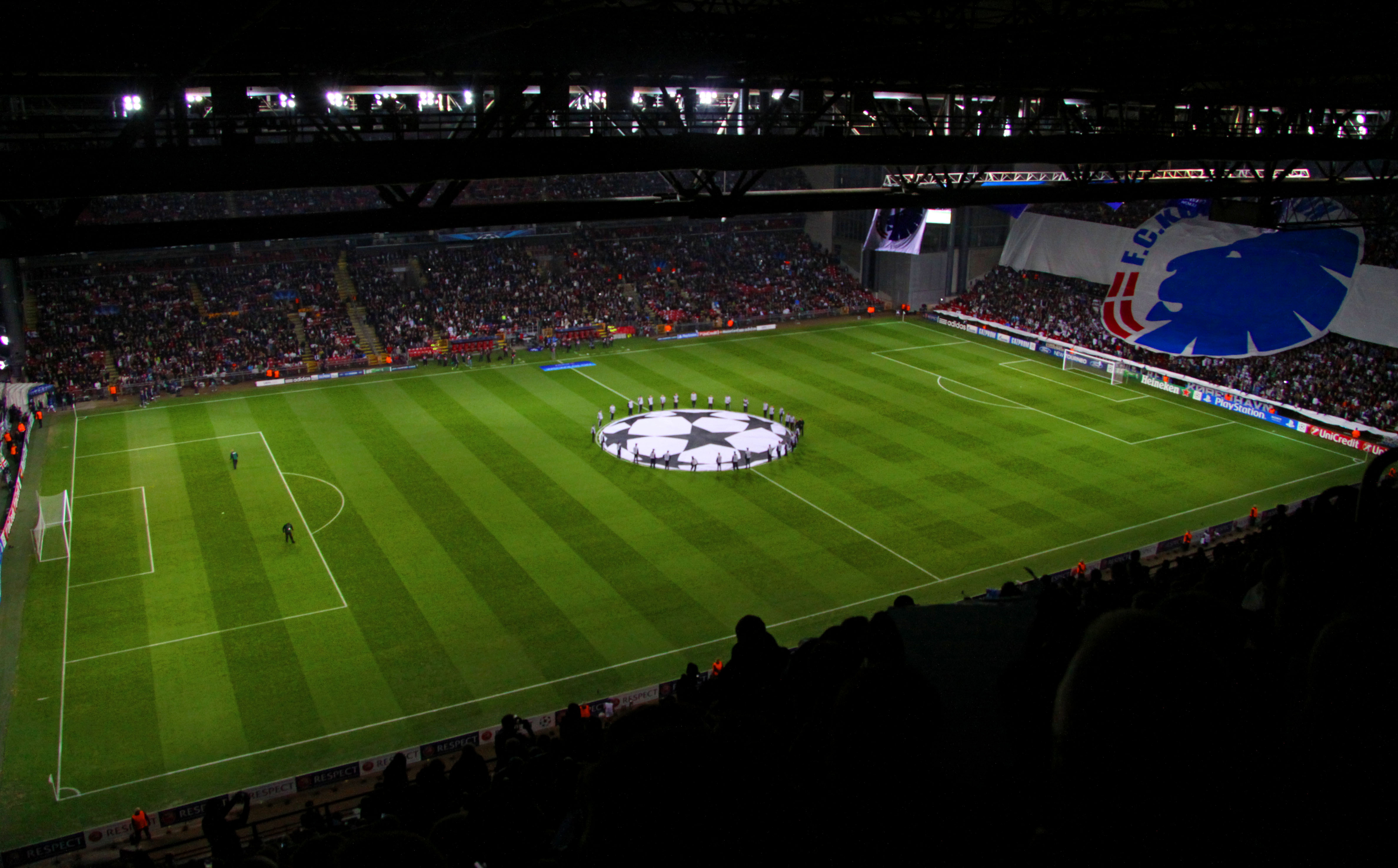
Parken Stadium

FCK owns its stadium, the national arena Parken Stadium. It was built in 1992, the same year the club was founded. Until the stadium opened (as Parken) in September 1992, the club played its first home matches at the smaller Østerbro Stadion, which is located adjacent to Parken. Parken has 38,065 seats, 4,000 fewer seats than the original capacity of 42,305.

== Supporters ==
After 2000, the club has regularly attracted one of the highest attendances in Scandinavia. The official fan club, F.C. København Fan Club, has more than 20,000 members. "FCKFC" was founded on 24 October 1991, approximately half a year before FCK played its first match. Furthermore, there are many unofficial "factions" connected to Copenhagen, the biggest being Urban Crew, Copenhagen Cooligans and Copenhagen Casuals. These are also reported to have friendships with factions from Hamburger SV, Rangers, IFK Helsinki and Helsingborgs IF. For the 2006–07 season, there were 23,795 spectators on average. For many years, the lower part of the "C-stand" at Parken, Nedre C, has been the main stand for the supporters of FCK. In 2006, a part of the lower "B-stand" was made a separate fan section for the fans who wanted to create more of an atmosphere and named Sektion 12. In general, most of FCK's supporters are from, and live, in the Copenhagen area, unlike their rivals, Brøndby IF, who have a reported 57% of their fanbase coming from Jutland. The area Sektion 12 on the lower "B-stand" grew so popular that the fans in a dialogue with the club made it bigger. That meant that the former family-area in the stadium in the other part of the "B-stand" got the whole new area called the "D-stand". The Sektion 12 area on the whole lower "B-stand" grew more and more popular which meant that the fans had a new dialogue with the club. That dialogue went well for the supporters and the club supported the suggestion of making the upper "B-stand" the second part of Sektion 12. Sektion 12 on the whole "B-stand" is now Northern Europe's biggest active stand.

== Honours ==
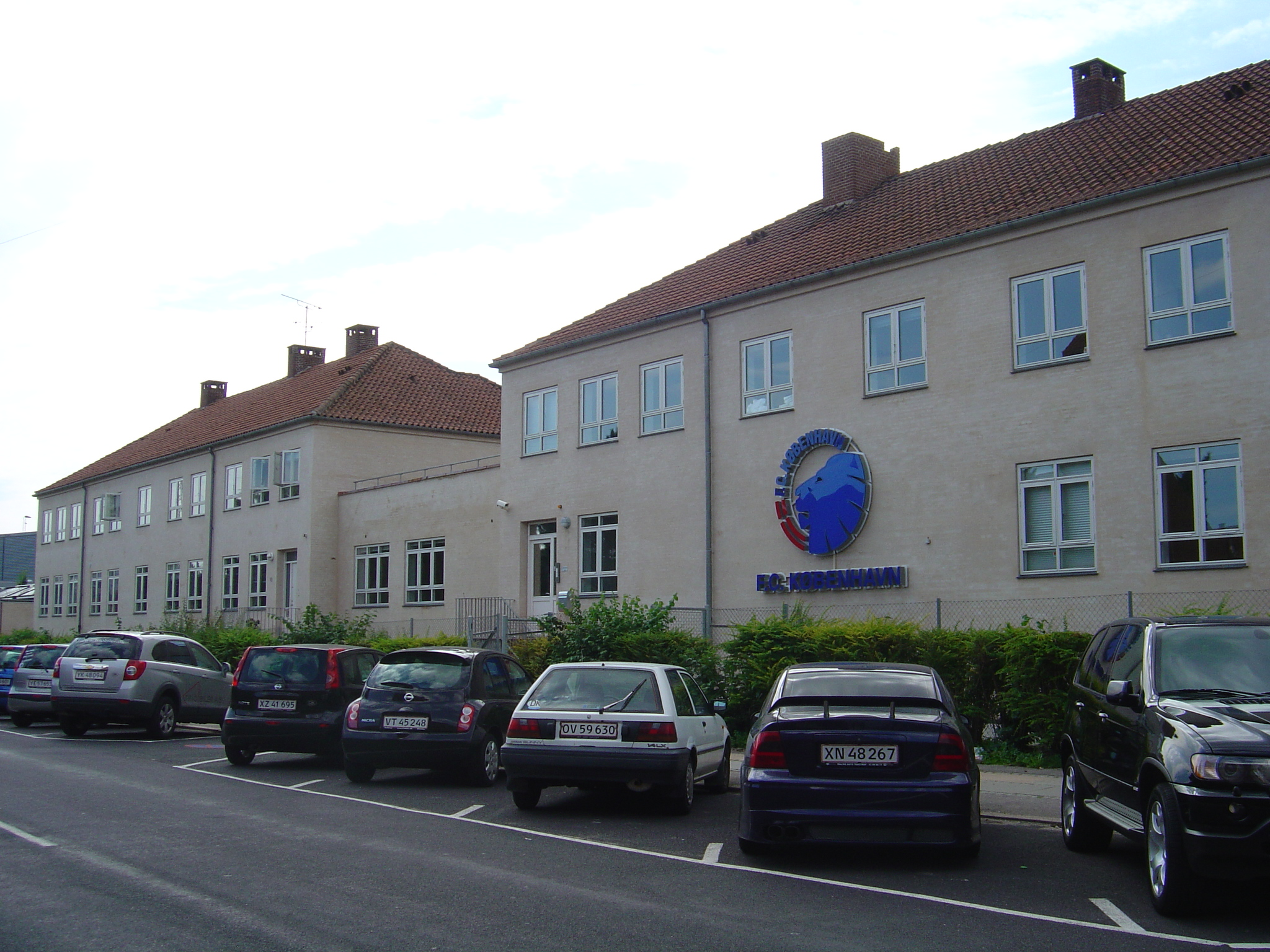
Buildings housing part of F.C. Copenhagen's training centre, Nummer 10.

=== National ===
- Danish Superliga
  - Winners (16) (record): 1992–93, 2000–01, 2002–03, 2003–04, 2005–06, 2006–07, 2008–09, 2009–10, 2010–11, 2012–13, 2015–16, 2016–17, 2018–19, 2021–22, 2022–23, 2024–25
  - Runners-up (7): 1993–94, 2001–02, 2004–05, 2011–12, 2013–14, 2014–15, 2019–20
- Danish Cup
  - Winners (10) (record): 1994–95, 1996–97, 2003–04, 2008–09, 2011–12, 2014–15, 2015–16, 2016–17, 2022–23, 2024–25
  - Runners-up (4): 1997–98, 2001–02, 2006–07, 2013–14
- Danish League Cup
  - Winners: 1996
  - Runners-up (2): 2005, 2006
- Danish Super Cup
  - Winners (3): 1995, 2001, 2004
- Ørestad Cup
  - Winners (2): 2000, 2002
- The Atlantic Cup
  - Winners (1): 2014
  - Runners-up (2): 2020, 2022

=== Regional ===
- Royal League
  - Winners (2) (record): 2004–05, 2005–06
  - Runner-up: 2006–07

== Copenhagen in European competitions ==
Copenhagen's first competitive European match was on 16 September 1992, in the 1992–93 UEFA Cup, beating MP 10–1 before losing to AJ Auxerre in the second round. In their first ever UEFA Champions League group stage match in 2006 they beat Manchester United 1–0 at home, via a goal in the 73rd minute by Marcus Allbäck.

Since then, the club has become the most successful Danish team in European competitions, reaching the group stage of the UEFA Champions League seven times (2006–07, 2010–11, 2011–12, 2016–17, 2022–23, 2023–24 and 2025-26) and advancing to the round of 16 in 2010–11 and 2023–24.

The closest they came to winning European silverware was in the 2019–20 season, when they reached the quarter-finals of the Europa League, which they lost to Manchester United 0–1 in added extra time.

=== UEFA coefficient ===
Correct as of 15 June 2025.

Rank	Team	Points
47	(Turkey) Fenerbahçe	47.250
48	(Portugal) Braga	46.000
49	(Denmark) Copenhagen	44.875
50	(Serbia) Red Star Belgrade	44.000
51	(France) Lyon	43.875

== Players ==
=== Current squad ===
As of 11 September 2026

Note: Flags indicate national team as defined under FIFA eligibility rules; some limited exceptions apply. Players may hold more than one non-FIFA nationality.

No.	Pos.	Nation	Player
1	GK	GER	Diant Ramaj (on loan from Dortmund)
2	DF	SWE	Felix Beijmo
4	DF	DEN	Asger Sørensen
6	DF	HUN	Ákos Markgráf
7	FW	ARG	Maher Carrizo (on loan from Ajax)
8	MF	DEN	Magnus Mattsson
10	FW	NOR	Mohamed Elyounoussi
12	FW	RSA	Thapelo Maseko
13	DF	MEX	Rodrigo Huescas
14	FW	DEN	Andreas Cornelius
15	DF	PER	Marcos López
16	FW	BRA	Robert Silva

No.	Pos.	Nation	Player
18	DF	CRC	Kenay Myrie
20	DF	JPN	Junnosuke Suzuki
21	MF	DEN	Mads Emil Madsen
24	DF	NOR	Birger Meling
27	MF	DEN	Thomas Delaney (captain)
28	MF	HUN	Hunor Németh
31	GK	ISL	Rúnar Alex Rúnarsson
33	MF	CZE	Alex Král
36	MF	DEN	William Clem
39	FW	ISL	Viktor Daðason
44	FW	CMR	Geovanni Ndjee
51	GK	DEN	Tobias Breum-Harild

=== Youth players in use ===
Note: Flags indicate national team as defined under FIFA eligibility rules; some limited exceptions apply. Players may hold more than one non-FIFA nationality.

No.	Pos.	Nation	Player
34	MF	DEN	Marvin Nasnas
40	DF	NOR	Henrik Haraldsen

No.	Pos.	Nation	Player
45	MF	ISL	Gunnar Orri Olsen

=== Out on loan ===
Note: Flags indicate national team as defined under FIFA eligibility rules; some limited exceptions apply. Players may hold more than one non-FIFA nationality.

No.	Pos.	Nation	Player
5	DF	BRA	Gabriel Pereira (at Vasco da Gama until 30 June 2027)
9	FW	GER	Youssoufa Moukoko (at Çorum until 30 June 2027)
23	MF	POL	Dominik Sarapata (at Artis Brno until 30 June 2027)
29	MF	DEN	Jonathan Moalem (at Strømsgodset until 30 June 2027)

No.	Pos.	Nation	Player
38	MF	DEN	Oliver Højer (at Lyngby until 30 June 2027)
61	GK	DEN	Oscar Buur (at Hødd until 31 December 2026)
—	GK	CRO	Dominik Kotarski (at Dinamo Zagreb until 30 June 2027)
—	DF	ZIM	Munashe Garananga (at Lyngby until 30 June 2027)

=== Reserves and youth teams ===
See F.C. Copenhagen Reserves and Youth Team

=== Captains ===
Years	Captain
1992–1993	(Denmark) Pierre Larsen (DF)
1993–1994	(Denmark) Palle Petersen (GK)
1994–1995	(Denmark) Allan Nielsen (MF)
1995–1997	(Denmark) Iørn Uldbjerg (MF)
1997–1998	(Denmark) Henrik Larsen (MF)
1998–1999	(Denmark) Peter Nielsen (MF)
1999–2001	(Denmark) Michael Mio Nielsen (MF)
2001–2002	(Denmark) Christian Lønstrup (MF)
2002–2003	(Denmark) Peter Nielsen (MF)
2004–2005	(Denmark) Bo Svensson (DF)
2005–2007	(Sweden) Tobias Linderoth (MF)
2007–2008	(Denmark) Michael Gravgaard (DF)
2008–2009	(Denmark) Ulrik Laursen (DF)
2009–2010	(Denmark) Hjalte Nørregaard (MF)
2010–2011	(Denmark) William Kvist (MF)
2011–2012	(Denmark) Mathias Jørgensen (DF)
2012–2014	(Denmark) Lars Jacobsen (DF)
2014–2016	(Denmark) Thomas Delaney (MF)
2016–2017	(Denmark) Mathias Jørgensen (DF)
2017–2018	(Denmark) William Kvist (MF)
2018–2023	(Greece) Zeca (MF)
2023–2026	(Sweden) Viktor Claesson (MF)
2026–	(Denmark) Thomas Delaney (MF)

=== FC Copenhagen All Stars ===
In 2014, 32,000 fans participated in a fan vote selecting their 11 all-time favourite Copenhagen players.

The FC Copenhagen All Stars.

Name	Pos	Nat	Years	Games	Goals	League games	League goals
Johan Wiland	GK	(Sweden)	2009–2015	192	0	141	0
Zdeněk Pospěch	RB	(Czech Republic)	2008–2011	151	16	108	14
Brede Hangeland	CB	(Norway)	2006–2008	107	6	63	3
Michael Gravgaard	CB	(Denmark)	2005–2008	129	10	79	7
Oscar Wendt	LB	(Sweden)	2006–2011	204	6	138	6
Tobias Linderoth	CM	(Sweden)	2004–2007	127	6	82	4
Christian Poulsen	CM	(Denmark)	2000–2002; 2014–2015	77	12	61	12
Atiba Hutchinson	CM	(Canada)	2006–2010	215	29	139	22
Sibusiso Zuma	RW	(South Africa)	2000–2005	188	53	145	41
Dame N'Doye	CF	(Senegal)	2009–2012; 2018–2020	217	118	151	90
Jesper Grønkjær	LW	(Denmark)	2006–2011	167	26	114	16

== Staff ==
=== Current technical staff ===
Position	Staff
Head Coach	(Denmark) Bo Svensson
Assistant Coach	(Germany) Tijan Njie
Assistant Coach	(Denmark) Kristoffer Wichmann
Goalkeeping Coach	(Denmark) Kim Christensen
Director of Football	(England) Kristjaan Speakman
Head of High Performance and Sports Science	(Australia) Andrew Clark
Chief Scout	(Denmark) Lars Højer

Last updated: 1 July 2026
Source: F.C. Copenhagen

=== Coaching history ===
There have been fifteen different coaches (permanent coaches and caretakers) of FC Copenhagen since 1992. One of the caretakers, Kim Brink, has coached the club during three separate tenures. The only non-Scandinavians to coach FCK are Roy Hodgson and Ariël Jacobs. The longest-running coach is Ståle Solbakken who has been in charge of FCK from 2006 to 2011 and from 2013 until 2020. Ståle Solbakken is also the most successful coach, in terms of winning percentage, with a winning percentage at 58.5%. Christian Andersen is FCK's least successful coach with a winning percentage at 0%. Andersen is also the shortest-running permanent coach of FCK as he only was in charge of FCK for just a single match before he was fired.

== Records ==
All-time goal scorers in all official tournaments

- 1 Dame N'Doye 118 Goals (217 Games)
- 2 César Santin 84 Goals (220 Games)
- 3 Andreas Cornelius 76 Goals (278 Games)
- 4 Todi Jónsson 68 Goals (207 Games)
- 5 Lars Højer 66 Goals (214 Games)
- 6 Peter Møller 55 Goals (203 Games)
- 7 Sibusiso Zuma 53 Goals (188 Games)
- 8 Nicolai Jørgensen 52 Goals (146 Games)
- 9 Álvaro Santos 50 Goals (120 Games)
- 10 Federico Santander 48 Goals (112 Games)
- 11 Jonas Wind 46 Goals (114 Games)
- 12 Marcus Allbäck 45 Goals (120 Games)
- 13 David Nielsen 43 Goals (133 Games)
- 14 Mohamed Elyounoussi 43 Goals (148 Games)
- 15 Morten Nordstrand 41 Goals (130 Games)
- 16 Martin Johansen 41 Goals (146 Games)
- 17 Viktor Claesson 40 Goals (189 Games)
- 18 Jordan Larsson 39 Goals (142 Games)
- 19 Ailton Almeida 37 Goals (139 Games)
- 20 Pieros Sotiriou 35 Goals (110 Games)

Most matches

- Superliga: William Kvist (2005) – 285
- UEFA tournaments: William Kvist (2005) – 90
- Overall: William Kvist (2005) – 425

Most goals

- Superliga: Dame N'Doye (2009) – 90
- UEFA tournaments: Dame N'Doye (2009) – 21
- Overall: Dame N'Doye (2009) – 118

Biggest victory in the Superliga

- 7–0 home against OB on 5 March 2023

Biggest defeat in the Superliga

- 0–5 away against Silkeborg on 17 April 1994
- 0–5 away against Brøndby on 16 May 2005
- 0 –5 away against Nordsjælland on 22 November 2026

Biggest victory in European cups

- 7–0 home against Cliftonville on 31 July 2008 (UEFA Cup)

Biggest defeat in European cups

- 0–6 home against AC Milan on 20 October 1993 (Champions League)

Attendance record

- 41,201 spectators against Brøndby on 30 April 2006

Youngest and oldest player playing in the Superliga

- Youngest player playing for Copenhagen: Roony Bardghji – 16 years and 6 days against AGF on 21 November 2021
- Oldest player playing for Copenhagen: Per Poulsen – 42 years and 125 days against Brøndby on 18 June 1995

Most Danish national championships won as player and manager

- Player: William Kvist – 8
- Manager: Ståle Solbakken – 8

(In brackets debut year)

== Season results ==
Performance graph of Football Club København

Season	League performance									Cup performance
Season	Pos	Pts	Pld	W	D	L	GF	GA	GD	Cup performance
23–24: 3F Superligaen	#3/12	59	32	18	5	9	64	38	+26	Eliminated in the quarter-final against Silkeborg, 2-3 agg.
22–23: 3F Superligaen	#1/12	59	32	18	5	9	61	35	+26	Winner, won the final against AaB, 1–0
21–22: 3F Superligaen	#1/12	68	32	20	8	4	56	19	+37	Eliminated in the third round by Nykøbing FC, 0–3
20–21: 3F Superligaen	#3/12	55	32	16	7	9	61	53	+8	Eliminated in the fourth round by FC Midtjylland, 1–1 (5–6 on penalties)
19–20: 3F Superligaen	#2/14	68	36	21	5	10	58	41	+17	Eliminated in the quarter-final by AaB, 0–2
18–19: Superligaen	#1/14	82	36	26	4	6	86	37	+49	Eliminated in the fourth round by FC Midtjylland, 0–2
17–18: Alka Superligaen	#4/14	58	36	17	7	12	65	47	+18	Eliminated in the fourth round by Brøndby, 0–1
16–17: Alka Superligaen	#1/14	84	36	25	9	2	74	20	+54	Winner, won the final against Brøndby, 3–1
15–16: Alka Superligaen	#1/12	71	33	21	8	4	62	28	+34	Winner, won the final against AGF, 2–1
14–15: (Alka) Superligaen	#2/12	67	33	20	7	6	40	22	+18	Winner, won the final against Vestsjælland, 3–2 (aet)
13–14: Superligaen	#2/12	56	33	15	11	7	54	38	+16	Lost the final against AaB, 2–4
12–13: Superligaen	#1/12	65	33	18	11	4	62	32	+30	Eliminated in the quarter-final by Brøndby, 0–1 (aet)
11–12: Superligaen	#2/12	66	33	19	9	5	55	26	+29	Winner, won the final against Horsens, 1–0.
10–11: Superligaen	#1/12	81	33	25	6	2	77	29	+48	Eliminated in fourth round by Horsens, 2–4
09–10: SAS Ligaen	#1/12	68	33	21	5	7	61	22	+39	Eliminated in fourth round by SønderjyskE, 0–5
08–09: SAS Ligaen	#1/12	74	33	23	5	5	67	26	+41	Winner, won the final against AaB, 1–0
07–08: SAS Ligaen	#3/12	60	33	17	9	7	51	29	+22	Eliminated in the semi-finals by Esbjerg, 2–3 agg.
06–07: SAS Ligaen	#1/12	76	33	23	7	3	60	23	+37	Lost the final against OB, 1–2
05–06: SAS Ligaen	#1/12	73	33	22	7	4	62	27	+35	Eliminated in the quarter-final by Brøndby, 0–1 (aet)
04–05: SAS Ligaen	#2/12	57	33	16	9	8	53	39	+14	Eliminated in the semi-finals by Brøndby, 2–3 agg.
03–04: SAS Ligaen	#1/12	68	33	20	8	5	56	27	+29	Winner, won the final against AaB, 1–0
02–03: SAS Ligaen	#1/12	61	33	17	10	6	51	32	+19	Eliminated in the quarter-final by Brøndby, 0–1
01–02: SAS Ligaen	#2/12	69	33	20	9	4	64	25	+39	Lost the final against OB, 1–2
00–01: Faxe Kondi Ligaen	#1/12	63	33	17	12	4	55	27	+28	Eliminated in 5th round by Brøndby, 0–2
99–00: Faxe Kondi Ligaen	#8/12	44	33	12	8	13	44	37	+7	Eliminated in the quarter-final by AB, 1–1 (4–5 on penalties)
98–99: Faxe Kondi Ligaen	#7/12	46	33	12	10	11	55	52	+3	Eliminated in the quarter-final by AB, 0–1 (aet)
97–98: Faxe Kondi Ligaen	#3/12	61	33	18	7	8	66	48	+18	Lost the final against Brøndby, 1–4
96–97: Faxe Kondi Ligaen	#8/12	41	33	10	11	12	35	43	−8	Winner, won the final against Ikast fS, 2–0
95–96: Coca-Cola Ligaen	#7/12	48	33	13	9	11	48	49	−1	Eliminated in 5th round by AGF, 0–2
94–95: Superligaen	#6/8	22	14	5	4	5	21	28	−7	Winner, won the final against AB, 5–0
93–94: Superligaen	#2/8	29	14	8	2	4	27	19	+8	Eliminated in 5th round by B 1909, 0–3
92–93: Superligaen	#1/8	32	14	8	3	3	31	23	+8	Eliminated in the semi-finals by OB, 1–4 agg.

== Other sports ==
F.C. Copenhagen launched an esports division called North in 2017, with a Danish team in Counter-Strike: Global Offensive. The team had some success, making the playoffs of two Global Offensive Majors and winning DreamHack Masters Stockholm 2018. The team ceased operations in February 2021, citing financial difficulties brought on in part by the COVID-19 pandemic.

Between 2002 and 2010 F.C. Copenhagen had a handball team: FCK Håndbold. The men's team won the Danish Championship in 2008.

== See also ==
- F.C. Copenhagen (women)
- Copenhagen Derby
