= 2021–22 Macedonian Football Cup =

Tournament details
- Country: North Macedonia
- Dates: 15 September 2021 – 20 May 2022
- Teams: 30

Final positions
- Champions: Makedonija G.P. (2nd title)
- Runners-up: Sileks

Tournament statistics
- Matches played: 20
- Goals scored: 44 (2.2 per match)

The 2021–22 Macedonian Football Cup was the 30th season of North Macedonia's football knockout competition. Sileks were the defending champions, having won their third title in the previous year.

Makedonija G.P. won the cup on 20 May 2022 with a 4–3 penalty shootout win over Sileks after a 0–0 draw, their second overall Macedonian Football Cup win.

== Competition calendar ==
Round	Date(s)	Fixtures	Clubs	New entries
First Round	15, 22 September 2021	14	30 → 14	30
Second Round	20 October 2021	8	16 → 8	2
Quarter-finals	1, 15 December 2021	4	8 → 4	none
Semi-finals	20 April 2022	2	4 → 2	none
Final	20 May 2022	1	2 → 1	none

== First round ==
Matches were played on 15 and 22 September 2021. The finalists from the previous season (Akademija Pandev and Sileks) received byes.

=== Summary ===
Team 1	Score	Team 2
15 September 2021
Detonit (2)	0–3	Makedonija G.P. (1)
Pobeda (2)	1–1 (4–5 p)	Vardar (2)
Besa Dobri Dol (2)	1–1 (3–4 p)	Skopje (1)
Lokomotiva Gradsko (2)	0–2	Ohrid (2)
Gostivar (2)	0–4	Renova (1)
Ljuboten (3)	0–9	Pelister (1)
Korabi (2)	1–2	Belasica (2)
Sloga 1934 (2)	0–3	Rabotnichki (1)
Novaci (3)	0–2	Tikvesh (1)
Kamenica Sasa (2)	0–2	Struga (1)
Voska Sport (2)	0–1	Bregalnica (1)
22 September 2021
Kit-Go (2)	0–2	Shkëndija (1)
Nju Stars (3)	1–4	Borec (1)
Veleshta (2)	0–1	Shkupi (1)

=== Matches ===
15 September 2021
15:00 CEST

Detonit (2)	0–3	Makedonija G.P. (1)
	Report	Fazliu 4'; Krstovski 28'; Kamara 60'

Gradski stadion, Radovish
Referee: Bobi Velichkov (Veles)

15 September 2021
15:00 CEST

Pobeda (2)	1–1	Vardar (2)
Angjeleski 90+5'	Report; Penalties	D. Blazhevski 53'
Penalties
Angjeleski (penalty scored); F. Spirkoski (penalty scored); Mitreski (penalty scored); Bosheski (penalty scored); Petejchuk (penalty missed)	4–5	(penalty scored) D. Blazhevski; (penalty scored) Petrov; (penalty scored) Nikolov; (penalty scored) Glishikj; (penalty scored) Petkovski

Stadion Goce Delchev, Prilep
Referee: Jovan Kachevski (Struga)

15 September 2021
15:00 CEST

Besa Dobri Dol (2)	1–1	Skopje (1)
Zhoglev 72'	Report; Penalties	Berisha 85' (o.g.)
Penalties
Beluli (penalty scored); Bekir (penalty scored); Chilajfi (penalty scored); Selimi (penalty scored); Berisha (penalty missed)	3–4	(penalty scored) Jasharoski; (penalty scored) Desnikj; (penalty scored) Nastevski; (penalty scored) Noveski; (penalty scored) Pecov

Rechica Stadium, Golema Rechica
Referee: Aleksandar Gjorgjeski (Tetovo)

15 September 2021
15:00 CEST

Lokomotiva Gradsko (2)	0–2	Ohrid (2)
	Report	Bakuleski 38'; Shoposki 73'

AMS Stadium, Gradsko
Referee: Marjan Dejanoski (Kichevo)

15 September 2021
15:00 CEST

Gostivar (2)	0–4	Renova (1)
	Report	Ali 47', 65'; Shefiti 67'; Mena 77'

Gradski stadion, Gostivar
Referee: Marjan Eckoski (Ohrid)

15 September 2021
15:00 CEST

Ljuboten (3)	0–9	Pelister (1)
	Report	Zdravevski 6', 12', 39'; Manevski 16', 20'; Sulejmani 36'; Juffo 54'; Talevski 79'; Ivanovski 84'

Stadion Tumbe Kafe, Bitola
Referee: Darko Stojchevski (Skopje)

15 September 2021
15:00 CEST

Korabi (2)	1–2	Belasica (2)
Ismail 63'	Report	Mitovski 15'; Milushev 87'

Gradski stadion, Debar
Attendance: 200
Referee: Marjan Mladenovski (Skopje)

15 September 2021
15:00 CEST

Sloga 1934 (2)	0–3	Rabotnički (1)
	Report	Stojkoski 10' (pen.); Lazarov 60'; Alomerovikj 63'

Stadion Filip II, Vinica
Referee: Stojanche Stojanov (Shtip)

15 September 2021
15:00 CEST

Novaci (3)	0–2	Tikvesh (1)
	Report	Gjurkovski 6'; Spahiu 12'

Stadion Novaci, Novaci
Referee: Kiril Smokvoski (Prilep)

15 September 2021
15:00 CEST

Kamenica Sasa (2)	0–2	Struga (1)
	Report	Skenderi 36'; Beqiri 89'

Gradski stadion, Makedonska Kamenica
Referee: Dejan Mladenovski (Skopje)

15 September 2021
15:00 CEST

Voska Sport (2)	0–1	Bregalnica (1)
	Report	Dodev 7'

SRC Biljanini Izvori, Ohrid
Referee: Dejan Jakimovski (Skopje)

22 September 2021
15:00 CEST

Kit-Go (2)	0–2	Shkëndija (1)
	Report	Shala 23'; Doriev 90+2'

Gradski stadion, Shtip
Attendance: 250
Referee: Blagojche Ralevski (Bitola)

22 September 2021
15:00 CEST

Nju Stars (3)	1–4	Borec (1)
Pasharikovski 33'	Report	Manasiev 23'; Ljuma 41'; Nikolovski 51'; Aliev 61'

Stadion Boris Trajkovski, Skopje
Referee: Fatmir Bafto (Ohrid)

22 September 2021
15:00 CEST

Veleshta (2)	0–1	Shkupi (1)
	Report	Gjorgjievski 45'

Stadion Veleshta, Veleshta
Referee: Vladimir Gjorgjievski (Bitola)

== Second round ==
The draw was held on 28 September 2021.

=== Summary ===
Team 1	Score	Team 2
20 October 2021
Struga (1)	1–1 (5–4 p)	Borec (1)
Akademija Pandev (1)	1–1 (3–5 p)	Makedonija G.P. (1)
Shkëndija (1)	5–0	Renova (1)
Vardar (2)	0–0 (4–2 p)	Skopje (1)
Bregalnica (1)	4–0	Ohrid (2)
Belasica (2)	2–4	Sileks (2)
Pelister (1)	0–0 (5–4 p)	Rabotnichki (1)
Shkupi (1)	1–0	Tikvesh (1)

=== Matches ===
20 October 2021
14:00 CEST

Struga (1)	1–1	Borec (1)
Bosančić 34'	Report; Penalties	Gjorgjiev 3' (pen.)
Penalties
Kocoski (penalty scored); De. Cvetanoski (penalty scored); Shabani (penalty scored); Jahja (penalty missed); Cake (penalty scored); Bojku (penalty scored)	5–4	(penalty scored) Trajkoski; (penalty missed) Jankulov; (penalty scored) Đorđević; (penalty scored) Radjen; (penalty scored) Gjorgjieski; (penalty missed) Stoimenovski

Gradska Plazha, Struga
Attendance: 300
Referee: Dejan Mladenovski (Skopje)

20 October 2021
14:00 CEST

Akademija Pandev (1)	1–1	Makedonija G.P.
Mirchevski 64' (pen.)	Report; Penalties	Adem 67' (pen.)
Penalties
Bihorac (penalty scored); Iliev (penalty scored); Velinovski (penalty scored); Ousman (penalty missed)	3–5	(penalty scored) Adem; (penalty scored) Mishevski; (penalty scored) Popzlatanov; (penalty scored) Augusto; (penalty scored) Emini

Sports Center "Pandev", Strumica
Referee: Krumislav Gjorgiev (Shtip)

20 October 2021
14:00 CEST

Shkëndija (1)	5–0	Renova (1)
Merxhani 4'; Shala 20', 45+1'; Hebaj 41', 54'	Report

Gradski stadion, Tetovo
Referee: Aleksandar Stavrev (Skopje)

20 October 2021
14:00 CEST

Vardar (2)	0–0	Skopje (1)
	Report; Penalties
Penalties
Petkovski (penalty scored); D. Stojanov (penalty scored); Glishikj (penalty scored); M. Blazhevski (penalty scored)	4–2	(penalty missed) Jasharoski; (penalty scored) Desnikj; (penalty scored) Nastevski; (penalty missed) Janakievski

Stadion Boris Trajkovski, Skopje
Attendance: 100
Referee: Marjan Eckoski (Ohrid)

20 October 2021
14:00 CEST

Bregalnica (1)	4–0	Ohrid (2)
Đokić 35'; Da. Cvetanoski 59' (o.g.); Kudijan 69'; M. Stojanov 90'	Report

Gradski stadion, Shtip
Attendance: 500
Referee: Done Ristovski (Gevgelija)

20 October 2021
14:00 CEST

Belasica (2)	2–4	Sileks (2)
Tasevski 64'; Mitovski 90'	Report	Mitev 13'; Tanushev 22'; F. Stojchevski 27'; B. Spirkoski 90+1'

Stadion Blagoj Istatov, Strumica
Referee: Igor Ivanov (Veles)

20 October 2021
14:00 CEST

Pelister (1)	0–0	Rabotnichki (1)
	Report; Penalties
Penalties
Jusuf (penalty scored); Veceski (penalty scored); Dragarski (penalty scored); Manevski (penalty scored); Boshkovski (penalty scored)	5–4	(penalty scored) Alomerovikj; (penalty scored) Ristevski; (penalty scored) Poznyak; (penalty missed) Darboe; (penalty scored) Mustafa

Stadion Tumbe Kafe, Bitola
Attendance: 200
Referee: Furkan Idrizi (Tetovo)

20 October 2021
14:00 CEST

Shkupi (1)	1–0	Tikvesh (1)
M. Cvetanoski 30'	Report

Stadion Chair, Skopje
Attendance: 500
Referee: Dejan Jakimovski (Skopje)

== Quarter-finals ==
The draw was held on 2 November 2021.

=== Summary ===
Team 1	Score	Team 2
1 December 2021
Sileks (2)	1–1 (5–4 p)	Bregalnica (1)
Shkëndija (1)	0–0 (3–4 p)	Struga (1)
Makedonija G.P. (1)	0–0 (4–1 p)	Shkupi (1)
15 December 2021
Pelister (1)	0–0 (3–2 p)	Vardar (2)

=== Matches ===
1 December 2021
13:00 CET

Sileks (2)	1–1	Bregalnica (1)
Azinovikj 56'	Report; Penalties	Đokić 47'
Penalties
Aliji (penalty scored); Peev (penalty scored); Stojchevski (penalty missed); B. Spirkoski (penalty scored); Kalanoski (penalty scored); Mitev (penalty scored)	5–4	(penalty scored) Kudijan; (penalty scored) Manevski; (penalty missed) Azinovikj; (penalty scored) Eskić; (penalty scored) Bakracheski; (penalty missed) Altiparmakovski

Gradski stadion, Kratovo
Attendance: 200
Referee: Aleksandar Grujoski (Kichevo)

1 December 2021
13:00 CET

Shkëndija (1)	0–0	Struga (1)
	Report; Penalties
Penalties
Krivák (penalty scored); Guri (penalty missed); Neziri (penalty scored); Dita (penalty scored); Nafiu (penalty missed)	3–4	(penalty scored) Tairi; (penalty scored) De. Cvetanoski; (penalty missed) Kochoski; (penalty scored) Galevski; (penalty scored) Cake

Gradski stadion, Tetovo
Referee: Igor Stojchevski (Skopje)

1 December 2021
13:00 CET

Makedonija G.P. (1)	0–0	Shkupi (1)
	Report; Penalties
Penalties
Adem (penalty scored); Lichina (penalty scored); Fazliu (penalty scored); Augusto (penalty scored)	4–1	(penalty missed) Radeski; (penalty scored) Cheshmedjiev; (penalty missed) Álvarez

Stadion Gjorche Petrov, Skopje
Attendance: 150
Referee: Aleksandar Stavrev (Skopje)

15 December 2021
13:00 CET

Pelister (1)	0–0	Vardar (2)
	Report; Penalties
Penalties
Jusuf (penalty scored); Veceski (penalty missed); Berisha (penalty scored); Manevski (penalty scored)	3–2	(penalty scored) Petkovski; (penalty scored) Risteski; (penalty missed) Glishikj; (penalty missed) Stojkovski; (penalty missed) Blazhevski

Stadion Petar Miloshevski, Bitola
Attendance: 500
Referee: Jovan Kachevski (Struga)

== Semi-finals ==
=== Summary ===
Team 1	Score	Team 2
20 April 2022
Pelister (1)	0–1	Sileks (2)
Struga (1)	0–0 (2–4 p)	Makedonija G.P. (1)

=== Matches ===
20 April 2022
16:00 CEST

Pelister (1)	0–1	Sileks (2)
	Report	Kalanoski 36'

Stadion Petar Miloshevski, Bitola
Attendance: 100
Referee: Igor Stojchevski (Skopje)

20 April 2022
16:00 CEST

Struga (1)	0–0	Makedonija G.P. (1)
	Report; Penalties
Penalties
Bosančić (penalty missed); Ilieski (penalty scored); Shabani (penalty scored); Galevski (penalty missed)	2–4	(penalty scored) Adem; (penalty scored) Atanaskoski; (penalty scored) Stojkoski; (penalty scored) Popzlatanov

Gradska Plazha, Struga
Referee: Aleksandar Stavrev (Skopje)

== Final ==
20 May 2022
18:00 CEST

Makedonija G.P. (1)	0–0 (a.e.t.)	Sileks (2)
	Report 1 Report 2
Penalties
Adem (penalty scored); Lichina (penalty scored); Atanaskoski (penalty scored); Popzlatanov (penalty missed); Emini (penalty scored)	4–3	(penalty missed) Burhan; (penalty scored) De. Cvetanoski; (penalty missed) Rajkov; (penalty scored) S. Stojchevski; (penalty scored) Kalanoski

Toshe Proeski Arena, Skopje
Attendance: 500
Referee: Aleksandar Grujoski (Kichevo)

== Season statistics ==
=== Top scorers ===
As of 22 May 2022.

Rank	Player	Club	Goals
1	(North Macedonia) Boban Zdravevski	Pelister	3
1	(Kosovo) Adenis Shala	Shkendija	3
2	(North Macedonia) Borche Manevski	Pelister	2
2	(North Macedonia) Antonio Kalanoski	Sileks	2
2	(North Macedonia) Slavce Mitovski	Belasica	2
2	(Albania) Rubin Hebaj	Shkendija	2
2	(Serbia) Milan Đokić	Bregalnica Štip	2

== See also ==
- 2021–22 Macedonian First Football League
- 2021–22 Macedonian Second Football League
