= 2021–22 Macedonian Second Football League =

Macedonian Second League
- Season: 2021–22
- Dates: 25 August 2021 – 14 May 2022

The 2021–22 Macedonian Second Football League was the 30th season of the Macedonian Second Football League, the second division in the Macedonian football league system. The season began on 25 August 2021 and concluded on 14 May 2022.

== East ==
=== Participating teams ===
Location of teams in 2021–22 Macedonian Second League - East

Club	City	Stadium	Capacity
Belasica	Strumica	Stadion Mladost	6,500
Bratstvo 07	Žitoše	Smajo Kolasinac	500
Detonit	Radovish	Gradski stadion Radovish	2,000
Kozhuf	Gevgelija	Gradski stadion Gevgelija	1,400
Osogovo	Kochani	Stadion Nikola Mantov	4,350
Lokomotiva	Gradsko	Stadion Gradsko	300
Pehchevo	Pehchevo	Gradski stadion Pehchevo	1,200
Pobeda	Prilep	Gradski stadion Goce Delchev	15,000
Sasa	Makedonska Kamenica	Gradski stadion M. Kamenica	5,000
Sloga 1934	Vinica	Gradski stadion Vinica	3,000

=== League table ===
Pos	Team	Pld	W	D	L	GF	GA	GD	Pts	Promotion or relegation
1	Pobeda (C, P)	27	19	5	3	64	21	+43	62	Promotion to the Macedonian First League
2	Belasica	27	18	5	4	56	14	+42	59	Qualification for the Promotion play-off match
3	Sloga 1934	27	17	4	6	41	22	+19	55	
4	Sasa	27	13	6	8	32	18	+14	45	
5	Kozhuf	27	9	10	8	31	24	+7	37	
6	Detonit Junior (Note: Detonit Junior was merged with Plačkovica after the season to form Detonit Plačkovica.)	27	9	7	11	33	37	−4	34	
7	Pehchevo (R)	27	10	3	14	35	31	+4	33	Relegation to Macedonian Third League
8	Osogovo (R)	27	8	7	12	34	45	−11	31	Relegation to Macedonian Third League
9	Bratstvo (R)	27	4	3	20	19	59	−40	15	Relegation to Macedonian Third League
10	Lokomotiva (R)	27	1	4	22	12	86	−74	7	Relegation to Macedonian Third League

Source: MacedonianFootball.com
Rules for classification: 1) Points; 2) Head-to-head points; 3) Head-to-head goal difference; 4) Head-to-head away goals scored
(C) Champions; (P) Promoted; (R) Relegated

=== Results ===
==== Matches 1–18 ====
Home \ Away	BEL	BRA	DET	KOZ	LOK	OSO	PEH	POB	SAS	SLO
Belasica	—	2–0	4–1	1–1	6–0	0–2	3–1	0–1	0–1	3–0
Bratstvo	1–1	—	1–0	0–1	4–1	2–4	0–4	1–4	2–1	0–1
Detonit Junior	0–2	4–0	—	0–0	2–1	0–0	1–0	0–0	1–3	2–1
Kozhuf	1–2	1–0	1–1	—	3–0	1–1	2–1	0–2	0–0	1–1
Lokomotiva	0–2	1–0	1–3	0–2	—	1–1	0–1	1–4	0–0	1–2
Osogovo	0–3	2–0	2–1	1–1	2–2	—	0–3	1–3	1–4	3–0
Pehchevo	0–1	2–1	4–1	1–0	4–0	0–1	—	1–1	0–1	1–2
Pobeda	0–0	5–0	1–0	3–1	4–0	6–0	2–1	—	1–1	1–2
Sasa	0–0	0–1	1–0	1–0	1–0	2–0	2–0	3–0	—	0–1
Sloga 1934	1–1	1–0	1–1	2–1	3–0	1–0	2–1	2–1	2–0	—

Source: MacedonianFootball.com
Legend: Blue = home team win; Yellow = draw; Red = away team win.

==== Matches 19–27 ====
Home \ Away	BEL	BRA	DET	KOZ	LOK	OSO	PEH	POB	SAS	SLO
Belasica	—	—	2–0	—	6–0	—	3–0	—	2–0	1–0
Bratstvo	0–3	—	1–2	—	—	2–4	—	—	—	0–3
Detonit Junior	—	—	—	2–2	4–0	—	—	2–5	2–1	—
Kozhuf	1–3	0–0	—	—	—	1–0	—	—	—	1–0
Lokomotiva	—	2–2	—	0–7	—	—	—	1–2	0–4	—
Osogovo	0–5	—	1–1	—	6–0	—	1–1	—	—	0–1
Pehchevo	—	3–1	0–1	1–0	3–0	—	—	—	—	—
Pobeda	3–0	6–0	—	1–1	—	2–1	2–0	—	—	—
Sasa	—	1–0	—	0–1	—	2–0	2–2	1–2	—	—
Sloga 1934	—	—	2–1	—	8–0	—	1–0	1–2	0–0	—

Source: MacedonianFootball.com
Legend: Blue = home team win; Yellow = draw; Red = away team win.

=== Top scorers ===
As of 14 May 2022

Rank	Player	Club	Goals
1	(North Macedonia) Bojan Spirkoski	Pobeda	20
2	(North Macedonia) Toshe Manov	Osogovo	17
3	(North Macedonia) Aleksandar Kocev	Belasica	11
4	(North Macedonia) Ivan Mitrov	Sloga 1934	9
4	(North Macedonia) Bojan Ivanov	Sloga 1934	9

== West ==
=== Participating teams ===
Location of teams in 2021–22 Macedonian Second League - West

Club	City	Stadium	Capacity
Besa	Dobri Dol	Global Arena	4,000
Gostivar	Gostivar	Gradski stadion Gostivar	1,000
Kadino	Kadino	Stadion Kadino	500
Korabi	Debar	Gradski stadion Debar	2,500
Ohrid	Ohrid	SRC Biljanini Izvori	3,000
Sileks	Kratovo	City Stadium Kratovo	4,000
Teteks	Tetovo	AMS Sportski Centar Tetovo	2,000
Vardar	Skopje	Stadion Zhelezarnica	3,000
Veleshta	Veleshta	Stadion Veleshta	
Voska Sport	Ohrid	SRC Biljanini Izvori	3,000

=== League table ===
Pos	Team	Pld	W	D	L	GF	GA	GD	Pts	Promotion or relegation
1	Sileks (C, P)	27	20	6	1	55	9	+46	66	Promotion to Macedonian First League
2	Voska Sport	27	18	5	4	51	14	+37	59	Qualification to Promotion play-off match
3	Vardar	27	18	4	5	47	15	+32	58	
4	Gostivar	27	9	10	8	36	37	−1	37	
5	Teteks	27	10	6	11	32	44	−12	36	
6	Besa	27	9	8	10	41	28	+13	35	
7	Ohrid	27	9	5	13	34	32	+2	32	
8	Korab (R)	27	7	6	14	33	43	−10	27	Relegation to Macedonian Third League
9	Veleshta (R)	27	4	6	17	25	61	−36	18	Relegation to Macedonian Third League
10	Kadino (R)	27	1	4	22	13	84	−71	7	Relegation to Macedonian Third League

Source: MacedonianFootball.com
Rules for classification: 1) Points; 2) Head-to-head points; 3) Head-to-head goal difference; 4) Head-to-head away goals scored
(C) Champions; (P) Promoted; (R) Relegated

=== Results ===
==== Matches 1–18 ====
Home \ Away	BES	GOS	KAD	KOR	OHR	SIL	TET	VAR	VEL	VOS
Besa	—	1–1	1–1	1–2	0–2	0–0	2–0	0–1	3–1	0–1
Gostivar	0–2	—	1–0	4–2	2–1	2–2	2–3	1–1	1–1	0–4
Kadino	0–5	0–0	—	1–3	2–1	0–3	0–1	0–3	0–1	0–2
Korab	0–3	1–3	1–0	—	0–0	0–1	3–3	0–0	1–0	1–1
Ohrid	4–1	4–2	3–1	1–2	—	0–1	0–1	0–0	2–1	1–2
Sileks	1–0	1–1	7–0	3–0	3–0	—	3–1	2–1	5–0	2–0
Teteks	2–1	2–1	1–1	2–0	1–1	0–2	—	0–3	2–1	1–1
Vardar	2–2	3–1	3–0	1–0	2–0	1–2	2–0	—	4–0	2–0
Veleshta	1–1	2–2	2–0	2–2	1–1	0–3	2–1	2–1	—	1–2
Voska Sport	2–0	0–1	5–0	3–1	1–0	0–0	2–0	2–1	4–0	—

Source: MacedonianFootball.com
Legend: Blue = home team win; Yellow = draw; Red = away team win.

==== Matches 19–27 ====
Home \ Away	BES	GOS	KAD	KOR	OHR	SIL	TET	VAR	VEL	VOS
Besa	—	—	7–2	2–0	1–0	—	—	—	8–1	—
Gostivar	0–0	—	6–1	—	0–0	0–2	—	2–1	—	—
Kadino	—	—	—	0–6	—	—	0–4	—	1–1	1–2
Korab	—	0–1	—	—	—	0–1	—	1–2	3–1	—
Ohrid	—	—	6–2	2–1	—	—	2–0	—	—	0–1
Sileks	0–0	—	5–0	—	1–0	—	2–0	—	—	1–1
Teteks	0–0	2–0	—	3–3	—	—	—	—	2–0	0–6
Vardar	1–0	—	4–0	—	1–0	1–0	4–0	—	—	—
Veleshta	—	1–2	—	—	2–3	1–2	—	0–1	—	—
Voska Sport	3–0	0–0	—	2–0	—	—	—	0–1	4–0	—

Source: MacedonianFootball.com
Legend: Blue = home team win; Yellow = draw; Red = away team win.

=== Top scorers ===
As of 14 May 2022

Rank	Player	Club	Goals
1	(North Macedonia) Izair Emini	Voska Sport	15
2	(North Macedonia) Filip Petkovski	Vardar	13
3	(North Macedonia) Gjorgji Tanushev	Sileks	11
4	(North Macedonia) Antonio Kalanoski	Sileks	10
5	(North Macedonia) Damjan Masevski	Teteks	9

== See also ==
- 2021–22 Macedonian Football Cup
- 2021–22 Macedonian First Football League
