= 2025–26 F.C. Copenhagen season =

F.C. Copenhagen
2025–26 season
- Chairman: Henrik Møgelmose
- Head coach: Bo Svensson
- Stadium: Parken
- Danish Superliga: 7th
- Danish Cup: Runners-up
- UEFA Champions League: League phase
- Top goalscorer: League: Jordan Larsson (13); All: Youssoufa Moukoko (18)
- Highest home attendance: 35,085 (21 October 2025 vs. Dortmund)
- Lowest home attendance: 15,885 (11 February 2026 vs. Viborg)
- Average home league attendance: 24,776
- Biggest win: 7–0 (5 April 2025 vs. Silkeborg)
- Biggest defeat: 0–4 (4 November 2025 vs. Tottenham Hotspur)
Home colours	Away colours	Third colours

The 2025–26 F.C. Copenhagen season was the club's 34th season in existence, all of which were competed in the top flight of Danish football.

By virtue of winning the 2024–25 Danish Superliga, Copenhagen competed in the UEFA Champions League and the 2025–26 Danish Cup. The season covers the period from 1 July 2025 to 30 June 2026.

== Players ==
=== First-team squad ===
As of 3 February 2026

No.	Player	Nationality	Position	Since	Date of birth	Signed from
Goalkeepers
1	Dominik Kotarski	(Croatia)	GK	2025	10 February 2000	(Greece) PAOK
31	Rúnar Alex Rúnarsson	(Iceland)	GK	2024	18 February 1995	(England) Arsenal
61	Oscar Gadeberg Buur	(Denmark)	GK	2025	29 October 2006	(Denmark) Homegrown
Defenders
5	Gabriel Pereira	(Brazil)	CB	2024	7 May 2000	(Portugal) Gil Vicente
6	Pantelis Hatzidiakos	(Greece) (Netherlands)	CB	2024	18 January 1997	(Italy) Cagliari
13	Rodrigo Huescas	(Mexico)	RB	2024	18 September 2003	(Mexico) Cruz Azul
15	Marcos López	(Peru)	LB	2024	20 November 1999	(Netherlands) Feyenoord
17	Aurélio Buta	(Portugal)	RB	2026	10 February 1997	(Germany) Eintracht Frankfurt
18	Kenay Myrie	(Costa Rica)	RB	2026	6 September 2006	(Costa Rica) Deportivo Saprissa
20	Junnosuke Suzuki	(Japan)	CB	2025	12 July 2003	(Japan) Shonan Bellmare
24	Birger Meling	(Norway)	LB	2023	17 December 1994	(France) Rennes
25	Mathias Jørgensen	(Denmark)	CB	2026	23 April 1990	(United States) LA Galaxy
Midfielders
8	Magnus Mattsson	(Denmark)	CM	2024	25 February 1999	(Netherlands) NEC Nijmegen
21	Mads Emil Madsen	(Denmark)	CM	2025	14 January 1998	(Denmark) AGF
23	Amir Richardson	(Morocco)	CM	2026	24 January 2002	(Italy) Fiorentina
27	Thomas Delaney	(Denmark)	CM	2024	3 September 1991	(Spain) Sevilla
29	Jonathan Moalem	(Denmark)	CM	2025	1 February 2007	(Denmark) Homegrown
36	William Clem	(Denmark)	CDM	2023	20 June 2004	(Denmark) Homegrown
38	Oliver Højer	(Denmark)	CM	2024	24 January 2007	(Denmark) Homegrown
Forwards
7	Viktor Claesson (captain)	(Sweden)	CF	2022	2 January 1992	(Russia) Krasnodar
9	Youssoufa Moukoko	(Germany) (Cameroon)	CF	2025	20 November 2004	(Germany) Borussia Dortmund
10	Mohamed Elyounoussi	(Norway)	SS	2023	4 August 1994	(England) Southampton
11	Jordan Larsson	(Sweden)	RW	2023	20 June 1997	(Germany) Schalke 04
14	Andreas Cornelius	(Denmark)	CF	2022	16 March 1993	(Turkey) Trabzonspor
16	Robert	(Brazil)	LW	2024	13 April 2005	(Brazil) Cruzeiro
26	Liam West	(Norway) (United States)	RW	2025	16 December 2007	(Denmark) Homegrown
30	Elias Achouri	(Tunisia) (France)	LW	2023	10 February 1999	(Denmark) Viborg
39	Viktor Daðason	(Iceland)	CF	2025	30 June 2008	(Denmark) Homegrown

=== Youth players in use ===
Note: Flags indicate national team as defined under FIFA eligibility rules; some limited exceptions apply. Players may hold more than one non-FIFA nationality.

No.	Pos.	Nation	Player
37	FW	DEN	Abdul Daramy
42	DF	DEN	Graham Ankamafio

No.	Pos.	Nation	Player
44	FW	CMR	Geovanni Vianney

=== Out on loan ===
Note: Flags indicate national team as defined under FIFA eligibility rules; some limited exceptions apply. Players may hold more than one non-FIFA nationality.

No.	Pos.	Nation	Player
1	GK	ENG	Nathan Trott (at Cardiff City until 30 June 2026)
4	DF	ZIM	Munashe Garananga (at Hibernian until 30 June 2026)
19	FW	ALG	Amin Chiakha (at Rosenborg until 31 December 2026)

No.	Pos.	Nation	Player
21	GK	DEN	Theo Sander (at Odense BK until 30 June 2026)
23	MF	POL	Dominik Sarapata (at Wisła Płock until 30 June 2026)
28	MF	HUN	Hunor Németh (at MTK Budapest until 30 June 2026)

== Transfers ==
=== In ===
Date	Pos.	Nat.	Name	Club	Fee	Ref.
1 July 2025	MF	(Poland)	Dominik Sarapata	(Poland) Górnik Zabrze	€4.00m	
1 July 2025	DF	(Peru)	Marcos López	(Netherlands) Feyenoord	€1.20m	
1 July 2025	DF	(Greece) (Netherlands)	Pantelis Hatzidiakos	(Italy) Cagliari	€1.50m	
1 July 2025	FW	(Germany) (Cameroon)	Youssoufa Moukoko	(Germany) Borussia Dortmund	€5.00m	
9 July 2025	GK	(Croatia)	Dominik Kotarski	(Greece) PAOK	€5.00m	
9 July 2025	DF	(Japan)	Junnosuke Suzuki	(Japan) Shonan Bellmare	€1.20m	
1 September 2025	MF	(Denmark)	Mads Emil Madsen	(Denmark) AGF	€4.00m	
16 January 2026	DF	(Costa Rica)	Kenay Myrie	(Costa Rica) Deportivo Saprissa	€860k	
30 January 2026	DF	(Portugal)	Aurélio Buta	(Germany) Eintracht Frankfurt	Free Transfer	
25 February 2026	DF	(Denmark)	Mathias Jørgensen	(United States) LA Galaxy	Free Transfer	

=== Loans in ===
Date	Pos.	Nat.	Name	Club	Duration	Ref.
1 July 2025	DF	(France)	Yoram Zague	(France) Paris Saint-Germain	31 January 2026	
22 January 2026	MF	(Morocco)	Amir Richardson	(Italy) Fiorentina	30 June 2026	

=== Out ===
Date	Pos.	Nat.	Name	Club	Fee	Ref.
1 July 2025	DF	(Slovakia)	Denis Vavro	(Germany) Wolfsburg	€2.00m	
1 July 2025	DF	(Indonesia) (Netherlands)	Kevin Diks	(Germany) Borussia Mönchengladbach	Free Transfer	
1 July 2025	DF	(Denmark)	Nicolai Boilesen	Retired	N/A	
2 July 2025	MF	(Nigeria)	Paul Mukairu	(Poland) Pogoń Szczecin	Undisclosed	
2 July 2025	MF	(Denmark)	Rasmus Falk	(Denmark) OB	Free Transfer	
7 July 2025	FW	(France) (Ivory Coast)	Mamoudou Karamoko	(Romania) Dinamo București	Undisclosed	
14 July 2025	MF	(Sweden)	Roony Bardghji	(Spain) Barcelona	€2.50m	
23 July 2025	MF	(Denmark)	Victor Froholdt	(Portugal) Porto	€20.00m	
12 September 2025	FW	(Russia) (Nigeria)	German Onugkha	(Turkey) Kayserispor	€250k	
17 December 2025	MF	(Denmark)	Lukas Lerager	(Poland) Widzew Łódź	Free Transfer	
31 January 2026	DF	(France)	Yoram Zague	(France) Paris Saint-Germain	Loan Cancelled	

=== Loans out ===
Date	Pos.	Nat.	Name	Club	Duration	Ref.
17 July 2025	GK	(Denmark)	Theo Sander	(Denmark) OB	30 June 2026	
24 July 2025	MF	(Hungary)	Hunor Németh	(Hungary) MTK Budapest	30 June 2026	
6 August 2025	GK	(England) (Bermuda)	Nathan Trott	(Wales) Cardiff City	30 June 2026	
6 August 2025	FW	(Algeria) (Denmark)	Amin Chiakha	(Denmark) Vejle	23 January 2026	
23 January 2026	FW	(Algeria) (Denmark)	Amin Chiakha	(Norway) Rosenborg	31 December 2026	
27 January 2026	MF	(Poland)	Dominik Sarapata	(Poland) Wisła Płock	30 June 2026	
2 February 2026	DF	(Zimbabwe)	Munashe Garananga	(Scotland) Hibernian	30 June 2026	

=== New contracts ===
Date	Pos.	Nat.	Name	Contract until	Ref.
6 June 2025	MF	(Denmark)	Jonathan Moalem	30 June 2030	
20 June 2025	MF	(Hungary)	Hunor Németh	30 June 2030	
8 July 2025	MF	(Norway)	Mohamed Elyounoussi	30 June 2029	
27 January 2026	MF	(Poland)	Dominik Sarapata	30 June 2029	
12 February 2026	FW	(Norway)	Liam West	Undisclosed	

== Non-competitive ==
=== Pre-season ===
30 June 2025	Ludogorets Razgrad (Bulgaria)	0–0	Copenhagen	Kufstein, Austria
18:00 CEST		Report		Stadium: Grenzlandstadion Kufstein; Attendance: 75; Referee: Stjepan Bosnjak (Austria)

3 July 2025	Sparta Prague (Czech Republic)	1–0	Copenhagen	St. Johann, Austria
16:00 CEST	Kuchta 14'	Report		Stadium: Kosasastadion; Attendance: 150; Referee: Florian Jäger (Austria)
Note: Game was interrupted and cancelled due to severe weather after 15 minutes.

8 July 2025	Copenhagen	1–1	Fredericia	Frederiksberg
14:00 CEST	West 63' (Meling)	Report	Egelund 50'	Stadium: Nummer 10; Referee: Oliver Simbold

9 July 2025	Copenhagen	0–1	Hillerød	Frederiksberg
12:00 CEST		Report	Justinussen 59'	Stadium: Nummer 10; Referee: Nicki Nordlund Hansen

12 July 2025	Copenhagen	1–0	(Germany) Hamburger SV	Copenhagen
16:00 CEST	Larsson 10' (Achouri)	Report		Stadium: Parken; Attendance: 23,132; Referee: Jakob A. Sundberg

=== In-season ===
9 September 2025	Copenhagen	0–0	Hvidovre	Frederiksberg
12:00 CEST		Report		Stadium: Nummer 10; Attendance: 75; Referee: Frida Mia Klarlund

=== Mid-season ===
10 January 2026	SK Brann (Norway)	1–1	Copenhagen	Marbella, Spain
16:00 CET	Soltvedt 90'; Kornvig (yellow card) 69'	Report	Højer 63'; Larsson (red card) 69'	Stadium: Marbella Football Center; Attendance: 50; Referee: Manuel Camacho Garrote (Spain)

14 January 2026	Sturm Graz (Austria)	4–4	Copenhagen	Marbella, Spain
16:00 CET	Kiteishvili (yellow card) 7', (goal) 54'; Horvat 11'; Malone 18', 87'	Report	Gabriel Pereira (yellow card) 9'; Daðason 15', 60'; Claesson 93'; Moukoko 103'; Clem (yellow card) 113'; Ankamafio (yellow card) 119'	Stadium: Marbella Football Center; Attendance: 50; Referee: Jim Dyb (Norway)

23 January 2026	Copenhagen	3–2	B.93	Frederiksberg
12:00 CET	Delaney (yellow card) 50'; Moukoko 24' (pen.); Claesson 56', 70'; Clem (yellow card) 75'; Fetterlein (yellow card) 84'	Report	Risbjerg 13'; Belhadj 81'	Stadium: Nummer 10; Attendance: 200; Referee: Magnus DIlling

1 February 2026	Copenhagen	0–4	AGF	Frederiksberg
14:00 CET	Buta (yellow card) 36'	Report	Yakob 54'; Arnstad 56'; Bech 60'; Emmery 61'	Stadium: Nummer 10; Attendance: 0 Referee: Svend Funder

== Competitions ==
=== Overall record ===
Competition	First match	Last match	Starting round	Final position	Record							
Competition	First match	Last match	Starting round	Final position	Pld	W	D	L	GF	GA	GD	Win %
Superliga	18 July 2025	17 May 2026	Matchday 1		32	15	6	11	67	44	+23	46.88
Danish Cup	24 September 2025	14 May 2026	Third round	Runners-up	7	6	0	1	16	6	+10	85.71
Champions League	22 July 2025	28 January 2026	Second qualifying round	League stage, 31st	14	6	4	4	23	22	+1	42.86
Total					53	27	10	16	106	72	+34	50.94

Last updated: 17 May 2026
Source: Soccerway

Source: Competitive matches

=== Superliga ===
==== League table ====
Pos	Team	Pld	W	D	L	GF	GA	GD	Pts	Qualification
5	Viborg	22	10	3	9	37	35	+2	33	Qualification for the Championship round
6	Nordsjælland	22	10	1	11	37	39	−2	31	Qualification for the Championship round
7	Copenhagen	22	8	5	9	35	34	+1	29	Qualification for the Relegation round
8	OB	22	7	6	9	36	46	−10	27	Qualification for the Relegation round
9	Randers	22	7	5	10	22	27	−5	26	Qualification for the Relegation round

Source: Danish Football Association (in Danish), Soccerway
Rules for classification: 1) Points; 2) Goal difference; 3) Goals scored; 4) Away goals scored; 5) Play-off (played on neutral ground if determining teams for different rounds); 6) Draw.

==== Results summary ====
Overall								Home						Away					
Pld	W	D	L	GF	GA	GD	Pts	W	D	L	GF	GA	GD	W	D	L	GF	GA	GD
32	15	6	11	67	44	+23	51	7	4	5	33	19	+14	8	2	6	34	25	+9

Last updated: 17 May 2026.
Source: FBref

==== Results by round – regular season ====
Matchday	1	2	3	4	5	6	7	8	9	10	11	12	13	14	15	16	17	18	19	20	21	22
Ground	A	H	A	H	A	H	A	A	H	A	H	A	H	H	A	H	A	H	A	H	A	H
Result	W	W	W	L	W	D	W	L	D	W	D	L	D	W	L	W	L	L	L	L	D	L
Position	2	2	1	1	1	1	1	2	3	3	3	4	4	4	4	4	4	5	5	6	7	7
Points	3	6	9	9	12	13	16	16	17	20	21	21	22	25	25	28	28	28	28	28	29	29

Source: http://www.superliga.dk/
A = Away; H = Home; W = Win; D = Draw; L = Loss

==== Relegation round ====
Pos	Team	Pld	W	D	L	GF	GA	GD	Pts	
1	Copenhagen (O)	32	15	6	11	67	44	+23	51	Qualification for the European play-off match
2	OB	32	11	8	13	51	60	−9	41	
3	Silkeborg	32	10	6	16	41	67	−26	36	
4	Randers	32	9	8	15	33	47	−14	35	
5	Fredericia (R)	32	9	7	16	45	68	−23	34	Relegation to 1st Division

Source: Danish Football Association (in Danish), Soccerway
Rules for classification: 1) Points; 2) Goal difference; 3) Goals scored; 4) Away goals scored; 5) Play-off (played on neutral ground if determining teams for different rounds); 6) Draw.
(O) Play-off winners; (R) Relegated

==== Results by round - Relegation round ====
Matchday	1	2	3	4	5	6	7	8	9	10
Ground	A	H	H	A	A	H	H	A	A	H
Result	L	L	W	W	W	W	W	D	W	W
Position	8	8	8	7	7	7	7	7	7	7
Points	29	29	32	35	38	41	44	45	48	51

Updated to match(es) played on 17 May 2026. Source: http://www.superliga.dk/
A = Away; H = Home; W = Win; D = Draw; L = Loss

==== Matches ====
18 July 2025 1	Viborg	2–3	Copenhagen	Viborg
19:00 CEST	Grønning 24' (pen.); Jørgensen (yellow card) 45'; Søndergaard 73' (Grønning)	Report	Achouri 37'; Moukoko (yellow card) 45+1'; Elyounoussi 51' (Huescas); Mattsson 78' (pen.)	Stadium: Energi Viborg Arena; Attendance: 6,696; Referee: Sandi Putros

26 July 2025 2	Copenhagen	2–0	Vejle	Copenhagen
18:00 CEST	Lerager 2' (Delaney); Larsson 26' (Moukoko)	Report	Hjulsager (yellow card) 30'; Duelund (yellow card) 63'; Nielsen (yellow card) 90+5'	Stadium: Parken; Attendance: 22,403; Referee: Jakob Kehlet

1 August 2025 3	Fredericia	0–2	Copenhagen	Fredericia
18:00 CEST		Report	Achouri 34' (Delaney); Larsson 69' (Mattsson)	Stadium: Monjasa Park; Attendance: 6,288; Referee: Jacob Karlsen

8 August 2025 4	Copenhagen	2–3	AGF	Copenhagen
18:00 CEST	Hatzidiakos (yellow card) 63'; Larsson 76'; Cornelius (yellow card) 83'; Mattsson 84' (pen.)	Report	Mortensen 10' (Madsen); Bech 52'; Links 74' (yellow card) 75'; Arnstad (yellow card) 83'; Beijmo (yellow card) 90+6'; Hansen (yellow card) 90+10'	Stadium: Parken; Attendance: 28,812; Referee: Mikkel Redder

15 August 2025 5	Nordsjælland	1–3	Copenhagen	Farum
19:00 CEST	Salquist (red card) 45+1'; Amoako 46' (Egeli); Olsen (yellow card) 65'; Yirenkyi (yellow card) 86'; Markmann (yellow card) 87'	Report	Robert (yellow card) 36'; Garananga (yellow card) 57'; Moukoko 59' (Huescas); Hatzidiakos 75'; Zague (yellow card) 86' (goal) 90+4' (Elyounoussi)	Stadium: Right to Dream Park; Attendance: 6,687; Referee: Lasse Læbel Graagaard

24 August 2025 6	Copenhagen	1–1	OB	Copenhagen
18:00 CEST	Lerager (yellow card) 34'; Gabriel Pereira 88'	Report	Arp 4'; Bojang (yellow card) 57'; Falk (yellow card) 87'	Stadium: Parken; Attendance: 27,397; Referee: Jens Maae

31 August 2025 7	Randers	1–5	Copenhagen	Randers
18:00 CEST	Dyhr (yellow card) 33'; Touré (yellow card) 45+3'; Danho 55' (Lissens)	Report	López 12'; Moukoko 21' (Larsson); Elyounoussi 40' (Lerager); Achouri 45+1' (Elyounoussi); Meling (yellow card) 89'; Zague 90' (Elyounoussi)	Stadium: Cepheus Park Randers; Attendance: 5,857; Referee: Jakob A. Sundberg

13 September 2025 8	Brøndby	2–1	Copenhagen	Brøndbyvester
15:00 CEST	Gregoritsch (yellow card) 38' (goal) 45+1' (pen.); Fukuda (yellow card) 47'; Spierings 73' (Binks); Tahirović (yellow card) 81'	Report	Elyounoussi (yellow card) 33' (goal) 53' (Huescas)	Stadium: Brøndby Stadium; Attendance: 25,493; Referee: Mikkel Redder

21 September 2025 9	Copenhagen	3–3	Silkeborg	Copenhagen
16:00 CEST	Larsson 9' (pen.); Claesson 33' (Robert); Elyounoussi 46' (López) (yellow card) 86'; López (yellow card) 49'; Hatzidiakos (yellow card) 63'; Huescas (yellow card) 90+2'	Report	McCowatt 3' 58' (Bakiz) 74' (Poulsen)	Stadium: Parken; Attendance: 28,928; Referee: Michael Tykgaard

27 September 2025 10	Sønderjyske	1–2	Copenhagen	Haderslev
18:00 CEST	Hyseni (yellow card) 65'; Jensen 82' (pen.); Oggesen (yellow card) 88'	Report	Robert 29' (Elyounoussi) 56' (Huescas); Delaney (yellow card) 72'; Suzuki (yellow card) 86'; Kotarski (yellow card) 90+6'	Stadium: Sydbank Park; Attendance: 8,202; Referee: Lasse Læbel Graagaard

5 October 2025 11	Copenhagen	1–1	Midtjylland	Copenhagen
18:00 CEST	Lerager (yellow card) 78'; Garananga 80' (Larsson); (red card) 90+8'	Report	Franculino 18' (Billing) (yellow card) 53'; Júnior Brumado (yellow card) 84'	Stadium: Parken; Attendance: 30,661; Referee: Jakob A. Sundberg

17 October 2025 12	Silkeborg	3–1	Copenhagen	Silkeborg
19:00 CEST	McCowatt 27' (Larsen); Bakiz 29' (Adamsen); Gammelby 41'	Report	Hatzidiakos (yellow card) 55'; Claesson 60' (Daðason)	Stadium: JYSK Park; Attendance: 6,429; Referee: Jacob Karlsen

26 October 2025 13	Copenhagen	0–0	Viborg	Copenhagen
18:00 CET	Achouri (yellow card) 74'	Report		Stadium: Parken; Attendance: 20,545; Referee: Mads-Kristoffer Kristoffersen

1 November 2025 14	Copenhagen	3–2	Fredericia	Copenhagen
18:00 CET	Claesson 21' (Achouri); Moukoko 55' (pen.); Elyounoussi (yellow card) 59'; Suzuki 77' (Elyounoussi)	Report	Marcussen 49' (pen.); Opondo (yellow card) 54'; Buch 83' (Dall)	Stadium: Parken; Attendance: 20,760; Referee: Sandi Putros

9 November 2025 15	Vejle	2–0	Copenhagen	Vejle
14:00 CET	Bach 73' (Jacobsen); Chiakha 89' (Vestergård)	Report	Lerager (yellow card) 30'	Stadium: Vejle Stadion; Attendance: 7,541; Referee: Michael Tykgaard

23 November 2025 16	Copenhagen	1–0	Brøndby	Copenhagen
12:00 CET	Lerager (yellow card) 36'; Larsson 72' (pen.)	Report	Binks (yellow card) 29'; Ambæk (yellow card) 60'	Stadium: Parken; Attendance: 34,442; Referee: Jacob Karlsen

30 November 2025 17	AGF	2–0	Copenhagen	Vejlby
14:00 CET	Mortensen 8' (Arnstad); Arnstad (yellow card) 53'; Poulsen (yellow card) 58'; Carstensen 65'	Report	Elyounoussi (yellow card) 30'; Robert (yellow card) 54'; Gabriel Pereira (yellow card) 58'; Hatziadiakos (yellow card) 63'	Stadium: Ceres Park Vjelby; Attendance: 10,289; Referee: Mads-Kristoffer Kristoffersen

7 December 2025 18	Copenhagen	0–2	Sønderjyske	Copenhagen
18:00 CET	Delaney (yellow card) 9'; Cornelius (yellow card) 57'	Report	Oggesen (yellow card) 17'; Qamili 43'; Ingason 45+2'; Emini (yellow card) 90+5'	Stadium: Parken; Attendance: 19,977; Referee: Aydin Uslu

8 February 2026 19	Midtjylland	2–1	Copenhagen	Herning
16:00 CET	Şimşir 83'; Bak 85'	Report	Gabriel Pereira (yellow card) 29'; Elyounoussi (yellow card) 76' (goal) 90+7' (Claesson)	Stadium: MCH Arena; Attendance: 11,268; Referee: Morten Krogh

14 February 2026 20	Copenhagen	1–2	Nordsjælland	Copenhagen
17:00 CET	Elyounoussi 6'; Richardson (yellow card) 34'; Meling (yellow card) 45+3' (yellow-red card) 70'	Report	Salquist (yellow card) 25'; Solbakken 72' (pen.); Amoako 80'; Brink (yellow card) 90+4'	Stadium: Parken; Attendance: 21,007; Referee: Lasse Læbel Graagaard

21 February 2026 21	OB	2–2	Copenhagen	Odense
14:00 CET	Sørensen (yellow card) 40'; Niemiec 45' (Ganaus); Ganaus 46'; Ouédraogo (yellow card) 90+9'	Report	Richardson (yellow card) 21'; Claesson (yellow card) 52'; Larsson 65' (López); Madsen (yellow card) 90+2'; Hatziadiakos 90+7' (yellow card) 90+11'	Stadium: Nature Energy Park; Attendance: 11,255; Referee: Jakob A. Sundberg

1 March 2026 22	Copenhagen	1–2	Randers	Copenhagen
17:00 CET	Madsen 22' (Larsson); Buta (yellow card) 90+11'	Report	Dammers 17' (Greve); Pedersen (yellow card) 48'; Høegh (yellow card) 74'; Greve 90+12' (pen.)	Stadium: Parken; Attendance: 27,676; Referee: Jacob Karlsen

==== Relegation round ====
15 March 2026 23	OB	2–1	Copenhagen	Odense
14:00 CET	Falk (yellow card) 73' (goal) 87'; Askou 79'	Report	Larsson 24'	Stadium: Nature Energy Park; Attendance: 10,126; Referee: Jens Maae

22 March 2026 24	Copenhagen	1–2	Fredericia	Copenhagen
16:00 CET	Højer (yellow card) 45+3'; Moukoko 90+6' (pen.)	Report	Johannesen 23' (Etim); Crone (yellow card) 36' (yellow-red card) 90+5'; Etim 38' (Winther)	Stadium: Parken; Attendance: 19,110; Referee: Frederik Svendsen

5 April 2026 25	Copenhagen	7–0	Silkeborg	Copenhagen
18:00 CET	Moukoko 6' (Elyounoussi) 25' (Zanka) 51' (Madsen); Robert 12' (Larsson) 62' (Elyounoussi); Clem 17' (Larsson); Zanka (yellow card) 57'; Larsson 78' (Clem)	Report	McCowatt (yellow card) 57'	Stadium: Parken; Attendance: 20,372; Referee: Svend Funder

12 April 2026 26	Randers	1–2	Copenhagen	Randers
18:00 CET	Dammers (yellow card) 61'; Høegh 66' (Greve); Pedersen (yellow card) 81'	Report	Elyounoussi (yellow card) 38'; Clem (yellow card) 64' (goal) 90+1' (Cornelius); Cornelius (yellow card) 68'; Claesson 83'	Stadium: Cepheus Park Randers; Attendance: 4,925; Referee: Mads-Kristoffer Kristoffersen

19 April 2026 27	Vejle	1–4	Copenhagen	Vejle
18:00 CET	Flø (Hjulsager); Enggård (yellow card) 72'; Tabatadze (yellow card) 90+3' (yellow-red card) 90+3'	Report	Cornelius 5' (Madsen); Vianney 74' 90+4' (Robert); Daðason 88' (López)	Stadium: Vejle Stadium; Attendance: 6,160; Referee: Lasse Graagaard

22 April 2026 28	Copenhagen	v	OB	Copenhagen
18:00 CET				Stadium: Parken

=== Danish Cup ===
24 September 2025 Third tound	Lyngby	0–2	Copenhagen	Lyngby
17:45 CEST	Fraulo (yellow card) 46'; Þorvaldsson (yellow card) 68'; Kaarsbo (yellow card) 75'	Report	Hatzidiakos (yellow card) 25'; Robert (yellow card) 57'; Moukoko 59'; Claesson 70' (Hatzidiakos)	Stadium: Lyngby Stadion; Attendance: 8,214; Referee: Jakob A. Sundberg

29 October 2025 Fourth round	Hobro	1–4	Copenhagen	Hobro
17:45 CET	Andreasen 89' (Hauge)	Report	Moukoko 13' 48' (Daðason) 59' (Madsen); Daðason 90+2' (West)	Stadium: DS Arena; Attendance: 3,500; Referee: Jakob Kehlet

3 December 2025 Quarter-finals first leg	Esbjerg	2–4	Copenhagen	Esbjerg
18:00 CET	Brajanac 42' (Tjørnelund); Bjur 74' (Hansen); Kolawole (yellow card) 80'	Report	Daðason 6' (Achouri) 72' (Hatziadiakos); Elyounoussi 14' (Moukoko); Achouri 35' (Daðason)	Stadium: Blue Water Arena; Attendance: 13,205; Referee: Morten Krogh

13 December 2025 Quarter-finals second leg	Copenhagen	2–0 (6–2 agg.)	Esbjerg	Copenhagen
18:00 CET	Gabriel Pereira 20' (López); Meling (yellow card) 52'; Daðason 67' (Madsen)	Report		Stadium: Parken; Attendance: 16,351; Referee: Jakob Kehlet

11 February 2026 Semi-finals first leg	Copenhagen	2–1	Viborg	Copenhagen
19:00 CET	Clem 14'; Achouri (yellow card) 45+2'; Elyounoussi 49' (Højer)	Report	Dorian Jr. 25' (Nouck); Søndergaard (yellow card) 52'	Stadium: Parken; Attendance: 15,885; Referee: Mads-Kristoffer Kristoffersen

7 March 2026 Semi-finals second leg	Viborg	1–2 (2–4 agg.)	Copenhagen	Viborg
17:00 CET	Jørgensen 37' (Nouck)	Report	Elyounoussi (yellow card) 24'; Moukoko 28' 46'; Delaney (yellow card) 48'; Zanka (yellow card) 48'; Meling (yellow card) 69'	Stadium: Energi Viborg Arena; Attendance: 8,430; Referee: Aydin Uslu

14 May 2026 Final	Copenhagen	0–1	Midtjylland	Copenhagen
17:00 CEST	Buta (yellow card) 27'; Delaney (yellow card) 73'; López (yellow card) 81'	Report	Osorio (yellow card) 13'; Lee Han-beom 82' (Şimşir)	Stadium: Parken; Attendance: 35,485; Referee: Lasse Læbel Graagaard

=== UEFA Champions League ===
==== Second qualifying round ====
22 July 2025 First Leg	Copenhagen	2–0	(Kosovo) Drita	Copenhagen
19:00 CEST	Gabriel Pereira (yellow card) 44'; Mattsson 69' (pen.) 76' (pen.)	Report	Limaj (yellow card) 12'; Dabiqaj (yellow card) 37'; Ovouka (yellow card) 75'	Stadium: Parken; Attendance: 17,897; Referee: Martin Matosa (Slovenia)

29 July 2025 Second Leg	Drita (Kosovo)	0–1 (0–3 agg.)	Copenhagen	Pristina, Kosovo
20:00 CEST	Balaj (red card) 27'	Report	Achouri (yellow card) 5'; Delaney (yellow card) 25'; Cornelius 42' (Elyounoussi); Garananga (yellow card) 52'	Stadium: Fadil Vokrri Stadium, Pristina (Note: Drita play their home matches at the Fadil Vokrri Stadium in Pristina, instead of their regular stadium, the Gjilan City Stadium, in Gjilan, due to renovation works.); Attendance: 7,255; Referee: Miguel Nogueira (Portugal)

==== Third qualifying round ====
5 August 2025 First Leg	Malmö (Sweden)	0–0	Copenhagen	Malmö, Sweden
19:00 CEST	Đurić (yellow card) 65'	Report	Achouri (yellow card) 49'; Claesson (yellow card) 83'	Stadium: Malmö New Stadium; Attendance: 20,175; Referee: João Pinheiro (Portugal)

12 August 2025 Second Leg	Copenhagen	5–0 (5–0 agg.)	(Sweden) Malmö	Copenhagen
19:00 CEST	Huescas 31' (Cornelius); Robert 43' (Elyounoussi) 69' (Cornelius); Elyounoussi 51' (Larsson); Mattsson 67' (Elyounoussi)	Report	Rosengren (yellow card) 20'; Đurić (yellow card) 36'	Stadium: Parken; Attendance: 34,233; Referee: José María Sánchez (Spain)

==== Play-off round ====
20 August 2025 First Leg	Basel (Switzerland)	1–1	Copenhagen	Basel, Switzerland
14:00 CEST	Shaqiri 14' (pen.); Tsunemoto (yellow card) 28'; Adjetey (yellow card) 43' (yellow-red card) 82'; Leroy (yellow card) 45+2'; Barišić (yellow card) 90'	Report	Huescas (yellow card) 12'; Gabriel Pereira 45+3' (López); Lerager (yellow card) 53'; Larsson (yellow card) 62'	Stadium: St. Jakob-Park; Attendance: 25,847; Referee: Anthony Taylor (England)

27 August 2025 Second Leg	Copenhagen	2–0 (3–1 agg.)	(Switzerland) Basel	Copenhagen
21:00 CEST	Cornelius 46' (Achouri); Moukoko 84' (pen.); Claesson (yellow card) 85'	Report		Stadium: Parken; Attendance: 34,854; Referee: István Kovács (Romania)

==== League phase ====
===== League phase table =====
Pos	Team	Pld	W	D	L	GF	GA	GD	Pts
29	(Royal Spanish Football Federation) Athletic Bilbao	8	2	2	4	9	14	−5	8
30	(Italian Football Federation) Napoli	8	2	2	4	9	15	−6	8
31	(Danish Football Association) Copenhagen	8	2	2	4	12	21	−9	8
32	(Royal Dutch Football Association) Ajax	8	2	0	6	8	21	−13	6
33	(German Football Association) Eintracht Frankfurt	8	1	1	6	10	21	−11	4

Source: UEFA
Rules for classification: League phase tiebreakers

===== Results by round =====
- Matchday listings solely for opponent identification - match dates/times to be determined

Round	1	2	3	4	5	6	7	8
Ground	H	A	H	A	H	A	H	A
Result	D	L	L	L	W	W	D	L
Position	19	28	32	33	29	24	28	31
Points	1	1	1	1	4	7	8	8

Updated to match(es) played on 29 January 2026. Source: UEFA
A = Away; H = Home; W = Win; D = Draw; L = Loss; P = Postponed

18 September 2025 Matchday 1	Copenhagen	2–2	(Germany) Bayer Leverkusen	Copenhagen
18:45 CEST	Larsson 9' (Achouri); López (yellow card) 33'; Hatzidiakos (yellow card) 44'; Delaney (yellow card) 53'; Robert 86' (Huescas)	Report	Lucas Vázquez (yellow card) 62'; Álex Grimaldo 82'; Tapsoba (yellow card) 89'; Hatzidiakos 90+1' (o.g.)	Stadium: Parken; Attendance: 34,504; Referee: Aliyar Aghayev (Azerbaijan)

1 October 2025 Matchday 2	Qarabağ (Azerbaijan)	2–0	Copenhagen	Baku, Azerbaijan
18:45 CEST	Zoubir 29' (Pedro Bicalho); Matheus Silva (yellow card) 74'; Addai 83' (Akhundzade); Bayramov (yellow card) 85'; Akhundzade (yellow card) 90+3'	Report	López (yellow card) 50'	Stadium: Tofiq Bahramov Republican Stadium; Attendance: 30,250; Referee: Serdar Gözübüyük (Netherlands)

21 October 2025 Matchday 3	Copenhagen	2–4	(Germany) Borussia Dortmund	Copenhagen
21:00 CEST	Anton 33' (o.g.); Lerager (yellow card) 60'; Neestrup (yellow card) 68'; Zague (yellow card) 89'; Daðason 90' (Suzuki)	Report	Nmecha 20' (Bellingham) 76' (Chukwuemeka); Bensebaini 61' (pen.) (yellow card) 75'; Fábio Silva 87'	Stadium: Parken; Attendance: 35,058; Referee: Danny Makkelie (Netherlands)

4 November 2025 Matchday 4	Tottenham Hotspur (England)	4–0	Copenhagen	London, England
21:00 CET	Johnson 19' (Simons) (red card) 55' Kolo Muani (yellow card) 39'; Odobert 51' (Kolo Muani) van de Ven 64'; Palhinha 67' (Romero); Richarlison (penalty missed) 90+2'	Report	Gabriel Pereira (yellow card) 15'; Suzuki (yellow card) 62'; Lerager (yellow card) 90+1'	Stadium: Tottenham Hotspur Stadium; Attendance: 49,565; Referee: Erik Lambrechts (Belgium)

26 November 2025 Matchday 5	Copenhagen	3–2	(Kazakhstan) Kairat	Copenhagen
18:45 CET	Daðason 26' (Robert); Hatzidiakos (yellow card) 56'; Larsson 59' (pen.); Robert 73'; Lerager (yellow card) 90+2'	Report	Satpayev 81'; Mrynskiy (yellow card) 87'; Baybek 90' (Zaria); Tapalov (yellow card) 90+3'; Ricardinho (yellow card) 90+3'; Satpayev (yellow card) 90+4'	Stadium: Parken; Attendance: 30,231; Referee: Nick Walsh (Scotland)

10 December 2025 Matchday 6	Villarreal (Spain)	2–3	Copenhagen	Villarreal, Spain
18:45 CET	Pedraza (yellow card) 34'; Comesaña 47' (Akhomach); Oluwaseyi 56' (Pedraza); Akhomach (yellow card) 58'; Gueye (yellow card) 89'	Report	Elyounoussi 2' (López); Achouri 48' (Zague) (yellow card) 83'; Neestrup (yellow card) 59'; Cornelius (yellow card) 77' (goal) 90'	Stadium: Estadio de la Cerámica; Attendance: 17,023; Referee: Ivan Kružliak (Slovakia)

20 January 2026 Matchday 7	Copenhagen	1–1	(Italy) Napoli	Copenhagen
21:00 CET	Delaney (red card) 35'; Elyounoussi (yellow card) 42'; Larsson (penalty missed) '72 72'; Clem (yellow card) 90+7'	Report	McTominay 39' (Elmas); Højlund (yellow card) 40'; Di Lorenzo (yellow card) 82'	Stadium: Parken; Attendance: 35,022; Referee: Irfan Peljto (Bosnia and Herzegovina)

28 January 2025 Matchday 8	Barcelona (Spain)	4–1	Copenhagen	Barcelona, Spain
21:00 CET	Lamine Yamal (yellow card) 38' (goal) 60' (Fermín); Lewandowski 48' (Lamine Yamal); Raphinha 69' (pen.); Rashford 85'	Report	Daðason 4' (Elyounoussi); López (yellow card) 27'; Suzuki (yellow card) 39'; Meling (yellow card) 87'; Gabriel Pereira (yellow card) 90+3'	Stadium: Camp Nou; Attendance: 44,609; Referee: Benoît Bastien (France)

== Statistics ==
As of 19 April 2026

=== Appearances and goals ===
No.	Pos	Nat	Player	Total		Superliga		Danish Cup		Champions League	
No.	Pos	Nat	Player	Apps	Goals	Apps	Goals	Apps	Goals	Apps	Goals
1	GK	(Croatia) CRO	Dominik Kotarski	44	0	25	0	5	0	14	0
5	DF	(Brazil) BRA	Gabriel Pereira	44	3	24	1	6	1	14	1
6	DF	(Greece) GRE	Pantelis Hatzidiakos	40	2	20+3	2	2+3	0	11+1	0
7	FW	(Sweden) SWE	Viktor Claesson	42	5	11+13	4	1+4	1	2+11	0
8	MF	(Denmark) DEN	Magnus Mattsson	12	5	5+1	2	0	0	2+4	3
9	FW	(Germany) GER	Youssoufa Moukoko	37	14	14+8	7	4	6	4+7	1
10	FW	(Norway) NOR	Mohamed Elyounoussi	43	10	21+4	6	4+1	2	12+1	2
11	FW	(Sweden) SWE	Jordan Larsson	46	11	22+4	8	2+4	0	12+2	3
13	MF	(Mexico) MEX	Rodrigo Huescas	19	1	9+1	0	0+1	0	8	1
14	FW	(Denmark) DEN	Andreas Cornelius	25	4	5+10	1	0+2	0	6+2	3
15	MF	(Peru) PER	Marcos López	42	1	21+2	1	3+2	0	13+1	0
16	FW	(Brazil) BRA	Robert	35	8	14+7	4	3	0	5+6	4
17	FW	(Portugal) POR	Aurélio Buta	8	0	3+4	0	1	0	0+0	0
18	DF	(Costa Rica) CRC	Kenay Myrie	2	0	2+0	0	0	0	0+0	0
20	DF	(Japan) JPN	Junnosuke Suzuki	29	1	15+1	1	6	0	6+1	0
21	MF	(Denmark) DEN	Mads Emil Madsen	28	1	10+7	1	4+1	0	2+4	0
23	MF	(Morocco) MAR	Amir Richardson	5	0	2+2	0	0+1	0	0+0	0
24	DF	(Norway) NOR	Birger Meling	27	0	7+8	0	4+1	0	4+3	0
25	DF	(Denmark) DEN	Zanka	7	0	6+0	0	1+0	0	0+0	0
26	FW	(Norway) NOR	Liam West	1	0	0	0	0+1	0	0	0
27	MF	(Denmark) DEN	Thomas Delaney	26	0	12+4	0	1+3	0	5+1	0
30	FW	(Tunisia) TUN	Elias Achouri	32	5	12+5	3	4	1	9+2	1
31	GK	(Iceland) ISL	Rúnar Alex Rúnarsson	3	0	2+0	0	1	0	0+0	0
36	MF	(Denmark) DEN	William Clem	36	3	8+12	2	3+2	1	7+4	0
38	MF	(Denmark) DEN	Oliver Højer	6	0	2+2	0	1	0	0+1	0
39	FW	(Iceland) ISL	Viktor Daðason	23	8	4+9	1	4	4	4+2	3
44	FW	(Cameroon) CMR	Geovanni Vianney	7	2	0+7	2	0+0	0	0	0
Players who are away on loan:
4	DF	(Zimbabwe) ZIM	Munashe Garananga	12	1	3+2	1	1	0	2+4	0
23	MF	(Poland) POL	Dominik Sarapata	3	0	0	0	0+2	0	0+1	0
Players who left during the season:
12	MF	(Denmark) DEN	Lukas Lerager	31	1	14+3	1	1+2	0	11	0
17	MF	(Denmark) DEN	Victor Froholdt	1	0	1	0	0	0	0	0
18	FW	(Russia) RUS	German Onugkha	1	0	0+1	0	0	0	0	0
22	DF	(France) FRA	Yoram Zague	14	2	2+4	2	2	0	1+5	0

=== Goal scorers ===
Place	Position	Nation	Number	Name	Superliga	Danish Cup	Champions League	Total
1	FW	(Germany) (Cameroon)	9	Youssoufa Moukoko	7	6	1	14
2	FW	(Sweden)	11	Jordan Larsson	8	0	3	11
3	FW	(Norway)	10	Mohamed Elyounoussi	6	2	2	10
4	FW	(Brazil)	16	Robert	4	0	4	8
4	FW	(Iceland)	39	Viktor Daðason	1	4	3	8
6	MF	(Denmark)	8	Magnus Mattsson	2	0	3	5
6	FW	(Tunisia) (France)	30	Elias Achouri	3	1	1	5
6	FW	(Sweden)	7	Viktor Claesson	4	1	0	5
9	FW	(Denmark)	14	Andreas Cornelius	1	0	3	4
10	DF	(Brazil)	5	Gabriel Pereira	1	1	1	3
10	MF	(Denmark)	36	William Clem	2	1	0	3
12	DF	(Greece) (Netherlands)	6	Pantelis Hatzidiakos	2	0	0	2
12	FW	(Cameroon)	44	Geovanni Vianney	2	0	0	2
14	DF	(Denmark)	13	Rodrigo Huescas	0	0	1	1
14	DF	(Peru)	15	Marcos López	1	0	0	1
14	DF	(Japan)	20	Junnosuke Suzuki	1	0	0	1
14	MF	(Denmark)	21	Mads Emil Madsen	1	0	0	1
Opponent's own goal(s)					0	0	1	1
Players who are away on loan
1	DF	(Zimbabwe)	4	Munashe Garananga	1	0	0	1
Players who left during the season:
1	DF	(France)	22	Yoram Zague	2	0	0	2
2	MF	(Denmark)	12	Lukas Lerager	1	0	0	1
Total					50	16	23	89

=== Assists ===
Place	Position	Nation	Number	Name	Superliga	Danish Cup	Champions League	Total
1	FW	(Norway)	10	Mohamed Elyounoussi	7	0	4	11
2	DF	(Peru)	15	Marcos López	3	1	2	6
3	DF	(Mexico)	13	Rodrigo Huescas	4	0	1	5
4	FW	(Tunisia) (France)	30	Elias Achouri	1	1	2	4
4	FW	(Sweden)	11	Jordan Larsson	5	0	1	6
6	FW	(Iceland)	39	Viktor Daðason	1	2	0	3
6	FW	(Denmark)	14	Andreas Cornelius	1	0	2	3
6	FW	(Brazil)	16	Robert	2	0	1	3
6	MF	(Denmark)	21	Mads Emil Madsen	2	1	0	3
10	MF	(Denmark)	27	Thomas Delaney	2	0	0	2
10	DF	(Greece) (Netherlands)	6	Pantelis Hatzidiakos	0	2	0	2
10	FW	(Germany) (Cameroon)	9	Youssoufa Moukoko	1	1	0	2
13	MF	(Denmark)	8	Magnus Mattsson	1	0	0	1
13	DF	(Japan)	20	Junnosuke Suzuki	0	0	1	1
13	FW	(Norway)	26	Liam West	0	1	0	1
13	FW	(Sweden)	7	Viktor Claesson	1	0	0	1
13	DF	(Denmark)	38	Oliver Højer	0	1	0	1
13	MF	(Denmark)	36	William Clem	1	0	0	1
DF	(Denmark)	25	Zanka	1	0	0	1	
Players who left during the season:
1	MF	(Denmark)	12	Lukas Lerager	1	0	0	1
1	DF	(France)	22	Yoram Zague	0	0	1	1
Total					35	7	17	60

=== Clean sheets ===
Place	Position	Nation	Number	Name	Superliga	Danish Cup	Champions League	Total
1	GK	(Croatia)	1	Dominik Kotarski	5	2	5	12
Total					5	2	5	12

=== Hat-tricks ===
Player	Against	Result	Date	Competition	Ref
Youssoufa Moukoko	Hobro	4–1	29 October 2025	2025-26 Danish Cup	
Youssoufa Moukoko	Silkeborg	7–0	5 April 2026	2025-26 Danish Superliga	

=== Disciplinary record ===
Number	Nation	Position	Name	Superliga			Danish Cup			Champions League			Total		
Number	Nation	Position	Name	Yellow card	(yellow card) (yellow-red card)	Red card	Yellow card	(yellow card) (yellow-red card)	Red card	Yellow card	(yellow card) (yellow-red card)	Red card	Yellow card	(yellow card) (yellow-red card)	Red card
1	(Croatia)	GK	Dominik Kotarski	1	0	0	0	0	0	0	0	0	1	0	0
4	(Zimbabwe)	DF	Munashe Garananga	1	0	1	0	0	0	1	0	0	2	0	1
5	(Brazil)	DF	Gabriel Pereira	2	0	0	0	0	0	3	0	0	5	0	0
6	(Greece)	DF	Pantelis Hatzidiakos	5	0	0	1	0	0	2	0	0	8	0	0
7	(Sweden)	FW	Viktor Claesson	1	0	0	0	0	0	1	0	0	2	0	0
9	(Germany) (Cameroon)	FW	Youssoufa Moukoko	1	0	0	0	0	0	0	0	0	1	0	0
10	(Norway)	MF	Mohamed Elyounoussi	6	0	0	1	0	0	1	0	0	8	0	0
11	(Sweden)	FW	Jordan Larsson	0	0	0	0	0	0	2	0	0	2	0	0
12	(Denmark)	MF	Lukas Lerager	4	0	0	0	0	0	4	0	0	8	0	0
13	(Mexico)	DF	Rodrigo Huescas	1	0	0	0	0	0	1	0	0	2	0	0
14	(Denmark)	FW	Andreas Cornelius	3	0	0	0	0	0	1	0	0	4	0	0
15	(Peru)	DF	Marcos López	1	0	0	0	0	0	3	0	0	4	0	0
16	(Brazil)	FW	Robert	2	0	0	1	0	0	0	0	0	3	0	0
17	(Portugal)	DF	Aurélio Buta	1	0	0	0	0	0	0	0	0	1	0	0
20	(Japan)	DF	Junnosuke Suzuki	1	0	0	0	0	0	2	0	0	3	0	0
21	(Denmark)	MF	Mads Emil Madsen	1	0	0	0	0	0	0	0	0	1	0	0
22	(France)	DF	Yoram Zague	1	0	0	0	0	0	1	0	0	2	0	0
24	(Norway)	DF	Birger Meling	2	1	0	2	0	0	1	0	0	5	1	0
25	(Denmark)	DF	Zanka	1	0	0	1	0	0	0	0	0	2	0	0
27	(Denmark)	MF	Thomas Delaney	2	0	0	1	0	0	2	0	1	5	0	1
30	(Tunisia) (France)	FW	Elias Achouri	1	0	0	1	0	0	3	0	0	5	0	0
36	(Denmark)	MF	William Clem	1	0	0	0	0	0	1	0	0	2	0	0
38	(Denmark)	MF	Oliver Højer	1	0	0	0	0	0	0	0	0	1	0	0
Total				39	1	1	8	0	0	30	0	1	77	1	2

== Home attendance ==
As of 5 April 2026

Competition	Total	Games	Average
Superliga	322,090	13	24,776
Danish Cup	32,236	2	16,118
Champions League	221,799	7	31,686
Total	576,125	22	25,233
