= Arbin Zejnullai =

Albanian footballer

Personal information
- Date of birth: 15 February 1999 (age 27)
- Place of birth: Tetovo, Macedonia
- Height: 1.77 m (5 ft 10 in)
- Position: Midfielder

Team information
- Current team: Shkëndija
- Number: 17

Youth career
- –2016: Shkëndija

Senior career*
Years	Team	Apps	(Gls)
2016–2021	Shkëndija	80	(5)
2021–2022	Lokomotiva	0	(0)
2022	Rabotnički	15	(0)
2022–2025	Egnatia	107	(12)
2025–	Shkëndija	31	(3)

International career^{‡}
2017	Macedonia U18	1	(0)
2018–2019	Albania U21	7	(0)
- * Club domestic league appearances and goals as of 18 June 2026 ‡ National team caps and goals as of 14:04, 23 November 2022 (UTC)

Arbin Zejnullai (born 15 February 1999) is a professional footballer who plays as a midfielder for Shkëndija in the Macedonian First League. Born in Macedonia, he represents the Albania national team.

== Club career ==
=== Early career ===
Born in Tetovo, Zejnullai spent his youth career with local club Shkëndija, notably competing with the club's under-19 team during their first appearance in the UEFA Youth League during the 2017–18 season. The club would be eliminated during the first round, falling 2–1 on aggregate to Slovak champions Nitra. As a child, he served as a ball boy for the club.

=== Shkëndija ===
Zejnullai made his senior debut for Shkëndija in March 2016, coming on as a 75th-minute substitute for Marjan Radeski in a 4–0 league victory over Metalurg. After making just two appearances during his short opening season with the club, Zejnullai was used as a rotation option over the next few seasons, making just nine and six starts respectively in the following two league seasons. In July 2017, he scored his first competitive goal for the club, scoring late in Shkëndija's 4–0 first qualifying round victory over Dacia in the UEFA Europa League. In the process, he became the club's youngest scorer in European competition. In December of that year, he would score his first league goal for the club, scoring in the 90th minute of a 3–0 victory over Pelister. His 2017–18 was interrupted by injury in January 2018, as he suffered a broken metatarsal in training. In November 2019, Zejnullai signed a three-year contract extension with the club.

Ahead of the 2020–21 campaign, Zejnullai broke into the first team, making 28 league appearances over the course of the season. At the end of the season, Zejnullai and Shkëndija parted ways by mutual consent.

=== Rabotnički ===
After a short stint with Croatian club Lokomotiva in which he failed to make a first team appearance, Zejnullai returned to North Macedonia to join Rabotnički in January 2022. He scored his first goal for the club later that month, in a 3–0 friendly victory over Russian club Fakel Voronezh. He would make his league debut for the club in mid-February; one of just 15 competitive appearances that he'd make before leaving Rabotnički in the summer.

=== Egnatia ===
In July 2022, Zejnullai moved to Kategoria Superiore club Egnatia, signing a three-year contract. The club's seventh signing of the summer, he reportedly had an offer to remain with Rabotnički, but positive interactions with Egnatia's club president and Zejnullai's desire to play in Albania's domestic league proved strong factors. He made his competitive debut for the club on 20 August 2022, appearing in the club's opening day defeat to Partizani Tirana. In the second meeting between the two clubs, on 30 October, Zejnullai scored a brace in a 3–0 victory for Egnatia, marking his first goal for the club.

== International career ==
Born in North Macedonia, Zejnullai is also eligible to play for Albania. After initially appearing in the U18 ranks for North Macedonia, he confirmed his decision to represent Albania in 2018. In September, he was called into the U21 squad, alongside Shkëndija teammate Shefit Shefiti, for a pair of matches against Spain and Italy.

In November 2022, Zejnullai was called up to the senior national team for a friendly match against Qatar. One of four potential debutants on the roster, Zejnullai would not appear in the match.

== Career statistics ==
=== Club ===
As of match played 8 April 2024

Appearances and goals by club, season and competition
Club	Season	League			Cup		Continental		Other		Total	
Club	Season	Division	Apps	Goals	Apps	Goals	Apps	Goals	Apps	Goals	Apps	Goals
Shkëndija	2015–16	Macedonian First League	2	0	—		—		—		2	0
Shkëndija	2016–17	Macedonian First League	14	0	1 (Note: Includes appearances in the Macedonian Football Cup)	0	0	0	—		15	0
Shkëndija	2017–18	Macedonian First League	14	1	1	0	2 (Note: Includes appearances in the UEFA Europa League)	1	—		17	2
Shkëndija	2018–19	Macedonian First League	13	3	1	0	2 (Note: Includes appearances in the UEFA Champions League)	0	—		16	3
Shkëndija	2019–20	Macedonian First League	9	1	2	0	1	0	—		12	1
Shkëndija	2020–21	Macedonian First League	28	0	1	0	3	0	—		32	0
Shkëndija	2021–22	Macedonian First League	0	0	0	0	4 (Note: Two appearances in the UEFA Champions League, two appearances in the UEFA Europa Conference League)	0	—		4	0
Shkëndija	Total		80	5	6	0	12	1	—		98	6
Lokomotiva	2021–22	Croatian Football League	0	0	—		—		—		0	0
Rabotnički	2021–22	Macedonian First League	15	0	—		—		—		15	0
Egnatia	2022–23	Kategoria Superiore	33	3	8 (Note: Includes appearances in the Albanian Cup)	0	—		—		41	3
Egnatia	2023–24	Kategoria Superiore	29	6	5 (Note: Four appearances in Albanian Cup, one in Albanian Supercup)	0	2 (Note: Includes appearances in UEFA Europa Conference League)	0	—		36	6
Egnatia	Total		62	9	13	0	2	0	—		77	9
Career total			157	14	19	0	14	1	—		190	15

== Honours ==
Shkëndija

- Macedonian First League: 2017–18, 2018–19, 2020–21

Egnatia

- Albanian Cup: 2022–23, 2023–24
