= Dominik Sarapata =

Polish footballer (born 2007)

Personal information
- Date of birth: 25 October 2007 (age 19)
- Place of birth: Poland
- Height: 1.80 m (5 ft 11 in)
- Position: Midfielder

Team information
- Current team: Artis Brno (on loan from Copenhagen)
- Number: 20

Youth career
- –2020: Józefka Chorzów
- 2020–2024: Górnik Zabrze
- 2025: Copenhagen

Senior career*
Years	Team	Apps	(Gls)
2024	Górnik Zabrze II	9	(0)
2024–2025	Górnik Zabrze	16	(1)
2025–	Copenhagen	0	(0)
2026	→ Wisła Płock (loan)	7	(0)
2026–	→ Artis Brno (loan)	7	(1)

International career^{‡}
2022	Poland U15	1	(0)
2022–2023	Poland U16	4	(0)
2023–2024	Poland U17	15	(0)
2024–2025	Poland U18	10	(1)
2025–2026	Poland U19	11	(0)
- * Club domestic league appearances and goals as of 15:58, 21 November 2026 (UTC) ‡ National team caps and goals as of 19:29, 31 March 2026 (UTC)

Dominik Sarapata (born 25 October 2007) is a Polish professional footballer who plays as a midfielder for Czech First League club Artis Brno, on loan from Copenhagen.

== Club career ==
As a youth player, Sarapata joined the youth academy of Polish side Józefka Chorzów. In 2020, he joined the youth academy of Polish side Górnik Zabrze and was promoted to the club's senior team in 2024, where he made sixteen league appearances and scored one goal. On 2 February 2025, he debuted for them during a 1–1 home draw with Puszcza Niepołomice in the league. Danish newspaper Tipsbladet wrote in 2025 that he was "one of the biggest talents in Polish football" while playing for the club.

On 20 June 2025, Sarapata moved to Danish side Copenhagen on a four-year deal, for a reported fee of €4 million. On 27 January 2026, Sarapata extended his contract with Copenhagen until the summer of 2029 and was loaned to Polish Ekstraklasa club Wisła Płock for the remainder of the season. He made seven league appearances for Wisła, and returned to Copenhagen after the season concluded. On 2 September 2026, he moved on a season-long loan to Czech club Artis Brno.

== International career ==
Sarapata is a Poland youth international. In the summer of 2024, he represented the Poland under-17s at the 2024 UEFA European Under-17 Championship.

== Career statistics ==
As of match played 23 May 2026

Appearances and goals by club, season and competition
Club	Season	League			National cup (Note: Includes Danish Cup)		Europe		Other		Total	
Club	Season	Division	Apps	Goals	Apps	Goals	Apps	Goals	Apps	Goals	Apps	Goals
Górnik Zabrze II	2024–25	III liga, group III	9	0	0	0	—		—		9	0
Górnik Zabrze	2024–25	Ekstraklasa	16	1	0	0	—		—		16	1
Copenhagen	2025–26	Danish Superliga	0	0	2	0	1 (Note: Appearance in UEFA Champions League)	0	—		3	0
Wisła Płock (loan)	2025–26	Ekstraklasa	7	0	—		—		—		7	0
Artis Brno (loan)	2026–27	Czech First League	0	0	0	0	—		—		0	0
Career total			32	1	2	0	1	0	0	0	35	1
