= KF Veleshta =

FK Veleshta
- Full name: Klubi Futbollistik Veleshta
- Founded: 1956; 69 years ago
- Dissolved: 2022
- Ground: Stadion Velešta
- Capacity: 1,000
- Manager: Daniel Stojanovski
- League: Macedonian Second Football League
- 2021/22: 9th (relegated)
Home colours

KF Veleshta (Macedonian: ФК Велешта, FK Veleshta) is a football club based in the village of Veleshtë, Struga, North Macedonia. In their last season they competed in the Macedonian Second League West.

== History ==
The club was founded in 1956.

The club played in the Macedonian Second League.

In 2014–15 season they played play-off for qualifying in Macedonian Second League but lost in two matches vs Ljubanci (4–1 and 3–0). In 2020, KF Veleshta competed in the second Macedonian football league by winning play-off qualifying round vs KF Besa Dobërdoll [3-1].

== Notable players ==
- (North Macedonia) Besmir Bojku
- (North Macedonia) (Albania) Nijaz Lena

== Current squad ==
As of 12 July 2021.

Note: Flags indicate national team as defined under FIFA eligibility rules; some limited exceptions apply. Players may hold more than one non-FIFA nationality.

No.	Pos.	Nation	Player
1	GK	MKD	Nuhi Jonuz
2	DF	MKD	Samed Kadrioski
3	DF	MKD	muharrem mislimi
4	DF	MKD	Ilirid Nasufi
5	DF	MKD	Ermin Anrushi
6	MF	MKD	Mirlind Dauti
7	ST	MKD	stojancho velinov
10	ST	MKD	Dieli Kaba
11	MF	MKD	hamza rrahmani

No.	Pos.	Nation	Player
12	MF	MKD	Bujamin Asani
14	ST	MKD	Agon Hajredini
15	MF	MKD	ilija dalceski
16	ST	MKD	azdren mena
17	ST	MKD	maleski hristijan
18	MF	MKD	Ermir Nura
42	GK	MKD	Bledar Istrefi
34	ST	MKD	rexhepi nexhmi
—	DF	MKD	Sasho Gjoreski
—	ST	MKD	elmaz sheji
—	ST	MKD	fikri dani
