= Yoram Zague =

French footballer (born 2006)

Personal information
- Date of birth: 15 May 2006 (age 20)
- Place of birth: Paris, France
- Height: 1.68 m (5 ft 6 in)
- Position: Right-back

Team information
- Current team: Pafos (on loan from Paris Saint-Germain)
- Number: 2

Youth career
- 2012–2014: AJN Bagnolet
- 2014–2019: Paris FC
- 2019–2025: Paris Saint-Germain

Senior career*
Years	Team	Apps	(Gls)
2024–	Paris Saint-Germain	9	(1)
2025–2026	→ Copenhagen (loan)	7	(2)
2026	→ Eupen (loan)	8	(2)
2026–	→ Pafos (loan)	5	(1)

International career^{‡}
2022–2023	France U17	6	(0)
2023	France U18	11	(0)
2024–2025	France U19	11	(1)
Medal record
Men's football
Representing France
FIFA U-17 World Cup
Runner-up	2023 Indonesia
- * Club domestic league appearances and goals as of 13 October 2026 ‡ National team caps and goals as of 25 March 2025

Yoram Zague (born 15 May 2006) is a French professional footballer who plays as a right-back for Cypriot First Division club Pafos, on loan from Ligue 1 club Paris Saint-Germain.

== Club career ==
Initially a youth player at AJN Bagnolet and Paris FC, Zague joined Paris Saint-Germain (PSG) in 2019, entering the club's academy. On 4 August 2023, it was announced that he had signed his first professional contract with PSG, which would take effect on 1 July 2024 and last until 30 June 2027. During the 2023–24 season, he established himself as the captain of the PSG under-19s, under the direction of head coach Zoumana Camara. On 6 April 2024, Zague made his professional and Ligue 1 debut for PSG in a 1–1 draw against Clermont, playing the full 90 minutes. On his 18th birthday on 15 May, he scored his first goal for PSG in a 2–1 win over Nice.

On 7 February 2025, Zague signed a contract extension with PSG until 2028. On 24 June 2025, he was loaned out to Danish Superliga club Copenhagen until June 2026, with an option for the deal to be made permanent. On 31 January 2026, Zague moved on a new loan to Eupen in the Belgian second-tier Challenger Pro League. On 25 August 2026, was loaned out to Cypriot First Division club Pafos for the 2026–27 season, with the deal containing an option to buy.

== International career ==
On 31 October 2023, Zague was called up to the France under-17s for the 2023 FIFA U-17 World Cup held in Indonesia. The team went on to qualify for the final for the second time in history, and was eventually defeated by Germany in a penalty shoot-out.

== Personal life ==
Born in Paris, France, Zague is of Ivorian descent.

When Zague played for Danish side FC Copenhagen he drove over 100% too fast in his BMW in a 50 KM zone. On 20 April 2026, he was sentenced in Copenhagen City Court to 20 days in prison, an unconditional suspension of his driving license for 3 years, and a warning about deportation.

== Career statistics ==
As of 11 October 2026

Appearances and goals by club, season and competition
Club	Season	League			Cup		Continental		Other		Total	
Club	Season	Division	Apps	Goals	Apps	Goals	Apps	Goals	Apps	Goals	Apps	Goals
Paris Saint-Germain	2023–24	Ligue 1	5	1	0	0	0	0	0	0	5	1
Paris Saint-Germain	2024–25	Ligue 1	4	0	2	0	0	0	0	0	6	0
Paris Saint-Germain	Total		9	1	2	0	0	0	0	0	11	1
Copenhagen (loan)	2025–26	Danish Superliga	7	2	2	0	6 (Note: Appearances in UEFA Champions League)	0	—		15	2
Eupen (loan)	2025–26	Challenger Pro League	8	2	—		—		—		8	2
Pafos (loan)	2026–27	Cypriot First Division	5	1	0	0	0	0	1 (Note: Appearance in Cypriot Super Cup)	0	6	1
Career total			29	6	4	0	6	0	1	0	40	6

== Honours ==
Paris Saint-Germain U19

- Championnat National U19: 2023–24, 2024–25

Paris Saint-Germain

- Ligue 1: 2023–24, 2024–25
- Coupe de France: 2024–25
- Trophée des Champions: 2024

Pafos

- Cypriot Super Cup: 2026

France U17

- FIFA U-17 World Cup runner-up: 2023

France U18

- Lafarge Foot Avenir: 2023
