= Viktor Daðason =

Icelandic footballer (born 2008)

Personal information
- Full name: Viktor Bjarki Daðason
- Date of birth: 30 June 2008 (age 18)
- Place of birth: Iceland
- Height: 1.93 m (6 ft 4 in)
- Position: Forward

Team information
- Current team: FC Copenhagen
- Number: 39

Youth career
- Fram Reykjavik

Senior career*
Years	Team	Apps	(Gls)
2023–2024	Fram Reykjavik	9	(1)
2024–	Copenhagen	27	(4)

International career^{‡}
2022	Iceland U15	3	(1)
2023–2024	Iceland U16	5	(3)
2023–2025	Iceland U17	8	(1)
2024–2026	Iceland U19	8	(2)
2026–	Iceland U21	5	(2)
- * Club domestic league appearances and goals as of 26 October 2026 ‡ National team caps and goals as of 6 October 2026

Viktor Bjarki Daðason (born 30 June 2008) is an Icelandic professional footballer who plays as a forward for Copenhagen.

== Club career ==
Viktor is a youth product of Fram Reykjavik where he started his senior career. On 29 April 2024, he scored his first senior goal in a 1–1 away draw with Valur.

In 2024, he signed for FC Copenhagen in the Danish Superliga. After impressing with the under-19, Viktor joined the club's first team in the early 2025–26 season, making his professional debut with FC Copenhagen in a 3–1 Danish Superliga loss to Silkeborg IF on 17 October 2025. A few days later, on 21 October, he scored his first UEFA Champions League goal in a 4–2 defeat against Borussia Dortmund, becoming the third-youngest scorer in the competition at 17 years and 113 days old, only behind Ansu Fati and Lamine Yamal. On 26 November 2025, Viktor became the youngest player in the history of the UEFA Champions league to score two goals with his strike in a 3–2 win against Kairat.

== International career ==
Viktor is a youth international for Iceland, having played for the under-15, under-16, under-17, under-19 and most recently the under-21.

== Career statistics ==
=== Club ===
As of match played 29 October 2026

Appearances and goals by club, season and competition
Club	Season	League			National cup (Note: Includes Mjólkurbikarinn)		League cup (Note: Includes Lengjubikarinn)		Europe		Total	
Club	Season	Division	Apps	Goals	Apps	Goals	Apps	Goals	Apps	Goals	Apps	Goals
Fram Reykjavik	2024	Besta deild karla	9	1	1	0	3	0	—		13	1
Copenhagen	2025–26	Danish Superliga	18	3	5	4	—		6 (Note: Appearances in UEFA Champions League)	3	29	10
Copenhagen	2026–27	Danish Superliga	9	1	2	1	—		4 (Note: Appearances in UEFA Conference League)	0	15	2
Copenhagen	Total		27	4	7	5	—		10	3	44	12
Career total			36	5	8	5	3	0	10	3	57	13
