= 2021–22 Macedonian First Football League =

Macedonian First League
- Season: 2021–22
- Dates: 10 August 2021 – 15 May 2022
- Champions: Shkupi; 1st domestic title
- Relegated: Borec; Pelister
- Champions League: Shkupi
- Europa Conference League: Akademija Pandev; Shkëndija; Makedonija G.P.
- Matches: 198
- Goals: 469 (2.37 per match)
- Top goalscorer: Sunday Adetunji (20 goals)
- Biggest home win: Shkupi 5–0 Pelister (21 November 2021); Akademija Pandev 5–0 Skopje (20 February 2022); Akademija Pandev 5–0 Borec (9 March 2022); Tikvesh 5–0 Borec (23 April 2022)
- Biggest away win: Pelister 0–3 Bregalnica (24 October 2021); Borec 1–4 Renova (21 November 2021)
- Highest scoring: Renova 5–2 Bregalnica (26 September 2021)
- Longest winning run: 6 games Makedonija G.P. Shkupi
- Longest unbeaten run: 16 games Shkupi
- Longest winless run: 23 games Pelister
- Longest losing run: 5 games Borec; Pelister
- All statistics correct as of 21 May 2022.

The 2021–22 Macedonian First League was the 30th season of the Macedonian First Football League, the highest football league of North Macedonia. It began on 8 August 2021 and ended on 15 May 2022. Shkëndija are the defending champions, having won their fourth title in 2020–21.

== Promotion and relegation ==
At the end of the 2020–21 season

Promoted from 2020–21 Second League

- Bregalnica Shtip (First placed; East)
- Skopje (First placed; West)
- Tikvesh (Second placed; East; won play-off)

Relegated to 2021–22 Second League

- Sileks (9th; lost play-off)
- Vardar (11th)
- Belasica (12th)

At the end of the 2021–22 season

Promoted from 2021–22 Second League

- Pobeda (First placed; East)
- Sileks (First placed; West)

Relegated to 2022–23 Second League

- Borec (11th)
- Pelister (12th)
- Renova (5th)^{1}

1 Renova withdrew from the First League due to financial reasons.

== Participating teams ==
Location of teams in 2021–22 Macedonian First League

| Akademija Pandev | Borec | Bregalnica | Makedonija G.P. | Pelister | Rabotnički |
|---|---|---|---|---|---|
| Blagoj Istatov Stadium; UEFA | Zoran Paunov Stadium | City Stadium Štip | Gjorče Petrov Stadium | Petar Miloševski Stadium | Toše Proeski Arena; UEFA |
| Capacity: 9,200 | Capacity: 2,000 | Capacity: 4,000 | Capacity: 3,000 | Capacity: 9,100 | Capacity: 36,460 |
| Renova Shkëndija | Shkupi | Skopje | Struga | Tikvesh | |
| Tetovo Stadium | Čair Stadium Skopje | Železarnica Stadium | Gradska Plaža Stadium | City Stadium Kavadarci | |
| Capacity: 15,000 | Capacity: 6,000 | Capacity: 3,000 | Capacity: 2,500 | Capacity: 7,500 | |

=== Personnel and kits ===
Note: Flags indicate national team as has been defined under FIFA eligibility rules. Players may hold more than one non-FIFA nationality.

| Team | Manager | Captain | Kit manufacturer | Shirt sponsor |
|---|---|---|---|---|
| Akademija Pandev | Vacant | (North Macedonia) Tomislav Iliev | Sportika SA | Strumka, JOXX, Elenica |
| Borec | (North Macedonia) Borche Hristov | (North Macedonia) Gjorgji Gjorgjiev | Legea | Brako |
| Bregalnica | (North Macedonia) Ilčo Gjorgioski | (North Macedonia) Daniel Mojsov | Puma | Gogov Hotel |
| Makedonija G.P. | (North Macedonia) Aleksandar Tanevski | (North Macedonia) Bobi Bozhinovski | Givova | betinasia, Tesla |
| Pelister | (North Macedonia) Marjan Sekulovski | (North Macedonia) Borche Manevski | Legea | SN Broker |
| Rabotnički | (North Macedonia) Aleksandar Vlaho | (North Macedonia) Kristijan Stojkoski | Joma | Seavus |
| Renova | (North Macedonia) Qatip Osmani | (North Macedonia) Argjent Gafuri | Jako | Renova |
| Shkëndija | (Bosnia and Herzegovina) Bruno Akrapović | (North Macedonia) Egzon Bejtulai | Macron | Ecolog |
| Shkupi | (North Macedonia) Goce Sedloski | (North Macedonia) Fati Ismaili | Sunrise | – |
| Skopje | (North Macedonia) Ljupcho Markovski | (North Macedonia) Hristijan Kirovski | Givova | bet2day |
| Struga | (North Macedonia) Srgjan Zaharievski | (North Macedonia) Bunjamin Shabani | Macron | Trim & Lum |
| Tikvesh | (North Macedonia) Vlatko Kostov | (North Macedonia) Aleksandar Varelovski | Joma | Klimi.mk, Sinalco |

== League table ==
| Pos | Team | Pld | W | D | L | GF | GA | GD | Pts | Qualification or relegation |
|---|---|---|---|---|---|---|---|---|---|---|
| 1 | Shkupi (C) | 33 | 23 | 7 | 3 | 66 | 21 | +45 | 76 | Qualification to Champions League first qualifying round |
| 2 | Akademija Pandev | 33 | 19 | 7 | 7 | 55 | 32 | +23 | 64 | Qualification to Europa Conference League first qualifying round |
| 3 | Shkëndija | 33 | 16 | 13 | 4 | 49 | 25 | +24 | 61 | Qualification to Europa Conference League first qualifying round |
| 4 | Makedonija G.P. | 33 | 17 | 6 | 10 | 46 | 44 | +2 | 57 | Qualification to Europa Conference League second qualifying round (Note: Makedonija G.P. qualified for the Europa Conference League second qualifying round by winning the 2021–22 Macedonian Football Cup.) |
| 5 | Renova | 33 | 12 | 12 | 9 | 42 | 29 | +13 | 48 | |
| 6 | Struga | 33 | 12 | 11 | 10 | 33 | 33 | 0 | 47 | |
| 7 | Bregalnica | 33 | 12 | 9 | 12 | 45 | 47 | −2 | 45 | |
| 8 | Rabotnički | 33 | 13 | 4 | 16 | 29 | 35 | −6 | 43 | |
| 9 | Skopje (O) | 33 | 9 | 8 | 16 | 27 | 45 | −18 | 35 | Qualification to Relegation play-off |
| 10 | Tikvesh (O) | 33 | 9 | 7 | 17 | 36 | 38 | −2 | 34 | Qualification to Relegation play-off |
| 11 | Borec (R) | 33 | 5 | 6 | 22 | 25 | 66 | −41 | 21 | Relegation to Macedonian Second League |
| 12 | Pelister (R) | 33 | 2 | 8 | 23 | 16 | 54 | −38 | 14 | Relegation to Macedonian Second League |

Source: MacedonianFootball.com, Soccerway
Rules for classification: 1) Points; 2) Goal difference; 3) Goals scored; 4) Head-to-head points; 5) Head-to-head goal difference; 6) Head-to-head away goals scored (only if two teams); 7) Head-to-head goals scored; 8) Draw; 9) Play-off. (Note: Criteria 2, 3 and 8 is only used if not deciding Champion, teams for UEFA competitions or relegation).
(C) Champions; (O) Play-off winners; (R) Relegated

== Results ==
Every team will play three times against each other team for a total of 33 matches. The first 22 matchdays will consist of a regular double round-robin schedule. The league standings at this point will then be used to determine the games for the last 11 matchdays.

| Home \ Away | AKA | BOR | BRE | MGP | PEL | RAB | REN | SKE | SKU | SKO | STR | TIK | AKA | BOR | BRE | MGP | PEL | RAB | REN | SKE | SKU | SKO | STR | TIK |
|---|---|---|---|---|---|---|---|---|---|---|---|---|---|---|---|---|---|---|---|---|---|---|---|---|
| Akademija Pandev | — | 5–0 | 0–0 | 4–1 | 1–0 | 2–0 | 2–1 | 2–1 | 1–3 | 5–0 | 1–1 | 3–2 | — | — | 2–1 | — | 2–0 | 2–1 | — | 4–2 | — | 1–2 | 1–0 | — |
| Borec | 1–2 | — | 1–1 | 1–1 | 2–1 | 0–1 | 1–4 | 0–3 | 0–3 | 0–2 | 0–1 | 2–1 | 1–1 | — | — | 0–1 | — | — | 1–5 | — | — | 1–0 | 2–0 | — |
| Bregalnica | 3–2 | 2–1 | — | 4–1 | 2–1 | 1–2 | 1–2 | 3–3 | 0–0 | 2–1 | 1–0 | 2–0 | — | 3–0 | — | — | — | 0–3 | 2–2 | 0–0 | 4–1 | — | — | 1–0 |
| Makedonija G.P. | 4–1 | 3–2 | 2–1 | — | 1–0 | 0–2 | 1–1 | 1–2 | 2–1 | 5–1 | 1–1 | 1–0 | 1–0 | — | 1–1 | — | 2–0 | 1–0 | — | — | — | 1–1 | 1–3 | — |
| Pelister | 0–0 | 1–3 | 0–3 | 0–2 | — | 0–2 | 1–1 | 2–2 | 0–2 | 0–0 | 0–1 | 0–0 | — | 2–1 | 1–0 | — | — | — | — | 0–2 | 0–1 | — | — | 1–1 |
| Rabotnički | 0–3 | 1–0 | 2–0 | 1–2 | 1–1 | — | 0–0 | 2–1 | 0–1 | 0–1 | 0–0 | 2–1 | — | 2–1 | — | — | 2–1 | — | — | — | — | 0–1 | 1–3 | 1–0 |
| Renova | 1–2 | 2–0 | 5–2 | 0–1 | 2–0 | 1–1 | — | 0–1 | 0–0 | 1–1 | 1–0 | 1–1 | 0–1 | — | — | 0–1 | 0–0 | 2–1 | — | — | — | 2–0 | 1–1 | — |
| Shkëndija | 0–0 | 3–0 | 1–0 | 4–0 | 2–1 | 2–0 | 1–2 | — | 0–0 | 1–0 | 3–1 | 1–1 | — | 0–0 | — | 3–1 | — | 1–0 | 1–1 | — | 0–0 | — | — | 2–1 |
| Shkupi | 2–1 | 3–0 | 5–0 | 2–0 | 5–0 | 2–0 | 2–1 | 1–1 | — | 4–1 | 4–0 | 3–2 | 3–0 | 3–1 | — | 1–1 | — | 2–0 | 2–0 | — | — | — | — | 1–0 |
| Skopje | 0–0 | 1–1 | 0–0 | 1–2 | 1–0 | 0–1 | 0–0 | 0–2 | 1–3 | — | 1–0 | 2–1 | — | — | 4–1 | — | 4–2 | — | — | 0–2 | 0–0 | — | — | 1–2 |
| Struga | 0–0 | 1–1 | 1–1 | 1–3 | 1–0 | 1–0 | 1–0 | 1–1 | 4–2 | 1–0 | — | 0–0 | — | — | 1–0 | — | 4–0 | — | — | 1–1 | 1–3 | 1–0 | — | — |
| Tikvesh | 0–2 | 2–1 | 1–3 | 3–0 | 1–0 | 2–0 | 0–2 | 0–0 | 0–1 | 3–0 | 1–1 | — | 1–2 | 5–0 | — | 2–1 | — | — | 0–1 | — | — | — | 2–0 | — |

Source: MacedonianFootball.com, Soccerway
Legend: Blue = home team win; Yellow = draw; Red = away team win.

=== Positions by round ===
The table lists the positions of teams after each week of matches. In order to preserve chronological evolvements, any postponed matches are not included to the round at which they were originally scheduled, but added to the full round they were played immediately afterwards.

| Team ╲ Round | 1 | 2 | 3 | 4 | 5 | 6 | 7 | 8 | 9 | 10 | 11 | 12 | 13 | 14 | 15 | 16 | 17 | 18 | 19 | 20 | 21 | 22 | 23 | 24 | 25 | 26 | 27 | 28 | 29 | 30 | 31 | 32 | 33 |
|---|---|---|---|---|---|---|---|---|---|---|---|---|---|---|---|---|---|---|---|---|---|---|---|---|---|---|---|---|---|---|---|---|---|
| Shkupi | 9 | 2 | 2 | 4 | 1 | 3 | 1 | 1 | 1 | 1 | 1 | 1 | 1 | 1 | 1 | 1 | 1 | 1 | 1 | 1 | 1 | 1 | 1 | 1 | 1 | 1 | 1 | 1 | 1 | 1 | 1 | 1 | 1 |
| Akademija Pandev | 3 | 1 | 1 | 1 | 2 | 1 | 2 | 4 | 3 | 3 | 3 | 3 | 2 | 2 | 2 | 2 | 2 | 2 | 3 | 3 | 3 | 2 | 2 | 2 | 3 | 3 | 3 | 2 | 2 | 3 | 2 | 2 | 2 |
| Shkëndija | 8 | 10 | 9 | 7 | 8 | 7 | 6 | 6 | 5 | 6 | 5 | 5 | 5 | 4 | 3 | 3 | 3 | 3 | 2 | 2 | 2 | 3 | 3 | 3 | 2 | 2 | 2 | 3 | 3 | 2 | 3 | 3 | 3 |
| Makedonija G.P. | 1 | 6 | 4 | 6 | 4 | 6 | 8 | 8 | 8 | 9 | 9 | 9 | 8 | 7 | 7 | 7 | 6 | 6 | 5 | 4 | 4 | 4 | 4 | 4 | 4 | 4 | 4 | 4 | 4 | 4 | 4 | 4 | 4 |
| Renova | 4 | 3 | 3 | 3 | 5 | 4 | 3 | 2 | 2 | 2 | 2 | 2 | 3 | 3 | 4 | 4 | 4 | 5 | 4 | 5 | 5 | 6 | 6 | 5 | 5 | 5 | 5 | 6 | 7 | 7 | 6 | 6 | 5 |
| Struga | 6 | 4 | 5 | 2 | 3 | 2 | 5 | 5 | 6 | 7 | 6 | 7 | 6 | 5 | 6 | 6 | 7 | 7 | 7 | 7 | 7 | 8 | 8 | 8 | 7 | 8 | 8 | 8 | 6 | 6 | 5 | 5 | 6 |
| Bregalnica | 7 | 9 | 7 | 9 | 7 | 8 | 7 | 7 | 7 | 4 | 4 | 4 | 4 | 6 | 5 | 5 | 5 | 4 | 6 | 6 | 6 | 5 | 5 | 6 | 6 | 6 | 6 | 5 | 5 | 5 | 7 | 7 | 7 |
| Rabotnički | 2 | 7 | 6 | 5 | 6 | 5 | 4 | 3 | 4 | 5 | 7 | 6 | 7 | 8 | 8 | 8 | 8 | 8 | 8 | 8 | 8 | 7 | 7 | 7 | 8 | 7 | 7 | 7 | 8 | 8 | 8 | 8 | 8 |
| Skopje | 5 | 8 | 10 | 8 | 9 | 10 | 10 | 9 | 9 | 8 | 8 | 8 | 9 | 9 | 9 | 9 | 9 | 9 | 9 | 9 | 9 | 10 | 9 | 9 | 9 | 9 | 9 | 10 | 10 | 10 | 9 | 9 | 9 |
| Tikvesh | 10 | 11 | 11 | 11 | 11 | 11 | 12 | 11 | 11 | 11 | 11 | 11 | 10 | 10 | 10 | 10 | 10 | 10 | 10 | 10 | 10 | 9 | 10 | 10 | 10 | 10 | 10 | 9 | 9 | 9 | 10 | 10 | 10 |
| Borec | 11 | 5 | 8 | 10 | 10 | 9 | 9 | 10 | 10 | 10 | 10 | 10 | 11 | 11 | 11 | 11 | 11 | 11 | 11 | 11 | 11 | 11 | 11 | 11 | 11 | 11 | 11 | 11 | 11 | 11 | 11 | 11 | 11 |
| Pelister | 12 | 12 | 12 | 12 | 12 | 12 | 11 | 12 | 12 | 12 | 12 | 12 | 12 | 12 | 12 | 12 | 12 | 12 | 12 | 12 | 12 | 12 | 12 | 12 | 12 | 12 | 12 | 12 | 12 | 12 | 12 | 12 | 12 |

| Leader and qualification for the Champions League first qualifying round |
| Qualification for the Europa Conference League first qualifying round |
| Qualification for the Relegation play-off |
| Relegation to the Macedonian Second League |

Source: macedonianfootball.com, Soccerway

== Relegation play-offs ==
22 May 2022
17:00 CEST

| Skopje | 2–1 | Belasica |
|---|---|---|
| Janevski 33', 88' | Report | Trajkov 53' |

Gradski stadion, Shtip
Referee: Stojanche Trpchevski (Kavadarci)

22 May 2022
17:00 CEST

| Tikvesh | 4–1 | Voska Sport |
|---|---|---|
| Spahiu 13', 74'; Ivanovski 17'; Ljamchevski 68' | Report | Emini 43' |

Stadion Blagoj Istatov, Strumica
Referee: Aleksandar Stavrev (Skopje)

== Season statistics ==
=== Top scorers ===
As of 21 May 2022

| Rank | Player | Club | Goals |
|---|---|---|---|
| 1 | (Nigeria) Sunday Adetunji | Shkupi | 20 |
| 2 | (North Macedonia) Martin Mirčevski | Akademija Pandev | 16 |
| 3 | (North Macedonia) Remzifaik Selmani | Renova | 15 |
| 4 | (North Macedonia) Ermedin Adem | Makedonija G.P. | 11 |
| 5 | (North Macedonia) Marjan Altiparmakovski | Bregalnica | 10 |
| 5 | (Albania) Sindrit Guri | Shkëndija | 10 |
| 5 | (North Macedonia) Ljupcho Doriev | Shkëndija | 10 |
| 8 | (Serbia) Milan Đokić | Bregalnica | 9 |
| 8 | (North Macedonia) Martin Stojanov | Bregalnica | 9 |
| 10 | (Costa Rica) Freddy Álvarez | Shkupi | 8 |
| 10 | (Cameroon) Anael Barga | Tikvesh | 8 |
| 10 | (Serbia) Nemanja Bosančić | Struga | 8 |
| 10 | (North Macedonia) Sefer Emini | Makedonija G.P. | 8 |
| 10 | (North Macedonia) Arbi Vosha | Makedonija G.P. | 8 |

== See also ==
- 2021–22 Macedonian Football Cup
- 2021–22 Macedonian Second Football League
