= Oliver Højer =

Danish footballer (born 2007)

Personal information
- Date of birth: 24 January 2007 (age 19)
- Place of birth: Copenhagen, Denmark
- Height: 1.82 m (6 ft 0 in)
- Position: Midfielder

Team information
- Current team: Lyngby (on loan from Copenhagen)
- Number: 5

Youth career
- Copenhagen

Senior career*
Years	Team	Apps	(Gls)
2024–	Copenhagen	7	(0)
2026–	→ Lyngby (loan)	0	(0)

International career^{‡}
2022	Denmark U16	4	(0)
2024	Denmark U17	10	(4)
2024	Denmark U18	2	(1)
2024–	Denmark U19	9	(1)
- * Club domestic league appearances and goals as of 16:00, 17 May 2026 (UTC) ‡ National team caps and goals as of 21:04, 31 March 2026 (UTC)

Oliver Højer (born 24 January 2007) is a Danish footballer who plays as a midfielder for Danish Superliga club Lyngby on loan from Copenhagen.

== Club career ==
=== Copenhagen ===
Højer is a product of F.C. Copenhagen, where he played throughout his youth. Here he worked his way up through the club's academy. In January 2024, Højer extended his contract with Copenhagen.

On 5 May 2024, 17-year-old Højer was on the bench for Copenhagen's first team for the first time in a Danish Superliga match against Silkeborg IF. In July 2024, Højer, along with teammate Amin Chiakha, was permanently promoted to the first team squad after attending a training camp with the team in Austria.

He made his Copenhagen debut on 25 July 2024, substituting for Magnus Mattsson in a UEFA Conference League qualifier against FC Bruno Magpies. In the return match on 1 August 2024, he made his debut at Parken Stadium, again substituting for Mattsson and scoring his first goal for the club.

On 11 August 2024, Højer made his Danish Superliga debut in a match against Sønderjyske.

On 2 February 2025, Copenhagen announced that Højer had been injured and was facing surgery. He returned to action until January 2026, when he made his comeback in a friendly match, in which he also scored.

== Personal life ==
Oliver Højer is the son of former footballer Lars Højer, who made 211 appearances for F.C. Copenhagen from 1992 to 1999, and the younger brother of Casper Højer, who is also a footballer.

== Career statistics ==
=== Club ===
As of match played 17 May 2026

Appearances and goals by club, season and competition
Club	Season	League			Cup		Europe		Other		Total	
Club	Season	Division	Apps	Goals	Apps	Goals	Apps	Goals	Apps	Goals	Apps	Goals
Copenhagen	2024–25	Danish Superliga	2	0	1	0	3 (Note: Appearances in UEFA Conference League)	1	0	0	6	1
Copenhagen	2025–26	Danish Superliga	5	0	1	0	1 (Note: Appearance in UEFA Champions League)	0	—		7	0
Career total			7	0	2	0	4	1	0	0	13	1

== Honours ==
Copenhagen

- Danish Superliga: 2024–25
- Danish Cup: 2024–25
