= Dobri Dol, Vrapčište =

Dobri Dol Добри Дол Dobërdoll
- Village
- Location within North Macedonia
- Coordinates: 41°51′57″N 20°53′15″E
- Country: North Macedonia
- Region: Polog
- Municipality: Vrapčište

Population (2021)
  - Total: 3,546
- Time zone: UTC+1 (CET)
  - Summer (DST): UTC+2 (CEST)
- Car plates: GV
- Website: .

Dobri Dol (Macedonian: Добри Дол, Albanian: Lugina e mirë or Dobërdoll) is a village in the municipality of Vrapčište, North Macedonia. It used to be part of Negotino-Pološko Municipality.

== History ==
Dobri Dol is attested in the 1467/68 Ottoman tax registry (defter) for the Nahiyah of Kalkandelen. The village had a total of 68 Christian households, 3 bachelors and 2 widows.

In statistics gathered by Vasil Kanchov in 1900, the village of Dobri Dol was inhabited by 940 Muslim Albanians.

== Demographics ==
As of the 2021 census, Dobri Dol had 3,546 residents with the following ethnic composition:

- Albanians 3,401
- Persons for whom data are taken from administrative sources 137
- Others 6
- Macedonians 2

According to the 2002 census, the village had a total of 5,223 inhabitants. Ethnic groups in the village include:

- Albanians 5,206
- Macedonians 2
- Turks 1
- Others 14

According to the 1942 Albanian census, Dobri Dol was inhabited by 2030 Muslim Albanians.

== Sports ==
The local football club KF Besa Dobërdoll plays in the Macedonian First League.
