= Shefit Shefiti =

Albanian footballer (born 1998)

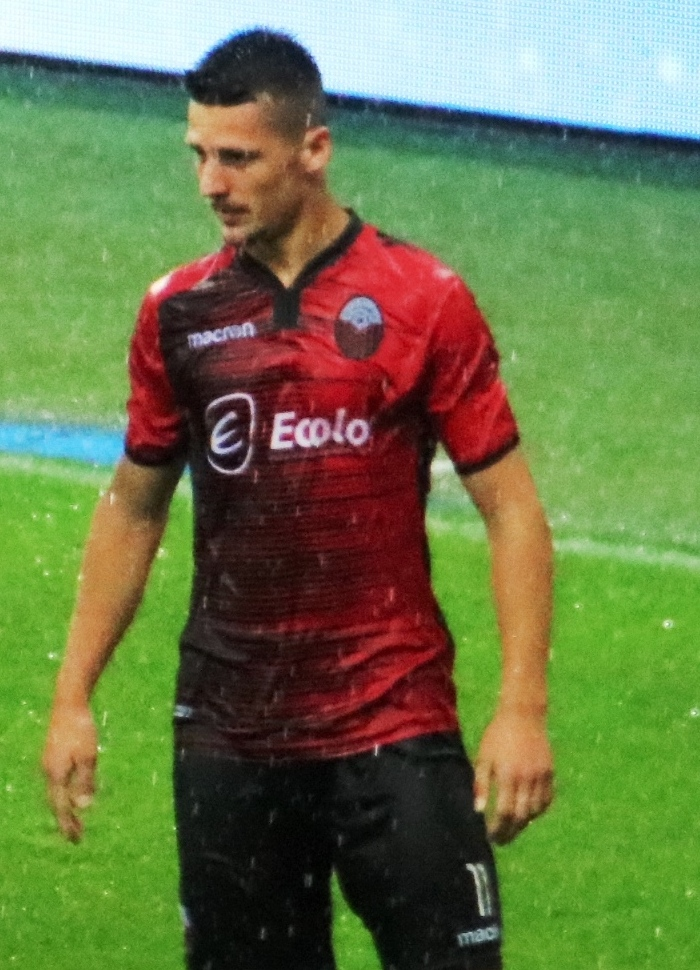
- Shefiti with Shkëndija in 2018

Personal information
- Full name: Shefit Shefiti
- Date of birth: 19 February 1998 (age 28)
- Place of birth: Tetovo, Macedonia
- Height: 1.77 m (5 ft 10 in)
- Position: Midfielder

Team information
- Current team: Hatta
- Number: 99

Youth career
- –2017: Shkëndija

Senior career*
Years	Team	Apps	(Gls)
2016–2020	Shkëndija	51	(8)
2020–2022	Renova	63	(14)
2022–2023	Prishtina	21	(3)
2024–2025	Arsimi	+9	(+8)
2025	Besa Dobërdoll	14	(3)
2025–2026	Arsimi	12	(11)
2026–	Hatta	7	(8)

International career^{‡}
2016	Macedonia U18	2	(0)
2016	Macedonia U19	6	(0)
2018–2019	Albania U21	8	(2)
- * Club domestic league appearances and goals as of 27 September 2025 ‡ National team caps and goals as of 9 June 2019

Shefit Shefiti (born 19 February 1998) is a professional footballer who plays as a midfielder for Hatta in the UAE First Division League. Born in Macedonia, he represented Macedonia and Albania at youth international level.

== Club career ==
=== Shkëndija ===
Shefiti was promoted to Shkëndija senior in the 2015–16 season, making his debut on 28 February 2016 as a late substitute in the 3–0 win at Bregalnica Štip.

In the 2017–18 season, Shefiti made 19 league appearances as Shkëndija won the championship for the second time in history. He also played in three cup matches as the tournament ended in conquest, meaning that the team has completed the domestic double.

=== Renova ===
In February 2020, Shefiti joined Renova of the Macedonian First Football League.

=== Prishtina ===
On September 2, 2022, he signed for Prishtina of the Kosovo Superleague. His official debut came in an away game against Drita on the 19 November 2022 where he also scored.

== International career ==
=== Macedonia ===
Formerly an Macedonia youth international, Shefiti's career begun with the under-18 side, making his debut on 26 March 2016 as a late replacement for Darko Dodev in a 3–2 loss to Finland. After that, he went on to make several other appearances in friendlies.

Later in May 2016, Shefiti traveled with the under-19 squad under Jetron Nesimi in Cyprus to play in two friendly match versus the home national team. He was used only in the second match, playing as starter in the match which ended in a 1–1 draw.

Shefiti continued to be part of under-19, participating in the qualifying round of 2017 UEFA European Under-19 Championship. He played three matches, one as starter with Macedonia finishing last in Group 11.

=== Albania ===
On 29 May 2018, Shefiti received a call-up from Albania under-21 team manager Alban Bushi for the friendlies versus Belarus. He started the first match on 5 June, and scored from a tap-in in an eventual 3–2 win at Elbasan Arena.

== Honours ==
Shkëndija

- Macedonian First League: 2017–18, 2018–19
- Macedonian Cup: 2015–16, 2017–18

Prishtina

- Kosovar Cup: 2022–23
