= Darko Glishikj =

Macedonian footballer

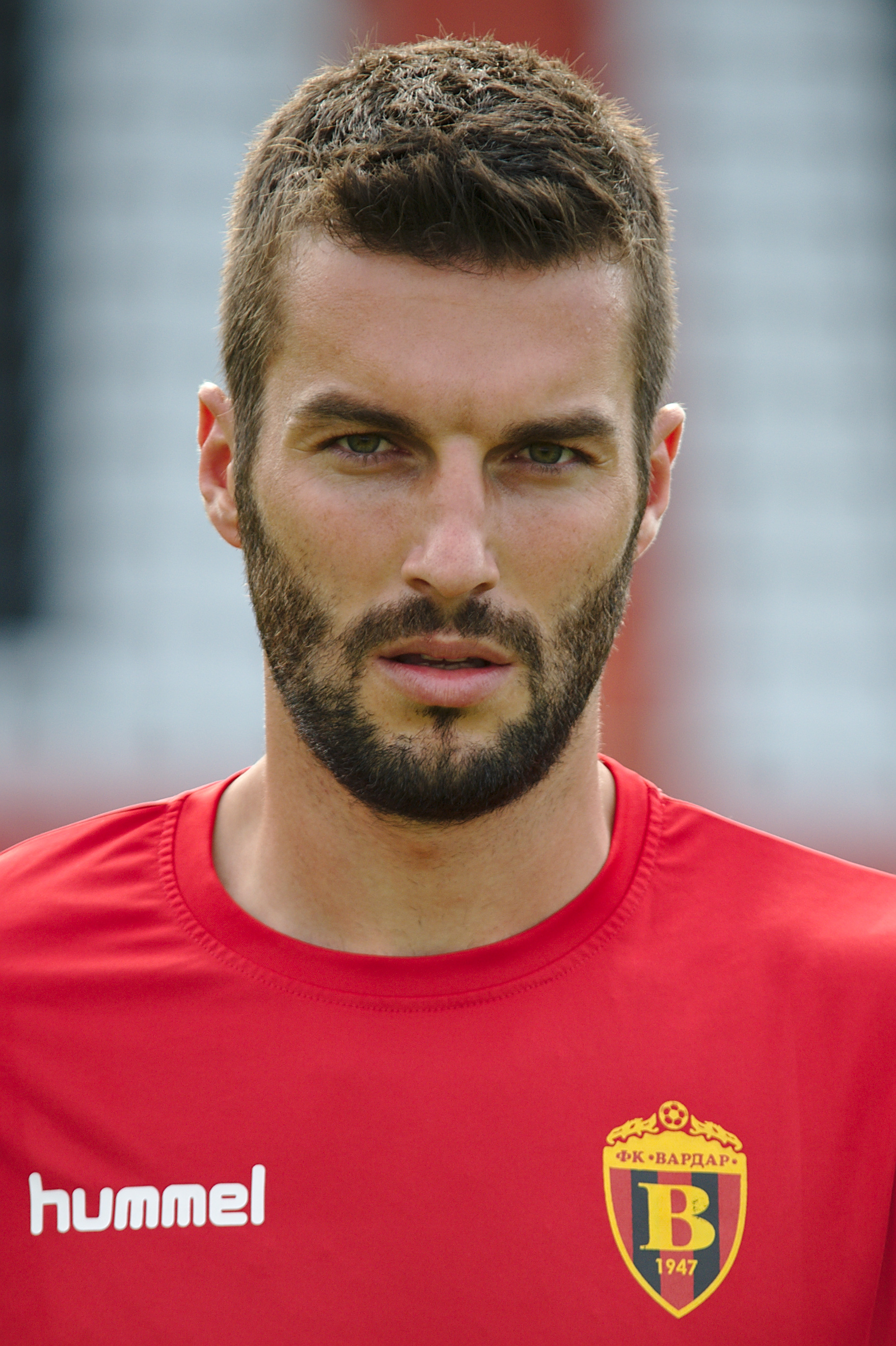

Personal information
- Full name: Darko Glishikj
- Date of birth: 23 September 1991 (age 35)
- Place of birth: Skopje, Macedonia
- Height: 1.80 m (5 ft 11 in)
- Position: Left back

Youth career
- FK Vardar

Senior career*
Years	Team	Apps	(Gls)
2010	Vardar	4	(0)
2010	Olimpic Sarajevo	1	(0)
2011	Skopje	13	(3)
2011	Napredok	18	(3)
2012	Teteks	10	(0)
2012–2014	Dinamo Tbilisi	43	(3)
2014–2018	Vardar	41	(0)
2018–2019	Septemvri Sofia	14	(0)
2019	Arda Kardzhali	12	(0)
2020	Shkupi	19	(0)
2021	Doxa Katokopias	13	(0)
2021-2024	Vardar	84	(7)
2024-2025	Gostivar	15	(1)

International career
2010–2011	Macedonia U-19	4	(0)
2010–2012	Macedonia U-21	5	(0)
2013	Macedonia	2	(0)
- * Club domestic league appearances and goals as of 1 June 2025

Darko Glishikj (Macedonian: Дарко Глишиќ; Serbian: Дарко Глишић, romanized: Darko Glišić; born 23 September 1991) is a Macedonian footballer who currently plays as a left back.

== International career ==
After finishing his first season in Georgia with double (winning both Championship and Cup) Glishikj was called up for the senior team for the first time. He made his debut in a June 2013 friendly match away against Sweden and has earned a total of 2 caps, scoring no goals. His second and final international was another June 2013 friendly against Norway.

== Honours ==
=== Club ===
Dinamo Tbilisi

- Georgian Premier League: 2012–13, 2013–14
- Georgian Cup: 2012–13, 2013–14

Vardar

- Macedonian First League: 2014–15, 2015–16, 2016–17
