= Fernando Augusto (footballer) =

Brazilian footballer (born 1993)

Personal information
- Full name: Fernando Augusto Rodrigues de Araujo
- Date of birth: 25 July 1993 (age 33)
- Place of birth: Araxá, Brazil
- Position: Defender

Team information
- Current team: Sliema Wanderers

Senior career*
Years	Team	Apps	(Gls)
–2012	Corinthians	0	(0)
2012–2013	Flamengo de Guarulhos	16	(2)
2015	Caldense	2	(0)
2016	Juazeirense	1	(0)
2016	URT	2	(0)
2016–2017	Pelister	28	(1)
2017–2018	Caldense	2	(0)
2018	Araxá		
2018–2019	Rio Preto	14	(1)
2019	Moto Club	5	(0)
2019–2022	Makedonija	70	(7)
2022	FK Partizani	1	(0)
2022	Uberaba	0	(0)
2022–2023	KF Llapi	26	(2)
2024	Paranoá Esporte Clube		
2024	Inhumas EC		
2024–2025	Floriana	15	(0)
2025	Sobradinho Esporte Clube	0	(0)
2025	Inhumas EC	7	(1)
2025	EC Mamoré		
2025–	Sliema Wanderers	6	(2)
- * Club domestic league appearances and goals as of 6 October 2025

Fernando Augusto Rodrigues de Araujo (born 25 July 1993), known as Fernando Augusto or Fernandinho, is a Brazilian professional footballer who plays as a defender for Sliema Wanderers on Malta.

== Career ==
Augusto started his senior career with Corinthians. In 2018, he signed for Caldense in the Brazilian Campeonato Mineiro, where he made two league appearances and scored no goals. After that, he played for Araxá, Rio Preto, Moto Club, and Makedonija, where he plays as of 2019.
