= Mathias Kaarsbo =

Danish footballer (born 2006)

Personal information
- Full name: Mathias Kaarsbo Winther
- Date of birth: 13 February 2006 (age 20)
- Place of birth: New York, United States
- Position: Midfielder

Team information
- Current team: Hødd (on loan from Lyngby)
- Number: 16

Youth career
- FFB Frederikssund
- Frederikssund IK
- 2017–2019: Stoke City
- 2019–202?: Nordsjælland
- 202?–2025: Lyngby

Senior career*
Years	Team	Apps	(Gls)
2025–	Lyngby	17	(1)
2026–	→ Hødd (loan)	10	(0)

International career
2021–2022	Denmark U-16	5	(1)
2025–	Denmark U-19	3	(0)
- * Club domestic league appearances and goals as of 14 November 2026

Mathias Kaarsbo Winther (born 13 February 2006) is a Danish footballer who plays as a midfielder for Norwegian club Hødd, on loan from Danish Superliga club Lyngby Boldklub.

== Club career ==
Kaarsbo was born in New York, USA, where his family had lived for a while because his father had gotten a job in the country. When Kaarsbo was one and a half years old, the family moved to Frederikssund. Here he started playing football, where he played for both FFB Frederikssund and later Frederikssund IK.

In 2017, Kaarsbo moved again with his family, this time to Manchester, as his mother had gotten a job there. Kaarsbo had trials at both Manchester United and Manchester City, but ended up starting at the academy in Stoke City.

After two years in England, the family moved back to Denmark, and Kaarsbo's father got a job at FC Nordsjælland, just as Kaarsbo himself also started at the club's academy. Later, he transferred to Lyngby Boldklub, where he became part of the club's academy. On May 9, 2025, 19-year old Kaarsbo signed a new contract with Lyngby until June 2028.

On May 24, 2025, at the age of 19, Kaarsbo made his professional debut for Lyngby in a 3–1 victory on the final matchday of the Danish Superliga against AaB.

On 2 September 2026, Kaarsbo was loaned out to Norwegian First Division club IL Hødd for the rest of 2026.

== Honours ==
Lyngby

- Danish 1st Division: 2025–26
