= FK Detonit Junior =

- Full name: Fudbalski Klub Detonit Junior
- Founded: 2014
- Dissolved: 2022
- Ground: Gradski Stadion Radoviš
- Capacity: 2,000
Home colours	Away colours

FK Detonit Junior (Macedonian: ФК Детонит Јуниор) was a football club based in the city of Radoviš, Republic of North Macedonia. They were recently competed in the Macedonian Second League.

== History ==
The club was founded in 2014. In 2022, the club was merged with FK Plačkovica and youth team Azzurri and after that the club ceased operations.
