= Velešta =

Velešta Велешта Veleshtë
- Village
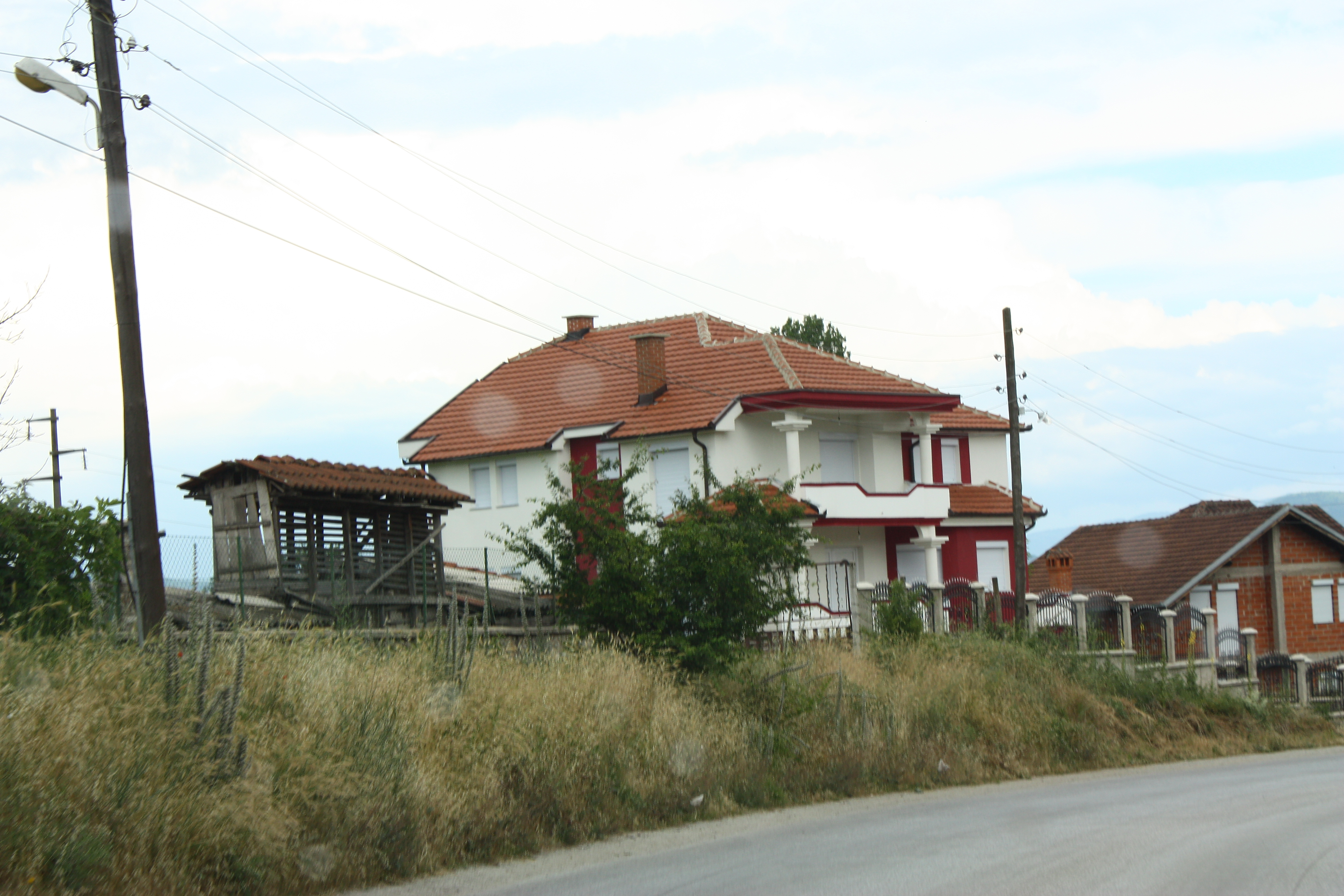
- Velešta

- Location within North Macedonia
- Coordinates: 41°14′26″N 20°38′38″E
- Country: North Macedonia
- Region: Southwestern
- Municipality: Struga
- Elevation: 691 m (2,267 ft)

Population (2021)
  - Total: 3,378
- Time zone: UTC+1 (CET)
  - Summer (DST): UTC+2 (CEST)
- Area code: +38946
- Car plates: SU
- Website: .

Velešta (Macedonian: Велешта, Albanian: Veleshtë) is a village in the municipality of Struga, North Macedonia.

== Geography ==
The village is located in the Drimkol area, in the central part of the territory of the Municipality of Struga, on the left side of the river Black Drin. The village is flat, at an altitude of 716 meters, but there are some houses which are located higher. Part of the village is located on the regional road Struga-Debar, and from the city of Struga itself is 8 km away.

The village is located in the northwestern parts of Struga Field, at the foot of Mount Jablanica.

== History ==
Local traditions among Velešta residents hold that the earliest people to settle in the village originated from Debar with the Istrefaj (Istrefllarë) and Vinca (Vojncallarë) families being the first to do so.

In 1900, Vasil Kanchov gathered and compiled statistics on demographics in the area and reported that the village of Veleshta (Велеща) was inhabited by about 1100 Albanian Muslims.

== Economy ==
The village covers an area of 9.3 km². It is dominated by arable land on an area of 829.3 hectares, pastures account for 19 hectares, and forests only 1.7 hectares.

The village basically has an agricultural function.

It also has an unfortunate reputation as a sex trafficking hub. The authorities have carried out numerous anti-trafficking raids in the village over the past two decades.

== Demographics ==
The Gheg dialect of the Albanian language is spoken in Velešta.

As of the 2021 census, Velešta had 3,378 residents with the following ethnic composition:

- Albanians 3,254
- Persons for whom data are taken from administrative sources 115
- Macedonians 7
- Others 2

According to the 2002 census, the village had a total of 5834 inhabitants. Ethnic groups in the village include:

- Albanians 5758
- Macedonians 1
- Romani 1
- Others 74

== Sports ==
Local football club KF Veleshta plays in the Macedonian Third League (Southwest Division).
