= KF Besa Dobërdoll =

Association football club in North Macedonia

- Full name: Klubi Futbollistik Besa Dobërdoll
- Nickname: The Black And Blues (црната и сината боја)
- Founded: 1976; 50 years ago
- Ground: City Stadium Gostivar, Gostivar
- Capacity: 1,000
- Chairman: Bujar Kadriji
- Final season 2024–25: Macedonian First League, 10th (relegated)

KF Besa Dobërdoll is a football club based in the village of Dobri Dol, Gostivar, North Macedonia. They did competing in the Macedonian Second League and Macedonian First League.

== History ==
They won the Macedonian Second League in 2024 promoting to the first tier for the first time in their history.

In 2025, Besa Dobërdoll withdrew from all leagues but announced they will not dissolve. They continue to work as a football academy.

== Honours ==
(North Macedonia) Macedonian Second League:

- Winners (1): 2023–24

== Players ==
=== Current squad ===
As of 25 June 2025

Note: Flags indicate national team as defined under FIFA eligibility rules; some limited exceptions apply. Players may hold more than one non-FIFA nationality.

| No. | Pos. | Nation | Player |
|---|---|---|---|
| 1 | GK | MKD | Dejan Siljanovski |
| 3 | DF | ALB | Almir Rexhepi |
| 7 | FW | ALB | Shefit Shefiti |
| 9 | FW | MKD | Vlatko Stojanovski |
| 10 | FW | MKD | Xhemail Esati |
| 11 | FW | MKD | Admir Ljatifi |
| 12 | DF | MKD | Fatlum Selmani |
| 13 | MF | MKD | Egzon Tairi |

| No. | Pos. | Nation | Player |
|---|---|---|---|
| 34 | MF | MKD | Ersan Mustafa |
| 35 | GK | MKD | Kostadin Zahov |
| 77 | MF | SRB | Jasin Nuredini |
| 88 | FW | MKD | Hisar Ali |
| 90 | DF | SRB | Nikola Gavrić |
| 99 | FW | MKD | Zani Nazifi |
| — | GK | MKD | Aleksandar Angjelkovski |
| — | GK | MKD | Resul Ramadani |

=== Out on loan ===
Note: Flags indicate national team as defined under FIFA eligibility rules; some limited exceptions apply. Players may hold more than one non-FIFA nationality.

| No. | Pos. | Nation | Player |
