= Sefer Emini =

Macedonian footballer (born 2000)

Personal information
- Date of birth: 15 July 2000 (age 26)
- Height: 1.79 m (5 ft 10 in)
- Position: Midfielder

Team information
- Current team: Sønderjyske
- Number: 7

Youth career
- –2019: Makedonija Gj. P.

Senior career*
Years	Team	Apps	(Gls)
2019–2020	Makedonija Gj. P.	32	(5)
2020–2022	Akron	14	(0)
2021–2022	→ Makedonija Gj. P. (loan)	26	(8)
2022	Makedonija Gj. P.	2	(2)
2022–	Sønderjyske	100	(12)

International career^{‡}
2019	North Macedonia U20	1	(1)
2020–2022	North Macedonia U21	4	(1)
2026–	North Macedonia	1	(0)
- * Club domestic league appearances and goals as of 19 May 2026 ‡ National team caps and goals as of 5 June 2022

Sefer Emini (Macedonian: Сефер Емини; born 15 July 2000) is a Macedonian professional footballer who plays for Danish club Sønderjyske and the North Macedonia national team.

== Club career ==
=== Makedonija Gj. P. and Akron ===
First professional league debut was on 26 May 2019 against FK Pobeda, come from the bench on the 53 minute. FC Akron sign Sefer Emini for 80.000 euro from FK Makedonija GP on 16 October 2020. He made his debut in the Russian Football National League for FC Akron Tolyatti on 7 November 2020 in a game against PFC Krylia Sovetov Samara.

== International career ==
Emini was called up to the North Macedonia national team for a set of friendlies in June 2026.
