= 2016–17 F.C. Copenhagen season =

F.C. Copenhagen
2016–17 season
- Chairman: Bo Rygaard
- Manager: Ståle Solbakken
- Danish Superliga: 1st
- Danish Cup: Winners
- UEFA Champions League: Group stage
- UEFA Europa League: Round of 16
- Top goalscorer: League: Andreas Cornelius; Federico Santander (12 each); All: Andreas Cornelius (21 goals)
- Highest home attendance: 34,146 (vs Leicester City, 2 November 2016)
- Lowest home attendance: 6,924 (vs Crusaders, 19 July 2016)
- Average home league attendance: 17,554
Home colours	Away colours	Third colours

This article shows statistics of individual players for the football club F.C. Copenhagen. It also lists all matches that F.C. Copenhagen played in the 2016–17 season.

== Players ==
=== Squad information ===
This section show the squad as currently, considering all players who are confirmedly moved in and out (see section Players in / out).

N	Pos.	Nat.	Name	Age	EU	Since	App	Goals	Ends	Transfer fee	Notes
1	GK	(Denmark)	Andersen	44	EU	2014	77	0	2018	Free	
2	RB	(Norway)	Høgli	42	EU	2014	71	1	2017	Free	
3	LB	(Sweden)	Augustinsson	32	EU	2015 (Winter)	108	5	2019	DKK 11 m	
4	CB	(Sweden)	Nilsson	43	EU	2014	35	2	2017	Free	
5	CB	(Sweden)	Johansson	37	EU	2016 (Winter)	62	1	2020	Undisclosed	
6	CM	(Denmark)	Kvist	41	EU	2015	360	15	2020	Free	
7	LW	(Slovenia)	Verbič	32	EU	2015	72	11	2019	DKK 6m	
8	CM	(Denmark)	Delaney	34	EU	2009	246	24	2017	Youth system	
8	CM	(Serbia)	Matić	36	Non-EU	2017	21	2	2021	Undisclosed	
9	ST	(Denmark)	Kadrii	35	EU	2014	41	4	2018	Undisclosed	
11	ST	(Denmark)	Cornelius	33	EU	2014	176	61	2018	DKK 27m	
14	LM	(Denmark)	Thomsen	33	EU	2017	0	0	2021	Undisclosed	
15	CB	(Sweden)	Antonsson	45	EU	2014	193	3	2018	Free	
16	CM	(Slovakia)	Greguš	35	EU	2016	42	4	2020	DKK 8m	
17	RM	(Denmark)	Kusk	34	EU	2015	74	17	2020	Undisclosed	
19	CF	(Paraguay)	Santander	35	Non-EU	2015	80	34	2020	DKK 23m	
20	RB	(Denmark)	Remmer	33	EU	2012	67	0	2017	Youth system	
20	LB	(Denmark)	Boilesen	34	EU	2016	13	0	2020	Free	
22	RB	(Denmark)	Ankersen	35	EU	2015	86	5	2020	Undisclosed	
23	CF	(Serbia)	Pavlović	32	Non-EU	2016	50	11	2021	Undisclosed	
24	AM	(Morocco) (Denmark)	Toutouh	33	EU	2011	156	18	2018	Free	
25	CB	(Denmark)	Zanka	36	EU	2014	275	18	2018	DKK 4 m	
26	CB	(Denmark)	Okore	33	EU	2016	8	0	2020	Free	
31	GK	(Sweden) (Denmark)	Olsen	36	EU	2016 (Winter)	63	0	2020	Undisclosed	
32	SS	(Denmark)	Amankwaa	32	EU	2013	87	4	2018	Youth system	
33	RW	(Denmark)	Falk	34	EU	2016	38	9	2020	Free	
34	CB	(Denmark)	Mathisen	30	EU	2015	4	0	2017	Youth system	
34	CB	(Denmark)	Bay	28	EU	2016	1	0	2017	Youth system	
35	CM	(Ivory Coast)	Keita	28	EU	2016	10	1	2020	Youth system	
37	ST	(Norway)	Kristoffersen	29	EU	2016	4	2	?	Youth system	
41	GK	(Denmark)	Christensen	47	EU	2010	30	0	2017	Undisclosed	

- Last updated: 28 May
- Source: F.C. Copenhagen, players' Wikipedia articles, fck_kontrakter (for contract endings)
- Ordered by squad number.

=== Squad stats ===
				Total			Danish Superliga		UEFA Champions League		Danish Cup		UEFA Europa League	
No.	Pos.	Nat.	Name	Sts	App	Gls	App	Gls	App	Gls	App	Gls	App	Gls
31	GK	(Sweden) (Denmark)	Olsen	49	49		33		11		1		4	
22	RB	(Norway)	Ankersen	49	49	5	32	5	11		2		4	
25	CB	(Denmark)	Zanka	51	51	2	33		12	2	3		3	
5	CB	(Sweden)	Johansson	46	46	1	28	1	11		3		4	
3	LB	(Sweden)	Augustinsson	49	50	2	32	1	12		2	1	4	
7	LW	(Slovenia)	Verbič	30	40	6	27	6	9		3		1	
6	CM	(Denmark)	Kvist	45	47		30		11		3		3	
8	CM	(Denmark)	Delaney	29	30	8	19	6	11	2				
24	AM	(Morocco) (Denmark)	Toutouh	38	53	6	32	5	12		5		4	1
11	ST	(Denmark)	Cornelius	38	49	21	30	12	11	6	4	2	4	1
19	CF	(Paraguay)	Santander	40	44	17	28	12	9	4	3	1	4	
23	CF	(Serbia)	Pavlović	32	50	11	35	8	8	2	4	1	3	
16	CM	(Denmark)	Greguš	19	42	4	28	2	8	1	4	1	2	
17	RM	(Denmark)	Kusk	20	41	9	30	6	5		4	3	2	
33	RW	(Denmark)	Falk	29	38	9	22	5	12	2	1	1	3	1
8	CM	(Serbia)	Matić	17	21	1	15	1			2		4	
2	RB	(Norway)	Høgli	6	14		9		1		3		1	
20	LB	(Denmark)	Boilesen	8	13		8				3		2	
15	CB	(Sweden)	Antonsson	9	12		8		2		2			
32	SS	(Denmark)	Amankwaa		12		8		3		1			
1	GK	(Denmark)	Andersen	8	8		3		1		4			
26	CB	(Denmark)	Okore	6	8		5				2		1	
35	CM	(Ivory Coast)	Keita	3	7	1	2		2		2	1	1	
27	RB	(Denmark)	Roerslev	2	5	1	3				2	1		
9	ST	(Denmark)	Kadrii		3		1		2					
39	ST	(Denmark)	Røjkjær		2	2					2	2		
37	ST	(Norway)	Kristoffersen	1	2	2					2	2		
20	RB	(Denmark)	Remmer	1	1				1					
34	CB	(Denmark)	Bay	1	1						1			
40	ST	(Denmark)	Holse		1						1			
4	CB	(Sweden)	Nilsson											
14	LM	(Denmark)	Thomsen											
34	CB	(Denmark)	Mathisen											
41	GK	(Denmark)	Christensen											

Last updated: 29 May
Source: FCK.dk
Ordered by Starting 11 then appearances
0 shown as blank

=== Players in / out ===
==== In ====
No.	Pos.	Nat.	Name	Age	EU	Moving from	Type	Transfer window	Ends	Transfer fee	Source
22	RB	(Denmark)	Ankersen	25	EU	Red Bull Salzburg (Austria)	Transfer	Summer	2020	n/a	FCK.dk
31	GK	(Sweden) (Denmark)	Olsen	26	EU	PAOK (Greece)	Transfer	Winter	2020	n/a	FCK.dk
	CF	(Belgium)	De Ridder	29	EU	Zulte Waregem (Belgium)	End of loan	Summer	2018	n/a	
23	CF	(Germany)	Pourié	25	EU	Ufa (Russia)	End of loan	Summer	2017	n/a	
36	CM	(Faroe Islands)	Hendriksson	20	EU	Vendsyssel FF	End of loan	Summer	2017	n/a	
33	RW	(Denmark)	Falk	24	EU	OB	Transfer	Summer	2020	Free	FCK.dk
23	CF	(Serbia)	Pavlović	22	Non-EU	Čukarički (Serbia)	Transfer	Summer	2021	Undisclosed	FCK.dk
16	CM	(Slovakia)	Greguš	25	EU	Jablonec (Czech Republic)	Transfer	Summer	2020	DKK 8,000,000	FCK.dk
34	CB	(Denmark)	Bay	19	EU	Youth system	Promoted	Summer	2017	Youth system	FCK.dk
20	LB	(Denmark)	Boilesen	24	EU	Ajax (Netherlands)	Transfer	Summer	2020	Free	FCK.dk
26	CB	(Denmark)	Okore	24	EU	Aston Villa (England)	Transfer	Summer	2020	Free	FCK.dk
37	ST	(Norway)	Kristoffersen	19	EU	Youth system	Promoted	Summer	?	Youth system	FCK.dk
8	CM	(Serbia)	Matić	26	Non-EU	Sturm Graz (Austria)	Transfer	Winter	2021	Undisclosed	FCK.dk
14	LM	(Denmark)	Thomsen	23	EU	Nantes (France)	Transfer	Winter	2021	Undisclosed	FCK.dk

==== Out ====
No.	Pos.	Nat.	Name	Age	EU	Moving to	Type	Transfer window	Transfer fee	Source
13	CB	(Denmark)	Stadsgaard	30	EU		Contract ended	Summer	Free	
28	GK	(Belgium)	Kaminski	23	EU	Anderlecht (Belgium)	End of loan	Summer	n/a	
10	SS	(Denmark)	Jørgensen	25	EU	Feyenoord (Netherlands)	Transfer	Summer	Undisclosed	Feyenoord.nl
23	CF	(Germany)	Pourié	25	EU	Randers FC	Mutual agreement	Summer	Free	RandersFC.dk
36	CM	(Faroe Islands)	Hendriksson	20	EU	Randers FC	Transfer	Summer	Undisclosed	RandersFC.dk
34	CB	(Denmark)	Mathisen	20	EU	Halmstads BK (Sweden)	Transfer	Summer	Undisclosed	HBK.se
20	RB	(Denmark)	Remmer	23	EU	Molde (Norway)	Transfer	Summer	Undisclosed	MoldeFK.no
	CF	(Belgium)	De Ridder	29	EU	Lokeren (Belgium)	Mutual agreement	Summer	Free	Sporting.be
4	CB	(Sweden)	Nilsson	34	EU		Retired	Winter	Free	
8	CM	(Denmark)	Delaney	25	EU	Werder Bremen (Germany)	Transfer	Winter	DKK 15,000,000	Werder.de
34	LB	(Denmark)	Bay	19	EU	Helsingør	Loan	Winter	n/a	FCHelsingor.dk
9	ST	(Denmark)	Kadrii	25	EU	Minnesota United (United States)	Loan	Winter	n/a	MNUFC.com
35	CM	(Ivory Coast)	Keita	19	EU	Halmstads BK (Sweden)	Loan	Winter	n/a	

Last updated: 21 March

== Club ==
=== Coaching staff ===
Position	Staff
Head coach	Norway Ståle Solbakken
Assistant coach	Denmark Brian Priske
Goalkeeping coach	Netherlands Anton Scheutjens
Fitness coach	Denmark Anders Storskov

Last updated: 13 July
Source: F.C. Copenhagen

=== Other information ===
Chairman	Denmark Bo Rygaard
Technical director	Denmark Johan Lange
Club secretary	Denmark Daniel Rommedahl
Ground (capacity and dimensions)	Telia Parken (38,065 / 105x68 m)

Updated to match played 13 July
Source: F.C. Copenhagen and Telia Parken

== Competitions ==
=== Overall ===
Competition	Started round	Current position / round	Final position / round	First match	Last match
Danish Superliga	—	—	1st	16 July	28 May
UEFA Champions League	Second qualifying round	—	Group stage	13 July	7 December
Danish Cup	Third round	—	Final	26 October	25 May
UEFA Europa League	Round of 32	—	Round of 16	16 February	16 March 2017

Updated to match played 28 May
Source: Competitions

=== Danish Superliga ===
==== Regular season ====
Pos	Team	Pld	W	D	L	GF	GA	GD	Pts	Qualification
1	Copenhagen	26	19	7	0	57	10	+47	64	Qualification for the championship round
2	Brøndby	26	15	7	4	52	23	+29	52	Qualification for the championship round
3	Lyngby	26	11	6	9	25	23	+2	39	Qualification for the championship round
4	SønderjyskE	26	10	9	7	30	32	−2	39	Qualification for the championship round
5	Midtjylland	26	10	8	8	44	29	+15	38	Qualification for the championship round

Source: DBU, Soccerway
Rules for classification: 1) Points; 2) Goal difference; 3) Goals scored; 4) Away goals scored; 5) Play-off (played on neutral ground if determining teams for different rounds); 6) Draw.

==== Championship round ====
Pos	Team	Pld	W	D	L	GF	GA	GD	Pts	Qualification
1	Copenhagen (C)	36	25	9	2	74	20	+54	84	Qualification for the Champions League second qualifying round
2	Brøndby	36	18	8	10	62	40	+22	62	Qualification for the Europa League second qualifying round
3	Lyngby	36	17	7	12	42	35	+7	58	Qualification for the Europa League first qualifying round
4	Midtjylland (O)	36	15	9	12	67	53	+14	54	Qualification for the European play-off final
5	Nordsjælland	36	13	10	13	59	55	+4	49	
6	SønderjyskE	36	12	10	14	44	54	−10	46	

Source: Soccerway
Rules for classification: 1) Points; 2) Goal difference; 3) Goals scored; 4) Away goals scored; 5) Play-off (played on neutral ground if determining champion or UEFA competitions); 6) Draw.
(C) Champions; (O) Play-off winners

==== Results summary ====
Overall								Home						Away					
Pld	W	D	L	GF	GA	GD	Pts	W	D	L	GF	GA	GD	W	D	L	GF	GA	GD
36	25	9	2	74	20	+54	84	15	3	0	43	4	+39	10	6	2	31	16	+15

Last updated: 28 May.

==== Results by round ====
Round	1	2	3	4	5	6	7	8	9	10	11	12	13	14	15	16	17	18	19	20	21	22	23	24	25	26	27	28	29	30	31	32	33	34	35	36
Ground	H	A	H	A	H	H	A	H	A	A	H	A	H	A	A	H	A	A	H	H	A	H	A	H	H	A	A	H	A	H	H	A	H	A	A	H
Result	W	W	W	D	W	D	D	W	W	D	W	D	W	W	W	W	W	W	W	W	W	D	D	W	W	W	W	D	W	W	W	D	W	L	L	W

Updated to match(es) played on 28 May. Source: Competitive Matches
A = Away; H = Home; W = Win; D = Draw; L = Loss

=== UEFA Champions League ===
==== Second qualifying round ====
Team 1	Agg.	Team 2	1st leg	2nd leg
Crusaders (Northern Ireland)	0–9	(Denmark) Copenhagen	0–3	0–6

Last updated: 19 July.
Source: UEFA Champions League

==== Third qualifying round ====
Team 1	Agg.	Team 2	1st leg	2nd leg
Astra Giurgiu (Romania)	1–4	(Denmark) Copenhagen	1–1	0–3

Last updated: 3 August.
Source: UEFA Champions League

==== Play-off round ====
Team 1	Agg.	Team 2	1st leg	2nd leg
Copenhagen (Denmark)	2–1	(Cyprus) APOEL	1–0	1–1

Last updated: 24 August.
Source: UEFA Champions League

==== Group stage ====
Pos	Team	Pld	W	D	L	GF	GA	GD	Pts	Qualification	LEI	POR	CPH	BRU
1	(England) Leicester City	6	4	1	1	7	6	+1	13	Advance to knockout phase	—	1–0	1–0	2–1
2	(Portugal) Porto	6	3	2	1	9	3	+6	11	Advance to knockout phase	5–0	—	1–1	1–0
3	(Denmark) Copenhagen	6	2	3	1	7	2	+5	9	Transfer to Europa League	0–0	0–0	—	4–0
4	(Belgium) Club Brugge	6	0	0	6	2	14	−12	0		0–3	1–2	0–2	—

Source: UEFA
Rules for classification: Group stage tiebreakers

==== Results summary ====
Overall								Home						Away					
Pld	W	D	L	GF	GA	GD	Pts	W	D	L	GF	GA	GD	W	D	L	GF	GA	GD
12	6	5	1	22	4	+18	23	4	2	0	14	0	+14	2	3	1	8	4	+4

Last updated: 7 December.

=== UEFA Europa League ===
==== Round of 32 ====
Team 1	Agg.	Team 2	1st leg	2nd leg
Ludogorets (Bulgaria)	1–2	(Denmark) Copenhagen	1–2	0–0

Last updated: 23 February.
Source: UEFA Europa League

==== Round of 16 ====
Team 1	Agg.	Team 2	1st leg	2nd leg
Copenhagen (Denmark)	2–3	(Netherlands) Ajax	2–1	0–2

Last updated: 16 March.
Source: UEFA Europa League

==== Results summary ====
Overall								Home						Away					
Pld	W	D	L	GF	GA	GD	Pts	W	D	L	GF	GA	GD	W	D	L	GF	GA	GD
4	2	1	1	4	4	0	7	1	1	0	2	1	+1	1	0	1	2	3	−1

Last updated: 16 March.

== Matches ==
=== Competitive ===
Game	Date	Tournament	Round	Ground	Opponent	Score^{1}	TV	Report
1	13 July	UEFA Champions League	Second qualifying round	A (Northern Ireland)	Crusaders (Northern Ireland)	3–0	TV3+	Report / Report link; Kick off / 19:00 BST; Referee / Stephan Klossner; Copenhagen / Crusaders; Santander 6'; Cornelius (yellow card) 23'; Cornelius 40'; Falk 53' / Caddell (yellow card) 35'
2	16 July	Danish Superliga	1	H	Lyngby Boldklub	3–0	Canal 9	Report / Report link; Kick off / 18:30 CEST; Attendance / 9,953; Referee / Michael Tykgaard; Copenhagen / Lyngby Boldklub; Verbič (yellow card) 15'; Toutouh 33'; Verbič 52'; Delaney 55'; Delaney (yellow card) 64' / Ørnskov (yellow card) 39'; Fosgaard (yellow card) 84'
3	19 July	UEFA Champions League	Second qualifying round	H	Crusaders (Northern Ireland)	6–0	TV3+	Report / Report link; Kick off / 19:15 CEST; Attendance / 6,924; Referee / Ante Vučemilović; Copenhagen / Crusaders; Pavlović 14'; Mitchell 45' (o.g.); Cornelius 48'; Cornelius (yellow card) 56'; Falk 58'; Greguš 68'; Cornelius 76' / Caddell (yellow card) 72'
4	23 July	Danish Superliga	2	A	Esbjerg fB	4–0	TV3+	Report / Report link; Kick off / 17:00 CEST; Attendance / 5,436; Referee / Mads-Kristoffer Kristoffersen; Copenhagen / Esbjerg fB; Verbič 15'; Falk 54'; Delaney 61'; Kusk 71' / Laursen (yellow card) 87'; Nielsen (yellow card) 90'
5	27 July	UEFA Champions League	Third qualifying round	A (Romania)	Astra Giurgiu (Romania)	1–1	TV3+	Report / Report link; Kick off / 20:30 EEST; Referee / István Vad; Copenhagen / Astra Giurgiu; Verbič (yellow card) 21'; Kvist (yellow card) 37'; Delaney 65' / Teixeira 7'; Seto (yellow card) 38'; Vangjeli (yellow card) 78'; Lovin (yellow card) 86'
6	30 July	Danish Superliga	3	H	Nordsjælland	4–0	TV3 Sport 1	Report / Report link; Kick off / 16:00 CEST; Attendance / 9,823; Referee / Jakob Kehlet; Copenhagen / Nordsjælland; Delaney (yellow card) 12'; Pavlović 21'; Falk 39'; Kusk 63'; Kusk 69' / Ingvartsen (yellow card) 56'
7	3 August	UEFA Champions League	Third qualifying round	H	Astra Giurgiu (Romania)	3–0	TV3+	Report / Report link; Kick off / 19:45 CEST; Attendance / 16,853; Referee / Liran Liany; Copenhagen / Astra Giurgiu; Cornelius 14'; Santander 34'; Cornelius 45' / Stan (yellow card) 56'
8	7 August	Danish Superliga	4	A	SønderjyskE	1–1	Canal 9	Report / Report link; Kick off / 16:00 CEST; Attendance / 6,054; Referee / Michael Tykgaard; Copenhagen / SønderjyskE; Verbič 23'; Delaney (yellow card) 31'; Kusk (yellow card) 47'; Johansson (yellow card) 67' / Guira (yellow card) 14'; Kroon 63'
9	13 August	Danish Superliga	5	H	Midtjylland	3–1	Canal 9	Report / Report link; Kick off / 18:30 CEST; Attendance / 12,074; Referee / Mads-Kristoffer Kristoffersen; Copenhagen / Midtjylland; Kvist (yellow card) 45'; Johansson 65'; Dahlin 72' (o.g.); Toutouh 88' / Poulsen 24'; Banggaard (yellow card) 43'
10	16 August	UEFA Champions League	Play-off round	H	APOEL (Cyprus)	1–0	TV3+	Report / Report link; Kick off / 20:45 CEST; Attendance / 20,519; Referee / Pavel Královec; Copenhagen / APOEL; Falk (yellow card) 7'; Pavlović 43' / Orlandi (yellow card) 29'; Morais (yellow card) 52'
11	20 August	Danish Superliga	6	H	AaB	1–1	TV3+	Report / Report link; Kick off / 18:30 CEST; Attendance / 11,818; Referee / Anders Poulsen; Copenhagen / AaB; Cornelius 40' / Bassogog 23'; Würtz (yellow card) 67'; Sloth (yellow card) 84'; Grønning (yellow card) 90'
12	24 August	UEFA Champions League	Play-off round	A (Cyprus)	APOEL (Cyprus)	1–1	TV3+	Report / Report link; Kick off / 21:45 EEST; Attendance / 17,310; Referee / Gianluca Rocchi; Copenhagen / APOEL; Kvist (yellow card) 36'; Augustinsson (yellow card) 40'; Delaney (yellow card) 64'; Santander 86' / Orlandi (yellow card) 45'; Sotiriou 69'; Vander (yellow card) 82'
13	28 August	Danish Superliga	7	A	Brøndby	1–1	TV3+	Report / Report link; Kick off / 16:00 CEST; Attendance / 23,518; Referee / Jens Maae; Copenhagen / Brøndby; Pavlović 45'; Johansson (yellow card) 60'; Zanka (yellow card) 75'; Delaney (yellow card) 90' / Hjulsager 68'; Hermannsson (yellow card) 79'; Crone (yellow card) 88'
14	10 September	Danish Superliga	8	H	OB	2–0	Canal 9	Report / Report link; Kick off / 16:00 CEST; Attendance / 14,219; Referee / Jakob Kehlet; Copenhagen / OB; Zanka (yellow card) 81'; Augustinsson 87' (pen.); Cornelius 90' / Edmundsson (yellow card) 73'; Uzochukwu (yellow card) 78'
15	14 September	UEFA Champions League	Group stage	A (Portugal)	Porto (Portugal)	1–1	TV3+	Report / Report link; Kick off / 19:45 WEST; Attendance / 34,325; Referee / Matej Jug; Copenhagen / Porto; Greguš (yellow card) 12'; Cornelius 52'; Greguš (yellow card) 66' (yellow-red card) / Otávio 13'; Marcano (yellow card) 64'
16	18 September	Danish Superliga	9	A	Horsens	2–0	TV3+	Report / Report link; Kick off / 18:00 CEST; Attendance / 6,095; Referee / Peter Kjærsgaard; Copenhagen / Horsens; Cornelius 16'; Delaney 32'; Delaney (yellow card) 75' / Møller (yellow card) 56'; Aabech (yellow card) 86'; Finnbogason (yellow card) 90'
17	21 September	Danish Superliga	10	A	Randers FC	2–2	TV3 Sport 1	Report / Report link; Kick off / 18:00 CEST; Attendance / 5,729; Referee / Jakob Kehlet; Copenhagen / Randers FC; Santander 19'; Santander (yellow card) 21'; Kvist (yellow card) 44'; Santander 78' / Pourié (yellow card) 37'; Pourié 41'; Marxen 57'
18	24 September	Danish Superliga	11	H	AGF	2–0	TV3+	Report / Report link; Kick off / 16:30 CEST; Attendance / 20,205; Referee / Mads-Kristoffer Kristoffersen; Copenhagen / AGF; Zanka (yellow card) 31'; Ankersen (yellow card) 53'; Santander 72'; Kusk 89' / Pedersen (yellow card) 16'; Sverrisson (yellow card) 58'; Petersen (yellow card) 74'
19	27 September	UEFA Champions League	Group stage	H	Club Brugge (Belgium)	4–0	TV3+	Report / Report link; Kick off / 20:45 CEST; Attendance / 25,605; Referee / Craig Thomson; Copenhagen / Club Brugge; Denswil 54' (o.g.); Zanka (yellow card) 56'; Delaney 64'; Santander 69'; Zanka 90' / Vormer (yellow card) 58'; Claudemir (yellow card) 88'
20	2 October	Danish Superliga	12	A	Viborg FF	0–0	Canal 9	Report / Report link; Kick off / 16:00 CEST; Attendance / 4,137; Referee / Jørgen Daugbjerg Burchardt; Copenhagen / Viborg FF; Kvist (yellow card) 26'; Zanka (yellow card) 44'; Delaney (yellow card) 90' / Park (yellow card) 27'
21	15 October	Danish Superliga	13	H	Silkeborg IF	2–0	TV3 Sport 1	Report / Report link; Kick off / 18:30 CEST; Attendance / 13,187; Referee / Peter Rasmussen; Copenhagen / Silkeborg IF; Falk 25'; Cornelius 28'
22	18 October	UEFA Champions League	Group stage	A (England)	Leicester City (England)	0–1	TV3+	Report / Report link; Kick off / 19:45 BST; Attendance / 31,037; Referee / Nicola Rizzoli; Copenhagen / Leicester City; Zanka (yellow card) 88' / Mahrez 40'; Fuchs (yellow card) 79'
23	23 October	Danish Superliga	14	A	OB	3–0	Canal 9	Report / Report link; Kick off / 16:00 CEST; Attendance / 5,825; Referee / Jakob Kehlet; Copenhagen / OB; Cornelius (yellow card) 38'; Verbič 40'; Tingager 47' (o.g.); Delaney 77' / El Makrini (yellow card) 64'
24	26 October	Danish Cup	Third round	AR	Jammerbugt	6–1	TV3+	Report / Report link; Kick off / 17:30 CEST; Attendance / 651; Referee / Jens Maae; Copenhagen / Jammerbugt; Keita 5'; Falk 29'; Roerslev 47'; Kristoffersen 59'; Røjkjær 79'; Røjkjær 82' / Rye (yellow card) 15'; Jensen 69'
25	30 October	Danish Superliga	15	A	Midtjylland	3–1	TV3+	Report / Report link; Kick off / 18:00 CET; Attendance / 10,624; Referee / Anders Poulsen; Copenhagen / Midtjylland; Santander 3'; Santander 28'; Delaney (yellow card) 45'; Kvist (yellow card) 47'; Cornelius 85' / Pušić 90'
26	2 November	UEFA Champions League	Group stage	H	Leicester City (England)	0–0	TV3+	Report / Report link; Kick off / 20:45 CET; Attendance / 34,146; Referee / Felix Brych; Copenhagen / Leicester City; / Drinkwater (yellow card) 22'; Huth (yellow card) 24'; Hernández (yellow card) 42'; Morgan (yellow card) 78'
27	6 November	Danish Superliga	16	H	SønderjyskE	4–0	TV3+	Report / Report link; Kick off / 18:00 CET; Attendance / 10,143; Referee / Mads-Kristoffer Kristoffersen; Copenhagen / SønderjyskE; Cornelius 18'; Toutouh 25'; Delaney 28'; Toutouh (yellow card) 44'; Toutouh 66' / Hedegaard (yellow card) 69'; Rømer (yellow card) 74'
28	18 November	Danish Superliga	17	A	AaB	2–1	TV3+	Report / Report link; Kick off / 20:15 CET; Attendance / 7,284; Referee / Michael Tykgaard; Copenhagen / AaB; Delaney 4'; Falk 42'; Zanka (yellow card) 49'; Johansson (yellow card) 77' / Børsting 45'; Ahlmann (yellow card) 52'
29	22 November	UEFA Champions League	Group stage	H	Porto (Portugal)	0–0	TV3+	Report / Report link; Kick off / 20:45 CET; Attendance / 32,036; Referee / Milorad Mažić; Copenhagen / Porto; Kvist (yellow card) 47'; Augustinsson (yellow card) 80'; Verbič (yellow card) 90' / Silva (yellow card) 59'; Corona (yellow card) 85'; Jota (yellow card) 87'
30	26 November	Danish Superliga	18	A	Lyngby Boldklub	1–0	Canal 9	Report / Report link; Kick off / 18:00 CET; Attendance / 4,649; Referee / Jørgen Daugbjerg Burchardt; Copenhagen / Lyngby Boldklub; Toutouh 11'; Zanka (yellow card) 43'; Johansson (yellow card) 44'; Delaney (yellow card) 74' / Ørnskov (yellow card) 17'; Larsen (yellow card) 31'
31	29 November	Danish Superliga	19	H	Viborg FF	4–0	Canal 9	Report / Report link; Kick off / 20:00 CET; Attendance / 7,368; Referee / Anders Poulsen; Copenhagen / Viborg FF; Greguš 27'; Kusk 38'; Ankersen 72'; Greguš 82'
32	3 December	Danish Superliga	20	H	Randers FC	1–0	TV3 Sport 1	Report / Report link; Kick off / 18:30 CET; Attendance / 12,069; Referee / Jakob Kehlet; Copenhagen / Randers FC; Falk 13' / Poulsen (yellow card) 77'
33	7 December	UEFA Champions League	Group stage	A (Belgium)	Club Brugge (Belgium)	2–0	TV3+	Report / Report link; Kick off / 20:45 CET; Referee / Michael Oliver; Copenhagen / Club Brugge; Mechele 8' (o.g.); Pavlović (yellow card) 10'; Zanka 15'; Kvist (yellow card) 45' / Denswil (yellow card) 83'
34	11 December	Danish Superliga	21	A	AGF	1–0	Canal 9	Report / Report link; Kick off / 16:00 CET; Attendance / 9,114; Referee / Michael Tykgaard; Copenhagen / AGF; Juel 10' (o.g.); Augustinsson (yellow card) 25'; Johansson (yellow card) 34'; Johansson (yellow card) 81' (yellow-red card)
35	16 February	UEFA Europa League	Round of 32	AR (Bulgaria)	Ludogorets Razgrad (Bulgaria)	2–1	Kanal 5	Report / Report link; Kick off / 20:00 EET; Referee / Ivan Bebek; Copenhagen / Ludogorets Razgrad; Abel 2' (o.g.); Toutouh (yellow card) 37'; Toutouh 53'; Greguš (yellow card) 88'; Kvist (yellow card) 90'; Greguš (yellow card) 90' (yellow-red card) / Marcelinho (yellow card) 64'; Keșerü 81'; Dyakov (yellow card) 90'
36	19 February	Danish Superliga	22	H	Brøndby	0–0	TV3+	Report / Report link; Kick off / 13:30 CET; Attendance / 26,686; Referee / Jakob Kehlet; Copenhagen / Brøndby; Cornelius (yellow card) 19'; Santander (yellow card) 39'; Okore (yellow card) 63'; Zanka (yellow card) 89' / Pukki (yellow card) 41'; Röcker (yellow card) 59'; Sikošek (yellow card) 62'; Nørgaard (yellow card) 63'
37	23 February	UEFA Europa League	Round of 32	H	Ludogorets Razgrad (Bulgaria)	0–0	Kanal 5	Report / Report link; Kick off / 21:05 CET; Attendance / 17,064; Referee / Miroslav Zelinka; Copenhagen / Ludogorets Razgrad; Santander (yellow card) 55'; Ankersen (yellow card) 87' / Abel (yellow card) 34'; Keșerü (yellow card) 39'; Dyakov (yellow card) 90'
38	26 February	Danish Superliga	23	A	Nordsjælland	1–1	Canal 9	Report / Report link; Kick off / 16:00 CET; Attendance / 3,716; Referee / Mads-Kristoffer Kristoffersen; Copenhagen / Nordsjælland; Marcondes 55'; Ingvartsen (yellow card) 88'; Bartolec (yellow card) 90' / Ankersen (yellow card) 43'; Santander 57'; Kvist (yellow card) 83'; Cornelius (yellow card) 90'
39	1 March	Danish Cup	Fourth round	AR	B.93	3–0	TV3+	Report / Report link; Kick off / 19:30 CET; Attendance / 3,984; Referee / Anders Poulsen; Copenhagen / B.93; Kristoffersen 23'; Kusk 27'; Kusk 49' / Holm (yellow card) 35'
40	5 March	Danish Superliga	24	H	Horsens	5–0	Canal 9	Report / Report link; Kick off / 16:00 CET; Attendance / 11,148; Referee / Michael Johansen; Copenhagen / Horsens; Santander 14'; Ankersen 22'; Cornelius 38'; Johansson (yellow card) 53'; Santander 69'; Pavlović 80' / Hansson (yellow card) 2'; Helgason (yellow card) 59'
41	9 March	UEFA Europa League	Round of 16	H	Ajax (Netherlands)	2–1	Kanal 5	Report / Report link; Kick off / 19:00 CET; Attendance / 31,189; Referee / Artur Dias; Copenhagen / Ajax; Falk 1'; Zanka (yellow card) 21'; Cornelius 59' / Dolberg (yellow card) 32'; Viergever (yellow card) 65'; Tete (yellow card) 71'; Schøne (yellow card) 77'; Klaassen (yellow card) 88'
42	12 March	Danish Superliga	25	H	Esbjerg fB	2–0	TV3+	Report / Report link; Kick off / 18:00 CET; Attendance / 11,505; Referee / Peter Kjærsgaard; Copenhagen / Esbjerg fB; Santander 54'; Cornelius 59'; Cornelius (yellow card) 62'; Toutouh (yellow card) 62' / Lungi (yellow card) 5'; Tsimikas (yellow card) 58'
43	16 March	UEFA Europa League	Round of 16	A (Netherlands)	Ajax (Netherlands)	0–2	Kanal 5	Report / Report link; Kick off / 21:05 CET; Referee / Ivan Kružliak; Copenhagen / Ajax; Greguš (yellow card) 19'; Matić (yellow card) 31'; Verbič (yellow card) 65'; Johansson (yellow card) 80'; Santander (yellow card) 87' / Traoré 23'; Sánchez (yellow card) 34'; Dolberg 45' (pen.); Younes (yellow card) 48'; Schøne (yellow card) 78'; Onana (yellow card) 90'
44	19 March	Danish Superliga	26	A	Silkeborg IF	3–1		Report / Report link; Kick off / 17:00 CET; Attendance / 2,995; Referee / Michael Tykgaard; Copenhagen / Silkeborg IF; Santander 68'; Cornelius 81'; Matić 84' / Dahl (yellow card) 35'; Flinta (yellow card) 40'; Moro (yellow card) 43'; Moro 60'
45	3 April	Danish Superliga	27	A	SønderjyskE	2–1	TV3 Sport 1	Report / Report link; Kick off / 19:00 CEST; Attendance / 6,348; Referee / Dennis Mogensen; Copenhagen / SønderjyskE; Augustinsson (yellow card) 13'; Johansson (yellow card) 21'; Matić (yellow card) 31'; Santander (yellow card) 41'; Pavlović 65'; Santander 70'; Zanka (yellow card) 77' / Luijckx (yellow card) 6'; Pedersen (yellow card) 39'; Kløve (yellow card) 45'; Poulsen (yellow card) 64'
46	6 April	Danish Cup	Fifth round	H	AGF	2–1	TV3+	Report / Report link; Kick off / 19:30 CEST; Attendance / 7,755; Referee / Anders Poulsen; Copenhagen / AGF; Pavlović 45'; Augustinsson 82' / Olsen (yellow card) 38'; Spelmann 48'; Ikonomidis (yellow card) 74'
47	9 April	Danish Superliga	28	H	Nordsjælland	1–1	TV3+	Report / Report link; Kick off / 18:00 CEST; Attendance / 17,294; Referee / Michael Johansen; Copenhagen / Nordsjælland; Verbič 54' (pen.); Kvist (yellow card) 90' / Pedersen (yellow card) 41'; Ingvartsen (yellow card) 53'; Ingvartsen 55'
48	17 April	Danish Superliga	29	A	Brøndby	1–0	TV3+	Report / Report link; Kick off / 16:00 CEST; Attendance / 23,405; Referee / Michael Johansen; Copenhagen / Brøndby; Verbič 65'; Toutouh (yellow card) 81' / Röcker (yellow card) 79'; Pukki (yellow card) 81'
49	23 April	Danish Superliga	30	H	Midtjylland	3–1	TV3+	Report / Report link; Kick off / 18:00 CEST; Attendance / 14,376; Referee / Jens Grabski Maae; Copenhagen / Midtjylland; Cornelius 7'; Cornelius (yellow card) 31'; Ankersen (yellow card) 35'; Zanka (yellow card) 35'; Cornelius 81'; Ankersen 84' / Novák (yellow card) 27'; Wikheim 87'
50	27 April	Danish Cup	Semi-finals	A	Vendsyssel FF	2–0	TV3+	Report / Report link; Kick off / 19:00 CEST; Attendance / 5,281; Referee / Michael Tykgaard; Copenhagen / Vendsyssel FF; Greguš 20'; Greguš (yellow card) 64'; Ankersen (yellow card) 69'; Kusk 74' / Jacobsen (red card) 70'
51	30 April	Danish Superliga	31	H	Lyngby Boldklub	3–0	Canal 9	Report / Report link; Kick off / 16:00 CEST; Attendance / 17,304; Referee / Mads-Kristoffer Kristoffersen; Copenhagen / Lyngby Boldklub; Pavlović 51'; Pavlović 54'; Pavlović 63' / Ørnskov (yellow card) 82'; Brandrup (yellow card) 90'
52	5 May	Danish Superliga	32	A	Nordsjælland	1–1	Canal 9	Report / Report link; Kick off / 19:00 CEST; Attendance / 8,180; Referee / Morten Krogh; Copenhagen / Nordsjælland; Kvist (yellow card) 56'; Cornelius 66'; Toutouh (yellow card) 76' / Lobotka (yellow card) 25'; Nelsson (yellow card) 31'; Ingvartsen 39'; Bartolec (yellow card) 49'; Marcondes (yellow card) 56'
53	14 May	Danish Superliga	33	H	Brøndby	1–0	TV3+	Report / Report link; Kick off / 18:00 CEST; Attendance / 24,842; Referee / Mads-Kristoffer Kristoffersen; Copenhagen / Brøndby; Kusk 13'; Kvist (yellow card) 51'; Verbič (yellow card) 75'; Johansson (yellow card) 79'; Greguš (yellow card) 87' / Mukhtar (yellow card) 41'; Austin (yellow card) 43'; Hermannsson (yellow card) 75'; Wilczek (yellow card) 79'
54	17 May	Danish Superliga	34	A	Midtjylland	2–3	Canal 9	Report / Report link; Kick off / 20:00 CEST; Attendance / 6,445; Referee / Anders Poulsen; Copenhagen / Midtjylland; Ankersen 14'; Ankersen 20'; Pavlović (yellow card) 55'; Toutouh (yellow card) 56'; Santander (yellow card) 78'; Cornelius (yellow card) 90' / Borring (yellow card) 35'; Johansson 41' (o.g.); Rømer (yellow card) 45'; Onuachu 50'; Duelund (yellow card) 52'; Dahlin (yellow card) 53'
55	21 May	Danish Superliga	35	A	Lyngby Boldklub	3–1	Canal 9	Report / Report link; Kick off / 13:00 CEST; Attendance / 4,256; Referee / Lars Christoffersen; Copenhagen / Lyngby Boldklub; Pavlović 90' / Rygaard 16'; Fosgaard (yellow card) 58'; Boysen (yellow card) 75'; Jónasson 79'; Odgaard 90'
56	25 May	Danish Cup	Final	N	Brøndby	3–1	TV3+	Report / Report link; Kick off / 17:00 CEST; Attendance / 32,140; Referee / Jens Maae; Copenhagen / Brøndby; Cornelius 51'; Cornelius (yellow card) 53'; Augustinsson (yellow card) 64'; Kvist (yellow card) 82'; Santander 83'; Cornelius 85' / Crone (yellow card) 53'; Pukki 61'; Nørgaard (yellow card) 71'; Wilczek (yellow card) 82'
57	28 May	Danish Superliga	36	H	SønderjyskE	2–0	TV3 Sport 1	Report / Report link; Kick off / 16:00 CEST; Attendance / 23,294; Referee / Anders Poulsen; Copenhagen / SønderjyskE; Santander 19'; Matić 30'; Zanka (yellow card) 79' / Uhre (yellow card) 33'; Rømer (yellow card) 49'

Last updated: 28 May
Source: FCK.dk
^{1}F.C. Copenhagen goals come first.
National flags for Ground and Opponent columns are only shown when different from that of F.C. Copenhagen.
M = Match; Ground: H = Home, A = Away, N = Neutral, HR = Home replacement, AR = Away replacement.
