= 2015–16 F.C. Copenhagen season =

F.C. Copenhagen
2015–16 season
- Chairman: Bo Rygaard
- Manager: Ståle Solbakken
- Danish Superliga: Winners
- Danish Cup: Winners
- UEFA Europa League: Third qualifying round
- Top goalscorer: League: Nicolai Jørgensen (15); All: Nicolai Jørgensen (19)
- Highest home attendance: 29,178 (vs Brøndby, 17 April 2016)
- Lowest home attendance: 7,513 (vs Viborg, 22 November 2015)
- Average home league attendance: 15,505
Home colours	Away colours	Third colours

This article shows statistics of individual players for the football club F.C. Copenhagen. It also lists all matches that F.C. Copenhagen played in the 2015–16 season.

== Players ==
=== Squad information ===
This section show the squad as currently, considering all players who are confirmedly moved in and out (see section Players in / out).

N	Pos.	Nat.	Name	Age	EU	Since	App	Goals	Ends	Transfer fee	Notes
1	GK	(Denmark)	Andersen	44	EU	2014	69	0	2018	Free	
2	RB	(Norway)	Høgli	42	EU	2014	57	1	2017	Free	
3	LB	(Sweden)	Augustinsson	32	EU	2015 (Winter)	59	3	2019	DKK 11 m	
4	CB	(Sweden)	Nilsson	43	EU	2014	35	2	2017	Free	
5	CB	(Sweden)	Johansson	37	EU	2016	16	0	2020	Undisclosed	
6	CM	(Denmark)	Kvist	41	EU	2015	313	15	2020	Free	
7	LW	(Slovenia)	Verbič	32	EU	2015	32	5	2019	DKK 6m	
8	CM	(Denmark)	Delaney	34	EU	2009	216	16	2017	Youth system	
9	ST	(Denmark)	Kadrii	35	EU	2014	38	4	2018	Undisclosed	
10	LW	(Denmark)	Jørgensen	35	EU	2012	137	52	2017	Undisclosed	
11	ST	(Denmark)	Cornelius	33	EU	2014	127	40	2018	DKK 27m	
13	CB	(Denmark)	Stadsgaard	41	EU	2012 (Winter)	74	2	2016	Free	
15	CB	(Sweden)	Antonsson	45	EU	2014	181	3	2016	Free	
17	RM	(Denmark)	Kusk	34	EU	2015	33	8	2020	Undisclosed	
18	DM	(Ghana)	Amartey	31	EU	2014	63	6	2019	DKK 14m	
19	CF	(Paraguay)	Santander	35	Non-EU	2015	36	17	2020	DKK 23m	
20	RB	(Denmark)	Remmer	33	EU	2012	66	0	2017	Youth system	
21	GK	(Sweden)	Wiland	45	EU	2009 (Winter)	192	0	2016	DKK 8m	
22	RB	(Denmark)	Ankersen	35	EU	2015	37	0	2016	Loan	
23	CF	(Germany)	Pourié	35	EU	2013	24	6	2017	DKK 10m	
24	AM	(Morocco) (Denmark)	Toutouh	33	EU	2011	102	12	2017	Free	
25	CB	(Denmark)	Zanka	36	EU	2014	224	16	2017	DKK 4 m	
28	GK	(Belgium)	Kaminski	33	EU	2015	8	0	2016	Loan	
31	GK	(Denmark)	Busk	32	EU	2012	7	0	2017	Youth system	
31	GK	(Sweden) (Denmark)	Olsen	36	EU	2016	14	0	2016	Loan	
32	SS	(Denmark)	Amankwaa	32	EU	2013	75	4	2017	Youth system	
33	ST	(Denmark)	Felfel	30	EU	2014	10	1	2016	Youth system	
34	CB	(Denmark)	Mathisen	30	EU	2015	4	0	2016	Youth system	
35	CM	(Denmark)	Wohlgemuth	31	EU	2014	3	0	2016	Youth system	
35	CM	(Ivory Coast)	Keita	28	EU	2016	3	0	2018	Youth system	
36	CM	(Faroe Islands)	Hendriksson	30	EU	2014	16	3	2017	Youth system	
41	GK	(Denmark)	Christensen	47	EU	2010	30	0	2015	Undisclosed	

- Last updated: 29 May
- Source: F.C. Copenhagen, players' Wikipedia articles, fck_kontrakter (for contract endings)
- Ordered by squad number.

=== Squad stats ===
				Total			Danish Superliga		UEFA Europa League		Danish Cup	
No.	Pos.	Nat.	Name	Sts	App	Gls	App	Gls	App	Gls	App	Gls
1	GK	(Denmark)	Andersen	21	21		17		4			
22	RB	(Norway)	Ankersen	33	37		30		4		3	
25	CB	(Denmark)	Zanka	40	40	4	31	2	3	1	6	1
18	DM	(Ghana)	Amartey	20	20		15		3		2	
3	LB	(Sweden)	Augustinsson	39	39	1	31	1	4		4	
17	RM	(Denmark)	Kusk	28	33	8	24	6	4	1	5	1
6	CM	(Denmark)	Kvist	29	39	2	31	1	2		6	1
8	CM	(Denmark)	Delaney	37	38	6	29	5	4		5	1
24	AM	(Morocco) (Denmark)	Toutouh	25	37	5	28	5	3		6	
10	LW	(Denmark)	Jørgensen	37	40	19	31	15	4	2	5	2
19	CF	(Paraguay)	Santander	33	37	17	31	14	2	1	4	2
7	LW	(Slovenia)	Verbič	24	32	5	26	3	4	2	2	
11	ST	(Denmark)	Cornelius	17	32	6	26	5			6	1
20	RB	(Denmark)	Remmer	9	23		17		1		5	
9	ST	(Denmark)	Kadrii	5	22	1	18	1			4	
15	CB	(Sweden)	Antonsson	16	20		13		2		5	
5	CB	(Sweden)	Johansson	15	16		13				3	
31	GK	(Sweden) (Denmark)	Olsen	14	14		14					
2	RB	(Norway)	Høgli	9	13		8		2		3	
28	GK	(Belgium)	Kaminski	8	8		2				6	
4	CB	(Sweden)	Nilsson	6	7		4		3			
32	SS	(Denmark)	Amankwaa	1	8	1	7				1	1
23	CF	(Germany)	Pourié	4	5	3	2	1	3	2		
36	CM	(Faroe Islands)	Hendriksson		4		1		2		1	
34	CB	(Denmark)	Mathisen		3		3					
35	CM	(Ivory Coast)	Keita	2	3		2				1	
37	CF	(Norway)	Kristoffersen		2		2					
13	CB	(Denmark)	Stadsgaard									
21	GK	(Sweden)	Wiland									
31	GK	(Denmark)	Busk									
33	ST	(Denmark)	Felfel									
35	CM	(Denmark)	Wohlgemuth									
41	GK	(Denmark)	Christensen									

Last updated: 29 May
Source: FCK.dk
Ordered by Starting 11 then appearances
0 shown as blank

=== Players in / out ===
==== In ====
No.	Pos.	Nat.	Name	Age	EU	Moving from	Type	Transfer window	Ends	Transfer fee	Source
7	LW	(Slovenia)	Verbič	21	EU	Celje (Slovenia)	Transfer	Summer	2019	DKK 6,000,000	FCK.dk
17	RM	(Denmark)	Kusk	23	EU	Twente (Netherlands)	Transfer	Summer	2020	Undisclosed	FCK.dk
22	RB	(Denmark)	Ankersen	24	EU	Red Bull Salzburg (Austria)	Loan	Summer	2016	n/a	FCK.dk
23	CF	(Germany)	Pourié	24	EU	SønderjyskE	End of loan	Summer	2017	n/a	
34	CB	(Denmark)	Mathisen	19	EU	Youth system	Promoted	Summer	2016	Youth system	FCK.dk
6	CM	(Denmark)	Kvist	30	EU	Wigan Athletic (England)	Transfer	Summer	2020	Free	FCK.dk
19	CF	(Paraguay)	Santander	24	Non-EU	Guaraní (Paraguay)	Transfer	Summer	2020	DKK 23,000,000	FCK.dk
28	GK	(Belgium)	Kaminski	22	EU	Anderlecht (Belgium)	Loan	Summer	2016	n/a	FCK.dk
31	GK	(Denmark)	Busk	22	EU	Sandefjord (Norway)	End of loan	Winter	2017	n/a	
35	CM	(Ivory Coast)	Keita	18	EU	Youth system	Promoted	Winter	2018	Youth system	FCK.dk
5	CB	(Sweden)	Johansson	27	EU	Gent (Belgium)	Transfer	Winter	2020	DKK 11,000,000	FCK.dk
31	GK	(Sweden) (Denmark)	Olsen	26	EU	PAOK (Greece)	Loan	Winter	2016	n/a	FCK.dk

==== Out ====
No.	Pos.	Nat.	Name	Age	EU	Moving to	Type	Transfer window	Transfer fee	Source
14	CF	(Iceland)	Sigurðarson	24	EU	Wolverhampton Wanderers (England)	End of loan	Summer	n/a	FCK.dk
16	RB	(Republic of Ireland)	Foley	30	EU	Ipswich Town (England)	Contract ended	Summer	Free	FCK.dk
29	DM	(Denmark)	Poulsen	35	EU		Contract ended	Summer	Free	FCK.dk
34	CB	(Denmark)	Lindbjerg	23	EU	AB Tårnby	Contract ended	Summer	Free	FCK.dk
22	CF	(Belgium)	De Ridder	28	EU	Zulte Waregem (Belgium)	Loan	Summer	n/a	Sporza.be
19	RM	(Iceland)	Gíslason	27	EU	1. FC Nürnberg (Germany)	Transfer	Summer	Undisclosed	FCN.de
21	GK	(Sweden)	Wiland	34	EU	Malmö FF (Sweden)	Transfer	Summer	Undisclosed	MFF.se
33	CF	(Denmark)	Felfel	19	EU	Vestsjælland	Transfer	Summer	Undisclosed	FCVVikings.dk
23	CF	(Germany)	Pourié	24	EU	Ufa (Russia)	Loan	Summer	n/a	
34	CM	(Denmark)	Wohlgemuth	20	EU	HB Køge	Transfer	Summer	Undisclosed	HBKoge.dk
36	CM	(Faroe Islands)	Hendriksson	20	EU	Vendsyssel FF	Loan	Winter	n/a	VendsysselFF.dk
31	GK	(Denmark)	Busk	22	EU	Union Berlin (Germany)	Transfer	Winter	Undisclosed	FC-Union-Berlin.de
18	DM	(Ghana)	Amartey	21	EU	Leicester City (England)	Transfer	Winter	DKK 60,000,000	LCFC.com

Last updated: 26 January

== Club ==
=== Coaching staff ===
Position	Staff
Head coach	(Norway) Ståle Solbakken
Assistant coach	(Sweden) Peter Wettergren
Goalkeeping coach	(Netherlands) Anton Scheutjens
Fitness coach	(Denmark) Anders Storskov

Last updated: 17 July
Source: F.C. Copenhagen

=== Other information ===
Chairman	(Denmark) Bo Rygaard
Technical director	(Denmark) Johan Lange
Club secretary	(Denmark) Daniel Rommedahl
Ground (capacity and dimensions)	Telia Parken (38,065 / 105x68 m)

Updated to match played 17 July
Source: F.C. Copenhagen and Telia Parken

== Competitions ==
=== Overall ===
Competition	Started round	Current position / round	Final position / round	First match	Last match
Danish Superliga	—	—	Winners	26 July	29 May
UEFA Europa League	Second qualifying round	—	Third qualifying round	16 July	6 August
Danish Cup	Third round	—	Winners	23 September	5 May

Updated to match played 29 May
Source: Competitions

=== Danish Superliga ===
==== League table ====
Pos	Team	Pld	W	D	L	GF	GA	GD	Pts	Qualification or relegation
1	Copenhagen (C)	33	21	8	4	62	28	+34	71	Qualification for the Champions League second qualifying round (Note: Copenhagen qualified for the Europa League second qualifying round by winning the 2015–16 Danish Cup. However, since they already qualified for European competition based on their league position, the spot awarded to the cup winners was passed down the league.)
2	SønderjyskE	33	19	5	9	56	36	+20	62	Qualification for the Europa League second qualifying round
3	Midtjylland	33	17	8	8	57	33	+24	59	Qualification for the Europa League first qualifying round
4	Brøndby	33	16	6	11	43	37	+6	54	Qualification for the Europa League first qualifying round
5	AaB	33	15	5	13	56	44	+12	50	

Source: DBU, Soccerway
Rules for classification: 1) Points; 2) Goal difference; 3) Goals scored; 4) Head-to-head points; 5) Head-to-head goal difference; 6) Head-to-head goals scored; 7) Head-to-head away goals scored; 8) Play-off on neutral ground (only if rankings are important for medals, teams for relegation or teams for UEFA competitions); 9) Draw.
(C) Champions

==== Results summary ====
Overall								Home						Away					
Pld	W	D	L	GF	GA	GD	Pts	W	D	L	GF	GA	GD	W	D	L	GF	GA	GD
33	21	8	4	62	28	+34	71	14	3	0	43	14	+29	7	5	4	19	14	+5

Last updated: 29 May.

==== Results by round ====
Round	1	2	3	4	5	6	7	8	9	10	11	12	13	14	15	16	17	18	19	20	21	22	23	24	25	26	27	28	29	30	31	32	33
Ground	H	A	A	H	A	H	A	H	H	A	H	H	A	H	A	H	A	H	H	A	H	A	H	A	H	A	H	A	A	H	A	A	H
Result	W	W	W	D	D	D	L	W	W	L	W	W	W	W	D	D	W	W	W	D	W	L	W	D	W	D	W	W	W	W	L	W	W

Updated to match(es) played on 29 May. Source: Competitive Matches
A = Away; H = Home; W = Win; D = Draw; L = Loss

=== UEFA Europa League ===
==== Second qualifying round ====
Team 1	Agg.	Team 2	1st leg	2nd leg
Copenhagen (Denmark)	5–1	(Wales) Newtown	2–0	3–1

Last updated: 23 July.
Source: UEFA Europa League

==== Third qualifying round ====
Team 1	Agg.	Team 2	1st leg	2nd leg
Jablonec (Czech Republic)	3–3 (a)	(Denmark) Copenhagen	0–1	3–2

Last updated: 6 August.
Source: UEFA Europa League

==== Results summary ====
Overall								Home						Away					
Pld	W	D	L	GF	GA	GD	Pts	W	D	L	GF	GA	GD	W	D	L	GF	GA	GD
4	3	0	1	8	4	+4	9	1	0	1	4	3	+1	2	0	0	4	1	+3

Last updated: 6 August.

== Matches ==
=== Competitive ===
Game	Date	Tournament	Round	Ground	Opponent	Score^{1}	TV	Report
1	17 July	UEFA Europa League	Second qualifying round	H	Newtown (Wales)	2–0	TV3+	Report / Report link; Kick off / 19:45 CEST; Attendance / 8,104; Referee / Mete Kalkavan; Copenhagen / Newtown; Verbič 3'; Kusk 74' / Sutton (yellow card) 73'; Oswell (yellow card) 79'
2	24 July	UEFA Europa League	Second qualifying round	A (Wales)	Newtown (Wales)	3–1	TV3 Sport 1	Report / Report link; Kick off / 18:45 BST; Referee / Stanislav Tudorov; Copenhagen / Newtown; Pourié (yellow card) 10'; Pourié 28'; Jørgensen 40' (pen.); Pourié 51' / Mitchell (yellow card) 24'; Oswell (yellow card) 31'; Mills-Evans (yellow card) 39'
3	26 July	Danish Superliga	2	A	Esbjerg fB	2–1	TV3+	Report / Report link; Kick off / 18:00 CEST; Attendance / 9,255; Referee / Peter Rasmussen; Copenhagen / Esbjerg fB; Pourié 25'; Jørgensen 41'; Kvist (yellow card) 56' / Fellah (yellow card) 74'; Vestergaard 84'
4	29 July	UEFA Europa League	Third qualifying round	A (Czech Republic)	Jablonec (Czech Republic)	1–0	TV3+	Report / Report link; Kick off / 18:00 CEST; Referee / Mattias Gestranius; Copenhagen / Jablonec; Verbič 51'; Delaney (yellow card) 56' / Hübschman (yellow card) 43'; Tecl (red card) 69'
5	2 August	Danish Superliga	3	A	SønderjyskE	3–1	Canal 9	Report / Report link; Kick off / 16:00 CEST; Attendance / 6,242; Referee / Michael Johansen; Copenhagen / SønderjyskE; Delaney (yellow card) 6'; Jørgensen 9' (pen.); Delaney (yellow card) 41'; Zanka (yellow card) 45'; Kvist 79' / Kanstrup 12'; Madsen (yellow card) 76'
6	6 August	UEFA Europa League	Third qualifying round	H	Jablonec (Czech Republic)	2–3	TV3+	Report / Report link; Kick off / 19:45 CEST; Attendance / 14,142; Referee / Leontios Trattou; Copenhagen / Jablonec; Kvist (yellow card) 52'; Santander (yellow card) 62'; Verbič (red card) 64'; Jørgensen 72'; Santander 88' / Wágner 14'; Greguš 53'; Wágner (yellow card) 60'; Greguš (yellow card) 78'; Mingazow (yellow card) 81'; Pospíšil 88'
7	9 August	Danish Superliga	4	H	Nordsjælland	1–1	Canal 9	Report / Report link; Kick off / 16:00 CEST; Attendance / 11,722; Referee / Jakob Kehlet; Copenhagen / Nordsjælland; Amartey (red card) 28'; Zanka 59' / Bruninho (yellow card) 33'; Bruninho 68'; Vingaard (yellow card) 78'
8	14 August	Danish Superliga	5	A	Midtjylland	0–0	TV3+	Report / Report link; Kick off / 18:00 CEST; Attendance / 10,822; Referee / Michael Tykgaard; Copenhagen / Midtjylland; Delaney (yellow card) 33'; Kvist (yellow card) 73'; Jørgensen (yellow card) 90' / Rømer (yellow card) 54'; Sviatchenko (yellow card) 76'
9	23 August	Danish Superliga	6	H	AGF	2–2	TV3+	Report / Report link; Kick off / 18:00 CEST; Attendance / 18,837; Referee / Lars Christoffersen; Copenhagen / AGF; Augustinsson 23'; Delaney (yellow card) 41'; Delaney 54' / Jønsson (yellow card) 22'; Andersen 38'; Bjarnason (yellow card) 78'; Nordstrand 89'
10	30 August	Danish Superliga	7	A	OB	0–1	TV3+	Report / Report link; Kick off / 18:00 CEST; Attendance / 10,039; Referee / Anders Poulsen; Copenhagen / OB; / Lund (yellow card) 10'; Jacobsen 62'; Bušuladžić (yellow card) 81'
11	13 September	Danish Superliga	8	H	AaB	4–2	Canal 9	Report / Report link; Kick off / 16:00 CEST; Attendance / 13,253; Referee / Jakob Kehlet; Copenhagen / AaB; Cornelius 18'; Kusk 49'; Kvist (yellow card) 57'; Jørgensen 61'; Pedersen 70' (o.g.) / Enevoldsen 10'; Spalvis 38'
12	16 September	Danish Superliga	1	H	Randers FC	3–0	Canal 9	Report / Report link; Kick off / 18:30 CEST; Attendance / 10,195; Referee / Anders Poulsen; Copenhagen / Randers FC; Verbič 23'; Toutouh 71'; Cornelius 74'; Cornelius (yellow card) 74' / Fenger (yellow card) 45'; Poulsen (yellow card) 90'
13	20 September	Danish Superliga	9	H	Hobro (Denmark)	1–0	Canal 9	Report / Report link; Kick off / 16:00 CEST; Attendance / 11,914; Referee / Michael Tykgaard; Copenhagen / Hobro; Cornelius 84' / Kirkevold (yellow card) 21'; Mikkelsen (yellow card) 73'; Sane (yellow card) 88'; Povlsen (yellow card) 90'
14	23 September	Danish Cup	Third round	A	Vestsjælland (Denmark)	2–0	TV3+	Report / Report link; Kick off / 18:00 CEST; Attendance / 1,493; Referee / Michael Johansen; Copenhagen / Vestsjælland; Santander 7'; Ankersen (yellow card) 63'; Cornelius 76'
15	27 September	Danish Superliga	10	A	Brøndby	0–1	TV3+	Report / Report link; Kick off / 13:00 CEST; Attendance / 22,281; Referee / Jakob Kehlet; Copenhagen / Brøndby; Kusk (yellow card) 69' / Schwartz (yellow card) 4'; Albrechtsen 78'
16	4 October	Danish Superliga	11	H	Viborg FF	1–0	Canal 9	Report / Report link; Kick off / 16:00 CEST; Attendance / 13,141; Referee / Kenn Hansen; Copenhagen / Viborg FF; Toutouh 52'
17	18 October	Danish Superliga	12	H	Hobro (Denmark)	3–1	TV3+	Report / Report link; Kick off / 18:00 CEST; Attendance / 10,458; Referee / Jakob Kehlet; Copenhagen / Hobro; Santander 31'; Kusk 58'; Kusk 69' / Tamboura (yellow card) 73'; George 81'
18	25 October	Danish Superliga	13	A	SønderjyskE	2–1	Canal 9	Report / Report link; Kick off / 16:00 CET; Attendance / 8,210; Referee / Benjamin Helm Svedborg; Copenhagen / SønderjyskE; Andersen (yellow card) 45'; Jørgensen (yellow card) 45'; Santander 57'; Cornelius 68' / Sigurðsson (yellow card) 29'; Absalonsen 45' (pen.); Drachmann (yellow card) 66'
19	29 October	Danish Cup	Fourth round	A	Fredericia (Denmark)	2–1	TV3+	Report / Report link; Kick off / 18:15 CET; Attendance / 2,649; Referee / Mads-Kristoffer Kristoffersen; Copenhagen / Fredericia; Amankwaa 28'; Kusk 92' / Ćatović (yellow card) 38'; Hagelskjær 43'; Podstavek (yellow card) 116'
20	1 November	Danish Superliga	14	H	Randers FC	4–0	Canal 9	Report / Report link; Kick off / 16:00 CET; Attendance / 16,492; Referee / Peter Rasmussen; Copenhagen / Randers FC; Kusk 9'; Kvist (yellow card) 13'; Toutouh 26'; Toutouh 52'; Kusk 58' / Ishak (yellow card) 17'; Lundberg (yellow card) 81'; Fenger (yellow card) 84'
21	8 November	Danish Superliga	15	A	Brøndby	0–0	TV3+	Report / Report link; Kick off / 18:00 CET; Attendance / 25,102; Referee / Mads-Kristoffer Kristoffersen; Copenhagen / Brøndby; Delaney (yellow card) 17'; Santander (yellow card) 57'; Santander (yellow card) 59' (yellow-red card); Ankersen (yellow card) 90' / Austin (yellow card) 57'; Elmander (yellow card) 90'
22	22 November	Danish Superliga	16	H	Viborg FF	0–0	Canal 9	Report / Report link; Kick off / 16:00 CET; Attendance / 7,785; Referee / Anders Poulsen; Copenhagen / Viborg FF; Zanka (yellow card) 66' / Grønning (yellow card) 70'; Curth (yellow card) 85'
23	6 December	Danish Superliga	18	H	OB	4–1	TV3+	Report / Report link; Kick off / 18:00 CET; Attendance / 14,636; Referee / Kenn Hansen; Copenhagen / OB; Zanka 16'; Zanka 27'; Jørgensen 69'; Nielsen 75' (o.g.) / Jacobsen 88'
24	28 February	Danish Superliga	19	H	Esbjerg fB	2–1	Canal 9	Report / Report link; Kick off / 16:00 CET; Attendance / 16,874; Referee / Anders Poulsen; Copenhagen / Esbjerg fB; Kvist (yellow card) 6'; Santander 26'; Verbič (yellow card) 38'; N. Jørgensen 54' / Paulsen 41'; Stenderup (yellow card) 55'; J. Jørgensen (yellow card) 69'
25	3 March	Danish Superliga	17	A	Midtjylland	1–0	TV3+	Report / Report link; Kick off / 20:00 CET; Attendance / 9,522; Referee / Michael Tykgaard; Copenhagen / Midtjylland; Kvist (yellow card) 52'; Jørgensen 61'; Johansson (yellow card) 80' / Banggaard (yellow card) 34'; Onuachu (yellow card) 43'; Ureña (yellow card) 79'
26	6 March	Danish Superliga	20	A	AGF	0–0	TV3+	Report / Report link; Kick off / 18:00 CET; Attendance / 9,225; Referee / Jørgen Daugbjerg Burchardt; Copenhagen / AGF; Zanka (red card) 14'; Cornelius (yellow card) 51' / Pedersen (yellow card) 80'
27	13 March	Danish Superliga	21	H	AaB	6–2	TV3+	Report / Report link; Kick off / 18:00 CET; Attendance / 16,296; Referee / Jakob Kehlet; Copenhagen / AaB; Santander 8'; Kusk 11'; Jørgensen 40'; Santander 47'; Toutouh 75'; Cornelius (yellow card) 77'; Cornelius 82' / Würtz (yellow card) 31'; Risgård 37'; Risgård (yellow card) 65'; Enevoldsen 68'
28	16 March	Danish Cup	Fifth round	H	Randers FC	2–1	TV3+	Report / Report link; Kick off / 17:00 CET; Attendance / 7,513; Referee / Lars Christoffersen; Copenhagen / Randers FC; Santander 60'; Zanka (yellow card) 90'; Delaney (yellow card) 94'; Zanka 116' / Lundberg (yellow card) 31'; Tverskov (yellow card) 32'; Marxen (yellow card) 58'; Junker 90'
29	20 March	Danish Superliga	22	A	Nordsjælland	0–2	Canal 9	Report / Report link; Kick off / 16:00 CET; Attendance / 7,351; Referee / Jens Maae; Copenhagen / Nordsjælland; Kvist (yellow card) 78' / Mor 55'; Mikkelsen 87'
30	3 April	Danish Superliga	23	H	SønderjyskE	1–0	Canal 9	Report / Report link; Kick off / 16:00 CEST; Attendance / 15,842; Referee / Michael Johansen; Copenhagen / SønderjyskE; Verbič 43'; Kusk (yellow card) 77' / Guira (yellow card) 57'; Absalonsen (yellow card) 83'; Pedersen (yellow card) 85'; Songani (yellow card) 90'
31	6 April	Danish Cup	Semi-finals	H	Brøndby	1–1	TV3+	Report / Report link; Kick off / 18:00 CEST; Attendance / 20,611; Referee / Michael Tykgaard; Copenhagen / Brøndby; Delaney (yellow card) 18'; Delaney 83' / Pukki 27'; Greko (yellow card) 68'
32	10 April	Danish Superliga	24	A	Randers FC	1–1	Canal 9	Report / Report link; Kick off / 16:00 CEST; Attendance / 5,705; Referee / Peter Rasmussen; Copenhagen / Randers FC; Verbič (yellow card) 28'; Cornelius (yellow card) 65'; Santander 77'; Delaney (yellow card) 81' / Fisker (yellow card) 53'; Masango (yellow card) 59'; Fisker 72'
33	17 April	Danish Superliga	25	H	Brøndby	2–0	TV3+	Report / Report link; Kick off / 18:00 CEST; Attendance / 29,178; Referee / Mads-Kristoffer Kristoffersen; Copenhagen / Brøndby; Jørgensen 39' (pen.); Kvist (yellow card) 45'; Jørgensen 73' / Durmisi (yellow card) 39'; Larsson (yellow card) 45'; Elmander (yellow card) 78'
34	20 April	Danish Cup	Semi-finals	A	Brøndby	1–0	TV3+	Report / Report link; Kick off / 20:00 CEST; Attendance / 18,005; Referee / Jakob Kehlet; Copenhagen / Brøndby; Jørgensen 78'; Johansson (yellow card) 82'
35	24 April	Danish Superliga	26	A	Viborg FF	1–1	Canal 9	Report / Report link; Kick off / 16:00 CEST; Attendance / 4,437; Referee / Michael Johansen; Copenhagen / Viborg FF; Delaney 89' / Kamper 9'; Pallesen (yellow card) 59'; Egeris (yellow card) 76'; Fochive (yellow card) 85'; Fochive (yellow card) 90' (red card)
36	1 May	Danish Superliga	27	H	Midtjylland	5–3	TV3+	Report / Report link; Kick off / 18:00 CEST; Attendance / 18,089; Referee / Jens Maae; Copenhagen / Midtjylland; Delaney 5'; Santander 9'; Verbič 51'; Jørgensen 78' (pen.); Jørgensen (yellow card) 81'; Jørgensen 85'; Johansson (yellow card) 86'; Cornelius (yellow card) 90' / Nissen (yellow card) 41'; Pušić 51'; Poulsen 60'; Poulsen 83'; Bodurov (yellow card) 90'
37	5 May	Danish Cup	Final	N	AGF	2–1	TV3+	Report / Report link; Kick off / 17:00 CEST; Attendance / 35,828; Referee / Mads-Kristoffer Kristoffersen; Copenhagen / AGF; Verbič (yellow card) 11'; Jørgensen 29'; Delaney (yellow card) 45'; Kvist 78'; Cornelius (yellow card) 89' / Duncan 45'; D.A. Pedersen (yellow card) 45'; S. Petersen (yellow card) 72'; Khodzhaniyazov (yellow card) 89'
38	8 May	Danish Superliga	28	A	OB	1–0	Canal 9	Report / Report link; Kick off / 16:00 CEST; Attendance / 9,911; Referee / Jakob Kehlet; Copenhagen / OB; Verbič (yellow card) 13'; Santander 40' / Barrett (yellow card) 26'
39	12 May	Danish Superliga	29	A	AaB	2–0	TV3+	Report / Report link; Kick off / 20:00 CEST; Attendance / 10,036; Referee / Peter Kjærsgaard-Andersen; Copenhagen / AaB; Santander 32'; Cornelius (yellow card) 67'; Kvist (yellow card) 78' / Abildgaard (yellow card) 24'; Pedersen (yellow card) 36'; Enevoldsen (yellow card) 40'
40	16 May	Danish Superliga	30	H	Nordsjælland	2–0	Canal 9	Report / Report link; Kick off / 16:00 CEST; Attendance / 23,063; Referee / Jørgen Daugbjerg Burchardt; Copenhagen / Nordsjælland; Kvist (yellow card) 16'; Santander 63'; Santander (yellow card) 64'; Santander 67'; Delaney (yellow card) 76' / Køhler (yellow card) 43'
41	22 May	Danish Superliga	31	A	Hobro (Denmark)	2–4	Canal 9	Report / Report link; Kick off / 16:00 CEST; Attendance / 3,144; Referee / Jakob Kehlet; Copenhagen / Hobro; Keita (yellow card) 32'; Amankwaa (yellow card) 41'; Kadrii 66'; Jørgensen 85' / Park 9'; Christensen (yellow card) 21'; George 24'; George 48'; Andreasen 69'
42	26 May	Danish Superliga	32	A	Esbjerg fB	4–1	Eurosport 2	Report / Report link; Kick off / 20:00 CEST; Attendance / 6,089; Referee / Christoffersen; Copenhagen / Esbjerg fB; Delaney (yellow card) 15'; Santander 61'; Jørgensen 67' (pen.); Santander 69'; Jørgensen 81' / Lekven (yellow card) 15'; Mensah 33'
43	29 May	Danish Superliga	33	H	AGF	2–1	TV3+	Kick off / 17:00 CEST; Attendance / 27,466; Referee / Michael Johansen; Copenhagen / AGF; Delaney 79'; Santander 85' / Backman (yellow card) 26'; Duncan (yellow card) 40'; Juel (yellow card) 56'; Duncan 66'; Jønsson (yellow card) 69'; Rasmussen (yellow card) 78'

Last updated: 29 May
Source: FCK.dk
^{1}F.C. Copenhagen goals come first.
National flags for Ground and Opponent columns are only shown when different from that of F.C. Copenhagen.
M = Match; Ground: H = Home, A = Away, N = Neutral, HR = Home replacement, AR = Away replacement.
