= Mads Roerslev =

Danish footballer (born 1999)

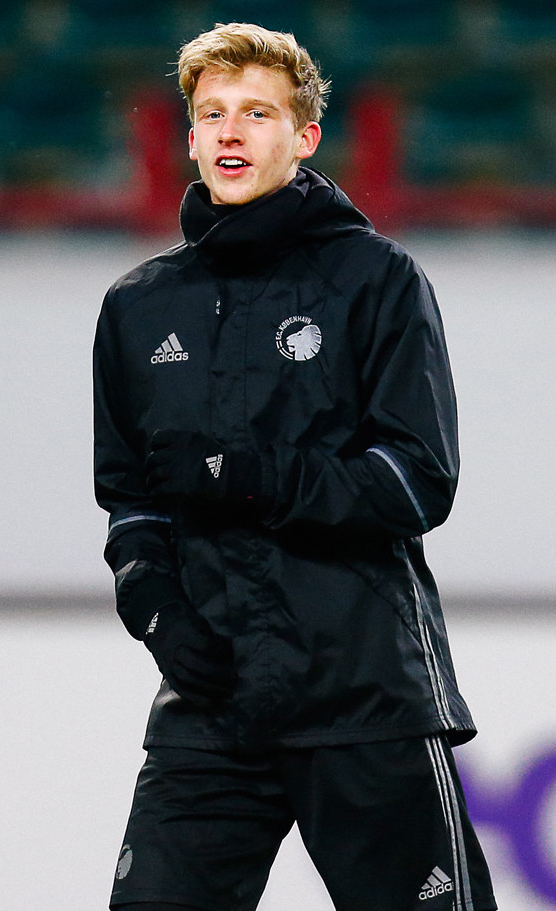
- Roerslev warming up with Copenhagen in 2017

Personal information
- Full name: Mads Roerslev Rasmussen
- Date of birth: 24 June 1999 (age 27)
- Place of birth: Copenhagen, Denmark
- Height: 1.84 m (6 ft 0 in)
- Positions: Right-back; right wing-back

Team information
- Current team: Southampton
- Number: 2

Youth career
- –2017: Copenhagen

Senior career*
Years	Team	Apps	(Gls)
2017–2019	Copenhagen	5	(0)
2017	→ Halmstads BK (loan)	1	(0)
2019	→ Vendsyssel (loan)	4	(0)
2019–2025	Brentford	121	(2)
2025	→ VfL Wolfsburg (loan)	7	(0)
2025–	Southampton	10	(0)

International career^{‡}
2015–2016	Denmark U17	16	(0)
2016–2017	Denmark U18	3	(0)
2017–2018	Denmark U19	10	(1)
2018–2019	Denmark U20	4	(0)
2019–2021	Denmark U21	6	(0)
2024–	Denmark	1	(0)
- * Club domestic league appearances and goals as of 15:26, 21 November 2026 (UTC) ‡ National team caps and goals as of 15:13, 1 July 2025 (UTC)

Mads Roerslev Rasmussen (Danish pronunciation: [ˈmas ˈʁɶɐ̯s.le̝w]; born 24 June 1999) is a Danish professional footballer who plays as a right-back or right wing-back for EFL Championship club Southampton and the Denmark national team.

Roerslev is a product of the F.C. Copenhagen academy. A fringe player after signing a professional contract, he transferred to English club Brentford in 2019 and was a part of the squad which was promoted to the Premier League in 2021. He made 146 appearances for the club prior to his transfer to Southampton in 2025. Roerslev was capped by Denmark at youth level and made his senior debut in 2024.

== Club career ==
=== FC Copenhagen ===
A right-back, Roerslev progressed through the academy at F.C. Copenhagen and made his senior debut as a second-half substitute for Frederik Bay in a Danish Cup third round match versus Jammerbugt FC on 26 October 2016. He capped a dream debut with a goal in the 6–1 victory. Roerslev made four further appearances during the 2016–17 season and signed a new four-year contract in May 2017. He worked to improve his one-on-one defending with experienced right-back Tom Høgli.

Down the pecking order at the Parken Stadium, Roerslev appeared sparingly during the 2017–18 and 2018–19 seasons. He spent time away on loan at Halmstads BK and Vendsyssel FF, but made few appearances for either club, which hindered his development. Entering the 2019–20 season completely out of favour, Roerslev departed F.C. Copenhagen in August 2019, after making 13 appearances and scoring one goal during three seasons as a senior player at the club.

=== Brentford ===
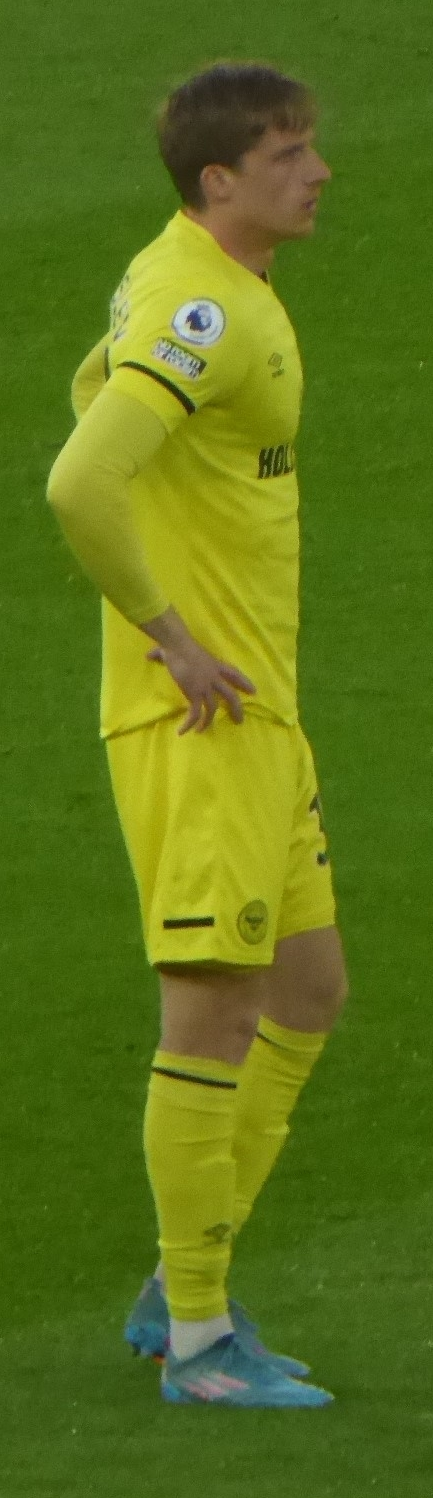
Roerslev playing for Brentford in July 2021

==== 2019–2022 ====
On 7 August 2019, Roerslev moved to England to join the B team at Championship club Brentford on a two-year contract, with the option of a further year, for an undisclosed nominal fee. Roerslev broke into the first team squad in October 2019 and by March 2020, after 10 appearances, his performances led to him signing a new four-year contract and promotion into the first team squad. Roerslev ended the 2019–20 season with 14 appearances.

A metatarsal injury suffered on international duty saw Roerslev miss the first four months of the 2020–21 season. He returned to match play in early January 2021 and after a number of substitute cameos, an injury to his mentor, Henrik Dalsgaard, allowed him to break into the starting lineup in early April. He held onto his place until the end of the regular season and through the play-offs, which culminated in promotion to the Premier League after victory in the 2021 Championship play-off final, during which he assisted Emiliano Marcondes for one of the goals. Roerslev finished a breakthrough 2020–21 season with 22 appearances.

Following the release of first-choice right-back Henrik Dalsgaard, a change in formation to 3-5-2 saw Roerslev begin the 2021–22 season behind stand-in right wing-back Sergi Canós in the pecking order. The pair traded the position during the season. Approaching the midway point of the season, mounting injuries in the central defensive positions saw Roerslev deployed in a right centre-back role. He finished the 2021–22 season with 26 appearances and one goal, scored with the winner in a 2–1 Premier League victory over Aston Villa on 2 January 2022.

==== 2022–2024 ====
After beginning the 2022–23 season behind new signing Aaron Hickey and right-sided defender Kristoffer Ajer in the right-back pecking order, injuries to both players led to Roerslev assuming the starting right-back role in mid-October 2022. He signed a new three-year contract in February 2023 and finished the season with 23 appearances.

The early months of 2023–24 mirrored that of the previous season, with injury to Aaron Hickey in late-October 2023 allowing Roerslev to take over the starting right-back role. He ended the campaign with a season-high 38 appearances and one goal, scored in a 2–2 draw with Chelsea on 2 March 2024.

==== 2024–2025 ====
Owing to Brentford entering the 2024–25 season without either first-choice full-back, Roerslev was again the only recognised right-back available and competed for the position with stand-ins Kristoffer Ajer and Sepp van den Berg. He made 23 appearances prior to joining Bundesliga club VfL Wolfsburg on loan for the remainder of the season on 27 January 2025. Roerslev made just seven appearances during the remainder of the season, predominantly as a substitute. The loan had included an option to buy at the end of the 2024–25 season, which was not taken up.

With former loan right-back Michael Kayode signed permanently and dual-sided Aaron Hickey fit again, Roerslev remained an unused substitute during the opening match of the 2025–26 season. Four days later, he transferred out of the club. Roerslev ended his Brentford career on 146 appearances and two goals.

=== Southampton ===
On 21 August 2025, Roerslev transferred to Championship club Southampton and signed a four-year contract for an undisclosed fee. He made his first appearance for the club on 23 August in a 2–1 home defeat against Stoke City. Following his return from international duty in October, Roerslev missed the next two matches due to Achilles bursitis. On 25 October, he returned from injury in a 2–1 defeat against Blackburn Rovers. In February 2026, manager Tonda Eckert revealed Roerslev underwent successful surgery on his Achilles tendon and was expected to miss the remainder of the season.

== International career ==
Roerslev was capped by Denmark at every level between U17 and U21. He was a member of the Danes' 2016 U17, 2018 U19 and 2021 U21 UEFA European Championship squads.

In May 2022, Roerslev was called into the senior team's training camp prior to its opening 2022–23 Nations League A matches. Following the withdrawal of Alexander Bah, Roerslev won his maiden call into the Denmark squad for a pair of friendly matches in March 2024 and he remained an unused substitute in both. Two defensive suspensions saw Roerslev win his second call-up for a Nations League A match versus Switzerland on 15 October 2024 and he again remained an unused substitute. Injury to Joakim Mæhle saw Roerslev receive his third call-up for the following pair of Nations League A matches in November 2024. He made his debut with a start in the second match, a 0–0 draw with Serbia.

== Style of play ==
A right-back, Roerslev "is very good offensively – he is a good crosser of the ball, very good one-on-one, quick and energetic to get up and down the pitch. He is also good defending one-on-one".

== Personal life ==
Roerslev was a Manchester United supporter while growing up.

== Career statistics ==
=== Club ===
As of match played 21 November 2026

Appearances and goals by club, season and competition
Club	Season	League			National cup (Note: Includes Danish Cup, FA Cup, DFB-Pokal)		League cup (Note: Includes EFL Cup)		Europe		Other		Total	
Club	Season	Division	Apps	Goals	Apps	Goals	Apps	Goals	Apps	Goals	Apps	Goals	Apps	Goals
Copenhagen	2016–17	Danish Superliga	3	0	2	1	―		0	0	―		5	1
Copenhagen	2017–18	Danish Superliga	2	0	1	0	―		0	0	―		3	0
Copenhagen	2018–19	Danish Superliga	0	0	1	0	―		4 (Note: Appearances in UEFA Europa League)	0	―		5	0
Copenhagen	Total		5	0	4	1	―		4	0	―		13	1
Halmstads BK (loan)	2017	Allsvenskan	1	0	―		―		―		―		1	0
Vendsyssel FF (loan)	2018–19	Danish Superliga	4	0	1	0	―		―		1 (Note: Appearance in Danish Superliga relegation play-offs)	0	6	0
Brentford	2019–20	Championship	11	0	2	0	0	0	―		1 (Note: Appearance(s) in Championship play-offs)	0	14	0
Brentford	2020–21	Championship	17	0	2	0	0	0	―		3	0	22	0
Brentford	2021–22	Premier League	20	1	2	0	3	0	―		―		26	1
Brentford	2022–23	Premier League	20	0	1	0	2	0	―		―		23	0
Brentford	2023–24	Premier League	34	1	2	0	2	0	―		―		38	1
Brentford	2024–25	Premier League	19	0	1	0	3	0	―		―		23	0
Brentford	2025–26	Premier League	0	0	―		―		―		―		0	0
Brentford	Total		121	2	11	0	10	0	―		4	0	146	2
VfL Wolfsburg (loan)	2024–25	Bundesliga	7	0	0	0	―		―		―		7	0
Southampton	2025–26	Championship	9	0	0	0	1	0	—		0	0	10	0
Southampton	2026–27	Championship	1	0	0	0	0	0	—		—		1	0
Southampton	Total		10	0	0	0	1	0	—		0	0	11	0
Career total			150	2	15	1	11	0	4	0	4	0	194	3

=== International ===
As of match played 18 November 2024

Appearances and goals by national team and year
National team	Year	Apps	Goals
Denmark	2024	1	0
Total		1	0

== Honours ==
Brentford

- EFL Championship play-offs: 2021
