= Andrija Pavlović =

Serbian footballer (born 1993)

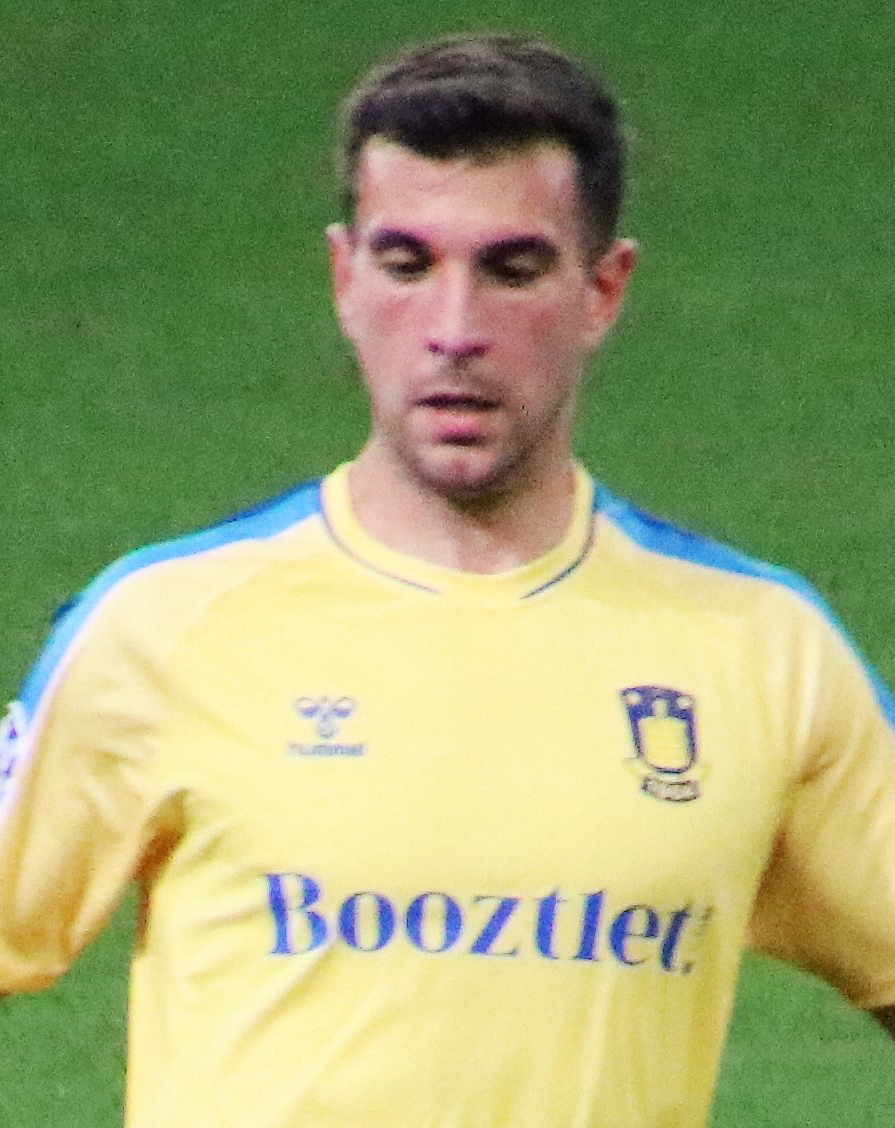
- Pavlović in 2021

Personal information
- Date of birth: 16 November 1993 (age 32)
- Place of birth: Belgrade, FR Yugoslavia
- Height: 1.89 m (6 ft 2 in)
- Position: Forward

Youth career
- Policajac
- 2008–2013: Rad

Senior career*
Years	Team	Apps	(Gls)
2011–2014	Rad	17	(1)
2011–2012	→ Palić (loan)	21	(5)
2012	→ BASK (loan)	9	(6)
2014–2016	Čukarički	61	(19)
2016–2018	Copenhagen	55	(15)
2018–2020	Rapid Wien	20	(4)
2019–2020	→ APOEL (loan)	21	(5)
2020–2022	Brøndby	38	(4)
2022–2024	Partizan	18	(2)
2024	Budućnost	9	(2)

International career^{‡}
2012	Serbia U20	1	(0)
2015	Serbia U23	1	(0)
2016	Serbia	5	(0)
- * Club domestic league appearances and goals as of 7 December 2024 ‡ National team caps and goals as of 23 October 2016

Andrija Pavlović (Serbian Cyrillic: Андрија Павловић, pronounced [ǎndrija pǎːʋloʋitɕ]; born 16 November 1993) is a Serbian professional footballer who plays as a forward.

== Club career ==
=== Rad ===
Born in Belgrade, FR Yugoslavia Pavlović made his first football steps with Policajac. Later, he moved in Rad, where he was trained by Marko Nikolić. He made his senior debut in the last fixture of 2010–11 Serbian SuperLiga. Later, he was loaned to Palić and BASK where he has gained senior experience, before he was promoted to the first team. Pavlović scored his first senior goal for Rad in a match against Radnički Kragujevac, played on 14 September 2013. He was also scored in a cup match against Borac Čačak on 25 September the same year. After 10 years spent with Rad, he left the club in the 2013–14 winter break.

=== Čukarički ===
Pavlović joined Čukarički at the beginning of 2014. After recovering from a knee surgery, he made 4 appearances in the remainder of the 2013–14 season. In the 2014–15 season, he made 21 league and 4 cup appearances and scored 1 goal against Napredak Kruševac in the first SuperLiga fixture, played on 9 August 2014. During the season, he made 12 starts and usually played as a winger. After the departure of Nikola Stojiljković, Pavlović became first-choice striker for the 2015–16 season, and signed a new four-year contract until summer 2019. He opened the season scoring a hat-trick in the first fixture against Vojvodina. Later, he was a scorer in both matches against OFK Beograd and scored both goals in a 2–7 defeat to Red Star Belgrade in the first half of the season. He also scored 2 goals in a cup match against Mokra Gora. After scoring 10 goals in 5 matches in April 2016 he was nominated as player of the month.

=== Copenhagen ===
On 9 June 2016, Pavlović signed a five-year contract with Copenhagen. Pavlović was included in the club's starting line-up from the onset, and made his debut in the opening match of the 2016–17 season against Lyngby on 16 July 2016. Pavlolić played as a regular in the Copenhagen attack in the autumn of 2016 and contributed with a goal in the qualifying match for the 2016–17 UEFA Champions League against Cypriot club APOEL. Despite making many appearances during the autumn of 2016, Pavlović struggled with his goalscoring, a trend which continued through the spring of 2017, where he, however, scored a hat-trick in 13 minutes against Lyngby. As part of the Copenhagen team he won the Danish Superliga championship as well as the Danish Cup in 2016–17 season.

In the 2017–18 season, Pavlović scored another hat-trick, this time against Slovak side MŠK Žilina in a UEFA Champions League qualifier, but in the spring season Pavlović faced limited playing time and dropped in the depth chart hierarchy behind Federico Santander, Pieros Sotiriou, Viktor Fischer and Jonas Wind. In April 2018 he was sold to Austrian club Rapid Wien. Pavlović made a total of 83 appearances in all tournaments for Copenhagen, in which he scored 22 goals.

=== Rapid Wien ===
In April 2018, Rapid Wien announced that Pavlović would join the club for the 2018–19 season having agreed a contract until 2021. For the 2019–20 season, Pavlović was loaned to APOEL in Cyprus. Before his season with the club ended prematurely due to the COVID-19 pandemic, he made 21 appearances in the Cypriot First Division, in which he scored five goals. After the loan ended, he returned to Rapid for the 2020–21 season, but was demoted to the reserve team.

=== Brøndby ===
On 19 September 2020, Danish Superliga club Brøndby IF announced that they had signed Pavlović on a four-year deal. Regarded as a controversial transfer due to his past with Brøndby arch-rivals FC Copenhagen, Pavlović commented: "I have great respect for the fact that it may not be my jersey which becomes a best-seller because of my time with FC Copenhagen, but that does not change my intention of coming to Brøndby IF, because I want to win matches, and I think that I can contribute and make a difference for the club".

He made his debut for the club on 18 October in a 2–0 away loss to SønderjyskE, coming on as a second-half substitute for Simon Hedlund. He scored his first goal for his new team on 8 November in a 3–1 home win over OB. Pavlović fell out with an injury during a match against Lyngby Boldklub on 30 November, and he was sidelined the following months.

On 19 July 2022, after a largely unsuccessful spell, his contract was terminated by mutual consent, making him a free agent. He made 47 appearances for Brøndby in which he scored seven goals.

=== Partizan ===
On 2 August 2022, Pavlović joined Partizan on a two-year contract. He made his debut for the club against Vojvodina on 2 October, coming on as a substitute in the 66th minute for Ricardo Gomes. His first goal came on 16 October, helping his side to a 3–2 win over his former club Čukarički.

== International career ==
Pavlović appeared for U20 selection. In 2013, he was called up to the Serbia national under-21 football team under coach Radovan Ćurčić for some friendly matches. In 2015, he was added to the Serbia U23 team by Milan Rastavac for a friendly match against Qatar U23.

After impressing during the 2015–16 season with Čukarički in the Serbian SuperLiga, Slavoljub Muslin selected him for Serbia national football team for several friendly matches in 2016. Pavlović made his first appearance for the Serbia national football team in a 2–1 friendly win against Cyprus in May 2016. He only earned 5 caps (no goals), all in 2016.

== Career statistics ==
=== Club ===
As of match played 14 April 2022

Appearances and goals by club, season and competition
Club	Season	League			Cup		Europe		Total	
Club	Season	Division	Apps	Goals	Apps	Goals	Apps	Goals	Apps	Goals
Rad	2010–11	Serbian SuperLiga	1	0	0	0	—		1	0
Rad	2012–13	Serbian SuperLiga	2	0	0	0	—		2	0
Rad	2013–14	Serbian SuperLiga	14	1	1	1	—		15	2
Rad	Total		17	1	1	1	0	0	18	2
Palić (loan)	2011–12	Serbian League Vojvodina	21	5	—		—		21	5
BASK (loan)	2012–13	Serbian League Belgrade	9	6	—		—		9	6
Čukarički	2013–14	Serbian SuperLiga	4	0	—		—		4	0
Čukarički	2014–15	Serbian SuperLiga	21	1	4	0	4	0	29	1
Čukarički	2015–16	Serbian SuperLiga	36	18	2	2	4	0	42	20
Čukarički	Total		61	19	6	2	8	0	75	21
Copenhagen	2016–17	Danish Superliga	35	8	4	1	11	2	50	11
Copenhagen	2017–18	Danish Superliga	20	7	1	0	12	4	33	11
Copenhagen	Total		55	15	5	1	23	6	83	22
Rapid Wien	2018–19	Austrian Bundesliga	20	4	5	4	4	0	29	8
APOEL (loan)	2019–20	Cypriot First Division	21	5	2	0	13	5	36	10
Brøndby	2020–21	Danish Superliga	20	4	1	0	—		21	4
Brøndby	2021–22	Danish Superliga	18	0	2	3	6	0	26	3
Brøndby	Total		38	4	3	3	6	0	47	7
Partizan	2022–23	Serbian SuperLiga	18	2	0	0	6	0	24	2
Partizan	2023–24	Serbian SuperLiga	0	0	0	0	1	0	1	0
Partizan	Total		18	2	0	0	7	0	25	2
Career total			260	61	22	11	61	11	343	83

=== International ===
Appearances and goals by national team and year
National team	Year	Apps	Goals
Serbia	2016	5	0
Total		5	0

== Honours ==
Čukarički

- Serbian Cup: 2014–15

Copenhagen

- Danish Superliga: 2016–17
- Danish Cup: 2016–17

Brøndby

- Danish Superliga: 2020–21
