= Danny Amankwaa =

Danish footballer (born 1994)

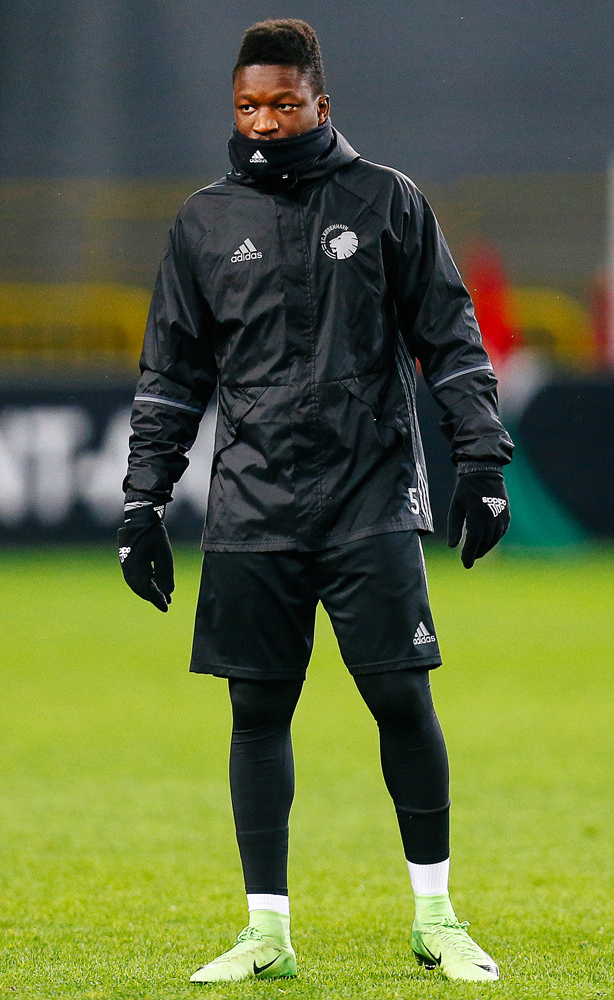

Personal information
- Full name: Danny Kwasi Amankwaa
- Date of birth: 30 January 1994 (age 32)
- Place of birth: Lundby, Denmark
- Height: 1.76 m (5 ft 9 in)
- Position: Winger

Youth career
- Brønshøj
- Copenhagen

Senior career*
Years	Team	Apps	(Gls)
2012–2018	Copenhagen	68	(1)
2018–2019	Heart of Midlothian	13	(0)
2019	SønderjyskE	24	(1)
2020–2023	Hobro	67	(2)

International career
2009–2010	Denmark U16	7	(0)
2009–2011	Denmark U17	24	(4)
2011–2012	Denmark U18	9	(0)
2012–2013	Denmark U19	9	(2)
2012–2013	Denmark U20	7	(1)
2013–2015	Denmark U21	5	(0)
- * Club domestic league appearances and goals as of 17 June 2023, 11:00 (UTC)

Danny Kwasi Amankwaa (born 30 January 1994) is a Danish professional footballer who plays as a winger. He previously played for F.C. Copenhagen, Heart of Midlothian and Denmark at youth level.

He is of Ghanaian descent.

== Career ==
=== FC Copenhagen ===
Amankwaa was followed by clubs such as Ajax and Arsenal in 2012, but he wanted to play for FC Copenhagen. He was also on a trial at Chelsea and he revealed in 2012 that he had more trial offers, but he rejected them.

Amankwaa played his first Danish Superliga match on 29 October 2012, when he appeared as a substitute for Martin Vingaard against AC Horsens at Casa Arena Horsens in Horsens. Previously, Amankwaa played in a Danish Cup match on 26 September 2012 against FC Fredericia. His contract was extended in November 2012 until July 2015. Amankwaa scored his first goal for F.C. Copenhagen in the 3–0 Danish Cup win against SønderjyskE on 1 November 2012.

Amankwaa was promoted permanently to the first team in 2013. The contract was extended once again in May 2014 until 2017. He played 9 league matches for the first team in the 2012–13 season, and 15 matches in the second season.

In May 2015, Amankwaa suffered from an achilles tendon rupture and was out for about half a year. He went back on the pitch in October 2015, but just one month later he was back on the sideline again. He injured his meniscus and that resulted in an operation, and was out for the rest of the year. Due to all these injuries, he only played 7 league games in that season.

The injuries continued in the next season and he was operated in October 2016 for a knee injury, which kept him out for the rest of the year. His contract was extended in November 2016 until 2018.

=== Heart of Midlothian ===
On 25 January 2018, Amankwaa joined Heart of Midlothian (Hearts) on a free transfer, having been allowed to leave Copenhagen before the end of his contract. He signed an 18-month contract with the Scottish Premiership side.

=== SønderjyskE ===
With limited success in Scotland, Amankwaa went home to Denmark, signing a one-year contract with Danish Superliga-side, SønderjyskE. He left the club by the end of 2019.

=== Hobro IK ===
Amankwaa remained without club until 31 October 2020, where he signed with Danish 1st Division club Hobro IK for the rest of 2020. After three years, Amankwaa left Hobro in June 2023.

== Career statistics ==
As of 27 January 2018

Appearances and goals by club, season and competition
Club	Season	League			National Cup		League Cup		Other		Total	
Club	Season	Division	Apps	Goals	Apps	Goals	Apps	Goals	Apps	Goals	Apps	Goals
F.C. Copenhagen	2012–13	Danish Superliga	9	0	2	1	–		1	0	12	1
F.C. Copenhagen	2013–14	Danish Superliga	15	0	3	0	–		1	0	19	0
F.C. Copenhagen	2014–15	Danish Superliga	23	1	1	0	–		9	0	33	1
F.C. Copenhagen	2015–16	Danish Superliga	7	0	1	1	–		0	0	8	1
F.C. Copenhagen	2016–17	Danish Superliga	8	0	1	0	–		3	0	12	0
F.C. Copenhagen	2017–18	Danish Superliga	6	0	0	0	–		5	0	11	0
F.C. Copenhagen	Total		68	1	8	2	0	0	19	0	95	3
Heart of Midlothian	2017–18	Scottish Premiership	11	0	1	0	0	0	—		12	0
Heart of Midlothian	2018–19	Scottish Premiership	2	0	0	0	2	0	—		4	0
Career total			81	1	9	2	2	0	19	0	111	3

== Honours ==
- Danish Superliga: 2012–13, 2015–16, 2016–17
- Danish Cup: 2014–15, 2015–16, 2016–17
