= Benjamin Verbič =

Slovenian footballer (born 1993)

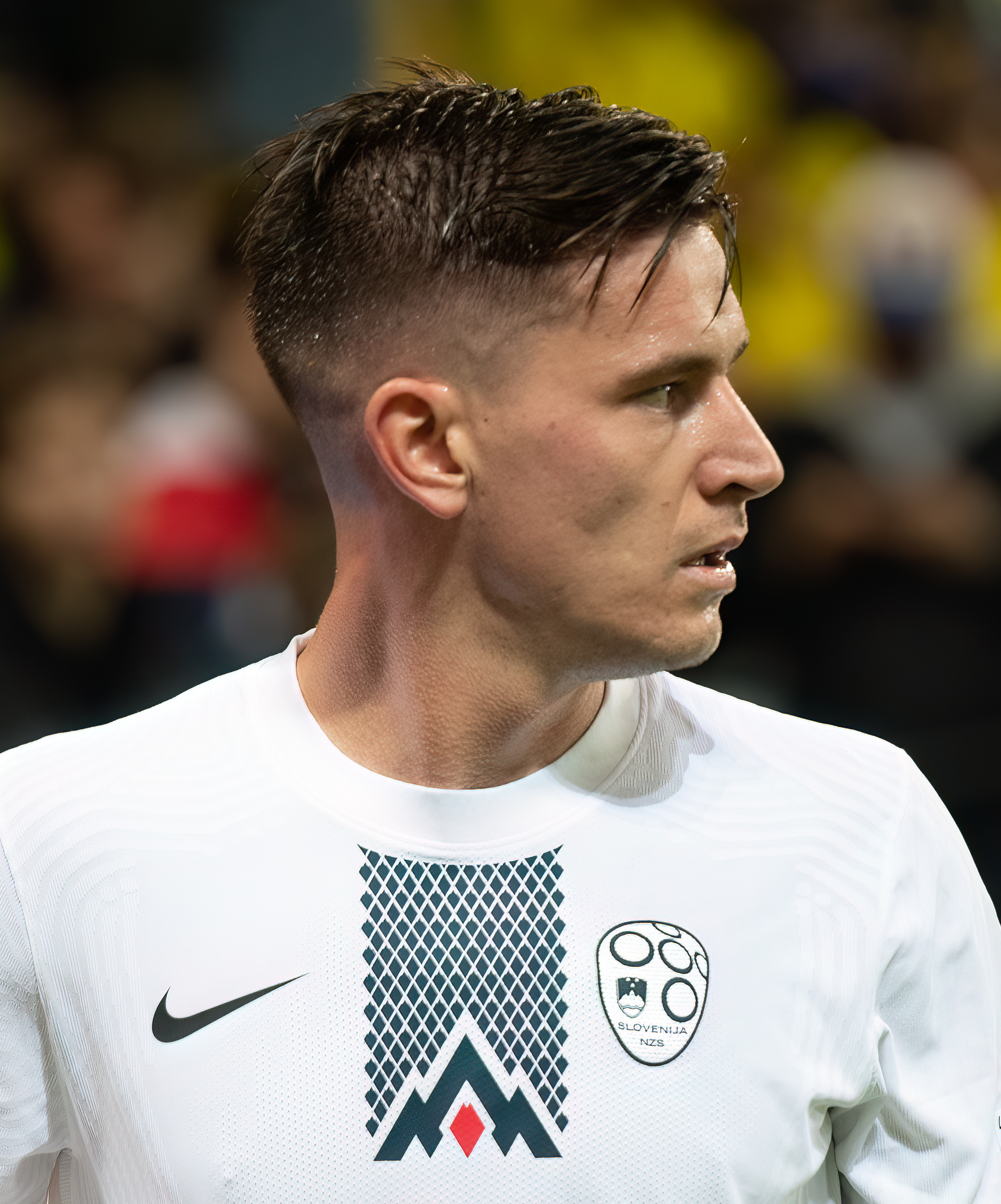
- Verbič with Slovenia in 2022

Personal information
- Date of birth: 27 November 1993 (age 32)
- Place of birth: Celje, Slovenia
- Height: 1.79 m (5 ft 10 in)
- Position: Left winger

Team information
- Current team: Celje
- Number: 7

Youth career
- Vojnik
- –2012: Celje

Senior career*
Years	Team	Apps	(Gls)
2011–2015	Celje	103	(29)
2012	→ Šampion (loan)	3	(0)
2015–2017	Copenhagen	69	(16)
2018–2022	Dynamo Kyiv	79	(27)
2022	→ Legia Warsaw (loan)	7	(0)
2022–2024	Panathinaikos	48	(6)
2025–2026	Levadiakos	31	(7)
2026–	Celje	1	(0)

International career^{‡}
2012	Slovenia U19	3	(0)
2013	Slovenia U20	2	(0)
2013–2014	Slovenia U21	5	(1)
2015–	Slovenia	67	(7)
- * Club domestic league appearances and goals as of 8 August 2026 ‡ National team caps and goals as of 16 November 2026

Benjamin Verbič (born 27 November 1993) is a Slovenian professional footballer who plays as a left winger for Slovenian PrvaLiga club Celje and the Slovenia national team.

Verbič began his senior career with his hometown club Celje, where he made a total of 126 appearances and scored 35 goals in all competitions. With Celje, he was the runner-up of the Slovenian PrvaLiga in 2014–15, and a three-time runner-up of the Slovenian Football Cup. In 2015 Verbič transferred to Copenhagen, where he won a double of Danish Superliga and Danish Cup in both of his full seasons. In January 2018, he signed for Dynamo Kyiv, with whom he won a league and two cup titles, before temporarily moving to Polish club Legia Warsaw when the Russian invasion of Ukraine started.

Having represented Slovenia at various youth levels, Verbič made his senior debut in March 2015 against Qatar.

== Club career ==
=== Celje ===
Born in Celje, Verbič made his Slovenian PrvaLiga debut for hometown club Celje on 29 May 2011 in a 3–2 home defeat to Primorje, replacing Iztok Močivnik for the last 24 minutes in his only appearance of the season.

He made twelve league appearances the following season (eight starts), contributing a first career goal on 3 April 2012, a consolation goal in a 2–1 home defeat against Olimpija Ljubljana. On 23 May 2012, in the 2011–12 Slovenian Football Cup final against already-crowned league winners Maribor, Verbič scored in extra time in a 2–2 draw but missed the first penalty as his team lost in a shoot-out.

Verbič made 26 league appearances for Celje in the 2012–13 season, scoring 3 goals. On 24 August he was loaned to Šampion of the Slovenian Second League, where he made three appearances, two as a starter. Celje again reached the cup final, losing 1–0 to Maribor at Bonifika Stadium in Koper on 29 May 2013, with Verbič playing the entire match. In the quarter-final first leg on 24 October 2012, he scored both of the team's goals to defeat Dravinja, netting in the second minute and in added time.

On 25 October 2014, Verbič scored a first career hat-trick in a 5–0 home win against Radomlje.

=== Copenhagen ===
On 27 April 2015, Verbič signed a four-year contract with Copenhagen, to join at the end of the season. He scored two minutes into his debut on 16 July, a 2–0 home win over Newtown of Wales in the UEFA Europa League second qualifying round. His Danish Superliga debut came ten days later, playing the entirety of a 3–1 win at Esbjerg on the first day of the season, and his first league goal on 16 September, opening their 3–0 home win over Randers.

Copenhagen won the Danish Superliga and Danish Cup double in both of Verbič's full seasons. On 17 April 2017, he scored the only goal in a Copenhagen Derby win against Brøndby IF.

=== Dynamo Kyiv ===
On 23 December 2017, Verbič signed a five-year contract with the Ukrainian Premier League side Dynamo Kyiv. In 2018 he was recognized as the player of the month in the Ukrainian Premier League on three occasions, in May, July, and August 2018.

On 8 July 2020, Verbič scored the equalizing goal in the final of the Ukrainian Cup. He would also convert his penalty kick in the shoot-out, after the match finished 1–1 after extra time, with Dynamo prevailing 8–7 over Vorskla Poltava.

=== Legia Warsaw ===
In March 2022, Verbič left Kyiv because of the Russian invasion of Ukraine. His contract with Dynamo was suspended under new FIFA rules, which allowed players to sign with clubs outside Ukraine until 30 June 2022. Therefore, he joined Ekstraklasa side Legia Warsaw for the remainder of the 2021–22 season. On 31 May 2022, he left the club following the expiration of his contract.

=== Panathinaikos ===
On 29 July 2022, Verbič signed a three-year deal with Super League Greece club Panathinaikos.

== International career ==
On 30 March 2015, Verbič made his debut for the Slovenia national team, starting in an eventual 1–0 friendly defeat to Qatar at the Jassim Bin Hamad Stadium in Doha. He scored his first international goal on 11 November 2016 in an away win over Malta in the 2018 FIFA World Cup qualification.

On 20 November 2023, Verbič scored the winning goal for Slovenia in the 86th minute in a 2–1 victory over Kazakhstan, which qualified his country for UEFA Euro 2024, their first European Championship appearance since 2000 and their first major tournament since the 2010 World Cup.

== Career statistics ==
=== Club ===
As of match played 25 July 2024

Appearances and goals by club, season and competition
Club	Season	League			National cup (Note: Includes Slovenian Cup, Danish Cup, Ukrainian Cup, Polish Cup, Greek Cup)		Continental		Other		Total	
Club	Season	Division	Apps	Goals	Apps	Goals	Apps	Goals	Apps	Goals	Apps	Goals
Celje	2010–11	Slovenian PrvaLiga	1	0	0	0	—		—		1	0
Celje	2011–12	Slovenian PrvaLiga	12	1	3	2	—		—		15	3
Celje	2012–13	Slovenian PrvaLiga	26	3	6	3	2 (Note: Appearances in UEFA Europa League)	0	—		34	6
Celje	2013–14	Slovenian PrvaLiga	32	10	3	0	2	0	—		37	10
Celje	2014–15	Slovenian PrvaLiga	32	15	7	1	—		—		39	16
Celje	Total		103	29	19	6	4	0	—		126	35
Šampion (loan)	2012–13	Slovenian Second League	3	0	—		—		—		3	0
Copenhagen	2015–16	Danish Superliga	26	3	2	0	4	2	—		32	5
Copenhagen	2016–17	Danish Superliga	27	6	3	0	10 (Note: Nine appearances in UEFA Champions League, one appearance in UEFA Europa League)	0	—		40	6
Copenhagen	2017–18	Danish Superliga	16	7	0	0	11 (Note: Six appearances in UEFA Champions League, five appearances in UEFA Europa League)	4	—		27	11
Copenhagen	Total		69	16	5	0	25	6	—		99	22
Dynamo Kyiv	2017–18	Ukrainian Premier League	12	4	2	1	0	0	—		14	5
Dynamo Kyiv	2018–19	Ukrainian Premier League	21	7	1	0	11 (Note: Four appearances in UEFA Champions League, seven appearances in UEFA Europa League)	5	1 (Note: Appearance in Ukrainian Super Cup)	0	34	12
Dynamo Kyiv	2019–20	Ukrainian Premier League	25	11	4	1	7 (Note: Two appearances in UEFA Champions League, five appearances in UEFA Europa League)	2	1	0	37	14
Dynamo Kyiv	2020–21	Ukrainian Premier League	12	3	0	0	9 (Note: Appearances in UEFA Champions League)	0	0	0	21	3
Dynamo Kyiv	2021–22	Ukrainian Premier League	9	2	1	1	3	0	0	0	13	3
Dynamo Kyiv	2022–23	Ukrainian Premier League	0	0	0	0	2	0	0	0	2	0
Dynamo Kyiv	Total		79	27	8	3	32	7	2	0	121	37
Legia Warsaw (loan)	2021–22	Ekstraklasa	7	0	1	0	—		—		8	0
Panathinaikos	2022–23	Super League Greece	26	2	3	1	—		—		29	3
Panathinaikos	2023–24	Super League Greece	22	4	2	0	4	0	—		28	4
Panathinaikos	2024–25	Super League Greece	0	0	0	0	1	0	—		1	0
Panathinaikos	Total		48	6	5	1	5	0	0	0	58	7
Career total			309	78	38	10	66	13	2	0	415	101

=== International ===
As of match played 16 November 2026

Appearances and goals by national team and year
National team	Year	Apps	Goals
Slovenia	2015	1	0
Slovenia	2016	8	1
Slovenia	2017	6	1
Slovenia	2018	6	1
Slovenia	2019	8	2
Slovenia	2020	5	0
Slovenia	2021	4	0
Slovenia	2022	9	0
Slovenia	2023	9	1
Slovenia	2024	5	0
Slovenia	2025	3	1
Slovenia	2026	3	0
Total		67	7

Scores and results list Slovenia's goal tally first, score column indicates score after each Verbič goal.

List of international goals scored by Benjamin Verbič
No.	Date	Venue	Cap	Opponent	Score	Result	Competition
1	11 November 2016	National Stadium, Ta' Qali, Malta	8	Malta	1–0	1–0	2018 FIFA World Cup qualification
2	4 September 2017	Stožice Stadium, Ljubljana, Slovenia	13	Lithuania	3–0	4–0	2018 FIFA World Cup qualification
3	16 November 2018	Stožice Stadium, Ljubljana, Slovenia	20	Norway	1–0	1–1	2018–19 UEFA Nations League C
4	9 September 2019	Stožice Stadium, Ljubljana, Slovenia	25	Israel	1–0	3–2	UEFA Euro 2020 qualification
5	9 September 2019	Stožice Stadium, Ljubljana, Slovenia	25	Israel	3–2	3–2	UEFA Euro 2020 qualification
6	20 November 2023	Stožice Stadium, Ljubljana, Slovenia	56	Kazakhstan	2–1	2–1	UEFA Euro 2024 qualification
7	10 June 2025	Stadion Z'dežele, Celje, Slovenia	63	Bosnia and Herzegovina	1–0	2–1	Friendly

== Honours ==
Copenhagen

- Danish Superliga: 2015–16, 2016–17
- Danish Cup: 2015–16, 2016–17

Dynamo Kyiv

- Ukrainian Premier League: 2020–21
- Ukrainian Cup: 2019–20, 2020–21
- Ukrainian Super Cup: 2018, 2019, 2020

Panathinaikos

- Greek Cup: 2023–24
