= Nicklas Røjkjær =

Danish footballer (born 1998)

Personal information
- Date of birth: 24 July 1998 (age 28)
- Place of birth: Gødvad, Silkeborg, Denmark
- Height: 1.79 m (5 ft 10 in)
- Position: Midfielder

Team information
- Current team: FC Nordsjælland
- Number: 8

Youth career
- Silkeborg

Senior career*
Years	Team	Apps	(Gls)
2015–2016	Silkeborg	2	(0)
2016–2017	Copenhagen	0	(0)
2017–2019	Viborg	34	(6)
2019–2020	Esbjerg fB	10	(0)
2020–2022	Silkeborg	29	(4)
2022–2024	Fredericia	50	(17)
2024–2025	Mjällby AIF	40	(8)
2025–	Nordsjælland	30	(3)

International career
2013–2014	Denmark U16	7	(1)
2014–2015	Denmark U17	12	(2)
2015–2016	Denmark U18	4	(1)
2016–2017	Denmark U19	4	(0)
- * Club domestic league appearances and goals as of 18 October 2026

Nicklas Røjkjær (born 24 July 1998) is a Danish footballer who plays for Danish Superliga side FC Nordsjælland.

== Career ==
=== Viborg ===
On 27 January 2018, Danish 1st Division club Viborg FF announced the signing of Røjkjær from FC Copenhagen's U19/reserve setup after his release, with the move aimed at giving him first-team opportunities

=== Esbjerg fB ===
On 1 July 2019, Danish Superliga club Esbjerg fB announced the signing of Røjkjær from 1st Division side Viborg FF on a four-year contract, purchasing him for an undisclosed fee as he approached the final six months of his contract at Viborg.

=== Silkeborg ===
On 4 October 2020, Danish 1st Division club Silkeborg IF announced the return signing of Røjkjær from Esbjerg fB on a contract until summer 2024.

=== Fredericia ===
On 20 June 2022, Danish 1st Division club FC Fredericia announced the signing of Røjkjær from Superliga side Silkeborg IF on a two‑year contract, aiming to provide him with more first‑team playing time.

=== Mjällby ===
On 15 January 2024 Swedish Allsvenskan club Mjällby AIF confirmed that they had acquired Røjkjær from FC Fredericia. However, the move would not take effect until 1 July 2024, and the player signed a contract until the end of 2027. On the transfer window's deadline day, 1 February 2024, the Swedish club confirmed that they had bought Røjkjær on a free transfer and that Røjkjær was joining the club with immediate effect.

=== FC Nordsjælland ===
On 6 July 2025, Danish Superliga club FC Nordsjælland announced the signing of Røjkjær from Allsvenskan's Mjällby.

== Career statistics ==
As of match played 18 October 2026

Appearances and goals by club, season and competition
Club	Season	League			Cup		Europe		Other		Total	
Club	Season	Division	Apps	Goals	Apps	Goals	Apps	Goals	Apps	Goals	Apps	Goals
Silkeborg	2015–16	Danish 1st Division	2	0	—		—		—		2	0
Copenhagen	2016–17	Danish Superliga	0	0	2	0	0	0	0	0	2	0
Viborg	2017–18	Danish 1st Division	6	0	0	0	—		—		6	0
Viborg	2018–19	Danish 1st Division	28	6	2	0	—		—		30	6
Viborg	Total		34	6	2	0	—		—		36	6
Esbjerg fB	2019–20	Danish Superliga	9	0	0	0	1 (Note: Appearances in UEFA Europa League)	0	—		10	0
Esbjerg fB	2020–21	Danish Superliga	1	0	1	0	0	0	—		2	0
Esbjerg fB	Total		10	0	1	0	1	0	—		12	0
Silkeborg	2020–21	Danish 1st Division	19	3	1	0	—		—		20	3
Silkeborg	2021–22	Danish Superliga	10	1	2	0	—		—		12	1
Silkeborg	Total		29	4	3	0	—		—		32	4
Fredericia	2022–23	Danish 1st Division	32	12	2	1	—		—		34	13
Fredericia	2023–24	Danish 1st Division	18	5	6	6	—		—		24	11
Fredericia	Total		50	17	8	7	—		—		58	24
Mjällby AIF	2024	Allsvenskan	28	3	4	1	—		—		32	4
Mjällby AIF	2025	Allsvenskan	14	5	3	0	—		—		17	5
Mjällby AIF	Total		42	8	7	1	—		—		49	9
Nordsjælland	2025–26	Danish Superliga	22	2	3	2	—		—		25	4
Nordsjælland	2026–27	Danish Superliga	8	1	0	0	7 (Note: Appearances in UEFA Conference League)	3	—		15	4
Nordsjælland	Total		30	3	3	2	7	3	—		40	8
Career total			197	28	26	11	7	3	0	0	231	51
