= Federico Santander =

Paraguayan footballer (born 1991)

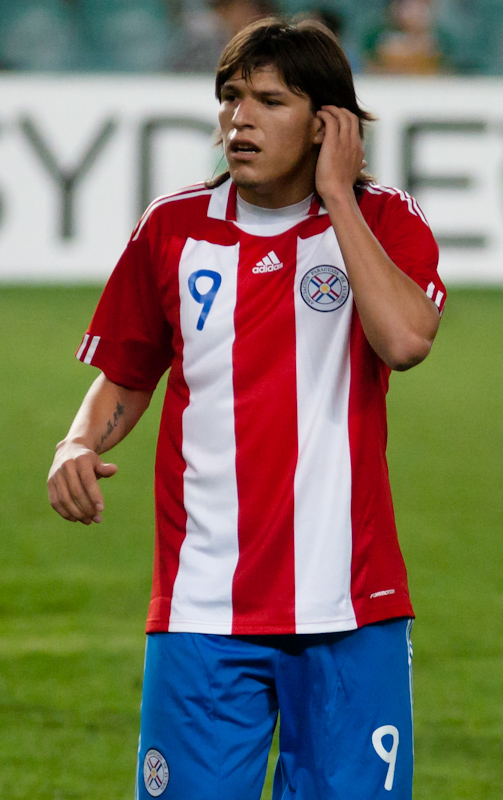
- Santander with Paraguay in 2010

Personal information
- Full name: Federico Javier Santander Mereles
- Date of birth: 4 June 1991 (age 35)
- Place of birth: San Lorenzo, Paraguay
- Height: 1.87 m (6 ft 2 in)
- Position: Striker

Team information
- Current team: Luqueño
- Number: 9

Youth career
- 2005–2008: Guaraní

Senior career*
Years	Team	Apps	(Gls)
2008–2012	Guaraní	51	(18)
2010–2011	→ Toulouse (loan)	23	(5)
2012	Racing Club	15	(0)
2012–2013	Tigre	18	(1)
2013–2015	Guaraní	58	(21)
2015–2018	Copenhagen	82	(38)
2018–2022	Bologna	67	(10)
2022–2023	Reggina	3	(0)
2023	→ Guaraní (loan)	25	(5)
2024	Nacional	21	(10)
2025–	Luqueño	12	(0)

International career^{‡}
2009	Paraguay U20	12	(6)
2010–2019	Paraguay	20	(2)
- * Club domestic league appearances and goals as of 13 August 2025 ‡ National team caps and goals as of 20 November 2018

Federico Javier Santander Mereles (born 4 June 1991) is a Paraguayan professional footballer who plays as a forward for Uruguayan club Nacional and the Paraguay national team.

== Club career ==
=== Early career ===
Santander started in the youth divisions of Guaraní where he excelled and was part of the under-20 squad that won the international friendly championship held in Valencia, Spain. After winning the U20 tournament with Guaraní he attracted the interest of several clubs and had a trial with A.C. Milan. In 2008, at the age of 16, he made his debut with the senior squad of Guaraní by scoring a goal in the 5–2 win against Tacuary. On 31 August 2010, he signed for French side Toulouse.

=== Argentina: Racing and Tigre ===
In February 2012, he moved to Racing Club on a three-year contract with a purchase option for 20% of his sports rights.

In July 2012, Santander joined Argentine Primera División side Tigre on a one-year loan deal despite that Guaraní had intentions to bring him back to Paraguay. He was handed the number #24 shirt for the 2012–13 season and debuted in a 2–1 home defeat against Estudiantes de La Plata on 6 August 2012.

=== Copenhagen ===
On 14 June 2015, Santander signed a five-year contract with the Danish Superliga team F.C. Copenhagen. He joined the club after completing Copa Libertadores with Guaraní. He made his league debut on 2 August 2015 against SønderjyskE making two assist, assisting Thomas Delaney and William Kvist. Three days later, he scored his first goal in a 3–2 defeat against FK Jablonec as Copenhagen failed to qualify for the UEFA Europa League group stage. On 16 May 2016, he netted twice to give his club a 2–0 win against FC Nordsjælland which crowned Copenhagen league champions. In his first season in Copenhagen he became the third highest goalscorer with 14 goals and four assists.

On 24 August 2016, Santander's goal in Copenhagen's qualification match versus Cypriot club APOEL secured his club's position in the 2016–17 Champions League.

=== Bologna ===
In June 2018 Santander signed a four-year contract with Italian club Bologna in a deal worth €6 million.

=== Reggina ===
On 2 August 2022, Santander moved to Reggina on a multi-year contract.

==== Return to Guaraní ====
On 27 January 2023, Santander returned to Guaraní on loan until 30 June 2023.

== International career ==
On 28 September 2009, at the 2009 FIFA U-20 World Cup in Egypt, Santander scored the first goal for the Paraguay U-20 squad against home team Egypt, giving the Paraguayans a 1–0 lead.

Wearing the number 9 as a replacement for Roque Santa Cruz, he debuted for Paraguay on 9 October 2010 in a 1–0 loss against Australia in Sydney.

== Career statistics ==
=== Club ===
As of match played 10 June 2023

Appearances and goals by club, season and competition
Club	Season	League			National cup (Note: Includes Coupe de France, Copa Argentina, Danish Cup, Coppa Italia)		Continental		Total	
Club	Season	Division	Apps	Goals	Apps	Goals	Apps	Goals	Apps	Goals
Guaraní	2009	Paraguayan Primera División			–		1	0	1	0
Guaraní	2010	Paraguayan Primera División	3	0	–		–		3	0
Guaraní	2011	Paraguayan Primera División	22	10	–		–		22	10
Guaraní	2012	Paraguayan Primera División	1	2	–		–		1	2
Guaraní	Total		26	12	–		1	0	27	12
Toulouse (loan)	2010–11	Ligue 1	23	5	2	0	–		25	5
Racing	2011–12	Argentine Primera División	15	0	3	0	–		18	0
Tigre	2011–12	Argentine Primera División	0	0	0	0	5	1	5	1
Tigre	2012–13	Argentine Primera División	18	1	0	0	6	1	24	2
Tigre	Total		18	1	0	0	11	2	29	3
Guaraní	2013	Paraguayan Primera División	16	5	0	0	4 (Note: Appearances in Copa Sudamericana)	2	20	7
Guaraní	2014	Paraguayan Primera División	22	11	0	0	2 (Note: Appearances in Copa Libertadores)	0	24	11
Guaraní	2015	Paraguayan Primera División	17	5	0	0	12	6	29	11
Guaraní	Total		55	21	0	0	18	8	73	29
Copenhagen	2015–16	Danish Superliga	30	14	4	2	2 (Note: Appearances in UEFA Europa League)	1	36	17
Copenhagen	2016–17	Danish Superliga	28	12	3	1	13 (Note: Nine appearances and four goals in UEFA Champions League, four appearances in UEFA Europa League)	4	44	17
Copenhagen	2017–18	Danish Superliga	24	12	0	0	8 (Note: Six appearances and two goals in UEFA Champions League, two appearances in UEFA Europa League)	2	32	14
Copenhagen	Total		82	38	7	3	23	7	112	48
Bologna	2018–19	Serie A	32	8	2	0	–		34	8
Bologna	2019–20	Serie A	24	1	1	0	–		5	1
Bologna	2020–21	Serie A	4	0	1	0	–		5	0
Bologna	2021–22	Serie A	7	1	0	0	–		7	1
Bologna	Total		67	10	4	0	–		71	10
Guaraní (loan)	2023	Paraguayan Primera División	13	3	0	0	6	5	19	8
Career total			299	90	16	3	59	22	374	115

=== International ===
Scores and results list Paraguay's goal tally first, score column indicates score after each Santander goal.

List of international goals scored by Federico Santander
No.	Date	Venue	Opponent	Score	Result	Competition
1	4 June 2011	Estadio Ramón Tahuichi Aguilera, Santa Cruz de la Sierra, Bolivia	Bolivia	2–0	2–0	Friendly
2	20 November 2018	Moses Mabhida Stadium, Durban, South Africa	South Africa	1–0	1–1	Friendly

== Honours ==
Copenhagen

- Danish Superliga: 2015–16, 2016–17
- Danish Cup: 2015–16, 2016–17
