= Marcus Mathisen =

Danish footballer (born 1996)

Personal information
- Date of birth: 27 February 1996 (age 30)
- Place of birth: Albertslund, Denmark
- Height: 1.85 m (6 ft 1 in)
- Position: Centre-back

Team information
- Current team: St. Pauli
- Number: 6

Youth career
- –2015: Copenhagen

Senior career*
Years	Team	Apps	(Gls)
2015–2016	Copenhagen	4	(0)
2016–2018	Halmstads BK	67	(6)
2019–2020	Falkenbergs FF	43	(3)
2021–2023	IK Sirius	64	(6)
2023–2024	SV Wehen Wiesbaden	31	(0)
2024–2026	1. FC Magdeburg	63	(3)
2026–	St. Pauli	3	(1)

International career
2012	Denmark U16	3	(0)
2012–2013	Denmark U17	4	(0)
2013–2014	Denmark U18	2	(0)
2015	Denmark U19	5	(0)
- * Club domestic league appearances and goals as of 30 August 2026

Marcus Mathisen (born 27 February 1996) is a Danish professional footballer who plays as centre-back for German 2. Bundesliga club St. Pauli.

== Club career ==
=== FC Copenhagen ===
In the spring 2015, Mathisen trained with the F.C. Copenhagen first team and played several matches for the reserve team. He was in the squad for the 2015 Danish Cup Final, but remained on the bench for the whole match. Three days later, Mathisen made his first team debut, when he replaced Daniel Amartey in a 2–0 loss against FC Midtjylland.

Mathisen was permanently promoted to the first team squad on 13 July 2015.

=== Halmstads BK ===
On 20 November 2016, Mathisen scored two goals in the last play-off leg against Helsingborg at Olympia, which meant 3–2 on aggregate and advancement to 2017 Allsvenskan.

=== Falkenbergs FF ===
It was confirmed on 10 December 2018, that Mathisen had signed with Falkenbergs FF until 2020.

=== IK Sirius ===
On 4 January 2021, Mathisen joined IK Sirius as a free-agent; he signed a contract until 2023.

=== Wehen Wiesbaden ===
On 26 June 2023, Mathisen moved on a free transfer to 2. Bundesliga club Wehen Wiesbaden.

=== Magdeburg ===
On 26 June 2024, Mathisen joined 1. FC Magdeburg in 2. Bundesliga.

=== St. Pauli ===
On 26 June 2026, Mathisen signed with St. Pauli.

== Career statistics ==
As of match played 30 August 2026

Appearances and goals by club, season and competition
Club	Season	League			Cup		Other		Total	
Club	Season	Division	Apps	Goals	Apps	Goals	Apps	Goals	Apps	Goals
Copenhagen	2014–15	Danish Superliga	1	0	—		2 (Note: Appearances in European play-offs)	0	3	0
Copenhagen	2015–16	Danish Superliga	3	0	—		—		3	0
Copenhagen	Total		4	0	—		2	0	6	0
Halmstads BK	2016	Superettan	12	2	—		—		14	2
Halmstads BK	2017	Superettan	28	2	3	2	—		31	4
Halmstads BK	2018	Superettan	27	4	2	0	—		29	4
Halmstads BK	Total		67	6	5	2	—		72	8
Falkenbergs FF	2019	Allsvenskan	18	1	1	0	—		19	1
Falkenbergs FF	2020	Allsvenskan	25	2	3	0	—		28	2
Falkenbergs FF	2021	Allsvenskan	0	0	3	2	—		3	2
Falkenbergs FF	Total		43	3	7	2	—		50	5
IK Sirius	2021	Allsvenskan	27	2	3	1	—		30	3
IK Sirius	2022	Allsvenskan	25	3	3	0	—		28	3
IK Sirius	2023	Allsvenskan	12	1	3	2	—		15	3
IK Sirius	Total		64	6	9	2	—		73	8
SV Wehen Wiesbaden	2023–24	2. Bundesliga	33	0	1	0	—		34	0
1. FC Magdeburg	2024–25	2. Bundesliga	30	3	1	0	—		31	3
1. FC Magdeburg	2025–26	2. Bundesliga	33	0	2	1	—		35	1
1. FC Magdeburg	Total		63	3	3	1	—		66	4
FC St. Pauli	2026–27	2. Bundesliga	3	1	1	0	—		4	1
Career total			277	21	26	8	2	0	305	29

== Honours ==
Copenhagen

- Danish Superliga: 2015–16
- Danish Cup: 2014–15, 2015–16
