= Lasse Fosgaard =

Danish footballer (born 1986)

Personal information
- Date of birth: 6 September 1986 (age 40)
- Place of birth: Rødovre, Denmark
- Height: 1.81 m (5 ft 11 in)
- Positions: Winger; right-back

Youth career
- Avarta

Senior career*
Years	Team	Apps	(Gls)
2008–2010	Avarta	?	(13)
2010–2012	Brønshøj	61	(11)
2012–2022	Lyngby	291	(18)
2022–2024	Avarta		
- * Club domestic league appearances and goals

Lasse Fosgaard (Danish pronunciation: [ˈfʌsˌkɒˀ]; born 6 September 1986) is a Danish former professional footballer.

== Career ==
=== Avarta and Brønshøj ===
Fosgaard came through the ranks of Avarta before being promoted to the first team, as the club competed in the Danish third tier. After receiving interest from clubs in the Danish Superliga, he moved to Brønshøj BK on 2 August 2010, a club that had recently been promoted to the Danish second tier. He scored his first goal for his new club on 15 August, in a 3–1 away loss to AGF. In general, Fosgaard had a strong start at Brønshøj, with the club in 4th place of the second tier before the winter break. After another strong display during the spring, the club ended in 5th place. Fosgaard scored four goals in his first season for Brønshøj.

The following season, Brønshøj struggled against relegation. Despite this, Fosgaard was one of the bright spots, scoring 7 goals as Brønshøj ended in eighth place, two points clear of relegation.

=== Lyngby ===
On 31 August 2012, Fosgaard signed a three-year contract with Lyngby Boldklub, who had ended in fourth place of the second tier the season before. Upon signing, Lyngby head coach Niels Frederiksen praised Fosgaard as a "hard worker" and a "strong finisher". In Lyngby, Fosgaard grew out to become somewhat of a club legend, making more than 200 appearances and experiencing promotions, relegations, bronze medals and European football.

On 28 May 2022, Lyngby Boldklub announced that Fosgaard's expiring contract would not be extended, making him a free agent after the 2021–22 season. At that point, he had made 290 appearances for the club through 10 years, contributing with 18 goals and 45 assists.

=== Return to Avarta ===
In June 2022 it was confirmed, that Fosgaard had returned to his former club, Avarta. In May 2024, Fosgaard announced his retirement.

== Personal life ==
Fosgaard is the younger brother of Anders Fosgaard and Jesper Fosgaard. All three played together at Avarta. They are sons of Bo Fosgaard who had a prolific tenure as a player for KB and Hvidovre IF during the 1980s.
