= Frederik Bay =

Danish footballer (born 1997)

Personal information
- Date of birth: 6 August 1997 (age 29)
- Place of birth: Denmark
- Height: 1.77 m (5 ft 10 in)
- Position: Left-back

Youth career
- Copenhagen

Senior career*
Years	Team	Apps	(Gls)
2016–2017	Copenhagen	0	(0)
2017	→ Helsingør (loan)	14	(1)
2017–2022	Helsingør	87	(3)
2022–2023	HB Køge	9	(0)

International career
2014–2015	Denmark U18	2	(0)
2016	Denmark U18	3	(0)
- * Club domestic league appearances and goals as of 17 June 2023

Frederik Bay (born 6 August 1997) is a Danish footballer. (Note: Frederik Bay at Soccerway (archived))

== Club career ==
Bay was part of the FC Copenhagen "School of Excellence" academy and has played a number of matches the club's youth team and reserve team. In August 2016, he was included in Copenhagen's first team squad. He made his official debut for their first team in a Danish Cup match on 26 October 2016 against Jammerbugt, where Bay played for one half.

On 31 January 2017, on the last day of the transfer window, it was announced that Bay moved to Helsingør in the second-tier Danish 1st Division on a six-month loan, where his contract with Copenhagen would also expire. After the expiry of his contract with Copenhagen, Bay joined FC Helsingør on a permanent contract.

After five years and 128 total games for Helsingør, it was confirmed on 29 June 2022, that Bay had joined fellow league club HB Køge.

== International career ==
Bay has gained five caps in total for Denmark U18 and Denmark U19, respectively.
