= Julian Kristoffersen =

Norwegian footballer (born 1997)

Personal information
- Date of birth: 10 May 1997 (age 29)
- Place of birth: Horten, Norway
- Height: 1.98 m (6 ft 6 in)
- Position: Forward

Youth career
- Ørn-Horten
- 2013–2015: FC Copenhagen

Senior career*
Years	Team	Apps	(Gls)
2015–2017	FC Copenhagen	2	(0)
2017–2018	Djurgården	3	(0)
2018–2020	Hobro IK	48	(6)
2020–2021	Jeonnam Dragons	24	(5)
2021–2023	Salernitana	8	(0)
2021–2022	→ Cosenza (loan)	5	(0)
2023	→ Virtus Verona (loan)	9	(3)
2023	Ancona	11	(0)
2024	Pro Sesto	6	(0)
2024	Jedinstvo Ub	6	(0)
2025	Lecco	8	(0)

International career
- Norway U16
- Norway U17
- Norway U18
- Norway U21
- * Club domestic league appearances and goals as of 25 April 2025

Julian Kristoffersen (born 10 May 1997) is a Norwegian professional footballer who plays as a forward.

== Club career ==
Born in Horten, Kristoffersen began his career in Norway with Ørn-Horten, before signing with Danish club FC Copenhagen in 2013.

He signed a three-year contract with Swedish club Djurgården in August 2017. He returned to Denmark in June 2018, signing a three-year contract with Hobro.

On 8 March 2020, Hobro confirmed that they had sold Kristoffersen to South Korean club Jeonnam Dragons.

On 2 February 2021, he signed a three-and-a-half-year contract with Italian Serie B club Salernitana.

For the 2021–22 season, Salernitana was promoted to Serie A and Kristoffersen made one appearance in the top tier, before he joined Cosenza in Serie B on a season-long loan on 31 August 2021.

On 19 January 2023, Kristoffersen was loaned to Virtus Verona in Serie C for the rest of the season.

On 29 August 2023, Kristoffersen signed a one-season contract with Serie C club Ancona. On 11 January 2024, he moved to another Serie C club Pro Sesto.

On 10 February 2025, Krisoffersen returned to Italy and signed with Lecco until the end of the 2024–25 season.

== International career ==
Kristoffersen has represented Norway at youth international levels, at under-16, under-17, under-18 and under-21 levels.

== Career statistics ==
=== Club ===
As of match played 10 May 2021

Appearances and goals by club, season and competition
Club	Season	League			National cup		Continental		Total	
Club	Season	Division	Apps	Goals	Apps	Goals	Apps	Goals	Apps	Goals
Copenhagen	2015–16	Danish Superliga	2	0	0	0	–		2	0
Copenhagen	2016–17	Danish Superliga	0	0	1	1	–		1	1
Copenhagen	Total		2	0	1	1	0	0	3	1
Djurgården	2017	Allsvenskan	3	0	1	1	–		4	1
Djurgården	2018	Allsvenskan	0	0	0	0	–		0	0
Djurgården	Total		3	0	1	1	0	0	4	1
Hobro	2018–19	Danish Superliga	27	4	0	0	–		27	4
Hobro	2019–20	Danish Superliga	21	2	0	0	–		25	0
Hobro	Total		48	6	0	0	0	0	48	6
Jeonnam Dragons	2020	K League 2	24	5	1	0	–		25	5
Salernitana	2020–21	Serie B	6	0	0	0	–		6	0
Career total			83	11	3	2	0	0	86	13
