= Jakob Kehlet =

Danish football referee

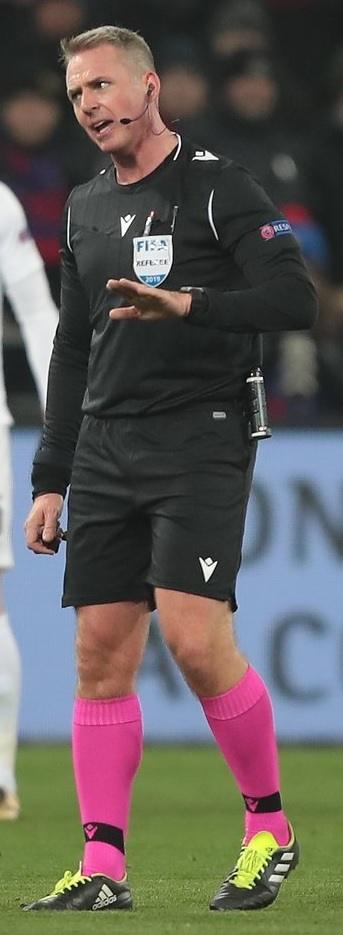
- Kehlet in 2019
- Born: 5 September 1980 (age 46)

Domestic
Years	League	Role

International
Years	League	Role
2011–	FIFA listed	Referee

Jakob Kehlet (born 5 September 1980) is a Danish professional football referee. He has been a full international for FIFA since 2011.
