= Youssef Toutouh =

Danish footballer (born 1992)

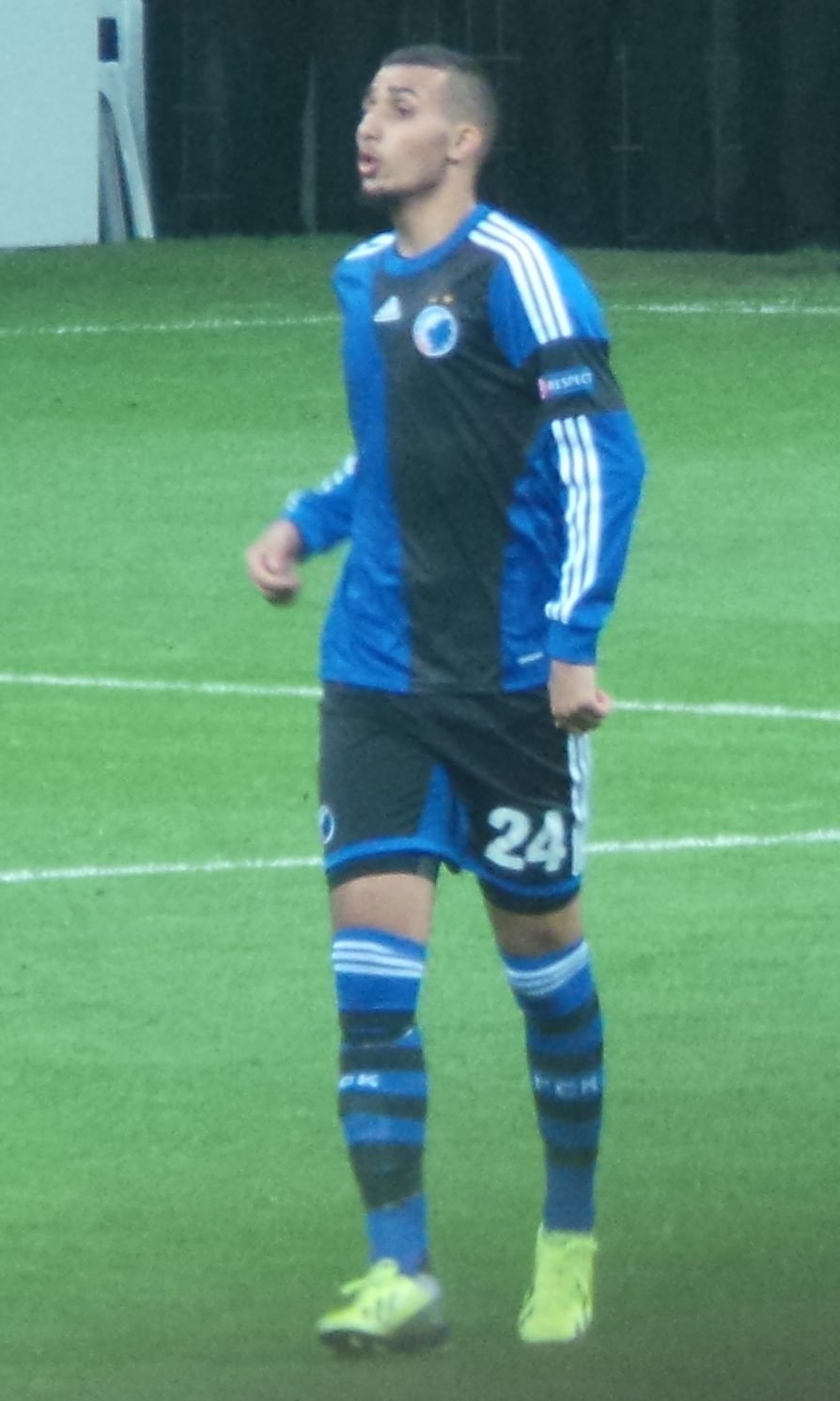
- Toutouh with FC Copenhagen in 2013

Personal information
- Full name: Youssef Toutouh
- Date of birth: 6 October 1992 (age 34)
- Place of birth: Nørrebro, Denmark
- Height: 1.93 m (6 ft 4 in)
- Position: Left midfielder

Team information
- Current team: B.93 (U14 manager)

Youth career
- –2008: B.93
- 2008–2010: Hvidovre

Senior career*
Years	Team	Apps	(Gls)
2010–2011	Hvidovre	14	(3)
2011–2018	Copenhagen	106	(14)
2012–2013	→ Esbjerg fB (loan)	23	(2)
2018–2020	AGF	15	(1)
2019	→ Stabæk (loan)	7	(0)
2020	FAR Rabat	7	(0)
2020–2021	Botoșani	14	(0)
2022	Nykøbing	1	(0)
2023	Brønshøj	3	(0)
2024	Brønshøj	3	(0)

International career
2012	Denmark U20	1	(0)
2013–2014	Denmark U21	12	(0)

Managerial career
- 2023–2024: B.93 (U19 assistant)
- 2025–: B.93 (U14 manager)
- * Club domestic league appearances and goals

Youssef Toutouh (born 6 October 1992) is a Danish retired professional footballer who played as an attacking midfielder, and current manager of B.93's U14 team.

== Club career ==
=== Hvidovre ===
After playing two years for the youth teams, Toutouh was promoted to the first team squad in the summer 2010 after some good seasons at the U19 squad. At the age of only 18, Totouh managed to become a regular first team player and got his debut on 2 October 2010 against FC Roskilde in the Danish 1st Division. He scored his first goal against Vendsyssel FF in January 2011.

=== FC Copenhagen ===
After a good season on the first team, Toutouh got many interested clubs behind him, for example F.C. Copenhagen, who invited him to a one-week trial. The trial was extended for a further week. After two weeks of trail and one friendly game played, F.C. Copenhagen signed Toutouh on a three-year contract and took with the team on training camp in Austria. The FC Copenhagen management was very impressed by Toutouh and also said to the medias, that it was very rare, that a trial turned out with a contract. Toutouh was seen as one of the biggest talents in the country at this time.

==== Loan to Esbjerg fB ====
Due to the lack of playing time (he played four games in his first season), Toutouh and F.C. Copenhagen decided to loan out the player to Esbjerg fB on 3 September 2012 until the new year. Toutouh did very well and played 10 games from start. So Copenhagen and Toutouh decided to extend the loan deal for the rest of the season.

In April 2013, Toutouh made a stunner against Randers FC, which he got very popular for.

==== Back to F.C. Copenhagen ====
After a good season at Esbjerg fB, Toutouh revealed, that he didn't know where he was going to play. That made F.C. Copenhagen to go out to the medias and confirm, that they still believed in him. He stayed in Copenhagen and began to play regularly, before he got an injury in March 2014, and was ruled out for the rest of the season. The same happened a year later, where he went under the knife for a knee-injury.

In January 2016, Toutouh extended his contract until 2019. After F.C. Copenhagen won the 2016–17 Danish Superliga, Toutouh was given two games quarantine for holding a roman candle during the team's celebration of the league title. Some days later, some uproar took place between manager Ståle Solbakken and Toutouh. Toutouh revealed, that he wanted to move on and play at a higher level, but Solbakken was not down with that idea. Solbakken went out to the medias and criticized Toutouh for that behavior, and said, that he was going nowhere due to the lack of players on the winger-position. Toutouh was injured in the first half of the 2017–18 season. Solbakken revealed in November 2017, that Toutouh should have been sold, because he had refused a contract extension.

=== AGF ===
After his contract with F.C. Copenhagen expired, Toutouh signed for AGF on 4 October 2018.

=== FAR Rabat ===
A few days after being released by AGF, Toutouh signed a 1,5-year contract with Moroccan club FAR Rabat on 16 January 2020. He made seven appearances for the club.

=== Botoșani ===
On 22 October 2020, Toutouh signed a two-year contract with Romanian Liga I club Botoșani. He left the club in June 2021, after only one season with the club where he made 14 appearances.

=== Nykøbing ===
After keeping his form in Nykøbing FC since the spring of 2022, the club confirmed on 7 September 2022 that they had signed Toutouh on a short deal until the end of the year, marking his first return to club football in more than a year. He made his Nykøbing debut on 18 October, replacing Ahmed Hassan in the 89th minute in a 2–1 away win over Næsby at ALPI Arena Næsby. He made his first league appearance for the club on 22 October, again coming on as a late substitute in a loss against Fremad Amager. In December 2022, the club announced Toutouh's departure.

=== Later career ===
In March 2023, Toutouh signed with Denmark Series side Brønshøj Boldklub. After a spring in Brønshøj, Toutouh ended his career and was instead employed by his former club, B.93, where he was to act as assistant coach for the club's U-19 team.

In the summer of 2024, however, Toutouh attempted a comeback and started training with B.93's first team squad himself. He was never offered a contract, but managed to be on the bench in a single Danish Cup match.

He finally hung up his boots shortly before the New Year, and started as U14 manager at the club after the turn of 2025.

== International career ==
In January 2016, Toutouh announced that he had decided to represent the Moroccan national team.

== Honours ==
Copenhagen

- Danish Superliga: 2015–16, 2016–17
- Danish Cup: 2011–12, 2014–15, 2015–16, 2016–17

Esbjerg fB

- Danish Cup: 2012–13
