= 2017–18 F.C. Copenhagen season =

F.C. Copenhagen
2017–18 season
- Chairman: Bo Rygaard
- Manager: (Norway) Ståle Solbakken
- Stadium: Telia Parken
- Superliga: Fourth Place
- Danish Cup: Fourth Round
- UEFA Champions League: Playoff Round
- UEFA Europa League: Round of 32
- Top goalscorer: League: Pieros Sotiriou 14; All: Pieros Sotiriou 16
- Highest home attendance: 34,912 vs Atlético (Europa League, 15 February 2018)
- Lowest home attendance: 7,809 vs. Hobro IK (Danish Superliga, 29 July 2017)
- Average home league attendance: 13,624; 245,239 fans, 18 home matches
- Biggest win: 5–1 vs. Lyngby BK and vs. Randers FC (Superliga, 26 November 2017 and 10 February 2018)
- Biggest defeat: 1–4 vs. Atlético Madrid (Europa League, 15 February 2018)
Home colours	Away colours	Third colours

The 2017–18 FC Copenhagen season was F.C. Copenhagen's 26th season of existence, competing each year in the Danish Superliga, the top tier of football in Denmark. Outside of the Superliga, Copenhagen competed in the Danish Cup and the UEFA Champions League qualifying rounds.

F.C. Copenhagen had its worst season since the 1999-2000 campaign, finishing fourth in the 2017-18 Danish Superliga and being eliminated in the fourth round of the 2017-18 Danish Cup.

The Lions fared better in the 2017-18 UEFA Champions League, advancing to the playoff round by defeating MŠK Žilina in the second qualifying round and FK Vardar in the third qualifying round, before seeing their Champions League season end with a loss to Qarabağ FK.

The playoff loss qualified the team for the 2017-18 UEFA Europa League Group Stage. Copenhagen finished second in Group F and qualified for the round of 32, where Atlético Madrid prevailed, 5–1.

== Kits ==
Home (Playoffs)	Home (League)	Away	Third

== Squad ==
As of 25 May 2018

No.	Name	Nationality	Position	Since	Date of birth	Signed from
Goalkeepers
1	Stephan Andersen	(Denmark)	GK	2014	26 November 1981	(Spain) Real Betis
21	László Köteles	(Hungary)	GK	2018	1 September, 1984	(Belgium) KRC Genk
25	Robin Olsen	(Sweden)	GK	2018	8 January 1990	(Greece) PAOK FC
41	Kim Christensen	(Denmark)	GK	2010	16 July 1979	(Sweden) IFK Göteborg
Defenders
2	Tom Høgli	(Norway)	DF	2014	20 February 1984	(Belgium) Club Brugge
3	Pierre Bengtsson	(Sweden)	DF	2017	12 April 1988	(Germany) 1. FSV Mainz 05
5	Erik Johansson	(Sweden)	DF	2016	30 December 1988	(Belgium) KAA Gent
15	Mikael Antonsson	(Sweden)	DF	2014	31 May 1981	(Italy) Bologna F.C. 1909
18	Mads Roerslev	(Denmark)	DF	2016	24 June 1999	Homegrown
19	Denis Vavro	(Slovakia)	DF	2017	10 April 1996	(Slovakia) MŠK Žilina
20	Nicolai Boilesen	(Denmark)	DF	2016	16 February 1992	(Netherlands) AFC Ajax
22	Peter Ankersen	(Denmark)	DF	2016	22 September 1990	(Austria) FC Red Bull Salzburg
27	Michael Lüftner	(Czech Republic)	DF	2016	14 March 1994	(Czech Republic) SK Slavia Prague
Midfielders
6	William Kvist	(Denmark)	MF	2015	24 February 1985	(England) Wigan Athletic F.C.
7	Viktor Fischer	(Denmark)	MF	2018	9 June 1994	(Germany) 1. FSV Mainz 05
7	Benjamin Verbič	(Slovenia)	MF	2015	27 November 1993	(Slovenia) NK Celje
8	Uroš Matić	(Serbia)	MF	2017	23 May 1990	(Austria) SK Sturm Graz
10	Zeca	(Greece) (Portugal)	MF	2017	31 Aug 1988	(Greece) Panathinaikos F.C.
14	Nicolaj Thomsen	(Denmark)	MF	2017	8 May 1993	(France) FC Nantes
16	Ján Greguš	(Slovakia)	MF	2016	29 January 1991	(Czech Republic) FK Jablonec
17	Kasper Kusk	(Denmark)	MF	2015	10 November 1991	(Netherlands) FC Twente
24	Youssef Toutouh	(Denmark)	MF	2011	6 October 1992	(Denmark) Hvidovre IF
29	Robert Skov	(Denmark)	MF	2018	20 May 1996	(Denmark) Silkeborg IF
32	Danny Amankwaa	(Denmark)	MF	2012	30 January 1994	Homegrown
33	Rasmus Falk	(Denmark)	MF	2016	15 January 1992	(Denmark) OB
Forwards
9	Federico Santander	(Paraguay)	FW	2015	4 June 1991	(Paraguay) Club Guaraní
11	Andrija Pavlović	(Serbia)	FW	2016	16 November 1993	(Serbia) FK Čukarički
23	Martin Pušić	(Austria) (Croatia)	FW	2017	24 October 1987	(Denmark) FC Midtjylland
23	Jonas Wind	(Denmark)	FW	2016	7 February 1999	Homegrown
28	Pieros Sotiriou	(Cyprus)	FW	2017	13 January 1993	(Cyprus) APOEL FC
40	Carlo Holse	(Denmark)	FW	2016	2 June 1999	Homegrown

== Transfers and loans ==
=== Arrivals ===
==== Summer ====
Position	Player	Transferred from	Date
MF	(Cyprus) Pieros Sotiriou	APOEL FC	July 1, 2017
DF	(Czech Republic) Michael Lüftner	SK Slavia Prague	July 1, 2017
DF	(Sweden) Pierre Bengtsson	1. FSV Mainz 05	July 1, 2017
DF	(Denmark) Mads Roerslev	F.C. Copenhagen U19	July 1, 2017
FW	(Denmark) Carlo Holse	F.C. Copenhagen U19	August 24, 2017
FW	(Austria) Martin Pušić	AC Horsens	August 26, 2017
DF	(Slovakia) Denis Vavro	MŠK Žilina	August 26, 2017
MF	(Greece) (Portugal) Zeca	Panathinaikos F.C.	August 28, 2017

==== Winter ====
Position	Player	Transferred from	Date
MF	(Denmark) Robert Skov	Silkeborg IF	January 19, 2018
MF	(Denmark) Viktor Fischer	1. FSV Mainz 05	January 31, 2018
FW	(Denmark) Jonas Wind	F.C. Copenhagen U19	February 7, 2018
GK	(Hungary) László Köteles	KRC Genk	March 5, 2018

=== Departures ===
==== Summer ====
Position	Player	Transferred to	Date
DF	(Sweden) Ludwig Augustinsson	SV Werder Bremen	July 1, 2017
FW	(Denmark) Andreas Cornelius	Atalanta B.C.	July 1, 2017
DF	(Denmark) Frederik Bay	FC Helsingør	July 1, 2017
DF	(Denmark) (The Gambia) Zanka	Huddersfield Town A.F.C.	July 7, 2017
DF	(Denmark) (Ivory Coast) Jores Okore	Aalborg BK	July 7, 2017
FW	(Norway) Julian Kristoffersen	Djurgårdens IF	August 8, 2017

==== Winter ====
Position	Player	Transferred to	Date
FW	(Slovenia) Benjamin Verbič	FC Dynamo Kyiv	January 4, 2018
DF	(Norway) Tom Høgli	Tromsø IL	January 12, 2018
MF	(Denmark) (Ghana) Danny Amankwaa	Heart of Midlothian F.C.	January 25, 2018
FW	(Denmark) Kasper Kusk	Aalborg BK	January 31, 2018
FW	(Austria) (Croatia) Martin Pušić	AGF	February 1, 2018

=== Loan in ===
Position	Player	Loaned from	End
DF	(Denmark) Frederik Bay	FC Helsingør	June 30, 2017
FW	(Denmark) (North Macedonia) Bashkim Kadrii	Minnesota United FC	August 30, 2017
MF	(Ivory Coast) Aboubakar Keita	Halmstads BK	December 1, 2017

=== Loan out ===
Position	Player	Loaned from	End
FW	(Denmark) (North Macedonia) Bashkim Kadrii	Randers FC	August 31, 2017

== Non-competitive ==
=== Pre-season Friendlies ===
29 June 2017	(Serbia) FK Partizan	3–2	(Denmark) F.C. Copenhagen	(Slovenia) Domžale
16:00	Jovanović 14', 50'; Pantić 77'	Report	Kvist 23'; Verbič 70'	Stadium: Domžale Sports Park; Attendance: 1,000; Referee: Miran Bukovec

2 July 2017	(Austria) SK Sturm Graz	1–1	(Denmark) F.C. Copenhagen	(Austria) Großklein
17:00	Høgli 54' (o.g.)	FCK Summary	Verbič 10'	Stadium: Stadion Großklein; Attendance: 1,500; Referee: (Austria) Andreas Kollegger

5 July 2017	(Denmark) F.C. Copenhagen	0–0	(Russia) FC Krasnodar	(Austria) Ilz, Styria
16:00		Report		Stadium: Sportarena Ilz; Attendance: 1,000; Referee: Alexander Harkam

=== Mid-season Friendlies ===
18 January 2018	(Denmark) F.C. Copenhagen	4–0	(Denmark) Vejle	(Denmark) Copenhagen
13:15	Wind 8', 16'; Pavlović 37'; Santander 57' (yellow card) 70'	Report		Stadium: Telia Parken; Attendance: 567; Referee: Yasin Seker

22 January 2018	(Russia) FC Zenit Saint Petersburg	5–0	(Denmark) F.C. Copenhagen	(United Arab Emirates) Dubai
16:00	Panyukov 17', 33'; Zabolotny 27'; Kranevitter 62'; Alexander Kokorin 87'	Report		Stadium: Maktoum bin Rashid Al Maktoum Stadium; Attendance: 50; Referee: Gavin Taylor

25 January 2018	(China) Guangzhou Evergrande Taobao F.C.	0–0	(Denmark) F.C. Copenhagen	(United Arab Emirates) Dubai
12:30		Report	Greguš (yellow card) 78'; Kvist (yellow card) 88'	Stadium: Maktoum bin Rashid Al Maktoum Stadium; Referee: Ali Hassan Kareem

30 January 2018	(Ukraine) FC Shakhtar Donetsk	1–2	(Denmark) F.C. Copenhagen	(United Arab Emirates) Dubai
13:00	Taison 57'	Report	Boilesen (yellow card) 35'; Skov 45+2'; Ankersen (yellow card) 48'	Stadium: Maktoum bin Rashid Al Maktoum Stadium; Referee: Mohamed Salem Yusef

== Competitive ==
=== Competition record ===
Competition	Record							
Competition	G	W	D	L	GF	GA	GD	Win %
Superliga	37	18	7	12	69	48	+21	48.65
Champions League	6	3	0	3	10	7	+3	50.00
Europa League	8	2	3	3	8	8	+0	25.00
Sydbank Pokalen	2	1	0	1	3	3	+0	50.00
Total	53	24	10	19	90	66	+24	45.28

Last updated: 25 May 2018.
Source: Competitive matches

=== Danish Superliga ===
==== Regular season ====
Pos	Team	Pld	W	D	L	GF	GA	GD	Pts	Qualification
2	Midtjylland	26	19	3	4	60	29	+31	60	Qualification for the Championship round
3	Nordsjælland	26	15	5	6	62	41	+21	50	Qualification for the Championship round
4	Copenhagen	26	13	5	8	50	33	+17	44	Qualification for the Championship round
5	Aalborg	26	8	12	6	28	27	+1	36	Qualification for the Championship round
6	Horsens	26	7	14	5	32	34	−2	35	Qualification for the Championship round

Source: Danish Football Association (in Danish), Soccerway
Rules for classification: 1) Points; 2) Goal difference; 3) Goals scored; 4) Away goals scored; 5) Play-off (played on neutral ground if determining teams for different rounds); 6) Draw.

===== Matches =====
15 July 2017 Round 1	F.C. Copenhagen	1–1	AaB	Copenhagen
16:00	Santander 39'; Kvist (yellow card) 44'; Verbič (yellow card) 44'	FCK Summary	Christensen (yellow card) 32'; Risgård (yellow card) 44'; Würtz (yellow card) 77'; Blåbjerg 90+4'	Stadium: Telia Parken; Attendance: 11,006; Referee: Jorgen Daugbjerg Burchardt

22 July 2017 Round 2	Randers FC	0–3	F.C. Copenhagen	Randers
16:00	Bager (yellow card) 85'	FCK Summary	Sotiriou 9', 90+2'; Greguš (yellow card) 34'; Pavlović 62'; Matić (yellow card) 73'	Stadium: BioNutria Park; Attendance: 4,227; Referee: Anders Poulsen

29 July 2017 Round 3	F.C. Copenhagen	0–0	Hobro IK	Copenhagen
18:00	Sotiriou (yellow card) 19'; Lüftner (yellow card) 42'	FCK Summary	Bøge (yellow card) 90'; Babayan (yellow card) 90'	Stadium: Telia Parken; Attendance: 7,809; Referee: Jens Grabski Maae

6 August 2017 Round 4	Brøndby IF	1–0	F.C. Copenhagen	Brøndby
18:00	Larsson (yellow card) 44'; Halimi (yellow card) 44'; Tibbling 90'	FCK Summary	Johansson (yellow card) 24'; Kvist (yellow card) 44'; Verbič (yellow card) 45+2'; Robin Olsen (yellow card) 45'	Stadium: Brøndby Stadion; Attendance: 21,169; Referee: Anders Poulsen

12 August 2017 Round 5	F.C. Copenhagen	1–1	AC Horsens	Copenhagen
18:30	Santander 77'; Bengtsson (yellow card) 89'	FCK Summary	Sanneh 31'; Mehl (yellow card) 74'; Finnbogason (yellow card) 82'; Tshiembe (yellow card) 83'	Stadium: Telia Parken; Attendance: 7,918; Referee: Michael Tykgaard

19 August 2017 Round 6	F.C. Copenhagen	3–2	SønderjyskE	Copenhagen
18:00	Santander (yellow card) 15'; Kusk 27'; Kvist (yellow card) 56'; Verbič 81'; Pavlović 84' (yellow card) 85'	FCK Summary	Luijckx (yellow card) 28'; Zimling (yellow card) 49'; Jakobsen 59'; Uhre 62'	Stadium: Telia Parken; Attendance: 7,953; Referee: Anders Poulsen

27 August 2017 Round 7	FC Nordsjælland	3–0	F.C. Copenhagen	Farum
18:00	Donyoh 27'; Marcondes 36'; Pedersen (yellow card) 41'; Andersen (yellow card) 66'; Tranberg (yellow card) 81'; Asante 83'	FCK Summary	Ankersen (red card) 56'; Sotiriou (yellow card) 69'; Verbič (yellow card) 81'; Falk (yellow card) 81'	Stadium: Right to Dream Park; Attendance: 7,142; Referee: Michael Tykgaard

10 September 2017 Round 8	F.C. Copenhagen	4–3	FC Midtjylland	Copenhagen
16:00	Sotiriou 8' (yellow card) 59'; Verbič 15', 60'; Kvist (yellow card) 38'; Pavlović (yellow card) 61'; Zeca 63' (yellow card) 68'; Denis Vavro (yellow card) 73'	FCK Summary	Novák 26'; Kristensen 29'; Drachmann (yellow card) 59'; Sparv (yellow card) 71'	Stadium: Telia Parken; Attendance: 19,308; Referee: Mads-Kristoffer Kristoffersen

17 September 2017 Round 9	FC Helsingør	0–4	F.C. Copenhagen	Helsingør
19:00	Mortensen (yellow card) 72'; Henriksen (yellow card) 75'	FCK Summary	Sotiriou 7', 83'; Pavlović 18', 33'; Kvist (yellow card) 18'; Verbič (yellow card) 58'	Stadium: Helsingør Stadion; Attendance: 5,308; Referee: Peter Kjærsgaard

23 September 2017 Round 10	F.C. Copenhagen	4–0	Silkeborg IF	Copenhagen
18:00	Verbič 22', 28'; Lüftner (yellow card) 36'; Peter Ankersen (yellow card) 39'; Pavlović 49'	FCK Summary	Moro (yellow card) 52'	Stadium: Telia Parken; Attendance: 14,403; Referee: Jakob Kehlet

1 October 2017 Round 11	Lyngby BK	3–1	F.C. Copenhagen	Lyngby
18:00	Hebo 20'; George 30', 85'; Christjansen (yellow card) 50'	FCK Summary	Greguš (yellow card) 45+1'; Sotiriou 46'; Peter Ankersen (yellow card) 65'	Stadium: Lyngby Stadion; Attendance: 4,445; Referee: Anders Poulsen

15 October 2017 Round 12	OB	1–0	F.C. Copenhagen	Odense
18:00	Jacobsen 1'; Petersen (yellow card) 61'	FCK Summary		Stadium: EWII Park; Attendance: 9,231; Referee: Michael Tykgaard

22 October 2017 Round 13	F.C. Copenhagen	4–0	AGF	Copenhagen
18:00	Matić 34'; Sotiriou (yellow card) 13' (goal) 72'; Verbič 44', 65'	FCK Summary	Spelmann (yellow card) 13'; Junker (yellow card) 18'; Amini (yellow card) 29'	Stadium: Telia Parken; Attendance: 17,481; Referee: Michael Johansen

29 October 2017 Round 14	AC Horsens	1–1	F.C. Copenhagen	Horsens
16:00	Thorsen (yellow card) 37'; Okosun 63'; Thychosen (yellow card) 69'; Qvist (yellow card) 84'; Sanneh (yellow card) 85'	FCK Summary	Kvist (yellow card) 6'; Verbič (red card) 37'; Lüftner (yellow card) 68'; Bengtsson 77'	Stadium: CASA Arena; Attendance: 4,751; Referee: Peter Kjærsgaard

5 November 2017 Round 15	F.C. Copenhagen	0–1	Brøndby IF	Copenhagen
12:00	Bengtsson (yellow card) 41'; Falk (yellow card) 55'; Kvist (yellow card) 72'	FCK Summary	Tibbling (yellow card) 39'; Nørgaard 42' (yellow card) 52'; Muhktar (yellow card) 45'; Fisker (yellow card) 70'	Stadium: Telia Parken; Attendance: 24,446; Referee: Mads-Kristoffer Kristoffersen

19 November 2017 Round 16	SønderjyskE	3–0	F.C. Copenhagen	Haderslev
16:00	Jakobsen 2'; Pedersen 28' (yellow card) 31'; Gartenmann (yellow card) 52'; Poulsen (yellow card) 60'; Zimling (yellow card) 84'; Kløve 88'	FCK Summary	Kvist (yellow card) 25'; Sotiriou (yellow card) 31'	Stadium: Sydbank Park; Attendance: 6,337; Referee: Jakob Kehlet

26 November 2017 Round 17	F.C. Copenhagen	5–1	Lyngby BK	Copenhagen
16:00	Vavro (yellow card) 58'; Pavlović 64', 75'; Sørensen 66' (o.g.); Boilesen 90+2'; Matić 90+4'	FCK Summary	George 61'; Sørensen (yellow card) 65'; Lumb (yellow card) 73'; Brandrup (yellow card) 77'	Stadium: Telia Parken; Attendance: 16,678; Referee: Morten Krogh

3 December 2017 Round 18	F.C. Copenhagen	1–3	FC Nordsjælland	Copenhagen
18:00	Sotiriou 44' (pen.); Zeca (yellow card) 86'	FCK Summary	Bartolec 36' (yellow card) 45+1'; Marcondes 38'; Hansen (yellow card) 60'; Mtiliga (yellow card) 63'; Pedersen 72'	Stadium: Telia Parken; Attendance: 14,952; Referee: Michael Johansen

10 December 2017 Round 19	AaB	1–1	F.C. Copenhagen	Aalborg
16:00	Lesniak 2'	FCK Summary	Santander 33'; Verbič (yellow card) 79'	Stadium: Aalborg Portland Park; Attendance: 6,835; Referee: Jorgen Daugbjerg Burchardt

10 February 2019 Round 20	F.C. Copenhagen	5–1	Randers FC	Copenhagen
18:00	Sotiriou 44', 38'; Fischer 31'; Agesen 33' (o.g.); Zeca 71'; Greguš (yellow card) 79'	FCK Summary	Poulsen (yellow card) 31' (goal) 45'	Stadium: Telia Parken; Attendance: 8,859; Referee: Mads-Kristoffer Kristoffersen

18 February 2018 Round 21	FC Midtjylland	3–1	F.C. Copenhagen	Herning
16:00	Onykea 28'; Sviatchenko (yellow card) 39'; Duelund 44'; Hende 88'	FCK Summary	Sotiriou 23' (yellow card) 39'; Olsen (yellow card) 45+2'; Ankersen (yellow card) 87'	Stadium: MCH Arena; Attendance: 10,654; Referee: Anders Poulsen

25 February 2018 Round 22	F.C. Copenhagen	1–0	OB	Copenhagen
18:00	Skov (yellow card) 25' (goal) 61'; Boilesen (yellow card) 71'; Santander (yellow card) 86'	FCK Summary		Stadium: Telia Parken; Attendance: 9,903; Referee: Jakob Kehlet

28 February 2018 Round 23	Hobro IK	0–2	F.C. Copenhagen	Hobro
20:00	Grønning (yellow card) 82'; Amankwah (yellow card) 85'	FCK Summary	Fischer 25'; Falk 28'	Stadium: DS Arena; Attendance: 1,013; Referee: Jørgen Daugbjerg Burchardt

4 March 2018 Round 24	AGF	0–1	F.C. Copenhagen	Aarhus
16:00		FCK Summary	Fischer (yellow card) 64'; Santander 83'; Ankersen (yellow card) 87'	Stadium: Ceres Park; Attendance: 8,787; Referee: Peter Kjærsgaard

12 March 2018 Round 25	F.C. Copenhagen	4–3	FC Helsingør	Copenhagen
19:00	Gregor 14' (o.g.); Sotiriou 38'; Fischer 42' (yellow card) 90'; Zeca (yellow card) 64'; Santander 90+2'	FCK Summary	Mortensen 31', 66'; Mohammad 59'; Jørgensen (yellow card) 77'	Stadium: Telia Parken; Attendance: 7,954; Referee: Anders Poulsen

18 March 2018 Round 26	Silkeborg IF	1–3	F.C. Copenhagen	Silkeborg
17:00	Rodić 11'; Vatsadze (yellow card) 72'	FCK Summary	Lüftner 28'; Santander 43'; Kvist (yellow card) 78'; Sotiriou 82'	Stadium: JYSK Park; Attendance: 4,271; Referee: Mads-Kristoffer Kristoffersen

==== Championship round ====
Points and goals carried over in full from the regular season.

Pos	Team	Pld	W	D	L	GF	GA	GD	Pts	Qualification	MID	BRØ	NOR	COP	AAB	HOR
1	Midtjylland (C)	36	27	4	5	80	39	+41	85	Qualification for the Champions League second qualifying round	—	2–3	2–1	3–2	3–0	1–0
2	Brøndby	36	24	9	3	82	37	+45	81	Qualification for the Europa League third qualifying round (Note: The highest-ranked team not already qualified for a UEFA competition progressed to the playoff match. As Brøndby IF finished in second place and also won the 2017–18 Danish Cup, F.C. Copenhagen advanced to the play-off match by virtue of its fourth place finish.)	0–1	—	3–1	2–1	1–1	5–1
3	Nordsjælland	36	17	8	11	76	58	+18	59	Qualification for the Europa League first qualifying round	1–2	3–4	—	0–0	3–1	2–1
4	Copenhagen (O)	36	17	7	12	65	47	+18	58	Qualification for the European play-off match	0–2	1–1	2–1	—	2–1	4–1
5	Aalborg	36	10	15	11	38	44	−6	45		3–3	0–3	0–0	1–0	—	2–0
6	Horsens	36	8	16	12	43	57	−14	40		0–1	2–2	2–2	2–3	2–1	—

Source: Danish FA
(C) Champions; (O) Play-off winners

===== Matches =====
2 April 2018 Round 1	F.C. Copenhagen	2–1	FC Nordsjælland	Copenhagen
16:00	Falk 76'; Santander 90+4'	FCK Summary	Asante 37'; Damsgaard (yellow card) 78' (yellow-red card) 83'	Stadium: Telia Parken; Attendance: 12,542; Referee: Peter Kjærsgaard-Andersen

9 April 2018 Round 2	FC Midtjylland	3–2	F.C. Copenhagen	Herning
19:00	Hende (yellow card) 50'; Sparv 54' (yellow card) 90+1'; Sviatchenko 60'; Sanneh (yellow card) 65'; Hansen (yellow card) 90+3'	FCK Summary	Santander 12'; Fischer 50'	Stadium: MCH Arena; Attendance: 9,755; Referee: Jens Grabski Maae

15 April 2018 Round 3	Brøndby IF	2–1	F.C. Copenhagen	Brøndby
16:05	Arajuuri (yellow card) 19'; Rønnow (yellow card) 65'; Wilczek 76' (yellow card) 88'; Nørgaard (yellow card) 82'; Mukhtar 90'	FCK Summary	Ankersen 21'; Falk (yellow card) 43'; Andersen (yellow card) 63'	Stadium: Brøndby Stadium; Attendance: 25,335; Referee: Jakob Kehlet

18 April 2018 Round 4	F.C. Copenhagen	2–1	AaB	Copenhagen
20:00	Wind 12'; Fischer 68'; Kvist (yellow card) 86'	FCK Summary	Blåbjerg 33'; Børsting (yellow card) 63'; Abildgaard (yellow card) 81'	Stadium: Telia Parken; Attendance: 9,789; Referee: Anders Poulsen

21 April 2018 Round 5	F.C. Copenhagen	4–1	AC Horsens	Copenhagen
16:00	Vavro 6'; Fischer 20'; Wind 31'; Santander 84'	FCK Summary	Andersen (yellow card) 13'; Kortegaard (yellow card) 39'; Qvist (yellow card) 43'; Thorsen 59'	Stadium: Telia Parken; Attendance: 10,171; Referee: Michael Tykgaard

27 April 2018 Round 6	F.C. Copenhagen	2–3	AC Horsens	Horsens
19:00	Santander 16', 45+1'; Johansson 62'	FCK Summary	Ludwig 8'; Andersen (red card) 90+1'	Stadium: CASA Arena; Attendance: 3,433; Referee: Peter Munch Larsen

6 May 2018 Round 7	F.C. Copenhagen	1–1	Brøndby IF	Copenhagen
16:00	Sotiriou 43'	FCK Summary	Wilczek 2'; Tibbling (yellow card) 32'; Fisker (yellow card) 33'; Röcker (yellow card) 80'	Stadium: Telia Parken; Attendance: 28,410; Referee: Jens Grabski Maae

13 May 2018 Round 8	AaB	1–0	F.C. Copenhagen	Aalborg
20:00	Børsting (yellow card) 20'; Ahlmann (yellow card) 24'; Christensen (yellow card) 76'; Kusk 90+4'	FCK Summary	Johansson (yellow card) 3'; Fischer (yellow card) 25'; Santander (yellow card) 45'; Zeca (yellow card) 84'; Boilesen (yellow card) 90+5'	Stadium: Aalborg Portland Park; Attendance: 5,148; Referee: Michael Tykgaard

18 May 2018 Round 9	F.C. Copenhagen	0–2	FC Midtjylland	Copenhagen
18:00		FCK Summary	Onyeka 15'; Onuachu (yellow card) 50'; Wikheim 66'; Poulsen (yellow card) 88'; Drachmann (yellow card) 85'; Sparv (yellow card) 90+2'	Stadium: Telia Parken; Attendance: 17,167; Referee: Mads-Kristoffer Kristoffersen

21 May 2018 Round 10	FC Nordsjælland	0–0	F.C. Copenhagen	Farum
18:00	Jensen (yellow card) 56'	FCK Summary	Fischer (yellow card) 84'; Lüftner (yellow card) 90+2'	Stadium: Right to Dream Park; Attendance: 10,124; Referee: Jakob Kehlet

==== Europa League Playoff ====
25 May 2018 Final	F.C. Copenhagen	4–1	AGF	Copenhagen
19:00	Santander 10'; Johansson 23'; Ankersen 51'; Falk (yellow card) 68'; Fischer 76'	FCK Summary	Junker (yellow card) 2'; Stage 13'; Backman (yellow card) 71'	Stadium: Telia Parken; Attendance: 16,379; Referee: Michael Tykgaard

=== Sydbank Pokalen ===
==== Sydbank Pokalen ====
20 September 2017 Third Round	Skive IK	0–3	F.C. Copenhagen	Skive
18:15		FCK Summary	Holse 5', 36'; Matić (yellow card) 62'; Kusk 68'	Stadium: SPAR Nord Arena; Attendance: 2,364; Referee: Michael Tykgaard

4 February 2018 Fourth Round	F.C. Copenhagen	0–1	Brøndby IF	Copenhagen
12:30	Zeca (yellow card) 19'	FCK Summary	Hermannsson (yellow card) 21'; Wilczek 33'; Jung (yellow card) 67'	Stadium: Telia Parken; Attendance: 19,645; Referee: Michael Tykgaard

=== UEFA Champions League ===
==== Second qualifying round ====
Team 1	Agg.	Team 2	1st leg	2nd leg
MŠK Žilina (Slovakia)	3–4	(Denmark) F.C. Copenhagen	1–3	2–1

12 July 2017 Second Qualifying Round - First Leg	MŠK Žilina (Slovakia)	1–3	(Denmark) F.C. Copenhagen	Žilina, Slovakia
20:15	Káčer (yellow card) 35' (yellow-red card) 61'; Špalek 39'; Díaz (yellow card) 57'	FCK Summary	Kvist (yellow card) 51'; Pavlović 68', 73', 83'	Stadium: Štadión pod Dubňom; Attendance: 10,023; Referee: (France) Benoît Millot

19 July 2017 Second Qualifying Round - Second Leg	F.C. Copenhagen (Denmark)	1–2	(Slovakia) MŠK Žilina	Copenhagen
19:30	Verbič 48' (pen.)	FCK Summary	Otubanjo 19'; Kaša 57'; Vavro (yellow card) 69'; Škvarka (yellow card) 85'	Stadium: Telia Parken; Attendance: 9,140; Referee: (Belgium) Jonathan Lardot

Last updated: 19 July 2017.
Source: UEFA Champions League

==== Third qualifying round ====
Team 1	Agg.	Team 2	1st leg	2nd leg
FK Vardar (North Macedonia)	2–4	(Denmark) F.C. Copenhagen	1–0	1–4

25 July 2017 Third Qualifying Round - First Leg	FK Vardar (North Macedonia)	1–0	(Denmark) F.C. Copenhagen	Skopje, Macedonia
20:00	Balotelli 65'; Hambardzumyan (yellow card) 71'	FCK Summary	Toutouh (yellow card) 21'; Johansson (yellow card) 37'	Stadium: Philip II Arena; Attendance: 12,000; Referee: (Germany) Daniel Siebert

2 August 2017 Third Qualifying Round - Second Leg	F.C. Copenhagen (Denmark)	4–1	(North Macedonia) FK Vardar	Copenhagen
20:00	Greguš 2' (yellow card) 28' (yellow-red card) 71'; Barseghyan 26' (o.g.); Santander 75' (yellow card) 76'; Sotiriou 88' (pen.)		Nikolov 19'; Demiri (yellow card) 62'	Stadium: Telia Parken; Attendance: 15,224; Referee: (Scotland) John Beaton

Last updated: 2 August 2017.
Source: UEFA Champions League

==== Playoff round ====
Team 1	Agg.	Team 2	1st leg	2nd leg
Qarabağ FK (Azerbaijan)	2–2 (a)	(Denmark) F.C. Copenhagen	1–0	1–2

15 August 2017 Playoff Round - First Leg	Qarabağ FK (Azerbaijan)	1–0	(Denmark) F.C. Copenhagen	Baku, Azerbaijan
18:00	Madatov 25'	FCK Summary	Verbič (yellow card) 71'; Amankwaa (yellow card) 90+3'	Stadium: Tofiq Bahramov Republican Stadium; Attendance: 31,250; Referee: (Italy) Paolo Tagliavento

23 August 2017 Playoff Round - Second Leg	F.C. Copenhagen (Denmark)	2–1	(Azerbaijan) Qarabağ FK	Copenhagen
20:45	Lüftner (yellow card) 4'; Santander 45'; Pavlović 66'; Ankersen (yellow card) 77'; Toutouh (yellow card) 86'	FCK Summary	Míchel (yellow card) 44'; Ndlovu 63' (yellow card) 90+3'; Rzeźniczak (yellow card) 75'	Stadium: Telia Parken; Attendance: 21,222; Referee: (Spain) Alberto Undiano Mallenco

Last updated: 22 August 2017.
Source: UEFA Champions League

=== UEFA Europa League ===
==== Group stage ====
Pos	Team	Pld	W	D	L	GF	GA	GD	Pts	Qualification	LOM	KOB	SHE	ZLI
1	(Russia) Lokomotiv Moscow	6	3	2	1	9	4	+5	11	Advance to knockout phase	—	2–1	1–2	3–0
2	(Denmark) Copenhagen	6	2	3	1	7	3	+4	9 (Note: Head-to-head results: Sheriff Tiraspol 0–0 Copenhagen, Copenhagen 2–0 Sheriff Tiraspol.)	Advance to knockout phase	0–0	—	2–0	3–0
3	(Moldova) Sheriff Tiraspol	6	2	3	1	4	4	0	9		1–1	0–0	—	1–0
4	(Czech Republic) Fastav Zlín	6	0	2	4	1	10	−9	2		0–2	1–1	0–0	—

Source: UEFA
Notes:

14 September 2017 Group Stage - Matchday 1	F.C. Copenhagen (Denmark)	0–0	(Russia) FC Lokomotiv Moscow	Copenhagen
19:00	Zeca (yellow card) 69'	FCK Summary	Rybus (yellow card) 26'; Mykhalyk (yellow card) 45'; Tarasov (yellow card) 84'	Stadium: Telia Parken; Attendance: 17,285; Referee: (Turkey) Hüseyin Göçek

28 September 2017 Group Stage - Matchday 2	FC Sheriff Tiraspol (Moldova)	0–0	(Denmark) F.C. Copenhagen	Tiraspol, Moldova
19:00	Kulušić (yellow card) 87'	FCK Summary		Stadium: Sheriff Stadium; Attendance: 9,000; Referee: (Malta) Clayton Pisani

19 October 2017 Group Stage - Matchday 3	FC Fastav Zlín (Czech Republic)	1–1	(Denmark) F.C. Copenhagen	Olomouc, Czech Republic
21:05	Diop 11'; Traoré (yellow card) 56'; Mehanović (yellow card) 58'; Bačo (yellow card) 62'	FCK Summary	Peter Ankersen 19'; Kvist (yellow card) 42'	Stadium: Andrův Stadion; Attendance: 6,245; Referee: (Austria) Oliver Drachta

2 November 2017 Group Stage - Matchday 4	F.C. Copenhagen (Denmark)	3–0	(Czech Republic) FC Fastav Zlín	Copenhagen
19:00	Sotiriou (yellow card) 20'; Lüftner 40'; Verbič 49', 90+2'; Zeca (yellow card) 74'; Matić (yellow card) 88'	FCK Summary		Stadium: Telia Parken; Attendance: 16,189; Referee: (Montenegro) Nikola Dabanović

23 November 2017 Group Stage - Matchday 5	FC Lokomotiv Moscow (Russia)	2–1	(Denmark) F.C. Copenhagen	Moscow, Russia
19:00	Farfán 17', 51'; Mykhalyk (yellow card) 63'; Denisov (yellow card) 85'	FCK Summary	Verbič 31'	Stadium: RZD Arena; Attendance: 10,806; Referee: (Spain) Javier Estrada

7 December 2017 Group Stage - Matchday 6	F.C. Copenhagen (Denmark)	2–0	(Moldova) FC Sheriff Tiraspol	Copenhagen
19:00	Zeca (yellow card) 48'; Sotiriou 56'; Lüftner 59'	FCK Summary	Cristiano (yellow card) 37'; Kulušić (yellow card) 44'; Racu (yellow card) 45+1'; Jairo (red card) 69'; Sušić (yellow card) 71'	Stadium: Telia Parken; Attendance: 14,246; Referee: (Netherlands) Serdar Gözübüyük

==== Round of 32 ====
Team 1	Agg.	Team 2	1st leg	2nd leg
F.C. Copenhagen (Denmark)	1–5	(Spain) Atlético Madrid	1–4	0–1

15 February 2018 Round of 32 - First Leg	F.C. Copenhagen (Denmark)	1–4	(Spain) Atlético Madrid	Copenhagen
21:05	Fischer 15'; Skov (yellow card) 23'	FCK Summary	Saúl 21'; Gameiro 37'; Correa (yellow card) 44'; Griezmann 71'; Vitolo 77'	Stadium: Telia Parken; Attendance: 34,912; Referee: (Belarus) Alexey Kulbakov

22 February 2018 Round of 32 - Second Leg	Atlético Madrid (Spain)	1–0	(Denmark) F.C. Copenhagen	Madrid, Spain
19:00	Gameiro 7'	FCK Summary		Stadium: Wanda Metropolitano; Attendance: 44,000; Referee: (Lithuania) Gediminas Mažeika

Last updated: 22 February 2018.
Source: UEFA Europa League
