= 2017–18 UEFA Europa League group stage =

International football competition

The 2017–18 UEFA Europa League group stage began on 14 September and ended on 7 December 2017. A total of 48 teams competed in the group stage to decide 24 of the 32 places in the knockout phase of the 2017–18 UEFA Europa League.

== Draw ==
The draw for the group stage was held on 25 August 2017, 13:00 CEST, at the Grimaldi Forum in Monaco.

The 48 teams were drawn into twelve groups of four, with the restriction that teams from the same association could not be drawn against each other. For the draw, the teams were seeded into four pots based on their 2017 UEFA club coefficients.

On 17 July 2014, the UEFA emergency panel ruled that Ukrainian and Russian clubs would not be drawn against each other "until further notice" due to the political unrest between the countries.

Moreover, the draw was controlled for teams from the same association in order to split the teams evenly into the two sets of four groups (A–F, G–L) for maximum television coverage. On each matchday, one set of six groups played their matches at 19:00 CEST/CET, while the other set of six groups played their matches at 21:05 CEST/CET, with the two sets of groups alternating between each matchday.

The fixtures were decided after the draw, using a computer draw not shown to public, with the following match sequence (Regulations Article 15.02):

Matchday	Matches (Note: Positions for scheduling did not use the seeding pots, e.g., Team 1 was not necessarily the team from Pot 1 in the draw.)
Matchday 1	2 v 3, 4 v 1
Matchday 2	1 v 2, 3 v 4
Matchday 3	3 v 1, 2 v 4
Matchday 4	1 v 3, 4 v 2
Matchday 5	3 v 2, 1 v 4
Matchday 6	2 v 1, 4 v 3

There were certain scheduling restrictions: for example, teams from the same city in general were not scheduled to play at home on the same matchday (to avoid teams from the same city playing at home on the same day, due to logistics and crowd control), and teams in certain countries (e.g., Russia) were not scheduled to play at home on the last matchday (due to cold weather and simultaneous kick-off times).

== Teams ==
Below were the participating teams (with their 2017 UEFA club coefficients), grouped by their seeding pot. They included 16 teams which entered in this stage, the 22 winners of the play-off round, and the 10 losers of the Champions League play-off round (5 in Champions Route, 5 in League Route).

Key to colours
Group winners and runners-up advanced to the round of 32

Pot 1
Team	Notes	Coeff.
(England) Arsenal		105.192
(Russia) Zenit Saint Petersburg		87.106
(France) Lyon		68.833
(Ukraine) Dynamo Kyiv		67.526
(Spain) Villarreal		64.999
(Spain) Athletic Bilbao		60.999
(Italy) Lazio		56.666
(Italy) Milan		47.666
(Czech Republic) Viktoria Plzeň		40.635
(Austria) Red Bull Salzburg		40.570
(Denmark) Copenhagen		37.800
(Portugal) Braga		37.366

Pot 2
Team	Notes	Coeff.
(Romania) FCSB		35.370
(Bulgaria) Ludogorets Razgrad		34.175
(Belarus) BATE Borisov		29.475
(England) Everton		29.192
(Switzerland) Young Boys		28.915
(France) Marseille		28.333
(Spain) Real Sociedad		27.499
(Israel) Maccabi Tel Aviv		23.375
(Russia) Lokomotiv Moscow		20.606
Austria Wien		17.070
(Germany) Hertha BSC		16.899
(France) Nice		16.833

Pot 3
Team	Notes	Coeff.
(Kazakhstan) Astana		16.800
(Serbia) Partizan		16.075
(Germany) TSG Hoffenheim		15.899
(Germany) 1. FC Köln		15.899
(Croatia) Rijeka		15.550
(Portugal) Vitória de Guimarães		14.866
(Italy) Atalanta		14.666
(Belgium) Zulte Waregem		14.480
(Ukraine) Zorya Luhansk		13.526
(Norway) Rosenborg		12.665
(Moldova) Sheriff Tiraspol		11.150
(Israel) Hapoel Be'er Sheva		10.875

Pot 4
Team	Notes	Coeff.
(Cyprus) Apollon Limassol		10.710
(Turkey) İstanbul Başakşehir		10.340
(Turkey) Konyaspor		9.840
(Netherlands) Vitesse		9.212
(Czech Republic) Slavia Prague		8.135
(Serbia) Red Star Belgrade		7.325
(Albania) Skënderbeu		6.825
(Czech Republic) Fastav Zlín		6.635
(Greece) AEK Athens		6.580
(Switzerland) Lugano		6.415
(North Macedonia) Vardar		5.125
(Sweden) Östersunds FK		3.945

Notes

1. ^{EL-PO} Winners of the play-off round.
2. ^{CL-CR} Losers of the Champions League play-off round (Champions Route).
3. ^{CL-LR} Losers of the Champions League play-off round (League Route).

== Format ==
In each group, teams played against each other home-and-away in a round-robin format. The group winners and runners-up advanced to the round of 32, where they were joined by the eight third-placed teams of the Champions League group stage.

=== Tiebreakers ===
Teams were ranked according to points (3 points for a win, 1 point for a draw, 0 points for a loss), and if tied on points, the following tiebreaking criteria were applied, in the order given, to determine the rankings (Regulations Articles 16.01):

1. Points in head-to-head matches among tied teams;
2. Goal difference in head-to-head matches among tied teams;
3. Goals scored in head-to-head matches among tied teams;
4. Away goals scored in head-to-head matches among tied teams;
5. If more than two teams were tied, and after applying all head-to-head criteria above, a subset of teams were still tied, all head-to-head criteria above were reapplied exclusively to this subset of teams;
6. Goal difference in all group matches;
7. Goals scored in all group matches;
8. Away goals scored in all group matches;
9. Wins in all group matches;
10. Away wins in all group matches;
11. Disciplinary points (red card = 3 points, yellow card = 1 point, expulsion for two yellow cards in one match = 3 points);
12. UEFA club coefficient.

== Groups ==
The matchdays were 14 September, 28 September, 19 October, 2 November, 23 November, and 7 December 2017. The match kickoff times were 19:00 and 21:05 CEST/CET in general, except for certain matches for geographical reasons.

Times up to 28 October 2017 (matchdays 1–3) were CEST (UTC+2), thereafter (matchdays 4–6) times were CET (UTC+1).

=== Group A ===
Pos	Team	Pld	W	D	L	GF	GA	GD	Pts	Qualification	VIL	AST	SLP	MTA
1	(Spain) Villarreal	6	3	2	1	10	6	+4	11	Advance to knockout phase	—	3–1	2–2	0–1
2	(Kazakhstan) Astana	6	3	1	2	10	7	+3	10	Advance to knockout phase	2–3	—	1–1	4–0
3	(Czech Republic) Slavia Prague	6	2	2	2	6	6	0	8		0–2	0–1	—	1–0
4	(Israel) Maccabi Tel Aviv	6	1	1	4	1	8	−7	4		0–0	0–1	0–2	—

Source: UEFA
Rules for classification: Group stage tiebreakers
14 September 2017
19:00

Villarreal (Spain)	3–1	(Kazakhstan) Astana
Sansone 16'; Bakambu 75'; Cheryshev 77'	Report	Logvinenko 68'

Estadio de la Cerámica, Villarreal
Attendance: 14,670
Referee: Srđan Jovanović (Serbia)
14 September 2017
19:00

Slavia Prague (Czech Republic)	1–0	(Israel) Maccabi Tel Aviv
Necid 12'	Report

Eden Arena, Prague
Attendance: 13,035
Referee: Robert Schörgenhofer (Austria)

28 September 2017
17:00

Astana (Kazakhstan)	1–1	(Czech Republic) Slavia Prague
Tomasov 42'	Report	Ngadeu-Ngadjui 18'

Astana Arena, Astana
Attendance: 17,215
Referee: Andreas Ekberg (Sweden)
28 September 2017
21:05

Maccabi Tel Aviv (Israel)	0–0	(Spain) Villarreal
	Report

Netanya Stadium, Netanya (Note: Maccabi Tel Aviv played their home matches at Netanya Stadium, Netanya, instead of their regular stadium Bloomfield Stadium, Tel Aviv, due to renovation.)
Attendance: 11,865
Referee: Craig Pawson (England)

19 October 2017
17:00

Astana (Kazakhstan)	4–0	(Israel) Maccabi Tel Aviv
Twumasi 33' (pen.), 42'; Kabananga 47', 52'	Report

Astana Arena, Astana
Attendance: 10,350
Referee: Serhiy Boyko (Ukraine)
19 October 2017
21:05

Villarreal (Spain)	2–2	(Czech Republic) Slavia Prague
Trigueros 41'; Bacca 44'	Report	Necid 18'; Danny 30'

Estadio de la Cerámica, Villarreal
Attendance: 15,634
Referee: Svein Oddvar Moen (Norway)

2 November 2017
19:00

Maccabi Tel Aviv (Israel)	0–1	(Kazakhstan) Astana
	Report	Twumasi 57'

Netanya Stadium, Netanya
Attendance: 7,934
Referee: Paweł Raczkowski (Poland)
2 November 2017
19:00

Slavia Prague (Czech Republic)	0–2	(Spain) Villarreal
	Report	Bacca 15'; Deli 89' (o.g.)

Eden Arena, Prague
Attendance: 18,403
Referee: Bobby Madden (Scotland)

23 November 2017
17:00

Astana (Kazakhstan)	2–3	(Spain) Villarreal
Kabananga 22'; Twumasi 88'	Report	Raba 39'; Bakambu 65', 83'

Astana Arena, Astana
Attendance: 29,800
Referee: Gediminas Mažeika (Lithuania)
23 November 2017
21:05

Maccabi Tel Aviv (Israel)	0–2	(Czech Republic) Slavia Prague
	Report	Hušbauer 45+1', 54'

Netanya Stadium, Netanya
Attendance: 6,874
Referee: István Kovács (Romania)

7 December 2017
19:00

Villarreal (Spain)	0–1	(Israel) Maccabi Tel Aviv
	Report	Blackman 60'

Estadio de la Cerámica, Villarreal
Attendance: 12,613
Referee: Mads-Kristoffer Kristoffersen (Denmark)
7 December 2017
19:00

Slavia Prague (Czech Republic)	0–1	(Kazakhstan) Astana
	Report	Aničić 38'

Eden Arena, Prague
Attendance: 14,198
Referee: Davide Massa (Italy)

=== Group B ===
Pos	Team	Pld	W	D	L	GF	GA	GD	Pts	Qualification	DKV	PAR	YB	SKE
1	(Ukraine) Dynamo Kyiv	6	4	1	1	15	9	+6	13	Advance to knockout phase	—	4–1	2–2	3–1
2	(Serbia) Partizan	6	2	2	2	8	9	−1	8	Advance to knockout phase	2–3	—	2–1	2–0
3	(Switzerland) Young Boys	6	1	3	2	7	8	−1	6		0–1	1–1	—	2–1
4	(Albania) Skënderbeu	6	1	2	3	6	10	−4	5		3–2	0–0	1–1	—

Source: UEFA
Rules for classification: Group stage tiebreakers
14 September 2017
19:00

Dynamo Kyiv (Ukraine)	3–1	(Albania) Skënderbeu
Sydorchuk 47'; Júnior Moraes 49'; Mbokani 65' (pen.)	Report	Muzaka 39'

NSC Olimpiyskiy Stadium, Kyiv
Attendance: 24,893
Referee: Bart Vertenten (Belgium)
14 September 2017
19:00

Young Boys (Switzerland)	1–1	(Serbia) Partizan
Fassnacht 14'	Report	Janković 11'

Stade de Suisse, Bern
Attendance: 13,004
Referee: István Kovács (Romania)

28 September 2017
21:05

Partizan (Serbia)	2–3	(Ukraine) Dynamo Kyiv
Ožegović 34'; Tawamba 42'	Report	Júnior Moraes 54' (pen.), 84'; Buyalskyi 68'

Partizan Stadium, Belgrade
Attendance: 0 (Note: The Partizan v Dynamo Kyiv match was played behind closed doors due to punishment by UEFA.)
Referee: Svein Oddvar Moen (Norway)
28 September 2017
21:05

Skënderbeu (Albania)	1–1	(Switzerland) Young Boys
Sowe 65'	Report	Assalé 72'

Elbasan Arena, Elbasan (Note: Skënderbeu played their home matches at Elbasan Arena, Elbasan, instead of their regular stadium Skënderbeu Stadium, Korçë, which did not meet UEFA requirements.)
Attendance: 3,300
Referee: Kevin Blom (Netherlands)

19 October 2017
21:05

Skënderbeu (Albania)	0–0	(Serbia) Partizan
	Report

Elbasan Arena, Elbasan
Attendance: 6,300
Referee: Daniel Stefański (Poland)
19 October 2017
21:05

Dynamo Kyiv (Ukraine)	2–2	(Switzerland) Young Boys
Mbokani 34'; Morozyuk 49'	Report	Assalé 17', 40'

NSC Olimpiyskiy Stadium, Kyiv
Attendance: 21,789
Referee: Mattias Gestranius (Finland)

2 November 2017
19:00

Partizan (Serbia)	2–0	(Albania) Skënderbeu
Tošić 39'; Tawamba 66'	Report

Partizan Stadium, Belgrade
Attendance: 12,659
Referee: Carlos del Cerro Grande (Spain)
2 November 2017
19:00

Young Boys (Switzerland)	0–1	(Ukraine) Dynamo Kyiv
	Report	Buyalskyi 70'

Stade de Suisse, Bern
Attendance: 10,077
Referee: Tony Chapron (France)

23 November 2017
21:05

Skënderbeu (Albania)	3–2	(Ukraine) Dynamo Kyiv
Lilaj 18'; Adeniyi 52'; Sowe 56'	Report	Tsyhankov 16'; Rusyn 90+1'

Elbasan Arena, Elbasan
Attendance: 100 (Note: The Skënderbeu Korçë v Dynamo Kyiv match was played behind closed doors due to punishment by UEFA.)
Referee: Oliver Drachta (Austria)
23 November 2017
21:05

Partizan (Serbia)	2–1	(Switzerland) Young Boys
Tawamba 12'; Ožegović 53'	Report	Ngamaleu 25'

Partizan Stadium, Belgrade
Attendance: 20,568
Referee: Tamás Bognár (Hungary)

7 December 2017
19:00

Dynamo Kyiv (Ukraine)	4–1	(Serbia) Partizan
Morozyuk 6'; Júnior Moraes 28', 31', 77' (pen.)	Report	Jevtović 45+4' (pen.)

NSC Olimpiyskiy Stadium, Kyiv
Attendance: 14,678
Referee: Paweł Gil (Poland)
7 December 2017
19:00

Young Boys (Switzerland)	2–1	(Albania) Skënderbeu
Hoarau 55'; Assalé 90+5'	Report	Gavazaj 51'

Stade de Suisse, Bern
Attendance: 8,209
Referee: Simon Lee Evans (Wales)

=== Group C ===
Pos	Team	Pld	W	D	L	GF	GA	GD	Pts	Qualification	BRA	LUD	IBS	HOF
1	(Portugal) Braga	6	3	1	2	9	8	+1	10	Advance to knockout phase	—	0–2	2–1	3–1
2	(Bulgaria) Ludogorets Razgrad	6	2	3	1	7	5	+2	9	Advance to knockout phase	1–1	—	1–2	2–1
3	(Turkey) İstanbul Başakşehir	6	2	2	2	7	8	−1	8		2–1	0–0	—	1–1
4	(Germany) TSG Hoffenheim	6	1	2	3	8	10	−2	5		1–2	1–1	3–1	—

Source: UEFA
Rules for classification: Group stage tiebreakers
14 September 2017
19:00

TSG Hoffenheim (Germany)	1–2	(Portugal) Braga
Wagner 24'	Report	Teixeira 45+1'; Dyego Sousa 50'

Rhein-Neckar-Arena, Sinsheim
Attendance: 15,714
Referee: Bobby Madden (Scotland)
14 September 2017
19:00

İstanbul Başakşehir (Turkey)	0–0	(Bulgaria) Ludogorets Razgrad
	Report

Başakşehir Fatih Terim Stadium, Istanbul
Attendance: 6,804
Referee: Stefan Johannesson (Sweden)

28 September 2017
21:05

Ludogorets Razgrad (Bulgaria)	2–1	(Germany) TSG Hoffenheim
Dyakov 46'; Lukoki 72'	Report	Kadeřábek 2'

Ludogorets Arena, Razgrad
Attendance: 6,155
Referee: Paweł Raczkowski (Poland)
28 September 2017
21:05

Braga (Portugal)	2–1	(Turkey) İstanbul Başakşehir
Hassan 26'; Fransérgio 89'	Report	Belözoğlu 28'

Estádio Municipal, Braga
Attendance: 10,376
Referee: Matej Jug (Slovenia)

19 October 2017
21:05

Braga (Portugal)	0–2	(Bulgaria) Ludogorets Razgrad
	Report	Moți 25'; Raul Silva 56' (o.g.)

Estádio Municipal, Braga
Attendance: 8,623
Referee: Davide Massa (Italy)
19 October 2017
21:05

TSG Hoffenheim (Germany)	3–1	(Turkey) İstanbul Başakşehir
Hübner 52'; Amiri 59'; Schulz 75'	Report	Napoleoni 90+3'

Rhein-Neckar-Arena, Sinsheim
Attendance: 21,167
Referee: Aleksei Eskov (Russia)

2 November 2017
19:00

Ludogorets Razgrad (Bulgaria)	1–1	(Portugal) Braga
Marcelinho 68'	Report	Fransérgio 83'

Ludogorets Arena, Razgrad
Attendance: 7,544
Referee: Vladislav Bezborodov (Russia)
2 November 2017
19:00

İstanbul Başakşehir (Turkey)	1–1	(Germany) TSG Hoffenheim
Višća 90+3'	Report	Grillitsch 47'

Başakşehir Fatih Terim Stadium, Istanbul
Attendance: 5,214
Referee: Harald Lechner (Austria)

23 November 2017
21:05

Braga (Portugal)	3–1	(Germany) TSG Hoffenheim
Marcelo Goiano 1'; Fransérgio 81', 90+3'	Report	Uth 74'

Estádio Municipal, Braga
Attendance: 10,054
Referee: Andre Marriner (England)
23 November 2017
21:05

Ludogorets Razgrad (Bulgaria)	1–2	(Turkey) İstanbul Başakşehir
Marcelinho 65'	Report	Višća 20'; Frei 27'

Ludogorets Arena, Razgrad
Attendance: 7,520
Referee: Miroslav Zelinka (Czech Republic)

7 December 2017
19:00

TSG Hoffenheim (Germany)	1–1	(Bulgaria) Ludogorets Razgrad
Ochs 25'	Report	Wanderson 62'

Rhein-Neckar-Arena, Sinsheim
Attendance: 7,814
Referee: Orel Grinfeld (Israel)
7 December 2017
19:00

İstanbul Başakşehir (Turkey)	2–1	(Portugal) Braga
Višća 10'; Belözoğlu 77' (pen.)	Report	Raul Silva 55'

Başakşehir Fatih Terim Stadium, Istanbul
Attendance: 5,241
Referee: John Beaton (Scotland)

=== Group D ===
Pos	Team	Pld	W	D	L	GF	GA	GD	Pts	Qualification	MIL	AEK	RJK	AW
1	(Italy) Milan	6	3	2	1	13	6	+7	11	Advance to knockout phase	—	0–0	3–2	5–1
2	(Greece) AEK Athens	6	1	5	0	6	5	+1	8	Advance to knockout phase	0–0	—	2–2	2–2
3	(Croatia) Rijeka	6	2	1	3	11	12	−1	7		2–0	1–2	—	1–4
4	Austria Wien	6	1	2	3	9	16	−7	5		1–5	0–0	1–3	—

Source: UEFA
Rules for classification: Group stage tiebreakers
14 September 2017
19:00

Austria Wien	1–5	(Italy) Milan
Borković 47'	Report	Çalhanoğlu 7'; Silva 10', 20', 56'; Suso 63'

Ernst-Happel-Stadion, Vienna (Note: Austria Wien played their home matches at Ernst-Happel-Stadion, Vienna, instead of their regular stadium Franz Horr Stadium, Vienna, due to reconstruction.)
Attendance: 31,409
Referee: Serdar Gözübüyük (Netherlands)
14 September 2017
19:00

Rijeka (Croatia)	1–2	(Greece) AEK Athens
Elez 29'	Report	Mantalos 16'; Christodoulopoulos 62'

Stadion Rujevica, Rijeka
Attendance: 5,932
Referee: John Beaton (Scotland)

28 September 2017
21:05

AEK Athens (Greece)	2–2	Austria Wien
Livaja 28', 90'	Report	Monschein 43'; Tajouri 49'

Olympic Stadium, Athens
Attendance: 16,954
Referee: Paweł Gil (Poland)
28 September 2017
21:05

Milan (Italy)	3–2	(Croatia) Rijeka
Silva 14'; Musacchio 53'; Cutrone 90+4'	Report	Acosty 84'; Elez 90' (pen.)

San Siro, Milan
Attendance: 23,917
Referee: Orel Grinfeld (Israel)

19 October 2017
21:05

Milan (Italy)	0–0	(Greece) AEK Athens
	Report

San Siro, Milan
Attendance: 20,812
Referee: Andreas Ekberg (Sweden)
19 October 2017
21:05

Austria Wien	1–3	(Croatia) Rijeka
Friesenbichler 90'	Report	Gavranović 21', 31'; Kvržić 90+2'

Ernst-Happel-Stadion, Vienna
Attendance: 20,690
Referee: Sandro Schärer (Switzerland)

2 November 2017
19:00

AEK Athens (Greece)	0–0	(Italy) Milan
	Report

Olympic Stadium, Athens
Attendance: 40,538
Referee: Jorge Sousa (Portugal)
2 November 2017
19:00

Rijeka (Croatia)	1–4	Austria Wien
Pavičić 61'	Report	Prokop 41', 62'; Serbest 73'; Monschein 83'

Stadion Rujevica, Rijeka
Attendance: 7,912
Referee: Jakob Kehlet (Denmark)

23 November 2017
21:05

Milan (Italy)	5–1	Austria Wien
Rodríguez 27'; Silva 36', 70'; Cutrone 42', 90+3'	Report	Monschein 21'

San Siro, Milan
Attendance: 17,932
Referee: Andris Treimanis (Latvia)
23 November 2017
21:05

AEK Athens (Greece)	2–2	(Croatia) Rijeka
Araujo 45+2'; Christodoulopoulos 55'	Report	Gorgon 8', 26'

Olympic Stadium, Athens
Attendance: 17,100
Referee: Mattias Gestranius (Finland)

7 December 2017
19:00

Austria Wien	0–0	(Greece) AEK Athens
	Report

Ernst-Happel-Stadion, Vienna
Attendance: 23,133
Referee: Craig Pawson (England)
7 December 2017
19:00

Rijeka (Croatia)	2–0	(Italy) Milan
Puljić 7'; Gavranović 47'	Report

Stadion Rujevica, Rijeka
Attendance: 8,021
Referee: István Vad (Hungary)

=== Group E ===
Pos	Team	Pld	W	D	L	GF	GA	GD	Pts	Qualification	ATA	LYO	EVE	APL
1	(Italy) Atalanta	6	4	2	0	14	4	+10	14	Advance to knockout phase	—	1–0	3–0	3–1
2	(France) Lyon	6	3	2	1	11	4	+7	11	Advance to knockout phase	1–1	—	3–0	4–0
3	(England) Everton	6	1	1	4	7	15	−8	4		1–5	1–2	—	2–2
4	(Cyprus) Apollon Limassol	6	0	3	3	5	14	−9	3		1–1	1–1	0–3	—

Source: UEFA
Rules for classification: Group stage tiebreakers
14 September 2017
19:00

Atalanta (Italy)	3–0	(England) Everton
Masiello 27'; Gómez 41'; Cristante 44'	Report

Mapei Stadium – Città del Tricolore, Reggio Emilia (Note: Atalanta played their home matches at Mapei Stadium – Città del Tricolore, Reggio Emilia, instead of their regular stadium Stadio Atleti Azzurri d'Italia, Bergamo, which wasn't given a UEFA licence to hold games.)
Attendance: 14,490
Referee: Vladislav Bezborodov (Russia)
14 September 2017
19:00

Apollon Limassol (Cyprus)	1–1	(France) Lyon
Sardinero 90+3'	Report	Depay 53' (pen.)

GSP Stadium, Nicosia (Note: Apollon Limassol played their home matches at GSP Stadium, Nicosia, instead of their regular stadium Tsirio Stadium, Limassol.)
Attendance: 5,134
Referee: Miroslav Zelinka (Czech Republic)

28 September 2017
21:05

Lyon (France)	1–1	(Italy) Atalanta
Traoré 45'	Report	Gómez 57'

Groupama Stadium, Décines-Charpieu
Attendance: 27,715
Referee: Daniel Siebert (Germany)
28 September 2017
21:05

Everton (England)	2–2	(Cyprus) Apollon Limassol
Rooney 21'; Vlašić 66'	Report	Sardinero 12'; Yuste 88'

Goodison Park, Liverpool
Attendance: 27,034
Referee: Tamás Bognár (Hungary)

19 October 2017
21:05

Everton (England)	1–2	(France) Lyon
Williams 69'	Report	Fekir 6' (pen.); Traoré 75'

Goodison Park, Liverpool
Attendance: 27,159
Referee: Bas Nijhuis (Netherlands)
19 October 2017
21:05

Atalanta (Italy)	3–1	(Cyprus) Apollon Limassol
Iličić 12'; Petagna 64'; Freuler 66'	Report	Schembri 59'

Mapei Stadium – Città del Tricolore, Reggio Emilia
Attendance: 13,803
Referee: Georgi Kabakov (Bulgaria)

2 November 2017
19:00

Lyon (France)	3–0	(England) Everton
Traoré 68'; Aouar 76'; Depay 88'	Report

Groupama Stadium, Décines-Charpieu
Attendance: 48,103
Referee: Orel Grinfeld (Israel)
2 November 2017
19:00

Apollon Limassol (Cyprus)	1–1	(Italy) Atalanta
Zelaya 90+4'	Report	Iličić 35' (pen.)

GSP Stadium, Nicosia
Attendance: 5,658
Referee: Andris Treimanis (Latvia)

23 November 2017
21:05

Everton (England)	1–5	(Italy) Atalanta
Sandro 71'	Report	Cristante 12', 64'; Gosens 86'; Cornelius 88', 90+4'

Goodison Park, Liverpool
Attendance: 17,431
Referee: Jakob Kehlet (Denmark)
23 November 2017
21:05

Lyon (France)	4–0	(Cyprus) Apollon Limassol
Diakhaby 29'; Fekir 32'; Mariano 67'; Maolida 90'	Report

Groupama Stadium, Décines-Charpieu
Attendance: 26,972
Referee: Paweł Raczkowski (Poland)

7 December 2017
19:00

Atalanta (Italy)	1–0	(France) Lyon
Petagna 10'	Report

Mapei Stadium – Città del Tricolore, Reggio Emilia
Attendance: 13,925
Referee: Aleksei Eskov (Russia)
7 December 2017
19:00

Apollon Limassol (Cyprus)	0–3	(England) Everton
	Report	Lookman 21', 27'; Vlašić 87'

GSP Stadium, Nicosia
Attendance: 4,237
Referee: Sébastien Delferière (Belgium)

=== Group F ===
Pos	Team	Pld	W	D	L	GF	GA	GD	Pts	Qualification	LOM	KOB	SHE	ZLI
1	(Russia) Lokomotiv Moscow	6	3	2	1	9	4	+5	11	Advance to knockout phase	—	2–1	1–2	3–0
2	(Denmark) Copenhagen	6	2	3	1	7	3	+4	9 (Note: Head-to-head results: Sheriff Tiraspol 0–0 Copenhagen, Copenhagen 2–0 Sheriff Tiraspol.)	Advance to knockout phase	0–0	—	2–0	3–0
3	(Moldova) Sheriff Tiraspol	6	2	3	1	4	4	0	9		1–1	0–0	—	1–0
4	(Czech Republic) Fastav Zlín	6	0	2	4	1	10	−9	2		0–2	1–1	0–0	—

Source: UEFA
Rules for classification: Group stage tiebreakers
Notes:
14 September 2017
19:00

Fastav Zlín (Czech Republic)	0–0	(Moldova) Sheriff Tiraspol
	Report

Andrův stadion, Olomouc (Note: Fastav Zlín played their home matches at Andrův stadion, Olomouc, instead of their regular stadium Letná Stadion, Zlín.)
Attendance: 4,499
Referee: Andrew Dallas (Scotland)
14 September 2017
19:00

Copenhagen (Denmark)	0–0	(Russia) Lokomotiv Moscow
	Report

Parken Stadium, Copenhagen
Attendance: 17,285
Referee: Hüseyin Göçek (Turkey)

28 September 2017
21:05

Lokomotiv Moscow (Russia)	3–0	(Czech Republic) Fastav Zlín
Fernandes 2' (pen.), 6', 17'	Report

RZD Arena, Moscow
Attendance: 10,065
Referee: Simon Lee Evans (Wales)
28 September 2017
21:05

Sheriff Tiraspol (Moldova)	0–0	(Denmark) Copenhagen
	Report

Sheriff Stadium, Tiraspol
Attendance: 5,070
Referee: Clayton Pisani (Malta)

19 October 2017
21:05

Sheriff Tiraspol (Moldova)	1–1	(Russia) Lokomotiv Moscow
Badibanga 31'	Report	Anton Miranchuk 17'

Sheriff Stadium, Tiraspol
Attendance: 10,500
Referee: István Vad (Hungary)
19 October 2017
21:05

Fastav Zlín (Czech Republic)	1–1	(Denmark) Copenhagen
Diop 11'	Report	Ankersen 19'

Andrův stadion, Olomouc
Attendance: 6,245
Referee: Oliver Drachta (Austria)

2 November 2017
19:00

Lokomotiv Moscow (Russia)	1–2	(Moldova) Sheriff Tiraspol
Farfán 26'	Report	Badibanga 41'; Brezovec 58'

RZD Arena, Moscow
Attendance: 10,118
Referee: Sébastien Delferière (Belgium)
2 November 2017
19:00

Copenhagen (Denmark)	3–0	(Czech Republic) Fastav Zlín
Lüftner 40'; Verbič 49', 90+2'	Report

Parken Stadium, Copenhagen
Attendance: 16,189
Referee: Nikola Dabanović (Montenegro)

23 November 2017
19:00

Lokomotiv Moscow (Russia)	2–1	(Denmark) Copenhagen
Farfán 17', 51'	Report	Verbič 31'

RZD Arena, Moscow
Attendance: 10,696
Referee: Xavier Estrada Fernández (Spain)
23 November 2017
21:05

Sheriff Tiraspol (Moldova)	1–0	(Czech Republic) Fastav Zlín
Jairo 11'	Report

Sheriff Stadium, Tiraspol
Attendance: 5,485
Referee: Ola Hobber Nilsen (Norway)

7 December 2017
19:00

Fastav Zlín (Czech Republic)	0–2	(Russia) Lokomotiv Moscow
	Report	Aleksei Miranchuk 70'; Farfán 75'

Andrův stadion, Olomouc
Attendance: 4,682
Referee: Mete Kalkavan (Turkey)
7 December 2017
19:00

Copenhagen (Denmark)	2–0	(Moldova) Sheriff Tiraspol
Sotiriou 56'; Lüftner 59'	Report

Parken Stadium, Copenhagen
Attendance: 14,246
Referee: Serdar Gözübüyük (Netherlands)

=== Group G ===
Pos	Team	Pld	W	D	L	GF	GA	GD	Pts	Qualification	PLZ	FCSB	LUG	HBS
1	(Czech Republic) Viktoria Plzeň	6	4	0	2	13	8	+5	12	Advance to knockout phase	—	2–0	4–1	3–1
2	(Romania) FCSB	6	3	1	2	9	7	+2	10	Advance to knockout phase	3–0	—	1–2	1–1
3	(Switzerland) Lugano	6	3	0	3	9	11	−2	9		3–2	1–2	—	1–0
4	(Israel) Hapoel Be'er Sheva	6	1	1	4	5	10	−5	4		0–2	1–2	2–1	—

Source: UEFA
Rules for classification: Group stage tiebreakers
14 September 2017
21:05

Hapoel Be'er Sheva (Israel)	2–1	(Switzerland) Lugano
Einbinder 2'; Tzedek 60' (pen.)	Report	Tzedek 67' (o.g.)

Turner Stadium, Be'er Sheva
Attendance: 14,752
Referee: Tony Chapron (France)
14 September 2017
21:05

FCSB (Romania)	3–0	(Czech Republic) Viktoria Plzeň
Budescu 21' (pen.), 44'; Alibec 72'	Report

Arena Națională, Bucharest
Attendance: 20,714
Referee: Andris Treimanis (Latvia)

28 September 2017
19:00

Viktoria Plzeň (Czech Republic)	3–1	(Israel) Hapoel Be'er Sheva
Petržela 29'; Kopic 76'; Bakoš 89'	Report	Nwakaeme 69'

Doosan Arena, Plzeň
Attendance: 10,314
Referee: István Vad (Hungary)
28 September 2017
19:00

Lugano (Switzerland)	1–2	(Romania) FCSB
Bottani 14'	Report	Budescu 58'; Júnior Morais 64'

Swissporarena, Lucerne (Note: Lugano played their home matches at Swissporarena, Lucerne, instead of their regular stadium Cornaredo Stadium, Lugano.)
Attendance: 2,680
Referee: Serhiy Boyko (Ukraine)

19 October 2017
19:00

Lugano (Switzerland)	3–2	(Czech Republic) Viktoria Plzeň
Bottani 63'; Carlinhos 69'; Gerndt 88'	Report	Krmenčík 76'; Bakoš 90'

Swissporarena, Lucerne
Attendance: 2,530
Referee: Srđan Jovanović (Serbia)
19 October 2017
19:00

Hapoel Be'er Sheva (Israel)	1–2	(Romania) FCSB
Cuenca 87'	Report	Gnohéré 70', 75'

Turner Stadium, Be'er Sheva
Attendance: 15,117
Referee: Kevin Blom (Netherlands)

2 November 2017
21:05

Viktoria Plzeň (Czech Republic)	4–1	(Switzerland) Lugano
Krmenčík 4', 19'; Hořava 45'; Čermák 56'	Report	Mariani 15'

Doosan Arena, Plzeň
Attendance: 9,483
Referee: Jonathan Lardot (Belgium)
2 November 2017
21:05

FCSB (Romania)	1–1	(Israel) Hapoel Be'er Sheva
Coman 31'	Report	Sahar 37'

Arena Națională, Bucharest
Attendance: 27,134
Referee: Halis Özkahya (Turkey)

23 November 2017
19:00

Lugano (Switzerland)	1–0	(Israel) Hapoel Be'er Sheva
Carlinhos 50'	Report

Swissporarena, Lucerne
Attendance: 3,011
Referee: Harald Lechner (Austria)
23 November 2017
19:00

Viktoria Plzeň (Czech Republic)	2–0	(Romania) FCSB
Petržela 49'; Kopic 76'	Report

Doosan Arena, Plzeň
Attendance: 10,197
Referee: Ivan Bebek (Croatia)

7 December 2017
21:05

Hapoel Be'er Sheva (Israel)	0–2	(Czech Republic) Viktoria Plzeň
	Report	Hejda 28'; Hořava 83'

Turner Stadium, Be'er Sheva
Attendance: 10,542
Referee: Aleksandar Stavrev (Macedonia)
7 December 2017
21:05

FCSB (Romania)	1–2	(Switzerland) Lugano
Gnohéré 60'	Report	Daprelà 3'; Vécsei 32'

Arena Națională, Bucharest
Attendance: 13,231
Referee: Nikola Dabanović (Montenegro)

=== Group H ===
Pos	Team	Pld	W	D	L	GF	GA	GD	Pts	Qualification	ARS	ZVE	KLN	BATE
1	(England) Arsenal	6	4	1	1	14	4	+10	13	Advance to knockout phase	—	0–0	3–1	6–0
2	(Serbia) Red Star Belgrade	6	2	3	1	3	2	+1	9	Advance to knockout phase	0–1	—	1–0	1–1
3	(Germany) 1. FC Köln	6	2	0	4	7	8	−1	6		1–0	0–1	—	5–2
4	(Belarus) BATE Borisov	6	1	2	3	6	16	−10	5		2–4	0–0	1–0	—

Source: UEFA
Rules for classification: Group stage tiebreakers
14 September 2017
21:05

Red Star Belgrade (Serbia)	1–1	(Belarus) BATE Borisov
Radonjić 54'	Report	Signevich 72'

Red Star Stadium, Belgrade
Attendance: 40,284
Referee: Ievgenii Aranovskyi (Ukraine)
14 September 2017
22:05 (Note: The Arsenal v 1. FC Köln match, originally scheduled for 21:05 (20:05 UTC+1), was delayed to 22:05 (21:05 UTC+1) due to crowd safety concerns.)

Arsenal (England)	3–1	(Germany) 1. FC Köln
Kolašinac 49'; Sánchez 67'; Bellerín 82'	Report	Córdoba 9'

Emirates Stadium, London
Attendance: 59,359
Referee: Xavier Estrada Fernández (Spain)

28 September 2017
19:00

1. FC Köln (Germany)	0–1	(Serbia) Red Star Belgrade
	Report	Boakye 30'

RheinEnergieStadion, Cologne
Attendance: 45,300
Referee: Bas Nijhuis (Netherlands)
28 September 2017
19:00

BATE Borisov (Belarus)	2–4	(England) Arsenal
Ivanić 28'; Gordeichuk 67'	Report	Walcott 9', 22'; Holding 25'; Giroud 49' (pen.)

Borisov Arena, Barysaw
Attendance: 13,100
Referee: Daniel Stefański (Poland)

19 October 2017
19:00

BATE Borisov (Belarus)	1–0	(Germany) 1. FC Köln
Rios 55'	Report

Borisov Arena, Barysaw
Attendance: 11,783
Referee: Hüseyin Göçek (Turkey)
19 October 2017
19:00

Red Star Belgrade (Serbia)	0–1	(England) Arsenal
	Report	Giroud 85'

Red Star Stadium, Belgrade
Attendance: 50,327
Referee: Benoît Bastien (France)

2 November 2017
21:05

1. FC Köln (Germany)	5–2	(Belarus) BATE Borisov
Zoller 16'; Osako 54', 82'; Guirassy 63'; Jojić 90'	Report	Milunović 31'; Signevich 33'

RheinEnergieStadion, Cologne
Attendance: 45,200
Referee: Aleksandar Stavrev (Macedonia)
2 November 2017
21:05

Arsenal (England)	0–0	(Serbia) Red Star Belgrade
	Report

Emirates Stadium, London
Attendance: 58,285
Referee: Luca Banti (Italy)

23 November 2017
19:00

BATE Borisov (Belarus)	0–0	(Serbia) Red Star Belgrade
	Report

Borisov Arena, Barysaw
Attendance: 12,000
Referee: Svein Oddvar Moen (Norway)
23 November 2017
19:00

1. FC Köln (Germany)	1–0	(England) Arsenal
Guirassy 62' (pen.)	Report

RheinEnergieStadion, Cologne
Attendance: 45,300
Referee: Vladislav Bezborodov (Russia)

7 December 2017
21:05

Red Star Belgrade (Serbia)	1–0	(Germany) 1. FC Köln
Srnić 22'	Report

Red Star Stadium, Belgrade
Attendance: 51,364
Referee: Bobby Madden (Scotland)
7 December 2017
21:05

Arsenal (England)	6–0	(Belarus) BATE Borisov
Debuchy 11'; Walcott 37'; Wilshere 43'; Palyakow 51' (o.g.); Giroud 64' (pen.); Elneny 74'	Report

Emirates Stadium, London
Attendance: 25,909
Referee: Robert Schörgenhofer (Austria)

=== Group I ===
Pos	Team	Pld	W	D	L	GF	GA	GD	Pts	Qualification	SAL	MAR	KON	VSC
1	(Austria) Red Bull Salzburg	6	3	3	0	7	1	+6	12	Advance to knockout phase	—	1–0	0–0	3–0
2	(France) Marseille	6	2	2	2	4	4	0	8	Advance to knockout phase	0–0	—	1–0	2–1
3	(Turkey) Konyaspor	6	1	3	2	4	6	−2	6		0–2	1–1	—	2–1
4	(Portugal) Vitória de Guimarães	6	1	2	3	5	9	−4	5		1–1	1–0	1–1	—

Source: UEFA
Rules for classification: Group stage tiebreakers
14 September 2017
21:05

Marseille (France)	1–0	(Turkey) Konyaspor
Rami 48'	Report

Stade Vélodrome, Marseille
Attendance: 8,649
Referee: Gediminas Mažeika (Lithuania)
14 September 2017
21:05

Vitória de Guimarães (Portugal)	1–1	(Austria) Red Bull Salzburg
Pedro Henrique 25'	Report	V. Berisha 45'

Estádio D. Afonso Henriques, Guimarães
Attendance: 13,972
Referee: Əliyar Ağayev (Azerbaijan)

28 September 2017
19:00

Red Bull Salzburg (Austria)	1–0	(France) Marseille
Dabbur 73'	Report

Red Bull Arena, Wals-Siezenheim
Attendance: 11,832
Referee: Ivan Bebek (Croatia)
28 September 2017
19:00

Konyaspor (Turkey)	2–1	(Portugal) Vitória de Guimarães
Araz 24'; Milošević 48'	Report	Hurtado 74'

Büyükşehir Stadium, Konya
Attendance: 21,116
Referee: Aleksandar Stavrev (Macedonia)

19 October 2017
19:00

Konyaspor (Turkey)	0–2	(Austria) Red Bull Salzburg
	Report	Gulbrandsen 5'; Dabbur 80'

Büyükşehir Stadium, Konya
Attendance: 23,354
Referee: Craig Pawson (England)
19 October 2017
19:00

Marseille (France)	2–1	(Portugal) Vitória de Guimarães
Ocampos 28'; Lopez 76'	Report	Martins 17'

Stade Vélodrome, Marseille
Attendance: 13,359
Referee: Stefan Johannesson (Sweden)

2 November 2017
21:05

Red Bull Salzburg (Austria)	0–0	(Turkey) Konyaspor
	Report

Red Bull Arena, Wals-Siezenheim
Attendance: 8,773
Referee: Paolo Mazzoleni (Italy)
2 November 2017
21:05

Vitória de Guimarães (Portugal)	1–0	(France) Marseille
Hurtado 80'	Report

Estádio D. Afonso Henriques, Guimarães
Attendance: 14,181
Referee: Tamás Bognár (Hungary)

23 November 2017
19:00

Konyaspor (Turkey)	1–1	(France) Marseille
Skubic 82' (pen.)	Report	Moke 90+3' (o.g.)

Büyükşehir Stadium, Konya
Attendance: 18,000
Referee: Sergei Karasev (Russia)
23 November 2017
19:00

Red Bull Salzburg (Austria)	3–0	(Portugal) Vitória de Guimarães
Dabbur 26'; Ulmer 45+1'; Hwang Hee-chan 67'	Report

Red Bull Arena, Wals-Siezenheim
Attendance: 6,474
Referee: Andrew Dallas (Scotland)

7 December 2017
21:05

Marseille (France)	0–0	(Austria) Red Bull Salzburg
	Report

Stade Vélodrome, Marseille
Attendance: 23,865
Referee: Aleksei Kulbakov (Belarus)
7 December 2017
21:05

Vitória de Guimarães (Portugal)	1–1	(Turkey) Konyaspor
Turan 77' (o.g.)	Report	Bourabia 15'

Estádio D. Afonso Henriques, Guimarães
Attendance: 9,040
Referee: Daniel Siebert (Germany)

=== Group J ===
Pos	Team	Pld	W	D	L	GF	GA	GD	Pts	Qualification	ATH	OST	ZOR	HRT
1	(Spain) Athletic Bilbao	6	3	2	1	8	5	+3	11 (Note: Head-to-head results: Östersund 2–2 Athletic Bilbao, Athletic Bilbao 1–0 Östersund.)	Advance to knockout phase	—	1–0	0–1	3–2
2	(Sweden) Östersunds FK	6	3	2	1	8	4	+4	11	Advance to knockout phase	2–2	—	2–0	1–0
3	(Ukraine) Zorya Luhansk	6	2	0	4	3	9	−6	6		0–2	0–2	—	2–1
4	(Germany) Hertha BSC	6	1	2	3	6	7	−1	5		0–0	1–1	2–0	—

Source: UEFA
Rules for classification: Group stage tiebreakers
Notes:
14 September 2017
21:05

Zorya Luhansk (Ukraine)	0–2	(Sweden) Östersunds FK
	Report	Ghoddos 50'; Gero 90+4'

Arena Lviv, Lviv (Note: Zorya Luhansk played their home matches at Arena Lviv, lviv, instead of their regular stadium Avanhard Stadium, Luhansk, due to the war conditions in Eastern Ukraine.)
Attendance: 5,097
Referee: Stephan Klossner (Switzerland)
14 September 2017
21:05

Hertha BSC (Germany)	0–0	(Spain) Athletic Bilbao
	Report

Olympiastadion, Berlin
Attendance: 28,832
Referee: Ivan Kružliak (Slovakia)

28 September 2017
19:00

Athletic Bilbao (Spain)	0–1	(Ukraine) Zorya Luhansk
	Report	Kharatin 26'

San Mamés, Bilbao
Attendance: 32,462
Referee: Halis Özkahya (Turkey)
28 September 2017
19:00

Östersunds FK (Sweden)	1–0	(Germany) Hertha BSC
Nouri 22' (pen.)	Report

Jämtkraft Arena, Östersund
Attendance: 8,009
Referee: Luca Banti (Italy)

19 October 2017
19:00

Östersunds FK (Sweden)	2–2	(Spain) Athletic Bilbao
Gero 52'; Edwards 64'	Report	Aduriz 14'; Williams 89'

Jämtkraft Arena, Östersund
Attendance: 7,870
Referee: István Kovács (Romania)
19 October 2017
19:00

Zorya Luhansk (Ukraine)	2–1	(Germany) Hertha BSC
Silas 42'; Svatok 79'	Report	Selke 56'

Arena Lviv, Lviv
Attendance: 9,521
Referee: Liran Liany (Israel)

2 November 2017
21:05

Athletic Bilbao (Spain)	1–0	(Sweden) Östersunds FK
Aduriz 70'	Report

San Mamés, Bilbao
Attendance: 32,354
Referee: Paweł Gil (Poland)
2 November 2017
21:05

Hertha BSC (Germany)	2–0	(Ukraine) Zorya Luhansk
Selke 16', 73'	Report

Olympiastadion, Berlin
Attendance: 20,358
Referee: John Beaton (Scotland)

23 November 2017
19:00

Östersunds FK (Sweden)	2–0	(Ukraine) Zorya Luhansk
Hrechyshkin 40' (o.g.); Ghoddos 77'	Report

Jämtkraft Arena, Östersund
Attendance: 7,754
Referee: Kevin Blom (Netherlands)
23 November 2017
19:00

Athletic Bilbao (Spain)	3–2	(Germany) Hertha BSC
Aduriz 35' (pen.), 66' (pen.); Williams 82'	Report	Leckie 26'; Selke 36'

San Mamés, Bilbao
Attendance: 38,928
Referee: Paolo Tagliavento (Italy)

7 December 2017
21:05

Zorya Luhansk (Ukraine)	0–2	(Spain) Athletic Bilbao
	Report	Aduriz 70'; García 86'

Arena Lviv, Lviv
Attendance: 8,428
Referee: Ruddy Buquet (France)
7 December 2017
21:05

Hertha BSC (Germany)	1–1	(Sweden) Östersunds FK
Pekarík 61'	Report	Papagiannopoulos 58'

Olympiastadion, Berlin
Attendance: 15,686
Referee: Tiago Martins (Portugal)

=== Group K ===
Pos	Team	Pld	W	D	L	GF	GA	GD	Pts	Qualification	LAZ	NCE	ZUL	VIT
1	(Italy) Lazio	6	4	1	1	12	7	+5	13	Advance to knockout phase	—	1–0	2–0	1–1
2	(France) Nice	6	3	0	3	12	7	+5	9	Advance to knockout phase	1–3	—	3–1	3–0
3	(Belgium) Zulte Waregem	6	2	1	3	8	13	−5	7		3–2	1–5	—	1–1
4	(Netherlands) Vitesse	6	1	2	3	5	10	−5	5		2–3	1–0	0–2	—

Source: UEFA
Rules for classification: Group stage tiebreakers
14 September 2017
21:05

Zulte Waregem (Belgium)	1–5	(France) Nice
Leya Iseka 46'	Report	Pléa 16', 20'; Dante 28'; Saint-Maximin 69'; Balotelli 74'

Regenboogstadion, Waregem
Attendance: 9,072
Referee: Ali Palabıyık (Turkey)
14 September 2017
21:05

Vitesse (Netherlands)	2–3	(Italy) Lazio
Matavž 33'; Linssen 57'	Report	Parolo 51'; Immobile 67'; Murgia 75'

GelreDome, Arnhem
Attendance: 19,867
Referee: Liran Liany (Israel)

28 September 2017
19:00

Lazio (Italy)	2–0	(Belgium) Zulte Waregem
Caicedo 18'; Immobile 90'	Report

Stadio Olimpico, Rome
Attendance: 300 (Note: The Lazio v Zulte Waregem match was played behind closed doors due to punishment by UEFA.)
Referee: Harald Lechner (Austria)
28 September 2017
19:00

Nice (France)	3–0	(Netherlands) Vitesse
Pléa 16', 82'; Saint-Maximin 45'	Report

Allianz Riviera, Nice
Attendance: 15,006
Referee: Aleksei Eskov (Russia)

19 October 2017
19:00

Nice (France)	1–3	(Italy) Lazio
Balotelli 4'	Report	Caicedo 5'; Milinković-Savić 65', 89'

Allianz Riviera, Nice
Attendance: 21,386
Referee: Craig Thomson (Scotland)
19 October 2017
19:00

Zulte Waregem (Belgium)	1–1	(Netherlands) Vitesse
Kashia 23' (o.g.)	Report	Bruns 27'

Regenboogstadion, Waregem
Attendance: 9,488
Referee: Ivan Bebek (Croatia)

2 November 2017
21:05

Lazio (Italy)	1–0	(France) Nice
Le Marchand 90+2' (o.g.)	Report

Stadio Olimpico, Rome
Attendance: 21,327
Referee: Jesús Gil Manzano (Spain)
2 November 2017
21:05

Vitesse (Netherlands)	0–2	(Belgium) Zulte Waregem
	Report	Dabo 3' (o.g.); Kaya 70'

GelreDome, Arnhem
Attendance: 17,906
Referee: Ievgenii Aranovskyi (Ukraine)

23 November 2017
19:00

Nice (France)	3–1	(Belgium) Zulte Waregem
Balotelli 5' (pen.), 31'; Tameze 86'	Report	Hämäläinen 81'

Allianz Riviera, Nice
Attendance: 20,274
Referee: Luca Banti (Italy)
23 November 2017
19:00

Lazio (Italy)	1–1	(Netherlands) Vitesse
Luis Alberto 42'	Report	Linssen 13'

Stadio Olimpico, Rome
Attendance: 8,226
Referee: Ali Palabıyık (Turkey)

7 December 2017
21:05

Zulte Waregem (Belgium)	3–2	(Italy) Lazio
De Pauw 6'; Heylen 60'; Leya Iseka 83'	Report	Caicedo 67'; Lucas 76'

Regenboogstadion, Waregem
Attendance: 8,845
Referee: Charalambos Kalogeropoulos (Greece)
7 December 2017
21:05

Vitesse (Netherlands)	1–0	(France) Nice
Castaignos 84'	Report

GelreDome, Arnhem
Attendance: 17,564
Referee: Sandro Schärer (Switzerland)

=== Group L ===
Pos	Team	Pld	W	D	L	GF	GA	GD	Pts	Qualification	ZEN	RS	ROS	VRD
1	(Russia) Zenit Saint Petersburg	6	5	1	0	17	5	+12	16	Advance to knockout phase	—	3–1	3–1	2–1
2	(Spain) Real Sociedad	6	4	0	2	16	6	+10	12	Advance to knockout phase	1–3	—	4–0	3–0
3	(Norway) Rosenborg	6	1	2	3	6	11	−5	5		1–1	0–1	—	3–1
4	(North Macedonia) Vardar	6	0	1	5	3	20	−17	1		0–5	0–6	1–1	—

Source: UEFA
Rules for classification: Group stage tiebreakers
14 September 2017
21:05

Vardar (North Macedonia)	0–5	(Russia) Zenit Saint Petersburg
	Report	Kokorin 6', 21'; Dzyuba 39'; Ivanović 66'; Rigoni 89'

Philip II Arena, Skopje
Attendance: 11,118
Referee: Jakob Kehlet (Denmark)
14 September 2017
21:05

Real Sociedad (Spain)	4–0	(Norway) Rosenborg
Llorente 9', 77'; Zurutuza 10'; Skjelvik 41' (o.g.)	Report

Anoeta, San Sebastián
Attendance: 21,479
Referee: Paolo Mazzoleni (Italy)

28 September 2017
19:00

Rosenborg (Norway)	3–1	(North Macedonia) Vardar
Bendtner 25' (pen.); A. Konradsen 56'; Hedenstad 68'	Report	Juan Felipe 90+1'

Lerkendal Stadion, Trondheim
Attendance: 16,038
Referee: Georgi Kabakov (Bulgaria)
28 September 2017
19:00

Zenit Saint Petersburg (Russia)	3–1	(Spain) Real Sociedad
Rigoni 5'; Kokorin 24', 60'	Report	Llorente 41'

Krestovsky Stadium, Saint Petersburg
Attendance: 50,487
Referee: Andre Marriner (England)

19 October 2017
19:00

Zenit Saint Petersburg (Russia)	3–1	(Norway) Rosenborg
Rigoni 1', 68', 75'	Report	Helland 88'

Krestovsky Stadium, Saint Petersburg
Attendance: 46,211
Referee: Tobias Stieler (Germany)
19 October 2017
19:00

Vardar (North Macedonia)	0–6	(Spain) Real Sociedad
	Report	Oyarzabal 12'; Willian José 34', 42', 55', 59'; De la Bella 90'

Philip II Arena, Skopje
Attendance: 20,368
Referee: Aliyar Aghayev (Azerbaijan)

2 November 2017
21:05

Rosenborg (Norway)	1–1	(Russia) Zenit Saint Petersburg
Bendtner 55' (pen.)	Report	Kokorin 90+3'

Lerkendal Stadion, Trondheim
Attendance: 18,597
Referee: Serdar Gözübüyük (Netherlands)
2 November 2017
21:05

Real Sociedad (Spain)	3–0	(North Macedonia) Vardar
Juanmi 31'; De la Bella 69'; Bautista 81'	Report

Anoeta, San Sebastián
Attendance: 17,242
Referee: Robert Schörgenhofer (Austria)

23 November 2017
19:00

Zenit Saint Petersburg (Russia)	2–1	(North Macedonia) Vardar
Poloz 16'; Rigoni 43'	Report	Blazhevski 90+3'

Krestovsky Stadium, Saint Petersburg
Attendance: 38,196
Referee: Bart Vertenten (Belgium)
23 November 2017
19:00

Rosenborg (Norway)	0–1	(Spain) Real Sociedad
	Report	Oyarzabal 90'

Lerkendal Stadion, Trondheim
Attendance: 18,307
Referee: Daniel Stefański (Poland)

7 December 2017
21:05

Vardar (North Macedonia)	1–1	(Norway) Rosenborg
Ytalo 9'	Report	Bendtner 45+2' (pen.)

Philip II Arena, Skopje
Attendance: 7,839
Referee: Serhiy Boyko (Ukraine)
7 December 2017
21:05

Real Sociedad (Spain)	1–3	(Russia) Zenit Saint Petersburg
Willian José 58'	Report	Yerokhin 35'; Ivanović 64'; Paredes 85'

Anoeta, San Sebastián
Attendance: 20,609
Referee: Liran Liany (Israel)
