= Thomas Sørensen (footballer, born 1984) =

Danish footballer (born 1984)

Personal information
- Full name: Thomas Sørensen
- Date of birth: 1 August 1984 (age 42)
- Place of birth: Copenhagen, Denmark
- Height: 1.86 m (6 ft 1 in)
- Position: Defender

Senior career*
Years	Team	Apps	(Gls)
2002–2005	Lyngby BK	41	(0)
2005	Brønshøj BK	0	(0)
2005	Husum BK	?	(?)
2005–2008	Ølstykke FC	?	(?)
2008–2009	Herfølge BK	1	(0)
2009–2012	HB Køge	89	(2)
2012–2013	AB	24	(0)
2013–2014	ÍA Akranes	10	(0)
2014–2018	Lyngby BK	96	(2)
2018	Hvidovre IF	7	(0)
- * Club domestic league appearances and goals

Thomas Sørensen (born 1 August 1984) is a Danish retired professional association football player. He played as a defender. He has previously represented in the Danish Superliga.
