= 2017–18 UEFA Champions League qualifying =

European football tournament

2017–18 UEFA Champions League qualifying was the preliminary phase of the 2017–18 UEFA Champions League, prior to the competition proper. Qualification consisted of the qualifying phase (first to third rounds) and the play-off round. It began on 27 June and ended on 23 August 2017. A total of 57 teams competed in the qualifying phase and play-off round to decide 10 of the 32 places in the group stage.

All times were CEST (UTC+2).

== Round and draw dates ==
The schedule of the qualifying phase and play-off round was as follows (all draws were held at the UEFA headquarters in Nyon, Switzerland).

Round	Draw	First leg	Second leg
First qualifying round	19 June 2017	27–28 June 2017	4–5 July 2017
Second qualifying round	19 June 2017	11–12 July 2017	18–19 July 2017
Third qualifying round	14 July 2017	25–26 July 2017	1–2 August 2017
Play-off round	4 August 2017	15–16 August 2017	22–23 August 2017

== Format ==
In the qualifying phase and play-off round, each tie was played over two legs, with each team playing one leg at home. The team that scored more goals on aggregate over the two legs advanced to the next round. If the aggregate score was level, the away goals rule was applied, i.e. the team that scored more goals away from home over the two legs advanced. If away goals were also equal, then 30 minutes of extra time were played. The away goals rule was again applied after extra time, i.e. if there were goals scored during extra time and the aggregate score was still level, the visiting team advanced by virtue of more away goals scored. If no goals were scored during extra time, the tie was decided by a penalty shoot-out.

In the draws for each round, teams were seeded based on their UEFA club coefficients at the beginning of the season, with the teams divided into seeded and unseeded pots. A seeded team was drawn against an unseeded team, with the order of legs in each tie decided by draw. Due to the limited time between matches, the draws for the second and third qualifying rounds took place before the results of the previous round were known. For these draws (or in any cases where the result of a tie in the previous round was not known at the time of the draw), the seeding was carried out under the assumption that the team with the higher coefficient of an undecided tie advanced to this round, which means if the team with the lower coefficient was to advance, it simply took the seeding of its defeated opponent. Prior to the draws, UEFA could form "groups" in accordance with the principles set by the Club Competitions Committee, but they were purely for convenience of the draw and for ensuring that teams from the same association (or associations with political conflicts) were not drawn against each other, and did not resemble any real groupings in the sense of the competition.

== Teams ==
There were two routes which the teams were separated into during qualifying:

- Champions Route, which included all domestic champions which did not qualify directly for the group stage.
- League Route (also called the Non-champions Path or the Best-placed Path), which included all domestic non-champions which did not qualify directly for the group stage.

A total of 57 teams (42 in Champions Route, 15 in League Route) were involved in the qualifying phase and play-off round. The 10 winners of the play-off round (5 in Champions Route, 5 in League Route) advanced to the group stage to join the 22 teams which entered in the group stage. The 15 losers of the third qualifying round entered the Europa League play-off round, and the 10 losers of the play-off round entered the Europa League group stage.

Below were the participating teams (with their 2017 UEFA club coefficients), grouped by their starting rounds.

Key to colours
Winners of the play-off round advance to the group stage
Losers of the play-off round enter the Europa League group stage
Losers of the third qualifying round enter the Europa League play-off round

=== Champions Route ===
Third qualifying round
Team	Coeff.
(Greece) Olympiacos	64.580
(Czech Republic) Slavia Prague	8.135
(Romania) Viitorul Constanța	5.870

Second qualifying round
Team	Coeff.
(Scotland) Celtic	42.785
(Austria) Red Bull Salzburg	40.570
(Denmark) Copenhagen	37.800
(Bulgaria) Ludogorets Razgrad	34.175
(Belarus) BATE Borisov	29.475
(Poland) Legia Warsaw	28.450
(Cyprus) APOEL	26.210
(Slovenia) Maribor	21.125
(Azerbaijan) Qarabağ	18.050
(Sweden) Malmö FF	16.945
(Kazakhstan) Astana	16.800
(Serbia) Partizan	16.075
(Croatia) Rijeka	15.550
(Norway) Rosenborg	12.665
(Moldova) Sheriff Tiraspol	11.150
(Israel) Hapoel Be'er Sheva	10.875
(Iceland) FH	6.175
(Slovakia) Žilina	5.850
(Lithuania) Žalgiris	5.825
(Republic of Ireland) Dundalk	5.815
(North Macedonia) Vardar	5.125
(Luxembourg) F91 Dudelange	4.975
(Albania) Kukësi	4.575
(Bosnia and Herzegovina) Zrinjski Mostar	4.050
(Montenegro) Budućnost Podgorica	3.300
(Hungary) Honvéd	2.900
(Finland) Mariehamn	2.030
(Latvia) Spartaks Jūrmala	1.975
(Georgia (country)) Samtredia	1.525

First qualifying round
Team	Coeff.
(Wales) The New Saints	5.775
(Northern Ireland) Linfield	3.650
(Faroe Islands) Víkingur Gøta	2.950
(Malta) Hibernians	2.800
(Andorra) FC Santa Coloma	2.733
(Armenia) Alashkert	2.525
(San Marino) La Fiorita	1.566
(Gibraltar) Europa	1.500
(Estonia) FCI Tallinn	1.300
(Kosovo) Trepça '89	0.000

=== League Route ===
Play-off round
Team	Coeff.
(Spain) Sevilla	112.999
(Italy) Napoli	88.666
(England) Liverpool	56.192
(Portugal) Sporting CP	36.866
(Germany) TSG Hoffenheim	15.899

Third qualifying round
Team	Coeff.
(Ukraine) Dynamo Kyiv	67.526
(Netherlands) Ajax	67.212
(Czech Republic) Viktoria Plzeň	40.635
(Russia) CSKA Moscow	39.606
(Belgium) Club Brugge	39.480
(Romania) FCSB	35.370
(Switzerland) Young Boys	28.915
(France) Nice	16.833
(Turkey) İstanbul Başakşehir	10.340
(Greece) AEK Athens	6.580

== First qualifying round ==
The draw for the first qualifying round was held on 19 June 2017, 12:00 CEST. Times are CEST, as listed by UEFA (local times, if different, are in parentheses).

=== Seeding ===
A total of ten teams played in the first qualifying round.

Seeded	Unseeded
(Wales) The New Saints (Northern Ireland) Linfield (Faroe Islands) Víkingur Gøta (Malta) Hibernians (Andorra) FC Santa Coloma	(Armenia) Alashkert (San Marino) La Fiorita (Gibraltar) Europa (Estonia) FCI Tallinn (Kosovo) Trepça '89

=== Summary ===
The first legs were played on 27 and 28 June, and the second legs were played on 4 July 2017.

Team 1	Agg.	Team 2	1st leg	2nd leg
Víkingur Gøta (Faroe Islands)	6–2	(Kosovo) Trepça '89	2–1	4–1
Hibernians (Malta)	3–0	(Estonia) FCI Tallinn	2–0	1–0
Alashkert (Armenia)	2–1	(Andorra) FC Santa Coloma	1–0	1–1
The New Saints (Wales)	4–3	(Gibraltar) Europa	1–2	3–1 (a.e.t.)
Linfield (Northern Ireland)	1–0	(San Marino) La Fiorita	1–0	0–0

=== Matches ===
27 June 2017
20:00 (19:00 UTC+1)

Víkingur Gøta (Faroe Islands)	2–1	(Kosovo) Trepça '89
G. Vatnhamar 17'; Lawal 73'	Report	Hajdari 39'

Tórsvøllur, Tórshavn (Note: Víkingur Gøta played their home matches at Tórsvøllur, Tórshavn, instead of their regular stadium Sarpugerði, Norðragøta.)
Attendance: 841
Referee: Juri Frischer (Estonia)
4 July 2017
18:00

Trepça '89 (Kosovo)	1–4	(Faroe Islands) Víkingur Gøta
Hasani 65'	Report	Anghel 37'; Islami 40' (o.g.); S. Vatnhamar 52', 59'

Adem Jashari Olympic Stadium, Mitrovica (Note: Trepça '89 played their home match at Adem Jashari Olympic Stadium, Mitrovica, instead of their regular stadium Riza Lushta Stadium, Mitrovica.)
Attendance: 12,000
Referee: Alexander Harkam (Austria)

Víkingur Gøta won 6–2 on aggregate.

27 June 2017
20:00

Hibernians (Malta)	2–0	(Estonia) FCI Tallinn
Jorginho 63'; Kristensen 73'	Report

Hibernians Stadium, Paola
Attendance: 1,068
Referee: Fedayi San (Switzerland)
4 July 2017
18:00 (19:00 UTC+3)

FCI Tallinn (Estonia)	0–1	(Malta) Hibernians
	Report	Jorginho 88'

A. Le Coq Arena, Tallinn (Note: FCI Tallinn played their home match at A. Le Coq Arena, Tallinn, instead of their regular stadium Lasnamäe KJH Stadium, Tallinn.)
Attendance: 995
Referee: Alex Troleis (Faroe Islands)

Hibernians won 3–0 on aggregate.

27 June 2017
18:00 (20:00 UTC+4)

Alashkert (Armenia)	1–0	(Andorra) FC Santa Coloma
Nenadović 39'	Report

Vazgen Sargsyan Republican Stadium, Yerevan (Note: Alashkert played their home matches at Vazgen Sargsyan Republican Stadium, Yerevan, instead of their regular stadium Alashkert Stadium, Yerevan.)
Attendance: 3,300
Referee: Stefan Apostolov (Bulgaria)
4 July 2017
20:30

FC Santa Coloma (Andorra)	1–1	(Armenia) Alashkert
Lima 63'	Report	Nenadović 28'

Estadi Comunal, Andorra la Vella
Attendance: 850
Referee: Sven Bindels (Luxembourg)

Alashkert won 2–1 on aggregate.

27 June 2017
20:00 (19:00 UTC+1)

The New Saints (Wales)	1–2	(Gibraltar) Europa
Quigley 44'	Report	Quillo 8'; Gómez 78'

Park Hall, Oswestry
Attendance: 1,148
Referee: Luca Barbeno (San Marino)
4 July 2017
19:30

Europa (Gibraltar)	1–3 (a.e.t.)	(Wales) The New Saints
Walker 53' (pen.)	Report	Moya 37' (o.g.); Quigley 41', 104'

Estádio Algarve, Faro–Loulé, Portugal (Note: Europa played their home match at Estádio Algarve, Faro–Loulé, Portugal, instead of their regular stadium Victoria Stadium, Gibraltar.)
Attendance: 261
Referee: Lawrence Visser (Belgium)

The New Saints won 4–3 on aggregate.

28 June 2017
20:45 (19:45 UTC+1)

Linfield (Northern Ireland)	1–0	(San Marino) La Fiorita
J. Stewart 89'	Report

Windsor Park, Belfast
Attendance: 2,839
Referee: Duje Strukan (Croatia)
4 July 2017
20:30

La Fiorita (San Marino)	0–0	(Northern Ireland) Linfield
	Report

San Marino Stadium, Serravalle
Attendance: 911
Referee: Fyodor Zammit (Malta)

Linfield won 1–0 on aggregate.

== Second qualifying round ==
The draw for the second qualifying round was held on 19 June 2017, 12:00 CEST (after the completion of the first qualifying round draw). Times are CEST, as listed by UEFA (local times, if different, are in parentheses).

=== Seeding ===
A total of 34 teams played in the second qualifying round: 29 teams which entered in this round, and the five winners of the first qualifying round. Since the draw for the second qualifying round took place before the results of the previous round were known, the seeding was carried out under the assumption that the team with the higher coefficient of an undecided tie would advance to this round, which meant if the team with the lower coefficient was to advance, it simply took the seeding of its defeated opponent.

Group 1		Group 2		Group 3	
Seeded	Unseeded	Seeded	Unseeded	Seeded	Unseeded
(Austria) Red Bull Salzburg (Bulgaria) Ludogorets Razgrad (Cyprus) APOEL (Azerbaijan) Qarabağ (Serbia) Partizan	(Lithuania) Žalgiris (Luxembourg) F91 Dudelange (Montenegro) Budućnost Podgorica (Malta) Hibernians (Georgia (country)) Samtredia	(Denmark) Copenhagen (Belarus) BATE Borisov (Kazakhstan) Astana (Croatia) Rijeka (Moldova) Sheriff Tiraspol (Israel) Hapoel Be'er Sheva	(Slovakia) Žilina (Wales) The New Saints (Albania) Kukësi (Hungary) Honvéd (Armenia) Alashkert (Latvia) Spartaks Jūrmala	(Scotland) Celtic (Poland) Legia Warsaw (Slovenia) Maribor (Sweden) Malmö FF (Norway) Rosenborg (Iceland) FH	(Republic of Ireland) Dundalk (North Macedonia) Vardar (Bosnia and Herzegovina) Zrinjski Mostar (Northern Ireland) Linfield (Faroe Islands) Víkingur Gøta (Finland) Mariehamn

Notes

1. ^{†} Winners of the first qualifying round whose identity was not known at the time of the draw. Teams in italics defeated a team with a higher coefficient in the first qualifying round, thus effectively taking the coefficient of their defeated opponent in the draw for the second qualifying round.

=== Summary ===
The first legs were played on 11, 12 and 14 July, and the second legs were played on 18 and 19 July 2017.

Team 1	Agg.	Team 2	1st leg	2nd leg
APOEL (Cyprus)	2–0	(Luxembourg) F91 Dudelange	1–0	1–0
Žalgiris (Lithuania)	3–5	(Bulgaria) Ludogorets Razgrad	2–1	1–4
Qarabağ (Azerbaijan)	6–0	(Georgia (country)) Samtredia	5–0	1–0
Partizan (Serbia)	2–0	(Montenegro) Budućnost Podgorica	2–0	0–0
Hibernians (Malta)	0–6	(Austria) Red Bull Salzburg	0–3	0–3
Sheriff Tiraspol (Moldova)	2–2 (a)	(Albania) Kukësi	1–0	1–2
Spartaks Jūrmala (Latvia)	1–2 (Note: Order of legs reversed after original draw.)	(Kazakhstan) Astana	0–1	1–1
BATE Borisov (Belarus)	4–2	(Armenia) Alashkert	1–1	3–1
Žilina (Slovakia)	3–4	(Denmark) Copenhagen	1–3	2–1
Hapoel Be'er Sheva (Israel)	5–3	(Hungary) Honvéd	2–1	3–2
Rijeka (Croatia)	7–1	(Wales) The New Saints	2–0	5–1
Malmö FF (Sweden)	2–4	(North Macedonia) Vardar	1–1	1–3
Zrinjski Mostar (Bosnia and Herzegovina)	2–3	(Slovenia) Maribor	1–2	1–1
Dundalk (Republic of Ireland)	2–3	(Norway) Rosenborg	1–1	1–2 (a.e.t.)
FH (Iceland)	3–1	(Faroe Islands) Víkingur Gøta	1–1	2–0
Linfield (Northern Ireland)	0–6	(Scotland) Celtic	0–2	0–4
Mariehamn (Finland)	0–9	(Poland) Legia Warsaw	0–3	0–6

=== Matches ===
12 July 2017
19:00 (20:00 UTC+3)

APOEL (Cyprus)	1–0	(Luxembourg) F91 Dudelange
Bertoglio 71'	Report

GSP Stadium, Nicosia
Attendance: 9,600
Referee: Alan Mario Sant (Malta)
19 July 2017
18:00

F91 Dudelange (Luxembourg)	0–1	(Cyprus) APOEL
	Report	De Camargo 40' (pen.)

Stade Jos Nosbaum, Dudelange
Attendance: 1,458
Referee: Nikola Dabanović (Montenegro)

APOEL won 2–0 on aggregate.

12 July 2017
20:00 (21:00 UTC+3)

Žalgiris (Lithuania)	2–1	(Bulgaria) Ludogorets Razgrad
Nyuiadzi 78'; Kuklys 86'	Report	Abel 18'

LFF Stadium, Vilnius
Attendance: 4,911
Referee: Manuel Schüttengruber (Austria)
19 July 2017
20:00 (21:00 UTC+3)

Ludogorets Razgrad (Bulgaria)	4–1	(Lithuania) Žalgiris
Natanael 41'; Wanderson 55'; Keșerü 56', 74'	Report	Nyuiadzi 15'

Ludogorets Arena, Razgrad
Attendance: 4,739
Referee: Mads-Kristoffer Kristoffersen (Denmark)

Ludogorets Razgrad won 5–3 on aggregate.

11 July 2017
19:00 (21:00 UTC+4)

Qarabağ (Azerbaijan)	5–0	(Georgia (country)) Samtredia
Ismayilov 10' (pen.); Ndlovu 37', 45+1' (pen.); Guerrier 83'; Míchel 90+2'	Report

Tofiq Bahramov Republican Stadium, Baku (Note: Qarabağ played their home matches at Tofiq Bahramov Republican Stadium, Baku, instead of their regular stadium Azersun Arena, Baku.)
Attendance: 21,500
Referee: Mete Kalkavan (Turkey)
18 July 2017
19:00 (21:00 UTC+4)

Samtredia (Georgia (country))	0–1	(Azerbaijan) Qarabağ
	Report	Guerrier 22'

Boris Paichadze Dinamo Arena, Tbilisi (Note: Samtredia played their home match at Boris Paichadze Dinamo Arena, Tbilisi, instead of their regular stadium Erosi Manjgaladze Stadium, Samtredia.)
Attendance: 1,835
Referee: Srđan Jovanović (Serbia)

Qarabağ won 6–0 on aggregate.

11 July 2017
20:45

Partizan (Serbia)	2–0	(Montenegro) Budućnost Podgorica
Đurđević 53' (pen.); Leonardo 63'	Report

Partizan Stadium, Belgrade
Attendance: 20,530
Referee: Pol van Boekel (Netherlands)
18 July 2017
20:45

Budućnost Podgorica (Montenegro)	0–0	(Serbia) Partizan
	Report

City Stadium, Podgorica
Attendance: 9,153
Referee: Roi Reinshreiber (Israel)

Partizan won 2–0 on aggregate.

11 July 2017
20:30

Hibernians (Malta)	0–3	(Austria) Red Bull Salzburg
	Report	Berisha 32' (pen.); Hwang Hee-chan 35'; Minamino 54'

Hibernians Stadium, Paola
Attendance: 1,452
Referee: Fran Jović (Croatia)
19 July 2017
20:30

Red Bull Salzburg (Austria)	3–0	(Malta) Hibernians
Rzatkowski 11'; Guldbrandsen 19'; Haidara 85'	Report

Red Bull Arena, Wals-Siezenheim
Attendance: 5,511
Referee: Sergey Lapochkin (Russia)

Red Bull Salzburg won 6–0 on aggregate.

12 July 2017
19:00 (20:00 UTC+3)

Sheriff Tiraspol (Moldova)	1–0	(Albania) Kukësi
Badibanga 79' (pen.)	Report

Sheriff Stadium, Tiraspol
Attendance: 5,772
Referee: Christos Nicolaides (Cyprus)
19 July 2017
19:30

Kukësi (Albania)	2–1	(Moldova) Sheriff Tiraspol
Emini 35'; Pejić 45+1'	Report	Bayala 56'

Elbasan Arena, Elbasan (Note: Kukësi played their home match at Elbasan Arena, Elbasan, instead of their regular stadium Zeqir Ymeri Stadium, Kukës.)
Attendance: 1,417
Referee: Irfan Peljto (Bosnia and Herzegovina)

2–2 on aggregate; Sheriff Tiraspol won on away goals.

12 July 2017
18:00 (19:00 UTC+3)

Spartaks Jūrmala (Latvia)	0–1	(Kazakhstan) Astana
	Report	Twumasi 73'

Slokas Stadium, Jūrmala
Attendance: 1,987
Referee: Neil Doyle (Republic of Ireland)
18 July 2017
16:00 (20:00 UTC+6)

Astana (Kazakhstan)	1–1	(Latvia) Spartaks Jūrmala
Twumasi 59'	Report	Vardanjans 72'

Astana Arena, Astana
Attendance: 20,500
Referee: Charalambos Kalogeropoulos (Greece)

Astana won 2–1 on aggregate.

12 July 2017
19:30 (20:30 UTC+3)

BATE Borisov (Belarus)	1–1	(Armenia) Alashkert
Rios 43'	Report	Rios 78' (o.g.)

Borisov Arena, Barysaw
Attendance: 11,192
Referee: Enea Jorgji (Albania)
18 July 2017
18:00 (20:00 UTC+4)

Alashkert (Armenia)	1–3	(Belarus) BATE Borisov
Nenadović 18'	Report	Gordeichuk 23', 35'; M. Valadzko 78'

Vazgen Sargsyan Republican Stadium, Yerevan
Attendance: 10,000
Referee: Peter Kralović (Slovakia)

BATE Borisov won 4–2 on aggregate.

12 July 2017
20:15

Žilina (Slovakia)	1–3	(Denmark) Copenhagen
Špalek 39'	Report	Pavlović 68', 73', 83'

Štadión pod Dubňom, Žilina
Attendance: 10,023
Referee: Benoît Millot (France)
19 July 2017
19:30

Copenhagen (Denmark)	1–2	(Slovakia) Žilina
Verbič 48' (pen.)	Report	Otubanjo 19'; Kaša 57'

Parken Stadium, Copenhagen
Attendance: 9,140
Referee: Jonathan Lardot (Belgium)

Copenhagen won 4–3 on aggregate.

12 July 2017
19:00 (20:00 UTC+3)

Hapoel Be'er Sheva (Israel)	2–1	(Hungary) Honvéd
Vítor 35'; Einbinder 52'	Report	Lanzafame 63'

Turner Stadium, Be'er Sheva
Attendance: 15,603
Referee: Andreas Ekberg (Sweden)
19 July 2017
21:15

Honvéd (Hungary)	2–3	(Israel) Hapoel Be'er Sheva
Lanzafame 45+2' (pen.); Baráth 73'	Report	Ogu 12'; Nwakaeme 16', 84'

Bozsik József Stadion, Budapest
Attendance: 200
Referee: Davide Massa (Italy)

Hapoel Be'er Sheva won 5–3 on aggregate.

11 July 2017
20:45

Rijeka (Croatia)	2–0	(Wales) The New Saints
Mišić 4'; Matei 69'	Report

Stadion Rujevica, Rijeka
Attendance: 5,883
Referee: Kristo Tohver (Estonia)
18 July 2017
20:00 (19:00 UTC+1)

The New Saints (Wales)	1–5	(Croatia) Rijeka
Cieślewicz 69'	Report	Matei 41'; Gavranović 54', 79'; Gorgon 61'; Ristovski 64'

Park Hall, Oswestry
Attendance: 1,150
Referee: Georgi Kabakov (Bulgaria)

Rijeka won 7–1 on aggregate.

12 July 2017
19:00

Malmö FF (Sweden)	1–1	(North Macedonia) Vardar
Brorsson 75'	Report	Nikolov 63'

Swedbank Stadion, Malmö
Attendance: 20,058
Referee: Þorvaldur Árnason (Iceland)
18 July 2017
18:00

Vardar (North Macedonia)	3–1	(Sweden) Malmö FF
Grncharov 55'; Barseghyan 61'; Nikolov 90+1'	Report	Rosenberg 16' (pen.)

Stadion Mladost, Strumica (Note: Vardar played their second qualifying round home match at Stadion Mladost, Strumica, instead of their regular stadium Philip II Arena, Skopje, which was unavailable due to preparation for the 2017 UEFA Super Cup.)
Attendance: 2,800
Referee: Anatoliy Zhabchenko (Ukraine)

Vardar won 4–2 on aggregate.

12 July 2017
19:00

Zrinjski Mostar (Bosnia and Herzegovina)	1–2	(Slovenia) Maribor
Todorović 89'	Report	Zahović 43'; Tavares 90+4' (pen.)

Stadion pod Bijelim Brijegom, Mostar
Attendance: 7,000
Referee: Daniel Siebert (Germany)
19 July 2017
20:15

Maribor (Slovenia)	1–1	(Bosnia and Herzegovina) Zrinjski Mostar
Viler 27'	Report	Todorović 7'

Ljudski vrt, Maribor
Attendance: 9,266
Referee: Ola Hobber Nilsen (Norway)

Maribor won 3–2 on aggregate.

12 July 2017
20:45 (19:45 UTC+1)

Dundalk (Republic of Ireland)	1–1	(Norway) Rosenborg
McMillan 18'	Report	Reginiussen 44'

Oriel Park, Dundalk
Attendance: 3,050
Referee: Radu Petrescu (Romania)
19 July 2017
19:15

Rosenborg (Norway)	2–1 (a.e.t.)	(Republic of Ireland) Dundalk
De Lanlay 43'; Vilhjálmsson 98'	Report	Gartland 12'

Lerkendal Stadion, Trondheim
Attendance: 14,817
Referee: Aliyar Aghayev (Azerbaijan)

Rosenborg won 3–2 on aggregate.

12 July 2017
21:15 (19:15 UTC+0)

FH (Iceland)	1–1	(Faroe Islands) Víkingur Gøta
Pálsson 49'	Report	Lawal 73' (pen.)

Kaplakriki, Hafnarfjörður
Attendance: 1,523
Referee: Petr Ardeleanu (Czech Republic)
18 July 2017
20:00 (19:00 UTC+1)

Víkingur Gøta (Faroe Islands)	0–2	(Iceland) FH
	Report	Lennon 79' (pen.); Valdimarsson 90+1'

Tórsvøllur, Tórshavn
Attendance: 3,043
Referee: Ville Nevalainen (Finland)

FH won 3–1 on aggregate.

14 July 2017 (Note: The Linfield v Celtic match was moved to 14 July due to the original dates of 11 and 12 July coinciding with the Twelfth in Northern Ireland.)
18:00 (17:00 UTC+1)

Linfield (Northern Ireland)	0–2	(Scotland) Celtic
	Report	Haughey 17' (o.g.); Rogic 23'

Windsor Park, Belfast
Attendance: 6,359
Referee: Alejandro Hernández Hernández (Spain)
19 July 2017
20:45 (19:45 UTC+1)

Celtic (Scotland)	4–0	(Northern Ireland) Linfield
Sinclair 4', 54'; Rogic 47'; Armstrong 90+2'	Report

Celtic Park, Glasgow
Attendance: 58,075
Referee: Stephan Klossner (Switzerland)

Celtic won 6–0 on aggregate.

12 July 2017
20:00 (21:00 UTC+3)

Mariehamn (Finland)	0–3	(Poland) Legia Warsaw
	Report	Guilherme 8' (pen.); Nagy 40'; Hämäläinen 44'

Wiklöf Holding Arena, Mariehamn
Attendance: 1,637
Referee: Andrew Dallas (Scotland)
19 July 2017
20:45

Legia Warsaw (Poland)	6–0	(Finland) Mariehamn
Guilherme 6'; Kojola 37' (o.g.); Kucharczyk 40', 54' (pen.); Szymański 80'; Michalak 81'	Report

Polish Army Stadium, Warsaw
Attendance: 15,843
Referee: Tiago Martins (Portugal)

Legia Warsaw won 9–0 on aggregate.

== Third qualifying round ==
The draw for the third qualifying round was held on 14 July 2017, 12:00 CEST. Times are CEST, as listed by UEFA (local times, if different, are in parentheses).

=== Seeding ===
The third qualifying round was split into two separate sections: Champions Route (for league champions) and League Route (for league non-champions). The losing teams in both sections entered the 2017–18 UEFA Europa League play-off round. A total of 30 teams played in the third qualifying round:

- Champions Route: three teams which entered in this round, and the 17 winners of the second qualifying round.
- League Route: ten teams which entered in this round.

Since the draw for the third qualifying round took place before the results of the previous round were known, the seeding was carried out under the assumption that the team with the higher coefficient of an undecided tie would advance to this round, which meant if the team with the lower coefficient was to advance, it simply took the seeding of its defeated opponent.

Champions Route				League Route	
Group 1		Group 2		League Route	
Seeded	Unseeded	Seeded	Unseeded	Seeded	Unseeded
(Scotland) Celtic (Denmark) Copenhagen (Belarus) BATE Borisov (Poland) Legia Warsaw (Slovenia) Maribor	(North Macedonia) Vardar (Kazakhstan) Astana (Norway) Rosenborg (Czech Republic) Slavia Prague (Iceland) FH	(Greece) Olympiacos (Austria) Red Bull Salzburg (Bulgaria) Ludogorets Razgrad (Cyprus) APOEL (Azerbaijan) Qarabağ	(Serbia) Partizan (Croatia) Rijeka (Moldova) Sheriff Tiraspol (Israel) Hapoel Be'er Sheva (Romania) Viitorul Constanța	(Ukraine) Dynamo Kyiv (Netherlands) Ajax (Czech Republic) Viktoria Plzeň (Russia) CSKA Moscow (Belgium) Club Brugge	(Romania) FCSB (Switzerland) Young Boys (France) Nice (Turkey) İstanbul Başakşehir (Greece) AEK Athens

Notes

1. ^{†} Winners of the second qualifying round, whose identity was not known at the time of the draw. Teams in italics defeated a team with a higher coefficient in the second qualifying round, thus effectively taking the coefficient of their defeated opponent in the draw for the third qualifying round.

=== Summary ===
The first legs were played on 25 and 26 July, and the second legs were played on 1 and 2 August 2017.

Team 1	Agg.	Team 2	1st leg	2nd leg
Champions Route
Slavia Prague (Czech Republic)	2–2 (a)	(Belarus) BATE Borisov	1–0	1–2
Astana (Kazakhstan)	3–2	(Poland) Legia Warsaw	3–1	0–1
Maribor (Slovenia)	2–0	(Iceland) FH	1–0	1–0
Vardar (North Macedonia)	2–4 (Note: Order of legs reversed after original draw.)	(Denmark) Copenhagen	1–0	1–4
Celtic (Scotland)	1–0	(Norway) Rosenborg	0–0	1–0
Hapoel Be'er Sheva (Israel)	3–3 (a)	(Bulgaria) Ludogorets Razgrad	2–0	1–3
Viitorul Constanța (Romania)	1–4	(Cyprus) APOEL	1–0	0–4 (a.e.t.)
Red Bull Salzburg (Austria)	1–1 (a)	(Croatia) Rijeka	1–1	0–0
Qarabağ (Azerbaijan)	2–1	(Moldova) Sheriff Tiraspol	0–0	2–1
Partizan (Serbia)	3–5	(Greece) Olympiacos	1–3	2–2
League Route
FCSB (Romania)	6–3	(Czech Republic) Viktoria Plzeň	2–2	4–1
Nice (France)	3–3 (a)	(Netherlands) Ajax	1–1	2–2
Dynamo Kyiv (Ukraine)	3–3 (a)	(Switzerland) Young Boys	3–1	0–2
AEK Athens (Greece)	0–3	(Russia) CSKA Moscow	0–2	0–1
Club Brugge (Belgium)	3–5	(Turkey) İstanbul Başakşehir	3–3	0–2

=== Champions Route matches ===
25 July 2017
19:00

Slavia Prague (Czech Republic)	1–0	(Belarus) BATE Borisov
Škoda 20' (pen.)	Report

Eden Arena, Prague
Attendance: 18,147
Referee: Bastian Dankert (Germany)
2 August 2017
19:00 (20:00 UTC+3)

BATE Borisov (Belarus)	2–1	(Czech Republic) Slavia Prague
Signevich 5'; Stasevich 46'	Report	Škoda 44'

Borisov Arena, Barysaw
Attendance: 12,436
Referee: Pol van Boekel (Netherlands)

2–2 on aggregate; Slavia Prague won on away goals.

26 July 2017
16:00 (20:00 UTC+6)

Astana (Kazakhstan)	3–1	(Poland) Legia Warsaw
Kabananga 36'; Mayewski 45'; Twumasi 90+4'	Report	Sadiku 79'

Astana Arena, Astana
Attendance: 26,100
Referee: Tamás Bognár (Hungary)
2 August 2017
20:45

Legia Warsaw (Poland)	1–0	(Kazakhstan) Astana
Czerwiński 76'	Report

Polish Army Stadium, Warsaw
Attendance: 24,937
Referee: Jakob Kehlet (Denmark)

Astana won 3–2 on aggregate.

26 July 2017
20:20

Maribor (Slovenia)	1–0	(Iceland) FH
Tavares 54'	Report

Ljudski vrt, Maribor
Attendance: 8,166
Referee: Andris Treimanis (Latvia)
2 August 2017
20:30 (18:30 UTC+0)

FH (Iceland)	0–1	(Slovenia) Maribor
	Report	Tavares 90+2'

Kaplakriki, Hafnarfjörður
Attendance: 2,563
Referee: Peter Kralović (Slovakia)

Maribor won 2–0 on aggregate.

25 July 2017
20:00

Vardar (North Macedonia)	1–0	(Denmark) Copenhagen
Jonathan 65'	Report

Philip II Arena, Skopje
Attendance: 12,000
Referee: Daniel Siebert (Germany)
2 August 2017
20:00

Copenhagen (Denmark)	4–1	(North Macedonia) Vardar
Greguš 2'; Barseghyan 26' (o.g.); Santander 75'; Sotiriou 88' (pen.)	Report	Nikolov 19'

Parken Stadium, Copenhagen
Attendance: 15,224
Referee: John Beaton (Scotland)

Copenhagen won 4–2 on aggregate.

26 July 2017
20:45 (19:45 UTC+2)

Celtic (Scotland)	0–0	(Norway) Rosenborg
	Report

Celtic Park, Glasgow
Attendance: 49,172
Referee: Tiago Martins (Portugal)
2 August 2017
20:45

Rosenborg (Norway)	0–1	(Scotland) Celtic
	Report	Forrest 69'

Lerkendal Stadion, Trondheim
Attendance: 20,974
Referee: Jonathan Lardot (Belgium)

Celtic won 1–0 on aggregate.

26 July 2017
19:00 (20:00 UTC+3)

Hapoel Be'er Sheva (Israel)	2–0	(Bulgaria) Ludogorets Razgrad
Nwakaeme 19'; Ohana 79'	Report

Turner Stadium, Be'er Sheva
Attendance: 15,183
Referee: Charalambos Kalogeropoulos (Greece)
2 August 2017
20:30 (21:30 UTC+3)

Ludogorets Razgrad (Bulgaria)	3–1	(Israel) Hapoel Be'er Sheva
Wanderson 9', 33'; Marcelinho 56'	Report	Ghadir 61'

Ludogorets Arena, Razgrad
Attendance: 5,398
Referee: Serdar Gözübüyük (Netherlands)

3–3 on aggregate; Hapoel Be'er Sheva won on away goals.

26 July 2017
20:00 (21:00 UTC+3)

Viitorul Constanța (Romania)	1–0	(Cyprus) APOEL
Ganea 75'	Report

Stadionul Viitorul, Ovidiu
Attendance: 3,873
Referee: Paolo Valeri (Italy)
2 August 2017
19:00 (20:00 UTC+3)

APOEL (Cyprus)	4–0 (a.e.t.)	(Romania) Viitorul Constanța
Carlão 54'; Merkis 93'; De Camargo 94'; Efrem 105+1'	Report

GSP Stadium, Nicosia
Attendance: 13,647
Referee: Aleksei Eskov (Russia)

APOEL won 4–1 on aggregate.

26 July 2017
18:45

Red Bull Salzburg (Austria)	1–1	(Croatia) Rijeka
Hwang Hee-chan 49'	Report	Gavranović 30'

Red Bull Arena, Wals-Siezenheim
Attendance: 12,714
Referee: Daniel Stefański (Poland)
2 August 2017
20:45

Rijeka (Croatia)	0–0	(Austria) Red Bull Salzburg
	Report

Stadion Rujevica, Rijeka
Attendance: 8,118
Referee: Hüseyin Göçek (Turkey)

1–1 on aggregate; Rijeka won on away goals.

25 July 2017
19:00 (21:00 UTC+4)

Qarabağ (Azerbaijan)	0–0	(Moldova) Sheriff Tiraspol
	Report

Tofiq Bahramov Republican Stadium, Baku
Attendance: 26,000
Referee: Sergey Tsinkevich (Belarus)
1 August 2017
19:00 (20:00 UTC+3)

Sheriff Tiraspol (Moldova)	1–2	(Azerbaijan) Qarabağ
Badibanga 90+4' (pen.)	Report	Ndlovu 45+3'; Míchel 86'

Sheriff Stadium, Tiraspol
Attendance: 7,742
Referee: Roi Reinshreiber (Israel)

Qarabağ won 2–1 on aggregate.

25 July 2017
20:45

Partizan (Serbia)	1–3	(Greece) Olympiacos
Tawamba 10'	Report	Ben Nabouhane 6', 56'; Emenike 90+1'

Partizan Stadium, Belgrade
Attendance: 24,658
Referee: Davide Massa (Italy)
2 August 2017
20:45 (21:45 UTC+3)

Olympiacos (Greece)	2–2	(Serbia) Partizan
Carcela 22'; Fortounis 51'	Report	Soumah 33'; Đurđević 85'

Karaiskakis Stadium, Piraeus
Attendance: 23,854
Referee: Xavier Estrada Fernández (Spain)

Olympiacos won 5–3 on aggregate.

=== League Route matches ===
25 July 2017
19:30 (20:30 UTC+3)

FCSB (Romania)	2–2	(Czech Republic) Viktoria Plzeň
Budescu 37'; Teixeira 61'	Report	Krmenčík 23'; Kopic 53'

Arena Națională, Bucharest
Attendance: 33,795
Referee: Aliyar Aghayev (Azerbaijan)
2 August 2017
20:15

Viktoria Plzeň (Czech Republic)	1–4	(Romania) FCSB
Krmenčík 64'	Report	Bălașa 27'; Teixeira 71'; Tănase 76'; Alibec 79' (pen.)

Doosan Arena, Plzeň
Attendance: 10,802
Referee: Alejandro Hernández Hernández (Spain)

FCSB won 6–3 on aggregate.

26 July 2017
20:45

Nice (France)	1–1	(Netherlands) Ajax
Balotelli 32'	Report	Van de Beek 49'

Allianz Riviera, Nice
Attendance: 31,342
Referee: Carlos del Cerro Grande (Spain)
2 August 2017
20:45

Ajax (Netherlands)	2–2	(France) Nice
Van de Beek 26'; Sánchez 57'	Report	Souquet 3'; Marcel 79'

Amsterdam Arena, Amsterdam
Attendance: 51,845
Referee: Andre Marriner (England)

3–3 on aggregate; Nice won on away goals.

26 July 2017
18:30 (19:30 UTC+3)

Dynamo Kyiv (Ukraine)	3–1	(Switzerland) Young Boys
Yarmolenko 15'; Mbokani 34'; Harmash 90+3'	Report	Fassnacht 90+1'

NSC Olimpiyskiy Stadium, Kyiv
Attendance: 36,341
Referee: Andreas Ekberg (Sweden)
2 August 2017
20:15

Young Boys (Switzerland)	2–0	(Ukraine) Dynamo Kyiv
Hoarau 13' (pen.); Lotomba 90'	Report

Stade de Suisse, Bern
Attendance: 13,303
Referee: Paweł Gil (Poland)

3–3 on aggregate; Young Boys won on away goals.

25 July 2017
19:30 (20:30 UTC+3)

AEK Athens (Greece)	0–2	(Russia) CSKA Moscow
	Report	Dzagoev 45+1'; Wernbloom 56'

Olympic Stadium, Athens
Attendance: 25,083
Referee: Marco Fritz (Germany)
2 August 2017
19:00 (20:00 UTC+3)

CSKA Moscow (Russia)	1–0	(Greece) AEK Athens
Natkho 74'	Report

VEB Arena, Moscow
Attendance: 12,000
Referee: Benoît Millot (France)

CSKA Moscow won 3–0 on aggregate.

26 July 2017
21:00

Club Brugge (Belgium)	3–3	(Turkey) İstanbul Başakşehir
Dennis 6'; Denswil 16', 79'	Report	Mossoró 59', 74'; Elia 62'

Jan Breydel Stadium, Bruges
Attendance: 26,788
Referee: Paolo Mazzoleni (Italy)
2 August 2017
19:45 (20:45 UTC+3)

İstanbul Başakşehir (Turkey)	2–0	(Belgium) Club Brugge
Adebayor 7'; Višća 34'	Report

Başakşehir Fatih Terim Stadium, Istanbul
Attendance: 9,168
Referee: István Kovács (Romania)

İstanbul Başakşehir won 5–3 on aggregate.

== Play-off round ==
The draw for the play-off round was held on 4 August 2017, 12:00 CEST. Times are CEST, as listed by UEFA (local times, if different, are in parentheses).

=== Seeding ===
The play-off round was split into two separate sections: Champions Route (for league champions) and League Route (for league non-champions). The losing teams in both sections entered the 2017–18 UEFA Europa League group stage. A total of 20 teams played in the play-off round:

- Champions Route: the ten Champions Route winners of the third qualifying round.
- League Route: five teams which entered in this round, and the five League Route winners of the third qualifying round.

Champions Route		League Route	
Seeded	Unseeded	Seeded	Unseeded
(Greece) Olympiacos (Scotland) Celtic (Denmark) Copenhagen (Cyprus) APOEL (Slovenia) Maribor	(Azerbaijan) Qarabağ (Kazakhstan) Astana (Croatia) Rijeka (Israel) Hapoel Be'er Sheva (Czech Republic) Slavia Prague	(Spain) Sevilla (Italy) Napoli (England) Liverpool (Russia) CSKA Moscow (Portugal) Sporting CP	(Romania) FCSB (Switzerland) Young Boys (France) Nice (Germany) TSG Hoffenheim (Turkey) İstanbul Başakşehir

=== Summary ===
The first legs were played on 15 and 16 August, and the second legs were played on 22 and 23 August 2017.

Team 1	Agg.	Team 2	1st leg	2nd leg
Champions Route
Qarabağ (Azerbaijan)	2–2 (a)	(Denmark) Copenhagen	1–0	1–2
APOEL (Cyprus)	2–0	(Czech Republic) Slavia Prague	2–0	0–0
Olympiacos (Greece)	3–1	(Croatia) Rijeka	2–1	1–0
Celtic (Scotland)	8–4	(Kazakhstan) Astana	5–0	3–4
Hapoel Be'er Sheva (Israel)	2–2 (a)	(Slovenia) Maribor	2–1	0–1
League Route
İstanbul Başakşehir (Turkey)	3–4	(Spain) Sevilla	1–2	2–2
Young Boys (Switzerland)	0–3	(Russia) CSKA Moscow	0–1	0–2
Napoli (Italy)	4–0	(France) Nice	2–0	2–0
TSG Hoffenheim (Germany)	3–6	(England) Liverpool	1–2	2–4
Sporting CP (Portugal)	5–1	(Romania) FCSB	0–0	5–1

=== Champions Route matches ===
15 August 2017
18:00 (20:00 UTC+4)

Qarabağ (Azerbaijan)	1–0	(Denmark) Copenhagen
Madatov 25'	Report

Tofiq Bahramov Republican Stadium, Baku
Attendance: 31,250
Referee: Paolo Tagliavento (Italy)
23 August 2017
20:45

Copenhagen (Denmark)	2–1	(Azerbaijan) Qarabağ
Santander 45'; Pavlović 66'	Report	Ndlovu 63'

Parken Stadium, Copenhagen
Attendance: 21,222
Referee: Alberto Undiano Mallenco (Spain)

2–2 on aggregate; Qarabağ won on away goals.

15 August 2017
20:45 (21:45 UTC+3)

APOEL (Cyprus)	2–0	(Czech Republic) Slavia Prague
De Camargo 2'; Aloneftis 10'	Report

GSP Stadium, Nicosia
Attendance: 13,073
Referee: Antonio Mateu Lahoz (Spain)
23 August 2017
20:45

Slavia Prague (Czech Republic)	0–0	(Cyprus) APOEL
	Report

Eden Arena, Prague
Attendance: 18,844
Referee: Milorad Mažić (Serbia)

APOEL won 2–0 on aggregate.

16 August 2017
20:45 (21:45 UTC+3)

Olympiacos (Greece)	2–1	(Croatia) Rijeka
Odjidja-Ofoe 66'; Romao 90+3'	Report	Héber 42'

Karaiskakis Stadium, Piraeus
Attendance: 21,352
Referee: Felix Zwayer (Germany)
22 August 2017
20:45

Rijeka (Croatia)	0–1	(Greece) Olympiacos
	Report	Marin 25'

Stadion Rujevica, Rijeka
Attendance: 8,105
Referee: Danny Makkelie (Netherlands)

Olympiacos won 3–1 on aggregate.

16 August 2017
20:45 (19:45 UTC+1)

Celtic (Scotland)	5–0	(Kazakhstan) Astana
Postnikov 32' (o.g.); Sinclair 42', 60'; Forrest 79'; Shitov 88' (o.g.)	Report

Celtic Park, Glasgow
Attendance: 54,016
Referee: Ovidiu Hațegan (Romania)
22 August 2017
17:30 (21:30 UTC+6)

Astana (Kazakhstan)	4–3	(Scotland) Celtic
Ajer 26' (o.g.); Muzhikov 48'; Twumasi 49', 69'	Report	Sinclair 34'; Ntcham 80'; Griffiths 90'

Astana Arena, Astana
Attendance: 19,075
Referee: Pavel Královec (Czech Republic)

Celtic won 8–4 on aggregate.

16 August 2017
20:45 (21:45 UTC+3)

Hapoel Be'er Sheva (Israel)	2–1	(Slovenia) Maribor
Nwakaeme 12'; Tzedek 45+2' (pen.)	Report	Tavares 10'

Turner Stadium, Be'er Sheva
Attendance: 15,265
Referee: Jonas Eriksson (Sweden)
22 August 2017
20:45

Maribor (Slovenia)	1–0	(Israel) Hapoel Be'er Sheva
Viler 15'	Report

Ljudski vrt, Maribor
Attendance: 12,066
Referee: Gianluca Rocchi (Italy)

2–2 on aggregate; Maribor won on away goals.

=== League Route matches ===
16 August 2017
20:45 (21:45 UTC+3)

İstanbul Başakşehir (Turkey)	1–2	(Spain) Sevilla
Elia 64'	Report	Escudero 16'; Ben Yedder 84'

Başakşehir Fatih Terim Stadium, Istanbul
Attendance: 12,894
Referee: Clément Turpin (France)
22 August 2017
20:45

Sevilla (Spain)	2–2	(Turkey) İstanbul Başakşehir
Escudero 52'; Ben Yedder 75'	Report	Elia 17'; Višća 83'

Ramón Sánchez Pizjuán, Seville
Attendance: 34,278
Referee: Willie Collum (Scotland)

Sevilla won 4–3 on aggregate.

15 August 2017
20:45

Young Boys (Switzerland)	0–1	(Russia) CSKA Moscow
	Report	Nuhu 90+1' (o.g.)

Stade de Suisse, Bern
Attendance: 20,003
Referee: David Fernández Borbalán (Spain)
23 August 2017
20:45 (21:45 UTC+3)

CSKA Moscow (Russia)	2–0	(Switzerland) Young Boys
Shchennikov 45'; Dzagoev 64'	Report

VEB Arena, Moscow
Attendance: 15,560
Referee: Anastasios Sidiropoulos (Greece)

CSKA Moscow won 3–0 on aggregate.

16 August 2017
20:45

Napoli (Italy)	2–0	(France) Nice
Mertens 13'; Jorginho 70' (pen.)	Report

Stadio San Paolo, Naples
Attendance: 49,324
Referee: Szymon Marciniak (Poland)
22 August 2017
20:45

Nice (France)	0–2	(Italy) Napoli
	Report	Callejón 48'; Insigne 89'

Allianz Riviera, Nice
Attendance: 32,103
Referee: Damir Skomina (Slovenia)

Napoli won 4–0 on aggregate.

15 August 2017
20:45

TSG Hoffenheim (Germany)	1–2	(England) Liverpool
Uth 87'	Report	Alexander-Arnold 35'; Nordtveit 74' (o.g.)

Rhein-Neckar-Arena, Sinsheim
Attendance: 25,568
Referee: Björn Kuipers (Netherlands)
23 August 2017
20:45 (19:45 UTC+1)

Liverpool (England)	4–2	(Germany) TSG Hoffenheim
Can 10', 21'; Salah 18'; Firmino 63'	Report	Uth 28'; Wagner 79'

Anfield, Liverpool
Attendance: 51,808
Referee: Daniele Orsato (Italy)

Liverpool won 6–3 on aggregate.

15 August 2017
20:45 (19:45 UTC+1)

Sporting CP (Portugal)	0–0	(Romania) FCSB
	Report

Estádio José Alvalade, Lisbon
Attendance: 46,678
Referee: Felix Brych (Germany)
23 August 2017
20:45 (21:45 UTC+3)

FCSB (Romania)	1–5	(Portugal) Sporting CP
Júnior Morais 20'	Report	Doumbia 13'; Acuña 60'; Martins 64'; Dost 75'; Battaglia 88'

Arena Națională, Bucharest
Attendance: 49,220
Referee: Cüneyt Çakır (Turkey)

Sporting CP won 5–1 on aggregate.

== Top goalscorers ==
There were 246 goals scored in 94 matches in the qualifying phase and play-off round, for an average of 2.62 goals per match.

Rank	Player	Team	Goals	Minutes played
1	(England) Scott Sinclair	(Scotland) Celtic	5	515
1	(Ghana) Patrick Twumasi	(Kazakhstan) Astana	5	540
3	(Brazil) Marcos Tavares	(Slovenia) Maribor	4	388
3	(Serbia) Andrija Pavlović	(Denmark) Copenhagen	4	434
3	(South Africa) Dino Ndlovu	(Azerbaijan) Qarabağ	4	519
3	(Nigeria) Anthony Nwakaeme	(Israel) Hapoel Be'er Sheva	4	540
7	(Serbia) Uroš Nenadović	(Armenia) Alashkert	3	257
7	(Netherlands) Eljero Elia	(Turkey) İstanbul Başakşehir	3	339
7	(England) Scott Quigley	(Wales) The New Saints	3	345
7	(Brazil) Wanderson	(Bulgaria) Ludogorets Razgrad	3	350
7	(North Macedonia) Boban Nikolov	(North Macedonia) Vardar	3	358
7	(Switzerland) Mario Gavranović	(Croatia) Rijeka	3	448
7	(Belgium) Igor de Camargo	(Cyprus) APOEL	3	544
