= Mikkel Mena Qvist =

Danish-Colombian footballer (born 1993)

Personal information
- Date of birth: 22 April 1993 (age 33)
- Place of birth: Bogotá, Colombia
- Height: 2.03 m (6 ft 8 in)
- Position: Centre-back

Youth career
- Lyseng
- ASA
- 2002–2012: AGF

Senior career*
Years	Team	Apps	(Gls)
2012–2017	Lyseng		
2017–2022	Horsens	67	(3)
2020	→ KA (loan)	11	(0)
2021	→ HB Køge (loan)	10	(1)
2021	→ KA (loan)	11	(1)
2022	Breiðablik	9	(1)
- * Club domestic league appearances and goals as of 21:43, 27 December 2022 (UTC)

Mikkel Mena Qvist (born 22 April 1993) is a former professional footballer who played primarily as a centre-back. Standing at 2.03 m, he is known for his height, aerial ability and long throw-ins. Born in Colombia, he grew up in Denmark and spent the majority of his career with AC Horsens, later playing in Iceland.

== Early life and youth career ==
Qvist was born in Bogotá, Colombia, and adopted into a Danish family as an infant. He began playing football with Lyseng before joining ASA. As an under-10 player he moved to AGF, where he spent a decade in the club's youth system. Initially a left winger, he was converted to left-back at under-13 level due to team needs.

After leaving AGF at under-19 level, he returned to Lyseng, playing senior football in the Denmark Series (fourth tier).

== Club career ==
=== AC Horsens ===
On 6 December 2016, Qvist completed a move to AC Horsens following a successful trial. He was signed directly from fourth-tier Lyseng after impressing Horsens scouts in a Danish Cup match between the two clubs.

He made his Horsens debut on 15 March 2017, coming on as a substitute in a 3–1 defeat to AGF in the Danish Cup. Although a natural full-back, he was used mainly in midfield during his first months at the club. His Danish Superliga debut came on 7 April 2017 in a 2–0 loss to Randers FC, entering as an 81st-minute substitute.

Qvist extended his contract in May 2017 until 2019, and again in May 2018 until 2022.

==== Loan spells ====
On 4 February 2020, Qvist joined Icelandic club KA Akureyri on loan for the 2020 season, making 11 league appearances.

He returned to Denmark in January 2021, joining HB Køge on loan for the remainder of the 2020–21 season, where he played 10 league matches and scored once. In July 2021, he rejoined KA on a second loan for the rest of the Icelandic season.

=== Breiðablik ===
Horsens terminated Qvist's contract on 26 January 2022, and he signed for Icelandic champions Breiðablik the following day. He made nine league appearances during the 2022 season as Breiðablik won the Icelandic title.

== Style of play ==
Qvist was noted primarily for his physical presence, standing at 2.03 m, which made him one of the tallest outfield players in Danish football. He played across the left side of defence and midfield during his early professional years, having previously featured as both a winger and a full-back in youth football. At Horsens, Qvist came to be used as a versatile defensive option, featuring as a centre-back, left-back and occasionally as a wide midfielder. His former clubs highlighted his aerial strength and his ability to contribute to set-piece situations, both defensively and offensively.

Qvist earned particular recognition for his long throw-ins, which several clubs described as a tactical asset. When HB Køge signed him on loan in 2021, the club explicitly highlighted his "long throw-ins" alongside his physicality as key qualities he would bring to the squad. His ability to deliver powerful, accurate throws into the penalty area added an alternative attacking dimension, especially for sides favouring direct transitions or set-piece pressure.

== Honours ==
Breiðablik

- Besta deild karla: 2022
