= Michael Lüftner =

Czech footballer

Personal information
- Date of birth: 14 March 1994 (age 32)
- Place of birth: Chabařovice, Czech Republic
- Height: 1.90 m (6 ft 3 in)
- Position: Centre back

Youth career
- Teplice

Senior career*
Years	Team	Apps	(Gls)
2012–2016	Teplice	87	(5)
2017	Slavia Prague	16	(0)
2017–2021	FC Copenhagen	35	(1)
2019–2021	→ Omonia (loan)	51	(1)
2021–2022	Fehérvár	9	(0)

International career^{‡}
2009–2010	Czech Republic U16	6	(0)
2010–2011	Czech Republic U17	15	(1)
2011–2012	Czech Republic U18	10	(0)
2012	Czech Republic U19	4	(0)
2013	Czech Republic U20	1	(0)
2013–2017	Czech Republic U21	19	(1)
2017	Czech Republic	1	(0)
- * Club domestic league appearances and goals as of 15 May 2022 ‡ National team caps and goals as of 12 October 2017

Michael Lüftner (born 14 March 1994) is a Czech professional footballer who plays as a centre back.

== Club career ==
=== Teplice ===
He has spent his early career in the Czech First League club Teplice. He broke into the first team squad early in the 2012–13 season, making his league debut in an 0–2 loss against Hradec Králové in October 2012. He scored his first league goal in November 2012 against defending champions Slovan Liberec, helping his team to a 3–0 victory. He became an integral part of Teplice's first team in the 2013–14 season, playing 8 whole league matches in a row before being sent off after 28 minutes in the 9th round against Příbram.

=== Slavia Prague ===
In December 2016, he signed for Slavia Prague on a contract until 2020 for an undisclosed fee reported to be over €500,000. He made his debut for Slavia in their next competitive match - a 2–0 Czech First League home win against Jihlava on 19 February 2017.

=== Copenhagen ===
On 11 May 2017, Slavia Prague officials announced that Copenhagen triggered the release clause on Lüftner's contract by a bid of €1,5 million. The move was confirmed four days later.

=== Omonia Nicosia ===
On 20 June 2019, Cypriot First Division club Omonia Nicosia announced that Lüftner will join the club as a loan from FC Copenhagen. He made his debut on 24 August 2019 against Doxa Katokopias in the 2019-20 season premiere. He scored his first goal (6/2/20) in the 52nd minute in the Cyprus Cup against Doxa Katokopias. His first goal in the Cypriot First Division(7/12/20) was against APOEL in the 38th minute.

=== Fehérvár ===
On 3 June 2021 it was confirmed, that Lüftner had joined Nemzeti Bajnokság I club Fehérvár FC from Copenhagen with immediate effect. On 31 August 2022, his contract was terminated by mutual consent.

== International career ==
He represented his country on UEFA U17 Championship in 2011. He was first called up to the senior Czech national team in August 2017 to face Germany and Northern Ireland in the World Cup qualifiers, but failed to make an appearance. He was again called up in September to face Azerbaijan and San Marino in the same competition, making his debut against San Marino on 8 October.

== Career statistics ==
As of match played 15 May 2022

Appearances and goals by club, season and competition
Club	Season	League			Cup		Continental		Other		Total	
Club	Season	Division	Apps	Goals	Apps	Goals	Apps	Goals	Apps	Goals	Apps	Goals
Teplice	2012–13	Fortuna Liga	13	1	0	0	—		—		13	1
Teplice	2013–14	Fortuna Liga	9	0	0	0	—		—		9	0
Teplice	2014–15	Fortuna Liga	24	0	5	0	—		—		29	0
Teplice	2015–16	Fortuna Liga	27	3	1	0	—		—		28	3
Teplice	2016–17	Fortuna Liga	14	1	1	0	—		—		15	1
Teplice	Total		87	5	7	0	—		—		94	5
Slavia Prague	2016–17	Fortuna Liga	14	0	2	0	—		—		16	0
Copenhagen	2017–18	Superliga	34	1	2	0	14	2	—		50	3
Copenhagen	2018–19	Superliga	1	0	0	0	1	0	—		2	0
Copenhagen	Total		35	1	2	0	15	2	—		52	3
Omonia (loan)	2019–20	Cypriot First Division	22	0	4	1	—		—		26	1
Omonia (loan)	2020–21	Cypriot First Division	29	1	2	0	11	1	—		42	2
Omonia (loan)	Total		51	1	6	1	11	1	—		68	3
Fehérvár	2021–22	Nemzeti Bajnokság I	9	0	2	0	2	0	—		13	0
Career total			196	7	19	1	28	3	0	0	243	11

== Honours ==
Copenhagen

- Danish Superliga: 2018–19

Omonia

- Cypriot First Division: 2020–21
