= 2014–15 F.C. Copenhagen season =

F.C. Copenhagen
2014–15 season
- Chairman: John Dueholm
- Manager: Ståle Solbakken
- Danish Superliga: 2nd
- Danish Cup: Winners
- UEFA Champions League: Play-off round
- UEFA Europa League: Group stage
- Top goalscorer: League: Nicolai Jørgensen (10); All: Nicolai Jørgensen (12)
- Highest home attendance: 32,526 (vs Brøndby IF, 21 September 2014)
- Lowest home attendance: 6,307 (vs Randers FC, 5 March 2015)
- Average home league attendance: 14,523
Home colours	Away colours

This article shows statistics of individual players for the football club F.C. Copenhagen. It also lists all matches that F.C. Copenhagen played in the 2014–15 season.

== Players ==
=== Squad information ===
This section show the squad as currently, considering all players who are confirmedly moved in and out (see section Players in / out).

N	Pos.	Nat.	Name	Age	EU	Since	App	Goals	Ends	Transfer fee	Notes
1	GK	(Denmark)	Andersen	43	EU	2014	47	0	2017	Free	
2	RB	(Norway)	Høgli	41	EU	2014	44	1	2016	Free	
3	LB	(Sweden)	Bengtsson	37	EU	2011 (Winter)	155	4	2014	Undisclosed	
3	LB	(Sweden)	Augustinsson	31	EU	2015	19	2	2019	DKK 11 m	
4	CB	(Sweden)	Nilsson	43	EU	2014	28	2	2017	Free	
5	CB	(Sweden)	Mellberg	48	EU	2013	29	4	2015	Free	
6	CM	(Brazil)	Claudemir	37	Non-EU	2010	184	14	2015	DKK 7m	
7	CM	(Argentina)	Mussis	33	Non-EU	2014	1	0	2019	DKK 14m	
8	CM	(Denmark)	Delaney	34	EU	2009	178	10	2017	Youth system	
9	ST	(Denmark)	Kadrii	34	EU	2014	14	3	2018	Undisclosed	
10	LW	(Denmark)	Jørgensen	34	EU	2012	97	32	2017	Undisclosed	
11	ST	(Denmark)	Cornelius	32	EU	2014	95	34	2018	DKK 27m	
13	CB	(Denmark)	Stadsgaard	40	EU	2012 (Winter)	74	2	2016	Free	
14	CF	(Iceland)	Sigurðarson	34	EU	2015	17	2	2015	Loan	
15	CB	(Sweden)	Antonsson	44	EU	2014	161	3	2016	Free	
16	RB	(Republic of Ireland)	Foley	40	EU	2015	4	0	2015	Free	
17	LM	(Sweden)	Kačaniklić	34	EU	2014	13	2	2015	Loan	
18	DM	(Ghana)	Amartey	30	EU	2014	43	6	2019	DKK 14m	
19	RW	(Iceland)	Gíslason	37	EU	2012	95	7	2016	Undisclosed	
20	RB	(Denmark)	Remmer	32	EU	2012	43	0	2017	Youth system	
21	GK	(Sweden)	Wiland	44	EU	2009 (Winter)	192	0	2016	DKK 8m	
22	SS	(Belgium)	De Ridder	38	EU	2014	36	3	2018	DKK 15m	
23	CF	(Germany)	Pourié	34	EU	2013	19	3	2017	DKK 10m	
24	AM	(Denmark)	Toutouh	33	EU	2011	64	7	2017	Free	
25	CB	(Denmark)	Zanka	35	EU	2014	184	12	2017	DKK 4 m	
29	DM	(Denmark)	Poulsen	45	EU	2014	77	12	2015	Free	
31	GK	(Denmark)	Busk	32	EU	2012	7	0	2017	Youth system	
32	SS	(Denmark)	Amankwaa	31	EU	2013	67	3	2017	Youth system	
33	ST	(Denmark)	Felfel	29	EU	2014	10	1	2016	Youth system	
34	RB	(Denmark)	Aaquist	30	EU	2014	1	0	?	Youth system	
35	CM	(Denmark)	Wohlgemuth	30	EU	2014	3	0	2015	Youth system	
36	CM	(Faroe Islands)	Olsen	29	EU	2014	12	3	2017	Youth system	
37	CB	(Denmark)	Lindbjerg	33	EU	2014	4	0	2015	Free	
41	GK	(Denmark)	Christensen	46	EU	2010	30	0	2015	Undisclosed	

- Last updated: 7 June
- Source: F.C. Copenhagen, players' Wikipedia articles, fck_kontrakter (for contract endings)
- Ordered by squad number.

=== Squad stats ===
				Total			UEFA Champions League		Danish Superliga		Danish Cup		UEFA Europa League	
No.	Pos.	Nat.	Name	Sts	App	Gls	App	Gls	App	Gls	App	Gls	App	Gls
1	GK	(Denmark)	Andersen	47	47		4		33		3		7	
2	RB	(Norway)	Høgli	42	44	1	4		31	1	3		6	
25	CB	(Denmark)	Zanka	41	42	3	4	1	29	2	3		6	
15	CB	(Sweden)	Antonsson	33	35		2		23		4		6	
3	LB	(Sweden)	Bengtsson	26	26		4		16		1		5	
19	RW	(Iceland)	Gíslason	25	34	1	1		25	1	2		6	
18	DM	(Ghana)	Amartey	41	43	6	3	1	29	3	4		7	2
8	CM	(Denmark)	Delaney	37	42	2	4		27	2	5		6	
32	SS	(Denmark)	Amankwaa	25	34	2	4		23	1	2	1	5	
10	LW	(Denmark)	Jørgensen	31	36	13	2		24	11	3		7	2
11	ST	(Denmark)	Cornelius	33	33	8	4	1	22	6	3	1	4	
22	SS	(Belgium)	De Ridder	23	36	3	3		23	2	5	1	5	
24	AM	(Denmark)	Toutouh	18	33	4	3		21	2	4	2	5	
4	CB	(Sweden)	Nilsson	22	28	2	3		17		5		3	2
6	CM	(Brazil)	Claudemir	17	22	1	2		14	1	1		5	
29	DM	(Denmark)	Poulsen	12	21	1			16	1	4		1	
3	LB	(Sweden)	Augustinsson	19	19	2			15	1	3	1	1	
20	RB	(Denmark)	Remmer	9	18		1		14		2		1	
14	CF	(Iceland)	Sigurðarson	13	16	2			13	1	2		1	1
9	ST	(Denmark)	Kadrii	10	14	3	4	1	8	2			2	
17	LM	(Sweden)	Kačaniklić	12	13	2			7	2	1		5	
36	CM	(Faroe Islands)	Olsen	1	12	3			7	2	3		2	1
33	ST	(Denmark)	Felfel	1	8	1			6		1	1	1	
16	RB	(Republic of Ireland)	Foley		4				4					
23	CF	(Germany)	Pourié	2	4		1		3					
37	CB	(Denmark)	Lindbjerg		3						2		1	
7	CM	(Argentina)	Mussis		1				1					
21	GK	(Sweden)	Wiland	1	1						1			
35	CM	(Denmark)	Wohlgemuth		1				1					
40	DF	(Denmark)	Mathisen		1				1					
41	GK	(Denmark)	Christensen	1	1						1			
5	CB	(Sweden)	Mellberg											
13	CB	(Denmark)	Stadsgaard											
31	GK	(Denmark)	Busk											
34	RB	(Denmark)	Aaquist											

Last updated: 7 June
Source: FCK.dk
Ordered by Starting 11 then appearances
0 shown as blank

=== Players in / out ===
==== In ====
No.	Pos.	Nat.	Name	Age	EU	Moving from	Type	Transfer window	Ends	Transfer fee	Source
35	CM	(Denmark)	Wohlgemuth	19	EU	Youth system	Promoted	Summer	2015	Youth system	FCK.dk
7	CF	(Norway)	Abdellaoue	25	EU	Odense Boldklub	End of loan	Summer	2016	n/a	
23	CF	(Germany)	Pourié	23	EU	Zulte-Waregem (Belgium)	End of loan	Summer	2017	n/a	
1	GK	(Denmark)	Andersen	32	EU	Real Betis (Spain)	Transfer	Summer	2017	Free	FCK.dk
2	RB	(Norway)	Høgli	30	EU	Club Brugge (Belgium)	Transfer	Summer	2016	Free	FCK.dk
4	CB	(Sweden)	Nilsson	31	EU	1. FC Nürnberg (Germany)	Transfer	Summer	2017	Free	FCK.dk
7	CM	(Argentina)	Mussis	22	Non-EU	Gimnasia y Esgrima (LP) (Argentina)	Transfer	Summer	2019	DKK 14,000,000	FCK.dk
18	DM	(Ghana)	Amartey	19	EU	Djurgården	Transfer	Summer	2019	DKK 14,000,000	FCK.dk
22	SS	(Belgium)	De Ridder	27	EU	Utrecht (Netherlands)	Transfer	Summer	2018	DKK 15,000,000	FCK.dk
25	CB	(Denmark)	Zanka	24	EU	PSV (Netherlands)	Transfer	Summer	2017	DKK 4,000,000	FCK.dk
9	ST	(Denmark)	Kadrii	23	EU	Odense Boldklub	Transfer	Summer	2018	Undisclosed	FCK.dk
15	CB	(Sweden)	Antonsson	33	EU	Bologna (Italy)	Transfer	Summer	2016	Free	FCK.dk
17	LM	(Denmark)	Kačaniklić	23	EU	Fulham (England)	Loan	Summer	2015	n/a	FCK.dk
36	CM	(Faroe Islands)	Olsen	18	EU	Youth system	Promoted	Summer	2017	Youth system	FCK.dk
29	DM	(Denmark)	Poulsen	34	EU	Ajax (Netherlands)	Transfer	Summer	2015	Free	FCK.dk
37	CB	(Denmark)	Lindbjerg	22	EU	Reserves	Promoted	Winter	2015	n/a	FCK.dk
3	LB	(Sweden)	Augustinsson	20	EU	IFK Göteborg (Sweden)	Transfer	Summer	2019	DKK 11,000,000	FCK.dk
31	GK	(Denmark)	Busk	21	EU	AC Horsens	End of loan	Winter	2017	n/a	
7	CM	(Argentina)	Mussis	22	Non-EU	Genoa (Italy)	End of loan	Winter	2019	n/a	FCK.dk
16	RB	(Republic of Ireland)	Foley	30	EU	Wolverhampton Wanderers (England)	Transfer	Winter	2015	Free	FCK.dk
14	CF	(Iceland)	Sigurðarson	23	EU	Wolverhampton Wanderers (England)	Loan	Winter	2015	n/a	FCK.dk
34	RB	(Denmark)	Aaquist	20	EU	AC Horsens	End of loan	Winter	?	n/a	FCK.dk

==== Out ====
No.	Pos.	Nat.	Name	Age	EU	Moving to	Type	Transfer window	Transfer fee	Source
12	CF	(Nigeria)	Adi	23	Non-EU	Portland Timbers (United States)	Transfer	Summer	DKK 7,000,000	Timbers.com
15	CB	(Austria)	Margreitter	25	EU	Wolverhampton Wanderers (England)	End of loan	Summer	n/a	
2	RB	(Denmark)	Jacobsen	34	EU	Guingamp (France)	Contract ended	Summer	Free	EAGuingamp.com
7	CF	(Norway)	Abdellaoue	25	EU	Aalesund (Norway)	Transfer	Summer	Undisclosed	AaFK.no
9	CF	(Belgium)	Vetokele	22	EU	Charlton Athletic (England)	Transfer	Summer	DKK 22,000,000	CAFC.co.uk
16	CM	(Denmark)	Kristensen	31	EU	ADO Den Haag (Netherlands)	Contract ended	Summer	Free	ADODenHaag.nl
22	RM	(Norway)	Braaten	32	EU	Free agent	Contract ended	Summer	Free	
30	RM	(Costa Rica)	Bolaños	30	Non-EU	Cartaginés (Costa Rica)	Contract ended	Summer	Free	
31	GK	(Denmark)	Busk	20	EU	Horsens	Loan	Summer	n/a	ACHorsens.dk
34	RB	(Denmark)	Aaquist	19	EU	Horsens	Loan	Summer	n/a	ACHorsens.dk
5	CB	(Sweden)	Mellberg	36	EU		End of career	Summer	n/a	FCK.dk
7	CM	(Argentina)	Mussis	22	Non-EU	Genoa (Italy)	Loan	Summer	n/a	GenoaCFC.it
23	ST	(Germany)	Pourié	23	EU	SønderjyskE	Loan	Summer	n/a	SoenderjyskE.dk
3	LB	(Sweden)	Bengtsson	26	EU	Mainz 05 (Germany)	Contract ended	Winter	Free	Mainz05.de
17	LM	(Sweden)	Kačaniklić	23	EU	Fulham (England)	End of loan	Winter	n/a	
6	CM	(Brazil)	Claudemir	26	Non-EU	Club Brugge (Belgium)	Transfer	Winter	Undisclosed	ClubBrugge.be
7	CM	(Argentina)	Mussis	22	Non-EU	San Lorenzo (Argentina)	Transfer	Winter	Undisclosed	FCK.dk
31	GK	(Denmark)	Busk	21	EU	Sandefjord (Norway)	Loan	Winter	n/a	SandefjordFotball.no
34	RB	(Denmark)	Aaquist	20	EU	Helsingør	Transfer	Winter	Free	FCHNet.dk

Last updated: 21 January

== Club ==
=== Coaching staff ===
Position	Staff
Head coach	(Norway) Ståle Solbakken
Assistant coach	(Denmark) Brian Riemer
Goalkeeping coach	(Netherlands) Anton Scheutjens
Fitness coach	(Denmark) Anders Storskov

Last updated: 1 July
Source: F.C. Copenhagen

=== Kit ===
Supplier: adidas
Sponsor(s): Carlsberg

Home	Away	Third (2014)

Source: FCKMegastore.dk

=== Other information ===
Chairman	(Denmark) John Dueholm
Technical director	(Denmark) Johan Lange
Club secretary	(Denmark) Daniel Rommedahl
Ground (capacity and dimensions)	Telia Parken (38,065 / 105x68 m)

Updated to match played 30 June
Source: F.C. Copenhagen and Telia Parken

== Competitions ==
=== Overall ===
Competition	Started round	Current position / round	Final position / round	First match	Last match
Danish Superliga	—	—	2nd	20 July	7 June
UEFA Champions League	Third qualifying round	—	Play-off round	30 July	27 August
UEFA Europa League	Group stage	—	Group stage	18 September	11 December
Danish Cup	Third round	—	Final	30 October	14 May

Updated to match played 31 May
Source: Competitions

=== Danish Superliga ===
==== League table ====
Pos	Team	Pld	W	D	L	GF	GA	GD	Pts	Qualification or relegation
1	Midtjylland (C)	33	22	5	6	64	34	+30	71	Qualification for Champions League second qualifying round
2	Copenhagen	33	20	7	6	40	22	+18	67	Qualification for Europa League second qualifying round (Note: Copenhagen qualified for Europa League second qualifying round by winning the 2014–15 Danish Cup. Therefore the spots awarded to the runners-up and third-placed teams are passed down to the third-placed team and fourth-placed team respectively.)
3	Brøndby	33	16	7	10	43	29	+14	55	Qualification for Europa League first qualifying round
4	Randers	33	14	10	9	39	28	+11	52	Qualification for Europa League first qualifying round
5	AaB	33	13	9	11	39	31	+8	48	

Source: Danish Superliga
Rules for classification: 1) points; 2) goal difference; 3) number of goals scored
(C) Champions

==== Results summary ====
Overall								Home						Away					
Pld	W	D	L	GF	GA	GD	Pts	W	D	L	GF	GA	GD	W	D	L	GF	GA	GD
33	20	7	6	40	22	+18	67	13	2	2	25	11	+14	7	5	4	15	11	+4

Last updated: 7 June.

==== Results by round ====
Round	1	2	3	4	5	6	7	8	9	10	11	12	13	14	15	16	17	18	19	20	21	22	23	24	25	26	27	28	29	30	31	32	33
Ground	A	H	A	H	H	A	A	H	A	H	H	A	H	A	H	A	H	H	A	H	A	H	A	A	H	A	H	A	A	H	H	A	H
Result	D	W	D	L	L	W	L	W	D	W	W	W	D	D	W	W	W	W	L	W	W	D	D	W	W	L	W	W	L	W	W	W	W

Updated to match(es) played on 7 June. Source: Competitive Matches
A = Away; H = Home; W = Win; D = Draw; L = Loss

=== UEFA Champions League ===
==== Third qualifying round ====
Team 1	Agg.	Team 2	1st leg	2nd leg
Dnipro (Ukraine)	0-2	(Denmark) Copenhagen	0-0	0-2

Last updated: 6 August.
Source: UEFA Champions League

==== Play-off round ====
Team 1	Agg.	Team 2	1st leg	2nd leg
Copenhagen (Denmark)	2-7	(Germany) Leverkusen	2-3	0-4

Last updated: 28 August.
Source: UEFA Champions League

==== Results summary ====
Overall								Home						Away					
Pld	W	D	L	GF	GA	GD	Pts	W	D	L	GF	GA	GD	W	D	L	GF	GA	GD
4	1	1	2	4	7	−3	4	1	0	1	4	3	+1	0	1	1	0	4	−4

Last updated: 27 August.

=== UEFA Europa League ===
==== Group stage ====
Pos	Team	Pld	W	D	L	GF	GA	GD	Pts	Qualification	BRU	TOR	HJK	KOB
1	(Belgium) Club Brugge	6	3	3	0	10	2	+8	12	Advance to knockout phase	—	0–0	2–1	1–1
2	(Italy) Torino	6	3	2	1	9	3	+6	11	Advance to knockout phase	0–0	—	2–0	1–0
3	(Finland) HJK	6	2	0	4	5	11	−6	6		0–3	2–1	—	2–1
4	(Denmark) Copenhagen	6	1	1	4	5	13	−8	4		0–4	1–5	2–0	—

Source: Soccerway
Rules for classification: Group stage tiebreakers

==== Results summary ====
Overall								Home						Away					
Pld	W	D	L	GF	GA	GD	Pts	W	D	L	GF	GA	GD	W	D	L	GF	GA	GD
6	1	1	4	5	13	−8	4	1	0	2	3	9	−6	0	1	2	2	4	−2

Last updated: 11 December.

== Matches ==
=== Competitive ===
Game	Date	Tournament	Round	Ground	Opponent	Score^{1}	TV	Report
1	20 July	Danish Superliga	1	A	Silkeborg IF	0 – 0	Canal 9	Report / Report link; Kick off / 17:00 CEST; Attendance / 5,416; Referee / Lars Christoffersen; Copenhagen / Silkeborg IF; Nilsson (yellow card) 17'; Claudemir (yellow card) 43'; De Ridder (yellow card) 70'; Høgli (yellow card) 79'
2	26 July	Danish Superliga	2	H	Nordsjælland	2 – 1	TV3+	Report / Report link; Kick off / 19:30 CEST; Attendance / 12,496; Referee / Jakob Kehlet; Copenhagen / Nordsjælland; Zanka 44'; Jørgensen 60'; Amartey (yellow card) 85' / Christensen (yellow card) 27'; Nordstrand (yellow card) 73'; Aabech 90'
3	30 July	UEFA Champions League	Third qualifying round	AR (Ukraine)	Dnipro (Ukraine)	0 – 0	TV3+	Report / Report link; Kick off / 19:00 EEST; Attendance / 23,410; Referee / Andre Marriner; Copenhagen / Dnipro; Zanka (yellow card) 4'; Amartey (yellow card) 64' / Matheus (yellow card) 12'; Mazuch (yellow card) 22'
4	2 August	Danish Superliga	3	A	Vestsjælland (Denmark)	2 – 2	Canal 9	Report / Report link; Kick off / 15:00 CEST; Attendance / 5,127; Referee / Jens Maae; Copenhagen / Vestsjælland; Cornelius 55'; Cornelius 61' (pen.) / Sørensen 9'; Dal Hende 21'; Bozga (yellow card) 36'; Lund (yellow card) 60'; Festersen (yellow card) 71'
5	6 August	UEFA Champions League	Third qualifying round	H	Dnipro (Ukraine)	2 – 0	TV3+	Report / Report link; Kick off / 20:00 CEST; Attendance / 18,875; Referee / Duarte Gomes; Copenhagen / Dnipro; Nilsson (yellow card) 20'; Cornelius 36'; Kadrii 52'; Amartey (yellow card) 72'; Cornelius (yellow card) 86'; Zanka (yellow card) 87' / Konoplyanka (yellow card) 40'
6	10 August	Danish Superliga	4	H	Hobro (Denmark)	0 – 3	Canal 9	Report / Report link; Kick off / 17:00 CEST; Attendance / 14,664; Referee / Mads-Kristoffer Kristoffersen; Copenhagen / Hobro; Zanka (red card) 80' / Antipas 7'; Justesen 49'; Hvilsom 61'; Høegh (yellow card) 81'
7	15 August	Danish Superliga	5	H	Midtjylland	1 – 2	TV3+	Report / Report link; Kick off / 19:30 CEST; Attendance / 13,106; Referee / Michael Tykgaard; Copenhagen / Midtjylland; Antonsson (yellow card) 17'; Amartey (yellow card) 80'; Andersen (yellow card) 90'; Delaney (yellow card) 90'; Cornelius 90' (pen.) / Bach Bak 81'; Onuach (yellow card) 83'; Igboun 90' (pen.); Haugaard (yellow card) 90'
8	19 August	UEFA Champions League	Play-off round	H	Bayer Leverkusen (Germany)	2 – 3	TV3+	Report / Report link; Kick off / 20:45 CEST; Attendance / 18,221; Referee / Carlos Velasco Carballo; Copenhagen / Bayer Leverkusen; Zanka 9'; Amartey 13'; Cornelius (yellow card) 51'; Amartey (yellow card) 90' / Kießling 5'; Bellarabi (yellow card) 25'; Donati (yellow card) 29'; Bellarabi 31'; Son 42'; Jedvaj (yellow card) 51'; Toprak (yellow card) 64'
9	27 August	UEFA Champions League	Play-off round	A (Germany)	Bayer Leverkusen (Germany)	0 – 4	TV3+	Report / Report link; Kick off / 20:45 CEST; Attendance / 23,321; Referee / Mark Clattenburg; Copenhagen / Bayer Leverkusen; De Ridder (yellow card) 90' / Son 2'; Çalhanoğlu 7'; Kießling 31' (pen.); Kießling 65'
10	31 August	Danish Superliga	6	A	OB	1 – 0	TV3+	Report / Report link; Kick off / 19:00 CEST; Attendance / 9,925; Referee / Jens Maae; Copenhagen / OB; Kadrii 45'; Cornelius (yellow card) 90' / Høegh (yellow card) 70'
11	13 September	Danish Superliga	7	A	AaB	0 – 1	TV3+	Report / Report link; Kick off / 20:35 CEST; Attendance / 8,546; Referee / Mads-Kristoffer Kristoffersen; Copenhagen / AaB; Amartey (yellow card) 29'; Nilsson (yellow card) 35'; Bengtsson (yellow card) 84'; Zanka (yellow card) 90' / Helenius 30' (pen.); Würtz (yellow card) 80'; Gorter (yellow card) 84'
12	18 September	UEFA Europa League	group stage	H	HJK (Finland)	2 – 0	Canal 9	Report / Report link; Kick off / 19:00 CEST; Attendance / 12,191; Referee / Jevgenij Aranovskyi; Copenhagen / HJK; Jørgensen 68'; Jørgensen 81' / Annan (yellow card) 33'; Heikkinen (yellow card) 62'
13	21 September	Danish Superliga	8	H	Brøndby	1 – 0	TV3+	Report / Report link; Kick off / 16:30 CEST; Attendance / 32,526; Referee / Kenn Hansen; Copenhagen / Brøndby; Kadrii 50'; Kadrii (yellow card) 51'; Delaney (yellow card) 71' / Thygesen (yellow card) 17'; Kahlenberg (yellow card) 90'
14	27 September	Danish Superliga	9	A	SønderjyskE	1 – 1	Canal 9	Report / Report link; Kick off / 15:00 CEST; Attendance / 5,535; Referee / Jakob Kehlet; Copenhagen / SønderjyskE; Cornelius (yellow card) 56'; Kačaniklić 57' / Jensen (yellow card) 25'; Guira 50'; Oggesen (yellow card) 90'
15	2 October	UEFA Europa League	group stage	A (Italy)	Torino (Italy)	0 – 1	6'eren	Report / Report link; Kick off / 21:05 CEST; Referee / Carlos Clos Gómez; Copenhagen / Torino; Gíslason (yellow card) 60'; Antonsson (yellow card) 90' / Benassi (yellow card) 54'; Molinaro (yellow card) 77'; Quagliarella 90' (pen.)
16	5 October	Danish Superliga	10	H	Esbjerg fB	2 – 1	Canal 9	Report / Report link; Kick off / 17:00 CEST; Attendance / 15,236; Referee / Michael Johansen; Copenhagen / Esbjerg fB; Claudemir 52'; Cornelius 57'; Jørgensen (yellow card) 64' / Pušić 22'; Knudsen (yellow card) 51' van Buren (yellow card) 79'; Andreasen (yellow card) 83'; Gomes (yellow card) 87'; Knudsen (yellow card) 89' (yellow-red card)
17	19 October	Danish Superliga	11	H	Randers FC	1 – 0	TV3+	Report / Report link; Kick off / 19:00 CEST; Attendance / 10,723; Referee / Anders Poulsen; Copenhagen / Randers FC; Kačaniklić 36' (pen.); Cornelius (yellow card) 44' / Keller (yellow card) 65'
18	23 October	UEFA Europa League	group stage	A (Belgium)	Club Brugge (Belgium)	1 – 1	Canal 9	Report / Report link; Kick off / 21:05 CEST; Referee / Michael Oliver; Copenhagen / Club Brugge; Amartey (yellow card) 49'; Delaney (yellow card) 66'; Amartey 89'; Zanka (yellow card) 90' / Silva (yellow card) 38'; Vázquez 90'
19	26 October	Danish Superliga	12	A	Hobro (Denmark)	2 – 0	Canal 9	Report / Report link; Kick off / 17:00 CET; Attendance / 4,738; Referee / Dennis Mogensen; Copenhagen / Hobro; Jørgensen 23'; Cornelius (yellow card) 79'; Toutouh 80' / Hansen (yellow card) 57'
20	30 October	Danish Cup	Third round	A	FC Roskilde	3 – 2	TV3+	Report / Report link; Kick off / 20:30 CET; Referee / Anders Poulsen; Copenhagen / FC Roskilde; De Ridder 8'; Cornelius 10'; Amankwaa 13'; Antonsson (yellow card) 70'; Olsen (yellow card) 72' / Fetai 71' (pen.); Fetai 82'
21	2 November	Danish Superliga	13	H	SønderjyskE	1 – 1	Canal 9	Report / Report link; Kick off / 17:00 CET; Attendance / 21,413; Referee / Peter Kjærsgaard-Andersen; Copenhagen / SønderjyskE; Jørgensen 40'; Zanka (yellow card) 56'; Jørgensen (yellow card) 83' / Jensen (yellow card) 42'; Absalonsen (yellow card) 52'; Lodberg 81'
22	6 November	UEFA Europa League	group stage	H	Club Brugge (Belgium)	0 – 4	6'eren	Report / Report link; Kick off / 19:00 CET; Attendance / 14,810; Referee / Manuel Gräfe; Copenhagen / Club Brugge; Amartey (yellow card) 32'; De Ridder (yellow card) 58'; Zanka (yellow card) 63'; Delaney (yellow card) 74' / Refaelov 7'; Refaelov 30'; Refaelov 36'; Meunier (yellow card) 45'; Vormer 60'
23	9 November	Danish Superliga	14	A	Nordsjælland	0 – 0	TV3+	Report / Report link; Kick off / 19:15 CET; Attendance / 4,567; Referee / Mads-Kristoffer Kristoffersen; Copenhagen / Nordsjælland; Poulsen (red card) 32'; Delaney (yellow card) 33'; Antonsson (yellow card) 37' / Vingaard (yellow card) 33'; Marcondes (yellow card) 37'; Maxsø (yellow card) 37'; Runje (yellow card) 54'; Mtiliga (yellow card) 60'; Nordstrand (yellow card) 66'
24	22 November	Danish Superliga	15	H	Silkeborg IF	1 – 0	TV3 Sport 1	Report / Report link; Kick off / 19:30 CET; Attendance / 8,456; Referee / Dennis Mogensen; Copenhagen / Silkeborg IF; Jørgensen 36'; Høgli (yellow card) 66'; Delaney (yellow card) 90' / Flinta (yellow card) 44'; Holst (yellow card) 83'
25	27 November	UEFA Europa League	group stage	A (Finland)	HJK (Finland)	1 – 2	Canal 9	Report / Report link; Kick off / 22:05 EET; Referee / Tony Chapron; Copenhagen / HJK; Høgli (yellow card) 41'; Gíslason (yellow card) 64'; Nilsson 89' / Baah 29'; Doblas (yellow card) 90'; Kandji 90'; Kandji (yellow card) 90'
26	30 November	Danish Superliga	16	A	AaB	1 – 0	TV3+	Report / Report link; Kick off / 19:00 CET; Attendance / 7,437; Referee / Jakob Kehlet; Copenhagen / AaB; Cornelius 15'; Amartey (yellow card) 63'; Amartey (yellow card) 85' (yellow-red card) / Risgård (yellow card) 42'; Gorter (yellow card) 65'; Petersen (yellow card) 83'
27	4 December	Danish Cup	Fourth round	A	Greve (Denmark)	3 – 0	TV3 Sport 1	Report / Report link; Kick off / 18:00 CET; Attendance / 3,633; Referee / Lars Christoffersen; Copenhagen / Greve; De Ridder (yellow card) 39'; Toutouh 45'; Delaney 67'; Felfel 90' / Frank (yellow card) 39'; Hunsballe (yellow card) 78'
28	7 December	Danish Superliga	17	H	Midtjylland	3 – 0	TV3+	Report / Report link; Kick off / 19:00 CET; Attendance / 17,499; Referee / Jens Maae; Copenhagen / Midtjylland; Larsen 41' (o.g.); Amankwaa 87'; Jørgensen 90' / Andersson (yellow card) 57'; Sisto (yellow card) 69'
29	11 December	UEFA Europa League	group stage	H	Torino (Italy)	1 – 5	Canal 9	Report / Report link; Kick off / 19:00 CET; Attendance / 9,202; Referee / Vladislav Bezborodov; Copenhagen / Torino; Amartey 6'; Antonsson (red card) 30'; Zanka (red card) 40' / Martínez 15'; Amauri 42' (pen.); Martínez 47'; Darmian 49'; Silva 53'
30	22 February	Danish Superliga	18	H	Vestsjælland (Denmark)	2 – 0	Canal 9	Report / Report link; Kick off / 17:00 CET; Attendance / 12,631; Referee / Kenn Hansen; Copenhagen / Vestsjælland; Augustinsson (yellow card) 20'; Høgli 45'; Augustinsson 54' / Østli (yellow card) 17'; Raitala (yellow card) 40'
31	1 March	Danish Superliga	19	A	OB	0 – 1	Canal 9	Report / Report link; Kick off / 17:00 CET; Attendance / 8,421; Referee / Mads-Kristoffer Kristoffersen; Copenhagen / OB; Amankwaa (yellow card) 75' / Zanka 84' (o.g.)
32	5 March	Danish Cup	Fifth round	H	Randers FC	0 – 0 (5-4 pen.)	TV3+	Report / Report link; Kick off / 18:00 CET; Attendance / 6,307; Referee / Anders Poulsen; Copenhagen / Randers FC; Toutouh (yellow card) 120' / Fisker (yellow card) 90'; Bjarnason (yellow card) 120'
33	8 March	Danish Superliga	20	H	Brøndby	3 – 1	TV3+	Report / Report link; Kick off / 15:00 CET; Attendance / 31,223; Referee / Jakob Kehlet; Copenhagen / Brøndby; Zanka (yellow card) 14'; Amartey 43'; Jørgensen 52'; Toutouh (yellow card) 78'; Delaney 90' / Ørnskov (yellow card) 14'; Núñez 47'; Holst (yellow card) 74'
34	15 March	Danish Superliga	21	A	Esbjerg fB	1 – 0	Canal 9	Report / Report link; Kick off / 17:00 CET; Attendance / 7,716; Referee / Lars Christoffersen; Copenhagen / Esbjerg fB; Cornelius 30'; Jørgensen (yellow card) 56'; Cornelius (yellow card) 89' / Andreasen (yellow card) 85'
35	22 March	Danish Superliga	22	H	Randers FC	1 – 1	TV3+	Report / Report link; Kick off / 19:00 CET; Attendance / 9,520; Referee / Jens Maae; Copenhagen / Randers FC; Jørgensen 49'; Zanka (yellow card) 74'; Jørgensen (yellow card) 84'; Cornelius (yellow card) 90' / Djiby Fall 77'; Poulsen (yellow card) 79'
36	6 April	Danish Superliga	23	A	Brøndby	0 – 0	TV3+	Report / Report link; Kick off / 16:00 CEST; Attendance / 22,020; Referee / Michael Tykgaard; Copenhagen / Brøndby; Delaney (yellow card) 20' / Elmander (yellow card) 73'; Pukki (yellow card) 79'
37	13 April	Danish Superliga	24	H	Silkeborg IF	4 – 0	TV3 Sport 1	Report / Report link; Kick off / 19:00 CEST; Attendance / 3,578; Referee / Mads-Kristoffer Kristoffersen; Copenhagen / Silkeborg IF; Poulsen 37'; Toutouh 42'; Amartey (yellow card) 45'; Sigurðarson 68'; De Ridder 73' / Flinta (yellow card) 31'; Pedersen (yellow card) 48'; Skov (yellow card) 83'; Gammelby (yellow card) 87'
38	16 April	Danish Cup	Semi-finals	H	Esbjerg fB	1 – 1	TV3+	Report / Report link; Kick off / 18:15 CEST; Attendance / 6,308; Referee / Jens Maae; Copenhagen / Esbjerg fB; Toutouh 11'; Augustinsson (yellow card) 44' / van Buren 68'
39	19 April	Danish Superliga	25	H	Nordsjælland	2 – 0	TV3+	Report / Report link; Kick off / 19:30 CEST; Attendance / 10,944; Referee / Kenn Hansen; Copenhagen / Nordsjælland; Jørgensen (yellow card) 31'; Jørgensen 40'; Jørgensen 45' (pen.); Amartey (yellow card) 74' / Petry (yellow card) 35'; Mulder (yellow card) 90'
40	26 April	Danish Superliga	26	A	Randers FC	0 – 3	TV3+	Report / Report link; Kick off / 19:00 CEST; Attendance / 5,777; Referee / Michael Johansen; Copenhagen / Randers FC; Høgli (yellow card) 55'; Andersen (yellow card) 89'; Olsen (red card) 90' / Ishak 44'; Ishak 76'; Keller (yellow card) 89'; Brock 90'
41	30 April	Danish Cup	Semi-finals	A	Esbjerg fB	1 – 0	TV3+	Report / Report link; Kick off / 19:30 CEST; Attendance / 9,011; Referee / Kenn Hansen; Copenhagen / Esbjerg fB; Augustinsson 79' / Knudsen (yellow card) 37'; Larsson (yellow card) 52'
42	3 May	Danish Superliga	27	H	Esbjerg fB	2 – 1	Canal 9	Report / Report link; Kick off / 17:00 CEST; Attendance / 12,892; Referee / Anders Poulsen; Copenhagen / Esbjerg fB; De Ridder (yellow card) 14'; Nilsson (yellow card) 22'; Amartey 73'; Jørgensen 88' / Nielsen (yellow card) 9'; Høgli 27' (o.g.); Söder (yellow card) 63'; Jakobsen (yellow card) 74'; Lekven (yellow card) 82'
43	11 May	Danish Superliga	28	A	Vestsjælland (Denmark)	1 – 0	TV3 Sport 1	Report / Report link; Kick off / 19:00 CEST; Attendance / 3,544; Referee / Dennis Mogensen; Copenhagen / Vestsjælland; Augustinsson (yellow card) 11'; Gíslason (yellow card) 35'; Delaney 58'; Delaney (yellow card) 67'; Felfel (yellow card) 90' / Østli (yellow card) 36'; Festersen (yellow card) 44'
44	14 May	Danish Cup	Final	N	Vestsjælland (Denmark)	3 – 2	TV3+	Report / Report link; Kick off / 16:00 CEST; Attendance / 24,095; Referee / Michael Tykgaard; Copenhagen / Vestsjælland; Delaney (yellow card) 36'; Nilsson 46'; Sigurðarson (yellow card) 50'; Sigurðarson 54'; Olsen 102'; Poulsen (yellow card) 117' / Vellios 31'; Kure (yellow card) 73'; Vellios (yellow card) 83'; Sørensen 88'; Dal Hende (yellow card) 90'; Sørensen (yellow card) 116'
45	17 May	Danish Superliga	29	A	Midtjylland	0 – 2	TV3+	Report / Report link; Kick off / 19:00 CEST; Attendance / 11,305; Referee / Kenn Hansen; Copenhagen / Midtjylland; Amartey (yellow card) 12'; Poulsen (yellow card) 40'; Nilsson (yellow card) 62' / Sparv (yellow card) 19'; Rømer 74'; Sisto 78'
46	20 May	Danish Superliga	30	H	AaB	1 – 0	TV3 Sport 1	Report / Report link; Kick off / 20:00 CEST; Attendance / 8,127; Referee / Jens Maae; Copenhagen / AaB; Amartey (yellow card) 16'; Gíslason 26'; Delaney (yellow card) 87' / Enevoldsen (yellow card) 53'; Petersen (yellow card) 64'
47	25 May	Danish Superliga	31	H	OB	1 – 0	Canal 9	Report / Report link; Kick off / 17:00 CEST; Attendance / 14,463; Referee / Mads-Kristoffer Kristoffersen; Copenhagen / OB; Poulsen (yellow card) 44'; Olsen 65' / Bušuladžić (yellow card) 72'; Nielsen (yellow card) 83'; Skogseid (yellow card) 86'
48	31 May	Danish Superliga	32	A	SønderjyskE	2 – 1	TV3 Sport 1	Report / Report link; Kick off / 16:00 CEST; Attendance / 5,643; Referee / Jørgen Daugbjerg Burchardt; Copenhagen / SønderjyskE; De Ridder 15'; Olsen 21'; Gíslason (yellow card) 90' / Sigurðsson (yellow card) 23'; Jensen (yellow card) 66'; Jensen (yellow card) 71' (yellow-red card); Lodberg (yellow card) 72'; Pourié 82'; Madsen (red card) 84'
49	7 June	Danish Superliga	33	H	Hobro (Denmark)	1 – 0	TV3 Sport 1	Kick off / 16:00 CEST; Attendance / 16,699; Referee / Peter Kjærsgaard-Andersen; Copenhagen / Hobro; Amartey 79' / Tjørnelund (yellow card) 84'

Last updated: 7 June
Source: FCK.dk
^{1}F.C. Copenhagen goals come first.
National flags for Ground and Opponent columns are only shown when different from that of F.C. Copenhagen.
M = Match; Ground: H = Home, A = Away, N = Neutral, HR = Home replacement, AR = Away replacement.
