= List of Danish football transfers summer 2015 =

This is a list of Danish football transfers for summer 2015, only the Danish Superliga is included

== Danish Superliga ==
=== AaB ===
In: Note: Flags indicate national team as defined under FIFA eligibility rules; some limited exceptions apply. Players may hold more than one non-FIFA nationality.

No.	Pos.	Nation	Player
6	DF	FIN	Jukka Raitala (from (Denmark) Vestsjælland)
7	FW	DEN	Thomas Enevoldsen (from (Belgium) Mechelen)
11	FW	DEN	Nicklas Helenius (from (England) Aston Villa)
17	MF	CMR	Christian Bassogog (from (United States) Wilmington Hammerheads)
24	MF	DEN	Asger Bust (Promoted)
27	MF	DEN	Oliver Abildgaard (Promoted)
79	FW	DEN	Jannik Pohl (Promoted)

Out: Note: Flags indicate national team as defined under FIFA eligibility rules; some limited exceptions apply. Players may hold more than one non-FIFA nationality.

No.	Pos.	Nation	Player
6	DF	NED	Donny Gorter (loan return to (Netherlands) AZ)
18	FW	DEN	Anders K. Jacobsen (to (Denmark) OB)
26	DF	DEN	Rasmus Thelander (to (Greece) Panathinaikos)
28	FW	DEN	Viktor Ahlmann (on loan to (Denmark) Vendsyssel)

=== AGF ===
In: Note: Flags indicate national team as defined under FIFA eligibility rules; some limited exceptions apply. Players may hold more than one non-FIFA nationality.

No.	Pos.	Nation	Player
2	DF	CRO	Dino Mikanović (from (Croatia) Hajduk Split)
4	MF	DEN	Daniel A. Pedersen (from (Denmark) Silkeborg)
8	MF	SRB	Aleksandar Čavrić (on loan from (Belgium) Genk)
14	FW	EGY	Ahmed Yasin (from (Sweden) Örebro)
15	FW	DEN	Emil Nielsen (on loan from (Norway) Rosenborg)
18	DF	CRO	Josip Elez (on loan from (Italy) Lazio)
20	MF	ISL	Theódór Elmar Bjarnason (from (Denmark) Randers)
25	DF	ESP	Adrián López Rodríguez (from (Canada) Montreal Impact)
26	FW	DEN	Morten Nordstrand (from (Denmark) Nordsjælland)
28	DF	RUS	Dzhamaldin Khodzhaniyazov (from (Russia) Zenit)

Out: Note: Flags indicate national team as defined under FIFA eligibility rules; some limited exceptions apply. Players may hold more than one non-FIFA nationality.

No.	Pos.	Nation	Player
3	DF	NOR	Johan Lædre Bjørdal (to (Norway) Rosenborg)
13	MF	ISL	Helgi Daníelsson (retired)
14	MF	DEN	Andreas Laudrup (retired)
15	DF	DEN	Nicolai Johannessen (released)
—	DF	ESP	David Cortés Caballero (released)
—	DF	FRA	Darnel Situ (to (Norway) Hødd)
—	DF	FRA	Arthur Sorin (released)
—	MF	GEO	Davit Devdariani (released)
—	MF	DEN	Kasper Povlsen (to (Denmark) Hobro)
—	FW	DEN	Jeppe Kjær (to (Denmark) Lyngby)
—	FW	DEN	Marcus Solberg (to (Denmark) Silkeborg)

=== Brøndby IF ===
In: Note: Flags indicate national team as defined under FIFA eligibility rules; some limited exceptions apply. Players may hold more than one non-FIFA nationality.

No.	Pos.	Nation	Player
2	DF	DEN	Jesper Juelsgård (from (France) Evian)
8	MF	JAM	Rodolph Austin (free agent)
9	FW	FIN	Teemu Pukki (from (Scotland) Celtic)
10	FW	SWE	Magnus Eriksson (from (China) Guizhou Renhe)
16	GK	DEN	Mads Toppel (from (Denmark) OB)
64	FW	DEN	Ronnie Schwartz (on loan from (France) Guingamp)
—	GK	DEN	Mads Hermansen (Promoted)

Out: Note: Flags indicate national team as defined under FIFA eligibility rules; some limited exceptions apply. Players may hold more than one non-FIFA nationality.

No.	Pos.	Nation	Player
1	GK	FIN	Lukáš Hrádecký (to (Germany) Eintracht Frankfurt)
8	MF	ARG	Alexander Szymanowski (to (Spain) Leganés)
16	GK	DEN	Michael Falkesgaard (to (Denmark) OB)
23	DF	DEN	Patrick da Silva (on loan to (Denmark) Randers)
24	MF	MKD	Ferhan Hasani (to (North Macedonia) Shkëndija)
26	DF	DEN	Mads Nielsen (to (Norway) Nest-Sotra)
29	FW	DEN	Nikolai Laursen (to (Netherlands) PSV)
-	DF	DEN	Kristian Larsen (released)

=== Esbjerg fB ===
In: Note: Flags indicate national team as defined under FIFA eligibility rules; some limited exceptions apply. Players may hold more than one non-FIFA nationality.

No.	Pos.	Nation	Player
4	MF	ISL	Victor Pálsson (from (Sweden) Helsingborg)
5	DF	DEN	Bjørn Paulsen (from (Denmark) SønderjyskE)
14	FW	DEN	Nicki Bille Nielsen (from (France) Evian)
18	DF	DEN	Leon Jessen (from (Germany) Kaiserslauten)
24	DF	DEN	Marco Lund (Promoted)

Out: Note: Flags indicate national team as defined under FIFA eligibility rules; some limited exceptions apply. Players may hold more than one non-FIFA nationality.

No.	Pos.	Nation	Player
16	GK	DEN	Jeppe Højbjerg (on loan to (Denmark) Fredericia)
18	MF	SWE	Erik Friberg (to (United States) Seattle Sounders FC)
23	DF	DEN	Jonas Knudsen (to (England) Ipswich Town)
29	MF	DEN	Jonas G. Hansen (released)

=== FC Copenhagen ===
In: Note: Flags indicate national team as defined under FIFA eligibility rules; some limited exceptions apply. Players may hold more than one non-FIFA nationality.

No.	Pos.	Nation	Player
6	MF	DEN	William Kvist (from (England) Wigan Athletic)
7	FW	SVN	Benjamin Verbič (from (Slovenia) Celje)
17	FW	DEN	Kasper Kusk (from (Netherlands) FC Twente)
19	FW	PAR	Federico Santander (from (Paraguay) Guaraní)
22	DF	DEN	Peter Ankersen (on loan from (Austria) Red Bull Salzburg)
28	GK	BEL	Thomas Kaminski (on loan from (Belgium) Anderlecht)
34	DF	DEN	Marcus Mathisen (Promoted)

Out: Note: Flags indicate national team as defined under FIFA eligibility rules; some limited exceptions apply. Players may hold more than one non-FIFA nationality.

No.	Pos.	Nation	Player
14	FW	ISL	Björn Bergmann Sigurðarson (loan return to (England) Wolverhampton Wanderers)
16	DF	IRL	Kevin Foley (released)
19	MF	ISL	Rúrik Gíslason (to (Germany) Nürnberg)
21	GK	SWE	Johan Wiland (to (Sweden) Malmö)
22	FW	BEL	Steve De Ridder (on loan to (Belgium) Zulte Waregem)
23	FW	GER	Marvin Pourié (on loan to (Russia) Ufa)
29	MF	DEN	Christian Poulsen (released)
33	FW	DEN	Yones Felfel (to (Denmark) Vestsjælland)
34	DF	DEN	Lasse Lindbjerg (to (Denmark) Tårnby)
34	MF	DEN	Mikkel Wohlgemuth (to (Denmark) Køge)

=== FC Midtjylland ===
In: Note: Flags indicate national team as defined under FIFA eligibility rules; some limited exceptions apply. Players may hold more than one non-FIFA nationality.

No.	Pos.	Nation	Player
2	DF	DEN	Kian Hansen (from (France) Nantes)
31	GK	DEN	Mikkel Andersen (from (England) Reading)
45	FW	AUS	Awer Mabil (from (Australia) Adelaide United)
70	DF	CZE	Filip Novák (from (Czech Republic) Baumit Jablonec)

Out: Note: Flags indicate national team as defined under FIFA eligibility rules; some limited exceptions apply. Players may hold more than one non-FIFA nationality.

No.	Pos.	Nation	Player
1	GK	DEN	Lasse Heinze (on loan to (Norway) Sarpsborg 08)
-	GK	DEN	Jakob Haugaard (to (England) Stoke City)
-	GK	DEN	Marco Priis Jørgensen (to (Norway) Mjøndalen)
-	DF	DEN	Frederik Møller (to (Denmark) Horsens)
-	MF	NGA	Sylvester Igboun (to (Russia) Ufa)
-	MF	NGA	Izunna Uzochukwu (to (Russia) Amkar Perm)

=== FC Nordsjælland ===
In: Note: Flags indicate national team as defined under FIFA eligibility rules; some limited exceptions apply. Players may hold more than one non-FIFA nationality.

No.	Pos.	Nation	Player
5	DF	BRA	Ramón (from (Slovakia) Trenčín)
7	MF	SVK	Stanislav Lobotka (from (Slovakia) Trenčín)
11	FW	BRA	Bruninho (from (Denmark) Køge)

Out: Note: Flags indicate national team as defined under FIFA eligibility rules; some limited exceptions apply. Players may hold more than one non-FIFA nationality.

No.	Pos.	Nation	Player
-	DF	CRO	Mario Tičinović (to (Belgium) Lokeren)
-	MF	DEN	Kristian Lindberg (to (Spain) Atlético Baleares)
-	FW	DEN	Uffe Bech (to (Germany) Hannover 96)
-	FW	DEN	Morten Nordstrand (to (Denmark) AGF)

=== Hobro IK ===
In: Note: Flags indicate national team as defined under FIFA eligibility rules; some limited exceptions apply. Players may hold more than one non-FIFA nationality.

No.	Pos.	Nation	Player
8	MF	SEN	Tidiane Sane (from (Turkey) Elazığspor)
15	MF	ZIM	Tanaka Chinyahara (from (South Africa) Bidvest Wits)
18	DF	ZIM	Ronald Pfumbidzai (from (Zimbabwe) CAPS United)
19	FW	NOR	Pål Alexander Kirkevold (from (Norway) Sandefjord)
21	FW	CRC	Mayron George (from (Greece) OFI)
22	MF	KOR	Park Jung-bin (from (Germany) Karlsruher SC)
25	MF	DEN	Kasper Povlsen (from (Denmark) AGF)
33	DF	MLI	Adama Tamboura (from (Denmark) Randers)
—	MF	ZAM	Aubrey Chirwa (from (Zimbabwe) Platinum)

Out: Note: Flags indicate national team as defined under FIFA eligibility rules; some limited exceptions apply. Players may hold more than one non-FIFA nationality.

No.	Pos.	Nation	Player
22	FW	DEN	Mads Hvilsom (to (Germany) Eintracht Braunschweig)
-	MF	DEN	Mathias Schlie (on loan to (Iceland) Valur)

=== OB ===
In: Note: Flags indicate national team as defined under FIFA eligibility rules; some limited exceptions apply. Players may hold more than one non-FIFA nationality.

No.	Pos.	Nation	Player
1	GK	DEN	Michael Tørnes (free agent)
8	MF	NED	Mohamed El Makrini (from (Netherlands) Cambuur)
10	FW	DEN	Rasmus Festersen (from (Denmark) Vestsjælland)
14	MF	DEN	Jens Jakob Thomasen (Promoted)
16	GK	DEN	Michael Falkesgaard (from (Denmark) Brøndby)
24	DF	DEN	Oliver Lund (from (Denmark) Vestsjælland)
25	GK	UKR	Maksym Koval (on loan from (Ukraine) Dynamo Kyiv)
26	MF	DEN	Matti Lund Nielsen (free agent)
28	FW	DEN	Anders K. Jacobsen (from (Denmark) AaB)

Out: Note: Flags indicate national team as defined under FIFA eligibility rules; some limited exceptions apply. Players may hold more than one non-FIFA nationality.

No.	Pos.	Nation	Player
2	DF	DEN	Kasper Larsen (loan return from (Kazakhstan) Astana, later to (Netherlands) Groningen)
8	MF	DEN	Martin Spelmann (to (Turkey) Gençlerbirliği)
13	FW	GEO	Vladimir Dvalishvili (released)
17	GK	DEN	Mads Toppel (to (Denmark) Brøndby)
23	FW	DEN	Thomas Mikkelsen (on loan to (Denmark) Vejle)
26	DF	DEN	Daniel Høegh (to (Switzerland) Basel)
39	DF	DEN	Emil Peter Jørgensen (to (Denmark) Fredericia)
—	DF	NOR	Håkon Skogseid (to (Norway) Lillestrøm)

=== Randers FC ===
In: Note: Flags indicate national team as defined under FIFA eligibility rules; some limited exceptions apply. Players may hold more than one non-FIFA nationality.

No.	Pos.	Nation	Player
8	MF	AUS	Mustafa Amini (from (Germany) Borussia Dortmund)
11	DF	DEN	Erik Marxen (from (Denmark) Horsens)
15	DF	DEN	Patrick da Silva (on loan from (Denmark) Brøndby)
17	MF	RSA	Mandla Masango (free agent)
22	GK	AUS	Jack Duncan (from (Australia) Perth Glory)
30	FW	POL	Piotr Parzyszek (on loan from (England) Charlton Athletic)

Out: Note: Flags indicate national team as defined under FIFA eligibility rules; some limited exceptions apply. Players may hold more than one non-FIFA nationality.

No.	Pos.	Nation	Player
57	FW	DEN	Emil Riis (to (England) Derby County)
-	GK	ISL	Ögmundur Kristinsson (to (Sweden) Hammarby)
-	DF	MLI	Adama Tamboura (to (Denmark) Hobro)
-	MF	ISL	Theódór Elmar Bjarnason (to (Denmark) AGF)
-	MF	DEN	Jonas Kamper (to (Denmark) Viborg)
-	FW	DEN	Nicolai Brock-Madsen (to (England) Birmingham City)

=== SønderjyskE ===
In: Note: Flags indicate national team as defined under FIFA eligibility rules; some limited exceptions apply. Players may hold more than one non-FIFA nationality.

No.	Pos.	Nation	Player
2	DF	POR	João Pereira (from (Denmark) Vejle)
5	DF	NED	Kees Luyckx (free agent)
7	FW	DEN	Marc Dal Hende (from (Denmark) Vestsjælland)
8	MF	DEN	Janus Drachmann (from (Denmark) Horsens)
15	MF	DEN	Troels Kløve (from (Denmark) Horsens)
25	FW	UGA	Emmanuel Okwi (from (Tanzania) Simba)
33	FW	DEN	Thomas Dalgaard (from (Netherlands) Heerenveen)

Out: Note: Flags indicate national team as defined under FIFA eligibility rules; some limited exceptions apply. Players may hold more than one non-FIFA nationality.

No.	Pos.	Nation	Player
29	DF	DEN	Morten Beck (on loan to (Denmark) Horsens)
—	DF	DEN	Bjørn Paulsen (to (Denmark) Esbjerg)
—	MF	DEN	Daniel Jensen (released)

=== Viborg FF ===
In: Note: Flags indicate national team as defined under FIFA eligibility rules; some limited exceptions apply. Players may hold more than one non-FIFA nationality.

No.	Pos.	Nation	Player
9	FW	CRO	Ante Rukavina (on loan from (Croatia) Dinamo Zagreb)
17	MF	DEN	Jonas Kamper (from (Denmark) Randers)
21	FW	DEN	Osama Akharraz (from (Denmark) Vestsjælland)
23	MF	DEN	Christian Sivebæk (from (Denmark) Vejle)
26	DF	NED	Jeroen Veldmate (from (Netherlands) Heracles Almelo)

Out: Note: Flags indicate national team as defined under FIFA eligibility rules; some limited exceptions apply. Players may hold more than one non-FIFA nationality.

No.	Pos.	Nation	Player
3	MF	MKD	Antonio Stankov (on loan to (Denmark) Vejle)
7	DF	DEN	Patrick Nielsen (on loan to (Denmark) Vendsyssel)
18	DF	DEN	Nicholas Gotfredsen (on loan to (Denmark) Fredericia)
—	MF	CUW	Elson Hooi (loan return to (Netherlands) NAC Breda)
—	MF	DEN	Martin Svensson (to (Denmark) Vejle)
