= Daniel Amartey =

Ghanaian association football player

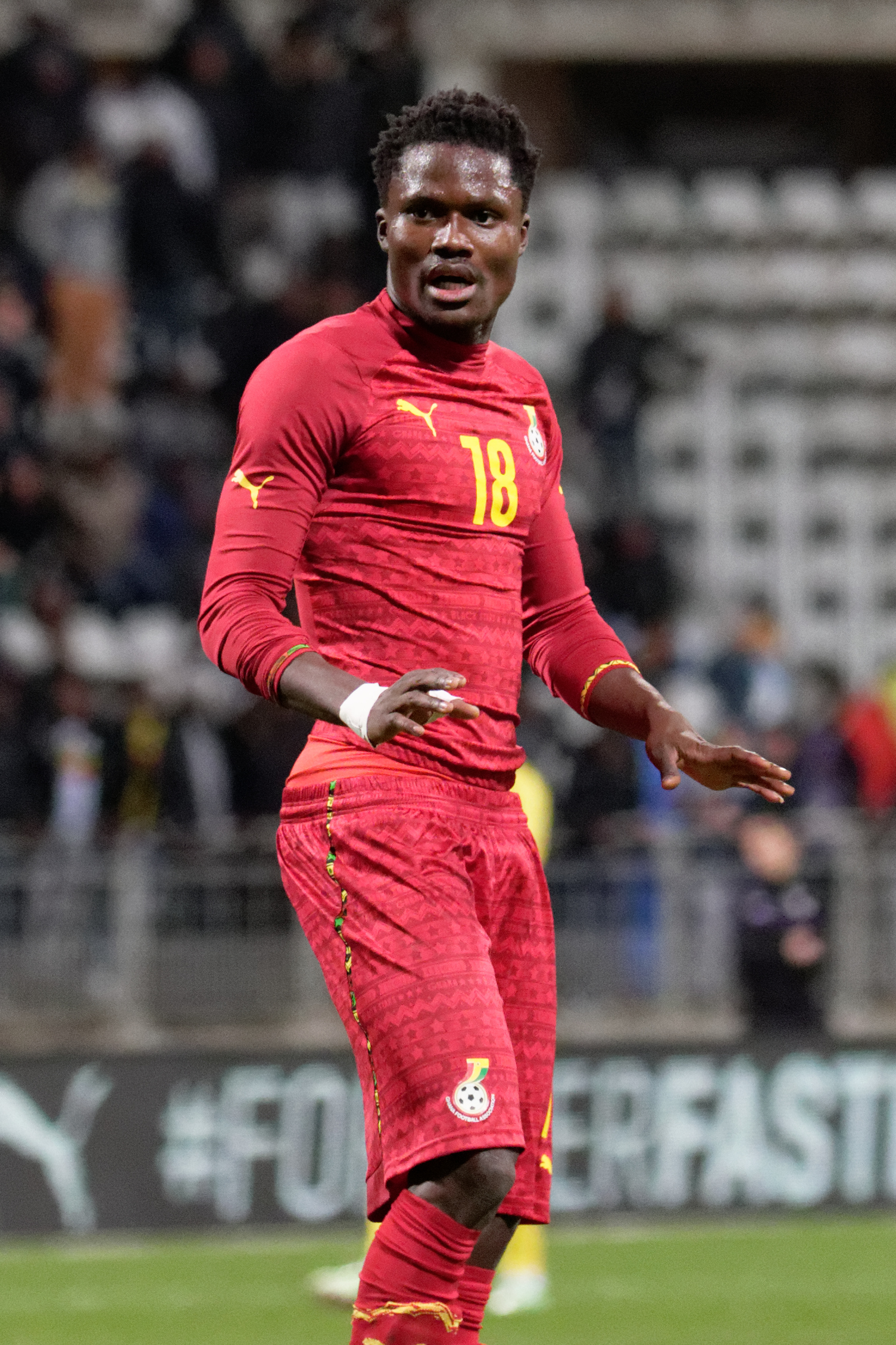
- Amartey playing for Ghana in 2015

Personal information
- Full name: Daniel Amartey
- Date of birth: 21 December 1994 (age 31)
- Place of birth: Accra, Ghana
- Height: 1.86 m (6 ft 1 in)
- Positions: Defender; midfielder

Youth career
- 2010–2012: International Allies

Senior career*
Years	Team	Apps	(Gls)
2013–2014	Djurgårdens IF	34	(0)
2014–2016	Copenhagen	44	(3)
2016–2023	Leicester City	106	(2)
2023–2024	Beşiktaş	18	(0)

International career
2012–2014	Ghana U20	2	(0)
2015–2024	Ghana	55	(0)
Medal record
Ghana
Runner-up	Africa Cup of Nations	2015
- * Club domestic league appearances and goals as of 4 April 2024

Daniel Amartey (born 21 December 1994) is a Ghanaian professional footballer who plays as a defender or midfielder. He is currently a free agent.

A graduate of International Allies' youth academy, Amartey played for Djurgården and Copenhagen, before joining Leicester City in January 2016, winning the 2015–16 Premier League with the side. After departing Leicester in 2023, he joined Turkish club Beşiktaş as a free agent.

== Club career ==
=== Djurgårdens IF ===
Amartey started out playing for second-tier club International Allies in Ghana where he was spotted as a sixteen-year-old by Magnus Pehrsson who was on a scouting trip in Africa during his preparation to take over as manager of Djurgårdens IF. When Pehrsson became manager he secured the transfer rights for Amartey from the day he turned 18. To help prepare Amartey for his future permanent move to Sweden in 2013, the club brought him over for shorter periods of time in both 2011 and 2012 where he got to play for the club's U21 team.

Amartey made his Svenska Cupen debut on 3 March 2013 against Umeå FC. He then made his league debut in the 2013 Allsvenskan opening game away against Helsingborgs IF on 31 March. Amartey was praised by the media for his strong start to the 2013 season, and foreign clubs like FC Schalke 04 and 1. FC Kaiserslautern started to scout him. On 26 May 2013, he scored his first ever goal for the club when he headed home the 1–1 equalizer in the 2013 Svenska Cupen Final which Djurgården eventually lost against IFK Göteborg on penalties. After his first season in the Swedish league as an eighteen-year-old Amartey was ranked as the 10th-best player in the league by newspaper Expressen and 18th best by Aftonbladet. In November 2013 Amartey confirmed that he was in talks with Liverpool over a possible move to the English club.

=== Copenhagen ===
In July 2014, Amartey moved to F.C. Copenhagen for a fee of €2.5 million plus add-ons, and made his Superliga-debut on 20 July 2014, in a match against Silkeborg IF.

=== Leicester City ===
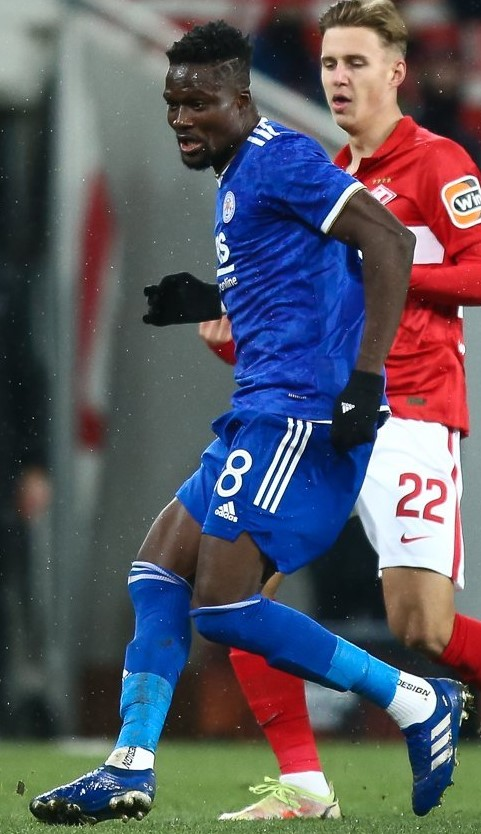
Amartey playing for Leicester City in 2021

On 22 January 2016, Amartey joined Premier League side Leicester City on a four-and-a-half-year contract for a fee around the region of up to £6 million. In his first season in his new country, Amartey featured five times as his team Leicester City won the Premier League title. He made his debut for the club on 27 February 2016, in 1–0 home league win over Norwich City.

In the 2016–17 season, Amartey became a first team regular following the departure of N'Golo Kanté. partnering teammate Danny Drinkwater in the central midfield role. While his workrate roughly equalled Kanté's, he was unable to match his tackles and interceptions. On 14 September 2016, Amartey started in his Champions League debut for Leicester in a 3–0 away win over Club Brugge in the group stage. Amartey scored his first goal for Leicester in an 88th-minute equaliser away at Stoke City on 17 December 2016, salvaging a 2–2 draw. On 8 February 2017, just over 12 hours after returning to Leicester from international duty, Amartey played the full 120 minutes (including AET) in a 3–1 FA Cup fourth-round replay win over Derby County.

In October 2018, Amartey broke his ankle in a game against West Ham United, ruling him out for the rest of the 2018–19 season.

Out of action for nearly a year, the closest Amartey came to a first team return was making the bench for an EFL Cup match against Luton Town in September 2019. He made his first team return almost two years after his injury in an EFL Cup match against Arsenal on 23 September 2020, which Leicester lost 2–0. Four days later he made his Premier League return when he started away at Manchester City in a 5–2 win. On 18 February 2021, Amartey started in his Europa League debut for Leicester in a 0–0 away draw against Slavia Prague in the first leg of the Europa League round of 32 tie. On 6 March 2021, Amartey scored his first goal for the Foxes in over four years, heading in a late winner to seal a 2–1 away league win over Brighton & Hove Albion.

On 15 May 2021, following Leicester City's FA Cup final victory over Chelsea, Amartey was filmed picking up a Chelsea pennant in the Leicester dressing room and throwing it over his shoulder to the floor in a video that went viral. He received criticism and backlash from many social media users, who deemed the gesture disrespectful. Leicester City later issued an apology to Chelsea, whom they accepted.

Amartey and Leicester started the 2021–22 season with the 2021 FA Community Shield in a 1–0 win over Manchester City. Amartey played the full match as Kelechi Iheanacho scored the winning goal, an 89th-minute penalty against his former club.

On 5 June 2023, following Leicester's relegation from the Premier League, it was announced that Amartey was one of the players who would leave the club upon the expiration of his contract on 30 June.

=== Beşiktaş ===
On 21 July 2023, Amartey signed a contract with Süper Lig club Beşiktaş.

On 13 September 2024, Amartey's contract was terminated with Beşiktaş for an undisclosed reason.

== International career ==
In May 2012 Amartey made his debut for the Ghana national under-20 football team in a game against Nigeria. He was also selected to play in the 2013 FIFA U-20 World Cup but Djurgården wanted to keep him in Sweden since the tournament clashed with the 2013 Allsvenskan season. In January 2015, Amartey played in all the group matches for Ghana at the 2015 Africa Cup of Nations, where the Black Stars finished as runners-up.

He played six times at the 2017 Africa Cup of Nations, lasting 90 minutes in every match to help Ghana finish fourth in the tournament. His performances saw him named in the CAF Team of the tournament. Amartey featured in the 2021 Africa Cup of Nations in Cameroon whom the Ghana national team was eliminated in the early stage of the competition.

== Career statistics ==
=== Club ===
As of match played 4 April 2024

Appearances and goals by club, season and competition
Club	Season	League			National Cup (Note: Includes Svenska Cupen, Danish Cup, FA Cup, Turkish Cup)		League Cup (Note: Includes EFL Cup)		Europe		Other		Total	
Club	Season	Division	Apps	Goals	Apps	Goals	Apps	Goals	Apps	Goals	Apps	Goals	Apps	Goals
Djurgårdens IF	2013	Allsvenskan	23	0	6	1	—		—		—		29	1
Djurgårdens IF	2014	Allsvenskan	11	0	1	0	—		—		—		12	0
Djurgårdens IF	Total		34	0	7	1	—		—		—		41	1
Copenhagen	2014–15	Danish Superliga	29	3	5	0	—		9 (Note: Three appearances and one goal in UEFA Champions League, six appearances and two goals in UEFA Europa League)	3	—		43	6
Copenhagen	2015–16	Danish Superliga	15	0	2	0	—		3 (Note: Appearances in UEFA Europa League)	0	—		20	0
Copenhagen	Total		44	3	7	0	—		12	3	—		63	6
Leicester City	2015–16	Premier League	5	0	—		—		—		—		5	0
Leicester City	2016–17	Premier League	24	1	2	0	1	0	8 (Note: Appearances in UEFA Champions League)	0	0	0	35	1
Leicester City	2017–18	Premier League	8	0	2	0	4	0	—		—		14	0
Leicester City	2018–19	Premier League	9	0	0	0	1	0	—		—		10	0
Leicester City	2019–20	Premier League	0	0	0	0	0	0	—		—		0	0
Leicester City	2020–21	Premier League	12	1	2	0	1	0	2	0	—		17	1
Leicester City	2021–22	Premier League	28	0	1	0	1	0	9 (Note: Four appearances and one goal in UEFA Europa League, five appearances in UEFA Europa Conference League)	1	1 (Note: Appearance in FA Community Shield)	0	40	1
Leicester City	2022–23	Premier League	20	0	2	0	2	0	—		—		24	0
Leicester City	Total		106	2	9	0	10	0	19	1	1	0	145	3
Leicester City U23	2017–18	—			—		—		—		1 (Note: Appearance in EFL Trophy)	0	1	0
Leicester City U23	2019–20	—			—		—		—		1	0	1	0
Leicester City U23	Total		—		—		—		—		2	0	2	0
Beşiktaş	2023–24	Süper Lig	18	0	2	0	—		7 (Note: Appearances in UEFA Europa Conference League)	1	—		27	1
Career total			201	4	25	1	10	0	38	5	3	0	278	10

=== International ===
Appearances and goals by national team and year
National team	Year	Apps	Goals
Ghana	2015	8	0
Ghana	2016	5	0
Ghana	2017	11	0
Ghana	2018	1	0
Ghana	2019	0	0
Ghana	2020	0	0
Ghana	2021	7	0
Ghana	2022	16	0
Ghana	2023	4	0
Ghana	2024	1	0
Total		53	0

== Honours ==
Copenhagen

- Danish Superliga: 2015–16
- Danish Cup: 2014–15, 2015–16

Leicester City

- Premier League: 2015–16
- FA Cup: 2020–21
- FA Community Shield: 2021

Beşiktaş

- Turkish Cup: 2023–24
