= Ludwig Augustinsson =

Swedish footballer (born 1994)

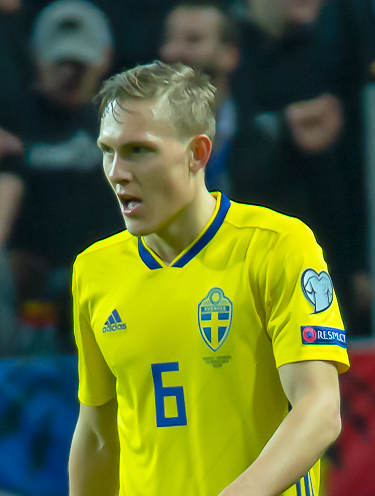
- Augustinsson with Sweden in 2019

Personal information
- Full name: Hans Carl Ludwig Augustinsson
- Date of birth: 21 April 1994 (age 32)
- Place of birth: Stockholm, Sweden
- Height: 1.81 m (5 ft 11 in)
- Position: Left-back

Team information
- Current team: Anderlecht
- Number: 6

Youth career
- 1999–2011: IF Brommapojkarna

Senior career*
Years	Team	Apps	(Gls)
2011–2012	IF Brommapojkarna	30	(2)
2013–2014	IFK Göteborg	29	(1)
2015–2017	Copenhagen	78	(3)
2017–2021	Werder Bremen	98	(2)
2021–2024	Sevilla	19	(0)
2022–2023	→ Aston Villa (loan)	3	(0)
2023	→ Mallorca (loan)	4	(0)
2023–2024	→ Anderlecht (loan)	31	(0)
2024–	Anderlecht	58	(1)

International career^{‡}
2009–2011	Sweden U17	12	(0)
2011–2013	Sweden U19	9	(0)
2012–2015	Sweden U21	19	(0)
2015–2024	Sweden	56	(2)
Medal record
Men's football
Representing Sweden
UEFA European Under-21 Championship
Winner	2015
- * Club domestic league appearances and goals as of 19:00, 10 October 2026 (UTC) ‡ National team caps and goals as of 20:23, 5 September 2024 (UTC)

Hans Carl Ludwig Augustinsson (Swedish pronunciation: [ˈlɵd.vɪɡ ˌɑw.ɡɵsˈtɪnˌsɔn]; born 21 April 1994) is a Swedish professional footballer who plays as a left-back for Pro League club Anderlecht.

A product of Brommapojkarna's academy, he played two senior seasons with the club before leaving for IFK Göteborg in 2013. With an injury-filled first year, his breakthrough had to wait until the 2014 season, in which he was named the best left back of the campaign. A move to Copenhagen followed in January 2015 for an estimated record fee of €1.4 million. He has ended up being club champion twice, with Copenhagen in the 2015–16 season and 2016–17 season, and runner-up three times with his teams; in Superettan 2012, Allsvenskan 2014 and in the 2014–15 Danish Superliga. He won one domestic cup title with IFK Göteborg 2012–13 and three consecutive domestic cup titles with Copenhagen in 2014–15, 2015–16 and 2016–17. He joined Bundesliga side Werder Bremen in summer 2017, spending four seasons with the German club before moving to La Liga club Sevilla.

Augustinsson was part of the Sweden under-21 squad that qualified and later won the European U21 Championship in 2015, playing all five games in the main tournament and scoring in the penalty shoot-out against Portugal in the final. He made his first appearance for the senior national team in January 2015, and was part of Sweden's Euro 2016, 2018 FIFA World Cup, and Euro 2020 squads.

== Club career ==
=== IF Brommapojkarna ===
Augustinsson started his football career at age six with Stockholm side IF Brommapojkarna. He was notable throughout his youth years, being the captain for the team's U17 squad and having trials with clubs such as Borussia Mönchengladbach and Sampdoria. After advancing through the youth ranks, he earned a spot in the first team as a 16-year-old in 2011 and made his debut in Superettan later that year. With four appearances in his debut season, including his senior debut in the domestic cup, he came to play almost every game the following year, ending up with two goals and four assists. With two senior seasons and 30 league games for Brommapojkarna, Augustinsson moved to IFK Göteborg in January 2013, turning down offers from several other professional clubs.

=== IFK Göteborg ===
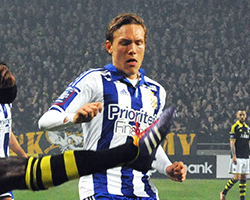
Ludwig Augustinsson playing for IFK Göteborg

The move to top team IFK Göteborg went well and Augustinsson played most of the games during the pre-season. When Svenska Cupen began in March, he was first-choice as left-back and played two games in the group stage. IFK Göteborg later won the cup against Djurgården in the final. Just a couple of weeks before the start of 2013 Allsvenskan, he picked up a knee injury while playing for Sweden under-21s, which kept him out of action for five months. On his Allsvenskan debut on 25 August 2013 in an away match against Malmö FF he suffered another injury, which meant that he would be out for the rest of the season.

Augustinsson came back from his second injury in time for the first competitive match in 2014, against Värnamo in Svenska Cupen in early March. He scored his first goal in Allsvenskan on 24 September in the 2014 season, when IFK Göteborg won away against Örebro SK by 4–3. He played 28 league games that season, without being substituted, and assisted for three goals. He later earned a spot in Allsvenskan's Team of the Year 2014 – voted by supporters of the SvenskaFans.com website.

=== Copenhagen ===
Augustinsson transferred to F.C. Copenhagen on 5 January 2015 after signing a 4.5-year contract on 6 June 2014. The deal was made so he could be the replacement for Pierre Bengtsson at the left-back position when Bengtsson's contract ended with Copenhagen on 31 December 2014. The transfer fee was estimated at 13 million SEK (approximately €1.4 million), which made him the most expensive wing-back ever bought from Sweden.

==== 2014–15 season ====
Having played every exhibition game during the winter break for Copenhagen, Augustinsson made his Superliga-debut against Vestsjælland when the season restarted in February. He assisted the first goal of the game and scored later himself, playing a key role in the team's 2–0 victory. Ekstra Bladet described it as "the dream debut" and manager Ståle Solbakken said it was the best debut since his own debut for Copenhagen against rivals Brøndby back in the year 2000.

He came to play 15 league games during the spring season, helping the team reach the second place in the league. He was noted for six assists, which placed him third in the assist-table and which made him the defender with the most assists of the 2014–15 season – despite playing less than half of the games. Defensively Copenhagen only conceded goals in six games, with many experts claiming that he was one of the best players of the spring season.

Augustinsson played regularly in the Danish Cup as well throughout the spring, and scored a match winning 1–0 goal from a free kick against Esbjerg in the second game of the semifinals. Copenhagen later won the final in May against Vestsjælland, with him providing an assist in the team's 3–2 win. The cup win was his second title of his career and his first for the club.

==== 2015–16 season ====
The 2015–16 season was Augustinsson's most successful season in his career, winning his first domestic league title and securing his third domestic cup victory. Being rumored with moves to top teams, such as Liverpool, after winning the 2015 UEFA European Under-21 Championship, Augustinsson stayed in Denmark and played his first complete season for Copenhagen.

In the league, Augustinsson played every minute of the first 30 games, until he was rested for the final two away games when the trophy was already secured in the middle of May. He assisted to nine goals throughout the campaign, placing him as tied leader with Nicolaj Thomsen and Rasmus Falk. Ekstra Bladet ranked him as one of the five best players for Copenhagen, awarding 5 of 6 stars for his performance, citing an improvement compared to the spring part of the season.

==== 2016–17 season ====
During the Copenhagen derby at Brøndby on 17 April 2017, Augustinsson had dead rats thrown at him by home supporters as he prepared to take a corner kick. Play was stopped and Copenhagen players attempted to kick the rats off the pitch before stewards arrived to pick up the rodents.

=== Werder Bremen ===
On 30 January 2017, Werder Bremen announced the signing of Augustinsson for the forthcoming 2017–18 Bundesliga season. In August 2018, upon his return from holidays after the 2018 FIFA World Cup, he agreed a contract extension with Werder Bremen.

On 6 July 2020, Werder Bremen played 1. FC Heidenheim in the second leg of the Bundesliga relegation playoff, having tied the first leg 0–0. In the 90+4th minute, Augustinsson scored to give Werder Bremen a 2–1 lead. They match ended 2–2, and Bremen stayed in the Bundesliga on away goals.

=== Sevilla ===
Augustinsson moved to La Liga club Sevilla in August 2021.

==== Loan to Aston Villa ====
On 11 July 2022, Augustinsson joined Premier League club Aston Villa on a season-long loan, with the English club having the option to make the transfer permanent at the end of the loan. Augustinsson made his debut for Aston Villa on 2 October 2022, an away Premier League draw against Leeds United, starting the match due to an injury to Lucas Digne. Augustinsson himself, however, would suffer a hamstring injury in the first half of the match and was substituted.

==== Loan to Anderlecht ====
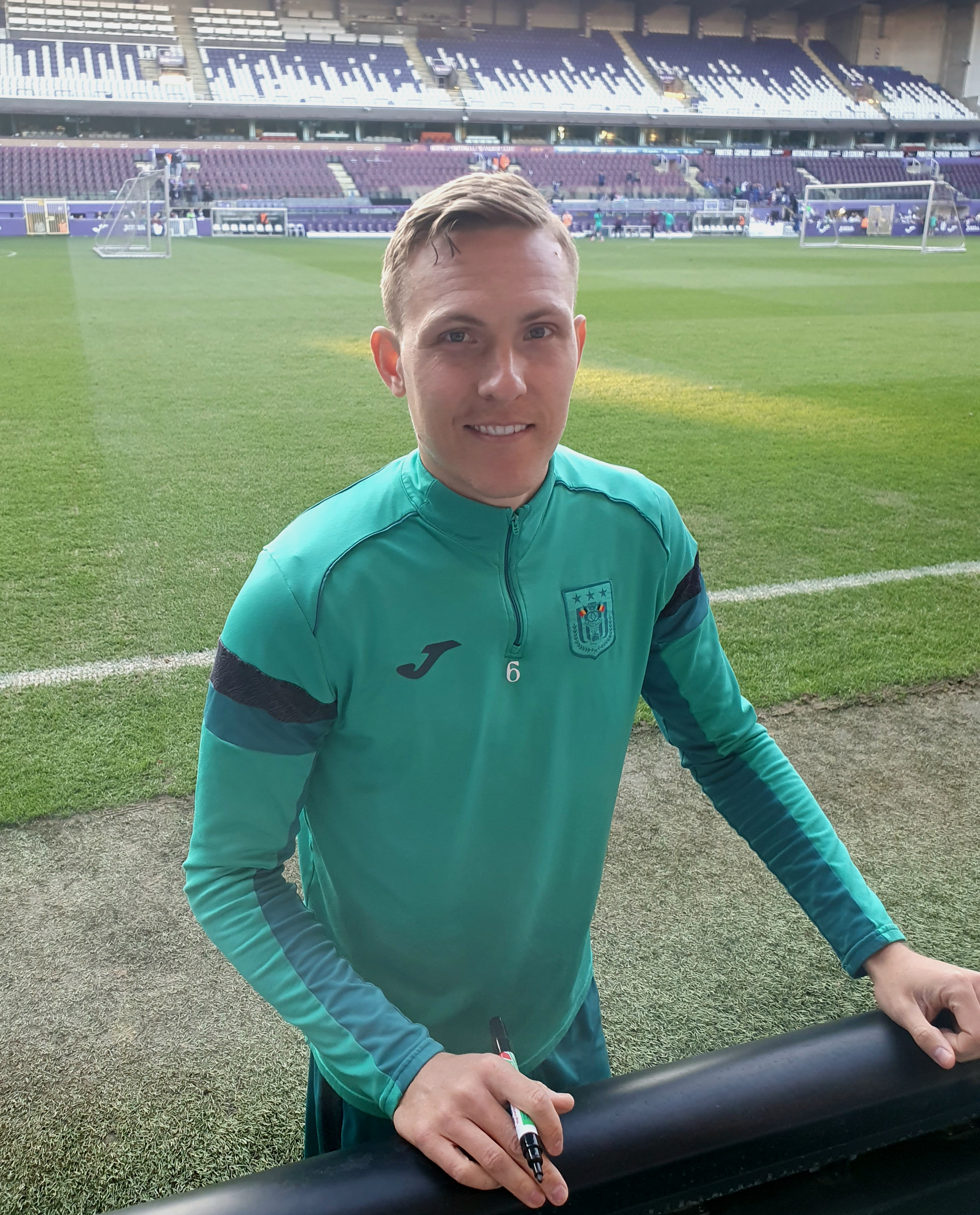
Augustinsson at a fan day of RSC Anderlecht in 2025

Augustinsson again departed Sevilla on loan in August 2023, joining Belgian Pro League club Anderlecht for the 2023–24 season.

=== Anderlecht ===
On 6 August 2024, Anderlecht announced they had permanently signed Augustinsson from Sevilla on a three-year deal.

On 17 August 2024, he scored his first goal for Anderlecht, in a 3–1 away win against KV Mechelen.

== International career ==
=== Youth national teams ===
Augustinsson represented Sweden under-17s and the under-19s 21 times between 2009 and 2013. He has made 19 caps for Sweden under-21s since 2012 and is still eligible to play for the team. His biggest success came for the under-21 team, when they manage to qualify to the 2015 UEFA European Under-21 Championship and later win the tournament, whilst being a key player in Håkan Ericson's squad.

In 2016, Augustinsson was denied joining Sweden under-23s squad for the 2016 Olympics in August by his club Copenhagen.

==== European U21 Championship ====
Outstanding throughout the tournament and exceptional in the final, where he forced the livewire João Mário into his most ineffective performance of the competition. Showed his commitment and drive (and not to mention fitness) with one final lung-bursting charge into the box in the 121st minute of the game and slammed home his penalty in the shootout.

— The Guardian about Ludwig Augustinsson's performance in the tournament.

Sweden managed to qualify to the European U21 Championship in the Czech Republic for the first time since 2004 after a successful qualification. In an exhibition game against Portugal U21 in early 2013, Augustinsson injured his knee and was later out for the rest of the year, which meant he missed most of the qualification games. He was however Håkan Ericson's first choice at the left-back position when he was available and was part of the squad in the games of 2014.

Augustinsson played every game in the group stage of the main tournament. Before the second game against England, in which Sweden lost, interest from Liverpool was reported.

Sweden however managed to advance from the group, thanks to winning against Italy and drawing against Portugal. After knocking out Denmark in the semi-final by 4–1, Sweden were to play Portugal again in the final. In a goalless match, the first kept clean sheet of Sweden in the tournament, the final had to be decided by a penalty shoot-out. Augustinsson scored his penalty and Sweden won by 4–3. He received international praise for his final performance, described as "outstanding". He earned a spot in The Guardian's 'Team of the Tournament'.

=== Senior national team ===
Augustinsson debuted with the senior team in January 2015, when he started both games in their friendlies against the Ivory Coast and Finland. Sportbladet rated him as the best Swedish player of those two games.

He received his second call-up in March 2016, playing 90 minutes in Sweden's 2–1 loss against Turkey. On 11 May, Erik Hamrén announced that Augustinsson was going to feature the Euro 2016 squad.

==== 2016–present ====
He remained as unused substitute, behind Martin Olsson, throughout Sweden's disappointing group stage at Euro 2016. Following Hamréns resignation and Janne Andersson's arrival later that summer, Augustinsson got bigger competition when Oscar Wendt re-joined the squad after conflicts with the former head coach. With Andersson's experimenting of the two veterans at the left-back position in the beginning of the World Cup qualification, Augustinsson opened possibilities to join the Sweden under-21 squad, for which he still was eligible to play. Andersson however kept him in the senior squad and Augustinsson came to play the final 30 minutes against Bulgaria in the qualifier in October.

In May 2018 he was named in Sweden's 23-man squad for the 2018 FIFA World Cup in Russia, where he notably scored the opener in Sweden's 3–0 win against Mexico.

== Style of play ==
Augustinsson is often referred as a modern wing-back, whose qualities is in his offense, possession, pace and a good left foot. He started out as a central midfielder, but changed position to left-back at age eleven due to tough competition in the midfield. He has always been a specialist in set pieces and takes a lot of corners and freekicks. His role models on the football pitch is former left back Gareth Bale and David Alaba.

== Personal life ==
Ludwig is the firstborn and grew up in a sports-oriented family in the central parts of Stockholm. His father Hans played football in Swedish Division 1 and his mother Elisabeth played volleyball on an international level for Sweden. His younger brother Jonathan Augustinsson also plays professional football as a left-back.

The family was part of a nationwide debate in the summer of 2015, about more Swedish national players coming from well-educated families in wealthier neighborhoods. Critics have stated that players like Augustinsson are successful today because of the amount of money the families invest in private training sessions.

Together with his good friends and former teammates from his time in Brommapojkarna, John Guidetti and Simon Tibbling, Augustinsson does not drink alcohol. Ludwig attended primary schools Aspuddens skola and Nybohovsskolan, both with focus on football.

While he has played football since childhood, he also played ice hockey for AIK IF during his youth. He is a supporter of Manchester United and has expressed an interest in playing for the club.

=== Modeling ===
In December 2015, Augustinsson featured in NLY Man's Christmas campaign "The Next Generation".

== Career statistics ==
=== Club ===
As of match played 18 October 2026

Appearances and goals by club, season and competition
Club	Season	League			National cup (Note: Includes Svenska Cupen, Danish Cup, DFB-Pokal, Copa del Rey, FA Cup, Belgian Cup)		League cup (Note: Includes EFL Cup)		Continental		Other		Total	
Club	Season	Division	Apps	Goals	Apps	Goals	Apps	Goals	Apps	Goals	Apps	Goals	Apps	Goals
IF Brommapojkarna	2011	Superettan	3	0	1	0	—		—		—		4	0
IF Brommapojkarna	2012	Superettan	27	2	0	0	—		—		—		27	2
IF Brommapojkarna	Total		30	2	1	0	—		—		—		31	2
IFK Göteborg	2013	Allsvenskan	1	0	3	0	—		0	0	—		4	0
IFK Göteborg	2014	Allsvenskan	28	1	5	0	—		5 (Note: Appearance(s) in UEFA Europa League)	0	—		38	1
IFK Göteborg	Total		29	1	8	0	—		5	0	—		42	1
Copenhagen	2014–15	Danish Superliga	15	1	4	1	—		—		—		19	2
Copenhagen	2015–16	Danish Superliga	31	1	3	0	—		4	0	—		38	1
Copenhagen	2016–17	Danish Superliga	32	1	2	1	—		16 (Note: Twelve appearances in UEFA Champions League, four appearances in UEFA Europa League)	0	—		50	2
Copenhagen	Total		78	3	9	2	—		20	0	—		107	5
Werder Bremen	2017–18	Bundesliga	29	1	4	0	—		—		—		33	1
Werder Bremen	2018–19	Bundesliga	34	1	5	0	—		—		—		39	1
Werder Bremen	2019–20	Bundesliga	12	0	1	0	—		—		2 (Note: Appearance(s) in Bundesliga relegation play-offs)	1	15	1
Werder Bremen	2020–21	Bundesliga	23	0	5	0	—		—		—		28	0
Werder Bremen	Total		98	2	15	0	—		—		2	1	115	3
Sevilla	2021–22	La Liga	19	0	3	0	—		5 (Note: Three appearances in UEFA Champions League, two appearances in UEFA Europa League)	0	—		27	0
Aston Villa (loan)	2022–23	Premier League	3	0	1	0	1	0	—		—		5	0
Mallorca (loan)	2022–23	La Liga	4	0	—		—		—		—		4	0
Anderlecht (loan)	2023–24	Belgian Pro League	31	0	1	0	—		—		—		32	0
Anderlecht	2024–25	Belgian Pro League	24	1	3	0	—		9	2	—		37	3
Anderlecht	2025–26	Belgian Pro League	26	0	4	0	—		4 (Note: One appearance in UEFA Europa League, three appearance in UEFA Conference League)	0	—		34	0
Anderlecht	2026–27	Belgian Pro League	8	0	1	0	—		6	0	—		15	0
Anderlecht	Total		58	1	8	0	—		19	2	—		85	3
Career total			351	9	46	2	1	0	49	2	2	1	447	14

=== International ===
As of match played 5 September 2024

Appearances and goals by national team and year
National team	Year	Apps	Goals
Sweden	2015	2	0
Sweden	2016	4	0
Sweden	2017	8	0
Sweden	2018	10	1
Sweden	2019	4	0
Sweden	2020	2	0
Sweden	2021	12	1
Sweden	2022	8	0
Sweden	2023	3	0
Sweden	2024	3	0
Total		56	2

As of match played 5 September 2024.
Scores and results list Sweden's goal tally first, and the score column indicates the score after each Augustinsson goal.

List of international goals scored by Ludwig Augustinsson
No.	Date	Venue	Opponent	Score	Result	Competition
1	27 June 2018	Central Stadium, Yekaterinburg, Russia	Mexico	1–0	3–0	2018 FIFA World Cup
2	28 March 2021	Fadil Vokrri Stadium, Pristina, Kosovo	Kosovo	1–0	3–0	2022 FIFA World Cup qualification

== Honours ==
IFK Göteborg

- Svenska Cupen: 2012–13

Copenhagen

- Danish Superliga: 2015–16, 2016–17
- Danish Cup: 2014–15, 2015–16, 2016–17

Sweden U21

- UEFA European Under-21 Championship: 2015
