= Jacob Tjørnelund =

Danish footballer (born 1991)

Personal information
- Date of birth: 31 December 1991 (age 34)
- Place of birth: Haderslev, Denmark
- Height: 1.83 m (6 ft 0 in)
- Position: Left-back

Youth career
- Haderslev FK

Senior career*
Years	Team	Apps	(Gls)
2010–2014	SønderjyskE	21	(0)
2014–2023	Hobro	190	(8)
- * Club domestic league appearances and goals as of 14 December 2023

Jacob Tjørnelund (born 31 December 1991) is a Danish professional footballer who plays as a left-back.

== Career ==
Tjørnelund progressed through the youth academy of SønderjyskE, where he made his professional debut on 16 October 2010 at age 18 in a 1–0 home win over AaB in the Danish Superliga. He came on as a substitute for Kenneth Fabricius. After three years as part of the SønderjyskE first team, his contract expired in December 2013.

Despite interest from Dutch club De Graafschap where he had been on a trial, Tjørnelund, who was a free agent after his contract expired, signed a six-month contract with Hobro IK. After a successful first term at the club, where he helped them win promotion to the Superliga for first time in club history, he signed a two-year contract extension on 1 July 2014.

As his contract expired in 2017, Tjørnelund initially chose to leave Hobro but ultimately changed his decision and signed a contract extension. After 10 years of faithful service in Hobro, Tjørnelund retired from the club at the end of 2023.

== Honours ==
Hobro

- 1st Division: 2016–17
