= Lasse Lindbjerg =

Danish footballer (born 1992)

Personal information
- Full name: Lasse Lindbjerg
- Date of birth: 15 April 1992 (age 34)
- Place of birth: Denmark
- Height: 1.82 m (6 ft 0 in)
- Position: Centre-back

Youth career
- 1995–2004: Greve IF
- 2004–2006: Herfølge BK
- 2006–2009: Brøndby IF
- 2009–2010: FC Nordsjælland
- 2010–2012: FC Copenhagen

Senior career*
Years	Team	Apps	(Gls)
2012	FC Vestsjælland	2	(0)
2012–2014	BK Frem	54	(2)
2014–2015	F.C. Copenhagen	0	(0)
2015–2017	AB Tårnby		
2017–201?	BK Frem II		
2020	Greve IF	0	(0)

International career
2011	Denmark U20	2	(0)
- * Club domestic league appearances and goals

Lasse Lindbjerg (born 15 April 1992) is a Danish retired footballer, who played as a centre-back.

Lindbjerg has played for FC Vestsjælland, BK Frem, F.C. Copenhagen, AB Tårnby and Greve IF.

== Privat life ==
Lindbjerg was born in Roskilde Hospital. He has studied physical therapy.

== Club career ==
=== FC Vestsjælland ===
After Lindbjergs contract expired in January 2014, he joined FC Vestsjælland in February 2014. Lindbjerg reasoned his transfer to FCV with, that it was difficult to be an youth player in FC Copenhagen, because he didn't get the chance on the first team, to show his qualities.

After 5 months and only 2 league games for FCV, he left the club.

=== BK Frem ===
Lindbjerg joined BK Frem in the summer 2012. His first match for BK Frem was 12 August 2012 against Svebølle B&I, were Lindbjerg and BK Frem won 3–0.

=== FC Copenhagen ===
In August 2014, Lindbjerg returned to FC Copenhagen, after playing a few friendly matches for FC Copenhagens reserve team. The agreement between FC Copenhagen and Lindbjerg was, that he could train with the first team squad, but he would be playing for the reserves, and playing the cup matches for the first team.

Lindbjerg got extended his contract until the summer 2015, and got moved permanently into the first team squad.

=== AB Tårnby ===
After Lindbjerg didn't get his contract with FC Copenhagen extended, he signed a contract with new-promoted Danish 2nd Division club AB Tårnby· He wanted to play on a lower level, so he also could do his job as physiotherapist/physical trainer at the academy of FC Copenhagen.

=== BK Frem ===
Lindbjerg joined Boldklubben Frem in February 2017, where he was supposed to play for their second team alongside his job at F.C. Copenhagen as a physical coach for the youth teams.

=== Greve IF ===
During 2020, Lindbjerg played a few games for his former childhood club Greve IF. He made one official appearance in the Danish Cup, the rest of his appearances was in friendly games. He left the club again at the end of the year.

== Football physiotherapist ==
In June 2015, Lindbjerg started working as physiotherapist at the academy of FC Copenhagen, School of Excellence. He later also functioned as a physical coach and assistant coach in the youth sector.

In the 2018–19 season, he worked as a physiotherapist for the Danish Superliga team of Lyngby Boldklub, before returning to FC Copenhagen in the summer 2019.

== Honours ==
=== Club ===
Copenhagen

- Danish Cup: 2014–15
