= Steve De Ridder =

Belgian footballer (born 1987)

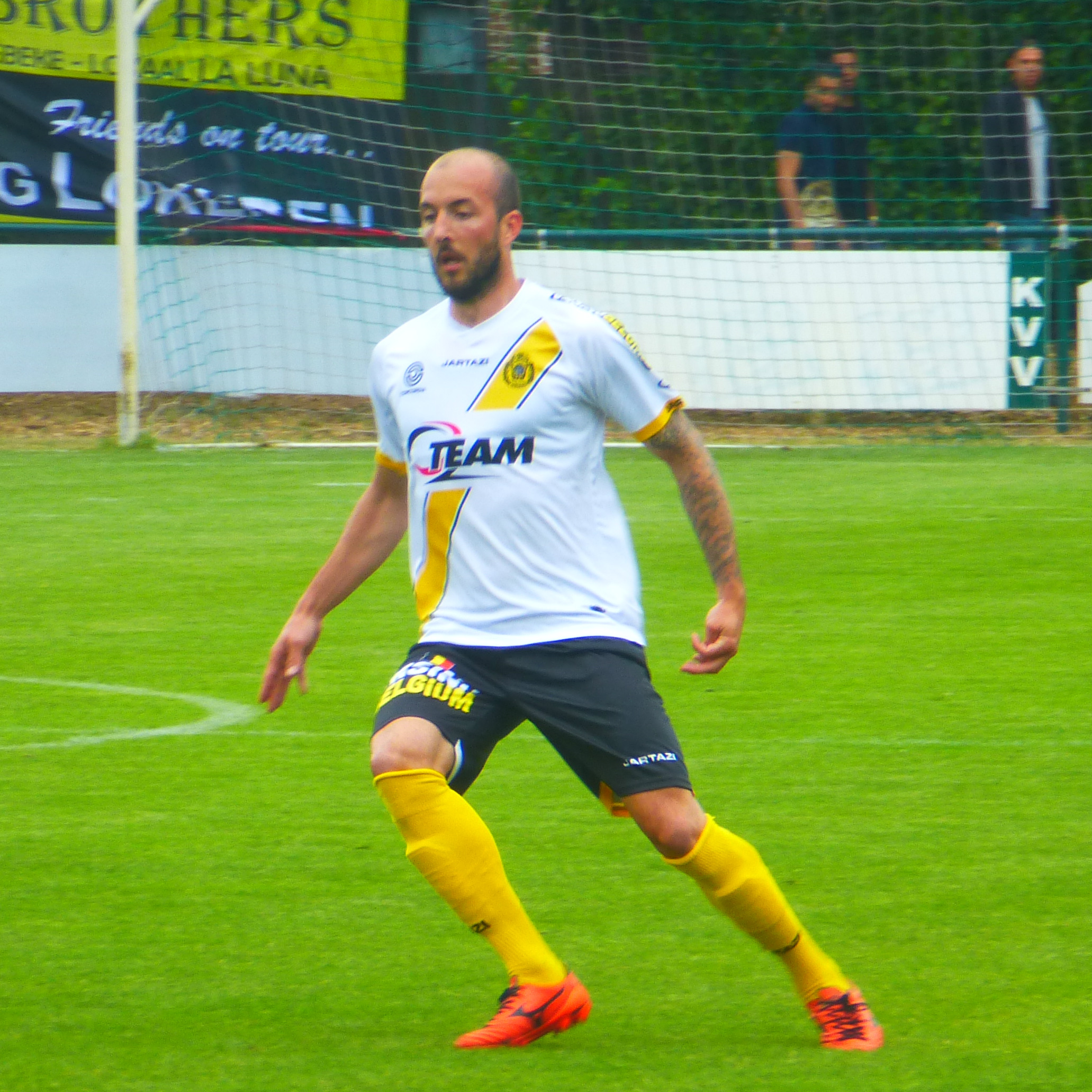

Personal information
- Full name: Steve Danny Marc De Ridder
- Date of birth: 25 February 1987 (age 39)
- Place of birth: Ghent, Belgium
- Height: 1.77 m (5 ft 10 in)
- Positions: Winger; forward

Youth career
- VSV Gent
- Lokeren
- Gent

Senior career*
Years	Team	Apps	(Gls)
2004–2008	Gent	1	(0)
2006–2008	→ Hamme (loan)	50	(22)
2008–2011	De Graafschap	93	(12)
2011–2013	Southampton	36	(3)
2013	→ Bolton Wanderers (loan)	3	(0)
2013–2014	Utrecht	33	(10)
2014–2016	Copenhagen	21	(2)
2015–2016	→ Zulte Waregem (loan)	37	(5)
2016–2019	Lokeren	94	(10)
2019–2023	Sint-Truiden	49	(2)
2022–2023	→ Deinze (loan)	23	(0)
2023–2024	Deinze	20	(0)
Total		460	(66)

International career
2005	Belgium U18	2	(0)
2005–2006	Belgium U19	11	(2)
2007–2008	Belgium U20	2	(0)
- * Club domestic league appearances and goals

Steve Danny Marc De Ridder (born 25 February 1987) is a Belgian former professional footballer who played as a winger.

He has played in the Netherlands for De Graafschap and FC Utrecht and in England for Southampton and Bolton Wanderers. He was born in Ghent.

== Club career ==
=== De Graafschap ===
He was awarded the player of the season award for the 2010–11 season.

=== Southampton ===
On 22 July 2011, he joined Southampton from De Graafschap for a significant undisclosed fee on a three-year deal. He made his league debut coming on as a second-half substitute, replacing David Connolly against Leeds United on 6 August 2011. On 9 August 2011, he made his full debut in the League Cup first round, scoring the first goal in a 4–1 victory over Torquay United. On 28 September 2011, he scored his first league goal in a 2–1 loss to Cardiff City. On 22 October 2011, he scored a late equaliser in a 1–1 draw at Reading after coming on as a substitute.

He left the club on 1 August 2013, having his contract cancelled by mutual consent.

==== Bolton Wanderers loan ====
On 31 January 2013, De Ridder joined Bolton Wanderers on an initial one-month loan deal. He made his debut two days later, coming on as a second-half substitute for Chris Eagles, in Bolton's 2–1 defeat at Watford. On 4 March 2013, his loan spell ended and he returned to his parent club.

=== FC Utrecht ===
On 1 August 2013, De Ridder signed a three-year contract with FC Utrecht.

=== FC Copenhagen ===
In May 2014 De Ridder made a move to F.C. Copenhagen. He made his Danish Superliga debut on 20 July in a match against Silkeborg IF.

His contract was terminated at 19 August 2016.

=== Sint-Truiden ===
On 27 August 2019 he signed with Sint-Truiden.

=== Deinze ===
On 7 September 2022, De Ridder was loaned by Deinze. On 6 April 2023, De Ridder agreed to join Deinze on a permanent basis and signed a two-year contract. He left the club in December 2024 after Deinze was declared bankrupt and ceased operations.

== Honours ==
De Graafschap

- Eerste Divisie: 2009–10

Southampton

- Football League Championship runners-up: 2011–12

Copenhagen

- Danish Cup: 2014–15
