= Mikkel Wohlgemuth =

Danish footballer (born 1995)

Personal information
- Date of birth: 4 June 1995 (age 31)
- Place of birth: Copenhagen, Denmark
- Height: 1.79 m (5 ft 10 in)
- Position: Midfielder

Team information
- Current team: B.93
- Number: 6

Youth career
- Fremad Amager
- Copenhagen

Senior career*
Years	Team	Apps	(Gls)
2013–2015	Copenhagen	2	(0)
2015–2018	HB Køge	95	(5)
2018–2021	Vendsyssel	73	(4)
2022–2024	Fredericia	56	(5)
2024–	B.93	60	(12)

International career
2010–2011	Denmark U16	6	(0)
2012	Denmark U17	5	(0)
2012–2013	Denmark U18	5	(0)
2012–2014	Denmark U19	9	(1)
2013	Denmark U20	3	(0)
- * Club domestic league appearances and goals as of 3 October 2026

Mikkel Wohlgemuth (born 4 June 1995) is a Danish professional footballer who plays as a midfielder for Danish 2nd Division club B.93.

== Career ==
Wohlgemuth played his youth years and first senior years at FC Copenhagen. Wohlgemuth was a part of Copenhagen's 2013–14 UEFA Youth League campaign, where he went to score against Juventus and Real Madrid, both at home.

Wohlgemuth made his Superliga debut on 16 May 2013, as he was in the starting lineup away against Randers FC.

On 2 June 2014, Wohlgemuth suffered an anterior cruciate ligament injury in a match for the Denmark under-19 national team against Germany. The injury is expected to keep him out the game for the rest of the year. He was anyway promoted to the first team of F.C. Copenhagen on 27 June 2014.

After playing for HB Køge for three years, Wohlgemuth signed with Vendsyssel FF in August 2018, who had just won promotion to the Superliga. There, he suffered a series of injuries, sidelining him for more than a year. He made his comeback in October 2020, where he provided an assist to Jakob Hjorth in a 1–1 draw against Fredericia. He left the club at the end of the 2020–21 season at the end of his contract. However, he signed a new two-year deal with Vendsyssel on 20 July 2021. On 26 June 2022 it was confirmed, that Wohlgemuth had signed a two-year contract with fellow league club, FC Fredericia.

On 28 May 2024, B.93 confirmed that they had signed Wohlgemuth on a deal until June 2025.

== Honours ==
FC Copenhagen

- Danish Superliga: 2012–13
- Danish Cup: 2014–15
