= Franco Mussis =

Argentine footballer (born 1992)

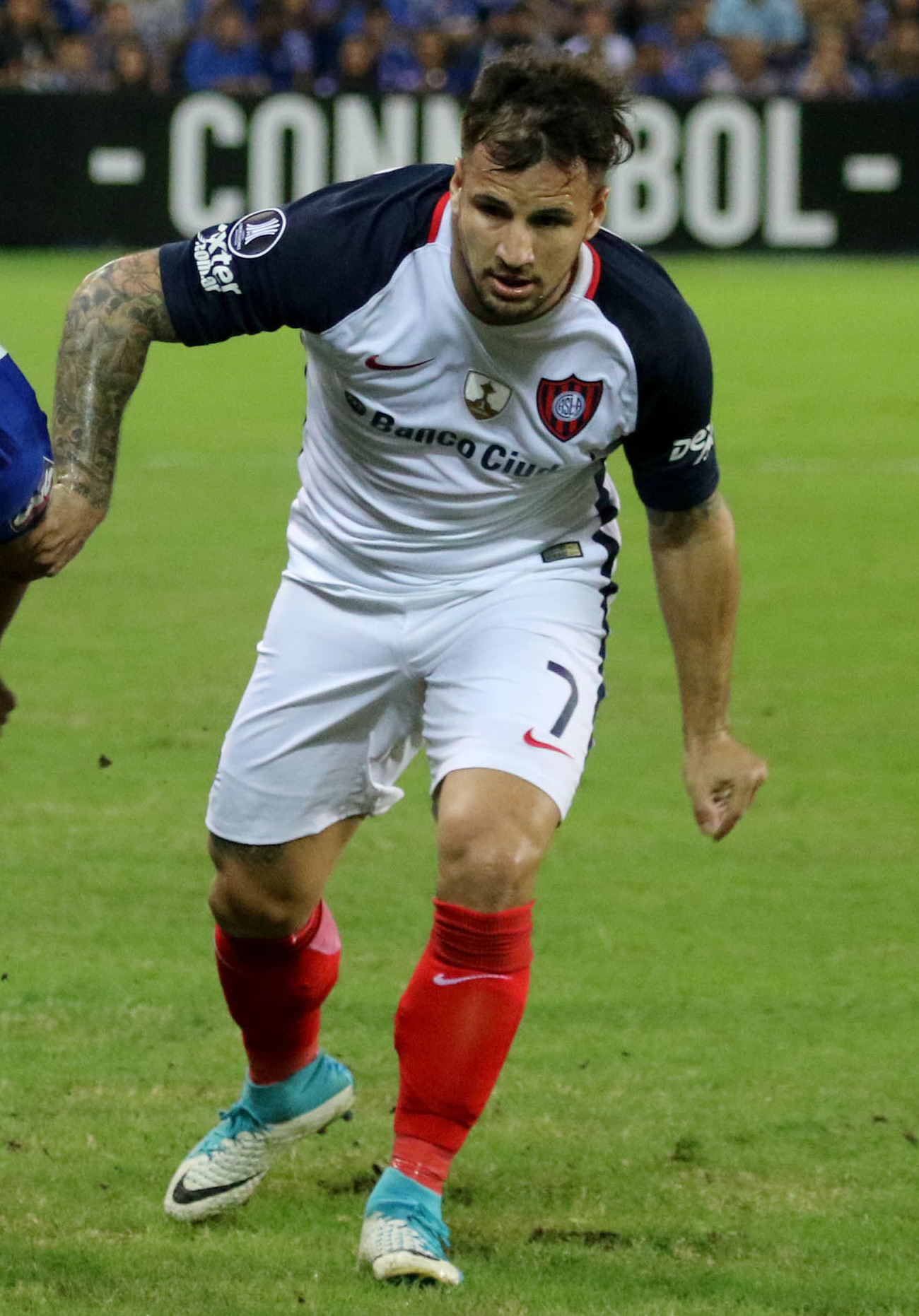
- Mussis with San Lorenzo at the 2017 Copa Libertadores

Personal information
- Full name: Franco Gabriel Mussis
- Date of birth: 19 April 1992 (age 34)
- Place of birth: La Plata, Argentina
- Height: 1.74 m (5 ft 9 in)
- Position: Midfielder

Team information
- Current team: Universidad de Concepción
- Number: 5

Youth career
- Gimnasia LP

Senior career*
Years	Team	Apps	(Gls)
2012–2014	Gimnasia LP	77	(3)
2014	Copenhagen	1	(0)
2014	→ Genoa (loan)	1	(0)
2015–2018	San Lorenzo	59	(3)
2019–2020	Gimnasia LP	18	(0)
2020–2022	Atlético Tucumán	34	(2)
2022	Botoșani	12	(0)
2023	Montevarchi	9	(0)
2024	Ferro Carril Oeste	30	(0)
2025–	Universidad de Concepción	6	(0)
- * Club domestic league appearances and goals as of 9 November 2025

Franco Gabriel Mussis (born 19 April 1992) is an Argentine professional footballer who plays as a midfielder for Chilean club Universidad de Concepción.

== Career ==
=== Gimnasia La Plata ===
Mussis joined Gimnasia La Plata in the youth years. He received his first team debut on 15 April 2012 away against Gimnasia de Jujuy in the Primera B Nacional, after replacing Nicolas Alejandro Cabrera in the 74th minute. Despite not having many matches, Mussis became an undisputed pillar of the team. He scored his first goal on 10 March 2013 against Club Olimpo in a 3–0 victory. He was a permanent part of the Gimnasia La Plata team, won promotion to the Primera División on 28 May 2013 at the Estadio Mario Alberto Kempes.

On 8 December 2013 he scored his first Primera División goal in an away 1–1 draw against Boca Juniors.

=== Copenhagen ===
Mussis' performances in Gimnasia led to a transfer to Danish Superliga side Copenhagen, which was announced on 31 January 2014 and was effectuated after the 2013–14 season. He received a 5-year contract.

==== Loan to Genoa ====
However, due to difficulties for Mussis to adapt in Copenhagen regarding to language, culture and training, as well as Mussis not arriving in Copenhagen in as good physical shape as expected, he went on a season long loan to Genoa on 23 August 2014.

=== San Lorenzo ===
On 6 January 2015, Copenhagen and Genoa agreed on ending the loan deal 6 months early. Meanwhile, Mussis was sold to the Argentinian club San Lorenzo for an undisclosed figure.

=== Return to Gimnasia La Plata ===
Mussis returned to Gimnasia (LP), signing for the club on 4 January 2019.

=== Botoșani ===
In the summer of 2022, Mussis joined Liga I club Botoșani.

=== Montevarchi ===
On 31 January 2023, Mussis signed with Montevarchi in the Italian third-tier Serie C.

=== Universidad de Concepción ===
In August 2025, Mussis moved to Chile and joined Universidad de Concepción in the Liga de Ascenso, winning the league title.

== Honours ==
San Lorenzo

- Supercopa Argentina: 2015

Universidad de Concepción

- Primera B de Chile: 2025
