= Per Nilsson (footballer) =

Swedish footballer

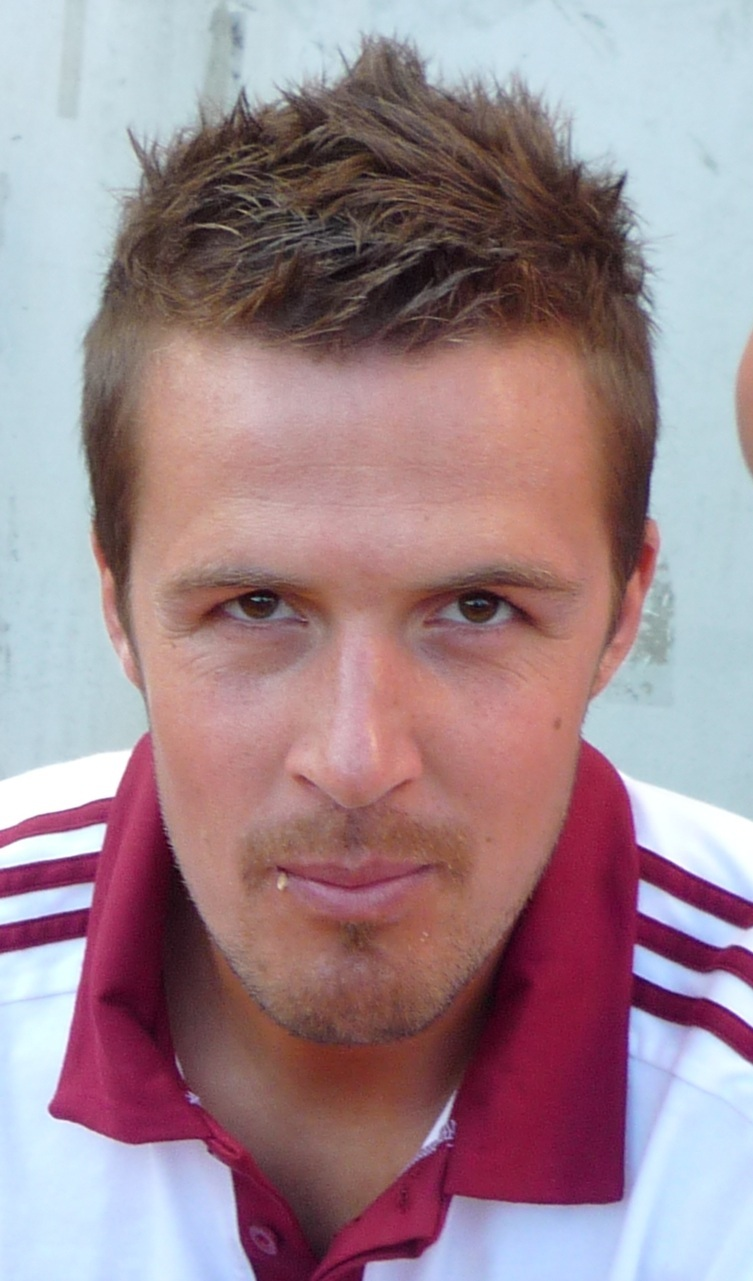
- Nilsson at Nürnberg in 2011.

Personal information
- Full name: Per Jörgen Nilsson
- Date of birth: 15 September 1982 (age 44)
- Place of birth: Härnösand, Sweden
- Height: 1.90 m (6 ft 3 in)
- Position: Centre-back

Youth career
- 1988–1991: Stigsjö IK
- 1992–1997: IFK Timrå

Senior career*
Years	Team	Apps	(Gls)
1998	IFK Timrå	10	(6)
1999–2001	GIF Sundsvall	41	(1)
2001–2004	AIK	66	(3)
2005–2007	Odd Grenland	58	(7)
2007–2010	1899 Hoffenheim	45	(0)
2010–2014	1. FC Nürnberg	73	(10)
2014–2016	Copenhagen	21	(0)
Total		314	(27)

International career
1998–1999	Sweden U16	14	(1)
2000	Sweden U18	5	(1)
2001–2004	Sweden U21	22	(1)
2001–2014	Sweden	16	(0)
- * Club domestic league appearances and goals

Per Jörgen Nilsson (born 15 September 1982) is a Swedish former professional footballer who played as a centre-back. Starting off his career with IFK Timrå in 1998, he went on to represent GIF Sundsvall, AIK, Odd Greenland, 1899 Hoffenheim, and 1. FC Nürnberg before retiring at F.C. Copenhagen in 2016. A full international between 2001 and 2016, he won 16 caps for the Sweden national team.

== Club career ==
=== Sweden ===
Nilsson was born in Härnösand and started his career in Stigsjö IK youth team in 1988, staying with the club until 1991 when he made a move to IFK Timrå, mainly being part of the club's youth team he then made his debut for the club in 1998, this attracted attention from GIF Sundsvall, who signed the player prior to the 1999 season. During his time in GIF Sundsvall he helped the club up to Allsvenskan in 1999. Nilsson's playing in Sundsvall had again attracted attention, this time from Allsvenska AIK, who made a deal with GIF Sundsvall that Per Nilsson would move to the club prior to the 2002 season in 2001, however due to a series of different circumstances, as several key players left AIK, made AIK change the deal so that he could join the club already in the autumn of 2001. Following his debut against IFK Norrköping he quickly established himself as a regular central defender, however a series of manager changes and other events made Per feel that he could not perform at top level.

=== Norway and Germany ===
Following AIK's poor performance during the 2004 season saw the club relegated from Allsvenskan and Per Nilsson leave the club for Norwegian club Odd Grenland for approximately 3 million Norwegian kroner. Odd Grenland rejected a £1 million offer from English side Sunderland AFC in August 2006. It was widely expected that he would leave for a bigger club, however no bids came until 13 July 2007 when it was announced that Nilsson signed a contract with 2. Bundesliga team 1899 Hoffenheim. On 14 July 2010, Hoffenheim confirmed that they had sold Nilsson to Bundesliga rivals 1. FC Nürnberg.

On 23 March 2014, the Danish club FC Copenhagen announced that they had signed Nilsson on a three-year contract. On 15 December 2016, Nilsson officially announced his retirement as a player.

In January 2017, RB Leipzig announced that Nilsson would be the assistant to sporting director Ralf Rangnick for the 2017/18 season. As such, he initially took on tasks in team management for the first team. Since July 2018 he has been the sporting director of the U16 to U19.

== International career ==
Nilsson won a total of 16 caps for Sweden between 2001 and 2014.

== Honours ==
Copenhagen

- Danish Superliga: 2015–16
- Danish Cup: 2014–15, 2015–16

Sweden

- King's Cup: 2003

Individual

- Kniksen award: Defender of the Year in 2006
- Verdens Gang Norwegian Premier League Player of the Year: 2006
