= Mads Aaquist =

Danish footballer (born 1994)

Personal information
- Full name: Mads Hinrichsen Aaquist
- Date of birth: 31 December 1994 (age 31)
- Place of birth: Herlev, Denmark
- Height: 1.76 m (5 ft 9 in)
- Positions: Midfielder; right-back

Youth career
- 1999–2006: B.1973
- 2006–2013: Copenhagen

Senior career*
Years	Team	Apps	(Gls)
2013–2015	Copenhagen	1	(0)
2014–2015	→ Horsens (loan)	6	(0)
2015–2017	Helsingør	60	(9)
2017–2019	Nordsjælland	19	(0)
2018–2019	→ Randers (loan)	23	(2)
2019–2022	Viborg	58	(6)
2022–2024	Fremad Amager	38	(2)

International career
2009–2010	Denmark U16	5	(0)
2010–2011	Denmark U17	15	(0)
2011–2012	Denmark U18	8	(0)
2012–2014	Denmark U19	12	(0)
2013	Denmark U20	4	(0)
- * Club domestic league appearances and goals as of 19:14, 1 July 2024 (UTC)

Mads Hinrichsen Aaquist (born 31 December 1994) is a Danish professional footballer who plays as a midfielder or right-back.

== Club career ==
=== Copenhagen ===
Aaquist is a product of F.C. Copenhagen's youth sector. He began playing for the first team in the winter 2012/13 and played several friendly matches for the club. He expressed at this point to the medias, that he would wish he was a permanent part of the first team. Aaquist gained his first Danish Superliga match and official debut for FCK on 20 May 2013, when he replaced Christian Bolaños in the final match of the season, a home game against SønderjyskE.

Just hours after the announcement of his return to FCK, it was further announced, that FCK had terminated his contract.

==== Loan to AC Horsens ====
In the autumn 2014, he was loaned out to AC Horsens for the rest of the season. Aaquist played his first match for the club on 27 July 2014 against Viborg FF. However, Aaquist was struggling to get playtime and did only play 6 matches. AC Horsens announced on 21 January 2015, that they had sent Aaquist return to FCK six months earlier than expected.

=== FC Helsingør ===
On 21 January 2015, Aaquist signed with FC Helsingør on a free transfer. He signed a contract until the summer 2015, and later extended his contract after playing 14 league games for the club in his first 6 months. He got his debut for FC Helsingør on 26 July 2015. Aaquist started on the bench, but replaced Jonas Hebo Rasmussen in the 60th minute in a 0–3 defeat against FC Roskilde in the Danish 1st Division.

The defender extended his contract for three years in May 2016. He played 27 league matches in his first season at the club.

=== Nordsjælland ===
Aaquist signed for FC Nordsjælland on 22 August 2017.

=== Randers ===
Aaquist joined Randers FC on 23 August 2018 on loan until 30 June 2019.

=== Viborg ===
After his loan spell with Randers FC, Aaquist returned to FC Nordsjælland and started in the first five league games. However, he moved to Viborg FF in the Danish 1st Division on 22 August 2019, where he signed a three-year deal.

=== Fremad Amager ===
On 31 January 2022, Aaquist joined fellow league club Fremad Amager on a deal for the rest of the season. He left the club in June 2024.

== Position ==
Aaquist used to play as a fullback, mostly on the right side, but in the 2016/17 season, he mostly played as a left or right midfielder. He even played in the central midfield the whole match against Vejle Boldklub in May 2017.

== Honours ==
Copenhagen

- Danish Superliga: 2012–13

Viborg

- Danish 1st Division: 2020–21
