= Yones Felfel =

Danish footballer

Personal information
- Full name: Yones Olíver Felfel
- Date of birth: 24 November 1995 (age 30)
- Place of birth: Denmark
- Height: 1.82 m (6 ft 0 in)
- Position: Forward

Youth career
- HIK
- Copenhagen

Senior career*
| Years | Team | Apps | (Gls) |
| 2014–2015 | Copenhagen | 8 | (0) |
| 2015 | Vestsjælland | 9 | (1) |
| 2016–2018 | Vaduz | 1 | (0) |
| 2019–2021 | HIK | 15 | (2) |

International career
| 2010 | Denmark U16 | 1 | (0) |
| 2014–2015 | Denmark U19 | 4 | (0) |
| 2014 | Denmark U20 | 1 | (0) |
- * Club domestic league appearances and goals as of 19:03, 30 June 2021 (UTC)

Yones Felfel (born 24 November 1995) is a Danish footballer, playing as forward.

== Club career ==
=== F.C. Copenhagen ===
Felfel was a part of F.C. Copenhagen's 2013–14 UEFA Youth League campaign, where he went to score against Juventus away and Real Madrid at home.

In the winter break of the 2013–14 season, Felfel was promoted to the first team. He gained his first Superliga match on 14 March 2014, when he replaced Thomas Kristensen in an away game against SønderjyskE.

Felfel scored his first goal for FCK, in the Danish Cup, on 4 December 2014 against Greve Fodbold.

=== FC Vestsjælland ===
On 11 August 2015, Felfel signed a 2-year contract with FC Vestsjælland.

=== Return to HIK ===
In January 2019, Felfel returned to his former youth club Hellerup IK playing in the Danish 2nd Division. He left the club at the end of 2021.

== Honours ==
=== Club ===
Copenhagen

- Danish Superliga: 2015–16
- Danish Cup: 2014–15

FC Vaduz

- Liechtenstein Football Cup: 2016-17
