= Marvin Pourié =

German footballer (born 1991)

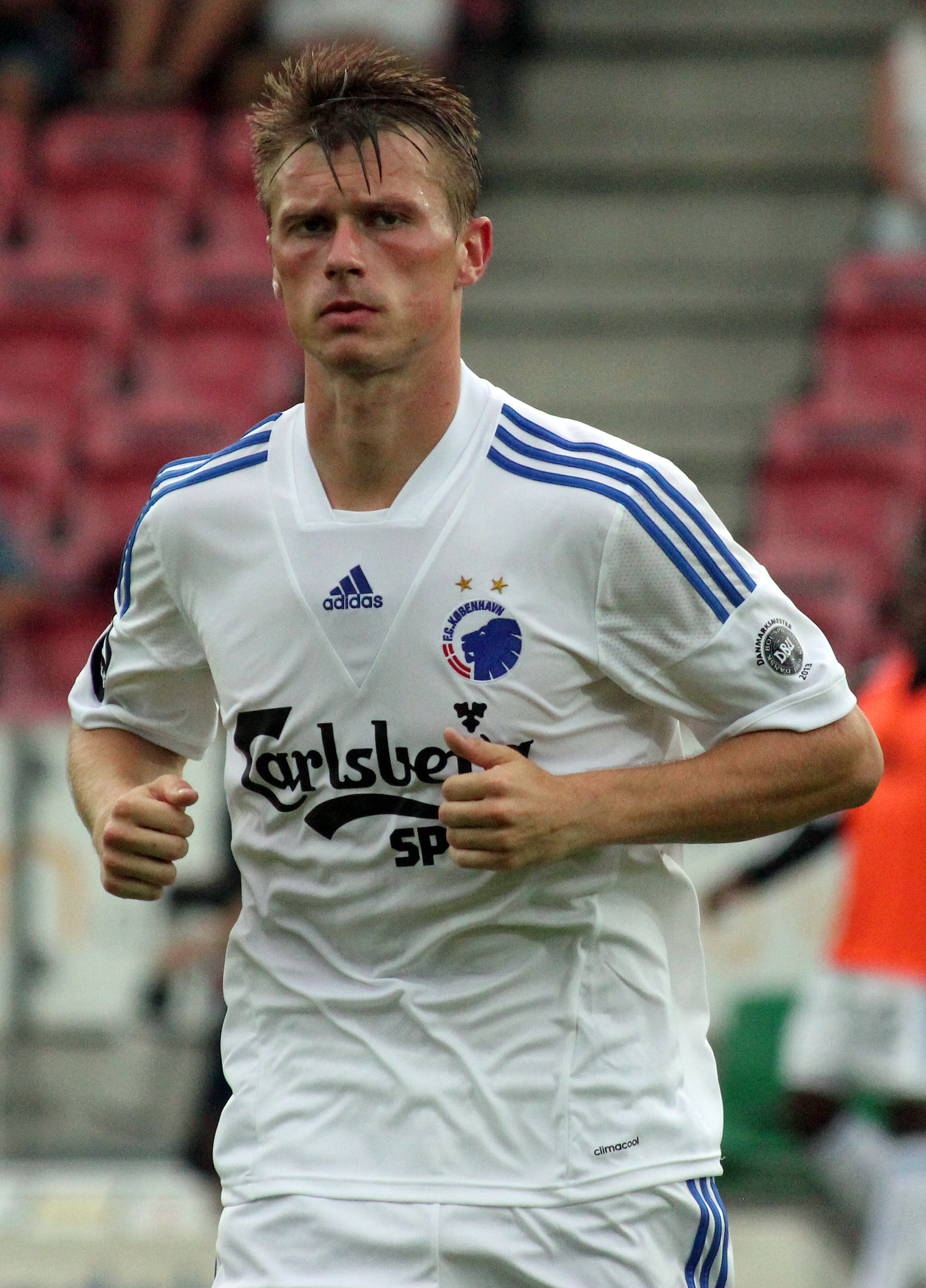
- Pourié playing for Copenhagen in 2013

Personal information
- Date of birth: 8 January 1991 (age 35)
- Place of birth: Werne, Germany
- Height: 1.84 m (6 ft 0 in)
- Position: Forward

Youth career
- SSV Werne
- Werner SC
- –2002: TuRa Bergkamen
- 2002–2005: Borussia Dortmund
- 2005–2006: Hammer SpVgg
- 2006–2008: Liverpool

Senior career*
Years	Team	Apps	(Gls)
2009–2011	Schalke 04	0	(0)
2009	→ 1860 Munich (loan)	4	(0)
2009–2010	→ 1860 Munich II (loan)	6	(1)
2010	→ TuS Koblenz (loan)	14	(1)
2010–2011	Schalke 04 II	21	(5)
2011–2013	Silkeborg IF	55	(23)
2013–2016	Copenhagen	15	(2)
2014	→ Zulte Waregem (loan)	6	(1)
2014–2015	→ SønderjyskE (loan)	26	(9)
2015–2016	→ Ufa (loan)	11	(1)
2016–2018	Randers FC	48	(11)
2018–2021	Karlsruher SC	66	(27)
2020	→ Eintracht Braunschweig (loan)	18	(4)
2020–2021	→ 1. FC Kaiserslautern (loan)	33	(11)
2021–2022	Würzburger Kickers	27	(8)
2022–2023	SV Meppen	37	(11)
2023–2024	Roda JC	5	(0)
2024	VSG Altglienicke	15	(8)
2024–2025	Rot Weiss Ahlen	21	(15)
2025–2026	Barockstadt Fulda-Lehnerz	20	(3)

International career
2007–2008	Germany U18	9	(3)
- * Club domestic league appearances and goals as of 26 June 2026

Marvin Pourié (born 8 January 1991) is a German professional footballer who plays as a forward.

== Club career ==
Pourié arrived at the Liverpool Academy from Borussia Dortmund in the summer of 2007 and scored 12 goals in his first year with the Under-18s.

=== Schalke 04 and loans ===
On 5 January 2009, Pourié transferred back to Germany, signing a contract with first division club Schalke 04. His contract with Schalke was due to end on 30 June 2013.

Immediately after arriving at Schalke he was loaned out to 2. Bundesliga club TSV 1860 Munich until the end of the 2010–11 season.

Schalke general manager Andreas Müller said of the new striker: "Marvin is a talented player who will now get some match practice at a higher level. The aim is for him to find his feet in the professional game and hopefully he'll come on well. Schalke and 1860 Munich are great clubs with a long tradition. I'm delighted the move has worked out. My aim is to play as many games as possible."

Pourié made his professional debut in a third round 2008–09 DFB-Pokal match for 1860 Munich against Hamburger SV on 27 January 2009. He made his league debut on 22 February 2009, starting in a 4–1 loss in the 2. Bundesliga to MSV Duisburg.

After several undisciplined acts, Pourié was dropped from the squad on 24 April 2009 by then coach Uwe Wolf. When he was then sacked with two games to go and replaced by Ewald Lienen, Pourié returned to the squad, but he did not make it into the 18 players nominated for the remaining matches. On 31 August 2009, he returned on loan to 1860 Munich, but he would only play for the under-19-team in the U-19-Bundesliga. On 27 January 2010, his club 1860 Munich terminated his contract and Pourie returned to Schalke 04. A day later, Schalke loaned him out again, this time to TuS Koblenz.

=== Silkeborg ===
In June 2011, Pourié signed a three-year contract with Silkeborg IF and thereby moved to Danish Superliga.

=== F.C. Copenhagen and loans ===
In July 2013, Pourié signed a four-year contract with F.C. Copenhagen, after playing for Silkeborg IF for two years.

On 27 January, Pourié came to a loan agreement with Belgian Pro League side S.V. Zulte Waregem, joining until the summer 2014. He made his debut for Zulte Waregem on 29 January, scoring the only goal in a cupmatch against KAA Gent

On 21 May 2015, Pourié scored a hat-trick to help SønderjyskE defeat Esbjerg fB 2–3. As his loan spell with SønderjyskE came to an end, he rejoined F.C. Copenhagen in the summer of 2015. He scored two goals away against Newtown and three days later he scored the opening goal of the 2–1 win, away, against Esbjerg fB.

In August 2015 he was loaned again, this time to FC Ufa. He struggled to integrate into the team in the first half of the season, being rotated in and out of the starting XI alongside Haris Handžić and Vyacheslav Krotov.

=== Karlsruher SC ===
In January 2018, Pourié returned to Germany, joining Karlsruher SC from Randers FC.

On 21 January 2020, Pourié joined Eintracht Braunschweig on loan for the rest of the 2019–20 season.

In August he moved to 1. FC Kaiserslautern on loan for the 2020–21 season with 1. FC Kaiserslautern securing an option to sign him permanently.

=== Roda JC ===
On 12 August 2023, Pourié signed a one-year contract at Dutch Eerste Divisie club Roda JC. He made his debut for the club on 6 October, replacing Arjen van der Heide in the 77th minute of a 3–1 victory against Jong AZ. On 25 January 2024, Pourié's contract with Roda was terminated by mutual consent.

=== Rot Weiss Ahlen ===
On 23 October 2024, Pourié signed with Rot Weiss Ahlen until the end of the 2024–25 season.

== International career ==
Pourié was a member of the Germany U-18 team, playing nine games and scoring three goals.

== Honours ==
Individual

- 3. Liga Player of the Season: 2019–20
