= 2014–15 Danish Cup =

DBU Pokalen (The DBU Cup)

Tournament details
- Country: Denmark

Final positions
- Champions: Copenhagen
- Runners-up: Vestsjælland

The 2014–15 Danish Cup was the 61st season of the Danish Cup competition. It was the fourth season since its rebranding as the DBU Pokalen (The DBU Cup). The winner of the competition qualified for the second qualifying round of the 2015–16 UEFA Europa League.

== First round ==
98 teams were drawn into this round. Matches were played on 2, 12, 13 and 19 August 2014.

Team 1	Score	Team 2
2 August 2014
Avedøre (3)	1–1 (a.e.t.) (5–4 p)	NB Bornholm (4)
12 August 2014
Marstal/Rise (4)	0–0 (a.e.t.) (5–4 p)	Sydvest 05 (3)
Vojens B&IF (6)	0–1	Næsby BK (3)
Glamsbjerg IF (6)	0–6	FC Sønderborg (4)
Middelfart G&BK (3)	1–1 (a.e.t.) (4–5 p)	BK Marienlyst (3)
Søndersø Boldklub (6)	0–3	Esbjerg IF 92 (5)
KSC Harte (5)	0–4	Vejle Boldklub (2)
Viby IF (4)	1–4	AC Horsens (2)
Aabyhøj IF (5)	2–4	Aarhus Fremad (4)
IF Lyseng (4)	4–1	FC Djursland (4)
Herning KFUM (10)	0–8	Odder IGF (3)
Vejlby IK Fodbold (7)	0–3	IK Skovbakken (3)
B73 Slagelse (7)	2–0	Ringsted IF (4)
Kalundborg GB (4)	4–2	Boldklubben Frem Sakskøbing (5)
Ledøje-Smørum Fodbold (4)	4–1	Rishøj Boldklub (3)
Boldklubben Rødovre (5)	2–1	Frederiksberg Alliancen 2000 (4)
Skovshoved IF (5)	0–1	Hvidovre IF (3)
Blovstrød IF (6)	1–9	Brønshøj BK (2)
FC Lejre (5)	4–3	Vanløse IF (4)
Gilleleje FK (8)	2–0	Boldklubben B 77 (7)
VB 1968 (6)	0–2	BK Søllerød-Vedbæk (3)
Hedensted BK (5)	1–4	Ringkøbing IF (3)
Morud IF (5)	1–2	Kolding Boldklub (3)
Lindholm IF (4)	3–3 (a.e.t.) (4–2 p)	Thisted FC (3)
RKG FC (7)	1–2	Vejgaard B (5)
SC Egedal (4)	3–2	IF Skjold Birkerød (4)
Holstebro BK (4)	0–1	Kjellerup IF (3)
13 August 2014
Hellerup IK (3)	2–1	Boldklubben Frem (3)
Nyborg (6)	0–5	Varde IF (3)
Kolding IF (3)	0–4	FC Fredericia (2)
Skalbjerg Vissenbjerg (6)	0–1	OKS Odense (6)
Maribo BK (5)	0–7	Nykøbing FC (3)
Herlev IF (3)	5–4	Gentofte-Vangede (3)
BK Avarta (3)	0–2	Lyngby Boldklub (2)
Hirtshals BK (5)	0–3	Jammerbugt FC (3)
Brabrand IF (3)	3–2 (a.e.t.)	FC Skanderborg (4)
FC Helsingør (3)	0–3	Fremad Amager (3)
Boldklubben Hellas (6)	0–8	FC Roskilde (2)
Jægersborg BK (4)	0–3	B.93 (3)
Taastrup FC (4)	0–8	AB (2)
Tarup Paarup IF (5)	2–4 (a.e.t.)	FC Svendborg (3)
FB (5)	0–3	Greve Fodbold (4)
Skive IK (2)	2–0	Vendsyssel FF (2)
Nakskov BK (5)	1–7	Svebølle B&I (3)
Holbæk B&I (3)	1–1 (a.e.t.) (4–5 p)	B 1908 (3)
19 August 2014
FC Randoms (8)	0–10	Tårnby Boldklub (4)
20 August 2014
Viborg FF (2)	0–2	AGF Aarhus (2)
27 August 2014
Næstved BK (3)	1–2	HB Køge (2)

== Second round ==
56 teams were drawn into this round. Matches were played on 27 August, 10, 16, 23, 24 and 30 September 2014.

Team 1	Score	Team 2
27 August 2014
Svebølle B&I (3)	1–5	Vestsjælland (1)
10 September 2014
Ledøje-Smørum Fodbold (4)	0–1	Fremad Amager (3)
Hvidovre IF (3)	1–2 (a.e.t.)	FC Roskilde (2)
16 September 2014
Marstal/Rise (4)	0–3	Jammerbugt FC (3)
23 September 2014
B73 Slagelse (7)	0–1	B 1908 (3)
Brabrand IF (3)	1–2	AC Horsens (2)
FC Lejre (5)	0–6	BK Søllerød-Vedbæk (3)
FC Svendborg (3)	1–0 (a.e.t.)	Kjellerup IF (3)
FC Sønderborg (4)	0–7	Silkeborg IF (1)
Gilleleje FK (8)	1–5	Hellerup IK (3)
Greve Fodbold (4)	2–1	Nykøbing FC (3)
Herlev IF (3)	0–2	B.93 (3)
Kolding Boldklub (3)	1–7	Randers FC (1)
Lindholm IF (4)	0–1	Esbjerg fB (1)
OKS Odense (6)	1–2	IK Skovbakken (3)
Boldklubben Rødovre (5)	2–1	Avedøre (3)
AGF Aarhus (2)	2–1 (a.e.t.)	Hobro IK (1)
24 September 2014
Aarhus Fremad (4)	2–1	FC Fredericia (2)
Esbjerg IF 92 (5)	0–3	SønderjyskE (1)
IF Lyseng (4)	1–2	Odder IGF (3)
Kalundborg GB (4)	0–10	Lyngby Boldklub (2)
Næsby BK (3)	0–3	HB Køge (2)
Varde IF (3)	3–2	Ringkøbing IF (3)
Brønshøj BK (2)	1–0	Odense BK (1)
SC Egedal (4)	1–1 (a.e.t.) (4–3 p)	FC Nordsjælland (1)
Tårnby Boldklub (4)	1–3	AB (2)
30 September 2014
BK Marienlyst (3)	1–2	Skive IK (2)
Vejgaard B (5)	1–2	Vejle Boldklub (2)

== Third round ==
32 teams were drawn into this round. Matches were played on 28 and 29 October 2014.

Team 1	Score	Team 2
28 October 2014
Jammerbugt FC (3)	0–2	Brønshøj BK (2)
BK Søllerød-Vedbæk (3)	0–3	Skive IK (2)
FC Midtjylland (1)	5–1	Aarhus Fremad (4)
Boldklubben Rødovre (5)	0–4	Silkeborg IF (1)
AGF Aarhus (2)	1–1 (a.e.t.) (4–5 p)	SønderjyskE (1)
29 October 2014
FC Svendborg (3)	2–3	Vestsjælland (1)
Greve Fodbold (4)	1–0	B.93 (3)
IK Skovbakken (3)	4–2	B 1908 (3)
AC Horsens (2)	0–7	Esbjerg fB (1)
Hellerup IK (3)	1–5	Odder IGF (3)
HB Køge (2)	2–1	AB (2)
Lyngby Boldklub (2)	0–2	Randers FC (1)
SC Egedal (4)	2–3	Varde IF (3)
Fremad Amager (3)	1–3	Brøndby IF (1)
30 October 2014
Vejle Boldklub (2)	0–1 (a.e.t.)	AaB (1)
FC Roskilde (2)	2–3	FC København (1)

== Fourth round ==
16 teams were drawn into this round. Matches were played on 16, 19, 26 and 29 November, 1, 3 and 4 December 2014.

16 November 2014	HB Køge (2)	0–3	Vestsjælland (1)	Herfølge
15:00			Christensen 6'; Bozga 29'; Nymann 81'	Stadium: SEAS-NVE Park; Referee: Peter Kjærsgaard-Andersen

19 November 2014	Odder (3)	2–4	AaB (1)	Aalborg
16:15	Johansen 1'; Rocatis 21'		Augustinussen 5'; Helenius 12'; Dalsgaard 53'; Jacobsen 74'	Stadium: Nordjyske Arena; Referee: Jens Maae

26 November 2014	Randers FC (1)	1–0 (a.e.t.)	Silkeborg (1)	Randers
18:00	Lundberg 110'			Stadium: AutoC Park Randers; Referee: Jakob Kehlet

29 November 2014	Brønshøj (2)	1–0	Skive (2)	Brønshøj
13:00	Granskov 65'			Stadium: Tingbjerg Idrætspark; Referee: Jesper Nielsen

1 December 2014	Varde (3)	0–3	SønderjyskE (1)	Haderslev
19:00			Pourié 11' (pen.); Marxen 34'; Golubović 81'	Stadium: Sydbank Park; Referee: Jens Maae

3 December 2014	Skovbakken (3)	1–2 (a.e.t.)	Brøndby (1)	Brøndby
18:00	Brodersen 62'		Nørgaard 11'; Phiri 98'	Stadium: Brøndby Stadion; Referee: Anders Poulsen

4 December 2014	Greve (4)	0–3	Copenhagen (1)	Greve Strand
18:00			Toutouh 45'; Delaney 67'; Felfel 90'	Stadium: Greve Stadion; Referee: Lars Christoffersen

4 December 2014	Esbjerg (1)	3–0	FC Midtjylland (1)	Esbjerg
20:30	Ankersen 14' (pen.); Sparv 35' (o.g.); Vestergaard 75'			Stadium: Blue Water Arena; Referee: Dennis Mogensen

== Quarter-finals ==
4 March 2015	SønderjyskE (1)	4–2 (a.e.t.)	Brøndby (1)	Haderslev
18:00	Pourié 3', 109'; Songani 65'; Absalonsen 107'		Elmander 24'; Pukki 33'	Stadium: Sydbank Park; Referee: Mads-Kristoffer Kristoffersen

4 March 2015	Brønshøj (2)	1–2	Vestsjælland (1)	Brønshøj
19:00	Akpoveta 28'		Vellios 9'; Dal Hende 13'	Stadium: Tingbjerg Idrætspark; Referee: Michael Johansen

5 March 2015	Copenhagen (1)	0–0 (a.e.t.) (5–4 p)	Randers FC (1)	Copenhagen
18:00				Stadium: Parken; Referee: Anders Poulsen

5 March 2015	Esbjerg FB (1)	4–2	AaB (1)	Esbjerg
20:30	Lyng 51'; Mensah 67', 72'; Rise 88'		Helenius 37'; Enevoldsen 41'	Stadium: Blue Water Arena; Referee: Jakob Kehlet

== Semi-finals ==
The sixth round, the semi-finals, are played as a two-legged tie. The legs were played on 15, 16, 29 and 30 April 2015.

15 April 2015	Vestsjælland (1)	2–0	SønderjyskE (1)	Slagelse
18:00	Jónsson 70'; Vellios 85'			Stadium: Harboe Arena; Referee: Anders Poulsen

29 April 2015	SønderjyskE (1)	1–0 (1–2 agg.)	Vestsjælland (1)	Haderslev
18:00	Absalonsen 5'			Stadium: Sydbank Park; Referee: Jakob Kehlet

16 April 2015	Copenhagen (1)	1–1	Esbjerg (1)	Copenhagen
18:15	Toutouh 11'		van Buren 68'	Stadium: Telia Parken; Referee: Jens Maae

30 April 2015	Esbjerg (1)	0–1 (1–2 agg.)	Copenhagen (1)	Esbjerg
19:30			Augustinsson 79'	Stadium: Blue Water Arena; Referee: Kenn Hansen

== Final ==
14 May 2015
16:00

FC Vestsjælland	2–3 (a.e.t.)	FC Copenhagen
Vellios 31'; D. Sørensen 88'		Nilsson 46'; Sigurðarson 54'; Olsen 102'

Parken, Copenhagen
Attendance: 24,095
Referee: Dennis Mogensen
