= 2009–10 in Danish football =

Football in Denmark
- Season: 2009–10

The 2009-10 season is the 120th season of competitive football in Denmark.

== Domestic competitions ==
Competition	Details	Winner	Match Report
Danish Superliga	2009-10	F.C. Copenhagen	
Danish Cup	2009-10	FC Nordsjælland	Report
Danish 1st Division	2009-10	AC Horsens	
Danish 2nd Division East	2009-10	Brønshøj BK	
Danish 2nd Division West	2009-10	FC Hjørring	

== National team ==
=== Players ===
==== 2010 World Cup squad ====
On May 10, a preliminary 30-man squad was named for the 2010 FIFA World Cup. The squad was cut down to 23 players on May 28.

No.	Pos.	Player	Date of birth (age)	Caps	Goals	Club
	GK	Jesper Christiansen	April 24, 1978 (age 48)	11	0	(Danish Football Association) Copenhagen
	GK	Stephan Andersen	November 26, 1981 (age 44)	7	0	(Danish Football Association) Brøndby
	GK	Thomas Sørensen	June 12, 1976 (age 50)	89	0	(The Football Association) Stoke City
	DF	Daniel Agger	December 12, 1984 (age 41)	35	3	(The Football Association) Liverpool
	DF	Lars Jacobsen	September 20, 1979 (age 47)	34	0	(The Football Association) Blackburn Rovers
	DF	Patrick Mtiliga	January 28, 1981 (age 45)	4	0	(Royal Spanish Football Federation) Málaga
	DF	Per Krøldrup	July 31, 1979 (age 47)	31	0	(Italian Football Federation) Fiorentina
	DF	Simon Kjær	March 26, 1989 (age 37)	11	0	(Italian Football Federation) Palermo
	DF	Simon Poulsen	October 7, 1984 (age 42)	8	0	(Royal Dutch Football Association) AZ
	DF	William Kvist	February 24, 1985 (age 41)	14	0	(Danish Football Association) Copenhagen
	MF	Christian Eriksen	February 14, 1992 (age 34)	5	0	(Royal Dutch Football Association) Ajax
	MF	Christian Poulsen	February 28, 1980 (age 46)	77	6	(Italian Football Federation) Juventus
	MF	Daniel Jensen	June 25, 1979 (age 47)	50	3	(German Football Association) Werder Bremen
	MF	Jakob Poulsen	July 7, 1983 (age 43)	15	1	(Danish Football Association) AGF
	MF	Mikkel Beckmann	October 24, 1983 (age 43)	6	0	(Danish Football Association) Randers
	MF	Thomas Enevoldsen	July 27, 1987 (age 39)	7	1	(Royal Dutch Football Association) Groningen
	MF	Thomas Kahlenberg	March 20, 1983 (age 43)	34	3	(German Football Association) VfL Wolfsburg
	FW	Dennis Rommedahl	July 22, 1978 (age 48)	99	17	(Royal Dutch Football Association) Ajax
	FW	Jesper Grønkjær	August 12, 1977 (age 49)	80	5	(Danish Football Association) Copenhagen
	FW	Jon Dahl Tomasson	August 29, 1976 (age 50)	112	52	(Royal Dutch Football Association) Feyenoord
	FW	Martin Jørgensen	October 6, 1975 (age 51)	99	12	(Danish Football Association) AGF
	FW	Nicklas Bendtner	January 16, 1988 (age 38)	35	12	(The Football Association) Arsenal
	FW	Søren Larsen	September 6, 1981 (age 45)	20	11	(German Football Association) MSV Duisburg

|}

No.	Pos.	Player	Date of birth (age)	Caps	Goals	Club
	GK	Kim Christensen (cut)	July 16, 1979 (age 47)	1	0	(Swedish Football Association) IFK Göteborg
	DF	Anders Møller Christensen (stand-by)	26 July 1977 (aged 32)	6	0	(Danish Football Association) OB
	DF	Leon Jessen (stand-by)	11 June 1986 (aged 24)	2	0	(Danish Football Association) FC Midtjylland
	MF	Mikkel Thygesen (stand-by)	22 October 1984 (aged 25)	3	0	(Danish Football Association) FC Midtjylland
	MF	Michael Silberbauer (cut)	July 7, 1981 (age 45)	14	1	(Royal Dutch Football Association) Utrecht
	FW	Michael Krohn-Dehli (cut)	June 6, 1983 (age 43)	5	0	(Danish Football Association) Brøndby
	FW	Morten Rasmussen (stand-by)	31 January 1985 (aged 25)	3	0	(Scottish Football Association) Celtic

==== Other call-ups ====
In addition to the above, the following players have appeared for Denmark during the 2009-10 season:

No.	Pos.	Player	Date of birth (age)	Caps	Goals	Club
	DF	Michael Jakobsen	January 2, 1986	5	0	(Danish Football Association) AaB
	DF	Kris Stadsgaard	August 1, 1985	1	0	(Norwegian Football Federation) Rosenborg BK
	DF	Michael Lumb	January 9, 1988	2	0	(Russian Football Union) Zenit Saint Petersburg
	MF	Lasse Schøne	May 27, 1986	1	1	(Royal Dutch Football Association) NEC Nijmegen
	MF	Hjalte Bo Nørregaard	April 8, 1981	4	0	(Danish Football Association) F.C. Copenhagen
	MF	Søren Rieks	April 7, 1987	3	1	(Danish Football Association) Esbjerg
	MF	Johan Absalonsen	September 16, 1985	2	1	(Danish Football Association) OB
	MF	Peter Nymann	August 22, 1982	1	0	(Danish Football Association) Esbjerg
	FW	Martin Bernburg	December 26, 1985	4	1	(Danish Football Association) Brøndby IF
	FW	Rajko Lekic	July 3, 1981	1	0	(Danish Football Association) Silkeborg IF
	FW	Jesper Bech	May 25, 1982	2	0	(Danish Football Association) Esbjerg fB

==== Goal scorers ====
Player	Goals
Nicklas Bendtner	3
Søren Rieks	1
Jakob Poulsen	1
Johan Absalonsen	1
Martin Bernburg	1
Lasse Schøne	1

=== Record ===
Competition	GP	W	D	L	GF	GA
2010 FIFA World Cup qualification	4	1	2	1	3	3
International Friendly	5	2	1	2	7	5
Total	9	3	3	3	10	8

=== Schedule ===
12 August 2009 International Friendly	Denmark	1 – 2	Chile	Brøndby, Denmark
20:15 UTC+2	Schøne 62'	(Report)	Paredes 60'; Alexis 68'	Stadium: Brøndby Stadium

5 September 2009 2010 FIFA World Cup qualification	Denmark	1 – 1	Portugal	Copenhagen, Denmark
20:00 UTC+2	Bendtner 42'	(Report)	Liédson 86'	Stadium: Parken Stadium; Attendance: 48,010; Referee: Massimo Busacca (Switzerland)

9 September 2009 2010 FIFA World Cup qualification	Albania	1 – 1	Denmark	Tirana, Albania
20:30 UTC+2	Bogdani 50'	(Report)	Bendtner 40'	Stadium: Qemal Stafa Stadium; Attendance: 4,500; Referee: Cüneyt Çakır (Turkey)

10 October 2009 2010 FIFA World Cup qualification	Denmark	1 – 0	Sweden	Copenhagen, Denmark
20:00 UTC+1	Poulsen 78'	(Report)		Stadium: Parken Stadium; Attendance: 38,000; Referee: Manuel Mejuto González (Spain)

14 October 2009 2010 FIFA World Cup qualification	Denmark	0 – 1	Hungary	Copenhagen, Denmark
20:45 UTC+1		(Report)	Buzsáky 35'	Stadium: Parken Stadium; Attendance: 36,956; Referee: Florian Meyer (Germany)

14 November 2009 International Friendly	Denmark	0 – 0	South Korea	Esbjerg, Denmark
20:00 UTC+1		(Report)		Stadium: Blue Water Arena; Attendance: 15,460; Referee: Martin Hansson (Sweden)

18 November 2009 International Friendly	Denmark	3 – 1	United States	Aarhus, Denmark
20:30 UTC+1	Absalonsen 48'; Rieks 52'; Bernberg 54'	(Report)	Cunningham 26'	Stadium: NRGi Arena; Attendance: 15,172; Referee: Craig Thomson (Scotland)

3 March 2010 International Friendly	Austria	2 – 1	Denmark	Vienna, Austria
20:30 UTC+1	Schiemer 12'; Wallner 37'	(Report)	Bendtner 17'	Stadium: Ernst-Happel-Stadion; Attendance: 13,500; Referee: Pavel Kralovec (Czech Republic)

27 May 2010 International Friendly	Denmark	2 – 0	Senegal	Aalborg, Denmark
18:00 UTC+1	C. Poulsen 27'; Enevoldsen 90'			Stadium: Aalborg Stadion; Attendance: 14,112

1 June 2010 International Friendly	Australia	1 – 0	Denmark	Johannesburg, South Africa
	Kennedy 71'			Stadium: Ruimsig Stadium

5 June 2010 International Friendly	South Africa	1 – 0	Denmark	Atteridgeville, South Africa
14:15 UTC+2	Mphela 75'			Stadium: Atteridgeville Super Stadium; Attendance: 25,000

14 June 2010 2010 FIFA World Cup	Netherlands	2 – 0	Denmark	Johannesburg, South Africa
13:30 UTC+2	Agger 46' (o.g.); Kuyt 85'			Stadium: Soccer City; Attendance: 83,465; Referee: Stéphane Lannoy (France)

19 June 2010 2010 FIFA World Cup	Cameroon	1 – 2	Denmark	Pretoria, South Africa
20:30 UTC+2	Eto'o 10'	Report	Bendtner 33'; Rommedahl 61'	Stadium: Loftus Versfeld Stadium; Attendance: 38,074; Referee: Jorge Larrionda (Uruguay)

24 June 2010 2010 FIFA World Cup	Denmark	1 – 3	Japan	Rustenburg, South Africa
20:30 UTC+2	Tomasson 81'	(FIFA Report)	Honda 17'; Endō 30'; Okazaki 87'	Stadium: Royal Bafokeng Stadium; Attendance: 27,967; Referee: Jerome Damon (South Africa)

|}

== League XI national team ==
On December 1, 2009, a 20-man squad Denmark League XI national football team was named to play a number of unofficial national team games at the 2010 King's Cup. Before the tournament, several players had pull out. Goalkeeper Stephan Andersen due to injury, Jesper Grønkjær and William Kvist due to F.C. Copenhagen's advancement in the UEFA Europa League, and Michael Lumb due to his transfer move to a foreign club.

The number of caps and goals reflect performances during the 2010 King's Cup.

=== Players ===
No.	Pos.	Player	Date of birth (age)	Caps	Goals	Club
1	GK	Steffen Rasmussen	September 30, 1982	1	0	(Danish Football Association) AGF (Replacement)
16	GK	Kim Christensen	July 16, 1979	2	0	(Swedish Football Association) IFK Göteborg
5	DF	Anders Møller Christensen	July 26, 1977	2	0	(Danish Football Association) OB
6	DF	Michael Jakobsen	January 2, 1986	3	0	(Danish Football Association) AaB
7	DF	Leon Jessen	June 11, 1986	2	0	(Danish Football Association) FC Midtjylland
9	DF	Jim Larsen	November 6, 1985	3	1	(Danish Football Association) Silkeborg IF
15	DF	Kris Stadsgaard	August 1, 1985	2	0	(Norwegian Football Federation) Rosenborg BK
11	MF	Peter Nymann	August 22, 1982	2	0	(Danish Football Association) Esbjerg
12	MF	Jakob Poulsen	July 7, 1983	3	1	(Danish Football Association) AGF
14	MF	Søren Rieks	April 7, 1987	3	2	(Danish Football Association) Esbjerg
17	MF	Johnny Thomsen	February 26, 1982	2	0	(Danish Football Association) SønderjyskE (Replacement)
18	MF	Mikkel Thygesen	October 22, 1984	3	1	(Danish Football Association) FC Midtjylland
19	MF	Rasmus Würtz	September 18, 1983	3	0	(Danish Football Association) AaB (Replacement)
20	MF	Martin Ørnskov	October 10, 1985	3	0	(Danish Football Association) Silkeborg IF
2	FW	Johan Absalonsen	September 16, 1985	2	1	(Danish Football Association) OB
3	FW	Jesper Bech	May 25, 1982	3	1	(Danish Football Association) Silkeborg IF
4	FW	Martin Bernburg	December 26, 1985	3	1	(Danish Football Association) Brøndby IF
8	FW	Michael Krohn-Dehli	June 6, 1983	3	0	(Danish Football Association) Brøndby
10	FW	Rajko Lekic	July 3, 1981	3	2	(Danish Football Association) Silkeborg IF (Replacement)
13	FW	Morten Rasmussen	January 31, 1985	2	1	(Danish Football Association) Brøndby IF

=== Schedule ===
17 January 2010 2010 King's Cup	Denmark	3 – 1	Poland	Nakhon Ratchasima, Thailand
16:00 UTC+7	Rieks 22'; Rasmussen 48'; Bech 60'	Report	Peszko 26'	Stadium: 5th December Stadium

20 January 2010 2010 King's Cup	Singapore	1 – 5	Denmark	Nakhon Ratchasima, Thailand
16:00 UTC+7	Nawaz 84'	Report	Larsen 8'; Poulsen 19' (pen.); Lekic 35'; Thygesen 48'; Rieks 80'	Stadium: 5th December Stadium

23 January 2010 2010 King's Cup	Thailand	0 – 3	Denmark	Nakhon Ratchasima, Thailand
18:45 UTC+7		Report	Lekic 19'; Absalonsen 37'; Bernburg 86'	Stadium: 5th December Stadium; Attendance: 20,000; Referee: Odan Charles Mbaga (Tanzania)
