= Denmark League XI =

Unofficial Danish football team

- Nickname: Ligalandsholdet (lit. "The league's national team")
- Association: Danish Football Association (Dansk Boldspil-Union)

First international
- (Denmark) League XI 3 - 1 FC Luzern (Switzerland) (Maspalomas, Spain; 1 February 1983); Against another national team United Arab Emirates 3 - 1 League XI (Denmark) (Dubai, United Arab Emirates; 24 February 1984)

Biggest win
- United Arab Emirates 0 - 5 League XI (Denmark) (Dubai, United Arab Emirates; 9 February 1990)

Biggest defeat
- El Salvador 3 - 0 League XI (Denmark) (San Salvador, El Salvador; 3 February 1984) (Denmark) League XI 0 - 3 Soviet Union (Calcutta, India; 3 February 1987)

The Denmark League XI is an unofficial national football team run by the Danish Football Association.

The team generally consists of Danish players playing in the Danish Superliga or other leagues if their clubs agree to release them. It is only assembled in the start of the year, during the winter break in the Superliga.

The matches of the League XI have generally not been recognised as official matches by the Danish FA, although FIFA recognised matches until 2007.

== History ==
A Danish Football Combination played the Scottish League XI in 1955. Since 1983, the team has been assembled every year except 2005 (because of an early World Cup qualification match) and 2011 (where no suitable trip could be arranged) in January or February.

The League XI national team has played 84 matches throughout its existence, of which 51 were played in 1983-1999 and 33 in 2000-2018. No additional matches were played in 2019-2022.

== Players ==
The purpose of the league XI is to give the head coach an opportunity to evaluate the level of the best players of the Superliga, and to introduce new players into the atmosphere of the national team.

== Friendlies ==
17 January 2010 2010 King's Cup	Denmark League XI	3–1	Poland	Thailand
16:00 UTC+7	Rieks 22'; Rasmussen 48'; Bech 60'	Report	Peszko 26'	Stadium: 80th Birthday Anniversary Stadium, Nakhon Ratchasima

20 January 2010 2010 King's Cup	Singapore	1–5	Denmark League XI	Thailand
16:00 UTC+7	Fazrul 84'	Report	Larsen 8'; Poulsen 19' (pen.); Lekic 35'; Thygesen 48'; Rieks 80'	Stadium: 80th Birthday Anniversary Stadium, Nakhon Ratchasima

23 January 2010 2010 King's Cup	Thailand	0–3	Denmark League XI	Thailand
18:45 UTC+7		Report	Lekic 19'; Absalonsen 37'; Bernburg 86'	Stadium: 80th Birthday Anniversary Stadium, Nakhon Ratchasima; Attendance: 20,000; Referee: Mongkolchai Pechsri (Thailand)

15 January 2012 2012 King's Cup	Denmark League XI	1–1	Norway	Thailand
16:10	Makienok 70'	Report	Elyounoussi 79'	Stadium: Rajamangala Stadium, Bangkok; Attendance: 3,240; Referee: Mongkolchai Pechsri (Thailand)

18 January 2012 2012 King's Cup	Denmark League XI	0–0	South Korea U-23	Thailand
16:10		Report		Stadium: Rajamangala Stadium, Bangkok; Referee: Prathan Nasawang (Thailand)

21 January 2012 2012 King's Cup	Thailand	1–3	Denmark League XI	Thailand
19:00	Sumanya Purisai 52'	Report	Makienok 10'; Spelmann 43'; Nielsen 92'	Stadium: Rajamangala Stadium, Bangkok; Attendance: 3,000; Referee: Yudai Yamamoto (Japan)

26 January 2013	Canada	0–4	Denmark League XI	United States
		Report	Andreas Cornelius 8', 35', 63'; Kasper Lorentzen 11'	Stadium: Veterans Kino Sports Complex; Attendance: 3,082; Referee: Juan Guzman

30 January 2013	Mexico	1–1	Denmark League XI	United States
	Marco Fabián 66' (pen.)	Report	Andreas Cornelius 83' (pen.)	Stadium: University of Phoenix Stadium; Attendance: 43,345; Referee: Chris Penso

11 January 2018 Friendly	Sweden	1–0	Denmark League XI	Abu Dhabi, United Arab Emirates
20:45 UTC+4	G. Nilsson 90+3'	Report		Stadium: Zayed Sports City Stadium; Referee: Antti Munukka (Finland)

15 January 2018 Friendly	Jordan	3–2	Denmark League XI	Abu Dhabi, United Arab Emirates
17:00 UTC+4	Chanti 25'; Al-Dardour 57'; Al-Mardi 83'	Report	Gammelby 48'; Duelund 85'	Stadium: Zayed Sports City Stadium; Attendance: 272; Referee: Adel Al Naqbi (United Arab Emirates)

Since January 1983, the League XI national team has played 84 matches throughout its existence, of which 51 were played in 1983-1999 and 33 in 2000-2018. No additional matches were played in 2019-2022.
