= 2025 Assens municipal election =

Municipal election in Denmark

← 2021	18 November 2025	2029 →

All 29 seats to the Assens municipal council 15 seats needed for a majority
- Turnout: 23,537 (72.4%) ▲2.3%
	First party	Second party	Third party
	V	A	F
Party	Venstre	Social Democrats	Green Left
Last election	13 seats, 41.7%	8 seats, 27.3%	2 seats, 6.5%
Seats won	12	5	3
Seat change	▼1	▼3	▲1
Popular vote	9,173	4,372	2,335
Percentage	39.8%	19.0%	10.1%
Swing	▼1.9%	▼8.4%	▲3.6%
	Fourth party	Fifth party	Sixth party
	I	O	Æ
Party	Liberal Alliance	Danish People's Party	Denmark Democrats
Last election	Did not stand	1 seat, 5.2%	Did not stand
Seats won	2	2	2
Seat change	▲2	▲1	▲2
Popular vote	1,402	1,293	1,270
Percentage	6.1%	5.6%	5.5%
Swing	New	▲0.4%	New
	Seventh party	Eighth party	Ninth party
	C	Ø	B
Party	Conservatives	Red-Green Alliance	Social Liberals
Last election	3 seats, 7.9%	1 seat, 3.4%	0 seats, 2.5%
Seats won	1	1	1
Seat change	▼2	0	▲1
Popular vote	1,263	942	709
Percentage	5.5%	4.1%	3.1%
Swing	▼2.5%	▲0.7%	▲0.6%
Mayor before election
Søren Steen Andersen
Venstre
Mayor after election
Søren Steen Andersen
Venstre

The 2025 Assens Municipal election was held on November 18, 2025, to elect the 29 members to sit in the regional council for the Assens Municipal council, in the period of 2026 to 2029. Anstina Krogh from the Social Democrats, would win the mayoral position.

== Background ==
Following the 2021 election, Søren Steen Andersen from Venstre became mayor for his third term. He would run a fourth term.

== Electoral system ==
For elections to Danish municipalities, a number varying from 9 to 31 are chosen to be elected to the municipal council. The seats are then allocated using the D'Hondt method and a closed list proportional representation. Assens Municipality had 29 seats in 2025.

== Electoral alliances ==
=== Electoral Alliance 1 ===
Party		Political alignment
B	Social Liberals	Centre to Centre-left
F	Green Left	Centre-left to Left-wing
Ø	Red-Green Alliance	Left-wing to Far-Left
Å	The Alternative	Centre-left to Left-wing

=== Electoral Alliance 2 ===
Party		Political alignment
C	Conservatives	Centre-right
I	Liberal Alliance	Centre-right to Right-wing
O	Danish People's Party	Right-wing to Far-right
Æ	Denmark Democrats	Right-wing to Far-right

=== Electoral Alliance 3 ===
Party		Political alignment
L	Vi Lokale Demokrater	Local politics
V	Venstre	Centre-right

== Results by polling station ==
Division	A	B	C	D	F	I	L	O	V	Æ	Ø	Å
Division	%	%	%	%	%	%	%	%	%	%	%	%
ARENA ASSENS	22.4	2.5	7.5	0.5	9.0	4.8	0.1	5.3	38.2	5.1	4.2	0.4
Ebberup/Helnæs	18.2	1.3	4.5	0.3	9.1	8.1	0.3	5.3	44.1	5.3	3.2	0.5
Turup	15.8	4.0	4.2	0.2	7.1	7.6	0.2	5.6	39.6	10.0	4.0	1.6
Salbrovad	10.4	2.3	22.4	1.1	6.3	10.7	0.0	4.8	29.7	8.2	3.9	0.2
Aarup/Kerte	17.8	6.1	4.2	0.5	9.9	5.8	0.1	4.8	40.0	6.5	3.8	0.4
Rørup	9.4	23.4	3.6	1.3	4.6	4.6	0.3	10.2	29.2	10.9	2.5	0.3
Orte/Ørsted	14.0	3.4	5.9	1.1	13.6	6.8	0.0	4.4	38.9	6.1	5.0	0.8
Glamsbjerg/Søllested	27.4	2.1	3.5	0.4	9.5	7.7	0.0	10.3	28.0	5.3	4.0	1.7
Flemløse	17.9	0.8	6.3	1.9	8.2	11.8	0.2	8.0	32.7	7.8	3.2	1.3
Køng	19.7	3.6	4.7	0.5	9.9	11.1	0.0	6.8	33.9	5.4	3.8	0.5
Vissenbjerg	17.7	3.1	3.7	0.6	7.6	5.7	0.6	4.7	43.6	5.8	6.3	0.6
Dreslette	21.8	1.6	6.4	0.6	10.0	6.2	0.2	6.8	35.1	6.0	4.6	0.6
Haarby	20.2	1.2	7.4	0.2	7.3	7.5	0.1	6.0	42.3	5.2	2.3	0.4
Jordløse	19.9	4.4	6.2	1.8	7.8	7.5	0.0	7.8	29.7	6.7	7.0	1.3
Brylle	19.0	0.7	6.2	0.2	7.5	3.1	0.2	3.7	54.2	2.4	2.5	0.3
Tommerup	11.3	2.5	4.6	0.6	15.6	4.0	0.1	4.1	48.3	4.6	3.6	0.7
Tommerup St	18.4	2.5	3.0	0.4	24.5	3.4	0.0	4.3	35.5	3.0	4.5	0.5
Verninge/Nårup	15.5	2.2	4.4	1.0	10.1	5.8	0.0	4.6	48.7	5.2	2.4	0.2

== Results ==
Party		Votes	%	+/-	Seats	+/-
Assens Municipality
V	Venstre	9,173	39.76	-1.90	12	-1
A	Social Democrats	4,372	18.95	-8.38	5	-3
F	Green Left	2,335	10.12	+3.64	3	+1
I	Liberal Alliance	1,402	6.08	New	2	New
O	Danish People's Party	1,293	5.60	+0.44	2	+1
Æ	Denmark Democrats	1,270	5.50	New	2	New
C	Conservatives	1,263	5.47	-2.47	1	-2
Ø	Red-Green Alliance	942	4.08	+0.69	1	0
B	Social Liberals	709	3.07	+0.62	1	+1
Å	The Alternative	141	0.61	-0.09	0	0
D	New Right	135	0.59	-3.36	0	-1
L	Vi Lokale Demokrater	36	0.16	-0.10	0	0
Total		23,071	100	N/A	29	N/A
Invalid votes		84	0.26	-0.04		
Blank votes		382	1.18	+0.07		
Turnout		23,537	72.41	+2.29		
Source: valg.dk

== Opinion polls ==
Polling firm	Fieldwork date	Sample size	V	A	C	F	O	D	Ø	B	Å	I	L	Æ	Others	Lead
Epinion	4 Sep - 13 Oct 2025	546	36.4	22.9	5.0	10.2	4.1	–	2.9	2.9	1.6	6.1	–	7.5	0.4	13.5
2024 european parliament election	9 Jun 2024		17.5	20.8	7.6	14.2	7.9	–	3.7	4.8	1.8	5.7	–	10.4	–	3.3
2022 general election	1 Nov 2022		15.5	34.5	4.3	6.5	3.2	4.7	2.8	1.8	2.0	5.2	–	10.6	–	19.0
2021 regional election	16 Nov 2021		40.5	27.4	6.1	6.4	4.8	4.7	3.9	3.0	0.8	0.5	–	–	–	13.1
2021 municipal election	16 Nov 2021		41.7 (13)	27.3 (8)	7.9 (3)	6.5 (2)	5.2 (1)	3.9 (1)	3.4 (1)	2.5 (0)	0.7 (0)	–	–	–	–	14.4
