= 2021 Assens municipal election =

| ← 2017 | 16 November 2021 | 2025 → |

All 29 seats to the Assens Municipal Council 15 seats needed for a majority
- Turnout: 22,984 (70.1%) ▼6.0pp
| | First party | Second party | Third party |
|---|---|---|---|
| | V | A | C |
| Party | Venstre | Social Democrats | Conservatives |
| Last election | 13 seats, 42.0% | 8 seats, 25.5% | 1 seat, 4.2% |
| Seats won | 13 | 8 | 3 |
| Seat change | 0 | 0 | ▲2 |
| Popular vote | 9,386 | 6,157 | 1,789 |
| Percentage | 41.7% | 27.3% | 7.9% |
| Swing | ▼0.3% | ▲1.8% | ▲3.7% |
| | Fourth party | Fifth party | Sixth party |
| | F | O | D |
| Party | Green Left | Danish People's Party | The New Right |
| Last election | 2 seats, 6.0% | 3 seats, 12.3% | Did Not Stand |
| Seats won | 2 | 1 | 1 |
| Seat change | 0 | ▼2 | ▲1 |
| Popular vote | 1.459 | 1,163 | 889 |
| Percentage | 6.5% | 5.2% | 4.0% |
| Swing | ▲0.5% | ▼7.1% | New |
| | Seventh party | Eighth party |
| | Ø | B |
| Party | Red–Green Alliance | Social Liberals |
| Last election | 1 seat, 3.5% | 1 seat, 3.0% |
| Seats won | 1 | 0 |
| Seat change | 0 | ▼1 |
| Popular vote | 764 | 552 |
| Percentage | 3.4% | 2.4% |
| Swing | ▼0.1% | ▼0.6% |
Mayor before election
Søren Steen Andersen
Venstre
Mayor after election
Søren Steen Andersen
Venstre

Despite Venstre having failed to become the largest party in Assens Municipality for all Danish general elections since the 2007 municipal reform , they became the biggest party in both the 2013 Assens Municipal Election and the 2017 Assens Municipal Election.

Søren Steen Andersen from Venstre was seeking a third term for this election. This was announced in September 2020, when Venstre voted in favor of it.

In the election, Venstre would once again become the biggest party with 13 seats. The parties of the traditional blue bloc would win 18 of 29 seats. On December 1, 2021, it was announced that the Social Democrats, Conservatives and Venstre had made a new constitution, remarkbly without the Green Left, who left the constitution after one of their members left the party in protest. 4 days later, it was announced that the Social Democrats also had left the constitution negotiations. This meant that only Venstre and the Conservatives were back. However they had 16 seats and maintained a majority. Then on 8 December, 2021, it was confirmed that Søren Steen Andersen had secured a third term.

== Electoral system ==
For elections to Danish municipalities, a number varying from 9 to 31 are chosen to be elected to the municipal council. The seats are then allocated using the D'Hondt method and a closed list proportional representation. Assens Municipality had 29 seats in 2021

Unlike in Danish General Elections, in elections to municipal councils, electoral alliances are allowed.

== Electoral alliances ==
=== Electoral Alliance 1 ===
| Party | | Political alignment |
|---|---|---|
| B | Social Liberals | Centre to Centre-left |
| F | Green Left | Centre-left to Left-wing |
| Å | The Alternative | Centre-left to Left-wing |

=== Electoral Alliance 2 ===
| Party | | Political alignment |
|---|---|---|
| A | Social Democrats | Centre-left |
| Ø | Red–Green Alliance | Left-wing to Far-Left |

=== Electoral Alliance 3 ===
| Party | | Political alignment |
|---|---|---|
| C | Conservatives | Centre-right |
| O | Danish People's Party | Right-wing to Far-right |

=== Electoral Alliance 4 ===
| Party | | Political alignment |
|---|---|---|
| D | New Right | Right-wing to Far-right |
| V | Venstre | Centre-right |
| Z | De LokalNationale | Local politics |

== Results by polling station ==
H = SocialKonservative Assens
M = Vi Lokale Demokrater
Z = De LokalNationale

| Division | A | B | C | D | F | H | M | O | V | Z | Æ | Ø | Å |
| Division | % | % | % | % | % | % | % | % | % | % | % | % | % |
|---|---|---|---|---|---|---|---|---|---|---|---|---|---|
| Assens | 31.2 | 2.0 | 10.3 | 3.3 | 4.8 | 0.2 | 0.1 | 5.0 | 37.5 | 0.3 | 0.7 | 4.3 | 0.4 |
| Ebberup | 30.4 | 1.5 | 7.9 | 3.3 | 6.0 | 0.0 | 0.0 | 6.1 | 41.3 | 0.0 | 0.2 | 2.5 | 0.9 |
| Turup | 21.1 | 2.8 | 4.3 | 1.1 | 7.5 | 0.0 | 0.2 | 7.7 | 49.2 | 0.0 | 0.6 | 3.2 | 2.2 |
| Salbrovad | 19.1 | 2.2 | 12.4 | 4.7 | 5.3 | 0.0 | 0.2 | 6.3 | 44.2 | 0.2 | 0.6 | 3.3 | 1.4 |
| Glamsbjerg/Søllested | 30.6 | 2.4 | 6.3 | 3.6 | 8.6 | 0.1 | 0.2 | 7.8 | 34.3 | 0.2 | 0.3 | 3.7 | 2.0 |
| Orte/Ørsted | 22.1 | 2.8 | 8.1 | 4.3 | 10.1 | 0.1 | 0.4 | 5.4 | 41.1 | 0.0 | 0.3 | 4.7 | 0.7 |
| Rørup | 20.2 | 20.5 | 1.6 | 5.4 | 3.2 | 0.3 | 0.0 | 9.7 | 36.7 | 0.0 | 1.1 | 1.3 | 0.0 |
| Aarup/Kerte | 29.1 | 3.3 | 6.8 | 3.7 | 5.1 | 0.0 | 0.2 | 4.9 | 43.0 | 0.1 | 0.5 | 3.0 | 0.3 |
| Flemløse | 22.7 | 0.9 | 12.4 | 5.8 | 3.9 | 0.0 | 0.4 | 8.1 | 40.3 | 0.4 | 0.6 | 3.6 | 1.1 |
| Køng | 24.7 | 5.9 | 5.3 | 3.6 | 7.3 | 0.2 | 0.0 | 6.7 | 41.4 | 0.2 | 0.4 | 4.1 | 0.4 |
| Vissenbjerg | 24.4 | 1.6 | 4.8 | 5.1 | 6.5 | 0.1 | 1.1 | 4.7 | 46.7 | 0.2 | 0.2 | 4.2 | 0.6 |
| Dreslette/Helnæs | 23.3 | 1.3 | 10.3 | 2.2 | 5.9 | 0.0 | 0.0 | 4.5 | 47.4 | 0.2 | 0.5 | 3.6 | 0.8 |
| Tommerup | 21.5 | 2.0 | 5.0 | 5.1 | 10.4 | 0.1 | 0.1 | 2.7 | 49.9 | 0.5 | 0.5 | 1.8 | 0.5 |
| Brylle | 26.2 | 1.2 | 12.3 | 4.5 | 7.2 | 0.0 | 0.1 | 4.2 | 41.0 | 0.2 | 0.4 | 1.9 | 0.7 |
| Jordløse | 21.5 | 3.0 | 11.6 | 4.4 | 4.1 | 0.0 | 0.0 | 6.3 | 39.4 | 0.0 | 0.8 | 7.2 | 1.7 |
| Haarby | 27.9 | 1.0 | 11.3 | 3.4 | 3.7 | 0.2 | 0.1 | 4.3 | 46.0 | 0.2 | 0.2 | 1.6 | 0.1 |
| Tommerup St | 36.5 | 3.5 | 7.7 | 2.4 | 11.7 | 0.0 | 0.0 | 2.9 | 30.0 | 0.1 | 0.2 | 4.0 | 1.0 |
| Verninge/Nårup | 24.7 | 1.5 | 5.3 | 6.5 | 6.0 | 0.2 | 0.1 | 4.7 | 47.8 | 0.1 | 0.4 | 2.4 | 0.2 |

== Results ==
| Party | | Votes | % | +/- | Seats | +/- |
Assens Municipality
| V | Venstre | 9,386 | 41.66 | -0.36 | 13 | 0 |
| A | Social Democrats | 6,157 | 27.33 | +1.87 | 8 | 0 |
| C | Conservatives | 1,789 | 7.94 | +3.75 | 3 | +2 |
| F | Green Left | 1,459 | 6.48 | +0.52 | 2 | 0 |
| O | Danish People's Party | 1,163 | 5.16 | -7.17 | 1 | -2 |
| D | New Right | 889 | 3.95 | New | 1 | New |
| Ø | Red-Green Alliance | 764 | 3.39 | -0.13 | 1 | 0 |
| B | Social Liberals | 552 | 2.45 | -0.50 | 0 | -1 |
| Å | The Alternative | 158 | 0.70 | -0.93 | 0 | 0 |
| Æ | Freedom List | 95 | 0.42 | New | 0 | New |
| M | Vi Lokale Demokrater | 57 | 0.25 | New | 0 | New |
| Z | De LokalNationale | 42 | 0.19 | New | 0 | New |
| H | SocialKonservative Assens | 18 | 0.08 | New | 0 | New |
| Total | | 22,529 | 100 | N/A | 29 | N/A |
| Invalid votes | | 98 | 0.30 | +0.10 | | |
| Blank votes | | 357 | 1.09 | -0.14 | | |
| Turnout | | 22,984 | 70.12 | -6.02 | | |
Source: valg.dk
