= 2010 King's Cup =

Tournament details
- Host country: Thailand
- Dates: 17–23 January
- Teams: 4 (from 2 confederations)
- Venue: 1 (in 1 host city)

Final positions
- Champions: Denmark (3rd title)
- Runners-up: Poland
- Third place: Thailand
- Fourth place: Singapore

Tournament statistics
- Matches played: 6
- Goals scored: 25 (4.17 per match)
- Top scorer(s): (Denmark) Rajko Lekic (Poland) Robert Lewandowski (Poland) Patryk Małecki (Denmark) Søren Rieks (2 goals each)

The 40th King's Cup finals was held in Nakhon Ratchasima, Thailand from 17 January until 23 January. The King's Cup is an international football competition held in Thailand. This edition featured four teams and reverted to a round robin group stage.

Sweden was initially due to take part in the competition but later withdrew, thus being replaced by North Korea, who also later withdrew. They were replaced by Singapore. The tournament was moved to the North East of Thailand for the first time as the Thai Football Association continue to promote the game around the country.

Denmark and Poland, the other two invitees, were represented by the Danish League XI and Polish League XI select squads.

== Participating nations ==
- Denmark
- Poland
- Singapore
- Thailand

== Venue ==
Nakhon Ratchasima
80th Birthday Stadium
Capacity: 25,000
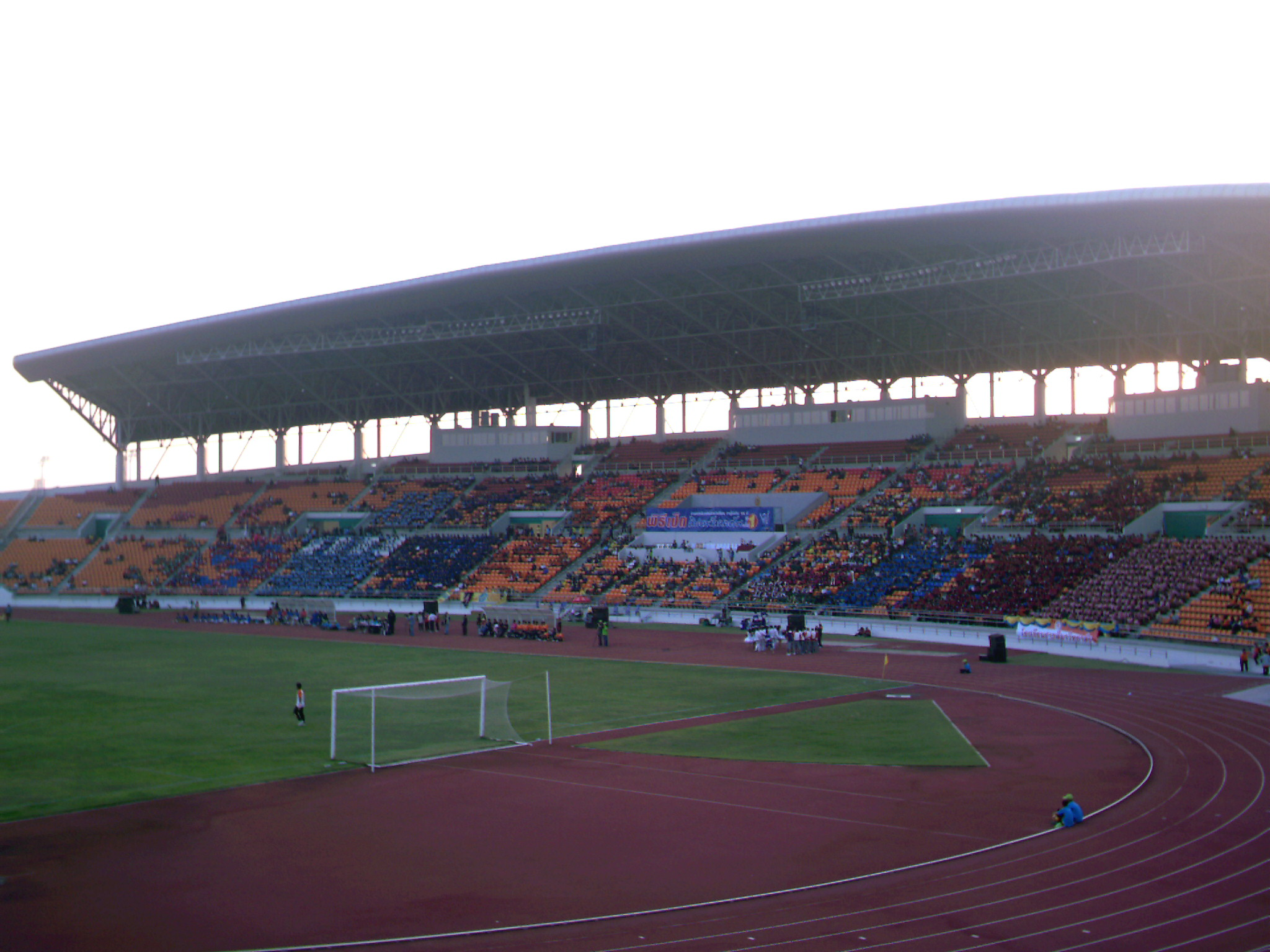

== Matches ==
Team	Pld	W	D	L	GF	GA	GD	Pts
Denmark	3	3	0	0	11	2	+9	9
Poland	3	2	0	1	10	5	+5	6
Thailand	3	1	0	2	2	6	−4	3
Singapore	3	0	0	3	2	12	−10	0

Source: RSSSF
17 January 2010
16:00 UTC+7

Denmark	3–1	Poland
Rieks 22'; Rasmussen 48'; Bech 60'		Peszko 26'

80th Birthday Stadium, Nakhon Ratchasima

17 January 2010
18:30 UTC+7

Thailand	1–0	Singapore
Sutee 59'

80th Birthday Stadium, Nakhon Ratchasima
Attendance: 20,000

20 January 2010
16:00 UTC+7

Singapore	1–5	Denmark
Nawaz 84'		Larsen 8'; Poulsen 19' (pen.); Lekic 35'; Thygesen 48'; Rieks 80'

80th Birthday Stadium, Nakhon Ratchasima

20 January 2010
18:30 UTC+7

Poland	3–1	Thailand
Glik 43'; Małecki 52'; Robak 87'		Therdsak 90' (pen.)

80th Birthday Stadium, Nakhon Ratchasima
Attendance: 20,000

23 January 2010
16:00 UTC+7

Poland	6–1	Singapore
Lewandowski 26' (pen.), 37'; Iwański 45' (pen.); Brożek 69'; Małecki 80'; Nowak 88' (pen.)		Shi Jiayi 39'

80th Birthday Stadium, Nakhon Ratchasima

23 January 2010
18:45 UTC+7

Thailand	0–3	Denmark
		Lekic 19'; Absalonsen 37'; Bernburg 86'

80th Birthday Stadium, Nakhon Ratchasima
Attendance: 20,000

== Winner ==
2010 King's Cup champion

Denmark
3rd title

== Scorers ==
2 goals

- (Denmark) Rajko Lekic
- (Denmark) Søren Rieks
- (Poland) Robert Lewandowski
- (Poland) Patryk Małecki

1 goal

- (Denmark) Johan Absalonsen
- (Denmark) Jesper Bech
- (Denmark) Martin Bernburg
- (Denmark) Jim Larsen
- (Denmark) Jakob Poulsen
- (Denmark) Morten Rasmussen
- (Denmark) Mikkel Thygesen
- (Poland) Kamil Glik
- (Poland) Maciej Iwański
- (Poland) Piotr Brożek
- (Poland) Tomasz Nowak
- (Poland) Sławomir Peszko
- (Poland) Marcin Robak
- (Singapore) Fazrul Nawaz
- (Singapore) Shi Jiayi
- (Thailand) Sutee Suksomkit
- (Thailand) Therdsak Chaiman
