= 2012 King's Cup =

Tournament details
- Host country: Thailand
- Dates: 15–21 January
- Teams: 4 (from 2 confederations)
- Venue(s): 1 (in 1 host city)

Final positions
- Champions: South Korea U-23 (1st title)
- Runners-up: Denmark League XI

Tournament statistics
- Matches played: 6
- Goals scored: 14 (2.33 per match)
- Top scorer(s): (South Korea) Kim Hyun-sung (Denmark) Simon Makienok (South Korea) Seo Jung-jin (2 goals each)

The 2012 King's Cup was the 41st edition of the tournament which was held in Bangkok, Thailand from 15 January until 21 January. The King's Cup is an international football competition held in Thailand. This edition featured four teams and reverted to a round robin group stage.

== Venue ==
Bangkok
Rajamangala Stadium
Capacity: 49,772
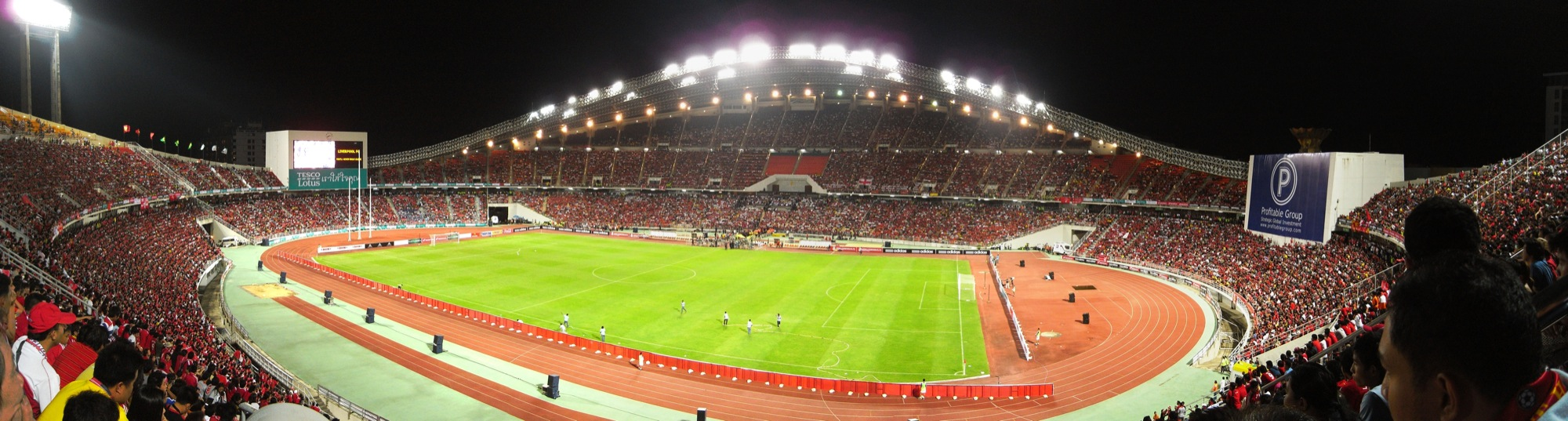

== Matches ==
All times were Indochina Time (ICT) – UTC+7.

Team	Pld	W	D	L	GF	GA	GD	Pts
South Korea U-23	3	2	1	0	6	1	+5	7
Denmark League XI	3	1	2	0	4	2	+2	5
Norway	3	1	1	1	2	4	−2	4
Thailand	3	0	0	3	2	7	−5	0

Source: RSSSF
15 January 2012
16:10

Denmark League XI	1–1	Norway
Makienok 70'	Report	Elyounoussi 79'

Rajamangala Stadium, Bangkok
Referee: Mongkolchai Pechsri (Thailand)

15 January 2012
19:00

Thailand	1–3	South Korea U-23
Teerathep 53'	Report	Kim Dong-sub 44'; Seo Jung-jin 69'; Kim Hyun-sung 80'

Rajamangala Stadium, Bangkok
Referee: Yudai Yamamoto (Japan)

18 January 2012
16:10

Denmark League XI	0–0	South Korea U-23
	Report

Rajamangala Stadium, Bangkok
Referee: Prathan Nasawang (Thailand)

18 January 2012
19:00

Thailand	0–1	Norway
	Report	Reginiussen 84'

Rajamangala Stadium, Bangkok
Referee: Yudai Yamamoto (Japan)

21 January 2012
16:10

South Korea U-23	3–0	Norway
Kim Bo-kyung 16' (pen.); Kim Hyun-sung 20'; Seo Jung-jin 59'	Report

Rajamangala Stadium, Bangkok
Referee: Chaiya Mahapab (Thailand)

21 January 2012
19:00

Thailand	1–3	Denmark League XI
Sumanya Purisai 52'	Report	Makienok 10'; Spelmann 43'; Nielsen 92'

Rajamangala Stadium, Bangkok
Referee: Yudai Yamamoto (Japan)

== Scorers ==
2 goals

- (Denmark) Simon Christoffersen
- (South Korea) Kim Hyun-sung
- (South Korea) Seo Jung-jin

1 goal

- (Norway) Tarik Elyounoussi
- (Norway) Tore Reginiussen
- (Denmark) Martin Spelmann
- (Denmark) Martin Ørnskov Nielsen
- (South Korea) Kim Dong-sub
- (South Korea) Kim Bo-kyung
- (Thailand) Sumanya Purisai
- (Thailand) Teeratep Winothai
