= Casper Radza =

Danish footballer (born 1994)

Personal information
- Date of birth: 26 February 1994 (age 32)
- Place of birth: Ebberup, Denmark
- Height: 1.84 m (6 ft 0 in)
- Position: Goalkeeper

Team information
- Current team: Middelfart
- Number: 1

Youth career
- Ebberup IF
- FC Assens
- 2009–2013: OB

Senior career*
Years	Team	Apps	(Gls)
2013–2016	OB	1	(0)
2016	Næsby		
2016	TB	11	(0)
2017–	Middelfart	276	(0)

International career
2009–2010	Denmark U16	3	(0)
2010	Denmark U17	1	(0)
2012	Denmark U18	2	(0)
2012–2013	Denmark U19	7	(0)
2013	Denmark U20	3	(0)
2015	Denmark U21	1	(0)
- * Club domestic league appearances and goals as of 2 June 2026

Casper Radza (born 26 February 1994) Danish professional footballer who plays as a goalkeeper for Danish 1st Division club Middelfart.

== Career ==
=== OB ===
Radza joined OB's academy in 2009 from cooperation club FC Assens, after having started playing football for hometown club Ebberup IF. In March 2012 Radza extended his contract with OB. The first year of the contract was a part-time contract because he was to complete his education, after which he joined as a full-time professional in the summer of 2013 as the third goalkeeper. In June 2014, he extended his contract by another two years, keeping him at OB until 2016.

On 7 August 2015, Radza made his professional debut in the Danish Superliga, replacing the injured Michael Falkesgaard in the 64th minute of a 2–2 home draw against AGF.

On 28 January 2016, OB announced that Radza's contract had been terminated by mutual consent, as he sought a club that could provide him with regular and dependable playing time on the first team.

=== Later career ===
Just three hours after Radza was released by OB, he joined the Danish 2nd Division club Næsby. Six months later, on 26 July 2016, he moved to Faroese club TB.

He remained at TB for five months before again returning to Denmark, signing a one-and-a-half-year contract with Danish 2nd Division club Middelfart in December 2016. He evolved into a starter for the team, and on 15 December 2017, he extended his contract with the club until December 2019. On 25 June 2019, he signed another contract extension, this time until December 2020. In July 2024, Radza signed a one-year contract extension with Middelfart, keeping him at the club until the end of the 2024–25 season. He was part of the squad that achieved promotion to the Danish 1st Division in the that same season, marking the club's first appearance in the second tier in 50 years.
