= Fazrul Nawaz =

Singaporean footballer

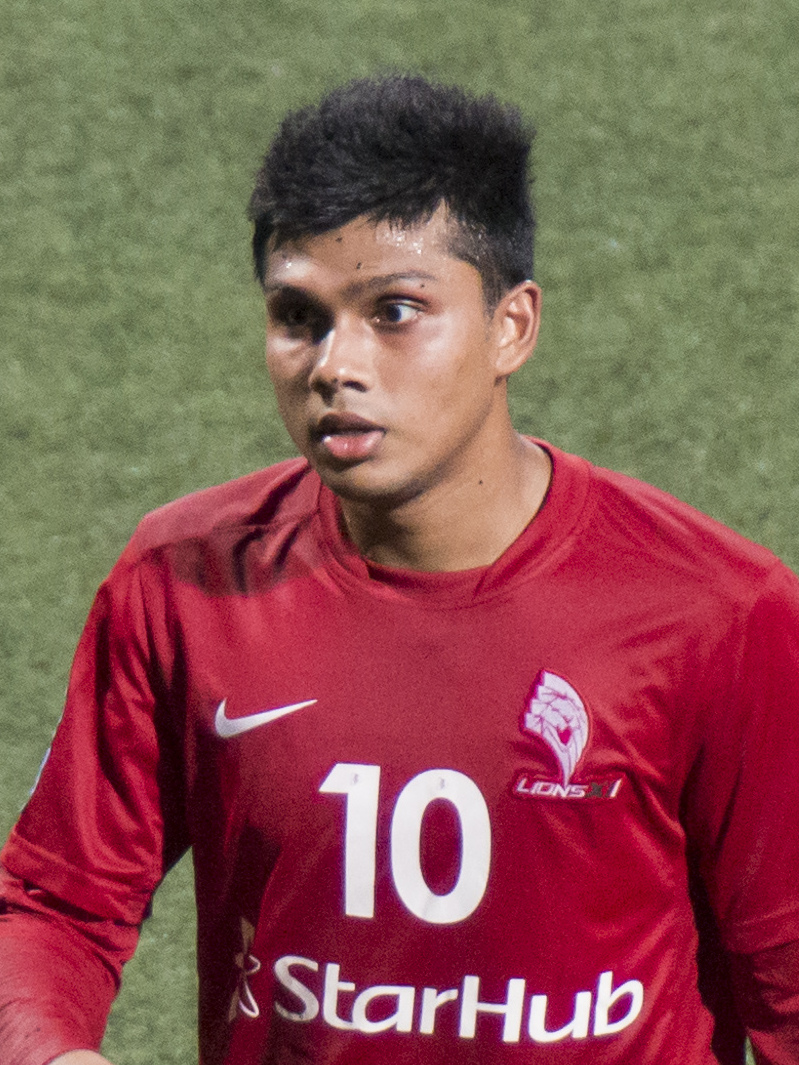
- Fazrul playing for LionsXII in 2013

Personal information
- Full name: Fazrul Nawaz bin Shahul Hameed
- Date of birth: 17 October 1985 (age 41)
- Place of birth: Singapore
- Height: 1.79 m (5 ft 10 in)
- Position: Forward

Team information
- Current team: Singapore women (assistant coach)

Senior career*
Years	Team	Apps	(Gls)
2004–2005	Geylang United	30	(20)
2006–2007	Young Lions	33	(15)
2008	Geylang United	25	(15)
2009–2010	Gombak United	46	(20)
2011–2012	Singapore Armed Forces	58	(25)
2013	LionsXII	20	(6)
2014	Home United	24	(10)
2015	Sabah FA	5	(2)
2015	Warriors FC	24	(18)
2016–2018	Tampines Rovers	42	(16)
2018–2019	Hougang United	18	(6)
2020–2021	Tampines Rovers	12	(0)
2022–2023	Warwick Knights	0	(0)

International career^{‡}
2006–2017	Singapore	87	(14)

Managerial career
- 2023–: Singapore women (assistant)
- * Club domestic league appearances and goals as of 23 May 2019 ‡ National team caps and goals as of 15:36, 5 September 2017 (UTC)

Fazrul Nawaz bin Shahul Hameed (born 17 October 1985) is a Singapore international footballer who last played as a striker or second-striker for Singapore National League club Warwick Knights and the Singapore national team.

He is the current assistant coach for the Singapore women national team.

== Club career ==
=== Geylang United ===
Fazrul went to a trial by Geylang United for Prime League players and was signed by the club in 2004. He left the club in 2006.

=== Young Lions ===
In January 2006, Fazrul signed for Young Lions.

=== Geylang United ===
He returned to Geylang in 2008. However, he was released by the club after a contractual dispute and it was reported in Malay newspapers that he had finally signed for Gombak United after strong rumours that he would join Sengkang Punggol with his former team-mates Aide Iskandar, Noh Rahman and Amos Boon. However these rumours have since been proven to be false and Fazrul has been clubless for half a year.

=== Gombak United ===
In May 2009, Gombak United coach Darren Stewart had announced that Fazrul will be joining his team. He made an immediate impact on his new team, scored 7 goals in 15 appearances for his new club. The following season, he scored 18 goals in 31 games for Gombak United, becoming the highest born local top scorer in the league.

=== SAFFC ===
In 2011, Fazrul joined SAFFC. Over the two seasons spent at SAFFC, he scored 20 goals in 58 appearances for the club.

=== LionsXII ===
Fazrul left Warriors for LionsXII in January 2013 to play in the Malaysia Super League. However, he was released in December 2013 after scoring just 4 goals in an injury-stricken season.

=== Home United ===
Fazrul then signed for Home United in 2014 and went on to score 14 goals in 34 games for the team, again becoming the highest local top scorer in that season.

=== Sabah FA ===
In December 2014, Fazrul signed a 12 months contract with the Malaysia Premier League side, Sabah FA, however he was released 4 months later after suffering from an injury on his left knee. During his 4 months stay with the Malaysian club, he managed to score twice in 5 league appearances for the team.

=== Return to the Warriors ===
Following the end of his short stint with Sabah, Fazrul rejoined old club Warriors FC on the 2015 S.League June mid-window transfer deadline after recovering from an injury sustain in Malaysia. He scored two goals in first match after rejoining his old club, leading the Warriors to a 4-1 win over their uniformed rivals Home United. In his second match of the season, he scored the only goal in a 1-0 win over Hougang United, sending the defending champions to second place in the table. Fazrul ended the season as the highest local-born scorer in the 2015 S.League season with 18 goals from 24 matches.

=== Tampines Rovers ===
In December 2015, Fazrul joined Tampines Rovers after turning down a new contract at his former club. He scored his first goal for Tampines in the second game of the season against Hougang United. Fazrul ended the season as the second highest local-born scorer with 7 goals.

=== Hougang United ===
On 13 July 2018, Fazrul joined Hougang United on a league record transfer fee of $50,000 until it was surpass by Brazilian Diego Lopes for S$2.9 million in 2021. In 2019, Fazrul became the captain of the team.

=== Return to Tampines Rovers ===
After nearly 6 months without a club, Fazrul signed for Tampines Rovers on 7 October 2020. He make his AFC Champions League debut on 25 June 2021 against Japanese club Gamba Osaka in a 2–0 lost at the Lokomotiv Stadium in Uzbekistan.

=== Warwick Knights ===
In January 2022, Fazrul signed for semi-professional team Warwick Knights which competed in the Singapore National League. In 2023, he announced his retirement from football

== International career ==
Fazrul made his international debut for Singapore on 4 June 2005, against Causeway rivals Malaysia, coming on as a substitute for Masrezwan Masturi, who had broken his nose.

On 28 December 2006, Fazrul scored his first international goal during the 2006 King's Cup in a 2–3 lost against Vietnam.

In the second leg of the 2007 AFF Championship semi-final, Fazrul scored the fourth out of five successfully converted penalties for Singapore in a penalty shootout win over Malaysia.

In the 2007 Southeast Asian Games, Fazrul's performance in the group stages was largely criticised by the fans and the media. More criticism arose when he failed to score a penalty against Malaysia. If he had scored, Singapore would have avoided favourites Thailand in the semi-final match, which Singapore eventually lost 3–0, ending the nation's hopes for a gold or silver medal. In the Bronze Medal placing match, Fazrul made amends for his poor performance by scoring a hat-trick in a 5–0 victory against Vietnam, winning the bronze medal for Singapore.

Due to an injury to his anterior cruciate ligament, sustained in a league match against Tampines Rovers, Fazrul was forced to miss the 2008 AFF Championship, in which Singapore were knocked out in the semi-finals by Vietnam.

During the 2010 FIFA World Cup qualification match against Lebanon on 26 March 2008, he scored a goal to secured a 2–0 win and get the 3 points for Singapore.

On 20 January 2010, Fazrul scored against European powerhouse, Denmark in a 5–1 lost during the 2010 King's Cup.

Prior to winning his 78th cap against Japan in a 0–3 defeat, Fazrul has amassed 9 goals in 77 appearances. He scored his 10th international goal in his 80th Singapore cap in a friendly against Myanmar on 24 March 2016. He notched his 11th goal for Singapore and the last of Head Coach Bernd Stange's reign in charge of Singapore.

Fazrul played his last international match during the 2019 AFC Asian Cup qualification match against Turkmenistan on 10 October 2017.

== Managerial career ==
=== Singapore women ===
In 2023, Fazrul was appointed the assistant coach of Singapore women national team under head coach Karim Bencherifa

== Personal life ==
Fazrul father was a national boxer who also won a Bronze Medal in a SEA Games competition in the 1970s.

He is married and has two sons and a daughter.

== Career statistics ==
=== Club ===
As of 10 Oct 2021.

Club	Season	League			Singapore Cup		League Cup		AFC Cup		Total	
Club	Season	Division	Apps	Goals	Apps	Goals	Apps	Goals	Apps	Goals	Apps	Goals
SAFSA	2011	S.League	32	15	3	1	0	0	0	0	35	16
SAFSA	2012	S.League	22	9	6	0	4	1	0	0	32	10
SAFSA	Total		54	24	9	1	4	1	0	0	67	26
Club	Season	League			FA Cup		Malaysia Cup		AFC Cup		Total	
Club	Season	Division	Apps	Goals	Apps	Goals	Apps	Goals	Apps	Goals	Apps	Goals
LionsXII	2013	Malaysia Super League	18	5	1	0	7	1	0	0	26	6
LionsXII	Total		18	5	1	0	7	1	0	0	26	6
Club	Season	League			Singapore Cup		League Cup		AFC Cup		Total	
Club	Season	Division	Apps	Goals	Apps	Goals	Apps	Goals	Apps	Goals	Apps	Goals
Home United	2014	S.League	24	10	6	1	0	0	0	0	30	11
Home United	Total		24	10	6	1	0	0	0	0	30	11
Club	Season	League			FA Cup		Malaysia Cup		AFC Cup		Total	
Club	Season	Division	Apps	Goals	Apps	Goals	Apps	Goals	Apps	Goals	Apps	Goals
Sabah FA	2015	Malaysia Premier League	5	3	0	0	0	0	0	0	5	3
Sabah FA	Total		5	3	0	0	0	0	0	0	5	3
Club	Season	League			Singapore Cup		League Cup		AFC Cup		Total	
Club	Season	Division	Apps	Goals	Apps	Goals	Apps	Goals	Apps	Goals	Apps	Goals
Warriors FC	2015	S.League	24	18	2	0	2	0	0	0	28	18
Warriors FC	Total		24	18	2	0	2	0	0	0	28	18
Tampines Rovers	2016	S.League	18	7	2	1	0	0	0	0	20	8
Tampines Rovers	2017	S.League	11	3	2	0	3	0	0	0	16	3
Tampines Rovers	2018	Singapore Premier League	13	4	0	0	0	0	6	1	19	5
Tampines Rovers	Total		42	14	4	1	3	0	6	1	55	16
Hougang United	2018	Singapore Premier League	7	1	2	0	0	0	0	0	9	1
Hougang United	2019	Singapore Premier League	12	4	0	0	0	0	0	0	12	4
Hougang United	Total		19	5	2	0	0	0	0	0	21	5
Tampines Rovers	2020	Singapore Premier League	3	0	0	0	0	0	0	0	3	0
Tampines Rovers	2021	Singapore Premier League	3	0	0	0	0	0	6	0	9	0
Tampines Rovers	Total		6	0	0	0	0	0	6	0	12	0
Warwick Knights	2022	Singapore Football League	0	0	0	0	0	0	0	0	0	0
Warwick Knights	Total		0	0	0	0	0	0	0	0	0	0
Career total			192	79	24	3	16	2	12	1	244	85

=== International goals ===
Scores and results list Singapore's goal tally first.

No	Date	Venue	Opponent	Score	Result	Competition
1	28 December 2006	National Stadium (Thailand)	Vietnam	2–2	2–3	2006 King's Cup
2	26 March 2008	Kallang, Singapore	Lebanon	2–0	2–0	2010 FIFA World Cup qualification (AFC)
3	20 January 2010	80th Birthday Stadium, Thailand	Denmark	1–5	1–5	2010 King's Cup
4	26 November 2010	Kallang, Singapore	Laos	3–0	4–0	Friendly
5	18 July 2011	Kallang, Singapore	Chinese Taipei	3–2	3–2	Friendly
6	16 October 2012	Kallang, Singapore	India	2–0	2–0	Friendly
7	1 December 2012	Shah Alam Stadium, Malaysia	Laos	2–4	2–5	2012 AFF Championship
8	6 September 2014	Hougang Stadium, Singapore	Papua New Guinea	2–0	2–1	Friendly
9	30 May 2015	Bangabandhu National Stadium, Bangabandhu, Bangladesh	Bangladesh	1–1	1–2	Friendly
10	6 June 2015	Jurong West Sports and Recreation Centre, Singapore	Brunei	4–1	4–1	Friendly
11	11 June 2015	Olympic Stadium, Phnom Penh	Cambodia	0–4	0–4	2018 FIFA World Cup qualification – AFC second round
12	13 October 2015	Singapore Sports Hub, Singapore	Cambodia	2–1	2–1	2018 FIFA World Cup qualification – AFC second round
13	24 March 2016	Jalan Besar Stadium, Singapore	Myanmar	2–1	2–1	Friendly
14	29 March 2016	Takhti Stadium (Tehran), Iran	Afghanistan	2–1	2–1	2018 FIFA World Cup qualification – AFC second round

== Honours ==
LionsXII

- Malaysia Super League: 2013

Singapore

- AFF Championship: 2007, 2012
- Southeast Asian Games Bronze Medalist: 2007
