= Morten Rasmussen (footballer, born January 1985) =

Danish footballer (born 1985)

Personal information
- Full name: Morten Nicolas Rasmussen
- Date of birth: 31 January 1985 (age 41)
- Place of birth: Valby, Copenhagen, Denmark
- Height: 1.85 m (6 ft 1 in)
- Position: Forward

Team information
- Current team: Midtjylland (assistant)

Youth career
- TST 79
- –2002: AGF

Senior career*
Years	Team	Apps	(Gls)
2002–2006	AGF	103	(28)
2006–2010	Brøndby	84	(45)
2010–2012	Celtic	10	(2)
2010	→ Mainz 05 (loan)	5	(2)
2011	→ AaB (loan)	14	(6)
2011	→ Sivasspor (loan)	11	(3)
2012–2016	FC Midtjylland	96	(37)
2016–2018	AGF	54	(27)
2018	Pogoń Szczecin	11	(1)
2018–2019	Enosis Neon Paralimni	16	(2)
Total		404	(153)

International career
2001	Denmark U16	3	(3)
2001–2002	Denmark U17	19	(17)
2002–2003	Denmark U19	11	(6)
2004	Denmark U20	6	(2)
2004–2006	Denmark U21	21	(9)
2008–2016	Denmark	13	(4)
- * Club domestic league appearances and goals

Morten Nicolas Rasmussen (born 31 January 1985) is a Danish former professional footballer, nicknamed "Duncan", who played as a forward, and current assistant coach of FC Midtjylland.

He played 13 times and scored 4 goals for the Denmark national team. Rasmussen scored 37 goals in 60 matches for various Denmark national youth sides and was named the Danish under-19 Player of the Year in 2003. He is the highest scoring player in the history of the Danish Superliga, scoring 141 goals for Aalborg BK, AGF, Brøndby and FC Midtjylland.

== Early life ==
Born in Copenhagen, Rasmussen lived in Valby until he was two years old, when he and his parents moved to Tilst, 10 km west of Aarhus.

== Club career ==
=== AGF Aarhus ===
Rasmussen started his career in the youth scheme of Aarhus top-flight club AGF. While at AGF, he earned the nickname "Duncan" due to a slight physical resemblance to former Scottish international striker Duncan Ferguson, though he stated at the time that he wasn't a particular fan of Ferguson himself.

In January 2002, Rasmussen turned professional as he signed a three-year contract with AGF, running to January 2005. He made his debut for AGF in the Danish Superliga championship in May 2002, as he played the last two games of the 2001–02 Superliga season. He made his debut in the 0–1 defeat to Lyngby on 12 May, before scoring his first goal in the 4–0 win against Silkeborg on 16 May. Following two goals in 15 games in the first half of the 2002–03 Superliga season, Rasmussen signed an improved five-year contract running until the summer of 2008.

After meagre goalscoring in his first three full seasons for AGF, scoring 17 goals in 82 games, the 2005–06 Superliga season was Rasmussen's senior-level breakthrough. Rasmussen scored 10 goals in 19 games during the first half of the season, including a scoring streak of six goals in five games. Before the winter 2005 transfer window. Following a total of 28 goals in 103 Superliga matches for AGF, Rasmussen left the club in January 2006.

=== Brøndby ===
Rasmussen was bought by the defending Superliga champions Brøndby IF, with whom he signed a five-year contract. With a price tag of 12 million DKK, he replaced striker Morten Skoubo who had been sold to Spanish club Real Sociedad. He started using the moniker "Duncan" when playing for Brøndby. His start at Brøndby was marked by an injury incurred in March 2006, and in the remaining games of the 2005–06 Superliga season, he scored one goal in six matches.

He started the 2006–07 Superliga season by scoring three goals in six games, before an injury sidelined him in August 2006. He returned in February 2007, helping Brøndby win the 2007 Royal League cup tournament, and went on to score 15 goals in 13 games in the second half of the 2006–07 Superliga season. In the 2007–08 Superliga season, Rasmussen scored seven goals in 19 games, before suffering an injury in March 2008. In that season he also helped Brøndby win the 2008 Danish Cup. The 2008–09 season was Rasmussen's first full Brøndby season without major injuries, as he scored nine goals in 25 games.

=== Celtic ===
Following 12 goals in 15 games in the first half of the 2009–10 Superliga, Rasmussen attracted the attention of Scottish Premier League club Celtic. On 25 January 2010, Rasmussen arrived in Glasgow for contract negotiations and a medical with Celtic before signing on a three-and-a-half-year deal the next day for a fee in excess of £1 million. Rasmussen exclaimed he was delighted to join the Glasgow club saying "I started at Aarhus, before going to Brondby, which was a bigger club, so moving to Celtic is another big step up for me." Rasmussen chose to abandon the moniker "Duncan" when playing for Celtic. He made his debut for Celtic on 27 January, coming on as a 60th-minute substitute for Georgios Samaras as the Hoops lost 2–1 to Hibernian and scored his first Celtic goal three days later in the 1–0 victory against Hamilton Accies. Rasmussen scored a goal in his third game for Celtic in a 4–2 win over Dunfermline Athletic in the Scottish Cup. On 17 April, he scored the winner in a 3–2 victory over Hibernian at Celtic Park.

Rasmussen rarely featured for Celtic under the management of Neil Lennon, making only four starts during his time with the club. He left Celtic in August 2012 after completing loan spells with Mainz, AaB and Sivasspor.

==== Mainz (loan) ====
In August 2010, Rasmussen signed for Bundesliga side 1. FSV Mainz 05 on a season-long loan deal from Celtic with a view to a permanent move. He made his debut against VfB Stuttgart on 21 August 2010 and scored a looping header to make it 2–0. Rasmussen scored in the next game against Wolfsburg on 28 August 2010, the side's first goal of a 4–3 away win. Rasmussen rarely featured after that making only one start and two substitute appearances for the German side after his relatively good start.

In December, Mainz's sporting director Christian Heidel announced the club would not be making a permanent move after the end of the loan deal.

==== AaB (loan) ====
In February 2011, Rasmussen signed for Danish side AaB on loan from Celtic after his loan spell with Mainz was cut short. He did not score any goals in his first five league matches for AaB in the league, but he scored six goals in the following five, including a goal against former team Brøndby.

==== Sivasspor (loan) ====
In September 2011, Rasmussen signed for Turkish side Sivasspor on a six-month loan deal. In Rasmussen's second game for the club, he was forced to play in goal after goalkeeper, Milan Borjan, had been sent off and all three substitutes had been used. Rasmussen picked up a yellow card after conceding a penalty during the match, but this was the only goal he let in.

=== Midtjylland ===
Rasmussen signed a four-year contract with Danish club Midtjylland in August 2012.

In the 2014–15 Danish Superliga season, Rasmussen scored 13 league goals in 23 appearances, helping Midtjylland to their first league title.

=== AGF ===
Rasmussen return to his first professional club, AGF, in January 2016 and signed a three-year contract.

=== Pogoń Szczecin ===
Duncan signed for Polish club Pogoń Szczecin on 30 January 2018.

== International career ==
Rasmussen made his international debut with the Danish under-16 national team in 2001, scoring three goals in three under-16 national team games. He represented Denmark at the 2002 European Under-17 Championship, scoring six goals in four games, including five goals in 20 minutes in the 6–0 win against the Finland under-17s. Having scored 17 goals in 19 matches for the under-17 national team, he moved into the under-19 national team in September 2002, still aged 17. Following six goals in 11 matches for the under-19 team, he was awarded 2003 Danish under-19 Player of the Year. On 3 September 2004, aged 19, Rasmussen got his debut for the Denmark under-21 national team. He scored eight goals in 13 games to help Denmark qualify for the 2006 European Under-21 Championship. However, at the main tournament, Rasmussen had to relinquish his place in the starting line-up to Nicklas Bendtner, though he played as a substitute in all three Denmark games. In total, Rasmussen scored nine goals in 21 games for the under-21 team.

Rasmussen made his debut for the senior Danish national team on 11 October 2008, as he played the last 13 minutes of the 3–0 win against Malta in the 2010 World Cup qualification. In January 2009, he was a part of the unofficial Denmark League XI national football team which won the 2009 King's Cup invitational tournament, under the management of Danish national coach Morten Olsen. He played a further two senior international friendly games in November 2009. In January 2010, he once again joined the League XI team for the 2010 King's Cup. Rasmussen scored for the Danish side in their first game, a 3–1 win over Poland, as his team went on to defend their title.

On 10 May 2010, Rasmussen was included in Olsen's preliminary 30-man squad for the 2010 World Cup. After first-choice striker Nicklas Bendtner picked up an injury, Rasmussen was called up for the Danish squad on 21 May to act as cover, but was eventually left out of the final 23-man squad on 28 May.

== Coaching and later career ==
After retiring at the end of the 2018/19 season, FC Midtjylland announced, that they had hired Duncan as a forward coach. Beside, Duncan also played for Denmark Series 4 team, TIF All Stars. He scored six goals in his first game which the club won 16–1. Other former players such as Kristian Bach Bak, Jens Berthel Askou and Søren Mussmann also played for TIF All Stars.

In the summer of 2021, Duncan became assistant coach for the club's U-19 team under manager Kenneth Andersen, but also still continued in the role of attack coach at the club, albeit on an individual level. On January 6, 2025, the club confirmed that Duncan would be the assistant coach for the club's Danish Superliga team under Thomas Thomasberg.

== Career statistics ==
=== Club ===
As of match played 19 May 2019

Appearances and goals by club, season and competition
Club	Season	League			National cup		League cup		Other (Note: Three appearances, one goal in the 2005–06 Royal League; five appearances, one goal in the 2006–07 Royal League)		Total	
Club	Season	Division	Apps	Goals	Apps	Goals	Apps	Goals	Apps	Goals	Apps	Goals
AGF	2001–02	Danish Superliga	2	1	0	0	–		–		2	1
AGF	2002–03	Danish Superliga	28	5	2	1	–		–		30	6
AGF	2003–04	Danish Superliga	26	4	2	1	–		–		28	5
AGF	2004–05	Danish Superliga	28	8	3	2	–		–		31	10
AGF	2005–06	Danish Superliga	19	10	1	1	–		–		20	11
AGF	Total		103	28	8	5	—		—		111	33
Brøndby	2005–06	Danish Superliga	7	2	0	0	0	0	0	0	7	2
Brøndby	2006–07	Danish Superliga	19	15	1	0	1	1	4	1	25	17
Brøndby	2007–08	Danish Superliga	19	7	1	0	–		–		20	7
Brøndby	2008–09	Danish Superliga	25	9	3	1	–		5	2	33	12
Brøndby	2009–10	Danish Superliga	15	12	3	1	–		3	1	21	14
Brøndby	Total		85	45	8	2	1	1	12	4	106	52
Celtic	2009–10	Scottish Premier League	10	2	3	1	0	0	0	0	13	3
Mainz 05 (loan)	2010–11	Bundesliga	5	2	0	0	–		–		5	2
AaB (loan)	2010–11	Danish Superliga	14	6	0	0	–		–		14	6
Sivasspor (loan)	2011–12	Süper Lig	11	3	0	0	–		–		11	3
FC Midtjylland	2012–13	Danish Superliga	27	5	0	0	–		1	0	28	5
FC Midtjylland	2013–14	Danish Superliga	30	15	1	0	–		0	0	31	15
FC Midtjylland	2014–15	Danish Superliga	23	13	0	0	–		1	0	24	13
FC Midtjylland	2015–16	Danish Superliga	16	4	1	1	–		9	3	26	8
FC Midtjylland	Total		96	37	2	1	—		11	3	109	41
AGF	2015–16	Danish Superliga	13	10	4	3	–		0	0	17	13
AGF	2016–17	Danish Superliga	24	13	1	0	–		4	3	29	16
AGF	2017–18	Danish Superliga	17	4	0	0	–		0	0	17	4
AGF	Total		54	27	5	3	—		4	3	63	33
Pogoń Szczecin	2017–18	Ekstraklasa	11	1	0	0	–		0	0	11	1
Enosis Neon Paralimni	2018–19	Cypriot First Division	16	2	3	1	–		0	0	19	3
Career total			405	153	29	13	1	1	27	10	462	177

=== International ===
Appearances and goals by national team and year
National team	Year	Apps	Goals
Denmark	2008	1	0
Denmark	2009	2	0
Denmark	2010	2	1
Denmark	2013	1	2
Denmark	2014	3	0
Denmark	2015	2	0
Denmark	2016	2	1
Total		13	4

Scores and results list Denmark's goal tally first, score column indicates score after each Rasmussen goal.

List of international goals scored by Morten Rasmussen
No.	Date	Venue	Cap	Opponent	Score	Result	Competition
1	12 October 2010	Parken Stadium, Copenhagen, Denmark	6	Cyprus	1–0	2–0	UEFA Euro 2012 qualifying
2	15 October 2013	Parken Stadium, Copenhagen, Denmark	8	Malta	1–0	6–0	2014 FIFA World Cup qualification
3	15 October 2013	Parken Stadium, Copenhagen, Denmark	8	Malta	5–0	6–0	2014 FIFA World Cup qualification
4	7 June 2016	Suita City Football Stadium, Suita, Japan	14	Bulgaria	1–0	4–0	2016 Kirin Cup

== Honours ==
Brøndby

- Danish Cup: 2007–08
- Royal League: 2006–07

FC Midtjylland

- Danish Superliga: 2014–15

Individual

- Danish under-19 Player of the Year: 2003
- Danish Superliga All-Time Top Scorer: 145 goals
