= Brylle =

Town in Assens, Southern Denmark

- Town
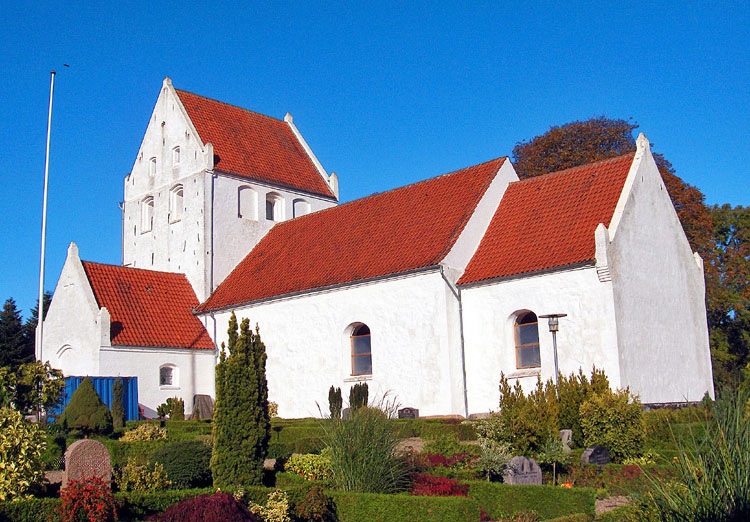
- Brylle Church

- Location in Region of Southern Denmark Brylle (Denmark)
- Coordinates: 55°19′26″N 10°14′53″E
- Country: Denmark
- Region: Southern Denmark
- Municipality: Assens Municipality

Area
  - Urban: 1 km^{2} (0.39 sq mi)

Population (2026)
  - Urban: 1,293
  - Urban density: 1,300/km^{2} (3,300/sq mi)
- Time zone: UTC+1 (CET)
  - Summer (DST): UTC+2 (CEST)
- Postal code: DK-5690 Tommerup

Brylle is a small town, with a population of 1,293 (1 January 2026), in Assens Municipality, Region of Southern Denmark in Denmark.

Brylle is situated on the island of Funen 3 km east of Tommerup and 14 km southwest of Odense.

Brylle Church, a Romanesque village church from the late 12th century, is located in the old part of the town.
