= Ebberup =

- Town
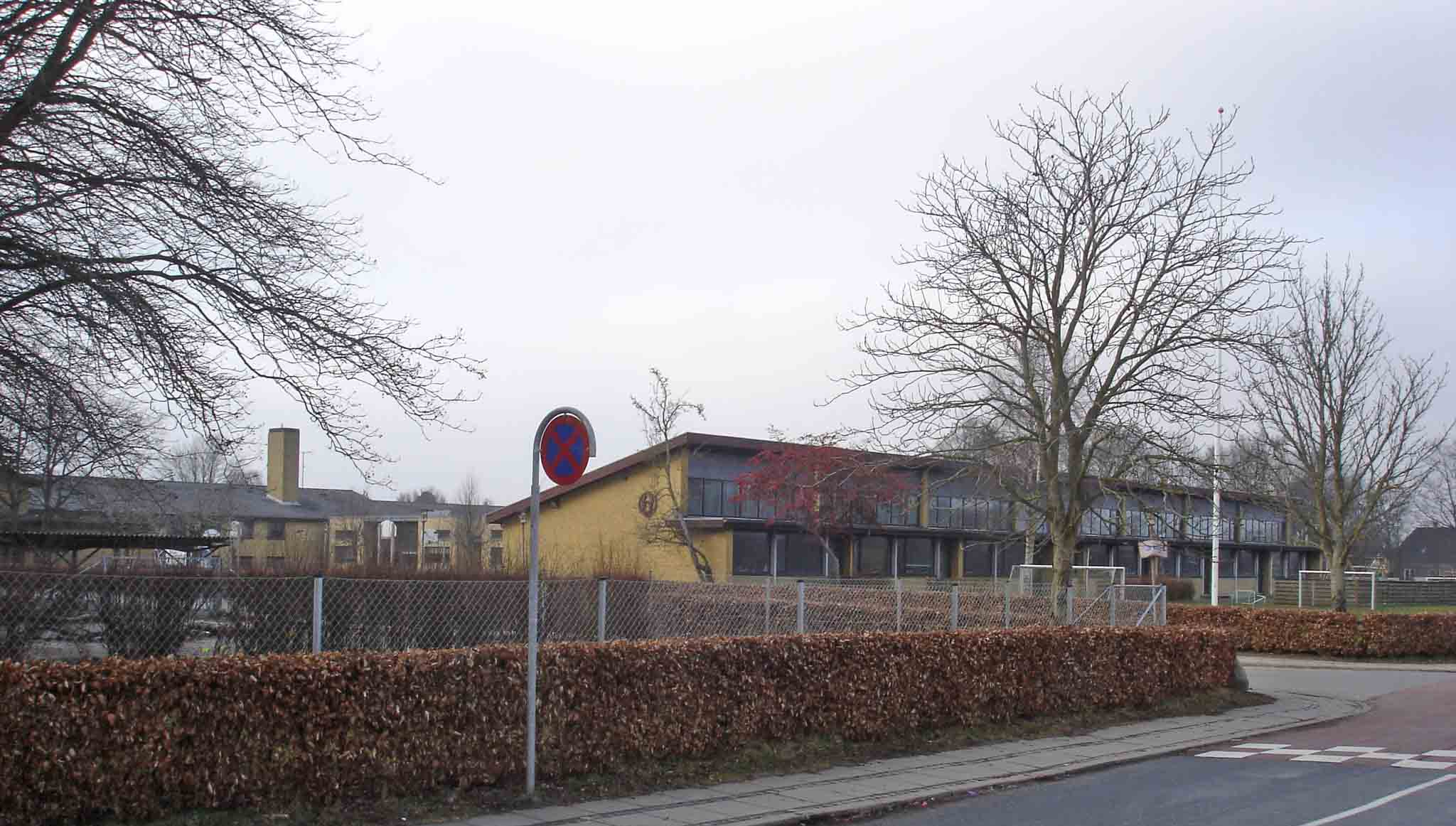
- Ebberup School

- Location in Region of Southern Denmark Ebberup (Denmark)
- Coordinates: 55°14′32″N 9°58′50″E
- Country: Denmark
- Region: Southern Denmark
- Municipality: Assens Municipality

Area
  - Urban: 1.2 km^{2} (0.46 sq mi)

Population (2026)
  - Urban: 1,227
  - Urban density: 1,000/km^{2} (2,600/sq mi)
- Time zone: UTC+1 (CET)
  - Summer (DST): UTC+2 (CEST)
- Postal code: DK-5631 Ebberup

Ebberup is a small town, with a population of 1,227 (1 January 2026), in Assens Municipality, Region of Southern Denmark in Denmark. It is situated on the western part of the island Funen, 7 km southeast of Assens, 11 km southwest of Glamsbjerg and 12 km northwest of Haarby.

== Notable people ==
- Casper Radza (born 1994 in Ebberup), a professional footballer.
