= Glamsbjerg =

- Town
- Location in Denmark Glamsbjerg (Region of Southern Denmark)
- Coordinates: 55°16′40″N 10°6′19″E
- Country: Denmark
- Region: Southern Denmark
- Municipality: Assens Municipality

Area
  - Urban: 3.1 km^{2} (1.2 sq mi)

Population (2026)
  - Urban: 3,308
  - Urban density: 1,100/km^{2} (2,800/sq mi)
  - Gender: 1,671 males and 1,637 females
- Time zone: UTC+1 (CET)
  - Summer (DST): UTC+2 (CEST)
- Postal code: DK-5620 Glamsbjerg

Glamsbjerg is a town in central Denmark with a population of 3,308 (1 January 2026), located in Assens municipality on the island of Funen in Region of Southern Denmark.

Glamsbjerg is a comparatively new town in Denmark. It came to be in 1884 when the railroad between Tommerup Stationsby and Assens was opened. Many of the houses in Glamsbjerg are from 1900.

Before Glamsbjerg was a "town" it was a village in Køng parish. It appears on the first page of the Køng churchbook (parish register) in 1687 at the baptism of Jeppe, son of Simon Ibsen of Glamsberg. The spelling "Glamsbjerg" first appears in 1694. In the 1801 census, the population of Glamsbjerg was 158 persons in 32 households.

Krengerup, a large Neoclassical manor house and estate, is located some 4 km (2.5 mi) to the north of Glamsbjerg.

== Notable people ==
- Karl Skytte (1908 in Glamsbjerg – 1986) a Danish politician and member of Folketinget 1947–1978
- Johan Absalonsen (born 1985 in Flemløse near Glamsbjerg) a footballer, almost 400 club caps and 2 for Denmark
