= Martin Spelmann =

Danish footballer (born 1987)

Personal information
- Date of birth: March 21, 1987 (age 39)
- Place of birth: Hvidovre, Denmark
- Height: 1.76 m (5 ft 9 in)
- Position: Midfielder

Team information
- Current team: Hvidovre IF (U23 manager); Denmark U16 (assistant)

Youth career
- 1992–1998: Rosenhøj BK
- 1999–2005: Brøndby

Senior career*
Years	Team	Apps	(Gls)
2005–2008	Brøndby	41	(1)
2008–2013	Horsens	117	(14)
2013–2015	OB	61	(8)
2015–2016	Gençlerbirliği	14	(0)
2016–2019	AGF	74	(7)
2019	Strømsgodset	11	(0)
2020	Mjällby	6	(0)
2021–2025	Hvidovre	113	(3)
Total		437	(33)

International career
2002	Denmark U16	1	(0)
2003–2004	Denmark U17	9	(0)
2004–2005	Denmark U18	3	(0)
2004–2006	Denmark U19	12	(1)
2006	Denmark U20	2	(0)
2006–2008	Denmark U-21	6	(0)

Managerial career
- 2025–: Hvidovre (U23 manager)
- 2026–: Denmark U16 (assistant)
- * Club domestic league appearances and goals

Martin Spelmann (born 21 March 1987) is a retired Danish professional footballer who played as a midfielder and current manager of Hvidovre IF's U23 team.

Spelmann is a defensive midfielder, but can also play as a fullback and wingback, as well as on a wing position on the right flank.

== Career ==
He signed for Strømsgodset in February 2019, prior to the 2019 season, but was released from the club after one season.

After a year at Mjällby in Sweden, Spelmann returned to Denmark and signed with Hvidovre IF on 2 June 2021. In the summer of 2025, Spelmann extended his contract at Hvidovre until the end of the year, and was simultaneously appointed head coach of the club's U23/reserve team, which played in the Denmark Series.

On 29 November 2025, Spelmann confirmed that he had decided to retire from playing, but would continue at Hvidovre as the U23 coach. In February 2026, Spellmann was appointed as assistant coach of the Denmark U16 national team, replacing Nicolai Boilesen. He took on the role alongside his position as U23 manager at Hvidovre.
