= Flemløse =

- Village
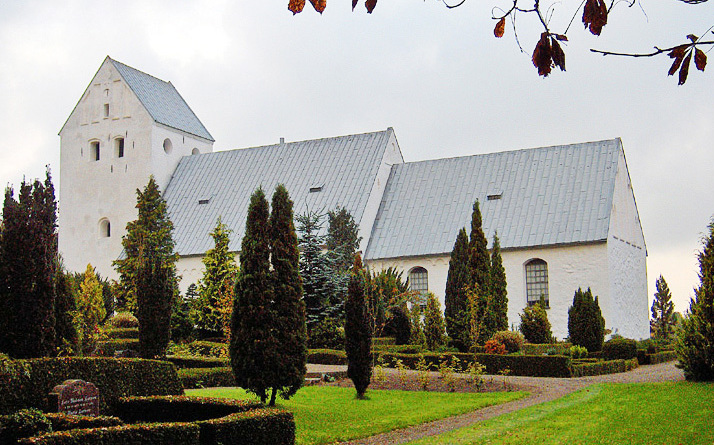
- Flemløse Church

- Location in Region of Southern Denmark Flemløse (Denmark)
- Coordinates: 55°15′4″N 10°4′2″E
- Country: Denmark
- Region: Southern Denmark
- Municipality: Assens Municipality

Population (2026)
  - Total: 572
- Postal code: DK-5620 Glamsbjerg

Flemløse is a village, with a population of 572 (1 January 2026), in Assens Municipality, Region of Southern Denmark in Denmark.

Flemløse is situated on the island of Funen 5 km southwest of Glamsbjerg, 6 km northwest of Haarby and 13 km east of Assens.

Flemløse Church, dating back to around 1100, is located in the northern part of the village.

== Notable people ==
- Johan Absalonsen (born 1985 in Flemløse), a former professional footballer
