= Rajko Lekić =

Danish footballer (born 1981)

Personal information
- Full name: Radivoje Lekić
- Date of birth: 3 July 1981 (age 45)
- Place of birth: Copenhagen, Denmark
- Height: 1.87 m (6 ft 2 in)
- Position: Striker

Team information
- Current team: BSF
- Number: 10

Senior career*
Years	Team	Apps	(Gls)
1998–2001	B93	1	(0)
2001–2002	BK Avarta	15	(16)
2002–2003	Herfølge BK	17	(9)
2003	Fremad Amager	12	(6)
2003–2004	Silkeborg IF	34	(30)
2004–2006	Xerez	38	(16)
2006–2007	OB	9	(2)
2007	→ Zalaegerszeg (loan)	14	(6)
2007–2008	Esbjerg fB	23	(6)
2008	→ Silkeborg IF (loan)	15	(15)
2009–2011	Silkeborg IF	61	(22)
2011	New England Revolution	23	(6)
2012	Lyngby BK	11	(4)
2012–2014	FC Roskilde	19	(9)
2014–	BSF		

International career
2010	Denmark League XI	3	(2)
2010	Denmark	1	(0)

Managerial career
- 2014–: BSF (playing forward coach)
- * Club domestic league appearances and goals as of 24 February 2015

Radivoje "Rajko" Lekić (born 3 July 1981) is a Danish footballer who currently plays for Ballerup-Skovlunde as a playing forward coach.

He has played for New England Revolution, B 93, BK Avarta, Herfølge BK, Fremad Amager, Silkeborg IF, Odense BK, Lyngby BK and Esbjerg fB in Denmark, as well as Spanish club Xerez CD and Hungarian Zalaegerszegi TE. Lekić is of Montenegrin descent but was born and raised in Denmark.

== Career ==
=== Club ===
Lekić began his career with Danish side B 93 in 1998 and remained at the club for 3 years, getting his professional debut in the Danish Superliga on 16 June 1999 in a 2–1 win again AGF Aarhus. But it became his only league game for the club. So during the 2001 season he joined the Danish 4th tier club BK Avarta and became an instant success, as he tallied 16 goals in just 15 matches, making him topscorer in the Denmark Series and earning him a contract as full-time professional for Danish 1st Division side Herfølge BK in January 2002. He continued to be a topscorer netting 9 goals in 13 matches, but in the second half of the season he was showing poor form. So in 2003 he signed a half-year contract with Danish 2nd Division side Fremad Amager and appeared in 12 matches scoring 6 goals and helping the club to win promotion to the Danish 1st Division. But he did not get his contract extended. So he chose to join another Danish 1st Division side Silkeborg IF, the club with which he would have his greatest success. In his first spell with Silkeborg Lekić would net 30 goals in just 34 appearances. He became Danish 1st Division topscorer, helped Silkeborg to promotion to the Danish Superliga and his goal scoring prowess did not go unnoticed on the Continent. In 2004 Lekić was signed by Xerez CD of Spain's Segunda División. In two season with Xerez Lekić appeared in 38 league matches and scored 6 goals. The following seasons he would join OB, Zalaegerszegi, and Esbjerg fB but struggled to find the form that had made him a highly regarded striker.

In 2008, he returned to Silkeborg IF on loan and quickly recaptured his scoring form tallying 15 goals in 15 appearances. As a result, Silkeborg IF purchased his contract and he remained at the club on a permanent basis. During this second spell with Silkeborg IF Lekić appeared in 76 league matches and scored 37 goals. During his two stints with Silkeborg IF Lekić appeared in 121 official matches and scored 76 goals.

==== Major League Soccer ====
Lekić signed with New England Revolution on 8 April 2011. contract terms were not disclosed. He made his Revolution debut on April 17 in a 1–0 loss to the Houston Dynamo, and scored his first goal on 23 April, in a 3–2 win over Sporting Kansas City. He made his first start for the New England Revolution on 17 April 2011 in a game against the Houston Dynamo. In 23 games, Lekic registered six goals and one assist, second in scoring to Shalrie Joseph. After the season, he could not agree terms with New England and instead signed with Lyngby Boldklub of the Danish Superliga on 31 January 2012.

==== Later career ====
On 10 August 2012, Lekic was released from Lyngby BK.

=== International ===
Lekić was born in Denmark and is of Montenegrin descent. He made his debut for the Danish national team against Austria in which he came on as a 61st-minute substitute for Nicklas Bendtner.
