= Tommerup =

- Town
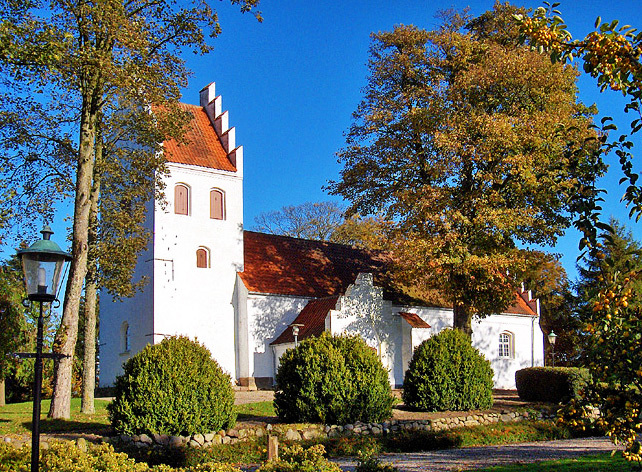
- Tommerup Church in 2006

- Location in Region of Southern Denmark Tommerup (Denmark)
- Coordinates: 55°19′28″N 10°12′9″E
- Country: Denmark
- Region: Southern Denmark
- Municipality: Assens Municipality

Area
  - Urban: 1.39 km^{2} (0.54 sq mi)

Population (2026)
  - Urban: 1,573
  - Urban density: 1,130/km^{2} (2,930/sq mi)
- Time zone: UTC+1 (CET)
  - Summer (DST): UTC+2 (CEST)
- Postal code: DK-5690 Tommerup

Tommerup is a town in central Denmark with a population of 1,573 (1 January 2026), located in Assens Municipality on the island of Funen.

Although Tommerup was the municipal seat of the former Tommerup Municipality, it was just the second largest town of the municipality, surpassed by Tommerup Stationsby.

== Notable people ==
- Karen Egdal (born 1978 in Tommerup) a Danish former swimmer who won two silver medals in the 50 m butterfly event at the European championships in 2000 and competed at the 1996 Summer Olympics
