= Jesper Bech =

Danish footballer (born 1982)

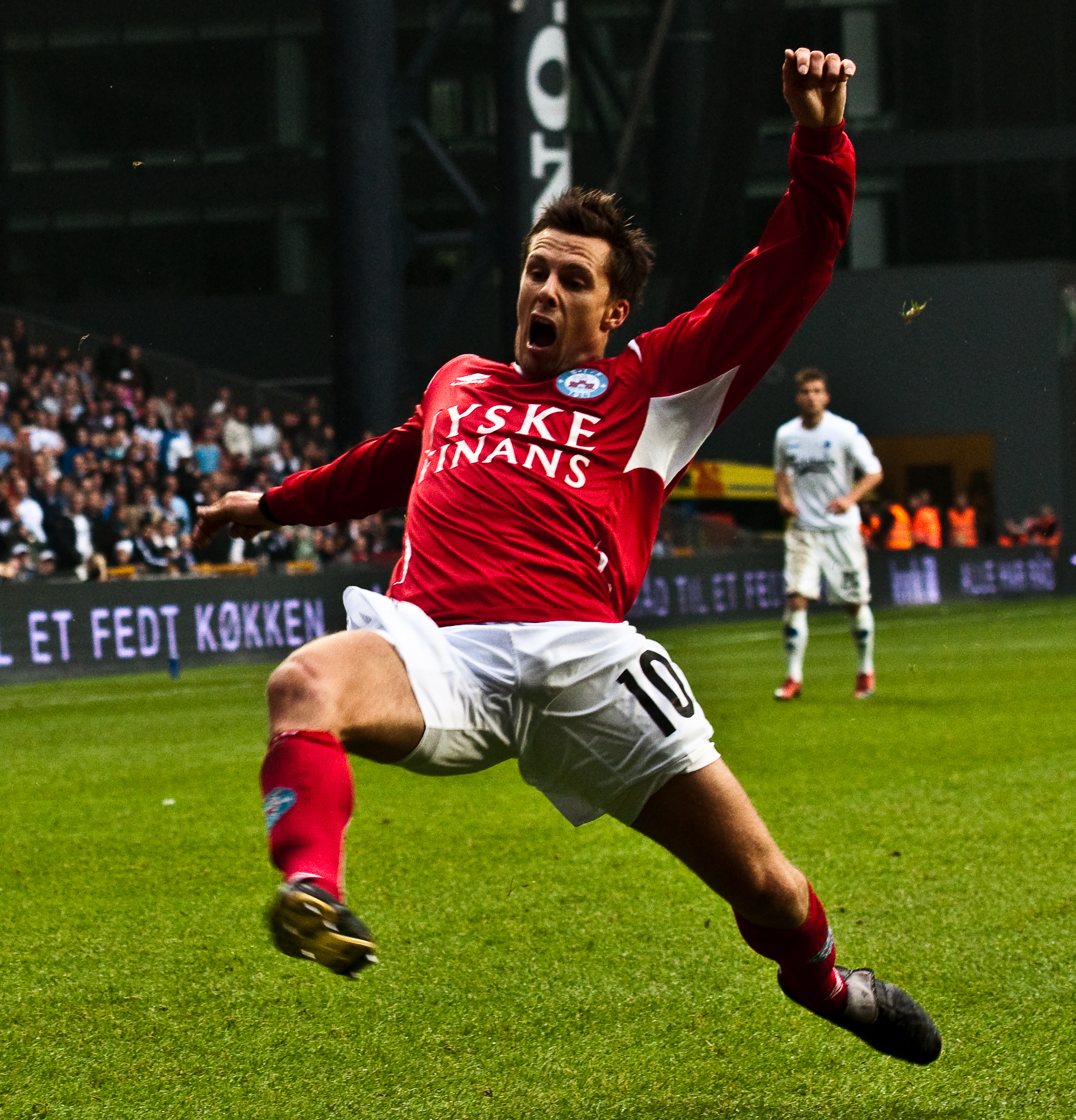

Personal information
- Date of birth: 25 May 1982 (age 44)
- Place of birth: Denmark
- Height: 1.78 m (5 ft 10 in)
- Position: Striker

Youth career
- Ålholm IF
- Skjold Birkerød
- B 1903
- Lyngby
- KB

Senior career*
Years	Team	Apps	(Gls)
2002–2005	Copenhagen	37	(12)
2005–2006	Malmö FF	24	(1)
2006–2009	Esbjerg fB	76	(20)
2009–2015	Silkeborg	132	(28)
2015–2016	Roskilde	26	(1)

International career
2001	Denmark U19	1	(0)
2003	Denmark U21	1	(0)
2006–2009	Denmark	2	(1)
- * Club domestic league appearances and goals

Jesper Bech (born 25 May 1982) is a Danish former professional footballer. He played as a striker. He has gained two caps for the Denmark national team.

== Biography ==
Bech played his youth years for Ålholm IF, Skjold Birkerød, B 1903, Lyngby BK and KB. He got his national breakthrough with F.C. Copenhagen in the Danish Superliga championship, where he debuted in April 2004. He scored seven goals in nine games during his first season, and helped the club win the 2003–04 Danish Superliga title as well as the 2004 Danish Cup trophy. In the following season, sharp competition from strikers Alvaro Santos and Sibusiso Zuma kept Bech out of his preferred striker role. He was either used as a substitute, or in the role of winger. Bech transferred to Swedish club Malmö FF in the summer 2005.

At Malmö, he looked to replace Swedish international striker Markus Rosenberg before the UEFA Champions League qualification, but Bech never got a breakthrough at the club. Following one year at Malmö, he moved back to Denmark to play for Esbjerg fB in the summer 2006. In the first half of the 2006–07 Superliga season, Bech rediscovered his goal scoring form, and was at a time the joint top goalscorer of the league. On 15 November 2006 he got his Danish national team debut in a friendly match against the Czech Republic, when he came on the pitch in the second half, as a substitute for Peter Løvenkrands.

== Honours ==
- Danish Superliga: 2004
- Danish Cup: 2004
- Danish Super Cup: 2004
