= 80th Birthday Stadium =

Soccer stadium in Korat, Thailand

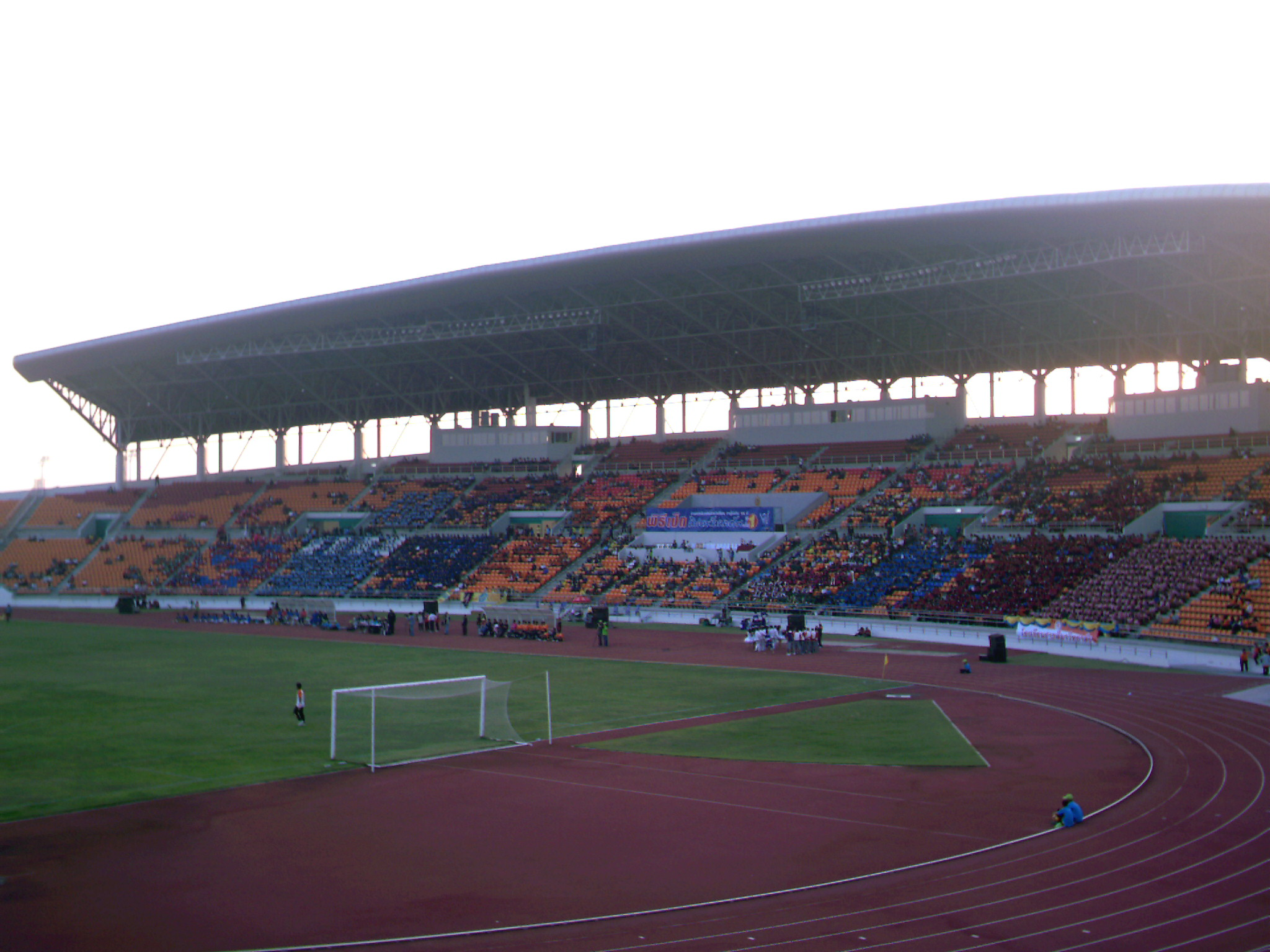
- Interactive map of 80th Birthday Stadium
- Full name: His Majesty the King's 80th Birthday Anniversary, 5th December 2007 Stadium
- Former names: 333rd Nakhon Ratchasima Anniversary Stadium
- Location: Mueang Nakhon Ratchasima, Thailand
- Coordinates: 14°55′38″N 102°02′56″E
- Capacity: 25,000
- Surface: Grass

Construction
- Groundbreaking: 28 March 2005; 21 years ago
- Built: March 2005 - July 2007
- Opened: December 2007; 18 years ago (officially opened in December 2007, Finished in July 2007)
- Cost: US$65 million (cost of entire SEA Games complex)

Tenant
- Nakhon Ratchasima F.C. (2009–present)

The 80th Birthday Stadium is a sports facility in Nakhon Ratchasima (Korat), Nakhon Ratchasima Province, Thailand. It is the main stadium in His Majesty the King's 80th Birthday Anniversary, 5 December 2007, Sports Complex. It is home to Nakhon Ratchasima FC, a professional team, and it was used for the 2007 Southeast Asian Games which coincided with the 80th birthday of King Bhumibol Adulyadej, hence the name of the venue.

== History ==
The stadium is in the former SEA Games sports complex on Highway 304 (Pak Thong Chai Road) southwest of the city of Nakhon Ratchasima. The stadium is all-seated with space for 24,641 spectators. The tribunes form a continuous ring, almost a perfect circle, around the pitch and running track. The stands are uncovered on three sides but a huge cantilevered roof provides cover for about 7,000 seats on one side where the ring rises to approximately double the height of the tribune it faces. Most of the seats in the stadium are bright orange (the same colour as Nakhon Ratchasima FC's home kit) and are the fixed-bucket style. But in the main stand some of the seats at the top of the tribune are red and those in the VIP section are not fixed bucket but the tip-up type favoured in the UK. In the lower sections of the main stand the initials "SAT" (Sports Authority of Thailand) are picked out in blue. The equivalent letters in Thai script are also picked out in blue. There are commentary boxes and private suites at the top of the main stand. There is also a large royal box in the middle of the main stand. At the north end of the stadium is a large scoreboard. At the opposite end are the three flagpoles used for the SEA Games and the place where the "Olympic" flame burned.

The concourses are basic and continue around the entire stadium. As with most Thai stadiums, the entrances lead directly into the seating areas with little in the way of facilities for supporters save for some modern and well-appointed toilets. The pitch is one of the better ones to be found in Thailand and is known to drain well in the rainy season. There are two floodlight systems in use at the stadium. There are roof-mounted lights on the main stand side and there are four very tall concrete pylons which stand outside the stadium. Both systems were installed because when the SEA Games was in progress the running track, pitch, sand pits, high-jump, pole vault and shot-put areas had to be illuminated simultaneously.

The large stadium also has its own "Lesser Hampden". Just opposite the main entrance to the stadium itself is a floodlit pitch, complete with a running track and a small stand. This modest arena would be large enough to host Nakhon Ratchasima FC matches but the ground doesn't meet league standards as it is not enclosed and the floodlights are not powerful enough for evening matches. However, Nakhon Ratchasima did use the ground for a pre-season friendly in March 2009 against Khonkaen FC.

Nakhon Ratchasima FC moved into the stadium in June 2008, having previously played at the Nakhon Ratchasima Municipal Stadium. The move was initially on a trial basis: if it wasn't deemed a success, then the club would return to the Municipal Stadium. However, the switch has proven a success, therefore, the Swat Cats continue to use the stadium for their home matches.

In 2025, Yemen national football team used the stadium as their home matches for the 2027 AFC Asian Cup qualification.

In 2026, the stadium was used again for the ceremonies and athletics of 2025 ASEAN Para Games, which held in January.

== Stadium and locations ==
Locations of 80th Birthday Stadium

Coordinates	Location	Stadium	Capacity	Year
14°55′38″N 102°02′56″E	Nakhon Ratchasima	80th Birthday Stadium	25,000	2007–present

== Photos ==
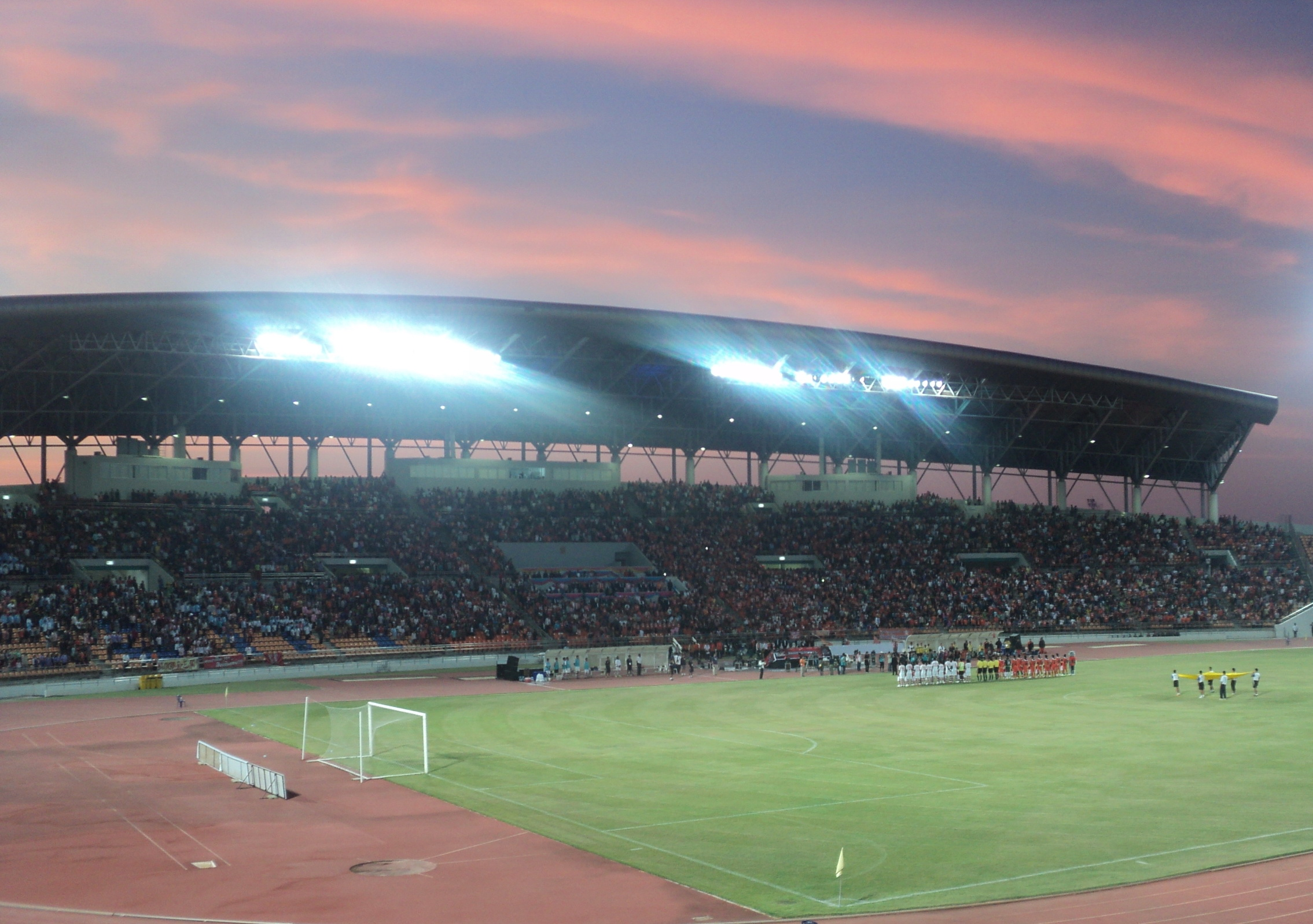

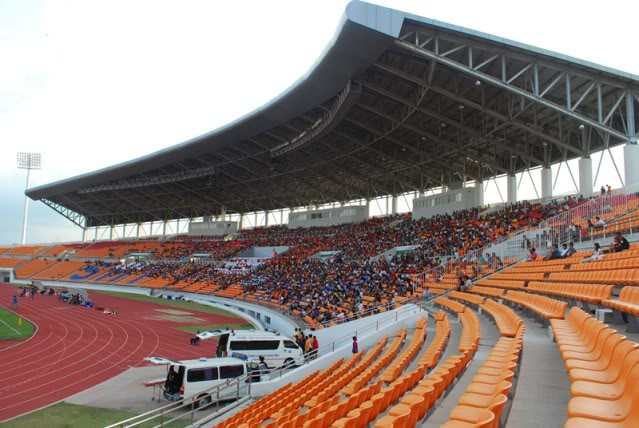

== International matches hosted ==
Date	Competition	Team #1	Res.	Team #2	Attendance
17 January 2010	2010 King's Cup	Thailand	1–0	Singapore	
20 January 2010	2010 King's Cup	Poland	3–1	Thailand	
23 January 2010	2010 King's Cup	Poland	6–1	Singapore	
9 November 2014	Friendly	Thailand	3–0	Philippines	
18 November 2014	Friendly	Thailand	2–0	New Zealand	
25 March 2025	2027 AFC Asian Cup qualification	Yemen		Lebanon	
14 October 2025	2027 AFC Asian Cup qualification	Yemen		Brunei	
18 November 2025	2027 AFC Asian Cup qualification	Yemen		Bhutan	
