= Johan Absalonsen =

Danish footballer (born 1985)

Personal information
- Full name: Johan Hindsgaul Absalonsen
- Date of birth: 16 September 1985 (age 41)
- Place of birth: Flemløse, Denmark
- Height: 1.77 m (5 ft 10 in)
- Position: Left winger

Youth career
- Flemløse Boldklub
- Glamsbjerg IF
- B 1913

Senior career*
Years	Team	Apps	(Gls)
2002	B 1913	2	(0)
2004–2006	Brøndby	44	(6)
2006–2010	OB	156	(25)
2011–2012	Copenhagen	9	(0)
2012	→ Horsens (loan)	9	(1)
2012–2017	SønderjyskE	125	(27)
2017–2018	Adelaide United	12	(6)
2018–2020	SønderjyskE	53	(9)
Total		410	(74)

International career
2000–2001	Denmark U-16	5	(0)
2001–2002	Denmark U-17	15	(1)
2002	Denmark U-18	3	(2)
2003–2004	Denmark U-19	8	(2)
2004	Denmark U-20	2	(0)
2004–2006	Denmark U-21	10	(1)
2009	Denmark	2	(1)
- * Club domestic league appearances and goals

Johan Hindsgaul Absalonsen (born 16 September 1985) is a Danish former professional footballer who played as a left winger. He has played two games and scored one goal for the Denmark national team.

== Club career ==
=== B1913 ===
Born in Flemløse near Glamsbjerg, Absalonsen started playing football for local clubs, before he entered the youth scheme of B 1913. He played two senior matches for B 1913, before moving to the reserve team of defending Danish champions Brøndby IF in 2003.

=== Brøndby ===
Absalonsen joined Brøndby IF on 3 January 2003 at the age of 17. He was a part of the 'talent-squad' at Brøndby, and extended his contract in January 2004.

He made his Brøndby senior debut in the February 2004 UEFA Cup home game against Barcelona. He was a part of the Double winning team of both the 2004–05 Superliga championship and 2004–05 Danish Cup trophy, scoring four goals in 14 Superliga games that season. As he struggled to claim a starting position in the team, he moved on in summer 2006, having played a total 66 games for Brøndby.

=== OB ===
He joined Superliga rivals Odense Boldklub (OB), where he soon claimed a position as a first time regular, as he played 28 of 33 games in his first season at the club. He was named Danish Cup Fighter as OB won the 2006–07 Danish Cup. He played his 100th Superliga game for OB in a 1–1 draw against SønderjyskE on 13 March 2010.

=== Later career ===
In January 2011 he joined Copenhagen. Absalonsen would appear in three league matches for Copenhagen during the rest of the 2010–11 season, winning his second Danish league title. In January 2012, after only appearing in 6 league matches during the first half of the 2011–12 season and having not scored a goal in any competition, he joined AC Horsens on loan until summer 2012. Following his loan spell to Horsens, in August 2012, he moved on a permanent transfer to SønderjyskE where he would become a key player. He left the club in the summer 2017. In July 2017, Absalonsen moved abroad for the first time in his career, signing a one-year deal with Australian side Adelaide United.

Absalonsen returned to Denmark for family reasons, once again to play for SønderjyskE, in May 2018. During the 2019–20 season, Absalonsen would help the club win the Danish Cup, scoring in their third round victory over Hvidovre IF on 25 September 2019. He left the club at the end of 2020.

=== Retirement ===
On 29 January 2021, Absalonsen announced his retirement from professional football to study law at the University of Southern Denmark.

== International career ==
Absalonsen started his international career while at B 1913, when he made his debut for the Danish under-16 national team in November 2000. He played a total 43 matches for various Danish national youth teams until October 2006, including 10 games and one goal for the Denmark under-21 national team. He took part in all four Danish games at the 2002 European Under-17 Championship. In May 2006, he was selected for the under-21 national squad for the 2006 European Under-21 Championship tournament. He played one match at the tournament, coming on as a substitute for Jonas Kamper in Denmark's last game.

He was called up for the senior Denmark national football team by national manager Morten Olsen, for two friendly matches against South Korea and the United States in November 2009. He took part in both games, and scored his first national team goal in the 3–1 win against the United States.

== Honours ==
=== Club ===
Brøndby

- Danish Superliga: 2004–05
- Danish Cup: 2004–05

OB

- Danish Cup: 2006–07

Copenhagen

- Danish Superliga: 2010–11

SønderjyskE

- Danish Cup: 2019–20

=== Individual ===
- Danish Cup Fighter: 2007
