= Martin Ørnskov =

Danish footballer (born 1985)

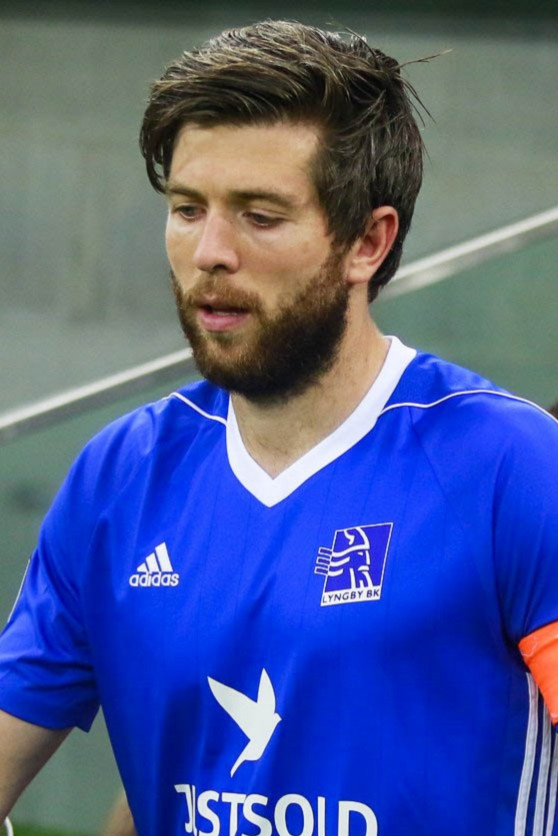
- Ørnskov with Lyngby in 2017

Personal information
- Full name: Martin Ørnskov Nielsen
- Date of birth: 10 October 1985 (age 41)
- Place of birth: Silkeborg, Denmark
- Height: 1.85 m (6 ft 1 in)
- Position: Midfielder

Team information
- Current team: Lyngby (U-19 assistant)

Youth career
- 1991–2004: Silkeborg

Senior career*
Years	Team	Apps	(Gls)
2004–2012	Silkeborg	143	(8)
2012–2013	Viking	43	(4)
2013–2016	Brøndby	100	(3)
2016–2020	Lyngby	105	(2)
Total		374	(17)

International career
2006	Denmark U21	1	(0)

Managerial career
- 2021–: Lyngby (U-19 assistant)
- * Club domestic league appearances and goals

Martin Ørnskov Nielsen (Danish pronunciation: [ˈɶɐ̯nskʌwˀ]; born 10 October 1985) is a Danish retired professional footballer.

Ørnskov began playing football at age 5 in the Silkeborg IF academy and came through the ranks to make well over 100 appearances in all competitions for them. He moved to Norwegian side Viking in 2012, where he had a short spell before moving back to Denmark to join Brøndby IF in 2013. After three years in Brøndby, Ørnskov signed with Lyngby BK in 2016, experiencing both European football, relegation and promotion in three years. He became club captain for Lyngby in 2018. In 2020, Ørnskov announced his retirement after suffering a concussion the season before.

== Club career ==
=== Silkeborg ===
Born in Silkeborg, Ørnskov was a part of the Silkeborg IF youth academy from age 5, and signed his first contract with the club in June 2004 after making his first-team debut a month earlier. In December 2004, he became a full-time professional in the club after playing more regularly during the fall of the 2004–05 season in the Danish Superliga. Ørnskov played for Silkeborg IF until 2012, making 207 total appearances for the club.

=== Viking ===
On 15 February 2012, Ørnskov joined Norwegian Tippeligaen club Viking FK on a three-year contract, six months before the expiration of his contract in Silkeborg. On 26 March 2012, he made his debut as a starter in an away match against Sandnes Ulf that ended in a 2–2 draw. Ørnskov ended the 2012 season with 28 league appearances in which he scored four goals.

=== Brøndby ===
On 5 July 2013, Ørnskov transferred to Danish Superliga club Brøndby IF on a three-year contract for an undisclosed fee. Brøndby-coach, Thomas Frank called the signing a "perfect fit" and lauded Ørnskov's potential as a leader. He made his debut for the club on 21 July 2013, assisting Andrew Hjulsager's goal in a match that ended in a 1–1 draw against FC Vestsjælland. After the game he praised the Brøndby-fans for their support. He made 31 appearances in his first season back in Denmark, scoring three goals and helping Brøndby to a fourth place which secured Europa League qualifiers.

On 31 July 2014, Ørnskov made his European debut, playing 86 minutes of the Europa League third-qualifying round fixture against Belgian club Club Brugge which resulted in a 3–0 loss for Brøndby. In the league, he ended the season on 30 appearances as Brøndby finished in third place.

The 2015–16 season saw less playing time for Ørnskov, as Christian Nørgaard emerged as a starter at his position on defensive midfield. He made 32 total appearances, most of them as a substitute. Ørnskov departed Brøndby as his contract with the club expired in June 2016.

=== Lyngby ===
On 20 June 2016, Ørnskov signed a two-year contract with Lyngby BK. He scored his first goal for Lyngby in his first return to Brøndby Stadion, securing a 2–0 win over his old club. That season he made 38 appearances in which he scored one goal as Lyngby surprisingly ended in third place and qualified for the Europa League.

The following season, Lyngby were relegated from the Danish Superliga after losing in decisive play-off matches to Vendsyssel FF after a terrible season where the club was on the verge of economic collapse. Ørnskov ended the 2017–18 season with 42 appearances and two goals.

Ørnskov signed a one-year contract extension on 4 July 2018, keeping him a part of De Kongeblå at least until 2019. Later that month, coach Mark Strudal appointed Ørnskov as new club captain, replacing Mathias Tauber who had captained the side for more than six years. Tauber's contract with the club was terminated the same day. Despite the rocky start to the season, Ørnskov captained Lyngby to promotion to the Danish Superliga after only one season in the second tier.

Following the promotion, Ørnskov signed another one-year contract extension on 4 June 2019. Ørnskov officially confirmed on 21 August 2020, that he had retired after suffering a concussion the previous season.

== Coaching career ==
In March 2021, Ørnskov revealed that he had been appointed as an assistant coach to Lyngby BK's U-19 team.
