= Jim Larsen =

Danish footballer (born 1985)

Personal information
- Date of birth: 6 November 1985 (age 40)
- Place of birth: Korsør, Denmark
- Height: 1.90 m (6 ft 3 in)
- Position: Centre-back

Youth career
- Korsør FF
- Slagelse B&I
- AGF

Senior career*
| Years | Team | Apps | (Gls) |
| 2003–2005 | Grenaa IF | | |
| 2005–2007 | Brabrand | 50 | (5) |
| 2007–2011 | Silkeborg | 84 | (5) |
| 2011–2012 | Rosenborg | 40 | (8) |
| 2012–2014 | Club Brugge | 12 | (0) |
| 2014–2016 | Midtjylland | 16 | (3) |
| Total | | 202 | (21) |
- * Club domestic league appearances and goals

Jim Larsen (born 6 November 1985) is a Danish former professional footballer who played as a centre-back.

== Club career ==
=== Early years ===
Larsen was born in Korsør, West Zealand, Denmark, and from an early age joined the AGF academy of Hessel Gods Fodboldkostskole in tenth grade, where he was coached by the likes of Flemming Povlsen and Lars Lundkvist, and played for Grenaa IF's team in the Jutland Series and Denmark Series. He then left AGF and followed Lundkvist to Brabrand, where he played for two years in the second-tier Danish 1st Division, before signing with Silkeborg.

=== Rosenborg ===
On 12 March 2011, Larsen signed a four-year contract with Tippeligaen club Rosenborg. In his debut season at the club, he scored six goals as Rosenborg finished in a disappointing third place.

=== Club Brugge ===
In July 2012, Larsen moved to Club Brugge. His stay in Belgium was unsuccessful—after only 17 appearances and one goal, Larsen left the club due to recurring injuries.

=== Midtjylland ===
On 15 August 2014, it was announced that Larsen had signed a one-year contract with Midtjylland. He made his debut on the same day as replacement for the injured Erik Sviatchenko in a 2–1 victory against FC Copenhagen. In January 2015, he signed a one-year contract extension with the club until July 2016. In his first season at the club, Larsen made 18 appearances for Midtjylland and scored three goals, as the team won their first Superliga title.

After struggling with injuries during large parts of the 2015–16 season, Larsen announced that he was retiring from football at the age of 30.

== International career ==
On 11 October 2009, Larsen was called up for the Danish national team for a 2010 FIFA World Cup qualifier against Hungary, after Per Krøldrup was injured.

== Honours ==
Midtjylland

- Danish Superliga: 2014–15 season
