= Listed buildings in Tønder Municipality =

This is a list of listed buildings in Tønder Municipality, Denmark.

== The list ==
=== 6240 Løgumkloster ===
Listing name	Image	Location	Coordinates	Description
Løgumkloster Præstegård		Storegade 7, 6240 Løgumkloster		
Øster-Højst gamle Skole		Kirkevej 2, 6240 Løgumkloster		

=== 6261 Bredebro ===
Listing name	Image	Location	Coordinates	Description
Ballum Missionshus		Vesterende 28, 6261 Bredebro		
Gammel Bosholm		Brede Bygade 53, 6261 Bredebro		
Gammel Bosholm		Brede Bygade 53, 6261 Bredebro		
Harknagvej 23		Harknagvej 23, 6261 Bredebr		
Høybergvej 12		Høybergvej 12, 6261 Bredebro		
Høybergvej 14		Høybergvej 14, 6261 Bredebro		
Høybergvej 16		Høybergvej 16, 6261 Bredebro		
Visby Præstegård		Trøjborgvej 1, 6261 Bredebro		
Åsgård		Skast 90, 6261 Bredebro		

=== 6270 Tønder ===
This list is incomplete

Listing name	Image	Location	Coordinates	Description
Allégade 24		Allegade 24, 6270 Tønder	54°46′8.12″N 8°51′58.64″E	
Amtmandsboligen		Jomfrustien 6, 6270 Tønder		
Amtsskriver Jürgensens Hus		Gråbrødrevej 2A, 6270 Tønder		

=== 6280 Højer ===
This list is incomplete

Listing name	Image	Location	Coordinates	Description
Emmerlev gamle Skole		Emmerlevvej 20, 6280 Højer		
Hjerpsted gamle Præstegård		Hjerpstedvej 22, 6280 Højer		
Hjerpsted gamle Præstegård		Hjerpstedvej 22, 6280 Højer		
Højer Mølle		Møllegade 13, 6280 Højer		
Højer Mølle		Møllegade 13, 6280 Højer		
Højer Mølle		Møllegade 13, 6280 Højer		
Højer Præstegård		Torvet 1, 6280 Højer		
Højkro		Højervej 3, 6280 Højer		
Højkro		Højervej 3, 6280 Højer		
Høybergvej 16		Høybergvej 16, 6261 Bredebro		
Kiersgård		Søndergade 12, 6280 Højer		
Kiersgård		Søndergade 12, 6280 Højer		
Købmandsgården		Nørrevej 1, 6280 Højer		
Købmandsgården		Nørrevej 1, 6280 Højer		

=== 6534 Agerskov ===
Listing name	Image	Location	Coordinates	Description
Agerskov Præstegård		Præstegårdsvej 20, 6534 Agerskov		
Agerskov Præstegård		Præstegårdsvej 20, 6534 Agerskov		

=== 6792 Rømø ===
Listing name	Image	Location	Coordinates	Description
Bornholmervej 12		Bornholmervej 12, 6792 Rømø	54°46′34.42″N 8°52′17.34″E	
Den gamle Redningsstation		Havnebyvej 156, 6792 Rømø		
Grammarkvej 13		Grammarkvej 13, 6792 Rømø		
Hattesvej 22		Hattesvej 22, 6792 Rømø		
Havnebyvej 196		Havnebyvej 196, 6792 Rømø		
Kommandørgården		Juvrevej 60, 6792 Rømø		
Kongsmark Skole		Gl Skolevej 6, 6792 Rømø		
Stagebjergvej 30		Stagebjergvej 30, 6792 Rømø		
Toftum Skole		Juvrevej 56, 6792 Rømø		
Toghale 13		Toghale 13, 6270 Tønder		
Vråbyvej 24		Vråbyvej 24, 6792 Rømø		
Østerhedevej 5		Østerhedevej 5, 6792 Rømø		
Østerhedevej 8		Østerhedevej 8, 6792 Rømø		
