= Tønder case =

Criminal case concerning child sexual abuse in Denmark

Tønder case or Tønder-case (Danish: Tønder-sagen) is a criminal case concerning child sexual abuse in Denmark. The father loaned and rented out his two daughters to a number of different men, who sexually assaulted the girls, who were born in 1994 and 1997 respectively. The case was acted on, on 4 August 2005, when police in Sønderborg received an anonymous tip that later resulted in an investigation on the matter.

Once investigated, the parents were arrested and the girls placed in foster care. While the abuse was happening, the local government received at least 14 different notices about suspicion of child neglect, and the local child authorities held meetings on the matter upwards of 30 times - without doing anything about the matter.

The Minister of Social Affairs at the time, Eva Kjer Hansen, refused for four months after the reveal of the case in 2005 to criticize Løgumkloster Municipality due to "there not being enough evidence to criticize their treatment of the case". Tønder Municipality was, however, criticized by the minister, and a key person in the municipality was fired as a result of the case. The family was living in Tønder Municipality at the start of the investigation, despite the abuse having started while they still lived in Løgumkloster Municipality.

Since the arrest of the family, 14 additional arrests have been made. Including the father, 15 men were sentenced to a total of 45 years of prison for abusing the elder daughter. It was later revealed that the father had been abusing both the younger and older daughter. The father was sentenced on charges of incest, sexual relations with minors and indecent exposure, which in February 2007 resulted in a prison sentence of 10 years. The father was also fined 200.000 DKK and 50.000 DKK in damages to the older and younger daughter respectively. The mother was, due to her being diagnosed with Schizophrenia, sentenced to indefinite involuntary commitment for being an accomplice to the father's incest.

After the sentences, a signature collection started to petition the Folketing to enact harsher punishment for the abuse of children. The collection was started by mechanic Peter Petersen, a citizen from Sønderjylland, and resulted in a total of 30.000 signatures, which were delivered to then Minister of Justice, Lene Espersen. Espersen commented, that she interpreted the aggressive requests, that were stated in the petition, as an expression of displeasure aimed towards the fact that sentences in paedophilia cases didn't didn't reach the harsher end of the spectrum.

The two girls received a total of 1.215.000 DKK in damages, with the older one receiving 880.000 DKK and the younger 320.000 DKK. On the 6. March 2014, Tønder Municipality elected to grant the older girl an additional 300.000 DKK as an apology. In February of the same year, Tønder Municipality was sued on behalf of the older daughter, by her lawyer, Nikolaj Nielsen. The aim of this suit was to get the municipality to further admit their guilt in failing to live up to their responsibility in regards to the case. The municipality reacted by handing over the suit to their insurance company, who promptly made additional replacement money available through the municipality's insurance.

The case has been described in numerous newspaper articles, books and documentaries, as well as the drama film Himlen Falder from 2009, which was directly inspired by the case.

== Summary of the case ==
A total of 16 arrests were made, including the girls' parents. The sexual abuse started in Løgumkloster Municipality, but when the family moved to Tønder, the charges were handed over to Tønder Municipality, who failed to take action in time, allowing the abuse to continue unhindered.

=== Brief timeline of the case ===
- 4. August 2005: The police in Sønderborg receive an anonymous tip, resulting in an investigation being started.
- 24. August 2005: The parents are arrested, and both girls are placed in foster care with a surrogate family.
- 11. January 2006: A 40-year-old man was arrested as the eleventh man in the case.

=== The Parents ===
The father (who was on disability pension due to a heart failure) was put on trial for having loaned and rented out the girls to a large number of unrelated men, who had then sexually assaulted the girls. The father had also sexually assaulted the girls himself. The father attempted suicide in December 2006 during his remand in Vejle Jail. While the sexual assaults and forced prostitution was happening, the father was a member of Satanisk Forening, a Danish satanist cult.

The mother (an organist in a local church) was put on trial for being an accomplice to, as well as attempting to participate in the copulation with the girls. In regards to the younger daughter, the mother received the same charges in a separate trial, where she had also been an accomplice to the assaults. The mother spoke in an interview to TV 2's criminal magazine Station 2, where she proclaimed herself as an innocent victim.

=== The Authorities ===
It was revealed that the family had been investigated by the local authorities in 2004, while they were still living in Løgumkloster Municipality, due to the mother's mental illness. The girls were, because of this investigation, offered a relief family (a family they could stay with when the mother's illness got particularly bad) and were nominated for regular psychiatric evaluation at Helsehjemmet Treatment Institute in Haderslev. The family moved to Tønder because of this.

Shortly after this nomination, the mother left the family. While she was missing, the girls were finally (half a year later) taken to the Treatment Institute for evaluation, on orders of the local municipality. The results of the evaluation were unclear, and resulted in no further action from the municipality. This later resulted in critique of the involved government institutes, who were accused of insufficient communication amongst themselves about the families situation and lacking treatment. On the 5. March 2014, Tønder Municipality paid 300.000 DKK in damages to the elder daughter after a lawsuit because of the aforementioned neglect. The Director of Children, School and Culture in Tønder Municipality stated that the municipality paid willingly to avoid an actual lawsuit.

== The Trials ==
The 47-year-old father in the Tønder Case was on the 20. February 2007 in the local court in Tønder, sentenced to 10 years in jail for the sexual abuse of his two daughters. He was sentenced after having confirmed his admission of guilt in regards to the sexual assault accusations. He only partially admitted having rented out the daughters to various other men (many of whom had already been sentenced at this point). He was, along with the prison sentence, forced to pay 200.000 DKK in damages to the older daughter, and 50.000 DKK to the younger one.

The 47-year-old man's was charged with having sexually abused his older daughter, as well as having rented her out to other men for various sexual acts, while she was still only 10–11 years old. In a later court session in Tønder, the father also admitted to the other 19 accusations (in regards to the other men), and after the prosecution and defence rested their case, it only took Judge Henriette Frölich half an hour to hand out the ruling.

The mother was sentenced separately on the 11. December 2006 in the same court (in Tønder) and was sentenced to indefinite involuntary commitment at a psychiatric hospital. It was revealed that she had had schizophrenia since 1983.

=== Other sentences related to the case ===
- 58-year-old man from Flensburg with Turkish background. Accused of two instances of copulation. Sentenced to three years in jail, as well as deportation from Denmark.
- 35-year old Abdul Jalil Ahadi from Aabenraa - an Afghan citizen and disabled pensionist. Accused of one instance of copulation. Sentenced to two years in jail and deportation from Denmark.
- 23-year old Said Mohammad Zakria Hosseini from Aabenraa - an Afghan citizen. Accused of one instance of copulation. Sentenced to two years in jail and deportation from Denmark.
- 37-year old Turkish man, and pizzeria owner from Esbjerg. Accused of two instances of copulation. Sentenced to three years in jail.
- 38-year old Sri Lankan man, and pizzeria owner from Aabenraa, as well as a Sri Lankan citizen. Accused of two instances of copulation. Sentenced to three years and three months in jail, as well as deportation from Denmark.
- 18-year old Sri Lankan citizen, and student from Haderslev. Accused of sexual assault, not-including copulation. Sentenced to one year in jail.
- 65-year old Mogens Bank, a pensioner from Højer. Accused of sexual abuse of the older daughter. Sentenced to two years and nine months in jail.
- 45-year old Bjarne Søndergaard Nielsen, a blacksmith from Stenderup-Krogager. Accused of copulation. Sentenced to two years in jail.
- 49-year old Verner Erling Staal, a carpenter from Gørding. Accused of one instance of copulation. Sentenced to two years in jail.
- 35-year old Sri Lankan pizzeria worker from Haderslev, born in Sri Lanka. Accused of one instance of copulation. Sentenced to two years in jail.
- 54-year old Ove Pedersen, a farmer from Branderup. Accused of one instance of copulation. Sentenced to two years in jail.
- 61-year old Kjeld Erling Nielsen, an accountant from Bramming. Accused of sexual assault, not-including copulation. Sentenced to one year and nine months in jail.
- 74-year old Gerhard Trip, pensioner from Abild. Found guilty of five instances of sexual assault, not-including copulation. Sentenced to two years and three months in jail.
- 45-year old Parameswaran Sinnathambi, a Sri Lankan man from Aabenraa. Found guilty of five instances of copulation, as well as being an accomplice to seven other instances of copulation including other men than himself, all related to the older daughter. Sentenced to six years in jail.

== Bibliography ==
=== Books ===
- 2007 - Grænselandet: Tøndersagen efterforsket - Mads Brügger (Translated: The Border Region: The Tønder Case investigated)
- 2007 - The Tønder Case - Claus Jessen

Claus Jessen, a journalist from Ekstra Bladet, had been covering the case since it was first revealed to the public. He released his book on the 28. March 2007, via his tabloids publishing firm, Ekstra Bladets Forlag. The book was a best-seller in Denmark.

During fall of the same year, Mads Brügger and Nikolaj Thomassen released their book on the subject.

=== Movies ===
- When Heaven Falls (Danish: Himlen falder), a Danish drama movie from 2009, produced by Manyar Parwani, was inspired by the Tønder case. It screened at the Zlin Film Festival.
