= 1920 Schleswig plebiscites =

Votes on the Denmark–Germany border

The Schleswig plebiscites were two plebiscites, organized according to section XII, articles 109 to 114 of the Treaty of Versailles of 28 June 1919, in order to determine the future border between Denmark and Germany through the former Duchy of Schleswig. The process was monitored by the Commission internationale de surveillance du plébiscite au Slesvig, with representatives from France, the United Kingdom, Norway and Sweden.

The plebiscites were held on 10 February and 14 March 1920, and the result was that the larger northern portion (Zone I) voted to join Denmark, which occurred 15 June 1920, while the smaller southern portion (Zone II) voted to remain part of Germany.

Order in the plebiscite area was ensured by a joint British-French mission, whose work was awarded the official award of Denmark - "Schleswig Commemorative Medal 1920" — "Schleswig Memorial Medal 1920" (other spellings of the name are "Schleswig Plebiscite Medal 1920" and "Den Slesvigske Eringdringsmedaille af 1920").

== Background ==
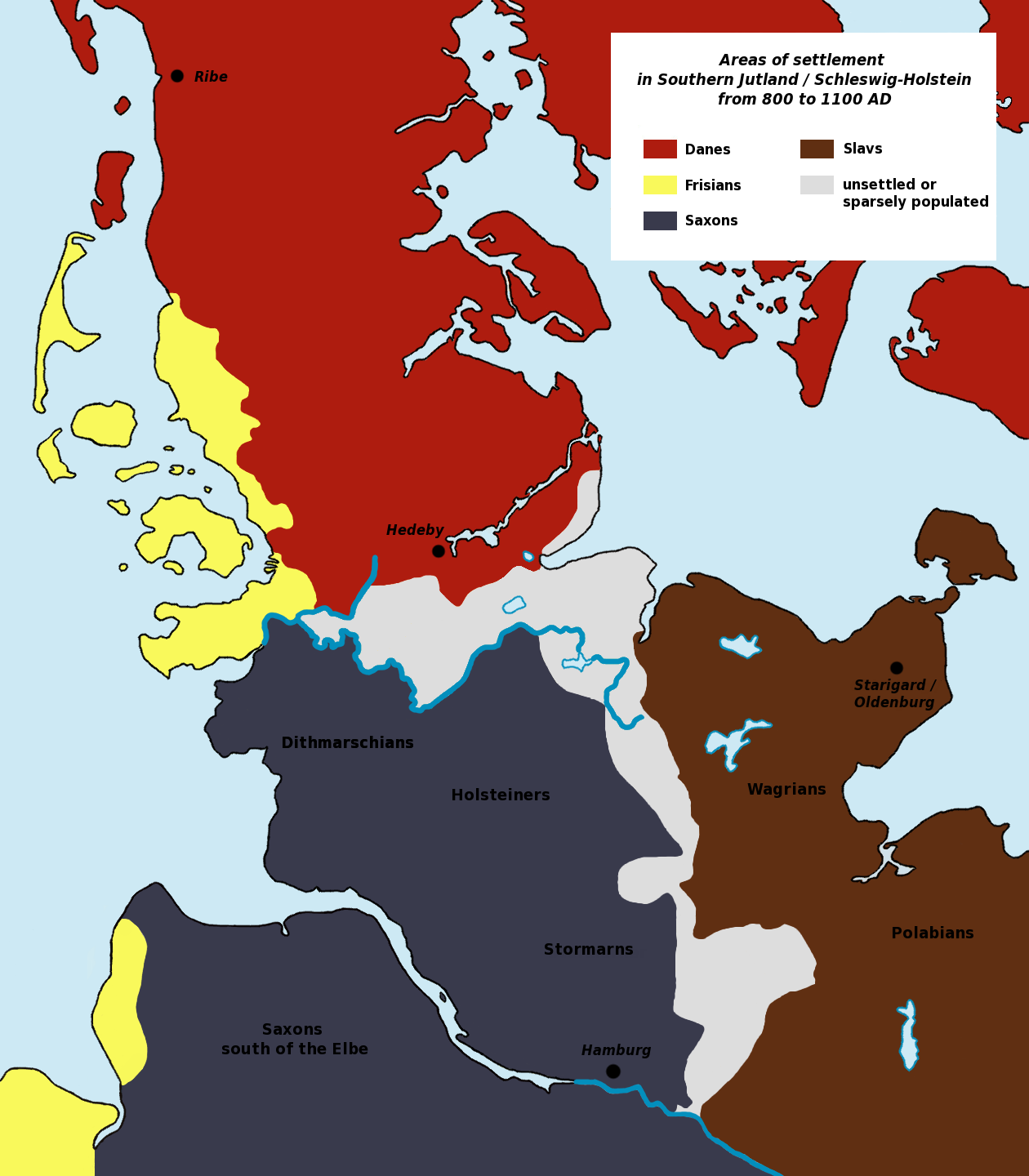
Areas of historic settlements

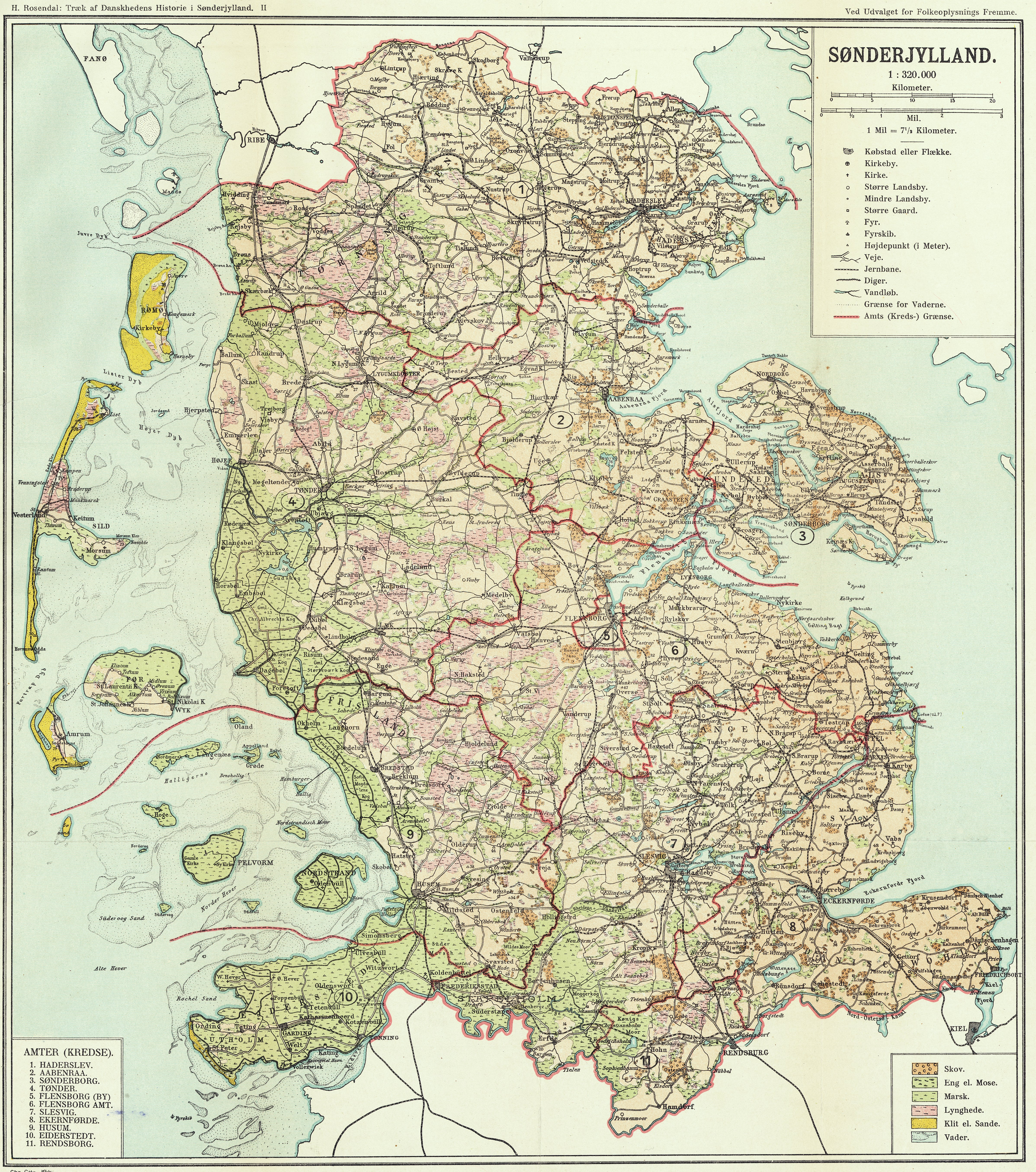
Map of Schleswig / South Jutland before the plebiscites.

The Duchy of Schleswig had been a fiefdom of the Danish crown since the Middle Ages, but it, along with the Danish-ruled German provinces of Holstein and Lauenburg, which had both been part of the Holy Roman Empire, was conquered by Prussia and Austria in the 1864 Second War of Schleswig. Between 1864 and 1866, Prussia and Austria ruled the entire region as a condominium, and they formalised this arrangement in the 1865 Gastein Convention. The condominium was terminated due to the Austro-Prussian War in 1866.

Article 5 of the Austro-Prussian Peace of Prague (1866) stipulated that a plebiscite should be held within the ensuing six years in order to give the people of the northern part of Schleswig the possibility of voting for the region's future allegiance by allowing regions voting for Danish rule to be restored to Danish administration.

The idea of a plebiscite had been presented earlier. During the early phases of the First Schleswig War, the secessionist government of Schleswig-Holstein had unsuccessfully suggested a plebiscite in parts of Schleswig, but this had been rejected by the Danish government, and during the 1863 London Conference's attempts to defuse the Second Schleswig War, one of the suggestions of Prussian Prime Minister Otto von Bismarck was a plebiscite in North Schleswig. Bismarck's initiative was not adopted by the conference, primarily since the option had not been included in the instruction to the Danish delegation. The inclusion of the promise of a plebiscite in the 1866 Austro-Prussian Peace of Prague was a diplomatic concession to Austria, but was not implemented. The reference to it was subsequently dropped in 1877 by Austria and Germany. The 1864 border was confirmed in the 1907 German-Danish Optant Treaty, but Danish North Schleswigers continued to argue for a plebiscite citing the 1866 Peace of Prague.

Danes campaigning for implementation of the plebiscite promise, in the hope that it would result in the area being restored to Danish rule, often made a comparison with the French demand for return of Alsace-Lorraine. This comparison was regarded sympathetically by French public opinion and, although Denmark had not taken part in the First World War, there was considerable backing in France for taking up the Danish claims as part of the post-war settlement.

After Germany's defeat in 1918, the Danish government asked the Allied Powers and the Versailles Conference of 1919 to include a plebiscite in the disputed North Schleswig region based on Woodrow Wilson's Fourteen Points as part of the Allied Powers' peace settlement with Germany, and this request was granted by the Allies.

== Defining the plebiscite boundaries ==
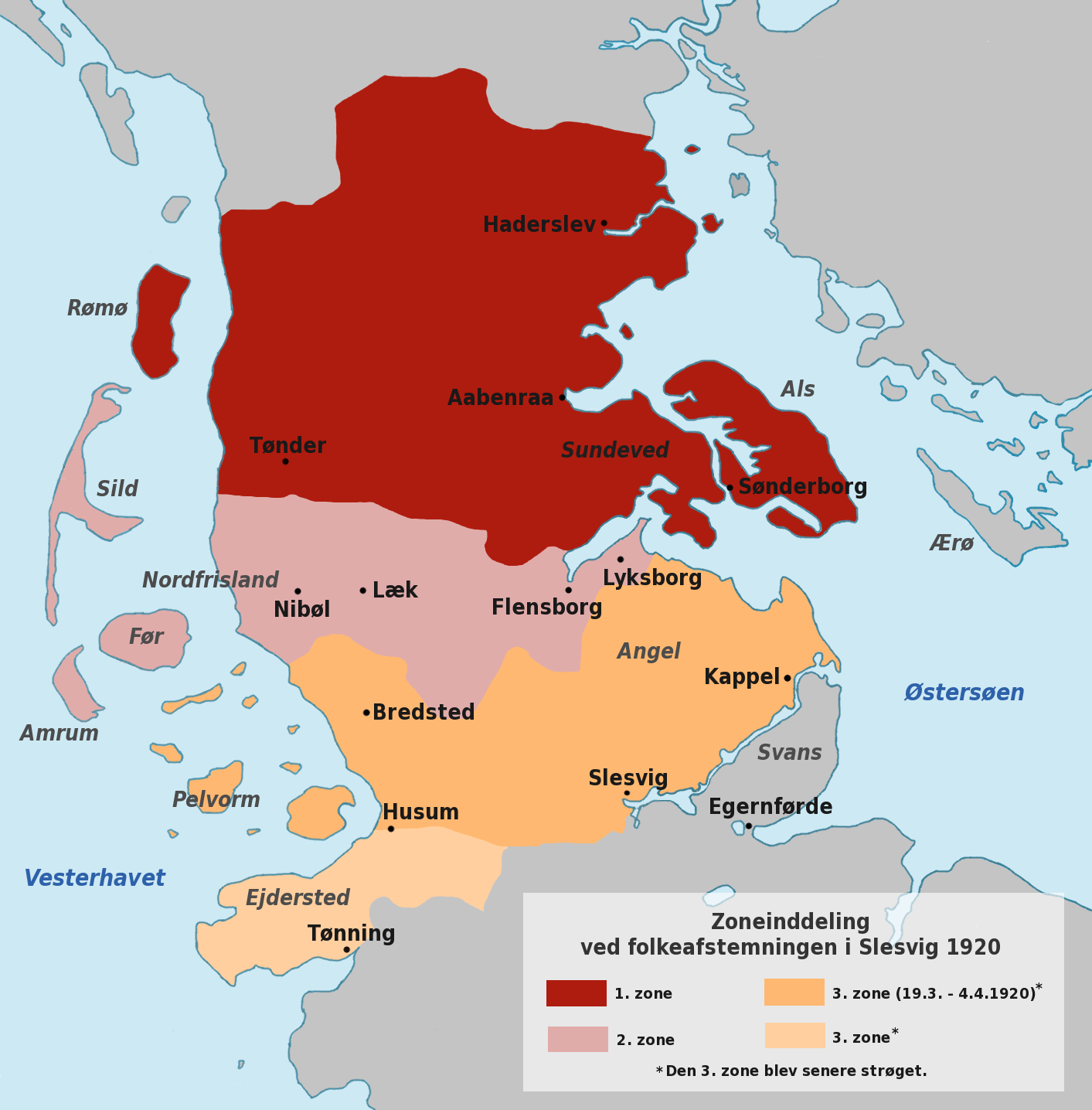
The three zones in Schleswig/Slesvig

The plebiscites were held on 10 February and 14 March 1920 in two zones that had been defined according to the wishes of the Danish government, and based on lines drawn in the 1890s by Danish historian Hans Victor Clausen. During the 1880s and 1890s, Clausen had travelled extensively on both sides of a possible future Dano-German border, for which he published two suggestions. Clausen's first line delineated a coherent territory that he expected would vote Danish in a future plebiscite, and the second line (about 10–20 km or 6–12 miles further south) included a thinly-populated rural region in Central Schleswig, which Clausen believed had potential for assimilation into Denmark, as the population of Central Schleswig was pro-German in allegiance, but also Danish-speaking.

In 1918, Clausen published a pamphlet "Før Afgørelsen" (Before the Decision) in which he strongly advocated that Denmark annex the zone delineated by his northernmost ("first") line, arguing that the territory north of this line was indisputably pro-Danish and should be considered indivisible. At the same time, he effectively abandoned his second line, as the population of Central Schleswig remained pro-German, and as he considered it vital that the future border should be based on the self-determination of the local populace. In the 1920 plebiscites, Clausen's first line was closely imitated in what became the plebiscite's Zone I, while his second line became the basis of Zone II, although the plebiscite zone was extended to include the city of Flensburg and the town of Glücksburg. Clausen had excluded both from his two lines.

Zone I was based on Clausen's estimations of the local population's national self-identification. When in doubt, Clausen primarily relied on the wishes of the rural communities, which he considered autochtone (indigenous), in contrast with the North Schleswig towns, which he considered largely irrelevant due to their smallness and their less-autochtone population, notably the demographics of the town of Sønderborg (Sonderburg) which had become strongly influenced by the presence of a large German naval base. In addition, Clausen believed that it would minimize the risk of future conflict if the future border in the marshy West Schleswig followed either the Vidå river or a dyke. This caused resentment on the German side, as this implied that the town of Tønder (Tondern) would be included in Zone I.

== Plebiscite preparations ==
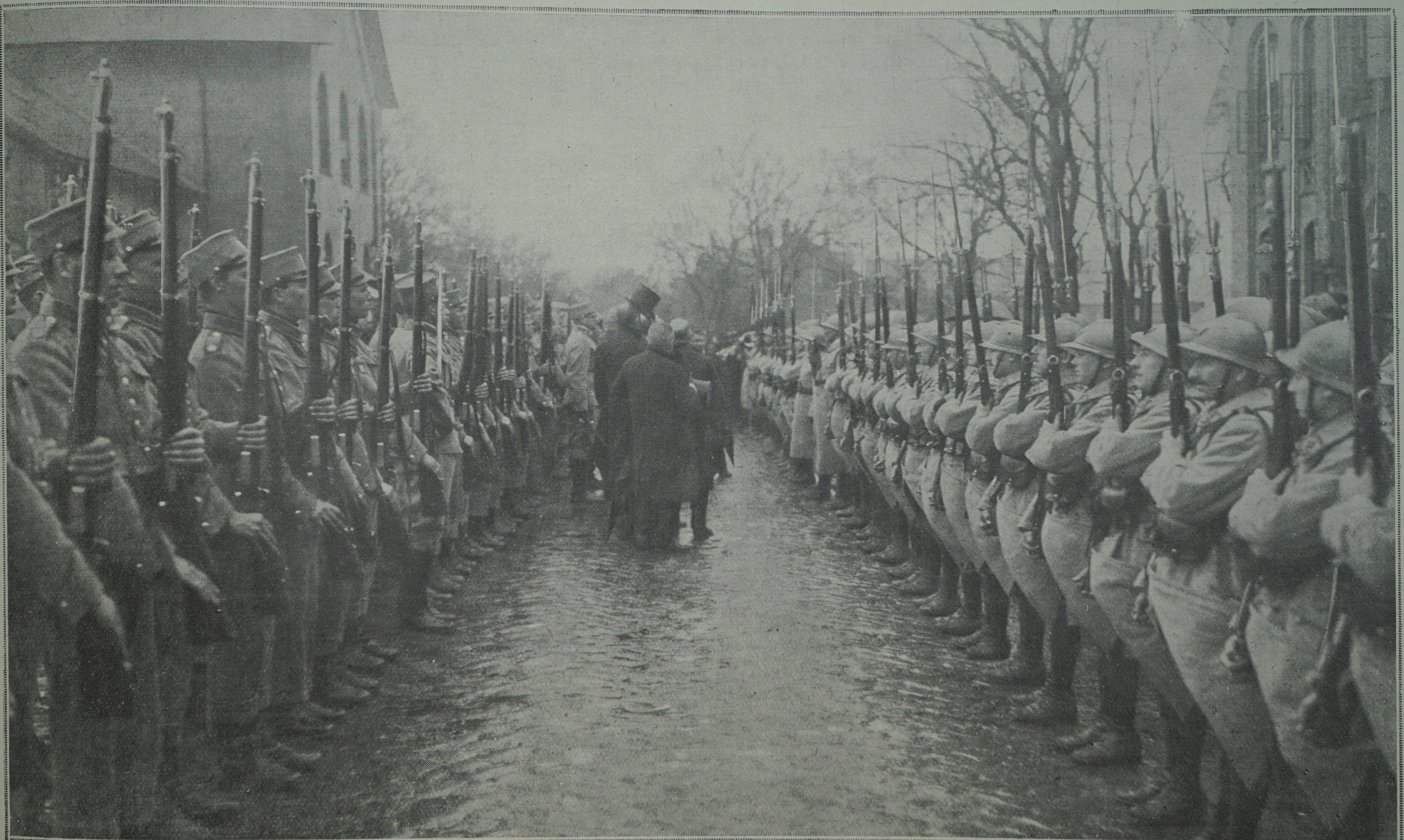
French troops stationed as a security force

In 1918 and early 1919, the leading Danish political parties argued that the future allegiance of North Schleswig should be decided by a plebiscite, in which the entire region should be counted as one indivisible unit, i.e. vote en bloc. This wish was conveyed to the Paris Peace Conference in Versailles, and became the basis for the plebiscite's Zone I.

During 1919, political wishes in Denmark grew for the extension of the plebiscite area, and the issue became a topic of confrontation between the Social Liberal government and its parliamentary support, the Social Democrats, both parties opposing an extension of the area, versus the Liberal and Conservative opposition which both supported an extension of the plebiscite area. As a compromise, it was decided to request the Allied Powers to extend the plebiscite until Clausen's second line, which was adapted to include Flensburg and Glücksburg. In this smaller Zone II, each town – or, in the rural areas, each parish – was to decide its own allegiance. Two other requests were made, which were only partially followed by the Allied Powers. Firstly, Denmark requested that the plebiscite area's German civil administration be replaced by an international administration. The Allied Powers replaced the German garrisons with a small international force, of 400 French soldiers disembarked from the cruiser La Marseillaise, but the civil administration was only partially replaced in Zone I, and not at all in Zone II. Secondly, Denmark had requested that persons previously expelled from the region should be allowed to vote in the plebiscite. This was intended to allow previously expelled "optants" to vote, i.e. the families of locals who had opted to retain their Danish citizenship and who had consequently been expelled from the area by Prussian authorities. The Allied Powers granted this request but extended it, consequently entitling anyone who had previously lived in the region to vote in the plebiscite. Since a large number of German officials (notably railway officials) had been temporarily stationed in the area, this extension implied that these officials as well as their wives and any children of legal age were entitled to vote in the plebiscite. Since many of the expelled pro-Danish "optants" had emigrated to the United States, the net result of this extension was a slight increase for the German results, and it was much more likely for a pro-German emigrant living in Germany to return to the region for the plebiscite than for a pro-Danish expellee who had emigrated to the United States to do the same.

== Plebiscite voting and results ==
On 10 February 1920 the plebiscite was held in Zone I, the later Northern Schleswig, where 74.9% (75,431 votes) voted to become Danish, while 25.1% (25,329 votes) voted to stay German. In three of the four major towns, especially in the southern region directly at the border with Zone II, German majorities existed, with a German majority as large as 70 to 80 percent in and around Tønder (plus southerly Udbjerg) and Højer. It was mostly this area that caused controversy after the voting, especially as these towns had been included north of Clausen's first line. Although Clausen correctly estimated Tønder to be vastly pro-German, he considered the town to be economically dependent on its pro-Danish rural uplands, and placed both the town and its uplands north of his first line.

Local majorities for Germany also existed elsewhere: In the small town of Tinglev, in the city of Sønderborg, site of a substantial German navy base, and the city of Aabenraa. Like Tønder and Højer, Tinglev directly bordered Zone II. Both the latter cities, however, lay "isolated" in pro-Danish surroundings.

The vote in Central Schleswig (Zone II) took place on 14 March 1920, where 80.2% (51,742 votes) voted to stay German, while 19.8% (12,800) voted to become Danish. Since a Danish majority in this zone was produced in only three small villages on the island of Föhr, none of which were near the coming border, the Commission Internationale de Surveillance du Plébiscite au Slesvig (CIS) decided on a line almost identical to the border between the two zones. The poor result for Denmark in Central Schleswig, particularly in Flensburg, Schleswig's largest city, triggered Denmark's 1920 Easter Crisis.

A plebiscite was not held in the southernmost third of the province (Zone III which included the region south of Zone II until the Schlei, Danevirke, and the city of Schleswig) as the population was almost exclusively pro-German. The Allied Powers had offered to include this region in the plebiscite, but the Danish government had expressly asked for Zone III to be excluded. The small part of the historical province located south of Zone III was not included in plebiscite plans among the Allied Powers, and the same applied in Denmark, since the extreme south of the former duchy was considered to be a completely pro-German area.

Selected results in detail:

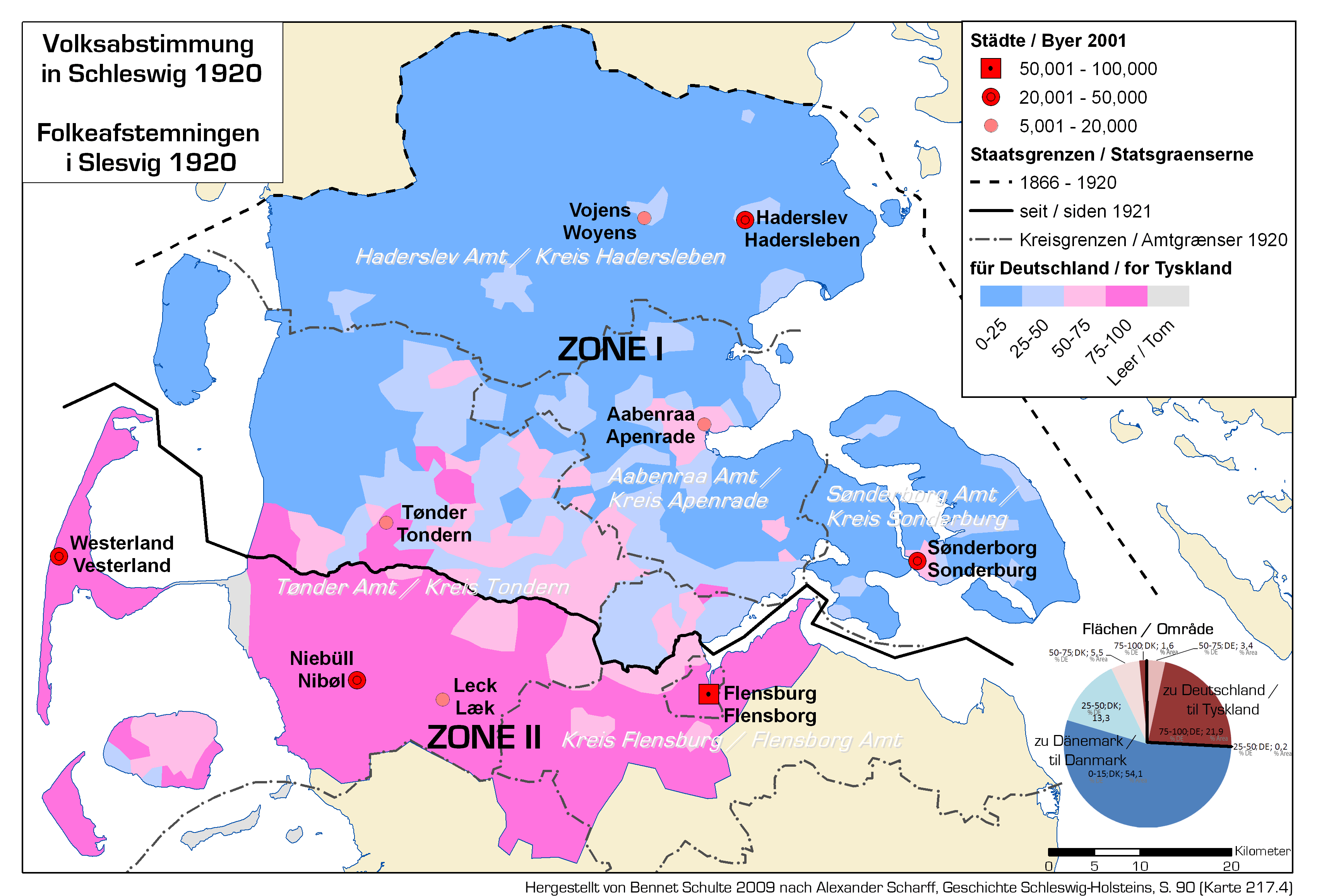
Heat map of plebiscite results in Schleswig, with bluer shades indicating Denmark and pinker shades indicating Germany.

Plebiscite results in Zone I, by parish (figures correspond to % vote for Denmark). Based on the official map from Denmark's Ministry of South Jutland Affairs.

Electorate	German name	Danish name	For Germany		For Denmark	
Electorate	German name	Danish name	percent	votes	percent	votes
Zone I (Northern Schleswig), 10 February 1920			25.1 %	25,329	74.9 %	75,431
District of	Hadersleben	Haderslev	16.0%	6,585	84.0%	34,653
Town of	Hadersleben	Haderslev	38.6%	3,275	61.4%	5,209
District of	Apenrade	Aabenraa	32.3%	6,030	67.7%	12,653
Town of	Apenrade	Aabenraa	55.1%	2,725	44.9%	2,224
District of	Sonderburg	Sønderborg	22.9%	5,083	77.1%	17,100
Town of	Sonderburg	Sønderborg	56.2%	2,601	43.8 %	2,029
Town of	Augustenburg	Augustenborg	48.0%	236	52.0%	256
Northern part of District of	Tondern	Tønder	40.9%	7,083	59.1%	10,223
Town of	Tondern	Tønder	76.5%	2,448	23.5%	750
Town of	Hoyer	Højer	72.6%	581	27.4%	219
Town of	Lügumkloster	Løgumkloster	48.8%	516	51.2%	542
Northern part of District of	Flensburg	Flensborg	40.6%	548	59.4%	802
Zone II (Central Schleswig), 14 March 1920			80.2 %	51,742	19.8 %	12,800
Southern part of District of	Tondern	Tønder	87.9%	17,283	12.1%	2,376
Southern part of District of	Flensburg	Flensborg	82.6%	6,688	17.4%	1,405
Town of	Flensburg	Flensborg	75.2%	27,081	24.8%	8,944
Northern part of District of	Husum	Husum	90.0%	672	10.0%	75

== Settlement of the Danish-German border ==
Directly after the announcement of the results from Zone I, an alternative draft for the frontier was made by the German administrator Johannes Tiedje. The proposed frontier would have incorporated Tønder/Tondern, Højer/Hoyer, Tinglev/Tingleff and neighbouring areas and also some parts north from Flensburg – the so-called Tiedje Belt – and would have created almost equal minorities on both sides of the frontier instead of 30,000 to 35,000 Germans in Denmark and 6,000 to 8,000 Danes in Germany.

Tiedje's Line was strongly criticised in Denmark, as it would have transferred a large number of pro-Danish communities south of the future border, and was refused by all parties in the Danish parliament. The plebiscite's entire Zone I was transferred to Denmark on 15 June 1920, and the territory was officially named the South Jutlandic districts, more commonly Southern Jutland, although the latter name is also the historiographical name for the entire Schleswig region.

== Gallery ==
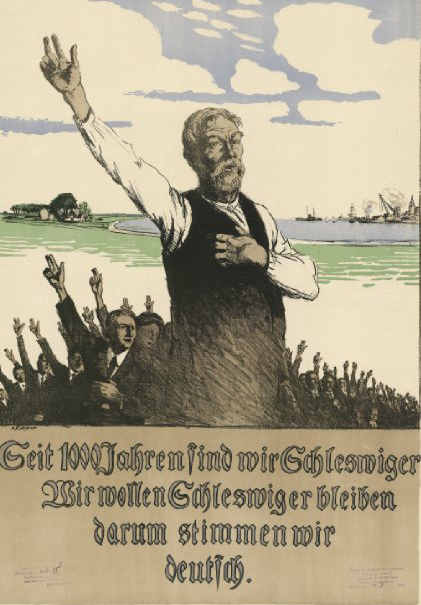
A pro-German campaign poster. "We have been Schleswigers for 1,000 years. We will remain Schleswigers. That's why we vote for Germany."

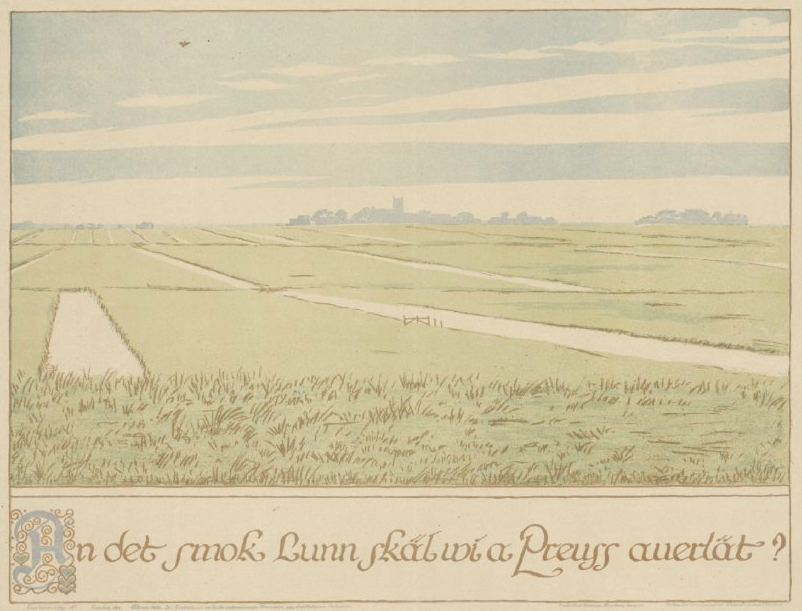
A pro-Danish campaign poster in North Frisian "Should we leave this land to the Prussian?"

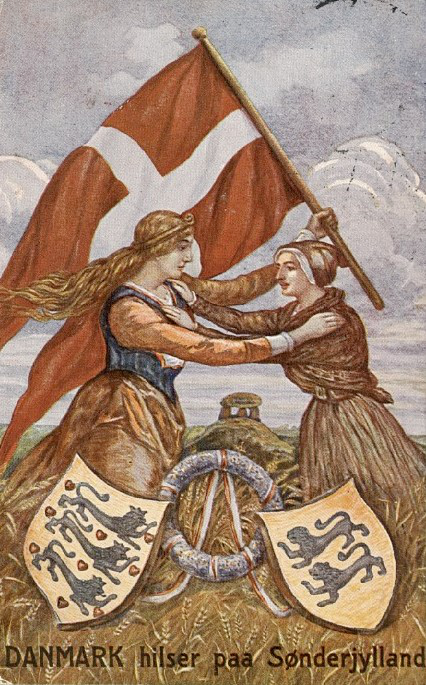
Pro-Danish post card. Mother Denmark greets South Jutland

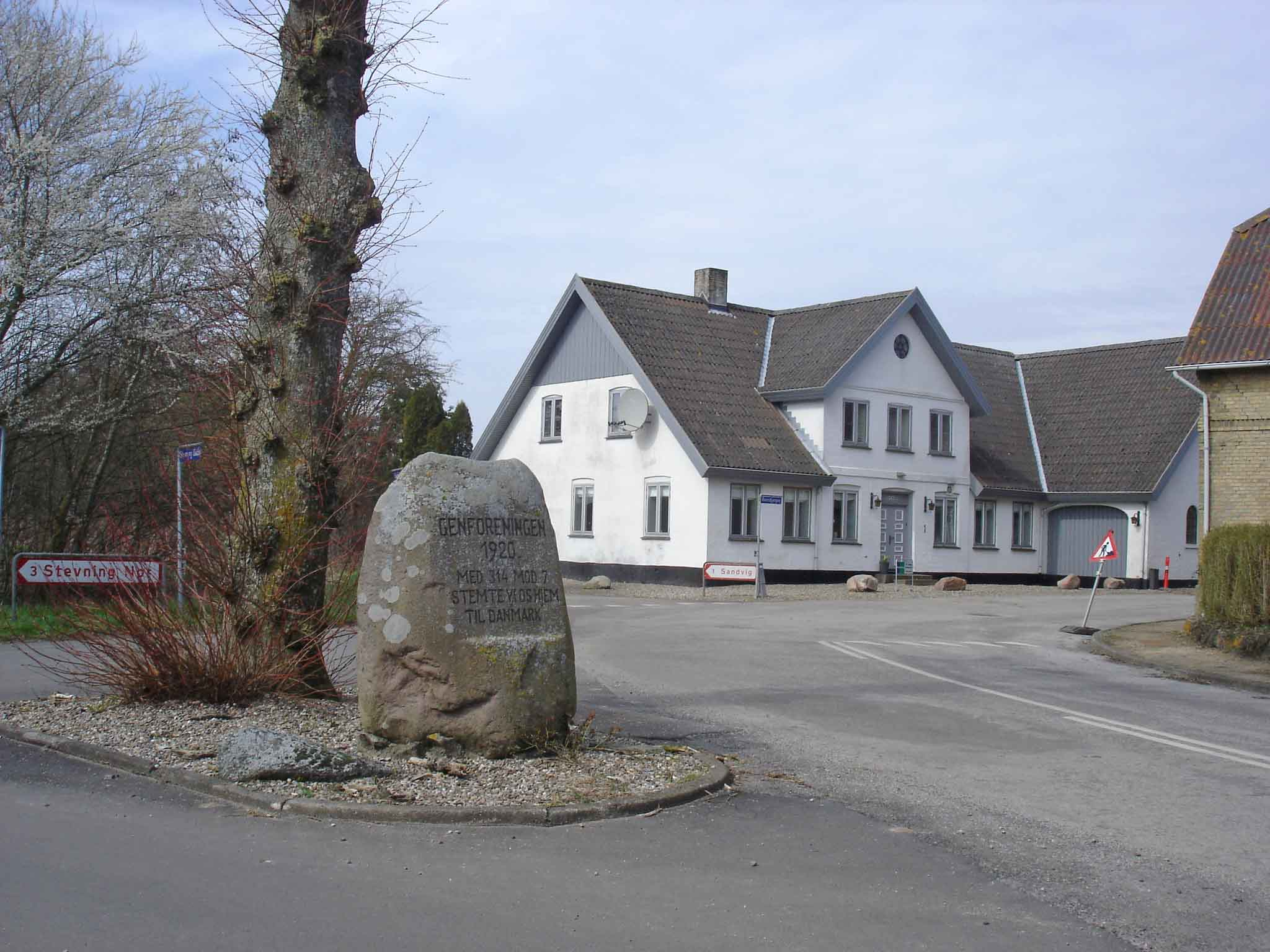
Memorial in Stevning. "Reunification 1920. By 314 to 7 we voted ourselves home to Denmark".

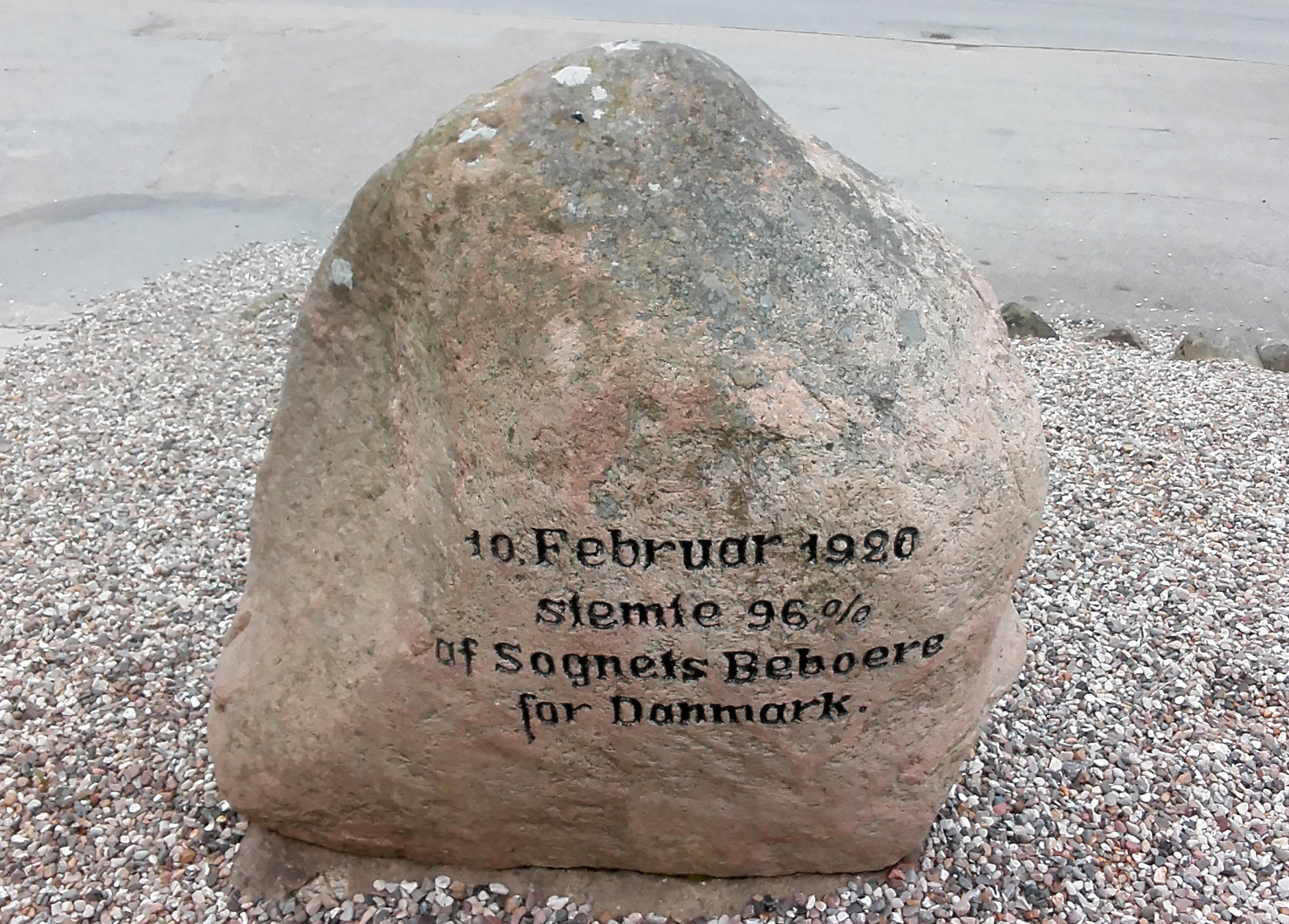
Memorial in Øster Lindet. "10 February 1920, 96% of the population of this parish voted for Denmark".

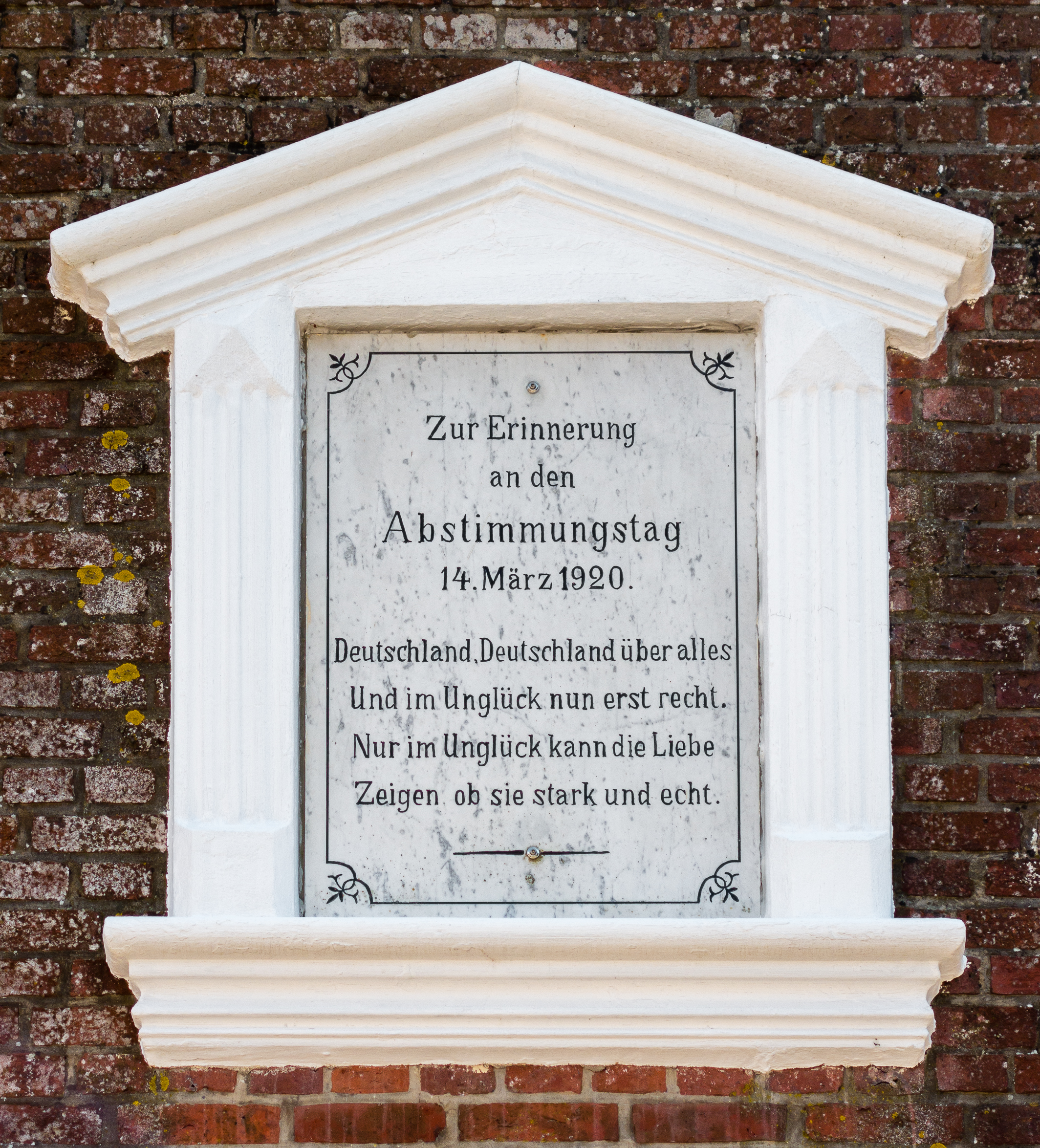
Memorial in Wyk, Föhr, Germany. A reinterpretation of the Deutschlandlied. "... Only in misfortune, will the love [of your country] show if it is strong and true."

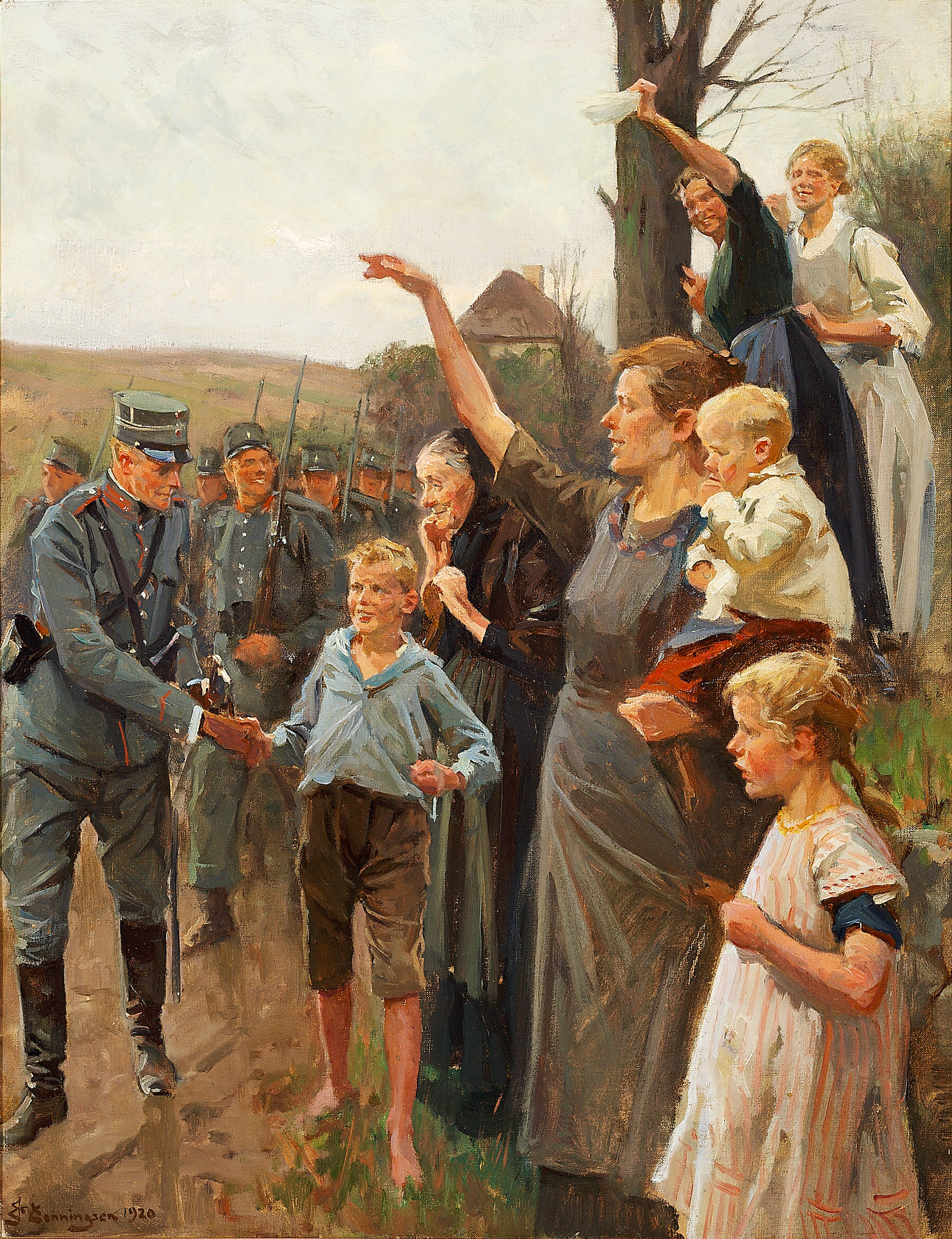
Painting of Danish soldiers returning to Northern part of Schleswig

== See also ==
- Easter Crisis
- Schleswig-Holstein question
- Danish minority of Southern Schleswig
- German minority in Denmark
- History of Schleswig-Holstein
- Southern Schleswig
- 1920 Danish constitutional referendum
