= Løgumkloster Municipality =

Former municipality in Denmark

Coordinates: 55°03′25″N 8°57′12″E

Løgumkloster Municipality named for the town Løgumkloster, existed until 1 January 2007, covering an area of 200 km^{2} and with a total population of 6,846 (2005). Its last mayor was Kaj Armann, a member of the Venstre (Liberal Party) political party. The municipality was created in 1970 as the result of a kommunalreform ("Municipality Reform") that combined a number of existing parishes:

- Bedsted Parish
- Højst Parish
- Løgumkloster Parish
- Nørre Løgum Parish.

Løgumkloster Municipality ceased to exist due to Kommunalreformen ("The Municipality Reform" of 2007). It was merged with Bredebro, Højer, Nørre-Rangstrup, Skærbæk, and Tønder municipalities to form an enlarged Tønder municipality. This created a municipality with an area of 1,352 km^{2} and a total population of 42,645 (2005).
