= Languages of Denmark =

- National: Danish
- Regional: Faroese; German; Greenlandic
- Signed: Danish Sign Language
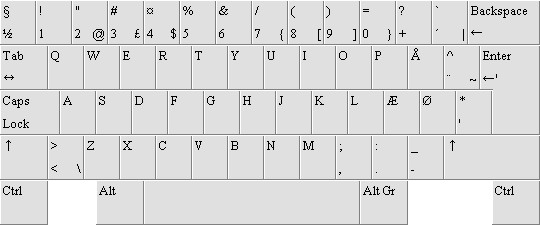
- Keyboard layout: Danish QWERTY

The Danish Realm has no official language as neither the Constitution or other laws designate Danish as such. There are, moreover, no official minority languages in the country. However, Danish is considered the language of Denmark proper, and it is used together with Faroese in the Faroe Islands. In Greenland, only Greenlandic is recognized as the official language, but public services are also required to be available in Danish. Denmark has furthermore ratified the European Charter for Regional or Minority Languages and recognizes the German language as a minority language in Southern Jutland for its German minority.

Danish is the first language of 92% of the population, while Arabic, English and German are each spoken as a first language by 1% of the population. English is spoken by 87% of the population overall, and German by 49%. Additionally, 14% of the population can converse in Swedish, and 11% in French.

== Recognized minority languages ==
=== German ===
German immigration to Denmark began in the 12th century as part of a northward migration from German-speaking regions. One of the earliest documented mentions of German immigrants is found in the writings of Saxo Grammaticus on German craftsmen in Roskilde around 1200. The 1286 murder of Eric V of Denmark, described in a poem by the German poet Rumelant, also reflects on the presence of Germans at the time. Immigration intensified with the rise of the Hanseatic League as coastal cities thrived and Copenhagen attracted Hanseatic merchants. German settlers integrated with locals, however place names like Tyskemannegade (now Vimmelskaftet) in Copenhagen indicate certain concentrated German communities. Motivations for German migration included economic opportunities, such as access to trade and employment. Even after the peak of Hanseatic influence, Denmark remained an attractive destination for German migrants seeking work or career advancement. Additionally, some migration was driven by factors like war or religious persecution.

Between roughly 1100 and 1500, the German immigrants primarily spoke Low German, which later shifted to High German from the 16th century onward. The migration persisted, though with varying intensity, well into the 19th century, when rising nationalist tensions between Danes and Germans contributed to growing cultural resistance toward the German language and identity. From the early 14th century, Low German appeared alongside Latin in Danish royal correspondence and the King maintained a German chancery, staffed by clerical scribes trained in monastery schools, handling communication with German princes, cities, and duchies. These scribes maintained distinct Danish and German texts, avoiding mixed forms.

The earliest Low German document written in Denmark, dates back to 12 November 1329. Major trading towns used German in administration due to extensive contact with Hanseatic cities. Guilds and crafts in these towns saw strong German influence from immigrant artisans. Name lists from guild records around 1400 include individuals identified as German immigrants by nicknames tied to places, trades, or traits. In Copenhagen, German residents lived in areas like Tyskemannegade and Hyskenstræde. As a legal language, Low German appeared in translations of Danish regional laws, such as Jyske Lov and Sjællandske Love, during the 14th and 15th centuries. These translations likely served German-speaking residents. By the mid-15th century, Low German was common in daily life, sharing roles with Danish and chanceries used both languages based on recipients. Moreover, guilds and crafts issued records in both. Laws were mostly Danish, but some translated for German speakers. Churches used both languages after the Reformation.

Around 1540, Low German and High German coexisted with Danish Christian III and Queen Dorothea speaking Low German, while her handwritten notes mix Low German with the emerging High German used by chancery scribes. By the mid-16th century, High German replaced Low German in chanceries, becoming the prestige language. It spread as a spoken language among elites and the educated, though Low German persisted. High German gained prestige through German congregations, attended by both German elites and many Danish families. The first, St. Peter's Church, began in Copenhagen in 1575 with an attached school. In 1618, another German-speaking congregation formed in Christianshavn, using the German Church.

By 1704, two more German-speaking congregations started at Garrison Church and Kastellet for mostly German-speaking soldiers. Services used High German, though members likely mixed High and Low German. These congregations grew rapidly, especially with refugees from the Thirty Years' War. By the late 17th century, religious minorities like Calvinists, Pietists, and Jews settled in free cities like Fredericia, using German as a common language. In 1689, Calvinists, supported by the Calvinist Queen Charlotte Amalie, formed a German-speaking congregation. In 1771, a Moravian congregation settled in Christiansfeld. Around 1700, about 20% of the population of Copenhagen spoke German.

==== Growing anti-German sentiments ====
In the 18th century, German immigration continued, with poor Palatinate farmers, known as Potato Germans recruited to cultivate heaths of Jutland. Influential German noble statesmen from the families of like Moltke, Reventlow, and Bernstorff served the absolute monarchy, launching projects in agriculture, forestry, and industry while supporting arts by inviting German experts and artists. Meanwhile, Enlightenment ideals fostered a self-confident Danish bourgeoisie, eager to claim high positions long held by German cosmopolitans who spoke German or French and often knew little Danish. These foreigners remained loyal to the Danish king despite language barriers. Danish intellectuals rallied to promote Danish language and history, reflecting growing national consciousness.

In the 18th century, the writings of Ludvig Holberg and Peter Andreas Heiberg fueled anti-German sentiment by depicting German courtiers as arrogant, Danish-ignorant parasites. Moreover, Johann Friedrich Struensee issues orders in German and had no knowledge of Danish which only intensified hostility. After his fall, Juliana Maria and Ove Høegh-Guldberg prioritized Danish, culminating in the 1776 nativity law, restricting offices to those born in the monarchy. This drove many German families to Schleswig-Holstein, reducing German influence. Danish replaced German in the military in 1773 and in most German congregations Danish replaced German except in Sankt Petri. German publications dwindled, though crafts retained German due to cross-border traditions. Efforts to suppress German in the duchies via language decrees occurred between 1807 and 1851 which heightened Danish-German tensions.

==== Ethnic German minority ====
Denmark became a linguistically uniform country after losing Schleswig-Holstein in 1864. The 1920 Schleswig reunification brought a German minority to Denmark, numbering between 15,000 and 20,000 people. This minority lived north of the new border, particularly in and around the towns of Tønder and Aabenraa. Between the two world wars, significant tensions arose between the German minority and the Danish majority population. These tensions increased as many in the minority supported Nazism. Following World War II, a severe legal process occurred as German institutions were shut down, and many individuals from the minority departed the region.

In 1955, Denmark and Germany established the Bonn-Copenhagen declarations, which outlined rights and principles to protect the minorities on both sides of the border from discrimination and ideological control. Approximately two-thirds of the German minority speak Danish or South Jutlandic at home but use German as their cultural language. Although Denmark ratified the European Charter for Regional or Minority Languages in 2000, which stipulates the right of the German minority to use their own forms of geographical names, no steps had been taken in this direction as of November 2008.

Outside the minority area German is used by members of St. Peter's parish in Copenhagen. 24 German kindergartens and 18 German schools are maintained by the German School and Language Association.

Interest in German language

Throughout the 20th century, especially after World War II, German lost ground to English, and German ceased to be a mandatory foreign language. Awareness of Germany, its culture, and its societal conditions has declined, with limited media encouragement due to underrepresentation of German-language TV channels compared to English-language ones. Negative attitudes toward Germany from earlier generations have also largely faded, yet motivation to learn the German language has as well.

== Minority languages ==
=== Dutch ===
In the 16th century, Christian II of Denmark invited Dutch farmers to Amager near Copenhagen and other parts of the country for agricultural and cultural reasons. These immigrants maintained their traditions for several centuries, until the 19th century when their Dutch dialect faded due to assimilation.

==== History ====
The earliest evidence of Dutch presence in Denmark dates from the late 14th century. Merchants traded in Dragør, naming Hollanderstræde, which appears in sources from the 15th century. The most significant Dutch immigration occurred in the 16th and 17th centuries. In 1521, Christian II invited 184 Dutch families to cultivate vegetables on Amager, granting them special privileges. Many settled in Hollænderby (Store Magleby) and these farmers maintained their culture over centuries, and their names and traditions persist today. A name list from the colonization period includes male first names like Adrian, Clas, Cornelis, Crilles, Dirck, Folker, Gert, Jan, Piet, Theis, Tonnes, Willem, Ziebrandt, and corresponding patronyms, as well as female names like Grit, Marchen, and Neel. Sources on the Dutch Amager language is limited due to the fire during the 1659 assault on Copenhagen which destroyed archives related to the Amager colony. Over centuries, the original Dutch language mixed with Low German, High German, and Danish due to surrounding influences. As Amager farmers became Lutherans, they could not recruit priests from the Netherlands and instead hired Low German-speaking Holsteiners. Consequently, school and church language gradually became Low German. Books for church and school, printed with special royal privilege in Low German between 1685 and 1788, reflect this shift. However, the colloquial language differed significantly from church and school language, as evident in surviving documents, inscriptions, and 18th-century travel accounts, which note that Dutch visitors found it difficult to understand. By the mid-17th century, the Amager colony had grown significantly. Selected residents received permission to establish Ny Hollænderby on Frederiksberg, but they abandoned it in 1699 after fires and crop failures. During the same period, Dutch-populated colonies emerged on small islands around Lolland-Falster and on Sprogø, but these left no lasting traces. In the 17th century, Christian IV recruited numerous Dutch specialists for construction projects. Many settled in Christianshavn, where fortifications followed designs by Dutch engineer Johan Sems. Notable Dutch artists, including painters Jacob van Doordt, Karel van Mander, and Abraham Wuchters and poet Joost van den Vondel, worked at the royal court during this time. Dutch expertise, furthermore, dominated maritime activities as shipbuilders and carpenters arrived in Denmark as experts, while Danish naval officers trained in the Netherlands. Dutch skills were highly valued, leading to exemptions from the requirement that immigrants adhere to Lutheranism. Dutch religious refugees settled early, contributing to fortifications at Glückstadt near the southern border. Dutch written language, often with Low German influences, saw limited use in chanceries. As a literary language, it appeared occasionally in laudatory poems tied to specific events, particularly during the Dano-Swedish War from 1658 to 1660, when the Dutch navy aided Denmark. Dutch immigrants in cities joined German congregations, since Low German was more common than High German as a colloquial language, communication between German and Dutch churchgoers posed no issues, notably in Copenhagen's Sankt Petri, Christianshavn's congregation, and Helsingør's Mariakirken. Dutch theater troupes traveled in Denmark during the 17th century, and comedies of Ludvig Holberg occasionally included Dutch lines. Danes likely perceived Dutch as a variant of the familiar Low German. Contemporary sources referred to Dutch people as hollændere, nedersaksere, nedertyskere, or simply tyskere, and their language as hollandsk, nedersaksisk, nedertysk, or tysk.

Throughout the 18th century, immigration from the Netherlands reached its peak, marking a significant period of Dutch cultural and demographic influence across various regions of Denmark. Following this era, additional families continued to settle in Denmark, and their descendants remain identifiable through distinctive surnames like Worm, van Deurs, Marselis, de Coninck, Fabritius, and Tengnagel, which reflect a deep connection to Dutch heritage and persist widely in certain communities. A notable example of later collective immigration involves the guild of kettle-menders in Horsens, composed of Catholic immigrants hailing from Luyksgestel, who notably preserved their guild statutes in the Dutch language until at least 1806, demonstrating a continuity of their linguistic traditions in official records. The distinctive language spoken by the Amager farmers, a unique blend incorporating elements of Dutch, Low German, High German, and Danish, gradually faded from use during the 19th century, primarily due to assimilation into the dominant Danish linguistic environment surrounding these communities. Despite this linguistic shift, awareness of Dutch cultural heritage remains robust among descendants, who actively maintain a sense of pride in their historical roots through various enduring practices. Children in these communities frequently receive traditional Dutch first names, ensuring the continuation of cultural identity, while the surnames established during the original colonization period remain prevalent, serving as a lasting testament to their ancestral legacy.

=== Frisian ===
North Frisian was historically spoken in several polder villages close to the German border and in the town of Tønder. By the 17th century, however, its use had largely receded to the region between the Danish-German border and Højer. As late as the 1930s, Frisian-speaking families could still be found around Tønder, including in Møgeltønder. However, after World War II, Frisian was spoken by only a few elderly individuals in the area.

Although between 2,000 and 5,000 Frisians were estimated to live in Denmark in 2022, only a few continue to speak the language.

==== Frisian influence ====
The local Danish dialects spoken in Højer and Tønder show influences from Frisian. Frisian loanwords in Danish include låning, a term from North Frisian dialects meaning a dike (or embankment), documented in West South Jutland, particularly on Rømø, Mandø and Højer where it evolved to mean long, stiff rye straw used for thatching, bedding, beer brewing filters, and sand drift control. Other Frisian words that have entered the Danish language include bavn, gest, hallig, kæltring, mase, mask, koog, pæl, stræde, and tjalk.

=== Polish ===
Polish emerged in Denmark through seasonal agricultural workers who settled on Lolland-Falster and South Zealand between 1893 and 1929, establishing communities where Polish was spoken. Polish influence contributed loanwords to Danish, including kontusz, a term for a loose outer garment documented in historical records and art from the 17th and 18th centuries. Additional terms like vildskur, from Polish wilczur or wilk and skóra meaning wolf skin, and possibly kavaj from Polish kabat via Low German, entered Danish vocabulary.

Polish use in Denmark expanded after World War I when settled Polish immigrants, prominent in Catholic congregations, accessed Polish masses and confessions through priests with Polish proficiency, such as Heinrich Deutscher, who served Polish-speaking communities from 1910 to 1957. After World War II, St. Anne's Church in Copenhagen became a hub for Polish immigrants, with the Polish Catholic Mission, founded in 1950, offering Polish catechism classes and community activities like language instruction. Recent Polish immigration has increased Polish masses to weekly services and prompted the appointment of Polish priests across Denmark to support the language in religious and cultural settings.

Polish language education began in Denmark during the late 1920s through schools established by Polish associations in areas with large Polish immigrant populations, including Nakskov, Maribo, Nykøbing Falster, Copenhagen, Nivå, and Haderslev. Before World War II, Polish instruction occurred at twelve locations, often as courses rather than formal schools, teaching reading, writing, history, geography, traditions, and songs for grades one to seven. The Polish Ministry of Religious Affairs and Public Education sent teachers and funded salaries through its embassy, while Polish associations provided classrooms and teacher housing, with the school in Nakskov from 1933, serving the most students until 1943.

Following the entry of Poland into the European Union in 2004, increased Polish immigration strengthened the presence of the Polish language in Denmark, although many recent migrants later returned to Poland due to improved economic conditions in the country.

=== Romani ===
Romani languages in Denmark appear in sparse records, with only isolated words documented from the first migration wave of the 16th century. In 1824, philologist N. V. Dorph published a small dictionary recording the mixed language spoken by Romani migrants of the second wave during the 18th century. In the 20th century, Denmark experienced the third Romani migration wave of Vlax Romani-speakers but the language was not documented either. The fourth migration wave was of Romani refugees from the Kosovo War. While Romani languages have been the source for loanwords for languages which surround Danish, like English and Swedish, no Romani words have entered Danish directly, only through Rotvælsk.

Romani use in Denmark includes a brief experiment with mother-tongue instruction in Helsingør during the 1980s, though no sustained educational programs developed, unlike in Sweden and Finland. Selahetin Kruezi, a Danish Roma, published school books in Romani in 2003 and additional works on fables, the Romani language, and Roma origins between 2009 and 2017, while some Danish libraries hold limited Romani-language books. The few academic studies on Romani by Hans Hendriksen, Viggo Brøndal, and Peter Bakker, along with involvement of Aarhus University in international Romani research projects in the 2000s, highlight the modest presence of Romani.

==== Recognition ====
Romani has no recognition in Denmark. In 2007, the Council of Europe advised Denmark to recognize Romani as a minority language under the European Charter for Regional or Minority Languages. In 2011 Committee of Ministers of Council of Europe recommended that the Danish authorities clarify the issue of the traditional presence of the Romani language in country. The authorities responded that they have reviewed multiple sources and tried also to obtain information by contacting universities in Scandinavia, but did not find any documentation in support of the traditional presence of the Romani language in Denmark.

During the on-the-spot visit, the Committee of Experts met with a representative of the Romani People who argued that there are around 5,000 people still living in Denmark who might be considered descendants of ten Sinti families that came from Schleswig-Holstein in the 19th century. The lack of any documentation in support of a constant presence of Roma families in Denmark is the main reason for no recognition.

=== Russian ===
Use of Russian in Denmark emerged with Jewish immigrants from Russian-controlled areas around 1900, who primarily spoke Yiddish but also Russian. After the October Revolution in 1917, Russian refugees, including aristocrats and professionals, settled in Denmark and maintained the Russian language, forming a community around the Alexander Nevsky Church in Copenhagen. This permanent Russian immigrant community, sustained by ongoing immigration, actively uses Russian in family, social circles, and associations.

=== Yiddish ===
Yiddish language emerged in Denmark from 1640 when Yiddish-speaking Jews in Altona came under Danish rule, with Jews later permitted to establish synagogues in Fredericia in 1682 and Copenhagen in 1684. By the late 18th century, 1,503 of the 1,830 Danish Jews lived in Copenhagen, where Yiddish appeared in printed works from Altona and Wandsbek until 1859 and 1860. A 1814 decree required legal documents, previously in Yiddish, to use Danish, and schools like Friskolen and Carolineskolen taught Hebrew but not Yiddish. Historical dictionaries, such as the Royal Danish Academy and that of Molbech described Yiddish as a corrupted Hebrew dialect, while terms like "German-Hebrew" and "Jargon" appeared in 19th-century literature to denote Yiddish.

Between the late 19th century and 1914, around 10 and 12,000 Jewish migrants passed through Copenhagen, with approximately 3,000 settling in the Yiddish-speaking community from 1904 until the mid-1950s. Many of these migrants, predominantly workers, embraced Yiddishism, viewing Yiddish as the national language of Jews, fostering a rich linguistic culture that peaked before 1920, adapted to Danish society between 1920 and 1943, and declined through assimilation by the mid-1950s.

== See also ==
- Danish dialects

== Bibliography ==
- Winge, Vibeke (2021). Hjorth, Ebba (ed.). Dansk sproghistorie - Dansk i samspil (in Danish) (5 ed.). Aarhus University Press.
