= Tønder Municipality =

Municipality in Southern Denmark

Tønder Municipality Tønder Kommune (Danish) Kommune Tondern (German) Tuner Komuun (North Frisian)
- Municipality
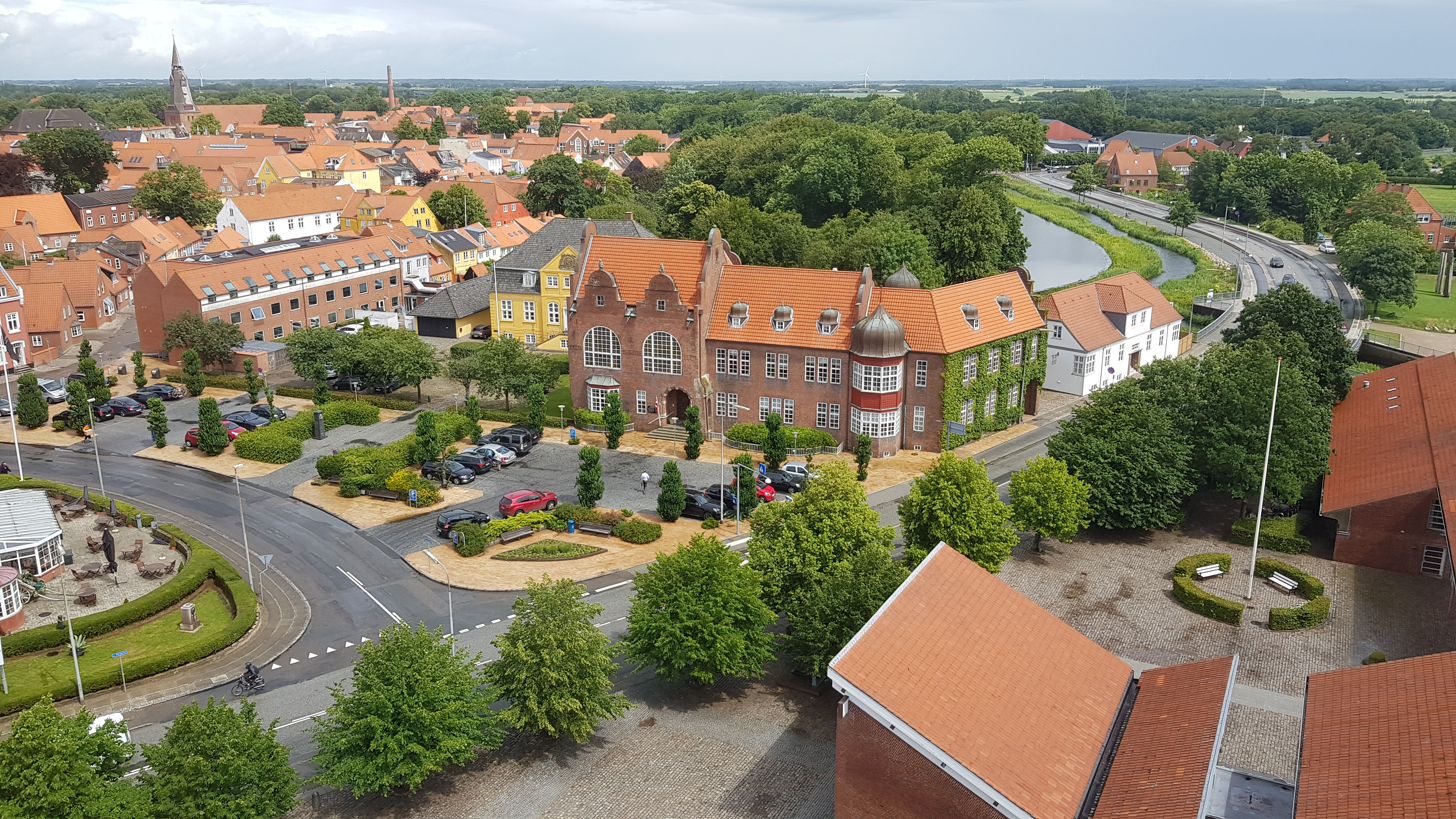

- Coat of arms

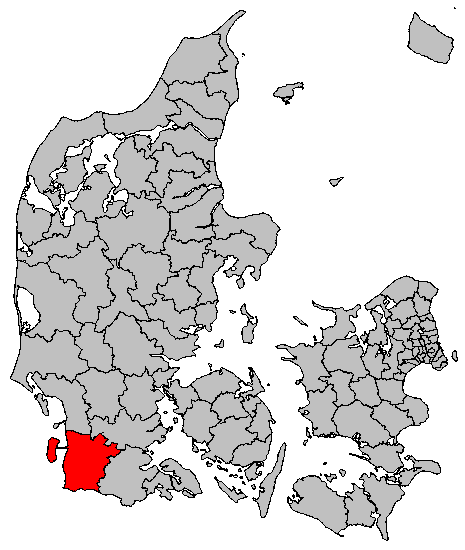
- Location in Denmark
- Coordinates: 54°56′00″N 8°54′00″E
- Country: Denmark
- Region: Southern Denmark
- Established: 1 January 2007

Government
  - Mayor: Jørgen Popp Petersen (Schleswig Party)

Area
  - Total: 1,252 km^{2} (483 sq mi)

Population (1 January 2026)
  - Total: 36,174
  - Density: 28.89/km^{2} (74.83/sq mi)
- Time zone: UTC+1 (CET)
  - Summer (DST): UTC+2 (CEST)
- Postal code: 6270
- Website: www.toender.dk

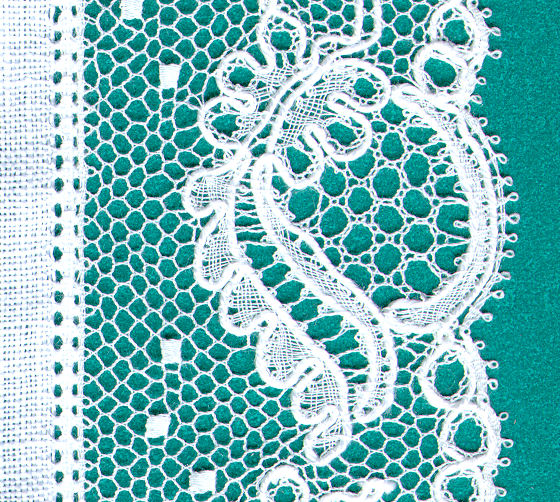
An example of a traditional Tønder lace (Tønderknipling)

Tønder Municipality (Danish: Tønder Kommune, German: Kommune Tondern, North Frisian: Tuner Komuun) is a kommune in the Region of Southern Denmark on the Jutland peninsula in south Denmark. The municipality covers an area of 1,252 km^{2}, and has a total population of 36,174 (2026). Its mayor is Jørgen Popp Petersen, a member of the regional Schleswig Party.

The main town and the site of its municipal council is the town of Tønder. It consists of six old municipalities, the former Tønder municipality (1970-2006) with 12,706 inhabitants in January 2000 on 184.59 square kilometers among them.

== Subdivision ==
The municipality was created in 1970 as the result of a kommunalreform ("Municipal Reform") that merged a number of existing parishes:

- Abild Parish
- Hostrup Parish
- Møgeltønder Parish
- Tønder Parish
- Ubjerg Parish

== Locations ==
Tønder	7,500
Løgumkloster	3,500
Toftlund	3,200
Skærbæk	3,100
Bredebro	1,400
Agerskov	1,200
Højer	1,100
Møgeltønder	800
Abild	500
Øster Højst	500
Bedsted	450
Jejsing	450
Brøns	400
Visby	350
Døstrup	350
Arrild	300
Husum-Ballum	300
Branderup	270
Havneby	270
Rejsby	270

== History ==
On 1 January 2007, Tønder municipality was enlarged as the result of Kommunalreformen ("The Municipal Reform" of 2007) when the Bredebro, Højer, Løgumkloster, Nørre-Rangstrup (without Bevtoft Parish), and Skærbæk municipalities were merged into the new Tønder municipality.

== Politics ==
Tønder's municipal council consists of 31 members, elected every four years. The municipal council has nine political committees.

=== Municipal council ===
Below are the municipal councils elected since the Municipal Reform of 2007.

Election	Party												Total seats	Turnout	Elected mayor
Election	A	C	D	F	I	K	L	O	S	T	V	Ø	Total seats	Turnout	Elected mayor
2005	9	2		1		1		1	1		16		31	73.0%	Vagn Terkel Pedersen (V)
2009	9	2		3				2	2		13		31	68.1%	Laurids Rudebeck (V)
2013	7	1		1	1			3	3		14	1	31	73.3%	Laurids Rudebeck (V)
2017	6	1		1	1		1	3	2		15	1	31	72.0%	Henrik Frandsen (V)
2021	5	2	1	1			3		4	9	6		31	69.8%	Jørgen Popp Petersen (S)
Data from Kmdvalg.dk 2005, 2009, 2013, 2017 and 2021

== North Schleswig Germans ==
Tønder Municipality is home to the only officially recognised ethno-linguistic minority of Denmark proper, the North Schleswig Germans. This minority makes up about 6% of the total population of the municipalities of Aabenraa/Apenrade, Haderslev/Hadersleben, Sønderborg/Sonderburg and Tønder/Tondern. In these four municipalities, the German minority enjoys certain linguistic rights in accordance with the European Charter for Regional or Minority Languages.
