= Abild, Denmark =

Village in Southern Denmark

Abild
- Village
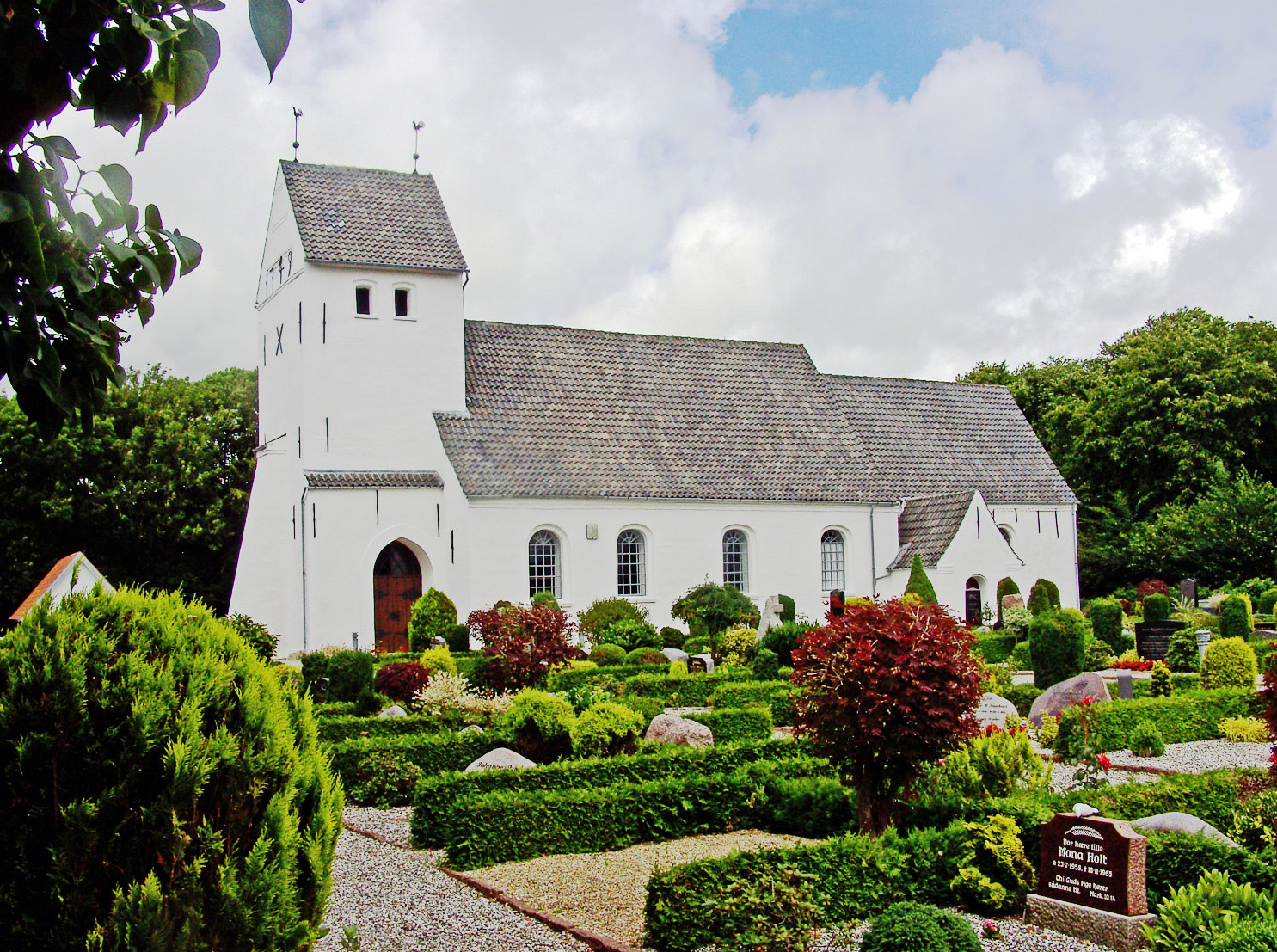
- Abild Church

- Location within Region of Southern Denmark Location within Denmark
- Coordinates: 54°58′48″N 8°51′47″E
- Country: Denmark
- Region: Southern Denmark
- Municipality: Tønder Municipality

Population (2026)
  - Total: 505

Abild is a village, with a population of 505 (1 January 2026), in Tønder Municipality, Region of Southern Denmark in Denmark.

Abild is located 5 km north of Tønder, 11 km south of Løgumkloster and 42 km west of Aabenraa.

Abild Church is located in the village.
