= Løgum Abbey =

Coordinates: 55.0569°N 8.95049°E

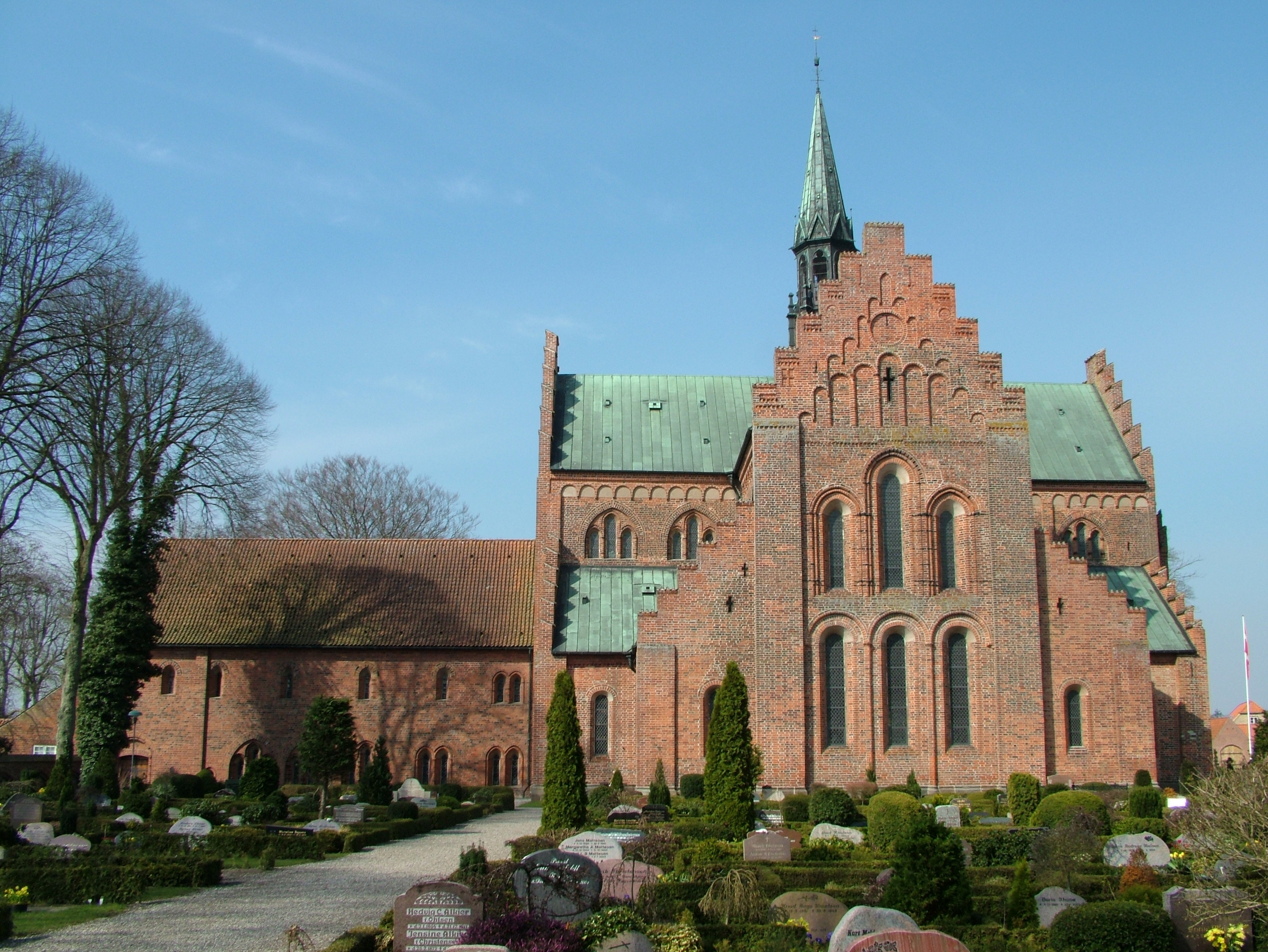
Løgumkloster Church

Løgum Abbey (Danish: Løgum kloster; German: Kloster Lügum) was a Cistercian monastery in the present town of Løgumkloster in North Schleswig, Denmark. In 1548, the monastery was closed down. The site is now occupied by Løgumkloster Church.

== History ==
Løgum Abbey was founded in 1173 by Bishop Stefan of Ribe who had previously been at Herrevad Abbey in Skåne, the first Cistercian foundation in Denmark (now in Sweden). Løgum was in a sense a daughter house to Herrevad. The abbey was called "Locus Dei" in Latin (Guds sted in Danish), meaning "God's place" and dedicated to the Virgin Mary. The new wooden monastery was destroyed by a fire in 1190. Bishop Omer of Ribe encouraged monks from other monasteries to go to Løgum to rebuild the abbey and its church. King Valdemar II gave it several farms to provide it with a steady income. The surviving four-sided abbey complex was constructed of red bricks apparently manufactured on the site in the Gothic style. It was completed during the first decades of the 14th century and consisted of the church and at least two wings, one for the monks and one for guests and the hospital. After the Reformation, the monks were allowed to remain in the monastery until after the death of the abbot in 1548.

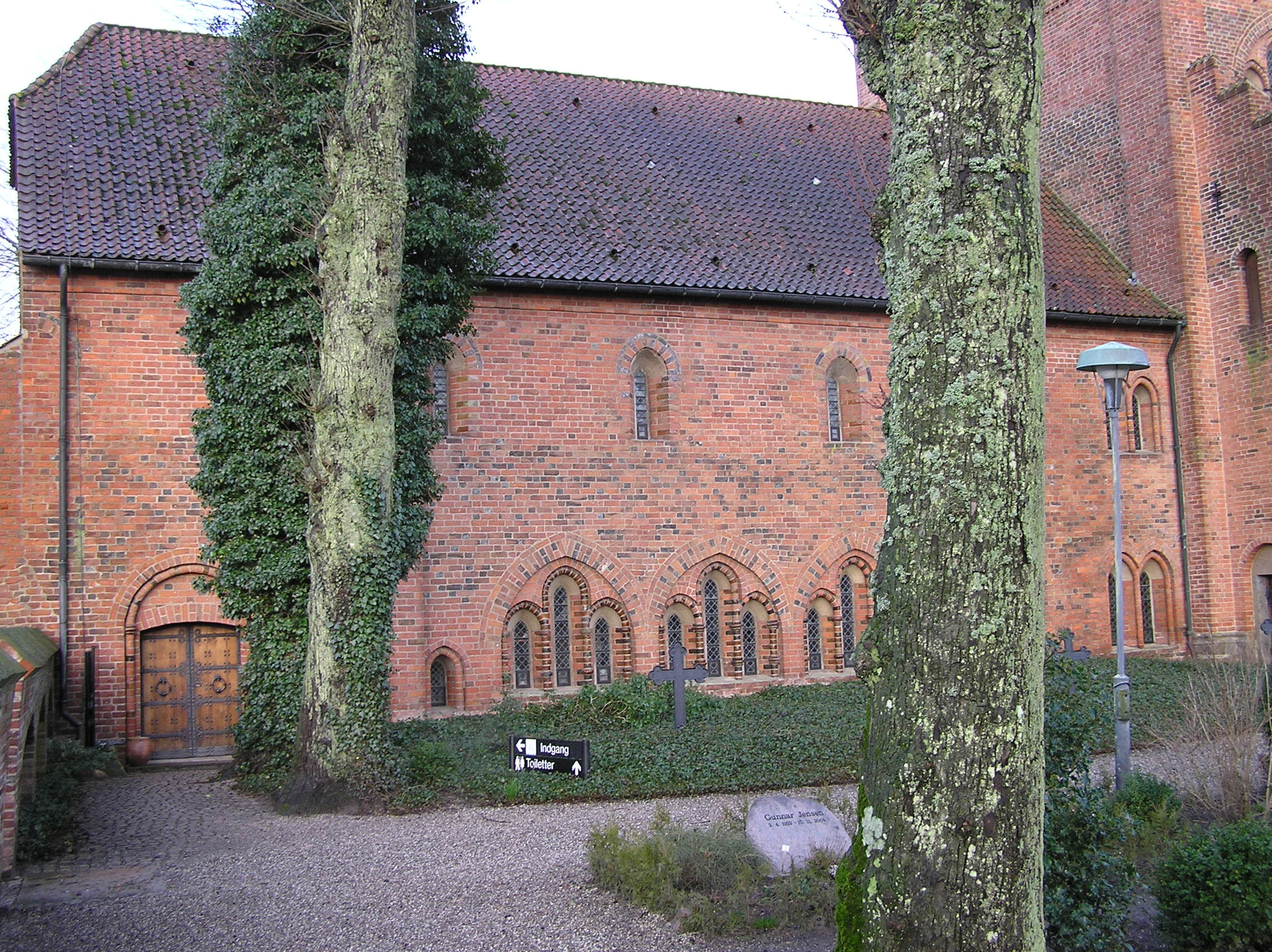
The remaining east wing of Løgum Abbey

== Løgumkloster Church ==
When the abbey was dissolved during the Reformation, the church became the parish church of Løgumkloster. Løgumkloster Church (Løgumkloster Kirke) and one wing of the conventual buildings has survived to modern times. The church was built as the north range of the abbey precinct in the form of a Latin cross with a nave and two side aisles. Chapels were added down the sides of the nave over time.

The present church building shows a mix of Romanesque and Gothic styles: some arches are rounded Romanesque arches, and others are the characteristic pointed arches of the Gothic style. The tower over the transept contains three bells. The oldest, preserved from the original abbey, dates from 1442 and was cast by an unknown bell maker. The other two bells were relatively recently cast, by De Smithske in 1924 and 1925.

== Other sources ==
- Wissing, Jürgen, 1972: Kloster Lögum, in Schriften der Heimatkundlichen Arbeitsgemeinschaft für Nordschleswig, Heft 26, 1972 (in German)
- Bartholdy, Olga (2006) Munkeliv i Løgum Kloster (Foreningen Klostermærken) ISBN 8788684016
