= Vidå =

River in Denmark

Coordinates: 54°56′N 8°54′E

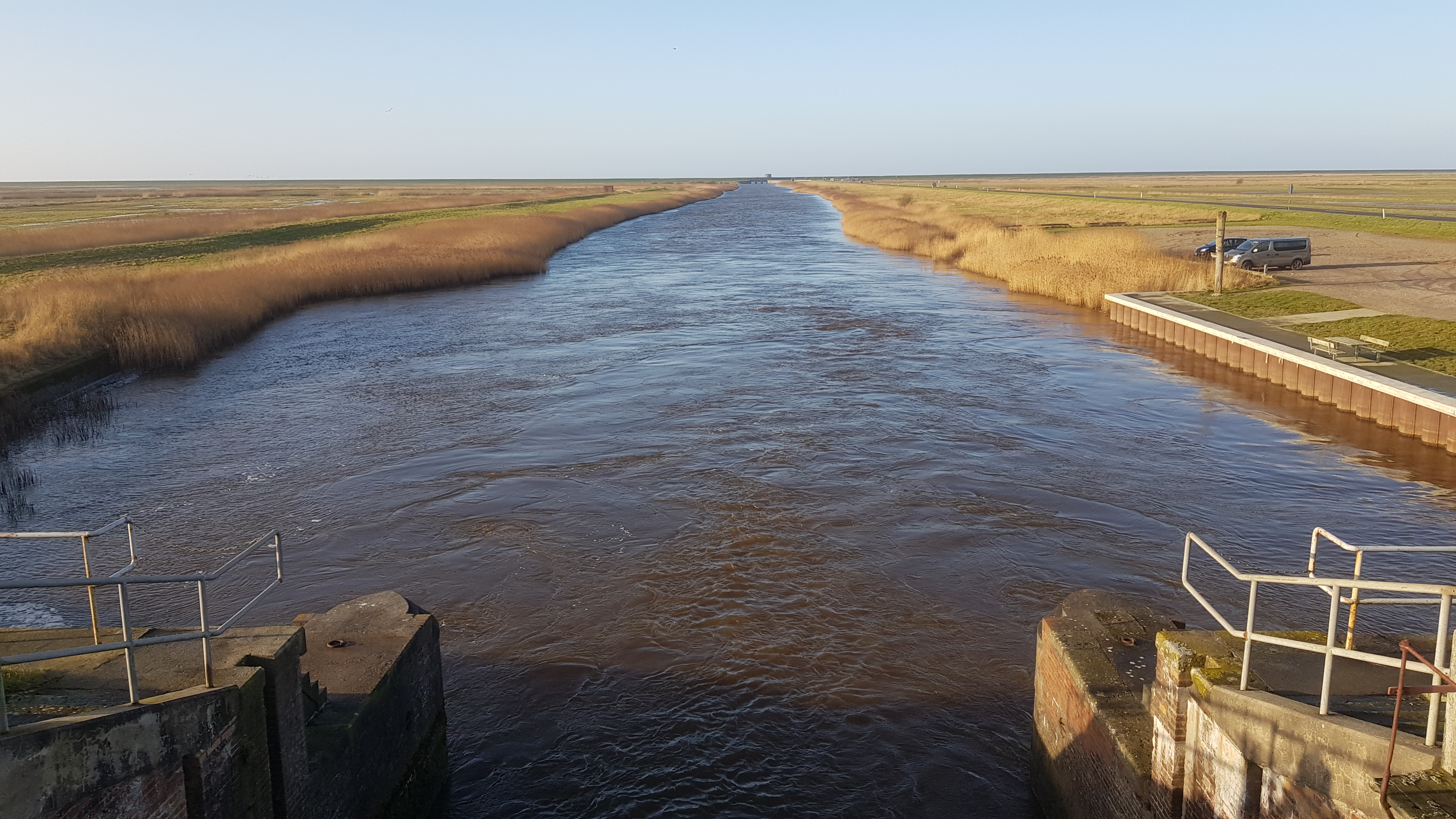
The Vidå River seen from Højer Old Lock in the direction of the new one

The Vidå or, with the definite article, Vidåen (German: Wiedau, North Frisian Widuu) is a creek in the Jutland region of Denmark. The creek starts east of Tønder and flows around sixty-nine kilometres to the west, ending in the North Sea near Højer. In places the Vidå marks the border between Denmark and Germany (through the Rudbøl Sø).

South of the river live the North Frisians.

== Name ==
The name of the river is first attested as such in 1648 as Wieday and in 1781 as Widaae and Hvidaae. However, the river gave its name to a Propstei (church or monastery led by a provost) which held North Friesland and whose name is attested in 1240 in the form de Withæ a and 1352 as in ... Withaa. It also produced the district name Wiedingharde (North Friesland, Duchy of Schleswig), first attested in 1511 as Wyding herde, meaning "administrative district of the people on the Wieday". Albrecht Greule, surveying earlier scholarship, tentatively interpreted the name to mean "pasture" (Weide). This is consistent with Morten Søvsø's characterisation of the river: "the Tønder Marsh around the major watercourse of the Vid River (Vidåen) cuts deep into the land, and once offered extensive pasturelands for the farmers of the marsh".

The river-name has also been thought to be found in the ethnonym Wiþmyrgingas, which appears in the Old English poem Widsith.
