= Bredebro =

Town in Denmark

- Town
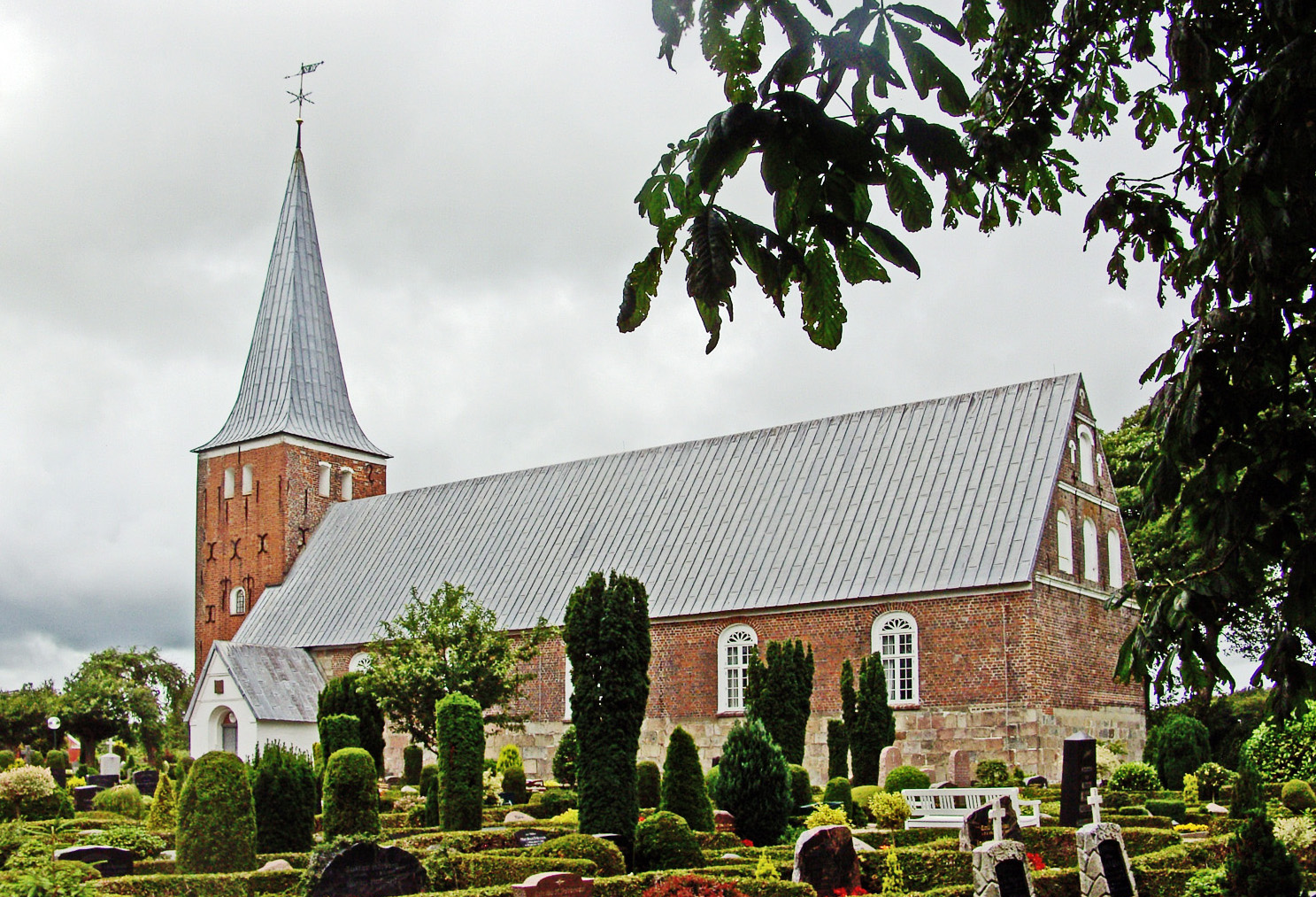
- Brede Church in Bredebro

- Location in Region of Southern Denmark Bredebro (Denmark)
- Coordinates: 55°3′19″N 8°49′22″E
- Country: Denmark
- Region: Southern Denmark
- Municipality: Tønder Municipality

Area
  - Urban: 1.93 km^{2} (0.75 sq mi)

Population (2026)
  - Urban: 1,428
  - Urban density: 740/km^{2} (1,920/sq mi)
- Time zone: UTC+1 (CET)
  - Summer (DST): UTC+2 (CEST)
- Postal code: DK-6261 Bredebro

Bredebro is a railway town with a population of 1,428 (1 January 2026) in Region of Southern Denmark in Denmark on the Jutland peninsula. It is located 10 km west of Løgumkloster, 34 km south of Ribe and 14 km north of Tønder and is served by Bredebro railway station on the Bramming–Tønder railway line.

The town was the original home of the ECCO shoe manufacturing company.

Until 1 January 2007 Bredebro was the seat of the former Bredebro Municipality (Danish, kommune).

== Bredebro Municipality ==
The former Bredebro Municipality covered an area of 151 km^{2}, and had a total population of 3,680 (2005). Its last mayor was Vagn Therkel Pedersen, a member of the Venstre (Liberal Party) political party. The municipality was created in 1970 as the result of a kommunalreform ("Municipality Reform") that combined the Ballum, Brede, Randerup, Sønder, and Visby parishes.

Bredebo Municipality ceased to exist due to Kommunalreformen ("The Municipality Reform" of 2007). It was merged with Højer, Løgumkloster, Nørre-Rangstrup, Skærbæk, and Tønder municipalities to form the new Tønder Municipality. This created a municipality with an area of 1,352 square kilometres (522 sq mi) and a total population of 42,645 (2005).
