= Nørre-Rangstrup =

Former municipality in Denmark

Coordinates: 55°11′20″N 9°04′00″E

Until 1 January 2007 Nørre-Rangstrup (German: Rangstrup), was a municipality (Danish, kommune) in the former South Jutland County on the Jutland peninsula in south Denmark. The municipality covered an area of 302 km^{2}, and had a total population of 9,502 (2005). Its last mayor was Ole Østvig Nissen, a member of the Venstre (Liberal Party) political party. The main town and the site of its municipal council was the town of Toftlund.

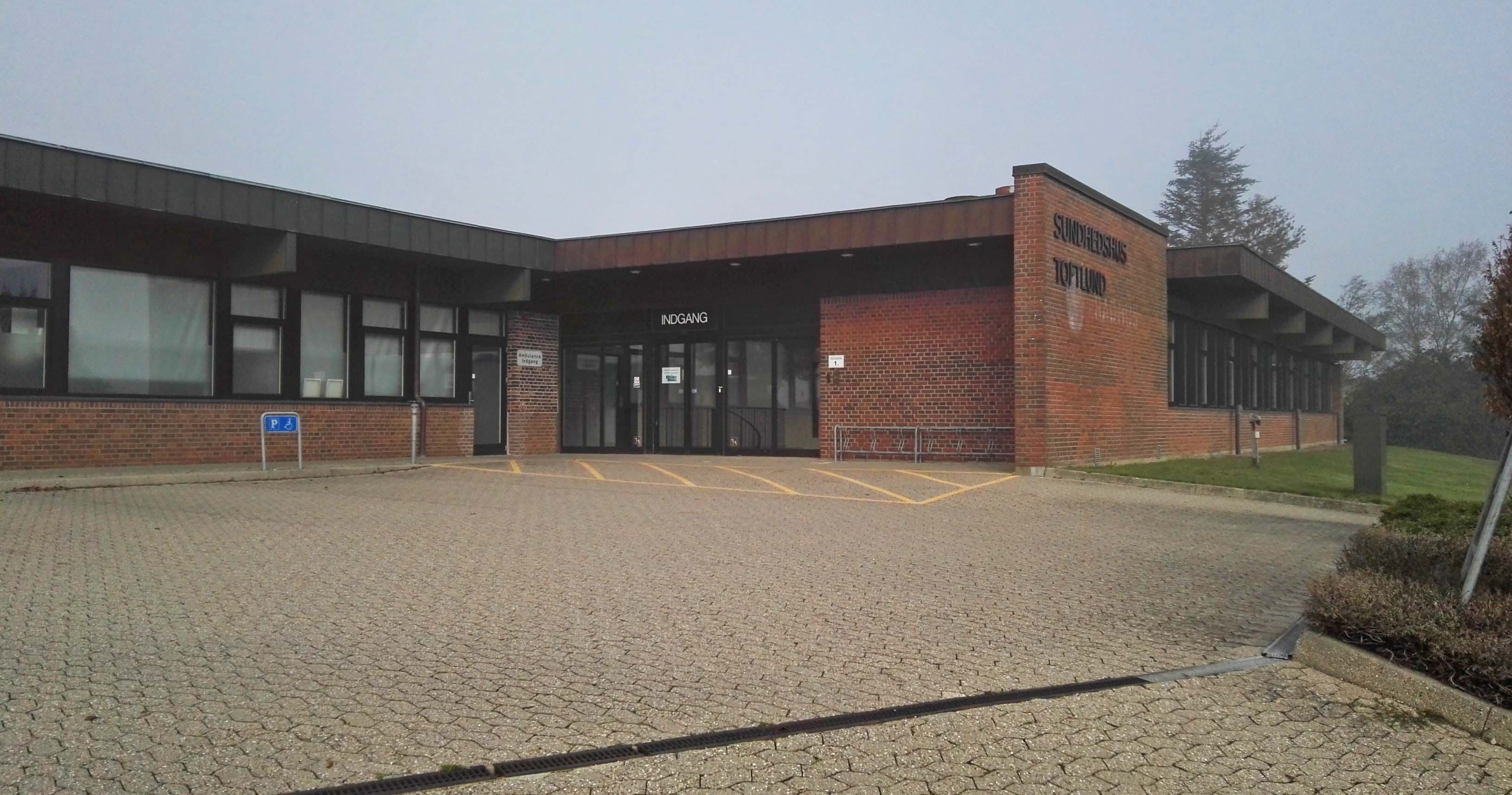
The former townhall of Nørre-Rangstrup Municipality in Toftlund

The municipality was created in 1970 as the result of a kommunalreform ("Municipality Reform") that merged a number of existing parishes:

- Agerskov (German: Aggerschau), Parish
- Arrild Parish
- Bevtoft (German: Beftoft), Parish
- Branderup Parish
- Tirslund (German: Tieslund), Parish
- Toftlund Parish

Nørre-Rangstrup municipality ceased to exist due to Kommunalreformen ("The Municipality Reform" of 2007). It was merged with existing Bredebro, Højer, Løgumkloster, Skærbæk, and Tønder municipalities to form the new Tønder municipality. This created a municipality with an area of 1,352 km^{2} and a total population of 42,645 (2005).

== Notable people ==
- Frode Sørensen (born 1946 at Toftlund) a Danish politician, was Tax Minister 2000-2001 and a Member of Parliament (Folketinget) 1998-2007
