= Højer =

- Town
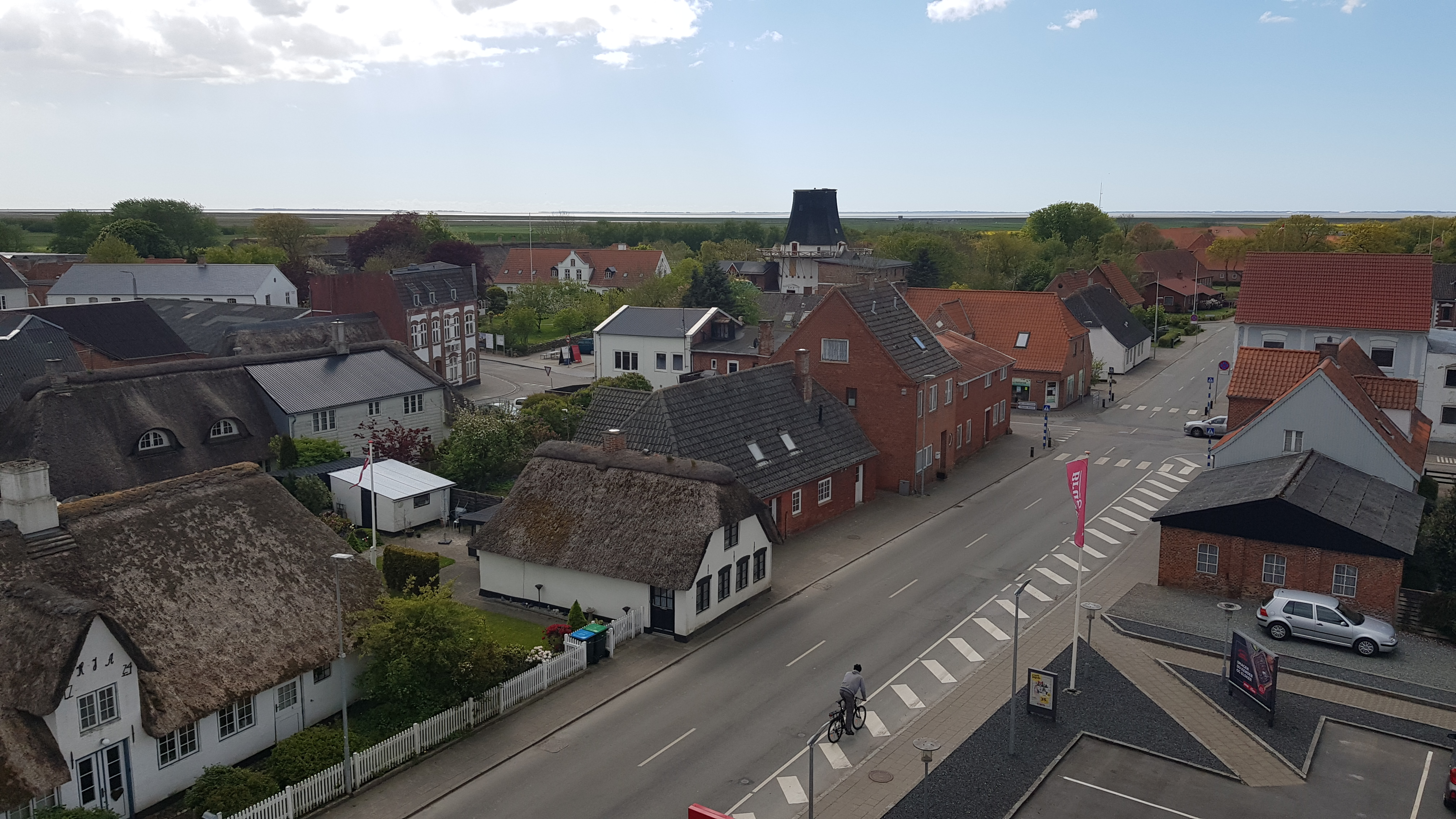
- View over the town from the watertower

- Location in Region of Southern Denmark Højer (Denmark)
- Coordinates: 54°57′51″N 8°41′50″E
- Country: Denmark
- Region: Southern Denmark
- Municipality: Tønder Municipality

Area
  - Town: 86.9 km^{2} (33.6 sq mi)
  - Land: 22.5 km^{2} (8.7 sq mi)
  - Urban: 1.0 km^{2} (0.39 sq mi)

Population (2026)
  - Urban: 1,034
  - Urban density: 1,000/km^{2} (2,700/sq mi)
- Time zone: UTC+1 (CET)
  - Summer (DST): UTC+2 (CEST)
- Postal code: DK-6280 Højer

Højer (German: Hoyer; North Frisian: Huuger) is a town with a population of 1,034 (1 January 2026), which was the seat of the former Højer municipality in south Denmark, in Region of Southern Denmark on the west coast of the Jutland peninsula.

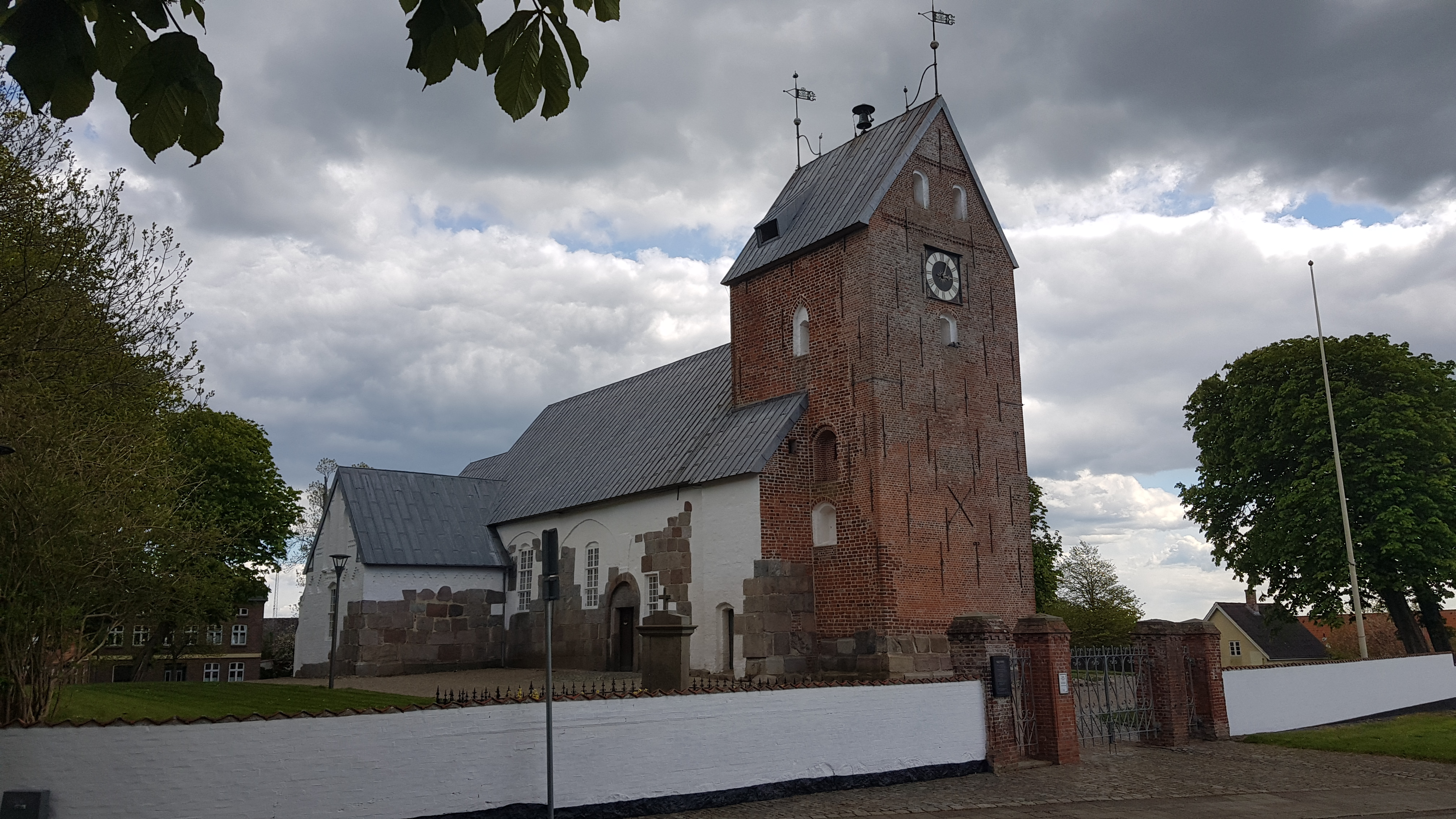
Højer Church

Højer Church is located in the town.

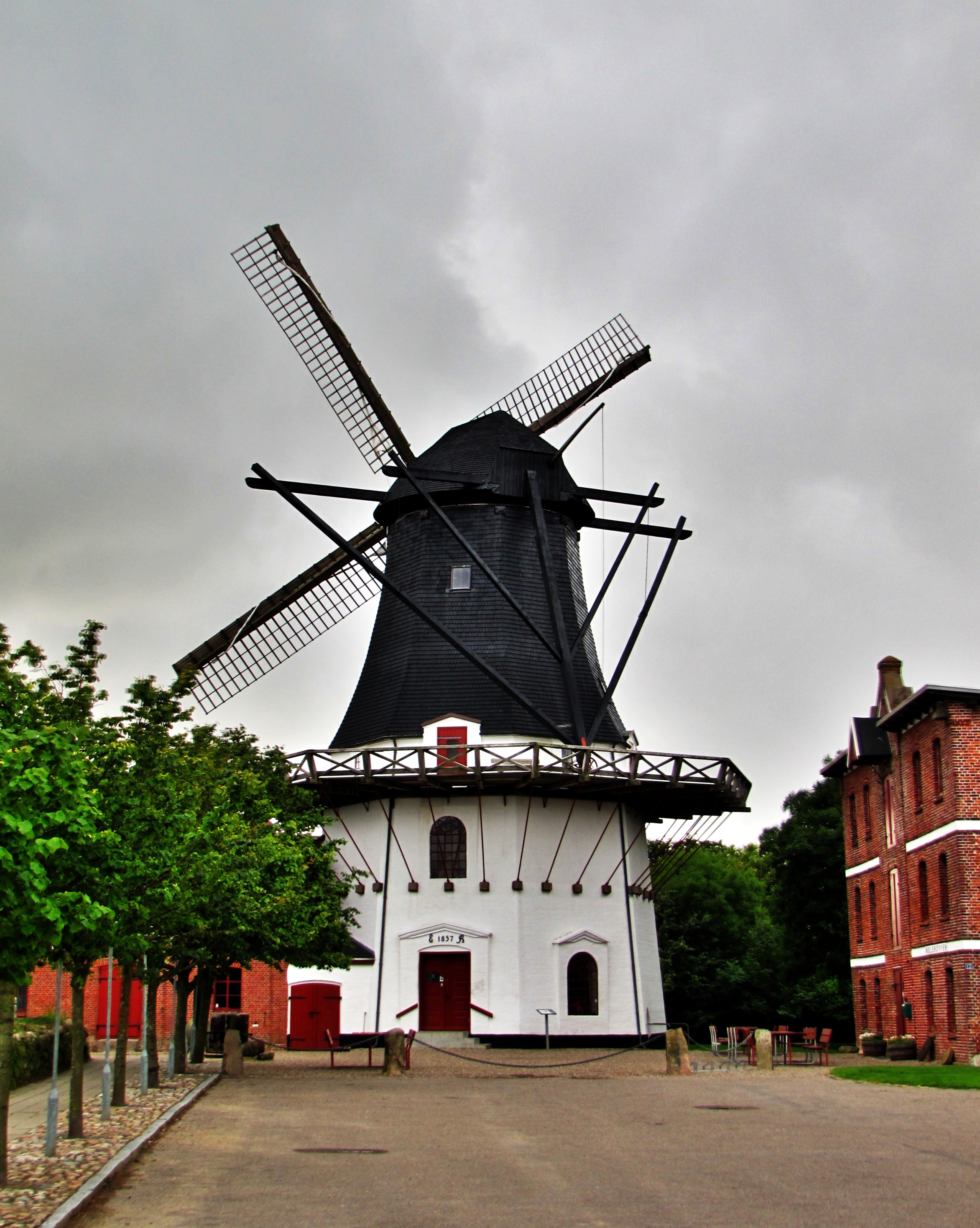
Højer Mølle (Højer Mill)

Højer Mølle (Højer Mill) from 1857 is Northern Europe's tallest Dutch windmill and is now a museum.

== Gallery ==
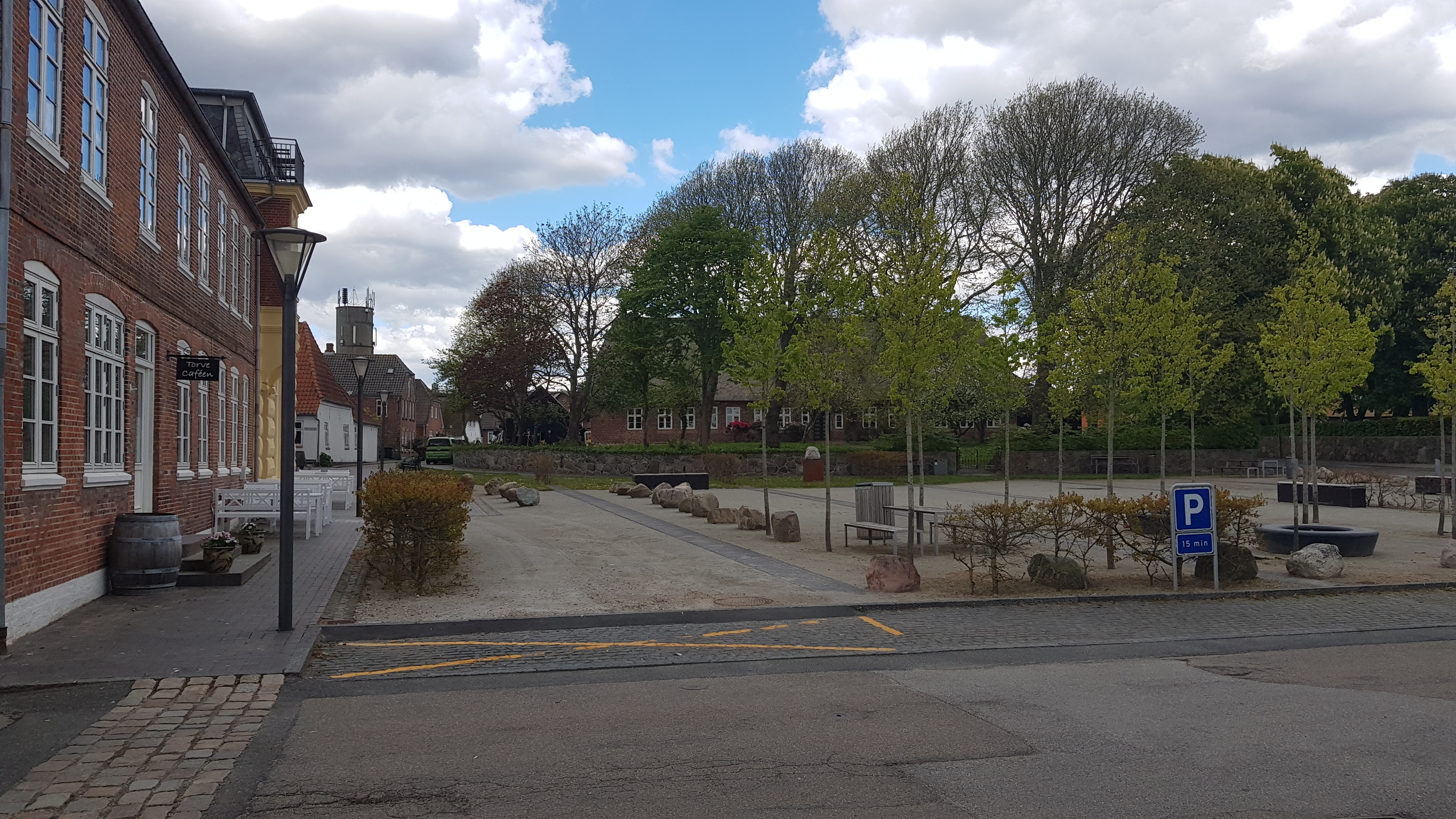
The Square in Højer

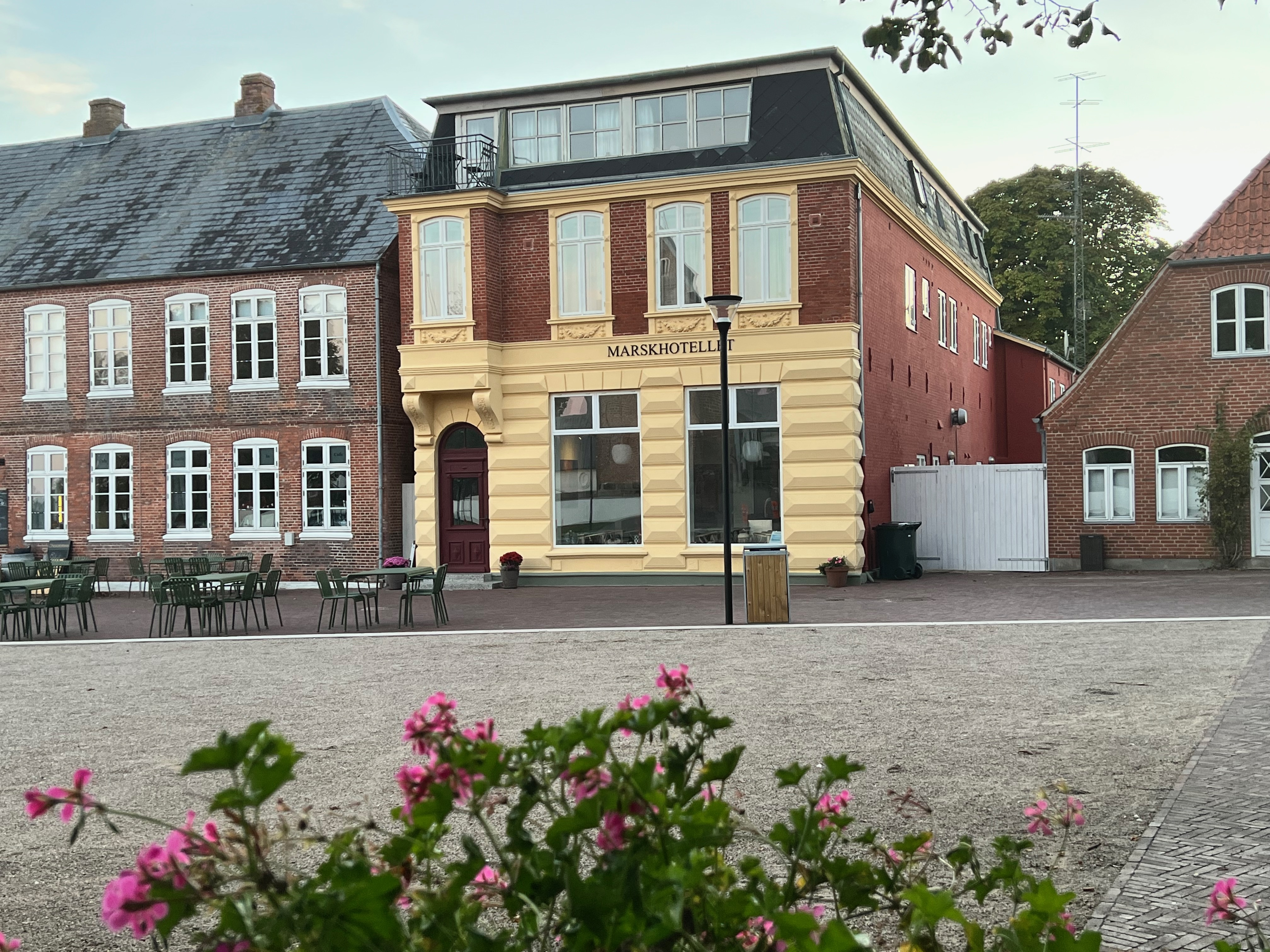
Marskhotellet (The Marshhotel) on the square

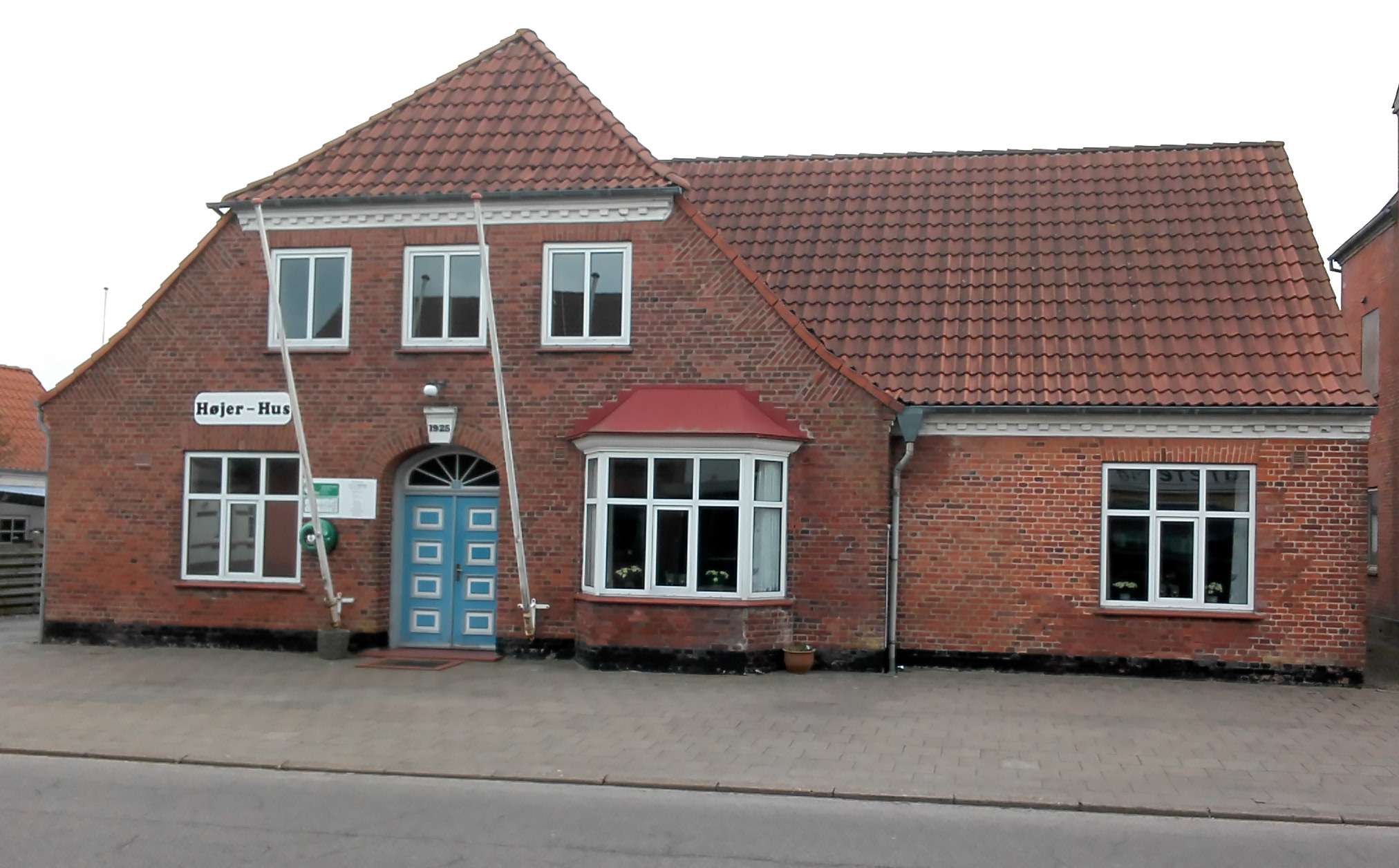
Højerhus, the village hall

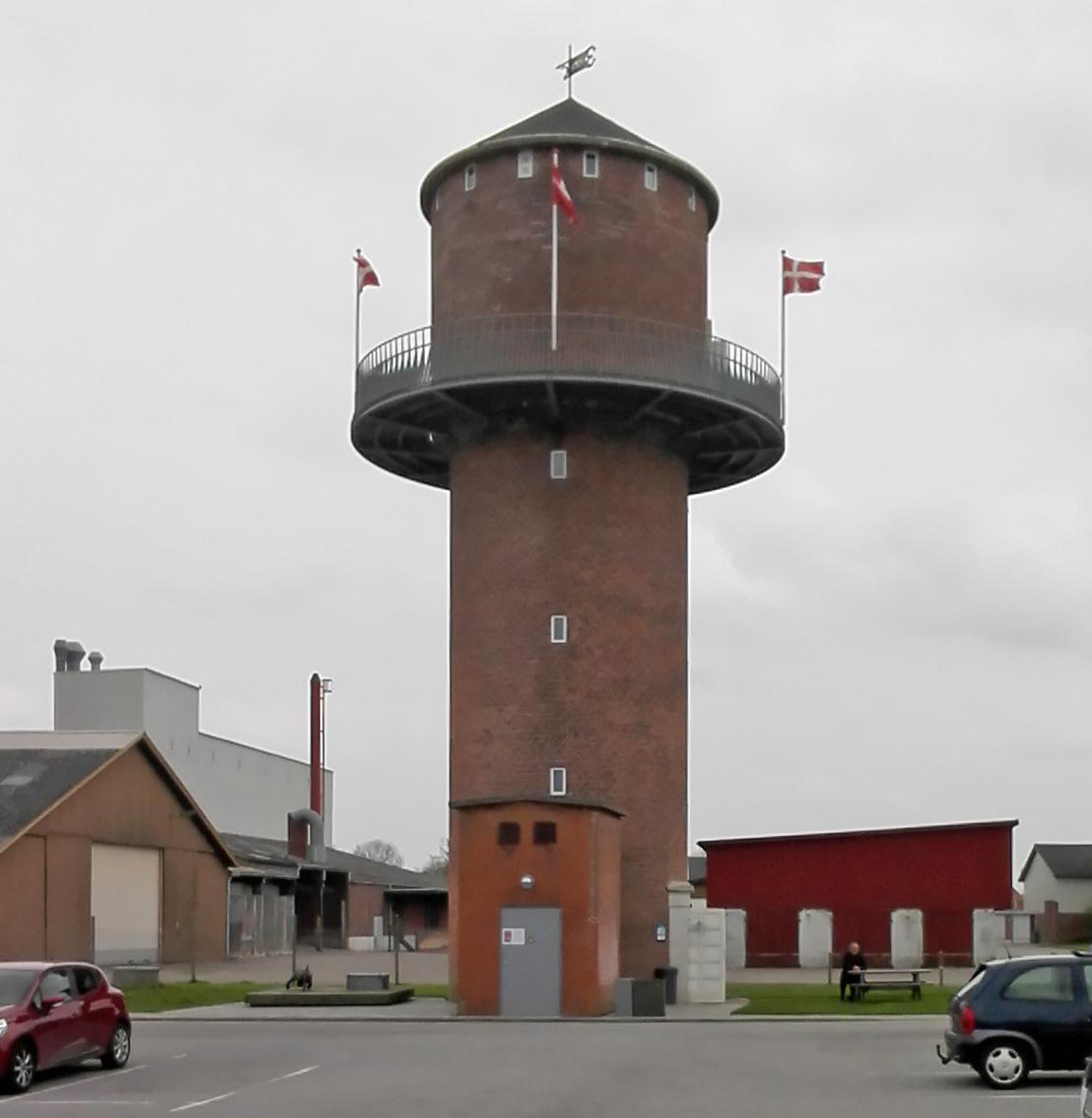
Højer Water tower built in 1934

== Højer Municipality ==
The former Højer Municipality covered an area of 117 km^{2}, and had a total population of 2,861 (2005). Its last mayor was Peter Christensen, a member of the Social Democrats (Socialdemokraterne) political party.

The coastal area of the former municipality is a nature reserve.

The municipality was created in 1970 due to a kommunalreform ("Municipality Reform") that combined a number of existing parishes:

- Daler Parish
- Emmerlev Parish
- Hjerpsted Parish
- Højer Parish

On 1 January 2007 Højer municipality ceased to exist due to Kommunalreformen ("The Municipality Reform" of 2007). It was merged with Bredebro, Løgumkloster, Nørre-Rangstrup, Skærbæk, and Tønder municipalities to form the new Tønder Municipality. This created a municipality with an area of 1,352 km^{2} and a total population of 42,645 (2005).
