= Løgumkloster =

Danish town

Løgumkloster Lügumkloster (German)
- Town
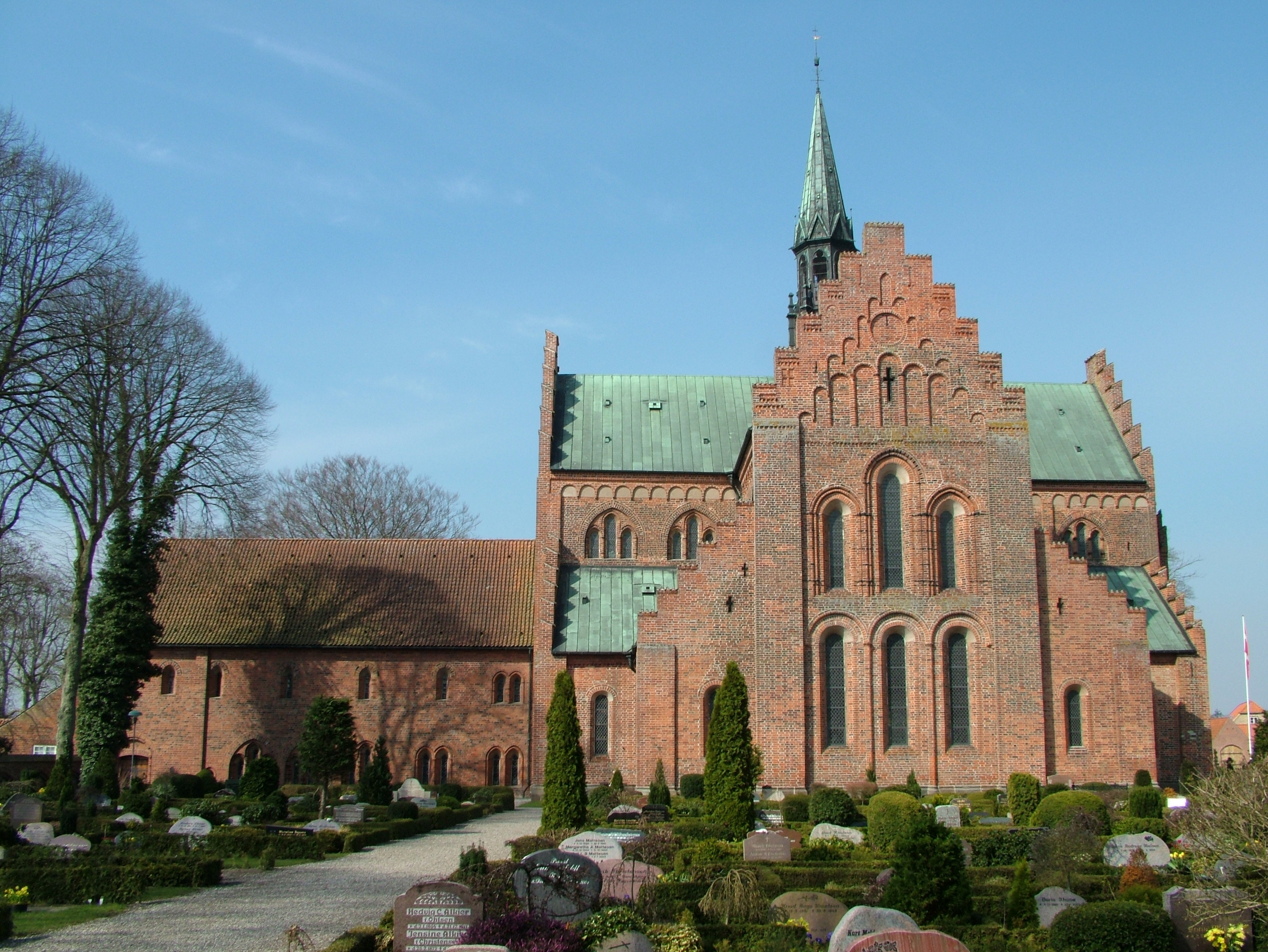
- Løgumkloster church

- Location in Denmark Løgumkloster (Region of Southern Denmark)
- Coordinates: 55°3′34″N 8°57′6″E
- Country: Denmark
- Region: Southern Denmark
- Municipality: Tønder Municipality

Area
  - Urban: 3.32 km^{2} (1.28 sq mi)

Population (2026)
  - Urban: 3,458
  - Urban density: 1,040/km^{2} (2,700/sq mi)
  - Gender: 1,685 males and 1,773 females
- Time zone: UTC+1 (CET)
  - Summer (DST): UTC+2 (CEST)
- Postal code: DK-6240 Løgumkloster

Løgumkloster (German: Lügumkloster; both mean 'Løgum monastery'), is a town in Tønder Municipality in Region of Southern Denmark on the Jutland peninsula in south Denmark with a population of 3,458 (1 January 2026). Its name testifies that the town was once the site of the Cistercian Løgum Abbey, in the then Roman Catholic diocese of Ribe.

Løgumkloster was the municipal seat of the now abolished Løgumkloster Municipality.

== Notable people ==
- Hans Nicolajsen (1803 in Løgumkloster – 1856 in Jerusalem) a Danish missionary to Palestine for the London Society for Promoting Christianity Among the Jews
- Andreas Riis (1804 in Løgumkloster – 1854 in Naksby) a Danish missionary to the Gold Coast for the Basel Evangelical Missionary Society
