= Schack =

Schack may refer to:

== People ==
- Adolf Friedrich von Schack (1815–1894), German poet and historian of literature
- Adolph Wilhelm Schack von Staffeldt (1769–1826), Danish poet
- Anna Sophie Schack, née Rantzau (1689–1760), Danish noblewoman, landowner and builder.
- Barbara Schack (1873/4–1958), Sudeten German politician
- Benedikt Schack (1758–1826), Bohemian composer and tenor
- Bo Schack (born 1955), Danish lawyer
- Friedrich-August Schack (1892–1968), German general of World War II
- Gertrude Guillaume-Schack, born Gertrud Gräfin Schack von Wittenau (1845–1903), German women's rights activist
- Günther Schack (1917–2003), World War II German aviator
- Hans Schack (1608–1676), Danish privy councillor and field marshal
- Otto Wilhelm Christian Schack (1818–1875), Danish-born American financier
- Roberta Arline Schack (born 1929), American actress better known as Roberta Haynes
- Sophus Schack (1811–1864), Danish painter and soldier
- Thore Schäck (born 1985), German economist and politician
- Torsten Schack Pedersen (born 1976), Danish politician

== Counts of Schackenborg ==
- Otto Didrik Schack, 1st Count of Schackenborg (1652–1683)
- Hans Schack, 2nd Count of Schackenborg (1676–1719)
- Otto Didrik Schack, 3rd Count of Schackenborg (1710–1741)
- Hans Schack, 4th Count of Schackenborg (1734–1796)
- Otto Didrik Schack, 5th Count of Schackenborg (1758–1809)
- Hans Schack, 6th Count of Schackenborg (1786–1814)

== See also ==
- Schackenborg Castle
