= Hans Schack (disambiguation) =

Hans Schack may refer to:

- Hans Schack (1608–1676)
- Hans Schack, 2nd Count of Schackenborg (1676–1719)
- Hans Schack, 4th Count of Schackenborg (1734–1796)
- Hans Schack, 6th Count of Schackenborg (1786–1814)
