= Otto Schack =

Otto Schack may refer to:

- Otto Didrik Schack, 1st Count of Schackenborg (1652–1683)
- Otto Didrik Schack, 3rd Count of Schackenborg (1710–1741), grandson of the above
- Otto Didrik Schack, 9th Count of Schackenborg (1882–1924), last Count of Schackenborg
- Otto Wilhelm Christian Schack (1818–1875), Danish-born American broker
