= Schaack =

Schaack is a surname. Notable people with the surname include:

- Joseph Schaack (born 1945), Luxembourgian politician
- Roland Schaack (born 1973), Luxembourgian footballer and manager
- Sarah Schaack, evolutionary geneticist

== See also ==
- Peter van Schaack (1747–1832), American lawyer
- Schack
