= Carl Jessen =

Carl Jessen may refer to:

- Carl Ludwig Jessen (1833–1917), North Frisian painter
- Carl Wilhelm Jessen (1764–1823), Danish naval officer and governor of St Thomas
