= Otto Didrik Schack, 7th Count of Schackenborg =

Danish nobleman

Otto Didrik Schack
- 7th Count of Schackenborg

Count of Schackenborg
- Tenure: 4 April 1814 – 26 July 1856
- Predecessor: Hans Schack
- Successor: Hans Schack
- Full name: Otto Didrik Schack
- Born: 3 October 1810; Astrupgaard, Duchy of Schleswig
- Died: 26 July 1856 (aged 45); Flensburg, Duchy of Schleswig
- Noble family: Schack
- Spouses: Friederike Rosine Juliane von Krogh (m. 1842–1852) Johanne Christiane Cornelia von Krogh (m. 1856)
- Issue Detail: Hans Schack, 8th Count of Schackenborg; Countess Sophie Schack; stillborn daughter
- Father: Hans Schack, 6th Count of Schackenborg
- Mother: Countess Louise Frederikke Lerche

Otto Didrik Schack, Count of Schackenborg (3 October 1810 – 26 July 1856) was a Danish aristocrat. He was the seventh holder of the Countship of Schackenborg from 1814 to 1856 with the title of enfeoffed count (Danish: lensgreve).

== Biography ==
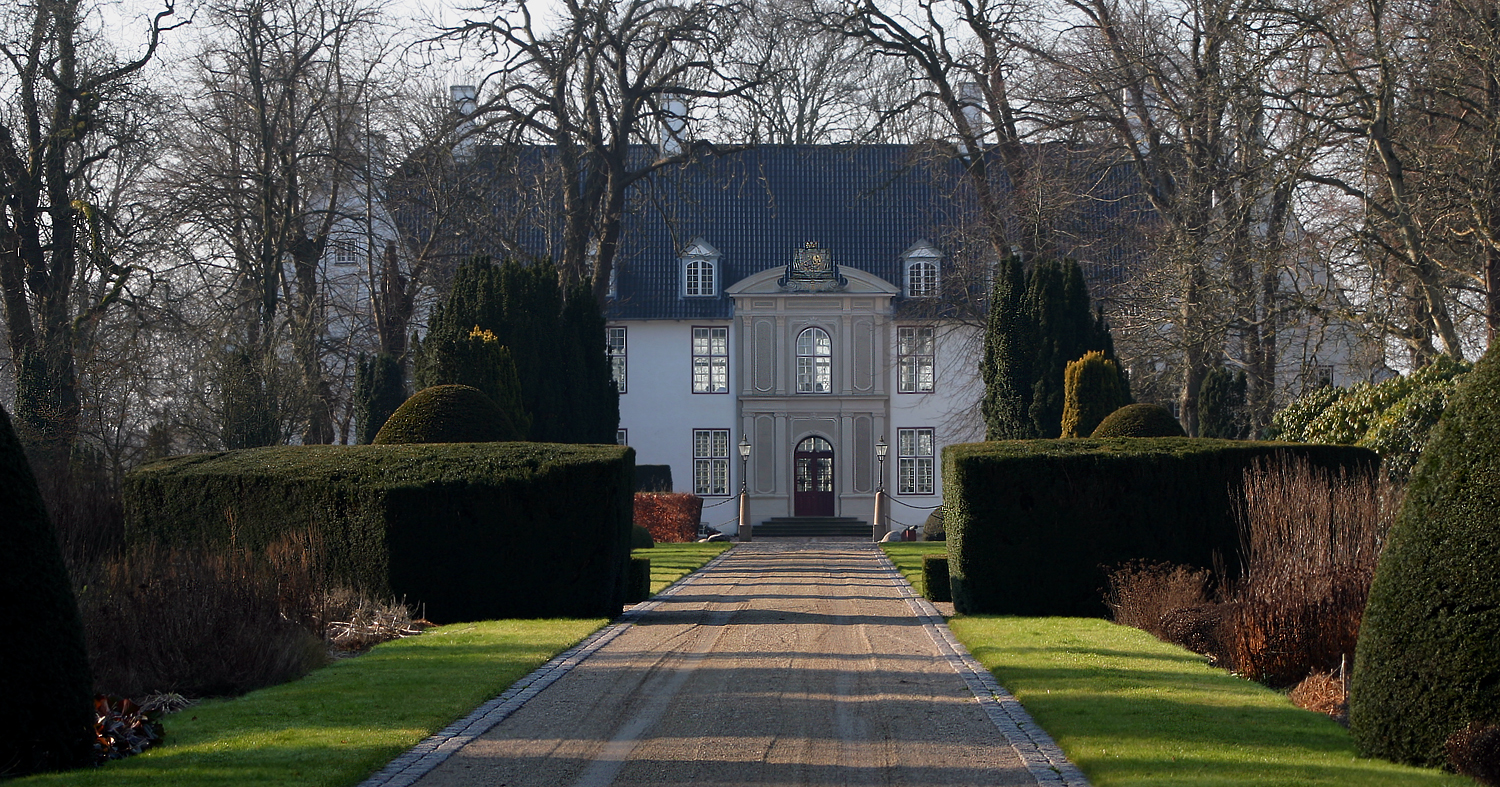
Schackenborg Castle, photographed in 2006.

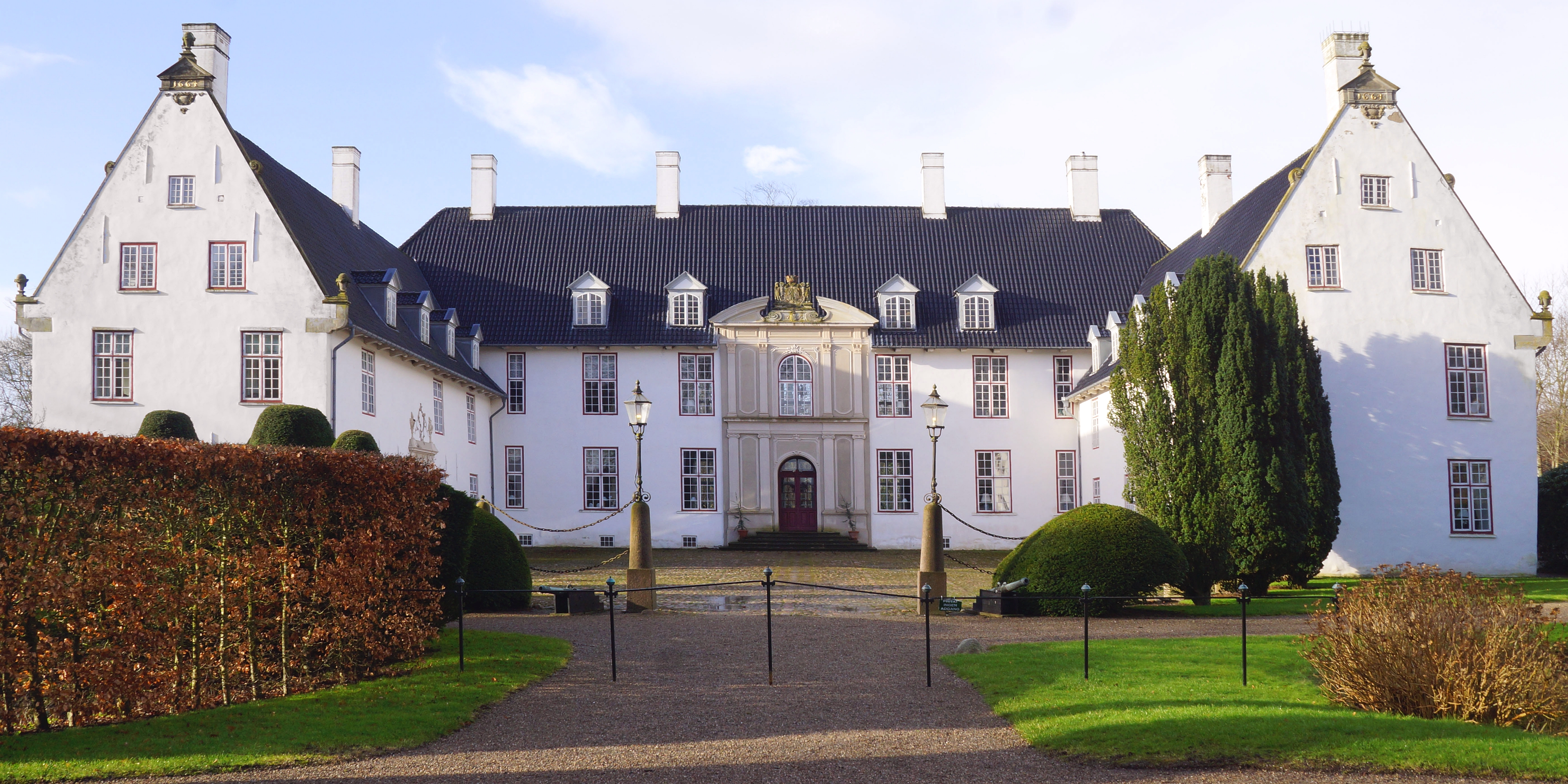
Schackenborg Castle, front from east side (2023)

Otto Didrik Schack was born on 3 October 1810 at Astrupgaard near Brøns in the Duchy of Schleswig. Born into the noble family of Schack, he was the eldest child and only son of the Danish nobleman and civil servant Hans Schack, and his wife Countess Louise Frederikke Lerche.

At the death of his father on 4 April 1814, he inherited the Countship of Schackenborg and assumed the title of enfeoffed count. As he was a minor, the countship was placed under administration until he came of age. In 1853 he was appointed chamberlain.

Count Schack died on 26 July 1856, aged just 45, in Flensburg in the Duchy of Schleswig. He was succeeded as Count of Schackenborg by his only child, Hans Schack.

== Family ==
Count Schack married firstly on 15 May 1842 in Tønder Friederike Rosine Juliane von Krogh, daughter of aristocrat and amtmann Frederik Christian von Krogh and countess Cornelia Sophie Lerche, by whom he had one son.

- Hans Schack, who succeeded him as 8th Count of Schackenborg (1852–1905)

Count Schack married secondly on 5 June 1856 in Dänischenhagen Johanne Christiane Cornelia von Krogh, sister of his first wife.

== Notes and references ==
=== Bibliography ===
- Danmarks Adels Aarbog 1932 (PDF). Copenhagen: J.H. Schultz. 1932.

Danish nobility
Preceded by Hans Schack	Count of Schackenborg; 1814–1856	Succeeded by Hans Schack
