= Møgeltønder =

- Town
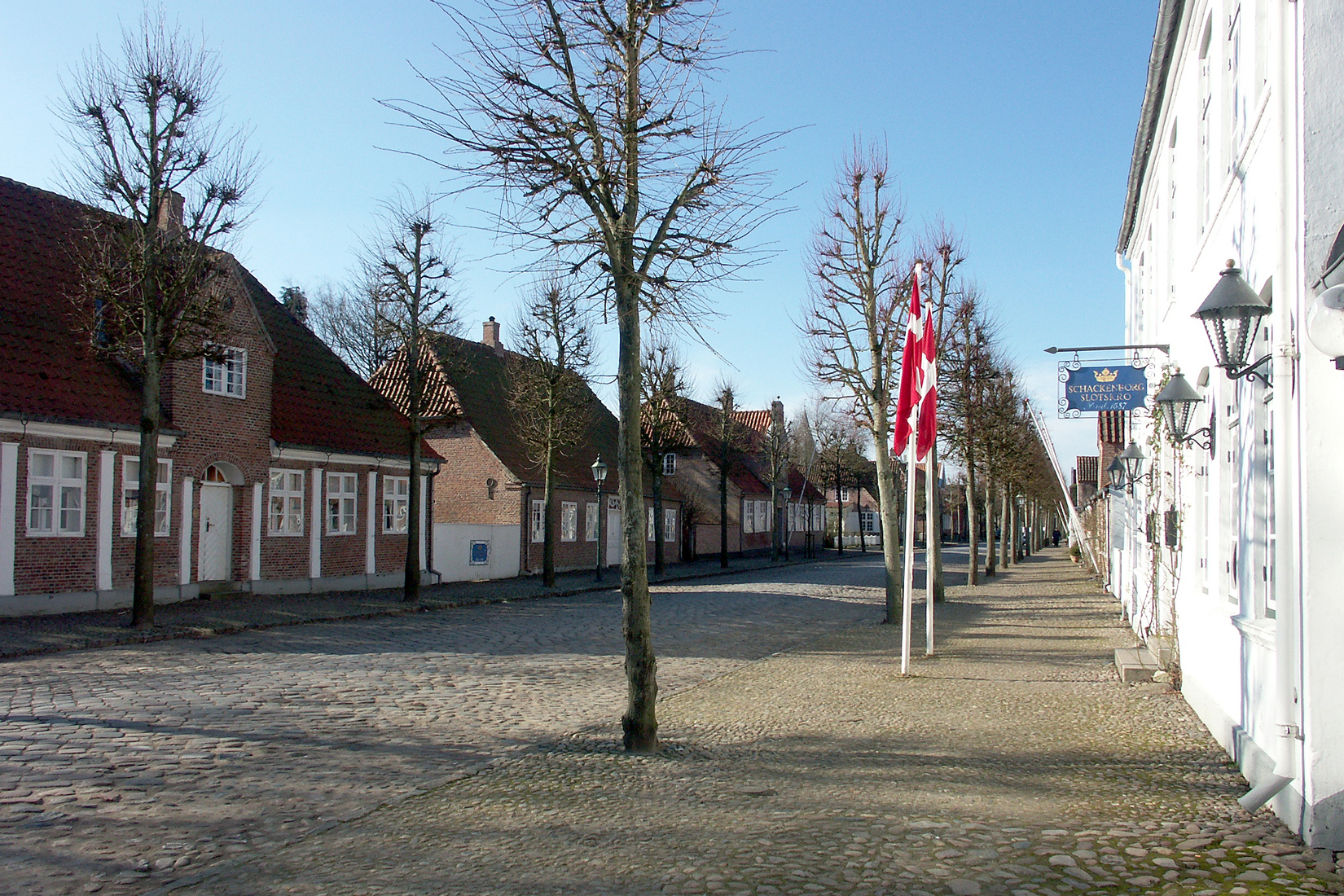
- Slotsgaden (The Castle Street)

- Location in Region of Southern Denmark Møgeltønder (Denmark)
- Coordinates: 54°56′34″N 8°48′6″E
- Country: Denmark
- Region: Southern Denmark
- Municipality: Tønder Municipality

Population (2026)
  - Total: 732
- Time zone: UTC+1 (CET)
  - Summer (DST): UTC+2 (CEST)

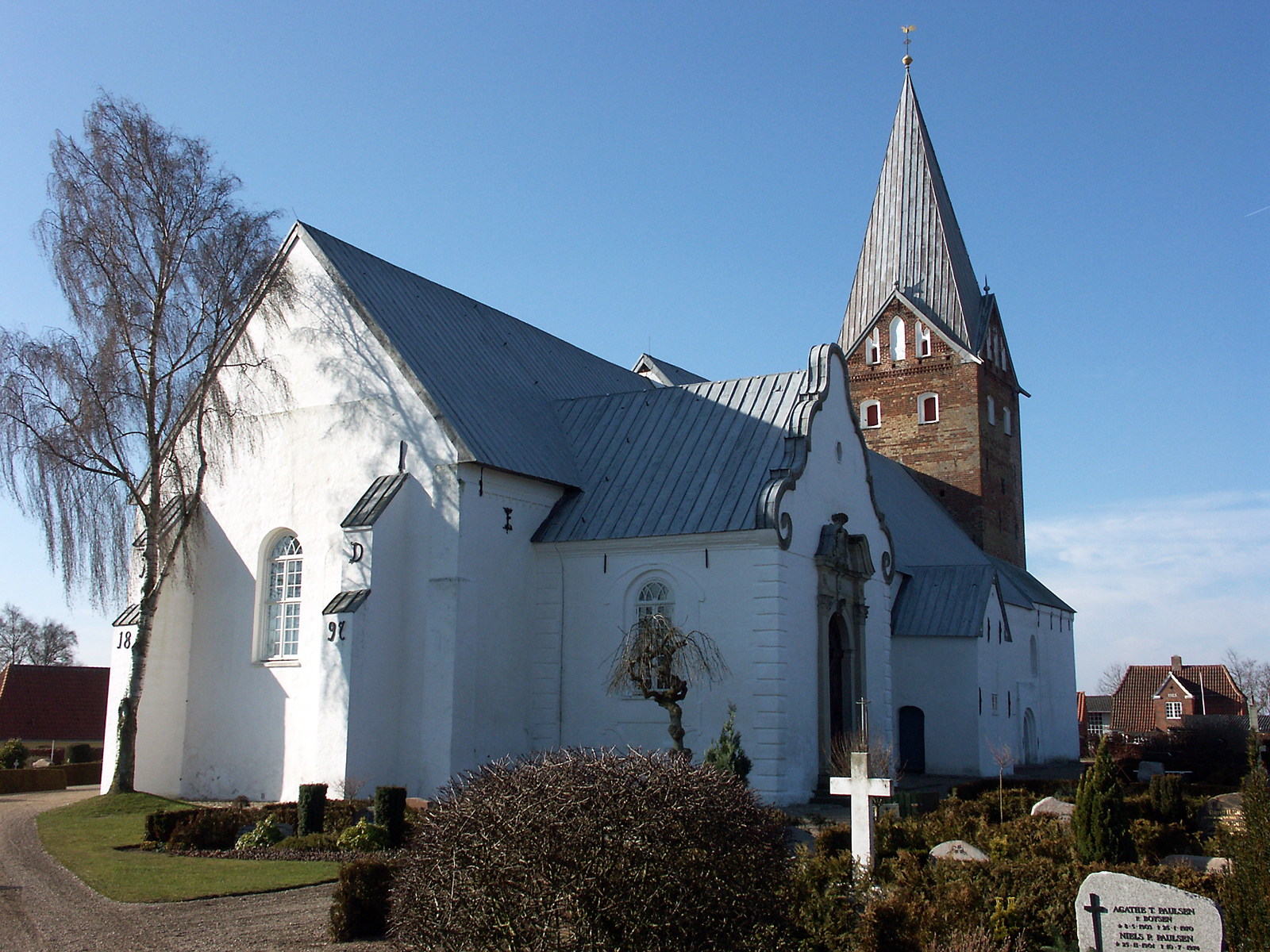
Møgeltønder Church

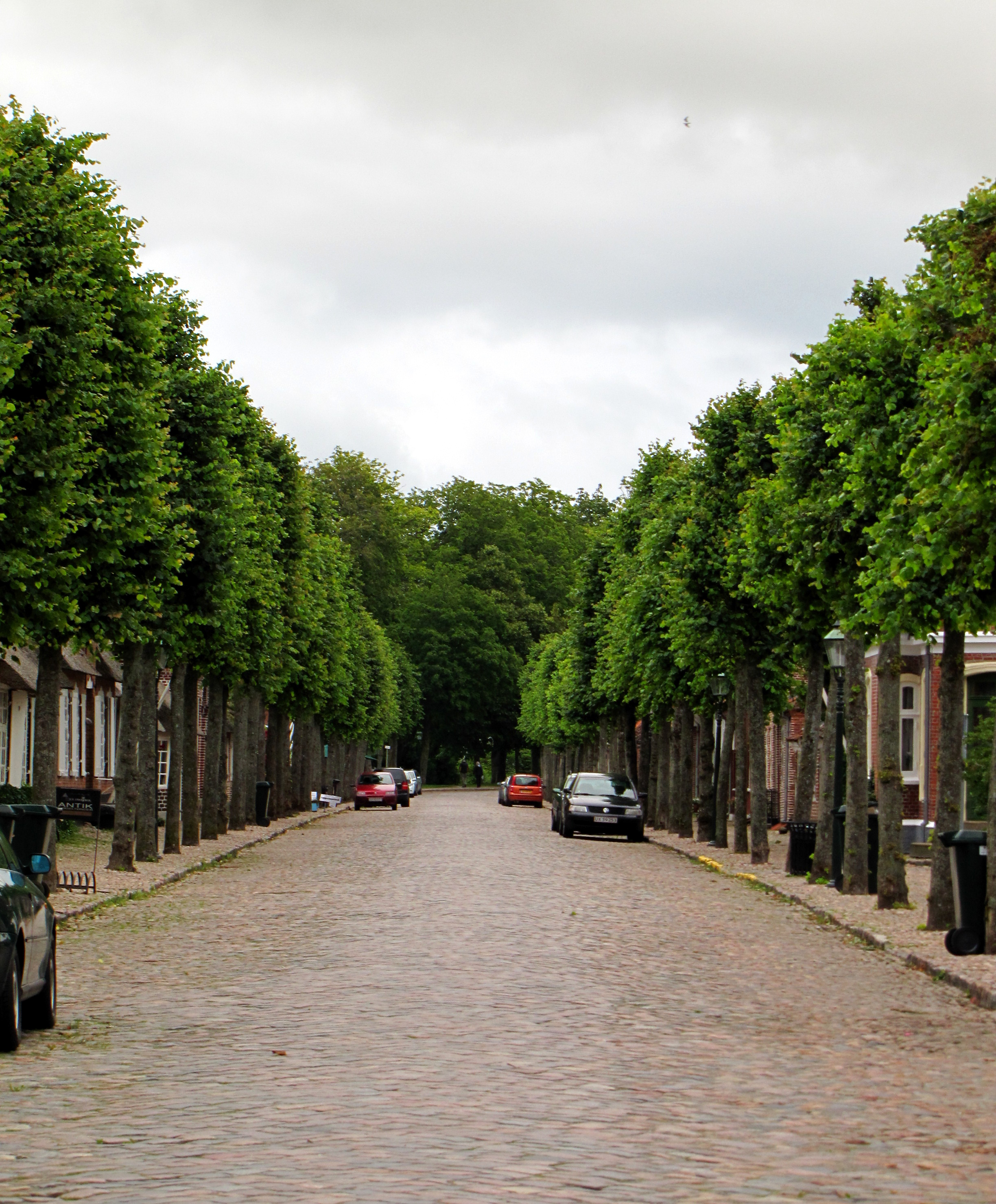
Alley

Møgeltønder (Danish pronunciation: [ˈmøˀjl̩ˌtsʰønˀɐ]) is a small town in Denmark, located in Møgeltønder Parish, Tønder Municipality, in the southwestern corner of the Danish peninsula of Jutland 5 kilometres north of the Danish-German border and 4 kilometres west of Tønder. Møgeltønder is known for its picturesque main street, the large 12th-century church, and Schackenborg Castle. As of 2026, it has a population of 732.

== Møgeltønder Church ==
Møgeltønder Church is one of the largest village churches in southern Jutland. The church was built in c. 1180 but had the nave extended and a larger choir added c1275. The tower with the tall spire was added in the 15th century. The church was owned by the counts Schack of Schackenborg castle from 1661 to 1970, and has a rich interior e.g. a gothic altarpiece from c.1 450, 17th pulpit and pews, and the oldest church organ in Denmark. As a manor church, it shows many references to the Schack family. Apart from the large burial chapel of the Schack family, the medieval murals in the choir were restored and repainted in 1890 to show the faces of the current count and his son.

== Schackenborg Castle ==
Schackenborg Castle was the home to the counts of Schackenborg from 1661 to 1979, who rebuilt and extended the castle. It was subsequently the home of the Danish Queen Margrethe II and Prince Henrik's younger son Prince Joachim until 2014. Prince Joachim and his second wife Princess Marie married at Møgeltønder church on 14 May 2008. Since 2014 the castle has been owned by the Schackenborg fund and has been partially opened to the public.

The castle connects with the old part of Møgeltønder (the houses around the medieval church) through the picturesque newer main street "Slotsgaden" with 18th-century houses, flanked with lime trees. South of the church, the town is a good example of a rural Danish town consisting of farmhouses, dating from the 18th and 19th centuries, where the farms have not been moved out to their fields as was customary all over Denmark in the period 1784-c1830 due to agricultural reforms.

== Edu-Art . Art&Thought ==
The Kunst og Kulturforeningen edu-art is a gallery and a place for communication. It aims on contributing to village life and also to global communication on the unity on arts and science. Founder is the social philosopher Peter Herrmann

== Notable people ==
- Hans Schack, 2nd Count of Schackenborg (1676–1719) a Danish nobleman and enfeoffed count, the second holder of the County of Schackenborg from 1683 to 1719; buried in Møgeltønder church
- Otto Didrik Schack, 3rd Count of Schackenborg (1710–1741) a Danish nobleman and enfeoffed count, the third holder of the County of Schackenborg from 1719 to 1741; buried in Møgeltønder church
- Hans Schack, 4th Count of Schackenborg (1734–1796) a Danish nobleman and enfeoffed count, the fourth holder of the County of Schackenborg from 1741 to 1796; buried in Møgeltønder church
- Svend Wiig Hansen (1922 in Møgeltønder – 1997) a Danish sculptor and painter.
- Freya Clausen (born 1978 in Møgeltønder) a Danish singer/songwriter and TV personality, also known by her mononym Freya

== External references ==
Møgeltønder church's home page

Kunst og Kulturforeningen Edu-Art:Art and Thought
