= Anna Sophie Schack =

Danish noblewoman (1689–1760)

Anna Sophie Schack (4 September 1689 - 28 September 1760), was a Danish noble and landlord.

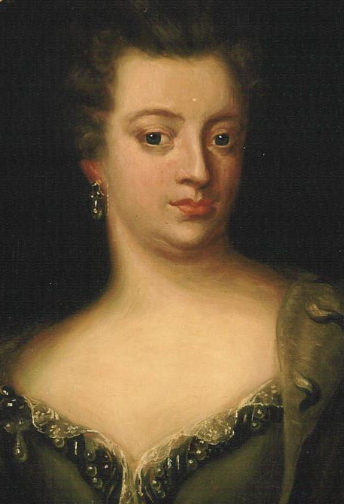
Anna Sophie Schack

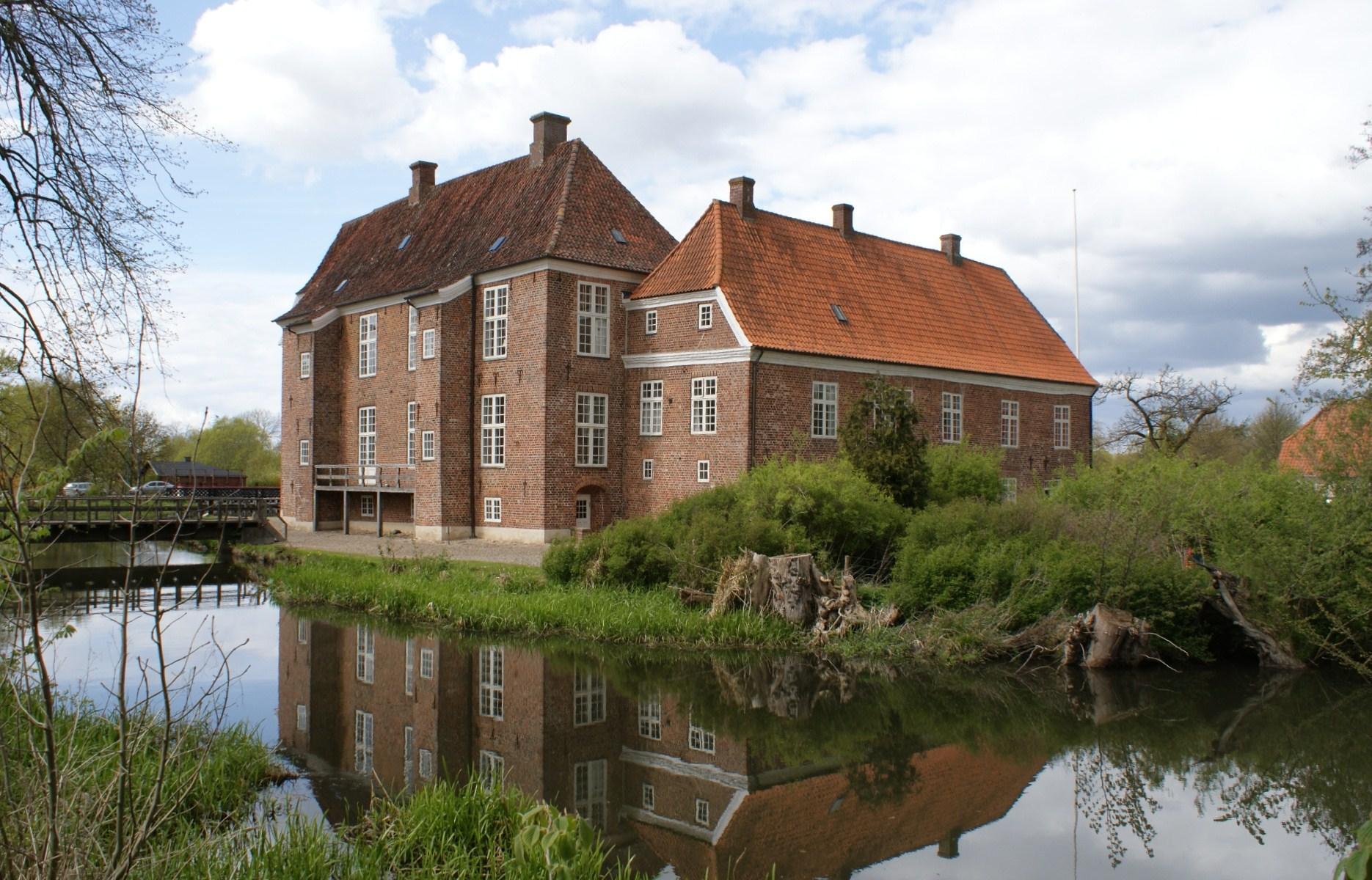
Schloss Gram

== Biography ==
Anna Sophie von Rantzau was born in Hamburg. She was the daughter of secretary and land minister Christian von Rantzau (1649-1704) and Margrethe von Rantzau (1642-1708). She was married in 1711 to Hans Schack, count of the County of Schackenborg. Hans Schack was a widower and had a son and heir, Otto Didrik Schack (1710-1741). Hans Schack died in 1719, and his widow assumed his position as county administrator of Schackenborg. She also became manager of her husband's estate as guardian of her stepson.

Over the years, her activities as landowner became more extensive. At Giesegaard she built a new main building, and at Gram she rebuilt a manor house, Schloss Gram. She increased the manor and estate at Juellund in 1752 and in 1730 she acquired the Nybølgård estate in North Schleswig. The year before she had bought Thotts Palace at Kongens Nytorv in Copenhagen and in 1754 she took over Schack's Palace at Amalienborg. In 1751 she was given the order L´union parfaite.

Her relationship with her stepson, Otto Didrik Schack, was never the best and worsened over the years. In 1741, her step-son died. His heir was his eldest son, Hans Schack (1735-1796). Shortly before her death in 1760, she set up a will in which she completely bypassed Hans Schack in favor of his younger brother Frederik Christian Schack (1736-1790). In 1758, a commission had to be set up to settle the resulting disputes.

Anna Sophie Schack was an energetic estate collector and administrator who often became embroiled in processes with her farmers. This made her very disliked by them and she was referred to as "den onde grevinde" (lit. the evil countess)
