= Freya Clausen =

Freya
- Born: Freya Christine Clausen; 17 November 1978 (age 47); Møgeltønder, Denmark
- Genres: Pop • Alternative Pop

Freya Christine Clausen (born 17 November 1978), also known as Freya, is a Danish singer/songwriter and television personality, based in Copenhagen. She worked as an MTV VJ, then moved to VH1 in 2010. She has released two solo albums, Tea with the Queen and Chasing My Tale.

Since 2010 she has hosted the pan-Scandinavian TV channel Star!'s broadcasts from Stockholm Fashion Week by Berns.

Freya released a new single called "Into The Fire" on 29 September 2014.

== Discography ==
=== Albums ===
- 1999 Tea With The Queen
- 2000 Chasing My Tale
- 2015 Thrills

As a part of Sparkler

- 2003 Magnifying Glass

=== Singles ===
- 1998 "Mr. Opposite"
- 1999 "Yellow Ladybird"
- 1999 "Hallelujah"
- 1999 "It's Already Wednesday"
- 2000 "Rain"
- 2000 "Girlfriend Application"
- 2014 "Into The Fire"
- 2021 "Soften to Believe"
