= Carl Ludwig Jessen =

German painter

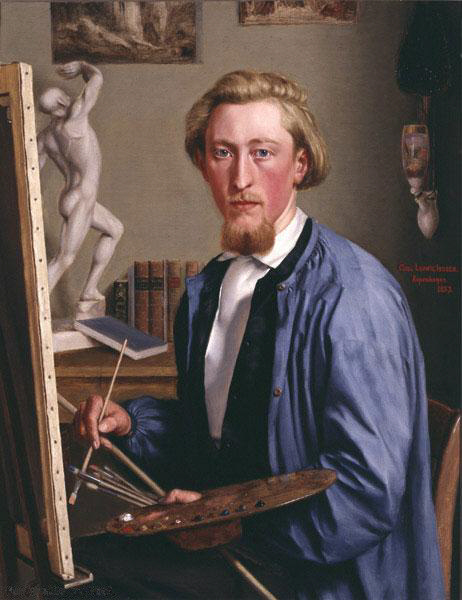
- Carl Ludwig Jessen, self-portrait, 1857
- Born: 22 February 1833; Deezbüll, Duchy of Schleswig, Denmark
- Died: 4 January 1917 (aged 83); Deezbüll, Schleswig-Holstein, Germany
- Education: Royal Danish Academy of Fine Arts: Wilhelm Marstrand
- Known for: Painting
- Movement: Naïve art (early works), Naturalism
- Patrons: Countess Schackenborg

Carl Ludwig Jessen (22 February 1833 – 4 January 1917) was a North Frisian painter. Today he is known as the "Frisian painter" (German: Friesenmaler and Danish: frisermaler) in Denmark and Germany. As a Naturalist painter he is notable for depicting the contemporary rural life of his native area.

After a sponsored education in Copenhagen, Paris and Rome, Jessen returned to North Frisia where he lived off his paintings. Although one of the key figures in Danish and Northern German arts and notable for his accurate and detailed style, he has been blamed for idealising rural life.

== Life ==
Jessen was born in Deezbüll, now a part of Niebüll, in 1833. After an apprenticeship as a carpenter he used to work as a decorator on farmsteads in the marshlands of North Frisia. Between 1848 and 1854 he began as a self-educated portrait-painter. In 1853 he quit the carpenter's business and focused exclusively on painting. From 1856 to 1865 he studied at the Royal Danish Academy of Fine Arts in Copenhagen in Wilhelm Marstrand's class with a scholarship granted by a wealthy pastor, a landowner from Vester Gammelby (now a part of Tønder Municipality in Denmark) and by the Countess Schackenborg. Through Marstrand and fellow painters, Jessen was influenced by Høyen's idea of painting Danish national history and tradition.

When Denmark lost the duchies of Schleswig and Holstein to Prussia and Austria in 1865 after the Treaty of Vienna (1864) ended the Second Schleswig War, Jessen returned to North Frisia. A scholarship by the state of Prussia enabled him to travel to Paris and Rome in 1867 and 1868. During 1869/70 he lived in Klockries near Risum. According to his nephew Momme Nissen, he later lived in Hamburg from 1871 to 1875, but it has been suggested that Jessen only stayed there from 1875 to 1876. Then he returned to Deezbüll where he lived from portraits and idealised homeland paintings in the style he learned in Copenhagen.

In 1893 he married Martha Elisabeth Benecke from Hamburg. Contrary to Jessen's rural paintings, the couple built a modern house which was still atypical for the area. Claassen notes that Jessen's social career in North Frisia predated his reputation as a painter, since he held many honorary appointments. In 1910, aged 77, Jessen was granted an honorific professorial title from University of Kiel. He died in Deezbüll in 1917.

== Reception ==
Carl Ludwig Jessen's work has been seen as central in the history of the arts of Denmark and Northern Germany. His paintings have captured the traditions and daily life of the North Frisian community with the distinct accuracy of Naturalism. He has thus been called a chronicler of North Frisia.

Jessen's reputation as a painter of idealised Frisian home country motives was promoted by his nephew Momme Nissen who was also a painter and a friend of conservative critic Julius Langbehn. In 1913 Nissen published a portfolio with 24 of his uncle's paintings which he called Nordfriesische Heimatkunst (North Frisian Homeland Art).

Later critics were more differential in their approach, such as a 1918 review that notes the documentary part of Jessen works but mentions that the paintings lacked ever more in quality the harder Jessen tried to portray a specifically Frisian aspect. Schlee writes that Jessen due to his solid and crafty painting was particularly suited to accurately depict rural life but mentioned also that his works were always slightly idealised imaginations of the "good old days". This idea is supported by Clausen who writes that Jessen only painted the nice aspects of countryside life but almost completely ignored depictions of hard labour. Kaufmann observed that Jessen lost his originally naïve style of painting during his academic education.

== Selected works ==
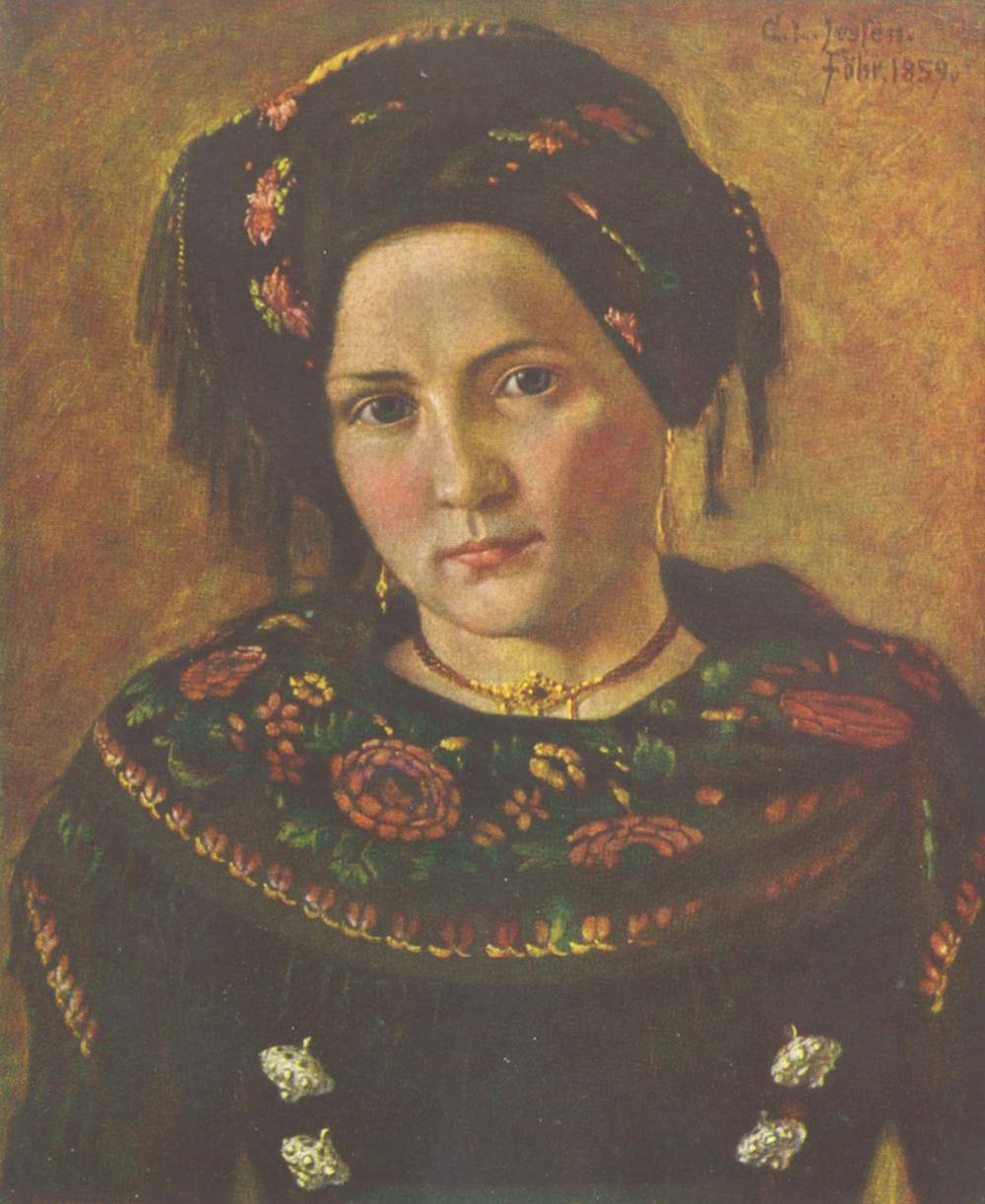
Young Woman, Föhr, 1859

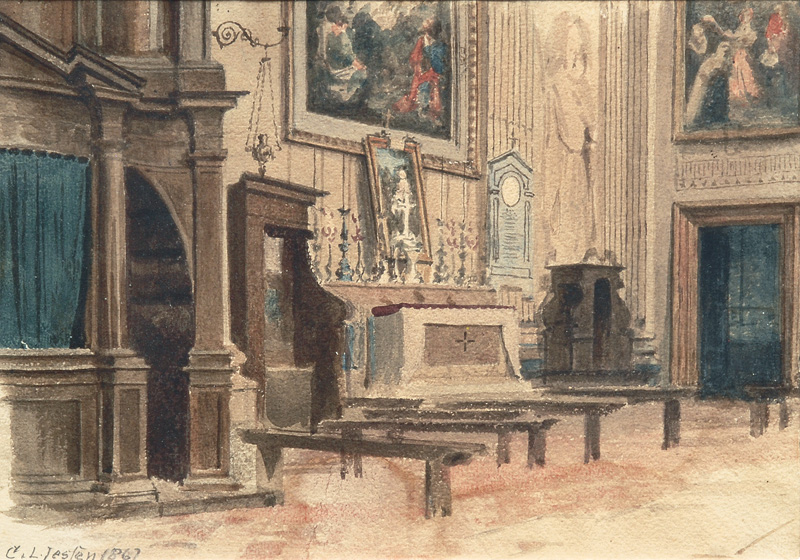
Italy, interior of a Roman church, 1867

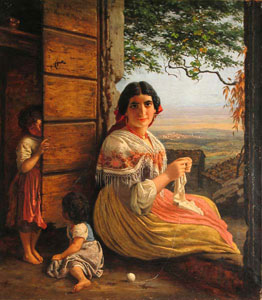
A Knitting Italian Woman, 1868

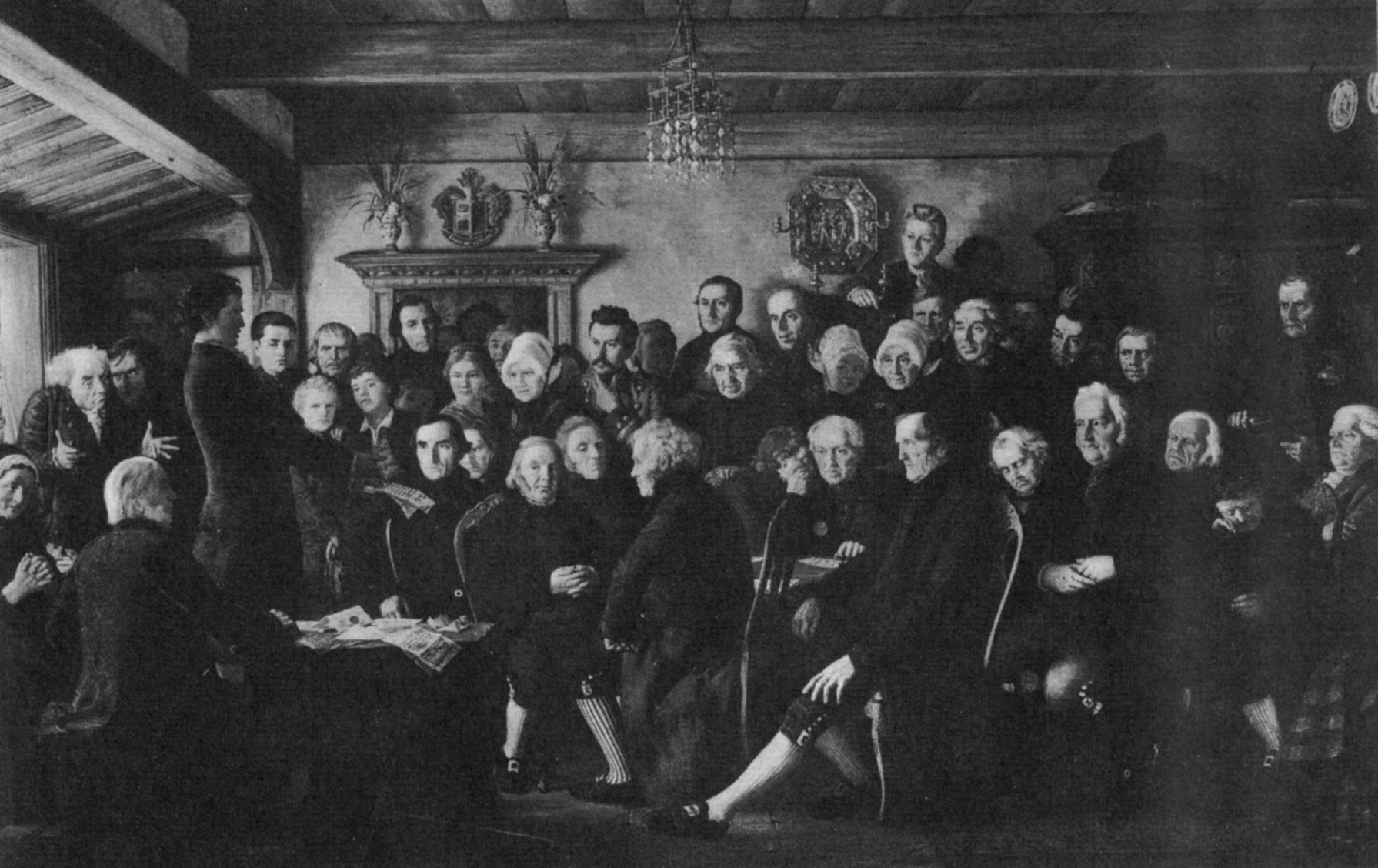
Frisian Thing Assembly, 1875

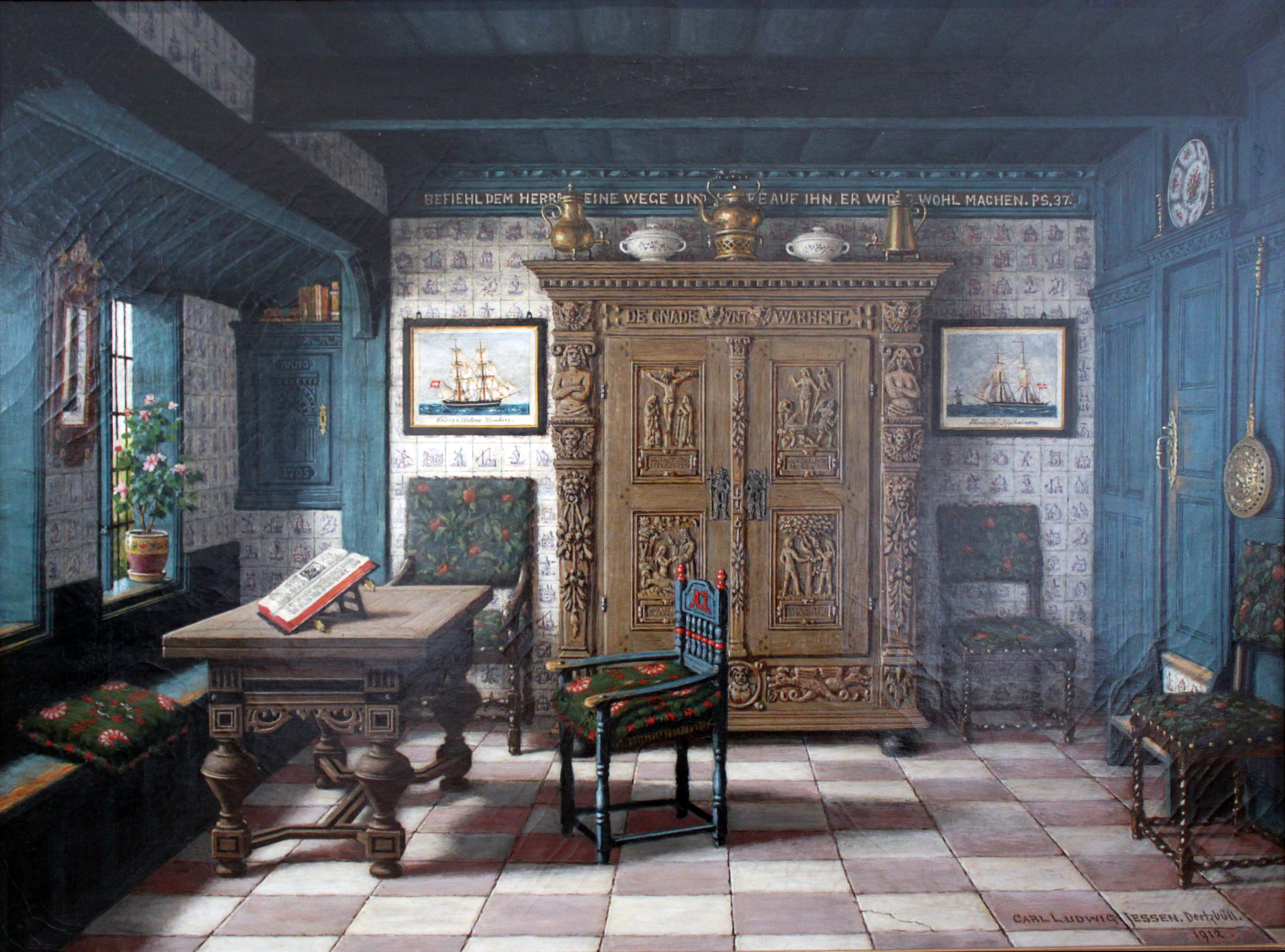
The Blue Living Room, 1912
