= Otto Didrik Schack, 1st Count of Schackenborg =

Otto Didrik Schack
- Count of Schackenborg

Count of Schackenborg
- Tenure: 23 June 1676 to his death on 1 July 1683
- Predecessor: New creation
- Successor: Hans Schack
- Full name: Otto Didrik Schack
- Born: 21 September 1652; Kiel, Duchy of Holstein
- Died: 1 July 1683 (aged 30); Itzehoe, Duchy of Holstein
- Buried: Trinitatis Church, Copenhagen, Kingdom of Denmark
- Noble family: Schack
- Spouses: Magdalene Rantzau; Sophie Dorothea von Marschalck
- Issue Detail: Christian Schack; Hans Schack, 2nd Count of Schackenborg; Johan Frederik Schack; Charlotte Amalie Schack; Bertram Schack; Ulrik Frederik Schack
- Father: Hans Schack
- Mother: Anna Blome

Otto Didrik Schack, Count of Schackenborg (21 September 1652 – 1 July 1683) was a Danish nobleman and feudal count (Danish: lensgreve). He was the first holder of the Countship of Schackenborg from 1676 to 1683.

== Biography ==
Otto Didrik Schack was born on 21 September 1652 in Kiel in the Duchy of Holstein. Born into the noble family of Schack, he was the third child and eldest son of the Danish field marshal and privy councillor Hans Schack, and his wife Anna Blome.

In 1667, he was made a hofjunker at the Danish court. From 1670 to 1671 he was educated at the knight academy in Saumur that prepared aristocratic youth for state and military service, and in 1671, he was made a kammerjunker at the Danish court. In 1674 he was appointed amtmann of the Amt of Riberhus, and on 14 June the same year he was awarded the Order of the Dannebrog.

At the death of his father in 1676, he inherited the large manors of Schackenborg and Gram in Southern Jutland, and Gisselfeld in Zealand. Later in the same year, on 23 June 1676, he was awarded the title of feudal count (Danish: lensgreve), as the Countship of Schackenborg was created from the manors of Schackenborg, Sødamgård, Solvig, and Store Tønde.

Count Schack died already on 1 July 1683, aged only 30, in Itzehoe in the Duchy of Holstein. He was succeeded by his eldest surviving son, Hans Schack.

== Family ==
Schack married firstly in 1671 Magdalene Rantzau, daughter of Bertram Rantzau and Dorothea Brockdorff. She died in labour the following year, giving birth to a still-born child.

Schack married secondly on 26 April 1674 Sophie Dorothea von Marschalck, daughter of Johann Friedrich von Marschalck and Margrethe Bielke, by whom he had 6 children:

- Baron Christian Schack (1675–1676)
- Hans Schack, who succeeded him as 2nd Count of Schackenborg.
- Baron Johan Frederik Schack (1677–1690)
- Baroness Charlotte Amalie Schack (1678–1690)
- Baron Bertram Schack (1679–1728), who married Elisabeth Augusta von Arenstorff. They had 4 children.
- Baron Ulrik Frederik Schack (1681–1742), who married Sophie Amalie Giedde. They had 5 children.

== Notes and references ==
=== Bibliography ===
- Danmarks Adels Aarbog 1932 (PDF). Copenhagen: J.H. Schultz. 1932.

Danish nobility
New creation	Count of Schackenborg; 1676–1683	Succeeded by Hans Schack
