= Otto Didrik Schack, 5th Count of Schackenborg =

Danish nobleman

Otto Didrik Schack
- Count of Schackenborg

Count of Schackenborg
- Tenure: 21 August 1796 – 18 August 1809
- Predecessor: Hans Schack
- Successor: Hans Schack
- Full name: Otto Didrik Schack
- Born: 10 April 1758; Copenhagen, Kingdom of Denmark
- Died: 18 August 1809 (aged 51); Itzehoe, Duchy of Holstein
- Noble family: Schack
- Spouse: Amalie Magdalene Christiane Caroline von Krogh
- Issue Detail: Juliane Catharine Elisabeth Schack; Hans Schack, 6th Count of Schackenborg; Auguste Ulrikke Christiane Frederikke Schack; Frederikke Juliane Adamine Schack
- Father: Hans Schack, 4th Count of Schackenborg
- Mother: Ulrikke Augusta Vilhelmine Moltke

Otto Didrik Schack, Count of Schackenborg (10 April 1758 – 18 August 1809) was a Danish aristocrat and officer. He was the fifth holder of the Countship of Schackenborg from 1796 to 1809 with the title of enfeoffed count (Danish: lensgreve).

== Biography ==
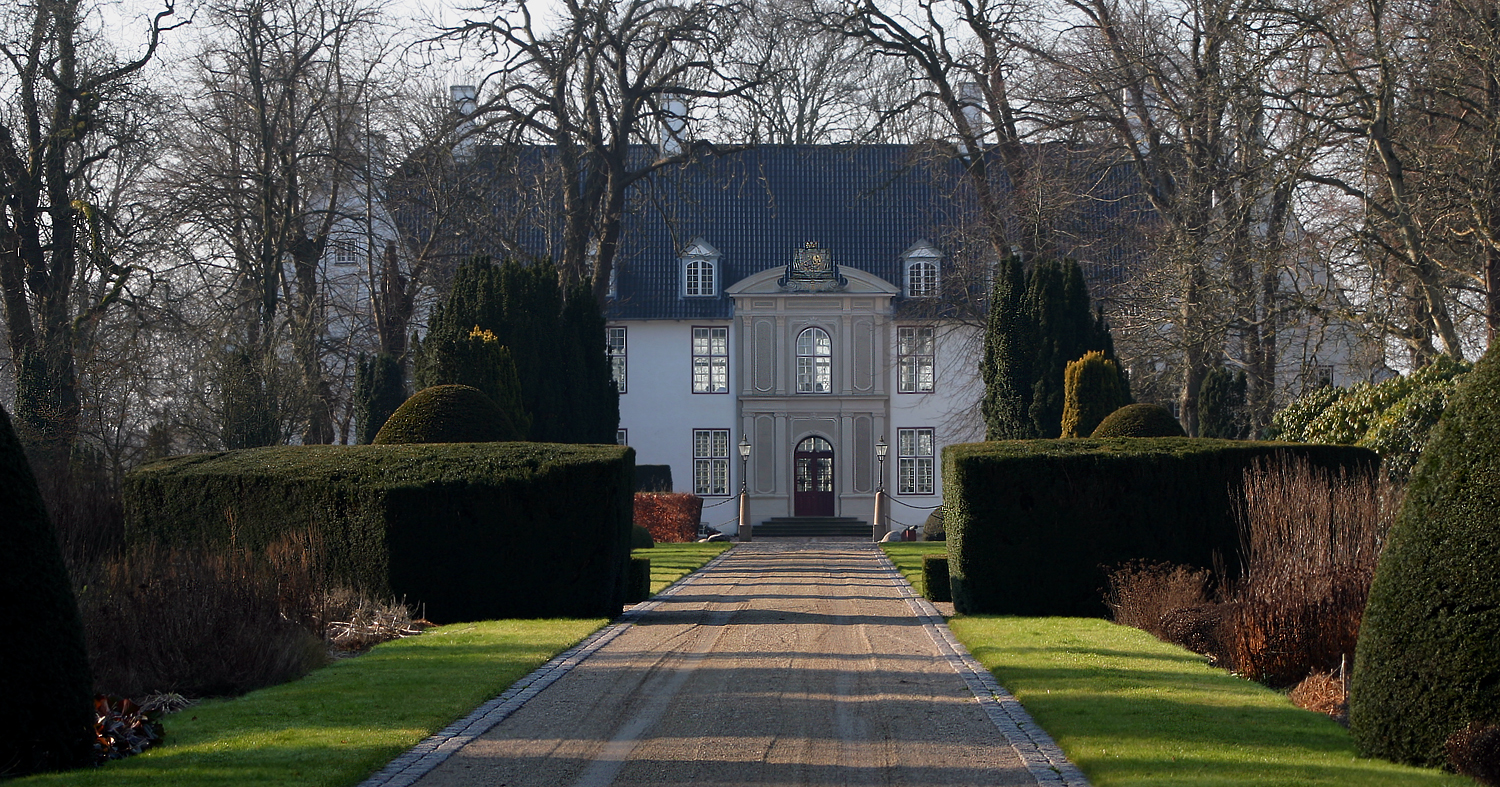
Schackenborg Castle, photographed in 2006.

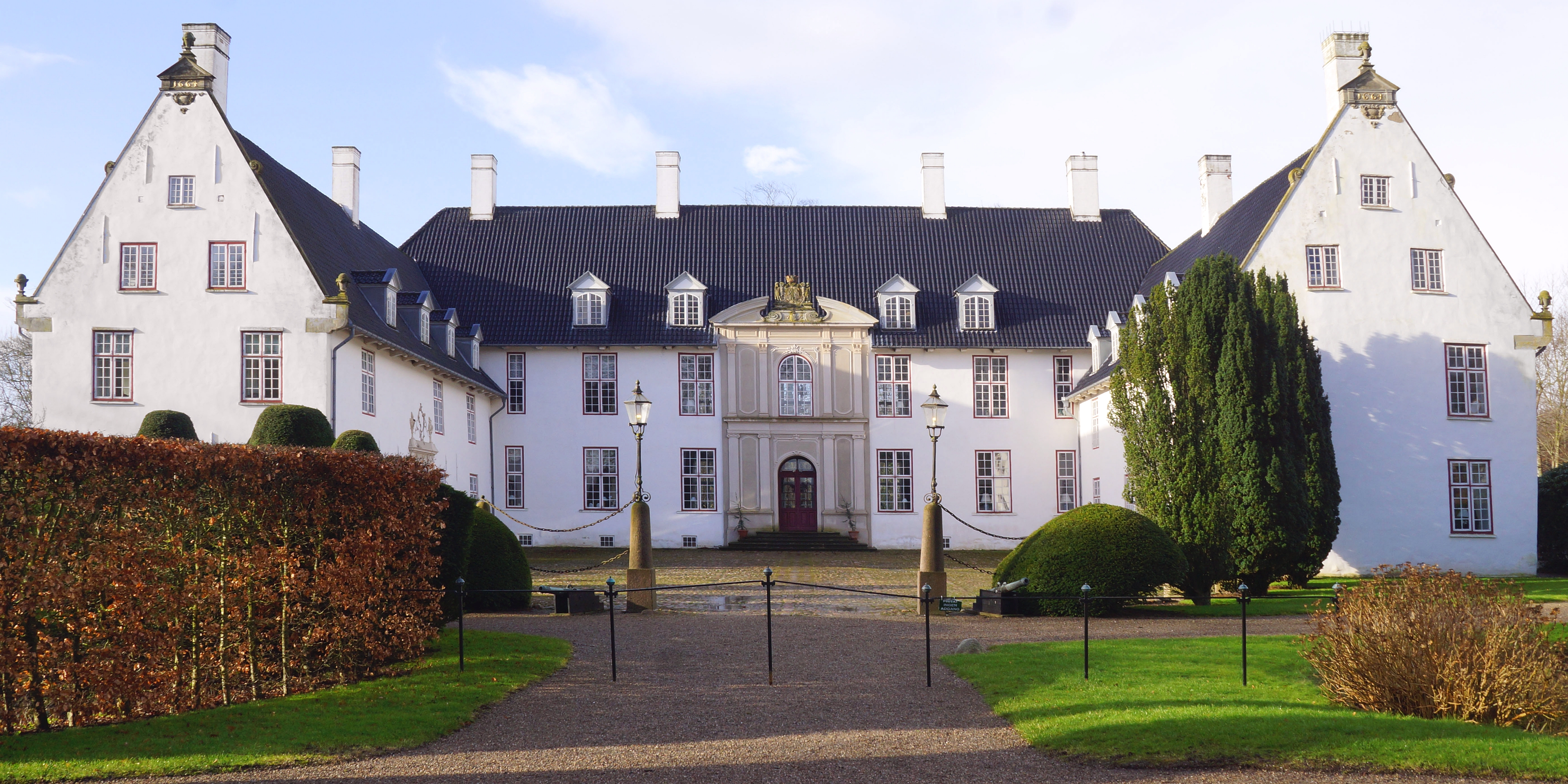
Schackenborg Castle, front from east side (2023)

Otto Didrik Schack was born on 10 April 1758 in Copenhagen in the Kingdom of Denmark. Born into the noble family of Schack, he was the eldest child of the Danish nobleman and civil servant Hans Schack, and his first wife Ulrikke Augusta Vilhelmine Moltke, a daughter of Danish courtier, statesman and diplomat Count Adam Gottlob Moltke.

In 1774, Count Schack was appointed captain à la suite in the Danish Life Regiment. From 1774 to 1776, he studied at Sorø Academy. In 1779, he joined the Falster Infantry Regiment, and became a company commandor in 1781. In 1783, he was appointed chamberlain. In 1786, he was appointed major in the Kronborg battalion of the Life regiment, in 1787 he was appointed commander of the Jaeger Corps of Zealand, in 1791 lieutenant colonel, in 1803 colonel, and on 12 June of the same year, he was awarded the order of the Dannebrog and became chief of the Jaeger Corps of Zealand. At the death of his father on 21 August 1796, he inherited the Countship of Schackenborg and assumed the title of enfeoffed count. He retired in 1808 as a major general.

Count Schack died on 18 August 1809, aged 51, at Itzehoe in the Duchy of Holstein. He was succeeded by his eldest surviving son, Hans Schack.

== Family ==
Count Schack married on 30 July 1783 in Horsens Amalie Magdalene Christiane Caroline von Krogh, daughter of Dano-Norwegian officer Casper Herman von Krogh and Christiane Ulrikke Lerche, by whom he had four children. She died on 31 July 1830 in Preetz.

- Countess Juliane Catharine Elisabeth Schack (1784–1843)
- Hans Schack, who succeeded him as 6th Count of Schackenborg.
- Countess Auguste Ulrikke Christiane Frederikke Schack (1787–1841)
- Countess Frederikke Juliane Adamine Schack (1788–1864)

== Notes and references ==
=== Bibliography ===
- Danmarks Adels Aarbog 1932 (PDF). Copenhagen: J.H. Schultz. 1932.

Danish nobility
Preceded by Hans Schack	Count of Schackenborg; 1796–1809	Succeeded by Hans Schack
