= Hans Schack, 2nd Count of Schackenborg =

Danish nobleman

Hans Schack
- Count of Schackenborg

Count of Schackenborg
- Tenure: 1 July 1683 – 22 September 1719
- Predecessor: Otto Didrik Schack
- Successor: Otto Didrik Schack
- Full name: Hans Schack
- Born: 4 March 1676; Ribe, Kingdom of Denmark
- Died: 22 September 1719 (aged 43); Copenhagen, Kingdom of Denmark
- Buried: Møgeltønder Church, Møgeltønder, Kingdom of Denmark
- Noble family: Schack
- Spouses: Anna Margrethe Reventlow; Anna Sophie Rantzau
- Issue Detail: Frederik August Schack; Louise Schack; Conrad Schack; Otto Didrik Schack, 3rd Count of Schackenborg; Anna Margrethe Schack
- Father: Otto Didrik Schack, 1st Count of Schackenborg
- Mother: Sophie Dorothea von Marschalk

Hans Schack, Count of Schackenborg (4 March 1676 – 22 September 1719) was a Danish nobleman and enfeoffed count (Danish: lensgreve). He was the second holder of the Countship of Schackenborg from 1683 to 1719.

== Biography ==
Hans Schack was born on 4 March 1676 in Ribe in the Kingdom of Denmark. Born into the noble family of Schack, he was the second child and eldest surviving son of the Danish nobleman and civil servant Otto Didrik Schack, and his second wife Sophie Dorothea von Marschalk.

At the death of his grandfather in February 1676, his father had inherited the large manors of Schackenborg and Gram in Southern Jutland, and Gisselfeld in Zealand. Later in the same year, on 23 June 1676, Otto Didrik Schack was awarded the title of enfeoffed count (Danish: lensgreve), as the Countship of Schackenborg was created from the manors of Schackenborg, Sødamgård, Solvig, and Store Tønde.

On 1 July 1683, when Hans Schack was just seven years old, his father died. At the death of his father, he inherited the Countship of Schackenborg and assumed the title of enfeoffed count. Due to his age, his mother assumed the administration of Schackenborg until he came of age. From 1692 he was educated at the knight academy in Copenhagen that prepared aristocratic youth for state and military service, and in 1695, he was made a chamberlain at the Danish court.

On 19 October 1697, he was appointed amtmann of the Amt of Riberhus, and on 15 August the following year, he was awarded the Order of the Dannebrog. He does not seem to have dealt much with the affairs of his office of amtmann, as he usually stayed on his estates or in the capital, and in 1707 he was allowed to keep the salary of his office of amtmann in return for employing a manager of the office.

In 1702, he entered into French military service. As such he participated in the Battle of Blenheim in 1704 during the War of the Spanish Succession. During the military service, he lost an arm in battle and was later nicknamed the Silver Arm, since he was given a prosthetic arm made of silver. On 22 July 1712, he was made a Geheimrat in the privy council, and on 26 October 1716 he was awarded the Order of the Elephant.

Count Schack was appointed finance deputy in 1719. However, he died already on 22 September the same year, aged only 43, in Copenhagen in the Kingdom of Denmark. He was succeeded as count of Schackenborg by his eldest surviving son, Otto Didrik Schack.

== Family ==
Schack married firstly on 16 March 1699 in the chapel of Christiansborg Palace Countess Anne Margrethe Reventlow, daughter of Grand Chancellor Count Conrad von Reventlow and Sophie Amalie von Hahn, by whom he had four children. She died on 21 March 1710.

- Count Frederik August Schack (1707–1707)
- Baroness Louise Schack (1707–1707)
- Count Conrad Schack (1708–1709)
- Otto Didrik Schack, who succeeded him as 3rd Count of Schackenborg.

Schack married secondly in 1711 in Hamburg Anna Sophie Rantzau, daughter of Christian von Rantzau and Margrethe Rantzau, by whom he had one child:

- Baroness Anne Margrethe Schack (1713–1720)

== Notes and references ==
=== Bibliography ===
- Danmarks Adels Aarbog 1932 (PDF). Copenhagen: J.H. Schultz. 1932.
- Bobé, Louis (1901). "Schack, Hans Greve". In Bricka, Carl Frederik (ed.). Dansk biografisk Lexikon, tillige omfattende Norge for tidsrummet 1537-1814 (in Danish). Vol. XV (1st ed.). Copenhagen: Gyldendalske Boghandels Forlag. p. 27.

Danish nobility
Preceded by Otto Didrik Schack	Count of Schackenborg; 1683–1719	Succeeded by Otto Didrik Schack
