= Sarah Schaack =

Geneticist

Sarah Schaack is an evolutionary geneticist and professor at Reed College in Portland, Oregon.

In 2013–2014, Schaack did field work in east Africa as a Fulbright Scholar. In 2016 Schaack received the inaugural Lynwood W. Swanson Promise for Scientific Research Award from the M.J. Murdock Charitable Trust.

In mid-2026, she has an h-index of 29.

== Early life and education ==
She attended Earlham College, University of Florida and earned a Ph.D. at the Indiana University Bloomington.
