= Seekamp =

Seekamp is a surname of German origin.

The Seekamp name dates back to November 25, 1481. That Friday, Heinrich Clüver sold a piece of land near Bollen known as the Seekampswerder to the church, who in turn leased the land to two brothers: Hinrich and Brüne. They didn't have a surname yet. But thanks to the lease, they became known as Hinrich Seekamp and Brüne Seekamp.

Werder are small, cultivated pieces of land, on a river, which become rich and fertile over time through the ebb and flow of river floods. The Seekamp name is formed from German See meaning 'lake', and kamp, a Low German word meaning 'enclosed, fenced, or hedged piece of land', which in turn comes from the Latin word campus meaning 'plain'. So a Seekamp, in the literal meaning of the word, is a lake-field.

By the early 1700s, descendants of Hinrich Seekamp and his brother had become established families in the surrounding villages: Bollen, Uphusen, Bierden, Mahndorf, Embsen, and the towns of Achim and Arbergen. The Seekamp name had become one of the more common family names in the area.

Notable people with the surname include:

- Clara Seekamp (1819–1908), Australian journalist
- Frederick Francis Seekamp (born c. 1795), English merchant, mayor of Ipswich 1836–7
- Henry Seekamp (1829–1864), Australian journalist
- Nicole Seekamp (born 1992), Australian basketball player
