= Otto Didrik Schack, 3rd Count of Schackenborg =

Danish nobleman

Otto Didrik Schack
- Count of Schackenborg
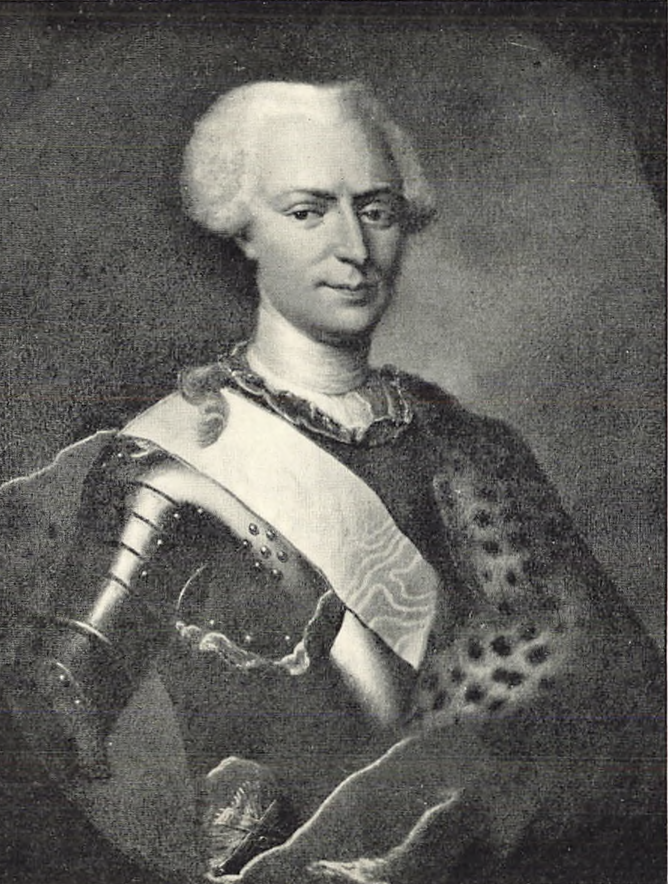

Count of Schackenborg
- Tenure: 22 September 1719 – 7 October 1741
- Predecessor: Hans Schack
- Successor: Hans Schack
- Full name: Otto Didrik Schack
- Born: 19 March 1710; Gram Castle, Gram, Duchy of Schleswig
- Died: 7 October 1741 (aged 31); Ballum, Kingdom of Denmark
- Buried: Møgeltønder Church, Møgeltønder, Kingdom of Denmark
- Noble family: Schack
- Spouse: Anna Ernestine Frederikke Vilhelmine Gabel
- Issue Detail: Anna Margarethe Schack; Anna Sophie Schack; Hans Schack, 4th Count of Schackenborg; Frederik Christian Schack; Anna Margarethe Schack; Frederikke Anna Sophie Schack
- Father: Hans Schack, 2nd Count of Schackenborg
- Mother: Anna Margrethe Reventlow

Otto Didrik Schack, Count of Schackenborg (19 March 1710 – 7 October 1741) was a Danish nobleman and enfeoffed count (Danish: lensgreve). He was the third holder of the Countship of Schackenborg from 1719 to 1741.

== Biography ==
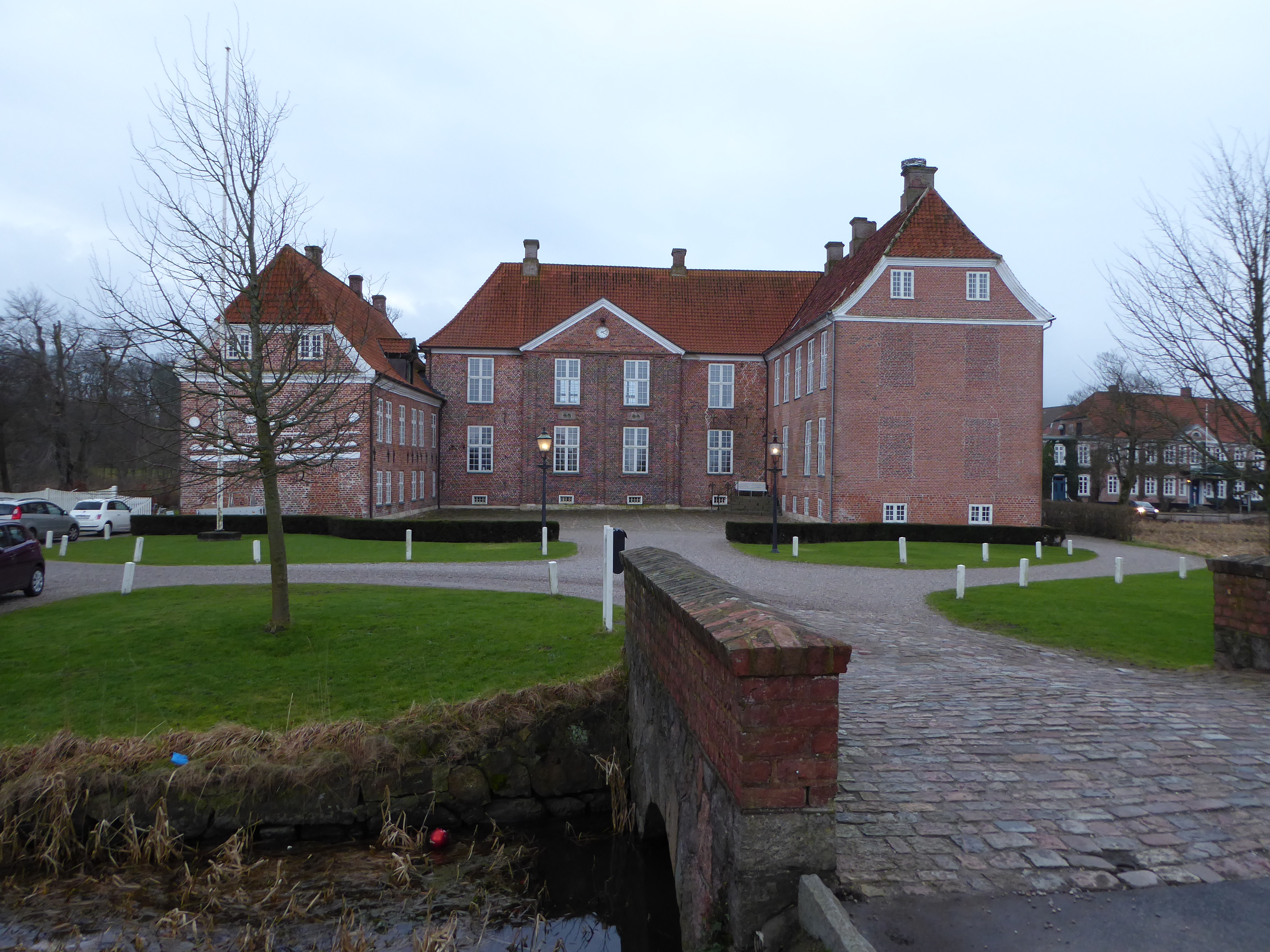
Gram Castle, photographed in 2016.

Otto Didrik Schack was born on 19 March 1710 at Gram Castle in Gram in the Duchy of Schleswig. Born into the noble family of Schack, he was the fifth child and eldest surviving son of the Danish nobleman and civil servant Hans Schack, and his first wife Anna Margrethe Reventlow.

At the early death of his father on 22 September 1719, he inherited the Countship of Schackenborg and assumed the title of enfeoffed count. Due to his young age, his stepmother dowager countess Anna Sophie Schack assumed the position as county administrator of Schackenborg and became manager of her late husband's estate as guardian of her stepson. In 1725, Count Schack was made a chamberlain at the Danish court, and in 1735 he was appointed assessor. On 27 November the following year, he was awarded the Order of the Dannebrog.

Count Schack died already on 7 October 1741, aged only 31, in Ballum in the Kingdom of Denmark. He was succeeded by his eldest surviving son, Hans Schack.

== Family ==
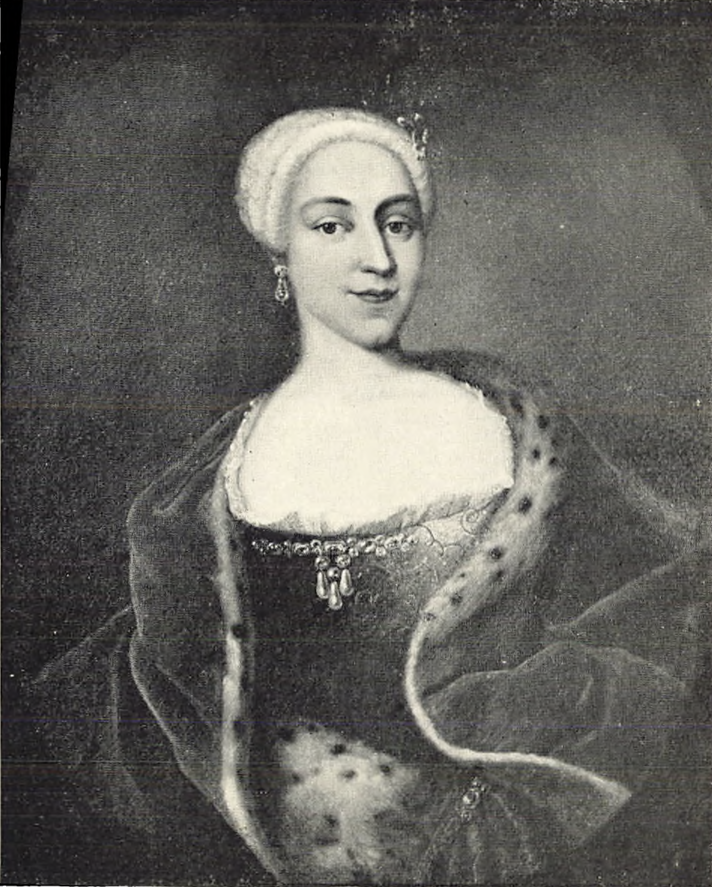
Anna Ernestine Frederikke Vilhelmine Gabel, lensgrevinde.

Schack married on 11 July 1731 at Seekamp Anna Ernestine Frederikke Vilhelmine Gabel, daughter of Oberberghauptmann Frederik Vilhelm Gabel and Anna Maria Triitzschler, by whom he had six children. She died on 20 March 1748.

- Baroness Anne Margrethe Schack (1733–1733)
- Baroness Anna Sophie Schack (1734–1802)
- Hans Schack, who succeeded him as 4th Count of Schackenborg.
- Count Frederik Christian Schack (1736–1790)
- Baroness Anne Margrethe Schack (1739–1739)
- Baroness Frederikke Anna Sophie Schack (1741–1787)

== Notes and references ==
=== Bibliography ===
- Danmarks Adels Aarbog 1932 (PDF). Copenhagen: J.H. Schultz. 1932.

Danish nobility
Preceded by Hans Schack	Count of Schackenborg; 1719–1741	Succeeded by Hans Schack
