= Hans Schack, 6th Count of Schackenborg =

Danish nobleman

Hans Schack
- 6th Count of Schackenborg

Count of Schackenborg
- Tenure: 18 August 1809 – 4 April 1814
- Predecessor: Otto Didrik Schack
- Successor: Otto Didrik Schack
- Full name: Hans Schack
- Born: 6 May 1786; Copenhagen, Kingdom of Denmark
- Died: 4 April 1814 (aged 27); Copenhagen, Kingdom of Denmark
- Noble family: Schack
- Spouse: Countess Louise Frederikke Lerche
- Issue Detail: Otto Didrik Schack, 7th Count of Schackenborg; Countess Sophie Schack; stillborn daughter
- Father: Otto Didrik Schack, 5th Count of Schackenborg
- Mother: Amalie Magdalene Christiane Caroline von Krogh

Hans Schack, Count of Schackenborg (6 May 1786 – 4 April 1814) was a Danish aristocrat. He was the sixth holder of the Countship of Schackenborg from 1809 to 1814 with the title of enfeoffed count (Danish: lensgreve).

== Biography ==
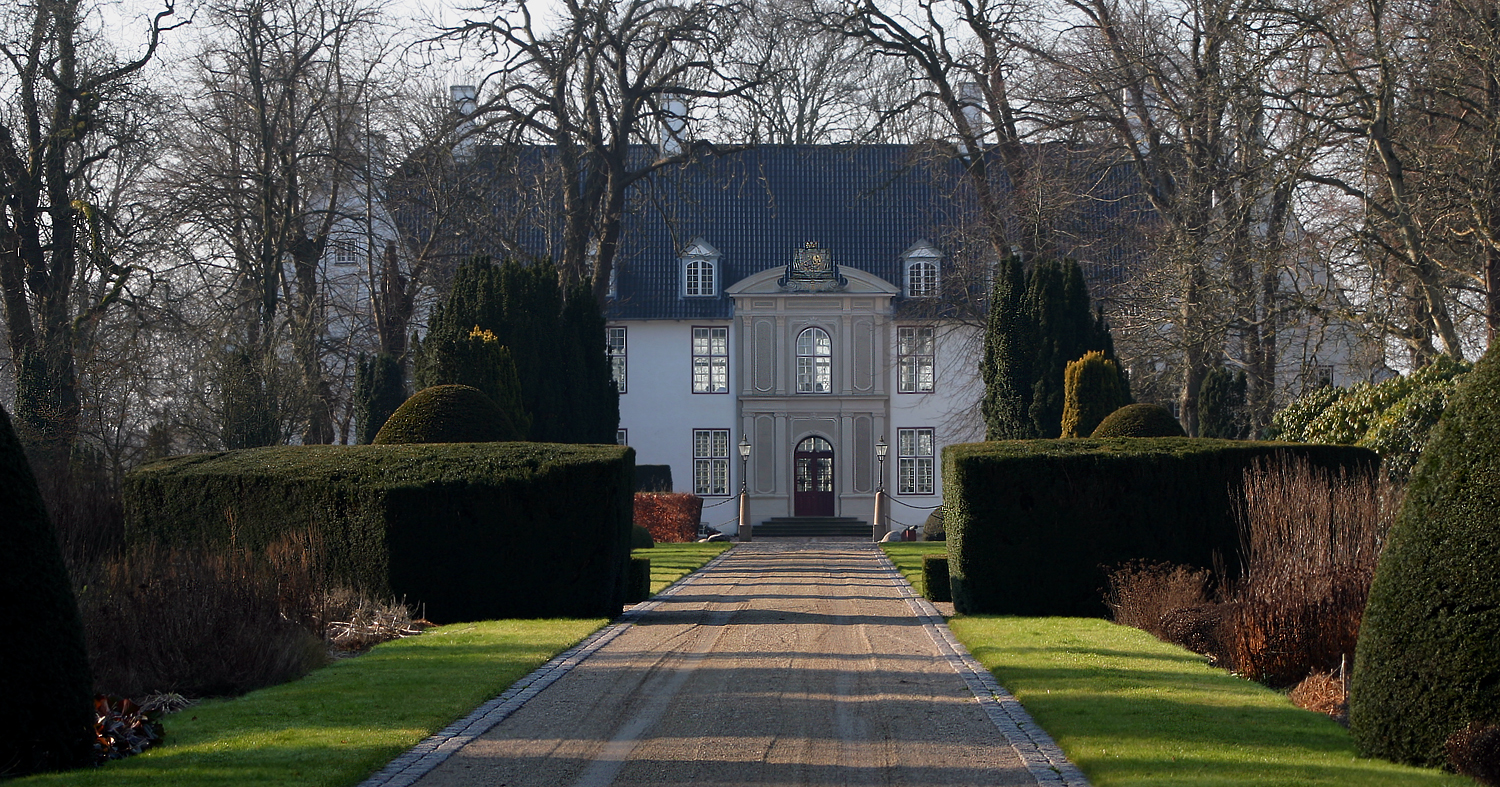
Schackenborg Castle, photographed in 2006.

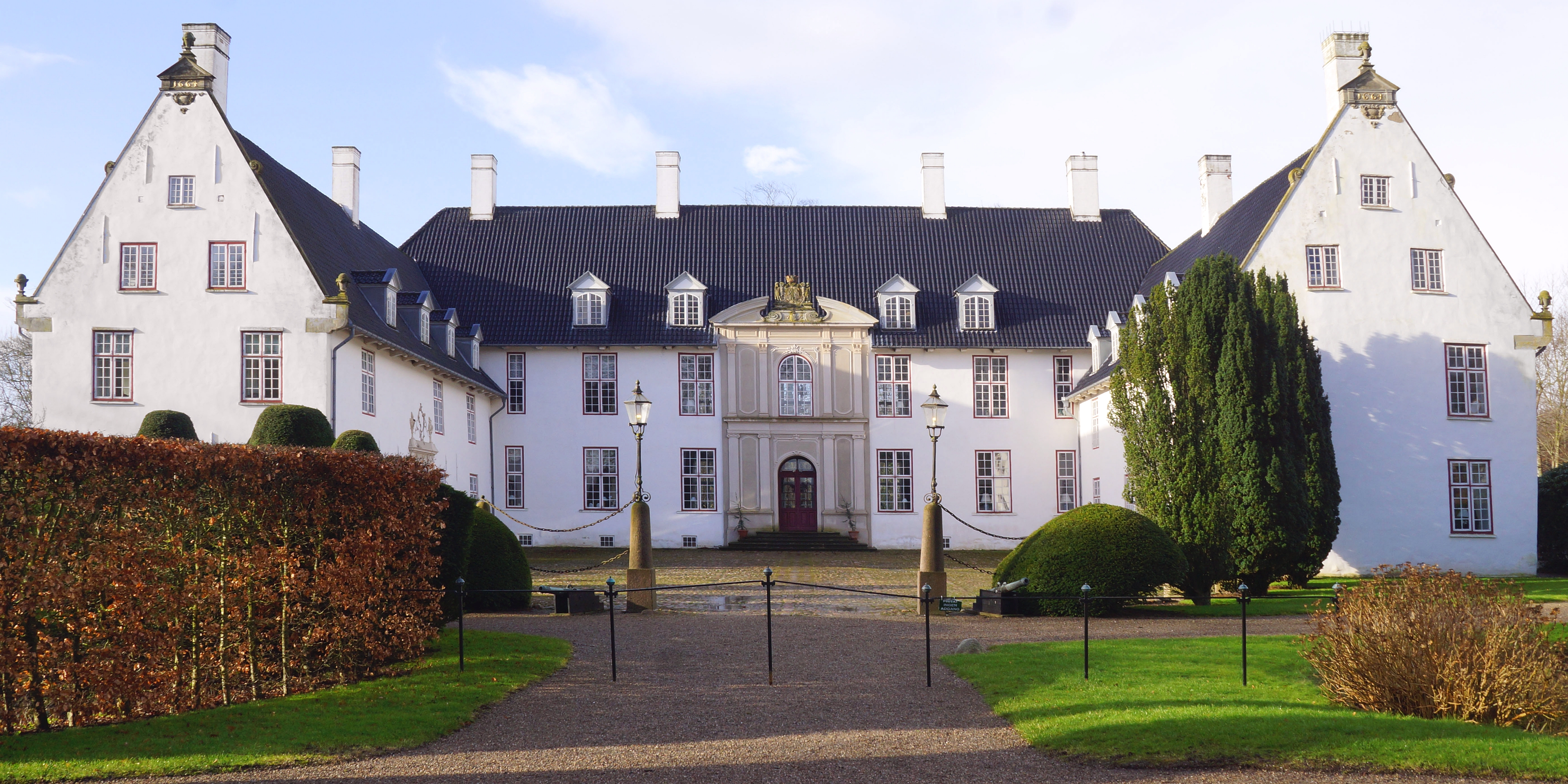
Schackenborg Castle, front from east side (2023)

Hans Schack was born on 4 April 1786 in Copenhagen in the Kingdom of Denmark. Born into the noble family of Schack, he was the second child and only son of the Danish nobleman and civil servant Otto Didrik Schack, and his first wife Amalie Magdalene Christiane Caroline von Krogh.

At the death of his father on 18 August 1809, he inherited the Countship of Schackenborg and assumed the title of enfeoffed count.

Count Schack died already on 4 April 1814, aged just 27, in Copenhagen in the Kingdom of Denmark. He was succeeded as Count of Schackenborg by his eldest surviving son, Otto Didrik Schack.

== Family ==
Count Schack married in 1810 Countess Louise Frederikke Lerche, daughter of Dano-Norwegian aristocrat and civil servant Christian Cornelius Lerche, 1st Count of Lerchenborg and Ulrikke Sophie von Levetzow, by whom he had two children.

- Otto Didrik Schack, who succeeded him as 7th Count of Schackenborg (1810–1856)
- Countess Sophie Schack (1812–1817)
- stillborn daughter (1813)

== Notes and references ==
=== Bibliography ===
- Danmarks Adels Aarbog 1932 (PDF). Copenhagen: J.H. Schultz. 1932.

Danish nobility
Preceded by Otto Didrik Schack	Count of Schackenborg; 1809–1814	Succeeded by Otto Didrik Schack
