= Møgeltønder Parish =

Parish in Tønder Municipality, Denmark

Møgeltønder Parish Møgeltønder Sogn
- Parish
- The parish within Tønder Municipality
- Country: Denmark
- Region: Southern Denmark
- Municipality: Tønder Municipality
- Diocese: Ribe

Population (2025)
  - Total: 1,014
- Parish number: 9044

Møgeltønder Parish (Danish: Møgeltønder Sogn) is a parish in the Diocese of Ribe in Tønder Municipality, Denmark. The parish contains the town of Møgeltønder.
