= Bo Schack =

Danish lawyer

Bo Schack is a Danish lawyer. On 5 January 2010 he was appointed by the United Nations Secretary-General Ban Ki-moon as Deputy Special Representative of the Secretary General in the Central African Republic. This appointment is in addition to the nominations in October 2009 as the United Nations Resident and Humanitarian Coordinator, as well as UNDP Resident Representative in the country. Since 1985 he has been working for United Nations primarily in the humanitarian field.

== Biography ==
Bo Schack finished his law degree from the University of Copenhagen in 1982. He joined the United Nations Refugee Agency (UNHCR) in August 1985 after having worked as an Associate Attorney in Copenhagen and with the Danish Ministry of Industry. In addition between 1983 and 1984 he studied International Law at the European College in Bruges, Belgium and obtained in 1998 a master's degree in Business Administration (MBA) from the Open University Business School, United Kingdom.

Between 1985 and until the appointment as Deputy Special Representative of the Secretary General, Bo Schack was working for UNHCR in a number of legal and protection oriented functions starting in Senegal, (1985 to 1988), Hong Kong, (1988 to 1991), UNHCR Headquarters, Asia Bureau, (1991 to 1994), the UNHCR Special Operation in the former Yugoslavia (1994 to 1997), Sri Lanka (1997 to 2000). In 2000 he was appointed to Iran as the Deputy Representative before after a three years assignment being appointed in 2003 as Head of the Policy Unit, Europe Bureau, UNHCR Headquarters. From 2007 to 2009 he was the UNHCR Representative in Burundi. The years with UNHCR allowed Bo Schack important humanitarian and management experience from a number of regions in the world. The functions were mainly associated with negotiations involving all those affected by or involved in refugee situations, internal displacement and repatriation operations. In particular this has been related to the status and treatment of refugees and internally displaced, access for humanitarian assistance, negotiations on agreements linked to voluntary repatriation and return of displaced. The responsibilities took a turn towards more broader UN involvement in 2007 with the focus in Burundi on more development oriented reintegration programmes for Burundian refugees coming home from primarily Tanzania.

This extensive experience in the many areas of the United Nations work will be important for his functions in the Central African Republic within the newly established United Nations Integrated Peacebuilding Office in the Central African Republic (BINUCA). The primary role of the United Nations in the country are linked to further initiatives for the consolidation of the peace, the support to the government in development of the country as well as coordinating the continuing humanitarian assistance being provided by UN Agencies and non-governmental organisations (NGOs).

On 1 September 2015, he was appointed Director of Operations for UNRWA (The United Nations Relief and Works Agency for Palestine Refugees in the near east) in Gaza.

He has six children.
