= Hans Schack =

Danish military leader (1608–1676)

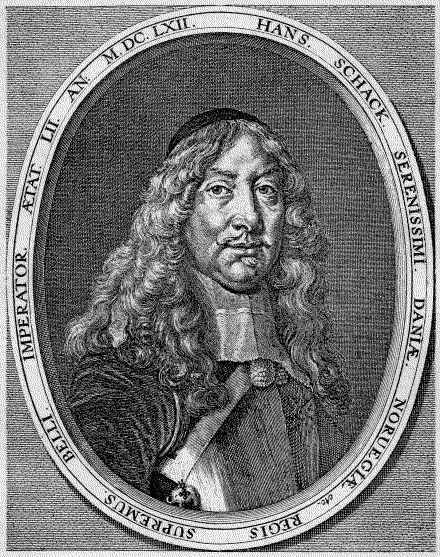
- Born: 28 October 1608; Langballig, Duchy of Schleswig
- Died: 27 February 1676 (aged 67); Copenhagen, Denmark
- Burial place: Trinitatis Church, Copenhagen
- Military career
- Allegiance: Denmark-Norway (1627–1630); Sweden (1630–1635); France (1635–1651); Hamburg (1656–1658); Denmark-Norway (1658–1676)
- Rank: Field marshal
- Conflicts: Thirty Years' War; Second Northern War; Siege of Copenhagen; Battle of Nyborg
- Awards: Order of the Elephant; Order of the Dannebrog

Hans Schack (28 October 1608 – 27 February 1676) was a member of the north German noble family Schack, who after many years in French service, entered the Danish service, made major contributions during the war with Sweden, and loyally supported Frederick III when he overthrew the Danish constitution. He became a Danish field-marshal, commander-in-chief of the Danish army, member of the Board of State, and of the Danish Privy Council, and made a Danish count.

== Early career ==
As a young man, Schack began his military career by serving in the Danish army during the early years of the Thirty Years' War. He entered Swedish service in 1630, and thence in French in 1635, becoming colonel of cavalry 1642, and later maréchal de camp. In 1651 Schack retired from the French service to his estates in Saxe-Lauenburg, where he remained until 1656, when he became military commandant of Hamburg.

== Danish service ==
Faced with imminent war with Sweden, the Danish government wanted to recruit the experienced and reputed Schack for a senior position in the Danish army. In order to satisfy Schack's demand for a permanent position, he was in 1658 appointed lieutenant-general, colonel of horse and foot, and made a member of the War Council. He also became naturalized as a Danish nobleman, receiving two estates in life tenancy; Riberhus and Møgeltønder (the later Schackenborg Castle). As military governor, Schack commanded Copenhagen during the Swedish siege of 1659. For his successful defence of the city, he was rewarded with promotion to field-marshal. In the fall of the same year, Schack led the Danish forces to victory over the Swedes at the battle of Nyborg. When the Scanian War broke out, Schack was commander-in-chief of the Danish army (after the king), but his poor health did not let him participate in the campaign and he died before the second campaign season had started.

== Political role ==
Schack was a popular figure in Copenhagen, not only as a defender of the city against the Swedes, but as a defender of its privileges. In 1660 he was co-opted to the Danish Rigsråd, in spite of being a recently naturalized foreigner. When Frederick III in the same year overthrow the Danish constitution, and created an absolute monarchy, Schack was, together with Hannibal Sehested, the King's main supporter in the Rigsråd, persuading the clergy and bourgeoisie to support the regime change. The King needed loyal supporters in the government, and Schack was in 1660 appointed to Rigsfeltherre (commander-in-chief of the Danish army), and made president of the Board of War, a member of the Board of State, and Stiftsbefalingsmand of Ribe stift. In 1670 he was also appointed a member of the Gehejmekonseil (Privy Council), which that year was created as a successor to the Rigsråd. Within the new government, he was the leading proponent of the military party, in opposition to Sehested and the Treasury, and an efficient administrator of military affairs. As a reward, he was in 1661 given Møgeltønder in fee simple, and became one of the first enfeoffed counts, Lensgreve, when the King in 1671 created that dignity.

== Bibliography ==
- Fridericia, Julius Albert (1901). "Schack, Hans Greve". In Bricka, Carl Frederik (ed.). Dansk biografisk Lexikon, tillige omfattende Norge for tidsrummet 1537-1814 (in Danish). Vol. 15 (1st ed.). Copenhagen: Gyldendalske Boghandels Forlag. pp. 21–28.
- Opitz, Eckardt (1985). "Schack, Hans von" (PDF). In Schleswig-Holsteinische Landesbibliothek (ed.). Biographisches Lexikon für Schleswig-Holstein und Lübeck (in German). Vol. 7. Neumünster: Wachholtz Verlag. ISBN 3-529-02647-6.
- Rockstroh, K.C. (1941). "Schack, Hans Greve" (PDF). In Engelstoft, Povl; Dahl, Svend (eds.). Dansk Biografisk Leksikon (in Danish). Vol. 21 (2nd ed.). Copenhagen: J.H. Schultz Forlag. pp. 10–15. Archived from the original (PDF) on 13 December 2014.
