= Hans Schack, 4th Count of Schackenborg =

Danish nobleman

Hans Schack
- Count of Schackenborg
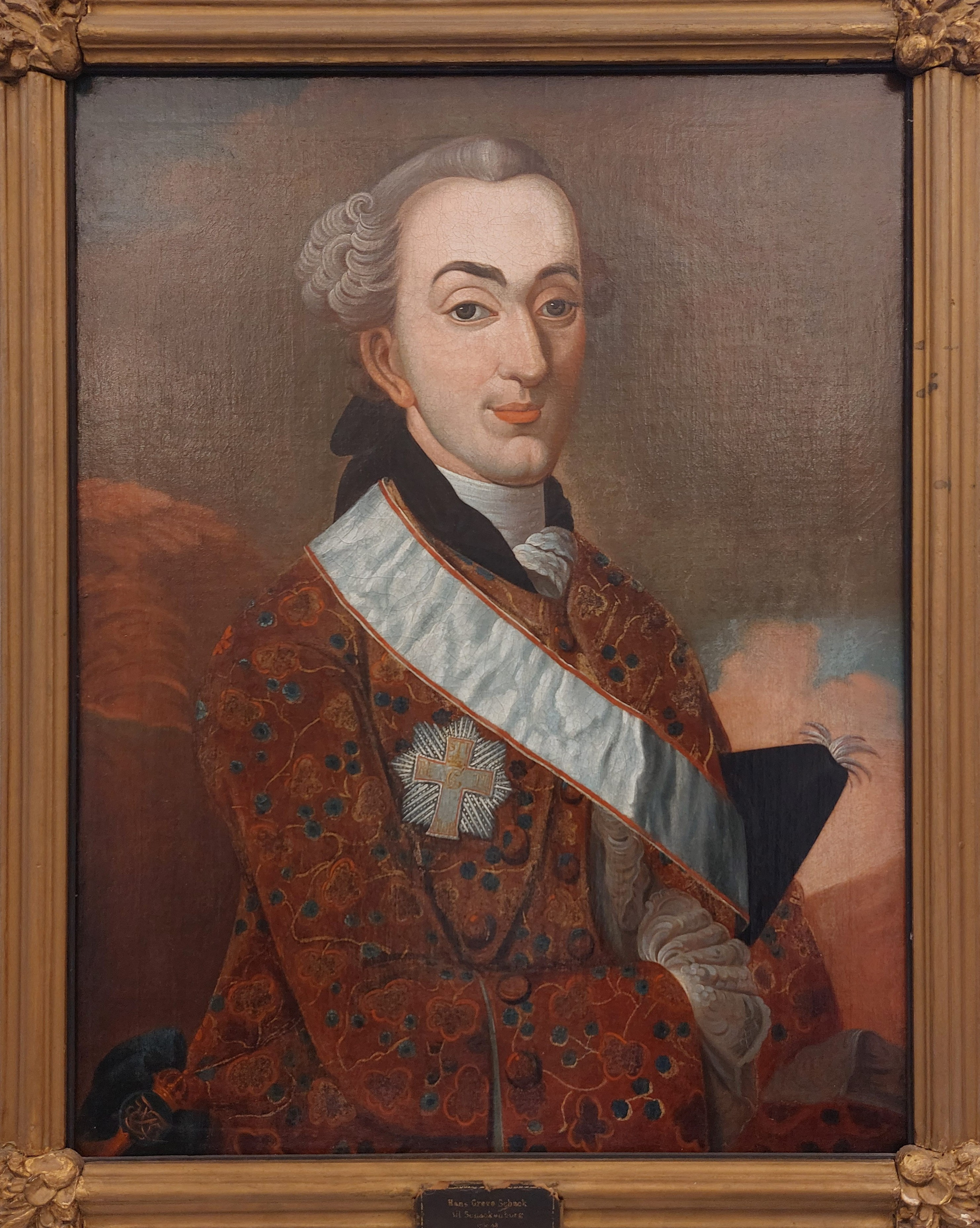

Count of Schackenborg
- Tenure: 7 October 1741 – 21 August 1796
- Predecessor: Otto Didrik Schack
- Successor: Otto Didrik Schack
- Full name: Hans Schack
- Born: 14 January 1734; Schackenborg Castle, Møgeltønder, Kingdom of Denmark
- Died: 21 August 1796 (aged 62); Schackenborg Castle, Møgeltønder, Kingdom of Denmark
- Buried: Møgeltønder Church, Møgeltønder, Kingdom of Denmark
- Noble family: Schack
- Spouse: Ulrikke Augusta Vilhelmine Moltke
- Issue Detail: Otto Didrik Schack, 5th Count of Schackenborg; Frederikke Juliane Schack; Anna Ernestine Schack; Adamine Frederikke Schack; Caroline Mathilde Juliane Schack; Sophie Albertine Ernestine Schack
- Father: Otto Didrik Schack, 3rd Count of Schackenborg
- Mother: Anna Ernestine Frederikke Vilhelmine Gabel

Hans Schack, Count of Schackenborg (14 January 1734 – 21 August 1796) was a Danish nobleman and enfeoffed count (Danish: lensgreve). He was the fourth holder of the Countship of Schackenborg from 1741 to 1796.

== Biography ==
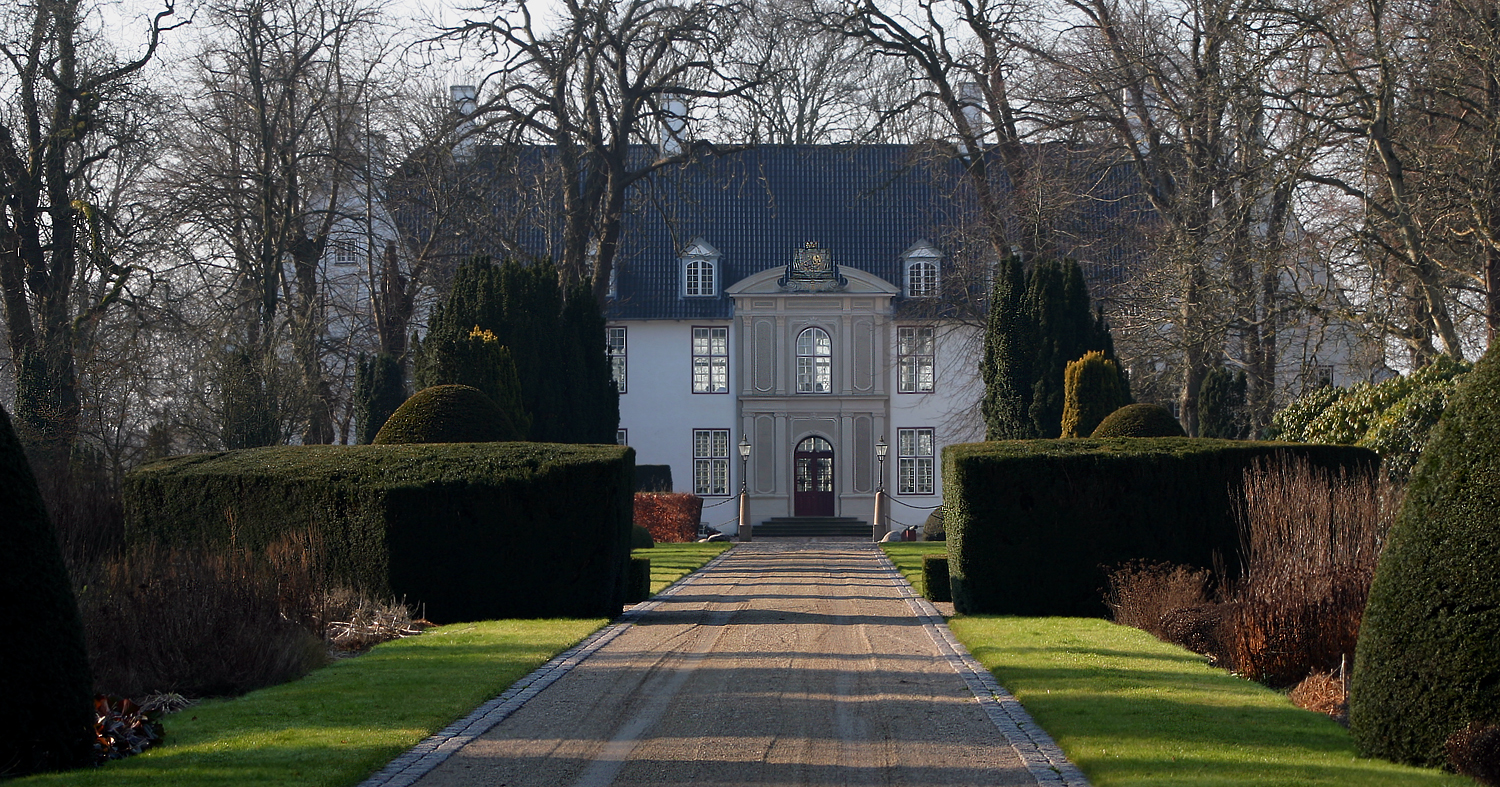
Schackenborg Castle, photographed in 2006.

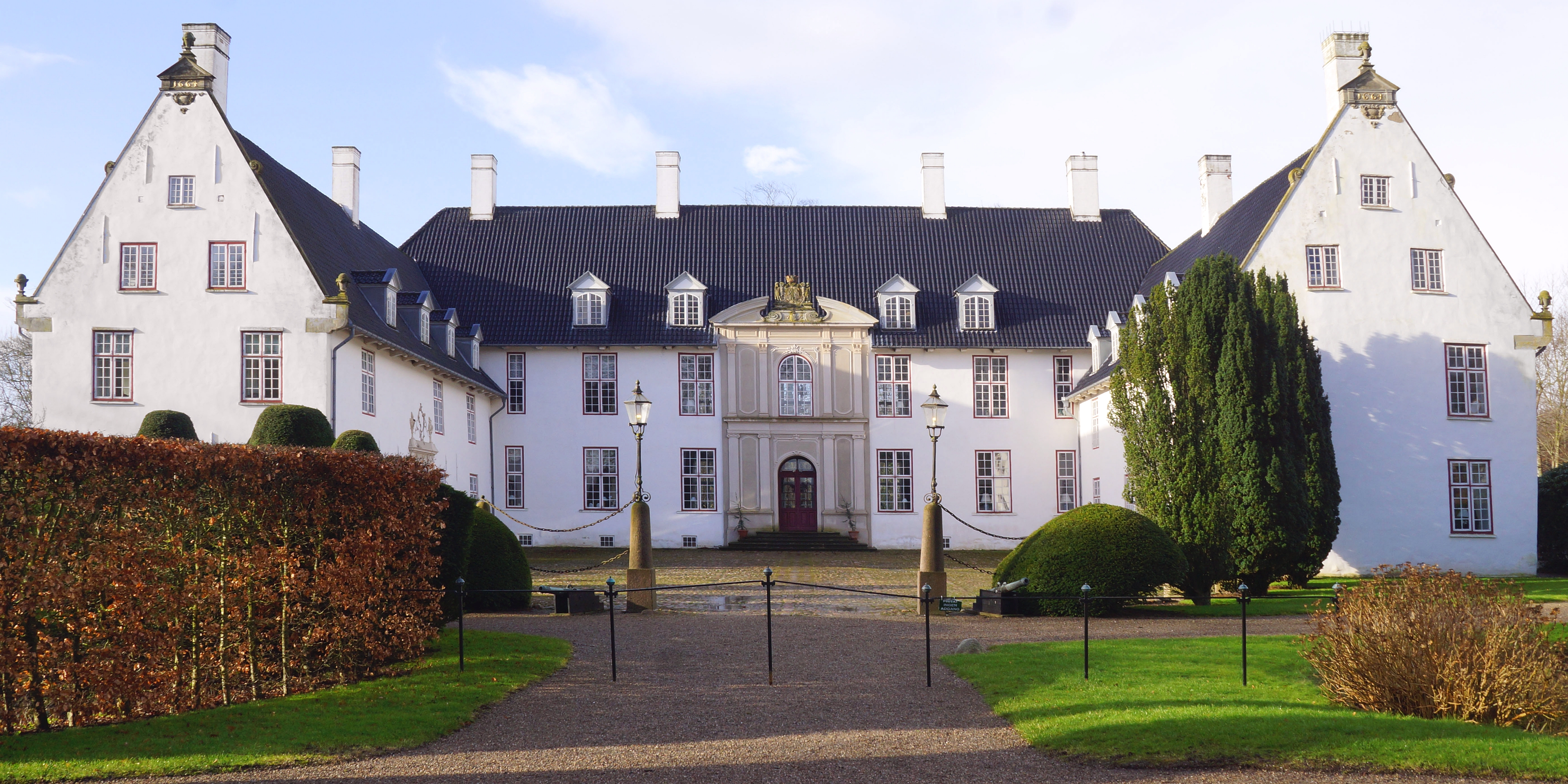
Schackenborg Castle, front from east side (2023)

Hans Schack was born on 14 January 1734 at Schackenborg Castle in Møgeltønder in the Kingdom of Denmark. Born into the noble family of Schack, he was the fifth child and eldest surviving son of the Danish nobleman and civil servant Otto Didrik Schack, and his wife Anna Ernestine Frederikke Vilhelmine Gabel .

At the early death of his father on 11 July 1741, he inherited the Countship of Schackenborg and assumed the title of enfeoffed count.

Count Schack died on 21 August 1796, aged 62, at Schackenborg Castle. He was succeeded by his eldest surviving son, Otto Didrik Schack.

== Family ==
Schack married firstly on 7 January 1757 at Christiansborg Palace Chapel in Copenhagen Ulrikke Augusta Vilhelmine Moltke, daughter of Danish courtier, statesman and diplomat Count Adam Gottlob Moltke and Christiane Frederikke von Brüggemann, by whom he had four children. She died on 7 April 1763 in Copenhagen.

- Otto Didrik Schack, who succeeded him as 5th Count of Schackenborg.
- Countess Frederikke Juliane Schack (1762–1815)
- Countess Anne Ernestine Schack (1762–1763)
- Countess Adamine Frederikke Schack (1763–1825)

Schack married secondly on 7 October 1763 at Lohma in the Duchy of Saxe-Altenburg Caroline Louise Sophie von Moltke, daughter of Joachim Christoph von Moltke and Sophia Albertina von Wolzogen), by whom he had four children. She died on 12 September 1794.

- Countess Caroline Mathilde Juliane Schack (1768–1775)
- stillborn son (1770)
- Countess Sophie Albertine Ernestine Schack (1772–1774)
- stillborn son (1775)

== Notes and references ==
=== Bibliography ===
- Danmarks Adels Aarbog 1932 (PDF). Copenhagen: J.H. Schultz. 1932.

Danish nobility
Preceded by Otto Didrik Schack	Count of Schackenborg; 1741–1796	Succeeded by Otto Didrik Schack
