= Countship of Schackenborg =

- Creation date: 23 June 1676
- Created by: Christian V
- First holder: Otto Didrik Schack
- Last holder: Otto Didrik Schack
- Extinction date: 1924
- Seat: Schackenborg Castle
- Former seats: Schack's Palace, Copenhagen

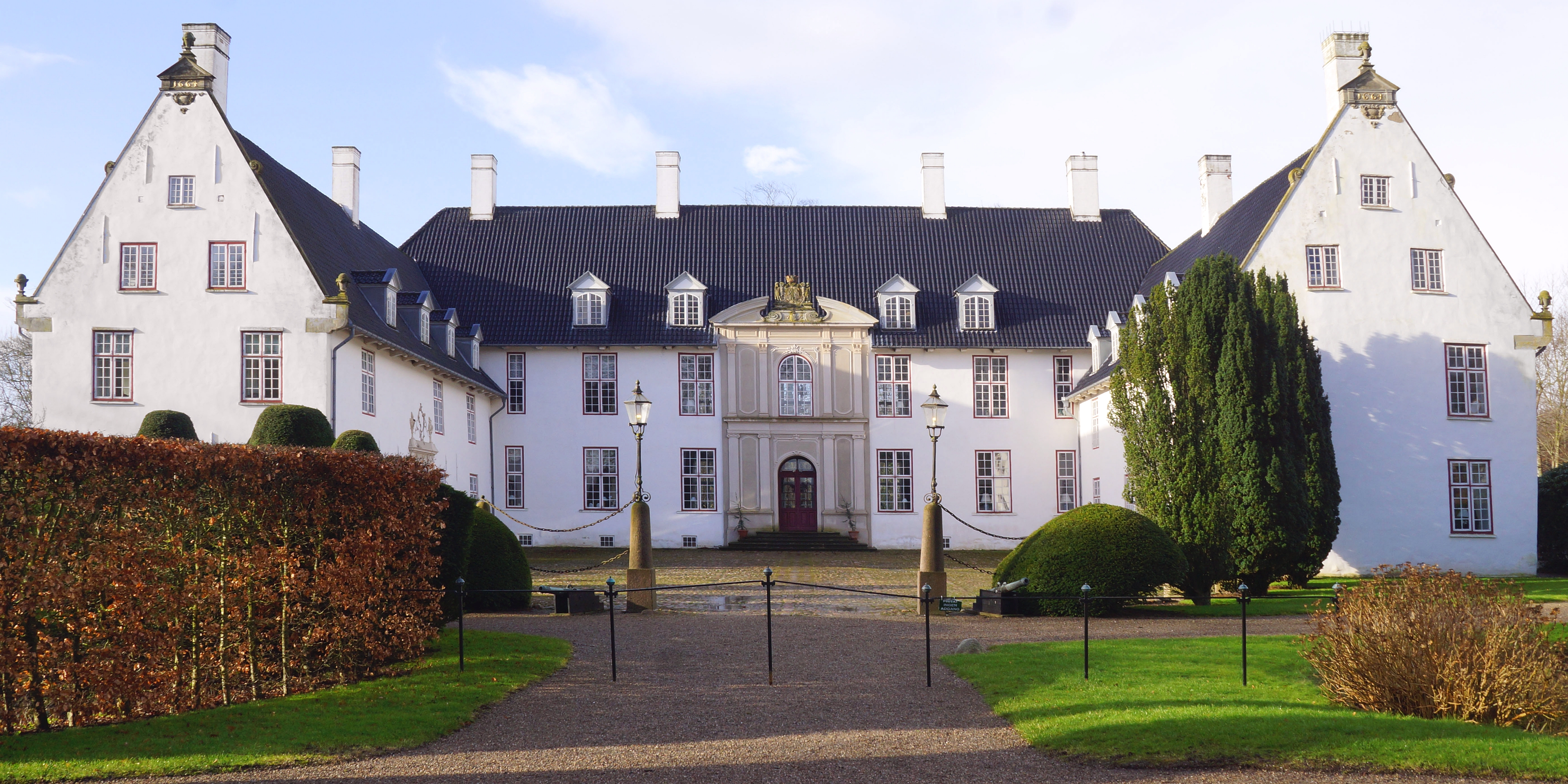
Schackenborg Castle from east side (2023)

The Countship of Schackenborg was a Danish and for a period German majorat in the southern part of Jutland, which existed from 1676 to 1924.

== History ==
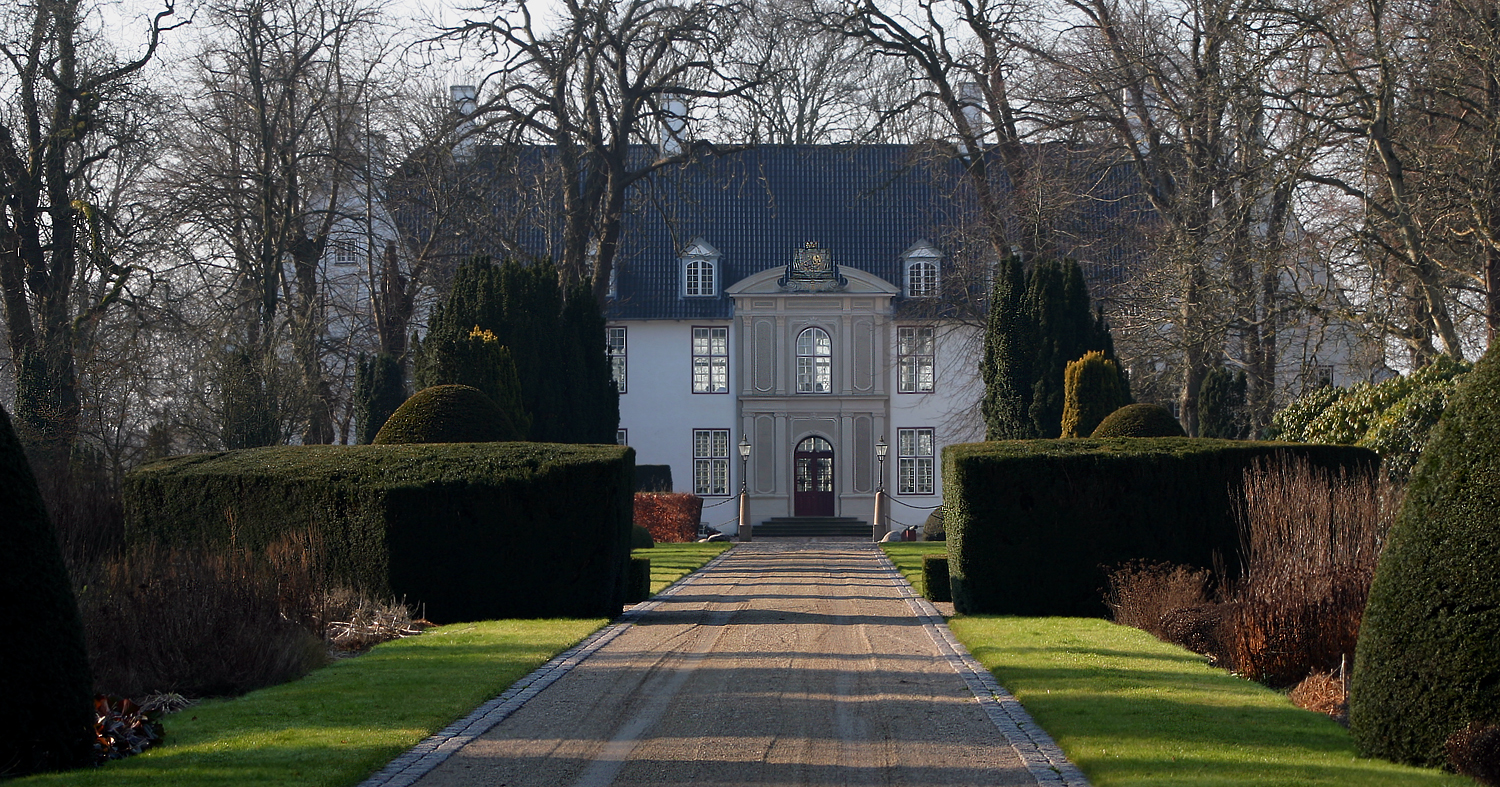
Schackenborg Castle, photographed in 2006.

The Countship of Schackenborg was established on 23 June 1676 by King Christian V of Denmark for Otto Didrik Schack, a member of the noble family of Schack. It consisted of the manors of Schackenborg, Sødamgård, Solvig, and Store Tønde. The holder of the county carried the title of enfeoffed count (Danish: lensgreve).

The countship was inherited by members of the Schack family during its entire existence. It was dissolved in 1924.

=== List of counts of Schackenborg ===
- Otto Didrik Schack, 1st Count of Schackenborg (1652–1683)
- Hans Schack, 2nd Count of Schackenborg (1676–1719)
- Otto Didrik Schack, 3rd Count of Schackenborg (1710–1741)
- Hans Schack, 4th Count of Schackenborg (1734–1796)
- Otto Didrik Schack, 5th Count of Schackenborg (1758–1809)
- Hans Schack, 6th Count of Schackenborg (1786–1814)
- Otto Didrik Schack, 7th Count of Schackenborg (1810–1856)
- Hans Schack, 8th Count of Schackenborg (1852–1905)
- Otto Didrik Schack, 9th Count of Schackenborg (1882–1924)

== Notes and references ==
=== Bibliography ===
- Danmarks Adels Aarbog 1932 (PDF) (in Danish). Copenhagen: J.H. Schultz. 1932.
- Louis Bobé, Gustav Graae, Frederik Jürgensen West (1916). Danske Len (PDF) (in Danish). Copenhagen: J.H. Schultz.
- F. Krogh (1868). De danske Majorater. En genealogisk haandbog (PDF) (in Danish). Copenhagen: Chr. Steen & Søn.
