= Schackenborg Castle =

- Schackenborg Slot (Danish)
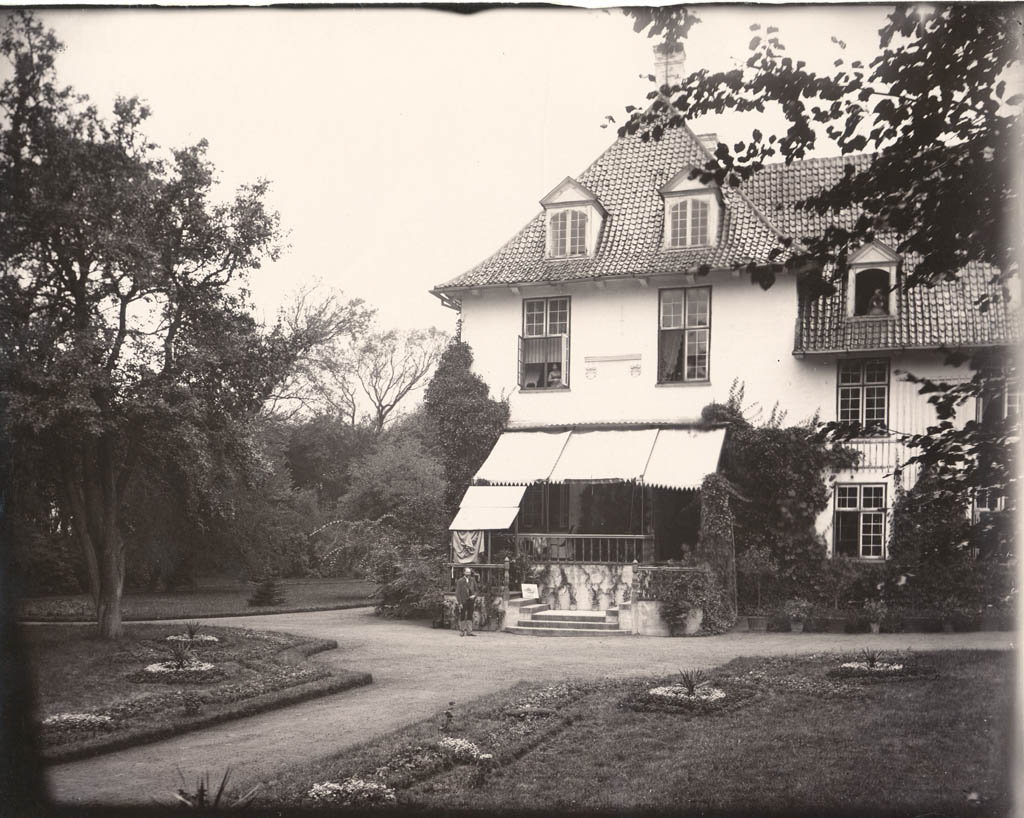

- Location within Region of Southern Denmark
- 54°56′33.8″N 8°48′31.69″E

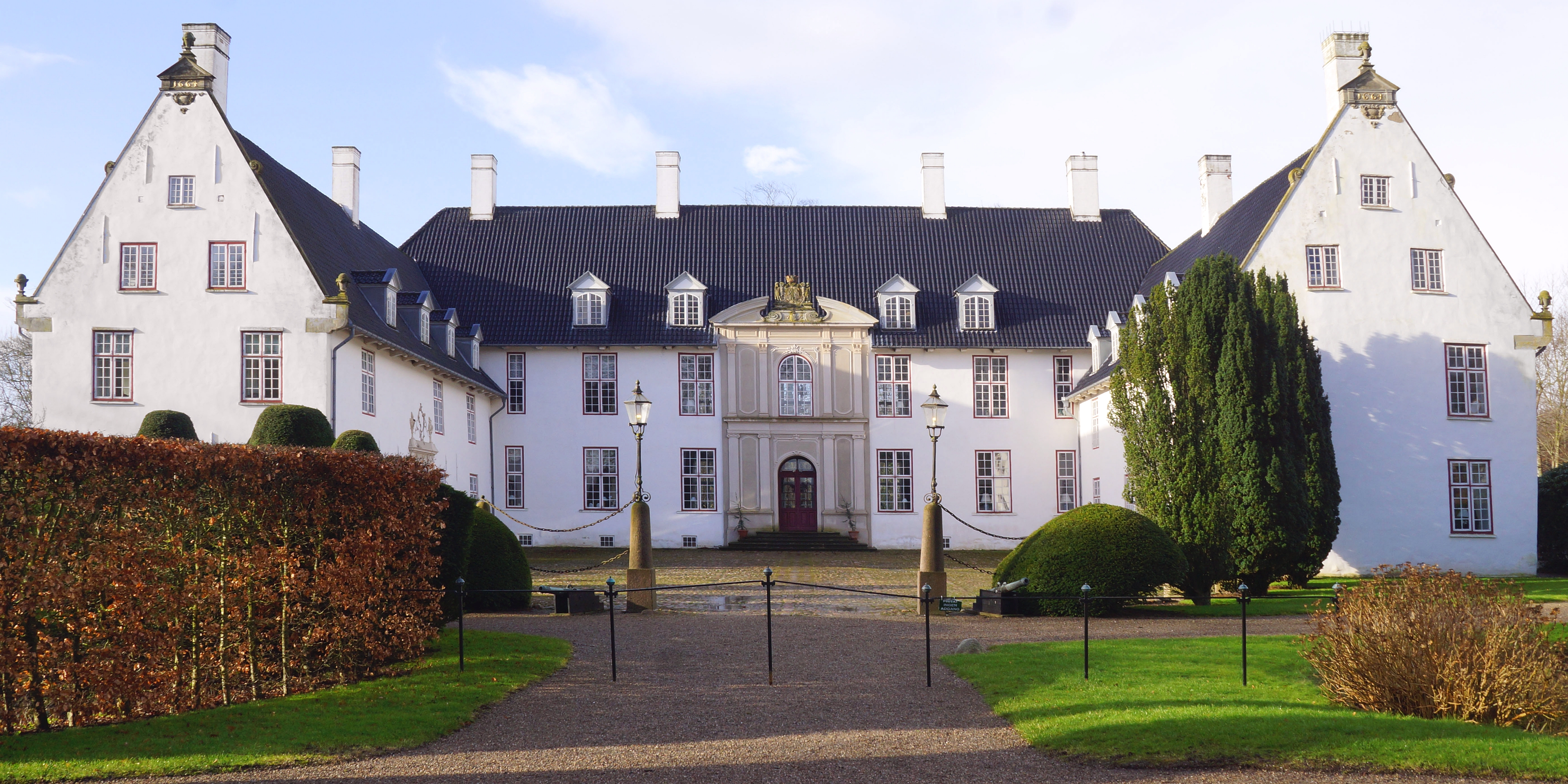
Schackenborg Castle - total view east side (2023)

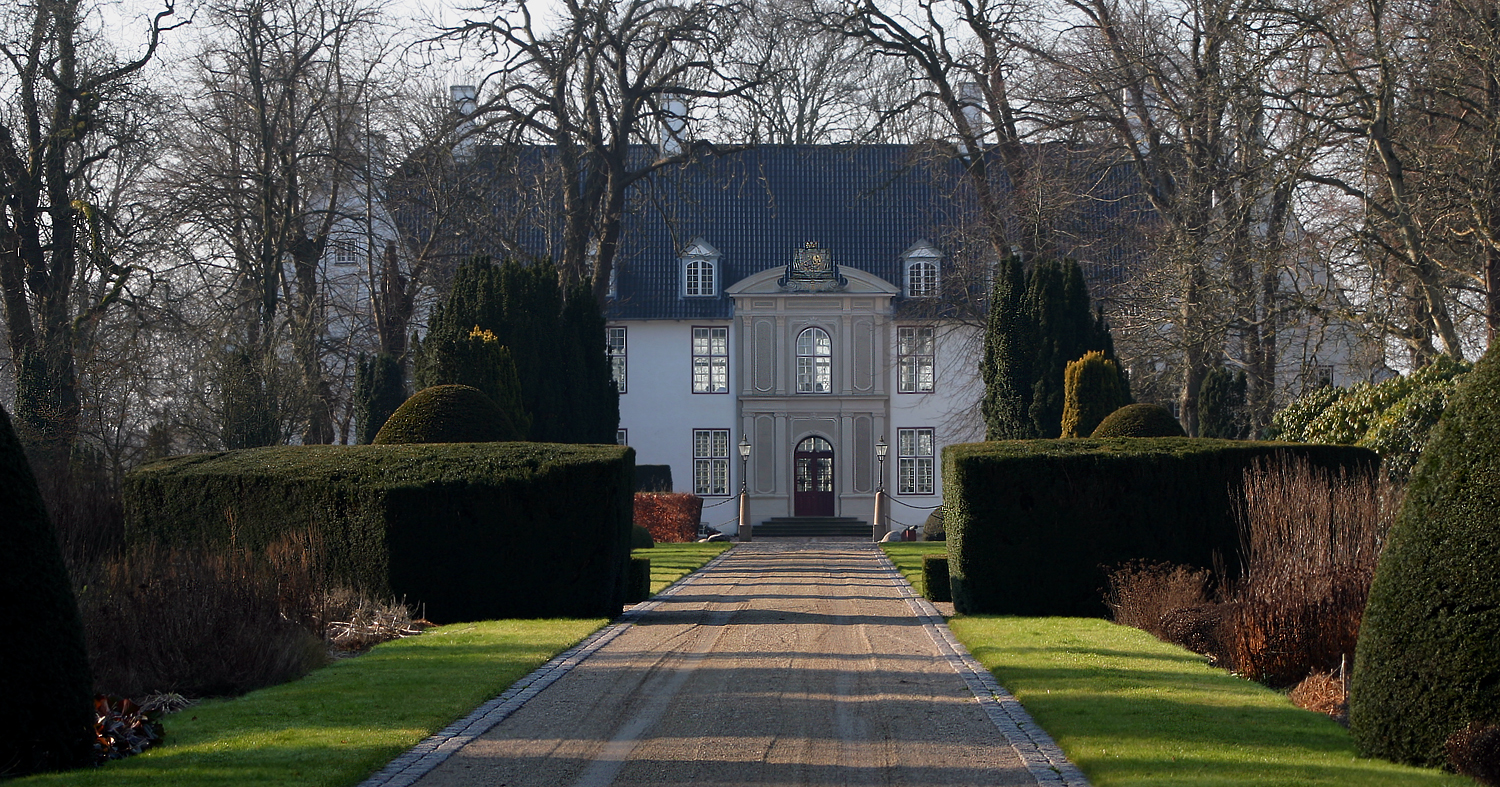
Entrance front of Schackenborg Castle

Schackenborg Castle (Danish: Schackenborg Slot, pronounced [ˈɕɑkŋ̍ˌpɒˀ ˈslʌt]) is a château located in Møgeltønder Parish, Southern Jutland. From 1993 until 2014, it was the private residence of Prince Joachim of Denmark, the second son of Queen Margrethe II of Denmark.

== History ==
Originally called Møgeltønderhus (Møgeltønder House), the former stronghold on the site was the property of the Roman Catholic bishops of Ribe. It served as protection against the Frisians in the south, and guarded the waterway that joined Vidå to Tønder.

During the Reformation in Denmark, the mansion was confiscated from the Church by the Danish crown. Count Hans von Schack, a Schleswig nobleman and soldier, was given Møgeltønderhus as a token of King Frederick III of Denmark's gratitude for his military achievements in the Northern Wars. Schack demolished most of the mansion in 1661 due to its bad condition, building the more impressive, baroque style "Schackenborg Castle".

In 1680, a street was laid out from the manor house, leading toward the local church. For eleven generations, the castle belonged to the von Schack family before reverting to the Danish Royal Family again in 1978.

=== Prince Joachim residency ===
In 1993, Schackenborg and the extensive estate were transferred to Prince Joachim of Denmark, the younger son of Queen Margrethe II. In 1995, it was announced that Prince Joachim and then-Princess Alexandra would finally be moving into the residence. For their wedding, a national collection was made, known as the "Nation's Gift". Several million Danish kroner were raised. Prince Joachim announced that the money would be spent on a restoration programme for the castle.

The castle and the surrounding park are not open to the general public; however, guided tours of the gardens are sometimes available during the summer. Since 2014, it has been owned by a foundation and not by any member of the royal family.

== See also ==
- County of Schackenborg
