= 2025 Tønder municipal election =

Municipal election in Denmark

- 18 November 2025

All 31 seats to the Tønder municipal council 16 seats needed for a majority
- Turnout: 19,943 (68.8%) ▼1.0%
	First party	Second party	Third party
	S	T	V
Party	Schleswig Party	Tønder Listen	Venstre
Last election	4 seats, 13.3%	9 seats, 29.0%	6 seats, 17.1%
Seats won	8	6	6
Seat change	▲4	▼3	0
Popular vote	5,029	3,679	3,396
Percentage	25.7%	18.8%	17.3%
Swing	▲12.4%	▼10.2%	▲0.3%
	Fourth party	Fifth party	Sixth party
	A	O	F
Party	Social Democrats	Danish People's Party	Green Left
Last election	5 seats, 14.8%	0 seats, 2.8%	1 seat, 4.0%
Seats won	4	3	1
Seat change	▼1	▲3	0
Popular vote	2,372	1,838	1,019
Percentage	12.1%	9.4%	5.2%
Swing	▼2.7%	▲6.6%	▲1.2%
	Seventh party	Eighth party	Ninth party
	Æ	I	C
Party	Denmark Democrats	Liberal Alliance	Conservatives
Last election	Did not stand	0 seats, 0.7%	2 seats, 5.5%
Seats won	1	1	1
Seat change	▲1	▲1	▼1
Popular vote	960	589	515
Percentage	4.9%	3.0%	2.6%
Swing	New	▲2.3%	▼2.8%
Mayor before election
Jørgen Popp Petersen
Schleswig Party
Mayor after election
Jørgen Popp Petersen
Schleswig Party

The 2025 Tønder Municipal election will be held on November 18, 2025, to elect the 31 members to sit in the regional council for the Tønder Municipal council, in the period of 2026 to 2029. Jørgen Popp Petersen from Schleswig Party, would secure re-election.

== Background ==
Following the 2021 election, Jørgen Popp Petersen from the Schleswig Party became mayor for his first term, and the party's first mayor since 1946. In the 2021 election, the newly created local party Tønder Listen, won the most seats, but lost the mayoral position to the Schleswig Party. The party leader, Henrik Frandsen, later became an MF following the 2022 Danish general election. Following this, Frandsen announced on 8 January, 2024 that he intended to drop out of local politics. Popp Petersen did however, seek the mayoral position again and to be re-elected. In September 2025, it was revealed that Popp Petersen had been reported to the police 8 times between 2019 and 2024, on breaking the law on his pig farm.

== Electoral system ==
For elections to Danish municipalities, a number varying from 9 to 31 are chosen to be elected to the municipal council. The seats are then allocated using the D'Hondt method and a closed list proportional representation. Tønder Municipality had 31 seats in 2025.

== Electoral alliances ==
=== Electoral Alliance 1 ===
Party		Political alignment
C	Conservatives	Centre-right
I	Liberal Alliance	Centre-right to Right-wing
O	Danish People's Party	Right-wing to Far-right
Y	Velfærdsdemokraterne	Local politics

=== Electoral Alliance 2 ===
Party		Political alignment
F	Green Left	Centre-left to Left-wing
Å	The Alternative	Centre-left to Left-wing

=== Electoral Alliance 3 ===
Party		Political alignment
V	Venstre	Centre-right
Æ	Denmark Democrats	Right-wing to Far-right

== Results by polling station ==
Division	A	C	F	I	O	S	T	V	Y	Æ	Å
Division	%	%	%	%	%	%	%	%	%	%	%
Bredebro	23.5	3.4	1.6	2.2	12.3	20.1	15.5	13.8	0.7	6.8	0.2
Ballum	7.2	3.3	4.4	1.1	18.5	19.6	22.9	13.0	1.7	7.5	0.8
Visby	11.0	6.0	1.1	2.8	13.1	32.5	13.1	13.1	0.7	6.0	0.7
Højer	17.3	2.7	5.3	1.2	10.1	31.7	19.2	8.5	0.2	3.5	0.2
Sdr. Sejerslev	9.4	4.7	5.8	1.8	7.2	27.1	24.9	6.9	1.1	10.8	0.4
Møgeltønder	19.7	1.4	6.0	1.0	5.9	23.8	15.3	22.4	0.2	3.8	0.5
Løgumkloster	9.3	1.9	3.7	2.2	6.2	46.0	10.9	13.7	0.7	5.0	0.5
Nr. Løgum	10.6	1.2	2.8	2.8	7.3	41.8	10.2	15.8	0.1	7.3	0.3
Bedsted Friskole	6.4	1.9	4.0	1.9	6.9	46.9	5.6	18.6	0.3	7.4	0.3
Øster Højst	3.7	2.4	2.0	1.8	9.7	51.0	6.2	14.9	0.2	8.1	0.0
Agerskov	7.9	8.2	3.8	3.2	8.5	18.2	9.3	33.4	0.3	7.2	0.1
Arrild	7.1	1.0	4.3	3.3	11.6	13.1	7.3	44.3	0.5	6.5	1.0
Branderup	9.3	2.8	4.0	4.0	10.9	20.2	10.5	29.6	0.4	8.1	0.0
Døstrup	10.9	3.9	3.2	6.4	23.8	9.6	25.7	7.1	0.6	8.0	0.6
Toftlund	12.1	2.0	3.5	2.1	8.4	14.4	14.9	37.8	0.1	4.1	0.5
Brøns	7.6	1.4	6.0	10.4	17.9	5.6	31.5	6.6	2.8	8.4	1.6
Tønderhallerne	14.5	2.4	9.2	1.5	4.6	31.7	20.6	12.7	0.3	2.2	0.4
Abild	8.4	3.8	4.1	1.2	12.8	25.3	27.2	7.6	0.2	8.8	0.5
Hostrup	9.8	4.1	8.4	1.0	7.5	33.8	11.6	19.6	0.2	3.7	0.4
Rømø	20.7	2.6	6.1	2.9	20.4	9.3	13.7	18.1	1.5	3.8	0.9
Skærbæk	10.3	1.2	4.1	8.8	13.8	10.1	37.4	8.8	0.4	4.1	1.0
Vodder	6.7	1.0	7.0	5.4	19.4	11.1	36.3	6.1	1.0	6.1	0.0

== Results ==
Party		Votes	%	+/-	Seats	+/-
Tønder Municipality
S	Schleswig Party	5,029	25.68	+12.39	8	+4
T	Tønder Listen	3,679	18.79	-10.23	6	-3
V	Venstre	3,396	17.34	+0.28	6	0
A	Social Democrats	2,372	12.11	-2.67	4	-1
O	Danish People's Party	1,838	9.39	+6.57	3	+3
F	Green Left	1,019	5.20	+1.25	1	0
Æ	Denmark Democrats	960	4.90	New	1	New
I	Liberal Alliance	589	3.01	+2.26	1	+1
C	Conservatives	515	2.63	-2.85	1	-1
Å	The Alternative	95	0.49	+0.10	0	0
Y	Velfærdsdemokraterne	91	0.46	New	0	New
Total		19,583	100	N/A	31	N/A
Invalid votes		83	0.29	-0.11		
Blank votes		277	0.96	+0.05		
Turnout		19,943	68.76	-1.04		
Source: valg.dk

== Opinion polls ==
Polling firm	Fieldwork date	Sample size	T	V	A	S	C	F	O	I	Å	Y	Æ	Others	Lead
Epinion	4 Sep - 13 Oct 2025	498	–	12.8	16.9	26.6	3.8	6.7	7.7	6.1	0.5	–	8.8	10.3	9.7
2024 european parliament election	9 Jun 2024		–	27.0	15.8	–	7.3	9.0	8.5	6.7	1.3	–	15.4	–	11.2
2022 general election	1 Nov 2022		–	15.3	26.2	–	4.6	5.0	3.0	5.6	0.8	–	14.9	–	10.9
2021 regional election	16 Nov 2021		–	56.3	17.5	–	4.0	4.9	4.3	0.7	0.4	–	–	–	38.8
2021 municipal election	16 Nov 2021		29.0 (9)	17.1 (6)	14.8 (5)	13.3 (4)	5.5 (2)	4.0 (1)	2.8 (0)	0.7 (0)	0.4 (0)	–	–	–	11.9
