= 2021 Tønder municipal election =

- 16 November 2021

All 31 seats to the Tønder Municipal Council 16 seats needed for a majority
- Turnout: 20,730 (69.8%) ▼2.2pp
	First party	Second party	Third party
	T	V	A
Party	Tønder Listen	Venstre	Social Democrats
Last election	Did not stand	15 seats, 44.6%	6 seats, 20.6%
Seats won	9	6	5
Seat change	▲9	▼9	▼1
Popular vote	5,906	3,472	3,010
Percentage	29.0%	17.1%	14.8%
Swing	New	▼27.5%	▼5.8%
	Fourth party	Fifth party	Sixth party
	S	L	C
Party	Schleswig Party	Borgerlisten	Conservatives
Last election	2 seats, 5.8%	1 seat, 4.4%	1 seat, 2.7%
Seats won	4	3	2
Seat change	▲2	▲2	▲1
Popular vote	2,706	1,509	1,115
Percentage	13.3%	7.4%	5.5%
Swing	▲7.5%	▲3.0%	▲2.8%
	Seventh party	Eighth party	Ninth party
	F	D	O
Party	Green Left	New Right	Danish People's Party
Last election	1 seat, 3.5%	0 seats, 0.7%	3 seats, 10.4%
Seats won	1	1	0
Seat change	0	▲1	▼3
Popular vote	805	747	573
Percentage	4.0%	3.7%	2.8%
Swing	▲0.5%	▲3.0%	▼7.6%
Mayor before election
Henrik Frandsen
Tønder Listen (Note: was elected as member of Venstre following the 2017 election)
Mayor after election
Jørgen Popp Petersen
Schleswig Party

In 2020, Venstre would drop, mayor at the time, Henrik Frandsen as their candidate for the next election. This led to Henrik Frandsen along with 5 others, to create Tønder Listen, a breakout party who intended to get Henrik Frandsen reelected as mayor.

In the election result, Tønder Listen would win 9 seats, while Venstre would lose 9 seats and only win 6. However, Venstre wanted to avoid Henrik Frandsen continuing as mayor. Eventually, Jørgen Popp Petersen from regional party Schleswig Party had a majority backing him as mayor. The agreement consisted of the Social Democrats, the Conservatives, New Right, Borgerlisten and Schleswig Party. This marked the first mayor from Schleswig Party in 75 years.

== Electoral system ==
For elections to Danish municipalities, a number varying from 9 to 31 are chosen to be elected to the municipal council. The seats are then allocated using the D'Hondt method and a closed list proportional representation. Tønder Municipality had 31 seats in 2021

Unlike in Danish General Elections, in elections to municipal councils, electoral alliances are allowed.

== Electoral alliances ==
=== Electoral Alliance 1 ===
Party		Political alignment
C	Conservatives	Centre-right
I	Liberal Alliance	Centre-right to Right-wing
S	Schleswig Party	Centre (Regionalism)

=== Electoral Alliance 2 ===
Party		Political alignment
D	New Right	Right-wing to Far-right
O	Danish People's Party	Right-wing to Far-right
V	Venstre	Centre-right

=== Electoral Alliance 3 ===
Party		Political alignment
F	Green Left	Centre-left to Left-wing
L	Borgerlisten	Local politics
Ø	Red–Green Alliance	Left-wing to Far-Left
Å	The Alternative	Centre-left to Left-wing

== Results by polling station ==
Division	A	C	D	F	I	L	O	S	T	V	Ø	Å
Division	%	%	%	%	%	%	%	%	%	%	%	%
Bredebro	27.6	3.3	2.4	2.0	1.8	6.4	2.8	10.6	26.8	15.6	0.4	0.2
Ballum	13.5	5.9	3.9	3.9	1.2	3.9	2.0	13.7	40.7	9.3	1.5	0.5
Visby	16.7	3.0	2.7	2.1	3.6	4.6	1.5	14.3	26.4	23.4	1.5	0.0
Højer	21.6	3.1	3.2	4.2	0.1	6.7	2.9	15.3	29.1	12.1	1.6	0.1
Nr. Løgum	12.5	3.4	4.7	1.9	0.4	8.7	3.2	21.0	19.2	24.0	0.4	0.5
Løgumkloster	12.1	5.0	3.8	2.1	0.4	5.6	2.8	26.2	19.1	20.6	2.1	0.1
Møgeltønder	20.0	3.6	2.7	5.4	0.7	6.3	4.2	11.2	21.5	22.5	1.3	0.6
Sdr. Sejerslev	10.9	9.1	3.2	1.8	2.4	5.9	2.7	10.0	39.5	11.2	2.7	0.6
Bedsted	9.7	2.0	2.7	2.7	1.0	2.0	3.5	16.8	15.6	42.8	1.0	0.2
Øster Højst	8.4	2.1	4.6	1.3	0.2	5.0	4.2	38.9	10.9	23.0	1.0	0.4
Agerskov	8.9	4.3	4.7	2.6	0.8	3.6	3.0	7.5	22.9	40.3	0.9	0.4
Arrild	12.8	6.5	5.3	2.4	1.9	3.4	4.1	6.3	20.3	35.4	1.5	0.0
Brøns	14.1	8.8	7.7	3.3	1.6	10.6	2.2	4.0	38.0	7.1	1.6	1.1
Toftlund	15.3	2.3	3.8	2.8	0.9	10.5	3.9	5.9	30.7	22.3	1.1	0.3
Døstrup	12.5	9.7	5.5	1.8	0.6	3.3	3.0	6.4	46.5	9.7	0.3	0.6
Branderup	13.4	4.2	5.7	2.1	1.4	5.7	5.7	9.5	18.4	32.2	1.4	0.4
Tønder	16.8	7.7	1.9	8.2	0.4	11.7	2.0	15.6	24.4	9.1	1.8	0.5
Abild	12.4	4.9	6.4	4.6	0.8	6.0	3.1	17.4	20.8	22.1	1.3	0.2
Hostrup	11.7	8.3	3.6	6.5	0.7	12.6	3.8	22.7	13.4	14.8	1.1	0.7
Rømø	20.6	3.9	6.7	1.9	0.6	2.5	3.6	8.1	37.5	13.1	1.7	0.0
Vodder	12.0	6.8	5.7	2.3	0.9	6.0	2.6	5.1	45.3	10.5	1.7	1.1
Skærbæk	10.5	7.6	3.9	1.8	0.1	3.3	1.8	3.8	60.0	5.8	1.1	0.4

== Results ==
Party		Votes	%	+/-	Seats	+/-
Tønder Municipality
T	Tønder Listen	5,906	29.01	New	9	New
V	Venstre	3,472	17.06	-27.52	6	-9
A	Social Democrats	3,010	14.79	-5.82	5	-1
S	Schleswig Party	2,706	13.29	+7.45	4	+2
L	Borgerlisten	1,509	7.41	+2.99	3	+2
C	Conservatives	1,115	5.48	+2.77	2	+1
F	Green Left	805	3.95	+0.48	1	0
D	New Right	747	3.67	+3.00	1	+1
O	Danish People's Party	573	2.82	-7.62	0	-3
Ø	Red-Green Alliance	282	1.39	-0.88	0	-1
I	Liberal Alliance	152	0.75	-2.03	0	-1
Å	The Alternative	78	0.38	-0.51	0	0
Total		20,355	100	N/A	31	N/A
Invalid votes		119	0.40	+0.14		
Blank votes		256	0.86	-0.17		
Turnout		20,730	69.81	-2.16		
Source: valg.dk
