= The Music and Theater Folk High School =

School in Toftlund, Denmark

Coordinates: 55°11′28″N 9°03′58″E

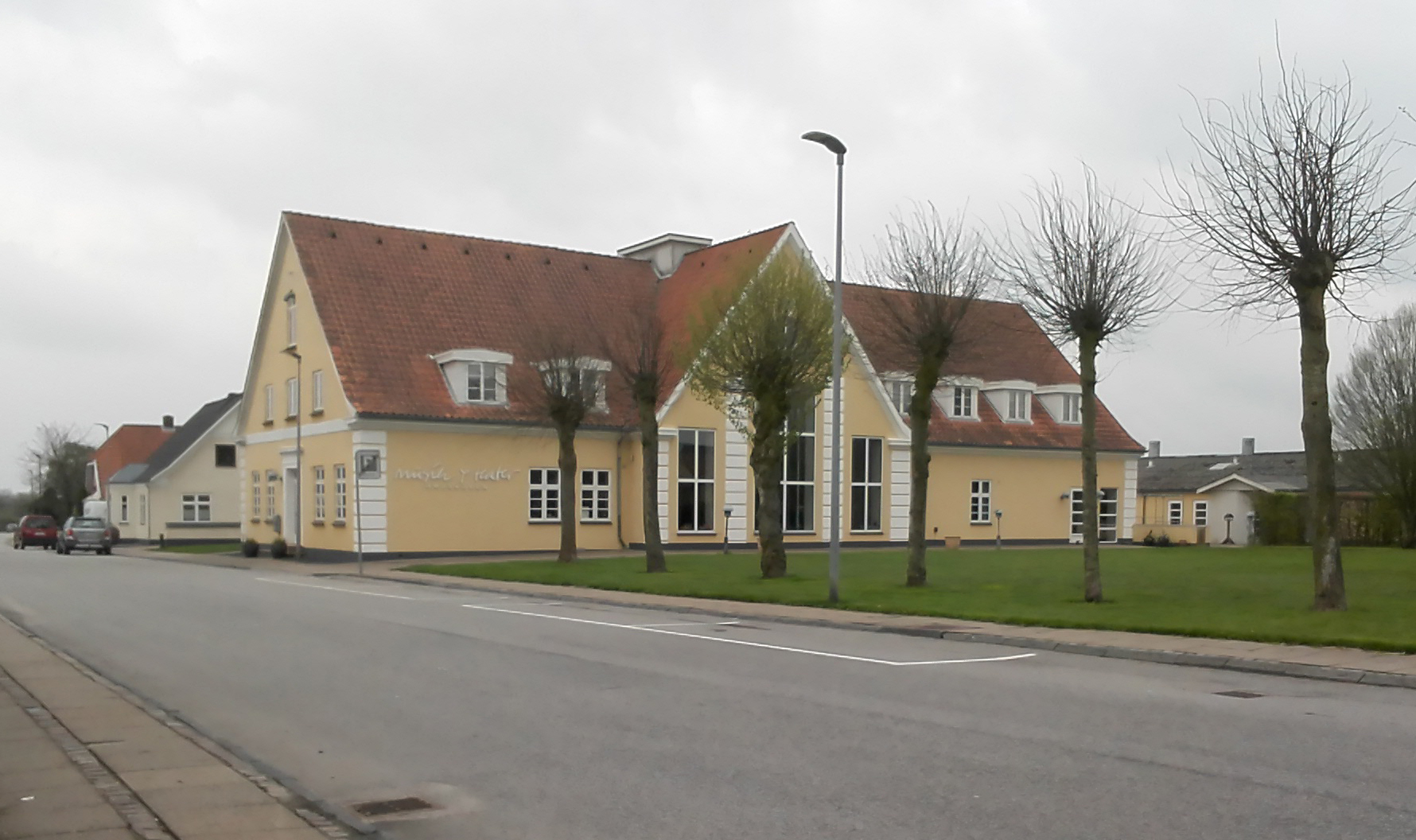
The Music and Theater Folk High School, Main Building

The Music and Theater Folk High School (Danish: Musik og Teaterhøjskolen) was a Danish folk high school in Toftlund, Denmark, which specialized in the performing arts. Like many folk high schools today, it prepared many young people (from 18 years of age) for higher education in the performing arts, while maintaining the folk high school tradition of having no requirements for entrance or graduation exams.

== History ==
Music and Theater Folk High School was founded in 1984 by politician and musician Henrik Svane and Lars Bo Smith as the South Jutlandic Folk High School for Music and Theater (Danish: Den Sønderjyske Højskole for musik og teater), but changed its name in 2000. The school has room for up to 70 students. The main school buildings and dorms are located on an old dairy farm. The school opened in July 1984, with an official ceremony led by Queen Mother Ingrid following in November 1984. There was also a song, In Our Hearts Begin (Danish: I hjerterne begynder) commissioned for the opening with text by Thorkild Bjørnvig and music by Christian Alvad. It is currently included in the højskolesangbogen.

== Performing Arts Hall ==
Shortly after the school opened, plans were begun on a performance hall designed by Carston Hoff and Susanne Ussing. The 500 square meter hall has room for over 300 people and is host to a variety of cultural activities, including rock, classical and jazz concerts, comedy acts, theatrical plays and talks.

== The School Today ==
The school started with two main subjects, music and theater, but has since expanded to include subjects in the performing arts such as electronic music, singing, dance, audio engineering and contemporary circus. Many of the teachers at the school are active as performing artists in their respective fields. It is one of the few surviving folk high schools in the Southern Jutland region of Denmark. Many students used their time at the school as a preparation for formal studies in their fields, for example universities, theater schools, conservatories and special Danish music preparatory schools] (Danish: musikalsk grundkursus, or MGK).

In 2022, due to economic difficulties and a low student sign-up, the school went bankrupt and was forced to close its doors.

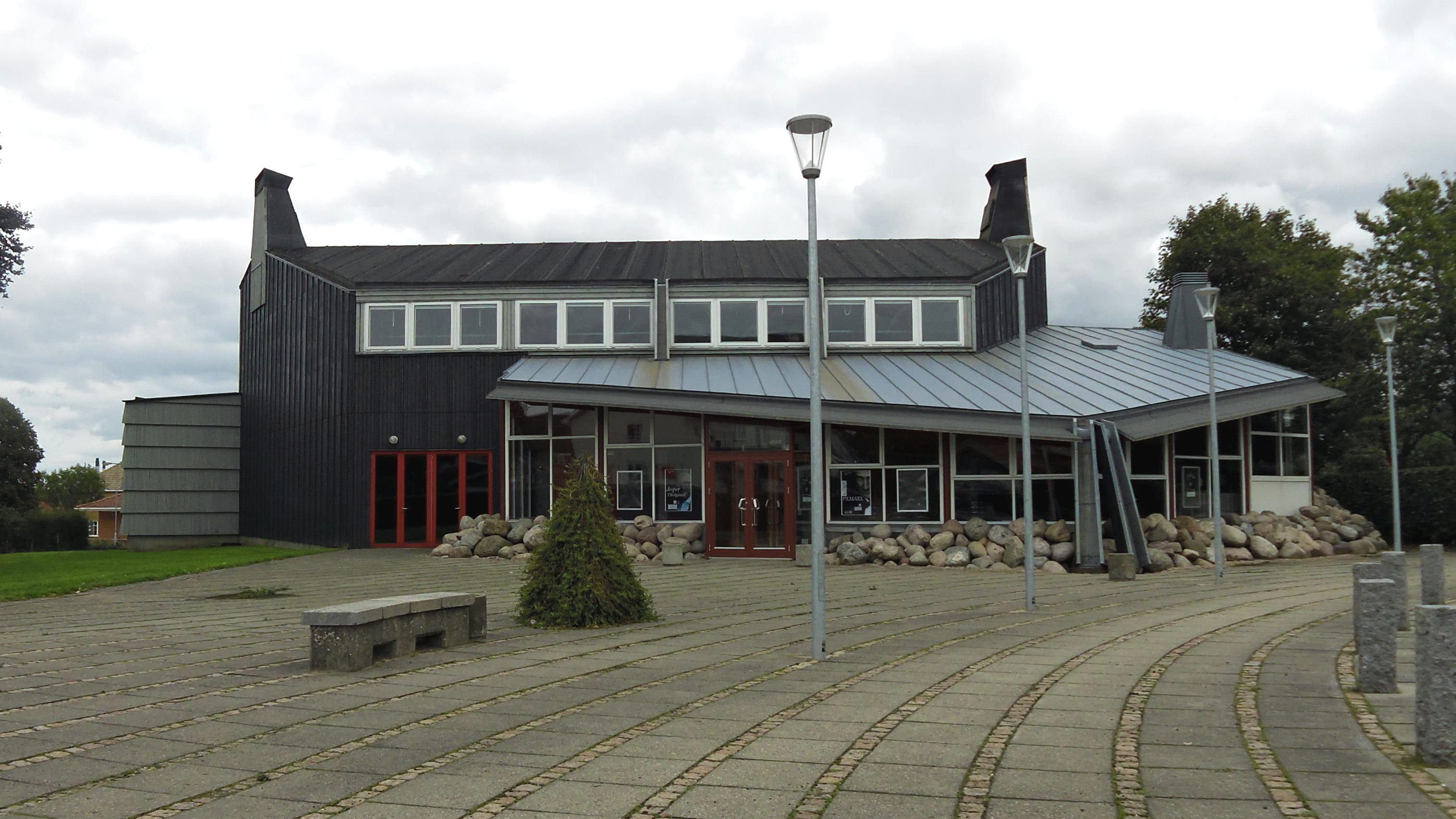
Performing Arts Hall
