= Conrad Fehr =

Danish-German painter and sculptor (1854–1933)

Conrad Fehr (November 19, 1854 – June 22, 1933) was a German-Danish painter and sculptor.

== Life ==
Conrad Heinrich Franz Fehr was born in the Danish village of Toftlund in 1854, ten years before it became a part of German Prussia after the Second Schleswig War. Fehr studied from 1877 to 1881 at the Academy of Fine Arts in Munich under the professors Gyula Benczúr, Alois Gabl, and Ludwig von Löfftz. Long study trips to the Netherlands, Belgium, Denmark and Paris followed. In 1882 he moved to Berlin, where from 1885 he taught at the drawing school of the Association of Berlin Artists.

Fehr had his debut as a sculptor in 1896 at the Great Berlin Art Exhibition, where, after completing his teaching career, he was a regular guest as a painter. In 1884 he received a bronze medal in London. After the First World War he was in Copenhagen for a long time, where he carried out various orders for portraits. He died in 1933 in Berlin.

== Fehr Academy ==
From 1892 until 1912, Fehr ran his own private academy on Lützowstrasse 82 in Berlin. Artists such as Walter Leistikow, Adolf Brütt and Gustav Eilers taught at the school.

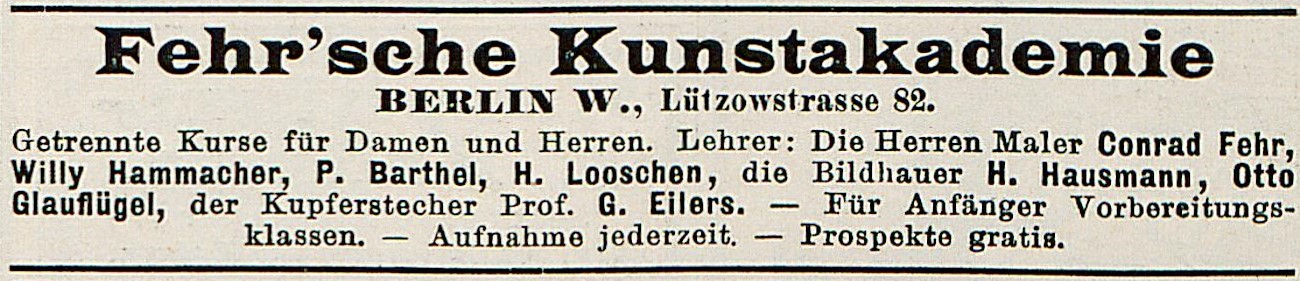
Fehr'sche Kunstakademie 1897

== Reputation ==
Conrad Fehr primarily made a name for himself as a teacher at his academy, but his genre pictures and religious scenes as well as the numerous portraits and landscapes show him as a remarkable artist.

== Examples of works ==
- Vorfrühling (Tauwetter)
- Portrait of Peter Wilhelm Forchhammer (1882)
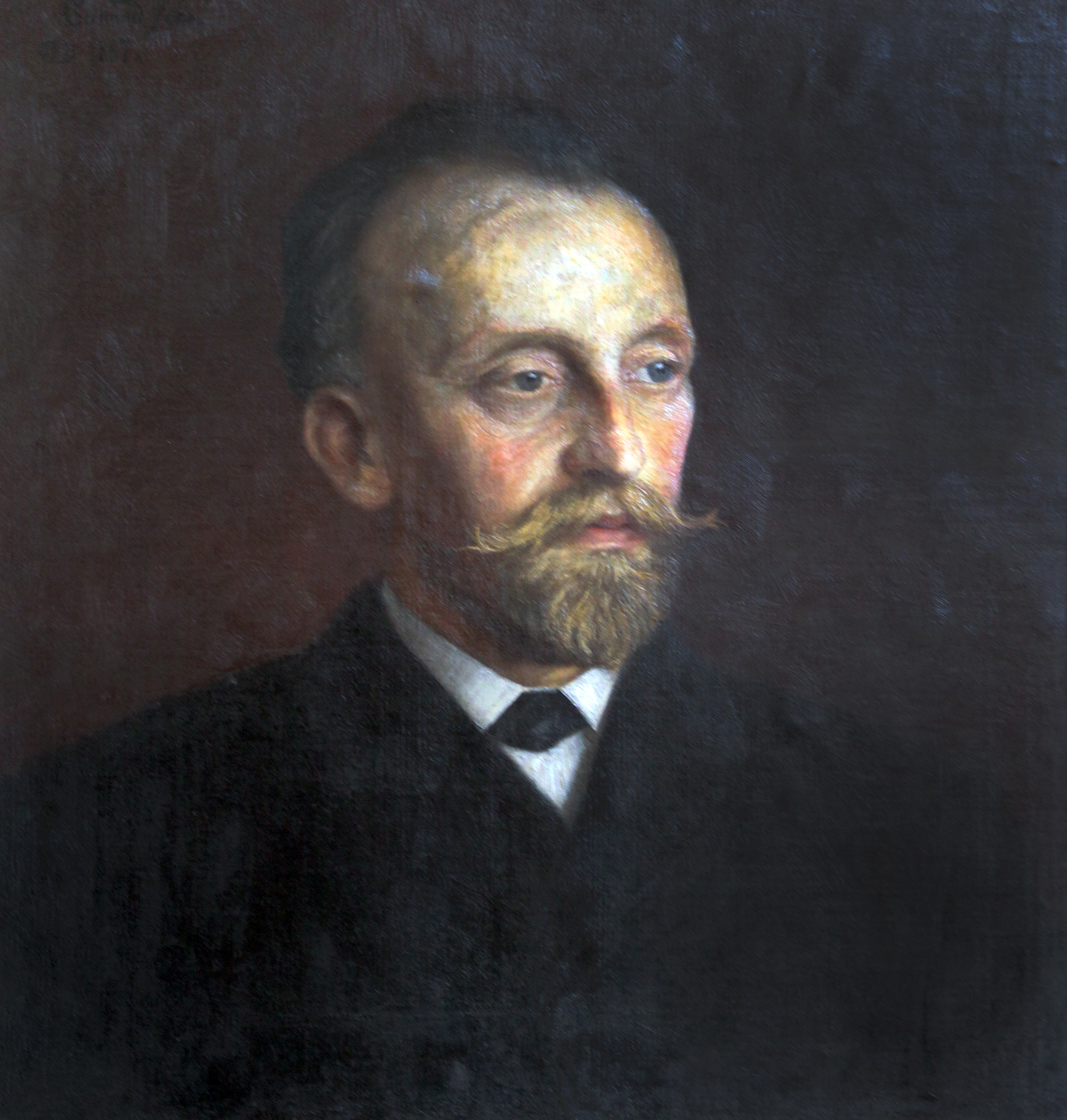
1887 Portrait of Heinrich Sauermann

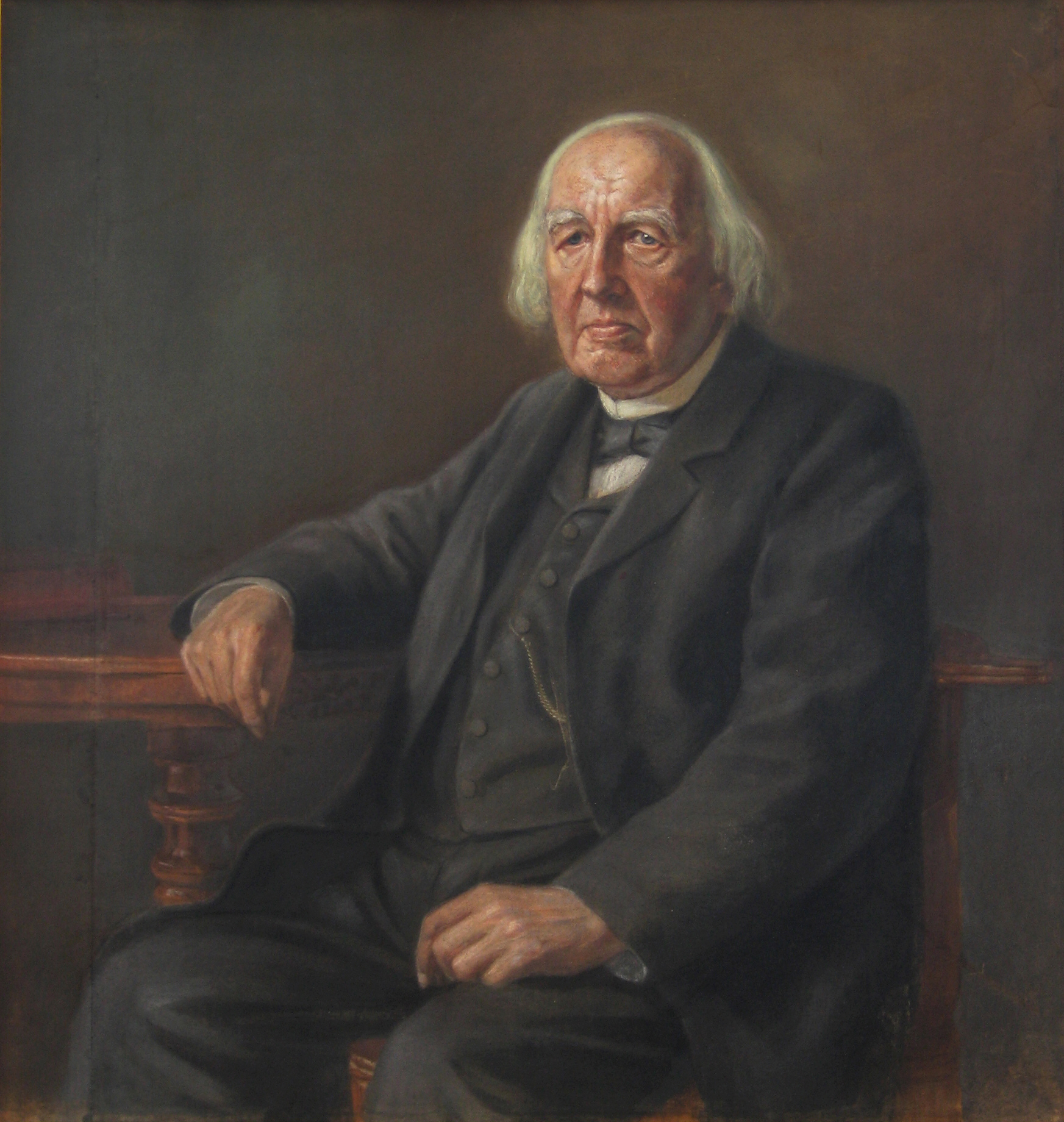
Portrait of Karl Weierstrass

== Literature ==
- Heidrun Lorenzen (Hrsg.): Dora Koch-Stetter: Wege nach Ahrenshoop. Lukas Verlag, Berlin 2001, ISBN 3-931836-65-7, S. 18.
- Ulrich Schulte-Wülwer: Kieler Künstler. Band 2: Kunstleben in der Kaiserzeit 1871–1918. Boyens, Heide 2016, ISBN 978-3-8042-1442-2, S. 301–308.
