= Tønder Listen =

Tønder Listen Tønder Listen
- Leader: Anita Uggerholt Eriksen
- Founded: 2020
- Split from: Venstre
- Headquarters: Tønder
- Ideology: Centre-right
- Colors: Orange
- Municipal councils: 9 / 31 (Note: Of Seats in Tønder municipal council)

Tønder Listen is a Danish local political party from Tønder Municipality.

== History ==
In 2020 Henrik Frandsen lost the support from Venstre to stand for re-election as mayor in the 2021 Tønder municipal election. This resulted in Henrik Frandsen, who was mayor at the time for Venstre, to leave the party and create Tønder Listen. 5 other city council members from Venstre would join the party, while 9 would stay at Venstre.

In the 2021 Tønder municipal election the party would become biggest party with 29% of the vote and 9 seats, while Venstre would lose 9 seats. However, there was no majority to support Henrik Frandsen as mayor.

Henrik Frandsen would later join the Moderates nationally, and stepped down as leader of Tønder Listen. He would locally remain a party member, however Anita Uggerholt Eriksen would become leader.

== Election results ==
=== Municipal elections ===
Date	Votes		Seats	±
Date	#	%	Seats	±
2021	5,906	29.0	9 / 31	
