= Ulrich Schulte-Wülwer =

German art historian

Ulrich Schulte-Wülwer is a German art historian, specializing in north German painters of the 19th and 20th centuries.

== Life ==
Schulte-Wülwer holds the position of Honorary Professor at the Christian Albrechts Universität zu Kiel. Schulte-Wülwer is listed in the Deutsche Biographie, Dictionary of National Biography.

== Selected works ==
- Das Nibelungenlied in der deutschen Kunst und Kunstliteratur zwischen 1806 und 1871. Philosophische Fakultät der Universität Kiel, Dissertation, 1974.
- Das Nibelungenlied in der deutschen Kunst des 19. und 20. Jahrhunderts (= Kunstwissenschaftliche Untersuchungen des Ulmer Vereins, Verband für Kunst- und Kulturwissenschaften. Bd. 9). Anabas, Gießen 1980, ISBN 3-87038-069-1 (zugleich: Kiel, Universität, Dissertation, 1974).
- (editor) Käte Lassen (1880–1956). Städtisches Museum Flensburg. Begleitheft anlässlich der Ausstellung im Städtischen Museum, 2.11.–7.12.1980. Städtisches Museum, Flensburg 1980.
- Schleswig-Holstein in der Malerei des 19. Jahrhunderts. Hrsg. von der Brandkasse-Provinzial-Versicherungsgruppe, Kiel. Boyens, Heide 1980, ISBN 3-8042-0247-0.
- Bildführer. Städtisches Museum Flensburg. Städtisches Museum, Flensburg 1981.
- Herbert Marxen (1900–1954). Ein Flensburger Karikaturist in den letzten Jahren der Weimarer Republik. Ausstellung im Städtischen Museum Flensburg vom 17.10.–28.11.1982/im Kieler Stadt- und Schiffahrtsmuseum vom 30.1.–27 March 1983. [hrsg. vom Städt. Museum Flensburg], Städtisches Museum, Flensburg 1982.
- Künstlerkolonie Ekensund am Nordufer der Flensburger Förde. Boyens, Heide 2000.
- Föhr, Amrum und die Halligen in der Kunst. Boyens, Heide 2003; völlig überarbeitete Neuausgabe 2012, ISBN 978-3-8042-1346-3.
- Künstlerinsel Sylt. Boyens, Heide 2005, ISBN 3-804-21171-2.
- "Der Mann verdient Beachtung." Die Wiederentdeckung des Malers Sophus Hansen. Zur Ausstellung des Malers Sophus Hansen in Schloss Glücksburg vom 4. bis 29. Oktober 2009: Sophus Hansen – ein Malerleben zwischen Glücksburg, Hamburg und Weimar. Boyens, Heide 2009, ISBN 978-3-8042-1296-1.
- Sehnsucht nach Arkadien: Schleswig-Holsteinische Künstler in Italien. Boyens, Heide 2009, ISBN 978-3-8042-1284-8.

== Bibliography ==
- Marianne Risch-Stolz und Dorothee Bieske (ed.): 11:1. Finale Museumsberg Flensburg. Museumsberg Flensburg, Flensburg 2009 (anlässlich der Verabschiedung von Ulrich Schulte-Wülwer als Direktor des Museumsberges Flensburg im November 2009 erschienen).
