= Agerskov (town) =

- Town
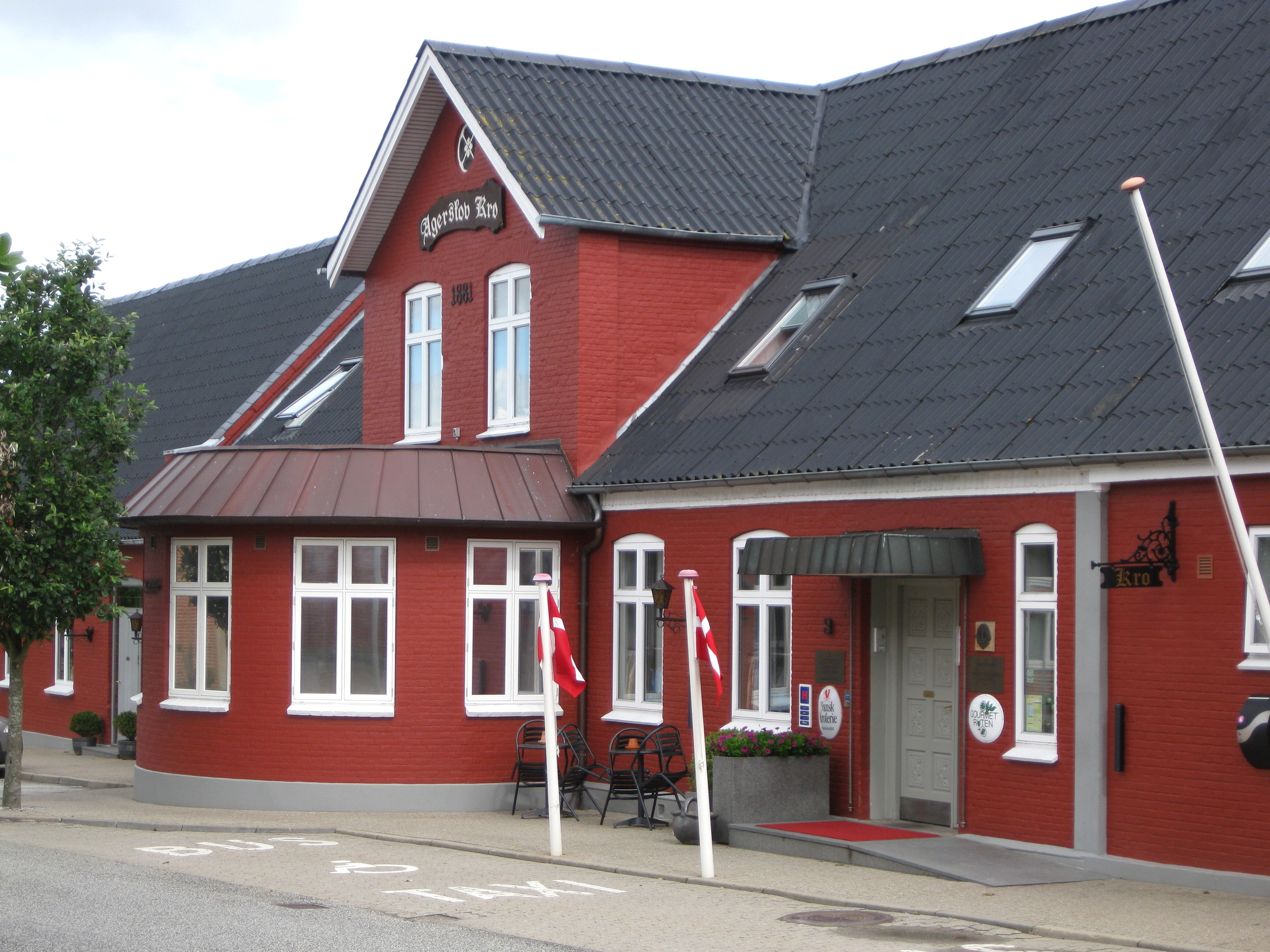
- Agerskov Inn

- Location in Region of Southern Denmark Agerskov (Denmark)
- Coordinates: 55°7′51″N 9°7′47″E
- Country: Denmark
- Region: Southern Denmark
- Municipality: Tønder Municipality

Area
  - Urban: 1.3 km^{2} (0.50 sq mi)

Population (2026)
  - Urban: 1,159
  - Urban density: 890/km^{2} (2,300/sq mi)
- Time zone: UTC+1 (CET)
  - Summer (DST): UTC+2 (CEST)
- Postal code: DK-6534 Agerskov

Agerskov (German: Aggerschau) is a town located in central Southern Jutland in Denmark with a population of 1,159 (1 January 2026). The town is located 9 km from Toftlund, 15 km from Løgumkloster and 16 km from Rødekro. The town is a part of Tønder Municipality, Region Syddanmark.

== Agerskov Inn ==
The town is best known throughout Denmark for its inn, Agerskov Inn (Danish: Agerskov Kro), which enjoyed royal privileges from 1767. It has and still functions today as a gathering place, or ting, for inhabitants throughout all of Southern Jutland. It has been restored regularly since 1981.

== Agerskov Ungdomsskole ==
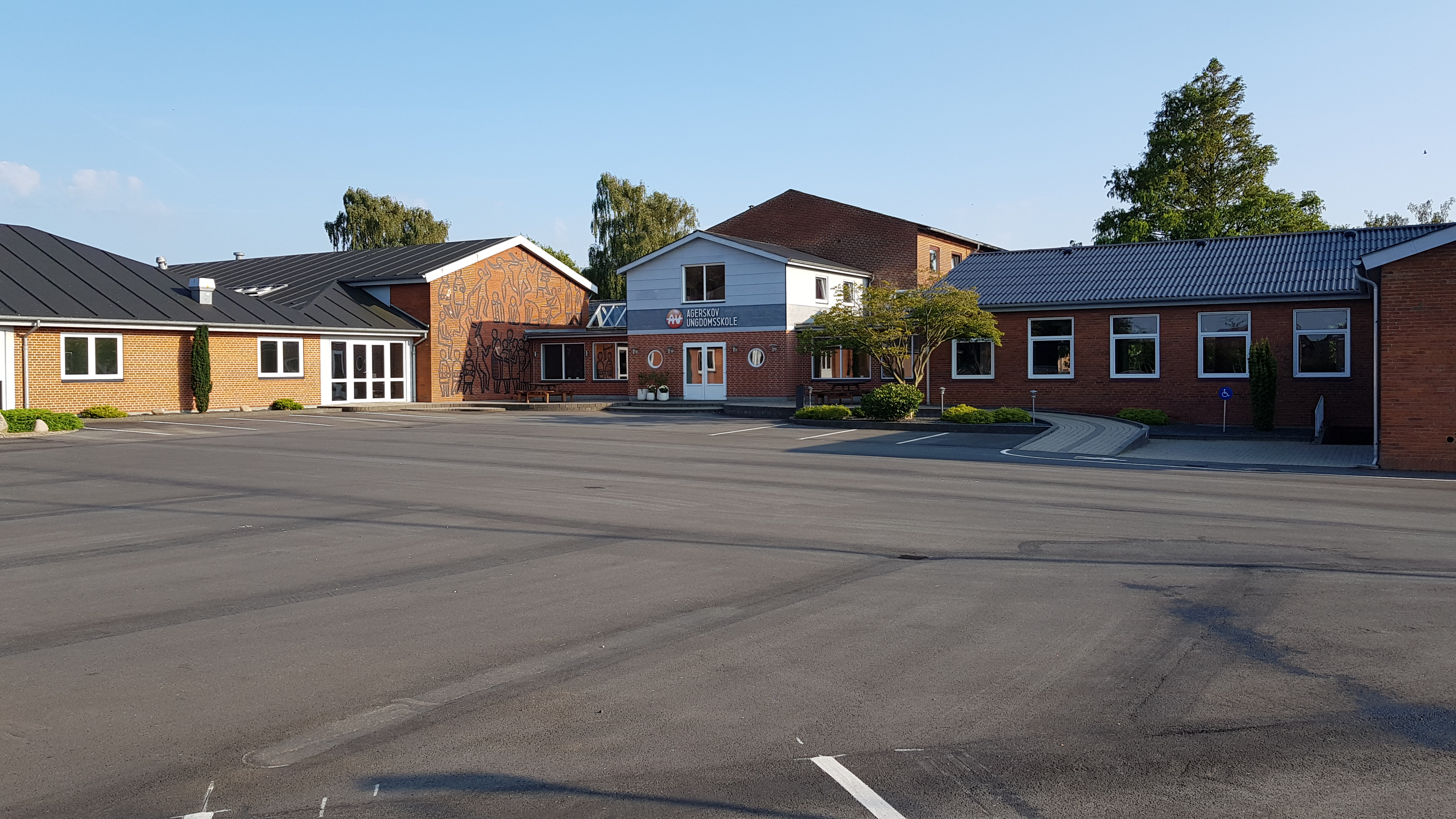
Agerskov Ungdomsskole

The town also boasts the first Danish youth school (ungdomsskole) in Southern Jutland, Agerskov Ungdomsskole. Opened in 1919, it was an alternative to the Danish schools on the other side of the border. The school still functions as a boarding school today.

== Agerskov Church ==
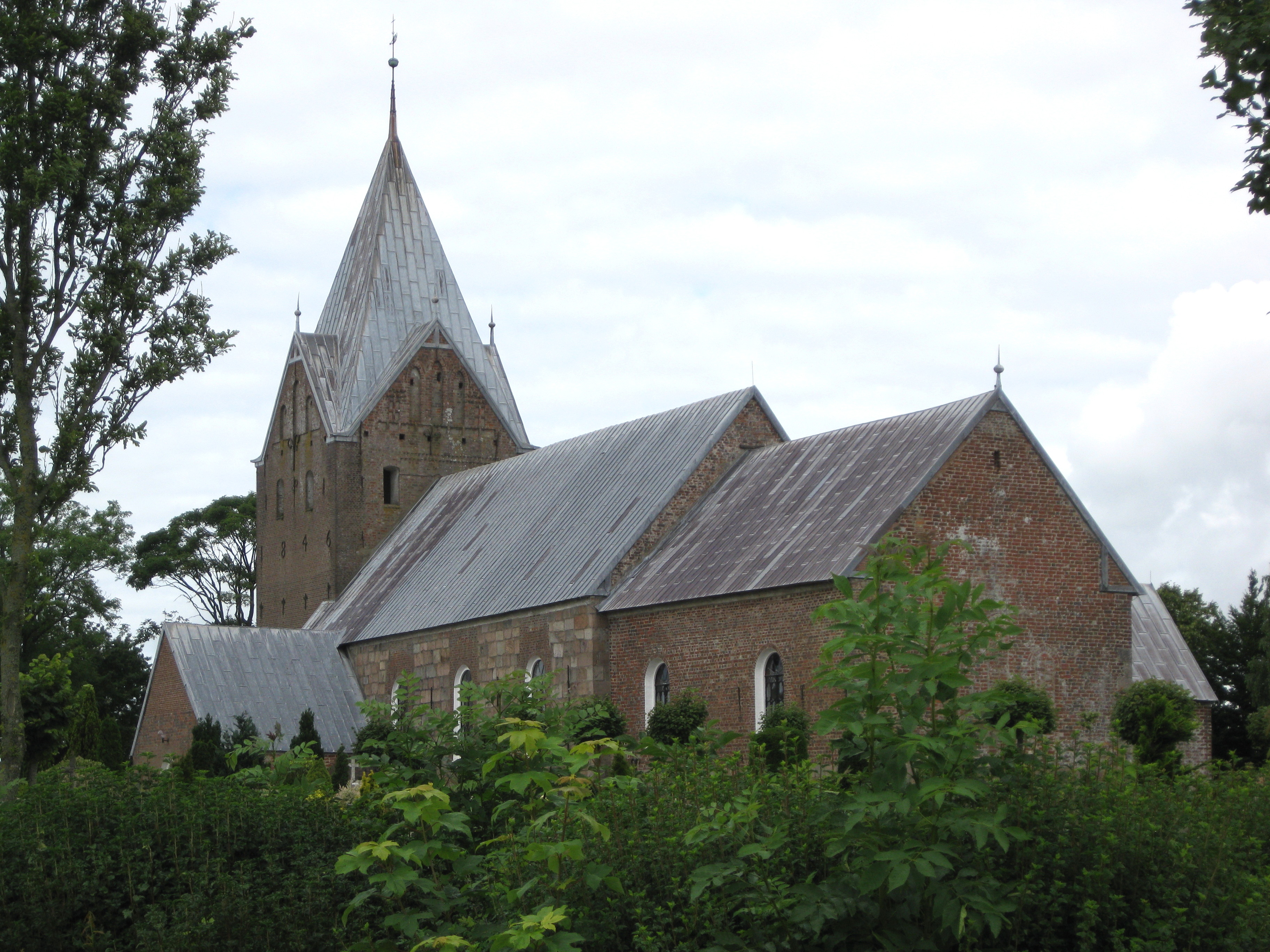
Agerskov Church

Agerskov Church is a Romanesque church made of ashlar built around 1200 with extensions added in 1300 and again in 1500. The church features a peculiar type of spire known especially from the region previously connected to Tørning Mill, where the spire is just above four triangle-shaped gables.

== Notable people ==
- Frank Erichsen (born 20 September 1983) - from DR2's program Bonderøven
- Ole Birk Olesen (born 21 December 1972) - member of Parliament and the political party Liberal Alliance
- Tommy Ahlers (born 18 November 1975) member of Parliament and the political party Venstre.

== Gallery ==
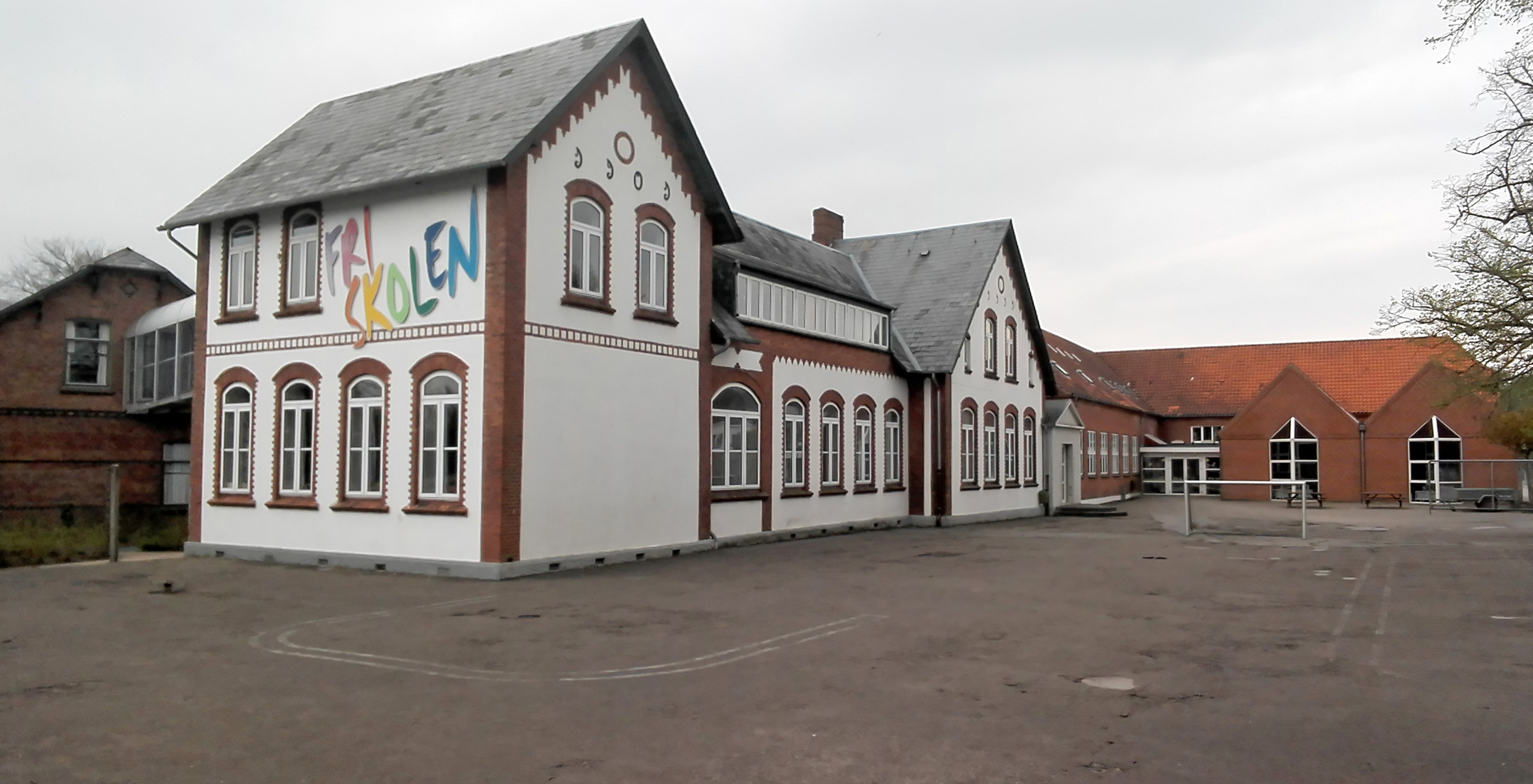
Agerskov Christian Free School

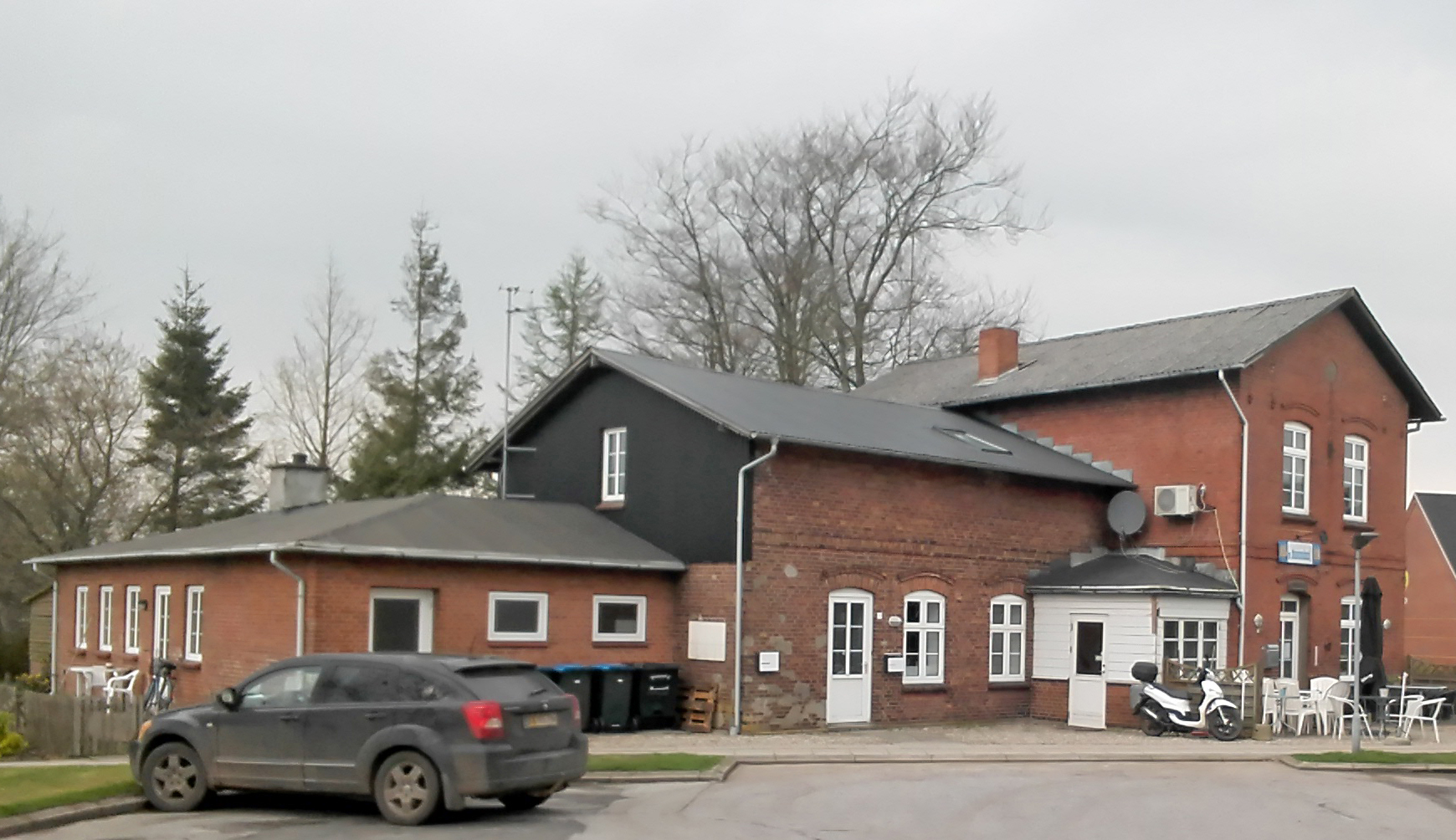
The former Agerskov Station, now a pub

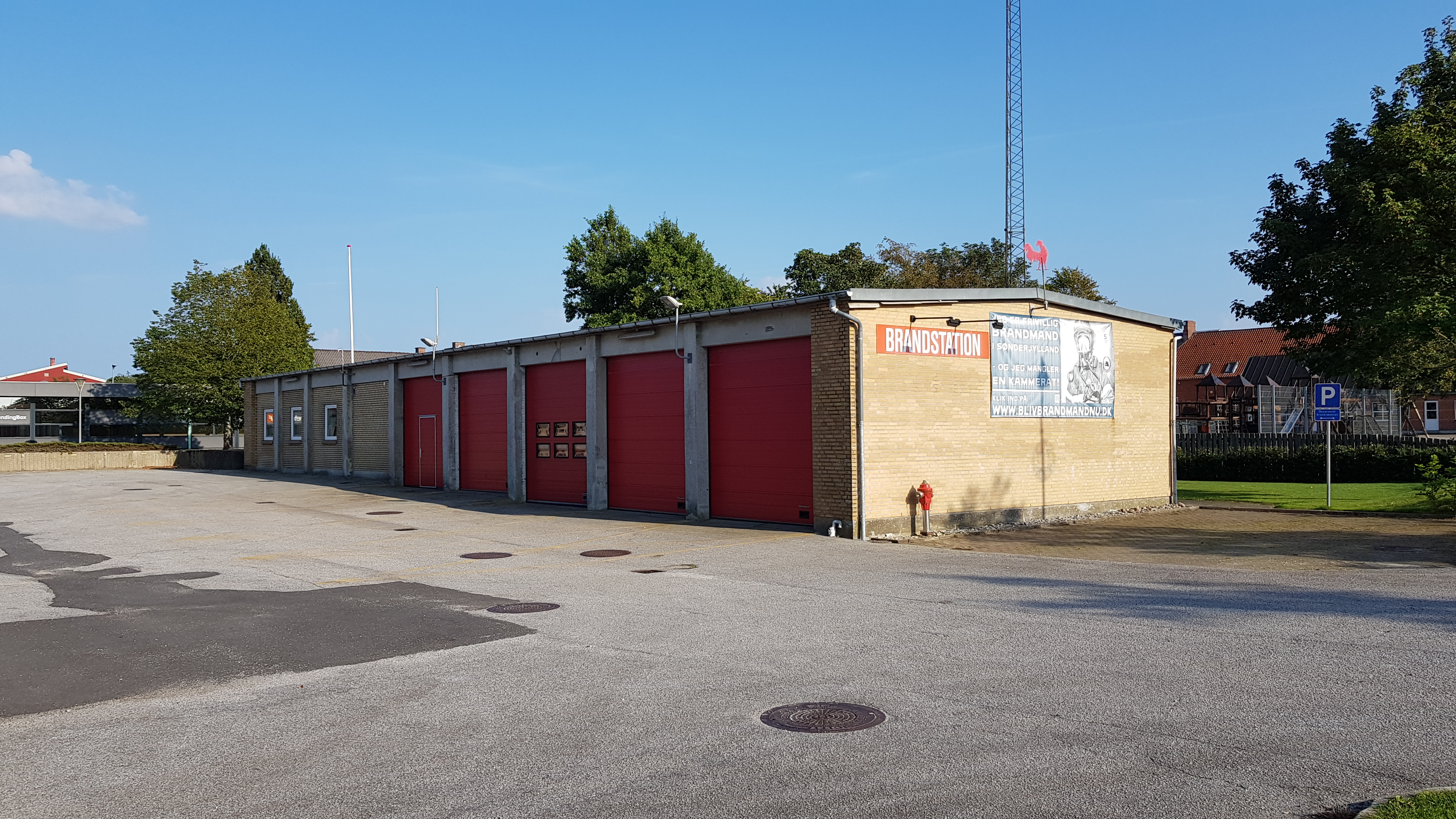
Agerskov fire station

== External references ==
- Agerskov Kro
- Tønder Kommune
