= Toftlund =

Danish town

- Town
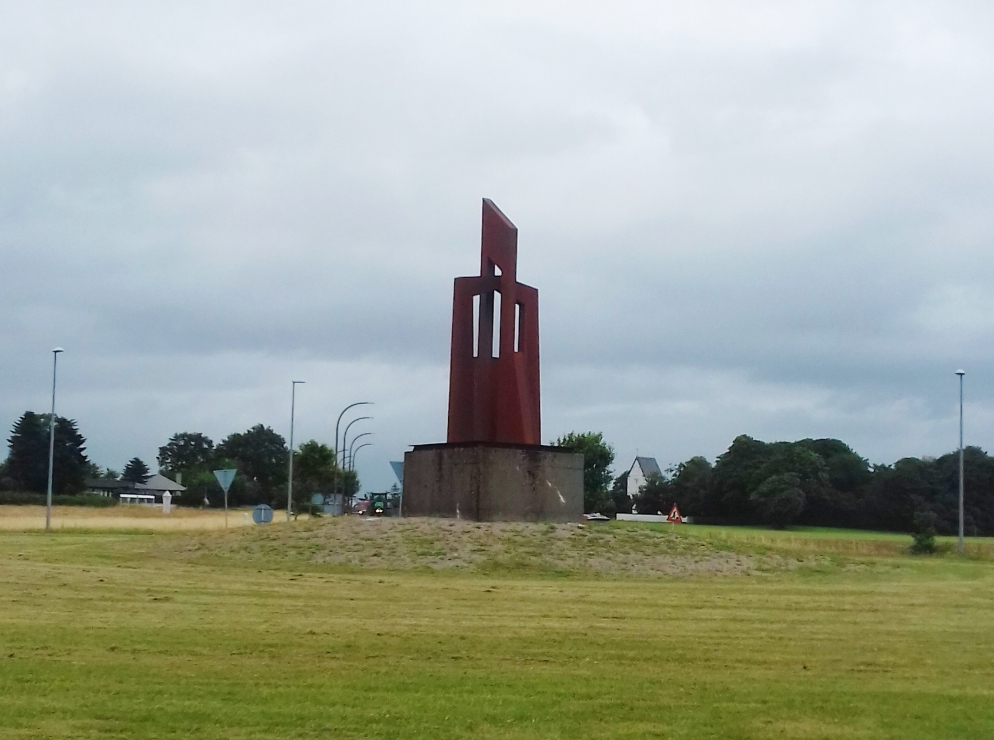
- Clipsen, sculpture by Günther Scharbach

- Location in Denmark Toftlund (Region of Southern Denmark)
- Coordinates: 55°11′16″N 9°4′24″E
- Country: Denmark
- Region: Southern Denmark
- Municipality: Tønder Municipality

Area
  - Urban: 2.93 km^{2} (1.13 sq mi)

Population (2026)
  - Urban: 3,252
  - Urban density: 1,110/km^{2} (2,870/sq mi)
  - Gender: 1,587 males and 1,665 females
- Time zone: UTC+1 (CET)
  - Summer (DST): UTC+2 (CEST)
- Postal code: DK-6520 Toftlund

Toftlund is a town in South Jutland with a population of 3,252 (1. January 2026). It is a part of Tønder Municipality and Region of Southern Denmark. It is located on the southern edge of Toftlund Till Deposit (Danish: Toftlund bakkeø) in the center of South Jutland. It lies 35 km northeast of Tønder and 30 km northwest of Aabenraa.

The town has an active network of various institutions, including a municipal school, a church, a sports complex with outdoor swimming pool, golf course, a private school, boarding school, a folk high school specializing in music and theater (The Music and Theater Folk High School), a public library, a movie theater, as well as a variety of shops and food options. A performance hall designed by Carsten Hoff and Susanne Ussing is attached to the folk high school and is host to various cultural activities, including jazz concerts, comedy acts, theatrical plays and talks. It is also host to the annual Toftlund Lydfest, a one-day festival for improvised music.

== History ==
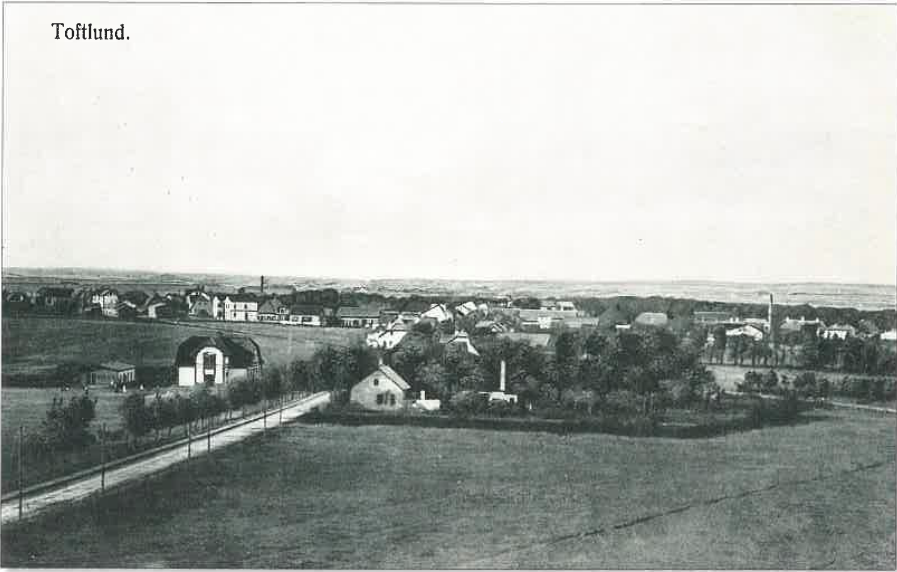
Toftlund from the south, 1916

The town known as Toftlund today was historically two towns, Herrested (to the south, organized around the church, which dates to around 1100) and Toftlund to the north, but they eventually grew together. From 1864 to 1920, like the rest of Southern Jutland, Toftlund was a part of Prussia. But it first in 1870 that it became more than a few houses and farms. The Prussians needed an administrative center and chose Toftlund as the site for a new town where they could house and employ German administrators from the south. Many of the buildings in Toftlund survive from this time, with many being built in a German style. From 1904 to 1939, Toftlund had a train station that connected it to nearby Haderslev. There are bunkers in the forest from the first world war which were a part of a network of bunkers (Security Position North) across Southern Jutland. Before the Municipal Reform of 2007, Toftlund was the administrative center of Nørre-Rangstrup Municipality.

== Music and Theater House ==
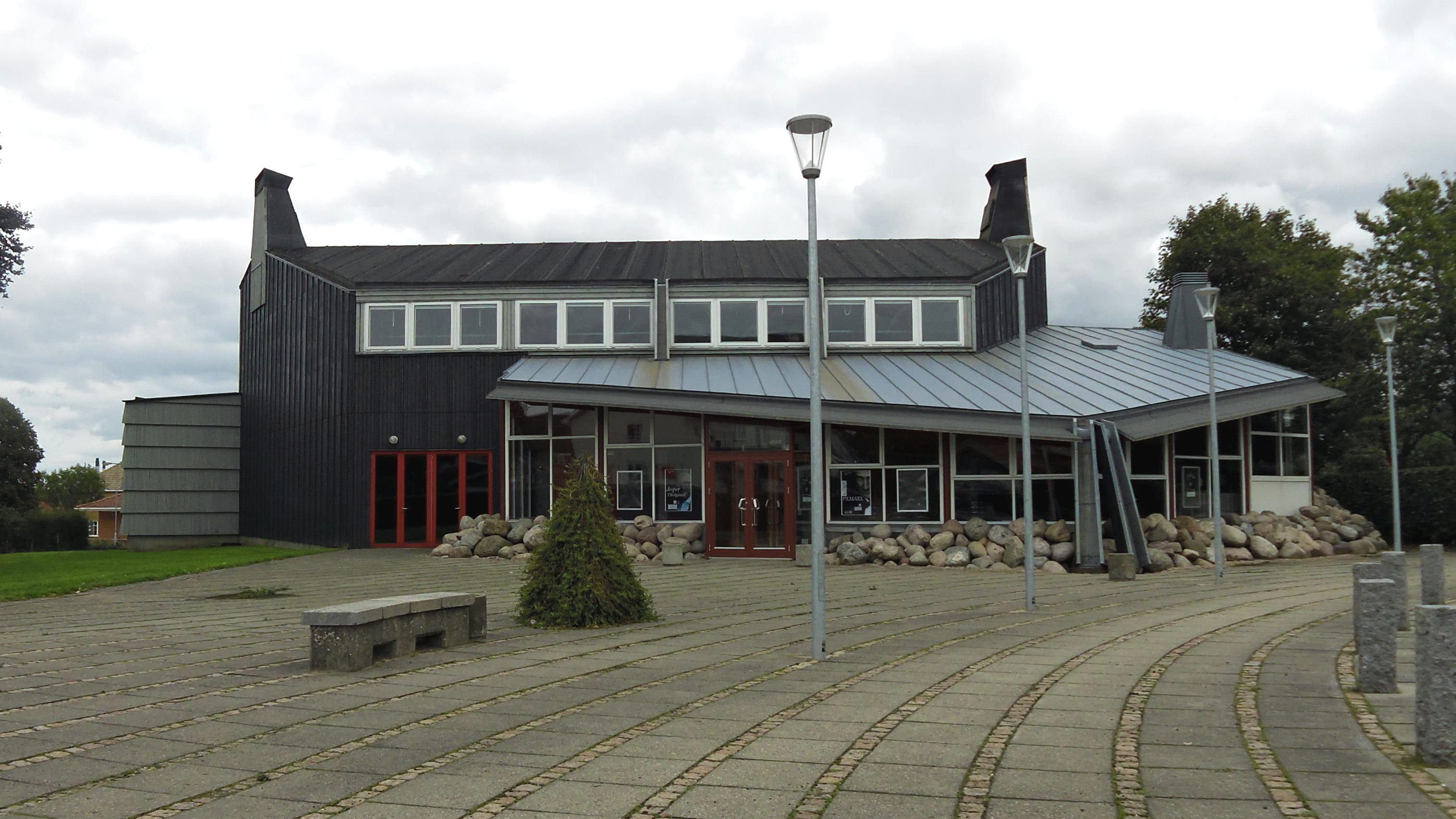
Toftlund's Music and Theater Performance House

In 1990, as an extension of the folk high school, plans were completed for the construction of performance hall in the center of Toftlund. The architect Carsten Hoff and Susanne Ussing were hired to design it, and construction was completed in 1990. The building is made mainly of wood, but with a frame and walls of cement. The total area is 1430 m2, including a foyer and second basement stage for theater productions.

== Brundtland City ==
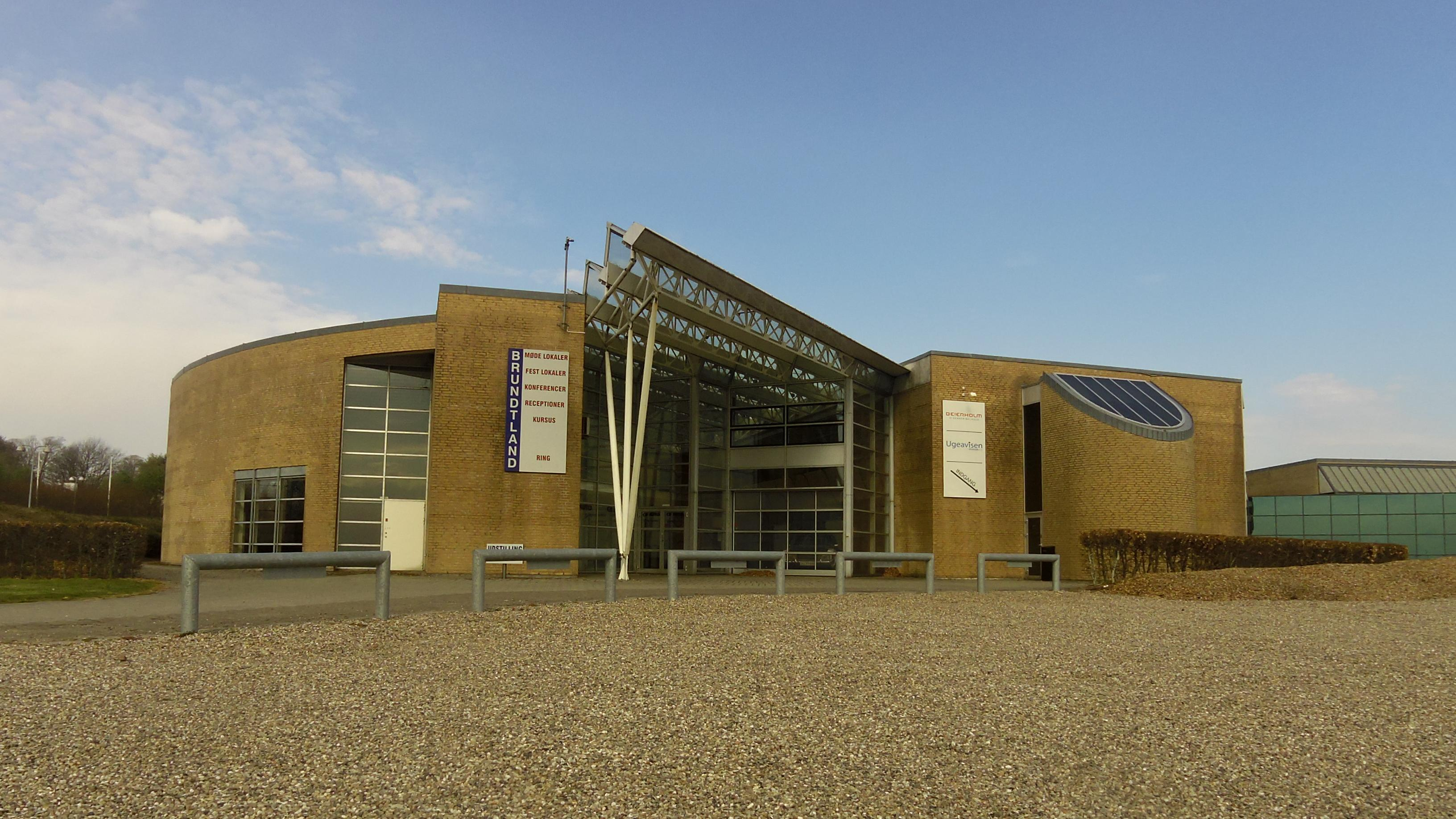
Brundtland Center

In 1990, Toftlund started an EU-supported project on energy efficiency in partnership with the German town Bredstedt in the border state of Schleswig-Holstein. Toftlund was declared Denmark's first Brundtland city by the Brundtland Commission. The Brundtland Center was built with the funds. Located at the southern end of the town, the center housed several different companies dedicated to producing energy efficient products.

== Development Plan Toftlund ==
In 2018, Tønder Municipality approved 17 million Danish kroner for a renewal project for the city of Toftlund. The plans are to be developed together with the various organizations within Toftlund, with the aim being to make Toftlund a more desirable place to live and raise a family. The former city council was disbanded and replaced with a new council with representatives from the various segments of society. The entire project is set for completion by 2030.

== Street Art ==
In 2022, the local board of development decided to launch a public works project focusing on street art.

== Notable people ==
- Artist Conrad Heinrich Franz Fehr (born 19 November 1854; died 22 June 1933 in Berlin)
- Frode Sørensen (born 1946) a Danish politician, was Tax Minister 2000-2001 and a Member of Parliament (Folketinget) 1998-2007

== Gallery ==
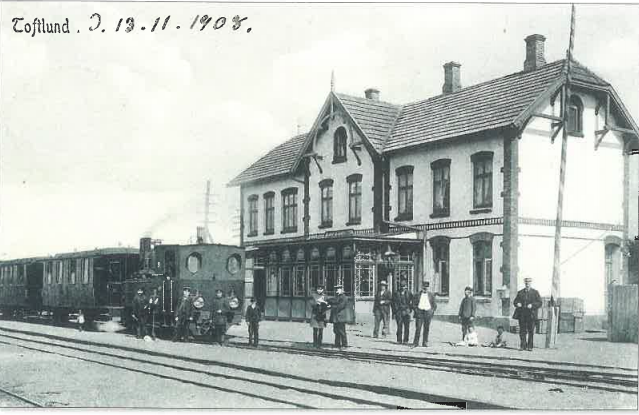
Toftlund Train Station 1908

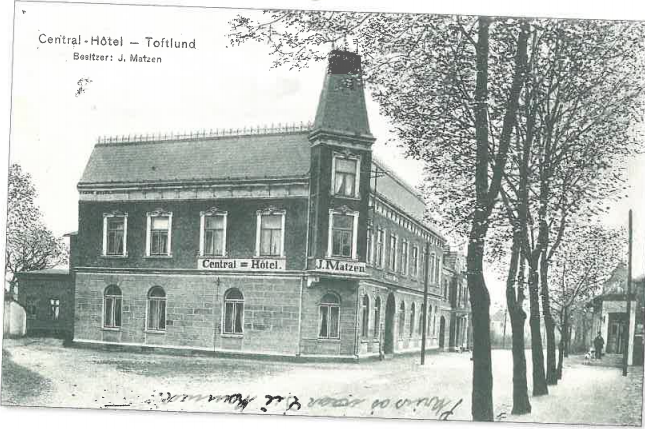
Central Hotel, Toftlund (1913)

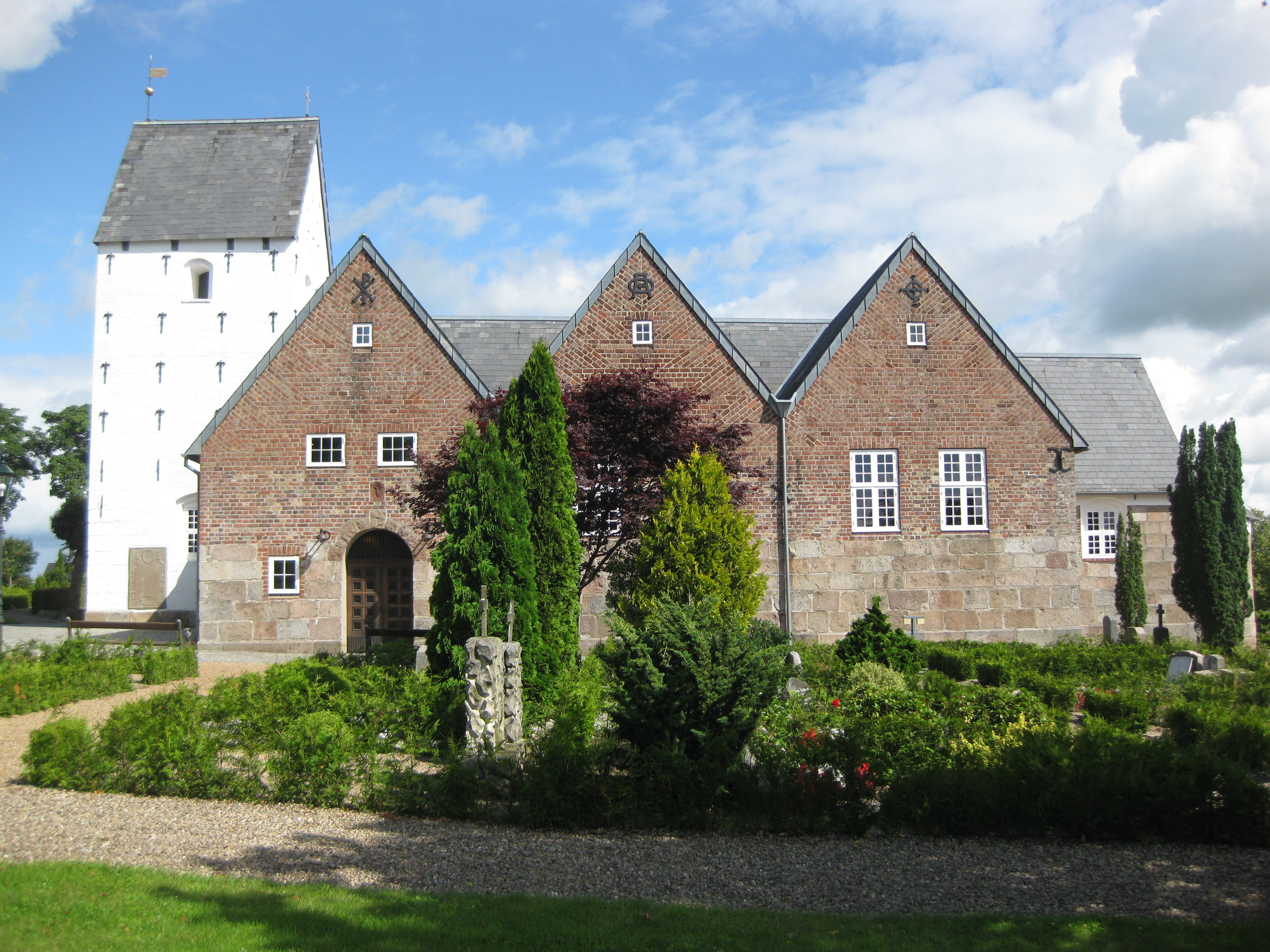
Toftlund Church

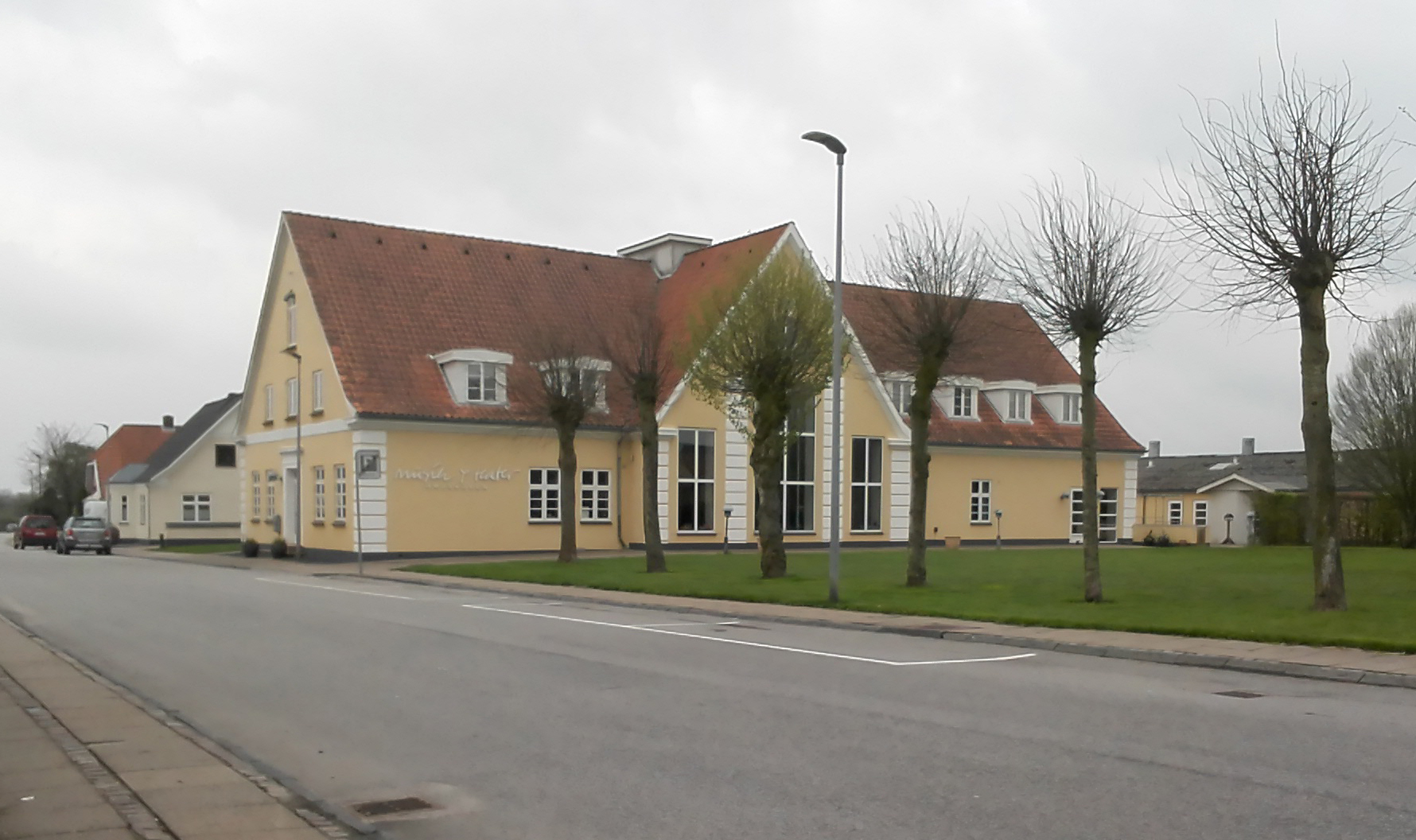
Toftlund Music and Theater Folk High School

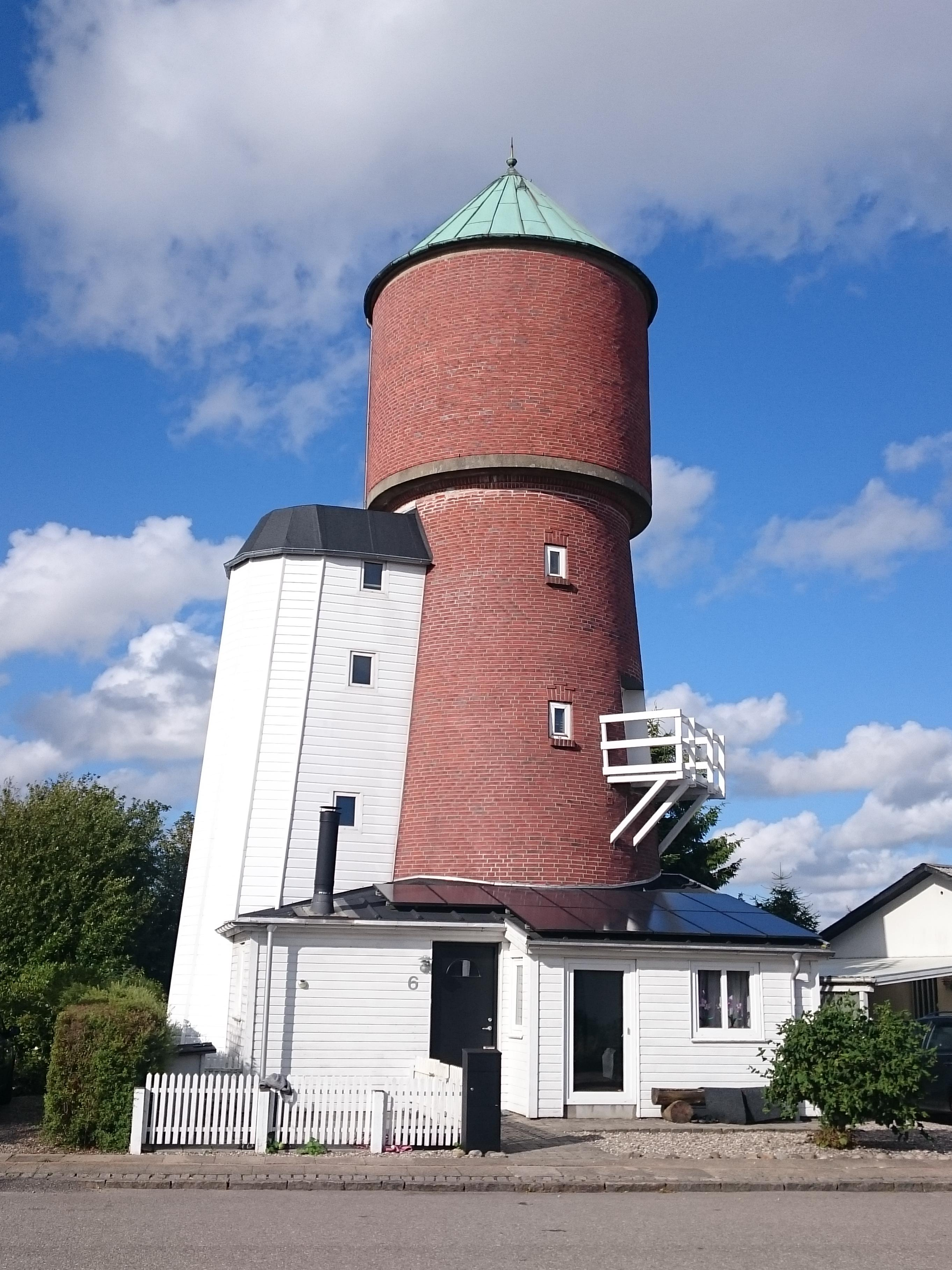
Toftlund's Water Tower

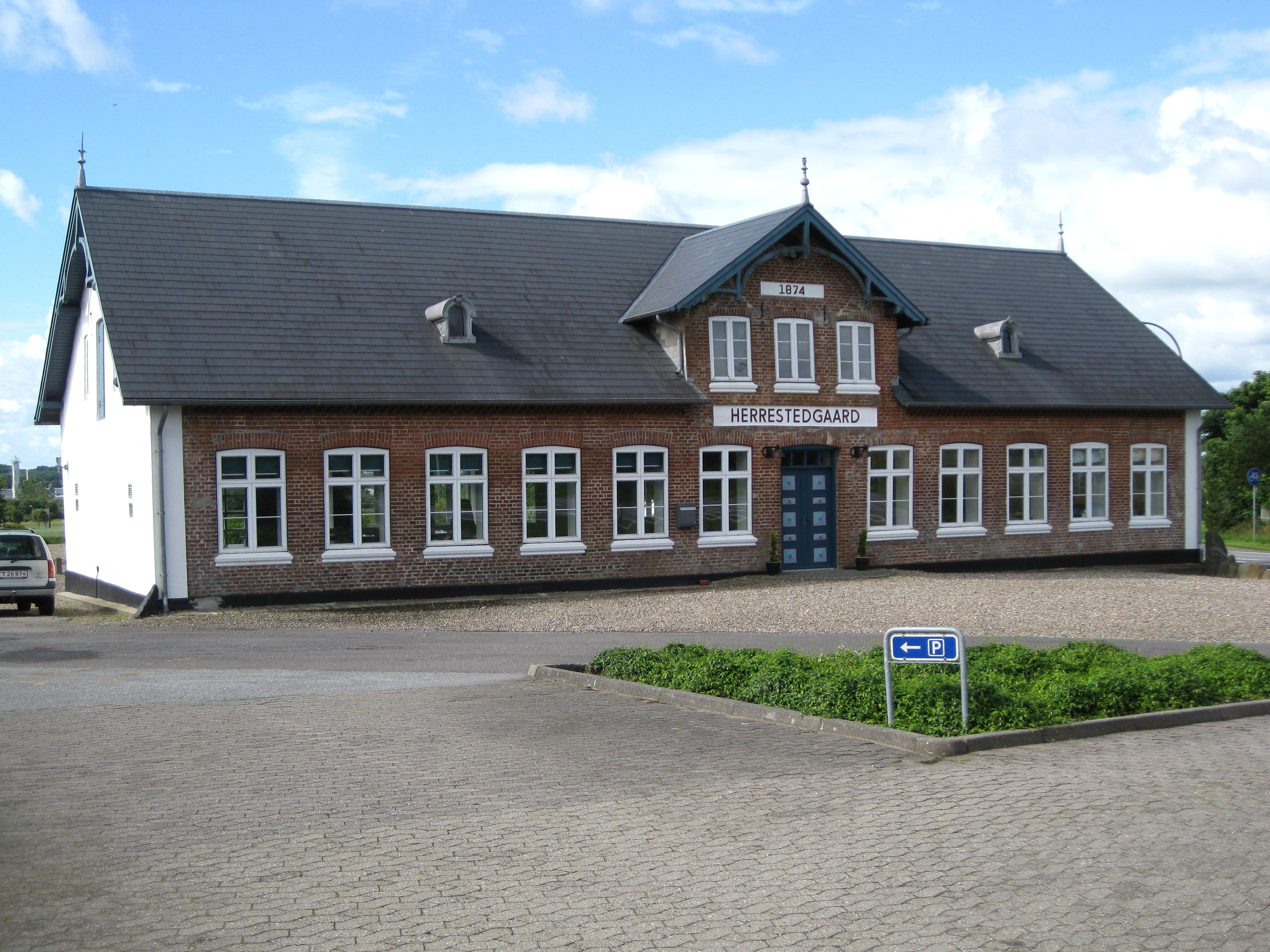
Toftlund - Herrestedgaard

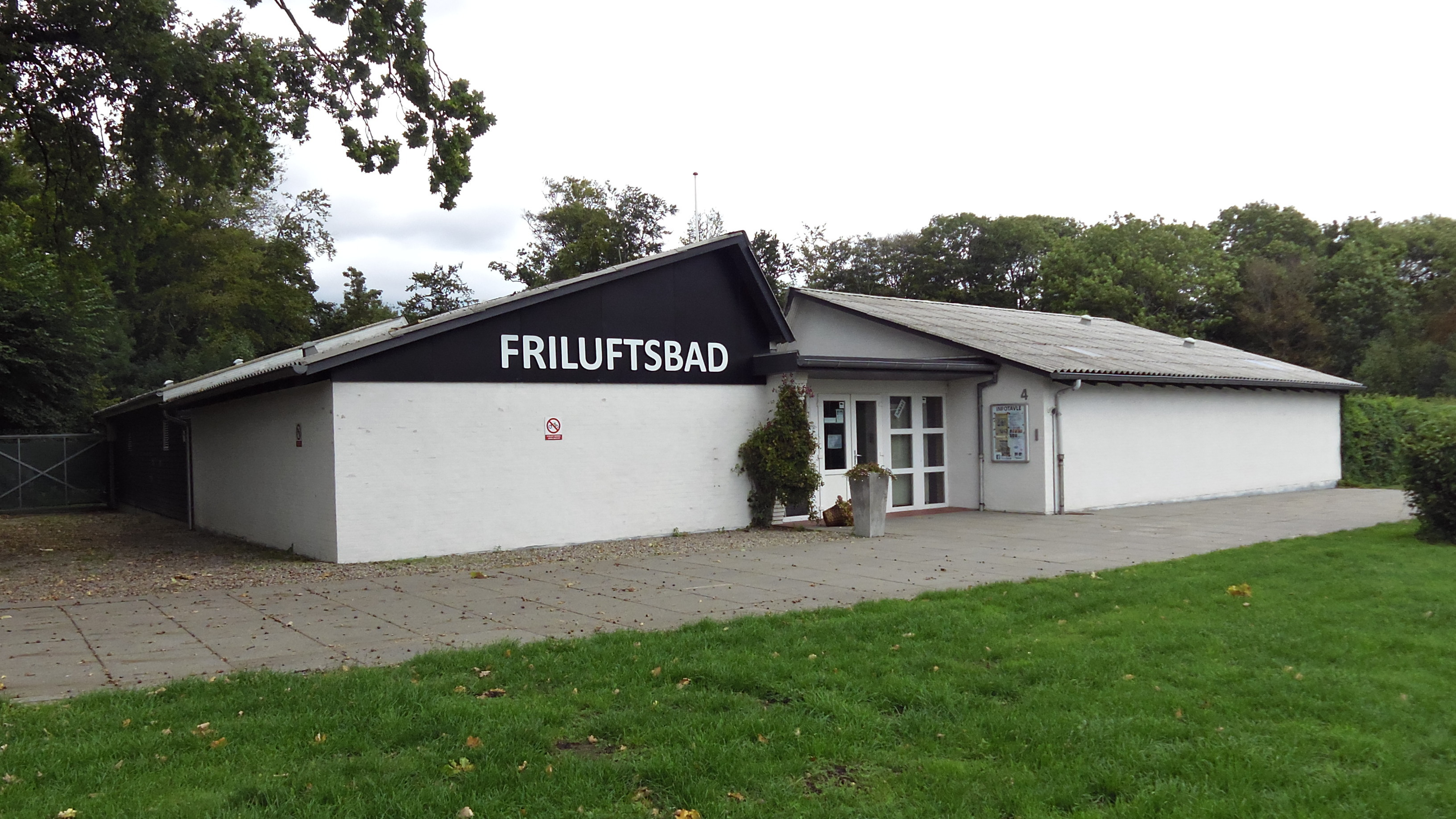
Outdoor Pool

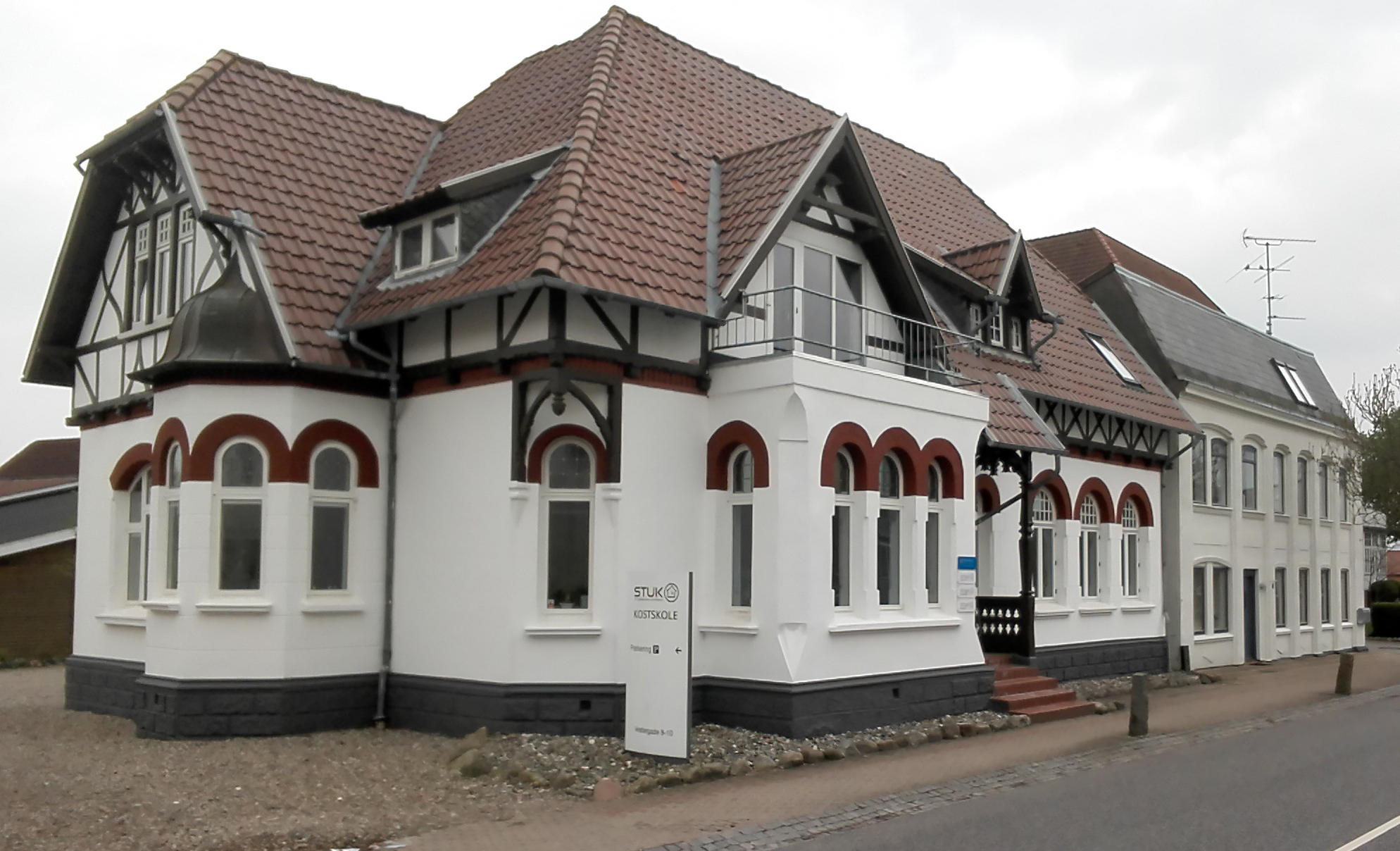
STUK (private school)

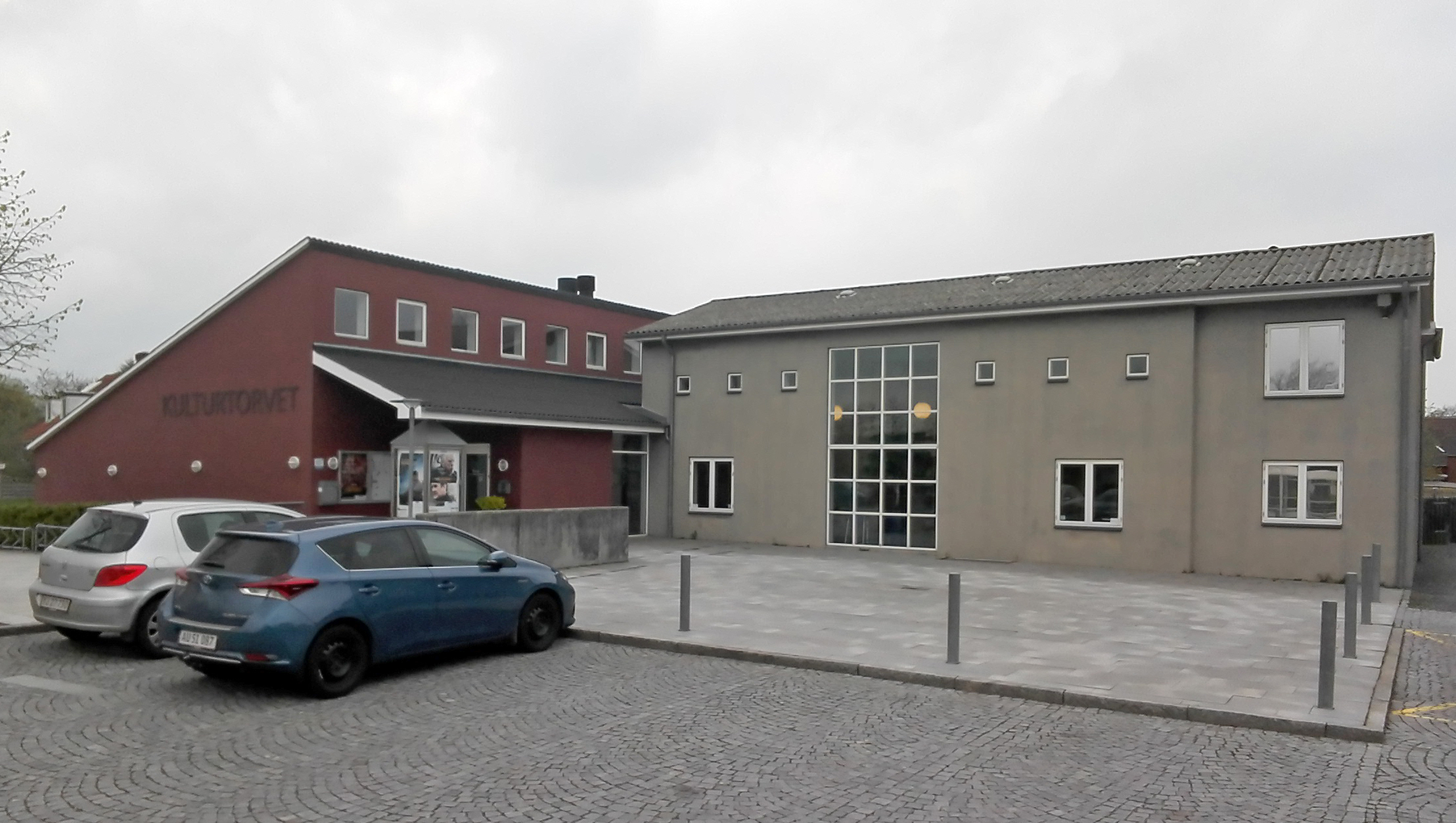
Culture Square (library + movie theater)

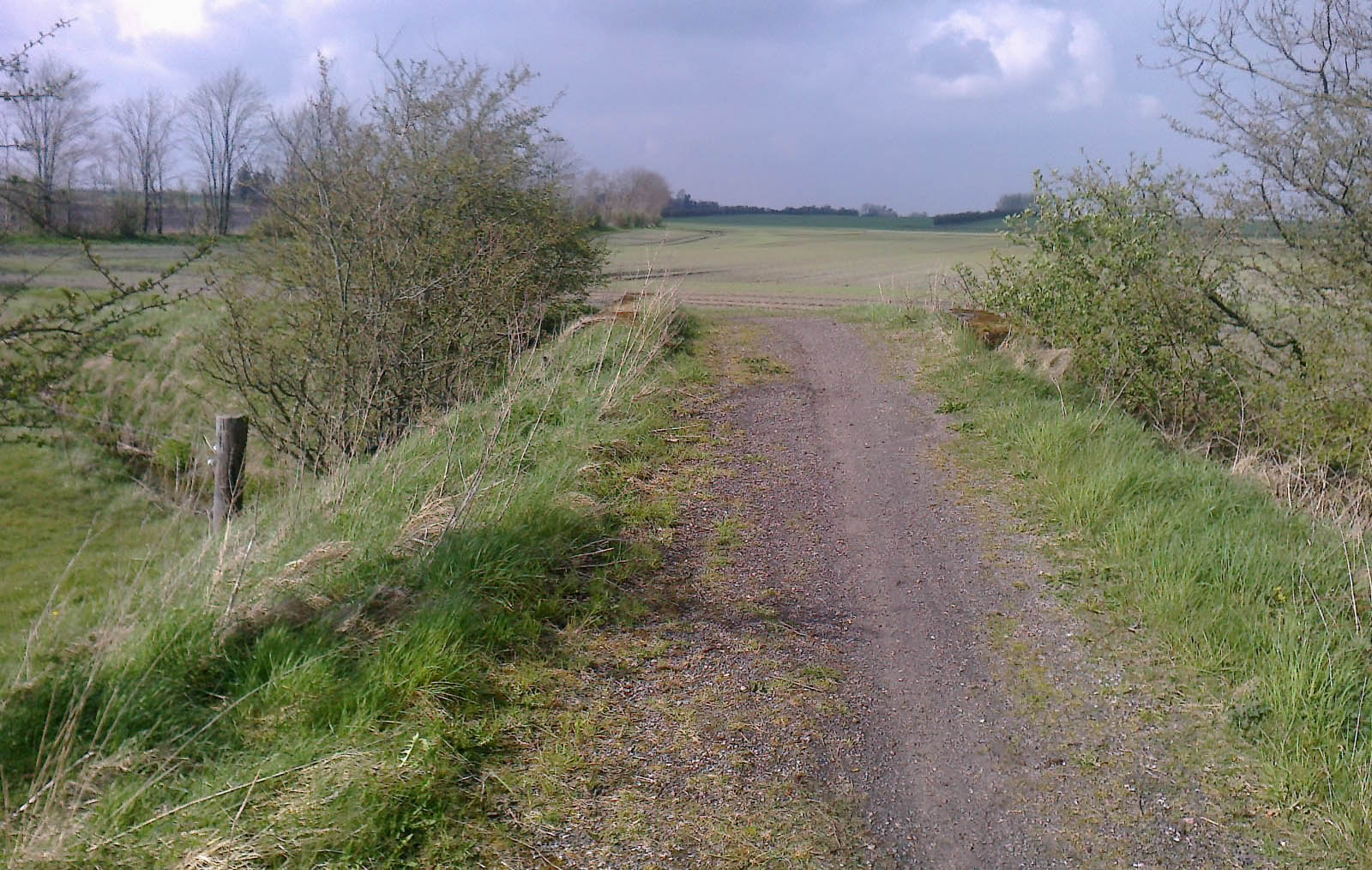
Trail North of Toftlund Forest

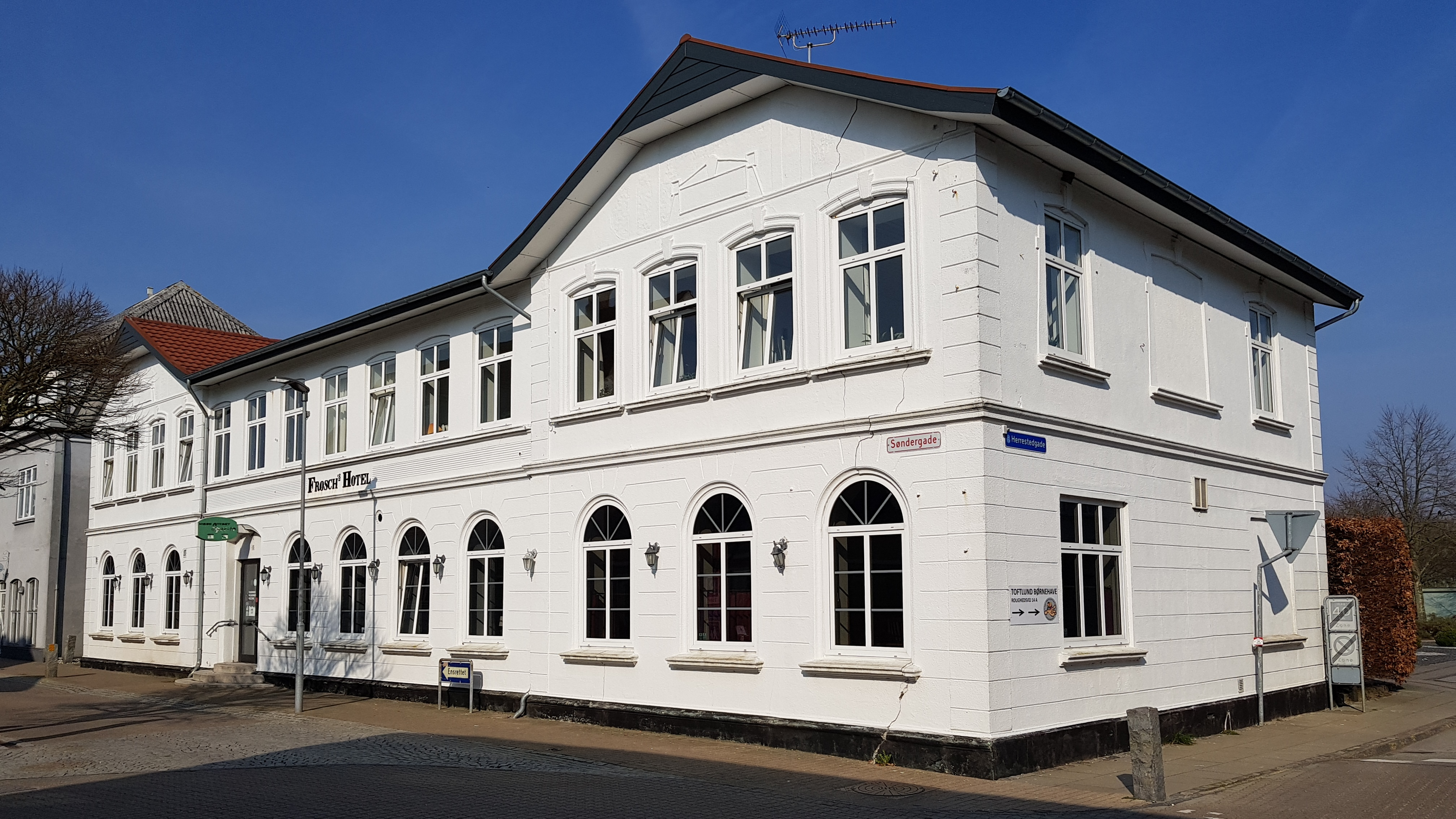
Frosch's Hotel

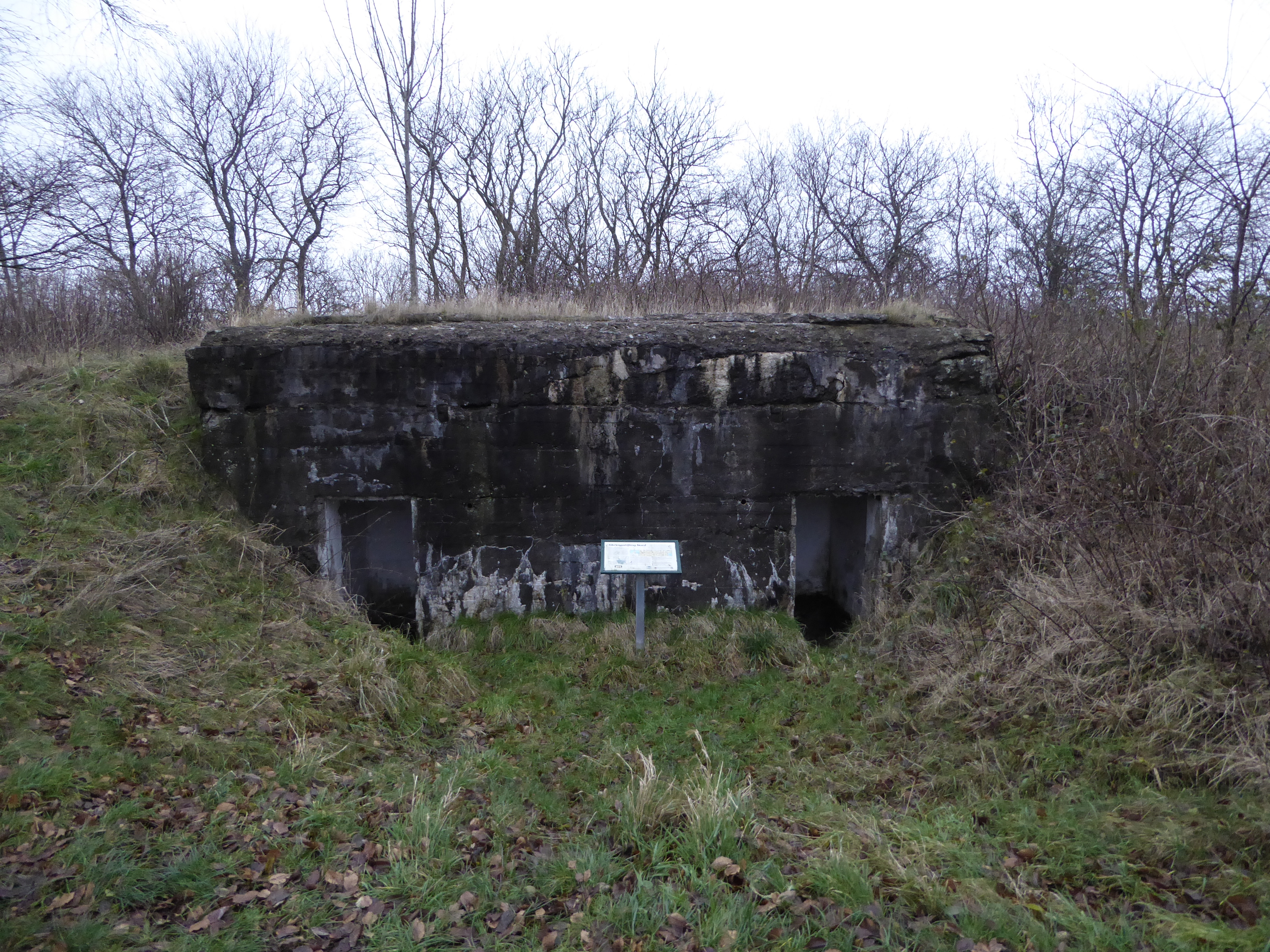
German bunker from World War I
