= Susanne Ussing =

Danish artist, architect, and ceramicist

Susanne Ussing (November 29, 1940, Frederiksberg – March 8, 1998, Gentofte) was a Danish artist, architect and ceramicist.

== Career ==
In 1960–63, she studied at the Royal Danish Academy's School of Architecture.

The feminine world fascinated her. A large portion of her works were created with organic materials. With her husband, Carsten Hoff, they created a design studio called Ussing and Hoff. in 1970, after her design studio was created, she began to practice her expertise in housing construction. Ussing entered the Danish Architects' Association competition from 1970–1973 using award-winning ideas for multi-story homes. The fusing of art and living life was a continuous theme in Ussing's work. The Women's Exhibition in 1975 and the Children's Exhibitions, shown across her country, from 1978-1979 showed this theme.

Ussing and Hoff's workshop caught fire in 1984. Ussing did not allow this to stop her as she still presented her burnt pieces at the North Jutland Art Museum, in 1987. In 1988 she won the Nykredit Architecture Prize and in 1989 she received the Eckersberg Medal. In her remaining years Ussing participated in decorating tasks and presented her ceramic works in a number of exhibitions.

== Artworks ==
- "In the Greenhouse" (Denmark, 1980).
- "Seaweed Church" (Louisiana Museum of Modern Art, Denmark, 1980–84).

=== Exhibitions ===
- Women's exhibition (Charlottenborg, Copenhagen, 1975).
- Children's Exhibition (Louisiana Museum of Modern Art, Denmark, 1978).
- Retrospective exhibition "Susanne Ussing – works 1957-87" (Nordjyllands Kunstmuseum, Denmark, 1987).
- Retrospective exhibition "Susanne Ussing" (Den Fri Udstillingsbygning, Denmark 2014).
- Children Exhibition Susanne Ussing's Children Exhibition(Denmark, 1978)

== See also ==
- Cyberspace
