= Brøns =

Village in Tønder Muncipality, Southern Denmark

- Town
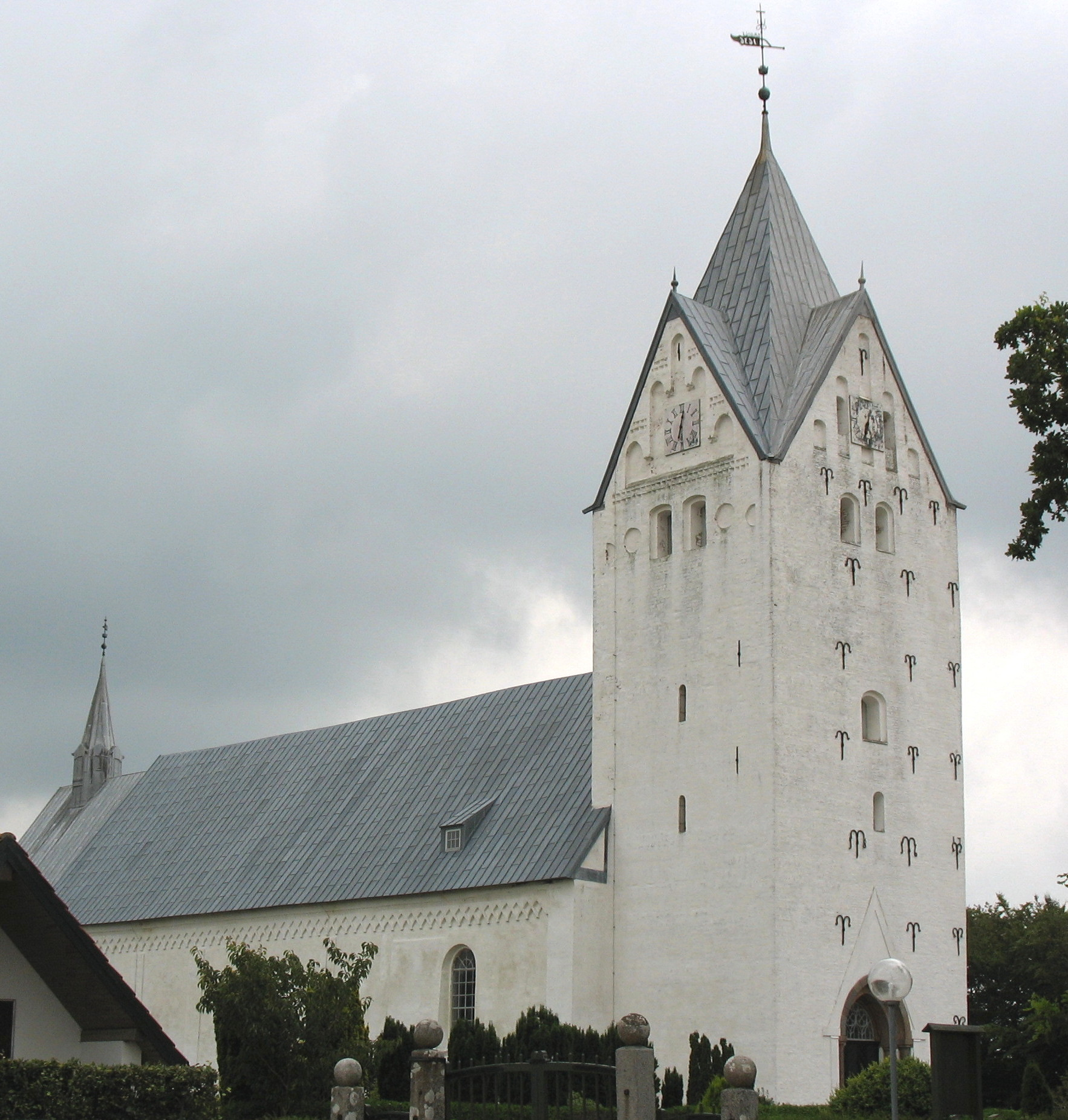
- Brøns Church

- Location in Denmark Brøns (Region of Southern Denmark)
- Coordinates: 55°11′42″N 8°43′37″E
- Country: Denmark
- Region: Southern Denmark
- Municipality: Tønder Municipality

Population (2026)
  - Urban: 357
- Time zone: UTC+1 (CET)
  - Summer (DST): UTC+2 (CEST)
- Postal code: DK-6780 Skærbæk

Brøns is a village in Tønder Municipality in Region of Southern Denmark, Denmark. As of 1 January 2026 it has a population of 357. It is located close to the Wadden Sea, 5 km north of Skærbæk, 16 km south of Ribe and 31 km north of Tønder.

Brøns Church is located in the village which is served by Brøns railway station, located on the Bramming–Tønder railway line.
