= Henrik Frandsen =

Danish politician

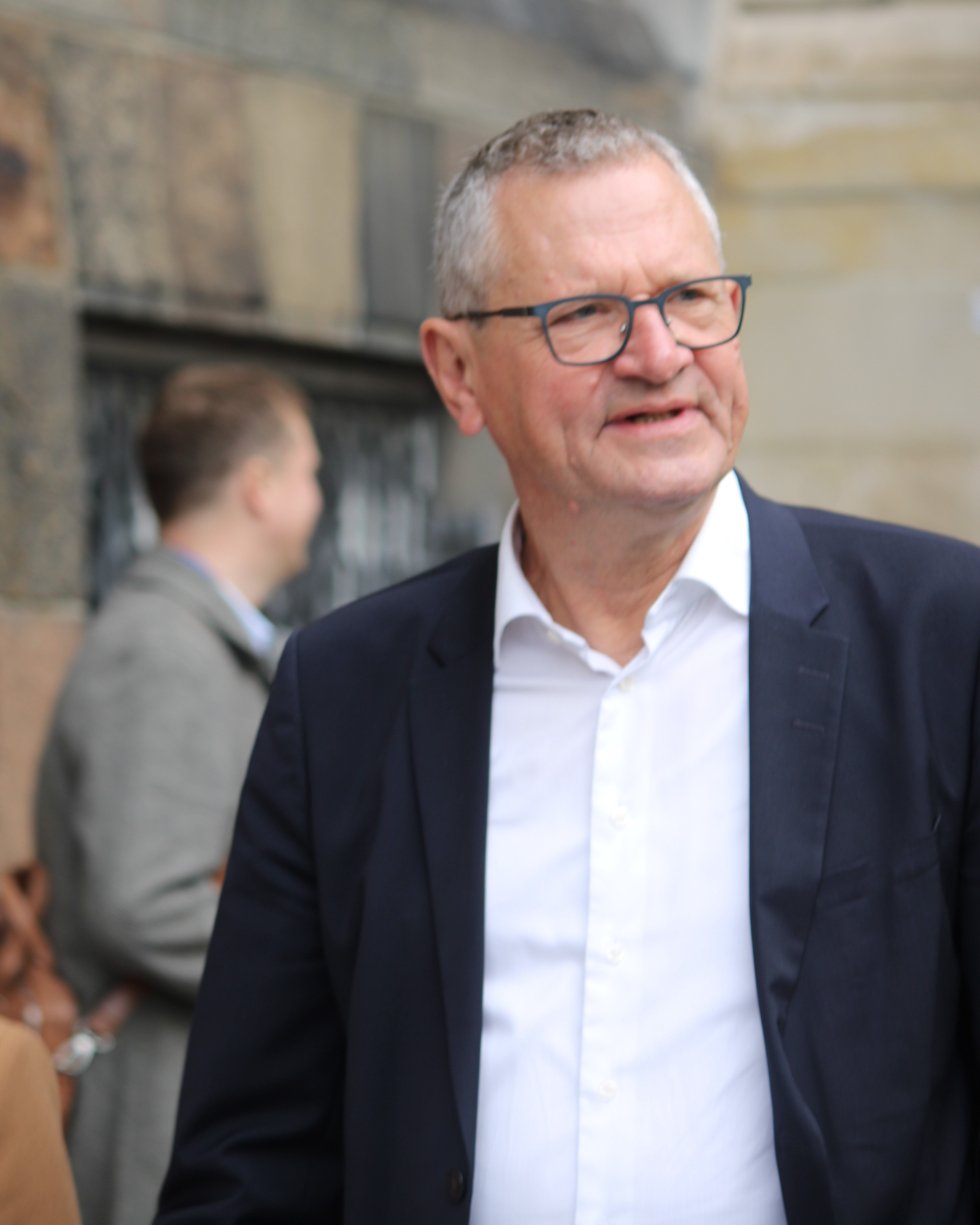
- Frandsen in 2025

Speaker of the Folketing
- Incumbent
- Assumed office 6 October 2026

Member of the Folketing
- Incumbent
- Assumed office 1 November 2022
- Constituency: South Jutland

Mayor of Tønder Municipality
- In office 26 May 2016 – 16 November 2021

Personal details
- Born: February 8, 1961 (age 65)
- Party: Moderates (2022–)
- Other political affiliations: Tønder Listen (2020–2022); Venstre (before 2020)
- Children: 3

Henrik Frandsen (born 8 February 1961) is a Danish politician serving as the Speaker of the Folketing since 2026 and Member of the Folketing for the Moderates since the 2022 election. He was formerly mayor of Tønder Municipality. He is Minister for the elderly as of 3 February 2026 in the government Frederiksen II Cabinet.

== Career ==
Frandsen stood as a candidate for the agrarian liberal Venstre in Tønder Municipality in the 2013 Danish local elections, but lost to incumbent fellow Venstre member Laurids Rudebeck. Laurids died in 2016, allowing Frandsen to take over the position as mayor. Following the 2017 Danish local elections, Frandsen was able to continue as mayor after a gain of one seat in the municipal council.

In 2020 Frandsen founded his own local party, Tønder Listen, after Venstre announced that their new candidate for the mayor position was Martin Iversen. At the 2021 Danish local elections, Tønder Listen was the party with the most votes in Tønder Municipality, gaining 27% of the vote, but not enough to ensure Frandsen could continue as mayor. Jørgen Popp Petersen replaced Frandsen as mayor.

In August 2022 Frandsen announced he would be joining the newly-founded party Moderaterne led by former Venstre leader Lars Løkke Rasmussen. He subsequently won a seat in the Folketing in the 2022 Danish general election receiving 6,206 personal votes.

== Personal life ==
Frandsen is married and has three children. Before entering politics, he worked as a swine farmer. He sold his farm in 2018.
