= Døstrup =

- Village
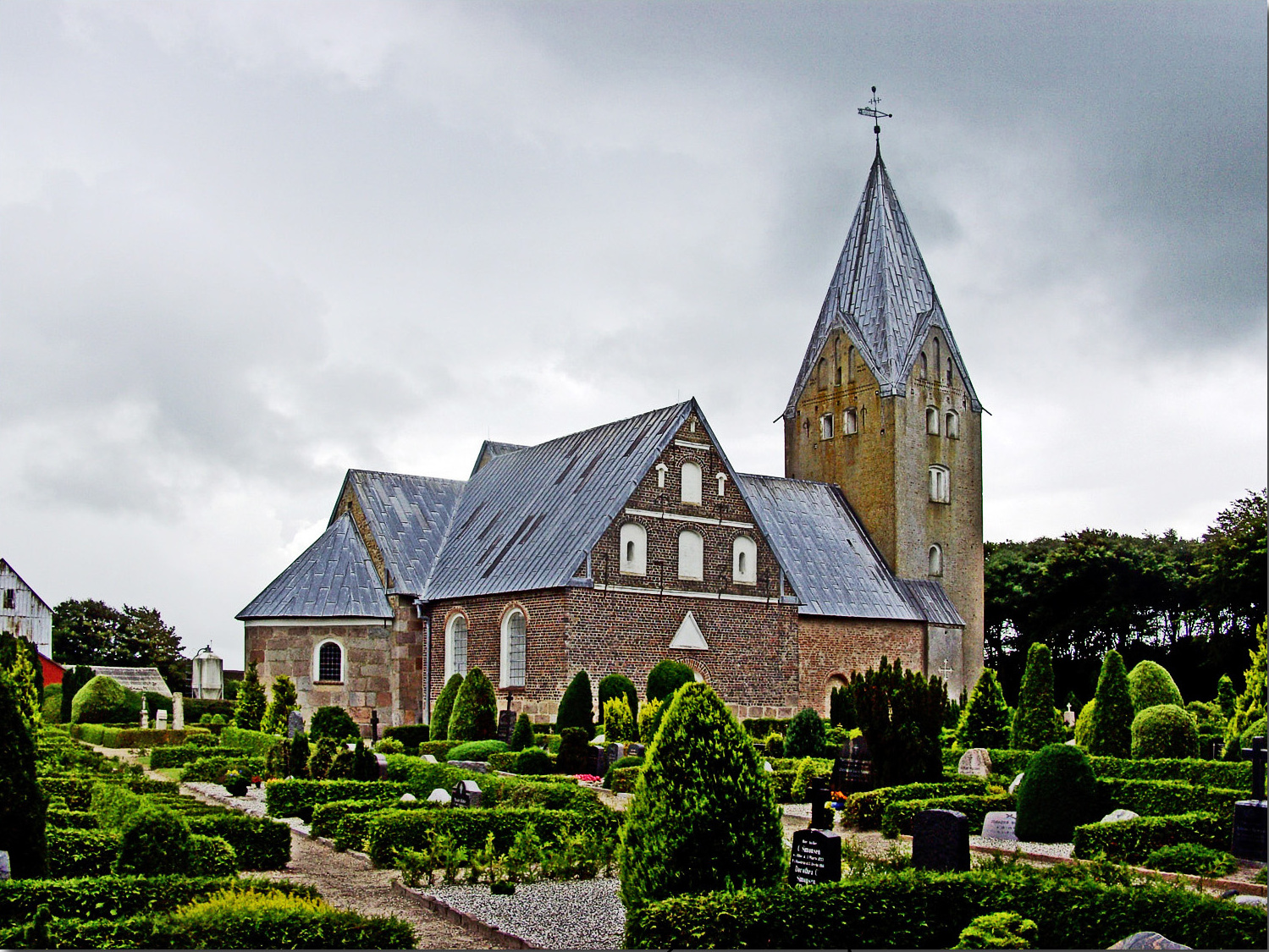
- Døstrup Church

- Location within Region of Southern Denmark Location within Denmark
- Coordinates: 55°7′2″N 8°48′24″E
- Country: Denmark
- Region: Southern Denmark
- Municipality: Tønder Municipality

Population (2026)
  - Total: 292

Døstrup is a village with a population of 292 (1 January 2026) in Southern Jutland in Denmark. Døstrup is located six kilometers south of Skærbæk, seven kilometers north of Bredebro and 22 kilometers north of Tønder.
