= Gredstedbro =

- Town
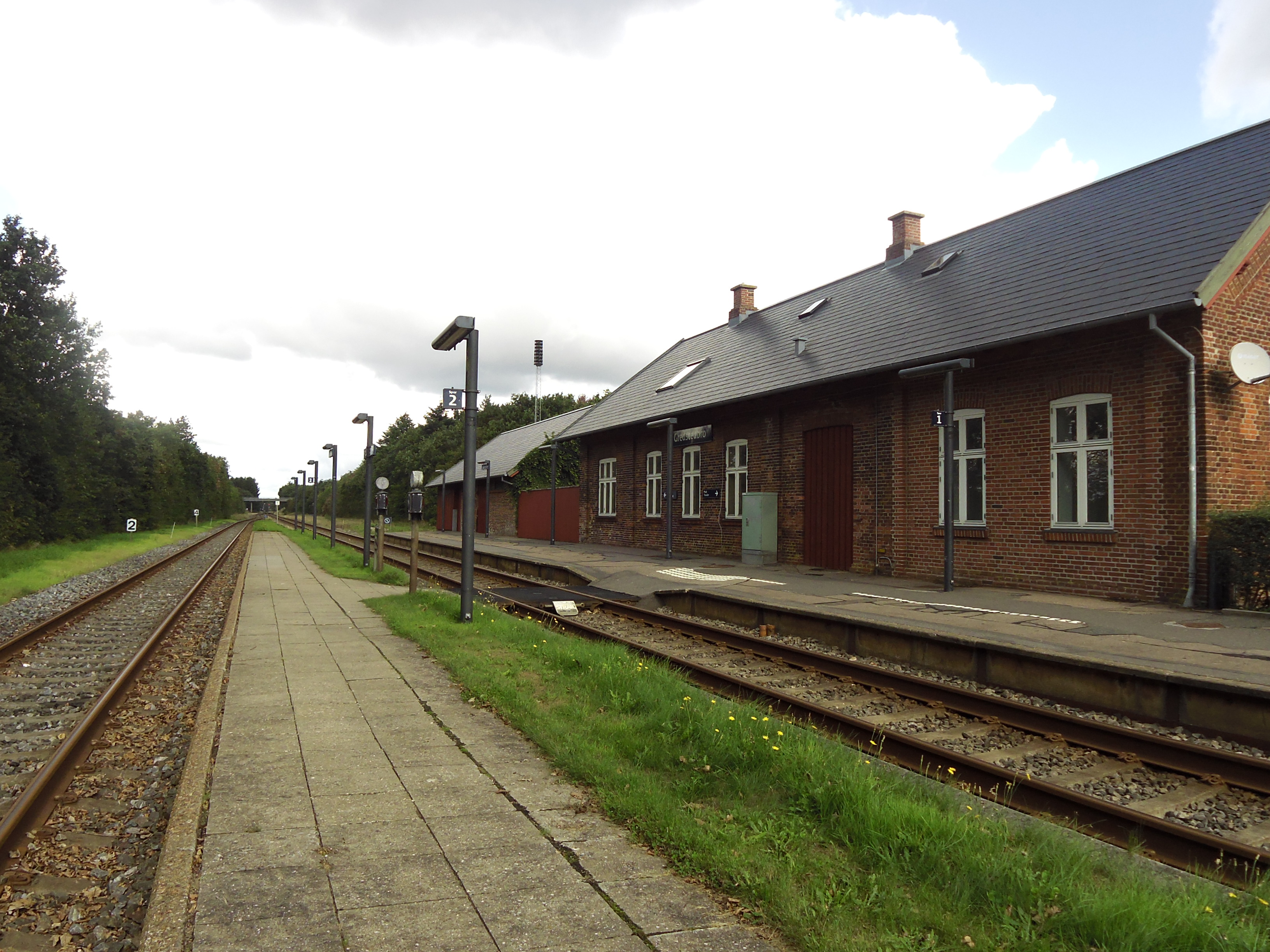
- Gredstedbro railway station

- Location in Denmark Gredstedbro (Region of Southern Denmark)
- Coordinates: 55°23′50″N 8°44′40″E
- Country: Denmark
- Region: Southern Denmark
- Municipality: Esbjerg Municipality
- Parish: Jernved Parish

Area
  - Urban: 0.8 km^{2} (0.31 sq mi)

Population (2026)
  - Urban: 1,047
  - Urban density: 1,300/km^{2} (3,400/sq mi)
- Time zone: UTC+1 (CET)
  - Summer (DST): UTC+2 (CEST)
- Postal code: DK-6771 Gredstedbro

Gredstedbro is a railway town, with a population of 1,047 (1 January 2026), in Esbjerg Municipality, Region of Southern Denmark in Denmark. It is located 9 km north of Ribe, 10 km south of Bramming and 20 km southeast of Esbjerg, just north of the Kongeå and just east of the Danish national road 11.

Gredstedbro is served by Gredstedbro railway station on the Bramming–Tønder railway line.

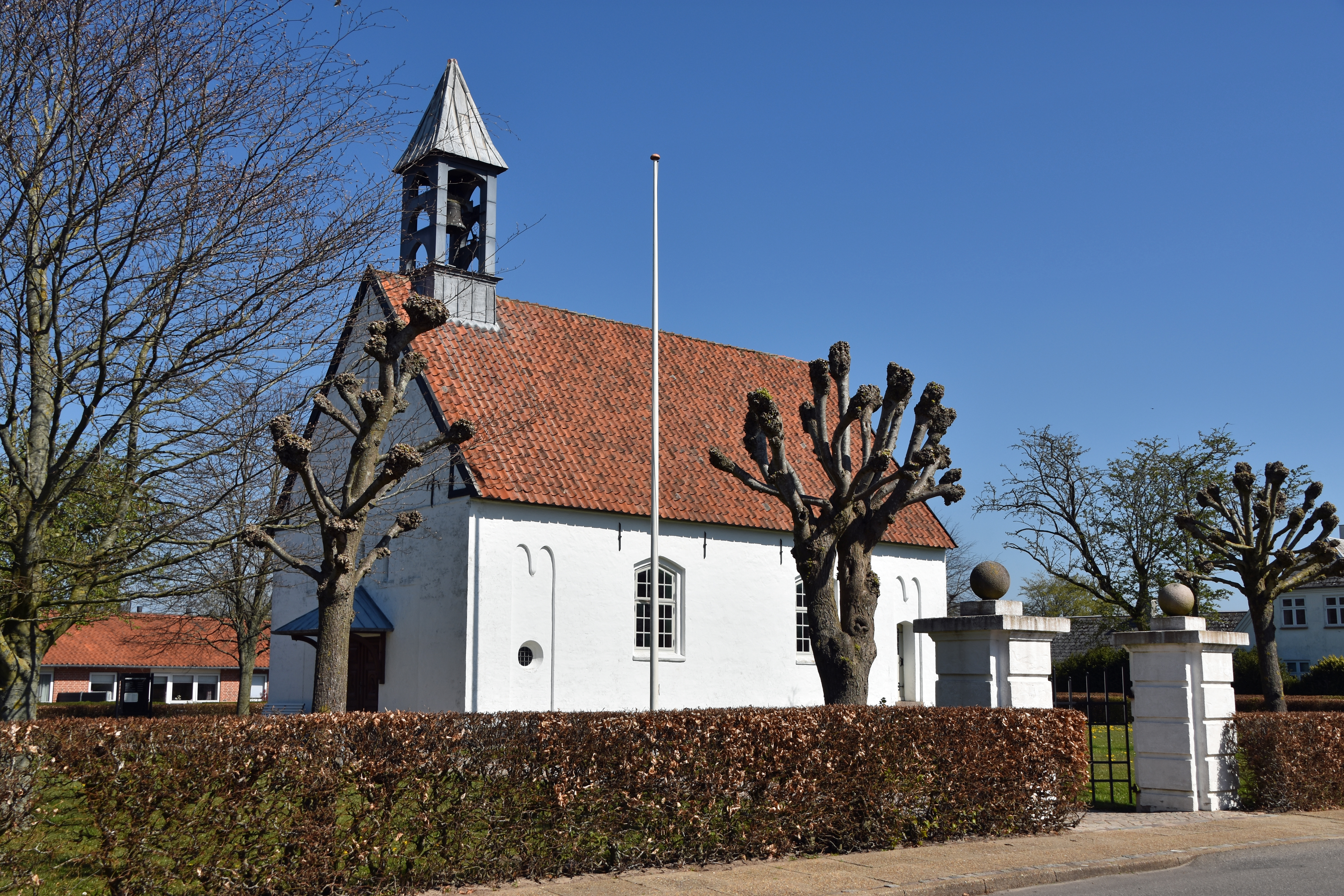
Gredstedbro Church

Gredstedbro Church was inaugurated in 1925 as an affiliated church in Jernved Parish. The parish church, Jernved Church, is located in the village of Jernved 3 km northeast of Gredstedbro.

When the river Kongeå was straightened out by Gredstedbro in 1945, the digger came across three pieces of hard oak. At the time it was believed that it was the remains of an old bridge, but almost twenty years later it was discovered that it was the remains of a ship from the Iron Age, the so-called Gredstedbro ship (Danish: Gredstedbroskibet).
