= Listed buildings in Esbjerg Municipality =

This is a list of listed buildings in Esbjerg Municipality, Denmark.

Note:: This list is incomplete. A complete list of listed buildings in Esbjerg Municipality can be found on Danish Wikipedia.

== The list ==
=== 6700 Esbjerg ===
Listing name	Image	Location	Coordinates	Description
Esbjerg Ikd Town Hall		Danmarksgade 38, 6700 Esbjerg		
Esbjerg Ikd Town Hall		Skolegade 33, 6700 Esbjerg		
Esbjerg Posthus		Torvet 20, 6700 Esbjerg		
Esbjerg Station		Jernbanegade 31, 6700 Esbjerg		
Esbjerg Vandtårn		Havnegade 22, 6700 Esbjerg		
Missionshuset		Kirkegade 25, 6700 Esbjerg		
Nygårdsvej 65		Nygårdsvej 65, 6700 Esbjerg		
Toldkammerbygningen		Toldbodvej 1, 6700 Esbjerg		
Torvet 18		Torvet 18, 6700 Esbjerg		
Torvet 19		Torvet 19, 6700 Esbjerg		
Østergade 4		Østergade 4, 6700 Esbjerg		

=== 6710 Esbjerg ===
Listing name	Image	Location	Coordinates	Description
Guldager Station		Guldager Stationsvej 101, 6710 Esbjerg V		
Guldager Station		Guldager Stationsvej 101, 6710 Esbjerg V		
Guldager Station	Sædding Strand Mellemfyr		Fyrparken 9, 6710 Esbjerg V	

=== 6740 Bramming ===
Listing name	Image	Location	Coordinates	Description
Bramming Hovedgård		Kirkebrovej 7, 6740 Bramming		
Bramming Hovedgård		Kirkebrovej 7, 6740 Bramming		
Bramming Hovedgård		Kirkebrovej 7, 6740 Bramming		
Darum Præstegård		Feilbergvej 15, 6740 Bramming		
Endrupholm Hovedgård		Klostergade 4, 6760 Ribe		
Endrupholm Hovedgård		Klostergade 4, 6760 Ribe		
Endrupholm Hovedgård		Klostergade 4, 6760 Ribe		

=== 6760 Ribe ===
This list is incomplete

Listing name	Image	Location	Coordinates	Description
Aldershvile		Skibbroen 29, 6760 Ribe		
Aldershvile		Skibbroen 29, 6760 Ribe		
Almisseboderne		Klostergade 4, 6760 Ribe		
Almisseboderne		Klostergade 6, 6760 Ribe		
Almisseboderne		Klostergade 8, 6760 Ribe		
Apoteket, Ribe		Fiskergade 1A, 6760 Ribe		
Apoteket, Ribe		Fiskergade 1G, 6760 Ribe		
Apoteket, Ribe		Overdammen 5A, 6760 Ribe		
Arresthuset		Torvet 11, 6760 Ribe		
Bispegade 13		Bispegade 13, 6760 Ribe		l
Bispegade 15		Bispegade 15, 6760 Ribe		l
Bispegade 17		Bispegade 17, 6760 Ribe		l
Bispegade 19		Bispegade 19, 6760 Ribe		l
Bispegade 21		Bispegade 21, 6760 Ribe		l
Bispegade 23		Bispegade 23, 6760 Ribe		l
Bredeslippe 8		Bredeslippe 8, 6760 Ribe		l
Bredeslippe 9-11		Bredeslippe 9, 6760 Ribe		l
Den gamle Domskole, Ribe		Skolegade 1A, 6760 Ribe		
Den gamle Domskole, Ribe		Skolegade 1B, 6760 Ribe		
Farup Missionshus		Farup Kirkevej 50, 6760 Ribe		l
Farup Rectory		Farup Kirkevej 6, 6760 Ribe		
Farup Rectory		Farup Kirkevej 6, 6760 Ribe		
Faruplund		Sdr Farup Vej 46, 6760 Ribe		l
Fiskergade 1		Overdammen 7, 6760 Ribe		l

== Delisted buildings ==
This list is incomplete

Listing name	Image	Location	Coordinates	Description
Bredeslippe 2		Bredeslippe 2, 6760 Ribe		l
Bredeslippe 7		Bredeslippe 7, 6760 Ribe		l
