= Omega bridge =

Omega bridge Omegabrücke
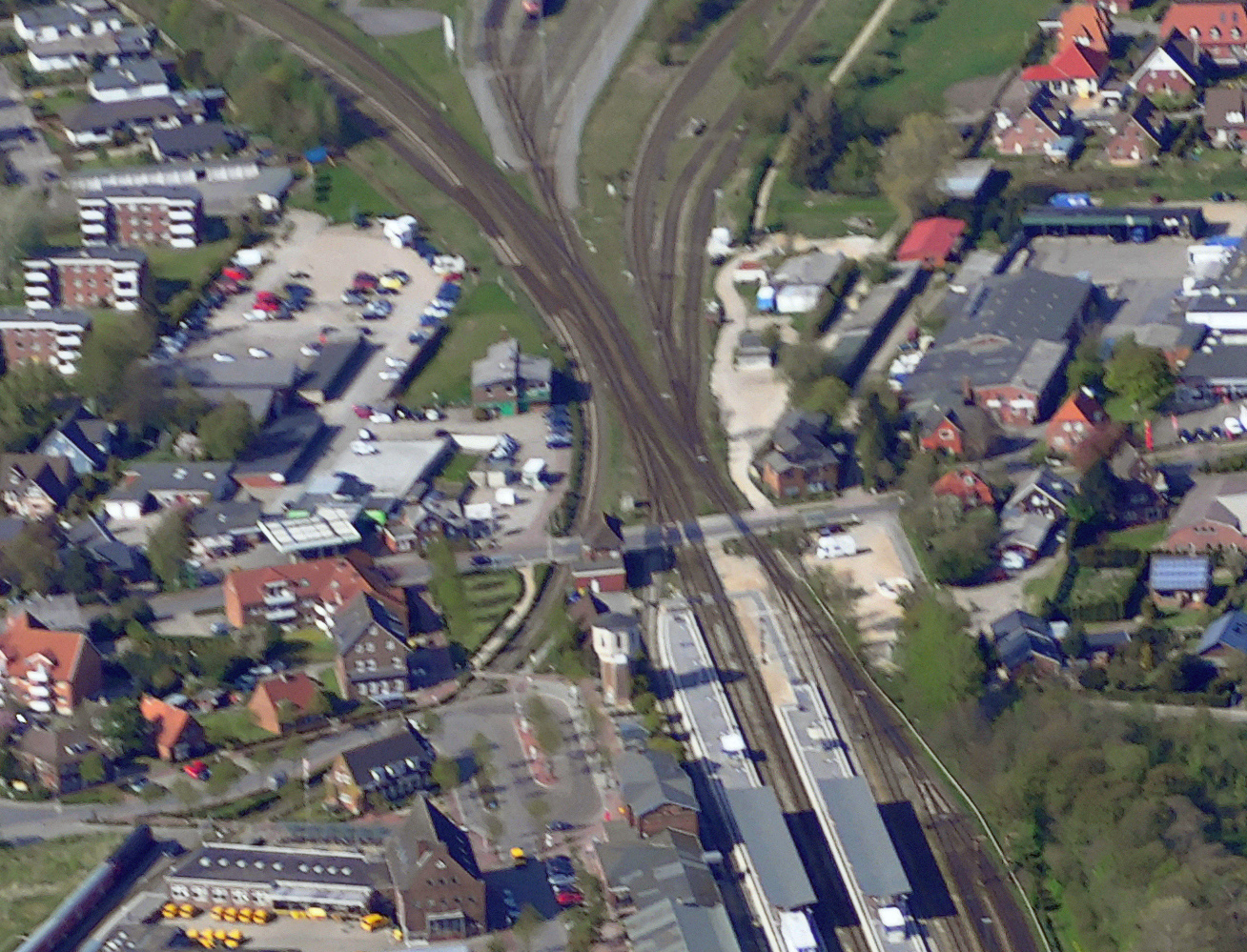
- Future bridge location, showing level crossing north of Niebüll station (2012)
- Coordinates: 54.792°N 8.835°E
- Carries: Gather Landstraße
- Crosses: Marsh Railway; Niebüll–Dagebüll railway (NEG) connecting track; Bramming–Tønder railway line (NEG)
- Locale: Niebull

Characteristics
- No. of lanes: 2

History
- Construction start: late-2020s
- Replaces: Level crossing #140, "Gather Landstraße", railway kilometre 198,628

Location
- Interactive map of Omega bridge

The Omega bridge (Omega-Brücke) is a planned road bridge in Niebull, Germany, under construction during in the late-2020s. This new bridge at Niebüll station will supersede the heavily used level crossing across the Marsh Railway, the Niebüll–Dagebüll railway (NEG), and the tracks leading towards the Bramming–Tønder railway line.

An underpass for pedestrians and cyclists will be constructed.

The tracks under the bridge will be electrified, and part of the Marsh Railway will be expanded to double track under the new bridge. Construction work will be coordinated between the bridge works and the railway expansion.
