= Bramming railway station =

Railway station in West Jutland, Denmark

Bramming
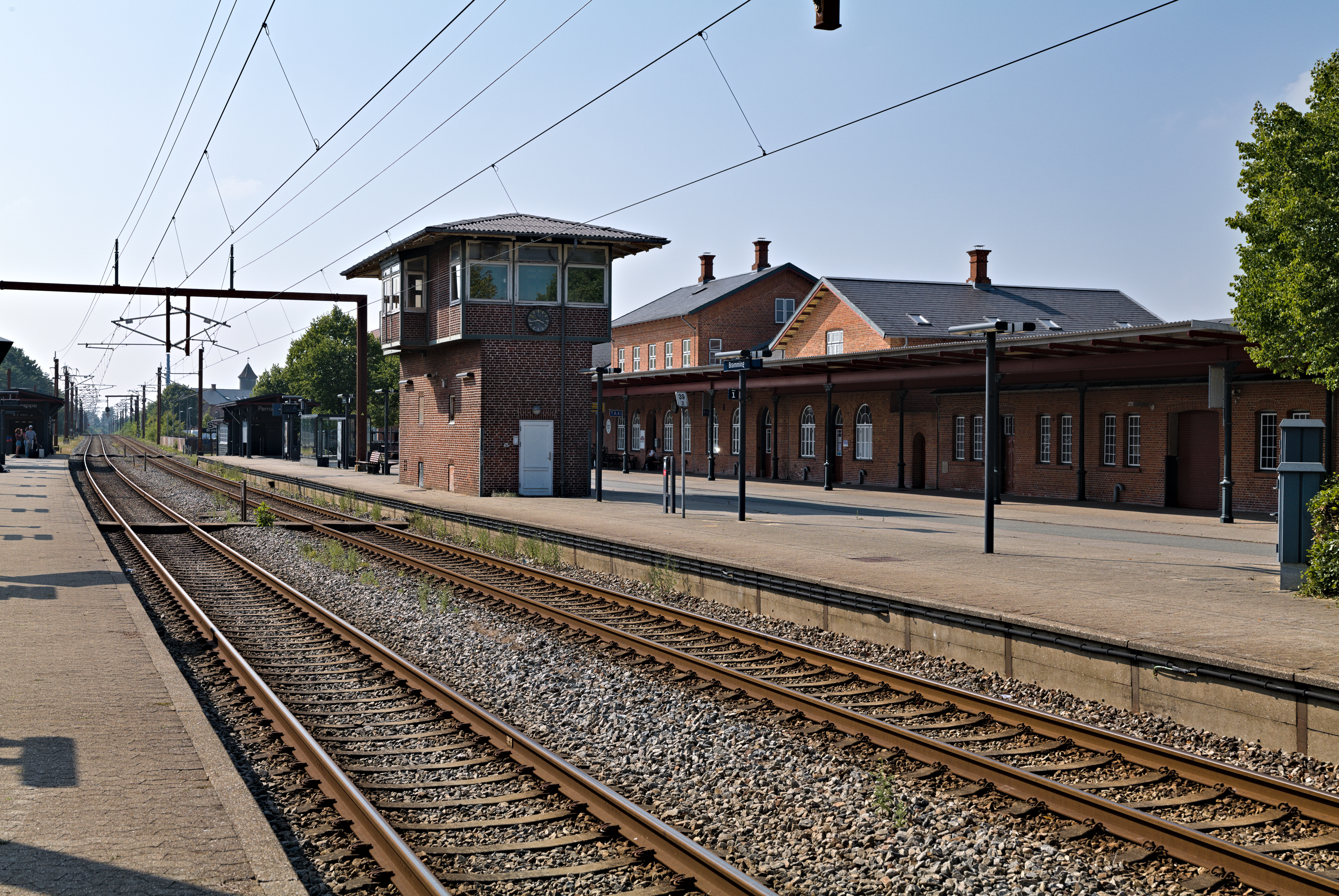
- Bramming station in 2022

General information
- Location: Jernbanegade 9; 6740 Bramming; Esbjerg Municipality; Denmark
- Coordinates: 55°27′52.73″N 8°42′25.69″E
- Elevation: 12.1 metres (40 ft)
- Owner: DSB (station infrastructure); Banedanmark (rail infrastructure)
- Lines: Lunderskov–Esbjerg; Bramming–Tønder; Langå–Bramming (closed 2012)
- Platforms: 2
- Tracks: 3
- Train operators: DSB; GoCollective

Construction
- Architect: Niels Peder Christian Holsøe

Other information
- Station code: Bm
- Website: Official website

History
- Opened: 3 October 1874
- Former names: Bramminge

Services
Preceding station	DSB	Following station
Vejen towards Østerport	Copenhagen–Esbjerg InterCity	Esbjerg Terminus
Gørding towards Aalborg	Aalborg–Esbjerg InterCity	Esbjerg Terminus
Preceding station	GoCollective	Following station
Tjæreborg towards Esbjerg	Esbjerg–Niebüll Regional train	Sejstrup towards Niebüll
Location

Bramming railway station (previously: Bramminge) is a railway station serving the railway town of Bramming east of the city of Esbjerg in West Jutland, Denmark. The station is located in the centre of the town where the railway line crosses the old highway between Ribe and Varde.

Bramming railway station is located on the Lunderskov–Esbjerg railway line from Lunderskov to Esbjerg, and is also the northern terminal station of the Bramming–Tønder railway line. It offers InterCity services to Esbjerg and Copenhagen and regional rail services to Esbjerg, Fredericia and Aarhus operated by the national railway company DSB, as well as regional rail services to Esbjerg, Ribe, Tønder, and Niebüll in Germany, operated by the private public transport operating company GoCollective. The station opened in 1874. Its original and still existing station building from 1874 was built to designs by the Danish architect Niels Peder Christian Holsøe.

== History ==
Bramming railway station opened on 3 October 1874 as on one of the original intermediate stations on the Lunderskov–Esbjerg railway line. The station opened in open fields approximately 3 km south of the Bramming manor house and church, and was located where the railway line crossed the highway between Ribe and Varde. The only settlement nearby was the Kikkenborg Inn, situated c. 500 m (1,600 ft) to the west of the station, and the station was therefore initially called Kikkenborg. After the opening of the railway line, however, a railway town gradually developed around the station.

Already the following year, the station became a railway junction as the railway line from Bramming to Ribe was opened on 1 May 1875.

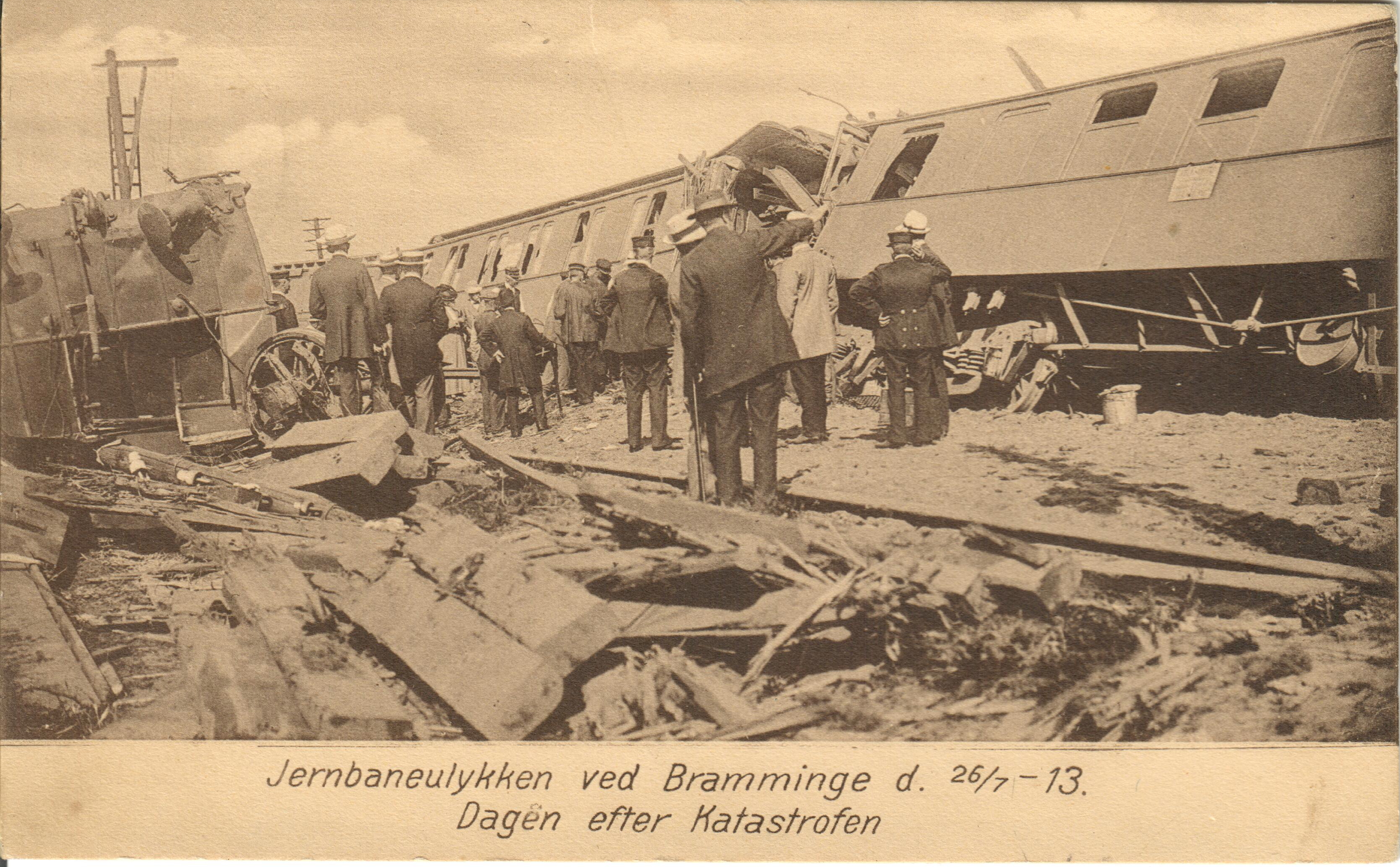
The 1913 Bramminge train accident.

The station was the site of the 1913 Bramminge train accident, when train 1029 (known as the Emigrant) servicing the route from Copenhagen to Esbjerg derailed soon after passing the station at Bramminge. The accident killed 15 people, injured 20 seriously, and caused minor injuries to 60-70 people.

In 1916, Bramming station also became the southwestern terminus of the railway line from Bramming to Grindsted which opened on 1 December 1916 and in 1920 became a part of the new Langå-Bramming railway line. The Langå-Bramming Line was closed in 1971. Freight traffic on the section to Grindsted continued until May 2012.

== Architecture ==
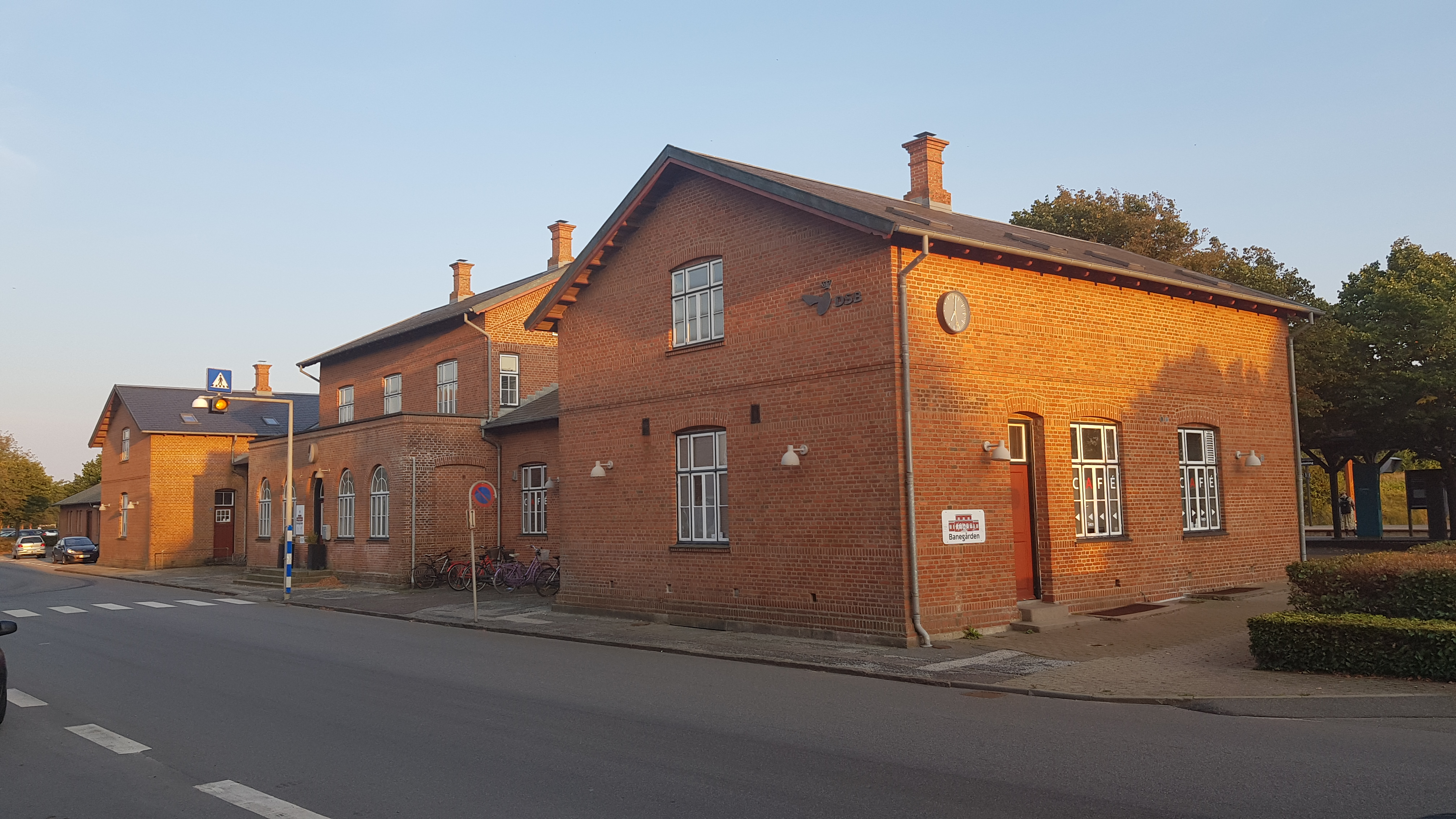
The station building in 2020.

The still existing station building from 1874 was built to designs by the Danish architect Niels Peder Christian Holsøe, known for the numerous railway stations he designed across Denmark in his capacity of head architect of the Danish State Railways.

== Services ==
The station offers direct InterCity services to Esbjerg and Copenhagen and regional rail services to Esbjerg, Fredericia and Aarhus, both operated by the national railway company DSB, as well as regional rail services to Esbjerg, Ribe, Tønder, and Niebüll in Germany, operated by the private public transport operating company GoCollective.

== Gallery ==
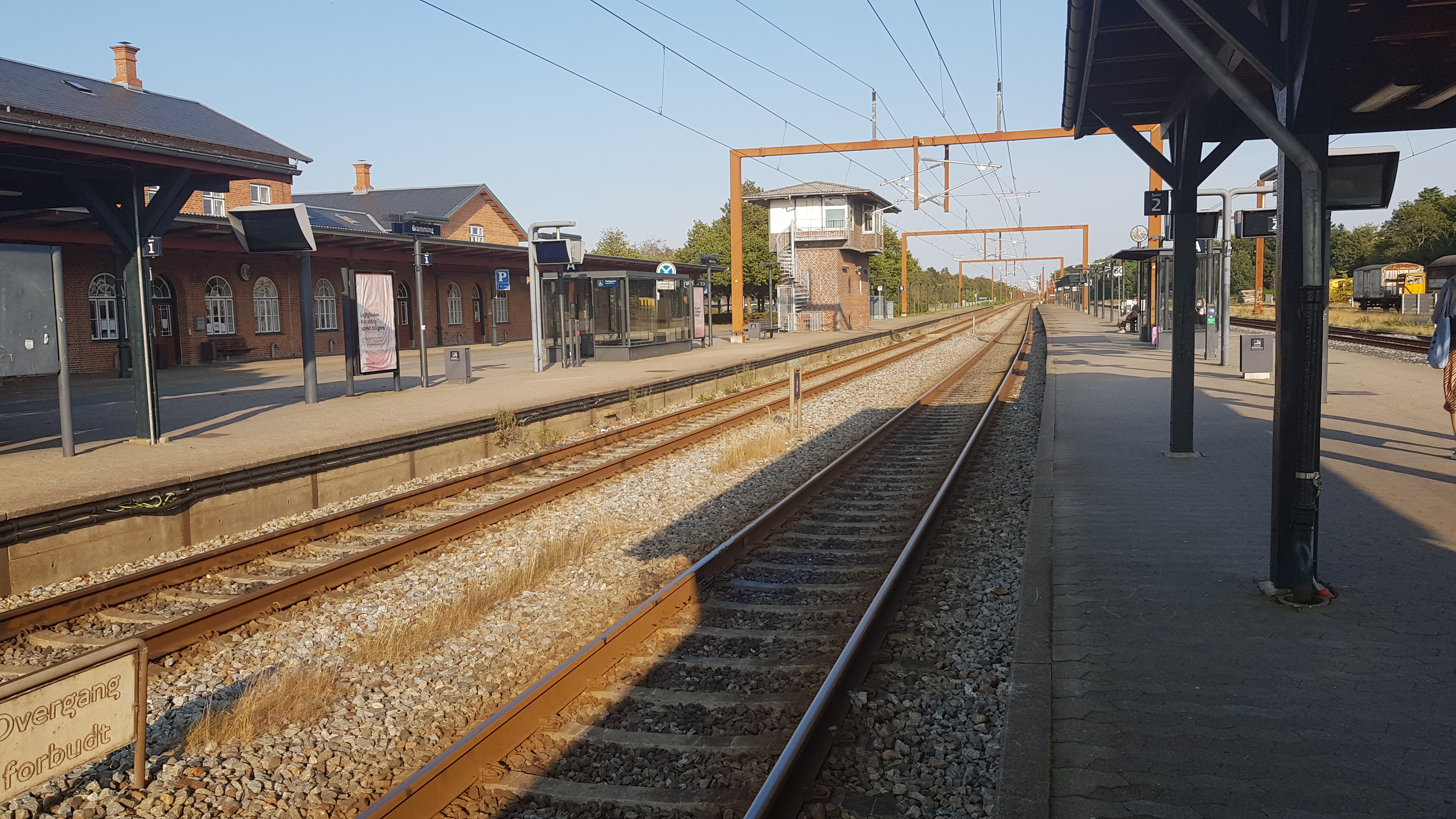

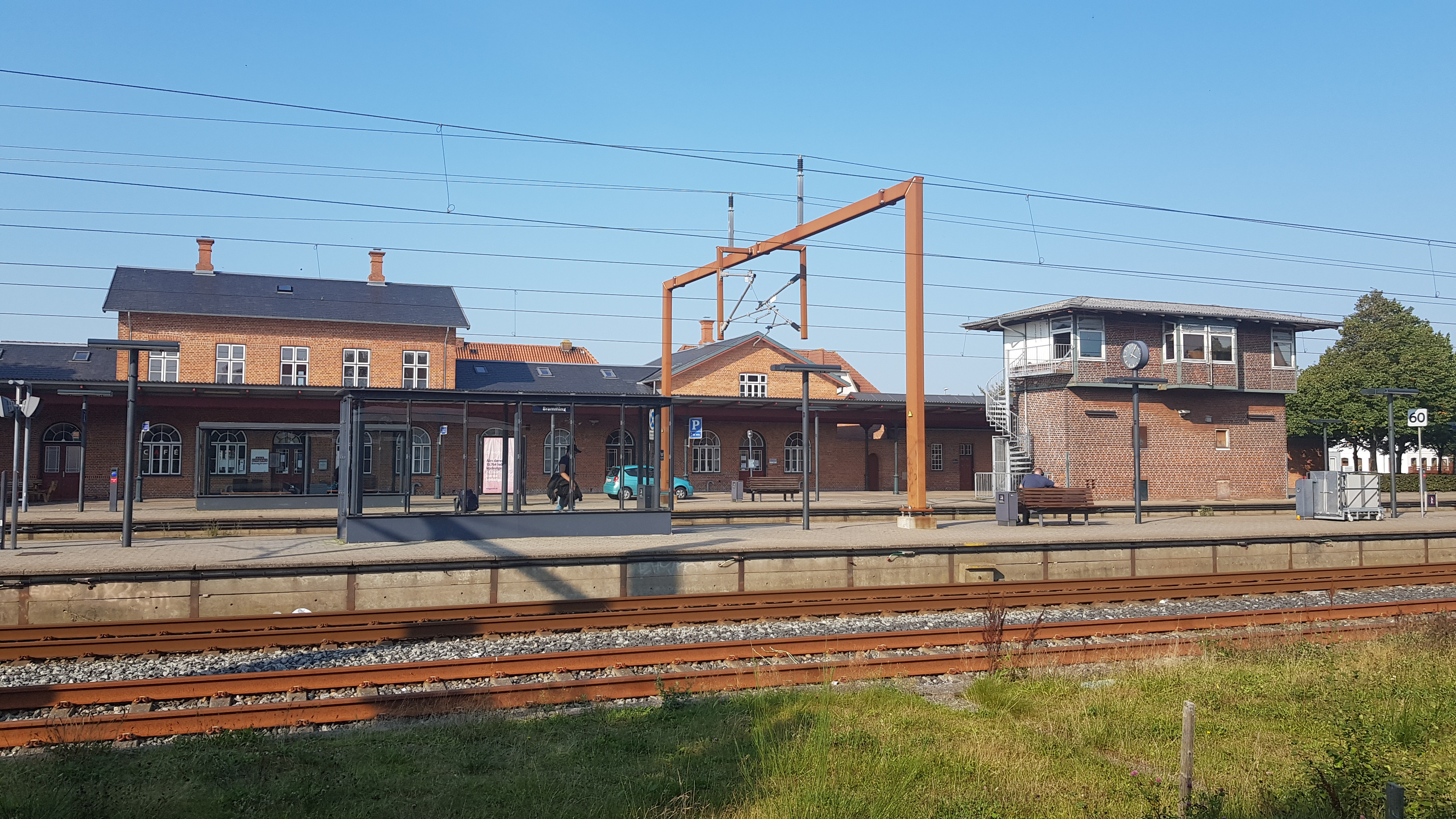

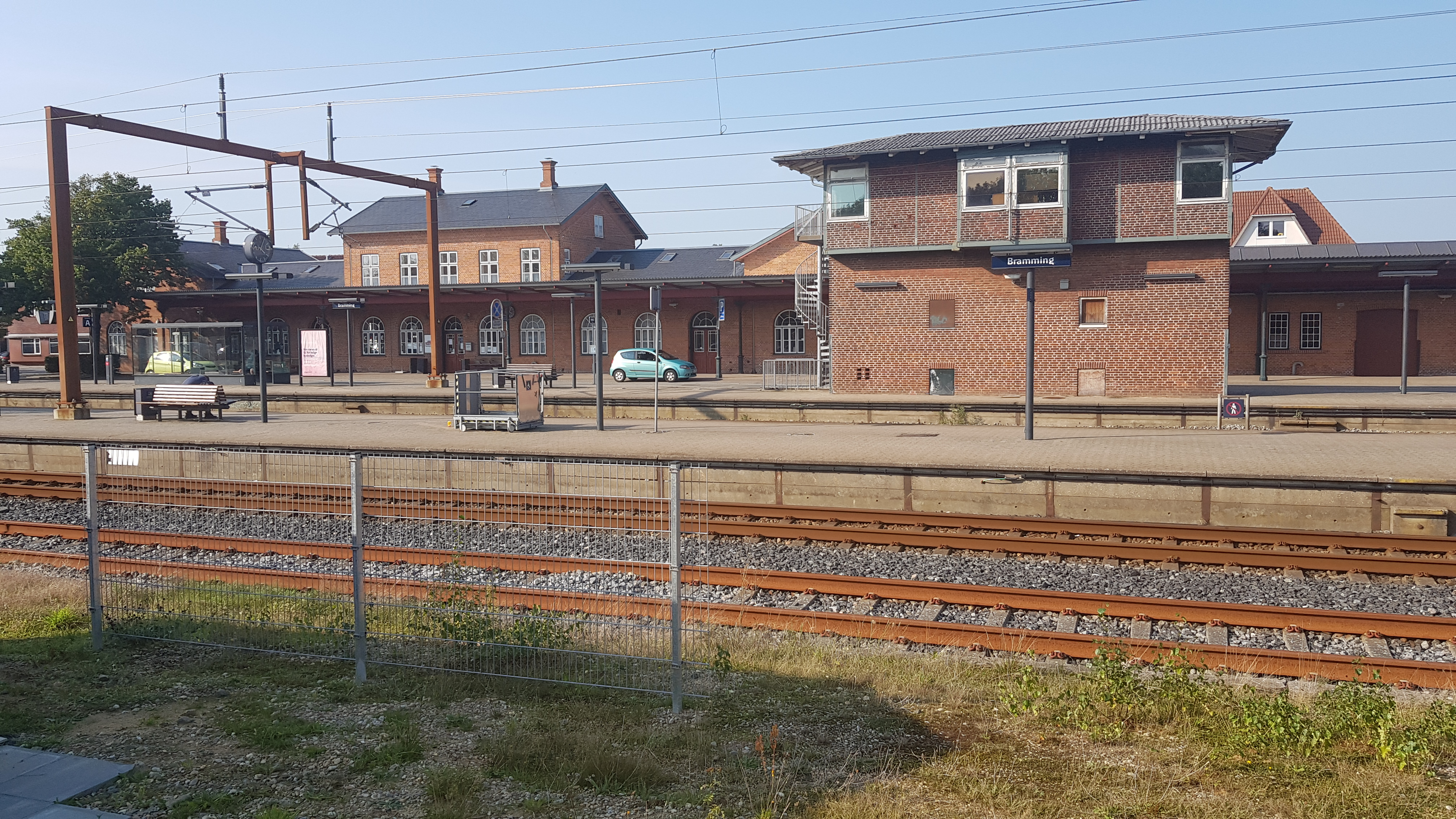

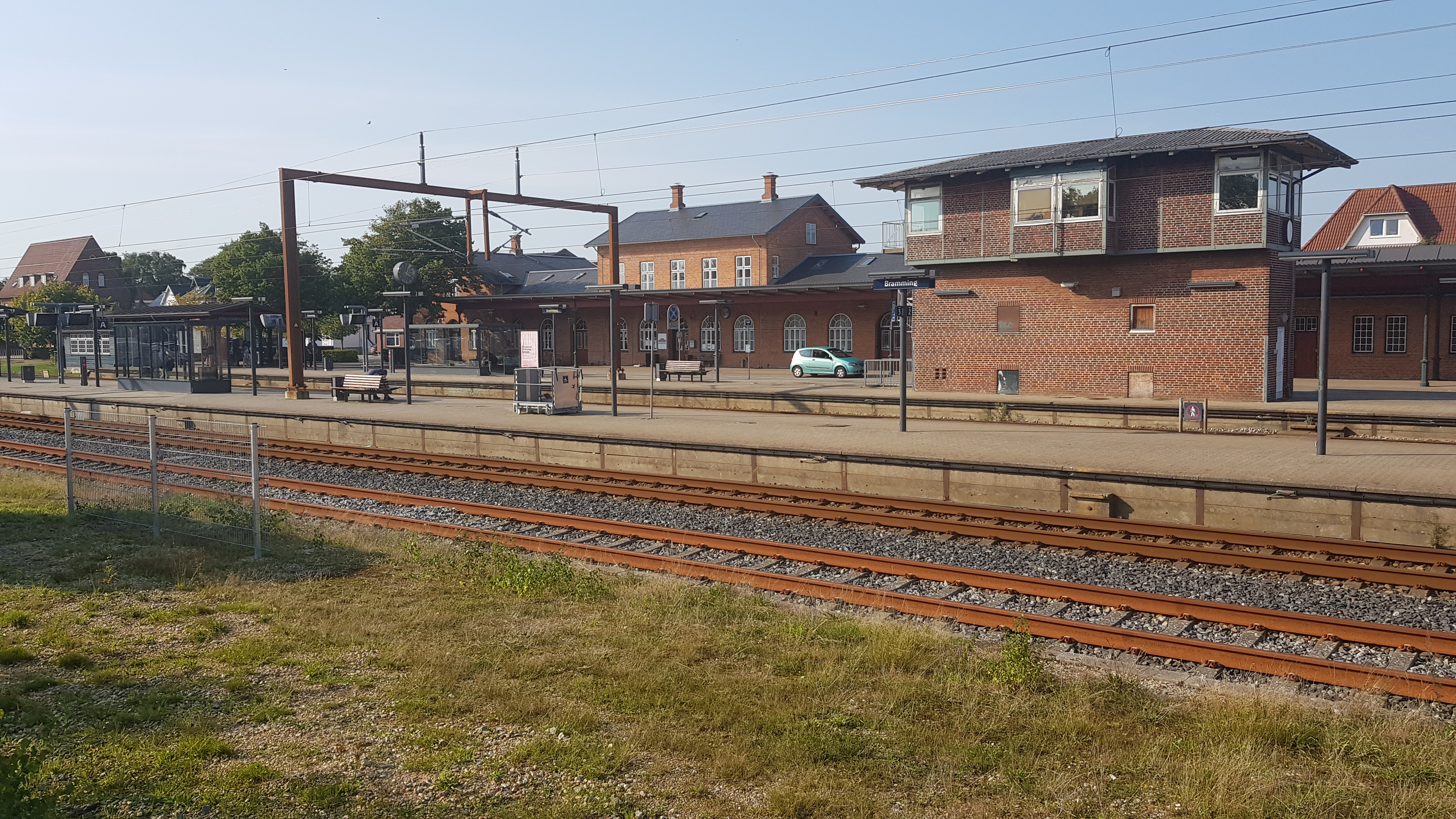

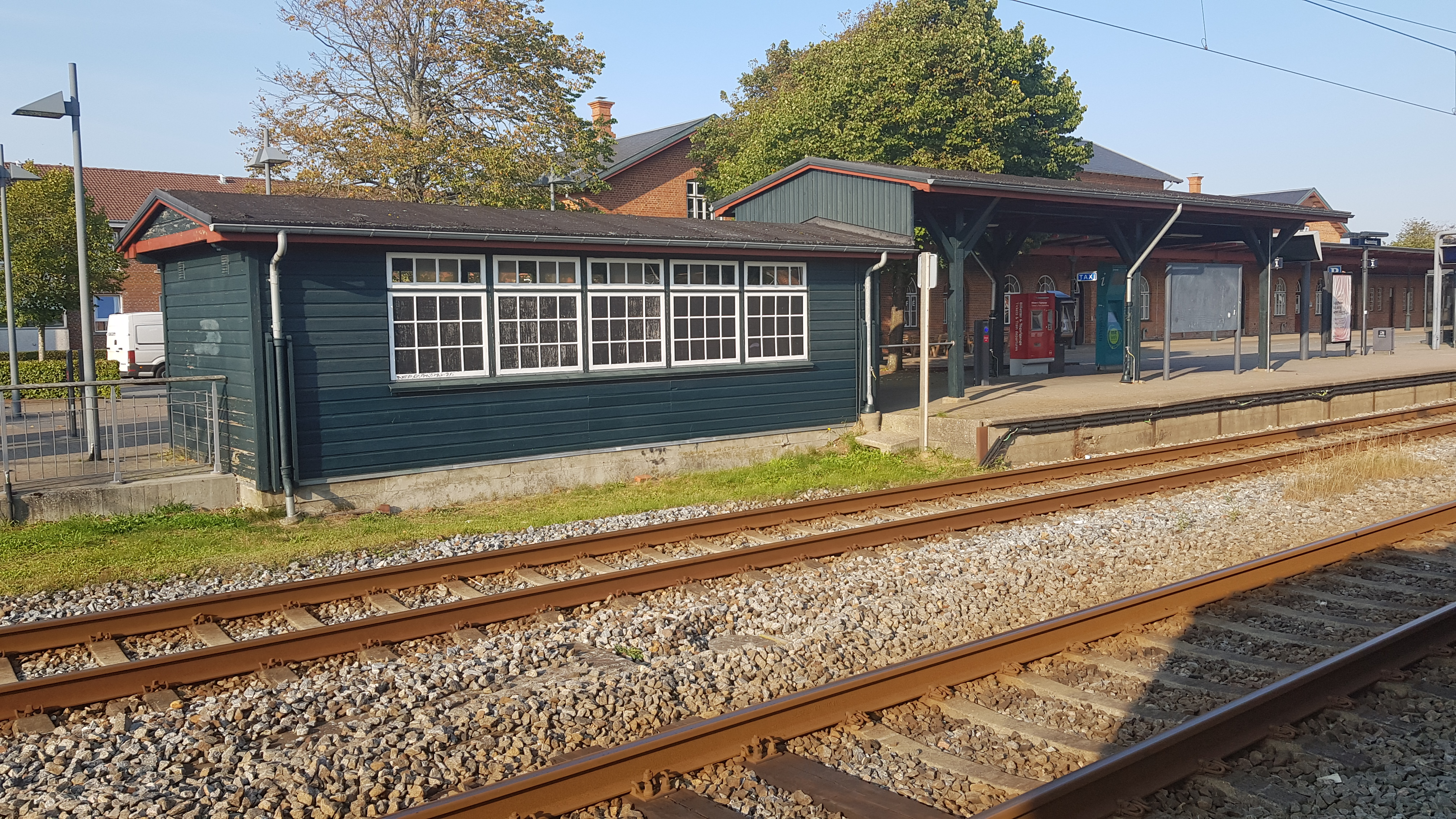

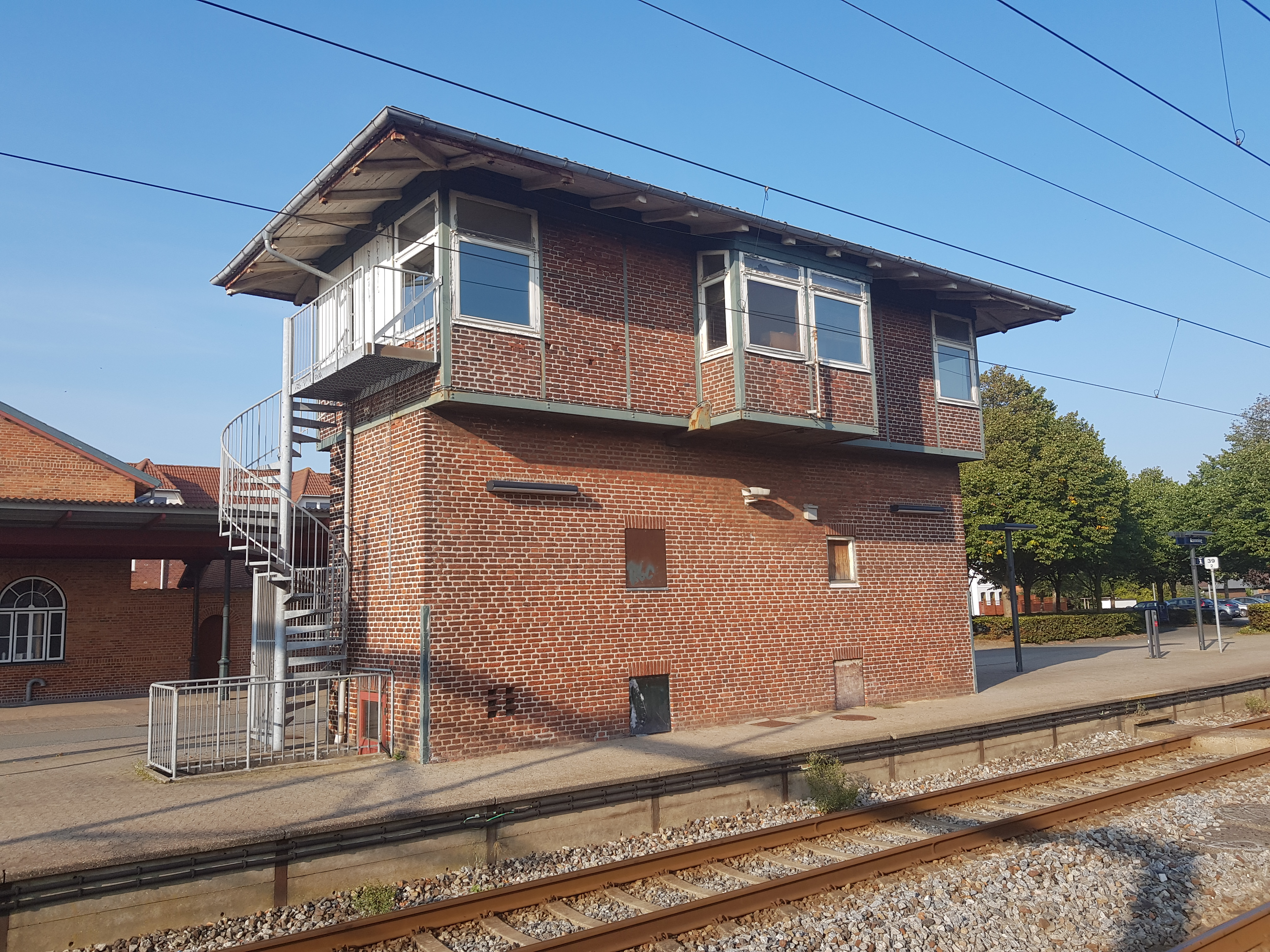

== See also ==
- Bramminge train accident
- List of railway stations in Denmark
- Rail transport in Denmark
- History of rail transport in Denmark
- Transport in Denmark
