= Peter Sabroe =

Danish journalist (1867–1913)

Peter Sabroe (23 January 1867 – 26 July 1913) was a Danish journalist, politician, and children's rights advocate.

== Biography ==
Sabroe was born near Silkeborg in 1867. At the age of fourteen, he moved to Copenhagen to take up an apprenticeship as a shoemaker. He soon became a social democrat and a member of a group of young radicals called the Karl Marx Club.

In 1887, he became a journalist at a provincial newspaper, in Randers, moving the next year to the paper Demokraten in the larger town of Aarhus. There he advanced to serve as editor, from 1895 to 1908. Moving to Kolding, he was editor of the Kolding Socialdemokrat from 1908 to 1910. After that he moved to Copenhagen, where he worked at the Social-Demokraten from 1910 to 1913. He lived and worked in the capital for the rest of his life.

Sabroe was first elected to political office in 1900, as a member of the Aarhus town council. He was re-elected and served until 1909. He also served in the Folketinget, from 1901 to 1913.

As a politician, Sabroe took the part of the common man; he was perhaps the best known and most controversial left-wing legislator of his time. He often traveled around Denmark, drawing attention to the conditions in which children lived and worked.

Sabroe died in the Bramminge train accident in 1913.

== Legacy ==
After Sabroe's death, a fund was raised in his honor. It was used to maintain a children's home, as he had long worked on child welfare.

In addition, the annual Peter Sabroe prize was established and endowed in his honor. It is awarded to persons or institutions who have made an important contribution to improving the lives of children in Denmark. Awardees are evaluated and selected by a panel of people working in this field.
