= Bramminge train accident =

1913 railway incident in Denmark

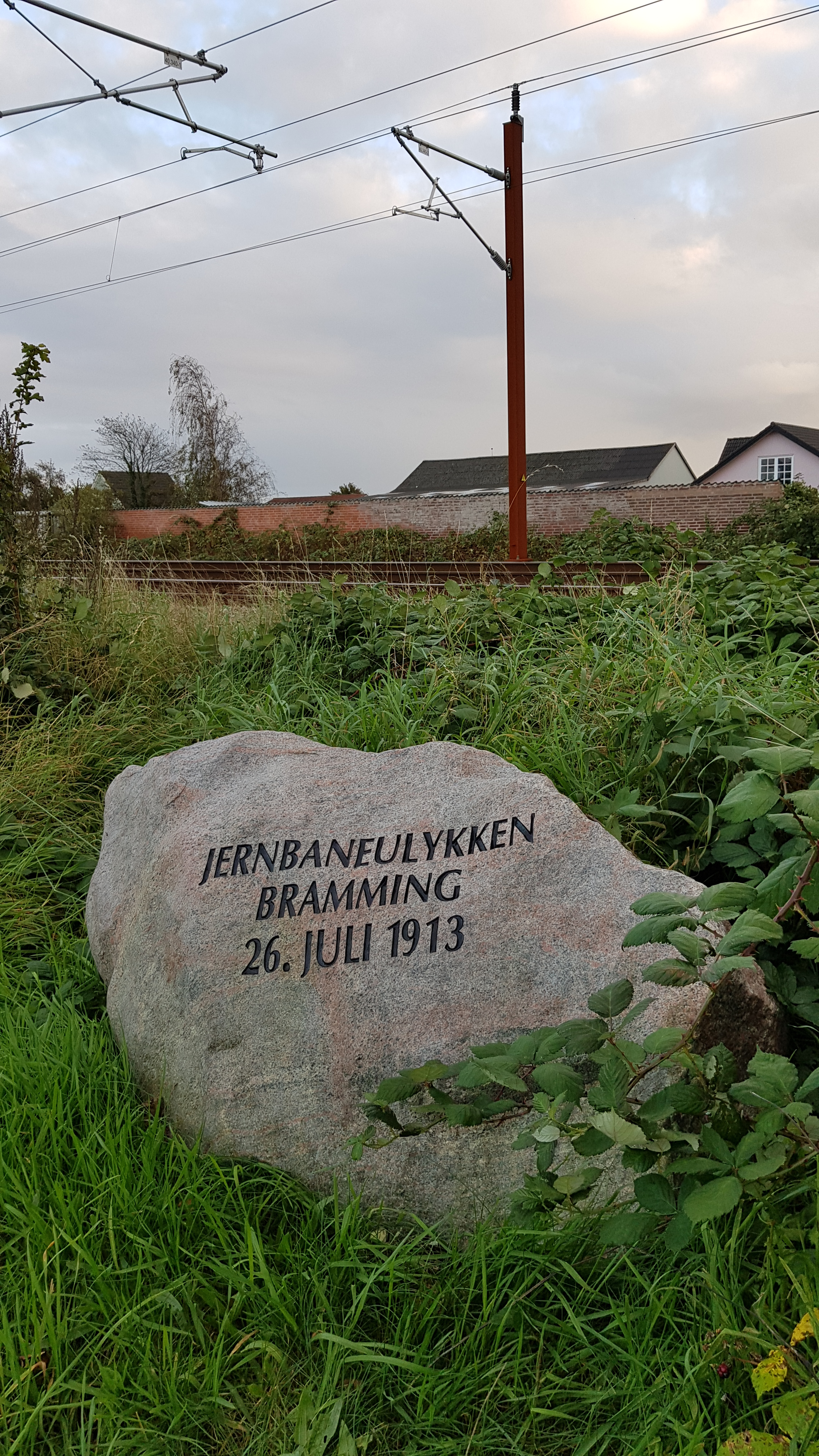
- Memorial stone of the Bramminge railroad accident on the site

Details
- Date: 26 July 1913; 16:11
- Location: Bramming (then Bramminge)
- Coordinates: 55°27′49″N 8°41′08″E
- Country: Denmark
- Operator: DSB
- Incident type: Derailment
- Cause: Heat-stressed rails

Statistics
- Trains: 1
- Passengers: 279
- Deaths: 15
- Injured: about 80
- Damage: 1.2 mio. DKK

The Bramminge railway accident happened in Denmark on 26 July 1913, when train 1029 (known as the Emigrant) servicing the route from Copenhagen to Esbjerg derailed soon after passing the station at Bramminge (now spelled Bramming) 20 km east of Esbjerg. Fifteen people died and an estimated 80 were injured.

== What happened and why ==
Express 1029 was due to depart from Fredericia at 14:50. The train, which included through-coaches from Copenhagen, was larger than usual, so an A-class locomotive was added to the usual K-class locomotive. In addition to the locomotives, the train was made up of a covered goods van, a mail van, a bogie carriage, three wooden compartment coaches (direct access from platform to compartments: no corridor), including two four-wheelers built in 1865, and four more bogie carriages.

The train finally pulled out at 15:06. By its arrival at Lunderskov, the train had made up three minutes of its delay and seemed likely to make up the rest without running too fast.

The maximum permitted speed through stations was 75 km/h (roughly 47 mph), and on open track 90 km/h (roughly 56 mph). Statements by passengers and staff afterward suggested that the train's pace was much faster than usual – perhaps up to 120 km/h. The inspector's report states that the maximum permitted speed was probably exceeded (up to 105 km/h (roughly 65 mph), but not irresponsibly.

When the train had passed Bramming station, the fireman on the leading locomotive saw a small sharp curve on the track ahead. A gang of railway workers were raising the track, and the ballast had been scraped away from the sleepers where the track was being raised.

Later investigstion found that thermal expansion had warped the rails in this section. Removal of ballast during repairs is thought to have been a key reason for this result. The track had previously settled and had been corrected by stakes, but nothing else had been done to rectify the problem. The foreman of the track gang could have requested that trains be required to reduce speed for this section, but had not thought it necessary.

The front locomotive continued over the warped track, the tender was derailed, and the first locomotive broke loose from the second engine and the carriages. The second locomotive ran off the track in a gentle curve, and the rest of the train (except for the last carriage, which stayed on the track) overturned. 15 people died in the accident, including journalist Peter Sabroe. 14 of the dead had been traveling in the older compartment coaches, which were completely crushed in the derailment. About 80 people were injured.
