= Jernved, Esbjerg Municipality =

Jernved
- Village
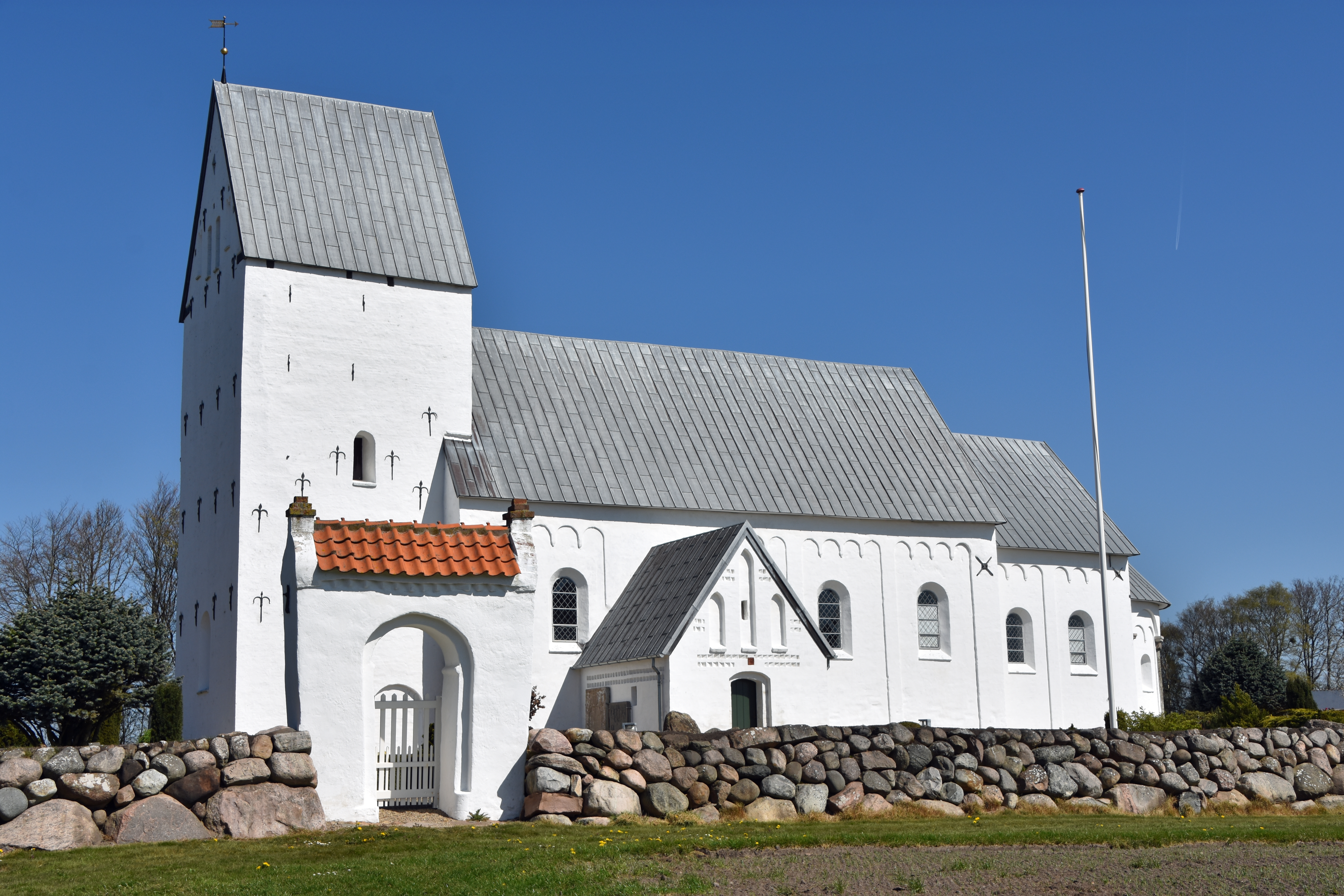
- Jernved Church

- Location in Region of Southern Denmark Jernved (Denmark)
- Coordinates: 55°25′16″N 8°47′56″E
- Country: Denmark
- Region: Southern Denmark
- Municipality: Esbjerg Municipality
- Parish: Jernved Parish

Population (2026)
  - Total: 312

Jernved is a village with a population of 312 (1 January 2026), in Esbjerg Municipality, Region of Southern Denmark in Denmark.

Jernved Church is located in the village.
