= Bramming =

- Town
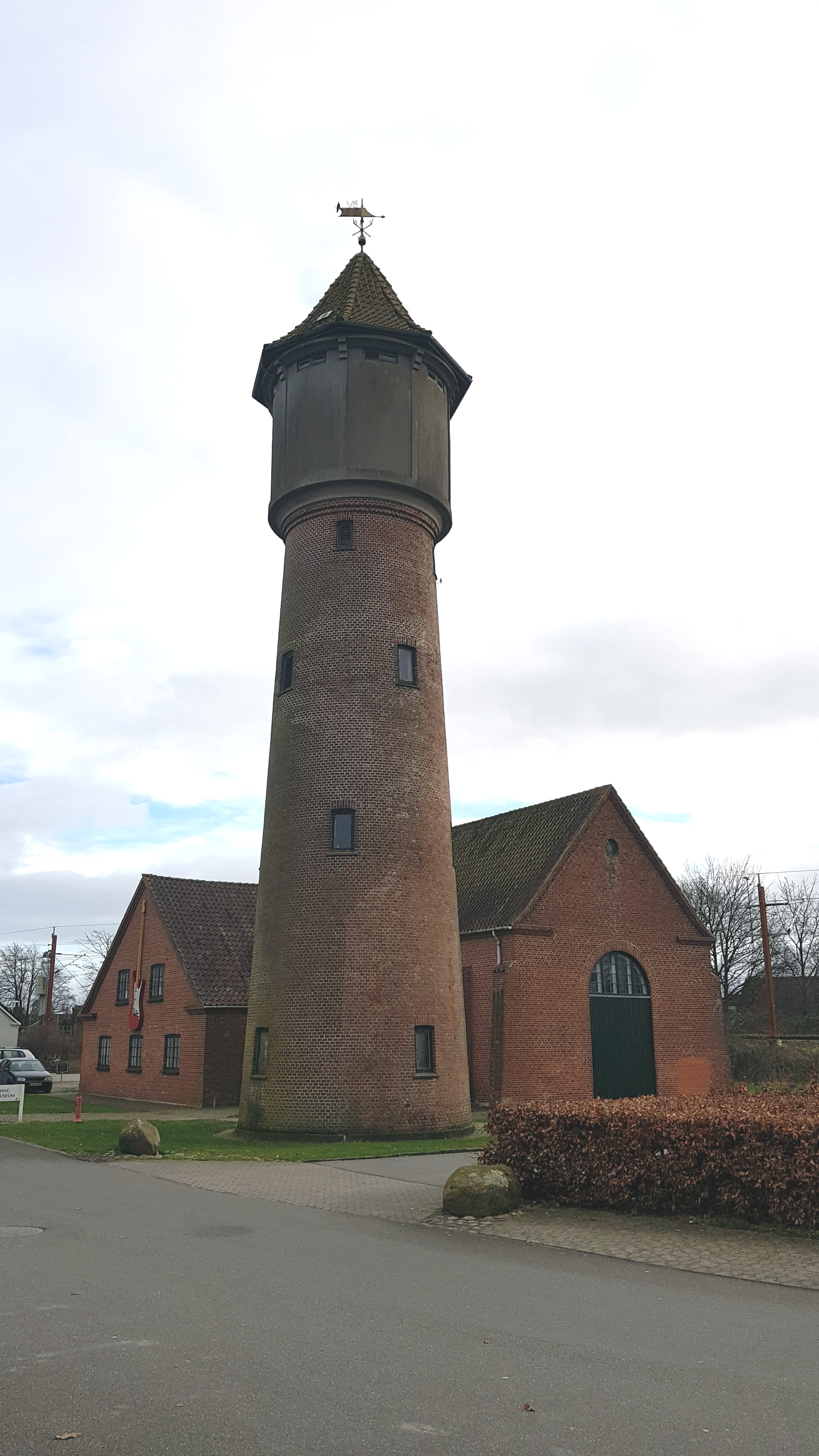
- The watertower and museum in Bramming

- Location in Denmark Bramming (Region of Southern Denmark)
- Coordinates: 55.46487°N 8.70677°E
- Country: Denmark
- Region: Southern Denmark
- Municipality: Esbjerg Municipality

Area
  - Urban: 5.4 km^{2} (2.1 sq mi)

Population (2026)
  - Urban: 7,244
  - Urban density: 1,300/km^{2} (3,500/sq mi)
  - Gender: 3,541 males and 3,703 females
- Time zone: UTC+1 (CET)
  - Summer (DST): UTC+2 (CEST)
- Postal code: DK-6740 Bramming

Bramming is a railway town in southwestern Denmark, with a population of 7,244 (as of the 2026 census), in Esbjerg Municipality, Region of Southern Denmark in Denmark. It is located 24 km southeast of Varde, 19 km north of Ribe, 40 km southwest of Grindsted and 19 km east of Esbjerg.

Bramming is served by Bramming railway station which is located on the Lunderskov–Esbjerg railway line, and is also the northern terminus of the Bramming–Tønder railway line.

Bramming was the municipal seat of the former Bramming Municipality until 1 January 2007.

== Churches ==
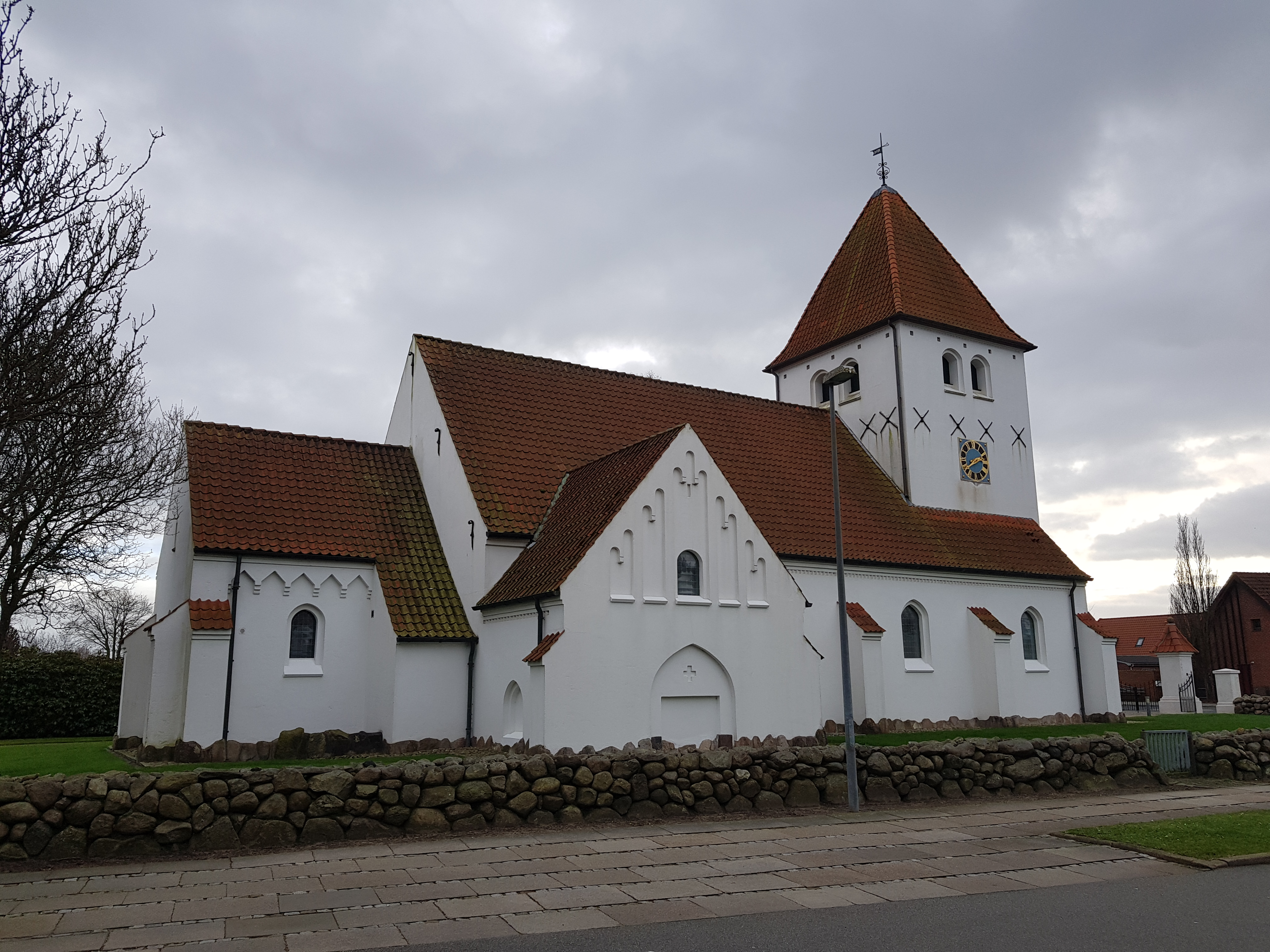
Skt. Ansgar Church

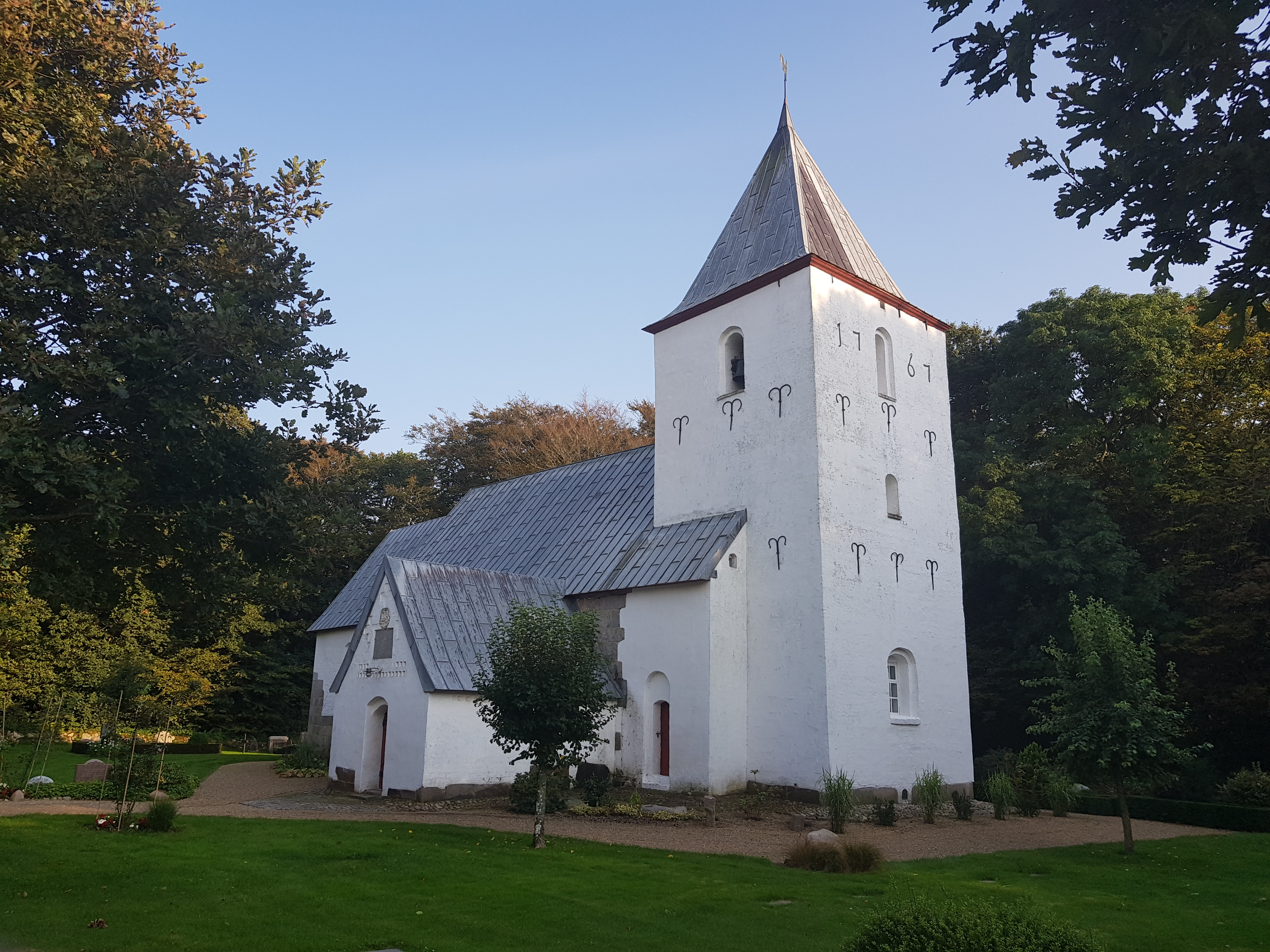
Skt. Knud Church

There are two churches located in the Bramming area. Skt. Ansgar Church, consecrated in 1915, is located in the railway town, and the medieval Skt. Knud Church is located on the northern outskirts of the town. This church served the neighboring manor Bramming Hovedgård, now Southwest Jutland's Boarding School.

== The museum ==
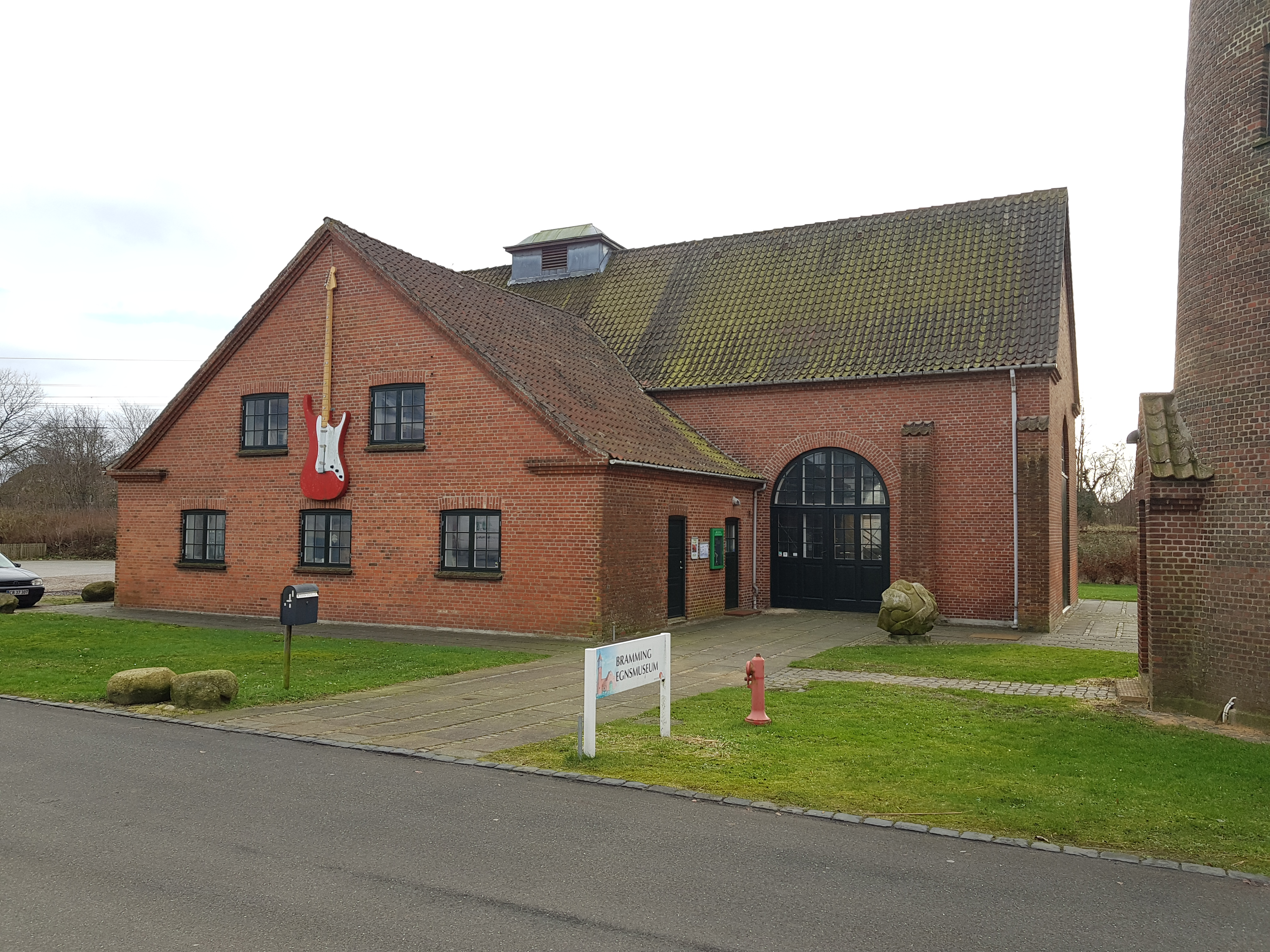
Bramming Egnsmuseum

Bramming Egnsmuseum, located by the water tower, is a museum where changing exhibitions on cultural history, art and crafts are displayed. In 2007, the so-called Historium opened, which is a 5.5 m high glass display case of almost 100 m^{3}. Here, both the Bramming region's and Southwest Jutland's cultural history and features of Danish cultural history as a whole are exhibited.

== See also ==
- Bramminge train accident
