= Bramming–Tønder railway line =

Railway line in Denmark

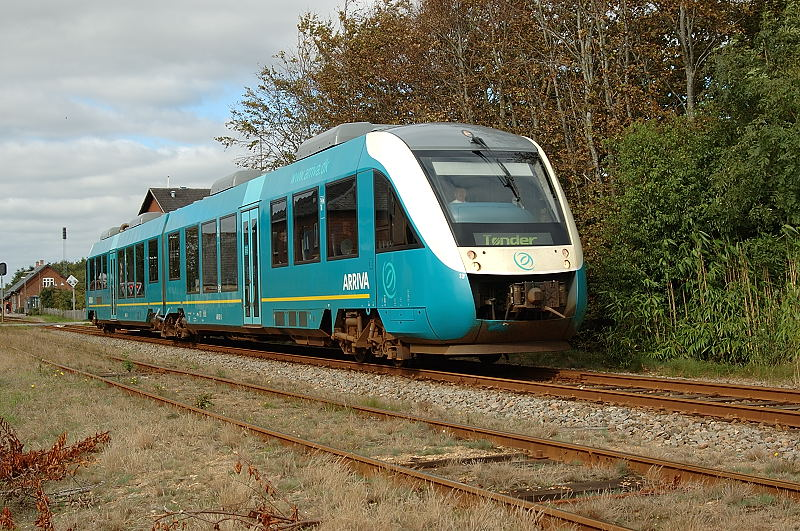
- The Bramming–Tønder railway line near Gredstedbro in 2020

Overview
- Native name: Bramming-Tønder-banen
- Status: Operational
- Owner: Banedanmark
- Line number: 30
- Termini: Bramming; Tønder
- Stations: 14

Service
- Type: Heavy rail
- System: Danish railway
- Operator(s): GoCollective

History
- Opened: 1 May 1875 (Bramming–Ribe); 15 November 1887 (Ribe–Tønder)

Technical
- Line length: 67.9 km (42.2 mi)
- Number of tracks: Single track
- Character: Passenger trains Freight trains
- Track gauge: 1,435 mm (4 ft 8 1/2 in) standard gauge
- Operating speed: 100 km/h (Bramming–Tønder); 60 km/h (Tønder–German border
The Bramming–Tønder railway line
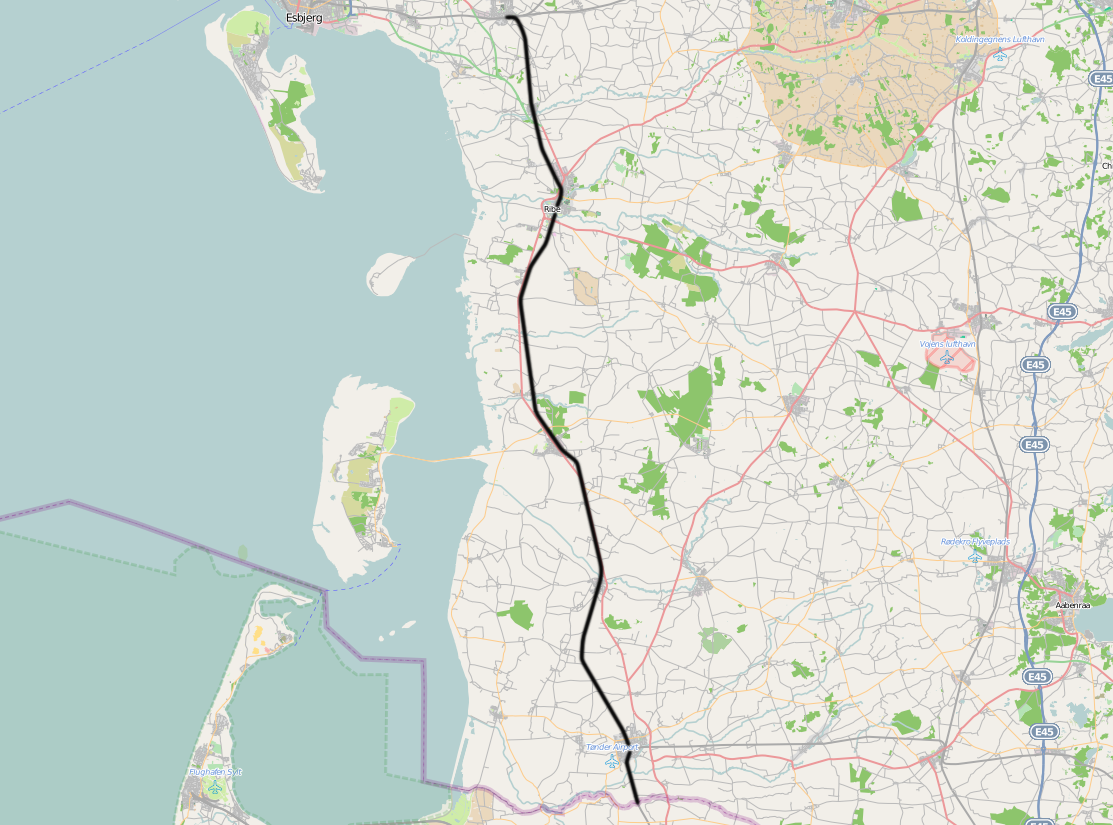
Map of the Bramming–Tønder railway line between Bramming and the German border

The Bramming–Tønder railway line (Danish: Bramming-Tønder-banen) is a 67.9 kilometres (42.2 mi) long railway line in Denmark which runs through the historical region of Southern Jutland between Bramming and the German border just south of Tønder. The standard gauge railway line is single track and unelectrified.

The railway line is historically a part of the Marsh Railway (German: Marschbahn), the through route along the west coast of Schleswig-Holstein from the city of Elmshorn to Bramming. Today, the line continues to the German border just south of Tønder, where it connects to the rump section of the Marsh railway and the German railway network.

== Stations ==
- Bramming, connection with the Lunderskov–Esbjerg railway line to Lunderskov and Esbjerg
- Sejstrup
- Gredstedbro
- Ribe Nørremark
- Ribe
- Vedsted, border station until 1920, closed 1987
- Hviding
- Rejsby
- Brøns
- Skærbæk
- Døstrup Sønderjylland
- Bredebro
- Visby
- Tønder Nord
- Tønder, connection with the Marsh Railway to Niebüll

== See also ==
- List of railway lines in Denmark
- Rail transport in Denmark
- History of rail transport in Denmark
- Denmark–Germany border
