= Geskel Saloman =

Danish–Swedish portrait and genre painter

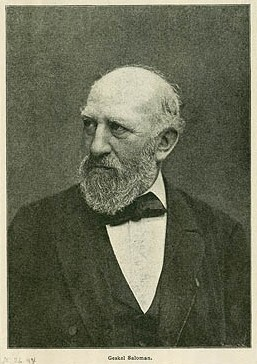
Geskel Saloman, from the Royal Library, Copenhagen

Geskel Saloman (1 April 1821 in Tønder – July 5, 1902 in Båstad) was a Danish–Swedish portrait and genre painter. Soloman was one of the Bedřich Smetana's closest friends and painter of one of the three existing portraits of the founder of the Czech national music, then only 34 years old.

== Life ==
Geskel Saloman (née Solomon) was the son of merchant Isak Soloman, who later became cantor of the Jewish community in Copenhagen (1782–1848), and Veilchen Geskel (1787–1836). He had two brothers: Siegfried Saloman, a well-known violinist and composer, and Nota Salomon (1823–1885), chief medical officer in the Danish army. When his parents moved to Copenhagen, he entered the Royal Swedish Academy of Arts, where he won the 1846 small silver medal. He was a pupil of Johan Ludwig Lund and has exhibited since 1843, among them the painter Conrad Christian Bøhndel portrait and Thomas Overskou portrait for which he won the Neuhausenske Præmier in 1848.

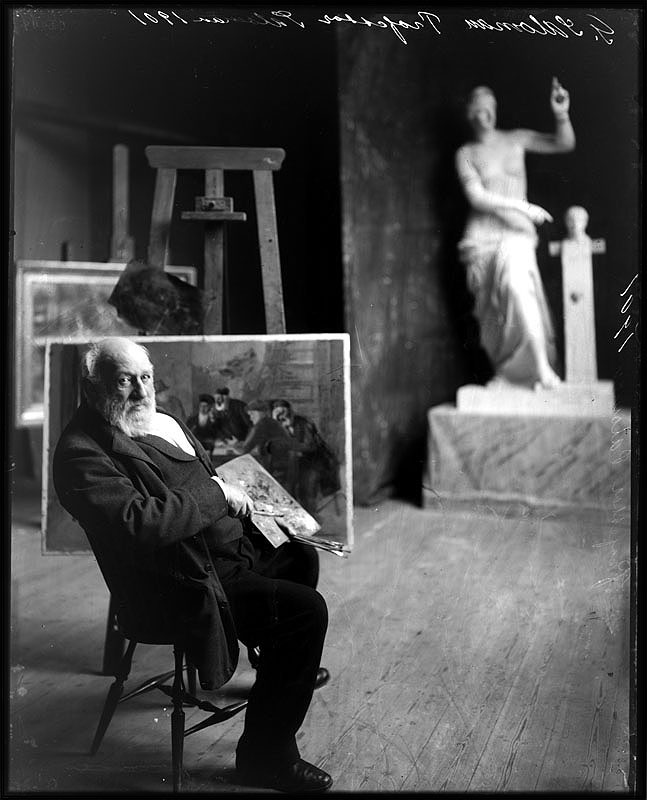
Saloman in his studio. (1901)

A short stay in Gothenburg led to him to become a resident in Sweden from 1850, where he received citizenship. In Gothenburg he enjoyed great reputation as a portrait painter, but also did some genre paintings which he partially exhibited in Copenhagen. He was also a character interested in giving drawing lessons, being offered a position as teacher in 1871 at the Göteborgs Musei Rit-och Målarskola, now Konsthögskolan Valand; becoming a member of the Art Academy in Stockholm from 1874. There, he became professor at the academy and the royal portrait painter.

After resigning from the academy, he became a highly sought portrait painter in Sweden, but performed ever greater tasks, partly in genre pictures and later in historical compositions, or rather what we call "the historical genre", preserving even in his old age his freshness in painting. One of his earlier works, En Væverske med sit Barn, exhibited in Copenhagen in 1858, was given the honorable mention at the Salon de Paris, where he studied under the guidance of Thomas Couture between the years 1854-1855. From 1860 to 1863 he lived in the city of Algiers.

Another older picture, news from the News from the Crimean War (1855), belongs to the Museum in Gothenburg, while A Young Girl With A Letter (1872) belongs to the National Museum in Stockholm. In decorative terms a very powerful image, though not weighty enough for content prize, The Home-Coming of the Victor (1881), was bestowed upon King Oscar II of Sweden for his silver wedding anniversary. His latest work is the Gustav Vasa and Dalkarlene (1886) and Marsk Stigs Daughters (1893), which belongs to the National Museum in Stockholm, and finally Ahasuerus and the Angel of Death, exhibited 1896. Saloman was in 1855 married to Ida Jacobson (1828–1863) from Gothenburg, daughter of banker Morris Jacobson (1800–1870). He also appeared as a writer, especially in studies of Venus de Milo.

== Works ==
- A Game of L'Hombre (1845)
- The First Violin Lesson (1846)
- The First-Born (1852)
- The Weaver Woman (1856)
- The Emigrants (1858)
- News from the Crimean War (1855)
- The Chicken Sacrifice (1862)
- A Young Girl with a Letter (1872)
- The Home-Coming of the Victor (1881)
- Gustavus Vasa and the Dalecarlians (1886)
- Marsk Stigs Daughters (1893)
- Ahasuerus and the Angel of Death (1896)
- The Blessing of the Sabbath Lights (1900)

== Literary works ==
- The Restoration of the Venus de Milo, 1895, with plates
- The Sandalbinder: an Archaeological Essay, 1885
- The Statue of the Vatican or Belvedere Apollo, Central-druckerei, 1882

== Gallery ==
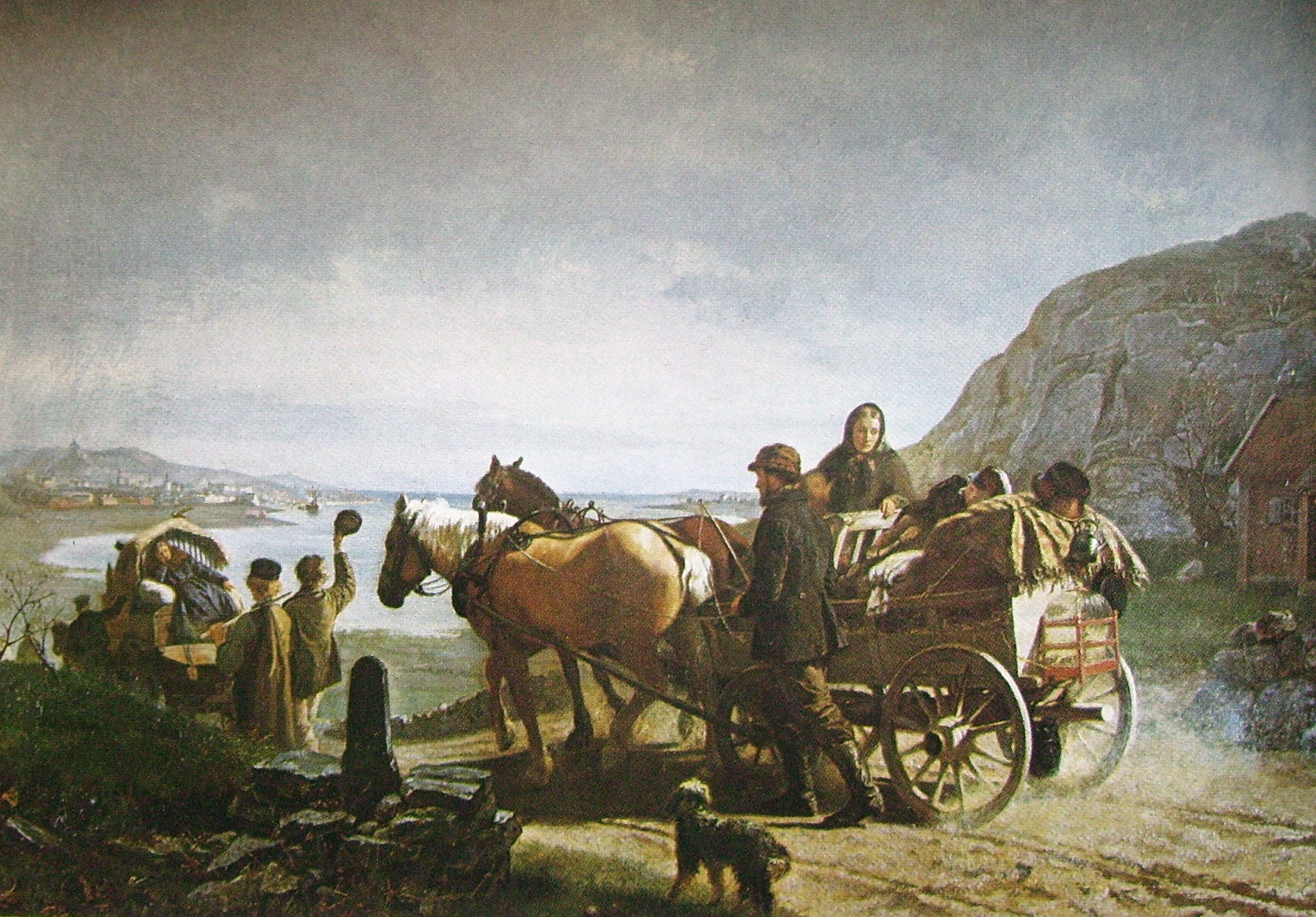
Emigration (1872)

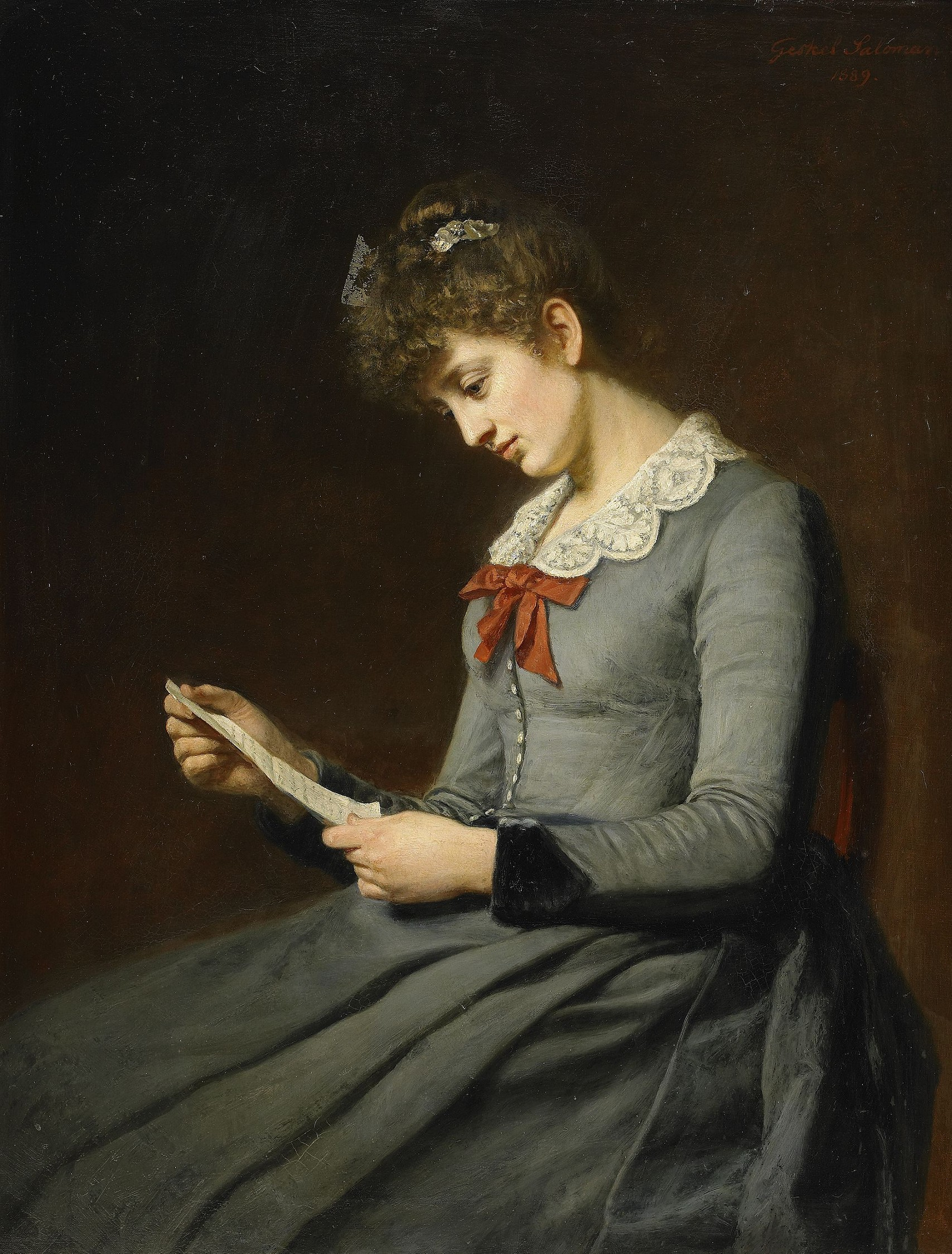
The Love Letter (1889)

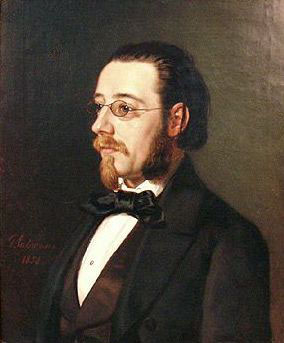
Bedřich Smetana (1837)

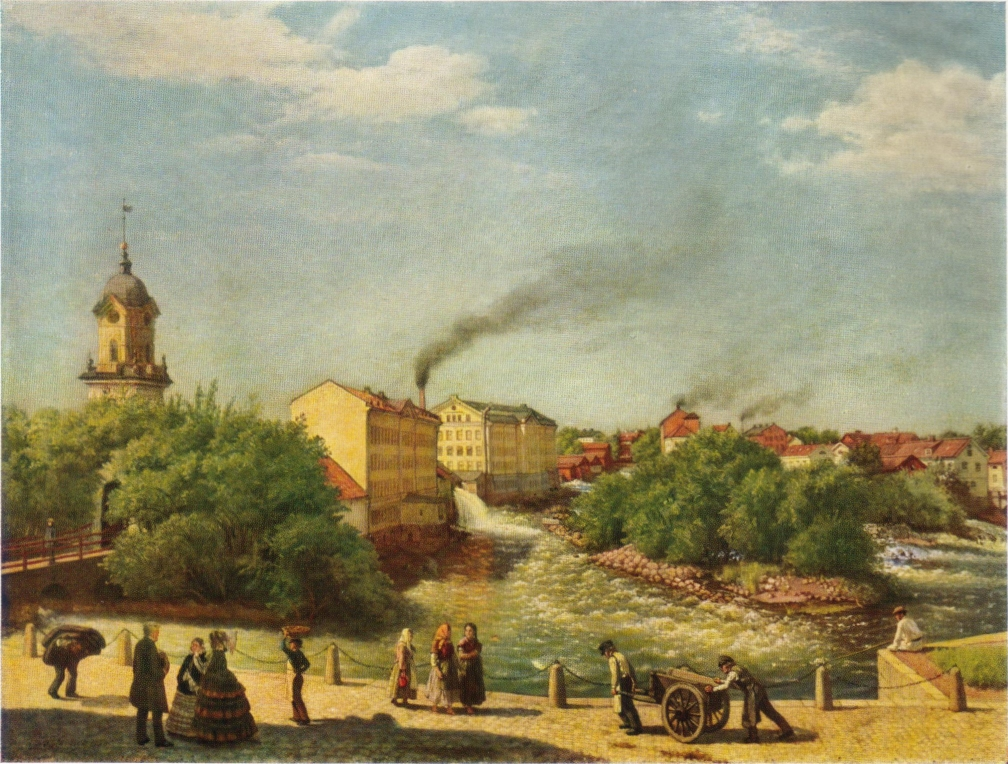
View of Holmen (1858)
