= Siegfried Saloman =

Danish violinist and composer

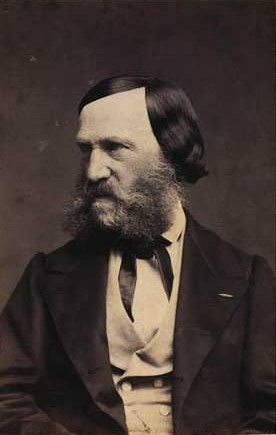
Siegfried Saloman, Danish violinist and composer. Photo: Hansen, Schou & Weller

Siegfried Saloman (2 October 1816 – 22 July 1899) was a Danish violinist and composer. A contemporary of Franz Liszt, he was a pupil of Johannes Frederik Fröhlich, Holger Simon Paulli, Frederik Thorkildsen Wexschall and Johan Peter Emilius Hartmann, from whom he received violin-playing lessons. He toured extensively throughout Europe with the Swedish opera singer Henriette Nissen, to whom he was married in 1850.

In 1842, his nine booklets of romances and songs were published in Hamburg.

== Life ==
Siegfried Saloman, born Solomon, was born in Tønder, the son of the merchant Isaac Solomon (1782-1848) and Veilchen Geskel (1787-1836). He was the brother of the artist and the founder of the Gothenburg Museum of Art, Geskel Saloman (1821-1902), and Nota Saloman (1823–85), who was a chief medical officer for the Danish army. Since his father's business was no longer doing so well, the family moved to Copenhagen in 1829. As early as age 12, Siegfried Saloman already played the violin, so he continued his studies in Copenhagen under the guidance of J. P. E. Hartmann, among others. In 1838 he received a 3-year scholarship which he used to stay in Dessau, where he studied music theory and composition with Friedrich Schneider. He spent the last six months of the scholarship period in Dresden, where he continued his studies with Karol Lipiński.

He became a teacher in Copenhagen, Germany and St. Petersburg, where he lived for a few years. Together with his wife, the Swedish opera singer Henriette Nissen, he made extensive concert tours in Europe. The couple were married in 1850 in the Netherlands. After his wife's death in 1879 he began living in Stockholm. He died in Dalarö, Sweden.

His first songs Tordenskjold i Dynekilen and Diamantkorset had no success in Copenhagen, and his third ballad opera, Hjertet på prøve, was not well accepted either. Therefore, in 1847 he left Copenhagen and traveled to Germany where his Diamantkorset was well received in Berlin and Leipzig. In 1850 he was invited to Weimar by Franz Liszt, where his comic opera Das Korps der Rache was written. His Stockholm years were particularly important in his career once several of his early works and a number of new ones were written. He died after a few years of infirmity contracted during a summer stay on the Swedish island of Dalarö.

== Works ==
- Tordenskjold in Dynekilen, singspiel in three acts, first performed on 23 May 1844 at the Royal Danish Theatre
- Diamantkorset, singspiel in three acts, first performed on 20 March 1847 at the Royal Danish Theatre
- The Scandinavian brothers, drama in five acts, premiered on 13 June 1844 at the Royal Danish Theatre
- Das Korps der Rache, comic opera, premiered in 1850 in Weimar
- Karpaternas Rose, premiered on 7 January 1868 in Moscow and performed in Stockholm in 1881
- Flyktingen Från Estrella, opera
- In Brittany, opera, performed in 1898 in Stockholm
- Led vid lifvet, opera
- Nuptial music and Wedding march, exclusively written by Siegfired, kapellmeister for the King of Denmark, for his son the Prince of Wales Edward VII's royal wedding ceremony with Princess Alexandra of Denmark on 10 March 1863.

== Literature ==
- Fryklund, Daniel: Henriette Nissen, Siegfried Saloman. Hälsingborg, 1929.
