= Tønder lace =

Type of bobbin lace from Denmark

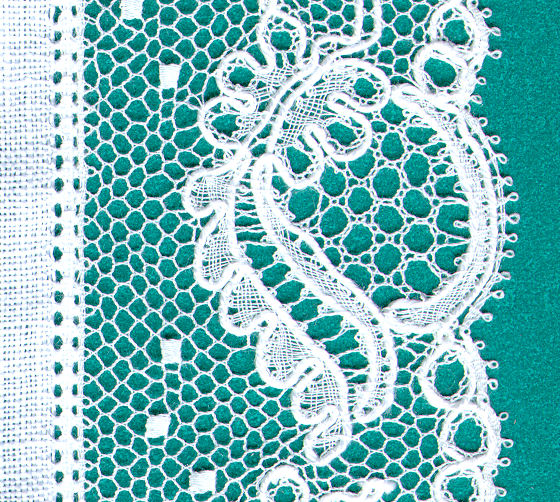
- Traditional Tønder lace motif Jordbær (Strawberries)
- Type: Lace
- Material: Linen or cotton
- Production method: Bobbin lace
- Production process: Craft production
- Place of origin: Tønder, Denmark
- Introduced: c. 1850

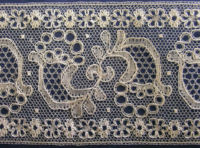
Tønder Knipling

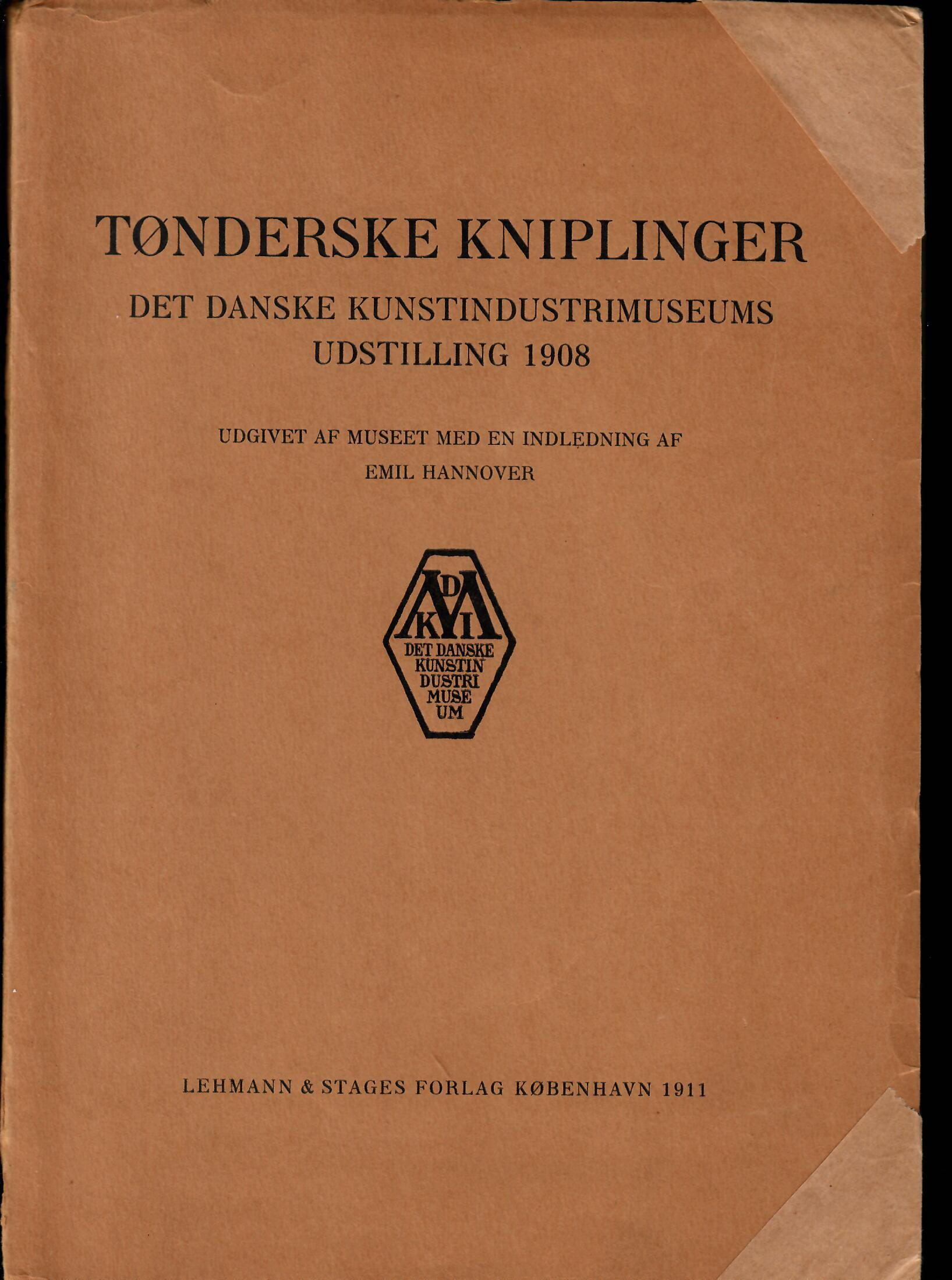
Museum exhibition book on Danish lace collections

Tønder lace is a point-ground type of handmade bobbin lace identified with the Tønder region of Denmark since about 1850, although lace of many types has been made there since as early as 1650. The term is also used more broadly, to refer to any bobbin lace made in Denmark.

Tønder lace was traditionally made in fine linen thread, imported from the Netherlands. Since the disappearance of the very fine linen threads, it has commonly been made in cotton. It is characterized by honeycomb fillings in motifs, square tallies in the ground, and the use of a gimp, a heavy thread outlining the cloth-stitch motifs. It often had large holes in the motif, called "Copenhagen holes", which were an attempt on the part of the lacemakers to speed up production of the lace, as they strove to compete with the cheaper machine lace. The designs used were similar to Mechlin lace, with many flowers.

== History ==
Tønder lace was mainly made during the late 18th and early 19th centuries. Production started in 1647 when a merchant brought lacemakers from Westphalia to Tønder to teach lacemaking to the general population. Christian IV protected the manufacture of local lace, and didn't wear any foreign lace. In 1712 several lacemakers from Brabant accompanied the troops of King Frederick IV on their return from the Netherlands, bringing new techniques. Tønder lace was a major industry, and most of the region's girls were employed in making it. Little boys, before they were strong enough to work in the fields, were also taught to make lace. In 1801 20,000 people in Tønder and the immediately surrounding area were employed making lace. When machine-made lace was introduced in the late 1800s, the handmade lace industry gradually ceased to be economically important to the region. It never died out entirely though, and is still made today, mostly by hobbyists.

A museum exhibition in 1908 provided examples of many historical laces in the Tønder style, as well as examples of the typical carved and beaded bobbins and lace pillow styles in use in the region.

Reproductions of historical laces have been done by contemporary lacemakers, and interpretations of Tønder in new ways is ongoing.

== See also ==
- Hansigne Lorenzen
