= Frederik Thorkildsen Wexschall =

Danish composer and violinist (1798 - 1845)

Frederick Thorkildsen Wexschall (born 9 April 1798 in Copenhagen, died 25 October 1845) was a Danish classical composer, violinist, and concertmaster of the Copenhagen Royal Orchestra. A pupil of Bohemian composer František Martin Pecháček and German conductor Louis Spohr, Wexschall was married to the Danish stage actress and mezzo-soprano opera singer Anna Nielsen.

== Life ==
He was the son of John Thorkildsen Wexsal, a Norwegian farmer's son who became chief huntsman to the Danish Crown Prince, and later manager of the Amalienborg Palace, and Jacobine Caroline, née Holm. In 1823 he was married to the Danish actress and opera singer Anna Nielsen; the marriage was dissolved in 1831, and later he married Caroline, née Dam (d. 1848).

Taught on violin, first by his father and later by music professor Peter Mandrup Lem, he was already appearing at concert halls at a very young age. In June 1812 he became a pupil in the chapel of concert master Christian Tiemroth, evolving to an excellent violin player. Between 1820 and 1822 he traveled with abroad, where he studied under masters such as Karl Moser in Berlin, Pecháček in Vienna and Spohr in Kassel, and gave concerts, which were well received even in the perfectly pampered violin playing circles in Paris. Critics called him Wexschall, and reviews like this he kept for the future, perhaps as a small persiflage against Professor Schall, who always ignored him.

Despite the universal acclaim at home and abroad Wexschall did not advance to a higher position than 2nd ballet Répétiteur and 1st second violinist in the chapel after his return to Copenhagen in 1824, but he gradually worked his way to becoming the person whose strong and broad bow-strokes led the ensemble in the orchestra, and by Schall's death Wexschall became director of the royal violin school with predicate of concert master in 1835. Among his students must be mentioned the names of Holger Simon Paulli, Ole Bull and Niels Gade. The music scene suffered a great loss as a corrosive disease led him to death on 25 October 1845, a year after both his parents died.

== See also ==
- Siegfried Saloman
- Johan Peter Emilius Hartmann

== Additional informations ==
=== References ===
Attribution

- This article is based on the translation of the corresponding article of the Danish Wikipedia. A list of contributors can be found there at the History section.
