= Hansigne Lorenzen =

Danish writer

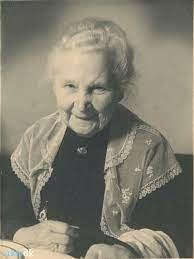
Hansigne Lorenzen (1948)

Hansigne Caroline Marie Lorenzen (1870–1952) was a Danish writer who is remembered for her interest in Danish culture in the part of Southern Jutland which was taken by the Germans in 1864. In 1905, using the pen name Sven Tange, she published her first book Det kæmper et Folk (A People Do Battle) calling for her community to fight against German rule. After publishing two more novels, reverting to her own name she turned to poetry with Arveguld (1919) about the Golden Horns, followed by two collections of verse. Lorenzen is also remembered for tracing the history of lacemaking in her region, publishing old patterns from Tønder and later establishing Det Tønderske Kniplingsdepot (The Tønder Lace Depository).

== Early life and family ==
Born on 30 March 1870 in Bådsbel in the parish of Ballum, now in Tønder Municipality, Hansigne Caroline Marie Jenssen was the daughter of the teacher Jens Andersen Jenssen (1834–1907) and his wife Amma Margrethe née Abild (1833–96). She was brought up in a community which since 1864 had come under German rule but was still mainly Danish. When she was 14, four of her siblings died of diphtheria while her two older brothers emigrated to avoid conscription. Only she and her younger sister Hanne remained with their parents. In 1890, she married Hans Lorenzen (1862–1956), a teacher in her father's school. The couple had five children: Hans (1891), Anna (1893), Marie (1895), Jens (1897) and Catherine (1903).

== Career ==
=== Writing ===
Two years after the birth of her last child, Lorenzen published her first novel Der kæmpter et Folk (1905). To protect her husband from problems with his position in the German school system, she used the male pen name Sven Tange. It was followed in 1907 by Der stander en Strid (There is a Struggle). Together with her later Saa lægges den Sæd (Thus the Seed is Sown, 1911), they all address the need for maintaining Danish culture which she considered was not only threatened by the Germans but was also suffering from ethnic Danes who were beginning to disregard their national heritage. They are all written in Lorenzen's passionate Romantic style revealing her fight against the German occupation. The attraction of Romanticism can be seen in this passage from Saa lægges den Sæd:

To the swaying melody of the waves, white-clad maidens danced in circles and sequences on the open beach; soft and muted, but sweetly alluring like the plucking of golden strings on a mermaid’s harp, their song faded away into the light, clear summer night.

Published in 1911, her last novel Thøge is considered her most accomplished literary work.

After the end of the First World War, she turned to poetry, publishing under her own name. Arveguld, a long poem about the discovery of the Golden Horns, was followed by the poetry collections Tider og Steder (Times and Places, 1927) and Ved Alfarvej (1928). Her play Grænsens Sang (Border Song) was published in 1937.

=== Lacemaking ===
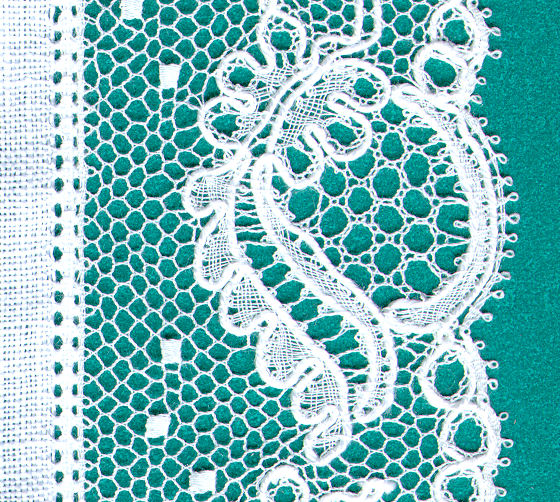
Traditional Tønder lace design

Lorenzen is also remembered for her interest in lacemaking, a craft she had learnt from old lacemakers in the vicinity who at the time specialized in coarse thread for the Germans. She began to collect old lace samples and patterns while encouraging lacemakers to produce once again to the traditional finely textured Tønder lace. By 1913, she was able to sell various old patterns she had discovered. After reunification following the end of the First World War, in 1921 with the support of Queen Alexandine she was able to establish the Tønder Lacemaking Depository (Det Tønderske Kniplingsdepot). With her encouragement, in 1929 her daughter Cathrine founded a lacemaking school in Tønder. In 1942, she contributed a chapter to Kvinden i Danmark titled "Kvindeskikkelser inden for Haandværk og Industri i Sønderjylland" (Women's Figures in Handicrafts and Industry in Southern Jutland). For her contributions to lacemaking, she was honoured with the Royal Medal of Recompense (gold) in 1936.

Hanisgne Lorenzen died in Bådsbøl on 6 November 1952 and was buried in Ballum.
