= Tønder =

Tønder Tondern (German)
- Town
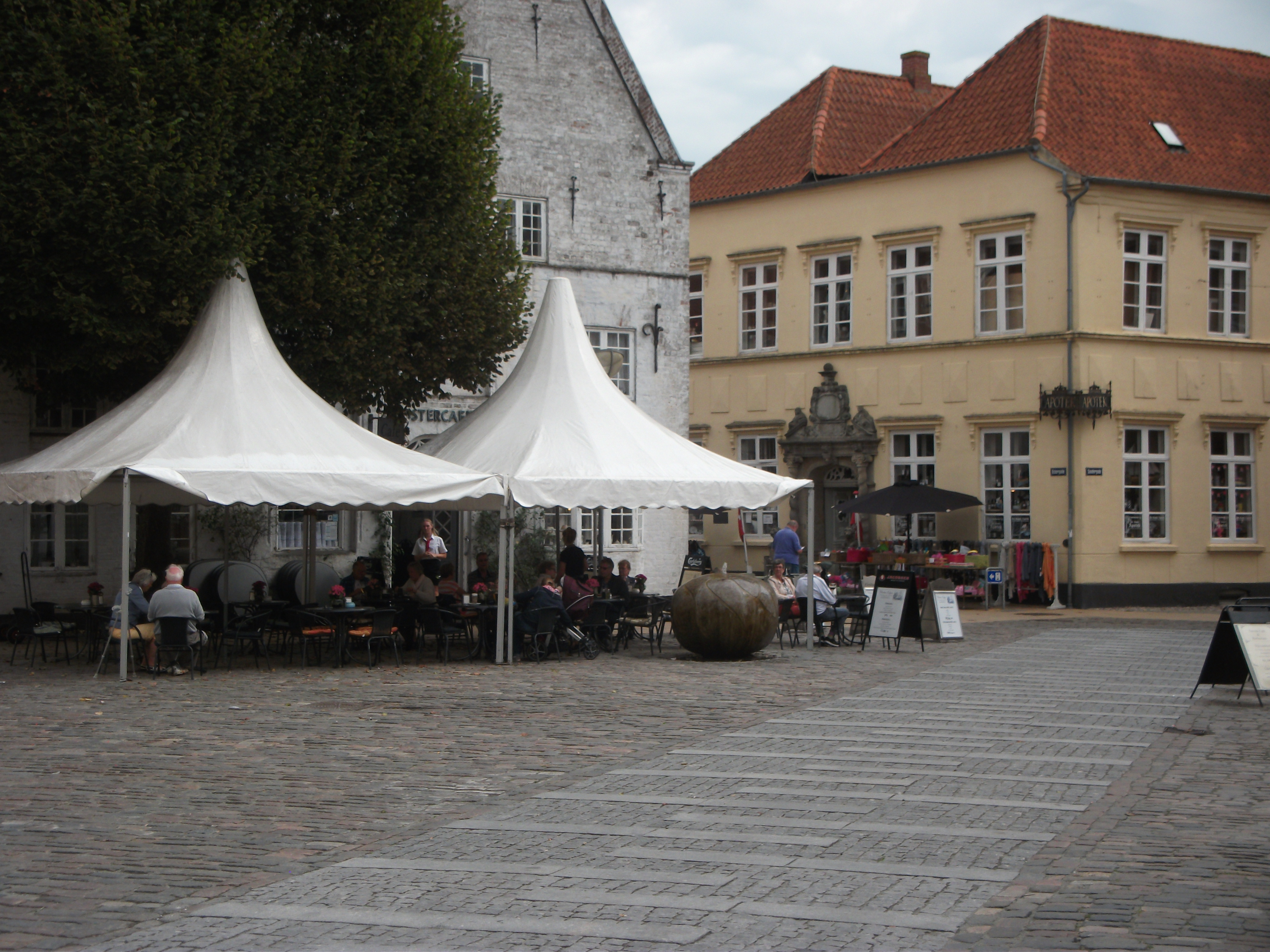
- Market square

- Coat of arms

- Location within Denmark Location within Region of Southern Denmark
- Coordinates: 54°56′34″N 8°51′50″E
- Country: Denmark
- Region: Southern Denmark (Syddanmark)
- Municipality: Tønder

Area
  - Urban: 6.9 km^{2} (2.7 sq mi)

Population (2026)
  - Urban: 7,481
  - Urban density: 1,100/km^{2} (2,800/sq mi)
  - Gender: 3,562 males and 3,919 females
- Time zone: UTC+1 (CET)
  - Summer (DST): UTC+2 (CEST)
- Postal code: DK-6270 Tønder

Tønder (Danish pronunciation: [ˈtsʰønˀɐ]; German: Tondern [ˈtɔndɐn]) is a town in the Region of Southern Denmark. With a population of 7,481 (as of 1 January 2026), it is the main town and the administrative seat of the Tønder Municipality.

== History ==
The first mention of Tønder might have been in the mid-12th century, when the Arab geographer Muhammad al-Idrisi mentioned the landmark Tu(r)ndira, which might have been a reference to either Tønder, or the nearby town of Møgeltønder.

Tønder was granted port privileges by the Hanseatic League in 1243, making it Denmark's oldest privileged market town. In 1532 it was hit by severe floods, with water levels reaching 1.8 m in St Laurent's church. In the 1550s, Tønder's port lost direct access to the sea due to dykes being built to the west of town at the direction of Duke Hans the Elder of Schleswig-Holstein-Haderslev, the son of Frederick I of Denmark.

The town centre is dominated by houses from the late 17th and early 18th century, when the town experienced rapid growth as a result of its lace industry. Prior to 1864, Tønder was situated in the Duchy of Schleswig, so its history is intertwined with the contentious history of Schleswig-Holstein. In the 1920s, when the Schleswig Plebiscite incorporated Northern Schleswig into Denmark, 76.5% of Tønder's inhabitants voted to remain part of Germany and 23.5% voted to join Denmark.

During World War I, a Zeppelin base was operated in Tønder by the Imperial German Navy. The base was attacked by the British on 19 July 1918, in what is known as the Tondern raid. Seven Sopwith Camels from the aircraft carrier HMS Furious bombed the base, hitting two of the three airship hangars. The Zeppelins L.54 and L.60 inside one hangar were destroyed and a balloon inside the other was damaged. After this, Tønder was abandoned as an active airship base, and was used only as an emergency landing site. A wartime aircraft hangar survives, as do some of the ancillary buildings, but only the foundations remain of the large airship hangars. The site now houses a museum, named the Zeppelin and Garrison Museum Tønder.

After the First World War, Tønder was detached from Germany, in spite of the majority of its population casting a pro-German vote in the Schleswig Plebiscites – as Tønder was included in Zone I, which as a whole had a strong pro-Danish majority. In the years that followed, German political parties enjoyed a majority in the city council, and until 1945, the city was officially bilingual.

After the end of the German occupation of Denmark, the political influence of the German population dwindled considerably. In spite of the improvement in cross-border traffic, the location of the town continued to hamper industrial growth through the late 20th century, although some companies did set up businesses. Tourism has grown in importance. In 1989, Tønder Seminarium, the oldest teacher training college in Scandinavia, established in 1788, was closed.

== Attractions ==
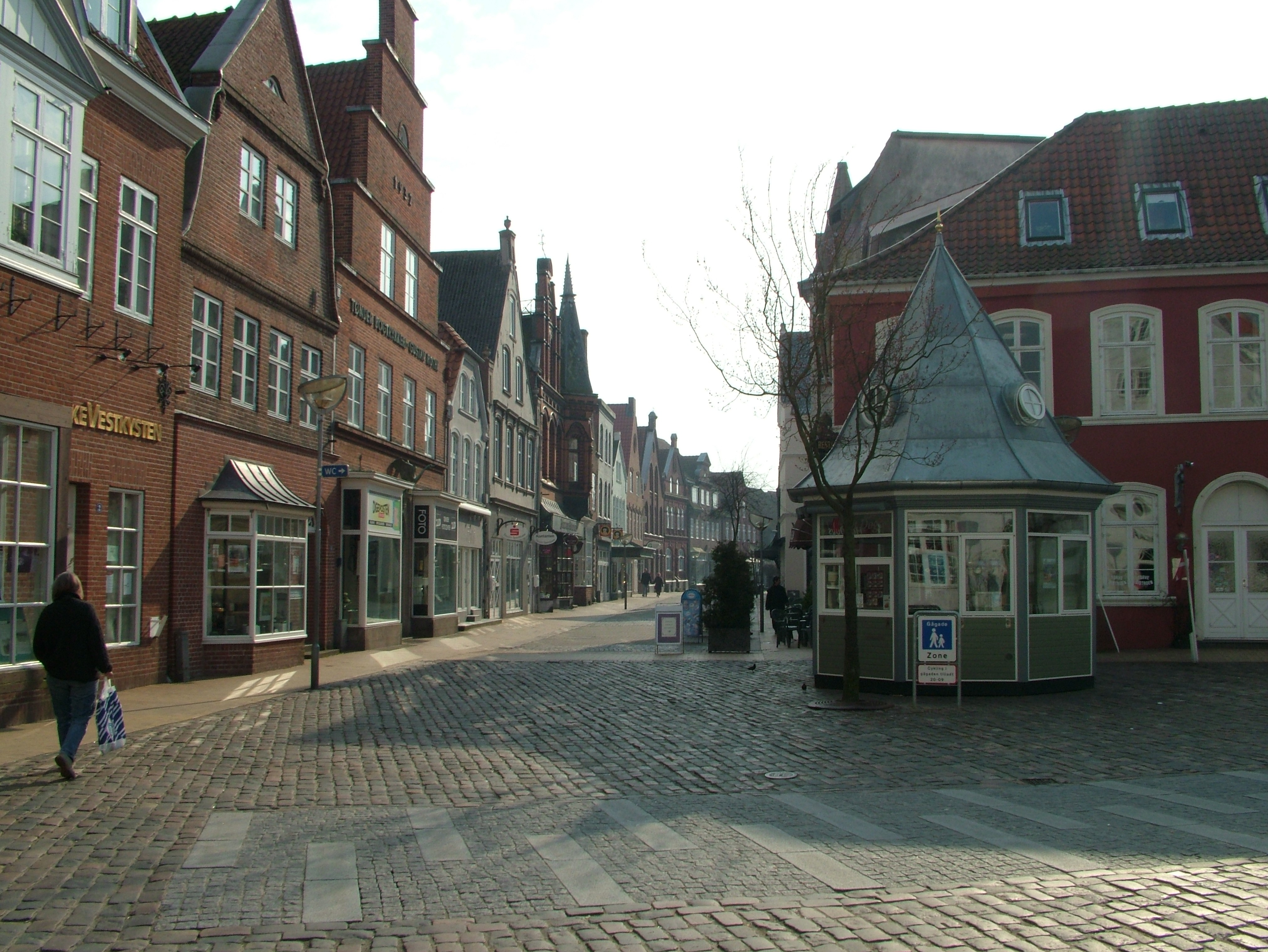
Pedestrian street

Every August, the Tønder Festival offers visitors a wide variety of traditional and modern folk music. The Scouts of Tønder are twinned with Hemyock, in Devon, England, and make exchange trips between the countries every few years.

== Marriage ==
As Tønder is the first town over the border in Denmark from Germany, the town has been a particularly popular place to which to elope since the 1960s. This is especially true for couples of mixed nationalities, particularly between European citizens and non-European citizens. This is due in part to Denmark's liberal marriage laws, compared with those in nearby Germany which requires a minimum of three months' residence and where the ceremony has to be in German. However, in Denmark, the marriage formalities can be completed in around a week, with fewer documents required and the vows may be taken in languages other than Danish. In 2007, over 2,500 marriages were formalised at Tønder town hall by non-resident couples compared with just 150 local couples.

== Transport ==
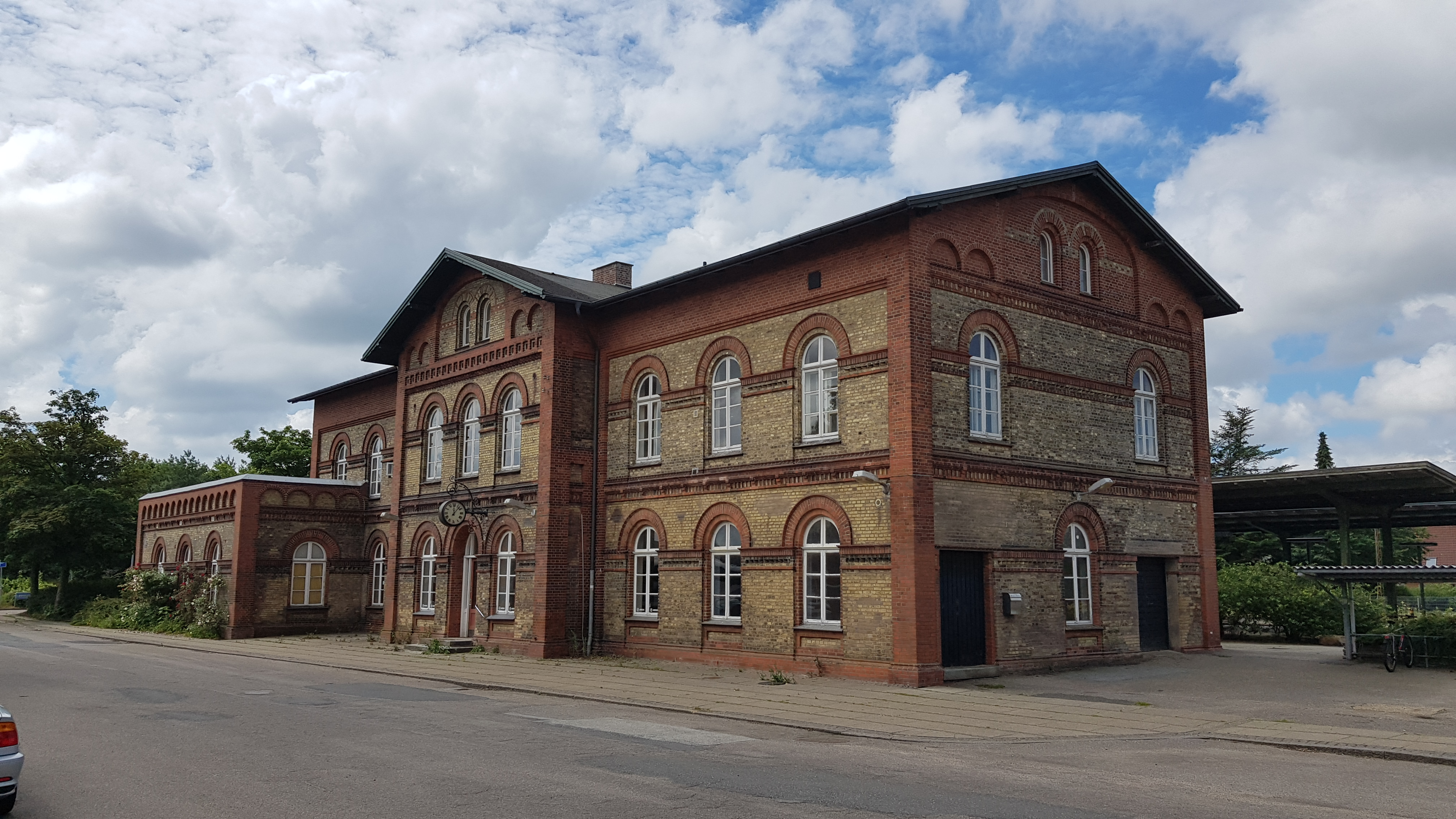
Tønder railway station in 2020.

Tønder is served by Tønder railway station, located on the Bramming–Tønder railway line. The station offers train services to Ribe and Esbjerg in Denmark and Niebüll in Germany. The northern part of the town is also served by the railway halt Tønder Nord. The nearest airport is Sønderborg Airport and the nearest international airport is Esbjerg Airport, but the nearest major international airport is Billund Airport, located about 113 km (70 mi) north of Tønder.

== Notable people from Tønder ==
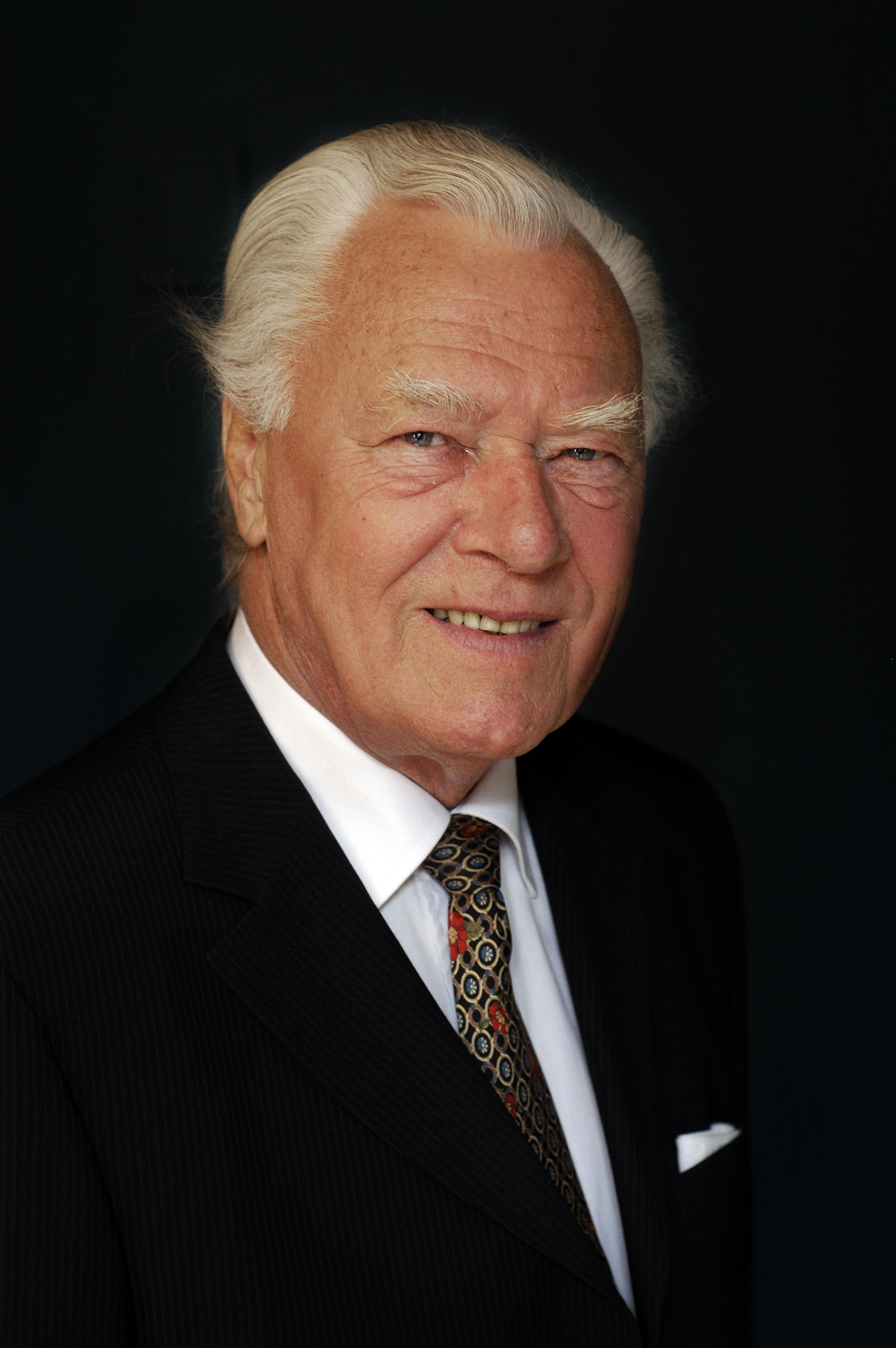
Poul Schlüter, 2005

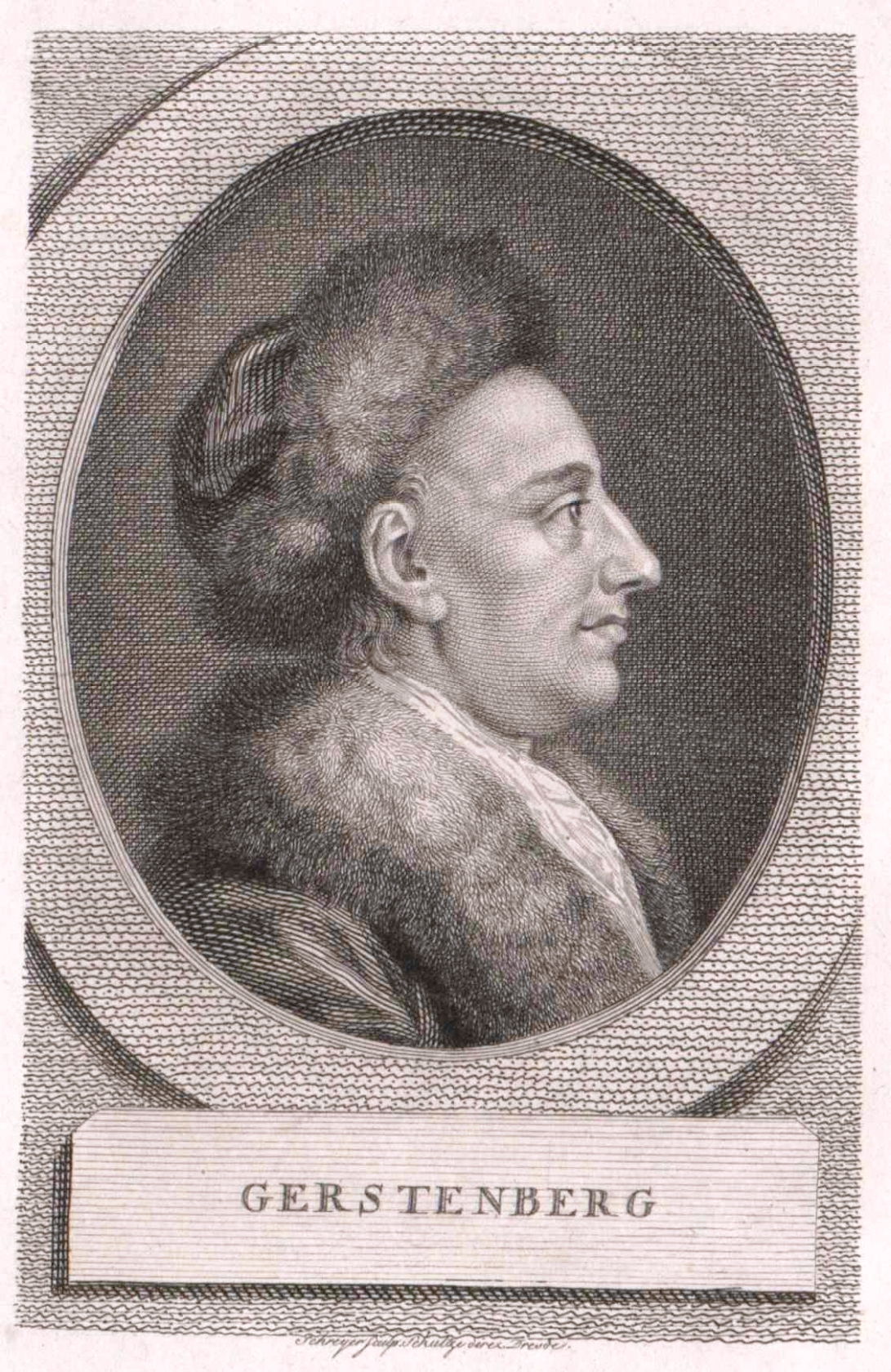
H.W. von Gerstenberg, 1793

=== Public Service, Science & Business ===
- Oluf Gerhard Tychsen (1734–1815) a German Orientalist and Hebrew scholar, a founding father of Islamic numismatics
- Johan Christian Fabricius (1745–1808) a Danish zoologist, specialising in "Insecta", arthropods: insects, arachnids and crustaceans.
- Georg Zoëga (1755 in Daler–1809) a scientist, archaeologist, numismatist and anthropologist
- Nicolai Andresen (1781–1861) a Norwegian merchant, banker and member of Stortinget
- Peter Andreas Hansen (1795 in Tønder–1874) a Danish-born German astronomer
- Julius Bahnsen (1830–1881) a German philosopher, originator of characterology
- Gustav Adolf Neuber (1850–1932) a German surgeon
- Pedro Cristiano Feddersen (1857-1946) a Danish-Brazilian politician settled in the town of Blumenau
- Bernhard M. Jacobsen (1862–1936) emigrated 1876, became a U.S. Representative from Iowa
- Captain Max Valentiner (1883–1949) a German U-boat commander during World War I
- Poul Schlüter (1929–2021) a Danish politician, Prime Minister of Denmark 1982–1993
- Jan Beyer Schmidt-Sørensen (born 1958) a Danish economist and former Director of Business Development at Aarhus Municipality

=== The Arts ===
- Heinrich Wilhelm von Gerstenberg (1737–1823) a German poet and critic.
- Conrad Christian Bøhndel (1779 in Hostrup–1847) a Danish painter and lithographer
- Gretelise Holm (born 1948), journalist, non-fiction and fiction writer
- Hansigne Lorenzen (1870–1952), writer and lace expert
- Siegfried Saloman (1816 in Tønder–1899) a Danish violinist and composer
- Geskel Saloman (1821–1902) a Danish–Swedish portrait and genre painter
- Hans Wegner (1914–2017) Danish furniture designer

=== Sport ===
- Henning Munk Jensen (born 1947) a Danish former association football player, played 392 games for AaB and 62 matches for Denmark 1966–1978, 24 of these as team captain
- Jakob Michelsen (born 1980) head coach of the Denmark women's national football team.

== See also ==
- Concerning the Friary in Tønder
- Tønder case
