= Akademisk Boldklub =

Danish professional football club

AB
- Full name: Akademisk Boldklub Gladsaxe
- Nickname: Akademikerne (The Academics)
- Short name: AB
- Founded: 1889; 137 years ago
- Ground: Gladsaxe Stadium
- Capacity: 13,507 (7,707 seated)
- Chairman: Brian Joseph Grieco
- Manager: Fannar Berg Gunnólfsson
- League: Danish 1st Division
- 2025–26: 2nd Division, 1st of 12
- Website: ab.dk
Home colours	Away colours

Akademisk Boldklub Gladsaxe (AB) is a Danish professional football club from Gladsaxe north of Copenhagen. The club won the 2025–26 Danish 2nd Division and has played in the Danish 1st Division, the second tier of Danish football, since the 2026–27 season, for the first time since 2017. AB was established on 26 February 1889 through a merger of Fredericia Studenternes Kricketklub and Polyteknisk Boldklub, and the same year it was one of the founders of the Danish Football Association.

AB have won the Danish Championship nine times, most recently in 1967, and the Danish Cup once (1999). The club also won the Copenhagen Football Championship eight times before 1901, two of them as shared first place, and the Copenhagen Cup six times, making it one of the most successful clubs in Danish football.

The club has training and club facilities in Bagsværd north of Copenhagen and plays its home matches at Gladsaxe Stadium, also called Stade de Lundberg, named after one of the club's pioneers, Knud Lundberg.

Since the foundation, AB has played in a green and white kit and had an owl as mascot. The club's official fan club is named AB Forever and was founded in 1995.

AB is one of the oldest football clubs in Denmark and is originally from Copenhagen. Here the club had training facilities on Østerbro from 1903 to 1922. From 1924 to the 1960s the club had training facilities on Nørrebro. In the 1960s, AB moved to Gladsaxe, where the club belongs today. Most of the club's titles were won in the time in Copenhagen, especially in the 1890s and the 1940s.

Over the years, the club has developed many football players who have played on the Denmark national team, including Harald Bohr, Karl Aage Hansen, Knud Lundberg, Kresten Bjerre and René Henriksen. Harald Bohr's brother, the Nobel Prize winning physicist Niels Bohr, did not make it to the national team, but indeed played for the club, as a goalkeeper.

== History ==
=== The foundation ===
Akademisk Boldklub was founded on February 26, 1889, through a merger of the two academic sports clubs Fredericia Studenternes Kricketklub and Polyteknisk Boldklub. Fredericia Studenternes Kricketklub was a cricket club founded in 1883 by former pupils of the Latin School in Fredericia. When they became students in 1883, they moved to Copenhagen to study at the University of Copenhagen, and the same year they founded the club so that they could play cricket again.

Like most clubs at the time, Fredericia Studenternes Kricketklub originally played only cricket. Football began to spread in Denmark around 1887, after Frederik Markmann, chairman of Kjøbenhavns Boldklub, had translated the laws of The Football Association into Danish with help from, among others, the club's Holger Forchhammer. The club then took up football and took part in Kjøbenhavns Boldklub's Medal Football Competition the following year.

Holger Forchhammer and his brother Johannes were key people in Fredericia Studenternes Kricketklub at that time. Holger Forchhammer took initiative to start a collaboration with Herlufsholm Kostskole, where Holger's father was the rector, to recruit talented players to the team. Holger also became board member of AB's first board and chairman of the National Olympic Committee and Sports Confederation of Denmark from 1897 to 1899, while Johannes became chairman of the Danish Football Association from 1894 to 1897.

With the introduction of football on the program, the club opened for admission from other schools than Fredericia Studenternes Kricketklub. Eventually, the number of Copenhageners in the club grew larger and the name of the club became unrepresentative of its members. Therefore, members of Fredericia Studenternes Kricketklub and Polyteknisk Boldklub were convened on February 26, 1889, for a joint meeting between the two clubs in order to arrange a merger. Polyteknisk Boldklub was a somewhat younger club from 1885 which consisted of students and graduates from Technical University of Denmark. The result of the meeting was a merger between the two clubs and the foundation of Akademisk Boldklub.

In relation to the merger, new requirements for becoming a member of AB were introduced. The admission requirement was that one had an entrance examination from a Scandinavian university or from the Technical University of Denmark. However, an exemption could be granted for this requirement if the board decided unanimously to register a member or if 15 members of the club recommended a person.

At the establishment of AB, the club got a new logo with an owl as a mascot. The owl is a symbol of wisdom and learning and has been the club's mascot since the foundation. The newly established club played in a green and white kit, as did the Fredericia Studenternes Kricketklub.

=== The early years ===
Shortly after the foundation, on April 1, 1889, AB moved to new premises on Østerbro in Copenhagen where the club during the year grew to have 104 active members and 15 passive members.

On March 5, 1889, AB played its first official football match. The match was played at Blegdamsfælleden in Copenhagen, and AB won 2–0 against the opponent BK Frem.

In 1889, AB participated in the establishment of the Danish Football Association together with 21 football clubs from Copenhagen and five from the province.

AB won the first edition of the Danish Football Association's tournament, the 1889–90 Football Tournament, ahead of Kjøbenhavns Boldklub, which had dominated Danish football until then. In the period 1890–1900, AB won the Copenhagen Football Championship eight times, two of which were shared first places.

On September 14, 1890, AB played in Halmstad against a local club, Halmstads Bollklubb (not to be confused with the present-day Halmstads BK, founded in 1914). The match was long regarded as the first football match on Swedish soil, but it was played under the Swedish rules of the time, a mix of association football and rugby. It is still regarded as the first international football match involving a Swedish team.

Football was not yet played at schools at the time, and In 1894, AB therefore tried to start a junior department with the intention of recruiting talented young players. However, the department had to close again in 1897 due to the bad behavior of its members. In 1899, the club tried again, now led by Edmond Andersen, who went on to run the department for 20 years, and this time it had more success as the department's member count rose to 70 during the first year. The first two members of the new junior department were brothers Niels Bohr and Harald Bohr, who both later came to play on AB's first-team squad. Harald Bohr already debuted at AB's first-team squad at the age of 16, where he became known as the first dribbler in Danish football and was dubbed Lille Bohr by the press. He always played with a white handkerchief in the pocket, which he used to measure the wind direction and strength before and during matches. Harald, who later became a world renowned mathematician, played four international matches with the Denmark national team during his career. Niels Bohr, who later won the Nobel Prize in Physics, played as goalkeeper. According to club lore, he once let a long shot go in during a match against the German side Technikum Mittweida because he was leaning against the post, absorbed in a mathematical problem.

=== Getting a pitch on Østerbro ===
In 1902, AB set up a work committee aimed at making AB a pitch owning club like neighboring club Kjøbenhavns Boldklub and B93 had just become. The committee collected DKK 60,000 for the financing of the facilities, which came primarily from interest free bond loans from supporters of the club. In autumn 1902, the club rented six acres of land at Lammefælleden on Østerbro in Copenhagen by Copenhagen Municipality for the establishment of the new training facilities, which was put into service already in 1903.

Shortly after the establishment of the new training facilities, AB also got a new home ground. Interest in sports was increasing in the early 20th century, and for this reason, the mayor of Copenhagen Jens Jensen in 1906 presented a proposal for the establishment of a sports park, for which DKK 1,264,450 was granted. In 1911, Københavns Idrætspark was completed and the facility became home to the Denmark national team and several Copenhagen football clubs, including AB.

AB's play improved markedly as the club went from the uneven grounds they had played on so far to good fields on the new facilities. The good results AB had achieved so far in the Copenhagen Football Championship, however, did not survive in the period after the move to Østerbro. A highlight in the period after moving to Østerbro was when the team played 2–2 against professional Middlesbrough F.C. from England. In 1912, the poor results reached a new low point when AB ended last in the domestic tournament and had to play a relegation match against Østerbros Boldklub. AB won the relegation match 3–1 and was thus rescued from relegation.

In the 1910s, the results began to improve again, and in 1914, AB participated in its first Copenhagen Cup final, but lost 3–4 to KB. In 1919, the luck eventually turned when AB won its first Danish Championship after defeating B 1901 3–0 in the final. KBU's tournament, which led to the final of the Danish domestic football tournament, was won in a convincing way with 11 wins and only one defeat and a goal score of 46–16. In 1921, AB again won the Danish Championship when AGF was defeated 3–0 by a team consisting of many of the same players who had won the championship two years earlier.

During the years on Østerbro, AB and BK Frem collaborated on arranging so-called "English matches", as KB and B93 had also done, in which professional foreign clubs were invited to a football tournament in Copenhagen. The English matches generated large spectator revenues for the arranging clubs due to the great interest in seeing the professional English teams.

=== Moving to Nørrebro ===
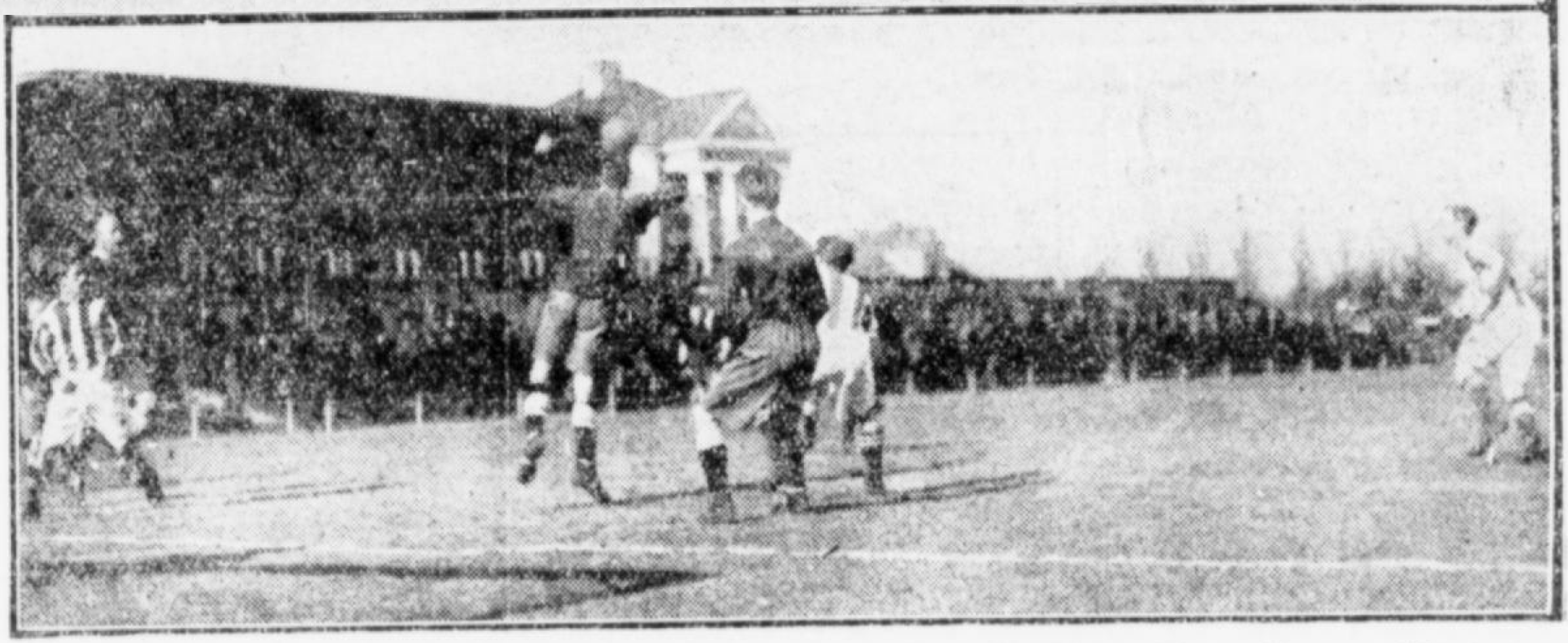
Match between AB and KB on March 18, 1928, in Københavns Idrætspark.

In 1919, the Copenhagen Magistrate terminated the lease of the ground of AB's training facilities as of October 1, 1919. AB therefore suddenly faced being left without a training facility after having had training facilities on Østerbro for 16 years. AB did however negotiate an amendment to the agreement, which meant that the club could use the facility until the ground was taken into service but had to accept a reduction of notice for the termination of the ground to one month. In 1922, the magistrate finally terminated the lease as construction was planned. AB was then again referred to play on uneven fields without any facilities.

With police chief J. Parker as new chairman of AB from 1922, AB managed to find new training facilities in 1923. The Danish state's gymnastics institute was opened at Nørre Allé on Nørrebro in Copenhagen on March 10, 1923. At the institute, training facilities were to be set up, and AB was allowed to manage an area of about 5.5 hectares (10 tønder land). To fund the new facilities, AB set up a funding committee. The committee experienced great support from many well-known people in the academic world, which helped raise awareness about the need for funding. Copenhagen Municipality supported with a loan of DKK 40,000 and AB had itself saved DKK 40,000 through a lending fund. DKK 20,000 was missing, which neighboring club BK Frem lent the club. Work on the new grounds began in June 1923, and on 29 October 1923 the topping-out ceremony was held for the new clubhouse, designed by architect Carl Brummer. The grounds were officially opened in 1924 in the presence of, among others, Copenhagen's mayor Jens Jensen and the Rector of the University of Copenhagen.

On the sports front, AB's football team had mediocre results in the years following the move to Nørrebro, as the team for many years finished in the middle or lower half of the table. In the mid-1930s, the luck began to return to the football team. In 1936, AB was runner-up in the Danish Championship and won its first Copenhagen Cup when KB was defeated 3–1 in the final. The cup championship gave the players a will to get even better, and the team practiced hard over the winter to improve. The practice helped as the club won its third Danish Championship in 1937.

At the end of the 1920s, the number of members in the youth department increased steadily, and AB began to divide the teams by ability. With a strong coach team led by Carl "Skomager" Hansen, the youth department achieved great success in this period and won the juniors tournament in 1928, 1929, 1930, 1932, 1933, 1937 and 1938.

=== Golden era ===
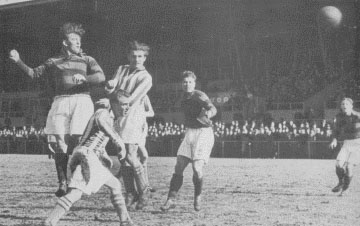
Match between AB and BK Frem around 1940.

In 1939, AB celebrated the club's 50th anniversary at the restaurant Nimb in Copenhagen. At the same time, the club began a period of great success. In 1939, the approach of World War II could be felt in Europe. On the sports front, the war meant that much international sports cooperation was interrupted, but also that interest in sports increased as the offer of leisure activities was limited. Membership in AB increased to over 1,000 during the war period. The attendance to AB's matches was about 30,000 during this period, and in 1944, a total of 43,000 spectators saw AB play the final in the Danish Championships against BK Frem.

During the 1940s, a new generation of talented players such as Knud Bastrup-Birk, Georg Dahlfeldt and Karl Aage Hansen were raised, which helped ensure AB great success in the following years. The team already had a strong base of established players, consisting of among others Eyolf Kleven and Knud Lundberg who were in the national team in three sports (football, handball and basketball). With the former AB player Arne Kleven as coach, AB won several Copenhagen Cup finals and Danish Championships in the 1940s. The club won the Danish Championship in 1943, 1945 and 1947, silver medals in 1942, 1944 and 1949, and bronze medals in 1946 and 1948. AB won the Copenhagen Cup in 1942, 1944, 1945 and 1949 and were runners-up in 1946. At the Olympic Games in London in 1948 where the Denmark national team won bronze, AB had six players in the squad: Karl Aage Hansen, Knud Bastrup-Birk, Knud Lundberg, Poul Petersen, Ivan Jensen and Holger Seebach. In December 1948, AB's first-team squad went on a training trip to Barcelona in Spain and Algiers in Algeria where the team played two matches against FC Barcelona each of which was attended by around 40,000 spectators. The first match ended 1–1, while the second match was lost 1–2.

AB's success continued into the 1950s where a new generation of players ensured that AB finished in the top four every year between 1950 and 1957. The club became Danish Champions in 1951 and 1952, and the Copenhagen Cup was won in 1950, while the club lost the Copenhagen Cup final in 1953 and the Danish Cup final in 1956. In 1960, Knud Lundberg ended his career at the age of 40 after 340 matches for AB's first-team squad. AB was relegated to the second tier for the first time ever in 1960 but got promoted back to the first tier the following year.

=== Moving out to Gladsaxe ===
In 1958 the Danish Ministry of Education terminated the lease of the ground of AB's training facilities. This happened despite the fact that the ministry had previously stated that AB did not have to fear a resignation. In spite of protests from AB's board of directors and the fact that AB through the club's contribution to student sport throughout the previous 70 years had exempted the university from carrying out this task, the Ministry chose to terminate the lease for the entire area as of April 1, 1962. The ministry could not relocate AB to another area in Copenhagen.

The club was allowed to use the facilities for a period of time despite the termination of the lease, but the prospect of being left without training facilities pushed the club to negotiate a move of the club with municipalities in Copenhagen's suburbs. Gladsaxe Municipality met the club with both goodwill and realism and thus became AB's new base. The move to Gladsaxe was helped by the mayor of the city Erhard Jakobsen who wanted to make Gladsaxe a pioneer municipality, which involved getting an elite sports club to the municipality. At the same time, there was a great deal of support for the move from the municipal council, the sports committee, the engineers of the municipality and Bagsværd Idrætsforening, which offered to join an association with AB.

After resistance among both the members of AB and Bagsværd Idrætsforening, the two clubs held a founding general assembly on January 17, 1962, where the association became a reality. For AB, the association and relocation involved a union change from DBU Copenhagen to DBU Zealand. At the same time, the association meant that university affiliation was no longer required to become a member of the club. The association with Bagsværd Idrætsforening also meant that AB got handball on the program so that the club offered four sports – football, cricket, tennis and handball.

When the negotiations about moving AB to Gladsaxe finally went through, the construction of new training facilities began in Bagsværd. The facilities included eight football pitches and an indoor hall, which was the largest in Northern Europe at the time. The facilities were inaugurated in the autumn of 1963, and the indoor hall was completed in 1966. AB's relocation from Nørrebro to Gladsaxe was thereby a reality. From then on, AB had training facilities at Skovbrynet in Bagsværd and the first-team squad's home matches were played on Gladsaxe Stadium.

The relocation to Gladsaxe quickly came to create challenges for AB. On the social level, a new community had to be built. Economically, AB became indebted due to the high costs of establishing the new training facilities as well as falling revenues due to low attendance rates at home matches and a slowdown in member-uptake.

On the sports front, the relocation to Gladsaxe offered both ups and downs. AB's youth team won the Danish Championship in 1963 for the first time in the club's history. A large part of the team later went on to play on the club's first-team squad, which won AB's latest Danish Championship in 1967 under the leadership of Mario Astorri. The team played technical and forward-playing football, which they had learnt in their youth years in AB. In 1970, AB was one goal short of winning the club's 10th Danish Championship.

In the late 1960s and early 1970s, AB participated in European football in the European Cup, the Inter-Cities Fairs Cup and the UEFA Cup. In 1968, AB achieved its best results in European football in the history of the club when the team qualified for the 2nd round of the European Cup after having defeated the Swiss football club FC Zürich 4–3 overall in the tournament's 1st round. The opponent in the 2nd round was Greek AEK Athens. AB lost 0–2 overall after having played 0–0 away in the first match. The home match was interrupted by protesters who ran on the field to demonstrate against the military junta in Greece.

In the following years, AB experienced a prolonged downturn. From 1974 to 1985, AB was stuck in the second tier, and in 1985 AB was relegated even further to the third tier of Danish football for the first time ever in the history of the club. The decision to introduce professional football in Denmark in 1978 became tough for AB, as the club struggled to adapt to the new reality.

=== Success in the 1990s ===
In the early 1990s, AB again experienced success as a team of talented players who had been in AB for many years, helped promote AB to the best Danish league. These players remained in AB even though they had offers from many other clubs. Among these players were René Henriksen who later became the Denmark national team's captain, Peter Rasmussen who holds the club record of 394 appearances and later became the club's CEO, and Peter Frandsen who played 392 matches for AB and later became coach for the first-team squad. This team of strong AB players helped promote AB to the second tier in 1993 under the leadership of former Danish champion with AB Johnny Petersen. The team ended as number three in 2nd division East, thus qualifying for two playoff matches against Nørresundby Boldklub. The matches ended 3–3 away and 2–2 at home, so AB were promoted on away goals – the club's first promotion since 1972.

In 1995, AB reached the Danish Cup final after knocking out Brøndby IF in the quarter-finals, but lost the final 0–5 to F.C. Copenhagen. In 1996, Tonni Nielsen was appointed head coach, and the same year AB were promoted to the Danish Superliga after finishing second in the 1st Division – three years after promotion to the second tier. AB was thus back in the top flight for the first time since 1973. In 1997, Christian Andersen became the new head coach. Christian Andersen represented forward-playing and technically based football, which AB became known for in the late 1990s. The success of the team culminated in 1999 when AB ended on a third place in the league and became Danish Cup Champions after having won 2–1 against AaB.

In 2000, AB won bronze medals again, and in 2001, AB participated in the cup final but lost to Silkeborg IF. At the end of the 1990s, AB had a team consisting of many young talented players, many of whom won the Danish Football Association's talent prize. Peter Løvenkrands won in 1998, Martin Albrechtsen won in 2000 and Stephan Andersen won in 2003.

After a few years of mediocre results, AB was relegated to the second tier in 2004.

=== Economic crisis ===
Between 1997 and 2004, AB went from a private limited company to a listed company and then out of the top flight. The club raised DKK 93 million when it was listed on the stock exchange in 1998, but losses in the following years – DKK 36.4 million in 2000/01, DKK 21.5 million in 2001/02 and DKK 15.9 million in 2002/03 – forced it to sell its best players, and in 2004 AB were relegated from the Superliga.

AB's upturn in the 1990's was started by talented players who helped AB advance through the divisions, but the sustained success was also sparked by the transformation of AB from an amateur association into a professional football business. This process was initiated by the three new board members Bent Jakobsen, Denis Jørgen Flemming Holmark and Torben Mærsk who in short time raised large capital sums through a stock exchange introduction of the club.

In the 1997/98 season, the board introduced full-time professionalism in AB, and great efforts were made to achieve success in the league with the appointment of Christian Andersen as head coach and with the purchase of several profiles. The board wanted to make AB a power factor in Danish football again through a business plan based on buying and selling players, sporting success, TV revenues, entrance fees, merchandise sales and talent development.

On November 24, 1997, AB was transformed from a private limited company to a limited company, and the share capital was also expanded to DKK 36,700,000. The money was invested in significant upgrades of the team, staff and facilities. At the same time, a drastic expansion of Gladsaxe Stadium, which was intended to create a foundation for a modern football business, was initiated.

In 1998, the new board members pushed the CEO for six years, Henrik Mostrup, out of the management and instead appointed the former AB profile Per Frimann as new CEO. Shortly after – in November 1998 – AB was introduced on Copenhagen Stock Exchange where the club raised DKK 93,000,000 at a share price of 115. In the following years, large sums were invested in new players. At the same time, many profiles were sold to balance the accounts. However, the transfer spending proved too high relative to the club's income. Despite the large equity from the IPO in 1998 and several large million sales to international top clubs, the annual accounts nevertheless showed large losses, especially in the early years of the 2000s. In the 2000/2001 annual account, the deficit was DKK 36,392,000. The same year, measures to reduce operating expenses were therefore initiated. At the same time, rumors came up about possible bankruptcy and a merger with FCK, but this was however rejected. In 2001, Per Frimann resigned as CEO of AB and moved to a role as sports director. In 2002, the deficit was still high at DKK 21,472,000. Per Frimann chose to resign as sports director on April 19, 2002.

Despite further efforts to balance the economy, AB continued to have a major deficit of DKK 15,941,000 in 2003. During this period, the chairman of the board Mogens Trygve Lied Flagstad and vice-chairman of the board Allan Kim Pedersen initiated an investigation of the possibilities of a merger with Farum Boldklub to improve the club's future economic basis. However, both left the board after the amateur club's main board had informed the professional club's board and the public that it was critical of the investigation.

In the following years, the company was downsized, which was necessary after the heavy spending of the previous years. The downsizing meant, however, that the club had to sell the last profiles such as Nicolai Stokholm, Rasmus Daugaard, Mohamed Zidan and Stephan Andersen. As a consequence, the results got worse and in 2004, AB was relegated to the second tier.

=== Vision 2010 and the 1st Division years (2004–2017) ===
While again playing in the Danish 1st Division, AB launched Vision 2010 with the goal of returning to the best Danish league by 2010. At that time AB had a talented team of many players from the club's academy, which in 2008 had won the Danish Championship for youth players. The vision was close to be realized with a third place in 2009 and a fourth place in 2010, but it failed and left AB again in financial problems. In June 2012, AB was rescued from bankruptcy by a majority in Gladsaxe Municipality Council. In December 2013, the State Administration found that the municipality's purchase of fixtures and equipment from AB A/S for DKK 2 million amounted to unlawful aid, as its purpose had been to relieve the company's liquidity problems and avoid bankruptcy. In 2014 the municipality disputed the finding, arguing that the items had been valued by independent experts and that the purchase had been made on ordinary market terms.

In subsequent years, AB experienced poorer results, and for three consecutive years – from 2012 to 2014 – the club's place in the second tier was saved in the final round of the tournament. In 2012, AB was rescued from relegation by defeating Hobro IK 3–1 away. In 2013 the club saved its existence by defeating Lyngby Boldklub 4–2. In 2014, the rescue was secured by playing 3–3 with HB Køge. In 2015, AB were finally relegated and moved down to the third tier for the first time since 1993.

The 2015-16 season was a successful one for the club as it bounced back from relegation to win promotion back to the Danish 1st Division at the first time of asking under manager Per Frandsen. Despite this, however, the beginning of the season proved challenging with the club suffering a heavy defeat in the first round of the Danish Cup at the hands of rivals Lyngby Boldklub and only finishing third in its group behind Hvidovre IF and Hellerup IK to progress to the Spring promotion group.

Concerns remained after a 1–0 defeat to Aarhus Fremad in the opening game of the Spring promotion round, although they quickly dissipated over the following months as AB won the Danish 2nd Division title with promotion finally confirmed after a 2–1 win over Aarhus Fremad.

The season concluded after 6–4 home victory over second placed Fremad Amager. After the final whistle, AB received the Danish 2nd Division trophy. The match was also the last appearance for a number of players, including Simon Bræmer.

The next season, AB could not sustain the success and ended last in 1st Division, thus relegating back to 2nd Division.

=== In the 2nd Division (2017–2022) ===
After relegation in 2017, AB spent nine consecutive seasons in the 2nd Division.

=== Five Castles and promotion (2022–2026) ===
In November 2022, AB was sold to the American investor group Five Castles Football Group LLC. The consortium consists of 59 individual investors, most of whom are New York City-based and each contributed between $10,000 to $30,000.

According to the club, Five Castles was led by, among others, Erik Stover, formerly of the New York Red Bulls, and Jen Hsiang Chang, formerly of the New York Cosmos. Stover became CEO of AB, and Chang became chairman and sporting director. The new owners set out to grow commercial revenue, modernize scouting and player recruitment, and give the team a clear playing identity.

Patrick Birch Braune was head coach at the time of the takeover. For the 2023–24 season, AB appointed the Swede David Roufpanah. The team finished fifth and reached the quarter-finals of the Danish Cup for the first time in 22 years. In November 2023, Sofie Brandi Petersen succeeded Stover as CEO, and in August 2024 Brian Joseph Grieco took over as chairman so that Chang could concentrate on the sporting side.

In May 2024, Jóhannes Karl Guðjónsson became head coach. He was assistant coach of the Iceland national football team and had played for clubs including Aston Villa, Wolverhampton Wanderers and Burnley. AB finished fourth in 2024–25. In April 2025, Green Owls Football Holdings became a minority shareholder with between a quarter and a third of the shares, while Five Castles remained the majority owner.

In 2025–26, AB led the division at the winter break after winning eight of their last nine matches. In November 2025, Guðjónsson announced that he would leave after the autumn matches for family reasons, and his assistant, the Icelander Fannar Berg Gunnólfsson, was named head coach. Promotion was secured on 13 May 2026 with four rounds to spare: AB lost 1–2 to FC Roskilde that evening, but Hellerup IK beat Næstved, leaving AB out of reach. A 5–0 win over Hellerup IK in round 30 also secured the division title. AB thereby returned to the Danish 1st Division for the first time since 2017.

=== Return to the 1st Division (2026–) ===
In June 2026, head coach Fannar Berg Gunnólfsson's contract was extended until June 2029. On 30 June 2026, Sofie Brandi Petersen stepped down as CEO, and Henrik Skjoldager Bom, who had joined the club as President in January that year, took over the day-to-day management. Ahead of the 2026–27 season, the club introduced an AB1889 wordmark alongside its traditional crest. In the Danish Cup, AB beat Holbæk B&I 2–1, Brønshøj Boldklub 4–2 and Superliga side Sønderjyske 3–1, before losing 1–2 to Brøndby IF in the fourth round in front of 10,754 spectators, a new record for Gladsaxe Stadium.

== Stadium ==
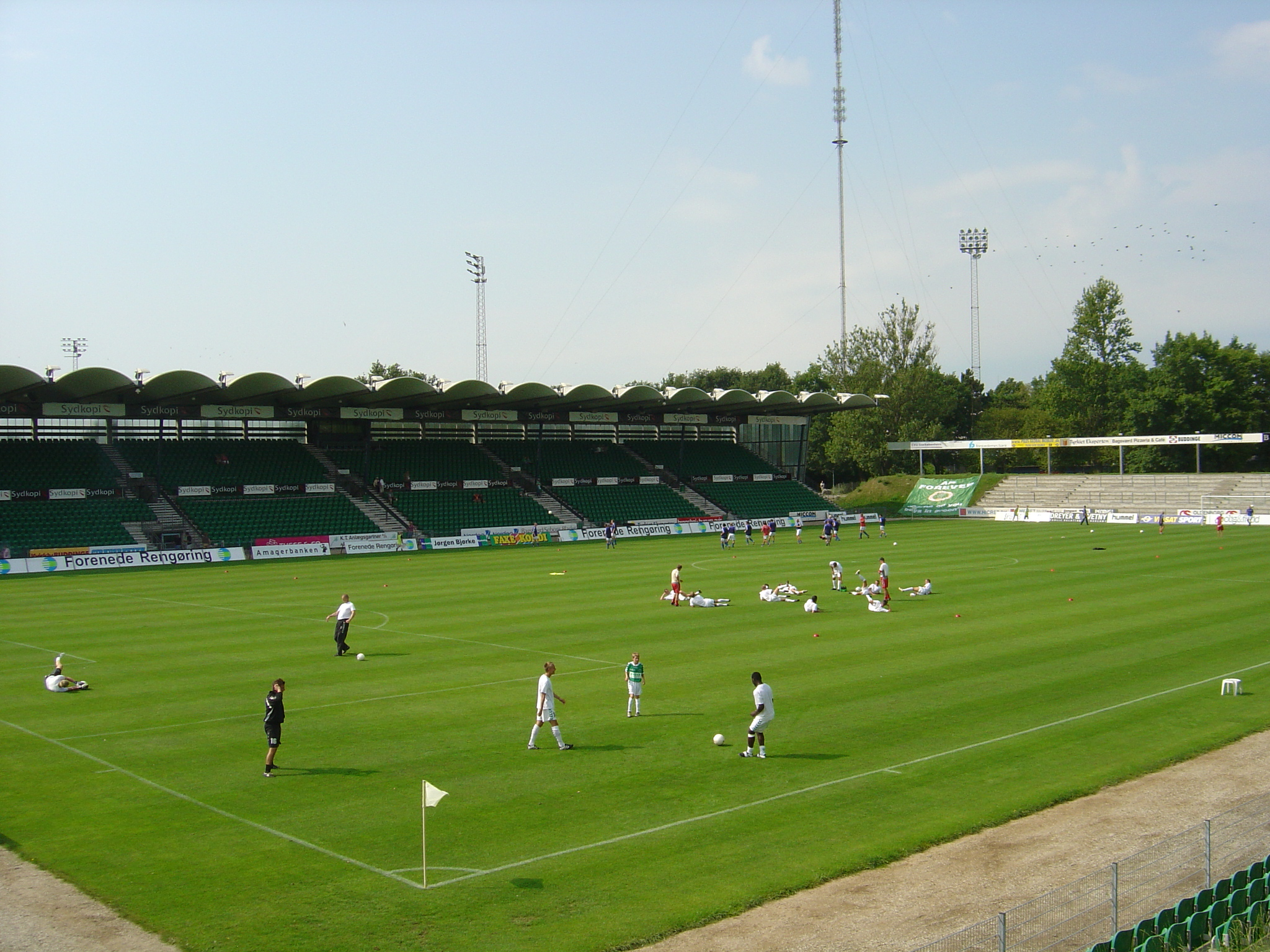
Gladsaxe Stadium where AB plays their home matches.

AB plays their home matches at Gladsaxe Stadium (Danish: Gladsaxe Stadion). The stadium is located at Gladsaxevej 200, Søborg, Gladsaxe Municipality, in Copenhagen, and is primarily used for football matches. The stadium has a capacity of 13,507, of which 7,707 are covered seats. The pitch measures 105 × 68 meters, and the lighting is 700 lux.

The construction of the stadium was started in 1938, and the stadium was inaugurated on May 26, 1940, under the name Gladsaxe Idrætspark Marielyst. The stadium was expanded and renovated beginning on November 16, 1998. This renewal of the stadium included constructing a new long side with both upper and lower grandstand, a sponsor lounge and two end stands with only standing room without a roof. At the same time, the running track around the pitch was removed. The stadium was subsequently inaugurated under its new name, Gladsaxe Stadium, on September 12, 1999. The stand opposite the new one dates from the 1960s. Gladsaxe Stadium is also called Stade de Lundberg, named after one of the club's pioneers, Knud Lundberg.

The stadium spectator record was set on 27 October 2026, when 10,754 spectators watched AB lose 1–2 to Brøndby IF in the fourth round of the Danish Cup. The previous record of 10,039 was set on April 18, 2004, in the Superliga match between AB and FC Copenhagen.

== Colours and crest ==
AB have played in green and white since the club was founded, colours taken over from Fredericia Studenternes Kricketklub. The club's symbol is an owl, representing wisdom and learning and referring to the club's academic roots. The club's current visual identity uses the name AB 1889, with green and gold as its primary colours.

== Honours ==
- Danish Champions:
  - Winners (9): 1919, 1921, 1937, 1943, 1945, 1947, 1951, 1952, 1967
  - Silver (10): 1917, 1932, 1936, 1942, 1944, 1949, 1950, 1955, 1957, 1970
  - Bronze (8): 1929, 1939, 1946, 1948, 1954, 1956, 1999, 2000
- Danish Cup:
  - Winners (1): 1998–99
  - Runners-up (3): 1955–56, 1994–95, 2000–01
- Danish Super Cup:
  - Winners (1): 1999
- Copenhagen Champions:
  - Winners (8, two shared): 1890, 1892 (shared), 1893, 1894, 1895, 1896, 1899, 1900 (shared)
  - Silver (5): 1891, 1897, 1898, 1901, 1908
  - Bronze (3): 1904, 1905, 1907
- Copenhagen Cup:
  - Winners (6): 1936, 1942, 1944, 1945, 1949, 1950
  - Runners-up (6): 1914, 1915, 1925, 1931, 1946, 1953
- 51 seasons in the Highest Danish League
- 29 seasons in the Second Highest Danish League
- 11 seasons in the Third Highest Danish League

== Results ==
The table below is an overview of AB's seasons in the Danish domestic football tournament since it was established in 1927.

AB's league position by season
Season	Division	Level	Position	Note
2026–27	1. division	2nd tier	ongoing	
2025–26	2. division, oprykningsspil	3rd tier	1	↑ Promotion
2024–25	2. division, oprykningsspil	3rd tier	4	
2023–24	2. division, oprykningsspil	3rd tier	5	
2022–23	2. division, oprykningsspil	3rd tier	5	
2021–22	2. division, oprykningsspil	3rd tier	5	
2020–21	2. division, group 2	3rd tier	3	
2019–20	2. division, oprykningsspil	3rd tier	7	
2018–19	2. division, oprykningsspil	3rd tier	5	
2017–18	2. division, nedrykningsspil	3rd tier	2	
2016–17	1. division	2nd tier	12	↓ Relegation
2015–16	2. division, oprykningsspil	3rd tier	1	↑ Promotion
2014–15	1. division	2nd tier	11	↓ Relegation
2013–14	1. division	2nd tier	10	
2012–13	1. division	2nd tier	10	
2011–12	1. division	2nd tier	11	
2010–11	1. division	2nd tier	9	
2009–10	1. division	2nd tier	4	
2008–09	1. division	2nd tier	3	
2007–08	1. division	2nd tier	6	
2006–07	1. division	2nd tier	10	
2005–06	1. division	2nd tier	12	
2004–05	1. division	2nd tier	11	
2003–04	Superligaen	1st tier	12	↓ Relegation
2002–03	Superligaen	1st tier	9	
2001–02	Superligaen	1st tier	5	
2000–01	Superligaen	1st tier	10	
1999–2000	Superligaen	1st tier	3	Bronze
1998–99	Superligaen	1st tier	3	Bronze
1997–98	Superligaen	1st tier	5	
1996–97	Superligaen	1st tier	10	
1995–96	1. division	2nd tier	2	↑ Promotion
1994–95	1. division, kvalifikationsligaen	2nd tier	7	
1993–94	1. division	2nd tier	6	
1992–93	2. division	3rd tier	3	↑ Promotion
1991–92	2. division vest, slutspil (Note: AB belonged to the eastern group geographically but was placed in the western group in spring 1992. There was no promotion or relegation that spring; the final position gave starting points for autumn 1992.)	3rd tier	2	
1991–92	2. division øst, grundspil	3rd tier	5	
1991	2. division øst	3rd tier	3	
1990	3. division øst	3rd tier	2	
1989	3. division øst	3rd tier	5	
1988	3. division øst	3rd tier	12	
1987	3. division øst	3rd tier	7	
1986	3. division øst	3rd tier	3	
1985	2. division	2nd tier	13	↓ Relegation
1984	2. division	2nd tier	4	
1983	2. division	2nd tier	6	
1982	2. division	2nd tier	5	
1981	2. division	2nd tier	8	
1980	2. division	2nd tier	5	
1979	2. division	2nd tier	4	
1978	2. division	2nd tier	10	
1977	2. division	2nd tier	13	
1976	2. division	2nd tier	9	
1975	2. division	2nd tier	10	
1974	2. division	2nd tier	6	
1973	1. division	1st tier	11	↓ Relegation
1972	2. division	2nd tier	1	↑ Promotion
1971	1. division	1st tier	12	↓ Relegation
1970	1. division	1st tier	2	Silver
1969	1. division	1st tier	6	
1968	1. division	1st tier	9	
1967	1. division	1st tier	1	Gold
1966	1. division	1st tier	6	
1965	2. division	2nd tier	1	↑ Promotion
1964	1. division	1st tier	11	↓ Relegation
1963	1. division	1st tier	9	
1962	1. division	1st tier	7	
1961	2. division	2nd tier	2	↑ Promotion
1960	1. division	1st tier	11	↓ Relegation
1959	1. division	1st tier	7	
1958	1. division	1st tier	8	
1956–57	1. division	1st tier	2	Silver
1955–56	1. division	1st tier	3	Bronze
1954–55	1. division	1st tier	2	Silver
1953–54	1. division	1st tier	3	Bronze
1952–53	1. division	1st tier	4	
1951–52	1. division	1st tier	1	Gold
1950–51	1. division	1st tier	1	Gold
1949–50	1. division	1st tier	2	Silver
1948–49	1. division	1st tier	2	Silver
1947–48	1. division	1st tier	3	Bronze
1946–47	1. division	1st tier	1	Gold
1945–46	1. division	1st tier	3	Bronze
1944–45	Kreds III, slutrunden	1st tier	1	Gold
1943–44	Kreds III, slutrunden	1st tier	2	Silver
1942–43	Kreds III, slutrunden	1st tier	1	Gold
1941–42	Kreds III, slutrunden	1st tier	2	Silver
1940–41	Kreds III	1st tier	7	
1939–40	Mesterskabsserien	1st tier	8	
1938–39	Mesterskabsserien	1st tier	3	Bronze
1937–38	Mesterskabsserien	1st tier	5	
1936–37	Mesterskabsserien	1st tier	1	Gold
1935–36	Mesterskabsserien	1st tier	2	Silver
1934–35	Mesterskabsserien	1st tier	4	
1933–34	Mesterskabsserien	1st tier	5	
1932–33	Mesterskabsserien	1st tier	6	
1931–32	Mesterskabsserien	1st tier	2	Silver
1930–31	Mesterskabsserien	1st tier	4	
1929–30	Mesterskabsserien	1st tier	5	
1928–29	Slutrunden	1st tier	3	Bronze
1927–28	2. kreds	1st tier	4	

Table last updated: 22 November 2026.

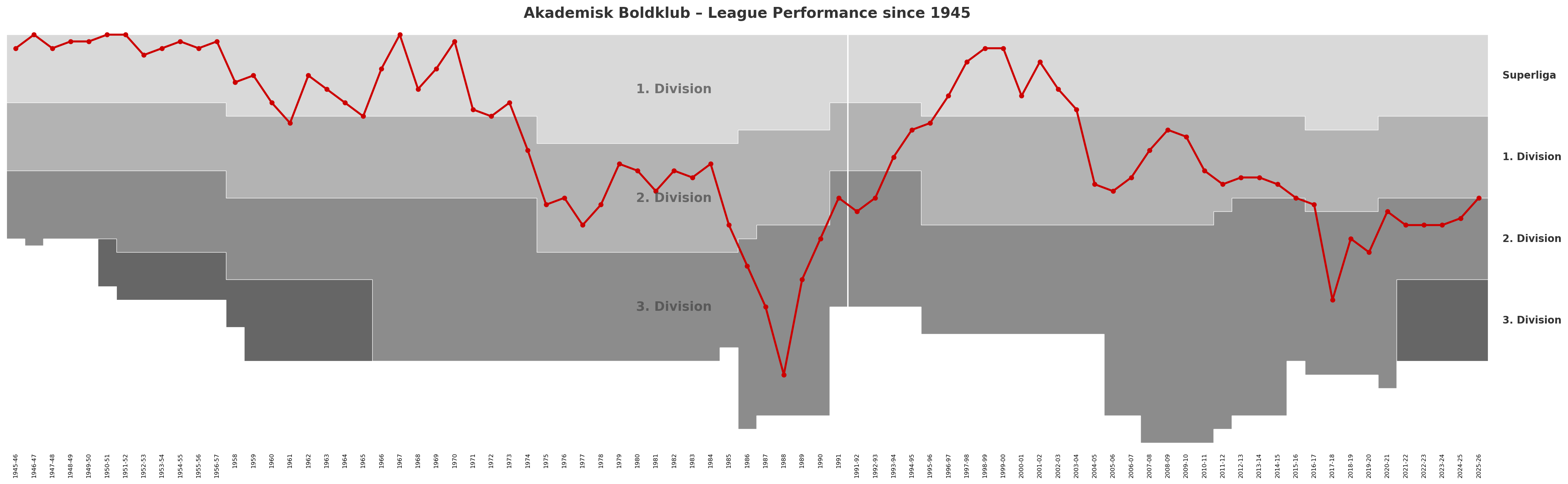
AB's league position since 1945

== International appearances ==
UEFA Champions League / European Champion Clubs' Cup
Season	Round	Opponent	Nation	Home	Away	W	D	L	Goals	Ref.
1968–1969	1.	FC Zürich	(Switzerland)	1-2	3-1	1	0	1	4-3	
1968–1969	2.	AEK Athens F.C.	(Greece)	0-2	0-0	0	1	1	0-2	
Total	-			1-4	3-1	1	1	2	4-5	-

UEFA Europa League / UEFA Cup
Season	Round	Opponent	Nation	Home	Away	W	D	L	Goals	Ref.
1971–1972	1.	Dundee F.C.	(Scotland)	0-1	2-4	0	0	2	2-5	
1999–2000	1.	Grasshopper Club Zürich	(Switzerland)	0-2	1-1	0	1	1	1-3	
2000–2001	Qual.	B36 Tórshavn	(Faroe Islands)	8-0	1-0	2	0	0	9-0	
2000–2001	1.	SK Slavia Prague	(Czech Republic)	0-2	0-3	0	0	2	0-5	
Total	-			8-5	4-8	2	1	5	12-13	-

Inter-Cities Fairs Cup
Season	Round	Opponent	Nation	Home	Away	W	D	L	Goals	Ref.
1970–1971	1.	Sliema Wanderers	(Malta)	7-0	3-2	2	0	0	10-2	
1970–1971	2.	RSC Anderlecht	(Belgium)	1-3	0-4	0	0	2	1-7	
Total	-			8-3	3-6	2	0	2	11-9	-

UEFA Intertoto Cup
Season	Round	Opponent	Nation	Home	Away	W	D	L	Goals	Ref.
1968	Group Stage	Wacker Innsbruck	(Austria)	0-2	1-0	1	0	1	1-2	
1968	Group Stage	FC Lausanne-Sport	(Switzerland)	0-1	2-2	0	1	1	2-3	
1968	Group Stage	Eintracht Braunschweig	(Germany)	0-0	0-2	0	1	1	0-2	
1971	Group Stage	Hertha BSC	(Germany)	0-4	1-3	0	0	2	1-7	
1971	Group Stage	FC Zürich	(Switzerland)	1-2	1-4	0	0	2	2-6	
1971	Group Stage	FK AS Trenčín	(Czechoslovakia)	0-4	1-3	0	0	2	1-7	
1998	2.	FC Vorskla Poltava	(Ukraine)	2-2	1-1	0	2	0	3-3 (a)	
2002	1.	BATE Borisov	(Belarus)	0-2	0-1	0	0	2	0-3	
Total	-			6-18	4-15	1	4	11	10-33	-

Table last updated: 17 November 2026.

== Players ==
As of 16 November 2026

Note: Flags indicate national team as defined under FIFA eligibility rules; some limited exceptions apply. Players may hold more than one non-FIFA nationality.

No.	Pos.	Nation	Player
1	GK	DEN	Marcus Bobjerg
3	DF	USA	Travian Sousa
4	DF	GER	Adrien Koudelka
5	DF	DEN	Marc Dal Hende
7	FW	DEN	Noah Engell
10	FW	DEN	Marco Ramkilde
11	FW	DEN	Casper Grening
14	DF	BRA	Gabriel Noga
15	MF	DEN	Søren Ilsøe
17	DF	DEN	Marius Stenner
18	FW	DEN	Milan Silva Rasmussen
19	FW	DEN	Jonathan Mathys
20	FW	DEN	Marcus Immersen
21	MF	DEN	Mikkel Clement

No.	Pos.	Nation	Player
22	MF	DEN	Marco Vesterholm
23	DF	DEN	Tobias Damtoft
24	DF	USA	Aidan Liu
25	GK	USA	Michael Stone
28	MF	DEN	Tobias Lykkebak
29	FW	SEN	Saliou Diop
30	MF	DEN	Alfred Horup
33	DF	DEN	William Warrer
34	DF	DEN	Mikkel Brund
37	DF	DEN	Frederik Lindgaard
41	FW	DEN	Tobias Hageltorn
54	GK	ISL	Adam Ingi Benediktsson
77	FW	SUR	Jermain Fernandes
88	FW	CAN	O'Vonte Mullings

=== Youth players in use 2025-26 ===
Note: Flags indicate national team as defined under FIFA eligibility rules; some limited exceptions apply. Players may hold more than one non-FIFA nationality.

No.	Pos.	Nation	Player

=== Out on loan ===
Note: Flags indicate national team as defined under FIFA eligibility rules; some limited exceptions apply. Players may hold more than one non-FIFA nationality.

No. / Pos. / Nation / Player; — / MF / ALB / Steven Bala (at Chorley until 30 June 2027)	No. / Pos. / Nation / Player

== Coaching staff ==
Coaching staff
Name	Role
(Iceland) Fannar Berg Gunnólfsson	Head coach
(Sweden) Jussi Kontinen (Denmark) Benjamin Chor	Assistant coach
(Sweden) Joakim Sternas	Goalkeeper coach
(Greece) Konstantinos Ntolaptsis	Fitness coach
(Denmark) Andreas Søndergaard (Denmark) Albert Kaarnøe	Physiotherapist
(Denmark) Kim Villy Nielsen (Denmark) Allan Petersen	Kit manager

Table last updated: 16 November 2026.

== National team players ==
The table below lists players who have played for AB at some point and have played official full internationals for their country, whether or not the caps were won while at AB.

Players with senior international caps
Name	Born	Position	Nationality	Ref.
Anis Ben Slimane	16-03-2001	Midfielder	Tunisia	
Philip Oslev	27-11-1994	Defender	Burundi	
Hørður Askham	22-09-1994	Defender	Faroe Islands	
Jabar Sharza	06-04-1994	Midfielder	Afghanistan	
Lukas Lerager	12-07-1993	Midfielder	Denmark	
Bassel Jradi	06-07-1993	Midfielder	Lebanon	
Nicolai Jørgensen	15-01-1991	Striker	Denmark	
Christian Gytkjær	06-05-1990	Striker	Denmark	
Danny Olsen	11-06-1985	Midfielder	Denmark	
Simon Richter	16-01-1985	Defender	Gambia	
Nabil Aslam	03-08-1984	Defender	Pakistan	
Gradimir Crnogorac	14-11-1982	Defender	Bosnia and Herzegovina	
Stephan Andersen	26-11-1981	Goalkeeper	Denmark	
Emmanuel Ake	11-06-1980	Striker	Kenya	
Ahmed Garba	24-05-1980	Midfielder	Nigeria	
Christian Høgni Jacobsen	12-05-1980	Striker	Faroe Islands	
Martin Albrechtsen	31-03-1980	Defence	Denmark	
Peter Løvenkrands	29-01-1980	Striker	Denmark	
Rasmus Daugaard	05-09-1976	Defender	Denmark	
Marc Nygaard	01-09-1976	Striker	Denmark	
Carsten Fredgaard	20-05-1976	Midfielder	Denmark	
Abdul Sule	20-01-1975	Striker	Nigeria	
Kenneth Pérez	29-08-1974	Midfielder	Denmark	
Michael Johansen	22-07-1972	Midfielder	Denmark	
Steven Lustü	13-04-1971	Defence	Denmark	
Carsten Hemmingsen	18-12-1970	Midfielder	Denmark	
Jan Michaelsen	28-11-1970	Midfielder	Denmark	
Claus Thomsen	31-05-1970	Midfielder	Denmark	
Peter Frank	26-05-1970	Defender	Denmark	
Christian Karlsson	20-09-1969	Defender	Sweden	
René Henriksen	27-08-1969	Defence	Denmark	
Brian Steen Nielsen	28-12-1968	Midfielder	Denmark	
Heine Fernandez	14-07-1966	Striker	Denmark	
Søren Lyng	08-07-1966	Striker	Denmark	
Per Frimann	04-06-1962	Striker	Denmark	
Flemming Christensen	10-04-1958	Striker	Denmark	
Benny Nielsen	17-03-1951	Striker	Denmark	
Peter Dahl	14-02-1948	Striker	Denmark	
Johnny Petersen	27-11-1947	Midfielder	Denmark	
Henrik Bernburg	09-04-1947	Striker	Denmark	
Kresten Bjerre	22-02-1946	Midfielder	Denmark	
Max Rasmussen	11-12-1945	Midfielder	Denmark	
Flemming Kjærsgaard	12-07-1945	Striker	Denmark	
Jan Larsen	22-03-1945	Defence	Denmark	
Erik Sandvad	27-01-1945	Midfielder	Denmark	
Niels Yde	02-10-1944	Defence	Denmark	
Finn Wiberg	07-05-1943	Striker	Denmark	
Flemming Nielsen	24-02-1934	Midfielder	Denmark	
Jens-Carl Kristensen	02-03-1933	Striker	Denmark	
Ove Bech Nielsen	03-08-1932	Striker	Denmark	
Verner Nielsen	14-05-1931	Defence	Denmark	
Erik Jensen	06-12-1930	Midfielder	Denmark	
Frank Rechendorff	23-10-1928	Striker	Denmark	
Kaj Jørgensen	11-10-1925	Goalkeeper	Denmark	
Christen Brøgger	29-08-1925	Defence	Denmark	
James Rønvang	17-07-1925	Striker	Denmark	
Dan Ohland-Andersen	15-05-1924	Defence	Denmark	
Hartvig Møller	27-03-1924	Striker	Denmark	
Steen Blicher	22-11-1923	Midfielder	Denmark	
Ivan Jensen	10-11-1922	Midfielder	Denmark	
Holger Seebach	17-03-1922	Striker	Denmark	
Karl Aage Hansen	04-07-1921	Striker	Denmark	
Poul Petersen	11-04-1921	Defence	Denmark	
Knud Lundberg	14-05-1920	Striker	Denmark	
Knud Bastrup-Birk	12-12-1919	Defence	Denmark	
Georg Dahlfelt	12-04-1919	Midfielder	Denmark	
Svend Albrechtsen	27-02-1917	Striker	Denmark	
Adolph Mølsgaard	06-11-1914	Defence	Denmark	
Willy Larsson	30-10-1914	Defence	Denmark	
Eigil Thielsen	17-08-1914	Striker	Denmark	
Poul Toft Jensen	14-08-1912	Midfielder	Denmark	
Carl Larsen	25-03-1911	Midfielder	Denmark	
Poul Sørensen	04-09-1910	Defence	Denmark	
Svend Sanvig	05-12-1909	Midfielder	Denmark	
Sigfred Jensen	06-03-1909	Midfielder	Denmark	
Eyolf Kleven	27-02-1908	Striker	Denmark	
Palle Christensen	27-12-1902	Defence	Denmark	
Harry Bendixen	13-10-1901	Defence	Denmark	
Arne Kleven	08-01-1900	Midfielder	Denmark	
Edvin Frigast Larsen	20-12-1899	Goalkeeper	Denmark	
Otto Moltke	10-07-1897	Defence	Denmark	
Svend Knudsen	18-01-1896	Midfielder	Denmark	
Svend Holm	25-10-1895	Striker	Denmark	
Gunnar Aaby	09-07-1895	Midfielder	Denmark	
Henrik Andersen	11-02-1894	Midfielder	Denmark	
Svend Ringsted	30-08-1893	Defence	Denmark	
Holger Teilmann	20-07-1893	Midfielder	Denmark	
Samuel Thorsteinsson	01-01-1893	Midfielder	Denmark	
Svend V. Knudsen	22-02-1892	Striker	Denmark	
Ernst Petersen	16-08-1890	Midfielder	Denmark	
Paul Berth	07-04-1890	Midfielder	Denmark	
Harald Bohr	22-04-1887	Midfielder	Denmark	
Charles Buchwald	22-10-1880	Defence	Denmark	

Table last updated: 17 November 2026

== Coaches since 1963 ==
Head coaches since 1963
Period	Name	Nationality	Ref.
1963–1965	Ivan Jensen	Denmark	
1965	Frank Soo	England	
1966–1968	Mario Astorri	Italy	
1968–1969	Ernst Netuka	Denmark	
1970	Karl Aage Hansen	Denmark	
1970–1971	Jørgen Hvidemose	Denmark	
1972	Karl Aage Hansen	Denmark	
1973–1975	Jack Cummings	Northern Ireland	
1975–1976	Niels Erik Rasmussen	Denmark	
1977	Arne Borsdal	Denmark	
1978–1983	Christian Andersen	Denmark	
1983	Jan Andersen	Denmark	
1984	Peter Dahl	Denmark	
1985–1986	Christian Andersen	Denmark	
1986	Henning Kurland	Denmark	
1987	Kresten Bjerre	Denmark	
1988–1990	Claus Bo Hansen	Denmark	
1990	Henning Kurland	Denmark	
1990	Jan Larsen	Denmark	
1991	Peter Jensen	Denmark	
1992–1995	Johnny Petersen	Denmark	
1995	Christian Andersen	Denmark	
1996	Tonni Nielsen	Denmark	
1996–1998	Christian Andersen	Denmark	
1999–2000	Ole Mørk	Denmark	
2000	Peter Frandsen / Flemming Christensen	Denmark	
2001–2003	Ove Christensen	Denmark	
2003	Peter Frandsen	Denmark	
2003–2005	Henrik Jensen	Denmark	
2005–2007	Christian Andersen / Allan Michaelsen	Denmark	
2007	Johnny Petersen	Denmark	
2007–2010	Flemming Christensen	Denmark	
2010–2012	Kasper Kurland	Denmark	
2012–2013	Henrik Lehm	Denmark	
2013–2015	Thomas Nørgaard	Denmark	
2015–2016	Per Frandsen	Denmark	
2017	Søren Bjerg	Denmark	
2017–2019	Michael Madsen	Denmark	
2019–2023	Patrick Birch Braune	Denmark	
2023	Simon Ervolder Andresen (interim)	Denmark	
2023–2024	David Roufpanah	Sweden	
2024	Fabiana Alcalá (interim)	Spain	
2024–2025	Jóhannes Karl Guðjónsson	Iceland	
2025–	Fannar Berg Gunnólfsson	Iceland	

Table last updated: 22 November 2026

== Supporters ==
=== Fan club ===
AB's official fan club is called AB Forever and was founded on August 17, 1995. During home matches, the fan club stands on Gladsaxe Stadium's section E. Work on founding the fan club began in the spring of 1993 when a group of youth coaches increasingly felt frustrated over the fact that AB's youth players did not come to the stadium when AB's first team played matches. AB played in the 3rd tier under the leadership of Johnny Petersen and had great players such as René Henriksen and Peter Rasmussen on the team. The football was entertaining but there was no atmosphere in the stadium when the team played. The group of youth coaches therefore began organizing themselves with the aim of getting more supporters to the stadium. The group who later established the fan club got its name from the first team's most dangerous player, the striker Finn Buchardt who has scored 62 goals for AB. In a match against Herlev IF on June 6, 1993, Finn Buchardt scored four goals in the last 15 minutes of the match, meaning that a potential 2–2 draw was turned to a 6–3 victory. The last 15 minutes of a football match were from then on called "Boogie time" with reference to Finn Buchardt, and the group of fans around the youth coaches subsequently called themselves "Boogie's friends".

As more supporters joined, the need for a more formal organization became apparent, and the group held a founding general assembly on August 17, 1995. The general meeting named AB's first fan club AB Forever and appointed Thomas Gram as the fan club's first president. The vision for the fan club was to distance itself from violence and to support the team in an unconventional way, which was reflected in a variety of humorous songs and a friendly approach to supporting the team.

In the following years, the fan club took the initiative to produce and sell merchandise in the form of caps, scarves and T-shirts. However, AB bought the inventory and took over the merchandise sales in 1997.

=== Rivalries ===
AB's supporters are known for their rivalries with the neighboring clubs of Lyngby Boldklub and Brønshøj Boldklub.

AB's matches against Brønshøj Boldklub are known as the Bog Derby. By tradition, a win gives the victorious team the "right" to the nearby bog Utterslev Mose. The clubs have met many times in both the league and the cup, and AB have won considerably more of the meetings. The most recent Bog Derby was played on 25 August 2026 in the second round of the Danish Cup, where AB won 4–2 away in front of 2,967 spectators, a stadium record according to LigaManager.

=== Spectators ===
The table below shows the development of spectators at AB's home matches since the season 1996/1997.

Attendance at AB's home matches
Season	League	Matches	Total	Average	Highest	Lowest
2025/2026	3rd tier	11 (Note: Spectator count missing for five matches.)	8.865	806	1.544	409
2024/2025	3rd tier	15 (Note: Spectator count missing for one match.)	10.795	720	1.627	467
2023/2024	3rd tier	11 (Note: Spectator count missing for five matches.)	5.177	471	757	298
2022/2023	3rd tier	14 (Note: Spectator count missing for two matches.)	8.606	615	1.130	289
2021/2022	3rd tier	15 (Note: Spectator count missing for one match.)	6.281	418	789	177
2020/2021	3rd tier	7 (Note: Spectator count is missing for the season's six last matches. Due to COVID-19, the maximum number of allowed spectators was constrained.)	2.934	419	860	310
2019/2020	3rd tier	12 (Note: The season was shortened, and the maximum number of allowed spectators was set to 500 due to COVID-19.)	4.290	358	567	197
2018/2019	3rd tier	17	6.649	391	969	267
2017/2018	3rd tier	15	6.152	410	789	100
2016/2017	2nd tier	16	9.374	586	755	415
2015/2016	3rd tier	15	10.894	726	1.308	412
2014/2015	2nd tier	16	14.971	936	1.795	571
2013/2014	2nd tier	16	15.505	969	2.520	583
2012/2013	2nd tier	15 (Note: The home match against FC Fyn is not included as it was not played due to the bankruptcy of the club.)	13.300	887	2.057	377
2011/2012	2nd tier	13	11.807	908	1.409	621
2010/2011	2nd tier	15	14.873	992	1.646	478
2009/2010	2nd tier	15	18.519	1.235	2.366	785
2008/2009	2nd tier	13 (Note: The home matches against FC Amager og Køge BK are not included as they were not played because of the bankruptcy of FC Amager and the forced relegation of Køge BK due to their merger with Herfølge Boldklub.)	16.555	1.273	3.804	781
2007/2008	2nd tier	15	12.519	835	1.096	584
2006/2007	2nd tier	15	16.307	1.087	2.120	609
2005/2006	2nd tier	15	15.146	1.010	2.271	644
2004/2005	2nd tier	15	13.397	893	1.225	426
2003/2004	1st tier	16	46.158	2.885	10.039	1.133
2002/2003	1st tier	17	52.259	3.074	7.321	1.421
2001/2002	1st tier	16	42.042	2.628	6.017	1.224
2000/2001	1st tier	17	52.044	3.061	5.346	1.395
1999/2000	1st tier	17	78.507	4.618	9.125	2.218
1998/1999	1st tier	17	54.427	3.202	7.115	1.352
1997/1998	1st tier	16	48.943	3.059	9.304	1.184
1996/1997	1st tier	16	33.770	2.111	6.119	585

Table last updated: 8 June 2026.

== Management ==
=== Chairmen ===
The table below lists the chairmen of the board of AB's football company, first Akademisk Boldklubs Fodboldanpartsselskab and later AB A/S. Dates are registration dates in the Danish Central Business Register (CVR), whose records go back to January 1986.

Chairmen
Period	Person
?–20/11-1986	Swen Nielsen
20/11-1986–12/09-1988	Allan Gramkow Bidsted
12/09-1988–11/11-1998	Erik Neergaard
11/11-1998–03/03-2000	Denis Jørgen Flemming Holmark
03/03-2000–04/11-2002	Mogens Trygve Lied Flagstad
27/11-2002–28/05-2009	Jens Hjortskov
28/05-2009–30/05-2011	Erik Hovgaard
30/05-2011–15/08-2013	Ronny Saul
15/08-2013–22/05-2014	Pernille Ørskov
22/05-2014–24/11-2014	Ronny Saul
24/11-2014–05/05-2015	Torben Oldenborg
05/05-2015–06/06-2017	Steen Kristensen
06/06-2017–23/11-2022	Torben Oldenborg
23/11-2022–20/08-2024	Jen Hsiang Chang
20/08-2024-	Brian Joseph Grieco

Table last updated: 17 November 2026.

=== CEOs ===
The table below is an overview of CEOs of AB throughout time.

CEOs
Period	Person
?–10/08-1989	Sven Erik Hansen
10/08-1989–09/07-1992	Jan Sørensen
09/07-1992–12/08-1998	Henrik Mostrup
12/08-1998–03/10-2001	Per Frimann
03/10-2001–05/03-2003	Henrik Stephansen Vestergaard
05/03-2003–11/12-2003	Steen Andersen
11/12-2003–01/03-2005	Torben Oldenborg
01/03-2005–30/05-2011	Ronny Saul
30/05-2011–01/08-2011	Alex Thyge Rasmussen
01/08-2011–19/10-2011	Lenni Skov Lindegaard
19/10-2011–01/11-2012	Liselotte Bisbjerg
01/11-2012–2019	Peter Rasmussen
2019	Christina Schramm
2020–2022	Dan Axel Holst
2022–2023	Erik Stover
2023–2026	Sofie Brandi Petersen
2026–	Henrik Skjoldager Bom

Table last updated: 22 November 2026.
