= René Henriksen =

Danish footballer and scout (born 1969)

Personal information
- Full name: René Henriksen
- Date of birth: 27 August 1969 (age 57)
- Place of birth: Glostrup, Denmark
- Height: 1.83 m (6 ft 0 in)
- Position: Sweeper

Team information
- Current team: Panathinaikos (scout)

Senior career*
Years	Team	Apps	(Gls)
1988–1999	AB	339	(42)
1999–2005	Panathinaikos	136	(0)
2005–2006	AB	0	(0)
Total		475	(42)

International career
1998–2004	Denmark	66	(0)
- * Club domestic league appearances and goals

René Henriksen (Danish pronunciation: [ʁəˈneː ˈhɛnˀʁɛɡ.sn̩]; born 27 August 1969) is a Danish former professional footballer who played as a defender for Danish club Akademisk Boldklub and Panathinaikos in Greece. Henriksen was capped 66 times for the Danish national team, and he represented his country at two FIFA World Cups and two European Championship tournaments. He is currently a scout for Panathinaikos.

== Career ==
Born in Glostrup, Henriksen started playing for nine-times Danish champions Akademisk Boldklub (AB) in 1988, then in the lower leagues of Danish football. AB joined the top-flight Danish Superliga championship in 1996, and Henriksen established himself as one of the best defenders in the league. From his libero position, his elegance, technique and anticipation made him an efficient organizer of the AB defense. AB coach Christian Andersen proclaimed Henriksen as "Denmark's best libero", and in March 1998 he was called up for the Danish national team by national team manager Bo Johansson. He made his debut in the friendly match 1–0 win against Scotland as he came on as a substitute at half time, replacing defender Jacob Laursen. Henriksen was selected to represent Denmark at the 1998 FIFA World Cup, though he did not play any games at the tournament.

He won the "Danish Cup Fighter" award when AB triumphed in the 1999 Danish Cup, as the club won its first trophy in 32 years. With a year left of his contract, he left AB in the summer 1999, after eleven years playing for the club. He moved to Greece to play for Panathinaikos in a transfer deal allegedly worth 20 million DKK. He became a starting player for the Danish national team, and represented Denmark at the 2000 European Championship, where he played full-time in Denmark's three matches. Subsequently, he received the 2000 Danish Player of the Year award.

He was joined at Panathinaikos by fellow Dane and former AB player Jan Michaelsen in 2001, and the two players were important pieces in Panathinaikos' UEFA Champions League campaigns. Most notably, the club reached the quarter-final of the 2001–02 tournament before being eliminated by Spanish club FC Barcelona. Henriksen was an important member of the national team at the 2002 FIFA World Cup, where Denmark reached the round of 16. After the tournament, team captain Jan Heintze retired from the national team, and Henriksen was named new team captain by national team manager Morten Olsen.

The 2003–04 season was Henriksen's most successful year at Panathinaikos, as the club broke rivals Olympiacos' seven-year streak when they won the 2004 Greek Super League. Panathinaikos also won the 2004 Greek Cup, to complete "The Double". Henriksen played Denmark's four games at the 2004 European Championship, before he ended his national team career after the tournament. He played a total of 66 national team games, 25 of which were as captain. Even though he did not score any goals, his elegant playing style meant he only received two yellow cards during his national team career.

In the summer break 2005, Henriksen returned to AB, now in the second-tier Danish 1st Division league. He helped the team avoid relegation in the 2005–06 season, before he ended his career in the summer 2006.

== Honours ==
Akademisk Boldklub

- Danish Cup: 1999

Panathinaikos

- Greek Super League: 2004
- Greek Cup: 2004

Individual

- Danish Player of the Year: 2000

Sporting positions
Preceded by Jan Heintze	Denmark captain 2002–2004	Succeeded by Jon Dahl Tomasson
