= Henning Bjerregaard =

Danish footballer (1927–2014)

Personal information
- Date of birth: 6 March 1927
- Date of death: 9 October 2014 (aged 87)
- Position: Forward

Senior career*
| Years | Team | Apps | (Gls) |
- AGF Aarhus
- B 93

International career
| 1954 | Denmark | 1 | (0) |
- * Club domestic league appearances and goals

Henning Bjerregaard (6 March 1927 – 9 October 2014) was a Danish amateur footballer who played for AGF Aarhus and B 93 in Denmark. He was the top scorer of the 1951 Danish football championship, playing for B93. He won the Danish championship twice (1955 and 1956) and also the very first Danish Cup final in 1955 while playing for AGF. But he returned to play for B 93 after his second Danish championship for AGF in 1956. He was capped once for Denmark in 1954.

His career suddenly ended in August 1959, after he had been involved in a serious car accident. Intoxicated by alcohol, he fell asleep in his car and killed two foreign students who were driving a scooter. He escaped unharmed, but served 12 months imprisonment because of the incident.

He died on 9 October 2014 following short illness.
