= Jens-Carl Kristensen =

Danish footballer (1933–2018)

Personal information
- Full name: Jens-Carl Anker Kristensen
- Date of birth: 2 March 1933
- Place of birth: Frederiksberg, Denmark
- Date of death: 5 June 2018 (aged 85)
- Position: Forward

Senior career*
Years	Team	Apps	(Gls)
1951–1956	AB		
1956–1958	FC La Chaux-de-Fonds		
1958–1961	AB		

International career
1951	Denmark U19	1	(1)
1952–1953	Denmark U21	3	(1)
1955	Denmark B	1	(1)
1955	Denmark	1	(0)
- * Club domestic league appearances and goals

Jens-Carl Anker Kristensen (2 March 1933 – 5 June 2018), alternatively spelled Jens-Carl Christensen, was a Danish footballer who played as a forward for AB and for Swiss club FC La Chaux-de-Fonds. He won the Danish championship with AB in the 1951–52 season and was the top goalscorer of the 1953–54 season. For the Denmark national team he played one game. When Kristensen moved abroad to FC La Chaux-de-Fonds in Switzerland he became one of the first Danish professional players. He died on 5 June 2018, at the age of 85.
