= Football records and statistics in Denmark =

This article lists various Danish football records for the various Danish football leagues and competitions.

== Team records ==
Most Championships: 16

- FC København .

Most Cup wins: 10

- FC København

== Most successful clubs overall ==
As of 17 May 2026

Club	Domestic Titles										European Titles				Overall titles
Club	Danish League	Danish Cup	MFC	DPT	Danish Super Cup	Danish League Cup	DT	CC	VC	Total	Royal League	UEFA Intertoto Cup	Intertoto Cup	Total	Overall titles
København	16	10	-	-	3	1	-	-	-	30	2	-	-	2	32
Brøndby	11	7	-	-	4	2	-	1	-	25	1	-	1	2	27
KB	15	1	1	1	-	-	-	-	-	18	-	-	-	-	18
AGF	6	9	-	-	-	-	-	-	-	15	-	-	-	-	15
AB	9	1	-	-	1	-	-	1	-	12	-	-	-	-	12
B 1903	7	2	-	-	-	-	-	2	-	11	-	-	-	-	11
Vejle	5	6	-	-	-	-	-	-	-	11	-	-	-	-	11
B 93	9	1	-	-	-	-	-	-	-	10	-	-	-	-	10
Esbjerg	5	3	-	-	-	-	1	-	-	9	-	-	-	-	9
Frem	6	2	-	-	-	-	-	-	-	8	-	-	-	-	8
OB	3	5	-	-	-	-	-	-	-	8	-	-	-	-	8
AaB	4	3	-	-	-	-	-	-	-	7	-	-	-	-	7
Midtjylland	4	3	-	-	-	-	-	-	-	7	-	-	-	-	7
Lyngby	2	3	-	-	-	-	-	-	-	5	-	-	1	1	6
B 1909	2	2	-	-	-	-	1	-	-	5	-	-	-	-	5
Silkeborg	1	2	-	-	-	-	-	-	-	3	-	1	-	1	4
Hvidovre	3	1	-	-	-	-	-	-	-	4	-	-	-	-	4
Nordsjælland	1	2	-	-	-	-	-	-	1	4	-	-	-	-	4
Randers Freja	-	3	-	-	-	-	-	-	-	3	-	-	-	-	3
Ikast	-	-	-	-	-	-	-	1	-	1	-	-	1	1	2
Køge BK	2	-	-	-	-	-	-	-	-	2	-	-	-	-	2
Randers	-	2	-	-	-	-	-	-	-	2	-	-	-	-	2
Viborg	-	1	-	-	1	-	-	-	-	2	-	-	-	-	2
Herfølge	1	-	-	-	-	-	-	-	-	1	-	-	-	-	1
B 1913	-	1	-	-	-	-	-	-	-	1	-	-	-	-	1
Sønderjyske	-	1	-	-	-	-	-	-	-	1	-	-	-	-	1
Vanløse	-	1	-	-	-	-	-	-	-	1	-	-	-	-	1
Brønshøj	-	-	-	-	-	-	-	1	-	1	-	-	-	-	1
Jyderup	-	-	-	-	-	-	-	1	-	1	-	-	-	-	1

== See also ==
- Football in Denmark
- Denmark national football team
- Danish Cup
- List of football clubs by competitive honours won
