= List of FC Nordsjælland managers =

This is a list of F.C. Nordsjælland's managers and their records, from 1991, when the team was founded as Farum Boldklub, to the present day.

== Records ==
There have been eight different managers of FCN since 1991. Both Jørgen Tideman (1994–1999) and Morten Wieghorst (2006–2011) are the longest-running manager in terms of time. Tom Nielsen (2000) is the shortest-running manager of FCN, having coached the club for less than a year before being replaced. The most successful manager was Wieghorst, winning F.C. Nordsjælland their first trophy in 2010 with the Danish Cup and again in 2011. In terms of league position, Kasper Hjulmand (2011–2014 and 2016–present) took FCN to its highest league finish in 2011-12 with 1st place in the Danish Superliga.

== Managers ==
As of 23 May 2012.

Name	Nationality	From	To	Honours
Jørgen Andersen	Denmark	1992	1994	
Jørgen Tideman	Denmark	1994	1999	
Per Benjaminsen	Denmark	1999	2000	
Tom Nielsen	Denmark	2000	2000	
Christian Andersen	Denmark	2001	2004	Promotion to Superliga
Johnny Petersen	Denmark	January 1, 2005	June 30, 2006	
Morten Wieghorst	Denmark	July 1, 2006	June 30, 2011	2 Danish Cups
Kasper Hjulmand	Denmark	July 1, 2011	June 1, 2014	1 Superliga Championship
Ólafur Kristjánsson	Iceland	June 1, 2014	December 15, 2015	
Kasper Hjulmand	Denmark	January 1, 2016	March 25, 2019	
Flemming Petersen	Denmark	March 25, 2019	January 7, 2023	
Johannes Hoff Thorup	Denmark	January 7, 2023		

Key

* Served as caretaker manager.
† Served as caretaker manager before being appointed permanently.
