= 1950–51 Danish 1st Division =

6th season of Danish 1st Division

Danish 1st Division
- Season: 1950–51

The 1950–51 Danish 1st Division season was the 6th edition of Danish 1st Division annual football competition in Denmark. It was contested by 10 teams.

Kjøbenhavns Boldklub unsuccessfully defended its 1950 title. Akademisk Boldklub successfully pursued its 1951 title.

Statistics of Danish 1st Division in the 1950/1951 season.

== League standings ==
Pos	Team	Pld	W	D	L	GF	GA	GD	Pts
1	Akademisk Boldklub	18	11	6	1	34	15	+19	28
2	Odense Boldklub	18	8	3	7	19	26	−7	19
3	Aarhus Gymnastikforening	18	5	8	5	31	28	+3	18
4	Køge BK	18	7	4	7	30	31	−1	18
5	Boldklubben 1903	18	7	3	8	25	24	+1	17
6	Boldklubben Frem	18	5	7	6	24	24	0	17
7	Boldklubben af 1893	18	7	3	8	27	28	−1	17
8	Esbjerg fB	18	7	2	9	31	37	−6	16
9	Boldklubben 1909	18	5	6	7	23	30	−7	16
10	Kjøbenhavns Boldklub	18	4	6	8	24	25	−1	14

== Results ==
Home \ Away	ABK	AGF	B93	B03	B09	EFB	BKF	KB	KBK	OB
Akademisk BK	—	0–1	2–1	2–1	1–1	5–0	4–3	2–1	2–2	0–0
Aarhus GF	0–0	—	3–3	0–2	6–0	2–3	1–1	3–3	1–1	4–1
B.93	1–3	0–1	—	1–1	3–2	3–2	1–0	0–0	2–0	4–1
B 1903	1–2	2–0	1–0	—	3–1	4–1	1–1	3–1	3–0	0–4
B 1909	1–2	2–2	3–1	1–0	—	3–2	0–3	0–0	4–1	0–0
Esbjerg fB	0–1	3–1	1–4	3–0	2–1	—	3–1	4–2	2–0	1–3
BK Frem	1–1	2–2	2–1	2–1	0–0	1–1	—	2–0	1–3	0–1
Kjøbenhavns BK	1–3	1–2	3–0	1–1	0–1	1–1	0–0	—	2–0	5–0
Køge BK	0–4	2–2	3–0	3–1	2–2	3–2	3–0	2–3	—	1–0
Odense BK	0–0	2–0	0–2	1–0	2–1	2–0	1–4	1–0	0–4	—

Legend: Blue = home team win; Yellow = draw; Red = away team win.
