= Mario Astorri =

Italian footballer and manager (1920–1989)

Personal information
- Date of birth: 7 August 1920
- Place of birth: Piacenza, Italy
- Date of death: 3 December 1989 (aged 69)
- Position: Forward

Senior career*
Years	Team	Apps	(Gls)
1939–1941	Mestre	26	(15)
1941–1942	Schio	26	(10)
1942–1943	Ferrara	21	(20)
1943–1945	Venezia	29	(31)
1945–1946	SPAL	19	(11)
1946–1947	Juventus	23	(17)
1947–1949	Atalanta	53	(13)
1949–1953	Napoli	88	(30)
1953–1954	Monza	19	(7)
1955–1956	Cenisia		

Managerial career
- 1957–1958: A.C. Meda 1913
- 1958–1959: Falck & Arcore
- 1962: Hørsholm-Usserød IK
- 1964–1966: Køge
- 1967: AB
- 1968–1969: Hvidovre
- 1970: Holbæk B&I
- 1971–1979: KB
- 1980–1983: HIK
- * Club domestic league appearances and goals

Mario Astorri (7 August 1920 – 3 December 1989) was an Italian football player and coach, who played as a forward. He won the Danish Superliga twice, the first time while coaching AB Gladsaxe in 1967, and the second time while in charge of Kjøbenhavns Boldklub in 1974.
