= Per Frimann =

Danish footballer (born 1962)

Personal information
- Full name: Per Frimann Hansen
- Date of birth: 4 June 1962 (age 64)
- Place of birth: Gladsaxe, Denmark
- Height: 1.77 m (5 ft 9 1/2 in)
- Position: Midfielder

Senior career*
Years	Team	Apps	(Gls)
1980	Akademisk Boldklub		
1981	Kjøbenhavns Boldklub	15	(5)
1982–1988	RSC Anderlecht	158	(32)
1988	→ Aarhus GF (loan)	7	(0)
1989–1990	Brøndby IF	28	(6)

International career
1979–1980	Denmark U-19	7	(4)
1981–1983	Denmark U-21	10	(1)
1983–1989	Denmark	17	(1)
- * Club domestic league appearances and goals

Per Frimann Hansen (born 4 June 1962) is a Danish former football player. He played 158 matches as a midfielder for Belgian club RSC Anderlecht, with whom he won three Belgian championships, as well as the 1983 UEFA Cup. He played 17 matches and scored one goal for the Danish national team, and represented his country at the 1986 FIFA World Cup and 1988 European Championship. Since his retirement, Frimann has become an acclaimed football pundit and presenter.

== Biography ==
Frimann started his career with Danish club Akademisk Boldklub (AB) under manager Christian Andersen. In 1980, Frimann made his senior debut for AB, who played in the top-flight Danish 1st Division. In 1981, Frimann moved to Kjøbenhavns Boldklub (KB). At KB, he was noticed by Belgian club Anderlecht, and he went to play for the club a season later. Frimann immediately got a place in the Anderlecht starting line-up, and he made his debut for the Danish national team in October 1983. Frimann remained seven seasons in Anderlecht, where he won three Belgian championships and the 1983 UEFA Cup. In his time at the club, he played alongside a number of fellow Danish national team players, most notably national team captain Morten Olsen.

In 1988, after many injury problems at Anderlecht, the 26-year-old Frimann decided to return to Denmark. He was bought by Brøndby IF, and loaned out to Aarhus GF (AGF) in the 1988 season, where he won the 1988 Danish Cup.

In 1989, he moved from AGF to Brøndby, where Morten Olsen was manager. In August 1990, Frimann ended his playing career, at 28 years of age, due to continued injury problems. He was the first player on Danish soil to have a testimonial match to his benefit, as the Danish 1986 World Cup team beat Brøndby IF 6–4.

=== International career ===
Selected for the Danish squad at the 1986 World Cup, Frimann looked like becoming an important part of the Danish team. A complicated ankle injury, sustained during the last training camp before the tournament, kept Frimann from playing at the 1986 World Cup, and for the rest of his career he would struggle with injuries. Frimann was a part of the Danish team which qualified for the 1988 Summer Olympics, but the team never got to compete in the final tournament. It was discovered that Frimann was not eligible for the 2–0 win over Poland in which he played, and Denmark was penalised the points of the win. This cost the spot at the final tournament. He was a part of the Danish squad for the 1988 European Championship, where he took part in a single match.

=== Retirement ===
Following his retirement, he worked with public relations in the European Commission from 1992 to 1996. He was hired as an internal consulent in Danmarks Idrætsforbund in 1996. In April 1998, he became the sports director of former club AB. When AB manager Christian Andersen agreed a contract with league rivals F.C. Copenhagen in October 1998, eight months before his contract expiry in June 1999, Frimann initially refused to let Andersen go before time and suspended him. He soon changed his mind and let Andersen go, but the two would go on to have a strained relationship. In his time at AB, the club lost a great part of its market liquidity, and he left the club in 2002. He then became a sportscaster at the Onside football show on the TV3 Denmark TV-channel. In his 2004 autobiography, Andersen questioned Frimann's involvement in AB's financial losses, and though Frimann aired the possibility of a lawsuit, the matter was resolved when Andersen made a public apology.

== Honours ==
RSC Anderlecht

- Belgian First Division: 1984–85, 1985–86, 1986–87
- Belgian Super Cup: 1985, 1987
- UEFA Cup: 1982–83 (winners), 1983–84 (runners-up)
- Jules Pappaert Cup: 1983, 1985
- Bruges Matins: 1985

=== Århus ===
- Danish Cup: 1987–88

=== Brøndby IF ===
- Danish Football Championship: 1990
- Danish Cup: 1988-89
