= Peter Rasmussen =

Peter Rasmussen may refer to:

- Peter Rasmussen (badminton) (born 1974), Danish badminton player
- Peter Rasmussen (Counter-Strike player) (born 1993), Danish eSports player known as dupreeh
- Peter Rasmussen (filmmaker) (1956–2008), Australian film-maker
- Peter Rasmussen (footballer, born 1967), striker for AaB and Denmark
- Peter Rasmussen (footballer, born 1969), Danish midfielder for AB
- Peter Rasmussen (referee) (born 1975), Danish football referee
