= Flemming Kjærsgaard =

Danish footballer (born 1945)

Personal information
- Full name: Flemming Alfred Kjærsgaard
- Date of birth: 12 July 1945 (age 81)
- Place of birth: Bispebjerg, Denmark
- Position: Forward

Senior career*
Years	Team	Apps	(Gls)
1966–1970	Akademisk Boldklub		
1970–1972	KV Mechelen	54	(11)
1972–1976	Akademisk Boldklub		

International career
1966–1967	Denmark U21	7	(0)
1968–1970	Denmark	6	(0)
- * Club domestic league appearances and goals

Flemming Alfred Kjærsgaard (born 12 July 1945) is a Danish former footballer who played as a forward. He made six appearances for the Denmark national team from 1968 to 1970.
