= Philip Oslev =

Danish-born Burundian footballer (born 1994)

Personal information
- Full name: Philip Nzeyimana Oslev
- Date of birth: 27 November 1994 (age 31)
- Place of birth: Herlev, Denmark
- Height: 1.75 m (5 ft 9 in)
- Position: Rightback

Team information
- Current team: AB
- Number: 3

Senior career*
Years	Team	Apps	(Gls)
2014–2016	Rudersdal		
2016–2018	Skovshoved		
2018–	AB	60	(2)

International career^{‡}
2020–	Burundi	1	(0)
- * Club domestic league appearances and goals as of 30 October 2020 ‡ National team caps and goals as of 30 October 2020

Philip Nzeyimana Oslev (born 27 November 1994) is a professional footballer who plays as a rightback for AB. Born in Denmark, he represents the Burundi national team.

== International career ==
Oslev was born in Denmark and is of Burundian descent through his father. He debuted for the Burundi national team in a friendly 1–0 win over Tanzania on 11 October 2020.
