= Marcus Bobjerg =

Danish footballer (born 1998)

Personal information
- Full name: Marcus Bobjerg Jakobsen
- Date of birth: 26 January 1998 (age 28)
- Place of birth: Horsens, Denmark
- Position: Goalkeeper

Team information
- Current team: AB
- Number: 1

Youth career
- Hatting/Torsted
- Horsens

Senior career*
| Years | Team | Apps | (Gls) |
| 2017–2018 | Horsens | 8 | (0) |
| 2018–2021 | Skive | 98 | (0) |
| 2021–2024 | Horsens | 6 | (0) |
| 2024– | AB | 15 | (0) |
- * Club domestic league appearances and goals as of 18 June 2026

Marcus Bobjerg Jakobsen (born 26 January 1998) is a Danish footballer who plays as a goalkeeper for AB in the Danish 2nd Division.

== Youth career ==
Bobjerg is a product of AC Horsens. At the age of 17 in June 2015, Bobjerg signed a two-year contract with the club. At this time, he was already involved with the first team.

== Club career ==
=== AC Horsens ===
Bobjerg's first first team experience was in March 2015 at the age of 17, where he sat on the bench for the whole game against FC Fredericia. He sat on the bench three times in this season in the league. In the following season, Bobjerg sat on the bench three times as well for the first team squad. In the winter 2016, after the departure of second choice goalkeeper Patryk Wolanski, Bobjerg got his contract extended until the summer 2018.

On 10 August 2016, Bobjerg got his debut for AC Horsens in a game against Tarm IF in the Danish Cup.

Bobjerg got his official debut for Horsens on 18 August 2017 at the age of only 17. It happened when first choice goalkeeper, Jesse Joronen, got injured during the warm up before the game against AaB in the Danish Superliga, which ended 0-0.

Bobjerg announced on 4 April 2018, that he would leave the club after the season, because he did not want to be the second choice anymore.

=== Skive IK ===
On 29 May 2018 Skive IK announced, that they had signed Bobjerg on a contract until 2019.

=== Return to Horsens ===
On 20 April 2021 it was confirmed, that Bobjerg would return to AC Horsens on 1 July 2021, to replace Aleksandar Stankovic. After three years at the club, Bobjerg left the club at the end of the 2023–24.

=== AB ===
On 10 May 2024 the Danish 2nd Division club Akademisk Boldklub confirmed that Bobjerg had signed a contract until June 2027, valid from the 2024–25 season.
