= 1969 Danish 1st Division =

24th season of Danish 1st Division

Danish 1st Division
- Season: 1969

Statistics of Danish 1st Division in the 1969 season.

== Overview ==
It was contested by 12 teams, and Boldklubben 1903 won the championship.

== League standings ==
| Pos | Team | Pld | W | D | L | GF | GA | GD | Pts |
|---|---|---|---|---|---|---|---|---|---|
| 1 | Boldklubben 1903 | 22 | 15 | 4 | 3 | 58 | 25 | +33 | 34 |
| 2 | Kjøbenhavns Boldklub | 22 | 14 | 2 | 6 | 58 | 38 | +20 | 30 |
| 3 | Aalborg Boldspilklub | 22 | 12 | 5 | 5 | 52 | 26 | +26 | 29 |
| 4 | Hvidovre IF | 22 | 11 | 4 | 7 | 35 | 34 | +1 | 26 |
| 5 | Horsens fS | 22 | 9 | 6 | 7 | 39 | 36 | +3 | 24 |
| 6 | Akademisk Boldklub | 22 | 9 | 5 | 8 | 32 | 36 | −4 | 23 |
| 7 | Boldklubben 1913 | 22 | 8 | 3 | 11 | 33 | 40 | −7 | 19 |
| 8 | Vejle Boldklub | 22 | 6 | 5 | 11 | 33 | 42 | −9 | 17 |
| 9 | Boldklubben Frem | 22 | 5 | 7 | 10 | 33 | 45 | −12 | 17 |
| 10 | B 1901 | 22 | 7 | 3 | 12 | 30 | 50 | −20 | 17 |
| 11 | Boldklubben 1909 | 22 | 6 | 4 | 12 | 44 | 56 | −12 | 16 |
| 12 | Esbjerg fB | 22 | 5 | 2 | 15 | 30 | 49 | −19 | 12 |

== Results ==
| Home \ Away | ABK | AaB | B01 | B03 | B09 | B13 | EFB | BKF | HOR | HIF | KBK | VBK |
|---|---|---|---|---|---|---|---|---|---|---|---|---|
| Akademisk BK | — | 1–0 | 5–2 | 0–2 | 0–0 | 4–1 | 2–1 | 1–0 | 4–1 | 0–0 | 2–6 | 2–2 |
| Aalborg BK | 3–0 | — | 4–0 | 2–2 | 12–2 | 1–1 | 2–1 | 3–1 | 1–2 | 1–4 | 1–0 | 4–2 |
| B 1901 | 1–0 | 0–3 | — | 2–1 | 2–4 | 3–1 | 3–0 | 0–0 | 4–3 | 1–4 | 2–2 | 2–0 |
| B 1903 | 3–0 | 1–1 | 1–0 | — | 4–3 | 2–0 | 3–1 | 6–1 | 3–0 | 2–3 | 5–2 | 4–3 |
| B 1900 | 7–2 | 2–3 | 0–2 | 1–3 | — | 2–4 | 4–0 | 3–1 | 2–2 | 0–2 | 1–3 | 2–5 |
| B 1913 | 1–1 | 0–2 | 5–2 | 0–4 | 1–0 | — | 4–3 | 2–3 | 0–3 | 0–1 | 2–0 | 0–0 |
| Esbjerg fB | 1–2 | 1–1 | 1–0 | 1–1 | 0–3 | 1–2 | — | 3–2 | 2–5 | 5–0 | 0–2 | 4–0 |
| BK Frem | 1–1 | 1–4 | 5–0 | 0–0 | 3–1 | 0–3 | 4–0 | — | 2–2 | 1–3 | 2–2 | 2–2 |
| Horsens fS | 1–0 | 0–3 | 2–2 | 0–2 | 1–1 | 3–1 | 2–0 | 3–0 | — | 1–1 | 3–2 | 3–0 |
| Hvidovre IF | 1–0 | 1–0 | 2–1 | 0–2 | 2–2 | 2–1 | 3–1 | 2–3 | 0–0 | — | 0–3 | 3–4 |
| Kjøbenhavns BK | 2–4 | 3–0 | 5–1 | 3–6 | 4–2 | 3–2 | 2–1 | 3–0 | 2–1 | 5–1 | — | 1–0 |
| Vejle BK | 0–1 | 1–1 | 2–0 | 2–1 | 0–2 | 0–2 | 2–3 | 1–1 | 4–1 | 1–0 | 2–3 | — |

Legend: Blue = home team win; Yellow = draw; Red = away team win.
