= 1955–56 Danish 1st Division =

11th season of Danish 1st Division

Danish 1st Division
- Season: 1955–56

The 1955–56 Danish 1st Division season was the 11th edition of Danish 1st Division annual football competition in Denmark. It was contested by 10 teams.

Aarhus Gymnastikforening successfully defended its 1955 title by successfully pursuing its 1956 title.

Statistics of Danish 1st Division in the 1955/1956 season.

== League standings ==
Pos	Team	Pld	W	D	L	GF	GA	GD	Pts	Qualification or relegation
1	Aarhus Gymnastikforening (C)	18	12	2	4	48	25	+23	26	Qualification for the European Cup preliminary round
2	Esbjerg fB	18	9	4	5	42	30	+12	22	
3	Akademisk Boldklub	18	9	4	5	39	31	+8	22	
4	Boldklubben 1909	18	7	6	5	34	29	+5	20	
5	Skovshoved IF	18	6	6	6	23	24	−1	18	
6	Boldklubben 1903	18	8	2	8	34	36	−2	18	
7	Boldklubben Frem	18	7	4	7	27	29	−2	18	
8	AIA	18	4	6	8	38	40	−2	14	
9	Kjøbenhavns Boldklub	18	3	7	8	22	37	−15	13	
10	Køge BK	18	3	3	12	25	51	−26	9	

(C) Champions

== Results ==
Home \ Away	ABK	AGF	AIA	B03	B09	EFB	BKF	KB	KBK	SKO
Akademisk BK	—	3–1	3–2	1–4	0–4	3–0	1–1	2–0	1–3	1–2
Aarhus GF	4–1	—	3–1	4–3	7–0	3–2	4–0	1–1	2–0	0–2
AI Aarhus	2–5	1–1	—	4–0	3–4	3–3	0–1	2–2	4–2	1–1
B 1903	0–3	1–2	3–3	—	3–0	2–2	0–3	4–3	5–3	2–1
B 1909	0–1	5–2	4–1	1–0	—	2–3	2–1	1–1	6–1	1–2
Esbjerg fB	2–2	1–0	4–3	0–2	1–1	—	5–1	3–0	6–0	3–1
BK Frem	2–6	0–2	1–0	3–0	0–0	3–1	—	2–3	4–1	0–0
Kjøbenhavns BK	1–1	1–5	0–1	1–3	2–2	1–0	1–3	—	1–0	1–1
Køge BK	2–2	2–4	1–5	0–1	1–1	1–2	3–2	3–3	—	1–2
Skovshoved IF	1–3	1–3	2–2	2–1	0–0	2–4	0–0	3–0	0–1	—

Legend: Blue = home team win; Yellow = draw; Red = away team win.
