= 1946–47 Danish 1st Division =

2nd season of Danish 1st Division

Danish 1st Division
- Season: 1946–47

The 1946–47 Danish 1st Division season was a football annual competition in the Danish 1st Division in Denmark. It was contested by 10 teams.

Akademisk Boldklub successfully defended its 1945 title defeating their opponent in the 1946 title final.

Statistics of Danish 1st Division in the 1946/1947 season.

== League standings ==
Pos	Team	Pld	W	D	L	GF	GA	GD	Pts
1	Akademisk Boldklub	18	14	0	4	56	36	+20	28
2	Kjøbenhavns Boldklub	18	11	4	3	51	30	+21	26
3	Fremad Amager	18	10	2	6	36	30	+6	22
4	Østerbros Boldklub	18	9	3	6	49	45	+4	21
5	Aarhus Gymnastikforening	18	8	4	6	48	43	+5	20
6	Boldklubben 1903	18	7	2	9	36	45	−9	16
7	Boldklubben Frem	18	6	2	10	35	40	−5	14
8	Køge BK	18	5	3	10	47	48	−1	13
9	Boldklubben af 1893	18	4	3	11	23	35	−12	11
10	Aalborg Boldspilklub	18	4	1	13	22	51	−29	9

== Results ==
Home \ Away	ABK	AaB	AGF	B93	B03	BKF	AMA	KB	KBK	ØBK
Akademisk BK	—	2–1	3–2	5–1	7–4	3–1	0–1	1–3	4–3	4–1
Aalborg BK	2–3	—	2–3	0–2	3–3	1–2	2–1	1–4	1–0	2–1
Aarhus GF	5–0	3–2	—	3–3	0–2	4–1	3–0	1–1	1–2	4–4
B.93	0–2	3–0	0–1	—	2–1	1–4	0–1	1–3	3–3	4–0
B 1903	0–4	2–0	6–2	1–0	—	3–1	0–2	1–3	3–1	1–4
BK Frem	0–6	0–1	7–3	3–1	5–0	—	0–1	2–2	5–2	1–2
Fremad Amager	5–1	3–2	2–5	2–0	0–4	1–1	—	2–2	4–1	5–2
Kjøbenhavns BK	2–4	5–0	3–3	3–0	4–0	2–1	2–4	—	3–1	3–2
Køge BK	3–4	11–0	3–4	1–1	4–2	3–1	1–0	1–4	—	4–4
Østerbros BK	2–3	3–2	2–1	2–1	3–3	4–0	4–2	5–2	4–3	—

Legend: Blue = home team win; Yellow = draw; Red = away team win.
