= David Roufpanah =

Swedish football coach (born 1987)

Personal information
- Date of birth: 17 November 1987 (age 38)
- Place of birth: Malmö, Sweden

Managerial career
- Years: Team
- 2009: Harrie-Kävlinge FF
- 2010: IF Sold
- 2011: Rågsveds IF
- 2018: FC Rosengård
- 2021–2022: IFK Kalmar
- 2023–2024: AB

David Roufpanah (born 17 November 1987) is a Swedish association football coach and motivational speaker. He has coached at several clubs across Sweden and Denmark. In 2009, he gained his first head coaching job when he accepted the position at Harrie-Kävlinge FF.

== Early life ==
Roufpanah grew up in the Lindeborg district of Malmö, Sweden. He began his coaching career as a teenager and held early coaching roles at Eriksfälts FF before progressing to youth academy positions at Malmö FF. He later studied sports psychology and sports science at Malmö University and obtained the UEFA Pro Licence in 2019, the highest level of coaching education in European football.

== Coaching career ==
Roufpanah's coaching career began at youth level with Eriksfälts FF, later known as Lindeborgs FF 1948. In 2009, he was hired as the head coach of Harrie-Kävlinge FF, who were then competing in Division 5. He has since held coaching and leadership roles across multiple levels of Swedish football, including positions at Hammarby IF, Syrianska FC, Ängelholms FF, IFK Värnamo, and Dalkurd FF in Superettan.

Roufpanah also worked at IK Sirius in the Allsvenskan as head of scouting. In 2018, he was appointed head coach of FC Rosengård and became the first coach in the club's history to guide the team to the group stage of the Swedish Cup, following a qualification victory over Landskrona BoIS. He left his position after one season for a short-term position in Spain.

In the 2022 season, Roufpanah served as head coach of IFK Kalmar in the Damallsvenskan, where he secured the club's place in the top division for the first time in its history. In 2023, Roufpanah took over Danish club Akademisk Boldklub and led the team to the quarter-finals of the 2023–24 Danish Cup for the first time in 22 years, including a victory over top-tier side Vejle in the round of 16.

== Other work ==
In addition to his coaching career, Roufpanah is active as a lecturer in leadership, motivation, and applied psychology. He was named one of Sweden's 100 most popular lecturers in 2018 and 2019 by the industry publication Eventeffect. Roufpanah has contributed articles to the health magazine SportHälsa.
