= Arne Kleven =

Danish footballer (1900–1991)

Personal information
- Full name: Arne Mozart Kleven
- Date of birth: 8 January 1900
- Place of birth: Copenhagen, Denmark
- Date of death: 19 February 1991 (aged 91)
- Position: Midfielder

Senior career*
Years	Team	Apps	(Gls)
- Akademisk Boldklub

International career
1927–1931	Denmark	2	(0)
- * Club domestic league appearances and goals

Arne Mozart Kleven (8 January 1900 – 19 February 1991) was a Danish footballer who played as a midfielder for Akademisk Boldklub. He made two appearances for the Denmark national team from 1927 to 1931.
