= Knud Bastrup-Birk =

Danish footballer (1919–1973)

Personal information
- Date of birth: 12 December 1919
- Place of birth: Copenhagen, Denmark
- Date of death: 25 August 1973 (aged 53)
- Place of death: Gentofte, Denmark
- Position: Defender

Senior career*
Years	Team	Apps	(Gls)
- AB

International career
1943–1951	Denmark	18	(0)
Medal record
Men's football
Representing Denmark
Olympic Games
Bronze medal – third place	1948 London	Team
- * Club domestic league appearances and goals

Knud Bastrup-Birk (12 December 1919 – 25 August 1973) was a Danish amateur footballer who played 18 games for the Denmark national football team.

Bastrup-Birk was born in Gentofte and played club football for Akademisk Boldklub (AB).

Bastrup-Birk was a talented boxer, a good rower, and an excellent 100 m sprinter and long jumper. He played as a full-back, but his footballing style was ahead of its time. He played almost as an attack-minded libero, dribbling and passing the ball upfield when he had dispossessed an opposing player, but the attacking fashion was criticized by the leaders of both AB and the national team. He made his international debut in 1943, but due to injury, he was an unused substitute in the Danish team that won bronze medals at the 1948 Summer Olympics. He played his last game for Denmark in 1951.

== Honours ==
Denmark

- Olympic Bronze Medal: 1948
