= Jan Larsen (footballer) =

Danish footballer (1945-1993)

Personal information
- Date of birth: 22 March 1945
- Date of death: 9 March 1993 (aged 47)
- Position: Defender

Senior career*
| Years | Team | Apps | (Gls) |
| 1966–1971 | AB | | |

International career
| 1966–1967 | Denmark U21 | 6 | (0) |
| 1968–1971 | Denmark | 29 | (0) |
- * Club domestic league appearances and goals

Jan Larsen (22 March 1945 – 9 March 1993) was a Danish association football player, who played 29 games as a defender for the Denmark national football team from 1968 to 1971. He was named 1970 Danish Football Player of the Year. During his career, he played for HB, AB, and Skovshoved IF.
