= Christen Brøgger =

Danish footballer (1925-2013)

Personal information
- Date of birth: 29 August 1925
- Place of birth: Østerbro, Denmark
- Date of death: 8 September 2013 (aged 88)
- Position: Defender

Senior career*
Years	Team	Apps	(Gls)
1945–1959	Akademisk Boldklub		

International career
1946–1951	Denmark U21	4	(0)
1953	Denmark B	1	(0)
1952–1956	Denmark	20	(0)
- * Club domestic league appearances and goals

Christen Brøgger (29 August 1925 – 8 September 2013) was a Danish footballer who played as a defender for Akademisk Boldklub. He played in 20 matches for the Denmark national team from 1952 to 1956.
