= 1952–53 Danish 1st Division =

8th season of Danish 1st Division

Danish 1st Division
- Season: 1952–53

The 1952–53 Danish 1st Division season was the 8th edition of Danish 1st Division annual football competition in Denmark. It was contested by 10 teams.

Akademisk Boldklub unsuccessfully defended its 1952 title. Kjøbenhavns Boldklub successfully pursued its 1953 title.

Statistics of Danish 1st Division in the 1952/1953 season.

== League standings ==
Pos	Team	Pld	W	D	L	GF	GA	GD	Pts
1	Kjøbenhavns Boldklub	18	14	2	2	43	25	+18	30
2	Skovshoved IF	18	9	5	4	38	24	+14	23
3	Odense Boldklub	18	7	7	4	40	29	+11	21
4	Akademisk Boldklub	18	8	4	6	38	38	0	20
5	Køge BK	18	7	4	7	51	43	+8	18
6	Boldklubben af 1893	18	7	3	8	30	32	−2	17
7	Esbjerg fB	18	6	3	9	32	37	−5	15
8	Boldklubben Frem	18	6	3	9	25	36	−11	15
9	Boldklubben 1903	18	6	0	12	26	41	−15	12
10	Boldklubben 1909	18	2	5	11	27	45	−18	9

== Results ==
Home \ Away	ABK	B93	B03	B09	EFB	BKF	KB	KBK	OB	SKO
Akademisk BK	—	1–2	3–0	4–4	2–4	3–2	1–4	4–3	1–1	3–1
B.93	2–2	—	4–1	3–2	3–0	0–3	2–5	2–2	3–1	1–1
B 1903	1–2	2–0	—	0–2	1–2	1–0	2–3	4–2	2–3	1–2
B 1909	2–1	0–3	2–3	—	1–2	0–1	0–1	2–2	1–4	1–1
Esbjerg fB	3–3	2–1	2–3	2–1	—	1–2	1–2	4–0	1–1	1–1
BK Frem	1–2	1–0	1–2	2–2	2–1	—	0–2	2–2	1–1	4–1
Kjøbenhavns BK	3–1	2–0	2–0	5–3	4–2	1–0	—	2–0	3–3	3–1
Køge BK	3–1	1–3	7–3	5–2	5–3	3–0	7–0	—	3–2	1–2
Odense BK	1–2	2–1	3–0	2–2	3–0	8–2	1–1	3–1	—	1–1
Skovshoved IF	1–2	4–0	1–0	4–0	2–1	6–1	1–0	4–4	4–0	—

Legend: Blue = home team win; Yellow = draw; Red = away team win.
