= 1949–50 Danish 1st Division =

5th season of Danish 1st Division

Danish 1st Division
- Season: 1949–50

The 1949–50 Danish 1st Division season was the 5th edition of Danish 1st Division annual football competition in Denmark. It was contested by 10 teams.

Kjøbenhavns Boldklub successfully defended its 1949 title in its successful pursuit of the 1950 title.

Statistics of Danish 1st Division in the 1949/1950 season.

== League standings ==
Pos	Team	Pld	W	D	L	GF	GA	GD	Pts
1	Kjøbenhavns Boldklub	18	12	4	2	36	11	+25	28
2	Akademisk Boldklub	18	12	3	3	48	18	+30	27
3	Aarhus Gymnastikforening	18	12	2	4	44	24	+20	26
4	Køge BK	18	9	3	6	34	29	+5	21
5	Boldklubben 1903	18	6	3	9	20	27	−7	15
6	Boldklubben Frem	18	4	7	7	21	29	−8	15
7	Odense Boldklub	18	6	2	10	33	42	−9	14
8	Boldklubben af 1893	18	5	4	9	25	41	−16	14
9	Esbjerg fB	18	5	2	11	23	37	−14	12
10	Østerbros Boldklub	18	2	4	12	16	42	−26	8

== Results ==
Home \ Away	ABK	AGF	B93	B03	EFB	BKF	KB	KBK	OB	ØBK
Akademisk BK	—	4–0	3–2	1–0	4–2	2–0	1–0	1–4	5–0	8–1
Aarhus GF	0–0	—	2–0	4–0	2–0	2–1	0–0	1–2	2–1	3–0
B.93	1–7	2–6	—	1–1	2–1	3–1	1–1	0–2	1–0	1–0
B 1903	0–4	0–3	3–1	—	0–1	2–2	0–1	2–1	1–2	1–1
Esbjerg fB	2–1	1–3	2–1	1–2	—	2–2	0–1	0–4	6–2	1–0
BK Frem	2–2	2–1	1–3	0–2	2–0	—	1–3	1–3	0–0	1–0
Kjøbenhavns BK	0–0	4–0	3–0	3–2	2–0	1–1	—	3–0	4–2	1–0
Køge BK	2–0	3–4	2–2	0–1	2–2	1–1	1–4	—	2–1	2–1
Odense BK	1–2	3–6	5–3	1–0	5–1	1–2	2–1	4–0	—	1–4
Østerbros BK	1–3	1–5	1–1	0–3	2–1	1–1	0–4	1–3	2–2	—

Legend: Blue = home team win; Yellow = draw; Red = away team win.
