= Mikkel Brund =

Danish footballer (born 2003)

Personal information
- Full name: Mikkel Brund
- Date of birth: 6 March 2003 (age 23)
- Place of birth: Hadsten, Denmark
- Height: 1.95 m (6 ft 5 in)
- Positions: Defensive midfielder; centre-back

Team information
- Current team: AB
- Number: 34

Youth career
- Hadsten SK
- Randers

Senior career*
Years	Team	Apps	(Gls)
2021–2023	Randers	1	(0)
2023–2024	Hobro IK II		
2024–	AB	51	(2)
- * Club domestic league appearances and goals as of 18 June 2026

Mikkel Brund (born 6 March 2003) is a Danish professional footballer who plays as a defensive midfielder or centre-back for the Danish 2nd Division club AB.

== Career ==
=== Randers ===
Brund joined Randers FC from the affiliate club Hadsten SK as a U-13 player. In July 2020, 17-year old Brund was on the bench against Esbjerg fB in the Danish Superliga and in the winter 2021, he began training with Randers' first team, before shortly after signing a new youth contract until June 2023.

On 7 March 2021, a day after his 18th birthday, Brund got his official debut for Randers in the Danish Superliga against Lyngby BK. Brund started on the bench, but replaced Simon Graves Jensen in the 95th minute.

Brund left Randers at the end of the 2022–23 season, as his contract expired.

=== Later clubs ===
After leaving Randers, Brund began playing for the reserve team of Hobro IK, which was competing in the In January 2024, Brund went on a trial at FC Fredericia.

On 6 February 2024 the Danish 2nd Division club Akademisk Boldklub confirmed that Brund had signed with the club. Already two months after his arrival, he signed a new contract with AB until the end of 2026. During his time at AB, Brund, who had primarily played as a centre-back, was increasingly converted into a defensive midfielder.
