= Otto Moltke =

Danish footballer (1897–1952)

Personal information
- Full name: Otto Knud Johan Axel Moltke
- Date of birth: 10 July 1897
- Place of birth: Østerbro, Denmark
- Date of death: 13 September 1952 (aged 55)
- Position: Defender

Senior career*
Years	Team	Apps	(Gls)
1914–1927	Akademisk Boldklub		

International career
1919	Denmark	1	(0)
- * Club domestic league appearances and goals

Otto Knud Johan Axel Moltke (10 July 1897 – 13 September 1952) was a Danish footballer who played as a defender. He made one appearance for the Denmark national team in 1919.
