= Tobias Lykkebak =

Danish footballer (born 2006)

Personal information
- Full name: Tobias Lykkebak
- Date of birth: 15 July 2006 (age 20)
- Place of birth: Vejle, Denmark
- Height: 1.77 m (5 ft 10 in)
- Positions: Midfielder; right winger

Team information
- Current team: AB
- Number: 28

Youth career
- –2016: Engum UI
- 2016–2025: Vejle

Senior career*
Years	Team	Apps	(Gls)
2023–2026	Vejle	1	(0)
2026–	AB	12	(1)
- * Club domestic league appearances and goals as of 18 June 2026

Tobias Lykkebak (born 15 July 2006) is a Danish professional footballer who plays as a midfielder for Danish 2nd Division club AB.

== Career ==
=== Vejle Boldklub ===
Born and raised in Engum, a neighborhood in Vejle, Lykkebak started his career at Engum UI before later, as a U10 player, moving to Vejle in 2016. Here, he worked his way up through the club's academy.

On November 1, 2023, 17-year-old Lykkebak made his official debut for Vejle when he came on from the bench in a Danish Cup match against AB. In October 2024, Lykkebak extended his contract with Vejle until June 2026.

Ahead of the 2025–26 season, Lykkebak was permanently promoted to the first-team squad. On 20 July 2025, in Vejle's first match of the Danish Superliga season, Lykkebak made his official league debut when he replaced Mike Vestergård in the 80th minute in a game against Randers FC.

=== AB ===
On 1 February 2026, Lykkebak signed with Danish 2nd Division club AB on a contract running until June 2028.
