= Flemming Christensen =

Danish footballer and manager (born 1958)

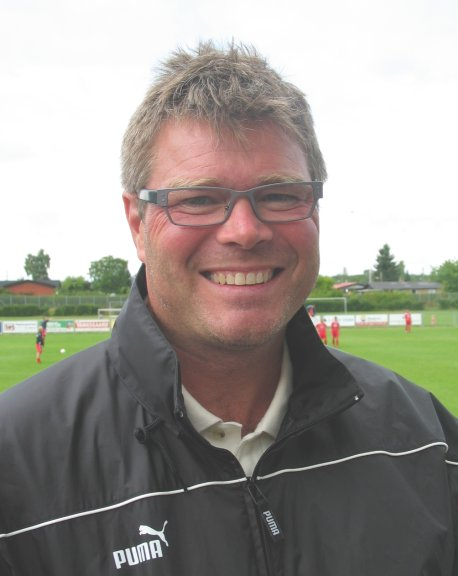

Personal information
- Date of birth: 10 April 1958 (age 68)
- Place of birth: Copenhagen, Denmark
- Height: 1.85 m (6 ft 1 in)
- Position: Striker

Senior career*
Years	Team	Apps	(Gls)
1978–1980	AB		
1980–1982	Lyngby BK		
1982–1983	Saint-Étienne	22	(1)
1983–1986	Lyngby BK		
1986–1988	Aarau	29	(4)
1988–1992	Lyngby BK	279	(162)
1992–1993	AB		

International career
1982–1989	Denmark	11	(2)

Managerial career
- 2000–2001: AB
- 2003–2005: Slagelse B&I
- 2005–2007: Næstved BK
- 2007–2010: AB
- 2011–2012: ÍF Fuglafjørður
- 2013–2014: Vard Haugesund
- 2016–2020: FC Græsrødderne
- * Club domestic league appearances and goals

Flemming Christensen (born 10 April 1958) is a Danish former professional football player and manager.

== Career ==
In his active career, Christensen played for Danish clubs AB and Lyngby BK, as well as French club AS Saint-Etienne and FC Aarau from Switzerland. He debuted for the Danish national team in 1982, and he played a total of 11 national team matches and scored 2 goals. He was selected to represent Denmark at the 1986 World Cup, but did not play any matches.

After ending his active career, he became a football manager, and among other teams managed Slagelse B&I, Næstved BK, AB, and ÍF Fuglafjørður.

== Honours ==
Lyngby

- Danish championship: 1983 and 1992
- Danish Cup: 1984, 1985 and 1990

=== Individual ===
- Effodeildin Best Coach: 2012
