= Svend Holm =

Danish footballer

Personal information
- Date of birth: 25 October 1895
- Date of death: 24 August 1985 (aged 89)

International career
Years	Team	Apps	(Gls)
1919	Denmark	1	(0)

Svend Holm (25 October 1895 – 24 August 1985) was a Danish footballer. He played in one match for the Denmark national football team in 1919.
