= Svend Ringsted =

Danish footballer (1893–1975)

Personal information
- Date of birth: 30 August 1893
- Place of birth: Qaqortoq, Greenland
- Date of death: 16 March 1975 (aged 81)
- Place of death: Hillerød, Denmark

International career
Years	Team	Apps	(Gls)
1918–1921	Denmark	5	(0)

Svend Ringsted (30 August 1893 – 16 March 1975) was a Danish footballer. He played in five matches for the Denmark national football team between 1918 and 1921.
