= Sigfred Jensen =

Danish footballer

Personal information
- Date of birth: 6 March 1909
- Date of death: 10 October 1986 (aged 77)

International career
Years	Team	Apps	(Gls)
1933–1939	Denmark	6	(0)

Sigfred Jensen (6 March 1909 – 10 October 1986) was a Danish footballer. He played in six matches for the Denmark national football team from 1933 to 1939.
