= Johnny Petersen =

Danish football manager and former player (born 1947)

Personal information
- Date of birth: 27 November 1947 (age 78)
- Place of birth: Denmark
- Position: Midfielder

Senior career*
Years	Team	Apps	(Gls)
- Akademisk Boldklub
1974–1976	FC St. Pauli	51	(5)
- B 93

International career
1970	Denmark u-21	3	(0)
1970	Denmark	3	(0)

Managerial career
- 1981–1983: Ballerup IF
- 1984: Hellerup IK
- 1986–1989: Brønshøj BK
- 1990–1991: Helsingør IF
- 1991–1992: B 93
- 1993–1995: AB
- 1995–1997: B 93
- 1997–2001: BK Frem
- 2002–2004: Herfølge BK
- 2004–2006: FC Nordsjælland
- 2007: Akademisk Boldklub
- * Club domestic league appearances and goals

Johnny Petersen (born 27 November 1947) is a Danish football manager and former player who most recently was caretaker manager of Akademisk Boldklub. As a player, he represented Akademisk Boldklub and B 93 in his native country and FC St. Pauli in Germany. He played three games for the Denmark national team. As a coach, he most notably coached Herfølge BK and FC Nordsjælland in the Danish Superliga.
