= 1953–54 Danish 1st Division =

9th season of Danish 1st Division

Danish 1st Division
- Season: 1953–54

The 1953–54 Danish 1st Division season was the 9th edition of Danish 1st Division annual football competition in Denmark. It was contested by 10 teams.

Kjøbenhavns Boldklub unsuccessfully defended its 1953 title. Køge BK successfully pursued its 1954 title.

Statistics of Danish 1st Division in the 1953/1954 season.

== League standings ==
Pos	Team	Pld	W	D	L	GF	GA	GD	Pts
1	Køge BK	18	10	3	5	45	34	+11	23
2	Kjøbenhavns Boldklub	18	7	6	5	27	24	+3	20
3	Akademisk Boldklub	18	8	3	7	30	22	+8	19
4	Boldklubben Frem	18	6	6	6	29	29	0	18
5	Skovshoved IF	18	7	4	7	30	31	−1	18
6	Odense Boldklub	18	7	4	7	33	37	−4	18
7	Aarhus Gymnastikforening	18	7	3	8	31	31	0	17
8	Boldklubben 1903	18	5	6	7	25	28	−3	16
9	Esbjerg fB	18	6	4	8	26	35	−9	16
10	Boldklubben af 1893	18	5	5	8	27	32	−5	15

== Results ==
Home \ Away	ABK	AGF	B93	B03	EFB	BKF	KB	KBK	OB	SKO
Akademisk BK	—	2–0	0–1	1–2	3–0	3–3	0–1	1–2	1–3	2–1
Aarhus GF	0–1	—	4–2	2–2	1–2	2–0	0–2	0–2	3–1	1–1
B.93	0–5	1–1	—	0–2	2–0	2–1	2–2	2–3	3–1	3–3
B 1903	3–2	1–4	1–1	—	1–1	0–0	1–3	0–2	3–1	1–1
Esbjerg fB	2–2	0–2	1–4	2–1	—	2–2	1–0	2–5	0–2	4–1
BK Frem	2–3	2–1	2–1	1–4	1–1	—	3–3	2–0	1–1	2–3
Kjøbenhavns BK	1–1	0–3	2–1	1–0	4–2	1–3	—	2–2	1–1	2–3
Køge BK	1–0	8–4	0–0	3–1	1–3	1–0	0–0	—	8–2	1–4
Odense BK	0–2	3–1	3–2	1–1	1–3	1–2	1–0	7–3	—	1–0
Skovshoved IF	0–1	1–2	1–0	2–1	2–0	0–2	0–2	4–3	3–3	—

Legend: Blue = home team win; Yellow = draw; Red = away team win.
