= Hartvig Møller =

Danish footballer (1924-2005)

Personal information
- Date of birth: 27 March 1924
- Place of birth: Hanstholm, Denmark
- Date of death: 19 February 2005 (aged 80)
- Position: Midfielder

International career
Years	Team	Apps	(Gls)
1949	Denmark	1	(0)

Hartvig Møller (27 March 1924 – 19 February 2005) was a Danish footballer. He played in one match for the Denmark national football team in 1949.
