= Palle Christensen =

Danish footballer (1902–1995)

Personal information
- Date of birth: 27 December 1902
- Place of birth: Copenhagen, Denmark
- Date of death: 13 August 1995 (aged 92)
- Position: Defender

International career
Years	Team	Apps	(Gls)
1926–1928	Denmark	8	(0)

Palle Christensen (27 December 1902 – 13 August 1995) was a Danish footballer. He played in eight matches for the Denmark national football team from 1926 to 1928.
