= Svend Knudsen =

Danish footballer

Personal information
- Date of birth: 18 January 1896
- Date of death: 28 January 1989 (aged 93)

International career
| Years | Team | Apps | (Gls) |
| 1918–1919 | Denmark | 6 | (0) |

Svend Knudsen (18 January 1896 – 28 January 1989) was a Danish footballer. He played in six matches for the Denmark national football team from 1918 to 1919.
