= 1948–49 Danish 1st Division =

4th season of Danish 1st Division

Danish 1st Division
- Season: 1948–49

The 1948–49 Danish 1st Division season was the 4th edition of Danish 1st Division annual football competition in Denmark. It was contested by 10 teams.

Kjøbenhavns Boldklub successfully defended its 1948 title in its successive pursuit of the 1949 title.

Statistics of Danish 1st Division in the 1948/1949 season.

== League standings ==
Pos	Team	Pld	W	D	L	GF	GA	GD	Pts
1	Kjøbenhavns Boldklub	18	12	3	3	37	17	+20	27
2	Akademisk Boldklub	18	9	4	5	46	32	+14	22
3	Aarhus Gymnastikforening	18	8	3	7	36	31	+5	19
4	Køge BK	18	8	3	7	37	34	+3	19
5	Odense Boldklub	18	9	1	8	49	51	−2	19
6	Boldklubben 1903	18	7	4	7	32	29	+3	18
7	Østerbros Boldklub	18	7	4	7	34	39	−5	18
8	Boldklubben Frem	18	8	1	9	32	35	−3	17
9	Boldklubben af 1893	18	3	6	9	20	31	−11	12
10	Boldklubben 1909	18	3	3	12	18	42	−24	9

== Results ==
Home \ Away	ABK	AGF	B93	B03	B09	BKF	KB	KBK	OB	ØBK
Akademisk BK	—	5–1	3–1	2–0	4–0	3–2	1–1	0–4	2–3	0–0
Aarhus GF	0–0	—	1–1	1–2	3–1	2–0	1–0	6–1	3–1	5–1
B.93	1–4	2–2	—	0–0	0–1	2–1	0–1	1–4	1–2	1–1
B 1903	3–1	2–3	1–4	—	4–0	3–0	2–1	1–1	4–3	0–1
B 1909	1–3	2–1	3–1	2–2	—	1–2	0–2	1–4	0–4	0–3
BK Frem	3–1	4–0	2–0	0–2	2–2	—	1–3	3–1	1–4	1–4
Kjøbenhavns BK	2–2	2–0	0–0	2–1	2–1	3–0	—	3–0	3–2	2–1
Køge BK	3–1	1–4	1–2	2–1	0–0	2–4	2–1	—	5–0	2–1
Odense BK	5–6	3–1	3–2	3–3	3–2	1–3	2–6	3–2	—	4–2
Østerbros BK	2–8	3–2	1–1	3–1	2–1	1–3	1–3	2–2	5–3	—

Legend: Blue = home team win; Yellow = draw; Red = away team win.
