= Peter Rasmussen (footballer, born 1969) =

Danish footballer (born 1969)

Personal information
- Full name: Peter Rasmussen
- Date of birth: 2 March 1969 (age 57)
- Place of birth: Hillerød, Denmark
- Height: 1.82 m (6 ft 0 in)
- Position: Midfielder

Senior career*
Years	Team	Apps	(Gls)
1988–2001	AB		
- * Club domestic league appearances and goals

Peter Rasmussen (born 2 March 1969) is a Danish retired professional football player in the midfielder position. He spent his entire 13-year career with Akademisk Boldklub (AB), winning the 1999 Danish Cup with the team. Rasmussen played 141 games and scored 15 goals in the Danish Superliga championship from 1996 to 2000.

== Honours ==
Akademisk Boldklub

- Danish Cup: 1998–99
