= Willy Larsson =

Danish footballer

Personal information
- Date of birth: 30 October 1914
- Date of death: 23 August 2000 (aged 85)

International career
Years	Team	Apps	(Gls)
1939	Denmark	6	(0)

Willy Larsson (30 October 1914 – 23 August 2000) was a Danish footballer. He played in six matches for the Denmark national football team in 1939.
