= 1967 Danish 1st Division =

22nd season of Danish 1st Division

Danish 1st Division
- Season: 1967

The 1967 Danish 1st Division season was the 22nd season of the Danish 1st Division league championship, governed by the Danish Football Association.

It was contested by 12 teams, and Akademisk Boldklub won the championship.

== Table ==
Pos	Team	Pld	W	D	L	GF	GA	GD	Pts
1	Akademisk Boldklub	22	14	3	5	42	28	+14	31
2	Boldklubben Frem	22	12	5	5	43	24	+19	29
3	Horsens fS	22	11	6	5	36	44	−8	28
4	Hvidovre IF	22	9	9	4	32	18	+14	27
5	Aalborg Boldspilklub	22	7	9	6	38	36	+2	23
6	Esbjerg fB	22	9	4	9	32	36	−4	22
7	Kjøbenhavns Boldklub	22	7	7	8	34	30	+4	21
8	Vejle Boldklub	22	9	3	10	44	40	+4	21
9	Odense Boldklub	22	4	9	9	23	41	−18	17
10	Aarhus Gymnastikforening	22	6	4	12	36	44	−8	16
11	Boldklubben 1903	22	5	5	12	35	41	−6	15
12	Køge BK	22	4	6	12	30	43	−13	14

== Results ==
Home \ Away	ABK	AaB	AGF	B03	EFB	BKF	HOR	HIF	KB	KBK	OB	VBK
Akademisk BK	—	3–1	4–0	1–0	0–2	1–0	6–0	1–0	4–3	1–0	0–0	2–1
Aalborg BK	5–0	—	1–4	1–0	0–1	1–3	1–1	1–4	2–1	0–0	1–1	3–2
Aarhus GF	1–2	3–4	—	2–2	1–2	1–2	2–0	2–1	2–1	0–1	0–2	1–3
B 1903	3–1	1–4	2–3	—	1–2	1–3	7–0	1–4	2–2	1–1	1–1	3–1
Esbjerg fB	1–1	4–3	0–0	0–2	—	1–1	3–1	0–3	0–2	3–1	3–1	0–2
BK Frem	2–3	1–1	3–1	3–2	2–0	—	0–1	0–1	1–1	3–0	4–2	4–2
Horsens fS	3–2	1–1	2–2	2–0	3–1	2–2	—	2–1	1–0	2–1	2–0	1–6
Hvidovre IF	0–0	1–1	5–1	1–0	2–0	1–0	1–1	—	1–1	1–1	0–0	1–3
Kjøbenhavns BK	0–1	2–2	2–1	0–0	3–1	2–2	3–4	1–2	—	4–1	1–2	1–0
Køge BK	3–5	1–1	3–1	1–2	1–4	0–3	1–2	1–1	1–2	—	5–1	1–3
Odense BK	0–2	1–1	0–6	4–2	3–3	0–2	0–0	1–1	0–2	2–2	—	2–1
Vejle BK	3–2	1–3	2–2	4–2	3–1	0–2	4–5	0–0	0–0	1–4	2–0	—

Legend: Blue = home team win; Yellow = draw; Red = away team win.
