= Kaj Jørgensen =

Danish footballer (1925-2001)

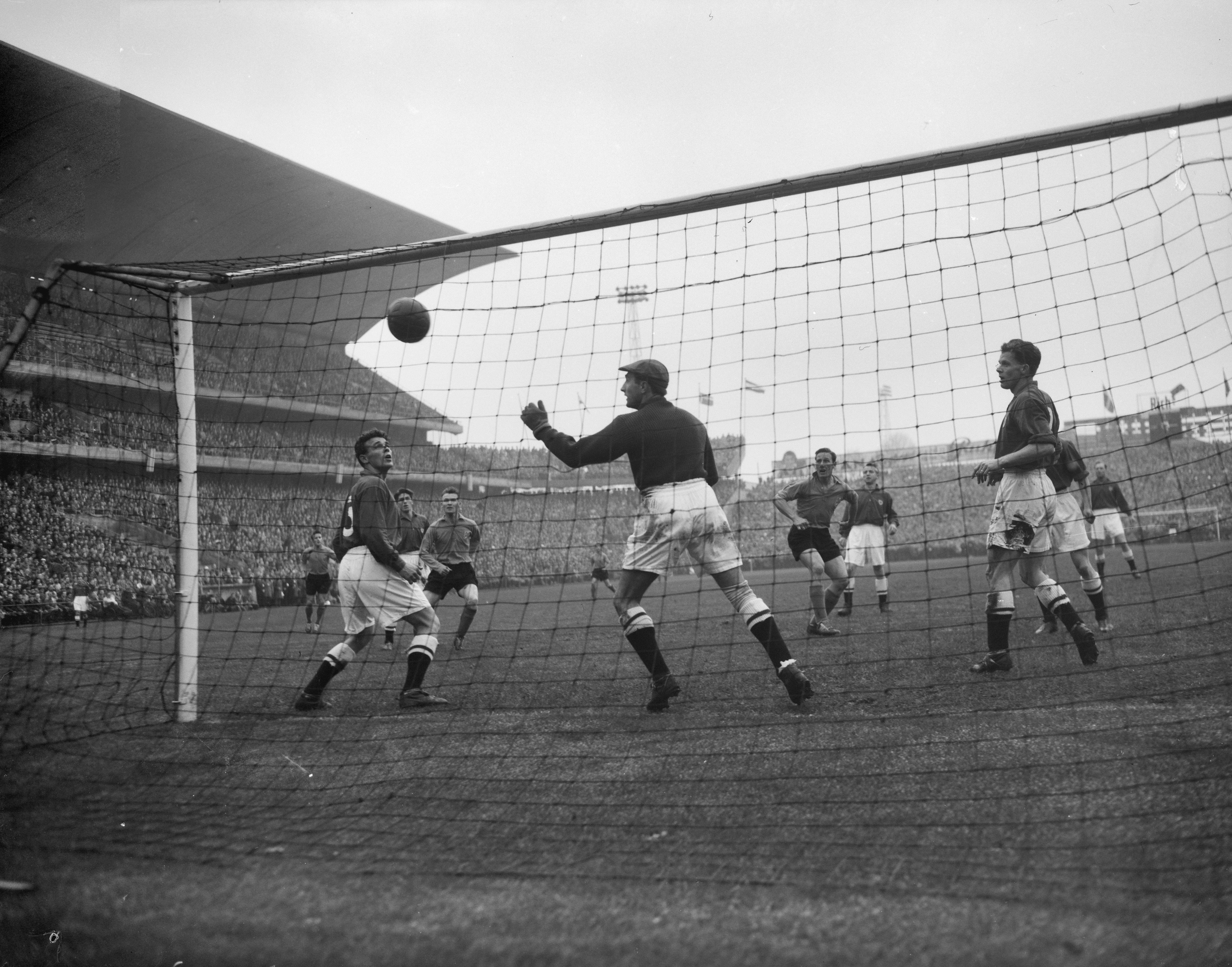
- Jørgensen (1956)

Personal information
- Date of birth: 11 October 1925
- Date of death: 11 March 2001 (aged 75)

International career
Years	Team	Apps	(Gls)
1950–1956	Denmark	11	(0)

Kaj Jørgensen (11 October 1925 – 11 March 2001) was a Danish footballer. He played in eleven matches for the Denmark national football team from 1950 to 1956.
