= Henrik Bernburg =

Danish footballer (born 1947)

Personal information
- Full name: Henik Claus Busch Bernburg
- Date of birth: 9 April 1947 (age 79)
- Place of birth: Virum, Denmark
- Position: Midfielder

International career
Years	Team	Apps	(Gls)
1968–1970	Denmark	2	(0)

Henrik Bernburg (born 9 April 1947) is a Danish footballer. He played in two matches for the Denmark national football team from 1968 to 1970.
