= 1954–55 Danish 1st Division =

10th season of Danish 1st Division

Danish 1st Division
- Season: 1954–55

The 1954–55 Danish 1st Division season was the 10th edition of Danish 1st Division annual football competition in Denmark. It was contested by 10 teams.

Køge BK unsuccessfully defended its 1954 title. Aarhus Gymnastikforening successfully pursued its 1955 title.

Statistics of Danish 1st Division in the 1954/1955 season.

== League standings ==
Pos	Team	Pld	W	D	L	GF	GA	GD	Pts	Qualification or relegation
1	Aarhus Gymnastikforening (C)	18	12	1	5	38	24	+14	25	Qualification for the European Cup first round
2	Akademisk Boldklub	18	10	3	5	42	28	+14	23	
3	Boldklubben Frem	18	8	5	5	34	27	+7	21	
4	Kjøbenhavns Boldklub	18	6	6	6	31	27	+4	18	
5	Esbjerg fB	18	7	4	7	38	37	+1	18	
6	Køge BK	18	6	5	7	32	37	−5	17	
7	Boldklubben 1909	18	6	4	8	28	33	−5	16	
8	Boldklubben 1903	18	6	3	9	21	28	−7	15	
9	Skovshoved IF	18	4	6	8	26	37	−11	14	
10	Odense Boldklub	18	6	1	11	30	42	−12	13	

(C) Champions

== Results ==
Home \ Away	AB	AGF	B03	B09	EFB	BKF	KB	KBK	OB	SKO
Akademisk BK	—	1–3	1–2	4–2	2–1	0–0	1–3	3–2	2–1	7–2
Aarhus GF	4–3	—	3–0	1–0	6–2	2–1	1–1	2–3	4–1	1–3
B 1903	2–2	0–2	—	1–2	2–3	2–4	0–3	0–1	1–0	2–0
B 1909	0–3	3–0	3–2	—	2–2	2–4	1–3	2–2	1–1	5–2
Esbjerg fB	3–2	1–2	1–2	1–0	—	3–1	1–0	3–4	3–4	1–1
BK Frem	0–1	1–2	0–0	1–0	3–3	—	0–4	3–1	5–1	3–1
Kjøbenhavns BK	2–2	0–1	1–1	1–2	2–1	1–1	—	2–5	2–4	1–2
Køge BK	1–2	1–0	0–2	1–1	1–2	2–4	1–1	—	2–1	2–2
Odense BK	0–3	0–2	2–1	4–1	1–5	1–2	2–3	5–1	—	1–4
Skovshoved IF	0–3	3–2	0–1	0–1	2–2	1–1	1–1	2–2	0–1	—

Legend: Blue = home team win; Yellow = draw; Red = away team win.
