= 1888 Medal Football Competition =

Tournament details
- Country: Denmark
- Teams: 6

Final positions
- Champions: Kjøbenhavns Boldklub (1st title)
- Runners-up: BK Haabet

Tournament statistics
- Matches played: 13
- Goals scored: 96 (7.38 per match)

The 1888 Medaille Football Competition (Danish: Medaille Fodbold-Konkurrencen i 1888) was a football tournament for Danish clubs that was held in Copenhagen. It was the first football championship in Denmark and Scandinavia and it was the forerunner for Fodboldturneringen which began in the following year, in 1889. Until that point, the then existing clubs in Denmark had been limited to playing friendly games only.

The tournament had the participation of 15 club teams, who played a cup tournament for a set of silver medals for the winners and bronze medals for the losing finalists. The tournament was organized on the initiative of Kjøbenhavns Boldklub (KB), which paid a significant amount of the total expenses of the tournament.

The first match was played on 5 February 1888, where Boldklubben Haabet defeated Boldklubben Pollux 2–0, and the tournament ended on 29 April 1888, when Boldklub defeated Haabet 14–0 in the final, thus winning the cup comfortably, scoring 40 goals in total and not conceding a single goal.

== Overview ==
It was organized by the far leading club of the time, KB, who wanted to build and set up a system for the growing number of matches between an increasing number of clubs. The tournament was attended by 15 clubs and bore the official name Meda Fodbold-Konkurrencen i 1888. KB's dominance and undisputed status as Denmark's best football club were reflected in the fact that the club paid a significant part of the total expenses for the completion of the tournament, contributing with 20 Danish krone to the tournament expenses, while the other clubs only paid 3.50 DKK each.

The tournament structure itself was copied from the traditional cup from England, where the FA Cup already had 16 years of history, having had its first tournament played in 1871–72. The participants were well-known clubs such as the organizers from KB, BK Frem and Fredericia Studenternes Boldklub (now AB), but also more exotic and smaller ball clubs such as Fulvia, Kometen, and Apollo took part in the tournament.

The historic tournament began on 5 February 1888, with a match between Boldklubben Haabet and Boldklubben Pollux, with the former winning 2–0. The first goal of the match was scored by ″Mr. Frederiksen″, who has thus gone down in Danish football history as the first goalscorer in an actual tournament; while the second goal was netted by ″Mr. Sivertsen". Haabet built up on this win and even went all the way to the final, where the clear superiority of KB was too great for them to handle. On 29 April 1888, KB won the final with a resounding 14–0 victory, and the club's sovereignty was underlined by the fact that the club scored 40 goals in the four games they played and did not concede a single goal.

The 1888 Medaille Football Competition was a great success and a catalyst for the further development of football in Denmark was, among other things, emphasized by the fact that the matches were attended by an ever-increasing number of spectators, which certainly helped to pique the royal curiosity. Thus, it was reported that the match in the 2nd round between KB and Fredericia Studenternes Boldklub, played at Blegdamsfælleden, was attended by 17-year-old Prince Christian (later King Christian X of Denmark) and 15-year-old Prince Carl (later King Haakon VII of Norway).

== Results ==
Date	Match	Result	Half-time
First Round
	Fredericianerne – Fulvia	6–1	
5 February	Haabet – Pollux	2–0	
	Hebe – Clythia	4–1	
	Frem – Kometen	2–0	
	ØB – FB	2–0	
	KB – Apollo	11–0	7-0
26 February	MB – Kvik	22–0	
Quarter-finals
	MB – ØB	2–0	
	Haabet – Hebe	4–1	
13 April	KB – Fredericianerne	9–0	
	Frem – Pilen	w.o.	
Semi-finals
	KB – MB	6–0	
	Haabet – Frem	3–0	
Finale
29 April	KB – Haabet	14–0	6-0

== Legacy ==
The 1888 Medaille Football Competition was the first national football tournament played in Denmark, and its success led to the organization of the first edition of the Fodboldturneringen the following year, which has since then, become the Danish Superliga.
