= Danish 1st Division =

Association football league

Danmarksturneringens 1. division
- Organising body: Divisionsforeningen
- Founded: 1945
- Country: Denmark
- Confederation: UEFA
- Number of clubs: 12 (since 2012–13)
- Level on pyramid: 2
- Promotion to: Superliga
- Relegation to: 2nd Division
- Domestic cup: Danish Cup
- Current champions: Lyngby (2025–26)
- Broadcaster: Viaplay
- Website: 1-division.dk
- Current: 2026–27 Danish 1st Division

The 1st Division (1. Division) is the second-highest football league in Denmark, also known as Betinia LIGA for sponsorship reasons. From 1945 to 1991, the 1. Division was the name of the highest level of football in Denmark. With the formation of the Danish Superliga, the 1st Division became the second tier of Danish football. While all the teams in the Superliga are full-time professional the 1. Division has a mixture of full-time professional and semi-professional teams.

The top-ranking teams each year win promotion to the Superliga, while the bottom finishers get relegated to the Danish 2nd Division.

Viaplay broadcasts all matches from the league.

== History ==
After World War II the format of the top-flight football division in Denmark, Mesterskabsspillet (the "Championship League"), was renamed the "1st Division". There were 10 teams in the top division once again, playing each other twice, with the lowest team being relegated. The 1953–54 season saw the first non-Copenhagen team win the Danish championship, when Køge Boldklub won the title. The championship title was not reclaimed by a Copenhagen team in more than ten years, until Akademisk Boldklub (AB) won the 1967 season.

From 1958, the Danish championship was arranged through one calendar year, and the 1956–57 season lasted 18 months with the teams playing each other thrice for a 27 games total. From 1958 to 1974, the tournament was expanded to 12 teams, playing each other twice for 22 games per season each, but now the bottom two teams faced relegation. The number of teams was increased to 16 for the 1975 season, which resulted in 30 games per season. In 1986, the number of participants was altered once more, this time decreasing the number of teams to 14, and the number of games to 26.

In 1991, the Danish Superliga was created. This meant the 1st Division became the second-highest league. Together with the Superliga introduction the best Danish leagues changed back to autumn-spring seasons.

In 1996, the 1st Division had its first name sponsor, as the league received the official name "Faxe Kondi Divisionen" after main sponsor Faxe Brewery. The sponsor deal ended in 2001, but from 2004 to mid-2007 it was named "Viasat Sport Divisionen". The "Sport" was omitted upon the closing of the Viasat Sport-channels in Denmark, and the opening of TV 2 Sport. The sponsorship finally ended prior to the start of the 2010–11 season.

=== Logos ===
Former 1st Division logos:

Viasat Divisionen
(2007/08–2008/09)
Sponsor: Viasat

1. Division
(01.07–31.12.2011)
No league sponsor

Betsafe Liga
(01.01.2012–19.02.2013)
Sponsor: Betsafe/Betsson

NordicBet Liga
(19.02.2013–31.12.2014)
Sponsor: NordicBet/Betsson

1. Division
(01.01–30.06.2015)
No league sponsor

Bet25 Liga
(2015/16–season)
Sponsor: Bet25

1. Division
(01.07.2016–02.03.2017)
No league sponsor

NordicBet Liga
(03.03.2017–30.06.2022)
Sponsor: NordicBet/Betsson

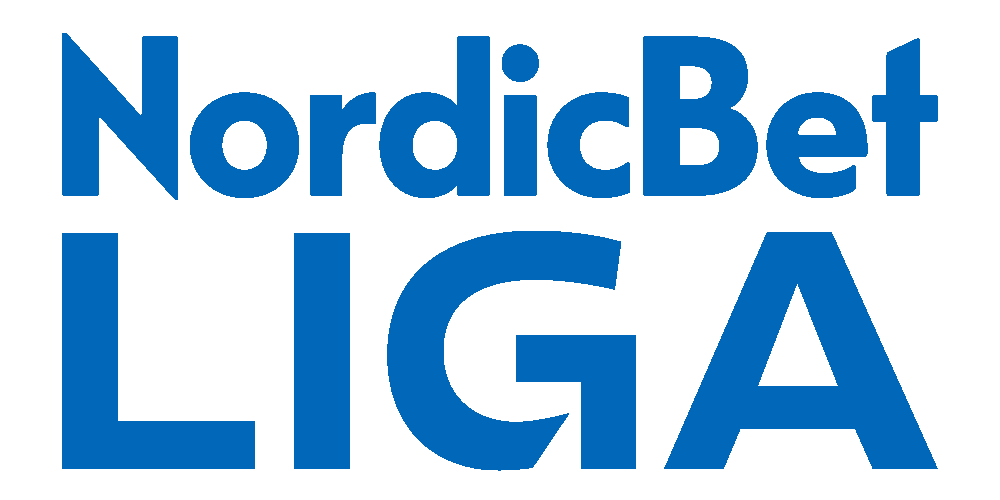
NordicBet Liga
(01.07.2022–30.06.2025)
Sponsor:NordicBet/Betsson

Betinia LIGA
(01.07.2025–present)
Sponsor: Soft2bet

== Current teams (2026–27) ==
Locations of the 2026–27 Danish 1st Division teams.

Club	Finishing position last season	First season of current spell in 1st Division
AB	1st in 2nd Division	2026–27
AaB	7th	2025–26
Aarhus Fremad	8th	2025–26
Esbjerg fB	3rd	2024–25
FC Fredericia	11th in Superliga	2026–27
HB Køge	10th	2012–13
Hillerød	4th	2022–23
Hobro IK	9th	2020–21
Hvidovre IF	5th	2024–25
Kolding IF	6th	2023–24
Vejle	12th in Superliga	2026–27
Vendsyssel FF	2nd in 2nd Division	2026–27

== Seasons ==
=== Results as first-tier league (1945–1990) ===
From 1945 to 1991, 1st Division was the top league of Danish football until the creation of the Danish Superliga.

Season	Winner
1945–46	B.93 (1)
1946–47	AB (1)
1947–48	KB (1)
1948–49	KB (2)
1949–50	KB (3)
1950–51	AB (2)
1951–52	AB (3)
1952–53	KB (4)
1953–54	Køge BK (1)
1954–55	AGF (1)
1955–56	AGF (2)
1956–57	AGF (3)
1958	Vejle Boldklub (1)
1959	B1909 (1)
1960	AGF (4)
1961	Esbjerg fB (1)
1962	Esbjerg fB (2)
1963	Esbjerg fB (3)
1964	B1909 (2)
1965	Esbjerg fB (4)
1966	Hvidovre IF (1)
1967	AB (4)
1968	KB (5)
1969	B1903 (1)
1970	B1903 (2)
1971	Vejle Boldklub (2)
1972	Vejle Boldklub (3)
1973	Hvidovre IF (2)
1974	KB (6)
1975	Køge BK (2)
1976	B1903 (3)
1977	OB (1)
1978	Vejle Boldklub (4)
1979	Esbjerg fB (5)
1980	KB (7)
1981	Hvidovre IF (3)
1982	OB (2)
1983	Lyngby Boldklub (1)
1984	Vejle Boldklub (5)
1985	Brøndby IF (1)
1986	AGF (5)
1987	Brøndby IF (2)
1988	Brøndby IF (3)
1989	OB (3)
1990	Brøndby IF (4)

=== Results as second-tier league (1990–) ===
After 1990, 1st Division became the second-tier league of Danish football after the creation of Danish Superliga.

Season	Promoted	Relegated
1991	Næstved IF (1)	
Autumn 1991	Viborg FF (1)	
Spring 1992	Brønshøj BK (1)	
Autumn 1992	Esbjerg fB (1)	
Spring 1993	Horsens fS (1)	
Autumn 1993	Vejle Boldklub (1)	
Spring 1994	B93 (1)	
Autumn 1994	Viborg FF (2)	
Spring 1995	Esbjerg fB (2)	
1995–96	Champion: Hvidovre IF (1); Runner-up: AB Copenhagen	Holstebro BK; Hellerup IK; B 1909; Nørre Aaby BK
1996–97	Champion: Ikast FS (1); Runner-up: Aarhus Fremad	FC Fredericia; Brønshøj BK; Haderslev FK; BK Avarta
1997–98	Champion: Viborg FF (3); Runner-up: B93	RB 1906; Aalborg Chang; B 1913; Ølstykke FC
1998–99	Champion: OB (1); Runner-up: Esbjerg fB	Glostrup IF 32; Holstebro BK; Næstved IF; Brønshøj BK
1999–2000	Champion: FC Midtjylland (1); Runner-up: Haderslev FK	Dalum IF; Svendborg fB; FC Fredericia; B 1909
2000–01	Champion: Esbjerg fB (3); Runner-up: Vejle BK	BK Fremad Amager; Ølstykke FC; Birkerød IF Skjold
2001–02	Champion: Køge BK (1); Runner-up: Farum BK	Kolding IF; Skive IK
2002–03	Herfølge BK (1); BK Frem	Hvidovre IF; B 1909; Hellerup IK
2003–04	Champion: Silkeborg IF (1); Runner-up: Randers FC	Brønshøj BK; FC Aarhus; B 1913
2004–05	Champion: SønderjyskE (1); Runner-up: AC Horsens	Dalum IF; Næstved BK; B 93
2005–06	Champion: Vejle Boldklub (2); Runner-up: Randers	LFA; BK Skjold; Brønshøj
2006–07	Champion: Lyngby BK (1); Runner-up: Aarhus GF	Brabrand IF; Thisted FC; BK Fremad Amager
2007–08	Champion: Vejle Boldklub (3); Runner-up: SønderjyskE	HIK; Aarhus Fremad; Ølstykke FC
2008–09	Champion: Herfølge BK (2); Runner-up: Silkeborg IF	LFA; Amager (bankruptcy, to Copenhagen Series); Køge BK (bankruptcy, to Zealand Series)
2009–10	Champion: AC Horsens (2); Runner-up: Lyngby BK	Thisted FC; Frem; Brabrand
2010–11	Champion: AGF (1); Runner-up: HB Køge	Fyn; Hvidovre IF; Kolding FC (to Denmark Series)
2011–12	Champion: Esbjerg fB (4); Runner-up: Randers FC	FC Roskilde; Næstved BK; Blokhus
2012–13	Champion: Viborg FF (4); Runner-up: Vestsjælland	Skive IK; FC Fyn
2013–14	Champion: Silkeborg IF (2); Runner-up: Hobro IK	Hvidovre IF; BK Marienlyst
2014–15	Champion: Viborg FF (5); Runner-up: AGF	AB Gladsaxe; Brønshøj Boldklub
2015–16	Champion: Lyngby BK (2); Runner-up: Silkeborg IF; Third place: AC Horsens	FC Vestsjælland
2016–17	Champion: Hobro IK (1); FC Helsingør	Næstved; Akademisk Boldklub
2017–18	Champion: Vejle Boldklub (4); Runner-up: Esbjerg fB; Third place: Vendsyssel FF	Brabrand IF; Skive IK
2018–19	Champion: Silkeborg IF (3); Lyngby Boldklub	FC Helsingør; Thisted FC
2019–20	Champion: Vejle Boldklub (5)	Nykøbing FC; FC Roskilde; Næstved Boldklub
2020–21	Champion: Viborg FF (6); Runner-up: Silkeborg IF	Kolding IF; Skive IK
2021–22	Champion: AC Horsens (3); Runner-up: Lyngby Boldklub	Jammerbugt FC; Esbjerg fB
2022–23	Champion: Vejle Boldklub (6); Runner-up: Hvidovre IF	Fremad Amager; Nykøbing FC
2023–24	Champion: SønderjyskE (2); Runner-up: AaB Fodbold	Næstved; FC Helsingør
2024–25	Champion: OB (2); Runner-up: FC Fredericia	FC Roskilde; Vendsyssel FF
2025–26	Champion: Lyngby BK (3); Runner-up: AC Horsens	B.93; Middelfart BK
