= Christian Andersen (footballer) =

Danish footballer and manager (born 1944)

Personal information
- Full name: Christian Andersen
- Date of birth: 28 September 1944 (age 82)
- Place of birth: Copenhagen, Denmark
- Position: Defender

Senior career*
Years	Team	Apps	(Gls)
1963–1970	B 1903		
1970–1972	Union St. Gilloise	59	(13)
1972–1975	Crossing Schaerbeek		
1975–1976	Cercle Brugge	5	(0)
1976–1977	FC Lorient	34	(1)
1977–1979	AB		
1980–1981	Gladsaxe-Hero BK		

International career
1965	Denmark u21	1	(0)
1969	Denmark	2	(0)

Managerial career
- 1978–1983: AB
- 1983–1984: Glostrup IC
- 1985–1986: AB
- 1995–1998: AB
- 1999: FC Copenhagen
- 1999–2000: B93
- 2001–2004: Farum BK/FC Nordsjælland
- 2005–2007: AB
- 2009–2010: BK Frem
- * Club domestic league appearances and goals

Christian Andersen (born 28 September 1944) is a Danish former football player and former manager. He was most recently the manager of Boldklubben Frem

== Playing career ==
=== Club ===
As player he played for B 1903, Cercle Brugge, FC Lorient and Akademisk Boldklub.

=== International ===
Andersen made his debut for Denmark in a May 1969 friendly match against Mexico and earned a total of 2 caps, scoring no goals. His second and final international was three weeks later, a World Cup qualification match against Ireland.

== Managerial career ==
As manager he has managed Akademisk Boldklub a couple of times, but he is most famous for his controversies with FC Copenhagen chairman Flemming Østergaard and former chairman of Akademisk Boldklub, Per Frimann. The first controversy was about Andersen being fired as manager of FC Copenhagen after only one match, and the other because Andersen in his autobiography called Frimann the reason why AB had had economic problems. Frimann began talking about a possible lawsuit, but this was solved, when Andersen made a public apology.
