= 1951–52 Danish 1st Division =

7th season of Danish 1st Division

Danish 1st Division
- Season: 1951–52

The 1951–52 Danish 1st Division season was the 7th edition of Danish 1st Division annual football competition in Denmark. It was contested by 10 teams.

Akademisk Boldklub successfully defended its 1952 title.

Statistics of Danish 1st Division in the 1951/1952 season.

== League standings ==
Pos	Team	Pld	W	D	L	GF	GA	GD	Pts
1	Akademisk Boldklub	18	11	4	3	40	21	+19	26
2	Køge BK	18	10	1	7	40	33	+7	21
3	Boldklubben 1909	18	9	2	7	34	28	+6	20
4	Odense Boldklub	18	8	4	6	29	29	0	20
5	Skovshoved IF	18	7	4	7	36	34	+2	18
6	Boldklubben af 1893	18	7	3	8	18	24	−6	17
7	Boldklubben Frem	18	6	4	8	20	23	−3	16
8	Boldklubben 1903	18	6	4	8	26	34	−8	16
9	Esbjerg fB	18	6	2	10	34	46	−12	14
10	Aarhus Gymnastikforening	18	4	4	10	22	27	−5	12

== Results ==
Home \ Away	ABK	AGF	B93	B03	B09	EFB	BKF	KBK	OB	SKO
Akademisk BK	—	2–1	2–2	1–1	3–0	1–3	2–0	4–0	4–1	1–0
Aarhus GF	2–1	—	0–1	3–0	2–0	1–3	2–4	0–1	1–1	2–2
B.93	1–3	1–0	—	0–0	1–3	0–1	1–0	1–2	0–2	1–4
B 1903	2–4	4–2	0–1	—	1–3	3–3	0–1	0–2	1–0	2–1
B 1909	1–3	2–1	1–0	2–3	—	2–2	0–2	3–2	1–2	1–2
Esbjerg fB	1–3	1–3	1–3	3–1	2–5	—	0–1	2–4	4–3	3–4
BK Frem	0–0	0–0	1–1	0–2	0–3	3–0	—	0–2	1–2	0–1
Køge BK	2–2	2–1	0–1	5–3	2–4	3–0	2–3	—	1–3	5–2
Odense BK	1–3	1–0	2–0	3–3	0–0	3–0	2–1	1–4	—	0–0
Skovshoved IF	3–2	1–1	2–3	0–1	0–3	3–5	3–3	3–1	5–2	—

Legend: Blue = home team win; Yellow = draw; Red = away team win.
