= 1964 Danish Cup final =

- Event: 1963–64 Danish Cup
Esbjerg fB	Odense KFUM
1D	2D
2	1
- Date: 7 May 1964
- Venue: Københavns Idrætspark, Copenhagen, Denmark
- Man of the Match: Carl Bertelsen (Esbjerg fB)
- Referee: Carl W. Hansen (Slagelse)
- Attendance: 24,500
- Weather: ~16 °C, sunny

The 1964 Danish Cup final (Danish: DBUs Landspokalfinale 1964) was a men's association football match between Esbjerg fB and Odense KFUM played at Københavns Idrætspark on 7 May 1964. It was the final match to determine the winner of the 1963–64 Danish Cup, the 10th season of the Danish national-wide annual football knockout competition, the Danish Cup, open to all DBU member clubs. This was the first time that two sides had ever met in a domestic cup competition and only the third time in a competitive league game. For Odense KFUM, the match represented their first opportunity to win a title on a national level, having never reached the quarterfinals in previous seasons in the cup's current incarnation, while Esbjerg fB were participating in their third cup final, having lost on both previous occasions. This was the third consecutive year the tournament's final featured a team from Odense.

Esbjerg fB played in the then top flight of Danish association football, 1st Division, and bypassed the initial stages of the tournament with an entry into the third round proper, while 2nd Division club Odense KFUM entered one round earlier. The last three season's reigning Danish league champions Esbjerg fB's road to the final included victories over BK Fremad Valby, Vorup Frederiksberg BK, B 1909 and Akademisk BK. Odense KFUM secured its berth in the final by defeating Holbæk B&IF, Knabstrup IF, Brønshøj BK, Aarhus GF, and the previous league season's runners-up and reigning cup title holders, B 1913.

The crowd of 24,500 witnessed Esbjerg fB defeating Odense KFUM 2–1, winning the competition for the first time in the club's history. The final was the seventh time out of ten occasions, that a team from the Jutland peninsula won the cup title. Esbjerg fB's centre-forward Carl Bertelsen, who scored the first goal of the game, was named as the man of the match (Danish: Årets Pokalfighter). As the winner of the tournament, Esbjerg fB qualified for the 1964–65 European Cup Winners' Cup. The last moments of the final and most of the award ceremony were marked by the spectator's deafening antipathy towards the Esbjerg fB-players, which several Danish newspapers characterized as a scandal.

== Route to the final ==
=== Esbjerg fB ===
The Esbjerg-based team bypassed the initial stages of the cup tournament with an entry in the third round proper as one of the twelve teams from the top-tier of Danish association football — then known as the 1st Division — one round later than their opponent in the final, and one week after their culmination of the 1963 league season. In their first cup match of the 1963–64 season, Esbjerg fB were drawn against the fifth-tier Københavnsserien side BK Fremad Valby, and on 24 November 1963 the team and managers traveled to BK Fremad Valby's home ground Valby Idrætspark located in the Copenhagen district of Valby. In front of a small crowd of 1,200 spectators, they won the match plagued by pouring rain with an icy wind across the football field, scoring all six goals including an own goal attributed to John Madsen that shortly equalized the score after 12 minutes of play. Esbjerg fB scored first with a goal by centre-forward Carl Bertelsen within four minutes into the first half. Following Madsen's own goal, having hit the ball incorrectly outside the reach of second-string goalie Verner Beck, the match remained tied for 17 minutes until Esbjerg fB's right winger Knud Petersen scored twice in the remainder of the first half and successfully executed a penalty kick in the 68th minute of play, completing the first and only hat-trick of his footballing career. Fellow striker Carl Emil Christiansen netted the last goal of the game four minutes later, and Esbjerg fB moved on to the next round with a final score of 1–5.

On 1 December 1963, Esbjerg fB hosted the 4th Division club Vorup Frederiksberg BK — the only remaining team from a league outside the three top divisional structure, and who was relegated to the Jutland Series next year — at their home ground, Esbjerg Stadium, in the fourth round. Esbjerg struck first through Egon Jensen after only four minutes of play to take a 1–0 lead in the first half, but Vorup Frederiksberg's Poul Erik Jacobsen tied the match in the 27th minute. Centre-forward Eigild Frandsen restored Esbjerg fB's lead after 10 minutes in the second half, which was his last match and goal before his first retirement from football for the entire 1964 season. The Randers suburban-based club was narrowly eliminated with a single goal, when they were unable to overtake Esbjerg fB's 2–1 lead. Innerwing Egon Jensen commented in an interview with Berlingske Tidende that his team underestimated their opponent from the fourth tier and experienced some problems controlling the match.

The team now turned their focus to the quarterfinals, travelling to Funen's largest venue, Odense Stadium, to play a Wednesday evening game with no floodlight usage against their league rivals B 1909 in a repeat of the 1962 cup final, on 15 April 1964 in front of a 16,420 large audience. Esbjerg fB gained the upper hand with goals scored by forwards E. Jensen and K. Petersen in the 20th and 62nd minute, respectively. The Odense-based team's goalkeeper Svend Aage Rask was unable to save Esbjerg fB's second goal, achieved via a penalty kick, awarded for use of hands against the red niners' left halfback Per Jacobsen, which secured the West Jutlanders' qualification for the penultimate round of the main tournament.

A week later, Esbjerg fB met another top-tier side Akademisk BK in their third away match of the competition. The semi-final match was held at Københavns Idrætspark on 24 April 1964 with an attendance of 16,900 spectators. The Danish FA had forgotten to acquire two linesmen for the match and last-second replacements from the audience (H. Johansen of B 1901 and the former EfB player Erik Engermann) had to take their place. The academics went on top with a Henning Stilling goal, despite an injury, two minutes after half time, following an assist by forward Leif Hammer. The lead of Akademisk BK was created in a period with strong defensive tactics from both teams, with the Akademisk BK defense denying almost every goal attempt from the forwards of Esbjerg fB, who could not properly manage to organise their attacks, producing just one semi-dangerous goal attempt in almost 3/4 of the match. Esbjerg fB finally broke through AB's effective 4–2–4 system in the 69th minute, when K. Petersen scored their first goal. With 20 minutes remaining of the game, the attacking play of the away team, headed by innerwing and playmaker C. E. Christiansen, began to unfold with C. E. Christiansen scoring twice in the 80th and 85th minute and Bertelsen scoring once in the 82nd minute, clinching Esbjerg fB's place in the final with a 4–1 victory.

=== Odense KFUM ===
Odense KFUM entered the Danish FA sanctioned competition one round earlier, in the second round proper, together with the other eleven teams from the then second-tier in Danish football, named 2nd Division, which meant that they had to win a total of five matches to reach the final. The Odense-based team began its campaign for the 1963–64 Danish FA Cup with a home turf game in Odense on 8 September 1963 versus Holbæk B&IF of the 3rd Division, winning the match with a clean sheet of 4–0, and earning them a berth into the third round of the knockout tournament.

Due to the condition of the ground, the third round cup match facing Knabstrup IF, based in Mørkøv in north-western Zealand, scheduled to take place at Odense Stadium on 24 November 1963, had to be moved to the adjacent Odense Athletics Stadium. KFUM progressed by winning 8–3 against the sixth-tier club on a heavy and wet grass turf after leading the match 6–0 at 60 minutes of play, following a scoring spree of three goals within a seven-minute time frame in the first half. The high-scoring match involved the KFUM players Helge Jørgensen (one on penalty), Kaj Peter Larsen and Jørgen Nielsen each scoring two goals with Tommy Madsen and Karsten Wiingreen making the remaining goals. Tage Jørgensen saved one penalty kick awarded to Knabstrup IF at the beginning of the first half.

Odense ended the year by hosting their last cup and competitive match on 1 December 1963 at Odense Stadium against 1st Division club Brønshøj BK, winning the fourth round proper game 3–0 (with a half time score of 2–0) without losing control with the match at any point. Two weeks prior to the cup game, Brønshøj BK had narrowly avoided relegation from the top-tier division on the last matchday.

The quarterfinal spot was the Odense KFUM's best result in the nationwide cup tournament, not taking into account the 1940 edition of the defunct Danmarkspokalturneringen. During the off season, Peter Eriksen, Niels Erik Kildemoes and Freddy Hansen joined the senior squad directly from the youth ranks, making their senior league debut in the club's inaugural game of the season against Køge BK on 30 March and then against Aalborg BK on 5 April. The quarterfinal game against 1st Division team Aarhus GF had been postponed to 8 April 1964 due to bad weather in December 1963. The Wednesday evening home game against the Aarhus-based team was held at Odense Stadium under floodlights, a circumstance that only H. Jørgensen had experience with from other competitive games. 4,800 spectators witnessed KFUM win the match 3–1, with forward F. Hansen scoring the first goal in the 20th minute, his first goal in his senior career, and H. Jørgensen scoring his sixth and seventh goal in the first three matches of the year. An ankle injury meant that full-back Eriksen was replaced with Henning Larsen in the upcoming matches, eventually missing out on the semi-final and the cup final.

The senior team's performance in the league and cup got noticed in the media and public, which helped increase their match attendance figures. With the game once again being staged at Odense Stadium, every cup match leading up to the final had now being played in their home city of Odense. The semi-final clash on 22 April 1964 to a crowd of 9,200 spectators against the defending cup title holders, runners-up in the previous league season, local city rivals and the then neighboring club at Kildemosen sports park, B 1913, ended in a 2–2 draw after full time, necessitating 30 minutes of extra time. B 1913 wore white jerseys as away colours at the match due to the blue-green clashing of the clubs' home kits — a similar decision was however not repeated at the cup final. The thirteeners took the lead in the 16th minute with a header goal via right winger Eigil Misser, but KFUM scored twice in the next ten minutes to come on top, until Misser scored an equalizer 9 minutes before the end of the second half. A 3–2 victory to Odense KFUM was secured with the decisive goal netted by H. Jørgensen in the 104th minute, completing a hat-trick and propelling the club to the cup final.

== Pre-match ==
=== Venue ===
The match was held at Københavns Idrætspark located at Øster Allé in the Østerbro district of Copenhagen and scheduled to take place on Ascension Day, Thursday 7 May 1964, which by now had become the traditional stadium and date for the cup final. The stadium had been the host stadium for the previous nine cup finals, and before 1953, the final of the regional cup tournament, KBUs Pokalturnering, took place at the venue. It was referred to as the national stadium for the Denmark national football team, the primary venue for the KBU representative team and several Copenhagen-based teams had their league and cup matches scheduled there, including exhibition games. At the beginning of the 1964 season calendar, more than 80 association football games were planned to be take place at the stadium.

The problematic condition of the exhibition football field became a topic in the days leading up to the final and the organizers were criticized for not ensuring that the most optimal external conditions for playing football were present at big matches. It was described as being lumpy, bulky and only having sparse grass in the corners due to its extensive usage by the Danish FA (DBU), that were scheduling too many football matches in a short period of time. Circa two weeks prior to the final, the football field was exposed to freezing temperatures and in the intervening time a total of seven matches over the course of nine days had been played at the stadium, including two league matches involving Esbjerg fB. Since being aware of the problematic football pitch and the unpredictable leaps made by the ball — compared to a well cared grass pitch — Esbjerg fB decided to move their last two training sessions to a dirt field in Esbjerg to get more accustomed to the conditions at the host stadium. At this point in time, the city of Copenhagen lacked additional sufficiently large stadiums, that could relieve the pressure on the country's premier football arena. While the nearby Østerbro Stadium had been rebuilt to also accommodate association football matches and act as a reserve venue for Københavns Idrætspark, it did not prove to be popular with neither the clubs nor the audience, discouraging the Danish FA from scheduling many top-tier and second-tier matches at the stadium. The arguments for not moving the games was mostly founded in economic reasons.

=== Analysis ===
Based on the two team's previous merits in the cup tournament and their present league standings, the last three season's reigning Danish league champions Esbjerg fB were regarded as favorites to win the cup title against Danish 2nd Division club Odense KFUM by various newspapers. Both teams were located in second place in their respective leagues at this point, having only lost one game each in the spring season. Esbjerg fB had twice before (in 1957 and 1962) reached the cup final, losing on both occasions and at the same time not scoring any goals. In contrast, this season's final was Odense KFUM's first appearance and their first season in which they had been among the final eight remaining teams in the competition. The two sides had previously never met each other in the domestic cup competition and only twice before in a competitive league match, which was during the third-tier's 1939–40 season. KFUM became the third team, competing in a league below the Danish 1st Division, to quality for the final, and the third Odense-based consecutive team to play in the final, after neighboring clubs B 1909 (in 1962) and B 1913 (in 1963).

Esbjerg fB's football kit would be their normal home colours consisting of blue and white vertical striped shirts with a blue collar and black shirt numbers on the back, dark blue coloured shorts and socks. The line-up for cup final would a continuation of those used in Esbjerg fB's previous two cup matches in 1964 against B 1909 and Akademisk BK and the previous three league matches against Kjøbenhavns BK, B 1913 and Brønshøj BK. Compared to the first two cup matches against BK Fremad Valby and Vorup Frederiksberg BK, goalkeeper Verner Beck (2 caps), forward Eigild Frandsen (2 caps) and forward Finn Nielsen (1 cap) has been replaced by goalkeeper Erik Gaardhøje and forward Bjarne Kikkenborg and defender Hans Jørgen Christiansen, while forwards Knud Clausen (1 cap) and Jørgen Peter Hansen (2 caps) had been used in the first two league games of the season. The Esbjerg fB squad featured eight active or former Danish senior national team players. Midfielder Jens Petersen of Esbjerg fB was named Danish Football Player of the Year in 1963. Esbjerg fB fielded two footballers, centre-half back John Madsen and left innerwing Egon Jensen, who had been in both of the club's previous two cup finals. With the exception of forward and playmaker Carl Emil Christiansen, who shortly before the 1962 cup final broke his arm and was replaced by E. Frandsen, and H. J. Christiansen, the remaining squad had all participated in the club's last cup final in 1962. The average age on match day was 23.82 years, with Madsen (26 years, 359 days) being the oldest player and Kikkenborg (21 years, 52 days) being the youngest. Knud Petersen (5 goals) was the club's highest scoring player in the 1963–64 cup tournament with C. E. Christiansen (3 goals) in second place. Carl Bertelsen became the club's top goalscorer in the 1963 season, scoring 18 league goals, while C. E. Christiansen had been a shared top goalscorer in the 1962 Danish 1st Division (24 goals). After the first 10 competitive matches (league, regional and national cup) of the 1964 season, Bertelsen was listed as the Esbjerg fB player having scored the most goals (7), while C. E. Christiansen had scored the second highest number of goals (4).

For the club's most high-profile match to date, the players of Odense KFUM would be wearing their usual light green-coloured shirts with a white neck stripe and the club's green YMCA triangle placed on their left chest, white shirt numbers on their backs, dark green shorts with thin white stripes on the sides/lower section and white socks. The club finished their 1963 season in fifth place in the second tier. Odense KFUM's starting XI featured one Danish senior national team player (Helge Jørgensen), who had been the top goalscorer three consecutive seasons; in the third-tier league in 1958 (26 goals; shared title), 1959 (26 goals) and 1960 (28 goals). At this point in time, Freddy Hansen had scored 4 goals and H. Jørgensen 7 goals in the first 6 league matches, two goals behind Per Bartram of Odense BK leading the second-tier's top goalscorer chart in the present season. The exact same eleven players in the Odense KFUM line-up for the cup's showpiece match was also fielded in the preceding away league games against Hvidovre IF and Ikast FS, and in the last cup match against B 1913. The football team's core was built around the two brothers, forward and playmaker Helge Jørgensen and goalkeeper Tage Jørgensen, including winger Niels Erik Kildemoes. On match day, the players on the Odense KFUM squad were between 19 years (Henning Larsen, Kildemoes and F. Hansen) and 30 years old (Tage Jørgensen), with an average age of 23.09 years. H. Jørgensen (204), T. Jørgensen (177), Jørgen Nielsen (140), Jørgen Larsen (105) and Svend Erik Petersen (52) were the most capped players on the first senior squad of Odense KFUM. Both teams' selections for the final were made public on 5 May 1964.

=== Organization ===
Arrangements was made for 60 of Esbjerg fB's managers and their ladies to travel from Esbjerg to Copenhagen, and back, on 7 May using buses. The Odense KFUM players and managers, with their ladies, departed from Odense on match day at 08:00 CET to Copenhagen in two team buses – bringing their own packed lunches just as for any other away fixture. The local newspaper Fyens Stiftstidende and DSB arranged for an extra train with inexpensive tickets (DKK 29) to transport the fans of the Odense-based club on a round-trip from Odense to Copenhagen on the day of the cup final. A similar one-day roundtrip to the capital with train (DKK 45) was arranged by Statsbanernes Rejsebureau for the fans of Esbjerg fB, but it was cancelled due to lack of interest. The cup game would be attended by the mayor of Odense, Holger Larsen, and the deputy mayor of Esbjerg, Henning Rasmussen.

Onsite ticket sales to seatings began at 10:00 CET from the booths outside the grandstand at Per Henrik Lings Allé (at the time, no pre-ordering of tickets existed), the gates opened at 12:00 CET, entertainment by the Stævnet brass band, Stævnets orkester, started playing at 12:30 CET, and the match was scheduled to begin at 13:30 local time (UTC+1:00). Ticket prices varied between DKK 2 and 7 depending on it being a seat at the grandstand (nicknamed Den dyre langside) in the north section (DKK 6 and 7), access to the south stand known as B.93's langside (nicknamed Den billige langside) next to B.93's football pitch (DKK 5), the west end stand with standing areas referred to as Cementen next to Øster Allé (DKK 5) or the east end stand with standing areas next to the hockey pitch (Hockeybanen) and Østerbro Stadium (DKK 4) – children and privates paid DKK 2. The match was not broadcast live or displaced on national television, but had live coverage on the Danmarks Radio's radio broadcast known as Program 1 in the time slot between 13:20 and 15:15 CET – at the time an agreement between Danmarks Radio and the Danish FA did not exist. An estimated number of circa 2 million listeners joined in on the live radio transmission by the news media Pressens Radioavis. Approximately 12–13 minutes of match highlights from the cup final would be shown the same evening on Danmarks Radio's primary news broadcast, named Aktuelt, at 22:20–22:45 CET by the Danish TV channel's department of sports, TV-Sport.

The match was refereed by Carl W. Hansen (of Slagelse; affiliated with the Zealand FA), who had been FIFA registered since 1963 and was supervising top-tier Danish league and cup matches since the 1950s. This became his second cup final, having previously been a lines man in the 1959 cup final replay. The semi-final match in late April 1964 between Akademisk BK versus Esbjerg fB had been refereed by C. W. Hansen. He was assisted by the two linesmen, Hans Asmussen and Ejner Espersen (of Albertslund), both from the local Copenhagen FA.

== Match ==
=== Summary ===
==== First half ====
External image
- Photograph of match action in the Esbjerg fB's penalty area during an Odense KFUM's attack in the 2nd half of the cup final on 7 May 1964 at Københavns Idrætpark.

The draw at the beginning of the match, concerning the right to choose the starting half of the football field, resulted in Odense KFUM getting the goal facing the western side of the stadium, towards Øster Allé, while Esbjerg fB started off with the goal in the east section, situated next to Østerbro Stadium. The weather on match day was sunny with an almost cloudless sky, and a light to fresh westerly wind — the maximum temperature was measured to 16 °C in Copenhagen. Both teams were employed in standard 2–3–5 formations typical of the era, consisting of two full-backs, three half-backs, and five forwards, while Esbjerg fB was also using a fluent 4–2–4 system.

The match was initiated with a couple of close scoring opportunities by Esbjerg fB's Carl Bertelsen, but Odense KFUM and goalkeeper Tage Jørgensen managed not to concede any goals. The closest first goal attempt was produced by the Odense-based team's Helge Jørgensen after 15 minutes of game play. H. Jørgensen received a long horizontal pass from his team colleague innerwing Jørgen Nielsen within the penalty area, got himself into a free position in front of the goal, but eventually his final shoot ended several meters outside the target. Another close attempt was made by H. Jørgensen in the middle of the first half, once again receiving a pass from Nielsen, who was looking to dribble his way past the opponent's defenses, but ended up performing a somersault over the legs of Esbjerg fB's John Madsen. Esbjerg midfielder Jens Petersen had several shot attempts from the distance, which did not cause the Odense KFUM keeper any issues, while forward Bertelsen had two headers towards Odense KFUM's goal, both with no success. A few minutes before the referee sounded the half time whistle, some fumble play in front of Esbjerg fB's half-empty goal ended with a shot by center Odense KFUM forward Freddy Hansen, but Esbjerg fB's goalkeeper Erik Gaardhøje saved the attempt using his foot.

During periods of the first half, when Esbjerg fB had the advantage in the game play, they combined at a faster pace than the Odense KFUM players. J. Petersen stated that his team had difficulties penetrating Odense KFUM's lines of defence. The tactics determined by KFUM's head coach Ole Petersen and the match selection committee, presided by Ove Birkholm, were to have the team's inner wings fall back to the Odense defensive area and pick up the ball, while attempting to keep the ball in play, until the left and right wingers were back in their positions – the same strategy employed by the Odense KFUM team in the last couple of competitive matches, which had successfully paid off. Sports editor at Aktuelt, Knud Lundberg, praised KFUM's tactics of deliberately slowing down the pace, keeping the ball in play with short passings at the center of the football field, and slowly initiating their attacks as a countermeasure to EfB's fast-paced squad, especially in the first half. Due to H. Jørgensen being deemed a relatively slow footballer by the opposing team players despite his technical skills and goal scoring abilities, the tactics by Esbjerg fB did not involve an EfB player getting the responsibility of guarding him throughout the entire game. The first half ended with no goals being scored by either sides, who were evenly matched up until the 60th minute into the second half.

==== Second half ====
External videos
- Video clips of the three goals in the final. Highlights (see 36:41–37:58) from the game as part of the TV broadcast Sportens årsrevy 1964 at Danmarks Radio on 3 January 1965.

At the very beginning of the second half, Carl Bertelsen was able to get through Odense KFUM's defensive lines, but Tage Jørgensen managed to tackle and prevent a goal. A few minutes later a surprising shot towards the goal by Helge Jørgensen — his best attempt in the entire match, following a pass from half back Jørgen Larsen — was saved in flying style by EfB's keeper Erik Gaardhøje, resulting in the opponent being given a corner kick. Esbjerg fB got a lead after 18 minutes of match action, when Bjarne Kikkenborg in a free position sent a pass from the back line on the left side over to Bertelsen, who was placed inside the goal area. Bertelsen rushed towards the target and without any hesitation he made a low flying flat shot with his left foot, scoring against Odense KFUM. The ball game was now constantly taking place outside Odense KFUM's goal. Esbjerg fB increased their lead to 2–0 after 25 minutes in the second half. A corner kick, executed by Knud Petersen, in the right side eventually arrived at Bertelsen, who failed his kick due to a tackle, but it eluded the defense and the ball continued to a free Kikkenborg a few meters from the goal, who scored by hitting the lower edge of the crossbar ending up in the net. Left half back J. Larsen and his teammate, T. Jørgensen, were present at the goal line, but unable to intervene.

Odense did not give up their attacks on their opponent's goal, trying to get a tie to the match, and any chance was followed through. They were eventually able to score their first goal, made by forward Niels Erik Kildemoes, 8 minutes before full time, reducing the score to 2–1. The prelude to the goal was created by H. Jørgensen, who in the left side dribbled his way past 2–3 Esbjerg players, attempting to pass the ball to centre-forward Freddy Hansen, who failed at his kick just outside Gaardhøje's reach, but the ball was picked up by KFUM's 19 years old right winger Kildemoes, who sent the ball into Esbjerg fB's net via the right goal post, between the legs of defender Preben Jensen. Afterwards, Esbjerg fB's innerwing Egon Jensen caused a corner kick, which resulted in two goal attempts by Bertelsen with T. Jørgensen saving on both occasions, despite Odense KFUM's pressure. Esbjerg were under much pressure from Odense in the final minutes of the cup final and centre half back John Madsen and right half back Jens Jørgen Hansen discredited their team with the audience by kicking the ball far out of the field in time-consuming maneuvers.

After two failed corner kick attempts by Odense and only 3 to 4 minutes before the final whistle, KFUM's forward H. Jørgensen managed to pluck the ball from an inattentive Gaardhøje as the Esbjerg fB's goalkeeper, who was in no hurry, was about to do a goal kick. The defensive line of Esbjerg fB had already moved up the field, expecting a long kick from Gaardhøje. The Jutland keeper pursued the Funen team's innerwing to the right back line towards the corner flag, and when H. Jørgensen managed to dribble himself free, starting a run towards the goal in an arc around the goalkeeper, Gaardhøje somewhat deliberately grabbed H. Jørgensen's legs from behind in an unregulated manner about half a meter just outside the penalty area. A warning was given by the referee and an indisputable free kick was awarded to the Odense team – after a delay caused by P. Jensen, the free kick attempt by Kildemoes went over the goal. The Zealand-based referee was not under the impression, that the goalkeeper's offense should have resulted in a dismissal from the game, drawing comparisons to deliberate use of hands in an obvious scoring situation. However, the act made the goalkeeper and the whole team very unpopular among the majority of the 24,500 spectators, and the protests failed to settle before the referee ended the match – both the players and spectators had otherwise behaved nicely and quietly in the first part of the game. Odense KFUM did not manage to equalize in the last moments of the match, avoiding 30 minutes of extra time (2 x 15 minutes) being added.

=== Details ===
7 May 1964
13:30 CET

Esbjerg fB	2–1	Odense KFUM
Carl Bertelsen 63'; Bjarne Kikkenborg 71'		Niels Erik Kildemoes 83'

Københavns Idrætspark, Copenhagen
Attendance: 24,500
Referee: Carl W. Hansen (Slagelse)

Esbjerg fB	Odense KFUM

GK	1	(Denmark) Erik Gaardhøje
FB	2	(Denmark) Hans Jørgen Christiansen
FB	3	(Denmark) Preben Jensen
HB	4	(Denmark) Jens Jørgen Hansen (c)
HB	5	(Denmark) John Madsen
HB	6	(Denmark) Jens Petersen
FW	7	(Denmark) Knud Petersen
FW	8	(Denmark) Carl Emil Christiansen
FW	9	(Denmark) Carl Bertelsen
FW	10	(Denmark) Egon Jensen
FW	11	(Denmark) Bjarne Kikkenborg
Head coach:
(Denmark) Arne Sørensen

Man of the match

- Carl Bertelsen (Esbjerg fB)

Match officials

- Assistant referees/linesmen:
  - Hans Asmussen (Copenhagen FA)
  - Ejner Espersen (Copenhagen FA)

GK	1	(Denmark) Tage Jørgensen
FB	2	(Denmark) Svend Erik Petersen
FB	3	(Denmark) Henning Larsen
HB	4	(Denmark) Regnar Laursen
HB	5	(Denmark) Bent Johansen (c)
HB	6	(Denmark) Jørgen Larsen
FW	7	(Denmark) Niels Erik Kildemoes
FW	8	(Denmark) Jørgen Nielsen
FW	9	(Denmark) Freddy Hansen
FW	10	(Denmark) Helge Jørgensen
FW	11	(Denmark) Karsten Wiingreen
Head coach:
(Denmark) Ole Petersen

Match rules

- 90 minutes.
- 30 minutes of extra time if necessary.
- Replay match if scores still level.
- No substitutes.

== Post-match ==
External image
- The Esbjerg fB squad players at the award ceremony (before being handed the trophy) following their win in the 1964 cup final.

Following the conclusion of the season's cup final, the winning team's captain Jens Jørgen Hansen was presented with the cup trophy while present on the football field by the chairman of the Danish FA, Ebbe Schwartz — the trophy could be kept in the club's temporary possession for one year. According to the proportions of the cup tournament, a club needed to win the present trophy five consecutive seasons or six times successive, obtaining so called lots, to keep the then cup trophy in play permanently – the same rules applied for the trophy of the Danish league championship. At a reception later the same day, hosted by the Danish FA at their offices, the players on the winning team were also honored with eleven gold medals awarded by Schwartz, while the eleven players on the losing team received silver medallions. The victory was the first time that Esbjerg fB had won the competition in their club's history, and the seventh time out of the competition's ten editions, that a team from the Jutland FA won the cup title.

A committee of Copenhagen-based journalists from the organisation of Danish sports journalists, Danske Sportsjournalister (DS), named Esbjerg fB's 26 years old centre-forward Carl Bertelsen as the man of the match (Danish: Årets Pokalfighter; MoM) with a majority of the votes. As representative for the sports journalists behind the installation of the award, sports editor Poul Prip Andersen of Berlingske Tidende handed Bertelsen a silver cup after the football match. Bertelsen received four votes in the MoM election, Odense KFUM's half back Regnar Laursen obtained two votes, while the Funen inner wing Jørgen Nielsen got one vote.

Erik Gaardhøje had given Helge Jørgensen an apology after the match had ended and did not hide the fact the forward had plucked the ball from Gaardhøje in a fair manner – H. Jørgensen accepted the apology and congratulated Gaardhøje on winning the match. The majority of the spectators expressed their dissatisfaction with the dramatic finish of the match by continuing their whistling and shouting during the award ceremony, so the words of Schwartz during his homage speech to the winners could barely be heard, with Schwartz having to pause his speech several times. Several of the Esbjerg fB players eagerly debated whether they should leave the field in protest, with officials, some other players and their head coach Arne Sørensen insisting that they stay on the field – this happened before the Danish FA's secretary general, Erik Hyldstrup, had handed the trophy to Schwartz. One Esbjerg fB player, Knud Petersen, lashed out at a photographer, when the person tried to take a picture of his exposed team player, Gaardhøje, who was in tears, resulting in the stadium's security escorting the photographer off the field. Schwartz ended up venting his own personal disappointment and stating his sharpest disapproval of Gaardhøje's actions, calling his actions very unsportsmanlike in front of both Gaardhøje and Esbjerg fB's captain J. J. Hansen, through the venue's speaker system and on an open radio microphone hosted by Gunnar "Nu" Hansen.

The Danish FA's chairman was criticized for his undiplomatic and misplaced statements, behavior and lack of conduct at the ceremony, which was one of the causes for Gaardhøje eventually leaving the field in tears. The players on both teams and the newspapers criticized the audience for continuing their antipathy towards Esbjerg fB and their inappropriate, shameful and inexcusable behavior after Esbjerg's goalkeeper had already received his warning by the only executive and judicial person on the football field. Several newspapers went so far as to characterize the final as a scandal the following day, including Jyllands-Posten, BT, Aktuelt, Fyens Stiftstidende, Aarhus Stiftstidende, Berlingske Tidende and Vestkysten.

The players, all with amateur status, and managers of Esbjerg fB celebrated the victory with a dinner in the evening at Hotel Hafnia in Copenhagen. The vice-chairman of the Danish FA attended the dinner as a guest. On their way home, the Odense team stopped in the middle of Slagelse to hold a small party at the Hotel Postgaarden, attended by the mayor of Odense, Holger Larsen – the 1962 and 1963 cup winners, B 1909 and B 1913, had held their celebrations in the same location. Economically, due to the large attendance and gate entrance revenue, the final generated a net profit of an estimated DKK 35,000 (1964) to each club. The Danish Cup winners were awarded a berth to the first round of the 1964–65 European Cup Winners' Cup, representing Denmark. If the event of Esbjerg fB finishing at the top of the 1964 Danish 1st Division after the 1964 spring season's first 11 matches, and hence qualifying for the 1964–65 European Cup via their league position, the European Cup Winners' Cup place would have been passed on to Odense KFUM as runners-up.
