= 1963–64 Danish Cup =

DBUs Landspokalturnering 1963–64

Tournament details
- Country: Denmark
- Dates: May 1963 – July 1963 (qualifying competition); 17 August 1963 – 7 May 1964 (main competition)
- Teams: 707 (overall); 671 (qualifying competition); 80 (main competition)

Final positions
- Champions: Esbjerg fB (1st title)
- Runners-up: Odense KFUM

Tournament statistics
- Matches played: 79 (main competition)
- All statistics do not include qualifying play-offs

External image
- Match action during the season's cup final on 7 May 1964 at Københavns Idrætpark.

The 1963–64 Danish Cup (Danish: DBUs Landspokalturnering 1963–64) was the 10th installment of the Danish Cup, the national association football cup competition in Denmark. This year's edition began with the regional qualifying rounds among the lower ranking members of the six regional governing bodies in early May 1963, and concluded with the grand cup final on 7 May 1964. A total of 707 clubs participated in the cup tournament – the highest number of teams since the cup's foundation. 671 teams were registered for the qualifying rounds, of which only 44 teams would quality for the proper rounds, under the auspices of the Danish FA's tournament committee, joined by 36 additional teams from the first, second and third divisions in the Danish football league system.

B 1913 were the defending champions of last season, but they were eliminated by Odense KFUM in the semi-finals. Top-flight league club Esbjerg fB won the competition for the first time (despite having reached the 1957 and 1962 finals), beating Odense KFUM of the second-highest division 2–1 in the final at Københavns Idrætspark. The winners qualified for the first round of the 1964–65 European Cup Winners' Cup. Four cup matches were televised, which was allowed as part of the formal agreement worth DKK 250,000 (2003) that Danmarks Radio reached with the Danish FA's business committee on 7 May 1963, and subsequently approved by the Radiorådet. 15 minutes of match highlights from each game – namely the third-round game between B 1909 and Esbjerg KFUM, both semi-finals and the cup final – were broadcast, following those games, on Danmarks Radio's primary news broadcasts, named Aktuelt and Sportsorientering.

== Qualifying rounds ==
All of the teams that entered the competition, but were not playing in the top-flight league, second division and third division, had to compete in the qualifying rounds.

== First round proper ==
All twelve teams from the 1963 Danish 3rd Division entered the cup tournament for the first time joined by the 44 teams that had qualified through the qualifying rounds. One club from the qualifying rounds of the Bornholm FA went on to the proper rounds. Eight clubs from the qualifying rounds of the Copenhagen FA qualified for the proper rounds. Nine member teams of the Zealand FA were transferred from the qualifying rounds to the main cup competition administrated by the Danish FA. Seven teams from the qualifying rounds held under the Funen FA entered the first round proper, but were all eliminated, leaving only the four Odense-based teams in the top-flight and second level. Three teams (Holeby IF, Nakskov BK and B 1921) from the Lolland-Falster FA qualified for the proper rounds, while two Lolland-Falster based teams (BK Frem Sakskøbing and B 1901), already present in the divisions, entered in the first round. 16 clubs progressed from the qualifying rounds of the Jutland FA. The 56 teams were administratively split into a western group (vest-kredsen) and an eastern group (øst-kredsen), each consisting of 28 teams, ahead of the draw at the Danish FA's offices on the evening of 22 July 1963.

=== East Group ===
17 August 1963	Lyngby BK (3)	6–1	Østerbros BK (6)	Kongens Lyngby
16:00 CET	Jens Henrik Nielsen ?', ?'; Orla Astrup ?'; Jan Lorentzen ?'; Flemming Hansen ?' (pen.)		n/a ?' n/a ?' (o.g.)	Stadium: Lyngby Stadium

17 August 1963	Kastrup BK (5)	4–2	Helsingør IF (4)	Kastrup
17:30 CET	Jørgen Osbeck 5', 15', 25', ?'		John Jensen ?'; Kurt Nielsen ?'	Stadium: Tårnby Stadium

17 August 1963	BK Frederiksholm (5)	1–2	BK Rødovre (3)	Valby, Copenhagen
16:00 CET				Stadium: Valby Idrætspark

17 August 1963	Holeby IF (6)	1–8	Roskilde BK (3)	Holeby
17:30 CET	Bent Jørgen Lund 30'		Preben Sivebæk 10', 2h' Per Nielsen 1h' Thomas Christiansen 1h', 2h', 2h', 2h' John Olsen 2h'	Stadium: Holeby Stadium; Attendance: 200; Referee: Henry Dziegiel (Nakskov)

17 August 1963	Knabstrup IF (6)	3–2	B 1908 (5)
18:00 CET

18 August 1963	Politiets IF (7)	3–2	B 1921 (5)	Valby, Copenhagen
	Peter Petersen 1h' Brinck Jacobsen 2h' Kjeld Orla Jensen ?'		Ole Winther 2h', 2h'	Stadium: Valby Idrætspark

18 August 1963	KFUM København (3)	0–3	BK Fremad Valby (5)	Emdrup, Copenhagen
			Palle Larsen 5', 75'; Kurt Sørensen 70'	Stadium: Emdrupparkens Idrætsanlæg; Attendance: 200

18 August 1963	Frederiksborg IF (5)	4–1	BK Frem Sakskøbing (3)	Hillerød
	Bent Sonne 20'; Tonny Jønsson 25', 53'; Finn Hansen 44'		Frits Hansen 80'	Stadium: Hillerød Stadium; Attendance: 700

18 August 1963	Vordingborg IF (5)	3–2	BK Dalgas (5)	Vordingborg
	Svend Hemmingsen 30'; Arne Nielsen 70'; Poul Erik Jensen 87' (pen.)		Leon Strøm 10'; Ole Andreasen 2h'	Stadium: Vordingborg Stadium

18 August 1963	Hvidovre IF (3)	9–2	Taastrup IK (5)	Hvidovre
	Lars Bo Henriksen ?', ?', ?', ?'; Leif Sørensen 2h', ?', ?'; Allan Hebo Larsen ?', ?'		Orla Larsen 1h' Kaj Østergaard 1h'	Stadium: Hvidovre Stadium; Attendance: 1,500

18 August 1963	Kalundborg GF&BK (4)	1–3	Søborg BK (6)	Kalundborg
	Jens Nissen 2h'		Henning Hansen 1h', 1h' Palle Hansen 2h' (pen.)

18 August 1963	Nakskov BK (4)	3–2	Næstved IF (3)	Nakskov
14:00 CET	Kurt Engel 30', 55', 81'		Jørgen Hansen 36'; Erik Dyreborg 70'	Stadium: Nakskov Idrætspark; Attendance: 800; Referee: Boye Jensen (Søllested)

18 August 1963	Holbæk B&IF (3)	8–1	Nexø BK (5)	Holbæk
	Arne Nielsen 12', 43', 80'; Flemming Mortensen 28', 7?'; Jørgen Jørgensen 34', 54'; Kent Østergaard 6?'		Halle Lau Møller 61'	Stadium: Holbæk Stadium; Attendance: 1,000

18 August 1963	Glostrup IC (6)	3–3 (a.e.t.) (4–3 p)	Frederiksberg BK (4)	Glostrup
10:00 CET	Arne Nielsen 75'; Arne Nielsen 2h' Arne Nielsen 3/4h'		Keld Maahr 1/2h' Keld Maahr 1/2h' Keld Maahr 128'	Stadium: Glostrup Idrætspark; Attendance: 200
	Penalties
	Jørgen Starup (penalty scored); Sv. Petersen (penalty scored); Hg. Madsen (penalty scored) n/a (penalty missed); Leif Nielsen (penalty scored)		(penalty scored) John Sørensen; (penalty scored) Bjarne Henriksen; (penalty scored) Torben Jensen; (penalty missed) n/a (penalty missed) n/a

=== West Group ===
17 August 1963	Vorup Frederiksberg BK (4)	8–0	Hadsund BK (7)	Frederiksberg, Randers
16:30 CET	William Fahlberg 8' (pen.); Aage Overgaard 29', 41', 43'; Niels Hougaard 51' (pen.); Gudmund Iversen 68'; Poul Jensen 8?'; Henning Christensen 8?'			Stadium: Frederiksberg Stadium; Attendance: 250; Referee: Jaimer Collin-Hansen (Silkeborg)

18 August 1963	Slagelse BK&IF (5)	4–0	BK Marienlyst (5)	Slagelse
	John Jensen 50'; Helmer Hansen 70'; Erik Jense 80'		John Danielsen 81' (o.g.)	Attendance: 200

18 August 1963	Rudkøbing BK (6)	2–5	IK Aalborg Freja (5)	Rudkøbing
13:30 CET	Orla Hansen 15'; Poul E. Petersen 22'		Jørgen Larsen 5', 8'; Freddy Jensen 57'; Jørgen Toft 63'; Per Larsen 75'	Stadium: Rudkøbing Stadium

18 August 1963	Thisted IK (6)	2–0	Svendborg fB (4)	Thisted
	Ole Petersen 40', 80'

18 August 1963	Assens G&IK (5)	2–3	Bjerringbro IF (7)	Assens
	Bent Rose 14'		Elvar Knudsen 5'; Jørgen Bang Mikkelsen 20', 51'; Per Andersen 60' (o.g.)	Stadium: Assens Stadium

18 August 1963	Brande IF (4)	1–3	Viby IF (5)	Brande

18 August 1963	AIA (3)	12–2	Taars-Ugilt IF (6)	Aarhus
	Finn Thygesen ?', ?', ?', ?'; Leif Holm ?', ?', ?'; Poul Petersen ?', ?'; Erik Christensen ?', ?'; Erik Fuhr Sørensen ?'		Ole Hansen 2h', 2h'	Stadium: Aarhus Idrætspark; Attendance: 200

18 August 1963	Esbjerg KFUM (5)	3–2	Kolding IF (3)	Esbjerg
				Stadium: Esbjerg Stadium

18 August 1963	Middelfart G&BK (6)	1–2	Silkeborg IF (4)	Middelfart
	Svend Otto Andersen 67'		Viggo Jensen 1h' Per Damgaard 1h'

18 August 1963	Borup FF (8)	0–5	BK Herning Fremad (5)

18 August 1963	Hobro IK (6)	1–1 (a.e.t.) (4–2 p)	Nyborg G&IF (5)	Hobro
14:30 CET	Harry Frederiksen 52'		Aage Hansen 61'	Stadium: Hobro Stadium; Attendance: 1,000; Referee: Eigil Thomsen (Aalborg) (Note: In the first round fixture between Hobro IK and Nyborg G&IF, the referee Eigil Thomsen (Aalborg) was hospitalized after the full time whistle, and replaced by the linesman Gunnar Hansen (Aalborg), who judged the extra time and penalty kick competition. P. B. Jensen (Hobro) became the new linesman.) and Gunnar Hansen (Aalborg)
	Penalties
	Flemming Hansen (penalty scored); Erik Schmidt (penalty scored); Ib Jørgensen (penalty scored); Carl Erik Christensen (penalty scored)		Ib Eriksen (penalty scored); Aage Hansen (penalty missed); Leif Eriksen (penalty missed) n/a (penalty scored)

18 August 1963	Næsby G&IF (6)	1–2 (a.e.t.)	Vejen SF (6)	Odense
10:00 CET	Tom Nielsen 5'; Kjeld Hansen 110' (o.g.)		Per Madsen 6'

18 August 1963	Varde GF (6)	1–4	IK Chang Aalborg (3)	Varde
13:30 CET	Poul Verner Pedersen 46'		Jens Erik Ahrentoft 60'; Bjarne Jensen 62', 85'; Ivan Nielsen 67'	Stadium: Varde Stadium; Attendance: 1,000

18 August 1963	Hjørring IF (5)	2–3	IK Skovbakken (3)	Hjørring
13:30 CET	Børge Jensen 46'; Kresten Møller Andersen 89'		Ole Frikke 66'; Ove Kaiser 70'; Kent Christensen 83'	Stadium: Hjørring Stadium; Attendance: 400; Referee: Knud Møller (Odense)

== Second round proper ==
All twelve teams from the Danish 2nd Division entered the cup tournament for the first time. The draw for the round took place in the afternoon at the offices of the Danish FA at Københavns Idrætspark on 19 August 1963.

7 September 1963	Hvidovre IF (3)	5–0	IK Chang Aalborg (3)	Hvidovre
16:00 CET	Lars Bo Henriksen 30', 62'; Finn Cyril Sørensen 69'; Leif Sørensen 71', 72'			Stadium: Hvidovre Stadium; Attendance: 1,907

7 September 1963	BK Rødovre (3)	1–0	Glostrup IC (6)	Rødovre
16:00 CET	Svend Erik Understrup 60'			Stadium: Rødovre Stadium; Attendance: 550

7 September 1963	Knabstrup IF (6)	4–3 (a.e.t.)	Kastrup BK (5)	Mørkøv
16:00 CET	Per Frederiksen 55', 73', 110'; Arne Dyrholm 70'		Ib Leo Jensen 15'; Jørgen Osbeck 50', 60'	Stadium: Knabstrup Stadium; Attendance: 800

7 September 1963	IK Aalborg Freja (5)	1–4	B.93 (2)	Aalborg
19:00 CET	Jørn Toft 57'		Bernhard Deneke 17'; Svend Aage Petersen 25'; Walther Jensen 80', 85'	Stadium: Aalborg Stadium; Attendance: 1,200

8 September 1963	Skovshoved IF (2)	1–5	AIA (3)	Gentofte
10:00 CET	Bent Rasmussen 54'		Finn Thygesen 15', 38'; Bjørn Eppler 35'; Erling Johansen 50' (pen.); Erik Christensen 78'	Stadium: Gentofte Stadium; Attendance: 200

8 September 1963	BK Frem (2)	10–0	Bjerringbro IF (7)	Valby, Copenhagen
10:00 CET	Palle Stegler 6', 31'; Bruno Christensen 7', 90'; Leif Nielsen 14', 15', 79', 84'; Birger Larsen 48' (pen.); Jørgen Storm Hansen 75'			Stadium: Valby Idrætspark; Attendance: 2,100; Referee: Carsten Sørensen

8 September 1963	Vanløse IF (2)	3–0	Viby IF (5)	Vanløse, Copenhagen
10:00 CET	Per Andersen 77'; Uno Ternstrøm 78'		Anders Andersen 70' (o.g.)	Stadium: Vanløse Idrætspark; Attendance: 650

8 September 1963	IK Skovbakken (3)	0–2 (a.e.t.)	Vejen SF (6)	Aarhus
10:00 CET			Per Madsen 94', 106'	Stadium: Riisvangen Stadium; Attendance: 300

8 September 1963	BK Fremad Valby (5)	7–0	Politiets IF (7)	Valby, Copenhagen
12:00 CET	Kurt Sørensen 28', 35', 65', 68'; Palle Larsen 49'; John Elsbøl 75'; Flemming Olsen 77'			Stadium: Valby Idrætspark; Attendance: 250; Referee: Poul Juel Mortensen

8 September 1963	Odense KFUM (2)	4–0	Holbæk B&IF (3)	Odense
13:15 CET	Jørgen Nielsen 9'; Per Jensen 73', 77', 80'			Stadium: Odense Stadium; Attendance: 454; Referee: Palle Haagensen (Svendborg)

8 September 1963	Viborg FF (2)	3–1	Frederikshavn fI (2)	Viborg
13:30 CET	Bjarne Andersen 31'; John Olesen 87'; Finn Døssing 89'		Poul Hansen 22'	Stadium: Viborg Stadium; Attendance: 3,300; Referee: Erling B. Hansen (Dalum)

8 September 1963	Ikast FS (2)	2–1	BK Herning Fremad (5)	Ikast
13:30 CET	Bent Jacobsen 51'		Finn Olsen 48' (pen.); Poul Erik Overgaard 82' (o.g.)	Stadium: Ikast Stadium; Attendance: 1,600; Referee: Poul Laursen

8 September 1963	Slagelse BK&IF (5)	1–3	Randers SK Freja (2)	Slagelse
13:30 CET	Kurt Jørgensen 63' (pen.)		Knud Olesen 21'; Halfdan Nielsen 72' (pen.); Flemming Jensen 80'	Stadium: Slagelse Stadium; Attendance: 1,650; Referee: Erik Engemann (SBU)

8 September 1963	Thisted IK (6)	2–6	Horsens FS (2)	Thisted
13:30 CET	Knud Jensen 50'; Finn Andersen 75'		Finn Larsen 1h', 1h', 1h', 35'; Finn Geertsen 65'; Max Møller 8?' (pen.)	Attendance: 1,350; Referee: Asbjørn Nielsen

8 September 1963	Silkeborg IF (4)	1–3	Lyngby BK (3)	Silkeborg
13:30 CET	John Eriksen 60'		Freddy Aaboe 48' (pen.); Knud Christensen 70'; Jan Lorentzen 89'	Stadium: Silkeborg Stadium; Attendance: 800

8 September 1963	Vordingborg IF (5)	0–2	Roskilde BK (3)	Vordingborg
13:30 CET			Thomas Christiansen 53'; Jens Olsen 57'	Stadium: Vordingborg Stadium; Attendance: 850

8 September 1963	Esbjerg KFUM (5)	3–2	Hobro IK (6)	Esbjerg
13:30 CET	Henning Petersen 5', 51'; Svend Strandsberg 70'		Henning Nielsen 18'; Erik Schmidt 87'	Stadium: Esbjerg Stadium; Attendance: 750; Referee: Bent Clausen (JBU)

8 September 1963	Frederiksborg IF (5)	4–1	Søborg BK (6)	Hillerød
13:30 CET	Tony Jønsson 23', 70'; Bent Sonne 30' (pen.), 88'		Palle Hansen 65' (pen.)	Stadium: Hillerød Stadium; Attendance: 800; Referee: Edgar Petersen (Copenhagen)

8 September 1963	Nakskov BK (4)	2–3	Odense BK (2)	Nakskov
14:00 CET	Kurt Engel 64'; Bent "Ølle" Jensen 70'		John Kyndbøl 11', 52'; Preben Hjorth 44'	Stadium: Nakskov Idrætspark; Attendance: 1,800; Referee: Carl Erik Nielsen (Odense) (Note: The referee, Carl Erik Nielsen, assigned to the cup match between Nakskov BK vs Odense BK on 8 September 1963 was from the city of Odense, but was not a member of Odense BK. For that reason, the Danish FA did not question the referee's impartiality.)

8 September 1963	Vorup Frederiksberg BK (4)	2–0	Hellerup IK (2)	Frederiksberg, Randers
14:15 CET	Allan Voigt 65'		Jørgen Bang 43' (o.g.)	Stadium: Frederiksberg Stadium; Attendance: 1,500; Referee: Aage Sørensen (Aarhus)

== Third round proper ==
All twelve teams from the Danish 1st Division entered the cup tournament for the first time. The draw for round three took place on 9 September 1963 17:00 CET at the offices of the Danish FA. The third round matches of the cup, that took place on 23 and 24 November 1963 were all affected by heavy rain, keeping the attendances low and the playing fields damaged. Due to the condition of the grounds, the match between Odense KFUM and Knabstrup IF scheduled to take place at Odense Stadium had to be moved to Odense Athletics Stadium, while the match between B 1901 and AIA was moved from Nykøbing Falster Idrætspark to B 1901's own training ground. The cup match between BK Frem and B 1913 was originally scheduled to take place on Sunday 24 November 1963 at Københavns Idrætspark under floodlight, but the playing field was so badly damaged following Saturday's cup match between Akademisk BK and Kjøbenhavns BK, that the game had to be cancelled Sunday morning. The players and management of the Odense-based team was informed about the cancellation while crossing the Great Belt using the Halsskov-Knudshoved ferry, and hence turned the player's bus around, when they reached the Zealand side to return to their home city. Match highlights from the game between B 1909 and Esbjerg KFUM were broadcast the same evening on Danmarks Radio's primary news broadcast, named Aktuelt.

6 October 1963	BK Rødovre (3)	0–1	Randers SK Freja (2)	Rødovre
09:30 CET			Ole Nielsen 70'	Stadium: Rødovre Stadium; Attendance: 300

22 October 1963	B 1909 (1)	12–1	Esbjerg KFUM (5)	Odense
19:00 CET	Palle Kähler 11', 16'; John Danielsen 14', 23'; Mogens Berg 40'; Mogens Haastrup 48', 64', 74', 87'; Svend Aage Rask 72' (pen.); Arno Hansen 85'; Palle Hansen 90'		Svend Strandsberg 32'	Stadium: Odense Stadium; Attendance: 989; Referee: Tage Nielsen (Dalum)

31 October 1963	Brønshøj BK (1)	4–1	Frederiksborg IF (5)	Østerbro, Copenhagen
19:30 CET	Jørgen Petersen 8', 42', 43'; Erik Nielsen 50'		Bent Sonne Nielsen 88'	Stadium: Østerbro Stadium; Attendance: 1,100

23 November 1963	Akademisk BK (1)	4–1	Kjøbenhavns BK (1)	Østerbro, Copenhagen
16:00 CET	Ove Carlsen 20', 52'; Finn Wiberg 42'; Henning Stilling 79'		Hans Christensen 58'	Stadium: Københavns Idrætspark; Attendance: 4,300

24 November 1963	BK Fremad Valby (5)	1–5	Esbjerg fB (1)	Valby, Copenhagen
09:30 CET			Carl Bertelsen 4'; John Madsen 12' (o.g.); Knud Petersen 29', 35', 68' (pen.); Carl Emil Christiansen 72'	Stadium: Valby Idrætspark; Attendance: 1,200; Referee: Kay Bergsler

24 November 1963	Vanløse IF (2)	1–2 (a.e.t.)	Hvidovre IF (3)	Vanløse, Copenhagen
10:00 CET	Finn Laudrup 5'		Leif Sørensen 24'; John Steen Olsen 95'	Stadium: Vanløse Idrætspark; Attendance: 1,530

24 November 1963	Lyngby BK (3)	0–5	Vejle BK (1)	Kongens Lyngby
10:00 CET	Carsten Hansen 48' (o.g.)		Helge Jensen 5', 85'; Niels Erik Andersen 38'; Poul Bilde 80'	Stadium: Lyngby Stadium; Attendance: 744; Referee: Hans Asmussen

24 November 1963	Viborg FF (2)	2–3	Aarhus GF (1)	Viborg
13:00 CET	Finn Døssing 5'; John Olesen 89'		Kjeld Jensen 35'; Ove Sørensen 65'; Jørn Bjerregaard 84'	Stadium: Viborg Stadium; Attendance: 2,400; Referee: Børge Olsen (Aalborg)

24 November 1963	Odense KFUM (2)	8–3	Knabstrup IF (6)	Odense
13:15 CET	Helge Jørgensen 9', 24' (pen.); Kaj Peter Larsen 20', 63'; Tommy Madsen 27'; Carsten Wiingreen 47'; Jørgen Nielsen 59', 72'		Per Frederiksen 60'; Fritz Svendsen 62'; Arne Dyhrholm 65'	Stadium: Odense Athletics Stadium (Note: The match between Odense KFUM and Knabstrup IF was originally scheduled to take place at Odense Stadium, but was moved to Odense Athletics Stadium due to the ground's condition after a heavy rainfall.); Attendance: 300; Referee: Kaj Rasmussen (JBU)

24 November 1963	Aalborg BK (1)	0–1 (a.e.t.)	Roskilde BK (3)	Aalborg
13:30 CET			Jørgen Schink 97'	Stadium: Aalborg Stadium; Attendance: 1,100; Referee: Tage Sørensen (Vejle)

24 November 1963	B 1901 (1)	2–1	AIA (3)	Nykøbing Falster
13:30 CET	Jørn Nielsen 24'; Niels Erik Rasmussen 51'		Finn Thygesen 70'	Stadium: B 1901's baner (Note: Due to heavy rain, Nykøbing Falster Idrætspark was unfit to host the match between B 1901 and AIA, and was hence moved to B 1901's own training ground.); Attendance: 1,070; Referee: Søren E. Hansen (Sakskøbing)

24 November 1963	Ikast FS (2)	1–2	Køge BK (1)	Ikast
13:30 CET	Peter Märcher 15'		Kjeld Petersen 18', 23'	Stadium: Ikast Stadium; Attendance: 500; Referee: Bjarne Redlich (Aarhus)

24 November 1963	B.93 (2)	2–1	Odense BK (2)	Vanløse, Copenhagen
13:30 CET	Svend Petersen 5'; Lindy Olsen 55'		Finn Normann Rasmussen 76'	Stadium: Vanløse Idrætspark; Attendance: 1,800; Referee: Svend Maes

24 November 1963	Horsens FS (2)	3–2	Vejen SF (6)	Horsens
13:30 CET	Kaj Rasmussen 50'; Knud Larsen 55'; Finn Gertsen 88'		Egon Andreasen 20', 75'	Stadium: Horsens Stadium; Attendance: 1,400; Referee: Bredsgaard Nielsen (Kjellerup)

24 November 1963	Vorup Frederiksberg BK (4)	2–1	B 1903 (1)	Frederiksberg, Randers
13:30 CET	William Fahlberg 27' (pen.)		Ivan Hattens 18'; Børge Rasmussen 78' (o.g.)	Stadium: Frederiksberg Stadium; Attendance: 350; Referee: Tage Nielsen (Dalum)

1 December 1963	BK Frem (2)	0–1	B 1913 (1)	Østerbro, Copenhagen
13:00 CET			Ole Steffensen 20'	Stadium: Københavns Idrætspark; Attendance: 6,200; Referee: Frølich Nilsson (Copenhagen)

== Fourth round proper ==
The 16 winners of the third round progressed to the fourth round, that was scheduled to take place on 1 December 1963. The draw for this round took place at the offices of the Danish FA at Københavns Idrætspark in the afternoon of 25 November 1963, following the conclusion of the BK Frem versus B 1913 match. The Randers suburban club Vorup Frederiksberg BK was the only remaining team from a league outside the three top divisional structure, while half of the participants in this round was from the 1963 Danish 1st Division.

30 November 1963	Akademisk BK (1)	1–0	B 1901 (1)	Østerbro, Copenhagen
16:00 CET	Finn Wiberg 46'			Stadium: Københavns Idrætspark; Attendance: 3,200; Referee: Gunnar Michaelsen (Copenhagen)

30 November 1963	B 1909 (1)	3–0	Roskilde BK (3)	Odense
18:00 CET	Mogens Haastrup 60', 75'; Arno Hansen 65' (pen.)			Stadium: Odense Stadium; Attendance: 1,008; Referee: Frede Hansen (Dalum)

1 December 1963	Hvidovre IF (3)	1–8	Aarhus GF (1)	Hvidovre
10:00 CET	Lars Bo Henriksen 30'		Bruno Jensen 9', 81'; Johnny Bjerregaard 10', 34', 65', 83'; Henning Enoksen 44' (pen.), 68'	Stadium: Hvidovre Stadium; Attendance: 3,900; Referee: Ejnar Poulsen

1 December 1963	Esbjerg fB (1)	2–1	Vorup Frederiksberg BK (4)	Esbjerg
13:00 CET	Egon Jensen 4'; Eigil Frandsen 55'		Poul Erik Jacobsen 27'	Stadium: Esbjerg Stadium; Attendance: 4,000; Referee: Kaj Rasmussen (JBU)

1 December 1963	Køge BK (1)	0–0 (a.e.t.) (3–2 p)	B.93 (2)	Køge
13:00 CET				Stadium: Køge Stadium; Attendance: 1,750; Referee: Carl W. Hansen (Slagelse)
	Penalties
	Ole Jørgensen (penalty scored); Keld Pedersen (penalty scored); Ove Nielsen (penalty missed); Egon Rasmussen (penalty scored)		(penalty scored) Jørgen Jacobsen; (penalty missed) Hans Hansen; (penalty scored) Walther Jensen; (penalty missed) Svend Petersen

1 December 1963	Odense KFUM (2)	3–0	Brønshøj BK (1)	Odense
13:00 CET	Karsten Wiingreen 25', 62'; Helge Jørgensen 29'			Stadium: Odense Stadium; Attendance: 450; Referee: Valdemar Hansen

1 December 1963	Randers SK Freja (2)	2–4	Vejle BK (1)	Randers
13:00 CET	Bent Schmidt 47'; Ole Nielsen 52'		Tommy Troelsen 59'; Helge Jensen 62'; Carsten Lund 76', 78'	Stadium: Randers Stadium; Attendance: 2,900; Referee: Tage Sørensen (Vejle)

8 December 1963	Horsens FS (2)	0–3	B 1913 (1)	Horsens
13:30 CET	Erik Pedersen 85' (o.g.)		Ole Steffensen 33'; Niels Christian Nielsen 77'	Stadium: Horsens Idrætspark; Attendance: 3,041; Referee: Frølich Nilsson (Copenhagen)

== Quarter-finals ==
The eight winners of the previous round progressed to the quarterfinals. The draw for the quarterfinals took place on 1 December 1963, after the conclusion of the BK Frem vs. B 1913 match, and was handled by the board of the Danish FA and its competition's committee. Referee Frede Hansen (Dalum), assigned to the match between Odense KFUM and Aarhus GF, refused have the match played on 8 December 1963 due to a dangerous frost plagued football field and it was postponed to the spring of 1964. B 1909 and Esbjerg fB also both agreed to play their quarterfinal match scheduled for December 1963 in the upcoming spring instead. The first match of the 1964 was originally scheduled to take place on 22 March at Køge Stadium between Køge BK and B 1913, but was postponed four days due to the weather conditions (large snowdrifts and rim).

8 December 1963	Akademisk BK (1)	4–0	Vejle BK (1)	Østerbro, Copenhagen
13:15 CET	Ove Carlsen 20', 56' (pen.), 61' (pen.); Leif Hammer 81'			Stadium: Københavns Idrætspark; Attendance: 5,300; Referee: Kjeld Svanevig

26 March 1964	Køge BK (2)	5–5 (a.e.t.) (2–4 p)	B 1913 (1)	Køge
13:30 CET	Keld Pedersen 25', 117'; Egon Rasmussen 34', 52'; Poul Nielsen 75'		Ole Steffensen 28'; Niels Christian Nielsen 35', 104'; Ib Mortensen 70' (pen.); Jørgen Rasmussen 88'	Stadium: Køge Stadium; Attendance: 2,500; Referee: Tage Sørensen (Vejle)
	Penalties
	Ole Jørgensen (penalty missed); Ove Nielsen (penalty scored); Hans Andersen (penalty missed); Keld Pedersen (penalty scored)		(penalty scored) Erik Nielsen; (penalty scored) Finn Hellweg; (penalty scored) Eigil Misser; (penalty scored) Ib Mortensen

8 April 1964	Odense KFUM (2)	3–1	Aarhus GF (1)	Odense
19:30 CET	Freddy Hansen 20'; Helge Jørgensen 74', 76'		Jørn Bjerregaard 32'	Stadium: Odense Stadium; Attendance: 4,800; Referee: Frede Hansen (Dalum)

15 April 1964	B 1909 (1)	0–2	Esbjerg fB (1)	Odense
20:00 CET			Egon Jensen 20'; Knud Petersen 62' (pen.)	Stadium: Odense Stadium; Attendance: 16,420; Referee: Gunnar Michaelsen (Copenhagen)

== Semi-finals ==
The four winners of the quarter-finals progressed to the semi-finals. The draw for the semifinals took place on 1 March 1964 at the Danish FA's representative cabinet meeting in Aalborg. Match highlights from both semi-finals were broadcast the following evening on Danmarks Radio's primary news broadcast, named Sportsorientering.

22 April 1964	Odense KFUM (2)	3–2 (a.e.t.)	B 1913 (1)	Odense
19:00 CET	Helge Jørgensen 17', 26', 104'		Eigil Misser 16', 81'	Stadium: Odense Stadium; Attendance: 9,200; Referee: Tage Sørensen (Vejle)

24 April 1964	Akademisk BK (1)	1–4	Esbjerg fB (1)	Østerbro, Copenhagen
13:30 CET	Henning Stilling 47'		Knud Petersen 69'; Carl Emil Christiansen 80', 85'; Carl Bertelsen 82'	Stadium: Københavns Idrætspark; Attendance: 16,900; Referee: Carl W. Hansen (Slagelse)

== Final ==
7 May 1964
13:30 CET

Esbjerg fB	2–1	Odense KFUM
Carl Bertelsen 63'; Bjarne Kikkenborg 71'		Niels Erik Kildemoes 83'

Københavns Idrætspark, Copenhagen
Attendance: 24,500
Referee: Carl W. Hansen (Slagelse)
