= 1964 Danish 2nd Division =

Danish 2nd Division
- Season: 1964
- Dates: 29 March – November 1964
- Champions: Hvidovre IF (1st title)
- Promoted: Hvidovre IF; Aalborg BK
- Relegated: Vanløse IF; Randers SK Freja
- Matches: 132
- Goals: 492 (3.73 per match)
- Top goalscorer: Helge Jørgensen (24 goals)
- Biggest home win: Randers SK Freja 9–1 Horsens FS (1964)
- Biggest away win: Næstved IF 1–7 Hvidovre IF (3 or 4 October 1964)
- Highest scoring: Næstved IF 5–5 Horsens FS (3 May 1964); Randers SK Freja 9–1 Horsens FS (1964)

The 1964 Danish 2nd Division (Danish: Danmarksturneringens 2. division 1964) was the twenty-ninth season of the Danish second-tier association football division since the establishment of Danmarksturneringen's nation-wide league structure in 1927. Governed by the Danish FA, the season was launched on 29 March 1964, with the match between Ikast FS and Vanløse IF, and the last round of matches concluded in November 1964. Aalborg BK and Køge BK entered as relegated teams from last season's top-flight, while Hvidovre IF and Næstved IF entered as promoted teams from the 1963 Danish 3rd Division. Fixtures for the 1964 season were announced in February 1964.

Hvidovre IF won the league, securing their third promotion in a row after having entered second-tier league for the first time in the club's history, with Aalborg BK becoming the runners-up and returning immediately to the top-flight in the 1965 Danish 1st Division. At the end of the season, the two clubs with the fewest points in the final league standings, Vanløse IF and Randers SK Freja, were relegated to the 1965 Danish 3rd Division. Helge Jørgensen of Odense KFUM became the league's top scorer, netting a total of 24 goals.

== Summary ==
The 1964 season was inaugurated on 29 March with a single Easter Sunday match between Ikast FS, that finished the 1963 Danish 2nd Division season in ninth place, and Vanløse IF, that finished in tenth place last season, at Ikast Stadium in front of a crowd of 1,200 spectators. Ikast FS' centerforward Jørgen Nielsen scored the first goal of the season in the 11th minute after a pass from Kristian Mosegaard and scored additional two goals after 34 and 80 minutes of play, hence also completing the first hat-trick of the season. The remaining fixture for the first matchday was held on 30 March 1964.

On 26 April 1964, the game between Hvidovre IF and Odense KFUM became the first live television transmission by Danmarks Radio from a domestic competitive match in the Danmarksturneringen i fodbold. The league match, played at Hvidovre Stadium with an attendance of 4,850 spectators, was won 2-1 by the Copenhagen suburban-based club. Over 1 million television viewers nationwide tuned to watch the match that was shown in its full length at 18:00 CET until approx. 19:45 CET.

== Teams ==
Twelve teams competed in the league – eight teams from the previous season, two teams relegated from the top tier and two teams promoted from the third tier. The promoted teams were Hvidovre IF, who entered the second-tier league for the first time in the club's history, and Næstved IF, returning after a three-year absence. They replaced Skovshoved IF and Hellerup IK, ending their second-tier spells of two and three years respectively. The relegated teams were Aalborg BK, returning after one season, and Køge BK, returning after a three-year absence, replacing BK Frem and B.93, who returned to the top-flight division, ending their spells in the second-tier of three and four years respectively.

=== Stadiums and locations ===
Locations of the 1964 Danish 2nd Division teams.

Club	Location	Stadium	Capacity	Ref
Frederikshavn fI	Frederikshavn	Frederikshavn Stadium	25,000	
Horsens FS	Horsens	Horsens Idrætspark		
Hvidovre IF	Hvidovre	Hvidovre Stadium	10,000	
Ikast FS	Ikast	Ikast Stadium		
Køge BK	Køge	Køge Stadium	14,000	
Næstved IF	Næstved	Næstved Stadium		
Odense BK	Odense	Odense Stadium	28,000	
Odense KFUM	Odense	Odense Stadium	28,000	
Randers SK Freja	Randers	Randers Stadium	25,000	
Vanløse IF	Vanløse, Copenhagen	Vanløse Idrætspark	5,000	
Viborg FF	Viborg	Viborg Stadium	18,000	
Aalborg BK	Aalborg	Aalborg Stadium	22,000	

=== Personnel ===
Team	Head coach (Note: The line-up for each game was decided by members of a match selection committee, referred to as udtagelseskomite (UK) or spilleudvalg, while the coach was responsible for the physical training and game tactics. The rules stated that the coach was not allowed to instruct his players from the bench.)	Captain	Ref
Frederikshavn fI	(Denmark) Kaj Hansen		
Horsens FS	(Denmark) Laurids "Lause" Andersen		
Hvidovre IF	(Denmark) Bendt Jørgensen	(Denmark) Jørgen Jespersen	
Ikast FS	(Denmark) Immanuel Poulsen		
Køge BK	(Italy) Mario Astorri		
Næstved IF	(Hungary) József Kovács		
Odense BK	(Denmark) Richard Møller Nielsen		
Odense KFUM	(Denmark) Ole Petersen	(Denmark) Bent Johansen	
Randers SK Freja	(Denmark) Carlo Bendtsen		
Vanløse IF	(Hungary) Tivadar Szentpetery (Note: Tivadar Szentpetery was contractually employed from 1 January 1964 until his resignation on 29 September 1964.) (Denmark) Henning Westergaard (Note: Henning Westergaard took over as coach on 29 September 1964 for the remaining part of the season.)		
Viborg FF	(Austria) Rudi Strittich	(Denmark) Erik Bundgaard (Denmark) Helge Larsen	
Aalborg BK	(Finland) Kaarlo Niilonen	(Denmark) Kjeld Thorst	

=== Coaching changes ===
Team	Outgoing coach	Manner of departure	Date of vacancy	Position in table	Incoming coach	Date of appointment	Ref
Horsens FS	(Denmark) Erik Knudsen	End of contract	31 December 1963	Pre-season	(Denmark) Laurids "Lause" Andersen	1 January 1964	
Køge BK	(Denmark) Edvin Hansen	End of contract	31 December 1963	Pre-season	(Italy) Mario Astorri	1 January 1964	
Vanløse IF	(Denmark) Henning Westergaard	End of caretaker spell	31 December 1963	Pre-season	(Hungary) Tivadar Szentpetery	1 January 1964	
Viborg FF	(Denmark) Leo Thorvald Nielsen	End of contract	31 December 1963	Pre-season	(Austria) Rudi Strittich	1 January 1964	
Vanløse IF	(Hungary) Tivadar Szentpetery	Resigned	29 September 1964	11th	(Denmark) Henning Westergaard	29 September 1964	

== League table ==
Every team played two games against the other teams, at home and away, totaling 22 games each. Teams received two points for a win and one point for a draw. If two or more teams were tied on points, places were determined by goal average. The team with the most points were crowned winners of the league. The winners and the runners-up were promoted to the 1965 Danish 1st Division, while the two teams with the fewest points would be relegated to the 1965 Danish 3rd Division.

Pos	Team	Pld	W	D	L	GF	GA	GR	Pts	Promotion, qualification or relegation
1	Hvidovre IF (C, P)	22	15	3	4	61	21	2.905	33	Promotion to the 1965 Danish 1st Division
2	Aalborg BK (P)	22	14	3	5	56	32	1.750	31	Promotion to the 1965 Danish 1st Division
3	Odense KFUM	22	12	6	4	49	32	1.531	30	
4	Viborg FF	22	9	7	6	53	50	1.060	25	
5	Odense BK	22	10	5	7	48	51	0.941	25	
6	Frederikshavn fI	22	7	6	9	35	42	0.833	20	
7	Ikast FS	22	8	4	10	34	42	0.810	20	
8	Næstved IF	22	7	4	11	40	54	0.741	18	
9	Køge BK	22	5	7	10	40	44	0.909	17	
10	Horsens FS	22	4	9	9	40	56	0.714	17	
11	Vanløse IF (R)	22	6	4	12	39	43	0.907	16	Relegation to the 1965 Danish 3rd Division
12	Randers SK Freja (R)	22	4	4	14	37	65	0.569	12	Relegation to the 1965 Danish 3rd Division

Rules for classification: 1) Points 2) Goal average
(C) Champions; (P) Promoted; (R) Relegated

== Results ==
Home \ Away	FFI	HFS	HIF	IFS	KBK	NIF	OBK	KFU	RSF	VIF	VFF	AAB
Frederikshavn fI	—	1–1	2–1	4–4	2–2	1–2	2–3	0–3	1–2	4–1	1–1	1–5
Horsens FS	2–2	—	2–3	2–2	5–2	3–1	0–3	2–4	2–1	0–5	1–2	3–4
Hvidovre IF	4–1	0–0	—	6–0	1–0	2–0	2–0	2–1	6–2	4–0	6–1	0–1
Ikast FS	1–0	1–0	0–2	—	2–1	1–2	1–1	1–3	1–3	3–1	3–2	1–2
Køge BK	3–1	1–1	1–1	2–1	—	4–0	2–4	2–2	3–0	1–2	1–3	1–5
Næstved IF	1–1	5–5	1–7	1–2	2–1	—	2–3	1–1	7–2	4–3	3–6	0–1
Odense BK	0–3	3–3	3–2	2–1	2–1	3–1	—	0–3	7–2	0–4	2–2	2–2
Odense KFUM	3–1	3–2	0–2	2–2	2–1	3–1	2–4	—	4–2	3–1	1–1	3–0
Randers SK Freja	0–1	9–1	0–4	1–3	2–2	0–2	4–4	0–0	—	1–0	0–2	2–7
Vanløse IF	0–1	1–2	1–2	1–2	2–2	1–3	4–1	1–1	1–1	—	4–2	1–0
Viborg FF	3–4	3–3	3–2	2–1	3–3	1–1	2–1	4–2	5–2	2–2	—	1–2
Aalborg BK	0–1	0–0	2–2	2–1	1–4	3–0	6–0	2–3	2–1	4–3	5–2	—

Legend: Blue = home team win; Yellow = draw; Red = away team win.

== Statistics ==
=== Scoring ===
==== Top scorers ====
Rank	Player	Club	Goals
1	(Denmark) Helge Jørgensen	Odense KFUM	24
2	(Denmark) Per Bartram	Odense BK	22
3	(Denmark) Kurt Berthelsen	Hvidovre IF	20
4	(Denmark) Kjeld Thorst	Aalborg BK	19
5	(Denmark) Finn Døssing	Viborg FF	17
6	(Denmark) Leif Sørensen	Hvidovre IF	15
7	(Denmark) Lars Bo Henriksen	Hvidovre IF	14
7	(Denmark) Erik Dyreborg	Næstved IF	14
9	(Denmark) Flemming Petersen	Frederikshavn fI	12
9	(Denmark) Freddy Hansen	Odense KFUM	12
11	(Denmark) Jørgen Nielsen	Ikast FS	11
11	(Denmark) Jens Flou	Aalborg BK	11
13	(Denmark) Flemming Iversen	Odense BK	10
13	(Denmark) Helge Larsen	Viborg FF	10

==== Hat-tricks ====
Player	For	Against	Result	Date	Ref
(Denmark) Jørgen Nielsen	Ikast FS	Vanløse IF	3–1 (H)	29 March 1964	
(Denmark) Kurt Berthelsen	Hvidovre IF	Frederikshavn fI	4–1 (H)	12 April 1964	
(Denmark) Lars Bo Henriksen	Hvidovre IF	Ikast FS	6–0 (H)	17 May 1964	
(Denmark) Lars Bo Henriksen	Hvidovre IF	Viborg FF	6–1 (H)	1 June 1964	
(Denmark) Erik Dyreborg	Næstved IF	Randers SK Freja	7–2 (H)	23 August 1964	
(Denmark) Leif Sørensen	Hvidovre IF	Randers SK Freja	6–2 (H)	27 September 1964	
(Denmark) Kurt Berthelsen	Hvidovre IF	Randers SK Freja	6–2 (H)	27 September 1964	
(Denmark) Leif Sørensen	Hvidovre IF	Næstved IF	7–1 (A)	4 October 1964	
(Denmark) Kurt Berthelsen	Hvidovre IF	Næstved IF	7–1 (A)	4 October 1964	

=== Clean sheets ===
Rank	Player	Club	Matches	Clean sheets	Ref
—	(Denmark) John Worbye	Hvidovre IF	22	9	
—	(Denmark) Mogens Johansen	Køge BK	22	2	
—	(Denmark) Frank Madsen	Næstved IF	4	1	
