= Arne Sørensen (Danish footballer) =

Danish footballer and coach (1917–1977)

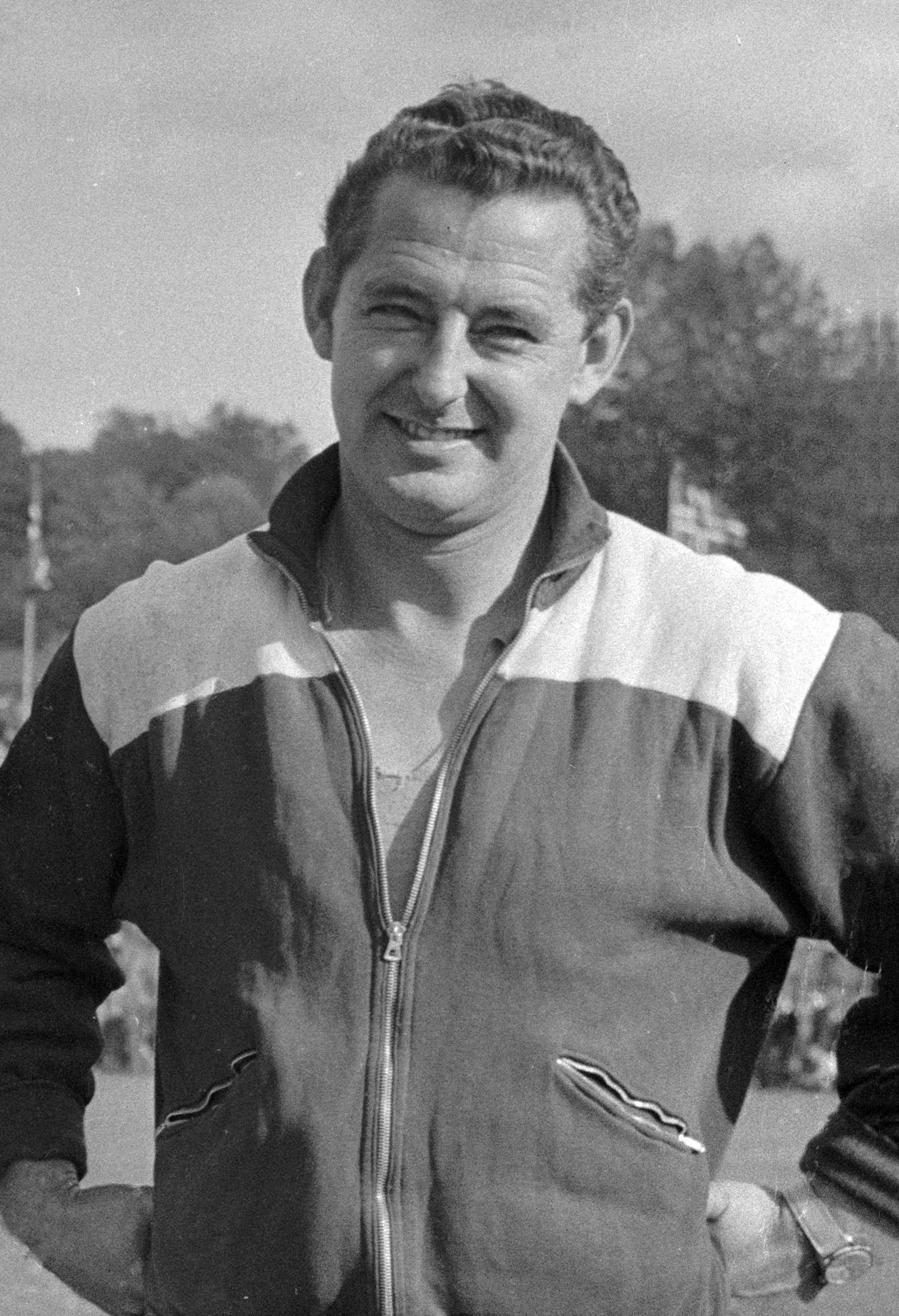
- Arne Sørensen in 1959

Personal information
- Full name: Arne Sørensen
- Date of birth: 27 November 1917
- Place of birth: Copenhagen, Denmark
- Date of death: 1 May 1977 (aged 59)
- Place of death: Gentofte, Denmark
- Position: Midfielder

Senior career*
Years	Team	Apps	(Gls)
–1940	B 1903		
1941–1946	B 93		
1947–1948	Stade Français FC	25	(1)
1948–1949	FC Nancy	17	(1)

International career
1937–1946	Denmark	30	(4)

Managerial career
- Skovshoved IF
- AB
- 1956–1961: Denmark
- 1963–1964: Esbjerg fB
- KB
- 1972–1973: Hvidovre IF
- 1974–1976: BK Fremad Amager
- * Club domestic league appearances and goals

Arne Sørensen (27 November 1917 – 1 May 1977) was a Danish association football player and coach. During his career as an athlete, Sørensen won three Danish championships with Boldklubben 1893 and Boldklubben 1893, before moving abroad to play professionally in French football. As a midfielder for the Denmark national football team, he played 30 games and scored four goals. As a coach, Sørensen won silver medals with the Danish national team at the 1960 Summer Olympics, and also won the Danish championship with Esbjerg fB, Kjøbenhavns Boldklub, and Hvidovre IF.

== Playing career ==
Born in Copenhagen, Sørensen began playing football with local top-flight club Boldklubben 1903 (B 1903) in the amateur-only Danish championship. Sørensen was a quick and strong player, with great style and an accurate shot, playing in the central midfielder (centre-half) position. He made his debut for the Denmark national football team in September 1937, and played 16 national team games while at B 1903. Sørensen won the 1938 Danish football championship with B 1903, before moving to rival Copenhagen club Boldklubben 1893 (B 93) in 1941, with whom he won a further two Danish championships.

Sørensen played an additional 14 national team games while at B 93, and managed to play in all defensive positions except goalkeeper for the national team. He played a total 30 national team games until September 1946. In 1946, Sørensen and fellow Danish international Kaj Hansen were offered 5,000 DKK each to move to rival club Skovshoved IF, in violation of the strict rule of amateurism. The Danish Football Association discovered the offer and declared Sørensen professional, thus banning him from playing in Danish football.

Sørensen moved abroad to play professionally in French football, though his time in France was not a success. As a professional footballer, he lost his eligibility to play for the amateur-only Danish national team, and could not compete for Denmark at the imminent 1948 Olympics football tournament. Sørensen and Kaj Hansen signed with Stade Français FC in the top-flight French Division 1 championship, where they played alongside fellow Dane Børge Mathiesen. He stayed one season at Stade Français, playing 25 games and scoring one goal to help the club finish fifth in the 1947–48 Division 1 season. After the season, he moved to league rival FC Nancy, to play alongside fellow Dane Helge Bronée. Sørensen played 17 games and scored one goal as Nancy finished 15th in the 1948–49 Division 1 season, after which he ended his playing career.

== Coaching career ==
Sørensen started his coaching career with Danish clubs Skovshoved IF and Akademisk Boldklub. In the summer of 1957, Sørensen was hired as full-time Danish national team manager, though he had already coached the team for two games in November 1956. His coaching focus was on tactical training and physical conditioning. His most notable success as a coach came at the 1960 Summer Olympics, where as manager he led the Danish team to silver medals in the 1960 Olympics football tournament, losing 1–3 to Yugoslavia in the final. He was national team manager in 41 games, winning 20 and losing 13. Sørensen ended his tenure as Danish national team manager in November 1961, as he did not agree with the additional role as motivational speaker for Danish clubs demanded by the Danish Football Association.

From 1963 to 1964, Sørensen was appointed head coach of Esbjerg fB in the top-flight Danish 1st Division championship. He coached Esbjerg to the 1963 1st Division championship, and the 1963-64 Danish Cup trophy. He later coached Kjøbenhavns Boldklub and Hvidovre IF to the 1968 and 1973 1st Division championships respectively. Sørensen was head coach for Fremad Amager from 1974 until October 1976.

== Championship titles ==
- Danish championship (6): 1938, 1942, 1946, 1963, 1968, 1973
- Danish Cup: 1964
