= Jens Jørn Bertelsen =

Danish footballer (born 1952)

Jens Bertelsen
Personal information
- Full name: Jens Jørn Haahr Bertelsen
- Date of birth: 15 February 1952 (age 74)
- Place of birth: Guldager, Denmark
- Height: 5 ft 7 in (1.70 m)
- Position: Defensive midfielder

Youth career
- Sædding-Guldager

Senior career*
Years	Team	Apps	(Gls)
1973–1982	Esbjerg fB	317	(21)
1982–1984	R.F.C. Seraing	59	(3)
1984–1985	FC Rouen	35	(4)
1985–1986	FC Aarau	49	(0)
1987–1988	Esbjerg fB	45	(?)

International career
1975	Denmark u21	5	(0)
1976–1987	Denmark	69	(2)
- * Club domestic league appearances and goals

Jens Jørn Haahr Bertelsen (born 15 February 1952), known as Jens Jørn Bertelsen and Sjønne, is a Danish former association football player in the defensive midfielder position. He played 362 matches and scored 42 goals for Danish club Esbjerg fB, and played for a number of European clubs. He played 69 matches and scored two goals for the Denmark national football team, and represented Denmark at the UEFA Euro 1984 and 1986 FIFA World Cup tournaments.

== Club career ==
Born in the Esbjerg suburb of Guldager, Bertelsen started playing football with small-time club Sædding-Guldager. When Sædding-Guldager coach and former Danish international Egon Jensen was hired by 3rd Division team Esbjerg fB, Bertelsen followed him to the club, where he played alongside later Danish internationals Ole Kjær, Ole Madsen, and John Lauridsen. He made his Esbjerg debut at the age of 21, on 1 April 1973. He was a hard-working defensive midfielder, and helped the team win promotion to the top-flight Danish 1st Division. In 1976, he was named man of the match as Esbjerg won the Danish Cup tournament, Esbjerg's first trophy in 11 years. In the 1st Division, Bertelsen helped Esbjerg finish third in 1977, second in 1978, and finally win the 1979 Danish football championship. He was subsequently named 1979 Danish Player of the Year by the Danish Football Association.

He received a number of offers from European clubs, and decided to move abroad in May 1982. He signed a professional contract with Belgian club R.F.C. Seraing, and quickly settled into the team. He stayed two years in Belgium, before moving on to French outfit Rouen FC when Seraing went bankrupt in 1984. After one season with relegation battlers Rouen, he moved to Swiss team FC Aarau in the summer of 1985. Bertelsen returned to Esbjerg fB in 1987, where he ended his career at the end of the 1988 season.

== International career ==
Bertelsen made his international debut with the Denmark national under-21 football team in May 1975, and played five under-21 games until October 1975. He was called up for the senior Danish national team by national manager Kurt "Nikkelaj" Nielsen, and made his national team debut in a 0–0 draw with Norway on 24 June 1976.

He played his second game in February 1978, and went on to become a mainstay in the team under new national manager Sepp Piontek. Bertelsen had a somewhat anonymous role in the defensive midfield, though his work rate made him an integral part of the team. While playing abroad, Bertelsen was called up by Piontek to represent Denmark at the UEFA Euro 1984. He played full-time in all Denmark's four games before elimination in the semi-finals. He was also called up for the Danish squad at the 1986 FIFA World Cup. He played three of Denmark's four games at the tournament. He played his last national team game in September 1987, at the age of 35.

== Honours ==
- 1976 Danish Cup
- 1979 Danish football championship
- 1979 Danish Player of the Year
