= Carl W. Hansen =

Danish football referee and linesman

- Full name: Carl Werner Hansen
- Born: Slagelse, Denmark
- Other occupation: Affairs manager

Domestic
Years	League	Role
195?–196?	Danmarksturneringen	Referee

International
Years	League	Role
1962–1969	FIFA listed	Referee

Carl Werner Hansen (born in Slagelse), commonly known as Carl W. Hansen, is a Danish former football referee and linesman, who officiated in the Danish top-flight, second-tier and third-tier including lower ranking leagues in the 1950s and 1960s and in both European and UEFA sanctioned club tournaments. From 1962 until 1969, he was a full international for FIFA, and officiated international friendlies and competitive games at senior, secondary 'B' team and under-19 level.

== Career ==
Born in Slagelse, Hansen became affiliated with the Zealand FA (SBU) and the regional referee organisation, Sjællands Fodbolddommer-Union (SFU), as a referee, originally officiating lower ranking league matches at a regional level for the football association organising football on Zealand. He eventually moved up to a national level under the auspices of the Danish FA, supervising numerous top-tier Danish league games including cup matches in the 1950s and 1960s in a role as linesman and referee. He started officiating third-tier league matches sometime in the early 1950s, before moving up to second-tier and top-flight league games. Carl W. Hansen was assigned the role as linesman for the 1959 Danish Cup Final's replay match between Aarhus GF and Vejle BK. In the 1961–62 European Cup semi-final match between Tottenham Hotspur F.C. versus S.L. Benfica, he served as a linesmen with Aage Poulsen as the referee in the match. After having officiated the 1963–64 Danish Cup semi-final match in late April 1964 between Akademisk BK and Esbjerg fB, he was also designated the 1964 Danish Cup Final, featuring Esbjerg fB and Odense KFUM, as the referee by the Danish FA. He ended his domestic refereeing career in the top three league levels sometime in late 1969 or early 1970s, when he exceeded the then domestic age limit rule of 50 years, implemented in 1958 by the Football Referees Committee of the Danish FA.

At the Nordiske Konference held in Norway involving the four nordic football associations of Denmark, Finland, Norway and Sweden, a decision was made to allow experienced referees as linesmen in A, B side and youth (U) international matches, and Carl W. Hansen, Gunnar Michaelsen and Einer Poulsen were appointed for this purpose. He was appointed to the FIFA List on 24 June 1962 by the Danish FA as part of the association's then seven man large group of referees, appointed yearly, and could effectively start refereeing international matches beginning from 1 August 1962. He refereed several friendlies and international competitive games. His international assignments has included refereeing the match between Norway and Finland on 20 August 1964 as part of the 1964–67 Nordic Football Championship, serving as a linesman at the 'B' team friendly between Denmark and Sweden on 5 November 1966 and being a linesman at the Under-19 friendly between Denmark and Norway on 1 October 1960. He ended his tenure as FIFA referee on 31 July 1969.

== International matches ==
=== Assignments as referee ===
Date	Venue	Home team	Away team	Competition	Ref.
14 August 1963	?, Norway	Norway (B)	Sweden (B)	Friendly	
16 October 1963	Olympiastadion, West Berlin, Germany	(Germany) Hertha BSC	(Italy) AS Roma	1963–64 Inter-Cities Fairs Cup, first round, 1st leg	
2 August 1964	?, Sweden	Sweden (U)	Finland (U)	Friendly	
15 September 1964	Bislett stadion, Oslo, Norway	(Norway) Skeid Fotball	(Finland) Valkeakosken Haka	1964–65 European Cup Winners' Cup, 1st round, 1st leg	
22 August 1965	Skogsvallen, Luleå, Sweden	Sweden	Finland	1964–67 Nordic Football Championship	
26 April 1966	?, Sweden	Sweden (U)	East Germany (U)	?	
17 September 1966	?, Sweden	Sweden (B)	Norway (B)	?	
6 August 1967	Idrottsparken, Norrköping, Sweden	(Sweden) IFK Norrköping	(East Germany) 1. FC Lokomotive Leipzig	1967 Intertoto Cup, group B1 match	
13 July 1968	Olympia, Helsingborg, Sweden	(Sweden) Helsingborgs IF	(Switzerland) FC Biel-Bienne	1968 Intertoto Cup, group B1 match	
18 August 1968	Ullevaal Stadion, Oslo, Norway	Norway	(Sweden) Finland	1968–71 Nordic Football Championship	

=== Assignments as linesman ===
Date	Venue	Home team	Away team	Competition	Ref.
6 September 1959	Olympiastadion, Helsinki, Finland	Finland	East Germany	Friendly	
5 November 1959	Gamla Ullevi, Gothenburg, Sweden	(Sweden) IFK Göteborg	(Netherlands) Sparta Rotterdam	1959–60 European Cup, 1st round, 2nd leg	
31 August 1960	Fredrikstad Stadion, Fredrikstad, Norway	(Norway) Fredrikstad FK	(Netherlands) AFC Ajax	1960–61 European Cup, preliminary round, 1st leg	
7 September 1960	Olympisch Stadion, Amsterdam, Netherlands	(Netherlands) AFC Ajax	(Norway) Fredrikstad FK	1960–61 European Cup, preliminary round, 2nd leg	
19 October 1960	Müngersdorfer Stadion, Köln, Germany	(Germany) Köln XI	(France) Olympique Lyonnais	1960–61 Inter-Cities Fairs Cup, 1st round, 2nd leg	
9 August 1961	Idrottsparken, Norrköping, Sweden	Sweden	Finland	1960–63 Nordic Football Championship	
5 April 1962	White Hart Lane, London, England	(England) Tottenham Hotspur FC	(Portugal) SL Benfica	1961–62 European Cup, semi final, 2nd leg	
8 May 1969	Ullevaal Stadion, Oslo, Norway	Norway	Mexico	Friendly	
