= René Hansen =

Danish footballer

Personal information
- Full name: René Overgaard Hansen
- Date of birth: 18 April 1965 (age 61)
- Place of birth: Denmark
- Position: Midfielder

Senior career*
| Years | Team | Apps | (Gls) |
- Kjøbenhavns Boldklub
| 1986-1987 | UD Las Palmas | 7 | (0) |
- Brøndby IF
- FC Helsingør→(loan)
- Ikast FS→(loan)
| -1994/95 | Fremad Amager | 4+ | (0+) |
- * Club domestic league appearances and goals

René Hansen (born 18 April 1965 in Denmark) is a Danish retired footballer.
