= 1961–62 Danish Cup =

Tournament details
- Country: Denmark

Final positions
- Champions: B 1909
- Runners-up: Esbjerg fB

The 1961–62 Danish Cup was the 8th installment of the Danish Cup, the highest football competition in Denmark. The final was played on 31 May 1962.

== First round ==
Team 1	Score	Team 2
B 1908	0–1	Hvidovre IF
B 1921	0–4	Frederiksberg BK
Fredericia KFUM	3–1	Grenaa IF
FIF Hillerød	2–4 (a.e.t.)	Roskilde BK
Glostrup IC	5–0	Maribo BK
Grindsted G&IF	6–1	Skagen IK
Gentofte-Vangede IF	4–2	Skensved IF
Helsingør IF	9–0	Tuse Næs BK
Herning Fremad	4–3	Rudkøbing BK
Hjørring IF	5–1	Aarup BK
Hobro IK	4–1	Snedsted G&IF
Holeby IF	2–8	AIK Frederiksholm
Horsens fS	4–1	Aalborg Chang
Husum BK	3–1	Slagelse B&I
Hørsholm-Usserød IK	6–4 (a.e.t.)	Kalundborg GB
Lendemark BK	1–4	BK Rødovre
Lyngby BK	2–3	Herlev IF
Nyborg G&IF	3–1	Østre BK
Nykøbing Mors IF	0–2	Kolding IF
Silkeborg IF	3–2	Viborg FF
Svendborg fB	5–1	OKS
Sønderborg BK	1–3	IF Hasle Fuglebakken
Vanløse IF	4–0	Politiets IF
Varde BK	0–2	Brande IF
IK Viking Rønne	2–3	Fremad Amager
BK Viktoria	2–7	Næstved IF
Aalborg Freja	6–2	Skive IK
Aars IK	1–6	Bolbro G&IF

== Second round ==
Team 1	Score	Team 2
AB	2–0	Hvidovre IF
Brande IF	4–1	Husum BK
Brønshøj BK	2–0	B 1901
BK Frem	1–2	Hjørring IF
Glostrup IC	3–1	Frederiksberg BK
Grindsted G&IF	2–1	Roskilde BK
Gentofte-Vangede IF	0–3	Fremad Amager
Helsingør IF	4–1	Bolbro G&IF
Herlev IF	2–1	Svendborg fB
Herning Fremad	1–5	AaB
Hellerup	2–4	Kolding IF
Hobro IK	2–1	IF Hasle Fuglebakken
Horsens fS	1–0	Odense KFUM
Hørsholm-Usserød IK	2–5	Nyborg G&IF
Ikast FS	2–1	B.93
KFUM København	2–3	BK Rødovre
Næstved IF	4–2	Silkeborg IF
Randers Freja	9–0	Fredericia KFUM
Vanløse IF	4–3	AIK Frederiksholm
Aalborg Freja	0–1	Frem Sakskøbing

== Third round ==
Team 1	Score	Team 2
AB	5–0	Næstved IF
AGF	1–3 (a.e.t.)	Esbjerg fB
B 1903	5–2	Frem Sakskøbing
Brønshøj BK	3–0	Odense BK
Helsingør IF	2–1	Frederikshavn fI
Herlev IF	1–5	B 1909
Hobro IK	1–1 (a.e.t.) (7–6 p)	Hjørring IF
Horsens fS	3–1	BK Rødovre
Ikast FS	6–3	Brande IF
KB	3–2	Fremad Amager
Kolding IF	1–3	Vejle BK
Køge BK	1–0	B 1913
Randers Freja	2–0	Nyborg G&IF
Skovshoved IF	0–2	IF AIA-Tranbjerg
Vanløse IF	1–2	Grindsted G&IF
AaB	6–0	Glostrup IC

== Fourth round ==
Team 1	Score	Team 2
AB	5–2	AaB
IF AIA-Tranbjerg	5–1	Grindsted G&IF
B 1903	3–2	KB
Brønshøj BK	3–0	Horsens fS
Helsingør IF	3–2	Ikast FS
Hobro IK	1–11	B 1909
Randers Freja	1–5	Køge BK
Vejle BK	3–4 (a.e.t.)	Esbjerg fB

== Quarter-finals ==
Team 1	Score	Team 2
IF AIA-Tranbjerg	3–3 (a.e.t.) (5–4 p)	AB
B 1909	3–1	Køge BK
Brønshøj BK	0–4	Esbjerg fB
Helsingør IF	1–3	B 1903

== Semi-finals ==
Team 1	Score	Team 2
IF AIA-Tranbjerg	1–2 (a.e.t.)	B 1909
B 1903	0–1 (a.e.t.)	Esbjerg fB

== Final ==
31 May 1962

B 1909	1–0	Esbjerg fB
Hansen 70'	Report

Københavns Idrætspark, Copenhagen
Attendance: 18,000
Referee: Tage Sørensen
