= Egon Jensen =

Egon Jensen may refer to:

- Egon Jensen (footballer)
- Egon Jensen (politician)
