= Hans Jørgen Christiansen =

Danish footballer (born 1943)

Hans Jørgen Christensen
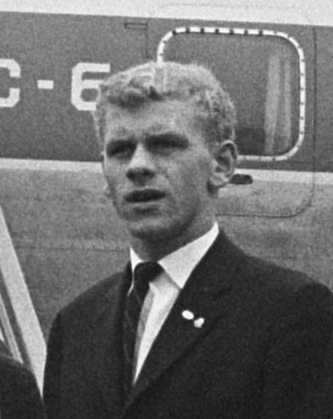
- Christiansen in 1963

Personal information
- Date of birth: 25 November 1943 (age 82)
- Place of birth: Fredericia, Denmark
- Position: Defender

Senior career*
| Years | Team | Apps | (Gls) |
| 1963–1970 | Esbjerg fB | | |

International career
| 1966 | Denmark B | 1 | (0) |
| 1968–1969 | Denmark | 5 | (0) |
- * Club domestic league appearances and goals

Hans Jørgen Christensen (born 25 November 1943) is a Danish former footballer who played as a defender for Esbjerg fB. He made five appearances for the Denmark national team from 1968 to 1969.
