= Kurt Berthelsen =

Danish footballer (born 1943)

Personal information
- Full name: Kurt Dalgaard Berthelsen
- Date of birth: 27 November 1943 (age 82)
- Place of birth: Nörre Tranders, Denmark
- Height: 1.80 m (5 ft 11 in)
- Position: Forward

Senior career*
Years	Team	Apps	(Gls)
1964–1966	Hvidovre IF		
1966–1973	AaB		

International career
1972	Denmark	1	(0)
- * Club domestic league appearances and goals

Kurt Dalgaard Berthelsen (born 27 November 1943) is a Danish former footballer who played as a forward for Hvidovre IF and AaB. He played in one match for the Denmark national team in 1972 and competed in the men's tournament at the 1972 Summer Olympics.
