= Kaarlo Niilonen =

Finnish football manager (1922–1996)

Personal information
- Date of birth: 3 June 1922
- Place of birth: Kotka, Finland
- Date of death: 24 February 1996 (aged 73)
- Place of death: Frederikshavn, Denmark
- Position: Midfielder

Senior career*
Years	Team	Apps	(Gls)
1939–1946	Kotkan Työväen Palloilijat		

International career
1943–1946	Finland	3	(0)

Managerial career
- 1954–1956: Solothurn
- 1957–1960: Viborg FF
- 1960–1970: Aalborg BK
- 1976–1978: Frederikshavn fI
- 1979: Hjørring AIK Frem
- * Club domestic league appearances and goals

Kaarlo Niilonen (3 June 1922 – 24 February 1996) was a Finnish football player and manager.
