= Jens Jørgen Hansen =

Danish footballer and manager (1939–2022)

Jens Jørgen Rankenberg-Hansen (4 January 1939 – 2 January 2022) was a Danish football player and manager.

== Career ==
He played 417 games as a defender for Esbjerg fB with whom he won four Danish football championships. He represented the Denmark national team in 39 games from 1962 to 1971, and was a part of the Denmark squad at the 1964 European Championship. After retiring, Hansen served as manager of Esbjerg fB for a short while in 1972. Hansen died on 2 January 2022, at the age of 82.

== Honours ==
Esbjerg fB

- Danish football championship: 1961, 1962, 1963 and 1965
- Danish Cup: 1964
