= 1968 Danish 1st Division =

23rd season of Danish 1st Division

Danish 1st Division
- Season: 1968

Statistics of Danish 1st Division in the 1968 season.

== Overview ==
It was contested by 12 teams, and Kjøbenhavns Boldklub won the championship.

== League standings ==
Pos	Team	Pld	W	D	L	GF	GA	GD	Pts
1	Kjøbenhavns Boldklub	22	13	3	6	50	26	+24	29
2	Esbjerg fB	22	12	5	5	41	25	+16	29
3	Boldklubben Frem	22	12	5	5	40	31	+9	29
4	Boldklubben 1913	22	11	5	6	37	29	+8	27
5	Vejle Boldklub	22	11	3	8	37	31	+6	25
6	Boldklubben 1909	22	9	5	8	36	41	−5	23
7	Aalborg Boldspilklub	22	7	7	8	37	35	+2	21
8	Hvidovre IF	22	8	4	10	30	28	+2	20
9	Akademisk Boldklub	22	9	2	11	28	32	−4	20
10	Horsens fS	22	7	6	9	27	35	−8	20
11	Odense Boldklub	22	6	3	13	24	33	−9	15
12	Aarhus Gymnastikforening	22	1	4	17	10	51	−41	6

== Results ==
Home \ Away	ABK	AaB	AGF	B09	B13	EFB	BKF	HOR	HIF	KBK	OB	VBK
Akademisk BK		3–1	3–0	2–2	0–2	1–2	0–3	0–2	1–0	0–1	2–1	3–6
Aalborg BK	2–1		3–0	0–0	3–0	1–2	3–3	1–1	0–2	1–2	3–1	1–2
Aarhus GF	1–0	0–2		0–2	0–2	0–0	1–2	0–0	1–2	0–3	0–1	0–2
B 1909	1–0	1–2	2–1		0–2	5–4	2–3	3–2	2–0	1–5	2–0	2–0
B 1913	1–2	3–3	4–2	3–1		1–0	1–1	2–2	2–1	1–1	3–1	3–0
Esbjerg fB	1–0	1–1	4–1	5–1	0–0		4–1	3–1	2–1	4–1	4–2	2–0
BK Frem	1–2	5–2	1–1	2–2	2–4	2–0		1–2	2–1	2–1	1–0	1–0
Horsens fS	1–2	0–3	1–1	2–2	2–1	2–0	2–3		1–0	0–0	2–1	2–1
Hvidovre IF	2–1	1–1	2–0	1–2	3–1	2–0	0–0	2–1		1–3	1–1	2–2
Kjøbenhavns BK	0–1	2–0	9–0	4–2	3–0	2–2	0–2	3–0	3–1		0–2	1–4
Odense BK	0–0	3–2	3–0	0–0	0–1	0–1	1–2	5–1	0–4	1–2		1–0
Vejle BK	2–4	2–2	3–1	3–1	2–0	0–0	2–0	1–0	2–1	1–4	2–0	

Legend: Blue = home team win; Yellow = draw; Red = away team win.
