= Ole Kjær =

Danish footballer (born 1954)

Personal information
- Date of birth: 16 August 1954 (age 72)
- Place of birth: Kolding, Denmark
- Height: 1.86 m (6 ft 1 in)
- Position: Goalkeeper

Youth career
- 1960–1962: Jerne IF
- 1962–1973: Esbjerg fB

Senior career*
Years	Team	Apps	(Gls)
1973–1986	Esbjerg fB	314	(0)
1986–1989	Næstved	95	(0)
1990–1992	Esbjerg fB	72	(0)
Total		481	(0)

International career
1975	Denmark U21	3	(0)
1977–1984	Denmark	26	(0)
- * Club domestic league appearances and goals

Ole Kjær (born 16 August 1954) is a Danish former footballer, who won the 1978 Danish Player of the Year award. He played as a goalkeeper, and most prominently represented Danish club Esbjerg fB, with whom he won the 1979 Danish Championship. He played 26 games for the Danish national team from 1977 to 1984, and represented Denmark at the 1984 European Championship.

== Club career ==
Kjær began his professional career in 1974 with Esbjerg fB. Two years after, he was able to win the Danish Cup with Esbjerg. This was their first victory in the tournament since 1964 and only the second in the club's history. The team won 2–1 against Holbæk B&I. In the 1978 season, Kjær and his team finished runners-up, four points behind title winners Vejle Boldklub. They reached the final of the cup again, but had to admit defeat after three 1–1 draws and a penalty shoot-out against Frem. In the same year he was voted Danish Football Player of the Year, succeeding OB's Allan Hansen. In the following season, the team managed to win the league title. With only two defeats and thirty goals conceded, Kjær's team recorded the best defence and finished six points ahead at first place in the league. As the defending champions, however, the club only came in a disappointing tenth place the following year. The sporting situation at Esbjerg did not improve in the coming years either. As the club relegated at the end of the 1986 season, Kjær decided to move to first division rivals Danish 1st Division rivals Næstved Boldklub. In 1990, however, he returned to Esbjerg fB, and retired two years later in 1992. With a total of 474 competitive matches for Esbjerg, Kjær holds the club record. On 11 April 1992, he replaced Jens Peter Hansen (465 games between 1943 and 1966) as the record holder.

== International career ==
Ole Kjær was a part of Danish national team manager Sepp Piontek's successful "Danish Dynamite" team in the early 1980s, where he competed for the starting goalkeeper spot with Ole Qvist and Troels Rasmussen. He played an important part as Denmark qualified for the 1984 European Championship. Especially the game against England at Wembley Stadium on 21 September 1983 saw Kjær make a number of saves, as Denmark beat England 1–0. After a 6–0 pre-tournament loss to the Netherlands, Kjær was replaced in the Danish goal by Ole Qvist, and he did not play any games at the 1984 European Championship main tournament.

== Outside football ==
Kjær is educated as a carpenter. He has worked six years in the sports business, sold holiday homes at Club La Santa for Tjæreborg Rejser, been a salesman for ten years for Naturgas Syd, been director of Esbjerg Elite (1994–96) and been employed by TDC and DanReklame.

Kjær still lives in Esbjerg and has coached Esbjerg fB's U14 goalkeepers.

== Honours ==
Esbjerg fB

- Danish Championship: 1979
- Danish Cup: 1976

Individual

- Danish Football Player of the Year: 1978
