= Palle Kähler =

Danish footballer

Personal information
- Date of birth: 16 November 1939
- Place of birth: Odense, Denmark
- Date of death: 10 June 2003 (aged 63)

International career
Years	Team	Apps	(Gls)
1964	Denmark	2	(0)

Palle Kähler (16 November 1939 – 10 June 2003) was a Danish footballer. He played in two matches for the Denmark national football team in 1964.
