= 1965 Danish 1st Division =

20th season of Danish 1st Division

Danish 1st Division
- Season: 1965

Statistics of Danish 1st Division in the 1965 season.

== Overview ==
It was contested by 12 teams, and Esbjerg fB won the championship.

== League standings ==
Pos	Team	Pld	W	D	L	GF	GA	GD	Pts
1	Esbjerg fB	22	12	7	3	53	24	+29	31
2	Vejle Boldklub	22	13	4	5	54	28	+26	30
3	Boldklubben 1903	22	11	6	5	47	26	+21	28
4	Boldklubben Frem	22	10	7	5	33	19	+14	27
5	Hvidovre IF	22	9	8	5	36	27	+9	26
6	Kjøbenhavns Boldklub	22	9	4	9	27	36	−9	22
7	Aalborg Boldspilklub	22	7	7	8	32	27	+5	21
8	Aarhus Gymnastikforening	22	7	7	8	37	45	−8	21
9	Boldklubben 1909	22	9	2	11	36	46	−10	20
10	Boldklubben 1913	22	7	5	10	31	38	−7	19
11	Boldklubben af 1893	22	4	3	15	21	56	−35	11
12	B 1901	22	2	4	16	24	59	−35	8

== Results ==
Home \ Away	AaB	AGF	B93	B01	B03	B09	B13	EFB	BKF	HIF	KBK	VBK
Aalborg BK	—	2–2	5–0	2–0	0–4	2–0	5–1	1–1	0–0	0–1	0–1	0–2
Aarhus GF	0–3	—	2–1	3–2	2–2	4–2	0–3	1–1	1–1	0–2	2–1	1–3
B.93	1–0	2–2	—	0–0	2–7	0–1	0–3	3–1	1–3	0–5	1–2	1–7
B 1901	0–6	4–0	2–0	—	0–2	2–3	1–3	2–3	0–3	2–4	2–2	0–5
B 1903	3–1	3–1	2–1	5–2	—	1–4	2–1	1–1	1–3	1–1	4–0	6–0
B 1909	1–3	5–2	0–3	3–1	2–1	—	1–0	0–4	1–3	0–2	1–3	3–1
B 1913	1–1	1–4	1–2	2–2	0–1	2–1	—	0–3	2–2	3–2	3–1	0–3
Esbjerg fB	6–0	3–3	2–1	4–1	3–0	3–4	1–0	—	1–2	3–2	7–0	1–1
BK Frem	0–0	1–2	3–0	3–0	0–0	1–1	1–1	1–2	—	1–0	0–2	2–0
Hvidovre IF	0–0	2–2	2–2	2–0	0–0	2–2	2–2	0–0	1–0	—	1–0	1–3
Kjøbenhavns BK	2–0	1–0	1–0	1–1	0–0	3–2	1–0	0–2	2–3	2–3	—	1–1
Vejle BK	1–1	0–3	5–0	3–0	2–1	5–0	3–4	1–1	1–0	4–1	3–1	—

Legend: Blue = home team win; Yellow = draw; Red = away team win.
