= 1962 Danish 1st Division =

17th season of Danish 1st Division

Danish 1st Division
- Season: 1962

Statistics of Danish 1st Division in the 1962 season.

== Overview ==
It was contested by 12 teams, and Esbjerg fB won the championship.

== League standings ==
Pos	Team	Pld	W	D	L	GF	GA	GD	Pts
1	Esbjerg fB	22	18	1	3	61	16	+45	37
2	Boldklubben 1913	22	13	3	6	52	37	+15	29
3	Aarhus Gymnastikforening	22	11	5	6	59	41	+18	27
4	Kjøbenhavns Boldklub	22	9	5	8	42	42	0	23
5	Vejle Boldklub	22	9	2	11	51	47	+4	20
6	Brønshøj BK	22	8	3	11	32	45	−13	19
7	Akademisk Boldklub	22	7	5	10	31	47	−16	19
8	Køge BK	22	6	6	10	36	42	−6	18
9	Boldklubben 1903	22	6	6	10	35	43	−8	18
10	Boldklubben 1909	22	5	8	9	30	41	−11	18
11	Odense Boldklub	22	6	6	10	31	44	−13	18
12	Frederikshavn fI	22	7	4	11	23	38	−15	18

== Results ==
Home \ Away	ABK	AGF	B03	B09	B13	BBK	EFB	FFI	KB	KBK	OB	VBK
Akademisk BK	—	0–2	2–1	1–4	3–3	2–0	0–4	0–0	2–3	0–3	2–1	0–1
Aarhus GF	3–3	—	1–2	6–2	1–1	3–1	0–4	2–0	5–1	2–0	6–2	1–4
B 1903	1–0	3–6	—	2–2	1–2	0–1	3–3	0–0	2–4	3–0	1–2	1–4
B 1909	0–3	0–1	0–1	—	2–4	0–0	1–0	1–1	2–2	2–2	3–3	0–4
B 1913	3–2	1–1	3–2	0–1	—	2–1	1–2	4–0	3–2	4–1	1–0	3–2
Brønshøj BK	1–3	1–4	0–3	1–1	4–3	—	0–3	1–2	4–3	3–0	4–3	1–3
Esbjerg fB	8–0	2–1	6–2	2–0	0–1	2–0	—	2–1	0–1	2–1	3–0	3–2
Frederikshavn fI	4–0	1–0	2–1	2–0	1–7	1–2	0–4	—	2–2	0–1	2–1	4–2
Kjøbenhavns BK	0–2	3–3	1–1	3–1	4–2	2–2	0–2	1–0	—	1–3	0–1	2–1
Køge BK	2–2	3–5	1–1	1–2	3–1	3–1	1–2	2–0	0–1	—	3–3	3–3
Odense BK	2–2	2–1	1–1	1–1	1–2	1–2	0–4	1–0	3–2	1–1	—	2–1
Vejle BK	1–2	5–5	2–3	1–5	3–1	1–2	1–3	4–0	1–4	3–2	2–0	—

Legend: Blue = home team win; Yellow = draw; Red = away team win.
