= Eigil Misser =

Danish footballer (1934–2021)

Personal information
- Date of birth: 22 April 1934
- Place of birth: Ringe, Denmark
- Date of death: 13 May 2021 (aged 87)
- Position: Forward

International career
Years	Team	Apps	(Gls)
1963	Denmark	2	(0)

Eigil Misser (22 April 1934 – 13 May 2021) was a Danish footballer. He played in two matches for the Denmark national football team in 1963.
