= Carl Emil Christiansen =

Danish footballer (1937–2018)

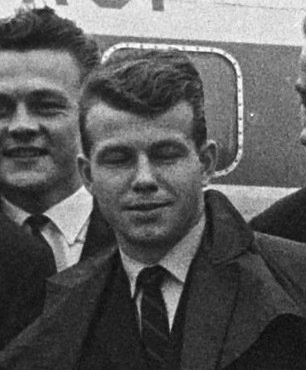

Personal information
- Full name: Carl Emil Christiansen
- Date of birth: 31 December 1937
- Place of birth: Esbjerg, Denmark
- Date of death: 15 January 2018 (aged 80)
- Place of death: Esbjerg, Denmark
- Position: Forward

Senior career*
Years	Team	Apps	(Gls)
1956–1967	Esbjerg fB		

International career
1962	Denmark	2	(1)

Managerial career
- 1972: Esbjerg fB
- 1979–1980: Esbjerg fB
- * Club domestic league appearances and goals

Carl Emil Christiansen (31 December 1937 – 15 January 2018) was a Danish association football player, who played 313 games and scored 112 goals for Esbjerg fB in Denmark. He was the top goalscorer of the 1962 Danish football championship, and played two games and scored one goal for the Denmark national football team.
