= Palle Hansen =

Danish footballer (born 1951)

Personal information
- Date of birth: 31 August 1951 (age 75)
- Place of birth: Ballerup, Denmark
- Height: 1.85 m (6 ft 1 in)
- Position: Right-back

Senior career*
Years	Team	Apps	(Gls)
1974–1975	Ballerup IF		
1976–1981	Kjøbenhavns Boldklub		
1982–1983	Hellerup IK		

International career
1979	Denmark U21	1	(0)
1979	Denmark	1	(0)
- * Club domestic league appearances and goals

Palle Hansen (born 31 August 1951) is a Danish former footballer who played as a right-back. He made one appearance for the Denmark national team in 1979.
