= John Madsen (footballer) =

Danish footballer (1937–2021)

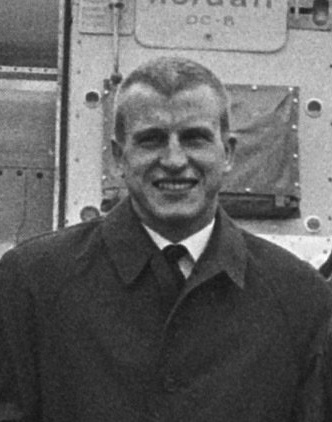

Personal information
- Date of birth: 14 May 1937
- Place of birth: Esbjerg, Denmark
- Date of death: 28 July 2021 (aged 84)
- Position: Centre back

Senior career*
Years	Team	Apps	(Gls)
- Esbjerg fB
1965–1966	Greenock Morton	44	(0)
1966–1969	Hibernian	71	(0)
- Esbjerg fB
Total		115+	(0+)

International career
	Denmark	20	(0)
- * Club domestic league appearances and goals

John Madsen (14 May 1937 – 28 July 2021) was a Danish footballer who played for Esbjerg fB, Greenock Morton, Hibernian, Newcastle United and Denmark.
