= Carl Bertelsen =

Danish footballer (1937–2019)

Personal information
- Full name: Carl Andreas Clausen Bertelsen
- Date of birth: 15 November 1937
- Place of birth: Haderslev, Denmark
- Date of death: 11 June 2019 (aged 81)
- Place of death: Odense, Denmark
- Position: Forward

Senior career*
Years	Team	Apps	(Gls)
–	Haderslev FK		
1962–1964	Esbjerg fB		
1964–1965	Greenock Morton	25	(10)
1965–1966	Dundee	15	(6)
1966–1967	Kilmarnock	25	(13)
–	OB		

International career
1962–1964	Denmark	20	(9)
- * Club domestic league appearances and goals

Carl Bertelsen (15 November 1937 – 11 June 2019) was a Danish footballer who played as a forward. He represented the Denmark national team, and was in the finals squad for the 1964 European Nations' Cup.

== Career ==
During his club career he played for Haderslev FK, Esbjerg fB, Morton, Dundee, Kilmarnock and OB. He earned 20 caps for the Denmark national team, and was in the finals squad for the 1964 European Nations' Cup.

== Personal life ==
In his late career, Bertelsen worked as a teacher. Bertelsen died of Alzheimer's disease in June 2019.
