= Preben Jensen (footballer) =

Danish footballer

Personal information
- Date of birth: 15 October 1939
- Date of death: 28 August 2013 (aged 73)

International career
Years	Team	Apps	(Gls)
1962	Denmark	2	(0)

Preben Jensen (15 October 1939 – 28 August 2013) was a Danish footballer. He played in two matches for the Denmark national football team in 1962.
