= Esbjerg fB =

Danish football club

- Full name: Esbjerg forenede Boldklubber
- Short name: EfB
- Founded: 23 July 1924; 102 years ago
- Ground: Blue Water Arena, Esbjerg
- Capacity: 17,442
- Chairman: Flemming Enevoldsen
- Head coach: Sancheev Manoharan
- League: Danish 1st Division
- 2025–26: Danish 1st Division, 4th of 12
- Website: efb.dk
Home colours	Away colours

Esbjerg forenede Boldklubber (Danish pronunciation: [ˈesˌpjɛɐ̯ˀ fʌˈe̝ˀnð̩ ˈpʌltkʰlupɐ]; commonly known as Esbjerg fB or EfB in short) is a Danish professional football club based in Esbjerg, West Jylland, that plays in the Danish 1st Division, the second tier of the Danish football league system. Founded in 1924 as a merger between Esbjerg Boldklub af 1898 and Esbjerg Amatørklub af 1911, the first team play their home games at Blue Water Arena which has been the club's home ground since its opening in 1955.

== History ==
=== Early years ===
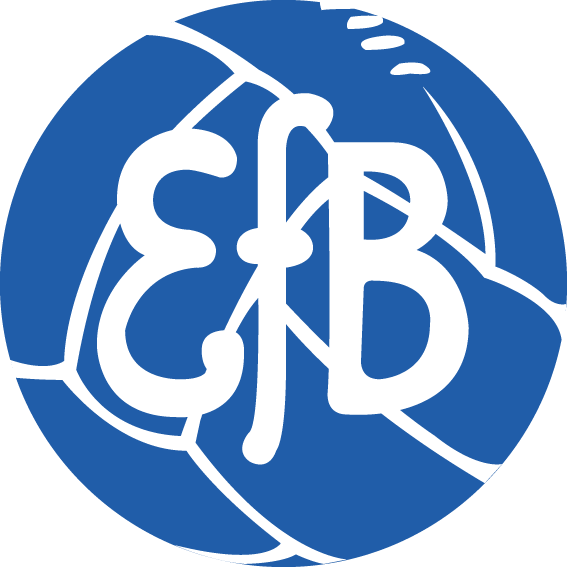
Original logo

Esbjerg forenede Boldklubber was officially established in 1924 as a merger between Esbjerg Boldklub af 1898 (E.B. 98) and Esbjerg Amatørklub af 1911 (EAK) after 12 years of competition between the two clubs. The new club was driven by ambition for something bigger, which already produced results the day after when the club's best start-up team defeated Kolding IF with 7–0.

=== Golden years (1960–1980) ===
The club's golden years were in the first half of the 1960s with the Austrian coach Rudi Strittich throughout most of the decade. The club won the Danish Championship in 1961, 1962, 1963 and 1965 and won the DBU Cup in 1964. This success has been largely attributed to Austrian coach Rudi Strittich, as well as strikers Jens Peter Hansen and Carl Emil Christiansen. In the championship season of 1961, Esbjerg set a stadium record with 20,000 spectators, as Esbjerg won the clash against KB 3–1 at home. In 1968, Esbjerg almost won another championship, when the team had the same amount of points as two other clubs before the last round, but despite winning the last match, KB won the title on goal difference. The following year, however, Esbjerg suffered relegation from the top tier, where they had played twenty consecutive seasons.

In 1974, Esbjerg fB won promotion to the top division again, marking the beginning of the club's second golden era. Esbjerg won the DBU Cup again in 1976. In 1977, Strittich returned as coach, and with goalkeeper Ole Kjær and midfielder Jens Jørn Bertelsen as the driving forces in the following years, Esbjerg were back at the top. The club won bronze medals in 1977, and in 1978 Esbjerg fB lost the cup final to Frem after a penalty shootout and a total of three finals, all of which ended 1–1. Later that year, they achieved a second-place finish in the top tier, while the team reached the third round of the UEFA Cup, where they beat Hertha BSC 2–1 in the first leg, but lost in the return match in Berlin by 4–0.

In 1979, Esbjerg fB won the club's fifth and most recent Danish championship. The following year, the team eliminated Halmstads BK in the European Champion Clubs' Cup. In the subsequent round, Esbjerg lost on the road with 3–0 to Spartak Moscow, but was in the return match, close to a sensation, Esbjerg won 2–0.

=== Ups and downs (1985–2012) ===
In 1985, Esbjerg was close to winning the cup tournament, but lost in the final 3–2 to Lyngby on a goal shortly before the final whistle. Esbjerg relegated from the top tier in 1986 and in the early 1990s were down in the third division. In 1999, Esbjerg returned to the Danish Superliga. This time, their tenure in the top division was more permanent, achieving a third-place finish in the 2003–04 season as their best performance, after being in first place with four rounds left. During that season, they broke records, causing Brøndby IF's largest home defeat ever, beating them 6–1 at Brøndby Stadium. In 2006 and 2008, the club reached the cup final. In the 2010–11 Danish Superliga season EfB finished 12th and were relegated to the Danish 1st Division for the first time since the 1999–2000 season.

Esbjerg returned to the Superliga in the 2012–13 season with success under head coach Jess Thorup, a former player for the club, as the team managed to win the Danish Cup for the third time in the club's history with a 1–0 victory against Randers FC, thus qualifying for European football. At the same time, they achieved a fourth place in the Superliga.

=== Frederiksen and European success (2013–19) ===
On 2 May 2013, the club announced that Niels Frederiksen would succeed Thorup as the club's head coach from the start of the 2013–14 Danish Superliga season. In the first season under Frederiksen, Esbjerg reached to the round of 32 in the Europa League, where they lost 4–2 over two legs to Italian side Fiorentina, despite winning 1–0 away at Stadio Artemio Franchi. This came after advancing from the group stage in second place by beating Standard Liège (2–1; 2–1) and Elfsborg (2–1; 1–0), and losing two matches to group winners, Red Bull Salzburg (2–1; 3–0). Esbjerg had qualified to the group stage after winning 5–3 on aggregate over French club Saint-Étienne. When the International Federation of Football History & Statistics (IFFHS) published their list of best clubs in the world, Esbjerg were in 79th place. Hans Henrik Andreasen was part of the autumn team in the Europa League among the best players in the tournament. In the domestic league, they also had a successful season, ending in fifth place which qualified the club for contention in the 2014–15 Europa League second round.

In the following season, Esbjerg knocked out Kazakh side Kairat Almaty 2–1 on aggregate in the second qualifying round, before facing Polish club Ruch Chorzów in the third round. In the first leg, Esbjerg drew 0–0 away. However, in the second leg, a last-minute goal by Łukasz Surma for Ruch Chorzów to make it 2–2 to win on away goals, ended Esbjerg's hopes of advancing in the tournament. In the domestic league, Esbjerg had sold key players such as Jakob Ankersen, Eddi Gomes and Martin Pušić during the winter transfer window, and partly due to this the club struggled against relegation. In the last fixture of the season, Esbjerg avoided relegation after a 2–1 win over relegation rivals, FC Vestsjælland.

On 10 August 2015, Frederiksen was dismissed by Esbjerg with the side placed last in the Danish Superliga table after four matches into the 2015–16 season, with chairman Søren Poulsen citing "lacking" domestic results as the reason behind the dismissal. Frederiksen was succeeded by Jonas Dal.

In 2017, Esbjerg moved out of the Superligaen after losing the decisive relegation final over two matches against AC Horsens by an aggregate score of 4–3. However, the club returned to the Superliga after just one season in the second tier. In the 2019–20 season, the club suffered another relegation after a tumultuous season.

=== American ownership, relegations, and controversies (2020–24) ===
From July 2020 to May 2021, Ólafur Kristjánsson was the head coach of the club. Earlier that season, in March 2021, Chien Lee of NewCity Capital, Randy Frankel of Partners Path Capital, Paul Conway of Pacific Media Group and Krishen Sud invested in Esbjerg fB and became the majority shareholder. Thereby, the club became part of the same ownership group as Barnsley, Oostende and Nancy. The club failed promotion to the Superliga in the 2020–21 season, finishing in third place, 14 points from promotion spots.

In May 2021, Peter Hyballa was hired as head coach of the club. Less than two months into his tenure, Danish newspaper B.T. reported that multiple Esbjerg players demanded his dismissal after "mental and physical punishments". The following day, Spillerforeningen, the Danish Player's Association, reprimanded the Esbjerg board after the American chairman Michael Kalt had toned down the conflict and informed JydskeVestkysten that only a few players were involved in the demand. One day later, Hyballa demoted four key players to the U19 team: Yuriy Yakovenko, Jakob Ankersen, Kevin Conboy and Zean Dalügge. On 15 July, Esbjerg fB were reported to the Danish Working Environment Authority (Danish: Arbejdstilsynet) by Spillerforeningen after reports came out that Hyballa had allegedly hit and "mentally terrorised" players. The following week, Hyballa stated that he had never hit anyone, and that he had only tried to motivate his players.

On 24 July, Hyballa appointed the 19-year-old Mads Larsen as the new team captain. Three days later, on 27 July, new accusations arose against Hyballa – this time from Kasper Pedersen – who had terminated his contract by mutual consent the day before. He stated that Hyballa had created a "horrible mood" and that he had left the club due to the manager.

On 28 July 2021 of Esbjerg's first-team players sent an open letter to club management, expressing "strong distrust" to Hyballa. The letter, which was also published in several media outlets, mentions several episodes where Hyballa had physically or mentally abused players. Responding to the letter, investor and spokesperson for the Esbjerg board, Paul Conway, stated to JydskeVestkysten that "[i]t's so unprofessional, I've never experienced anything like it. It can never be the players who get to decide who get to play and who is the coach."

On 11 August after weeks of stories in the press and a bad start to the season, Hyballa resigned as manager of Esbjerg and was replaced by Roland Vrabec. He was dismissed in March 2022 after seven months, as the club were mathematically out of reach of promotion. Rafael van der Vaart was appointed caretaker coach. On 18 March, in a 3–0 home loss to Lyngby, Esbjerg hooligans threw firecrackers onto the pitch and rioted after the game which resulted in multiple arrests, as the team were in a relegation battle. On 18 May 2022, Esbjerg suffered a devastating 3–2 defeat to Fremad Amager, relinquishing a 2–0 lead. This loss marked the first time in 28 years that Esbjerg was relegated to the Danish 2nd Division, the country's third tier.

In March 2024 Esbjerg was deducted three points in the 2nd Division by the Danish Football Union after a reorganisation of the club, which resulted in new local ownership.

=== Promotion and back in local hands (2024–present) ===
In May 2024, Esbjerg fB underwent a significant ownership and management transition. The Esbjerg Bankruptcy Court confirmed a reconstruction plan proposed by a local steering group, which was approved by all attending creditors. This decision ended the club's association with its former American owners, Esbjerg Investment Limited (EIL), spearheaded by Paul Conway, and returned Esbjerg fB to local control. Following the court's ruling, the club implemented immediate changes, including appointing a new board and a potential three-point deduction from the standings. The new board, led by local businessman Flemming Enevoldsen as chairman, also includes Søren Andersen, Kenneth Hagelskjær, and Søren Copsø. The steering group emphasised their primary goal was to preserve the club and prevent bankruptcy, rather than focusing solely on removing the previous American owners.

Despite the three-point deduction the club secured promotion back to the 1st Division with three matchdays left after a 2–0 away victory over Middelfart Boldklub on 24 May 2024. On 31 May, Esbjerg secured the league title after a decisive 6–0 home victory over Akademisk Boldklub.

== Stadium ==
Esbjerg fB plays at Blue Water Arena, which is the name of Esbjerg Stadion at Gl. Vardevej and part of Esbjerg Sports Park.

== Honours ==
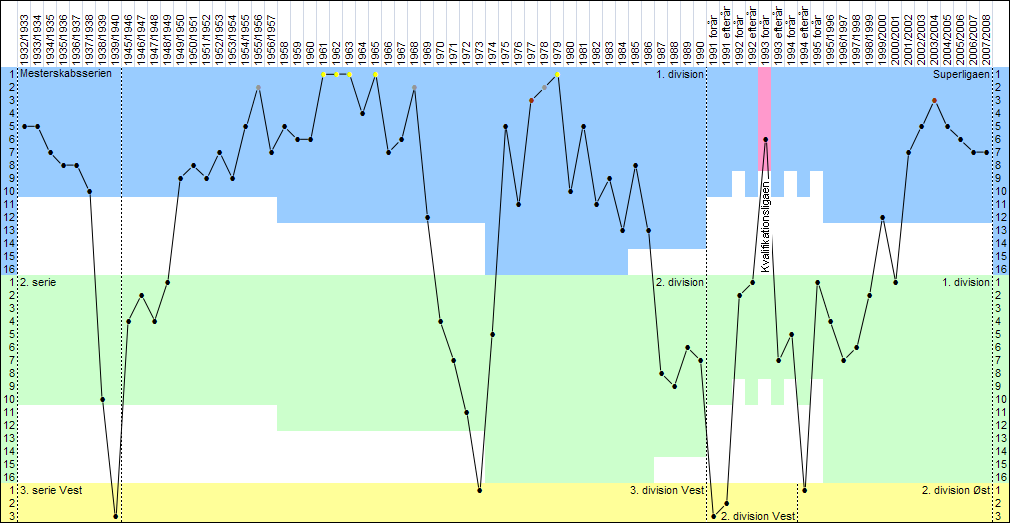
Esbjerg fB by season.

- Danish Superliga
  - Champions (5): 1961, 1962, 1963, 1965, 1979
  - Silver (3): 1955–56, 1968, 1978
  - Bronze (3): 1977, 2003–04, 2018–19
- Danish Cup
  - Winners (3): 1963–64, 1975–76, 2012–13
  - Runners-up (6): 1956–57, 1961–62, 1977–78, 1984–85, 2005–06, 2007–08
- Danish 1st Division
  - Champions: 2011–12
- Danish 2nd Division
  - Champions: 2023–24

== Achievements ==
- 45 seasons in the Highest Danish League
- 24 seasons in the Second Highest Danish League
- 5 seasons in the Third Highest Danish League

== Players ==
=== Current squad ===
As of 3 September 2026

Note: Flags indicate national team as defined under FIFA eligibility rules; some limited exceptions apply. Players may hold more than one non-FIFA nationality.

No.	Pos.	Nation	Player
1	GK	DEN	William Lykke (on loan from Nordsjælland)
2	DF	SWE	Frode Aronsson
3	DF	DEN	Anton Skipper
4	DF	DEN	Patrick Tjørnelund
5	DF	DEN	Jonathan Foss
6	MF	DEN	Lasse Vigen (captain)
7	MF	DEN	Nicklas Strunck
8	MF	NOR	Mikail Maden
9	FW	GHA	James Ampofo
10	MF	DEN	Oskar Boesen
11	FW	DEN	Peter Bjur
14	MF	NGR	John Kolawole
15	DF	DEN	Anders Sønderskov

No.	Pos.	Nation	Player
17	FW	DEN	Julius Lucena
18	MF	DEN	Marcus Hansen
19	DF	NOR	Sander Strand
22	MF	DEN	Benjamin Hvidt
24	MF	DEN	Gustav Grubbe
25	DF	DEN	Gustav Bjerge
32	DF	DEN	Nicolai Blicher
34	GK	DEN	Emil Jørgensen
39	FW	DEN	Noah Strandby
40	DF	DEN	Emil Larsen
80	FW	DEN	Muamer Brajanac
99	FW	PLE	Adam Ahmad

=== Out on loan ===
Note: Flags indicate national team as defined under FIFA eligibility rules; some limited exceptions apply. Players may hold more than one non-FIFA nationality.

No.	Pos.	Nation	Player
—	MF	ISL	Breki Baldursson (at Åsane until 31 December 2026)

== Staff ==
- Head Coach: Sancheev Manoharan
- Assistant Coach: Søren Pallesen
- A + Coach:
- Goalkeeper Coach: Frode Birkeland
- Transition Coach: Patrick Harboe
- Forward Coach: Jesper Lange
- Physical Coach: Morten Bastholm
- Assistant Physical Coach: Mattias Fredeløkke
- Kit Manager: René Christiansen

=== Former coaches ===
- (Austria) Rudi Strittich (1961–62)
- (Denmark) Arne Sørensen (1963–64)
- (Austria) Rudi Strittich (1965–67)
- (Denmark) Richard Møller Nielsen (1968–69)
- (Denmark) Ernst Netuka (1969–70)
- (Germany) Ludwig Weg (1970–71)
- (Denmark) Peter Stubbe (1972)
- (Denmark) JJ Hansen and (Denmark) CE Christiansen (1972)
- (Denmark) Egon Jensen (1973–76)
- (Austria) Rudi Strittich (1976–79)
- (Denmark) Carl Emil Christiansen (1979–80)
- (Germany) Jürgen Wähling (1981–83)
- (Denmark) Henrik Brandenborg (1984–86)
- (Denmark) Allan Michaelsen (1987–88)
- (Denmark) Allan Hebo Larsen (1989–90)
- (Norway) Jan Hansen (1990–93)
- (England) Ian Salter (1993)
- (Denmark) Jørn Bach (1993–97)
- (Denmark) Viggo Jensen (1997–02)
- (Denmark) Ove Pedersen (1 July 2002 – 31 December 2005)
- (Denmark) Troels Bech (1 July 2005 – 16 November 2008)
- (Denmark) Jess Thorup (17 November 2008 – 31 December 2008)
- (Denmark) Ove Pedersen (1 January 2009 – 14 March 2011)
- (Denmark) Jess Thorup (14 March 2011 – 30 May 2013)
- (Denmark) Niels Frederiksen (1 July 2013 – 10 August 2015)
- (Denmark) Michael Mex Pedersen (11 August 2015 – 20 October 2015)
- (Denmark) Jonas Dal (20 October 2015 – 30 June 2016)
- (England) Colin Todd (8 July 2016 – 5 December 2016)
- (Denmark) Lars Lungi Sørensen (5 December 2016 – 19 June 2017)
- (Netherlands) John Lammers (23 June 2017 – 16 September 2019)
- (Denmark) Claus Nørgaard (17 September 2019 – 27 October 2019)
- (Denmark) Lars Olsen (28 October 2019 – 9 June 2020)
- (Denmark) Troels Bech (10 June 2020 – 15 July 2020)
- (Iceland) Ólafur Kristjánsson (1 August 2020 – 10 May 2021)
- (Denmark) Lars Vind (10 May 2021 – 30 May 2021)
- (Germany) Peter Hyballa (1 June 2021 – 11 August 2021)
- (Germany) Roland Vrabec (11 August 2021 – 9 March 2022)
- (Netherlands) Rafael van der Vaart (10 March 2022 – 30 March 2022)
- (Denmark) Michael Kryger (30 March 2022 – 20 April 2022)
- (Denmark) Steffen Ernemann (20 April 2022 – 30 June 2022)
- (Denmark) Lars Vind (1 July 2022 – 22 March 2023)
- (Denmark) Lars Lungi Sørensen (22 March 2023 –15 June 2025)
- (Denmark) Sancheev Manoharan (16 June 2025 – Present)

== Denmark national football team players ==
The following 32 Esbjerg football players has been picked and had their debut on the Denmark national football team (debut/matches/goals):

- Peter Ankersen (2013/1/0)
- Martin Braithwaite (2013/2/1)
- Peter Nymann (2010/1/0)
- Søren Rieks (2009/3/1)
- Martin Vingaard (2008/5/1)
- Niki Zimling (2008/1/0)
- Jesper Bech (2006/1/0)
- Jan Kristiansen (2003/9/0)
- John Lauridsen (1981/27/3)
- Ole Madsen (1980/18/0)
- Ole Kjær (1977/26/0)
- Jens Jørn Bertelsen (1976/69/2)
- Hans Jørgen Christiansen (1968/5/0)
- Vagn Hedeager (1967/1/0)
- Børge Enemark (1965/11/0)
- Knud Petersen (1965/4/0)
- Preben Jensen (1962/2/0)
- Carl Emil Christiansen (1962/2/1)
- Jens Petersen (1962/22/1)
- Jens Jørgen Hansen (1962/40/0)
- Carl Bertelsen (1962/21/9)
- Erik Gaardhøje (1961/14/0)
- John Madsen (1961/20/0)
- Egon Jensen (1957/12/4)
- Ove Hansen (1956/9/0)
- Johannes Schmidt (1955/1/0)
- Søren Andersen (1951/5/0)
- Erik Terkelsen (1950/17/0)
- Jens Peder Hansen (1949/38/18)
- Curt Christensen (1949/1/0)
- Viggo Jensen (1945/15/1)
- Jørgen Iversen (1937/5/1)
- Olaf Brockhoff (1935/2/0)
- Arthur Nielsen (1935/1/0)
- Emil Møller (1932/3/0)

== Former notable foreign players ==
Esbjerg has a list of former notable foreign players of which some have represented their national team. Some of the most memorable are listed here:

- (Finland) Lukáš Hrádecký
- (France) Michaël Murcy
- (The Gambia) Njogu Demba-Nyrén
- (Germany) Kolja Afriyie
- (Greece) Kostas Tsimikas
- (Iceland) Kári Árnason
- (Iceland) Arnór Smárason
- (Latvia) Igors Stepanovs
- (Netherlands) Fernando Derveld
- (Netherlands) Tim Janssen
- (Netherlands) Rafael van der Vaart
- (Slovakia) Martin Dúbravka
- (Romania) Adrian Petre
- (Sweden) Fredrik Berglund
- (Sweden) Christian Karlsson
- (Sweden) Andreas Klarström
- (Sweden) Alexander Östlund
- (Sweden) Joakim Persson
- (Sweden) Erik Wahlstedt

== Player of the Year ==
Player of the year Esbjerg fB

- 1999–00: Henrik Ibsen
- 2000–01: Joakim Persson
- 2001–02: Christian Karlsson
- 2002–03: Jan Kristiansen
- 2003–04: Tommy Bechmann
- 2004–05: Fredrik Berglund
- 2005–06: Jerry Lucena
- 2006–07: Niki Zimling
- 2007–08: Martin Vingaard
- 2008–09: Søren Rieks
- 2009–10: Nicolai Høgh
- 2010–11: Jesper Lange
- 2011–12: Søren Rieks
- 2012–13: Lukáš Hrádecký
- 2013–14: Kian Hansen
- 2014–15: Jonas Knudsen
- 2015–16: Jeppe Højbjerg
- 2016–17: Victor Pálsson
- 2017–18: Anders Dreyer
- 2018–19: Joni Kauko
- 2019–20: Rodolph Austin
- 2020–21: Mads Kikkenborg
- 2021–22: Lasha Parunashvili
- 2022–23: Emil Holten

Player of the Year Denmark

- 1963: Jens Petersen
- 1978: Ole Kjær
- 1979: Jens Jørn Bertelsen

== Recent history ==
Season		Pos.	Pl.	W	D	L	GS	GA	P	Cup	Notes
1999–2000	SL	12	33	8	4	21	40	70	28	Quarter-final	relegated
2000–01	1D	1	30	19	8	3	79	29	65	5th round	promoted
2001–02	SL	7	33	13	6	14	42	44	45	Semi-final	
2002–03	SL	5	33	12	11	10	65	57	47	Quarter-final	
2003–04	SL	3	33	18	8	7	71	44	62	5th round	
2004–05	SL	5	33	13	10	10	61	47	49	5th round	
2005–06	SL	6	33	12	6	15	43	45	42	Runner-up	
2006–07	SL	7	33	10	10	13	46	51	40	4th round	
2007–08	SL	7	33	13	6	14	59	54	45	Runner-up	
2008–09	SL	9	33	7	11	15	32	41	32	3rd round	
2009–10	SL	4	33	13	11	9	48	43	50	4th round	
2010–11	SL	12	33	7	12	14	36	49	33	Semi-final	relegated
2011–12	1D	1	26	21	3	2	60	19	66	3rd round	promoted
2012–13	SL	4	33	13	8	12	38	32	47	Winner	
2013–14	SL	5	33	13	9	11	47	38	48	4th round	
2014–15	SL	8	33	10	10	13	47	45	40	Semi-final	
2015–16	SL	11	33	7	9	17	38	64	30	3rd round	
2016–17	SL	14	32	6	12	14	32	54	30	3rd round	relegated
2017–18	1D	2	33	18	6	9	61	36	60	1st round	promoted
2018–19	SL	3	36	16	8	12	45	47	56	Quarter-final	
2019–20	SL	14	32	5	7	20	32	58	22	Quarter-final	relegated
2020–21	1D	3	32	18	5	9	43	38	59	3rd round	
2021–22	1D	11	32	6	10	16	36	54	28	2nd round	relegated
2022–23	2D	4	32	19	5	8	59	36	62	1st round	
2023-24	2D	1	32	24	3	5	92	37	72	3rd round	promoted
2024-25	1D	6	32	13	2	17	52	56	41	4th round	
2025-26	1D										
