= Egon Jensen (footballer) =

Danish footballer (1937–2020)

Personal information
- Date of birth: 13 November 1937
- Place of birth: Gram, Denmark
- Date of death: 13 September 2020 (aged 82)
- Position: Midfielder

Senior career*
Years	Team	Apps	(Gls)
1955–1970	Esbjerg fB		

International career
1957–1966	Denmark	12	(4)

Managerial career
- 1973–1976: Esbjerg fB
- * Club domestic league appearances and goals

Egon Jensen (13 November 1937 – 13 September 2020) was a Danish footballer who played as a midfielder for Esbjerg fB. He made 12 appearances for the Denmark national team from 1957 to 1966.
