= Helge Jørgensen (footballer, born 1937) =

Danish footballer (born 1937)

Helge Jørgensen (born 17 September 1937) was a Danish footballer.

During his club career he played for Odense KFUM. He earned 6 caps for the Denmark national football team, and was in the finals squad for the 1964 European Nations' Cup.
