= 1963 Danish 1st Division =

18th season of Danish 1st Division

Danish 1st Division
- Season: 1963

Statistics of Danish 1st Division in the 1963 season.

== Overview ==
It was contested by 12 teams, and Esbjerg fB won the championship.

== League standings ==
Pos	Team	Pld	W	D	L	GF	GA	GD	Pts
1	Esbjerg fB	22	15	3	4	56	28	+28	33
2	Boldklubben 1913	22	11	3	8	48	44	+4	25
3	Boldklubben 1903	22	9	7	6	45	43	+2	25
4	Boldklubben 1909	22	9	5	8	57	48	+9	23
5	Aarhus Gymnastikforening	22	10	3	9	45	40	+5	23
6	Vejle Boldklub	22	9	5	8	39	43	−4	23
7	Kjøbenhavns Boldklub	22	9	4	9	49	49	0	22
8	B 1901	22	8	5	9	37	33	+4	21
9	Akademisk Boldklub	22	6	8	8	49	48	+1	20
10	Brønshøj BK	22	5	9	8	38	44	−6	19
11	Aalborg Boldspilklub	22	7	4	11	30	46	−16	18
12	Køge BK	22	3	6	13	33	60	−27	12

== Results ==
Home \ Away	ABK	AaB	AGF	B01	B03	B09	B13	BBK	EFB	KB	KBK	VBK
Akademisk BK	—	2–3	4–2	2–2	3–0	3–4	1–2	4–4	1–1	2–2	2–2	1–4
Aalborg BK	3–5	—	3–0	0–0	1–1	2–5	1–1	1–5	3–1	1–4	3–1	1–3
Aarhus GF	3–2	2–0	—	3–0	1–3	3–0	4–1	1–1	2–1	4–3	1–1	5–1
B 1901	1–1	1–0	1–2	—	2–2	4–3	1–2	6–2	1–0	2–0	1–1	6–0
B 1903	3–3	1–0	4–1	1–0	—	4–3	2–0	3–0	1–4	3–5	4–2	2–2
B 1909	2–2	1–2	3–2	3–2	4–1	—	2–2	2–2	1–2	5–2	7–3	1–2
B 1913	2–3	2–3	3–1	3–0	5–2	2–1	—	5–2	2–3	3–2	2–0	1–1
Brønshøj BK	1–3	0–1	1–0	0–1	2–2	0–0	4–2	—	2–2	1–1	2–2	2–3
Esbjerg fB	3–0	3–1	2–2	2–0	1–3	3–1	3–0	2–0	—	3–2	6–5	4–0
Kjøbenhavns BK	2–1	2–0	3–1	1–3	2–1	3–3	2–3	3–3	1–5	—	5–2	2–0
Køge BK	0–3	5–0	1–5	2–1	1–1	1–2	3–1	0–2	0–3	0–2	—	1–1
Vejle BK	2–1	1–1	2–0	3–2	1–1	1–4	3–4	0–2	0–2	3–0	6–0	—

Legend: Blue = home team win; Yellow = draw; Red = away team win.
