= Ikast FS =

Danish football club

- Full name: Ikast Forenede Sportsklubber
- Short name: IFS
- Founded: 6 December 1935; 90 years ago as Ikast FS
- Ground: EDC Arena – Ikast
- Capacity: 1,000
- Chairman: Michael Vestergaard Sørensen
- Manager: Mads Albæk
- League: Jutland Series 2
- 2025: Series 1, Group 8, 2nd of 8 (promoted via play-offs)
- Website: ikastfsfodbold.dk
Home colours

Ikast Forenede Sportsklubber, also known as Ikast FS or IFS, is a Danish football club based in Ikast, Central Denmark Region. The club competes in the regional leagues administered by DBU Jutland, part of the Danish football league system. The club was founded in 1935 and spent 13 seasons in the top tier of Danish football. Ikast FS were runners-up in the Danish championship in 1987 and reached the Danish Cup final three times.

Ikast FS has historically been closely linked to FC Midtjylland, which was formed in 1999 through a merger of the professional departments of Ikast FS and Herning Fremad. The club plays its home matches at Arena.

Between 2018 and the mid-2020s, the club's amateur football activities were organised in a joint superstructure known as Ikast FC, created together with Ikast KFUM. The team later reverted to competing under the Ikast FS name.

== History ==
=== Foundation and early development ===
Football was introduced in Ikast around 1910 and was initially played informally, mainly by younger residents. Organised football activity developed gradually, and one of the earliest known clubs in the town was Boldklubben af 1929.

Ikast Forenede Sportsklubber (Ikast FS) was founded on 6 December 1935 through the merger of Boldklubben af 1929, Ikast Tennisklub and Ikast Salonskytteforening. H. H. Christjansen became the club's first chairman, and representatives of the local citizens' association were included on the board. The club progressed rapidly through the regional league system in Jutland. In 1936, the first team won promotion from the B-division to the A-division, and the following year reached the Mellemrække (intermediate league). In 1939, Ikast FS were promoted to the Mesterrække, then the highest regional tier of competition. A new stadium was inaugurated in Ikast that same year, reflecting increasing local support for the club. In 1941, the team won the regional championship, one of its earliest recorded titles.

Throughout the 1940s and early 1950s, Ikast FS remained active in regional competition and regularly fielded youth and senior teams in organised league football. The club later entered the national league system. In 1955, Ikast FS reached the 3rd Division, then part of the nationwide league structure, and secured promotion to the 2nd Division two years later.

=== Top-flight era ===
Ikast FS achieved promotion to the Danish top division in 1978 and remained there for 13 seasons.

The club's greatest league success came in 1987, when it finished as runners-up in the Danish championship. A bronze medal followed in 1990.

Ikast FS also reached the Danish Cup final in 1986, 1989 and 1997, finishing runners-up on all three occasions.

==== European competitions ====
The club appeared in European competitions three times: the UEFA Cup in 1988 and 1991, and the UEFA Cup Winners' Cup in 1989. Ikast FS were eliminated in the early rounds each time.

=== Midtjylland formation ===
In 1999, the professional football departments of Ikast FS and Herning Fremad merged to form FC Midtjylland. Ikast FS continued as an amateur club.

=== Ikast FC superstructure and reversion to Ikast FS ===
Ikast FC's logo between 2018 and 2025

In 2018, the amateur football departments of Ikast FS and Ikast KFUM formed a joint superstructure known as Ikast FC. The team competed under this name in the regional Danish leagues.

At a general meeting held on 25 February 2025, members approved a proposal from the board to change the club's name from Ikast FC back to Ikast FS. The decision marked the end of the Ikast FC superstructure era, and the club subsequently resumed competition under its historic name.

In January 2026, former professional footballer Mads Albæk was appointed head coach of Ikast FS.

== Honours ==
- Danish Cup:
  - Runners-up (3): 1985–86, 1988–89, 1996–97

== Achievements ==
- 17 seasons in the Highest Danish League
- 21 seasons in the Second Highest Danish League
- 8 seasons in the Third Highest Danish League
