= Frederik Markmann =

Danish football executive (1848–1927)

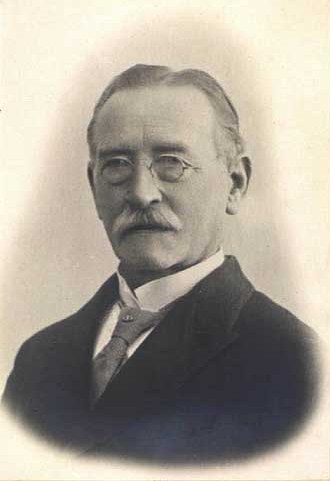
- Frederik Markmann

1st President of Danish Football Association
- In office 18 May 1889 – 1890
- Succeeded by: Harald Hilarius-Kalkau
- Born: Frederik Joachim August Markmann; 13 October 1848; Copenhagen, Denmark
- Died: 15 July 1927 (aged 78); Vejle, Denmark
- Resting place: Assistens Cemetery
- Citizenship: Danish
- Occupation: Football executive
- Known for: 1st President of Danish Football Association

Frederik Joachim August Markmann (13 October 1848 – 15 July 1927) was a Danish football executive, who was the first chairman of the Danish Football Association from May 1889 to 1890.

== Official career ==
Born in 1848 as the son of a master baker, he became a student at the von Westenske Institute in 1866, studied law, and took his master's degree (Jurist) in 1872. In the following year he was employed as an assistant in the Overformynderiet's bookkeeping, then in the Ministry of Finance. He became a clerk in the Domain Office in 1889, a county administrator for Holstebro Amtstuedistrikt in 1892, appointed county administrator for Vejle Amtstuedistrikt in 1913 and forest treasurer for Randbøl District at the same time. He was dismissed from the state service on 25 September 1921 and was simultaneously appointed Dannebrogsman. Markmann was also a municipal auditor in Holstebro and a member of the board of the Vejle-Vandel Railway. He set up and managed an experimental fish hatchery in Holstebro.

== Sportsman ==
On 26 April 1876 on the grassy fields just outside Copenhagen which later became Fælledparken, Markmann co-founded Kjøbenhavns Boldklub (KB), one of the first sports club in the country. Football was added to the club's programme on 24 October 1878, making it the oldest football club in the world outside of the United Kingdom and the oldest football club on continental Europe. Markmann was the chairman of KB between 1880 and 1883, carrying out a great deal of work over the three years and was appointed an honorary member upon his resignation.

In 1886, Markmann, together with E. Wescher, Ludvig Sylow, and Holger Forchhammer, translated the English association rules into Danish, so from then on rules such as offside and "hand on the ball" were used in Danish football. These rules were first used in a match the following year, in 1887. Prior to this, the matches would be played with a mixture of rugby and football rules, so this translation was a big step in the development of football in Denmark.

When 26 associations founded the Danish Football Association on 18 May 1889, Frederik Markmann became the union's first chairman, despite not playing football on a daily basis, in fact, he was not even a football man, but rather a former cricket and tennis player at KB, of which he was also a co-founder and chairman. This is due to the fact that at the beginning, the primary driving force behind DBU was not football, but cricket. However, Markmann believed that football could also be included in DBU, because the two sports were complementary to each other. Although football still had a tarnished reputation, Markmann believed that it was ideal for winter training for the cricketers and therefore had every right to be part of the association. It was under his presidency, that DBU organized the first edition of Fodboldturneringen (English: The Football Tournament), which was held between 1889 and 1903, with KB winning on four occasions, including back-to-back titles in 1896–97 and 1897–98. The Fodboldturneringen was the forerunner for the Danish National Football Tournament, which was held for the first time in 1912–13, ending with a KB triumph, thus becoming the first Danish champions. Despite some encouraging first steps, he was replaced as chairman in the following year, by clubmate Harald Hilarius-Kalkau.

== Later life ==
Markmann married Thomasine Kirstine Frøsig (1870 - 1950) on 4 April 1926 in St. Nicolai Church in Vejle. However, Markmann died the following year on 15 July 1927, at the age of 78.
