= 1894 in association football =

The following are the association football events of the year 1894 throughout the world.

== Events ==
=== Austria ===
- First Vienna FC

=== Belgium ===
- K.F.C. Rhodienne-Verrewinkel
- Sporting Club de Bruxelles

=== England ===
- Hastings United F.C.
- Marine F.C.
- Redhill F.C.
- Manchester City Football Club
- Bristol City F.C.

=== Germany ===
- Karlsruher SC

=== Netherlands ===
- BV Veendam

=== Scotland ===
- Dumbarton Harp F.C.

=== Sweden ===
- GAIS

=== Switzerland ===
- FC La Chaux-de-Fonds

== National League Champions ==
=== South America ===
Nation	Tournament	Winner	Runner-up	Title	Previous title won
Argentina	Primera Division	Lomas	Rosario	2nd	1893

=== Europe ===
Nation	Tournament	Winner	Runner-up	Title	Previous title won
Denmark	Football Tournament	Akademisk Boldklub	Kjøbenhavns Boldklub	3rd	1893
England	First Division	Aston Villa	Sunderland	1st	None
Ireland	Football League	Glentoran	Linfield	1st	None
Netherlands	Football League	RAP	Koninkiljke	2nd	1892
Scotland	First Division	Celtic	Heart of Midlothian	2nd	1893

== Domestic Cups ==
=== Asia ===
Nation	Tournament	Winner	Score	Runner-up	Venue	Title	Previous title won
India	Durand Cup	Highland Light Infantry	1-0	Royal Scots Fusiliers	Annadale	4th	1893

=== Europe ===
Nation	Tournament	Winner	Score	Runner-up	Venue	Title	Previous title won
England	FA Cup	Notts County	4-1	Bolton Wanderers	Goodison Park	1st	None
France	French Championship	Standard	2-0 (replay following 2-2 draw)	The White Rovers	Racing Club's ground	1st	None
Ireland	Irish Cup	Distillery	3-2 (replay after 2-2 draw)	Linfield	Solitude	5th	1889
Scotland	Scottish Cup	Rangers	3-1	Celtic	Cathkin Park	1st	None
Wales	Welsh Cup	Chirk	2-0	Westminster Rovers	Wynnstay Park	5th	1892

== International tournaments ==
- 1894 British Home Championship (February 24 – April 7, 1894)

Scotland

== Births ==
- January 15 – Henk Steeman, Dutch international footballer (d. 1979)
- August 14 – Jack Butler, English international footballer and manager (d. 1961)
- December 3 – Thomas Bell, English professional footballer (d. 1951)
- December 24 – Evert Jan Bulder, Dutch international footballer (d. 1973)
- Full date unknown
  - Joseph Hodgson, English professional footballer (d. 1913)
