= 1895 in association football =

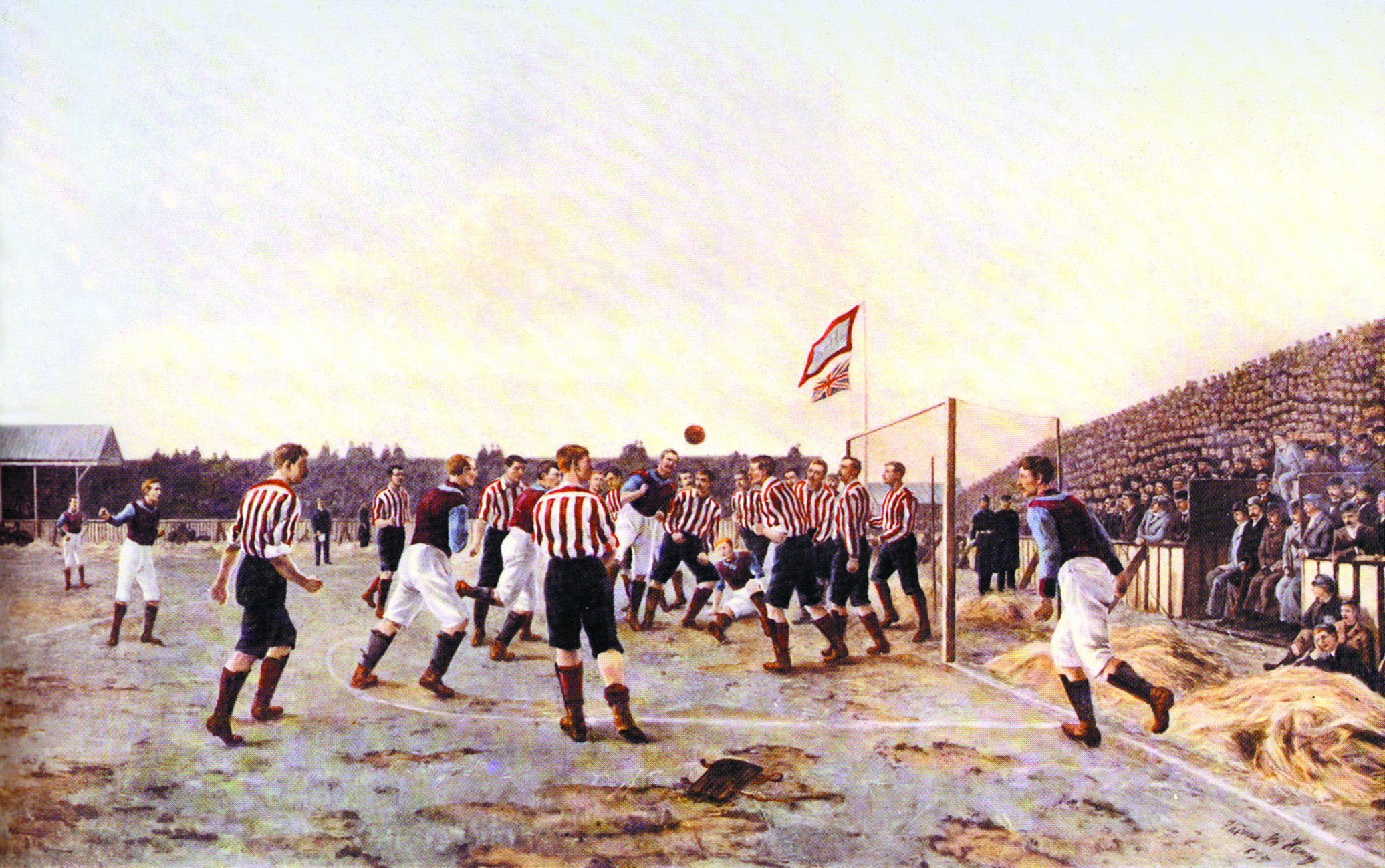
One of the earliest English football paintings: Sunderland v. Aston Villa 1895 by Thomas M. M. Hemy

The following are association football events in the year 1895 throughout the world.

== Events ==
=== Clubs founded in 1895 ===
- Camberley Town F.C.
- CR Flamengo
- Dundela F.C.
- Eintracht Braunschweig
- FC St. Georg Hamburg
- Fortuna Düsseldorf
- Pine Villa F.C. (Oldham Athletic A.F.C.)
- R. Daring Club Molenbeek
- Shelbourne F.C.
- Thames Ironworks (West Ham United)
- Yeovil Town F.C.

== National League Champions ==
=== South America ===
Nation	Tournament	Winner	Runner-up	Title	Previous title won
Argentina	Primera Division	Lomas	Lomas Academy	3rd	1894

=== Europe ===
Nation	Tournament	Winner	Runner-up	Title	Previous title won
Denmark	Football Tournament	Akademisk	Kjøbenhavns Boldklub	4th	1894
England	First Division	Sunderland	Everton	3rd	1893
Ireland	Football League	Linfield	Distillery	4th	1893
Netherlands	Football League	Koninkiljke	Sparta Rotterdam	3rd	1893
Scotland	First Division	Heart of Midlothian	Celtic	1st	None

== Domestic Cups ==
=== Asia ===
Nation	Tournament	Winner	Score	Runner-up	Venue	Title	Previous title won
India	Durand Cup	Highland Light Infantry	1-0	Somerset Light Infantry	Annadale	5th	1894

=== Europe ===
Nation	Tournament	Winner	Score	Runner-up	Venue	Title	Previous title won
England	FA Cup	Aston Villa	1-0	West Bromwich Albion	Crystal Palace	2nd	1887
France	French Championship	Standard	3-1	The White Rovers	Bordeaux	2nd	1894
Ireland	Irish Cup	Linfield	10-1	Bohemians	Solitude	4th	1893
Scotland	Scottish Cup	St. Bernard's	2-1	Renton	Ibrox Park	1st	None
Wales	Welsh Cup	Newtown	3-2	Wrexham	Recreation Field	2nd	1879

== International tournaments ==
- 1895 British Home Championship (March 9 – April 6, 1895)

England

== Births ==
- 11 February – Maurice Cottenet, French footballer
- 11 April – Jack Bamber, British footballer
- 23 May – Paul Baron, French footballer
- 31 August – Ben Verweij, Dutch footballer (d. 1951)
- 10 September – Jean Batmale, French international footballer (died 1973)
- 13 November – Jan de Natris, Dutch footballer (d. 1972)
- 7 Dezember – Karl Flink; German international footballer (d. 1958)
- Antonio Bruna, Italian footballer
- Édouard Baumann, French footballer
- Félix Romano, Italian footballer, naturalized French citizen
