= 1958–59 Chelsea F.C. season =

English football club season

Chelsea
1958–59 season
- Chairman: Joe Mears
- Manager: Ted Drake
- Stadium: Stamford Bridge
- First Division: 14th
- FA Cup: Fourth round
- Inter-Cities Fairs Cup: Quarter-finals
- Top goalscorer: League: Jimmy Greaves (32); All: Jimmy Greaves (37)
- Highest home attendance: 62,118 vs Wolves (30 August 1958)
- Lowest home attendance: 13,104 vs Copenhagen XI (4 November 1958)
- Average home league attendance: 40,794
- Biggest win: 6–2 v Wolves (30 August 1958)
- Biggest defeat: 0–6 v Bolton Wanderers (4 March 1959)
Home colours	Away colours

The 1958–59 season was Chelsea Football Club's 45th competitive season. The club played in the European competition for the first time, and reached the quarter-finals of the Inter-Cities Fairs Cup, where they lost on aggregate to a Belgrade XI. With 32 league goals, Jimmy Greaves was the First Division's top goalscorer, becoming the first Chelsea played to achieve this.

== Table ==
Pos	Team	Pld	W	D	L	GF	GA	GAv	Pts
12	Preston North End	42	17	7	18	70	77	0.909	41
13	Nottingham Forest	42	17	6	19	71	74	0.959	40
14	Chelsea	42	18	4	20	77	98	0.786	40
15	Leeds United	42	15	9	18	57	74	0.770	39
16	Everton	42	17	4	21	71	87	0.816	38

Source: World Football
Rules for classification: 1) Points; 2) Goal average; 3) Goals scored

== Inter-Cities Fairs Cup ==
Win Draw Loss

=== First round ===
30 September 1958 First leg	Copenhagen XI (Denmark)	1–3	(England) Chelsea	Copenhagen, Denmark
	Gronemann 25'	Report	Harrison 13'; Greaves 54'; Nicholas 90'	Stadium: Idrætsparken; Attendance: 19,200

4 November 1958 Second leg	Chelsea (England)	4–1	(Denmark) Copenhagen XI	London, England
	Lees 6' (o.g.); Greaves 44', 70'; Sillett 72'	Report	Schøne 7'	Stadium: Stamford Bridge; Attendance: 13,104

=== Quarter-finals ===
29 April 1959 First leg	Chelsea (England)	1–0	(Socialist Federal Republic of Yugoslavia) Belgrade XI	London, England
	Brabrook 30'	Report		Stadium: Stamford Bridge; Attendance: 25,771

13 May 1959 First leg	Belgrade XI (Socialist Federal Republic of Yugoslavia)	4–1	(England) Chelsea	Belgrade, Yugoslavia
	Petaković 3'; Mihajlović 42', 86'; Kostić 65'	Report	Brabrook 51'	Stadium: Omladinski Stadium; Attendance: 10,000
