= 1896 in association football =

The following are the association football events of the year 1896 throughout the world.

== Events ==
- March 16 - England defeat Wales 9–1 at Cardiff

=== Clubs founded in 1896 ===
- Basingstoke Town F.C.
- Bracknell Town F.C.
- CS Constantine
- Ciclista Lima
- Club Atlético Banfield
- Crawley Town F.C.
- Hannover 96
- FC Heilbronn
- FC Schaffhausen (June)
- FC Winterthur
- FC Zürich (August)
- Horwich RMI F.C.
- Olympia Leipzig
- Skill F.C. de Bruxelles
- Udinese Calcio
- Viborg FF
- Willem II Tilburg

=== Clubs dissolved in 1896 ===
- Royal Ordnance Factories

== National League Champions ==
=== South America ===
| Nation | Tournament | Winner | Runner-up | Title | Previous title won |
|---|---|---|---|---|---|
| Argentina | Primera Division | Lomas Academy | Flores | 1st | None |

=== Europe ===
| Nation | Tournament | Winner | Runner-up | Title | Previous title won |
|---|---|---|---|---|---|
| Belgium | First Division | FC Liégeois | Antwerp | 1st | None |
| Denmark | Football Tournament | Akademisk | Kjøbenhavns Boldklub | 5th | 1895 |
| England | First Division | Aston Villa | Derby County | 2nd | 1894 |
| France | French Championship | Club Français | The White Rovers | 1st | None |
| Ireland | Football League | Distillery | Cliftonville | 1st | None |
| Netherlands | Football League | HVV Den Haag | RAP | 2nd | 1891 |
| Scotland | First Division | Celtic | Rangers | 3rd | 1894 |

== Domestic Cups ==
=== Asia ===
| Nation | Tournament | Winner | Score | Runner-up | Venue | Title |
|---|---|---|---|---|---|---|
| India | Durand Cup | Somerset Light Infantry | 6-1 | Black Watch | Annadale | 1st |

=== Europe ===
| Nation | Tournament | Winner | Score | Runner-up | Venue | Title | Previous title won |
|---|---|---|---|---|---|---|---|
| England | FA Cup | The Wednesday | 2-1 | Wolverhampton | Crystal Palace | 1st | None |
| Ireland | Irish Cup | Distillery | 3-1 | Glentoran | Solitude | 6th | 1894 |
| Scotland | Scottish Cup | Heart of Midlothian | 3-1 | Hibernian | New Logie Green | 2nd | 1891 |
| Wales | Welsh Cup | Bangor | 3-1 | Wrexham | Council Field | 2nd | 1889 |
| Sweden | Svenska Mästerskapet | Örgryte IS | 3-0 | IS Idrottens Vänner | Skånska Husarregementets fotbollsplan | 1st | None |

== International tournaments ==
- 1896 British Home Championship (February 29 – April 4, 1896)

Scotland

== Births ==
- January 18 – Angelo Luzzani, Italian footballer (d. 1960)
- April 16 – Árpád Weisz, Hungarian footballer (d. 1944)
- August 28 – Harry Dénis, Dutch footballer (d. 1971)
- September 27 – Jaap Bulder, Dutch footballer (d. 1979)
- November 22 – George Reader, English football referee (d. 1978)

== Deaths ==
- November 29 - Joe Powell, 26, Woolwich Arsenal captain, due to injuries sustained in a match.
