= 1898–99 Football Tournament =

Tournament details
- Country: Denmark
- Teams: 6

Final positions
- Champions: Akademisk Boldklub (6th title)
- Runner-up: Boldklubben af 1893

Tournament statistics
- Matches played: 29
- Goals scored: 114 (3.93 per match)
- Top goal scorer(s): Johannes Gandil (11 goals)

The 1898–99 Football Tournament was the 10th staging of The Football Tournament.

In case of a tie, extra-time would be played, and if the match was still level after it, the match would be replayed until a winner emerged.

== Overview ==
It was contested by 6 teams, and Akademisk Boldklub won the championship for the sixth time in their history.

== League standings ==
Pos	Team	Pld	W	L	GF	GA	GR	Pts
1	Akademisk Boldklub	10	9	1	30	9	3.333	18
2	Boldklubben af 1893	10	6	4	25	14	1.786	12
2	Boldklubben Frem	10	6	4	23	13	1.769	12
2	Kjøbenhavns Boldklub	10	6	4	21	12	1.750	12
5	Østerbros BK	10	3	7	11	21	0.524	6
6	Boldklubben Dana	10	0	10	4	45	0.089	0

Source: 1898–99 results
