= 1899–1900 Football Tournament =

Football Tournament
- Season: 1899–1900

Statistics of the Football Tournament in the 1899/1900 season.

== Overview ==
It was contested by 5 teams, and Boldklubben af 1893 won the championship.

== League standings ==
Pos	Team	Pld	W	D	L	GF	GA	GR	Pts
1	Boldklubben af 1893	8	5	0	3	17	6	2.833	10
1	Akademisk Boldklub	8	5	0	3	21	11	1.909	10
3	Kjøbenhavns Boldklub	8	3	2	3	17	18	0.944	8
3	Boldklubben Frem	8	3	2	3	15	18	0.833	8
5	Østerbros BK	8	2	0	6	3	20	0.150	4
