= 1891–92 Football Tournament =

Tournament details
- Country: France
- Teams: 5

Final positions
- Champions: Akademisk Boldklub (4th title)
- Runner-up: Østerbros Boldklub

Tournament statistics
- Matches played: 8
- Goals scored: 38 (4.75 per match)
- Top goal scorer(s): Karl Gadegaard (7 goals)

The 1891–92 Football Tournament was the 3rd staging of The Football Tournament.

The format was slightly unusual in that all games had to have a winner. Therefore, if the match was level after 90 minutes, extra time was played. If the match was still level after extra time, the match was replayed until a winner emerged. Ironically, no winner emerged in the end, as three teams finished level at 6 points with three wins each, and therefore no winner of the tournament was declared.

== League standings ==
Pos	Team	Pld	W	L	GF	GA	GR	Pts
1	Akademisk Boldklub	4	3	1	14	7	2.000	6
1	Østerbro Boldklub	4	3	1	8	6	1.333	6
1	Kjøbenhavns Boldklub	4	3	1	5	5	1.000	6
4	Boldklubben Frem	4	1	3	9	8	1.125	2
5	Melchioraner Boldklubben	4	0	4	2	12	0.167	0

Source: 1891–92 results
