= 1895–96 Football League =

8th season of the Football League

The Football League
- Season: 1895–96
- Champions: Aston Villa
- Relegated: Crewe Alexandra; Burslem Port Vale; Rotherham Town
- New Club in League: Loughborough

The 1895–96 season was the eighth season of The Football League.

== Final league tables ==
Beginning in the 1894–95 season, clubs finishing level on points were separated according to goal average (goals scored divided by goals conceded). In case one or more teams had the same goal difference, this system favoured those teams who had scored fewer goals. The goal average system was eventually scrapped beginning with the 1976–77 season.

During the first six seasons of the league, (up to the 1893–94 season), re-election process concerned the clubs which finished in the bottom four of the league. From the 1894–95 season and until the 1920–21 season the re-election process was required of the clubs which finished in the bottom three of the league.

== First Division ==
First Division
- Season: 1895–96
- Champions: Aston Villa; 2nd title
- Relegated: Small Heath
- Matches: 240
- Goals: 807 (3.36 per match)
- Top goalscorer: John Campbell; Steve Bloomer (22 goals each)
- Biggest home win: Derby County 8–0 Small Heath (30 November 1895); Sheffield United 8–0 Bury (6 April 1896)
- Biggest away win: The Wednesday 0–4 Derby County (28 December 1895)
- Highest scoring: Aston Villa 7–3 Small Heath (7 September 1895)
- Longest winning run: 9 matches Everton
- Longest unbeaten run: 14 matches Everton
- Longest losing run: 6 matches Burnley; Small Heath
- Highest attendance: 30,000; Everton 2–0 Aston Villa (21 December 1895)
- Lowest attendance: 560; West Bromwich Albion 3–2 Blackburn Rovers (29 April 1896)
- Average attendance: 7,682

Pos	Team	Pld	W	D	L	GF	GA	GAv	Pts	Relegation
1	Aston Villa (C)	30	20	5	5	78	45	1.733	45	
2	Derby County	30	17	7	6	68	35	1.943	41	
3	Everton	30	16	7	7	66	43	1.535	39	
4	Bolton Wanderers	30	16	5	9	49	37	1.324	37	
5	Sunderland	30	15	7	8	52	41	1.268	37	
6	Stoke	30	15	0	15	56	47	1.191	30	
7	The Wednesday	30	12	5	13	44	53	0.830	29	
8	Blackburn Rovers	30	12	5	13	40	50	0.800	29	
9	Preston North End	30	11	6	13	44	48	0.917	28	
10	Burnley	30	10	7	13	48	44	1.091	27	
11	Bury	30	12	3	15	50	54	0.926	27	
12	Sheffield United	30	10	6	14	40	50	0.800	26	
13	Nottingham Forest	30	11	3	16	42	57	0.737	25	
14	Wolverhampton Wanderers	30	10	1	19	61	65	0.938	21	
15	Small Heath (R)	30	8	4	18	39	79	0.494	20	Qualification for test matches
16	West Bromwich Albion (O)	30	6	7	17	30	59	0.508	19	Qualification for test matches

Source: World Football
Rules for classification: 1) Points; 2) Goal average; 3) Goals scored
(C) Champions; (O) Play-off winners; (R) Relegated

=== Results ===
Home \ Away	AST	BLB	BOL	BUR	BRY	DER	EVE	NOT	PNE	SHU	SMH	STK	SUN	WED	WBA	WOL
Aston Villa		3–1	2–0	5–1	2–0	4–1	4–3	3–1	1–0	2–2	7–3	5–2	2–1	2–1	1–0	4–1
Blackburn Rovers	1–1		3–2	1–0	0–2	0–2	2–3	2–0	3–0	1–0	2–1	3–1	2–4	2–1	1–0	3–1
Bolton Wanderers	2–2	1–1		1–0	2–4	2–1	3–1	2–1	1–0	4–1	4–1	3–1	1–0	2–0	2–1	4–0
Burnley	3–4	6–0	1–2		3–0	2–2	1–1	0–0	1–0	5–0	1–1	2–0	0–0	2–0	3–0	3–1
Bury	5–3	2–0	0–3	3–4		1–2	1–1	1–0	1–2	1–0	4–5	0–1	1–2	6–1	3–0	3–0
Derby County	2–2	0–0	2–1	5–1	2–1		2–1	4–0	1–0	0–2	8–0	2–1	2–0	3–1	4–1	5–2
Everton	2–0	0–2	1–1	2–1	3–2	2–2		6–2	3–2	5–0	3–0	7–2	1–0	2–2	1–1	2–0
Nottingham Forest	0–2	4–2	0–0	2–1	5–0	2–5	2–1		0–1	3–1	3–0	4–0	3–1	1–0	2–0	3–2
Preston North End	4–3	1–1	1–0	1–1	1–1	1–0	1–1	6–0		4–3	3–2	0–1	4–1	0–1	0–0	4–3
Sheffield United	2–1	1–1	1–0	1–1	8–0	1–1	1–2	2–1	2–1		2–0	1–0	1–2	1–1	2–0	2–1
Small Heath	1–4	2–1	1–2	1–0	1–0	1–3	0–3	1–0	5–2	2–1		1–2	0–1	1–1	2–2	3–2
Stoke	1–2	3–0	2–0	2–1	0–2	2–1	1–2	1–0	4–0	4–0	6–1		5–0	5–0	3–1	4–1
Sunderland	2–1	2–1	1–0	3–1	0–0	2–2	3–0	1–1	4–1	1–1	2–1	4–1		2–1	7–1	2–2
The Wednesday	1–3	3–0	1–1	1–0	1–3	0–4	3–1	3–0	1–1	1–0	3–0	2–1	3–0		5–3	3–1
West Bromwich Albion	1–1	3–2	2–3	0–2	1–3	0–0	0–3	3–1	1–2	1–0	0–0	1–0	1–1	2–3		2–1
Wolverhampton Wanderers	1–2	1–2	5–0	5–1	1–0	2–0	2–3	6–1	2–1	4–1	7–2	1–0	1–3	4–0	1–2	

Legend: Blue = home team win; Yellow = draw; Red = away team win.

=== Maps ===
Locations of the Football League First Division teams

== Second Division ==
Second Division
- Season: 1895–96
- Champions: Liverpool
- Promoted: Liverpool
- Matches: 240
- Goals: 943 (3.93 per match)
- Top goalscorer: George Allan (26 goals)
- Biggest home win: Liverpool 10–1 Rotherham Town (18 February 1896)
- Biggest away win: Burton Swifts 0–7 Liverpool (29 February 1896); Crewe Alexandra 0–7 Liverpool (28 March 1896)
- Highest scoring: Darwen 10–2 Rotherham Town (13 January 1896)
- Longest winning run: 10 matches Liverpool
- Longest unbeaten run: 10 matches Burton Wanderers; Liverpool
- Longest losing run: 6 matches Lincoln City

Pos	Team	Pld	W	D	L	GF	GA	GAv	Pts	Qualification or relegation
1	Liverpool (C, O, P)	30	22	2	6	106	32	3.313	46	Qualification for test matches
2	Manchester City	30	21	4	5	63	38	1.658	46	Qualification for test matches
3	Grimsby Town	30	20	2	8	82	38	2.158	42	
4	Burton Wanderers	30	19	4	7	69	40	1.725	42	
5	Newcastle United	30	16	2	12	73	50	1.460	34	
6	Newton Heath	30	15	3	12	66	57	1.158	33	
7	Woolwich Arsenal	30	14	4	12	58	42	1.381	32	
8	Leicester Fosse	30	14	4	12	57	44	1.295	32	
9	Darwen	30	12	6	12	72	67	1.075	30	
10	Notts County	30	12	2	16	57	54	1.056	26	
11	Burton Swifts	30	10	4	16	39	69	0.565	24	
12	Loughborough	30	9	5	16	40	66	0.606	23	
13	Lincoln City	30	9	4	17	53	75	0.707	22	
14	Burslem Port Vale (R)	30	7	4	19	43	78	0.551	18	Resigned from league
15	Rotherham Town	30	7	3	20	34	97	0.351	17	Resigned from league and folded
16	Crewe Alexandra (R)	30	5	3	22	30	95	0.316	13	Resigned from league

Rules for classification: 1) Points; 2) Goal average; 3) Goals scored
(C) Champions; (O) Play-off winners; (P) Promoted; (R) Relegated

=== Results ===
Home \ Away	BPV	BRS	BRW	CRE	DRW	GRI	LEI	LIN	LIV	LOU	MCI	NEW	NWH	NTC	ROT	WOO
Burslem Port Vale		1–0	2–2	2–1	3–3	1–4	1–1	0–1	5–4	1–1	0–1	2–0	3–0	0–4	4–0	0–2
Burton Swifts	2–1		0–2	1–1	1–2	2–1	0–2	4–0	0–7	1–2	1–4	3–1	4–1	0–0	2–0	3–2
Burton Wanderers	2–1	2–1		4–0	3–0	2–1	0–0	4–1	2–1	4–0	4–1	0–3	5–1	1–3	6–1	4–1
Crewe Alexandra	3–2	1–3	0–1		3–1	0–1	1–1	2–2	0–7	1–2	0–2	3–0	0–2	5–1	3–2	0–1
Darwen	8–2	3–0	3–0	6–1		3–3	4–1	5–0	0–4	1–1	2–3	4–4	3–0	2–0	10–2	1–1
Grimsby Town	6–1	3–0	2–1	2–0	5–0		7–1	4–2	1–0	2–0	5–0	2–1	4–2	3–0	4–0	1–1
Leicester Fosse	5–0	2–1	1–3	4–1	2–3	1–2		1–3	2–0	5–0	1–2	2–0	3–0	2–1	8–0	1–0
Lincoln City	4–2	1–2	1–2	6–2	1–0	2–5	2–3		0–1	4–1	1–2	4–0	2–0	2–3	5–0	1–1
Liverpool	5–1	6–1	4–1	6–1	0–0	3–1	3–1	6–1		1–0	3–1	5–1	7–1	3–0	10–1	3–0
Loughborough	3–0	2–2	1–1	4–1	4–1	0–1	1–4	3–0	2–4		2–4	1–0	3–3	1–3	3–0	2–1
Manchester City	1–0	1–1	1–1	4–0	4–1	2–1	2–0	4–0	1–1	5–1		5–2	2–1	2–0	2–0	1–0
Newcastle United	4–2	5–0	4–0	6–0	7–2	1–5	1–0	5–0	1–0	3–0	4–1		2–1	5–1	6–1	3–1
Newton Heath	2–1	5–0	1–2	5–0	4–0	3–2	2–0	5–5	5–2	2–0	1–1	2–1		3–0	3–0	5–1
Notts County	7–2	5–0	1–4	6–0	4–1	5–3	1–2	2–0	2–3	2–0	3–0	0–1	0–2		0–0	3–4
Rotherham Town	0–2	1–4	1–6	4–0	3–0	1–0	2–0	2–2	0–5	4–0	2–3	1–1	2–3	1–0		3–0
Woolwich Arsenal	2–1	5–0	3–0	7–0	1–3	3–1	1–1	4–0	0–2	6–0	0–1	2–1	2–1	2–0	5–0	

Updated to match(es) played on unknown. Source: Ian Laschke: Rothmans Book of Football League Records 1888–89 to 1978–79. Macdonald and Jane’s, London & Sydney, 1980.
Legend: Blue = home team win; Yellow = draw; Red = away team win.

=== Maps ===
Locations of the Football League Second Division teams

== Test Matches ==
The Football League test matches were a set of play-offs, in which the bottom First Division teams faced the top Second Division teams.

The format changed from previous seasons, with the number of participants reduced from six to four (two from each division). Each First Division team played both Second Division teams in a mini league format. The top two finishers were then considered for election for First Division membership, whilst the bottom two finishers would be invited to play in the Second Division.

The First Division teams, if finishing in the top two, would retain their places in the division. If a Second Division team does so, it would be considered for First Division membership through an election process. Bottom-two Second Division teams would stay in the Second Division.

=== First round ===
Team 1	Agg.	Team 2	1st leg	2nd leg
(2nd Div. Champions) Liverpool	4–0	Small Heath (1st Div. 15th)	4–0; Sat 18 Apr	0–0; Mon 20 Apr
(2nd Div. 2nd) Manchester City	2–7	West Bromwich Albion (1st Div. 16th)	1–1; Sat 18 Apr	1–6; Mon 20 Apr

=== Second round ===
Team 1	Agg.	Team 2	1st leg	2nd leg
(2nd Div. Champions) Liverpool	2–2	West Bromwich Albion (1st Div. 16th)	2–0; Sat 25 Apr	0–2; Mon 27 Apr
(2nd Div. 2nd) Manchester City	3–8	Small Heath (1st Div. 15th)	3–0; Sat 25 Apr	0–8; Mon 27 Apr

=== Table ===
Pos	Team	Pld	W	D	L	GF	GA	GD	Pts	Qualification
1	Liverpool	4	2	1	1	6	2	+4	5	Elected to play in First Division
2	West Bromwich Albion	4	2	1	1	9	4	+5	5	Elected to play in First Division
3	Small Heath	4	1	1	2	8	7	+1	3	Invited to play in Second Division
4	Manchester City	4	1	1	2	5	15	−10	3	Invited to play in Second Division

=== Consequences ===
It is likely that the league decided on re-election to the First Division and on promotion and relegation on the basis of the summary table above. It is not clear why all the four teams did not play each other, since it would only have required two more matches for each of them. It seems those teams who had lost in the first round hardly had any chance of ending up among the top teams in this system, and the election outcome effectively seems to have confirmed the first round results.

- Liverpool and West Bromwich Albion, winners of the first round matches, and appearing on the top of the summary table, were elected to play in the 1st Division the following season.
- Small Heath and Manchester City, who lost in the first round, were not elected to play in 1st Division, but were invited to play in the 2nd Division.

== Attendances ==
=== First Division ===
#	Football club	Home games	Average attendance
1	Everton FC	15	16,080
2	Aston Villa	15	12,360
3	Bolton Wanderers	15	9,535
4	The Wednesday	15	8,975
5	Derby County	15	8,360
6	Blackburn Rovers	15	7,810
7	Bury FC	15	7,800
8	Stoke FC	15	7,600
9	Preston North End	15	6,975
10	Sheffield United	15	6,865
11	Nottingham Forest	15	6,625
12	Sunderland AFC	15	6,210
13	Small Heath FC	15	6,065
14	Wolverhampton Wanderers	15	6,005
15	Burnley FC	15	5,875
16	West Bromwich Albion	15	5,660

== See also ==
- 1895–96 in English football
- 1895 in association football
- 1896 in association football
