= 1900–01 Football Tournament =

Football Tournament
- Season: 1900–01

Statistics of the Football Tournament in the 1900/1901 season.

== Overview ==
It was contested by 5 teams, and Boldklubben af 1893 won the championship.

== League standings ==
Pos	Team	Pld	W	D	L	GF	GA	GR	Pts
1	Boldklubben af 1893	8	6	0	2	23	11	2.091	12
2	Akademisk Boldklub	8	5	0	3	28	19	1.474	10
2	Boldklubben Frem	8	5	0	3	23	17	1.353	10
4	Kjøbenhavns Boldklub	8	3	0	5	15	19	0.789	6
5	Østerbros BK	8	1	0	7	9	32	0.281	2
