= 1890–91 Football Tournament =

- Season: 1890–91
- Matches played: 19
- Goals scored: 104 (5.47 per match)
- Average goals/game: 5.4

The 1890–91 Football Tournament season was the 2nd edition of competitive football in Demark.

Statistics of the Football Tournament in the 1890/1891 season. The format was slightly unusual in that all games had to have a winner.
Therefore, if the match was level after 90 minutes, extra time was played. If the match was still level after extra time, the match was replayed until a winner emerged.

== Overview ==
It was contested by 7 teams, and Kjøbenhavns Boldklub won the championship.

== League standings ==
Pos	Team	Pld	W	L	GF	GA	GR	Pts
1	Kjøbenhavns Boldklub	6	6	0	24	7	3.429	12
2	Akademisk Boldklub	6	5	1	45	5	9.000	10
3	Østerbro Boldklub	6	4	2	12	13	0.923	8
4	Boldklubben Frem	6	3	3	10	12	0.833	6
5	Melchioraner Boldklubben	5	1	4	12	16	0.750	2
6	Boldklubben Haabet	4	0	4	1	18	0.056	0
6	Olympia	5	0	5	0	33	0.000	0
