= 1958 Danish 1st Division =

13th season of Danish 1st Division

Danish 1st Division
- Season: 1958

The 1958 Danish 1st Division season was the 13th edition of Danish 1st Division annual football competition in Denmark. It was contested by 12 teams.

Aarhus Gymnastikforening unsuccessfully defended its 1957 title. Vejle Boldklub successfully pursued its 1958 title.

Statistics of Danish 1st Division in the 1958 season.

== League standings ==
Pos	Team	Pld	W	D	L	GF	GA	GD	Pts
1	Vejle Boldklub	22	14	2	6	66	32	+34	30
2	Boldklubben Frem	22	13	3	6	59	44	+15	29
3	Odense Boldklub	22	12	4	6	58	42	+16	28
4	Boldklubben 1909	22	13	2	7	49	38	+11	28
5	Esbjerg fB	22	11	4	7	54	40	+14	26
6	Aarhus Gymnastikforening	22	9	7	6	36	28	+8	25
7	Kjøbenhavns Boldklub	22	10	4	8	48	48	0	24
8	Akademisk Boldklub	22	6	5	11	35	46	−11	17
9	Køge BK	22	6	5	11	34	49	−15	17
10	Skovshoved IF	22	6	3	13	30	51	−21	15
11	AIA	22	5	4	13	36	59	−23	14
12	KFUM	22	4	3	15	32	60	−28	11

== Results ==
Home \ Away	ABK	AGF	AIA	B09	EFB	BKF	KB	KFU	KBK	OB	SKO	VBK
Akademisk BK	—	2–3	1–1	4–2	4–4	1–1	3–0	2–0	1–3	0–2	3–1	0–6
Aarhus GF	2–1	—	3–0	1–0	7–0	1–2	0–3	1–1	1–1	1–2	1–1	0–0
AI Aarhus	1–2	2–2	—	0–2	1–3	3–4	4–1	5–1	0–1	2–6	1–4	2–0
B 1909	4–2	1–1	5–1	—	3–0	1–2	3–1	0–3	3–1	2–1	4–1	2–0
Esbjerg fB	2–0	1–2	1–2	6–0	—	4–1	2–3	6–0	1–1	3–2	2–2	2–1
BK Frem	4–3	3–0	7–1	2–0	0–1	—	1–3	1–3	3–2	3–3	5–2	1–0
Kjøbenhavns BK	1–1	0–3	3–3	1–1	3–1	3–4	—	4–1	3–1	2–2	2–3	2–3
KFUM	1–1	1–2	1–4	1–4	2–4	3–5	1–2	—	4–0	0–3	0–1	2–6
Køge BK	3–1	1–1	6–1	1–4	2–6	2–2	0–2	3–2	—	2–2	1–0	1–4
Odense BK	2–1	3–0	1–1	4–5	2–1	3–2	2–3	2–0	6–2	—	0–1	4–2
Skovshoved IF	0–1	1–3	4–1	2–3	1–1	0–6	1–3	0–1	1–0	2–4	—	1–2
Vejle BK	3–1	2–1	1–0	3–0	1–3	5–0	8–3	4–4	1–0	7–2	7–1	—

Legend: Blue = home team win; Yellow = draw; Red = away team win.
