= George Lees =

George Lees may refer to:

- George Lees (footballer) (1924–1988), English amateur footballer who played for the Danish side Boldklubben Frem
- George Lees (baseball) (1895–1980), Major League Baseball catcher
- George Martin Lees (1898–1955), British soldier and geologist
- George Harmon Lees, mayor of Hamilton, Ontario, 1911–1912
