= Helge Bronée =

Danish footballer (1922–1999)

Personal information
- Full name: Helge Christian Bronée
- Date of birth: 28 March 1922
- Place of birth: Nybølle, Denmark
- Date of death: 3 June 1999 (aged 77)
- Place of death: Dronningmølle, Denmark
- Position: Centre forward

Youth career
- B.93
- HB

Senior career*
Years	Team	Apps	(Gls)
1939–1948	ØB		
1948–1950	FC Nancy		
1950–1952	Palermo	70	(22)
1952–1954	AS Roma	51	(12)
1954–1955	Juventus	29	(11)
1955–1956	Novara	27	(10)
- Rødovre BK
- B.93

International career
1945	Denmark U21	1	(2)
1945–1946	Denmark	4	(1)
- * Club domestic league appearances and goals

Helge Christian Bronée (28 March 1922 – 3 June 1999) was a Danish footballer who played four games for the amateur Denmark national football team. He moved abroad in 1948 to play professionally for French club FC Nancy, as well as Italian clubs Palermo, AS Roma, Juventus, and Novara. Adverse to any form of discipline, he was known as the playboy of European football.

== Biography ==
=== Amateur years ===
Bronée started playing football with Copenhagen clubs Boldklubben af 1893 (B.93) and Handelsstandens Boldklub (HB). He moved to Østerbros Boldklub (ØB) in 1939, where he formed a fearsome attacking partnership as a centre forward alongside inside forward Karl Aage Præst. Though rarely in top shape, Bronée was the born athlete and a great gymnast. With 26 goals in the 1945–46 Danish 2nd Division season, Bronée helped ØB win promotion for the top-flight Danish 1st Division. Bronée got his debut for the Danish national team in September 1945, where he scored the first goal in a 5–1 victory against Norway. In all, he played four games and scored one goal for Denmark. He was the topscorer of the 1946–47 Danish championship with 21 goals in 18 games, as ØB finished in fourth place in their 1st Division debut season. He moved abroad to play professionally in 1948. Due to the Danish Football Association's strict rules of amateurism, this spelled the end of his international career after four games and one goal for the national team.

=== Professional career ===
Bronée signed a contract with French team FC Nancy, and played in the club for two seasons. The life of a professional footballer improved his physical condition, as he had been slightly chubby when playing in Denmark. In 1950, he moved on to Italian football. He played two years at Palermo, in the midtable of the top-flight Serie A championship. In 1952, he moved on to AS Roma, with whom he finished in sixth place of the Serie A for two consecutive seasons. Bronée was reunited with Karl Aage Præst, when he played a single season for Juventus, with another sixth place the result. He moved to relegation battlers Novara in 1955. Despite 10 goals from Bronée, Novara's 1955–56 season resulted in relegation.

During his professional career, Helge Bronée never stayed long at the same club. He was a single-minded player, adverse to tactical discipline. Off the field, he liked the high life, and was known as the playboy of European football. However, his many transfer moves always included large fees, as he had the capability to turn any game in his favor, provided he was in the right mood.

Bronée moved back to Denmark in 1956, but the Danish Football Association (DBU) barred him and other ex-professionals from playing in the amateur-only Danish leagues. The ex-professionals began playing a series of unofficial, but popular, exhibition matches, centered around Karl Aage Præst's vacation home in Liseleje. In 1958, DBU decided to allow ex-professionals into Danish football following a two-year quarantine. Bronée played for Rødovre BK, before ending his career with his first senior club, B.93.
