= 1896–97 Football Tournament =

Tournament details
- Country: Denmark
- Teams: 5

Final positions
- Champions: Kjøbenhavns Boldklub (2nd title)
- Runner-up: Akademisk Boldklub

Tournament statistics
- Matches played: 9
- Goals scored: 48 (5.33 per match)
- Top goal scorer(s): Johannes Gandil (5 goals)

The 1896–97 Football Tournament was the 8th staging of The Football Tournament.

== Overview ==
It was contested by 5 teams, and Kjøbenhavns Boldklub won the championship for the second time in their history.

== League standings ==
Pos	Team	Pld	W	L	GF	GA	GR	Pts
1	Kjøbenhavns Boldklub	4	4	0	13	4	3.250	8
2	Akademisk Boldklub	4	3	1	14	6	2.333	6
3	Cricketklubben af 1893	3	1	2	10	7	1.429	2
3	Østerbros Boldklub	3	1	2	6	14	0.429	2
5	Boldklubben Frem	4	0	4	5	17	0.294	0

Source: 1896–97 results
