= 1902–03 Football Tournament =

Football Tournament
- Season: 1902–03

Statistics of the Football Tournament in the 1902–1903 season.

== Overview ==
It was contested by five teams, and Kjøbenhavns Boldklub won the championship.

== League standings ==
Pos	Team	Pld	W	D	L	GF	GA	GR	Pts
1	Kjøbenhavns Boldklub	8	6	2	0	17	6	2.833	14
2	Boldklubben Frem	8	6	0	2	29	12	2.417	12
3	Boldklubben af 1893	7	3	1	3	20	19	1.053	7
4	Østerbros BK	7	1	1	5	8	22	0.364	3
5	Akademisk Boldklub	8	1	0	7	14	29	0.483	2
