= Stævnet =

Danish football club

- Full name: Det Internationale Fodboldstævne (The International Event of Football)
- Nickname: Copenhagen XI
- Short name: Stævnet
- Founded: 1904
- Dissolved: 1994
- Ground: Idrætsparken, Copenhagen, Denmark
- Capacity: ca. 50,000
- League: Inter-Cities Fairs Cup
- 1963–64: 1st round
Home colours	Away colours

Stævnet (Danish: the event or the meeting) or Copenhagen XI were a Danish association football representative team which had its prime before 1970, however it was active until 1994. Stævnet participated in the Inter-Cities Fairs Cup, the precursor of UEFA Cup, in 1955–58, 1958–60, 1961–62, 1962–63 and 1963–64.

The Copenhagen XI only competed in the above-mentioned editions of the Inter-Cities Fairs Cups. All other tournaments involving a Copenhagen team were contested by individual clubs from Copenhagen. Usually Stævnet would feature players from its member clubs exclusively, but players were often borrowed from other Danish clubs. In the two matches against Chelsea F.C. in 1958 the team featured 8 and 7 Frem players respectively.

Most of the matches played by Stævnet were exhibition matches either against its Danish competitor Alliancen, or against foreign, often British, teams, sometimes displaying a common Stævnet/Alliancen team.

On 10 May 1960 it played the Brazilian 1958 World Champions in an unofficial international arranged in collaboration with the Danish FA and Alliancen. The Brazilian team won the match by 4–3. The Danish goals were scored by Harald Nielsen (2) and Henning Enoksen (1).

== Member clubs ==
Stævnet had a total of 11 member clubs. The clubs written in bold are denoted as the Stævnet Clubs (Danish: Stævneklubberne). These clubs are considered core members.

Year of membership is annotated in brackets.

- **B 93** (1904)
- **KB** (1904)
- **AB** (1912)
- **B 1903** (1912)
- **Frem** (1912)
- Fremad Amager (1949)
- ØB (1949)
- Køge (1955)
- Skovshoved (1955)
- Hvidovre (1964)
- KB (1976)

== Match details ==
=== Inter-Cities Fairs Cup ===
(Spain) CF Barcelona 6–2 Stævnet – 25 December 1955

Scorers: 1–0 Areta 8', 2–0 Areta 10', 3–0 Tajeda 32', 4–0 Villaverde 41', 5–0 Kubala 59', 5–1 Lundberg (pen) 65', 6–1 Areta 81', 6–2 Lundberg 85'.

Stævnet 1–1 CF Barcelona (Spain) – 26 April 1956

Scorers: 1–0 Lundberg (pen) 60', 1–1 Villaverde 85'.

Barcelona won the group with 3pts vs 1pt

–

Stævnet/BK Frem 1–3 Chelsea F.C. (England) – 30 September 1958

Team: Bent Koch (Frem) – Arne Kjeldsen (Frem), Verner Nielsen (AB) – Harald Gronemann (Frem), George Lees (Frem), Egon Henriksen (Frem) – Knud Petersen (Frem), Mogens Machon (Brønshøj BK), Søren Andersen (Frem), John Hansen (Frem), Jens Peder Hansen (Esbjerg fB).
Scorers: 0–1 Harrison 24', 1–1 Gronemann 26', 1–2 Greaves 54', 1–3 Nicholas 90'.

(England) Chelsea F.C. 4–1 Stævnet/BK Frem – 4 November 1958

Team: Per Henriksen (Frem) – Arne Kjeldsen (Frem), Christen Brøgger (AB) – Harald Gronemann (Frem), George Lees (Frem), Egon Henriksen (Frem) – Jens Peder Hansen (Esbjerg fB), Villy Schøne Hansen (Skovshoved), Søren Andersen (Frem), John Hansen (Frem), Poul Mejer (Vejle B).
Scorers: 1–0 own goal (Lees) 5', 1–1 V.S. Hansen 7', 2–1 Greaves 40', 3–1 Greaves 72'.

Chelsea won 7–2 on aggregate

–

(Socialist Federal Republic of Yugoslavia) Dinamo Zagreb 2–2 Stævnet – 7 September 1961

Scorers: 1–0 Remete 29', 1–1 Rasmussen 31', 1–2 Andersen 40', 2–2 Marković 70'.

Stævnet 2–7 Dinamo Zagreb (Socialist Federal Republic of Yugoslavia) – 4 October 1961

Scorers: Stævnet: Sørensen, Ravn; Dinamo Zagreb: Jerković (2), Cvitković (2), Šantek, Knez, Matuš.

Zagreb won 9–4 on aggregate

–

(Scotland) Hibernian F.C. 4–0 Stævnet – 3 October 1962

Scorers: 1–0 Byrne 17', 2–0 Baker 20', 3–0 M. Stevenson 24', 4–0 own goal (Rønnov) 30'.

Stævnet 2–3 Hibernian F.C. (Scotland) – 23 October 1962

Scorers: 1–0 Dyrmose 17', 1–1 Byrne 33', 1–2 M. Stevenson 47', 1–3 M. Stevenson 63', 2–3 Christensen 67'.

Hibernian won 7–2 on aggregate

–

Stævnet 1–7 Arsenal F.C. (England) – 25 September 1963

Scorers: 0–1 MacLeod 9', 0–2 Baker 24', 0–3 Strong 27', 0–4 Strong 35', 0–5 Strong 40', 0–6 Baker 46', 0–7 Baker 71', 1–7 Ole Jørgensen 81'.

(England) Arsenal F.C. 2–3 Stævnet – 22 October 1963

Scorers: 1–0 Skirton 1', 2–0 Baker 30', 1–2 Dyrmose 30', 2–2 Dyrmose 78', 2–3 Dyrmose 88'.

Arsenal won 9–4 on aggregate

=== Noted friendlies ===
Stævnet 2–3 Sheffield Wednesday (England) – 25 May 1911

Note: Grand opening of Idrætsparken
–

Stævnet 1–2 Rangers F.C. (Scotland) – 5 June 1921

Scorers: Stævnet: S. Thorsteinsson
Attendance: 22,000
–

Stævnet vs. Blackpool (England) – 1947

Blackpool team: Stanley Matthews
–

Stævnet/Alliancen 1–2 FC Dynamo Moscow (Soviet Union) – 1954

Dynamo Moscow team: Lev Yashin
Scorers: Stævnet/Alliancen: Poul Erik Petersen
Attendance: 50,000
–

Stævnet 3–4 Brazil – 10 May 1960

Stævnet: Henry From (Aarhus GF), Poul Andersen (Skovshoved IF), Hans Christian Nielsen (Aarhus GF), Poul Jensen (Vejle B) – Bent Hansen (B 1903), Flemming Nielsen (AB) – Poul Pedersen (AIA Aarhus), John Danielsen (B 1909), Harald Nielsen (Frederikshavn fl), Henning Enoksen (Vejle B), Jørn Sørensen (KB)
Brazil: Gilmar, Djalma Santos, Bellini, Vítor, Nílton Santos, Zito, Chinesinho, Garrincha, Quarentinha, Pelé, Pepe.
Scorers: 1–0 H. Nielsen, 1–1 Quarentinha, 2–1 H. Nielsen, 2–2 Pepe, 2–3 Quarentinha, 2–4 Chinesinho, 3–4 Enoksen.
Attendance: 52,000
–

Stævnet 4–5 Benfica (Portugal) – 21 August 1962

== See also ==
- London XI
- Alliancen
- Danish national team
- Nordic Cup
