= 1911 Copenhagen Football Championship =

Danish National Football Tournament
- Season: 1911

Statistics of Copenhagen Football Championship in the 1911 season.

== Baneklubberne Tournaments ==
featuring clubs that owned their playing ground

Pos	Team	Pld	W	D	L	GF	GA	GR	Pts
1	Kjøbenhavns Boldklub	6	5	1	0	22	6	3.667	11
2	Akademisk Boldklub	6	2	2	2	16	25	0.640	6
3	Boldklubben Frem	6	2	0	4	21	22	0.955	4
4	Boldklubben af 1893	6	1	1	4	15	21	0.714	3

== KBU League (official) ==
featuring clubs without own playing ground

Pos	Team	Pld	W	D	L	GF	GA	GR	Pts
1	Østerbros BK	5	4	1	0	10	2	5.000	9
2	Boldklubben 1903	5	4	0	1	13	4	3.250	8
3	Velo Hellerup	5	2	2	1	10	9	1.111	6
4	Lydia	5	1	1	3	5	8	0.625	3
5	KFUM	5	0	2	3	5	11	0.455	2
5	Viktoria	5	0	2	3	5	14	0.357	2
