= 1897–98 Football Tournament =

Tournament details
- Country: Denmark
- Teams: 6

Final positions
- Champions: Kjøbenhavns Boldklub (3rd title)
- Runner-up: Akademisk Boldklub

Tournament statistics
- Matches played: 3
- Goals scored: 60 (20 per match)

The 1897–98 Football Tournament was the 9th staging of The Football Tournament.

This tournament rescued the old format of the first edition where in case of a tie, extra-time was played, and if the match was still level, then the match would be replayed until a winner emerged.

== Overview ==
It was contested by 6 teams, and Christianshavns BK managed to play only one match in the tournament, which was a 0–14 loss to Akademisk Boldklub, before the club was disbanded on 29 November 1897. The team's remaining matches are included in the standings as victories for opponents with the figures 0-0. Kjøbenhavns Boldklub won the championship for the third time in their history after beating AB in the decisive match to win the title, 2–0 after extra-time.

== League standings ==
| Pos | Team | Pld | W | L | GF | GA | GR | Pts |
|---|---|---|---|---|---|---|---|---|
| 1 | Kjøbenhavns Boldklub | 5 | 5 | 0 | 13 | 2 | 6.500 | 10 |
| 2 | Akademisk Boldklub | 5 | 4 | 1 | 29 | 3 | 9.667 | 8 |
| 3 | Boldklubben af 1893 | 5 | 3 | 2 | 7 | 9 | 0.778 | 6 |
| 4 | Boldklubben Frem | 5 | 2 | 3 | 10 | 9 | 1.111 | 4 |
| 5 | Østerbros BK | 5 | 1 | 4 | 1 | 23 | 0.043 | 2 |
| 6 | Christianshavn BK | 5 | 0 | 5 | 0 | 14 | 0.000 | 0 |

Source: 1897–98 results
