= Gronemann =

Gronemann is a surname. Notable people with the surname include:

- Henning Gronemann (1929–2016), Danish amateur football player
- Sammy Gronemann (1875–1952), German-born Zionist activist, author and satirist
- Vanessa Gronemann (born 1989), German politician from Alliance 90/The Greens
