= 1892–93 Football Tournament =

Tournament details
- Country: Denmark
- Teams: 5

Final positions
- Champions: Akademisk Boldklub (2nd title)
- Runner-up: Kjøbenhavns Boldklub

Tournament statistics
- Matches played: 15
- Goals scored: 94 (6.27 per match)

The 1892–93 Football Tournament was the 4th staging of The Football Tournament.

The format was slightly unusual in that all games had to have a winner. Therefore, if the match was level after 90 minutes, extra time was played. If the match was still level after extra-time, the match was replayed until a winner emerged.

== Overview ==
It was contested by 5 teams, and Akademisk Boldklub won the championship.

== League standings ==
Pos	Team	Pld	W	L	GF	GA	GR	Pts
1	Akademisk Boldklub	8	8	0	30	4	7.500	16
2	Kjøbenhavns Boldklub	8	6	2	32	4	8.000	12
3	Boldklubben Frem	8	4	4	18	13	1.385	8
4	Fri	8	1	7	4	60	0.067	2
4	Østerbro Boldklub	8	1	7	10	13	0.769	2

Source: 1892–93 results
