= Valby Idrætspark =

Sports venue in Copenhagen, Denmark

Coordinates: 55°38′49.04″N 12°30′42.65″E

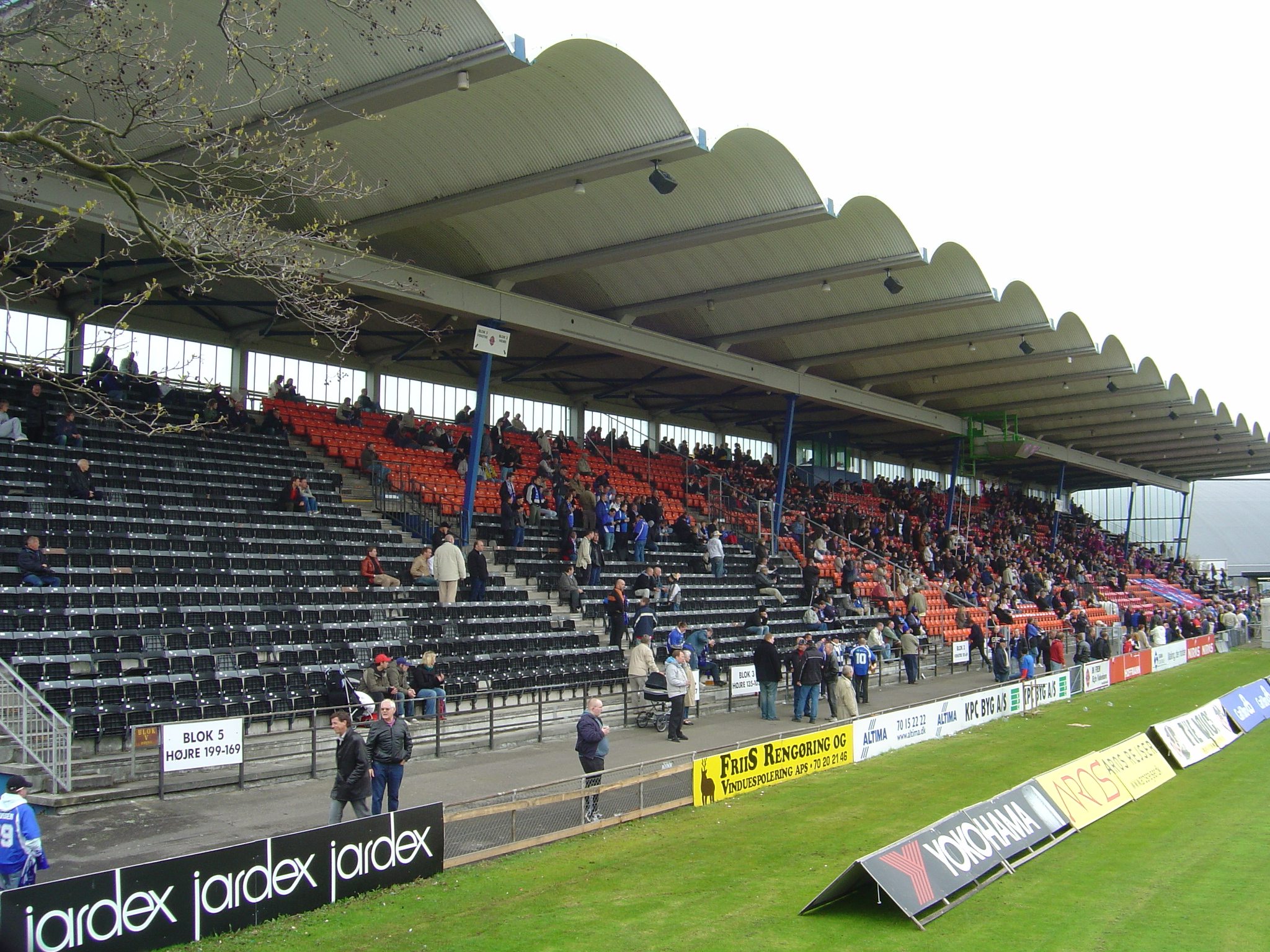
- Main stand
- Interactive map of Valby Idrætspark
- Address: Julius Andersens Vej 1 Copenhagen; Denmark; 2450
- Location: Valby
- Owner: Copenhagen municipality
- Operator: Københavns Idrætspark (KI)
- Capacity: 12,000 (4,400 seated)
- Surface: Artificial Grass
- Field size: 102 x 75 m.

Construction
- Opened: 1913; 113 years ago
- Renovated: 1965 and 2003

Tenants
- Boldklubben Frem; BK Fremad Valby (1913–2025); Østerbro IF

Valby Idrætspark is a sports venue in Valby, Copenhagen, Denmark. It is currently used primarily for football matches and is the home ground of Boldklubben Frem, Fremad Valby, Politiets Idrætsforening and Vigerslev Boldklub. Valby Idrætspark has hosted a total of nine Danish FA-recognized internationals. The stadium also hosts B-Liga club Østerbro IF.

== History ==
Valby Idrætspark is located on the former Valby Common. It was first used for football in 1913. The lack of proper facilities for the football clubs were subject to discussions between Valby Boldspil and the City but plans to build a large club house went on hold with the outbreak of World War I. In 1922, the plans were revived but once again without result due to disagreements over the financing. In 1926, a total of 10 football clubs used Valby Fælled but by then the conditions had become so poor that most of them had to find other premises, mostly on Øster Fælled (The Rast Common) in Østerbro.

In the 1930s, plans arose to build an extensive sports complex on Valby Fælled as part of a possible Danish bid for hosting the Olympic Games. The plans involved a football stadium, 18 football pitches for training, a club house for Boldklubben Frem and another one for the other clubs, an aquatic stadium, tennis courts, four halls for gymnastics, boxing, wrestling and weight lifting, 20 shooting ranges, bowling court, restaurant, offices, changing facilities and an indoor arena. Work began in 1937 but the plans were affected by the outbreak of World War II and the German Occupation of Denmark. BK Frem moved from Enghavevej to their new club house on 7 March 1942. The name of the area was officially changed from Valby Fælled to Valby Idrætspark on 18 August 1942. The opening game was played between BK Frem and a selected team with seven players from BK Fremad Valby, three players from Valby and one from Als. Valby Idrætspark hosted 449 football matches in 1949 and 507 in 1950.

In 1964, Valby Idrætspark was used by a total of 126 sports clubs of which 45 were football clubs. The new Banbury tribune, with inspiration from Coventry, was inaugurated on 7 September 1969 with a match between BK Frem and Esbjerg.

In 2007, Copenhagen Municipality predicted that the main stand would last another 5–10 years. As of April 2007 major investments are put on hold as a decision on the construction of a new stadium is being awaited.

In January 2016 the municipality ordered a renovation of the existing stadium, worth €3 million. Thus cancelling plans for a New Stadium in the near future.
The Renovation is due ultimo 2017. The city greenlit an expansion plan for the grounds in August 2026, with a prospected 7-10 year construction period.

== Valby Stadion ==
Valby Stadion is used by BK Frem and Fremad Valby. The stadium has a capacity of 12.000, where 4.400 of them are seats.

== See also ==
- New Valby Idrætspark
