= John 'Tune' Kristiansen =

Danish footballer and manager (born 1955)

Personal information
- Full name: John Kristiansen
- Date of birth: 12 February 1955 (age 71)
- Place of birth: Denmark
- Position: Forward

Youth career
- Køge Boldklub

Senior career*
Years	Team	Apps	(Gls)
19XX–1980	Køge Boldklub		
1980	Boldklubben Frem		
1980–1986	Herfølge Boldklub		
1987	Ringsted Boldklub		
1988	Køge Boldklub		

Managerial career
- 1991–1993: Herfølge Boldklub
- 1993–1995: AIK 65 Strøby
- 1996–1998: Boldklubben Frem
- 1998–1999: Herfølge Boldklub (youth)
- 1999–2000: Haslev FC
- 2000–2003: Køge Boldklub (assistant)
- 2003–2004: Køge Boldklub
- 2005–2006: FC Roskilde
- 2006–2008: Skovshoved IF
- 2008–2009: Køge Boldklub (assistant)
- 2009–2010: Greve Fodbold (reserves)
- 2010–2011: Boldklubben Frem
- * Club domestic league appearances and goals

John 'Tune' Kristiansen (born 12 February 1955) is a Danish professional Association football manager, until recently was working as head coach of Boldklubben Frem.

As an active footballer, Tune played in the forward position. He started his career with top-flight club Køge Boldklub, and participated in Køge's international games against FC Bayern Munich. He moved to BK Frem in 1980, and scored three goals in 26 games for the club. He then moved to Herfølge BK. He was deemed surplus at Herfølge in 1986, and played one season at lower-league club Ringsted BK, before he ended his career with Køge following the 1988 season. In all, he scored 32 goals in 176 matches for Køge.

Having ended his active career, Tune began a career as a part-time coach. In 1991, he became the new manager of Herfølge BK but he was sacked in 1993 after losing an important game against Brønshøj BK. He later coached his former club BK Frem, guiding the club to promotion for the second-tier Danish 1st Division in 1997. In October 2000, Tune signed his first contract as a fully professional coach, as he was put in charge of the Danish Football Association youth development program at Køge Boldklub. He was also assistant to Køge manager Henrik Jensen. He was named Køge manager in September 2003, but was surprisingly fired from the position in September 2004 by chairman Clive Stapleton, despite good results.

He went on to coach 2nd Division club FC Roskilde in January 2005, as well as Qualifications Series club Skovshoved IF. Later he became assistant manager for Jimmy Kastrup at Køge Boldklub. In July 2010, he was appointed manager of BK Frem. On 2 November 2011 he announced that he would step down as manager on 31 December 2011 for personal reasons.
