= New Valby Idrætspark =

Proposed football stadium in Valby, Copenhagen, Denmark

- Full name: none
- Location: Valby; Copenhagen; Denmark
- Capacity: Ca. 10,000

Construction
- Groundbreaking: 2010 (Frem estimate); 2012 (Municipality estimate)
- Opened: 2016 (Frem estimate)
- Architect: SLA

Tenant
- Boldklubben Frem

New Valby Idrætspark was a proposed football stadium to be built in Valby, Copenhagen, Denmark. If built, the stadium would replace Valby Idrætspark, as the home ground for Boldklubben Frem.

In 2006 the Copenhagen Municipality predicted that the main stand of the current Valby Idrætspark would last another 5–10 years. As of April 2007 major investments in the current stadium are put on hold as a decision on the construction of a new stadium is being awaited. A final decision was expected in April 2008.

Hans Hermansen, managing director of BK Frem, has indicated that according to the plan, the construction of a new stadium should commence no later than 2010. However the municipality estimated 2012. Frem has suggested that it might be completed by 2016.

In January 2016 the municipality has ordered a renovation of the existing stadium, worth 3 mio €, thus cancelling plans for a new stadium in the near future. The renovation is due ultimo 2017.

== See also ==
- Valby Idrætspark
