= Alliancen =

Danish football club

- Sport: Football
- Founded: 1940; 85 years ago
- Location: Denmark

Alliancen (Danish for the alliance) is a Danish association football organisation founded in 1940 by Fremad Amager, HIK, KFUMs Boldklub, B 1908 and ØB. Køge, Brønshøj, Skovshoved IF, Vanløse, Næstved and Esbjerg all joined later. The organisation was originally created in order to let some of the most talented players compete against foreign players, either in Denmark or abroad.

== Overview ==
Most of the matches played by Alliancen were exhibition matches either against its Danish competitor Stævnet, or against foreign teams, sometimes displaying a common Stævnet/Alliancen team. In one game, Alliancen played in front of 120,000 spectators.

When European tournaments were established in the late 1950s, the need for international matches diminished, and the activity of matches against foreign teams was gradually reduced until it completely stopped in the 1970s. Instead, Alliancen concentrated on organizing youth and women's tournaments as well as arranging travels for top matches all over Europe.

In 2015, Alliancen celebrated its 75-year anniversary.

== See also ==
- Stævnet
