= Thor Høholt =

Danish footnaller (born 2001)

Personal information
- Date of birth: 19 March 2001 (age 25)
- Place of birth: Asnæs, Denmark
- Height: 1.88 m (6 ft 2 in)
- Positions: Centre-back; defensive midfielder

Team information
- Current team: BK Frem
- Number: 4

Youth career
- –2019: Nordsjælland
- 2019–2020: Lyngby

Senior career*
Years	Team	Apps	(Gls)
2020–2023	Lyngby	3	(0)
2022	→ B36 Tórshavn (loan)	17	(0)
2022–2023	→ Nykøbing (loan)	23	(0)
2023–2025	Nykøbing	16	(1)
2025–	BK Frem	22	(3)
- * Club domestic league appearances and goals as of 4 October 2026

Thor Høholt (born 19 March 2001) is a Danish professional footballer who plays as a centre-back for BK Frem.

== Career ==
Born in Asnæs, Odsherred, Høholt developed through the Nordsjælland academy before joining Lyngby at under-19 level, where he served as captain of the U19 team.

He made his senior debut for Lyngby on 8 July 2020 in a 1–1 Danish Superliga draw against SønderjyskE. Høholt was part of the squad that was relegated to the 1st Division on 9 May 2021 after a defeat to bottom-placed AC Horsens.

On 4 June 2021, he signed a two-year contract extension and was promoted to the first team ahead of the new season. He made his first senior start on 4 August in a 9–0 win over Østerbro IF in the first round of the Danish Cup.

To gain playing experience, Høholt was loaned to Faroese side B36 Tórshavn on 25 January 2022, a deal later extended until the end of August.

On 31 August 2022, he joined Nykøbing FC on loan for the remainder of the year. Lyngby confirmed his departure at the end of the 2022–23 season following the expiration of his contract.

On 8 July 2023, Høholt rejoined Nykøbing FC on a permanent basis, signing a contract through June 2025. He was sidelined for the entirety of 2024 due to an overuse injury initially diagnosed as a minor groin strain, later identified as a labral tear and hip impingement sustained during a match against Middelfart on 21 October 2023. He had not featured for the club since November 2023. Following an initial period of misdiagnosis and conservative treatment, he underwent surgery in October 2024 at a private hospital in Søborg, after a prolonged wait in the public healthcare system. As of December 2024, he had entered early-stage rehabilitation and expressed optimism about returning before the end of his contract. Høholt left Nykøbing FC in June 2025.

On 30 July 2025, Høholt joined Danish 3rd Division side BK Frem.

== Career statistics ==
As of match played 4 October 2026

Appearances and goals by club, season and competition
Club	Season	League			National cup		Europe		Other		Total	
Club	Season	Division	Apps	Goals	Apps	Goals	Apps	Goals	Apps	Goals	Apps	Goals
Lyngby	2019–20	Danish Superliga	1	0	0	0	—		—		1	0
Lyngby	2020–21	Danish Superliga	1	0	0	0	—		—		1	0
Lyngby	2021–22	Danish 1st Division	1	0	2	0	—		—		3	0
Lyngby	Total		3	0	2	0	0	0	0	0	5	0
B36 Tórshavn (loan)	2022	Faroe Islands Premier League	17	0	2	0	6 (Note: Appearances in UEFA Conference League)	0	1 (Note: Appearance in Faroe Islands Super Cup)	0	26	0
Nykøbing (loan)	2022–23	Danish 1st Division	23	0	2	0	—		—		25	0
Nykøbing	2023–24	Danish 1st Division	16	1	3	0	—		—		19	1
Nykøbing	Total		39	1	5	0	—		—		44	1
BK Frem	2025–26	Danish 3rd Division	15	3	1	0	—		—		16	3
BK Frem	2026–27	Danish 3rd Division	7	0	3	0	—		—		10	0
BK Frem	Total		22	3	4	0	0	0	0	0	26	3
Career total			81	4	13	0	6	0	1	0	101	4
