= 1893–94 Football League =

6th season of the Football League

The Football League
- Season: 1893–94
- Champions: Aston Villa
- Relegated: Middlesbrough Ironopolis; Northwich Victoria
- New Clubs in League: Liverpool, Newcastle United, Woolwich Arsenal, Middlesbrough Ironopolis, Rotherham Town

The 1893–94 season was the sixth season of The Football League.

== Final league tables ==
Beginning with the season 1894–95, clubs finishing level on points were separated according to goal average (goals scored divided by goals conceded). In case one or more teams had the same goal difference, this system favoured those teams who had scored fewer goals. The goal average system was eventually scrapped beginning with the 1976–77 season. Since the goal average was used for this purpose for such a long time, it is presented in the tables below even for the seasons prior to 1894–95.

During the first five seasons of the league, the re-election process concerned the clubs which finished in the bottom four of the league.

Match results are drawn from The Rec.Sport.Soccer Statistics Foundation website and Rothmans for the First Division and Rothmans for the Second Division. The result of the match on 25 November 1893 between Wolves and Stoke is given in many newspapers as a win for Wolves by 4–2, which is the result included in these tables and the book published by the Football League in 1937–38. Most subsequent lists of scores depend on that publication. The Times on Monday, the 27th gives the score as 5–2 and local Midland newspapers also show 5–2, listing the five goal scorers. This curious discrepancy has never been explained.

The Second Division was expanded from twelve to fifteen teams, with the election of Liverpool, Middlesbrough Ironopolis, Newcastle United, Rotherham Town and Woolwich Arsenal and the resignation of Accrington and Bootle. Woolwich Arsenal became the first team from the south of England to participate in the Football League.

== First Division ==
First Division
- Season: 1893–94
- Champions: Aston Villa; 1st English title
- Relegated: Darwen; Newton Heath
- Matches: 240
- Goals: 939 (3.91 per match)
- Top goalscorer: Jack Southworth (27 goals)
- Biggest home win: Aston Villa 9–0 Darwen (26 December 1893)
- Biggest away win: Wolverhampton Wanderers 0–8 West Bromwich Albion (27 December 1893)
- Highest scoring: Everton 8–1 Darwen (21 October 1893); West Bromwich Albion 3–6 Aston Villa (21 October 1893); Everton 8–1 The Wednesday (23 December 1893); Aston Villa 9–0 Darwen (26 December 1893); Burnley 3–6 Aston Villa (7 April 1894)
- Longest winning run: 6 matches Aston Villa; Sheffield United; Sunderland
- Longest unbeaten run: 7 matches Nottingham Forest; Sheffield United; Wolverhampton Wanderers
- Longest losing run: 11 matches Newton Heath
- Highest attendance: 27,500; Everton 7–1 Sunderland (30 September 1893)
- Lowest attendance: 400; Derby County 2–1 Darwen (18 November 1893)
- Average attendance: 7,012

| Pos | Team | Pld | W | D | L | GF | GA | GAv | Pts | Relegation |
|---|---|---|---|---|---|---|---|---|---|---|
| 1 | Aston Villa (C) | 30 | 19 | 6 | 5 | 84 | 42 | 2.000 | 44 | |
| 2 | Sunderland | 30 | 17 | 4 | 9 | 72 | 44 | 1.636 | 38 | |
| 3 | Derby County | 30 | 16 | 4 | 10 | 73 | 62 | 1.177 | 36 | |
| 4 | Blackburn Rovers | 30 | 16 | 2 | 12 | 69 | 53 | 1.302 | 34 | |
| 5 | Burnley | 30 | 15 | 4 | 11 | 61 | 51 | 1.196 | 34 | |
| 6 | Everton | 30 | 15 | 3 | 12 | 90 | 57 | 1.579 | 33 | |
| 7 | Nottingham Forest | 30 | 14 | 4 | 12 | 57 | 48 | 1.188 | 32 | |
| 8 | West Bromwich Albion | 30 | 14 | 4 | 12 | 66 | 59 | 1.119 | 32 | |
| 9 | Wolverhampton Wanderers | 30 | 14 | 3 | 13 | 52 | 63 | 0.825 | 31 | |
| 10 | Sheffield United | 30 | 13 | 5 | 12 | 47 | 61 | 0.770 | 31 | |
| 11 | Stoke | 30 | 13 | 3 | 14 | 65 | 79 | 0.823 | 29 | |
| 12 | The Wednesday | 30 | 9 | 8 | 13 | 48 | 57 | 0.842 | 26 | |
| 13 | Bolton Wanderers | 30 | 10 | 4 | 16 | 38 | 52 | 0.731 | 24 | |
| 14 | Preston North End (O) | 30 | 10 | 3 | 17 | 44 | 56 | 0.786 | 23 | Qualification for test matches |
| 15 | Darwen (R) | 30 | 7 | 5 | 18 | 37 | 83 | 0.446 | 19 | Qualification for test matches |
| 16 | Newton Heath (R) | 30 | 6 | 2 | 22 | 36 | 72 | 0.500 | 14 | Qualification for test matches |

Source: World Football
Rules for classification: 1) Points; 2) Goal average; 3) Goals scored
(C) Champions; (O) Play-off winners; (R) Relegated

=== Results ===
| Home \ Away | AST | BLB | BOL | BUR | DRW | DER | EVE | NWH | NOT | PNE | SHU | STK | SUN | WED | WBA | WOL |
|---|---|---|---|---|---|---|---|---|---|---|---|---|---|---|---|---|
| Aston Villa | | 2–1 | 2–3 | 4–0 | 9–0 | 1–1 | 3–1 | 5–1 | 3–1 | 2–0 | 4–0 | 5–1 | 2–1 | 3–0 | 3–2 | 1–1 |
| Blackburn Rovers | 2–0 | | 0–1 | 3–2 | 4–1 | 0–2 | 4–3 | 4–0 | 6–1 | 1–0 | 4–1 | 5–0 | 4–3 | 5–1 | 3–0 | 3–0 |
| Bolton Wanderers | 0–1 | 2–1 | | 2–0 | 1–0 | 1–1 | 0–1 | 2–0 | 1–1 | 0–3 | 0–1 | 4–1 | 2–0 | 1–1 | 0–3 | 2–0 |
| Burnley | 3–6 | 1–0 | 2–1 | | 5–1 | 3–1 | 2–1 | 4–1 | 3–1 | 4–1 | 4–1 | 4–0 | 1–0 | 0–1 | 3–0 | 4–2 |
| Darwen | 1–1 | 2–3 | 1–3 | 0–0 | | 2–3 | 3–3 | 1–0 | 0–4 | 2–1 | 3–3 | 3–1 | 0–3 | 2–1 | 2–1 | 3–1 |
| Derby County | 0–3 | 5–2 | 6–1 | 3–3 | 2–1 | | 7–3 | 2–0 | 3–4 | 2–1 | 2–1 | 5–2 | 1–4 | 3–3 | 2–3 | 4–1 |
| Everton | 4–2 | 2–2 | 3–2 | 4–3 | 8–1 | 1–2 | | 2–0 | 4–0 | 2–3 | 2–3 | 6–2 | 7–1 | 8–1 | 7–1 | 3–0 |
| Newton Heath | 1–3 | 5–1 | 2–2 | 3–2 | 0–1 | 2–6 | 0–3 | | 1–1 | 1–3 | 0–2 | 6–2 | 2–4 | 1–2 | 4–1 | 1–0 |
| Nottingham Forest | 1–2 | 0–0 | 1–0 | 5–0 | 4–1 | 4–2 | 3–2 | 2–0 | | 4–2 | 1–1 | 2–0 | 1–2 | 1–0 | 2–3 | 7–1 |
| Preston North End | 2–5 | 0–1 | 1–0 | 1–2 | 4–1 | 1–0 | 2–4 | 2–0 | 0–2 | | 3–0 | 3–3 | 1–2 | 1–0 | 3–1 | 1–3 |
| Sheffield United | 3–0 | 3–2 | 4–2 | 1–0 | 2–1 | 1–2 | 0–3 | 3–1 | 0–2 | 1–1 | | 3–3 | 1–0 | 1–1 | 0–2 | 3–2 |
| Stoke | 3–3 | 3–1 | 5–0 | 4–2 | 3–1 | 3–1 | 3–1 | 3–1 | 2–1 | 2–1 | 5–0 | | 2–0 | 4–1 | 3–1 | 0–3 |
| Sunderland | 1–1 | 2–3 | 2–1 | 2–2 | 4–0 | 5–0 | 1–0 | 4–1 | 2–0 | 6–3 | 4–1 | 4–0 | | 1–1 | 2–1 | 6–0 |
| The Wednesday | 2–2 | 4–2 | 2–1 | 0–1 | 5–0 | 4–0 | 1–1 | 0–1 | 1–0 | 3–0 | 1–2 | 4–1 | 2–2 | | 2–4 | 1–4 |
| West Bromwich Albion | 3–6 | 2–1 | 5–2 | 1–1 | 2–2 | 0–1 | 3–1 | 3–1 | 3–0 | 2–0 | 3–1 | 4–2 | 2–3 | 2–2 | | 0–0 |
| Wolverhampton Wanderers | 3–0 | 5–1 | 2–1 | 1–0 | 2–1 | 2–4 | 2–0 | 2–0 | 3–1 | 0–0 | 3–4 | 4–2 | 2–1 | 3–1 | 0–8 | |

Legend: Blue = home team win; Yellow = draw; Red = away team win.

=== Maps ===
Locations of the Football League First Division teams

== Second Division ==
Second Division
- Season: 1893–94
- Champions: Liverpool
- Promoted: Liverpool; Small Heath
- Matches: 210
- Goals: 861 (4.1 per match)
- Top goalscorer: Frank Mobley (23 goals)
- Biggest home win: Notts County 9–1 Crewe Alexandra (17 February 1894); Small Heath 10–2 Ardwick (17 March 1894)
- Biggest away win: Northwich Victoria 0–7 Small Heath (6 January 1894)
- Highest scoring: Burton Swifts 8–5 Walsall Town Swifts (24 February 1894)
- Longest winning run: 9 matches Liverpool
- Longest unbeaten run: 28 matches Liverpool
- Longest losing run: 10 matches Northwich Victoria

| Pos | Team | Pld | W | D | L | GF | GA | GAv | Pts | Qualification or relegation |
|---|---|---|---|---|---|---|---|---|---|---|
| 1 | Liverpool (C, O, P) | 28 | 22 | 6 | 0 | 77 | 18 | 4.278 | 50 | Qualification for test matches |
| 2 | Small Heath (O, P) | 28 | 21 | 0 | 7 | 103 | 44 | 2.341 | 42 | Qualification for test matches |
| 3 | Notts County | 28 | 18 | 3 | 7 | 70 | 31 | 2.258 | 39 | Qualification for test matches |
| 4 | Newcastle United | 28 | 15 | 6 | 7 | 66 | 39 | 1.692 | 36 | |
| 5 | Grimsby Town | 28 | 15 | 2 | 11 | 71 | 58 | 1.224 | 32 | |
| 6 | Burton Swifts | 28 | 14 | 3 | 11 | 79 | 61 | 1.295 | 31 | |
| 7 | Burslem Port Vale | 28 | 13 | 4 | 11 | 66 | 64 | 1.031 | 30 | |
| 8 | Lincoln City | 28 | 11 | 6 | 11 | 59 | 58 | 1.017 | 28 | |
| 9 | Woolwich Arsenal | 28 | 12 | 4 | 12 | 52 | 55 | 0.945 | 28 | |
| 10 | Walsall Town Swifts | 28 | 10 | 3 | 15 | 51 | 61 | 0.836 | 23 | |
| 11 | Middlesbrough Ironopolis (Note: Middlesbrough Ironopolis was liquidated at the end of the season.) | 28 | 8 | 4 | 16 | 37 | 72 | 0.514 | 20 | Dissolved |
| 12 | Crewe Alexandra | 28 | 6 | 7 | 15 | 42 | 73 | 0.575 | 19 | |
| 13 | Ardwick | 28 | 8 | 2 | 18 | 47 | 71 | 0.662 | 18 | Re-elected |
| 14 | Rotherham Town | 28 | 6 | 3 | 19 | 44 | 91 | 0.484 | 15 | Re-elected |
| 15 | Northwich Victoria (R) | 28 | 3 | 3 | 22 | 30 | 98 | 0.306 | 9 | Resigned from league |

Rules for classification: 1) Points; 2) Goal average; 3) Goals scored
(C) Champions; (O) Play-off winners; (P) Promoted; (R) Relegated

=== Results ===
| Home \ Away | ARD | BPV | BRS | CRE | GRI | LIN | LIV | MII | NEW | NOR | NTC | ROT | SMH | WAL | WOO |
|---|---|---|---|---|---|---|---|---|---|---|---|---|---|---|---|
| Ardwick | | 8–1 | 1–4 | 1–2 | 4–1 | 0–1 | 0–1 | 6–1 | 2–3 | 4–2 | 0–0 | 3–2 | 0–1 | 3–0 | 0–1 |
| Burslem Port Vale | 4–2 | | 3–1 | 4–2 | 6–1 | 5–3 | 2–2 | 4–0 | 1–1 | 3–2 | 1–0 | 2–3 | 5–0 | 1–2 | 2–1 |
| Burton Swifts | 5–0 | 5–3 | | 6–1 | 0–3 | 1–3 | 1–1 | 7–0 | 3–1 | 6–2 | 0–2 | 4–1 | 0–2 | 8–5 | 6–2 |
| Crewe Alexandra | 1–1 | 1–1 | 1–2 | | 3–3 | 1–1 | 0–5 | 5–0 | 1–1 | 3–0 | 0–2 | 2–0 | 3–5 | 1–1 | 0–0 |
| Grimsby Town | 5–0 | 4–0 | 2–1 | 3–2 | | 2–4 | 0–1 | 2–1 | 0–0 | 7–0 | 5–2 | 7–1 | 2–1 | 5–2 | 3–1 |
| Lincoln City | 6–0 | 2–2 | 1–1 | 6–1 | 1–2 | | 1–1 | 2–3 | 2–1 | 4–1 | 0–2 | 1–1 | 2–5 | 0–2 | 3–0 |
| Liverpool | 3–0 | 2–1 | 3–1 | 2–0 | 2–0 | 4–0 | | 6–0 | 5–1 | 4–0 | 2–1 | 5–1 | 3–1 | 3–0 | 2–0 |
| Middlesbrough Ironopolis | 2–0 | 3–1 | 2–1 | 2–0 | 2–6 | 0–0 | 0–2 | | 1–1 | 2–1 | 0–0 | 6–1 | 3–0 | 1–1 | 3–6 |
| Newcastle United | 2–1 | 2–1 | 4–1 | 2–1 | 4–1 | 5–1 | 0–0 | 7–2 | | 3–0 | 3–0 | 4–0 | 0–2 | 2–0 | 6–0 |
| Northwich Victoria | 1–4 | 1–5 | 1–1 | 1–2 | 0–1 | 0–3 | 2–3 | 2–1 | 5–3 | | 0–1 | 1–1 | 0–7 | 1–0 | 2–2 |
| Notts County | 5–0 | 6–1 | 6–2 | 9–1 | 3–0 | 1–2 | 1–1 | 3–0 | 3–1 | 6–1 | | 4–2 | 3–1 | 2–0 | 3–2 |
| Rotherham Town | 1–3 | 0–1 | 2–5 | 1–4 | 4–3 | 2–8 | 1–4 | 4–1 | 2–1 | 5–4 | 0–2 | | 2–3 | 3–2 | 1–1 |
| Small Heath | 10–2 | 6–0 | 6–1 | 6–1 | 5–2 | 6–0 | 3–4 | 2–1 | 1–4 | 8–0 | 3–0 | 4–3 | | 4–0 | 4–1 |
| Walsall | 5–2 | 0–5 | 3–4 | 5–1 | 5–0 | 5–2 | 1–1 | 1–0 | 1–2 | 3–0 | 2–1 | 3–0 | 1–3 | | 1–2 |
| Woolwich Arsenal | 1–0 | 4–1 | 0–2 | 3–2 | 3–1 | 4–0 | 0–5 | 1–0 | 2–2 | 6–0 | 1–2 | 3–0 | 1–4 | 4–0 | |

Updated to match(es) played on unknown. Source: Ian Laschke: Rothmans Book of Football League Records 1888–89 to 1978–79. Macdonald and Jane’s, London & Sydney, 1980.
Legend: Blue = home team win; Yellow = draw; Red = away team win.

=== Maps ===
Locations of the Football League Second Division teams

== Test matches ==
The Football League test matches were a set of play-offs, in which the bottom First Division teams faced the top Second Division teams. The First Division teams, if coming out as winners, would retain their places in the division. If a Second Division team won, it would be considered for First Division membership through an election process at the expense of a losing First Division team. Losing Second Division teams would stay in the Second Division.

28 April 1894

| Liverpool (2nd Div. Champions) | 2–0 | Newton Heath (1st Div. 16th) |

Ewood Park
Attendance: 5,000
28 April 1894

| Small Heath (2nd Div. 2nd) | 3–1 | Darwen (1st Div. 15th) |

Victoria Ground
Attendance: 3,000
28 April 1894

| Preston North End (1st Div. 14th) | 4–0 | Notts County (2nd Div. 3rd) |

Olive Grove
Attendance: 8,000

=== Consequences ===
Of the winners, Liverpool and Small Heath (later known as Birmingham City F.C.) were elected into the First Division, while Preston North End remained there.

Of the losers Darwen and Newton Heath (later known as Manchester United F.C.) continued in the Second Division, while Notts County remained there.

== Attendances ==
| No. | Club | Average |
|---|---|---|
| 1 | Everton | 13,520 |
| 2 | Aston Villa | 10,665 |
| 3 | Sheffield United | 8,730 |
| 4 | The Wednesday | 8,550 |
| 5 | Newton Heath | 7,280 |
| 6 | Sunderland | 6,890 |
| 7 | Nottingham Forest | 6,775 |
| 8 | Blackburn Rovers | 6,420 |
| 9 | Burnley | 6,300 |
| 10 | Wolverhampton Wanderers | 6,255 |
| 11 | Preston North End | 5,800 |
| 12 | Derby County | 5,640 |
| 13 | Bolton Wanderers | 5,350 |
| 14 | Stoke | 5,075 |
| 15 | West Bromwich Albion | 5,035 |
| 16 | Darwen | 3,700 |

== See also ==
- 1893–94 in English football
- 1893 in association football
- 1894 in association football
