= Karl Flink =

German footballer

Personal information
- Date of birth: 7 December 1895
- Date of death: 28 November 1958 (aged 62)
- Position: Midfielder

Senior career*
Years	Team	Apps	(Gls)
- Kölner BC 01

International career
1922	Germany	1	(0)
- * Club domestic league appearances and goals

Karl Flink (7 December 1895 – 28 November 1958) was a German international footballer.
