= Nybølle =

Nybølle Nybølle
- Village
- Location within Denmark
- Coordinates: 55°42′28.4″N 12°15′59.4″E
- Country: Denmark
- Region: Capital Region of Denmark
- Municipality: Egedal Municipality
- Time zone: UTC+1 (CET)
  - Summer (DST): UTC+2 (CEST)
- Postal code: 2765 Smørum
- Website: www.egedalkommune.dk

Nybølle, is a village in Egedal Municipality. It is located on the northern part of the island of Zealand (Sjælland), in eastern Denmark.
