= Vanessa Gronemann =

Politician from Germany

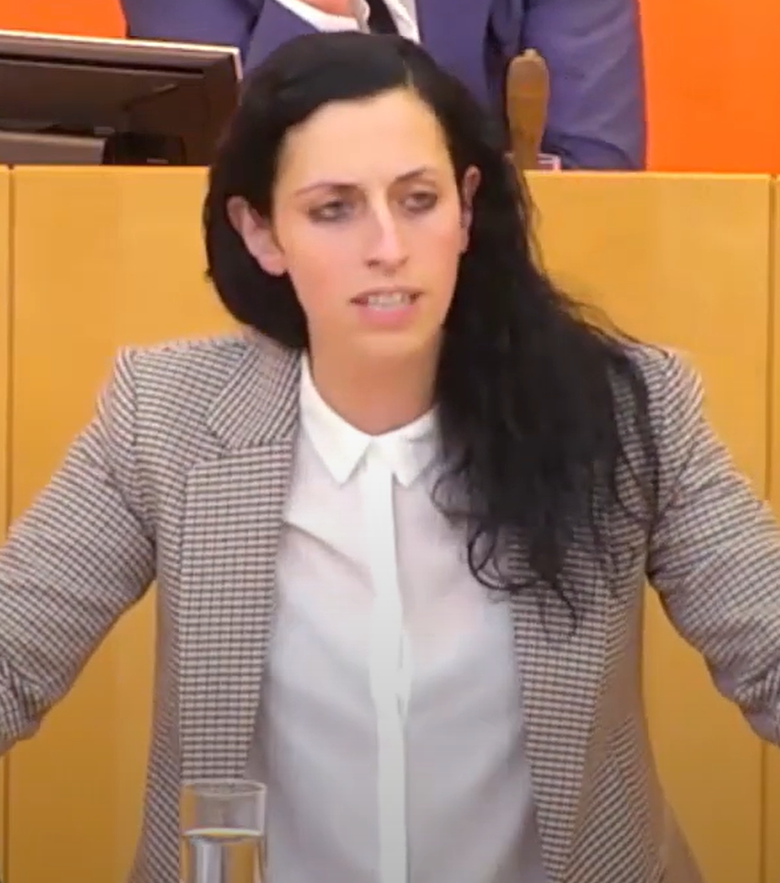
- Gronemann in 2019

Member of the Landtag of Hesse
- Incumbent
- Assumed office January 2019

Personal details
- Born: Vanessa Gronemann; September 7, 1989 (age 36) Hofgeismar, Germany
- Party: Alliance 90/The Greens

Vanessa Gronemann (born 7 September 1989) is a German politician from Alliance 90/The Greens. She has been a member of the Hesse State Parliament since 2019.

== Life ==
In 2013, Gronemann completed an internship with the member of the State Parliament Monne Lentz. She became chairwoman of the Kassel city district association from Green Party in 2015. In 2017, she became a staff member in the constituency office for Bettina Hoffmann, a member of Bundestag. Since 2018, she is the head of the local advisory council in Kassel-Mitte.

She is a member of Alliance 90/The Greens parliamentary group in Kassel City Hall and spokesperson for sports, health, tourism and LGBT. She is also a member of the Cultural Commission of the Kassel City Council.

With 26.7 percent of the constituency votes, Gronemann won the 2018 Hesse state election in the Kassel-City constituency I. In the state parliamentary group of Alliance 90/The Greens, she is responsible for the district of Kassel and spokesperson for the topics of species protection, consumer protection and sports. Gronemann is a lesbian politician.
