= Joseph Hodgson (footballer) =

English footballer

Personal information
- Date of birth: 1894
- Position: Winger

Senior career*
Years	Team	Apps	(Gls)
1912–1914	Rawmarsh Town		
1914	Grimsby Town	1	(0)
- * Club domestic league appearances and goals

Joseph C. Hodgson (1894 – after 1913) was an English professional footballer who played as a winger.
