= St. Nicolai Church, Vejle =

Coordinates: 55°42′26.9″N 9°32′5″E

Saint Nicolai Church
- Sankt Nicolai Kirke
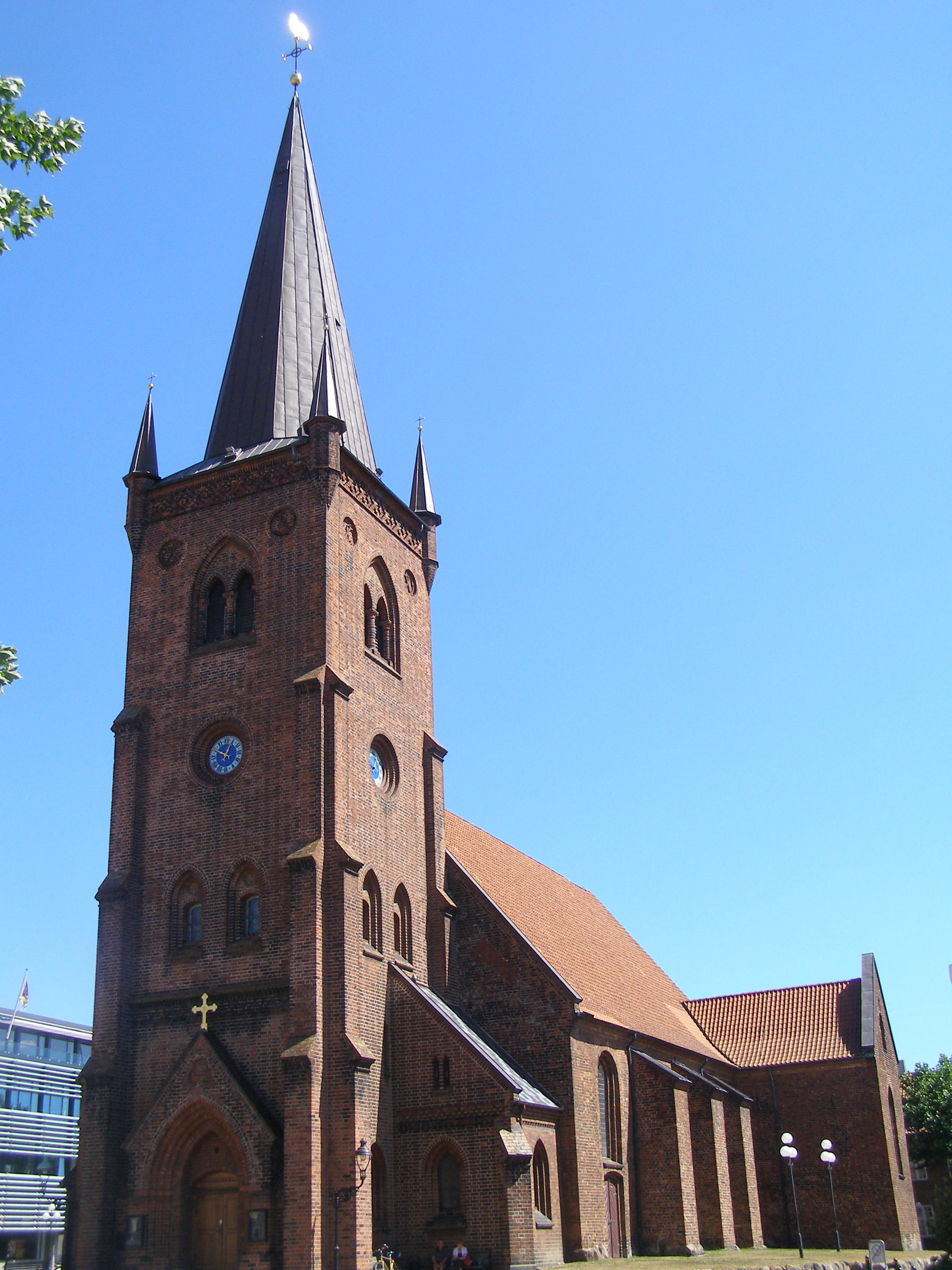
- Saint Nicolai Church
- Country: Denmark
- Denomination: Church of Denmark

History
- Dedication: Saint Nicholas

Architecture
- Architectural type: Romanesque architecture, Gothic architecture
- Completed: 13th century

Administration
- Diocese: Diocese of Haderslev
- Deanery: Vejle Provsti
- Parish: Sankt Nikolaj Sogn

St. Nicolai Church (Danish: Skt. Nicolai Kirke) in Vejle, Denmark is a Lutheran church. The building is dating to the 13th century. Originally built in late Romanesque style and dedicated to the patron saint of merchants and seafarers, the church is the oldest building in the community. Renovations in the 15th century developed the church into a Gothic hall with two transepts and a tower 27.2 m (89 ft) high.

On display in a glass-covered sarcophagus in the northern transept are the remains of the Haraldskær Woman, one of the best conserved of the Iron Age bog bodies. The southern transept houses the sarcophagi of Kai de la Mare and his wife. The exterior brick wall of the north transept has an interesting feature of 23 spherical indentations approximately 15 cm (6 inches) in diameter, which hold the skulls of 23 robbers who were caught and beheaded in the nearby Nørreskov forest. In front of the church stands a sculpture of the priest Anders Sørensen Vedel.

The church was seriously damaged during the Thirty Years' War by the troops of Wallenstein. Since that time it has undergone several major restorations: in 1744, 1855–56, 1887–88 and 1964–66.
