= 1895–96 Football Tournament =

Tournament details
- Country: Denmark
- Teams: 3

Final positions
- Champions: Akademisk Boldklub (2nd title)
- Runner-up: Kjøbenhavns Boldklub

Tournament statistics
- Matches played: 3
- Goals scored: 9 (3 per match)
- Top goal scorer(s): Vilhelm Ellermann (3 goals)

The 1895–96 Football Tournament was the 7th staging of The Football Tournament.

== Overview ==
It was contested by 3 teams, and Akademisk Boldklub won the championship.

== League standings ==
| Pos | Team | Pld | W | L | GF | GA | GR | Pts |
|---|---|---|---|---|---|---|---|---|
| 1 | Akademisk Boldklub | 2 | 2 | 0 | 7 | 0 | — | 4 |
| 2 | Kjøbenhavns Boldklub | 2 | 1 | 1 | 2 | 5 | 0.400 | 2 |
| 3 | Cricketklubben af 1893 | 2 | 0 | 2 | 0 | 4 | 0.000 | 0 |

Source: 1895–96 results
