= 1893–94 Football Tournament =

Tournament details
- Country: Denmark
- Teams: 5

Final positions
- Champions: Akademisk Boldklub (3rd title)
- Runner-up: Kjøbenhavns Boldklub

Tournament statistics
- Matches played: 19
- Goals scored: 129 (6.79 per match)
- Top goal scorer(s): Karl Gadegaard (17 goals)

The 1893–94 Football Tournament was the 5th staging of The Football Tournament. It was contested by 5 teams. In case of a tie, extra-time was played, but unlike the previous seasons in the league, matches that ended in a draw after extra time were not replayed. The match between Akademisk Boldklub and Kjøbenhavns Boldklub in the spring of 1894, which ended in a 3–3 draw after extended playing time, thus became the first draw in the history of the Football Tournament that was not replayed.

Akademisk Boldklub won the championship for the third consecutive season. At the time, winning three consecutive championships entitled the holder to the legitimate property of the cup, thus Boldklub gained the right to keep the trophy.

== League standings ==
Pos	Team	Pld	W	D	L	GF	GA	GR	Pts
1	Akademisk Boldklub	8	7	1	0	53	6	8.833	15
2	Kjøbenhavns Boldklub	8	5	1	2	32	7	4.571	11
3	Boldklubben Frem	8	5	0	3	29	15	1.933	10
4	Fri	8	2	0	6	7	35	0.200	4
5	Arrow	8	0	0	8	6	64	0.094	0

Source: 1893–94 results
