= The Football Tournament =

Defunct Danish football tournament

The Football Tournament (Danish: Fodboldturneringen) was a Danish football tournament staged 14 times in the years 1889–1903. The tournament was played under the auspices of the Danish Football Association, and was contested by the best Danish teams of its time. The winners are not considered official Danish champions.

== Winners ==
Year	Winner	Runners-up	Entrants
1889–90	AB (1)	KB	7
1890–91	KB (1)	AB	7
1891–92	AB / KB / Østerbros Boldklub		5
1892–93	AB (2)	KB	5
1893–94	AB (3)	KB	5
1894–95	AB (4)	KB	3
1895–96	AB (5)	KB	3
1896–97	KB (2)	AB	5
1897–98	KB (3)	AB	6
1898–99	AB (6)	B 93 / Frem / KB	6
1899–1900	AB / B 93		5
1900–01	B 93 (1)	AB / Frem	5
1901–02	Frem (1)	B 93	5
1902–03	KB (4)	Frem	5

== Championships by club ==
Titles	Team
6	AB
4	KB
1	B 93
1	Frem
Note: "Shared" wins not included.

== See also ==
- List of association football competitions
