= 1956–57 Danish 1st Division =

12th season of Danish 1st Division

Danish 1st Division
- Season: 1956–57

The 1956–57 Danish 1st Division season was the 12th edition of Danish 1st Division annual football competition in Denmark. It was contested by 10 teams. The league adopted a calendar year season with a start in March and end in late October/early November; the league played an extra half-season.

Aarhus Gymnastikforening successfully defended its 1956 title by successfully pursuing its 1957 title.

Statistics of Danish 1st Division in the 1956/1957 season.

== League standings ==
Pos	Team	Pld	W	D	L	GF	GA	GD	Pts
1	Aarhus Gymnastikforening	27	17	5	5	55	31	+24	39
2	Akademisk Boldklub	27	16	5	6	68	42	+26	37
3	Boldklubben Frem	27	13	6	8	61	44	+17	32
4	Skovshoved IF	27	13	4	10	51	42	+9	30
5	Kjøbenhavns Boldklub	27	9	9	9	40	48	−8	27
6	Vejle Boldklub	27	9	7	11	49	54	−5	25
7	Esbjerg fB	27	10	5	12	48	53	−5	25
8	Boldklubben 1909	27	8	4	15	40	51	−11	20
9	AIA	27	7	4	16	34	62	−28	18
10	Boldklubben 1903	27	5	7	15	39	58	−19	17

== Results ==
=== Matchday 1–18 ===
Home \ Away	ABK	AGF	AIA	B03	B09	EFB	BKF	KBK	SKO	VBK
Akademisk BK	—	0–1	4–0	1–2	4–2	0–2	4–1	0–0	2–1	4–0
Aarhus GF	2–3	—	0–1	5–2	4–1	2–2	1–1	6–0	3–2	2–0
AI Aarhus	2–3	1–2	—	2–1	0–1	3–0	1–4	5–0	2–3	1–2
B 1903	1–1	1–3	3–0	—	6–0	1–2	2–3	1–1	1–1	2–2
B 1909	0–0	1–0	4–2	6–0	—	2–5	1–3	0–0	0–1	1–1
Esbjerg fB	1–3	1–2	2–4	1–3	1–0	—	2–2	4–1	2–5	1–0
BK Frem	3–1	1–2	0–0	2–1	3–0	3–3	—	1–1	4–1	2–0
Kjøbenhavns BK	4–2	0–0	2–0	2–0	2–0	0–3	1–3	—	1–4	0–0
Skovshoved IF	3–7	2–0	1–1	2–0	2–0	3–1	0–1	2–0	—	3–0
Vejle BK	3–4	1–2	1–1	4–1	5–4	3–1	3–2	3–1	1–1	—

Legend: Blue = home team win; Yellow = draw; Red = away team win.

=== Matchday 19–27 ===
Home \ Away	ABK	AGF	AIA	B03	B09	EFB	BKF	KBK	SKO	VBK
Akademisk BK	—	2–2	—	3–1	—	1–1	—	3–4	—	5–3
Aarhus GF	—	—	1–0	3–1	3–2	—	2–1	—	1–0	—
AI Aarhus	1–6	—	—	—	0–6	3–2	1–3	—	—	—
B 1903	—	—	0–1	—	—	0–2	—	2–2	3–2	—
B 1909	0–1	—	—	3–0	—	—	0–1	—	2–1	1–4
Esbjerg fB	—	0–2	—	—	1–2	—	5–2	—	0–0	—
BK Frem	1–2	—	7–1	3–3	—	—	—	—	—	4–2
Kjøbenhavns BK	—	2–2	—	—	1–1	0–2	3–2	—	5–1	—
Skovshoved IF	1–2	—	4–1	—	—	—	2–1	—	—	3–1
Vejle BK	—	3–2	0–0	1–1	—	6–1	—	0–4	—	—

Legend: Blue = home team win; Yellow = draw; Red = away team win.
