= Esteban Areta =

Spanish footballer

Personal information
- Full name: Esteban Areta Vélez
- Date of birth: 14 April 1932
- Place of birth: Pamplona, Spain
- Date of death: 9 July 2007 (aged 75)
- Place of death: Seville, Spain
- Height: 1.76 m (5 ft 9 1/2 in)
- Position: Defender

Youth career
- Luchana

Senior career*
Years	Team	Apps	(Gls)
1950–1951	Oberena		
1951–1952	Osasuna	25	(11)
1952–1954	Oviedo	58	(23)
1954–1956	Barcelona	21	(9)
1955	→ España Industrial (loan)	3	(3)
1956–1957	Valencia	26	(5)
1957–1964	Betis	131	(23)
1964–1965	Cádiz	24	(5)

International career
1961	Spain	1	(0)

Managerial career
- 1968–1969: Triana
- 1969: Betis
- 1969–1971: Triana
- 1971: Betis
- 1971–1973: Betis (assistant)
- 1973–1980: Betis B
- * Club domestic league appearances and goals

Esteban Areta Vélez (14 April 1932 – 9 July 2007) was a Spanish footballer who played as a defender.

== Honours ==
Barcelona

- Inter-Cities Fairs Cup: 1955–58
