= 1894–95 Football Tournament =

Tournament details
- Country: Denmark
- Teams: 3

Final positions
- Champions: Akademisk Boldklub (2nd title)
- Runner-up: Kjøbenhavns Boldklub

Tournament statistics
- Matches played: 6
- Goals scored: 37 (6.17 per match)
- Top goal scorer(s): Peter Nielsen; Frits Ludvig Lassen (6 goals)

The 1894–95 Football Tournament was the 6th staging of The Football Tournament.

== Overview ==
It was contested by 3 teams, which was the lowest number of participants in the history of the competition thus far, but on the other hand, they managed to complete all the matches for the first time in the history of the competition. Akademisk Boldklub won the championship for the fourth time in a row.

== League standings ==
Pos	Team	Pld	W	L	GF	GA	GR	Pts
1	Akademisk Boldklub	4	4	0	26	3	8.667	8
2	Kjøbenhavns Boldklub	4	2	2	7	12	0.583	4
3	Boldklubben Frem	4	0	4	4	22	0.182	0

Source: 1894–95 results
