= Johannes Gandil =

Danish footballer (1873-1956)

Medal record

Men's football

Representing Denmark

Olympic Games
Silver medal – second place	1908 London	Team

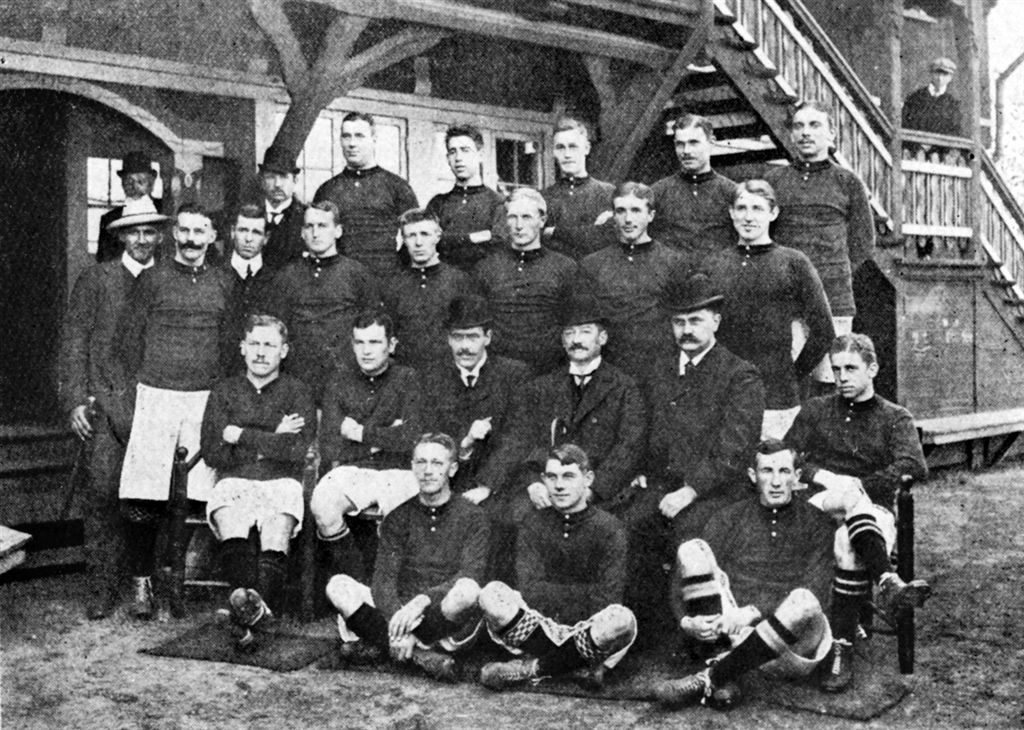

Johannes Gandil (21 May 1873 – 7 March 1956) was a Danish amateur footballer who played one game as a striker for the Denmark national team, winning a silver medal at the 1908 Summer Olympics. He also competed at the 1900 Summer Olympics in Paris, France, as a track and field athlete.

== Early life ==
He was born in Ringe.

== Career ==
During his footballing career, Gandil represented the Copenhagen clubs ØB, KB and B 93, in fact he was the main person to introduce football to B 93 as it was originally at cricket club, he also went on to score 81 goals in 82 games and sat on the board for 49 years.

He played his only Danish national team game in the semi-final of the 1908 Summer Olympics, as Denmark beat France 17–1 on 22 October 1908. The game was the second official game ever recorded by the Danish national team, and Gandil's age of 35 years and 154 days made him the then oldest Danish debutant. Gandil kept the record for almost 93 years, until goalkeeper Peter Kjær made his debut in April 2001, only 17 days older than Gandil had been, but unfortunately for Gandil a knee injury put paid to anymore appearances.

At the 1900 Summer Olympics, Gandil competed in the 100 metres event, but was eliminated in the first round (quarterfinals) after placing third in his heat, he later became the Danish national champion at the 100 metres in 1902.

Gandil was the editor of the 719-page Dansk Fodbold, a tome on Danish football history from the earliest stages to 1939, published at the 50th anniversary of the Danish Football Association.

He died in Ordrup.
