= Édouard Baumann =

French footballer (1895-1985)

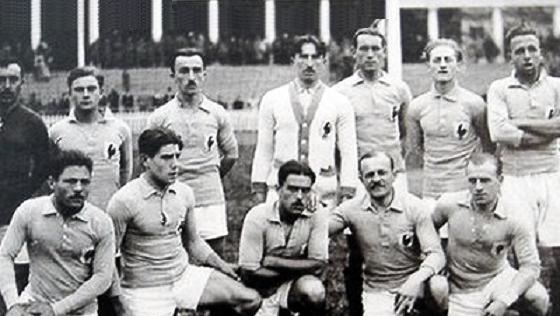
- Baumann (4th standing) and the French team during the 1920 Olympics.

Personal information
- Date of birth: 4 March 1895
- Place of birth: Paris, France
- Date of death: 12 April 1985 (aged 90)
- Place of death: Boulogne-Billancourt, France

International career
Years	Team	Apps	(Gls)
- France

Édouard Baumann (4 March 1895 – 12 April 1985) was a French footballer. He competed at the 1920 Summer Olympics and the 1924 Summer Olympics.
