= Thomas Bell (footballer, born 1884) =

English footballer

Personal information
- Full name: Thomas Dawson Bell
- Date of birth: 3 December 1884
- Place of birth: West Stanley, England
- Date of death: 6 March 1951 (aged 66)
- Position: Inside forward

Senior career*
| Years | Team | Apps | (Gls) |
| 1908–1909 | West Stanley | | |
| 1909–1912 | Grimsby Town | 32 | (9) |
| 1912–1913 | Scunthorpe & Lindsey United | | |
| 1913–191? | Cleethorpes Town | | |
- * Club domestic league appearances and goals

Thomas Dawson Bell (3 December 1884 – 6 March 1951) was an English professional footballer who played as an inside forward.
