= Football League Second Division =

Former English second-tier football league

- Founded: 1892
- Folded: 2004
- Country: England; Wales
- Number of clubs: 24
- Level on pyramid: 2 (1892–1992); 3 (1992–2004)
- Promotion to: First Division (1892–2004)
- Relegation to: Third Division (1920–1921; 1958–2004); North/South (1921–1958)
- International cup: European Cup Winners' Cup (1960–1985; 1990–1999)
- Last champions: Plymouth Argyle (2003–04)
- Most championships: Leicester City (8 titles)

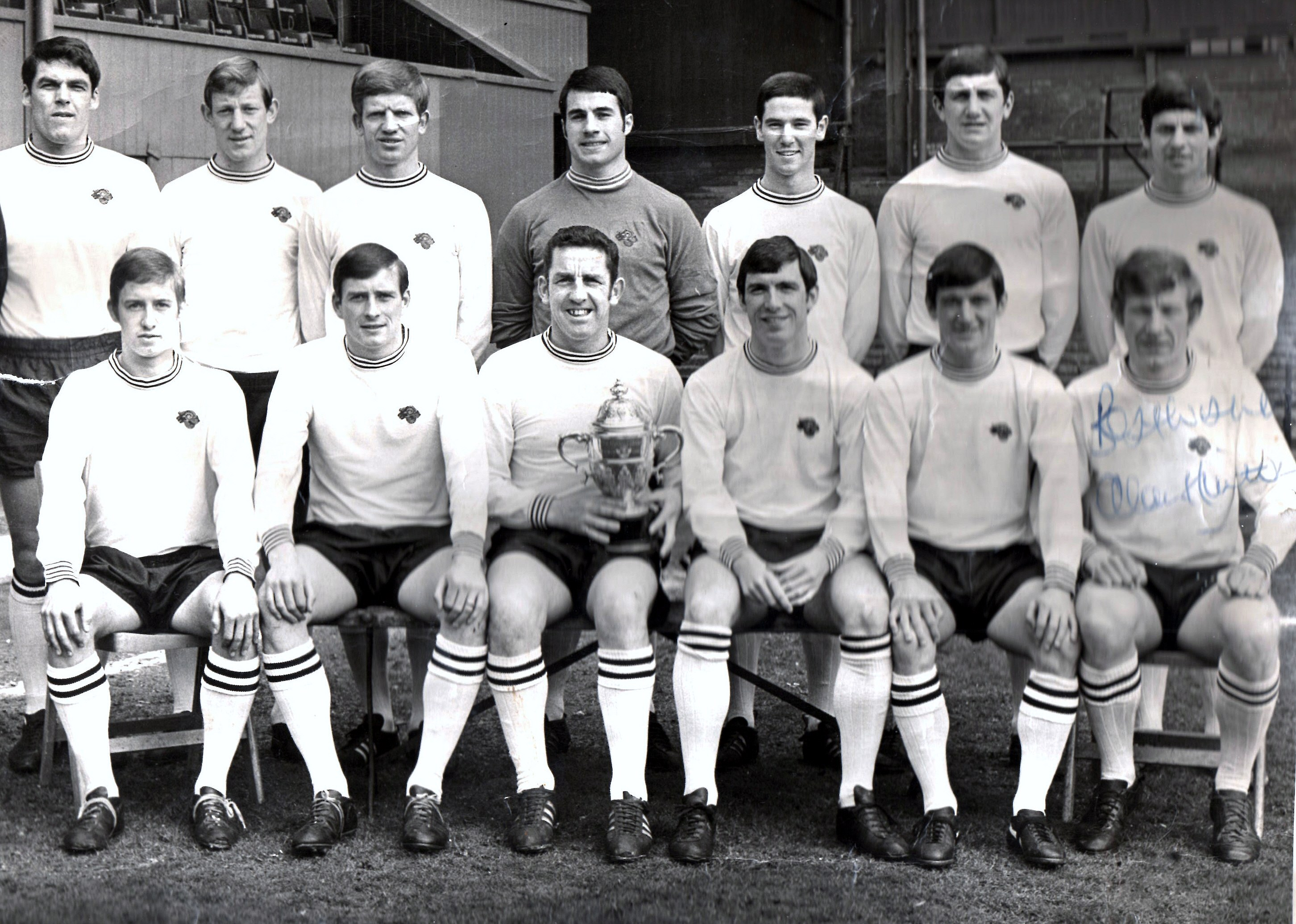
The Derby County team that won the 1968–69 Football League Second Division.

The Football League Second Division was the second level division in the English football league system between 1892 and 1992. Following the foundation of the FA Premier League, the Football League divisions were renumbered and the third tier became known as the Football League Second Division, while the second level was branded "First Division," below the Premiership. After the rebranding of the Football League in 2003–04, the second tier became known as the Championship, and the third tier became known as Football League One.

== Early history ==
In 1888, Scotsman William McGregor a director of Aston Villa, was the main force between meetings held in London and Manchester involving 12 football clubs, with an eye to a league competition. These 12 clubs would later become the Football League's 12 founder members. The meetings were held in London on 22 March 1888. The main concern was that an early exit in the knockout format of the FA Cup could leave clubs with no matches for almost a year; not only could they suffer heavy financial losses, but fans did not wait long without a game, when other teams were playing. Matters were finalised on 17 April in Manchester.

McGregor had voted against the name The Football League, as he was concerned that it would be associated with the Irish Land League. But this name still won by a majority vote and was selected. The competition guaranteed fixtures for all of its member clubs. Geographically, these were split equally between the North and the Midlands.

A rival English league called the Football Alliance operated from 1889 to 1892. In 1892 it was decided to formally merge the two leagues, and so the Football League Second Division was formed, consisting mostly of Football Alliance clubs. The existing League clubs, plus three of the strongest Alliance clubs, comprised the Football League First Division.

== Overview ==
The Second Division was formed in 1892 with 12 clubs, most of which had previously played in the Football Alliance. The original members were: Ardwick (now Manchester City), Bootle, Burton Swifts, Crewe Alexandra, Darwen, Grimsby Town, Lincoln City, Northwich Victoria, Port Vale, Sheffield United, Small Heath (now Birmingham City), and Walsall. Leicester City and Manchester City both hold the record for most second tier championships (8).

It expanded over the years to its final total of 24 clubs, as follows:

- 1893 – 15 clubs
- 1894 – 16
- 1898 – 18
- 1905 – 20
- 1919 – 22
- 1987 – 23
- 1988 – 24

For the first few years, there was no automatic promotion to the First Division. Instead, the top few teams in Division Two, including the winners, contested a series of test matches against the bottom teams in Division One. Small Heath, Second Division champions in 1892–93, were denied promotion after losing in test matches to Newton Heath. However, runners-up Sheffield United beat Accrington to become the first team to win promotion to the First Division. Test matches were abolished in 1898 after Burnley and Stoke conspired to deliberately draw their test match 0–0, which resulted in Burnley being promoted and Stoke being saved from relegation.

Relegation to the Football League Third Division was in place in the season before the latter even started, as Grimsby Town (last place in 1919–20) made way for Cardiff City and formed the new Third Division with southern clubs. For subsequent seasons, two clubs were relegated into either the Third Division North or Third Division South depending on their geographical location. When the Third Division was reunified in 1958–59, the relegation arrangement was kept; a third club began being relegated in 1974.

== Previous League champions ==
See List of teams promoted from the English Football League Championship and predecessors for winners from 1893 to 1992 and List of winners of English Football League One and predecessors for winners from 1993 to 2004.

Sporting positions
| Preceded by Football Alliance | Second tier of English football 1892–1992 | Succeeded by Football League First Division |
| Preceded by Football League Third Division | Third tier of English football 1992–2004 | Succeeded by Football League One |
