= George Lees (footballer) =

English footballer (1924–1988)

Personal information
- Full name: George Charles Lees
- Date of birth: 25 June 1924
- Place of birth: Wellington, Shropshire, England
- Date of death: 23 February 1988 (aged 63)
- Position: Defender

Senior career*
Years	Team	Apps	(Gls)
1951–1960	Boldklubben Frem	163	(2)
- * Club domestic league appearances and goals

George Charles Lees (25 June 1924 – 23 February 1988) was an English amateur football defender who played for the Danish side Boldklubben Frem for nine years, making 163 first-team appearances, scoring two goals. In 1956 Lees became the first ever foreign player to play in a Danish cup final.

In his civil life Lees was employed in printing.
