= Østerbros Boldklub =

Danish sports club

ØB
- Full name: Østerbros Boldklub
- Short name: ØB
- Ground: Fælledparken

Østerbros Boldklub (also known as ØB) was a Danish sports club based in the Østerbro area of Copenhagen, active from 1894 to 1998. The club is best known for its amateur football team. It was one of the oldest Danish football clubs, and played 10 seasons in the top-flight Danish football championship from 1928 to 1950. ØB was a founding member of the Sports Confederation of Denmark (1896) and the Copenhagen Football Association (1903). The football club predominantly played its games at the Fælledparken, a common shared by the smaller Copenhagen clubs.

== History ==
ØB was founded as a cricket and association football club in 1894, with the aim of spreading the knowledge and skill in the two sports. It took the name Østerbros Boldklub from an earlier, then defunct team of 1887, whose members had dissolved that club to form Boldklubben af 1893. The cricket team was initially successful, but was dropped as a club activity by 1920.

ØB's football team competed in The Football Tournament, a championship for Copenhagen teams, from 1896. ØB's best placing was third place in its debut 1896–97 Football Tournament season. ØB then competed in the Copenhagen Football Association's newly inducted Copenhagen football championship from 1903 to 1906. ØB was the smallest of the big five Copenhagen clubs, often losing their best players, such as later international Carl "Skoma'r" Hansen, to their rivals. Due to its consecutive poor performances in the Copenhagen championship, ØB was relegated to a newly created second-tier tournament, which the club duly won in 1908. ØB was reinstated in the Copenhagen championship the following year, but in 1911 the club faced relegation once again. The four biggest teams decided to quit the Copenhagen Football Association, allowing ØB to stay in the competition, winning their only top-flight title in the 1911 Copenhagen Football Championship. When the big-four clubs rejoined the Copenhagen championship, ØB was promptly demoted once more. ØB won the second-tier tournament a number of times, but failed to make a lasting impression in the Copenhagen championship. Its greatest results were reaching the final of the Copenhagen Cup in 1917 and 1922, though losing on both occasions.

In 1928, ØB finished 2nd in the second-tier Copenhagen tournament, and qualified for the second season of the nationwide top-flight 1928–29 Denmark Tournament. However, the club was summarily eliminated following four defeats in four games. ØB found itself surpassed not only by the big four, who had built their own stadiums and earned entrance fees, but also B 1903. These clubs also arranged lucrative exhibition games through the Stævnet association. ØB sought to strengthen the position and economy of the smaller Copenhagen clubs excluded from Stævnet, and was a co-founder of competing associations in the early 1920s, 1936, and 1940 (Alliancen). Most important for ØB, the club engaged Carl "Skoma'r" Hansen as coach in 1933, while an arrangement was made in 1936 for the Royal Orphanage to function as the youth team of the club.

ØB finally broke through on the national stage in 1938. ØB had once again won the second-tier Copenhagen tournament in 1937, which granted access to the Danish 3rd Division mini-tournament. ØB won the 1937–38 3rd Division, following an aggregate 9–4 win in the finals against Vejle Boldklub, and was promoted to the nationwide Danish 2nd Division. This ended ØB's long spell in the Copenhagen second-tier, as the 2nd Division took precedence as the highest-ranking full-season tournament for which the club was eligible. During the German occupation of Denmark from 1940 to 1945, ØB became part of the top-flight War Tournaments, reaching the quarterfinals on two occasions. Following the end of the war, ØB was returned to the 2nd Division, which the club promptly won in 1946. ØB thus gained promotion for the top-flight Danish 1st Division. ØB's greatest success was finishing fourth place in its debut 1946–47 Danish 1st Division season. Carl Aage Præst, from the Royal Orphanage, and Helge Bronée were the best players of the team, with Bronée the top goal scorer of the tournament. In 1947, ØB won the Copenhagen Cup, defeating B 1903 in the final with Bronée the best player.

In the hope of economic gain and a long-term position among the great Copenhagen clubs, ØB decided to switch allegiance and join Stævnet in 1949. It didn't go according to plan. Carl Aage Præst and Helge Bronee both left the club to sign professional contracts with foreign cubs, and ØB struggled without them. In 1950, ØB finished in last place of the 1st Division, and were relegated to the 2nd Division. The club slid further down to the 3rd Division in 1951, and into the lower leagues in 1953. ØB gave up its membership of Stævnet in 1953, but did not rekindle its work with the competing associations until the mid-1960s. The club found itself competing in the fourth-tier Copenhagen Series or lower, and never rejoined the upper divisions of Danish football. In 1998, ØB merged with Ryvang Fodbold Club to form Østerbros Idræts-Forening.

== International players ==
- Poul Nielsen (1920)
- Carl Aage Præst (1945)
- Helge Bronée (1945)

== Honours ==
- Copenhagen second-tier: 1907–08, 1912, 1912–13, 1917–18, 1923–24, 1932–33, 1936–37, 1937–38
- Copenhagen football champions: 1911
- Danish 3rd Division: 1937–38
- Danish 2nd Division: 1945–46
- Copenhagen Cup: 1947
