= Boldklubben Frem =

Danish association football club

Frem
- Full name: Boldklubben Frem af 1886
- Nickname: Fremmerne
- Short name: Frem
- Founded: 17 July 1886; 140 years ago as Fremskridtsklubbens Cricketklub
- Ground: Valby Idrætspark
- Capacity: 12,000 (4,400 seats)
- Chairman: Jon Herstad
- Head coach: Patrick Birch Braune
- League: 3rd Division
- 2025–26: 3rd Division, 9th of 12
- Website: bkfrem.dk
| Home colours | Away colours | Third colours |

Boldklubben Frem (also known as Frem, BK Frem or BK Frem Copenhagen) is a Danish sports club based in the Valby-Sydhavnen area of Copenhagen. It is best known for its semi-professional football team and its youth academy. Since its foundation in 1886, Frem has won the Danish Championships six times and the Danish Cup twice. Until bankruptcy in 1993, Frem had played in the top division in all but six seasons. After the bankruptcy the club fought its way back to the top of Danish football, but in 2010 it went bankrupt again and was demoted to the Copenhagen Series—the fifth tier in the Danish league system. After two consecutive promotions, the club now participates in the Danish 3rd Division, the fourth tier.

The club also has a youth and amateur football branch, as well as a cricket team. It is also involved in the running of the KIES sports boarding school.

== History ==
=== Early years ===
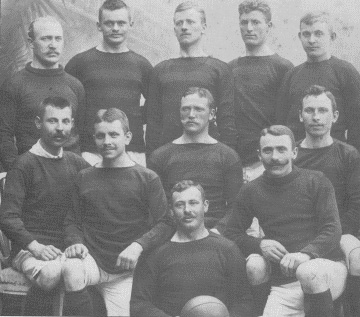
Frem's squad of the 1901–1902 Copenhagen Championship-winning season. The player at the very centre is Axel Byrval.

BK Frem were founded as Fremskridtsklubbens Cricketklub on 17 July 1886 by a group of seditious young men from the then government hostile Venstre Reform Party, as a cloak for political activities. In 1887 football was introduced and the name was changed to Boldklubben Frem, stiftet af Fremskridtsklubben (lit. Danish: The Ball Club Forward, founded by the Progress Club).

In the first two years of the life of the club, only two sports matches were played, but when the Danish Football Association introduced a football tournament in 1889, the club was invited to participate, and in 1890 Frem became the first Danish club to beat KB in a football match. In 1902 Frem became unofficial Danish champions when they won the league played under the auspices of the Danish FA. This was the first ever senior title won by the club.

In 1905, the club moved to its own field at Enghavevej, Vesterbro, obtaining its distinct working class profile. To this day, both the Social Democrats and the Union of Metalworkers holds Frem sponsorships. In 1912, Frem joined the representative team Stævnet which arranged lucrative exhibition matches and played a decisive role in Danish football politics.

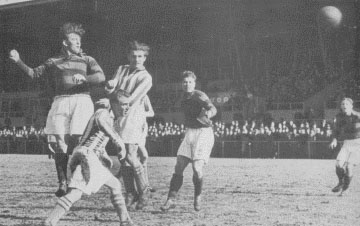
Match against AB around 1940. Frem players (hooped shirts): Pauli Jørgensen (far left), Johannes Pløger (2nd from right) and Erling Sørensen (far right).

=== Palmy days ===
In the years 1923–1944, Frem won six Danish Championships.

=== Division Yo-Yoing ===
Since 1983 Frem had been battling economically, and in 1993 saw themselves demoted to the Danmarksserien following a bankruptcy, which was due to a debt of DKK 8,500,000 and allegations of fraud.

Following a short but expensive spell in the Superliga in 2003–2004, Frem were once again on the verge of bankruptcy with a debt of DKK 10,000,000.

In 2010, after years of uncertain economy, the club once again went bankrupt and was demoted to the Copenhagen Series.

== Supporters ==
Frem's official supportergroup is called "BK Frem Support". It is Denmark's oldest supporters club, formed in 1986. Frem fans are especially known for unconditional love and support. Even when demoted to the fifth tier, attendances almost didn't drop.

== Home ground ==
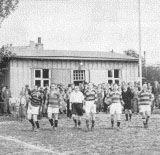
The clubhouse at Enghavevej, Vesterbro used 1905–1942.

Frem play their home matches at the modest and somewhat worn-down, municipality-owned Valby Idrætspark.

In the early years, Frem were located on Østerbro in Copenhagen, playing its matches at Blegdamsfælleden, alongside its main rivals in the early years; AB and KB. In 1905 Frem moved to its own field at Enghavevej, Vesterbro. Being a field-owning club gave Frem the advantage of entry fees. Its location however lead to some muttering from football fans who found it to be too far out of town.

In 1942, Frem moved to Valby Idrætspark, where the current main stand was erected in 1965. Throughout the years many matches had been played at Idrætsparken. It is unclear when this tradition was discontinued.

During the 2000s, there were several plans for a new stadium, but they were never realized.

In 2006 the Copenhagen Municipality predicted that the main stand of the current Valby Idrætspark would last another 5–10 years.
As of April 2007 major investments in the current stadium are put on hold as a decision on the construction of a new stadium is being awaited. A final decision is expected was April 2008.

Hans Hermansen, then managing director of BK Frem, has indicated that according to the plan, the construction of a new stadium should commence no later than 2010. However, the municipality estimated 2012. Frem suggested that it might be completed by 2016.

In January 2016 the municipality ordered a renovation of the existing stadium, worth 3 mio €, thus cancelling plans for a new stadium in the near future. The renovation is due ultimo 2017.

== Sponsorships ==
After Frem's bankruptcy in summer 2010, the club were helped by Danish brewery giant Carlsberg. Being from the same city they signed on as a main sponsor, because they saw it as a chance to help the fellow Valby-based brand recover. In July 2013 an extension for three years was announced. On 11 June 2016 it was extended for another three years.

In June 2015 Frem announced they would switch back from Diadora to their old shirt partner, Hummel, starting from the 2015–2016 season.

=== Kit manufacturers and shirt sponsors ===
| Period | Kit manufacturer | Shirt sponsor |
|---|---|---|
| 1976–1977 | Adidas | GaJol |
| 1978 | Hummel | Lee Cooper |
| 1979 | Hummel | Individual |
| 1980–1983 | Hummel | Mamiya Camera |
| 1984 | Hummel | SJL Banken |
| 1985–1986 | Hummel | Bilka |
| 1987 | Nike | Nordania |
| 1988–1989 | Adidas | Nordania |
| 1990 | Adidas | KTAS |
| 1990-1991 | Adidas | Zürich Forsikring |
| 1992–1994 | Adidas | Alka |
| 1995–1998 | Beltona | Støvsuger Banden |
| 1998–2002 | Hummel | Støvsuger Banden |
| 2002 | Hummel | 3H Udlejning |
| 2003–2005 | Hummel | Altima |
| 2005–2007 | Hummel | Ramirent |
| 2007–2010 | Hummel | GB |
| 2010–2013 | Hummel | Carlsberg |
| 2013–2015 | Diadora | Carlsberg |
| 2015–2020 | Hummel | Carlsberg |
| 2015– | Craft | Carlsberg |

== Honours ==
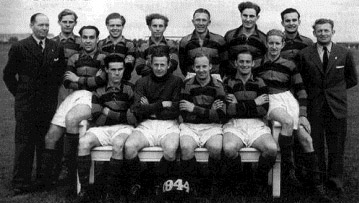
Frem's squad of the 1943–1944 championship-winning season.

- Danish Champions
  - Winners (6): 1922–23, 1930–31, 1932–33, 1935–36, 1940–41, 1943–44
  - Runner-up (9): 1929–30, 1934–35, 1936–37, 1937–38, 1947–48, 1958, 1966, 1967, 1976
  - 3rd placed (6): 1933–34, 1954–55, 1956–57, 1968, 1971, 1991–92
- Danish Cup
  - Winners (2): 1955–56, 1977–78
  - Runner-up (3): 1968–69, 1970–71, 1980–81
- Unofficial Danish Champions
  - Winners (1): 1901–02
  - Runner-up (3): 1898–99, 1900–01, 1902–03
- Copenhagen Champions
  - Winners (3): 1903–04, 1923, 1933
  - Runner-up (8): 1906, 1908, 1910, 1911, 1918, 1922, 1929, 1937
- KBUs Pokalturnering
  - Winners (6): 1925, 1927, 1938, 1940, 1943, 1946
  - Runner-up (9): 1913, 1918, 1919, 1922, 1924, 1930, 1934, 1939, 1944
- Baneklubberne Cup
  - Winners (1): 1911
- UEFA Intertoto Cup
  - Winners (2): 1969, 1977

== Current squad ==
As of 23 September 2026

Note: Flags indicate national team as defined under FIFA eligibility rules; some limited exceptions apply. Players may hold more than one non-FIFA nationality.

| No. | Pos. | Nation | Player |
|---|---|---|---|
| 1 | GK | DEN | Emil Lollike |
| 2 | DF | DEN | Christoffer Remmer |
| 3 | DF | DEN | Emil Schou Jørgensen |
| 4 | DF | DEN | Thor Høholt |
| 5 | DF | DEN | Gustav Hansen |
| 6 | MF | DEN | Daniel Warmbach |
| 7 | FW | DEN | Javany Lawrence |
| 8 | MF | DEN | Rasmus Blæsild |
| 9 | FW | DEN | Amim Amhamdi |
| 10 | FW | DEN | Emil Wass |
| 11 | FW | DEN | Oussama Djafer-Bey |
| 12 | FW | DEN | Yasin El Halimi |
| 13 | DF | DEN | Viggo Blicker |
| 14 | MF | DEN | Noah Maale |

| No. | Pos. | Nation | Player |
|---|---|---|---|
| 15 | MF | DEN | Jonathan Pank |
| 16 | FW | DEN | Noah Kretzschmar (on loan from Hillerød) |
| 17 | FW | DEN | Malthe Karsberg |
| 18 | FW | DEN | Niclas Coort |
| 19 | FW | MNE | Kristian Jašović |
| 20 | FW | IRQ | Ali Almosawe |
| 21 | DF | DEN | Noah Danboe Poulsen |
| 22 | MF | DEN | Casper Froulund |
| 23 | DF | DEN | Christian Espenhain |
| 24 | DF | HAI | Jeppe Simonsen |
| 27 | GK | DEN | Tobias Søderstrøm |
| 28 | FW | DEN | Tekin Abdulovski |
| 30 | GK | DEN | Mikkel Wagner |

== Club officials ==
As of 26 January 2026

Chairman: Jon Herstad
Head Coach: Marc Thevis
Assistant Coach: Andreas Hermansen
Goalkeeping Coach: Kasper Juhl Jensen
Fitness Coach: Mark Olsson
Equipment Manager : Sven Kurzweg
U19 Team Coach: Jamaa Aboualou
U17 Team Coach: Anders Broløs
U16 Team Coach: Bülent Ergüc
U15 Team Coach: Jamal Aztout
U14 Team Coach: Dzevdet Sainoski
U13 Team Coach: Ali Mahmoud
U12 Team Coach: Mickey Spens
U11 Team Coach: Martin Gammelgaard

=== Head coach history ===
| Name | Nationality | From | To | Honours | Comments | Refs |
| Patrick Birch Braune | Denmark | 29 June 2026 | current | | | |
| Marc Thevis | Denmark | 26 January 2026 | 1 June 2026 | | | |
| Daniel "Elly" Pedersen | Denmark | 17 January 2025 | 17 January 2026 | | | |
| Henrik Gundersen | Denmark | 17 June 2023 | 19 November 2024 | | | |
| Christoffer Sick Balle | Denmark | 2 December 2022 | 6 June 2023 | | | |
| René Henriksen | Denmark | 27 January 2020 | 21 November 2022 | | | |
| Allan Ravn | Denmark | 20 June 2019 | 27 January 2020 | | | |
| Lasse Holmgaard | Denmark | 1 July 2018 | 13 May 2019 | | | |
| Martin E. Jensen | Denmark | 14 August 2017 | 30 June 2018 | | Caretaker | |
| Danny Jung | Denmark | 1 January 2017 | 14 August 2017 | | | |
| René Henriksen and Michael Mio Nielsen | Denmark | 10 October 2016 | 31 December 2016 | | Caretakers | |
| Henrik Gundersen | Denmark | 29 April 2014 | 10 October 2016 | | Originally had contract until end of 2017 | |
| Henrik Jensen | Denmark | 1 July 2012 | 29 April 2014 | | Originally had contract until summer 2014 | |
| John 'Tune' Kristiansen | Denmark | 18 June 2012 | 23 June 2012 | | Caretaker for one league match | |
| Peer F. Hansen | Denmark | 1 January 2012 | 18 June 2012 | Promoted to the third tier | | |
| John 'Tune' Kristiansen | Denmark | 27 July 2010 | 30 December 2011 | Promoted to the fourth tier | Originally had contract until summer 2012 | |
| René Heitmann | Denmark | 17 July 2010 | 27 July 2010 | | Never coached the team in a match | |
| Christian Andersen | Denmark | 11 July 2009 | 19 June 2010 | Relegated to the third tier | Club went bankrupt after the season | |
| Anders Theil | Denmark | 7 November 2005 | 7 July 2009 | | Originally had contract until summer 2011 | |
| Ebbe Skovdahl | Denmark | 11 October 2003 | 6 November 2005 | Relegated to the second tier | Originally had contract until summer 2007 | |
| Ole Mørk | Denmark | 15 October 2001 | 10 October 2003 | Promoted to the first tier | Originally had contract until end of 2004 | |
| Johnny Petersen | Denmark | 5 May 1998 | 14 October 2001 | | Originally had contract until end of 2001 | |
| John 'Tune' Kristiansen | Denmark | 1996 | 4 May 1998 | Promoted to the second tier | | |

== Season-by-season results ==
=== Recent years ===
| Season | Pos | Pts | Pld | W | D | L | GF | GA | GD |
|---|---|---|---|---|---|---|---|---|---|
| 15-16: 2nd Division Promotion Group | #4/12 | 34 | 16 | 7 | 2 | 7 | 27 | 22 | +5 |
| 14-15: 2nd Division East | #2/16 | 61 | 30 | 18 | 7 | 5 | 56 | 27 | +29 |
| 13-14: 2nd Division East | #8/16 | 38 | 30 | 9 | 11 | 10 | 46 | 44 | +2 |
| 12-13: 2nd Division East | #7/16 | 48 | 30 | 14 | 6 | 10 | 45 | 40 | +5 |
| 11–12: Denmark Series Pool 1 | #1/14 | 51 | 26 | 15 | 6 | 5 | 54 | 29 | +25 |
| 10–11: Copenhagen Series | #1/14 | 67 | 26 | 21 | 4 | 1 | 92 | 18 | +74 |
| 09-10: 1st Division | #15/16 | 28 | 30 | 7 | 7 | 16 | 38 | 59 | −21 |
| 08-09: 1st Division | #11/16 | 36 | 30 | 8 | 12 | 10 | 41 | 53 | −12 |
| 07-08: 1st Division | #11/16 | 33 | 30 | 12 | 3 | 15 | 46 | 54 | −8 |
| 06-07: 1st Division | #5/16 | 50 | 30 | 14 | 8 | 8 | 48 | 43 | +5 |
| 05-06: 1st Division | #10/16 | 40 | 30 | 11 | 7 | 12 | 47 | 42 | +5 |
| 04-05: 1st Division | #3/16 | 59 | 30 | 17 | 8 | 5 | 61 | 30 | +31 |
| 03-04: Superliga | #11/12 | 27 | 33 | 8 | 3 | 22 | 40 | 65 | −25 |
| 02-03: 1st Division | #2/16 | 58 | 30 | 18 | 4 | 8 | 64 | 43 | +21 |

=== League status ===
==== Post 1993 bankruptcy and demotion ====
Green denotes the highest level of football in Denmark; yellow the second-highest; red the third-highest; black the fourth-highest; grey the fifth-highest.

==== All time ====
Green denotes the highest level of football in Denmark; yellow the second-highest; red the third-highest; black the fourth-highest; grey the fifth-highest.

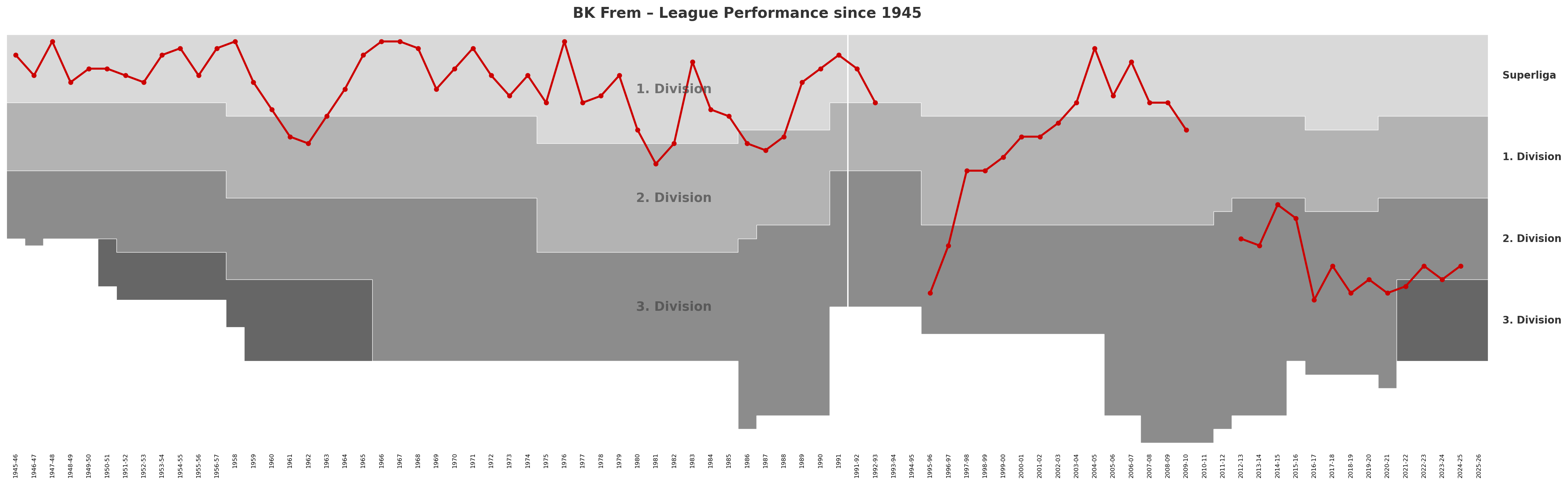
BK Frems league position since 1945

== European competitions record ==
| Season | Competition | Round | | Club | Home | Away | Aggregate |
|---|---|---|---|---|---|---|---|
| 1967–68 | Inter-Cities Fairs Cup | 1R | (Spain) | Athletic Bilbao | 0–1 | 2–3 | 2–4 |
| 1969–70 | UEFA Cup Winners' Cup | 1R | (Switzerland) | FC St. Gallen | 2–1 | 0–1 | 2–2 |
| 1972–73 | UEFA Cup | 1R | (France) | FC Sochaux | 2–1 | 3–1 | 5–2 |
| 1972–73 | UEFA Cup | 2R | (Netherlands) | FC Twente | 0–5 | 0–4 | 0–9 |
| 1977–78 | UEFA Cup | 1R | (Switzerland) | Grasshoppers | 0–2 | 1–6 | 1–8 |
| 1978–79 | UEFA Cup Winners' Cup | 1R | (France) | AS Nancy-Lorraine | 2–0 | 0–4 | 2–4 |
| 1992–93 | UEFA Cup | 1R | (Switzerland) | Neuchâtel Xamax | 4–1 | 2–2 | 6–3 |
| 1992–93 | UEFA Cup | 2R | (Spain) | Real Zaragoza | 0–1 | 1–5 | 1–6 |

== Cricket ==
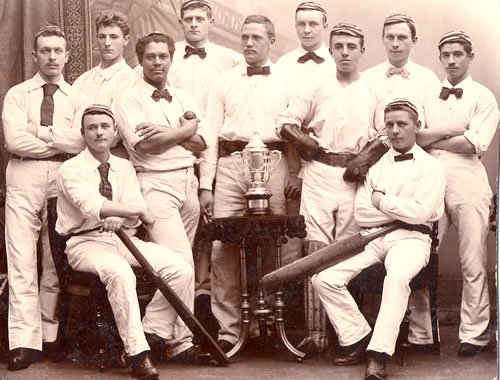
Cricket squad, 1898.

=== Club ===
The Cricket branch is one of the oldest in Denmark.
It is still active and at the moment have a team in the 2nd-best tier.

=== Officials ===
Chairman: Kingsley Peiris

=== Honors ===
- Copenhagen Champions
  - Winners (2): 1894, 1898

.
