= 1964 Danish 1st Division =

19th season of Danish 1st Division

Danish 1st Division
- Season: 1964
- Dates: 26 March – 15 November 1964
- Champions: B 1909 (2nd title)
- Relegated: Akademisk BK; Brønshøj BK
- Matches: 132
- Goals: 484 (3.67 per match)
- Top goalscorer: Jørgen Ravn (21 goals)
- Biggest home win: Aarhus GF 7–1 Brønshøj BK (7 June 1964)
- Biggest away win: Brønshøj BK 0–6 Akademisk BK (18 October 1964)
- Highest scoring: B 1909 6–2 Kjøbenhavns BK (5 April 1964); Aarhus GF 7–1 Brønshøj BK (7 June 1964); Kjøbenhavns BK 5–3 B 1901 (4 October 1964)
- Highest attendance: 43,400; Kjøbenhavns BK 0–1 B 1909 (15 November 1964)
- Total attendance: 554,691
- Average attendance: 4,202

The 1964 Danish 1st Division (Danish: Danmarksturneringens 1. division 1964) was the 37th season of Denmark's top-flight association football division since the establishment of Danmarksturneringen's nation-wide league structure in 1927, and the 51st edition of the overall Danish national football championship since its inception in 1912. Governed by the Danish FA, the season was launched on 26 March 1964 with a clash between last season's third-placed B 1903 and Østerbro-based and local rivals B.93 with the last round of six matches concluding on 15 November 1964. Esbjerg fB were the defending league champions, having won their third consecutive league title last season, while BK Frem and B.93 entered as promoted teams from the 1963 Danish 2nd Division. Fixtures for the 1964 season were announced by the Danish FA's tournament committee on 6 January 1964, featuring a nine weeks long summer break.

The club leading the league table after the spring season's first eleven matches were awarded a berth to the 1964–65 European Cup preliminary round, while the winners of the 1963–64 Danish Cup would quality for the first round of the 1964–65 European Cup Winners' Cup — in case, it turned out to be the same team, the runners-up of the 1964 Danish Cup Final would instead quality for the European Cup Winners' Cup tournament. The overall league winners of 1964 qualified for the 1965–66 European Cup preliminary round. The Danish representatives in the 1964–65 Inter-Cities Fairs Cup first round became B 1913 (on behalf of Odense-Stævnet) and Kjøbenhavns BK (on behalf of Stævnet).

B 1909 won the league, secured their second Danish league championship on the final matchday in front of a record high attendance of 43,400 spectators at Københavns Idrætspark, the highest at a Danish league match in history, with Aarhus GF becoming the runners-up for the fourth time in the history. At the end of the season, the two clubs with the fewest points in the final league standings, Akademisk BK and Brønshøj BK, were relegated to the 1965 Danish 2nd Division. Jørgen Ravn of Kjøbenhavns BK was the league's top scorer for the second time, scoring 21 goals, three more than second-placed teammate Finn Møller.

== Summary ==
External image
- The players of B 1909 at the award ceremony, crowned 1964 Danish league champions, following the away match against Kjøbenhavns BK on 15 November 1964. Bruno Eliasen is holding the league trophy.

The 1964 top-flight league was inaugurated early with a single Thursday match between B 1903, that had finished the 1963 season in third place, and newly promoted B.93 at Gentofte Stadium on 26 March 1964 in front of an audience of 3,100 spectators. B.93's Svend Petersen scored the season's first goal after 8 minutes of play via a header, following a pass from forward Walther Jensen and left wing Tom Søndergaard, but B 1903's knee-injured defender Henning Westergaard managed to draw the match 1–1 by netting in the second goal of the game in the 89th minute after B.93's goalkeeper Bent Jørgensen had lost the ball.

B 1909 claimed the league title on the final matchday, 15 November, with a 1–0 away win at Københavns Idrætspark in a top flight clash against another title contender Kjøbenhavns BK. The weather on that Sunday was cold, windy and raining, but the deciding match of season managed to attract a crowd of 43,400 spectators — it remains the official standing record attendance for a Danish league game. Before the last round, both teams were leading the league table, each with 29 points, followed by Aarhus GF in third place with 27 points — B 1909 held a slightly better goal average. The interest for the game was fueled by the fact that the past ten top-tier league seasons had been won by provincial teams, and that the game involved a Copenhagen-based team, which could reclaim the Danish league title — the first 41 editions of Danish national football championship had been won by a club from the capital. Despite the stadium being able to hold approximately 50,000 spectators at the time and no brewing unrest, the authorities decided the close the gates 15 minutes before kick-off due to fears of overcrowding. A good portion of non-payers had more or less illegally obtained a spot at the stands inside the stadium, while several thousand people outside the stadium could not get access.

The final match was won by B 1909 with a single goal netted by forward Mogens Haastrup in the 80th minute of play, following a pass from teammate John Danielsen, where Haastrup dribbled and eluded Kjøbenhavns BK goalkeeper Nils Jensen. B 1909 goalkeeper Svend Aage Rask, dressed in complete black, prevented several goal attempt from Kjøbenhavns BK's forwards, including Jørgen Ravn. Hungarian-Swiss Carlos Pintér was head coach for the Odense-based working class team in corporation with a match selection committee and had the following core players in the club's squad: goalkeeper Svend Aage Rask, defenders Leif Hartwig and Jørgen Rask, midfielders Arno Hansen, Erling Nielsen and Per Jacobsen, and forwards Palle Kähler, Walther Richter, Mogens Haastrup, John Danielsen and Mogens Berg. Palle Hansen, Mogens Engstrøm and Bruno Eliasen, who all appeared in the last game of the season, including Jørgen Petersen and Poul Erik Wiinberg, also played their part in the winning season.

BK Frem and B 1903 secured themselves another season in the top-flight division by winning their last games on 15 November 1964, 4–0 at home against Vejle BK and 3–1 away against B 1901, respectively. The decisive match for BK Frem took place at Valby Idrætspark in front of an audience of 3,000 spectators compared to the club's other home matches in the season, that had all been played at Københavns Idrætspark. Akademisk BK, who was also part of the relegation battle, won their last match away against B 1913, but ended up with just one point short in the final standings, so was relegated to the 1965 Danish 2nd Division along with Brønshøj BK.

== Teams ==
Twelve teams competed in the league – the top ten teams from the previous season and the two teams promoted from the second-tier. The promoted teams were B.93, returning to the top flight after a four-year absence, and BK Frem, returning after a three-year absence. They replaced Aalborg BK and Køge BK, ending their top flight spells of one and three years respectively.

=== Stadiums and locations ===
Locations of the 1964 Danish 1st Division teams.

Club	Location	Stadium	Capacity	Ref
Akademisk BK	Gladsaxe	Gladsaxe Idrætspark		
Aarhus GF	Aarhus	Aarhus Idrætspark	22,000	
B.93	Østerbro, Copenhagen	Københavns Idrætspark	50,000	
B 1901	Nykøbing Falster	Nykøbing Falster Stadium		
B 1903	Gentofte	Københavns Idrætspark; Gentofte Stadium	50,000; 16,300	
B 1909	Odense	Odense Stadium	28,000	
B 1913	Odense	Odense Stadium	28,000	
Brønshøj BK	Brønshøj-Husum, Copenhagen	Københavns Idrætspark	50,000	
Esbjerg fB	Esbjerg	Esbjerg Stadium	20,000	
BK Frem	Valby, Copenhagen	Københavns Idrætspark (21 matches); Valby Idrætspark (1 match)	50,000; 6,000	
Kjøbenhavns BK	Frederiksberg	Københavns Idrætspark	50,000	
Vejle BK	Vejle	Vejle Stadium	20,000	

=== Personnel ===
Team	Head coach	Captain	Ref
Akademisk BK	(Denmark) Ivan Jessen		
Aarhus GF	(Hungary) Géza Toldi		
B.93	(Denmark) Knud Petersen	(Denmark) Jørgen Jacobsen	
B 1901	(Denmark) Kurt "Nikkelaj" Nielsen		
B 1903	(Denmark) Simon Mathiesen		
B 1909	(Hungary) Carlos Pintér	(Denmark) Erling Nielsen (Denmark) Bruno Eliasen	
B 1913	(Denmark) Jack Johnson		
Brønshøj BK	(Denmark) Jørn Larsen		
Esbjerg fB	(Denmark) Arne Sørensen	(Denmark) Jens Jørgen Hansen	
BK Frem	(Denmark) Erling Sørensen	(Denmark) Birger Larsen	
Kjøbenhavns BK	(Austria) Walter Presch		
Vejle BK	(Austria) Ernst Netuka		

=== Coaching changes ===
Team	Outgoing coach	Manner of departure	Date of vacancy	Position in table	Incoming coach	Date of appointment	Ref
Brønshøj BK	(Denmark) Ejnar Olsen	End of contract	31 December 1963	Pre-season	(Denmark) Jørn Larsen	1 January 1964	
Kjøbenhavns BK	(Hungary) Carlos Pintér	End of contract	31 December 1963	Pre-season	(Austria) Walter Presch	1 January 1964	
B 1909	(Germany) Alfons "Ali" Remlein	End of contract	31 December 1963	Pre-season	(Hungary) Carlos Pintér	1 January 1964	

== League table ==
Every team played two games against the other teams, at home and away, totaling 22 games each. Teams received two points for a win and one point for a draw. If two or more teams were tied on points, places were determined by goal average. The team with the most points were crowned winners of the league, while the two teams with the fewest points would be relegated to the 1965 Danish 2nd Division.

Pos	Team	Pld	W	D	L	GF	GA	GR	Pts	Promotion, qualification or relegation
1	B 1909 (C)	22	14	3	5	53	33	1.606	31	Qualification for the 1964–65 European Cup and 1965–66 European Cup (Note: B 1909 qualified for the 1964–65 European Cup preliminary round as league leaders after the conclusion of the spring season, and qualified for the 1965–66 European Cup preliminary round as the overall 1964 season champions.)
2	Aarhus GF	22	14	2	6	49	34	1.441	30	
3	Kjøbenhavns BK	22	13	3	6	62	41	1.512	29	Qualification for the 1964–65 Inter-Cities Fairs Cup (Note: B 1913 and Kjøbenhavns BK qualified for the 1964–65 Inter-Cities Fairs Cup first round by finishing in the second and third place respectively in the spring season's league standings.)
4	Esbjerg fB	22	11	6	5	48	30	1.600	28	Qualification for the 1964–65 European Cup Winners' Cup (Note: Esbjerg fB qualified for the 1964–65 European Cup Winners' Cup first round by winning the 1963–64 Danish Cup.)
5	Vejle BK	22	10	5	7	35	32	1.094	25	
6	B 1913	22	9	5	8	42	42	1.000	23	Qualification for the 1964–65 Inter-Cities Fairs Cup
7	B 1901	22	8	3	11	42	47	0.894	19	
8	B.93	22	6	6	10	34	40	0.850	18	
9	BK Frem	22	6	6	10	29	35	0.829	18	
10	B 1903	22	6	6	10	36	48	0.750	18	
11	Akademisk BK (R)	22	6	5	11	32	39	0.821	17	Relegation to the 1965 Danish 2nd Division
12	Brønshøj BK (R)	22	2	4	16	22	63	0.349	8	Relegation to the 1965 Danish 2nd Division

Rules for classification: 1) Points 2) Goal average
(C) Champions; (R) Relegated

== Results ==
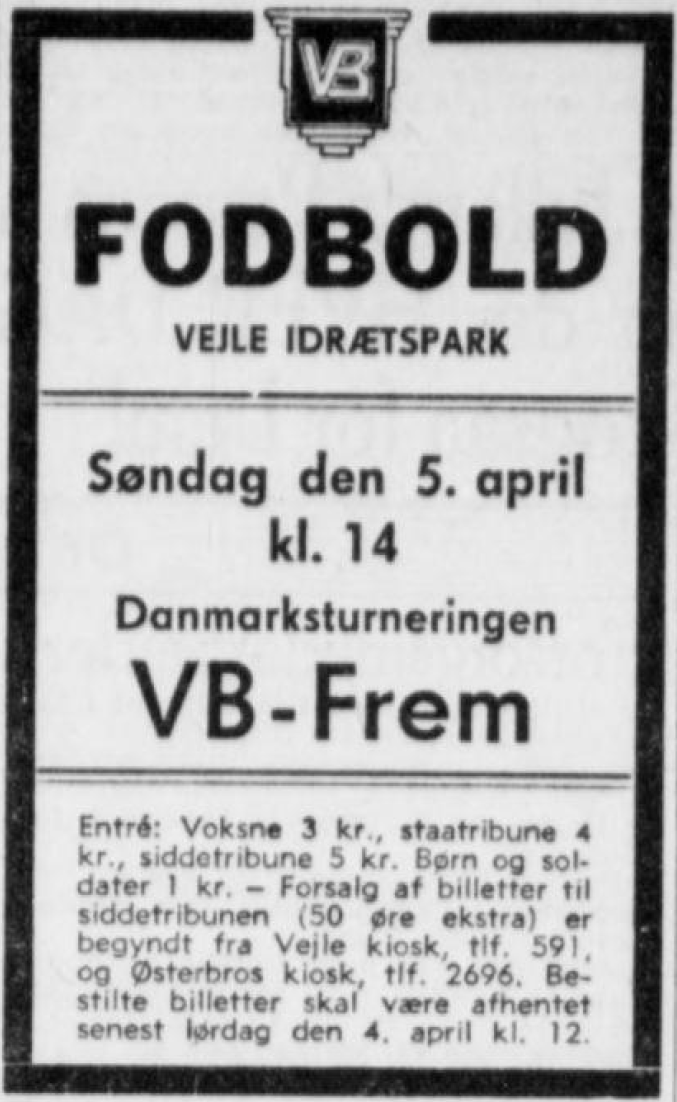
Newspaper advertisement for the match on 5 April 1964 between Vejle BK and BK Frem at Vejle Stadium.

Home \ Away	ABK	AGF	B93	B01	B03	B09	B13	BBK	EFB	BKF	KBK	VBK
Akademisk BK	—	0–1	1–1	2–3	1–4	1–4	1–1	3–0	0–3	1–0	1–2	0–2
Aarhus GF	2–2	—	1–0	2–1	5–0	5–1	0–1	7–1	1–0	4–2	3–2	2–1
B.93	2–2	3–1	—	4–2	3–1	1–1	0–1	2–0	2–3	1–1	0–3	0–1
B 1901	2–0	0–2	2–0	—	1–3	2–2	2–3	1–1	0–1	3–1	4–2	2–0
B 1903	1–2	4–2	1–1	2–1	—	2–2	2–0	3–2	0–0	0–2	2–4	2–3
B 1909	2–1	4–1	2–0	3–2	6–1	—	1–3	5–1	1–3	3–1	6–2	2–0
B 1913	1–2	1–3	5–3	3–3	1–1	3–1	—	5–2	3–2	0–1	1–3	1–1
Brønshøj BK	0–6	0–1	2–5	4–1	1–1	1–3	1–2	—	0–2	1–3	0–4	0–0
Esbjerg fB	1–1	2–2	2–2	5–1	5–2	0–1	3–2	5–1	—	2–2	3–1	1–2
BK Frem	0–2	1–2	0–3	1–2	2–1	2–0	1–1	1–1	0–2	—	2–2	4–0
Kjøbenhavns BK	5–3	4–0	5–1	5–3	2–1	0–1	5–1	2–1	5–2	2–2	—	2–2
Vejle BK	2–0	4–2	3–0	1–4	2–2	1–2	4–3	1–2	1–1	2–0	2–0	—

Legend: Blue = home team win; Yellow = draw; Red = away team win.

== Statistics ==
=== Scoring ===
==== Top scorers ====
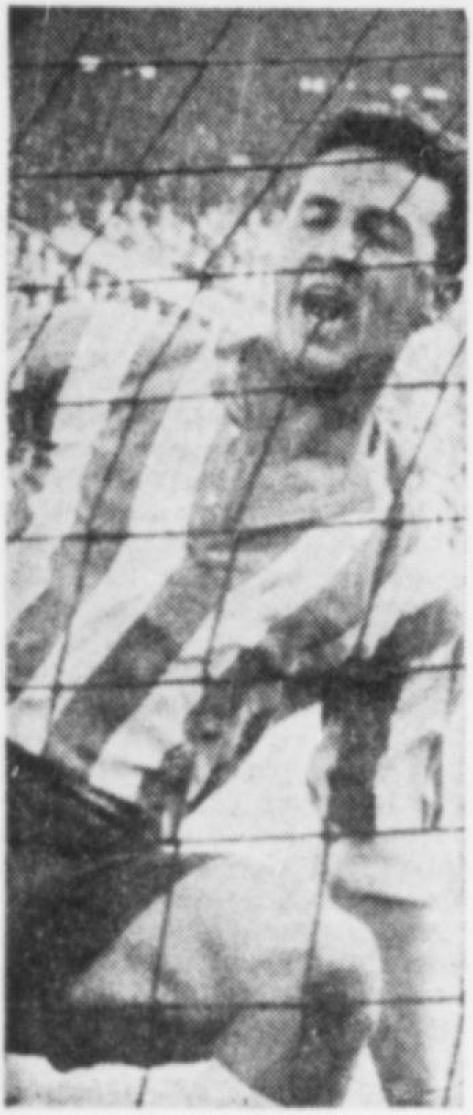
The league's top goalscorer in the 1964 season with 21 goals, Jørgen Ravn, of Kjøbenhavns BK.

Rank	Player	Club	Goals
1	(Denmark) Jørgen Ravn	Kjøbenhavns BK	21
2	(Denmark) Finn Møller	Kjøbenhavns BK	18
3	(Denmark) Mogens Haastrup	B 1909	17
4	(Denmark) Ole Fritsen	Vejle BK	13
4	(Denmark) Carl Emil Christiansen	Esbjerg fB	13
4	(Denmark) Henning Enoksen	Aarhus GF	13
7	(Denmark) Svend Petersen	B.93	12
8	(Denmark) Henning Jørgensen	B 1901	11
8	(Denmark) Kjeld Petersen	B 1913	11
8	(Denmark) Ole Forsing	B 1903	11
11	(Denmark) John Cramer	B 1901	10
12	(Denmark) Kurt Hansen	B 1913	9
12	(Denmark) Jørgen Rasmussen	B 1913	9
12	(Denmark) Jørn Bjerregaard	Aarhus GF	9

==== Hat-tricks ====
Player	For	Against	Result	Date	Ref
(Denmark) Mogens Haastrup	B 1909	Aarhus GF	4–1 (H)	14 May 1964	
(Denmark) Svend Petersen	B.93	B 1901	4–2 (H)	23 August 1964	
(Denmark) Bernhard Deneke	B.93	Brønshøj BK	5–2 (A)	30 August 1964	
(Denmark) Carl Emil Christiansen	Esbjerg fB	B 1903	5–2 (H)	13 September 1964	
(Denmark) Finn Møller	Kjøbenhavns BK	Esbjerg fB	5–2 (H)	27 September 1964	
(Denmark) Mogens Haastrup^{4}	B 1909	Brønshøj BK	5–1 (H)	4 October 1964	
(Denmark) Hans Jørgen Christiansen	Esbjerg fB	Brønshøj BK	5–1 (H)	15 November 1964	

- ^{4} Player scored 4 goals

=== Clean sheets ===
Rank	Player	Club	Matches	Clean sheets	Ref
—	(Denmark) Erik Gaardhøje	Esbjerg fB	20	5	
—	(Denmark) Leif Bernhard Nielsen	BK Frem	21	4	
—	(Denmark) Svend Aage Rask	B 1909	22	4	
