= List of Danish football champions =

The Danish football champions are the winners of the highest league of football in Denmark. The title has been contested since 1913, in a varying form of competitions. Since 1991, the winners have been found through the Danish Superliga championship. The Danish football championship is governed by the Divisionsforeningen.

The early Danish football championships were decided in a single game, and the competition was not nationwide until its structure was altered before the 1927–28 season. Until the 1950s, the winners' list included teams exclusively from the Copenhagen area. Kjøbenhavns Boldklub (KB) thus won 12 of its shared record 15 Danish championships before the 1954–55 season, when Køge Boldklub became the first non-Copenhagen team to be crowned Danish football champions.

A Danish champion has been found every year since 1913, except for 1915 and 1928. In 1915, the tournament was not played because of World War I. In 1928, there was no rule defined for the possibility that two or more teams had the same number of points at the end of the tournament, when three clubs all ended in first place.

== History ==
Upon its founding in 1889, the Danish Football Association (DBU) inaugurated The Football Tournament contested by Copenhagen clubs only, though the winners are not considered official Danish champions. Upon the creation of the Copenhagen Football Association (KBU) in 1903, the administration of The Football Tournament was handed over to the newly founded regional football association, who went on to arrange yearly Copenhagen football championships. As the five other regional football associations emerged – namely Jutland FA (JBU), Zealand FA (SBU), Funen FA (FBU), Lolland-Falster FA (LFBU) and Bornholm FA (BBU) – they also started arranging championships for their own regions, parallel with the Copenhagen Championship.

The first Danish championship, the "National Football Tournament", was played from 1912 to 1913. Through to 1927, the championship was decided in a single final match, with the winner of KBU's Copenhagen football championship directly qualified to play the winner of a series of play-off games between the regional champions from the rest of Denmark. (Note: The winners of the regional JBU (Jutland), FBU (Funen), SBU (Zealand), LFBU (Lolland-Falster) and BBU (Bornholm) competitions.) From 1914 to 1917, the runner-up team from the KBU tournament played a semi-final game against the best team from the rest of Denmark, with the winner facing the KBU champions in the Danish championship final. As the Copenhagen clubs were stronger than the provincial teams, this meant the final game ended up being contested by two clubs from Copenhagen.

Before the 1927–28 season, the first nationwide tournament, the "Denmark Tournament", was inaugurated. 20 teams were divided into five groups of four teams. They played each other once, and the five group winners qualified for a championship deciding group. Here they again played each other once, and the top placed team was declared champions after seven games in all. This lasted only two years before the league system was changed and the tournament renamed to the "Championship League" for the 1929–30 season. The teams were divided into two leagues, a championship series of ten teams and a promotion series with a varying number of clubs each year. This meant that the number of teams competing for the championship was fixed for the course of the tournament, and that every team played each other. The lowest placed team in the championship series and the top placed team in the promotion series would swap places between each season. From the start of the competition in 1929–30, the clubs played each other once to give a total of nine games a season, but from 1936 to 1937 they met twice in a season for a total of 18 games.

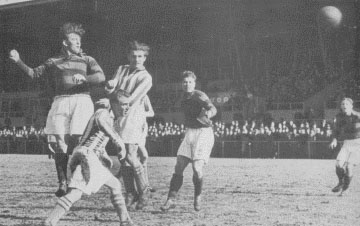
A match between Frem (horizontal stripes) and AB (vertical stripes), circa 1940. 1937 top goalscorer Pauli Jørgensen is on the far left, jumping.

During the German occupation of Denmark in World War II from 1940 to 1945, the championship was again decided in a single final. The format varied throughout the occupation, as a differing number of teams played in three separate tournaments. The best placed teams in each tournament would go on to a string of play-off games, before two teams met in the final.

From the 1945–46 season, the competition reverted to the "Championship League" format, with the tournament now named the "1st Division". There were 10 teams in the top division once again, playing each other twice, with the lowest team being relegated. The 1953–54 season saw the first non-Copenhagen team win the Danish championship, when Køge Boldklub won the title. The championship title was not reclaimed by a Copenhagen team in more than ten years, until Akademisk Boldklub (AB) won the 1967 season.

From 1958, the Danish championship was arranged through one calendar year, and the 1956–57 season lasted 18 months with the teams playing each other thrice for a 27 games total. From 1958 to 1974, the tournament was expanded to 12 teams, playing each other twice for 22 games per season each, but now the bottom two teams faced relegation. The number of teams was increased to 16 for the 1975 season, which resulted in 30 games per season. In 1986, the number of participants was altered once more, this time decreasing the number of teams to 14, and the number of games to 26.

In 1991, the 1st Division was replaced by the "Danish Superliga", with only 10 teams participating. The opening Superliga season was played during the spring of 1991, with the ten teams playing each other twice for the championship title. For the following seasons the tournament structure was once more stretched over two calendar years. In the summer and autumn of 1991, the 10 teams played each other twice in the regular season of the tournament. In the following spring, the bottom two teams would be cut off, while the remaining eight teams entered the post-season tournament with their points cut in half and played each other twice once more, for a total of 32 games in a season. This practice was abandoned before the 1995–96 season, when the number of teams competing was increased to 12, playing each other thrice for 33 games per Superliga season. For the 2016–17 season the league was expanded to 14 teams, and a championship round involving the top 6 teams was introduced. For the 2020–21 season the league was reduced to 12 teams again, but the championship round remained.

== Champions ==
=== Landsfodboldturneringen – National Football Tournament (1913–1927) ===
Year	Winner (titles)	Runners-up
1912–13	KB (1)	B 1901
1913–14	KB (2)	B 93
1914–15	no competition held due to World War I	
1915–16	B 93 (1)	KB
1916–17	KB (3)	AB
1917–18	KB (4)	Randers Freja
1918–19	AB (1)	B 1901
1919–20	B 1903 (1)	B 1901
1920–21	AB (2)	AGF
1921–22	KB (5)	B 1901
1922–23	Frem (1)	AGF
1923–24	B 1903 (2)	B 1913
1924–25	KB (6)	AGF
1925–26	B 1903 (3)	B 1901
1926–27	B 93 (2)	Skovshoved

=== Danmarksmesterskabsturneringen – Denmark's Championship Tournament (1928–1929) ===
Year	Winner (titles)	Runners-up	Top scorer
1927–28	none (Note: No rule was defined for the possibility of two or more teams finishing the tournament with the same number of points. B 93, Frem and B 1903 all ended equal at 6 points, and DBU proposed rematches. When B 93 and Frem refused, B 1903 forfeited the championship, and no champion was chosen. Danish League Tables 1927–1998 by RSSSF.)		not available (Note: No sources chronicle the top goal scorers of the earliest league championships.)
1928–29	B 93 (3)	KB	not available

=== Mesterskabsserien – The Championship Series (1930–1940) ===
Year	Winner (titles)	Runners-up	Top scorer (club) (goals)
1929–30	B 93 (4)	Frem	not available
1930–31	Frem (2)	KB	not available
1931–32	KB (7)	AB	not available
1932–33	Frem (3)	B 1903	not available
1933–34	B 93 (5)	B 1903	not available
1934–35	B 93 (6)	Frem	not available
1935–36	Frem (4)	AB	not available
1936–37	AB (3)	Frem	Pauli Jørgensen (Frem) (19)
1937–38	B 1903 (4)	Frem	Knud Andersen (B 1903) (23)
1938–39	B 93 (7)	KB	Erik Petersen (B 93) (27)
1939–40	KB (8)	Fremad Amager	Frede Jensen (Køge) and Kaj Hansen (B 93) (12)

=== Krigsturneringen – The War Tournaments (1941–1945) ===
Year	Winner (titles)	Runners-up
1940–41	Frem (5)	Fremad Amager
1941–42	B 93 (8)	AB
1942–43	AB (4)	KB
1943–44	Frem (6)	AB
1944–45	AB (5)	AGF

=== 1st Division (1946–1990) ===
Year	Winner (titles)	Runners-up	Top scorer (club) (goals)
1945–46	B 93 (9)	KB	Jørgen Leschly Sørensen (B 93) (16)
1946–47	AB (6)	KB	Helge Broneé (ØB) (21)
1947–48	KB (9)	Frem	John Hansen (Frem) (20)
1948–49	KB (10)	AB	Jørgen Leschly Sørensen (OB) (16)
1949–50	KB (11)	AB	James Rønvang (AB) (15)
1950–51	AB (7)	OB	James Rønvang (AB), Henning Bjerregaard (B 93) and Jens Peter Hansen (Esbjerg) (11)
1951–52	AB (8)	Køge	Valdemar Kendzior (Skovshoved) and Poul Erik Petersen (Køge) (13)
1952–53	KB (12)	Skovshoved	Valdemar Kendzior (Skovshoved) (17)
1953–54	Køge (1)	KB	Jens-Carl Kristensen (AB) (12)
1954–55	AGF (1)	AB	Henning Jensen (Frem) (17)
1955–56	AGF (2)	Esbjerg	Gunnar Kjeldberg (AGF) (18)
1956–57	AGF (3)	AB	Søren Andersen (Frem) (27)
1958	Vejle (1)	Frem	Henning Enoksen (Vejle) (27)
1959	B 1909 (1)	KB	Per Jensen (KB) (20)
1960	AGF (4)	KB	Harald Nielsen (Frederikshavn) (19)
1961	Esbjerg (1)	KB	Jørgen Ravn (KB) (26)
1962	Esbjerg (2)	B 1913	Henning Enoksen (AGF) and Carl Emil Christiansen (Esbjerg) (24)
1963	Esbjerg (3)	B 1913	Mogens Haastrup (B 1909) (21)
1964	B 1909 (2)	AGF	Jørgen Ravn (KB) (21)
1965	Esbjerg (4)	Vejle	Per Petersen (B 1903) (18)
1966	Hvidovre (1)	Frem	Henning Enoksen (AGF) (16)
1967	AB (9)	Frem	Leif Nielsen (Frem) (15)
1968	KB (13)	Esbjerg	Niels-Christian Holmstrøm (KB) (23)
1969	B 1903 (5)	KB	Steen Rømer Larsen (B 1903) (15)
1970	B 1903 (6)	AB	Ole Forsing (B 1903) (18)
1971	Vejle (2)	Hvidovre	Uffe Brage (KB) and John Nielsen (B 1901) (19)
1972	Vejle (3)	B 1903	Karsten Lund (Vejle) and John Nielsen (B 1901) (16)
1973	Hvidovre (2)	Randers Freja	Hans Aabech (Hvidovre) (28)
1974	KB (14)	Vejle	Niels-Christian Holmstrøm (KB) (24)
1975	Køge (2)	Holbæk	Bjarne Petersen (KB) (25)
1976	B 1903 (7)	Frem	Mogens Jespersen (AaB) (22)
1977	OB (1)	B 1903	Allan Hansen (OB) (23)
1978	Vejle (4)	Esbjerg	John Eriksen (OB) (22)
1979	Esbjerg (5)	KB	John Eriksen (OB) (20)
1980	KB (15)	Næstved	Hans Aabech (KB) (19)
1981	Hvidovre (3)	Lyngby	Allan Hansen (OB) (28)
1982	OB (2)	AGF	Ib Jacquet (Vejle) (20)
1983	Lyngby (1)	OB	Vilhelm Munk Nielsen (OB) (20)
1984	Vejle (5)	AGF	Steen Thychosen (Vejle) (24)
1985	Brøndby (1)	Lyngby	Lars Bastrup (Ikast) (20)
1986	AGF (5)	Brøndby	Claus Nielsen (Brøndby) (16)
1987	Brøndby (2)	Ikast FS	Claus Nielsen (Brøndby) (20)
1988	Brøndby (3)	Næstved	Bent Christensen (Brøndby) (21)
1989	OB (3)	Brøndby	Miklos Molnar (Frem), Flemming Christensen (Lyngby) and Lars Jakobsen (OB) (14)
1990	Brøndby (4)	B 1903	Bent Christensen (Brøndby) (17)

=== Danish Superliga (1991–present) ===
Year	Winner (titles)	Runners-up	Top scorer (club) (goals)
1991	Brøndby (5)	Lyngby	Bent Christensen (Brøndby) (11)
1991–92	Lyngby (2)	B 1903	Peter Møller (AaB) (17)
1992–93	F.C. Copenhagen (1)	OB	Peter Møller (AaB) (22)
1993–94	Silkeborg (1)	F.C. Copenhagen	Søren Frederiksen (Silkeborg) (18)
1994–95	AaB (1)	Brøndby	Erik Bo Andersen (AaB) (24)
1995–96	Brøndby (6)	AGF	Thomas Thorninger (AGF) (20)
1996–97	Brøndby (7)	Vejle	Miklos Molnar (Lyngby) (26)
1997–98	Brøndby (8)	Silkeborg	Ebbe Sand (Brøndby) (28)
1998–99	AaB (2)	Brøndby	Heine Fernandez (Viborg) (23)
1999–00	Herfølge (1)	Brøndby	Peter Lassen (Silkeborg) (16)
2000–01	F.C. Copenhagen (2)	Brøndby	Peter Graulund (Brøndby) (21)
2001–02	Brøndby (9)	F.C. Copenhagen	Peter Madsen (Brøndby) and Kaspar Dalgas (OB) (22)
2002–03	F.C. Copenhagen (3)	Brøndby	Søren Frederiksen (Viborg) and Jan Kristiansen (Esbjerg) (18)
2003–04	F.C. Copenhagen (4)	Brøndby	Steffen Højer (OB), Mohamed Zidan (FC Midtjylland), Tommy Bechmann (Esbjerg) and Mwape Miti (OB) (19)
2004–05	Brøndby (10)	F.C. Copenhagen	Steffen Højer (OB) (20)
2005–06	F.C. Copenhagen (5)	Brøndby	Steffen Højer (Viborg) (16)
2006–07	F.C. Copenhagen (6)	FC Midtjylland	Rade Prica (AaB) (19)
2007–08	AaB (3)	FC Midtjylland	Jeppe Curth (AaB) (17)
2008–09	F.C. Copenhagen (7)	OB	Morten Nordstrand (FC København) and Marc Nygaard (Randers) (16)
2009–10	F.C. Copenhagen (8)	OB	Peter Utaka (OB) (18)
2010–11	F.C. Copenhagen (9)	OB	Dame N'Doye (FC København) (25)
2011–12	FC Nordsjælland (1)	F.C. Copenhagen	Dame N'Doye (FC København) (18)
2012–13	F.C. Copenhagen (10)	FC Nordsjælland	Andreas Cornelius (FC København) (18)
2013–14	AaB (4)	F.C. Copenhagen	Thomas Dalgaard (Viborg) (18)
2014–15	FC Midtjylland (1)	F.C. Copenhagen	Martin Pusic (Esbjerg/FC Midtjylland) (17)
2015–16	F.C. Copenhagen (11)	SønderjyskE	Lukas Spalvis (AaB) (18)
2016–17	F.C. Copenhagen (12)	Brøndby	Marcus Ingvartsen (FC Nordsjælland) (23)
2017–18	FC Midtjylland (2)	Brøndby	Pål Alexander Kirkevold (Hobro IK) (22)
2018–19	F.C. Copenhagen (13)	FC Midtjylland	Robert Skov (FC Copenhagen) (29)
2019–20	FC Midtjylland (3)	F.C. Copenhagen	Ronnie Schwartz (Silkeborg IF/FC Midtjylland) (18)
2020–21	Brøndby (11)	FC Midtjylland	Mikael Uhre (Brøndby) (19)
2021–22	F.C. Copenhagen (14)	FC Midtjylland	Nicklas Helenius (Silkeborg IF) (17)
2022–23	F.C. Copenhagen (15)	FC Nordsjælland	Gustav Isaksen (FC Midtjylland) (18)
2023–24	FC Midtjylland (4)	Brøndby	German Onugkha (Vejle) (15)
2024–25	F.C. Copenhagen (16)	FC Midtjylland	Patrick Mortensen (AGF) (20)
2025–26	AGF (6)	FC Midtjylland	Franculino Djú (FC Midtjylland) (17)

== Total titles won ==
The following 20 clubs have won the top league in Danish football.

Club	Winners	Runners-up	Winning years
F.C. Copenhagen (Note: KB and B 1903 merged to form FC København in 1992. Together the three have won 38 championships and been runners-up 26 times.)	16	7	1992–93, 2000–01, 2002–03, 2003–04, 2005–06, 2006–07, 2008–09, 2009–10, 2010–11, 2012–13, 2015–16, 2016–17, 2018–19, 2021–22, 2022–23, 2024–25
KB	15	13	1912–13, 1913–14, 1916–17, 1917–18, 1921–22, 1924–25, 1931–32, 1939–40, 1947–48, 1948–49, 1949–50, 1952–53, 1968, 1974, 1980
Brøndby	11	12	1985, 1987, 1988, 1990, 1991, 1995–96, 1996–97, 1997–98, 2001–02, 2004–05, 2020–21
AB	9	10	1918–19, 1920–21, 1936–37, 1942–43, 1944–45, 1946–47, 1950–51, 1951–52, 1967
B 93	9	1	1915–16, 1926–27, 1928–29, 1929–30, 1933–34, 1934–35, 1938–39, 1941–42, 1945–46
B 1903	7	6	1919–20, 1923–24, 1925–26, 1937–38, 1969, 1970, 1976
Frem	6	9	1922–23, 1930–31, 1932–33, 1935–36, 1940–41, 1943–44
AGF	6	8	1954–55, 1955–56, 1956–57, 1960, 1986, 2025–26
Vejle	5	3	1958, 1971, 1972, 1978, 1984
Esbjerg	5	3	1961, 1962, 1963, 1965, 1979
FC Midtjylland	4	7	2014–15, 2017–18, 2019–20, 2023–24
AaB	4	–	1994–95, 1998–99, 2007–08, 2013–14
OB	3	6	1977, 1982, 1989
Hvidovre	3	1	1966, 1973, 1981
Lyngby	2	3	1983, 1991–92
Køge (Note: Herfølge BK and Køge BK merged to form HB Køge in 2009. Together the three have won 3 championships and been runners-up 1 time.)	2	1	1953–54, 1975
B 1909	2	–	1959, 1964
FC Nordsjælland	1	2	2011–12
Silkeborg	1	1	1993–94
Herfølge	1	–	1999–2000

- Bold clubs play in top flight.
- Italic clubs merged and created superstructures.
Titles won by club (%)
1. F.C. Copenhagen – 16 (14.4%)
2. Kjøbenhavns Boldklub – 15 (13.6%)
3. Brøndby IF – 11 (10.0%)
4. Akademisk Boldklub – 9 (8.20%)
5. Boldklubben af 1893 – 9 (8.20%)
6. Boldklubben 1903 – 7 (6.40%)
7. Boldklubben Frem – 6 (5.50%)
8. Other Teams – 38 (34.5%)

=== Total titles won by city ===
The 20 title-winning clubs have come from a total of 10 cities. The most successful city is Copenhagen.

Total titles won by city
City	Titles	Winning clubs
Greater Copenhagen	78	F.C. Copenhagen (16), KB (15), Brøndby (11), AB (9), B 93 (9), B 1903 (7), Frem (6), Hvidovre (3), Lyngby (2)
Aarhus	6	AGF (6)
Esbjerg	5	Esbjerg fB (5)
Odense	5	OB (3), B 1909 (2)
Vejle	5	Vejle Boldklub (5)
Herning	4	FC Midtjylland (4)
Aalborg	4	AaB (4)
Køge	3	Køge (2), Herfølge (1)
Farum	1	FC Nordsjælland (1)
Silkeborg	1	Silkeborg IF (1)

== Sources ==
- (in Danish) Historien om Danmarksmesterskabet i fodbold at the Danish Football Association
- (in Danish) DanskFodbold.com by the Danish Football Association
- (in Danish) DANMARKSTURNERINGEN at Haslund.info
- Denmark – List of Champions at RSSSF.com
