= Svend Aage Castella =

Danish footballer (1890–1938)

Personal information
- Date of birth: 15 March 1890
- Place of birth: Copenhagen, Denmark
- Date of death: 28 November 1938 (aged 48)
- Place of death: Copenhagen, Denmark

Senior career*
Years	Team	Apps	(Gls)
1907-1924	KB		

International career
1911-1912	Denmark MNT	13	(1)
- * Club domestic league appearances and goals

Svend Aage Castella (15 March 1890 in Copenhagen – 28 November 1938 in Copenhagen) was a Danish amateur football (soccer) player, who played for 13 games and scored one goal for the Denmark national football team.

Castella played his entire career with Copenhagen club KB, with whom he won several Danish football championships. He made his Danish national team debut in October 1911, and was a part of the Danish team at the 1912 Summer Olympics. He was an unused reserve player for the duration of the games, and was not awarded with a medal, as Denmark won silver medals in the 1912 football tournament.

== Honors ==
KB

- Landsfodboldturneringen: Champions - 1912-1913, 1913-1914, 1916-1917, 1917-1918, 1921-1922
- Landsfodboldturneringen: Runners Up - 1915-1916
