= Poul Nielsen =

Danish footballer (1891–1962)

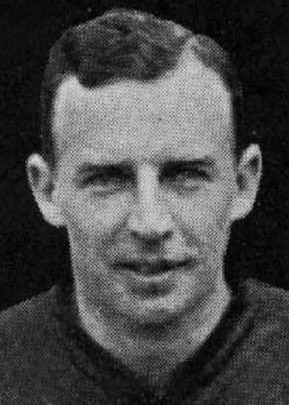

Personal information
- Full name: Niels Poul Nielsen
- Date of birth: 25 December 1891
- Place of birth: Copenhagen, Denmark
- Date of death: 9 August 1962 (aged 70)
- Place of death: Copenhagen, Denmark
- Position: Striker

Youth career
- –1907: Kjøbenhavns Boldklub

Senior career*
Years	Team	Apps	(Gls)
1907–1927	Kjøbenhavns Boldklub		

International career
1910–1925	Denmark	38	(52)
Medal record
Men's Football
Silver medal – second place	1912 Stockholm	Team competition
- * Club domestic league appearances and goals

Niels Poul "Tist" Nielsen (25 December 1891 – 9 August 1962) was a Danish footballer who is the joint all-time top goalscorer for the Denmark national team with 52 goals in 38 matches.

Nielsen won a silver medal with the national team at the 1912 Summer Olympics. He played his career as a striker for Kjøbenhavns Boldklub, with whom he won six Danish football championships.

== Biography ==
As a young boy, Nielsen would sneak in to watch football games without paying, thus becoming a gratist (free rider), abbreviated to "Tist". Born in Copenhagen, Nielsen started playing football with Kjøbenhavns Boldklub (KB), where he spent his entire senior career. He made his debut for the Denmark national team on 5 May 1910 as the then youngest player, at 18 years and 131 days of age (exceeding Vilhelm Wolfhagen's age record from 1908). Nielsen's record would remain for eight years, until it was surpassed by Valdemar Laursen's debut in October 1918 at the age of 18 years and 51 days old.

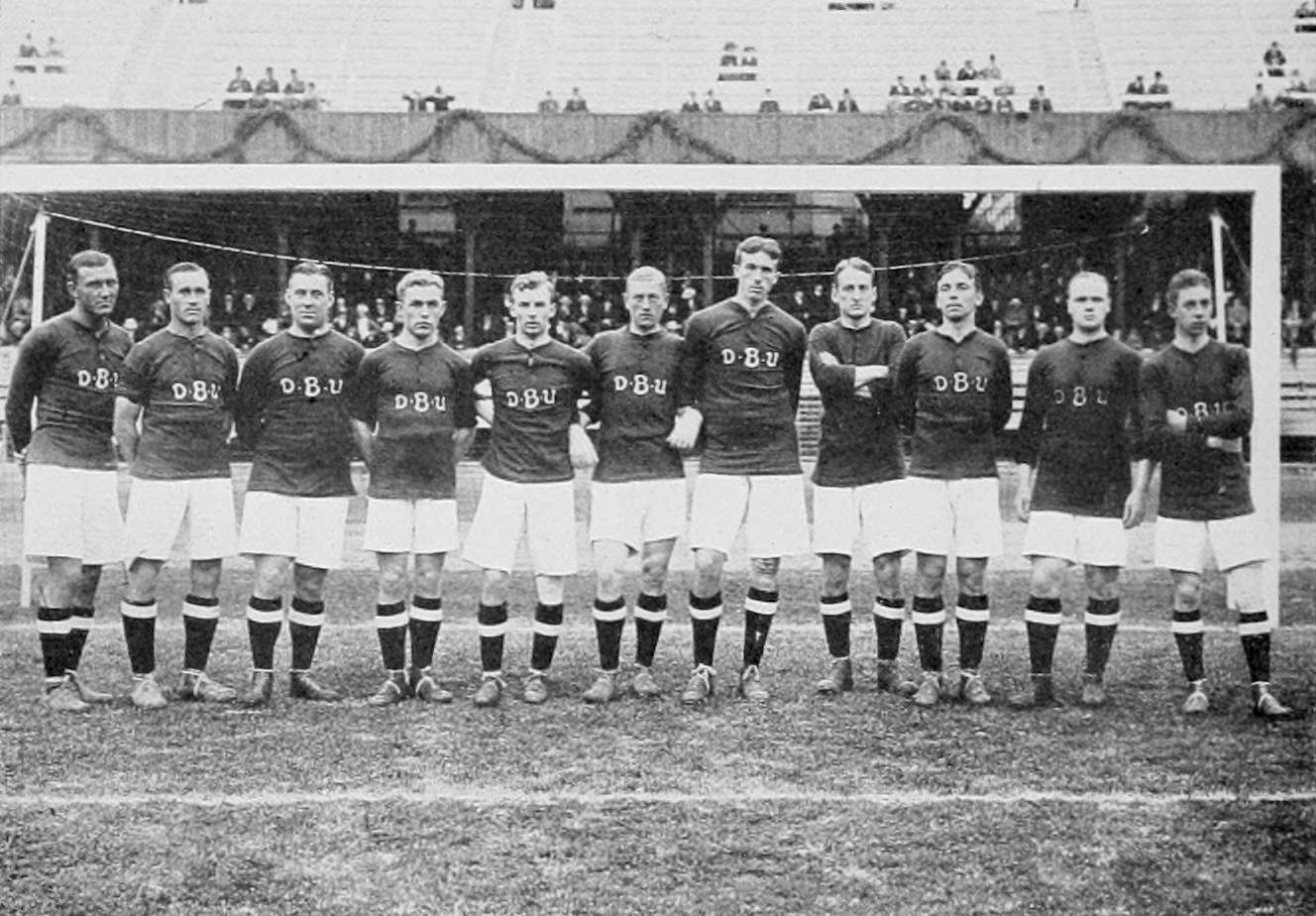
Denmark national team at the 1912 Olympics

Nielsen made his debut in a Denmark national team that was playing its first game since winning silver medals at the 1908 Summer Olympics, and he was included in the Danish squad for the 1912 Summer Olympics tournament. He played one game at the 1912 Olympics, the 4–1 win against the Netherlands, where he scored his first national team goal in his third national team game. Denmark later successfully defended their Olympic silver medal, losing 2–4 to Great Britain in the final game, without Nielsen in the team. After the 1912 Olympics, Nielsen started scoring goals for the Denmark national team at a record-setting pace, while guiding KB to two Danish championships in a row during 1913 and 1914. He scored 22 goals in his first nine national team games after the 1912 Olympics, from May 1913 to June 1916, including six goals in a 10–0 win against Sweden and all four Danish goals in a 4–1 win against Germany. His tally in June 1916 was 23 goals in 12 national team games.

He was a part of the KB team that won the 1917, 1918, 1922 and 1925 Danish championships, making 201 appearances for the club during this time. During the 1910–11 football season, he scored 47 of KB's 63 goals over the course of 10 matches, winning the Copenhagen championship. On 14 October 1923, Nielsen broke Sophus Hansen's record from 1920, becoming became the first Dane to play 32 international games. He ended his national team career in September 1925, having scored a total 52 goals in 38 matches, including 26 goals against Norway and 15 goals against Sweden. Although Nielsen played during the 1910s and 1920s, the number of goals he scored for his country is still the national record, and was not equalled until Jon Dahl Tomasson scored his 52nd goal in June 2010. Nielsen's tally of 38 international matches was another Danish record, but it was exceeded by Michael Rohde in June 1931. Because his career spanned the nascent years of international football, Nielsen never got a chance to play in the World Cup; his only world game was the 1912 Summer Olympics. However, Nielsen managed to score eight hat-tricks in his international career.

Nielsen died in Copenhagen on 9 August 1962, aged 70. His body was laid to rest at Bispebjerg Cemetery at his request. He was posthumously inducted into the Danish Football Hall of Fame in 2014.

== Career statistics ==
=== International ===
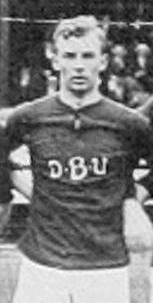
Nielsen with Denmark

Appearances and goals by national team and year
National team	Year	Apps	Goals
Denmark	1910	1	0
Denmark	1911	1	0
Denmark	1912	1	1
Denmark	1913	3	11
Denmark	1914	2	4
Denmark	1915	3	5
Denmark	1916	3	6
Denmark	1917	3	5
Denmark	1918	1	1
Denmark	1919	4	7
Denmark	1920	0	0
Denmark	1921	2	3
Denmark	1922	5	3
Denmark	1923	3	0
Denmark	1924	3	4
Denmark	1925	3	2
Total		38	52

== Honours ==
KB

- Danish championship: 1912–13, 1913–14, 1916–17, 1917–18, 1921–22, 1924–25

Individual

- Danish Football Hall of Fame

== See also ==
- List of top international men's football goalscorers by country
- List of men's footballers with 50 or more international goals
- List of footballers who achieved hat-trick records
