= Einar Middelboe =

Danish footballer and ice hockey player

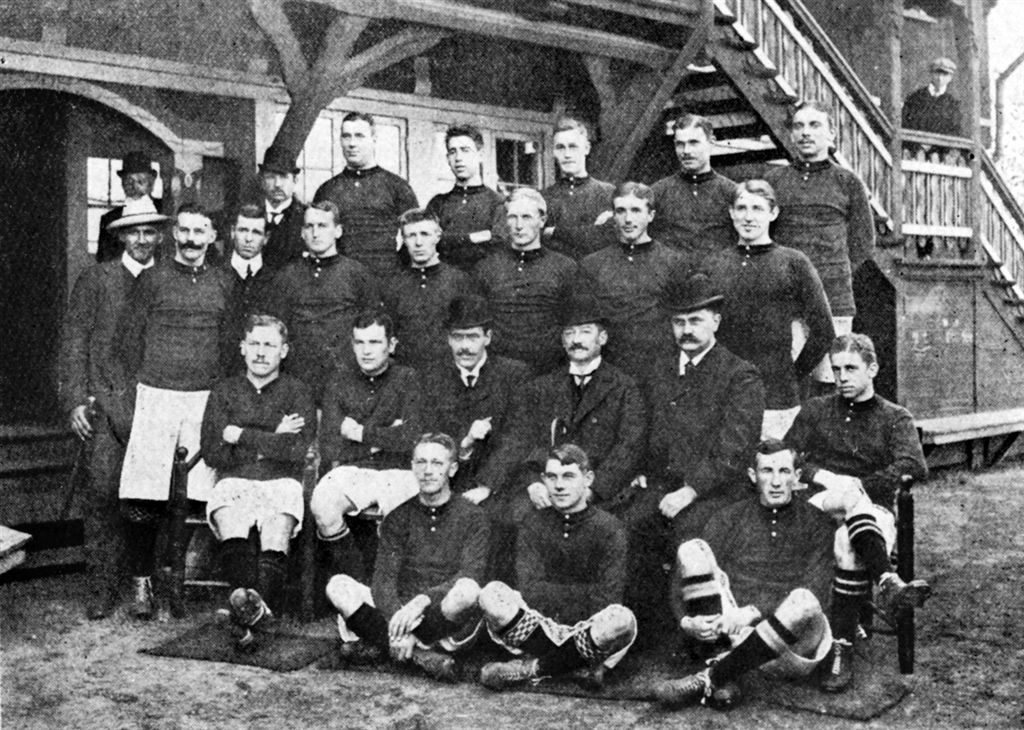
- Denmark's Olympic team in London in 1908.

Personal information
- Full name: Einar Middelboe
- Date of birth: 25 September 1883
- Place of birth: Arild, Sweden
- Date of death: 31 December 1968 (aged 85)
- Place of death: Frederiksberg, Denmark
- Position: Midfielder

Youth career
- 1898–1900: Kjøbenhavns Boldklub

Senior career*
Years	Team	Apps	(Gls)
1900–1914	Kjøbenhavns Boldklub		

International career
1908	Denmark	0	(0)
- * Club domestic league appearances and goals

Medal record

Men's football

Representing Denmark

Olympic Games
Silver medal – second place	1908 London	Team competition

Einar Middelboe (25 September 1883 – 31 December 1968) was a Danish footballer who played as a midfielder for Kjøbenhavns Boldklub. He was one of the listed players of the Danish football squad that competed in the 1908 Summer Olympics, but did not play in any of the matches at the competition. He is the brother of Kristian Middelboe and Nils Middelboe, both of which played for the Danish national team.

== Early life ==
Einar Middelboe was born as the son of painter Bernhard Middelboe and his wife Hilda Horndahl. He had one sister and three younger brothers, including Kristian and Nils. When Einar was 8 years old in 1891, the Middelboe family moved from Brunnby in Scania to Frederiksberg in Copenhagen, and on 26 February 1910 he became a Danish citizen. Transportation in Copenhagen, from Banegården to their home in Frederiksberg on the Falkoner Allé street, took place with the only tram that ran between Frederiksberg and Halmtorvet (now Rådhuspladsen).

== Official career ==
Middelboe went to Hjort and Otterstrøms School, and then he went to the Copenhagen Technical College, apprenticed in his father's business, Bernh. Middelboes Re-prodnktionsanstalt (Danish: Bernh. Middelboes Reproduction Institute), and took over this company in 1931. He ran it as sole owner until 1941, when his son, Steen Middelboe, and four employees, Vilhelm Scherling, Harry Clausen, Leo Bursøe, and Helmuth Jørgensen were admitted as co-owners. The company started at Sankt Peders Stræde 34, but later moved to Bredgade 34.

His father was Kemigraflauget's first alderman, an office that his son Einar also held from 1938, five years after he had been elected to the board of the Kemigraflauget in 1933. He was also a member of the board of the Graphic Association and was a censor at the School of Arts and Crafts.

== Sporting career ==
When the family moved to Copenhagen in 1891, the three eldest of us went to Frederiksborg Latin School and the Real School on Hollændervej; the school had two small football pitches and this certainly contributed to them becoming interested in football and ending up joining Kjøbenhavns Boldklub (KB), which came to mean a lot to the three of them, throughout their lives.

Middelboe joined KB in 1898, aged just 15, and was promoted to the first team in 1900, aged just 17. He remained at the club for 14 years, until retiring in 1914. During this period, Middelboe helped the club win two Danish championships in 1912–13 and 1913–14, among other things. After his football career, Middelboe became a member of KB's board in 1914, and in 1931 he became the club's deputy chairman. He was awarded Kjøbenhavns Boldklub's Medal of Honor in Gold.

Despite the fact that he was still a Swedish citizen at the time, Einar Middelboe was selected for the Danish squad that won a silver medal football tournament of the 1908 Olympics in London. However, he was not awarded a bronze medal due to have not played, but his two brothers, Nils and Kristian, received medals, with the latter being the team's captain.

He was also a skilled bandy player in KSF and one of the leading forces when ice hockey was introduced in Denmark. In 1929 he was on the Copenhagen team with several former national team football players such as Vilhelm Wolfhagen, Poul Graae, and Harry Bendixen, which played against Swedish Södertälje SK in the first international match for a Danish ice hockey team.

== Later life ==
Einar also wrote a birthday song to his mother Hilda on her 70th birthday in 1922.

He died on 31 December 1968, aged 85.

== Honours ==
Kjøbenhavns Boldklub

- Danish Championship:
  - Winner (2): 1912–13 and 1913–14
