= Aage Jørgensen (footballer) =

Danish footballer (1903–1967)

Personal information
- Date of birth: 2 December 1903
- Date of death: 2 November 1967 (aged 63)
- Position: Midfielder

Senior career*
Years	Team	Apps	(Gls)
1920–1930	KB		

International career
1923–1929	Denmark	7	(0)
Medal record
Men's Football
Representing Denmark
Nordic Football Championship
Winner	1924–28
Third place	1929–32
- * Club domestic league appearances and goals

Aage Jørgensen (2 December 1903 – 2 January 1967) was a Danish footballer who played as a midfielder. He was a one club man for Kjøbenhavns Boldklub, commonly known as KB. Jørgensen played in seven matches for the Denmark national team between 1923 and 1929, including at the 1924–28 Nordic Football Championship, which was won by Denmark.

== Club career ==
Jørgensen's entire club career was spent at KB in Frederiksberg, near Copenhagen. He was a part of the KB sides that won the Danish National Football Tournament in the 1921–22 and 1924–25 seasons.

== International career ==
Jørgensen played in seven matches for the Denmark national team. His debut was in October 1923, a 3–1 friendly victory over Sweden at Råsunda Stadium in Stockholm. In the match, Jørgensen's 87th minute free kick found the head of teammate Viggo Jørgensen, who nodded the ball down to the third Danish goalscorer of the day, Karl Wilhelmsen. He represented Denmark at two Nordic Football Championships, including the 1924–28 championship that was won by Jørgensen's Denmark and the 1929–32 championship where Denmark finished third. Jørgensen retired from both club and international football shortly after his final match for his country, a 5–2 defeat at home to Norway in the 1929–32 championship.
