= Mogens =

Mogens is a Danish masculine given name (specifically Danish shake-up of Magnus), and may refer to:

- Mogens Ballin, Danish artist, one of a group of painters who gathered in the Breton village of Pont-Aven
- Mogens Berg (born 1944), Danish former football player
- Jens Mogens Boyesen (1920–1996), Norwegian diplomat and politician for the Labour Party
- Mogens Brandt (1909–1970), Danish film actor
- Mogens Camre (1936–2016), Danish politician and member of the European Parliament with the Danish People's Party
- Mogens Christensen (1929–2020), Norwegian luger
- Mogens Christiansen (born 1972), former Danish cricketer
- Mogens Ellegaard (1935–1995), of Denmark, regarded as the "father of the classical accordion"
- Mogens Bay Esbensen (born 1930), Danish born chef and author, introduced Thai cuisine and ingredients to Australia
- Mogens Fog (1906–1990), Danish physician, politician (Danish Communist Party) and resistance fighter
- Mogens Frey, retired Danish road bicycle racer
- Mogens Glistrup (1926–2008), controversial Danish politician, lawyer, tax protester and member of the Danish parliament
- Mogens Gøye (1470–1544), wealthy Danish statesman and Steward of the Realm
- Mogens Guldberg (born 1963), former middle-distance runner from Denmark
- Mogens Gyldenstierne (1481 or 1485–1569), led the defense of Norway against King Christian II
- Mogens Haastrup (born 1939), Danish former amateur football (soccer) player
- Carsten Mogens Hansen (born 1957), Danish Social Democrat politician
- Mogens Herman Hansen FBA (born 1940), Danish classical philologist and classical demographer
- Mogens Winkel Holm (1936–1999), Danish composer
- Mogens Jeppesen (born 1953), former Danish handball player
- Mogens Jespersen (born 1949), Danish former football (soccer) player
- Mogens Koch (1898–1993), Danish architect and furniture designer, professor at the Royal Danish Academy of Fine Arts
- Mogens Krogh (born 1963), Danish retired professional football (soccer) player
- Mogens Lassen (1901–1987), Modernist Danish architect and designer within the idiom of the International Style
- Mogens Lüchow (1918–1989), Danish fencer
- Mogens Lykketoft (born 1946), Danish politician, former government minister and current Speaker of the Folketing
- Victor Mogens (1886–1964), Norwegian journalist, editor and politician for Fedrelandslaget
- Mogens Dahl Nielsen (born 1972), former Danish cricketer
- Mogens Pedersøn (1583–1623), Danish instrumentalist and composer
- Mogens Rukov, Danish screenwriter
- Mogens Schou (1918–2005), Danish psychiatrist, groundbreaking researcher into Lithium to treat bipolar illness
- Mogens Skeel (1651–1694), Danish playwright
- Mogens Thomassen (1914–1987), Danish field hockey player
- Mogens Thorsen (1790–1863), Norwegian shipowner
- Mogens Truelsen (1901–1979), Danish sprinter
- Mogens Venge (1912–1996), Danish field hockey player
- Mogens Wieth (1919–1962), Danish film actor
- Mogens Wöldike (1897–1988), Danish conductor, choirmaster, organist, and scholar

== See also ==
- Mogensen
