= 2025 Mariagerfjord municipal election =

Municipal election in Denmark

← 2021	18 November 2025	2029 →

All 29 seats to the Mariagerfjord municipal council 15 seats needed for a majority
- Turnout: 23,308 (69.6%) ▲1.9%
	First party	Second party	Third party
	A	V	Æ
Party	Social Democrats	Venstre	Denmark Democrats
Last election	11 seats, 36.8%	11 seats, 32.3%	Did not stand
Seats won	10	7	5
Seat change	▼1	▼4	▲5
Popular vote	7,088	5,429	3,777
Percentage	30.8%	23.6%	16.4%
Swing	▼6.0%	▼8.7%	New
	Fourth party	Fifth party	Sixth party
	C	F	O
Party	Conservatives	Green Left	Danish People's Party
Last election	3 seats, 11.5%	1 seat, 3.1%	1 seat, 4.6%
Seats won	4	2	1
Seat change	▲1	▲1	0
Popular vote	2,937	1,797	882
Percentage	12.8%	7.8%	3.8%
Swing	▲1.3%	▲4.8%	▼0.7%
Mayor before election
Mogens Jespersen
Venstre
Mayor after election
Jesper Skov Mikkelsen
Venstre

The 2025 Mariagerfjord Municipal election was held on November 18, 2025, to elect the 29 members to sit in the regional council for the Mariagerfjord Municipal council, in the period of 2026 to 2029. Jesper Skov Mikkelsen from Venstre would win the mayoral position, taking over from Mogens Jespersen of Venstre as well.

== Background ==
Following the 2021 election, Mogens Jespersen from Venstre was re-elected for a third consecutive term as mayor of Mariagerfjord Municipality. However, Jespersen will not seek re-election in this election. Instead, Jesper Skov Mikkelsen will be the mayoral candidate for Venstre.

== Electoral system ==
For elections to Danish municipalities, a number varying from 9 to 31 are chosen to be elected to the municipal council. The seats are then allocated using the D'Hondt method and a closed list proportional representation. Mariagerfjord Municipality had 29 seats in 2025.

Unlike in Danish General Elections, in elections to municipal councils, electoral alliances are allowed.

== Electoral alliances ==
=== Electoral Alliance 1 ===
Party		Political alignment
A	Social Democrats	Centre-left
F	Green Left	Centre-left to Left-wing
Å	The Alternative	Centre-left to Left-wing

=== Electoral Alliance 2 ===
Party		Political alignment
C	Conservatives	Centre-right
I	Liberal Alliance	Centre-right to Right-wing
K	Christian Democrats	Centre to Centre-right
O	Danish People's Party	Right-wing to Far-right
V	Venstre	Centre-right
Æ	Denmark Democrats	Right-wing to Far-right

== Results by polling station ==
Division	A	C	F	I	K	O	V	Æ	Å
Division	%	%	%	%	%	%	%	%	%
Assens Hallen	21.1	37.7	8.2	2.4	0.4	3.1	10.0	15.9	1.2
Mariager	24.2	22.2	10.1	3.3	0.3	4.3	20.1	14.0	1.7
Arden	45.2	5.2	5.2	2.1	0.1	2.6	25.5	13.5	0.7
Valsgård	30.7	10.8	6.8	3.8	0.6	3.8	24.0	17.7	1.8
Vebbestrup	19.7	4.6	4.4	4.2	0.2	5.8	38.7	20.5	1.8
Hadsund	29.2	16.6	5.3	1.9	0.3	2.4	22.2	21.1	1.0
Veddum-Skelund	27.8	9.0	2.7	8.1	0.0	3.2	25.9	22.0	1.2
Als	28.5	7.3	4.1	3.2	0.2	3.0	33.7	19.6	0.4
Hørby (Rosendalhallen)	27.8	9.1	7.7	4.3	0.3	4.4	27.8	17.3	1.4
Onsild	22.3	10.6	7.1	3.4	0.3	6.7	22.6	24.8	2.2
Hobro	37.2	9.8	11.9	2.0	0.3	4.3	20.9	11.4	2.1

== Results ==
Party		Votes	%	+/-	Seats	+/-
Mariagerfjord Municipality
A	Social Democrats	7,088	30.85	-5.97	10	-1
V	Venstre	5,429	23.63	-8.71	7	-4
Æ	Denmark Democrats	3,777	16.44	New	5	New
C	Conservatives	2,937	12.78	+1.27	4	+1
F	Green Left	1,797	7.82	+4.76	2	+1
O	Danish People's Party	882	3.84	-0.72	1	0
I	Liberal Alliance	660	2.87	New	0	New
Å	The Alternative	342	1.49	New	0	New
K	Christian Democrats	67	0.29	-0.22	0	0
Total		22,979	100	N/A	29	N/A
Invalid votes		77	0.23	+0.02		
Blank votes		252	0.75	+0.10		
Turnout		23,308	69.63	+1.94		
Source: valg.dk

== Opinion polls ==
Polling firm	Fieldwork date	Sample size	A	V	C	O	F	K	I	Å	Æ	Lead
Epinion	4 Sep - 13 Oct 2025	487	32.1	16.2	10.2	8.0	7.7	–	4.2	2.0	18.6	13.5
2024 european parliament election	9 Jun 2024		18.0	16.5	6.5	6.5	11.4	–	5.4	1.7	22.0	4.0
2022 general election	1 Nov 2022		33.0	11.7	5.0	1.8	4.9	0.4	5.8	1.5	23.3	9.7
2021 regional election	16 Nov 2021		39.1	27.7	12.3	4.8	2.9	0.8	1.0	0.2	–	11.4
2021 municipal election	16 Nov 2021		36.8 (11)	32.3 (11)	11.5 (3)	4.6 (1)	3.1 (1)	0.5 (0)	–	–	–	4.5
