= Jørgen Leschly Sørensen =

Danish footballer (1922–1999)

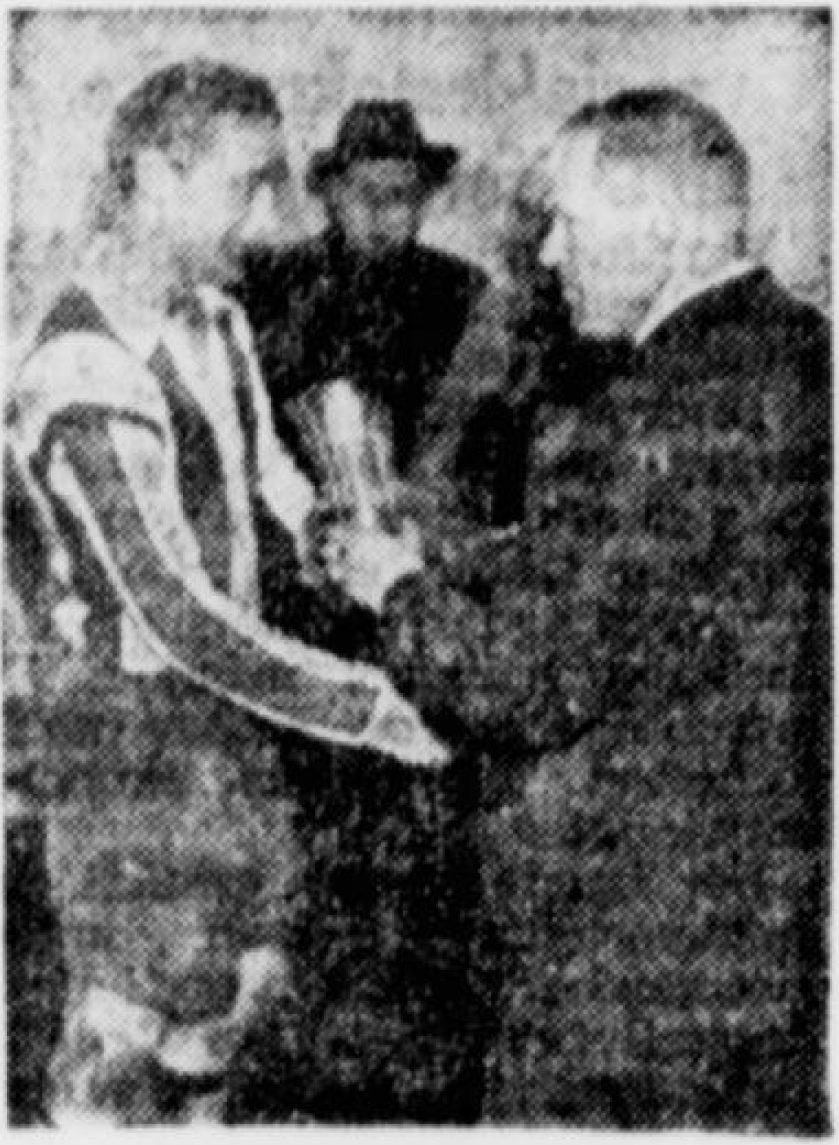
- Jørgen Leschly Sørensen (left) Palle Nielsen (right) 1948

Personal information
- Date of birth: 24 September 1922
- Place of birth: Lumby, Denmark
- Date of death: 21 February 1999 (aged 76)
- Place of death: Odense, Denmark
- Position: Striker

Senior career*
Years	Team	Apps	(Gls)
1939–1944	Odense BK		
1945–1946	B 93	?	(16)
1946–1949	Odense BK		
1949–1953	Atalanta	134	(51)
1953–1955	Milan	64	(28)
1958–1962	Odense BK		

International career
1946–1949	Denmark	14	(8)
Medal record
Denmark
Association football
Summer Olympic Games
Bronze medal – third place	1948 London	Team competition
- * Club domestic league appearances and goals

Jørgen Leschly Sørensen (24 September 1922 – 21 February 1999) was a Danish footballer who played as a forward. He started as an amateur player in Danish football, and won the 1945 Danish championship with B.93. He played 14 games and scored eight goals for the Denmark national football team, and won a bronze medal at the 1948 Summer Olympics. After the Olympics, Sørensen played professionally in Italian football for Atalanta B.C. and A.C. Milan, winning the 1955 Serie A championship with Milan.

== Career ==
=== Danish career ===
Born in Lumby near Odense, Sørensen started playing football at a lower-league club in his hometown. He moved to local club Odense BK in 1939, and made his senior debut for the club. He played with Odense in the amateur-only Danish championship. After World War II, the Danish football leagues were rearranged, and Odense was demoted to the third-tier league of Danish football.

Sørensen spent a year in Copenhagen finishing his education, and approached AB to play for the club while in Copenhagen. AB coach Arne Kleven said he could only use him as a reserve, and Sørensen went on to play for Copenhagen club B 93 instead. Sørensen went on to become league top goalscorer with 16 goals, as B 93 team won the top-flight 1945–46 Danish 1st Division championship. While at B 93, Sørensen made his debut for the Denmark national football team in June 1946, as he scored a goal in Denmark's 1–2 defeat to the Norwegian football team. Upon his return to Odense in 1946, Sørensen found the team in the secondary Danish 2nd Division league. He helped the club win promotion into the top-flight Danish 1st Division in his first year back with the club. He continued to play for the Danish national team while at Odense, and was selected for the Danish squad at the 1948 Summer Olympics. He played one game at the tournament, and scored a goal as Denmark defeated the Great Britain football team 5–3 to win the bronze medals of the tournament. He was top goalscorer with 16 goals in the 1948–49 1st Division season, before moving abroad to play professionally. As a professional he was barred from the amateur-only Danish national team, and Sørensen tallied his total eight goals in 14 national team games from June 1946 to June 1949.

=== Professional career ===
Alongside fellow bronze medalist Karl Aage Hansen, Sørensen joined Atalanta of Bergamo in the Serie A championship of Italian football. It was through Hansen's recommendation, that Bergamo hired Sørensen. In his first time at the club, Bergamo played a friendly match against Sørensen's old club Odense on Odense Stadion. Sørensen was leading the Bergamo players onto the pitch, but as Karl Aage Hansen held back the other Bergamo players, Sørensen entered the pitch on his own to waves of applause from the Odense fans. Sørensen spent four seasons at Atalanta, scoring 51 goals in 134 games, and played alongside fellow Danish international players Svend Jørgen Hansen and Poul Rasmussen at the club. He moved to league rivals A.C. Milan in 1953, and played two seasons with the club, scoring 28 goals in 64 games. He won the 1954–55 Serie A championship in his last season with Milan, before leaving the club in 1955. Milan offered him a contract extension, but Sørensen decided to return to Denmark. He was selected for a European Representative team to play against a Great Britain team to mark the 75th anniversary of the Irish Football Association in August 1955. Sørensen worked defensively to neutralize English player Sir Stanley Matthews, and the European team won 4–1.

When Sørensen returned to Denmark in 1955, he and other ex-professionals were banned from entering the Danish amateur leagues by the Danish Football Association (DBU). The ex-professionals took to playing a series of unofficial, but popular, exhibition matches, centered around Karl Aage Præst's vacation home in Liseleje. In 1958, DBU decided to allow ex-professionals back into Danish football following a two-year quarantine, and as Leschly had already sat out for even longer, he re-entered the amateur-only Danish leagues that year. While banned from playing, he had coached his former club Odense Boldklub. He returned as a player for Odense in 1958, and played for the club until his retirement in 1962. Leschly served as Odense manager again in 1963. Sørensen became a part of the committee which selected the players for the Danish national team in 1970. He was a member of the committee until it was disbanded in 1979, with its responsibilities transferred solely to the Danish national team manager.

== Honours ==
=== Club ===
B.93

- Danish championship: 1945–46

Odense BK

- FBUs Pokalturnering: 1948

Milan

- Serie A: 1954–55

=== International ===
Denmark

- Olympic Bronze Medal: 1948
