= 1947–48 Danish 1st Division =

3rd season of Danish 1st Division

Danish 1st Division
- Season: 1947–48

The 1947–48 Danish 1st Division season was the 3rd edition of Danish 1st Division annual football competition in Denmark. It was contested by 10 teams.

Akademisk Boldklub unsuccessfully defended its 1946 title. Kjøbenhavns Boldklub successfully pursued its 1947 title.

Statistics of Danish 1st Division in the 1947/1948 season.

== League standings ==
| Pos | Team | Pld | W | D | L | GF | GA | GD | Pts |
|---|---|---|---|---|---|---|---|---|---|
| 1 | Kjøbenhavns Boldklub | 18 | 16 | 1 | 1 | 48 | 13 | +35 | 33 |
| 2 | Boldklubben Frem | 18 | 14 | 1 | 3 | 59 | 30 | +29 | 29 |
| 3 | Akademisk Boldklub | 18 | 12 | 2 | 4 | 67 | 37 | +30 | 26 |
| 4 | Aarhus Gymnastikforening | 18 | 8 | 4 | 6 | 38 | 38 | 0 | 20 |
| 5 | Boldklubben 1903 | 18 | 6 | 4 | 8 | 34 | 38 | −4 | 16 |
| 6 | Køge BK | 18 | 5 | 4 | 9 | 39 | 59 | −20 | 14 |
| 7 | Østerbros Boldklub | 18 | 6 | 1 | 11 | 36 | 45 | −9 | 13 |
| 8 | Odense Boldklub | 18 | 4 | 4 | 10 | 38 | 49 | −11 | 12 |
| 9 | Boldklubben af 1893 | 18 | 4 | 4 | 10 | 27 | 41 | −14 | 12 |
| 10 | Fremad Amager | 18 | 1 | 3 | 14 | 19 | 55 | −36 | 5 |

== Results ==
| Home \ Away | ABK | AGF | B93 | B03 | BKF | AMA | KB | KBK | OB | ØBK |
|---|---|---|---|---|---|---|---|---|---|---|
| Akademisk BK | — | 0–1 | 2–1 | 5–4 | 3–4 | 6–1 | 1–5 | 3–0 | 5–0 | 3–2 |
| Aarhus GF | 2–2 | — | 3–2 | 1–1 | 1–4 | 4–1 | 1–2 | 5–0 | 3–1 | 3–2 |
| B.93 | 2–4 | 3–2 | — | 0–2 | 1–2 | 2–0 | 1–1 | 3–3 | 0–2 | 2–4 |
| B 1903 | 1–4 | 5–2 | 0–2 | — | 0–1 | 2–0 | 0–1 | 2–3 | 2–2 | 4–2 |
| BK Frem | 2–3 | 1–1 | 6–1 | 4–1 | — | 3–2 | 1–2 | 5–4 | 4–3 | 1–0 |
| Fremad Amager | 3–3 | 1–1 | 0–3 | 2–2 | 1–4 | — | 0–2 | 2–4 | 4–2 | 1–2 |
| Kjøbenhavns BK | 3–1 | 3–1 | 5–0 | 3–0 | 3–5 | 4–0 | — | 2–0 | 1–0 | 1–0 |
| Køge BK | 2–5 | 2–4 | 2–2 | 3–3 | 0–7 | 1–0 | 2–6 | — | 2–2 | 4–2 |
| Odense BK | 3–7 | 7–1 | 1–1 | 2–3 | 2–0 | 5–1 | 0–3 | 3–5 | — | 3–3 |
| Østerbros BK | 1–10 | 1–2 | 2–1 | 1–2 | 2–5 | 5–0 | 0–1 | 3–2 | 4–0 | — |

Legend: Blue = home team win; Yellow = draw; Red = away team win.
