= 1939–40 Danish Championship League =

Danish Championship League
- Season: 1939–40
- Champions: Kjøbenhavns Boldklub

Following are the statistics of the Danish Championship League in the 1939–40 season.

== Overview ==
It was contested by 10 teams, and Kjøbenhavns Boldklub won the championship.

== League standings ==
Pos	Team	Pld	W	D	L	GF	GA	GD	Pts
1	Kjøbenhavns Boldklub	18	9	6	3	45	27	+18	24
2	Fremad Amager	18	7	8	3	44	36	+8	22
3	Boldklubben af 1893	18	8	4	6	45	36	+9	20
4	Køge BK	18	8	4	6	35	34	+1	20
5	Boldklubben Frem	18	7	6	5	39	38	+1	20
6	Boldklubben 1903	18	8	3	7	39	34	+5	19
7	Aalborg Boldspilklub	18	7	3	8	30	32	−2	17
8	Akademisk Boldklub	18	5	5	8	35	37	−2	15
9	Aarhus Gymnastikforening	18	5	2	11	26	49	−23	12
10	Hellerup IK	18	3	5	10	20	35	−15	11
