= 1914–15 Danish National Football Tournament =

National Football Tournament Landsfodboldturneringen
- Season: 1914–15
- Champions: None, not held

The 1914–15 Danish National Football Tournament was supposed to have been the third Danish football championship, but was cancelled since World War I made travelling greater distances difficult. The regional championships were still held, however.

== Format ==
The tournament would have retained the same format as last year, had it not been cancelled.

== Provincial winners ==
The five provincial winners below would have competed in the province tournament had it been held.

- BBU (Bornholm): IK Viking
- FBU (Funen): Odense BK
- JBU (Jutland): Vejle BK
- LFBU (Lolland-Falster): B 1901
- SBU (Zealand): Helsingør IF

== Copenhagen Championship ==
Pos	Team	Pld	W	D	L	GF	GA	GR	Pts	Qualification or relegation
1	B.93	10	9	1	0	38	13	2.923	19	Qualification for Final
2	Kjøbenhavns Boldklub	10	6	1	3	31	19	1.632	13	Qualification for Semifinal
3	AB	10	5	0	5	38	27	1.407	10	
4	Frem	10	4	0	6	22	27	0.815	8	
5	B 1903	10	2	3	5	19	31	0.613	7	
6	Østerbros BK	10	1	1	8	19	50	0.380	3	

Source: RSSSF
Rules for classification: 1st points. Additional tiebreakers unknown
