= Bernhard Middelboe =

Danish painter (1850–1931)

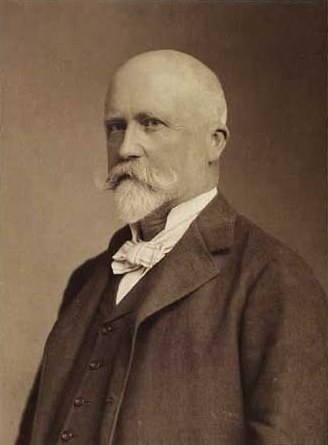
- Middelboe in the 1920s
- Born: 5 February 1870; Ribe, Jutland, Denmark
- Died: 27 June 1942 (aged 72); Frederiksberg, Copenhagen, Denmark
- Resting place: Holmen Cemetery
- Citizenship: Danish
- Occupations: Painter; Farmer
- Known for: Father of Kristian, Einar, and Nils Middelboe

Bernhard Ulrik Middelboe (31 March 1850 – 12 November 1931) was a Danish painter, reproduction technician, and director. He was the brother of naval officer Christian Giørtz Middelboe, and the father of footballers Kristian, Einar, and Nils Middelboe.

== Early life ==
He was the son of customs treasurer, justice councilor Christian Middelboe (1805–1887) and Caroline Christiane Giörtz (1831–1875). He was also the grandson of naval officer Bernhard Middelboe.

== Painting career ==
In 1867, the 17-year-old Middelboe learned bricklaying in Aalborg with master mason Prahl (probably Samuel Johan Tycho Brahe Prahl (1834–1880), but after drawing with C. V. Nielsen, he was admitted to the Academy of Arts in October, from which he only left when he retired as a painter in 1876. One year earlier, Middelboe had already debuted at the Charlottenborg Spring Exhibition with a historical genre picture, Mogens Olufsen Munk says goodbye to Christian II after leaving the letter of resignation in his glove.

With this work, Middelboe competed unsuccessfully for the Neuhausen Prize in 1875, but in 1877 he won the prize for the painting Ewald's Last Day. Together with Viggo Johansen, Peder Severin Krøyer, and others, he had been on a student stay in Hornbæk in the summer of 1873. He then spent the year of 1877–78 in France where he sought out Léon Bonnat's studio in Paris, becoming friends with Laurits Tuxen and Krøyer, making a study trip to Brittany, and at the beginning of 1878, he was living together with Karl Madsen and Holger Drachmann at Saint-Briac-sur-Mer in Brittany. He made over 20 paintings.

== Personal life ==
He married on 1 June 1880 in Copenhagen to Hilda Horndahl (21 October 1852 – 26 March 1924), daughter of ship captain Hans Nilsson Horndahl (1820–1859) and Mathilda Hoberg (1822–1879). Through his marriage to Hilda Horndahl, he was the owner of Rusthallargarden Hotell Arild between 1880 and 1904. They had three children, Kristian, Einar, and Nils Middelboe, all of which became footballers, and with two of them being part of the Denmark national team that won a silver medal football tournament of the 1908 Summer Olympics in London in 1908.

In 1880, he and his wife moved to Brunnby at Scania, where they lived for a dozen years until 1891. There, he lived as a farmer, but continued to cultivate the art of painting as he painted and exhibited a number of portraits, one of which, the marine painter Carl Neumann, was commissioned by the exhibition committee. Among other portraits, one of Count Ludvig Holstein-Ledreborg can be mentioned.

== Pioneer in reproductive engineering ==
Middelboe exhibited for many years at Charlottenborg, but made great demands on himself as an artist and felt that he did not live up to his own expectations, and that is why he accepted an odd offer from printer Frederik Hostrup Schultz, who intended to start a reproduction center with Middelboe as director. Early in the summer of 1890, Middelboe made what must have been the most difficult decision of his life to say goodbye to his art and travel to Paris to familiarize himself with modern photomechanical reproduction methods at the company Photogravure Vitou. In 1890–91, Middelboe returned to Paris to familiarize himself with the method of photoengraving, and in 1891, he moved back to Copenhagen with his whole family.

After his return in 1891, he founded the Bernh. Middelboes Re-prodnktionsanstalt (Danish: Bernh. Middelboes Reproduction Institute). He was among the pioneers of his profession; he himself had to test the various modern methods as they emerged, and since his training as an artist made him place high demands on the exact reproduction, it is not without reason that his company became one of the most respected within the subject. His colleagues then also elected him as their first chairman in 1903, when they succeeded in creating an association for the practitioners of the new profession.

== Death ==
He died on 12 November 1931 in Frederiksberg. He was buried at Holmen Cemetery.

== Legacy ==
Bernhard Middelboe's work has been offered at auction multiple times, with realized prices ranging from 959 USD to US$2,257, depending on the size and medium of the artwork. Since 2019 the record price for this artist at auction is 2,257 dollars for De første sommergæster, sold at Bruun Rasmussen Bredgade in 2022.

== Works ==
=== Paintings ===
- Mogens Munk says goodbye to Christian II after leaving the letter of resignation in his glove (1875)
- Ewald's Last Days (1877, Neuhausen Prize)
- From Montmartre (sketch, 1877)
- A Woman Spinning, Brittany (ex. 1879)
- After the ballet (ex. 1879)
- Visiting the grandmother, Scania (ex. 1880)
- Head of a fishing girl from Arild (1884)
- Potato Digging (1884)
- Garden at the artist's farm in Flundarp (1886)
- Wife collects firewood (Foreningen Fremtidens auktion 1887)
- Wife with sleeping child (as above)
- Early spring, motif from Kullen (exhibit 1887)
- View from Liseleje towards Frederiksværk (ext. 1915)
- Summer day at Arildsläge, Kullen (1920, Museum Sønderjylland)

=== Portraits ===
- The Artist's Father (1879)
- The Artist's Mother (1880)
- Portrait of manufacturer Theodor Hüttemeier (exhibited 1882)
- Ludvig Holstein-Ledreborg (1883)
- Carl Neumann (1891, Charlottenborg)
- Drawings and graphics in the Royal Copper Collection
