= James Rønvang =

Danish footballer (1925–2001)

James Rønvang (17 July 1925 – 16 August 2001) was a Danish amateur football (soccer) player, who played for Akademisk Boldklub in Denmark. He was the top goalscorer of the 1950 and 1951 Danish football championships. He played two games for the Denmark national football team and also played for the Denmark national under-21 football team.
