= Jimmi Klitland =

Danish footballer (born 1982)

Personal information
- Date of birth: 19 February 1982 (age 44)
- Place of birth: Denmark
- Height: 1.80 m (5 ft 11 in)
- Position: Goalkeeper

Team information
- Current team: B.93 (assistant)

Youth career
- Brøndby

Senior career*
Years	Team	Apps	(Gls)
2001–2005	Køge BK	37	(0)
2005–2006	BK Skjold		
2006–2007	Ølstykke	24	(0)
2007–2008	BK Frem	6	(0)
2008–2009	Vejle	0	(0)
2009–2010	Fredericia	1	(0)
2011	Hvidovre	5	(0)
2022	Glostrup	1	(0)

International career
1999–2000	Denmark U-19	4	(0)
- * Club domestic league appearances and goals

Jimmi Klitland (born 19 February 1982) is a Danish retired professional football player and current assistant manager of B.93.

== Career ==
=== Coaching career ===
The first few years after his playing career, Klitland worked at Brøndby IF, where he was goalkeeping coach at the club's reserve team and later at the club's women's team. In 2016 he worked at BK Søllerød-Vedbæk (BSV) where he was goalkeeper coach and physical trainer, while prior to the 2016–17 season he was employed as assistant coach at Ballerup-Skovlunde Fodbold (BSF).

In July 2019 he left BSF to become goalkeeper coach at Brøndby IF's academy. He left Brøndby around the summer of 2022 and became goalkeeper coach at Glostrup FK instead. He also played a game for the club in the Zealand Series.

In September 2023 he was hired as goalkeeping coach at B.93 and also became Head of Goalkeeping at the club, with responsibility for the academy as well. In December 2024, he was promoted to assistant coach under the newly appointed manager Kasper Lorentzen.
