= 1919–20 Danish National Football Tournament =

National Football Tournament Landsfodboldturneringen
- Season: 1919–20
- Champions: Boldklubben 1903

Statistics of Danish National Football Tournament in the 1919/1920 season.

== Province tournament ==
=== First round ===
- Boldklubben 1901 2-1 Boldklubben Søstjernen
- Boldklubben 1909 1-4 Ringkøbing IF

=== Second round ===
- Boldklubben 1901 2-1 Ringkøbing IF

== Copenhagen Championship ==
Pos	Team	Pld	W	D	L	GF	GA	GD	Pts
1	Boldklubben 1903	12	8	1	3	39	19	+20	17
2	Akademisk Boldklub	12	7	2	3	29	16	+13	16
3	Kjøbenhavns Boldklub	12	6	4	2	27	18	+9	16
4	Boldklubben af 1893	12	6	1	5	38	21	+17	13
5	Boldklubben Frem	12	4	3	5	24	20	+4	11
6	Østerbros Boldklub	12	3	3	6	22	38	−16	9
7	KFUM	12	1	0	11	12	59	−47	2

== Final ==
- Boldklubben 1903 2-0 Boldklubben 1901
