= Valdemar Kendzior =

Danish footballer

Valdemar Kendzior (26 January 1926 – 13 October 1998) was a Danish amateur football (soccer) player of Polish descent, who played for Skovshoved IF in Denmark. He was the top goalscorer of the 1952 and 1953 Danish football championships. He played two games and scored three goals for the Denmark national football team.
