= John Nielsen (footballer, born 1946) =

Danish footballer

Personal information
- Date of birth: 26 March 1946 (age 80)
- Place of birth: Denmark
- Position: Forward

Senior career*
Years	Team	Apps	(Gls)
–1968	Nakskov BK		
1968–1969	B 1901		
1969–1971	Göztepe A.Ş.		
1971–1973	B 1901		
1973–1974	Bremerhaven 93		
1974–1977	B 1901		
1977–1978	OSC Bremerhaven		

International career
	Denmark U-21	1	
- * Club domestic league appearances and goals

John Nielsen (born 26 March 1946) is a Danish former footballer who played as a forward, finishing the top goalscorer of the 1971 and 1972 Danish football championships for B 1901. He played one game for the Denmark national under-21 football team. He moved abroad to play professionally for Göztepe A.Ş. and FC Bremerhaven.
