= Hjort =

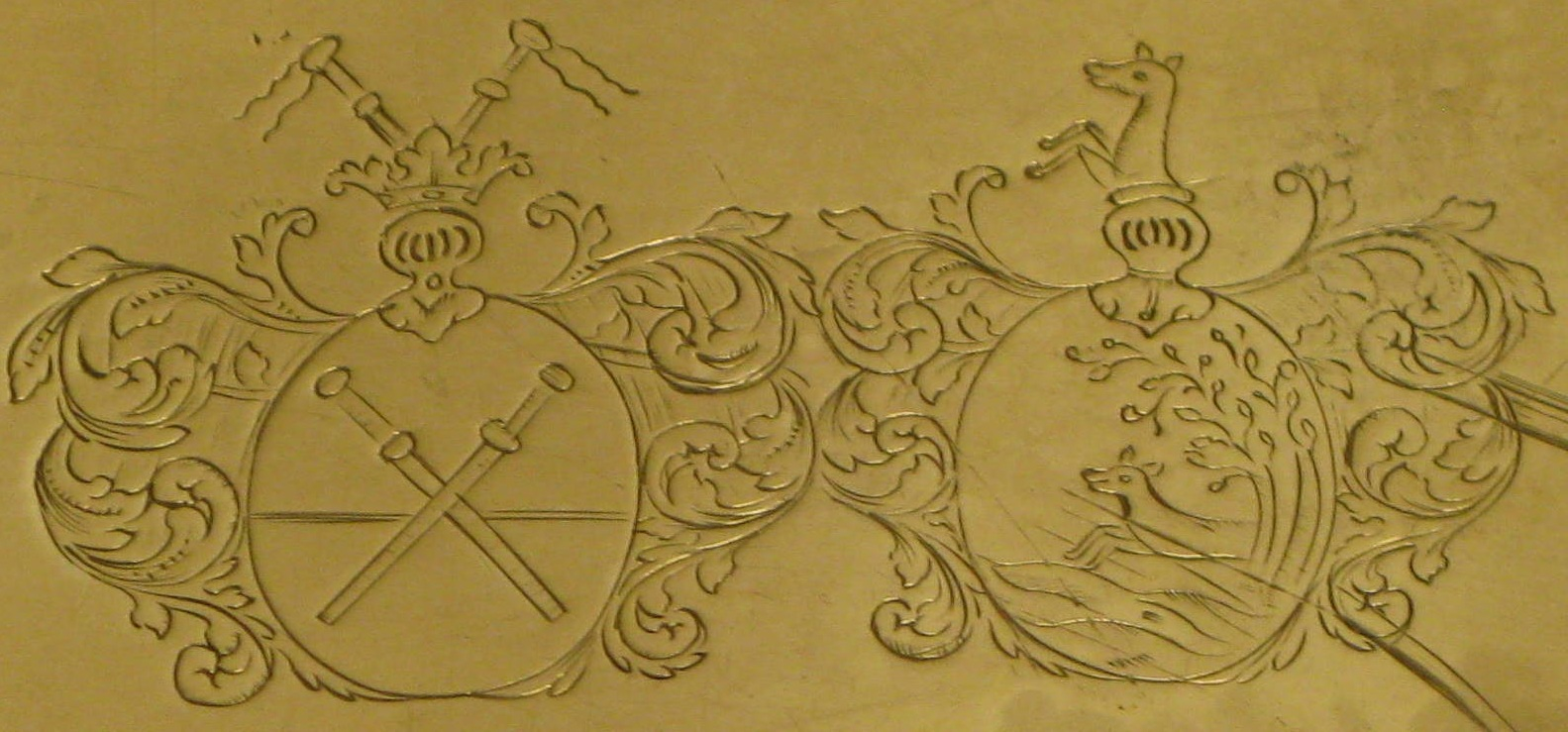
To the left, the coat of arms of Sebastiane Hansdatter Hiorth (1726–1809), who was married with Niels Jensen Mechlenborg (ca. 1715–1757). Her arms display two sticks.

Hjort, also spelled Hiort and Hiorth, is a common surname of some Norwegian and Danish families and persons. The name means hart.

== Early harts ==
- Sigurd Hart, legendary king of Ringerike
- Tore Hjort

== The Oslo harts ==
Rasmus Hjort (1525–1604), Latin Erasmus Cervinus, was a priest in Oslo. He married around 1555 Gidse Frantzdatter Berg, who was the daughter of bishop Frantz Berg and Karine Lauritzdatter. He belonged to the Oslo Humanists. The couple had the son Christoffer Hjort (1561–1616), a crypto-Catholic priest.

== The Røros harts ==
Both Peder Henningsen Hjort (1655–1716) and his son Peder Pedersen Hjort (1715–1789) were directors at Røros Copperwork.

== The harts from Jutland ==
The harts from Jutland are believed to descend from Jacob Schade (b. ca. 1540), who was from Varde in Jutland and perhaps of an old, German noble family. His son Peder Jacobsen Schade (1571–1641) in Kalundborg was the father of Søren Pedersen (Callundborg) (1607–1650). His three sons called themselves Hiort. One of his paternal grandsons, Severin Casper Hiorth (ca. 1668–1717), came to Trondheim in Norway.

== Prominent harts ==
- Alf Hjort (1877–1944), electrical engineer
- Ann Hjort (born 1956), Danish actress
- Christopher Hjort (born 1958), typographer and graphical designer
- Grethe Hjort (1903–1967), Danish-born professor of Danish and English literature, changed name to Greta Hort
- Johan Hjort (1869–1948), marine zoologist and oceanographer
- Johan Bernhard Hjort (1895–1969), supreme court lawyer
- Jonas Hjort, economist
- Nils Lid Hjort (born 1953), mathematical statistician
- Peder Pedersen Hjort (1715–1789), copperwork director
- Sara Hjort Ditlevsen (born 1988), Danish actress
- Vigdis Hjort (born 1959), novelist

== Literature and sources ==
- Wikipedia, Norwegian Bokmål & Riksmål: Hjort (slekt) (Per 10 April 2011.)
- Store norske leksikon: Hjort (Per 10 April 2011.)
- Store norske leksikon: Rasmus Hjort – utdypning (Per 10 April 2011.)
