= 1915–16 Danish National Football Tournament =

National Football Tournament Landsfodboldturneringen
- Season: 1915–16
- Champions: B.93 (1st title)

The 1915–16 Danish National Football Tournament was the third Danish football championship under the Danish Football Association.

== Provincial tournament ==
The Bornholm champion (IK Viking) did not participate for security reasons.

First round
Odense BK	9
Randers Freja	2
Frederiksborg IF	1
B 1901	3

Second round
Odense BK	2
B 1901	0

=== First round ===
Odense Boldklub	9 – 2	Randers Freja

Frederiksborg IF	1 – 3	B 1901

=== Second round ===
Odense BK	2 – 0	B 1901

== Copenhagen Championship ==
Pos	Team	Pld	W	D	L	GF	GA	GR	Pts	Qualification or relegation
1	Kjøbenhavns Boldklub	10	7	1	2	38	13	2.923	15	Qualification for Final
2	B.93	10	7	1	2	47	21	2.238	15	Qualification for Semifinal
3	AB	10	7	1	2	41	20	2.050	15	
4	Frem	10	5	1	4	23	18	1.278	11	
5	B 1903	10	2	0	8	21	52	0.404	4	
6	Østerbros BK	10	0	0	10	5	51	0.098	0	

Source: RSSSF
Rules for classification: 1) points; 2) goal ratio.

== Semifinal ==
B.93	9 – 3	Odense BK

== Final ==
B.93	3 – 2	Kjøbenhavns Boldklub
