= 1923–24 Danish National Football Tournament =

National Football Tournament Landsfodboldturneringen
- Season: 1923–24
- Champions: Boldklubben 1903

Statistics of Danish National Football Tournament in the 1923–24 season.

== Province tournament ==
=== First round ===
- IK Viking Rønne 0–1 Boldklubben 1901

=== Second round ===
- Boldklubben 1901 6–2 Holbæk IF
- Boldklubben 1913 7–1 Viborg FF

=== Third round ===
- Boldklubben 1901 1–3 Boldklubben 1913

== Copenhagen Championship ==
Pos	Team	Pld	W	D	L	GF	GA	GD	Pts
1	Boldklubben 1903	10	7	1	2	31	14	+17	15
2	Kjøbenhavns Boldklub	10	6	1	3	21	19	+2	13
3	Boldklubben af 1893	10	6	0	4	20	14	+6	12
4	Akademisk Boldklub	10	4	2	4	16	16	0	10
5	Boldklubben Frem	10	4	2	4	22	21	+1	10
6	KFUM	10	0	0	10	10	36	−26	0

== Final ==
- Boldklubben 1903 1–1 Boldklubben 1913

=== Replay 1 ===
- Boldklubben 1903 1–1 Boldklubben 1913

=== Replay 2 ===
- Boldklubben 1903 5–0 Boldklubben 1913
