= Bjarne Petersen =

Danish footballer (born 1952)

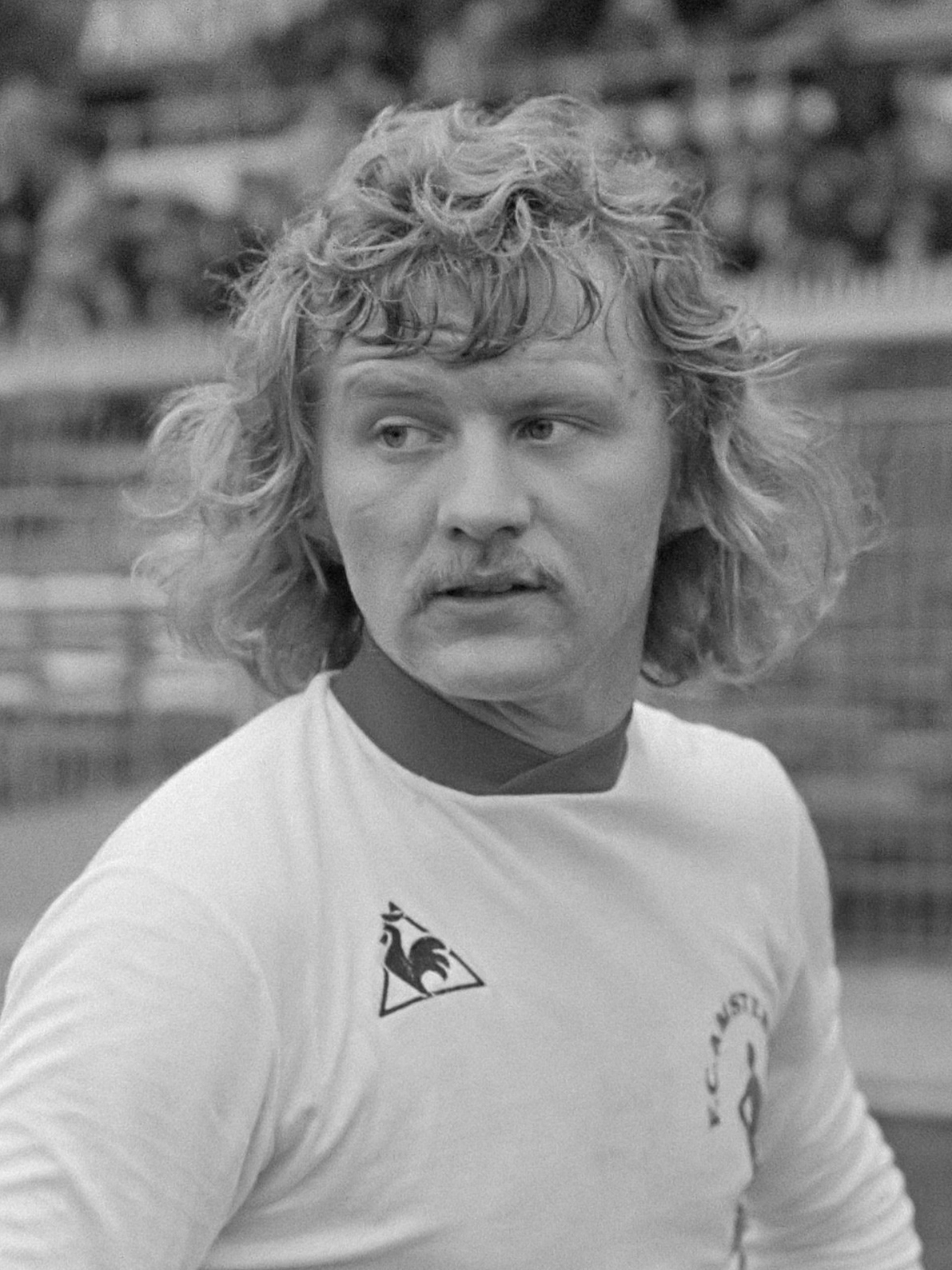
Bjarne Petersen (1975)

Bjarne Petersen (born 5 April 1952) is a Danish former football player, who was the top goalscorer of the 1975 Danish football championship while playing for Kjøbenhavns Boldklub. He played one game for the Denmark national under-21 football team.
