= 1937–38 Danish Championship League =

Danish Championship League
- Season: 1937–38
- Champions: Boldklubben 1903

Following are the statistics of the Danish Championship League in the 1937–38 season.

== Overview ==
It was contested by 10 teams, and Boldklubben 1903 won the championship.

== League standings ==
Pos	Team	Pld	W	D	L	GF	GA	GD	Pts
1	Boldklubben 1903	18	12	3	3	52	21	+31	27
2	Boldklubben Frem	18	12	3	3	50	21	+29	27
3	Kjøbenhavns Boldklub	18	9	4	5	35	29	+6	22
4	Boldklubben af 1893	18	8	3	7	37	30	+7	19
5	Akademisk Boldklub	18	7	3	8	43	39	+4	17
6	Vejen SF	18	7	2	9	36	56	−20	16
7	Aalborg Boldspilklub	18	5	5	8	44	41	+3	15
8	Aarhus Gymnastikforening	18	6	3	9	21	34	−13	15
9	Hellerup IK	18	3	6	9	27	38	−11	12
10	Esbjerg fB	18	4	2	12	18	54	−36	10
