= Ole Forsing =

Danish footballer

Ole Forsing (born 23 July 1942) is a Danish former amateur football (soccer) player, who played for B 1903 in Denmark. He was the top goalscorer of the 1970 Danish football championship. He played five games and scored one goal for the Denmark national football team.
