= Frede Jensen =

Danish footballer (1919–1970)

Frede Jensen (2 February 1919 – 8 August 1970) was a Danish amateur football (soccer) player, who played for Køge Boldklub in Denmark. He was the top goalscorer of the 1940 Danish football championship, and played one game for the Denmark national football team.
