= Svend Aage Rask =

Danish footballer (1935–2020)

Svend Aage Rask (14 July 1935 – 29 June 2020) was a Danish footballer. During his club career he played for Boldklubben 1909. He earned 1 cap for the Denmark national football team, and was in the finals squad for the 1964 European Nations' Cup.
