= Veddum =

- Village
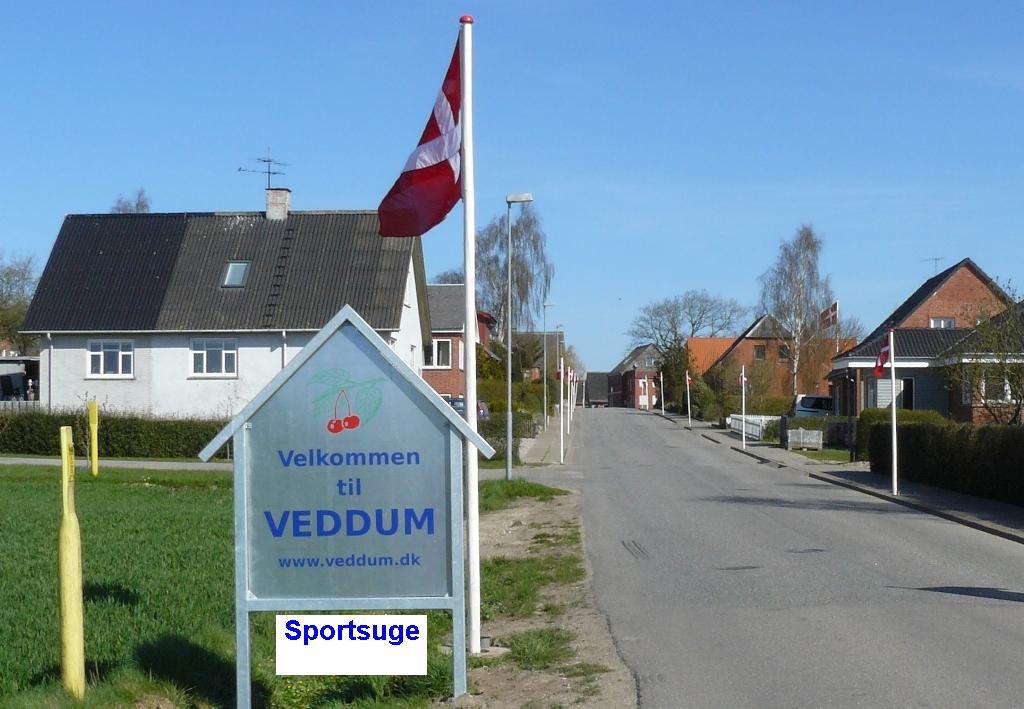
- Photograph of the entrance to Veddum in September 2009

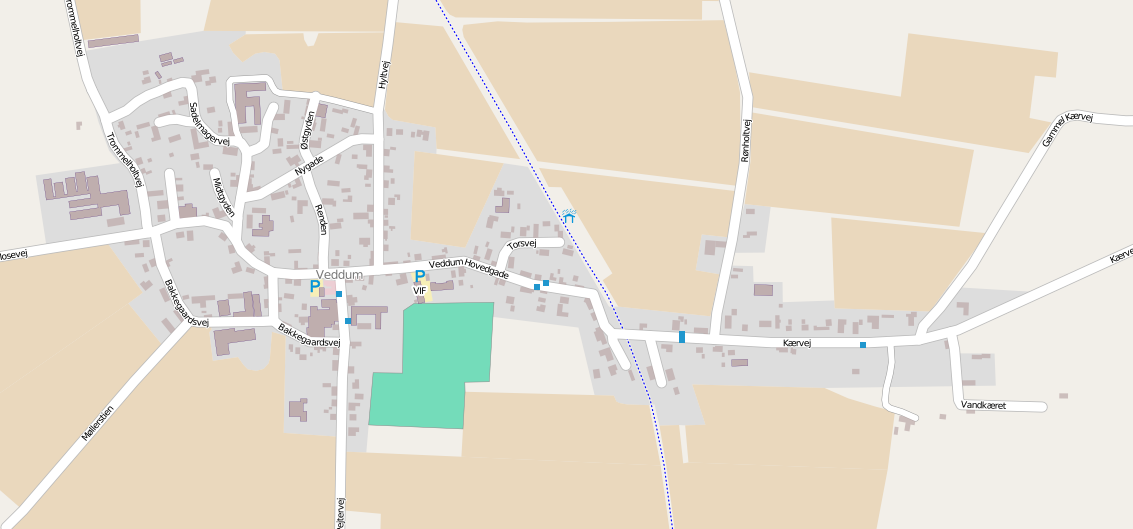
- Map of Veddum

- Map showing Veddum within Denmark
- Coordinates: 56°46′32″N 10°10′21″E
- Country: Denmark
- Region: North Jutland
- Municipality: Mariagerfjord
- Parish: Skelund

Population (2026)
  - Total: 323
- Website: veddum.dk

Veddum is a village in Mariagerfjord Municipality, in the North Jutland Region of Denmark.
