= Leif Hartwig =

Danish footballer (born 1942)

Personal information
- Date of birth: 9 November 1942 (age 83)
- Place of birth: Odense, Denmark
- Position: Defender

Senior career*
Years	Team	Apps	(Gls)
1961–1970	B909		

International career
1964–1966	Denmark	17	(0)
- * Club domestic league appearances and goals

Leif Hartwig (born 9 November 1942) is a Danish former footballer who played as a defender. He made 17 appearances for the Denmark national team from 1964 to 1966.
