= Mogensen =

Mogensen is a surname of Danish origin which may refer to:

== People ==
- Allan Mogensen, Danish orienteering competitor, winner of the 1993 World Orienteering Championship
- Andreas Mogensen (born 1976), first Dane selected as astronaut by the European Space Agency
- Annette Mogensen (born 1959), Danish footballer
- Børge Mogensen (1914–1972), Danish furniture designer
- Brock Mogensen (born 2000), American football player
- Carsten Mogensen (born 1983), male badminton player from Denmark
- Grete Mogensen, retired female badminton player from Denmark
- Gustav Mogensen (born 2001), Danish professional footballer
- Halldóra Mogensen (born 1979), Icelandic politician
- Hans Mogensen, or Mogenssøn (about 1525–1595), Danish priest
- Joëlle Mogensen (1953–1982), popular singer of French songs
- John Mogensen (1928–1977), Danish singer, songwriter and pianist
- Thomas Mogensen (born 1983), Danish team handball player

== Other ==
- Mogensen-Scott encoding, a way to embed inductive datatypes in the lambda calculus
