= Peder Hjort =

Norwegian businessman

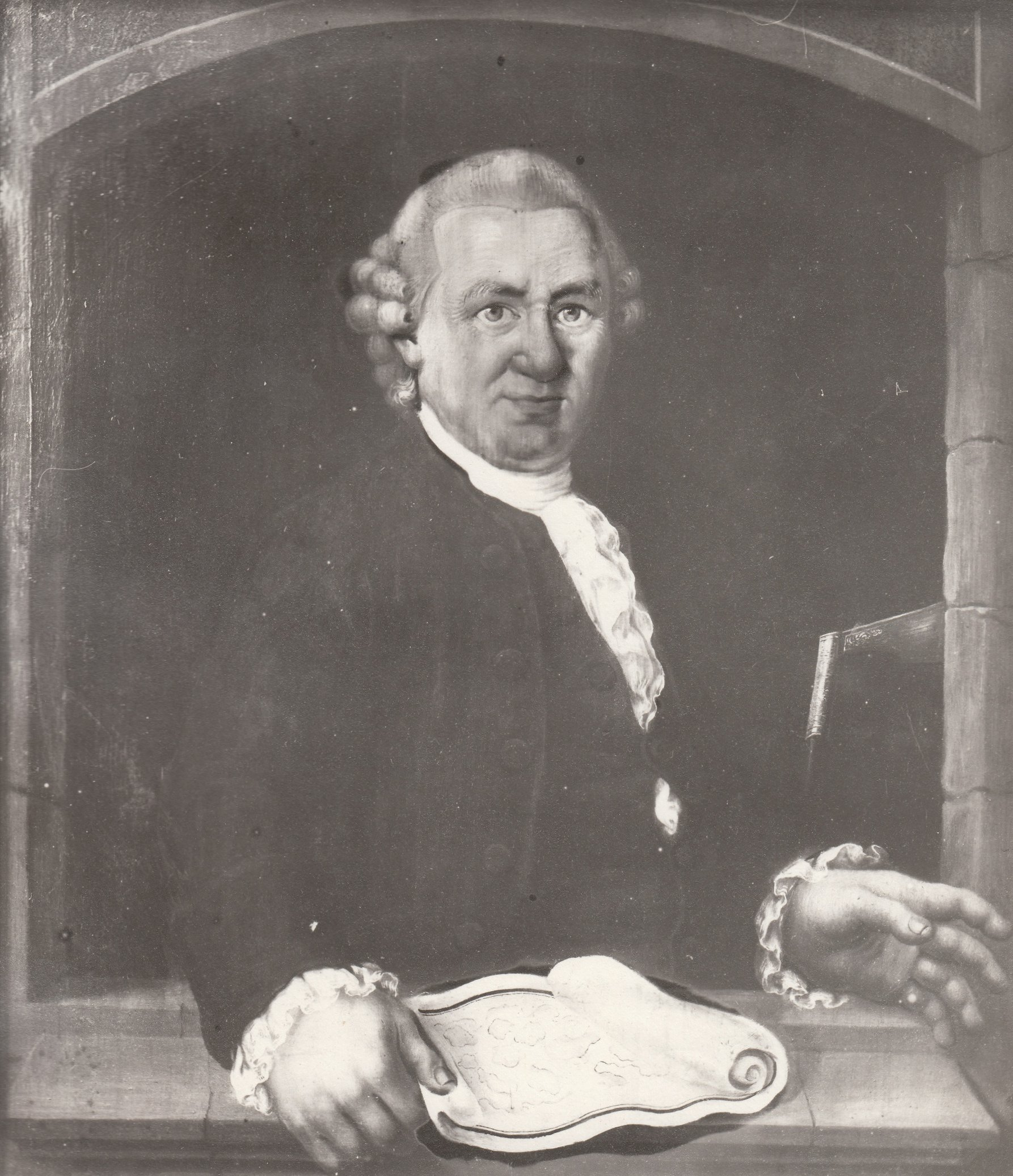
Peder Hjort

Peder Julius Nicolas Hjort or Peder Hiort (1715 – 1 August 1789) was a Norwegian businessperson.

Peder Julius Nicolas Hjort was born in the mining town of Røros in Søndre Trondhjem county as the youngest of six children. His family originated in Schleswig-Flensburg. He attended the Trondheim Cathedral School and was trained at the University of Copenhagen as a theologian graduating in 1737.

In 1743, he was appointed to a position with the Copper Works at Røros. In 1762, he assumed the position of magistrate, which his father held before him. He also became assistant mining director followed in 1772 as director of the mines. At that time, this was one of the most valuable mines in Norway. The operation consisted of several mines and smelters. In 1768, he became a member of Royal Norwegian Society of Sciences and Letters after he had authored Historiske Efterretninger om Røros Kobberverk, a report about the history of the Røros copper plant.
