= 1916–17 Danish National Football Tournament =

National Football Tournament Landsfodboldturneringen
- Season: 1916–17
- Champions: Kjøbenhavns Boldklub (3rd title)

Statistics of Danish National Football Tournament in the 1916/1917 season.

== Province tournament ==
=== First round ===
- Odense Boldklub 3-2 Vejen SF
- Boldklubben 1901 1-0 Frederiksborg IF

=== Second round ===
- Odense Boldklub 2-3 Boldklubben 1901

== Copenhagen Championship ==
Pos	Team	Pld	W	D	L	GF	GA	GD	Pts
1	Kjøbenhavns Boldklub	10	7	1	2	33	14	+19	15
2	Akademisk Boldklub	10	5	3	2	25	22	+3	13
3	Boldklubben af 1893	10	5	2	3	33	20	+13	12
4	Boldklubben 1903	10	4	3	3	29	27	+2	11
5	Boldklubben Frem	10	2	2	6	15	22	−7	6
6	Boldklubben Velo	10	0	3	7	15	45	−30	3

== Semifinal ==
- Kjøbenhavns Boldklub 4-0 Boldklubben 1901

== Final ==
- Kjøbenhavns Boldklub 6-2 Akademisk Boldklub
