= Walter Presch =

Austrian footballer (1910–1991)

Personal information
- Date of birth: 5 August 1910
- Place of birth: Vienna, Austria-Hungary
- Date of death: 13 March 1991 (aged 80)
- Place of death: Strasbourg, France
- Position: Striker

Senior career*
Years	Team	Apps	(Gls)
1929–1930	First Vienna		
1930–1931	Cantonal Neuchâtel		
1931–1932	Young Fellows		
1932–1933	Hyères		
1933–1934	Strasbourg	25	(13)
1934–1936	Olympique Lillois	3	(2)
1936–1937	Sète	10	(2)
1937–1938	Red Star		
1938–1939	Cannes		
1945–1946	Strasbourg		

Managerial career
- 1951–1953: Aarau
- 1953–1956: B 1909
- 1956–1957: Viborg FF
- 1957–1960: Lausanne
- 1960–1961: Young Fellows
- 1962–1963: Biel-Bienne
- 1964–1966: KB
- 1966–1967: Strasbourg
- * Club domestic league appearances and goals

Walter Presch (5 August 1910 – 13 March 1991) was an Austrian football player and manager.

== Playing career ==
Presch spent his career in Austria, Switzerland and France.

== Managerial career ==
Presch coached Aarau, B 1909, Angers, Viborg FF Lausanne, Young Fellows, Biel-Bienne, KB and Strasbourg.
