= 1924–25 Danish National Football Tournament =

National Football Tournament Landsfodboldturneringen
- Season: 1924–25
- Champions: Kjøbenhavns Boldklub

Statistics of Danish National Football Tournament in the 1924/1925 season.

== Province tournament ==
=== First round ===
- IK Viking Rønne 2-6 Boldklubben 1901

=== Second round ===
- Boldklubben 1901 3-1 Korsør Boldklub
- Odense Boldklub 3-4 Aarhus Gymnastikforening

=== Third round ===
- Boldklubben 1901 1-4 Aarhus Gymnastikforening

== Copenhagen Championship ==
Pos	Team	Pld	W	D	L	GF	GA	GD	Pts
1	Kjøbenhavns Boldklub	10	9	0	1	33	11	+22	18
2	Akademisk Boldklub	10	5	2	3	26	19	+7	12
3	Boldklubben af 1893	10	4	2	4	24	18	+6	10
4	Boldklubben 1903	10	4	2	4	23	17	+6	10
5	Boldklubben Frem	10	3	1	6	13	24	−11	7
6	KFUMs Boldklub	10	0	3	7	10	40	−30	3

== Final ==
- Kjøbenhavns Boldklub 9-2 Aarhus Gymnastikforening
