= Jørgen Ravn =

Danish footballer (1940–2015)

Personal information
- Full name: Jørgen Ravn
- Date of birth: 3 June 1940
- Place of birth: Denmark
- Date of death: 4 June 2015 (aged 75)
- Place of death: Denmark
- Height: 6 ft 1 in (1.85 m)
- Position: Striker

Senior career*
Years	Team	Apps	(Gls)
1960–1964	KB Copenhagen	??	(??)
1965–1966	Aberdeen	25	(9)
	KB Copenhagen	??	(??)

International career^{‡}
1960–1962	Denmark U21	10	(5)
- * Club domestic league appearances and goals as of 6 June 2015 ‡ National team caps and goals as of 6 June 2015

Jørgen Ravn (3 June 1940 – 4 June 2015), alternatively spelled Jørn Ravn, was a Danish football player.

== Club career ==
He played as an amateur for Kjøbenhavns Boldklub (KB) in Denmark, and became topscorer in the 1st Division in 1961 and 1964. He moved abroad to play professionally for Aberdeen in Scotland in 1965, after being signed by Tommy Pearson alongside his compatriots Jens Petersen and Leif Mortensen.

One and a half years later he returned to his native country. After a two-year penalty for having played as a professional (mandatory in these years' Danish football), he continued to play for KB some years.

== International career ==
He got 10 caps and scored five goals for the Denmark national under-21 football team. He also played once for his country's B-squad.

== Personal life and death ==
Married to Inger, Ravn worked for over 25 years for Tuborg. He died on 4 June 2015, one day after his 75th birthday.

== Career statistics ==
Club	Season	League			Scottish Cup		League Cup		Total	
Club	Season	Division	Apps	Goals	Apps	Goals	Apps	Goals	Apps	Goals
Aberdeen	1964-65	Scottish Division One	12	6	2	0	0	0	14	6
Aberdeen	1965-66	Scottish Division One	13	3	5	2	1	1	19	6
Aberdeen	Total		25	9	7	2	1	1	33	12
