= Bruno Eliasen =

Danish footballer (1933-1995)

Personal information
- Date of birth: 11 July 1933
- Place of birth: Odense, Denmark
- Date of death: 11 September 1995 (aged 62)
- Position: Midfielder

International career
| Years | Team | Apps | (Gls) |
| 1958–1963 | Denmark | 3 | (0) |

Bruno Eliasen (11 July 1933 – 11 September 1995) was a Danish footballer. He played in three matches for the Denmark national football team from 1958 to 1963.
