= 2021 Mariagerfjord municipal election =

- 16 November 2021

All 29 seats to the Mariagerfjord Municipal Council 15 seats needed for a majority
- Turnout: 22,676 (67.9%) ▼3.2pp
	First party	Second party	Third party
	A	V	C
Party	Social Democrats	Venstre	Conservatives
Last election	18 seats, 59.7%	12 seats, 35.6%	1 seat, 3.3%
Seats won	11	11	3
Seat change	0	▼1	▲2
Popular vote	8,241	7,238	2,577
Percentage	36.8%	35.6%	11.5%
Swing	▲0.1%	▼2.3%	▲8.4%
	Fourth party	Fifth party	Sixth party
	O	D	Ø
Party	Danish People's Party	New Right	Red–Green Alliance
Last election	3 seats, 11.2%	Did not stand	0 seats, 2.2%
Seats won	1	1	1
Seat change	▼2	▲1	▲1
Popular vote	1,020	757	691
Percentage	4.6%	3.4%	3.1%
Swing	▼6.6%	New	▲0.9%
	Seventh party	Eighth party
	F	B
Party	Green Left	Social Liberals
Last election	0 seats, 3.0%	1 seat, 2.8%
Seats won	1	0
Seat change	0	▼1
Popular vote	686	478
Percentage	3.1%	2.1%
Swing	▲0.1%	▼0.7%
Mayor before election
Mogens Jespersen
Venstre
Mayor after election
Mogens Jespersen
Venstre

Mogens Jespersen from Venstre was seeking a 3rd consecutive term as mayor of Mariagerfjord Municipality for this election.

The traditional blue bloc had won 16 seats in the previous election. In the election result Venstre would lose the position as the single largest party in the municipal council. They would instead become the joint biggest party with Social Democrats. However, while the traditional blue bloc parties would lose 3 seats, they would also gain 3 seats, resulting in 16 blue seats again. This meant that Mogens Jespersen looked to able to continue as mayor. It was eventually confirmed.

The constitution that would give him a 3rd term, was announced on December 10, 2021.

== Electoral system ==
For elections to Danish municipalities, a number varying from 9 to 31 are chosen to be elected to the municipal council. The seats are then allocated using the D'Hondt method and a closed list proportional representation. Mariagerfjord Municipality had 29 seats in 2021

Unlike in Danish General Elections, in elections to municipal councils, electoral alliances are allowed.

== Electoral alliances ==
=== Electoral Alliance 1 ===
Party		Political alignment
B	Social Liberals	Centre to Centre-left
F	Green Left	Centre-left to Left-wing
Ø	Red–Green Alliance	Left-wing to Far-Left

=== Electoral Alliance 2 ===
Party		Political alignment
C	Conservatives	Centre-right
D	New Right	Right-wing to Far-right
K	Christian Democrats	Centre to Centre-right
M	Mariagerfjordlisten	Local politics
O	Danish People's Party	Right-wing to Far-right
V	Venstre	Centre-right

== Results by polling station ==
Polling Station	A	B	C	D	F	K	M	O	V	Ø
Polling Station	%	%	%	%	%	%	%	%	%	%
Assens, Mariagerfjord	35.2	1.1	17.4	4.7	6.4	0.4	1.6	4.7	26.2	2.1
Mariager	32.0	1.1	24.1	3.0	6.1	0.7	2.0	6.0	22.3	2.6
Arden	49.2	1.5	5.0	3.2	2.0	0.2	1.1	3.4	32.0	2.4
Valsgård	34.2	3.0	8.9	4.2	1.5	0.6	2.7	4.6	37.0	3.3
Vebbestrup	28.6	1.5	5.4	7.2	2.1	0.3	2.0	7.1	43.0	2.8
Hadsund	35.0	1.7	8.9	3.0	1.8	0.3	3.8	3.6	39.7	2.1
Veddum-Skelund	44.3	0.5	6.3	2.8	1.4	0.5	1.4	3.5	36.0	3.3
Als	34.2	0.3	6.1	2.2	1.6	0.4	1.4	2.4	50.0	1.4
Hørby	31.8	2.9	12.0	4.2	3.3	0.8	4.5	4.5	33.7	2.4
Onsild	27.9	2.1	11.4	4.6	4.4	0.8	3.4	8.2	33.8	3.4
Hobro	41.4	3.6	13.0	2.4	3.1	0.6	2.5	4.4	23.9	5.0

== Results ==
Party		Votes	%	+/-	Seats	+/-
Mariagerfjord Municipality
A	Social Democrats	8,241	36.81	+0.09	11	0
V	Venstre	7,238	32.33	-3.29	11	-1
C	Conservatives	2,577	11.51	+8.41	3	+2
O	Danish People's Party	1,020	4.56	-6.63	1	-2
D	New Right	757	3.38	New	1	New
Ø	Red-Green Alliance	691	3.09	+0.84	1	+1
F	Green Left	686	3.06	+0.05	1	0
M	Mariagerfjordlisten	583	2.60	New	0	New
B	Social Liberals	478	2.14	-0.69	0	-1
K	Christian Democrats	114	0.51	-0.36	0	0
Total		22,385	100	N/A	29	N/A
Invalid votes		72	0.21	+0.01		
Blank votes		219	0.65	-0.22		
Turnout		22,676	67.69	-3.42		
Source: valg.dk
