= 1917–18 Danish National Football Tournament =

National Football Tournament Landsfodboldturneringen
- Season: 1917–18
- Champions: Kjøbenhavns Boldklub

Statistics of Danish 1st Division in the 1917/1918 season.

== Province tournament ==
=== First round ===
- Frederiksborg IF 3-1 Boldklubben 1901
- Odense Boldklub 1-3 Randers Sportsklub Freja

=== Final ===
- Frederiksborg IF 0-1 Randers Sportsklub Freja

== Copenhagen Championship ==
Pos	Team	Pld	W	D	L	GF	GA	GD	Pts
1	Kjøbenhavns Boldklub	10	8	1	1	46	14	+32	17
2	Boldklubben Frem	10	5	2	3	32	21	+11	12
3	Boldklubben af 1893	10	4	3	3	31	18	+13	11
4	Boldklubben 1903	10	4	2	4	22	24	−2	10
5	Akademisk Boldklub	10	4	1	5	27	21	+6	9
6	Boldklubben Velo	10	0	1	9	9	69	−60	1

== Final ==
- Kjøbenhavns Boldklub 5-2 Randers Sportsklub Freja
