= 1913–14 Danish National Football Tournament =

National Football Tournament Landsfodboldturneringen
- Season: 1913–14
- Champions: Kjøbenhavns Boldklub (2nd title)

The 1913–14 Danish National Football Tournament was the second Danish championship under the Danish Football Association.

== Format ==
The format changed slightly from the last season, now only giving the winner of the provincial tournament a semi-final match against the second place finisher in the Copenhagen Championship.

== Province tournament ==
First round
Vejle Boldklub (JBU)	2
B 1901 (LFBU)	0

Second round
Vejle Boldklub (JBU)	4
BK Union (FBU)	2
Rønne BK (BBU)	5
Frederiksborg IF (SBU)	2

Third round
Vejle Boldklub (JBU)	2
Rønne BK (BBU)	1

=== First round ===
Vejle Boldklub	2 – 0	Boldklubben 1901

=== Second round ===
BK Union	2 – 4	Vejle Boldklub

Rønne BK	5 – 2	Frederiksborg IF

=== Third round ===
Vejle Boldklub	2 – 1	Rønne BK

== Copenhagen Championship ==
Pos	Team	Pld	W	D	L	GF	GA	GR	Pts	Qualification or relegation
1	Kjøbenhavns Boldklub (A)	10	8	2	0	36	13	2.769	18	Qualification for Final
2	B.93 (A)	10	5	2	3	29	15	1.933	12	Qualification for Semifinal
3	Frem	10	5	2	3	29	15	1.933	12	
4	AB	10	3	3	4	19	36	0.528	9	
5	Østerbros BK	10	2	1	7	16	50	0.320	5	
6	B 1903	10	1	1	8	9	39	0.231	3	

Source: RSSSF
Rules for classification: 1st points. Additional tiebreakers unknown
(A) Advance to a further round

== Semifinal ==
Vejle Boldklub	0 – 3	B.93

== Final ==
Kjøbenhavns Boldklub	4 – 2	B.93
