= Mogens Jespersen =

Danish footballer (born 1949)

Mogens Jespersen (born 9 April 1949) is a Danish former football (soccer) player, who played 165 games and scored 55 goals for Aalborg Boldspilklub. He was the top goalscorer of the 1976 Danish football championship.
