= 1912–13 Danish National Football Tournament =

National Football Tournament Landsfodboldturneringen
- Season: 1912–13
- Champions: Kjøbenhavns Boldklub (1st title)

The 1912–13 Danish National Football Tournament was the first Danish championship under the Danish Football Association.

== Format ==
The five provincial unions (covering Bornholm, Funen, Jutland, Lolland-Falster and Zealand) each had separate tournaments. The winners of these entered the provincial tournament for a place in the final against the winner of the Copenhagen Championship for the first Danish football championship.

== Province tournament ==
First round
Frederiksborg IF (SBU)	2
Rønne BK (BBU)	1

Second round
Vejle Boldklub (JBU)	1
Boldklubben 1901 (LFBU)	5
Boldklubben 1909 (FBU)	0
Frederiksborg IF (SBU)	2

Third round
Boldklubben 1901 (LFBU)	6
Frederiksborg IF (SBU)	2

=== First round ===
Frederiksborg IF	2 – 1	Rønne BK

=== Second round ===
Boldklubben 1909	0 – 2	Frederiksborg IF

Vejle Boldklub	1 – 5	B 1901

=== Third round ===
Boldklubben 1901	6 – 2	Frederiksborg IF

== Copenhagen Championship ==
Pos	Team	Pld	W	D	L	GF	GA	GR	Pts	Qualification or relegation
1	Kjøbenhavns Boldklub (A)	10	8	1	1	45	10	4.500	17	Qualification for Final
2	B.93	10	6	2	2	37	20	1.850	14	
3	Frem	10	3	4	3	16	14	1.143	10	
4	B 1903	10	3	3	4	19	36	0.528	9	
5	AB	10	2	4	4	29	35	0.829	8	
6	Velo	10	0	2	8	17	48	0.354	2	

Source: RSSSF
Rules for classification: 1st points. Additional tiebreakers unknown
(A) Advance to a further round

== Final ==
Kjøbenhavns Boldklub	6 – 2	Boldklubben 1901
