= 1921–22 Danish National Football Tournament =

National Football Tournament Landsfodboldturneringen
- Season: 1921–22
- Champions: Kjøbenhavns Boldklub

Statistics of Danish National Football Tournament in the 1921/1922 season.

== Province tournament ==
=== First round ===
- IK Viking Rønne 0-5 Skovshoved IF

=== Second round ===
- Skovshoved IF 2-3 Boldklubben 1901
- Boldklubben 1909 2-5 Aarhus Gymnastikforening (aet)

=== Third round ===
- Boldklubben 1901 2-1 Aarhus Gymnastikforening

== Copenhagen Championship ==
Pos	Team	Pld	W	D	L	GF	GA	GD	Pts
1	Kjøbenhavns Boldklub	8	6	2	0	12	6	+6	14
2	Boldklubben Frem	8	3	2	3	7	13	−6	8
3	Boldklubben 1903	8	3	2	3	10	6	+4	8
4	Boldklubben af 1893	8	3	1	4	15	10	+5	7
5	Akademisk Boldklub	8	1	1	6	9	18	−9	3

== Final ==
- Kjøbenhavns Boldklub 4-2 Boldklubben 1901
