= Mogens Haastrup =

Danish footballer (born 1939)

Mogens Haastrup (born 28 June 1939) is a Danish former amateur football (soccer) player, who played for Svendborg fB and B 1909 in Denmark. He was the top goalscorer of the 1963 Danish football championship. He played two games for the Denmark national football team.
