= 1945–46 Danish 1st Division =

1st season of Danish 1st Division

Danish 1st Division
- Season: 1945–46

The 1945–46 Danish 1st Division season was the inaugural edition of Danish 1st Division annual football competition in Denmark. It was contested by 10 teams

Boldklubben af 1893 successfully pursued its 1946 title.

Statistics of Danish 1st Division in the 1945/1946 season.

== League standings ==
Pos	Team	Pld	W	D	L	GF	GA	GD	Pts
1	Boldklubben af 1893	18	13	2	3	61	29	+32	28
2	Kjøbenhavns Boldklub	18	11	2	5	48	22	+26	24
3	Akademisk Boldklub	18	8	5	5	42	33	+9	21
4	Boldklubben Frem	18	8	2	8	41	37	+4	18
5	Fremad Amager	18	6	5	7	27	37	−10	17
6	Boldklubben 1903	18	6	4	8	31	34	−3	16
7	Køge BK	18	6	3	9	35	48	−13	15
8	Aarhus Gymnastikforening	18	6	2	10	26	42	−16	14
9	Aalborg Boldspilklub	18	6	2	10	19	38	−19	14
10	Boldklubben 1909	18	4	5	9	27	37	−10	13

== Results ==
Home \ Away	ABK	AaB	AGF	B93	B03	B09	BKF	AMA	KB	KBK
Akademisk BK	—	5–1	4–0	1–0	3–1	2–1	1–3	5–4	2–4	7–2
Aalborg BK	2–1	—	3–1	2–0	3–2	0–2	1–1	0–2	0–2	0–2
Aarhus GF	2–3	1–0	—	0–9	1–2	3–3	2–1	1–2	1–0	2–3
B.93	2–2	4–0	4–2	—	1–0	6–2	5–3	4–2	3–3	6–4
B 1903	4–0	4–1	1–3	0–3	—	2–2	2–4	1–1	2–0	2–2
B 1909	0–0	1–1	2–1	2–3	1–3	—	2–0	1–2	0–2	1–2
BK Frem	2–1	1–3	0–1	0–4	4–0	5–2	—	3–0	4–8	4–0
Fremad Amager	1–1	1–0	2–2	0–2	2–2	1–2	1–1	—	0–6	3–1
Kjøbenhavns BK	2–2	7–0	1–0	4–0	2–1	2–1	4–1	0–1	—	1–3
Køge BK	2–2	1–2	2–3	2–5	1–2	2–2	0–4	5–2	1–0	—

Legend: Blue = home team win; Yellow = draw; Red = away team win.
