= Boldklubben af 1893 =

Association football club in Copenhagen, Denmark

B.93
- Full name: Boldklubben af 1893
- Nickname: Byens Ægte Hold (The True City Team)
- Short name: B.93
- Founded: 19 May 1893; 133 years ago
- Ground: Østerbro Stadion, Copenhagen
- Capacity: 7,000
- Chairman: Hans Drachmann
- Manager: Anders Stisen; Jimmi Klitland
- League: 2nd Division
- 2025–26: 1st Division, 11th of 12 (relegated)
- Website: b93.dk
Home colours	Away colours

Boldklubben af 1893, commonly referred to as B.93, is a football club based in Østerbro, Copenhagen, Denmark. The team competes in the Danish 2nd Division, the third level of the Danish football league system. The club has won nine league titles and one Danish Cup.

B.93 was originally founded as a cricket club on 19 May 1893, and was named Cricketklubben af 1893 at its inception. Football was introduced in 1896, at which point the club adopted its current name. Tennis was added in 1901. The cricket division was later discontinued, but the football and tennis divisions remain among the country's larger clubs by membership.

The club's football division, with 1,834 members, was the fifth-largest football club under DBU Copenhagen in Denmark in 2023.

== History ==
Founded in 1893 as a cricket club, B.93 began playing football in 1895 and entered DBU's first-team tournament in 1896, marking the beginning of its official football history. The club participated continuously in the top league from the start of the Denmark tournament in 1927 until 1954, when it was relegated to the 2nd Division. B.93 enjoyed its most successful period during the 1930s, earning the nickname Champagneholdet ("The Champagne Team") and winning five Danish championships.

B.93 experienced a notable decline in prominence from the mid-20th century. The club's most recent stint in the top league was during the 1998–99 season. Prior to that, B.93 had played in the top league uninterrupted from 1975 to 1983. A highlight of this period was in 1982, when B.93 reached the Danish Cup final. The club defeated B 1903 over two legs at Københavns Idrætspark, with the first match ending 3–3 after extra time and the replay won 1–0. This victory secured B.93 a place in the UEFA Cup Winners' Cup, where the club eliminated East German club Dynamo Dresden in the first round but was subsequently defeated by Belgium's Waterschei Thor in the second round.

The early 2000s were marked by financial difficulties for B.93. In February 2002, the club faced a bankruptcy crisis, which was averted when IT millionaire Thomas Olsen and former Denmark international Preben Elkjær took over the professional company B.93 Copenhagen A/S. However, the partnership ended in June 2004, leading to a decline in the club's performance and relegation from the second tier in 2005. The decline continued, and in 2012, B.93 were relegated from the 2nd Division East, falling outside divisional football for the first time in its history. Despite this setback, the club was promoted from the Denmark Series the following year and has remained a divisional team since.

=== Achievements ===
- 35 seasons in the Highest Danish League
- 28 seasons in the Second Highest Danish League
- 11 seasons in the Third Highest Danish League

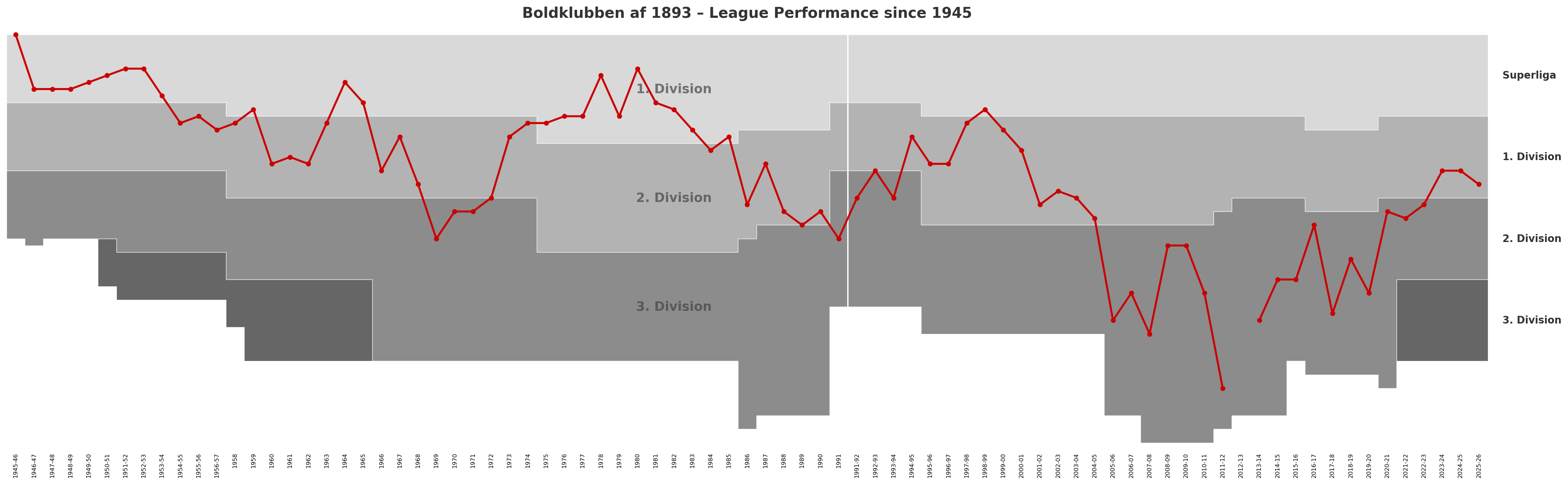
B.93's league position since 1945

== Players ==
=== Current squad ===
As of 6 September 2026

Note: Flags indicate national team as defined under FIFA eligibility rules; some limited exceptions apply. Players may hold more than one non-FIFA nationality.

No.	Pos.	Nation	Player
2	DF	DEN	Ludvig Fagersted
3	DF	DEN	Nicklas Mouritsen
4	DF	DEN	Simon Wæver
5	DF	DEN	Emil Christensen
6	MF	DEN	Mikkel Wohlgemuth
7	FW	DEN	Mads Abrahamsen
9	FW	DEN	Julius Voldby
11	FW	DEN	Jeffrey Papa
12	DF	DEN	Valdemar Lykke
13	FW	DEN	Vincent Abildgaard
14	FW	DEN	Lulian Jakupi
15	DF	DEN	Kristian Pedersen
16	MF	DEN	Tobias Blidegn
17	FW	DEN	Yasin Belhadj

No.	Pos.	Nation	Player
18	DF	DEN	Christoffer Henriksen
19	DF	GHA	Joseph Kinful
20	DF	DEN	Andreas Heimer (captain)
21	FW	DEN	Sebastian Koch
22	MF	DEN	Sven Leschly
24	DF	DEN	Emil Møller
25	GK	DEN	Julius Christensen
26	MF	DEN	Danis Faljic
29	DF	DEN	Karl Noppen
30	MF	DEN	Vito Hammershøy-Mistrati
31	GK	DEN	Frederik Ibsen
33	MF	DEN	Patrick Olsen
90	FW	LBN	Bassel Jradi

=== Youth players in use 2026–27 ===
Note: Flags indicate national team as defined under FIFA eligibility rules; some limited exceptions apply. Players may hold more than one non-FIFA nationality.

No.	Pos.	Nation	Player

=== Out on loan ===
Note: Flags indicate national team as defined under FIFA eligibility rules; some limited exceptions apply. Players may hold more than one non-FIFA nationality.

No.	Pos.	Nation	Player
1	GK	DEN	Aris Vaporakis (at Rosengård 1917 until 31 December 2026)
—	FW	LAT	Kristaps Grabovskis (at Dila until 30 June 2027)

== Staff ==
=== Current technical staff ===
Position	Staff
Head Coach	(Denmark) Kasper Lorentzen
Assistant Coach	(Denmark) Emil Dyre
Assistant Coach	(Denmark) Jimmi Klitland
Goalkeeping Coach	(Denmark) Kevin Stuhr Ellegaard
Goalkeeping Coach	(Denmark) Nicolas Nielsen
Physical Coach	(Denmark) Jonas Ratze
Sport Director	(Denmark) Lars Lüthjohan

Last updated: 25 January 2025
Source: F.C. Copenhagen

== Honours ==
Original logo

- Danish Football Championship (Level 1) (Note: Until 1991, the top division of Danish football was the Danish 1st Division; since then, it has been the Danish Superliga. At the same time, the Danish 1st Division became the second division, and so on.)
  - Winners (9): 1915–16, 1926–27, 1928–29, 1929–30, 1933–34, 1934–35, 1938–39, 1941–42, 1945–46
  - Runners-up (2): 1913–14, 1932–33,
- 2nd Division (1945–1990) / 1st Division (1991–present) (Level 2)
  - Winners (1): Spring 1994
  - Runners-up (5): 1958, 1963, 1974, 1984, 1997–98
- 3rd Division East (1945–1990) / 2nd Division (1991–present) (Level 3)
  - Winners (5): 1972, 1989, 1991–92 slutspil (Note: In the summer of 1991, one of the several changes to the format of the Danmarksturneringen i fodbold was the introduction of the Kvalifikationsligaen in the spring section of the season, which meant that the levels below in the overall Danish football league system was dropped by one, while at the same time being increased by one in the autumn season. This tournament format lasted until the spring of 1995.), 1992–93 grundspil, 1993–94 grundspil
  - Runners-up (6): 1970, 1971, 2008–09, 2009–10, 2020–21, 2022–23
- Danish Cup
  - Winners (1): 1981–82
