= Boldklubben 1903 =

Defunct Danish football club

B 1903
- Full name: Boldklubben 1903
- Nickname: 3'erne
- Founded: 1903; 122 years ago
- Ground: Gentofte Sportspark
- Chairman: Benny Olsen
- Manager: Lars Dalsborg
- League: Denmark Series
- Website: https://www.b1903.dk/
Home colours	Away colours

Boldklubben 1903 or B 1903 is a football club founded on 2 June 1903, located in Copenhagen, Denmark. Seven times winner of the Danish championship (introduced 1913) in 1920, 1924, 1926, 1938, 1969, 1970 and 1976 and twice winner of the Danish Cup (introduced 1955) in 1979 and 1986. Best international result: Quarter final in the 1991–92 UEFA Cup after eliminating Aberdeen F.C., Bayern Munich (6–2 and 0–1) and Trabzonspor. In 1992 the club was merged with Kjøbenhavns Boldklub (KB) to form the current club F.C. Copenhagen to which Boldklubben 1903 transferred its license to play in the Danish league. As a note, F.C. Copenhagen won the Danish championship in its first season.

== Achievements ==
- Danish Championship
  - Winners (7): 1920, 1924, 1926, 1938, 1969, 1970, 1976
- Danish Cup
  - Winners (2): 1978–79, 1985–86
  - Runners-up (2): 1981–82, 1991–92

Participation overview

- 55 seasons in the Highest Danish League
- 3 seasons in the Second Highest Danish League
