= 1990–91 Danish Cup =

Tournament details
- Country: Denmark

Final positions
- Champions: Odense BK
- Runners-up: AaB Fodbold

The 1990–91 Danish Cup was the 37th season of the Danish Cup, the highest football competition in Denmark. The original match of the final was played on 9 May and the replay was played on 14 June 1991.

== First round ==
Team 1	Score	Team 2
Albertslund IF	1–4	Helsingør IF
Assens FC	0–3	Nørresundby BK
Asaa BK	3–1	IK Skovbakken
B 1901	0–2	ØB
Ballerup IF	3–0	Lundtofte BK
IF Skjold Birkerød	3–1	B.93
Bramming BK	5–2 (a.e.t.)	Hammel GF
Dragør BK	1–2 (a.e.t.)	Brønshøj BK
Frederiksberg BK	0–1	BK Avarta
Frederikssund IK	0–2	Greve IF
BK Fremad Valby	2–3	FIF Hillerød
Glostrup IC	1–4	AB
Haderslev FK	4–3	B 52/Aalborg FC
Herning Fremad	3–2	Struer BK
Hellerup IK	5–0	Valby BK
Hjørring IF	0–2	B 1913
Hobro IK	2–0	Svendborg fB
Holstebro BK	5–1	Dalum IF
Horsens fS	0–4	Esbjerg fB
Hvidovre IF	5–1	B 1921
Haarby BK	1–4	Aalborg Chang
Kolding IF	1–2	Fredericia KFUM
Lindholm IF	1–6	Odense Kammeraternes SK
Nørre Aaby IK	3–2	Slagelse B&I
Randers Freja	1–1 (a.e.t.) (0–3 p)	Egebjerg IF
Ringsted IF	3–2	Lillerød IF
Roskilde BK	3–1	Holbæk B&I
Rødby fB	0–1	Fremad Amager
Skamby BK	2–4	Brande IF
Skovshoved IF	0–3	Glostrup IF 32
Spjald IF	2–4	Varde IF
Stubbekøbing BK	1–3	Kastrup BK
Sønderborg BK	3–1	Korsør BK
Ulbjerg IF	2–5	B 1909 Odense
Vanløse IF	2–1	Køge BK
IK Viking Rønne	1–2	Tårnby BK
Vordingborg IF	9–3	Ryvang FC
Ølstykke FC	8–1	Sorø IF Freja
Aabenraa BK	6–2	Odense KFUM
Aabyhøj IF	4–2	Thisted FC

== Second round ==
Team 1	Score	Team 2
AB	1–0	Hellerup IK
B 1913	1–1 (a.e.t.) (5–4 p)	B 1909
Ballerup IF	3–2	Fremad Amager
IF Skjold Birkerød	1–3 (a.e.t.)	Hvidovre IF
Brande IF	0–2	Odense BK
Brøndby IF	2–0	Tårnby BK
Esbjerg fB	3–2	Haderslev FK
Helsingør IF	2–3 (a.e.t.)	Greve IF
Herning Fremad	3–0	Hobro IK
FIF Hillerød	2–1	Lyngby BK
Holstebro BK	2–2 (a.e.t.) (4–3 p)	Fredericia KFUM
Glostrup IF 32	4–1 (a.e.t.)	BK Avarta
Kastrup BK	3–1	Vordingborg IF
KB	1–2	Ølstykke FC
OKS	5–0	Egebjerg IF
Ringsted IF	2–1	Vanløse IF
Sønderborg BK	1–2	Bramming BK
Varde IF	1–1 (a.e.t.) (8–7 p)	Asaa BK
Viborg FF	3–2	Nørresundby BK
ØB	0–1	Roskilde BK
Aabyhøj IF	5–0	Aabenraa BK
Aalborg Chang	2–1	Nørre Aaby IK

== Third round ==
Team 1	Score	Team 2
AB	2–1	Bramming BK
B 1913	2–1 (a.e.t.)	Næstved IF
Ballerup IF	2–2 (a.e.t.) (2–3 p)	FIF Hillerød
Esbjerg fB	2–3	Brønshøj BK
Greve IF	0–2	Viborg FF
Herning Fremad	2–3	BK Frem
Holstebro BK	0–1	Hvidovre IF
Ikast FS	1–0	Silkeborg IF
Kastrup BK	2–0	Glostrup IF 32
Odense BK	5–2	Ringsted IF
OKS	1–3	Brøndby IF
Varde IF	0–2	AaB
Vejle BK	4–1	Roskilde BK
Ølstykke FC	2–1 (a.e.t.)	AGF
Aabyhøj IF	2–5 (a.e.t.)	Herfølge BK
Aalborg Chang	1–2	B 1903

== Fourth round ==
Team 1	Score	Team 2
AB	1–0	BK Frem
B 1903	0–1	Vejle BK
Brøndby IF	5–0	FIF Hillerød
Brønshøj BK	2–2 (a.e.t.) (1–4 p)	AaB
Herfølge BK	1–1 (a.e.t.) (6–5 p)	B 1913
Hvidovre IF	1–3	Ølstykke FC
Kastrup BK	1–2	Ikast FS
Odense BK	3–1	Viborg FF

== Quarter-finals ==
Team 1	Score	Team 2
AB	2–5	Odense BK
Brøndby IF	1–0	Vejle BK
Ølstykke FC	1–1 (a.e.t.) (3–2 p)	Ikast FS
AaB	5–1	Herfølge BK

== Semi-finals ==
Team 1	Agg.	Team 2	1st leg	2nd leg
Odense BK	8–0	Ølstykke FC	3–0	5–0
AaB	3–2	Brøndby IF	2–2	1–0

== Final ==
=== Regulation Game ===
9 May 1991

AaB	0–0 (a.e.t.)	Odense BK
	Report

Odense Stadion, Odense
Attendance: 13,212
Referee: Svend Erik Christensen

=== Replay ===
14 June 1991

AaB	0–0 (a.e.t.)	Odense BK
	Report
Penalties
Simonsen (penalty scored); H. Rasmussen (penalty scored); P. Rasmussen (penalty scored); Møller (penalty missed); Thorst (penalty missed)	3–4	(penalty missed) Bordinggaard; (penalty scored) Harder; (penalty scored) Jakobsen; (penalty scored) Donnerup; (penalty scored) Hansen

Odense Stadion, Odense
Attendance: 4,554
Referee: John P. Nielsen
