= List of Odense Boldklub records and statistics =

Odense Boldklub are a Danish professional association football club based in Odense, Denmark, who currently play in the Danish Superliga.

This list encompasses the major honours won by Odense, records set by the club, their managers and their players. The player records section includes details of the club's leading goalscorers and those who have made most appearances in first-team competitions. It also records notable achievements by Odense players on the international stage, and the highest transfer fees paid and received by the club. Attendance records at Odense Stadium are also included in the list.

The club have won 3 Danish championships.

All statistics are correct as of 20 August 2018

== Honours ==
Odense Boldklub honours
Honour	No.	Years
Danish Superliga	3	1977, 1982, 1989
Danish Cup	5	1982–83, 1990–91, 1992–93, 2001–02, 2006–07
UEFA Intertoto Cup	1	2006

== Player records ==
=== Most appearances ===
Competitive, professional matches only, appearances as substitute in brackets.

Players with most appearances for Odense Boldklub
No.	Name	Years	Total
1	Lars Høgh	1977–2000	817
2	Steen Nedergaard	1987–2000; 2003–2004	423
3	Michael Hemmingsen	1992–2005	410
4	Allan Hansen	1974–1977; 1980–1982; 1984–1988	355
5	Ulrik Moseby	1982–1993	339
6	Chris Sørensen	2004–2012	327
7	Poul Andersen	1974–1982	310
8	Frank Clausen	1982–1989	287
9	Johnny Hansen	1984–1991	284
10	Andrew Tembo	1997–2006	284

=== Top goalscorers ===
Competitive, professional matches only, appearances as substitute in brackets.

Top goalscorers for Odense Boldklub
No.	Name	Years	Total
1	Allan Hansen	1974–1977; 1980–1982; 1984–1988	130
2	Per Bartram		123
3	Mwape Miti	1997–2005	109
4	Vilhelm Munk Nielsen		102
5	Jørgen Leschly Sørensen	1982–1993	74
6	Peter Utaka	2008–2012	69
7	Svend Jørgen Hansen		64
8	Frode Nyegaard	1982–1989	63
9	Steffen Højer	2003–2005	54
10	Keld Bordinggaard	1981–1987; 1991	52

== Transfers ==
=== Record transfer fees received ===
Record transfer fees received by Odense Boldklub
	Player	To	Fee	Date
1	(Senegal) Baye Djiby Fall	(Russia) Lokomotiv Moscow	35 million DKK	12 March 2009
2	(Denmark) Jesper Christiansen	(Scotland) Rangers F.C.	22 million DKK	21 October 2000
3	(Denmark) Jonas Borring	(Denmark) FC Midtjylland	21 million DKK	23 June 2008
4	(Denmark) Ulrik Laursen	(Denmark) F.C. Copenhagen	17 million DKK	31 January 2008
5	(Mali) Kalilou Traoré	(France) Sochaux	15 million DKK	1 September 2012
