= 1982–83 Danish Cup =

Tournament details
- Country: Denmark

Final positions
- Champions: Odense BK
- Runners-up: B 1901

The 1982–83 Danish Cup was the 29th season of the Danish Cup, the highest football competition in Denmark. The final was played on 12 May 1983.

== First round ==
Team 1	Score	Team 2
IF AIA-Tranbjerg	3–1	Kerteminde BK
B 1908	3–2	Taastrup FC
B 1913	4–1	AaB
IF Skjold Birkerød	4–5 (a.e.t.)	Vordingborg IF
Bramming BK	4–1	Viby IF
Brønshøj BK	3–0	Frem Sakskøbing
Dragør BK	1–5	Glostrup IC
Frøbjerg GF	1–4	Kolding IF
Galten FS	1–2	Sankt Klemens Fangel IF
BK Hekla	0–8	Albertslund IF
Helsingør IF	1–3 (a.e.t.)	Gentofte-Vangede IF
Herning KFUM	3–1 (a.e.t.)	Nørresundby BK
Hjørring IF	2–1	Brande IF
Holstebro BK	5–2	Dronninglund IF
Lillerød IF	0–3	BK Fremad Valby
BK Marienlyst	0–1	Herning Fremad
Nakskov BK	0–3	Hellerup IK
B 1901	0–3	Holbæk B&I
OKS	2–1	Thisted FC
BK Pioneren	1–0	Stubbekøbing BK
Roskilde BK	1–6	BK Avarta
Roskilde KFUM	4–5 (a.e.t.)	Frederiksværk FK
Silkeborg IF	5–2 (a.e.t.)	IK Skovbakken
BK Sylvia	3–1	Nexø BK
Sønderborg BK	1–3	Kalundborg GB
Tved BK	2–3	Odense KFUM
BK Union	7–1	BK Posten København
Vejgaard BSK	0–4	Horsens fS

== Second round ==
Team 1	Score	Team 2
AB	3–2 (a.e.t.)	BK Frem
BK Avarta	3–1	Gentofte-Vangede IF
B 1903	2–1	Holbæk B&I
B 1908	0–3 (a.e.t.)	Brønshøj BK
B 1909	5–3	IF AIA-Tranbjerg
B 1913	2–0	Randers Freja
Bramming BK	1–3	Silkeborg IF
Brøndby IF	16–1	BK Pioneren
Frederikshavn fI	2–2 (a.e.t.) (3–4 p)	Kolding IF
Frederiksværk FK	3–3 (a.e.t.) (3–5 p)	Glostrup IC
BK Fremad Valby	1–0	Albertslund IF
Herfølge BK	1–0	Kolding IF
Herning Fremad	1–0	Hjørring IF
Herning KFUM	1–0	Horsens fS
Hellerup IK	2–0	Fremad Amager
Holstebro BK	2–2 (a.e.t.) (2–4 p)	Odense KFUM
Kastrup BK	5–1	Vordingborg IF
Sankt Klemens Fangel IF	1–3 (a.e.t.)	OKS
BK Sylvia	1–2	BK Union
Viborg FF	3–2 (a.e.t.)	Kalundborg GB

== Third round ==
Team 1	Score	Team 2
B 1901	2–0	OKS
Brøndby IF	2–0	BK Avarta
Brønshøj BK	2–0	AB
Glostrup IC	1–0 (a.e.t.)	B 1903
Herning Fremad	0–2	Herfølge BK
Herning KFUM	0–1 (a.e.t.)	B.93
Hvidovre IF	0–2	Lyngby BK
Ikast FS	2–0	Esbjerg fB
Kastrup BK	1–0	AGF
Køge BK	4–1 (a.e.t.)	Vejle BK
KB	2–1	B 1913
Odense BK	1–0 (a.e.t.)	B 1909
Odense KFUM	2–0	Hellerup IK
Silkeborg IF	0–2	Næstved IF
BK Union	0–5	Kolding IF
Viborg FF	5–1	BK Fremad Valby

== Fourth round ==
Team 1	Score	Team 2
B 1901	3–0	Brøndby IF
Ikast FS	1–0 (a.e.t.)	B.93
Kastrup BK	1–3 (a.e.t.)	Køge BK
Kolding IF	3–1	Brønshøj BK
Lyngby BK	2–1 (a.e.t.)	KB
Odense BK	3–1	Herfølge BK
Odense KFUM	0–5	Næstved IF
Viborg FF	0–0 (a.e.t.) (3–1 p)	Glostrup IC

== Quarter-finals ==
Team 1	Score	Team 2
B 1901	3–0	Næstved IF
Køge BK	0–2	Odense BK
Lyngby BK	2–0	Kolding IF
Viborg FF	2–1 (a.e.t.)	Ikast FS

== Semi-finals ==
Team 1	Agg.	Team 2	1st leg	2nd leg
B 1901	4–1	Viborg FF	4–0	0–1
Lyngby BK	2–3	Odense BK	1–0	1–3

== Final ==
12 May 1983

Odense BK	3–0	B 1901
Petersen 22'; Donnerup 69'; Bordinggaard 90'	Report

Københavns Idrætspark, Copenhagen
Attendance: 7,700
Referee: Erik Steen Jensen
