= 1964 Copenhagen Series =

Danish football league season

Københavnsserien
- Season: 1964
- Dates: 4 April – 31 October 1964 (group A); 4 April – 8 November 1964 (group B)
- Champions: BK Hero (2nd title) (group A); B.93 (II) (1st title) (group B)
- Promoted: BK Hero (group A)
- Relegated: Handelsstandens BK (group A); BK Frem (II) (group B); KFUM København (group B)
- Matches: 246
- Goals: 990 (4.02 per match)
- Biggest home win: BK Hero 6–0 Husum BK (16 August 1964)
- Biggest away win: Handelsstandens BK 0–8 BK Hero (22 August 1964)
- Highest scoring: BK Hero 8–4 Handelsstandens BK (10 May 1964)

The 1964 Copenhagen Series (Danish: Københavnsserien pulje A og B 1964; administratively known as the Senior Række KS 1 A and KS 1 B, 1964) was the 76th edition of the Copenhagen Football Championship since its establishment in 1889, the 62nd under the administration of Københavns Boldspil-Union (KBU) and the 6th season as one of the fifth tiers of the Danish football pyramid system. The season was launched on 4 April 1964 with five simultaneously played group A matches and five group B matches, interrupted by a two and a half month long summer break, and concluded with the last four group A league fixtures on 31 October and six group B fixtures on 8 November 1964. The season featured a Copenhagen football league structure consisting of two individual groups, with group A being composed solely of first senior men's teams, while group B was composed of reserve teams of higher ranking Copenhagen clubs. No reserve teams were eligible for promotion to the fourth tier. The clubs of the group A league entered the 1964–65 Danish Cup tournament in the second qualifying round for the Copenhagen FA's area.

BK Hero went through the season as undefeated, winning their second group A league title with an eight-point margin and more than twice as many goals scored compared to their closest league opponents, Kastrup BK, in second place, averaging four goals per game. The team had a run of nine wins and only made use of fourteen players throughout their winning season under coach Hans Hannibal. Handelsstandens BK finished at the bottom of the final league standings, for the second consecutive season, and was relegated to the 1965 KBUs Mellemrække. B.93's reserve team won their first group B league title with the reserve team of Brønshøj BK in second place.

== Summary ==
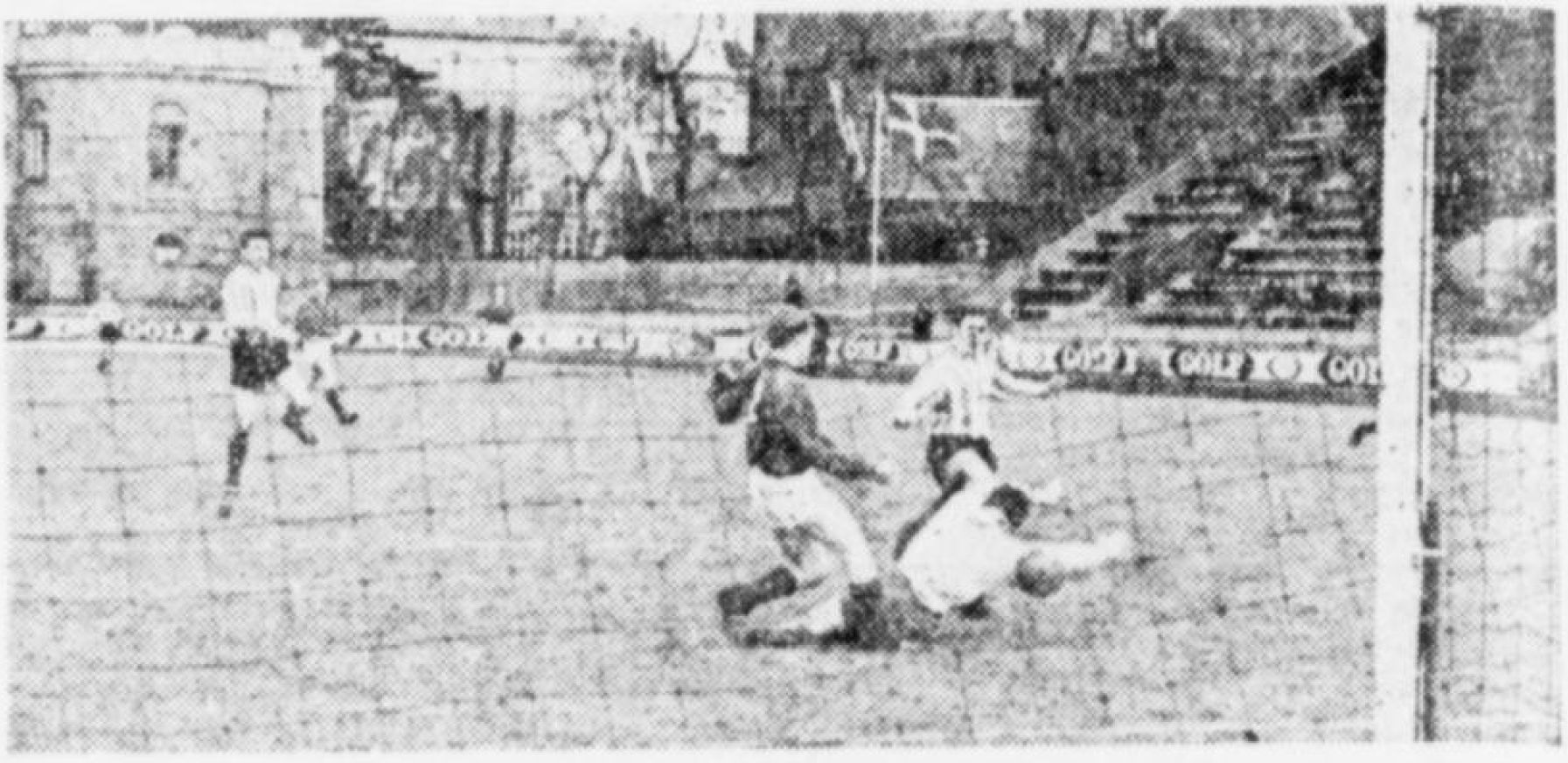
First match day action on 4 April at Østerbro Stadium between Østerbros BK vs BK Stefan.

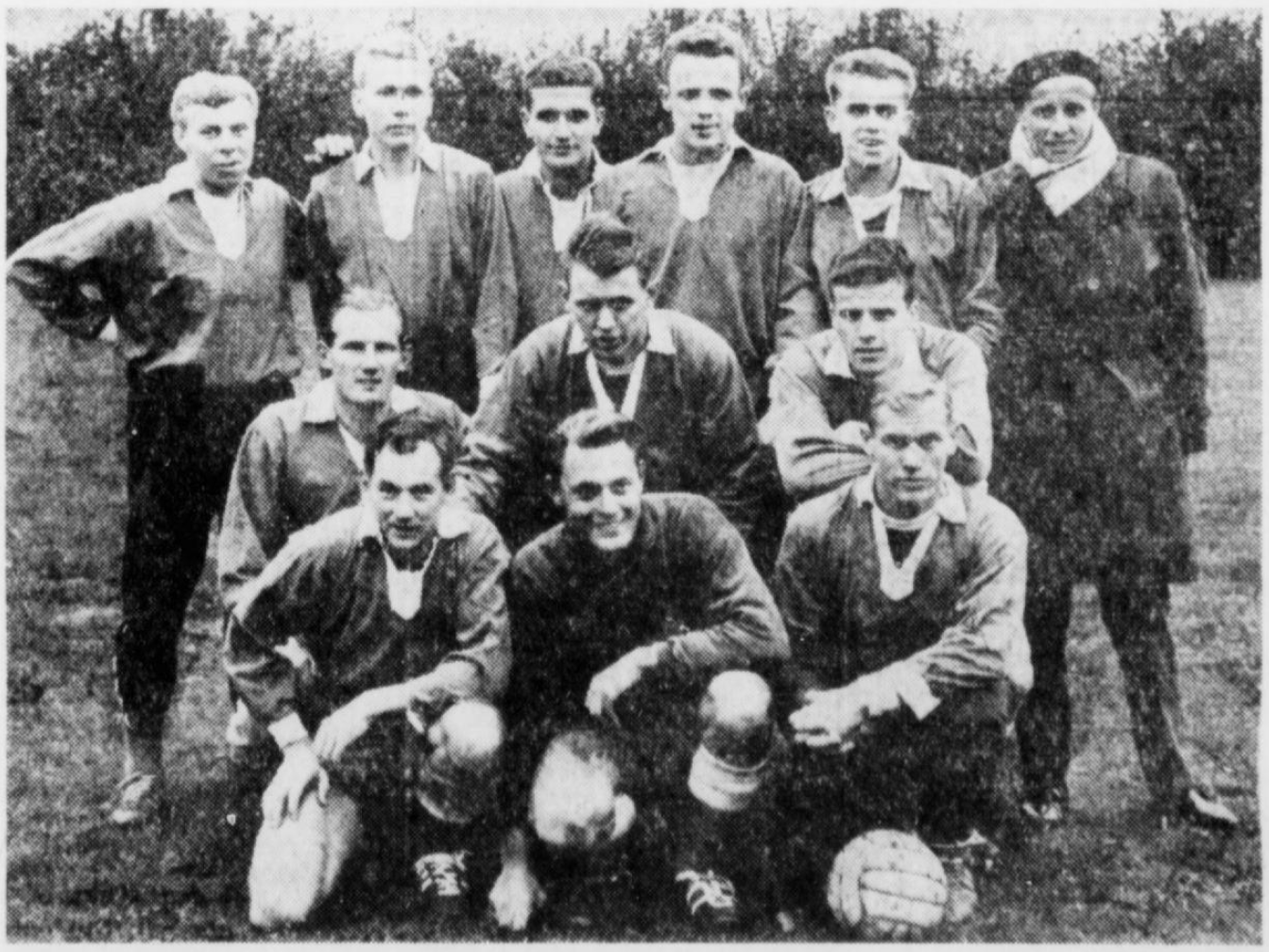
The line-up of BK Hero after their last match against BK Frederiksholm on 31 October, featuring (L-R) front: Poul Larsen, Eigil Larsen (goalkeeper) and John Petersen; center: Knud Jørgensen, Preben Møller and Kjeld Petersen; back: Bent Knudsen, Torben Michaelsen, Mogens Langkilde, Tonny Poppe, Kaj Christensen and coach Hans Hannibal.

With no KBU-members having been demoted from the 1963 Kvalifikationsturneringen to the regional top-flight league, the Copenhagen FA hence did not relegate Handelsstandens BK to the regional second-tier league, 1964 KBUs Mellemrække. Handelsstandens BK had finished the last season in the last spot in the final league standings. The match schedule for the group A league's spring season was published on 10 January 1964 by the Copenhagen FA, while the fall season's match schedule was published during the summer break.

The season was officially launched on 4 April 1926 with five league matches in group A featuring BK Frederiksholm versus Kastrup BK, BK Hellas versus BK Hero, Husum BK versus Handelsstandens BK, Østerbros BK versus BK Stefan and B 1908 versus BK Fremad Valby. The first match day included a replay of a fixture from the last round of the previous season in which last season's eighth placed team BK Fremad Valby had defeated last season's runners-up B 1908, preventing the Amager-based club from earning a promotion to the fourth tier – this first round fixture at Sundby Idrætspark between the two clubs ended in a tie. Newly promoted Østerbros BK won their first round match against Husum BK with the only goal of the match scored by Østerbros BK's Heinz Sørensen in the 48th minute in front of 500 spectators. The first goal of the season was netted by Bjarne Hansen from Handelsstandens BK in the 5th minute in the club's away game against Husum BK at Husum Idrætspark.

Kastrup BK, trained by coach Tonny Andersen since 1963, went victoriously through the first six match days, placing themselves at the top of the league standings with maximum points, having scored 16 goals with 2 goals scored against them – a great contrast compared to last season, where the club lost their first four matches and only managed to score one goal. On 3 May, Handelsstandens BK managed to tie the home clash against BK Stefan their at Østerbro Stadium, earning their first point in their fifth league match of the season. Kastrup BK lost their first match of the season against BK Hero on 21 May in front of an attendance of 900 people at Tårnby Stadium, with BK Hero's Preben Bendtner scoring the game's only goal in the 65th minute. Kastrup BK's line-up included two reserve forwards and left the field without scoring and obtaining any points for the first time in the season. BK Hero was on top of the league standings for two match days until Kastrup BK reclaimed the top spot in the 7th round and 8th round due to a better goal average. Halfway through the season, Kastrup BK were leading the KBU league with 14 points, the same number of points as BK Hero, while B 1908 was in third place with 12 points. Handelsstandens BK was in the last spot of the league standings with only one point, obtained at their tied match against BK Stefan.

Following a ten week long summer break, the fall season was inaugurated on 15 August 1964 with three league matches. On 5 September, the two closest title contenders, BK Hero and Kastrup BK, clashed again at Gladsaxe Idrætspark in front of approx. 900 spectators. BK Hero's newly arrived footballer Torben Michaelsen – a former Kastrup BK player – scored the first goal after 22 minutes of play in a match that saw BK Hero win 5–1 and make the final break-away from their closest league title contenders. BK Hero had a run of nine wins, winning all their matches in the fall season, while Kastrup BK and B 1908 trailed behind with several losses along the way. Early in the season, B 1908, under the guidance of coach Jørgen Vendelbo, frequently trailed behind the two title contenders, but in the fall season they had several encounters with the second place that was due to a streak of four winning matches, where they scored at least five goals against their opponents.

The league title was claimed by BK Hero with two rounds remaining by winning their away game 9–2 against Østerbros BK on 11 November at Østerbro Stadium, with Torben Michaelsen and Tonny Poppe scoring both scoring hat-tricks in the process. The then mayor of Gladsaxe Municipality, Erhard Jakobsen, congratulated the players at the following match against B 1908 on 24 October, where they were also presented with the league trophy at a reception. The Søborg-based club only made use of 14 players overall, while B 1908 in contrast had 6 new players in their 11 November home clash against BK Stefan and x reserve players at ... The squad of BK Hero was composed of goalkeeper Eigil Larsen, defenders Poul Larsen and John Petersen, midfielders Knud Jørgensen, Preben Møller, Kjeld Petersen and Søren Bjerring, forwards Bent Knudsen, Torben Michaelsen, Mogens Langkilde, Tonny Poppe, Kaj Christensen, Erik Poppe and Preben Bendtner, and was coached by Hans Hannibal. They were part of the five most goal-oriented matches. The league's clubs entered the 1964–65 Danish Cup in the second qualifying round for members of the Copenhagen FA. BK Hero, Kastrup BK and BK Fremad Valby reached the second round proper of the main cup tournament. Three KBU-members were relegated from the fourth tier, leaving one relegation spot to the worst placed team in the Copenhagen Series. Handelsstandens BK sealed their relegation to the sixth tier after having lost their away match against Kastrup BK on 24 November, a fixture that was part of the match day 17.

== Teams ==
Ten teams competed in the league's group A – nine teams from the previous season and one team promoted from the regional second tier. The promoted team was Østerbros BK, who returned after a two-year absence, replacing BK Dalgas, who had won promotion to the 1964 Kvalifikationsturneringen. Handelsstandens BK finished the previous season in the last spot, but was not relegated due to no Copenhagen-based teams being relegated from the fourth tier. The league had three Valby-based teams of which two of them played their matches at Valby Idrætspark, while the third team played their matches at Frederiksberg Idrætspark in Frederiksberg.

=== Stadiums and locations ===
Locations of the 1964 Copenhagen Series teams (club houses) in Group A.

Club	Location	Stadium	Capacity	Ref
B 1908	Sundbyvester, Copenhagen	Sundby Idrætspark		
BK Frederiksholm	Valby, Copenhagen	Valby Idrætspark	6,000	
BK Fremad Valby	Valby, Copenhagen	Valby Idrætspark	6,000	
Handelsstandens BK	Østerbro, Copenhagen	Østerbro Stadium		
BK Hellas	Valby, Copenhagen	Frederiksberg Idrætspark		
BK Hero	Søborg	Gladsaxe Idrætspark		
Husum BK	Husum, Copenhagen	Husum Idrætspark		
Kastrup BK	Kastrup	Tårnby Stadium		
BK Stefan	Bispebjerg, Copenhagen	Genforeningspladsen		
Østerbros BK	Østerbro, Copenhagen	Østerbro Stadium		

Club	Location	Stadium	Capacity	Ref
B.93 (II)	Østerbro, Copenhagen	B.93's Bane		
Brønshøj BK (II)	Brønshøj-Husum, Copenhagen	Rådvadsvej		
Kjøbenhavns BK (II)	Frederiksberg	KB's Bane, Peter Bangs Vej		
Hvidovre IF (II)	Hvidovre	Hvidovre IF's Bane		
B 1903 (II)				
Vanløse IF (II)	Vanløse, Copenhagen	Vanløse Idrætspark		
BK Frem (III)	Valby, Copenhagen	BK Frem's Bane		
Kjøbenhavns BK (III)	Frederiksberg	KB's Bane, Peter Bangs Vej		
Brønshøj BK (III)				
BK Frem (II)	Valby, Copenhagen	BK Frem's Bane		
Skovshoved IF (II)	Klampenborg, Gentofte	Skovshoved Idrætspark		
Hellerup IK (II)	Hellerup	Hellerup IK's Bane		
KFUM København (II)		Emdrupparken		

=== Personnel ===
Team	Head coach	Captain	Ref
B 1908	(Denmark) Jørgen Wendelboe	(Denmark) John Andersson	
BK Frederiksholm		(Denmark) Bjarne Jensen	
BK Fremad Valby			
Handelsstandens BK			
BK Hellas			
BK Hero	(Denmark) Hans Hannibal		
Husum BK			
Kastrup BK	(Denmark) Tonny Andersen		
BK Stefan		(Denmark) Per Frederiksen	
Østerbros BK			

=== Coaching changes ===
Jørgen Vendelbo switched to Hørsholm-Usserød IK at some point during the season.

== League table ==
In group A, every team played two games against the other teams, at home and away, totaling 18 games each, while each team in group B played two games against the other teams for a total of 24 games. Teams received two points for a win and one point for a draw. If two or more teams were tied on points, places were determined by goal average. The team with the most points were crowned winners of the group and joint winners of the league. The winners of group A were promoted to the 1965 Kvalifikationsturneringen. The team with the fewest points in both group B would be relegated to the 1965 KBUs Mellemrække. The number of relegations in group A was dependent on how many of the five KBU members, participating in the 1964 Kvalifikationsturneringen, that would be relegated from the fourth tier. Due to the Copenhagen FA's pre-season decision to expand the league to include twelve teams, somewhere between zero and three teams could be relegated.

=== Københavnsserien, group A ===
Pos	Team	Pld	W	D	L	GF	GA	GR	Pts	Promotion, qualification or relegation
1	BK Hero (C, P)	18	15	3	0	77	24	3.208	33	Promotion to the 1965 Kvalifikationsturneringen
2	Kastrup BK	18	11	3	4	38	24	1.583	25	
3	B 1908	18	8	7	3	43	25	1.720	23	
4	BK Stefan	18	8	4	6	34	29	1.172	20	
5	BK Fremad Valby	18	8	3	7	32	30	1.067	19	
6	Østerbros BK	18	5	6	7	28	41	0.683	16	
7	BK Hellas	18	6	1	11	31	38	0.816	13	
8	BK Frederiksholm	18	5	2	11	28	47	0.596	12	
9	Husum BK	18	5	2	11	25	44	0.568	12	
10	Handelsstandens BK (R)	18	2	3	13	20	54	0.370	7	Relegation to the 1965 KBUs Mellemrække

Rules for classification: 1) Points 2) Goal average
(C) Champions; (P) Promoted; (R) Relegated

=== Københavnsserien, group B ===
Pos	Team	Pld	W	D	L	GF	GA	GR	Pts	Promotion, qualification or relegation
1	B.93 (II) (C)	24	16	3	5	68	29	2.345	35	
2	Brønshøj BK (II)	24	14	6	4	65	31	2.097	34	
3	Kjøbenhavns BK (II)	24	14	5	5	58	32	1.813	33	
4	Hvidovre IF (II)	24	12	8	4	45	23	1.957	32	
5	B 1903 (II)	24	14	3	7	68	34	2.000	31	
6	Vanløse IF (II)	24	12	5	7	55	43	1.279	29	
7	BK Frem (III)	24	10	6	8	67	51	1.314	26	
8	Kjøbenhavns BK (III)	24	9	3	12	41	49	0.837	21	
9	Brønshøj BK (III)	24	7	3	14	44	65	0.677	17	
10	BK Frem (II) (R)	24	7	1	16	36	75	0.480	15	Relegation to the 1965 KBUs Mellemrække
11	Skovshoved IF (II)	24	6	3	15	32	69	0.464	15	
12	Hellerup IK (II)	24	4	5	15	26	68	0.382	13	
13	KFUM København (II) (R)	24	5	1	18	29	65	0.446	11	Relegation to the 1965 KBUs Mellemrække

Rules for classification: 1) Points 2) Goal average
(C) Champions; (R) Relegated

== Results ==
=== Københavnsserien, group A ===
Home \ Away	BKH	KBK	B08	BKS	BFV	OEB	HEL	BKF	HBK	HAN
BK Hero	—	5–1	5–1	6–3	2–2	4–1	3–1	6–2	6–0	8–4
Kastrup BK	0–1	—	1–1	2–1	4–0	1–1	3–0	5–3	2–0	4–1
B 1908	1–1	1–1	—	1–4	0–0	2–2	5–1	2–1	5–0	3–1
BK Stefan	2–2	1–2	1–3	—	5–2	2–1	2–2	2–1	2–1	1–1
BK Fremad Valby	2–3	0–2	2–1	1–0	—	5–2	0–1	0–1	5–2	1–0
Østerbros BK	2–9	1–2	1–1	1–0	1–1	—	1–4	3–2	2–0	1–4
BK Hellas	0–1	3–2	2–4	0–3	2–4	1–2	—	3–1	0–1	0–1
BK Frederiksholm	0–4	1–3	0–5	1–2	3–1	2–2	3–2	—	2–1	0–0
Husum BK	2–3	4–1	1–1	1–2	0–3	1–1	1–6	4–1	—	3–1
Handelsstandens BK	0–8	0–2	1–6	1–1	1–3	0–3	1–3	2–4	1–3	—

Legend: Blue = home team win; Yellow = draw; Red = away team win.

=== Københavnsserien, group B ===
Home \ Away	B93	BB2	KB2	HIF	B03	VIF	BF3	KB3	BB3	BF2	SIF	HIK	KFU
B.93 (II)	—	–		–	3–2	0–1	–			0–2		3–1	
Brønshøj BK (II)		—	–	1–1	6–3		0–0	4–1		5–1			
Kjøbenhavns BK (II)	1–4		—		1–1		0–1	2–0	6–2	2–1		4–0	5–1
Hvidovre (II)	1–1			—		–	2–1		5–1		5–0	1–1	3–1
B 1903 (II)		0–3	3–3		—		5–1	7–1	3–1		3–3		6–0
Vanløse IF (II)	2–3					—		2–4	2–1		4–1		–
BK Frem (III)			2–2	0–0	2–3	3–3	—	3–2		4–2			
Kjøbenhavns BK (III)		1–1	1–3	2–3		1–2	3–1	—	–				2–1
Brønshøj BK (III)		1–1		0–2	0–2	5–3			—			2–3	
BK Frem (II)	0–6	1–7	1–3	1–5	–	–	4–2	3–0	0–3	—			
Skovshoved IF (II)		1–1	0–5	0–4		3–2	1–1		–		—		–
Hellerup IK (II)	1–4	2–2	0–3	0–4	–	1–2		–			0–0	—	0–0
KFUM København (II)	0–1	4–1	–	1–2	0–2	2–5	–	2–1				1–2	—

Legend: Blue = home team win; Yellow = draw; Red = away team win.

== Group A statistics ==
=== Scoring ===
==== Top scorers ====
There were 356 goals scored in 90 matches, for an average of 3.96 goals per match. Three own goals were scored during the tournament.

Rank	Player	Club	Goals
...	(Denmark) Mogens Langkilde	BK Hero	14
...	(Denmark) Preben Bendtner	BK Hero	14
...	(Denmark) Tonny Poppe	BK Hero	12
...	(Denmark) Torben Michaelsen	BK Hero	11
...	(Denmark) Kaj Christensen	BK Hero	10
...	(Denmark) Bent Knudsen	BK Hero	7
...	(Denmark) Erik Poppe	BK Hero	4
...	(Denmark) Søren Bjerring	BK Hero	3

==== Hat-tricks ====
Player	For	Against	Result	Date	Ref
(Denmark) Eddie Nielsen	Kastrup BK	BK Fremad Valby	4–0 (H)	2 May 1964	
(Denmark) Mogens Langkilde^{4}	BK Hero	Handelsstandens BK	8–4 (H)	10 May 1964	
(Denmark) Preben Bendtner	BK Hero	Handelsstandens BK	8–4 (H)	10 May 1964	
(Denmark) John Elsbøll	BK Fremad Valby	Østerbros BK	5–2 (H)	6 June 1964	
(Denmark) Preben Bendtner	BK Hero	Handelsstandens BK	8–0 (A)	22 August 1964	
(Denmark) Claus Ahrensberg	B 1908	Husum BK	5–0 (H)	6 September 1964	
(Denmark) Claus Ahrensberg	B 1908	Handelsstandens BK	6–1 (A)	12 September 1964	
(Denmark) John Elsbøl	BK Fremad Valby	BK Hellas	4–2 (A)	27 September 1964	
(Denmark) Torben Michaelsen^{4}	BK Hero	Østerbros BK	9–2 (A)	11 October 1964	
(Denmark) Tonny Poppe	BK Hero	Østerbros BK	9–2 (A)	11 October 1964	

- ^{4} Player scored 4 goals

=== Clean sheets ===
Rank	Player	Club	Matches	Clean sheets	Ref
—	(Denmark) Eigil Larsen	BK Hero	18	5	
—	(Denmark) Egon Petersen	BK Fremad Valby	—	4	
—	n/a	Østerbros BK		3	
—	(Denmark) Søren Greve	BK Stefan	—	2	
—	n/a	B 1908		3	
—	n/a	Kastrup BK		5	
—	n/a	BK Hellas		4	
—	n/a	Handelsstandens BK		2	
—	n/a	BK Frederiksholm		1	
—	n/a	Husum BK		1	

=== Discipline ===
==== Player ====
- Most evictions: 1
  - (Denmark) Bjørn Basbøll (BK Frederiksholm) on 24 November 1964 against BK Stefan

==== Club ====
- Most evictions: 1
  - BK Frederiksholm
