= 1927–28 KBUs A-række =

KBUs A-række
- Season: 1927–28
- Dates: 28 August 1927 – 21 June 1928 (regular season); 4 July 1928 (play-offs)
- Champions: Hellerup IK (2nd title)
- Promoted: none
- Relegated: none
- Matches: 55
- Goals: 291 (5.29 per match)
- Top goalscorer: Hemming Nielsen (16 goals)
- Biggest home win: BK Borup 8–0 Frederiksberg BK (25 March 1928)
- Biggest away win: Frederiksberg BK 0–6 KFUMs BK (16 October 1927)
- Highest scoring: Frederiksberg BK 3–8 Østerbros BK (18 September 1927)
- Total number of matches and goals played does not include the promotion play-off match.

The 1927–28 KBUs A-række (administratively known as Senior Række A 1, 1927/28) was the 22nd season of the KBUs A-række – the second tier of the Copenhagen football league structure organised by Kjøbenhavns Boldspil-Union (KBU). The season was launched in on 28 August 1927 and the final rounds of regular league fixtures were held on 21 June 1928 with the play-off promotion match being held on 4 July 1928. Handelsstandens BK were the defending league winners from the 1926–27 KBU season, but did not manage to earn promotion to the 1927–28 KBUs Mesterskabsrække in last season's promotion play-off matches and hence remained in the league. The winner of the league qualified for promotion/relegation play-off matches against the lowest placed team of the 1927–28 KBUs Mesterskabsrække for a spot in the 1928–29 KBUs Mesterskabsrække. The winners and the runners-up would also qualify for the 1928 KBUs Pokalturnering at the end of the season, while the winners, the runners-up and the third placed team qualified for participation in the 1928–29 Danmarksmesterskabsturneringen i Fodbold.

The winners of the league were Hellerup IK (HIK), who secured the overall league victory on 3 June 1928 against Østerbros BK at their home ground, and hence qualified for the promotion play-off matches against the lowest placed team in the 1927–28 KBUs Mesterskabsrække, BK Fremad Amager. This was the club's second overall tier 2 Copenhagen league championship, having won the league six years earlier. For the third consecutive season, Østerbros BK finished as the runners-up in the league. In 1928, the profits from the organisation of the matches involving the Denmark national football team were redistributed to the highest ranking clubs under the Copenhagen FA – primarily to the largest clubs in the KBUs Mesterskabsrække and secondarily to the clubs located in the KBUs A-række. Hemming Nielsen, who during the season played for B 1908, became the top goalscorer with 16 goals, scoring more than half of the goals for his club.

== Season summary ==
The season was started on 28 August 1927 with two league match fixtures; BK Borup against BK Viktoria and Hellerup IK against BK Union, while a third match between Frederiksberg BK and KFUMs BK had to be cancelled due to the condition on the football field. Three days prior to the season's start, on 26 August, B 1908 won the final match in the 1927 edition of the Fælledklubbernes Pokalturnering against the league rivals Handelstandens BK.

Halfway through the season, Østerbros BK were leading the KBU league with 10 points, while the club in the competition located farthest to the north, Hellerup IK, was in second place with 9 points for 5 matches after 4 wins and 1 draw, and with 20 goals scored and 6 against them. Prior to one of the season's last league matches on 3 June 1928 11:00 CEST at Hellerup Sportspark (also referred to as "Banen ved Phistersvej" or simply "H.I.K.'s Bane"), both competitors for the league championship this season, Hellerup IK and Østerbros BK, were undefeated in the league. Throughout the season, the two clubs had followed each other; Hellerup IK had 15 points for 8 matches (one draw against KFUMs BK in the fall of 1927), while Østerbros BK had 16 points for 9 matches due to two draws (1–1 against BK Viktoria and 2–2 against B 1908). Hence, Hellerup IK could settle with a tie in the forthcoming match as the team (playing in a kit featuring white shirts and blue shorts) were expecting to win their last match in the season against Valby BK, who had lost a significant number of matches. The season's top league match, which was attended by 4-500 spectators and refereed by Lauritz Andersen (affiliated with BK Velo), would secure either club the overall league title of the season.

In the first half of the game, the away team, Østerbros BK, had the upper hand, but the Ø.B. players were not able to take advantage of their chances and score against the home team. Instead the H.I.K. centerforward, Reinholdt Sylvander (still with injuries from a game against B 1908), used a momentum during the first half to dribble through the opponent's defence, but as he was about make a shot inside the penalty area, he was turned upside down by defender Aage Andersen — an offence the referee deemed illegal and the Hellerup team was awarded a penalty kick. The penalty kick was quickly executed by Ejvind Andersen and this goal ended up being the only one during the entire match. During the second half, the teams were more even, and both the Hellerup IK and Østerbros BK forwards had several close attempts. Hence Hellerup IK secured the club's second KBUs A-række league championship, for the first time in six years, while Østerbros BK for the second consecutive season finished in second place. The regular players featured in the Hellerup-team's line-ups during the season included the following the goalkeeper Henry Schnabelrauch (attached to BK Fremad Amager the previous season, making him debut on 28 August 1927); the defenders Poul Petersen, P. Kjærgaard and Alf Nilsson; the midfielders William Kirkland, Knud Sørensen, Louis Olsen and Arnold Jensen; the forwards Ejvind "Møllen" Andersen, Mogens Larsen, Reinholdt Sylvander, Oscar Olsen, Ejnar Nilsson, Claude Vincent and Ejnar Rørby.

The league match between BK Standard and Valby BK played on 23 October 1927, 12:00 at Sundby Idrætspark ended with a 2–0 victory to BK Standard. The second half of the match was not played, because it was abandoned by the Valby BK players due to the severe weather conditions (rain and storm) and the effect on the football field, that had been ongoing since 7 o'clock in the morning. In the week up to the match, several of the Valby BK players had been sick in bed, and therefore found it reasonable to abandon the remaining part of the match. Kjøbenhavns Boldspil-Union (KBU) later changed the score to 0–0! and awarded BK Standard the game as a 2 points victory. Several other matches in the lower levels across the Copenhagen area, that took place on the same day, were also either cancelled or abandoned for the same reasons.

Unlike the 1927–28 KBUs Mesterskabsrække, the majority of the league matches of the KBUs A-række took place at the club's home/away fields or at a neutral ground located in Copenhagen. Five league matches of importance at the very end of the season were scheduled to be played at Københavns Idrætspark with the purpose of promoting the second tier league championship and at a lower entrance fee at the gates – the matches were played on 10 May (BK Viktoria vs. Østerbros BK), 24 May (BK Union vs. Østerbros BK), 6 June (BK Viktoria vs. B 1908), 7 June (Handelsstandens BK vs. BK Standard) and 17 June 1928 (Valby BK vs. Hellerup IK). The promotion/relegation play-off matches for the team with the fewest points in the league were cancelled this season. Instead, the winners of the 1927–28 KBUs B-række, Boldklubben Ydun (of Frederiksberg), were automatically promoted to the 1928–29 season of the KBUs A-Række. After BK Velo pulled their senior men's team from the league following the completion of the fall season of 1926–27 season, the second-tier KBU league was left with only 11 teams, which would be expanded to 12 teams beginning with the 1928–29 season.

== Teams ==
=== Stadia and locations ===
Five league matches involving BK Viktoria, Østerbros BK, BK Union, B 1908, Handelsstandens BK and BK Standard were played at Københavns Idrætspark.

| Club | Location | Stadium |
|---|---|---|
| Hellerup IK | Hellerup | Hellerup Sportspark |
| Østerbros BK | Østerbro | Fælledparken |
| BK Viktoria | Østerbro | Fælledparken |
| B 1908 | Sundbyvester | Sundby Idrætspark |
| BK Standard | Sundbyøster | Sundby Idrætspark |
| Handelsstandens BK | Østerbro | Fælledparken |
| KFUMs BK | Emdrup | Emdrup Idrætspark |
| BK Borup | Østerbro | Fælledparken |
| BK Union | Østerbro | Fælledparken |
| Valby BK | Valby | Fælledparken |
| Frederiksberg BK | Frederiksberg | Frederiksberg Idrætspark |

== League table ==
A total of 11 teams were contesting the league, all 11 sides from the 1926–27 season. No team was promoted from the 1926–27 KBUs B-række or relegated from the 1926–27 KBUs Mesterskabsrække. Every team played one game against each other team, either one at home, away or on a neutral field. Teams received two points for a win and one point for a draw. If two or more teams were tied on points, places were determined by head-to-head points and goal ratio. The team with the most points were crowned winners of the league and entered a promotion play-off.

| Pos | Team | Pld | W | D | L | GF | GA | GR | Pts | Promotion, qualification or relegation |
|---|---|---|---|---|---|---|---|---|---|---|
| 1 | Hellerup IK (C) | 10 | 9 | 1 | 0 | 36 | 12 | 3.000 | 19 | Qualification for the Promotion play-offs, 1928 KBUs Pokalturnering & 1928–29 Danmarksmesterskabsturneringen |
| 2 | Østerbros BK | 10 | 7 | 2 | 1 | 33 | 13 | 2.538 | 16 | Qualification for the 1928 KBUs Pokalturnering & 1928–29 Danmarksmesterskabsturneringen |
| 3 | BK Viktoria | 10 | 5 | 3 | 2 | 21 | 18 | 1.167 | 13 | Qualification for the 1928–29 Danmarksmesterskabsturneringen |
| 4 | B 1908 | 10 | 4 | 3 | 3 | 29 | 27 | 1.074 | 11 (Note: B1908 are ahead of BK Standard on head-to-head points: BK Standard 2–3 B1908) | |
| 5 | BK Standard | 10 | 5 | 1 | 4 | 28 | 21 | 1.333 | 11 | |
| 6 | Handelsstandens BK | 10 | 5 | 0 | 5 | 29 | 20 | 1.450 | 10 | |
| 7 | KFUMs BK | 10 | 4 | 1 | 5 | 39 | 29 | 1.345 | 9 | |
| 8 | BK Borup | 10 | 3 | 1 | 6 | 22 | 28 | 0.786 | 7 (Note: BK Borup are ahead of BK Union on head-to-head points: BK Union 1–2 BK Borup) | |
| 9 | BK Union | 10 | 3 | 1 | 6 | 22 | 31 | 0.710 | 7 | |
| 10 | Valby BK | 10 | 2 | 1 | 7 | 18 | 44 | 0.409 | 5 | |
| 11 | Frederiksberg BK | 10 | 1 | 0 | 9 | 14 | 48 | 0.292 | 2 | |

Rules for classification: 1) Points; 2) Head-to-head points; 3) Goal ratio
(C) Champions

== Results ==
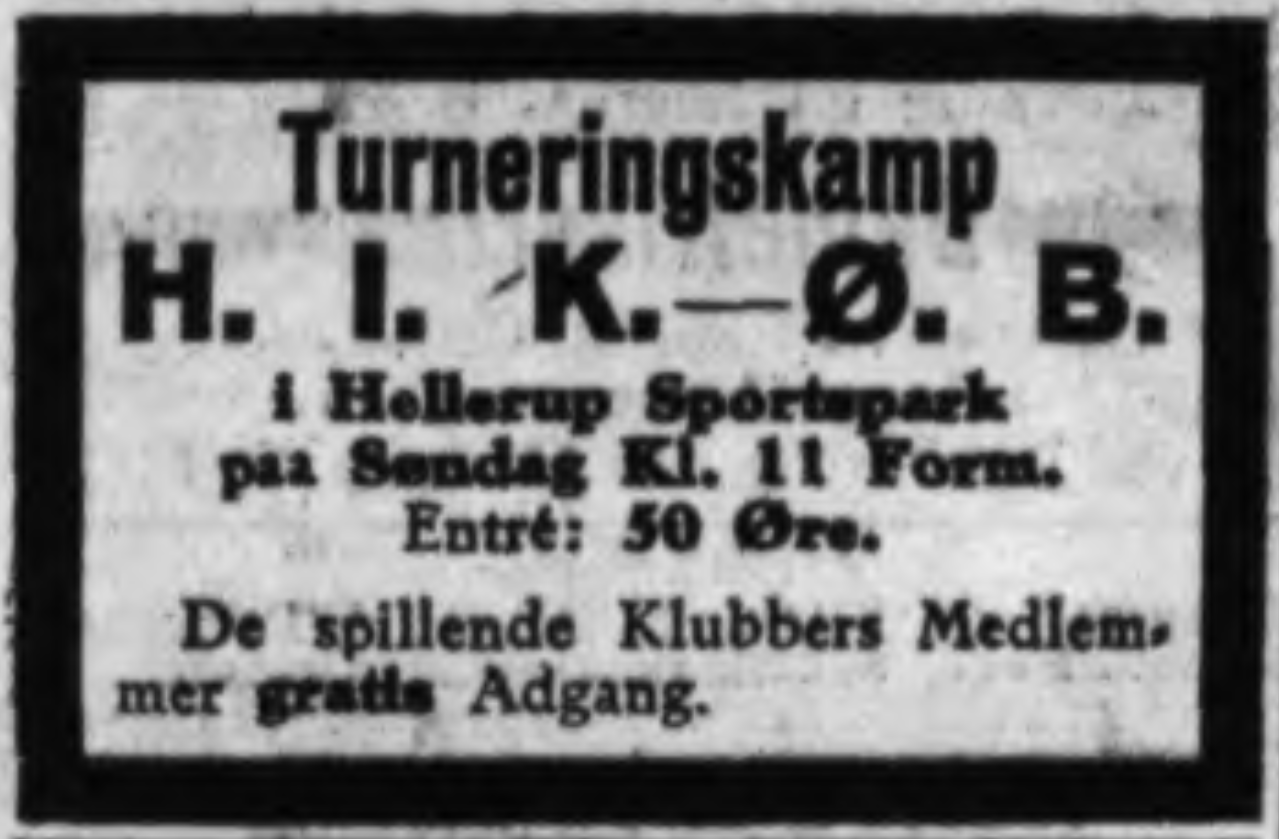
Newspaper advertisement for the league match on 3 June 1928 between Hellerup IK and Østerbros BK, that secured the league championship for the Hellerup-based club.

| Home \ Away | HIK | OEB | BKV | B08 | BKS | HBK | KFU | BKB | BKU | VBK | FBK |
|---|---|---|---|---|---|---|---|---|---|---|---|
| Hellerup IK | — | 1–0 | — | 2–1 | 4–2 | 5–1 | — | 5–1 | 3–1 | — | 5–1 |
| Østerbros BK | — | — | — | — | 3–1 | 2–0 | — | 2–0 | — | 7–1 | — |
| BK Viktoria | 1–3 | 1–1 | — | 2–2 | 2–2 | — | — | — | 2–1 | 3–2 | — |
| B 1908 | — | 2–2 | — | — | — | 1–4 | — | 4–4 | — | 6–1 | — |
| BK Standard | — | — | — | 2–3 | — | — | — | — | 5–1 | 0–0^{‡} | — |
| Handelsstandens BK | — | — | 1–2 | — | 2–4 | — | 2–3 | 1–0^{†} | 5–1 | 8–1 | 5–1 |
| KFUMs BK | 3–3 | 3–5 | 5–2 | 2–3 | 3–5 | — | — | — | 2–3 | 8–1 | — |
| BK Borup | — | — | 1–4 | — | 0–5 | — | 5–4 | — | — | — | 8–0 |
| BK Union | — | 1–3 | — | 5–2 | — | — | — | 1–2 | — | 5–5 | — |
| Valby BK | 1–5 | — | — | — | — | — | — | 2–1 | — | — | — |
| Frederiksberg BK | — | 3–8 | 0–2 | 3–5 | 3–2 | — | 0–6 | — | 2–3 | 1–4 | — |

Legend: Blue = home team win; Yellow = draw; Red = away team win.
For upcoming matches, an "a" indicates there is an article about the rivalry between the two participants.

^{†}: The match between Handelsstandens BK and BK Borup played on 15 March 1928, 13:00 at Fælledparken originally ended in a tie (1–1), but Handelsstandens BK appealed the first goal in match by BK Borup, and won the appeal, resulting in winning the match 1–0.
^{‡}: The second half of the match between BK Standard and Valby BK played on 23 October 1927, 12:00 at Sundby Idrætspark was not played. The match was abandoned at the score of 2–0 by the Valby BK players due to the severe weather conditions. Kjøbenhavns Boldspil-Union (KBU) later changed the score to 0–0! and awarded BK Standard the game as a 2 points victory.

== Season statistics ==
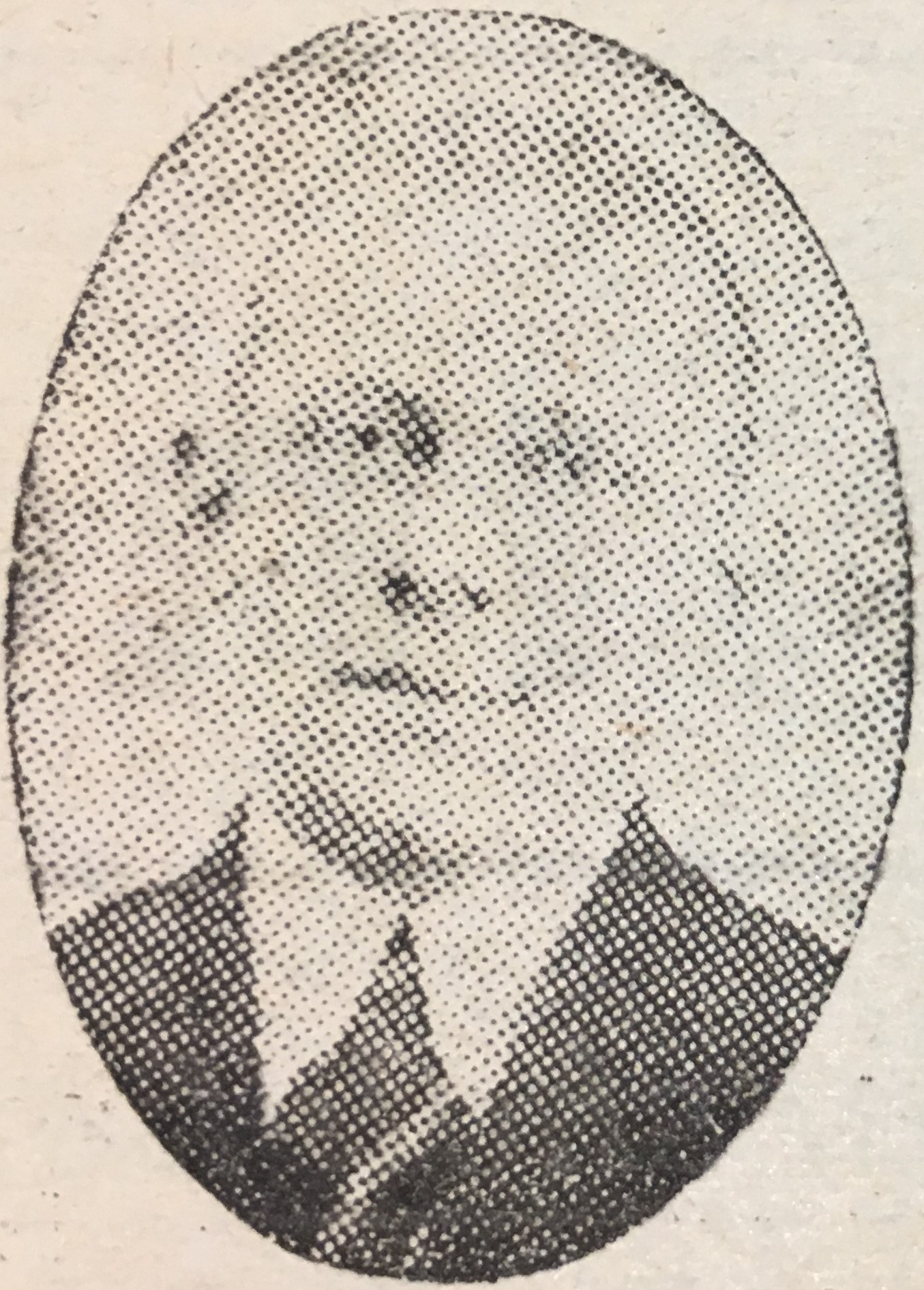
The league's top goalscorer in the 1927/28 season with 16 goals, Hemming Nielsen, of B 1908.

=== Top scorers ===
| Rank | Player | Club | Goals |
|---|---|---|---|
| 1 | (Denmark) Hemming Nielsen | B 1908 | 16 |
| 2 | (Denmark) Reinholdt Sylvander | Hellerup IK | 14 |
| 3 | (Denmark) Børge Walsøe | KFUMs BK | 13 |
| 3 | (Denmark) Erwin Jensen | BK Borup | 13 |
| 5 | (Denmark) Ejnard Larsen | KFUMs BK | 12 |
| 5 | (Denmark) Lund Henriksen | BK Standard | 12 |
| 7 | (Denmark) Alex Baunhøj | Østerbros BK | 11 |
| 8 | (Denmark) Axel Jønsson | BK Viktoria | 10 |
| 9 | (Denmark) Ole Olsen | Handelsstandens BK | 9 |
| 10 | (Denmark) Henning Nielsen | Handelsstandens BK | 8 |
| 11 | (Denmark) Robert Kragh | Valby BK | 7 |
| 12 | (Denmark) Oskar Olsen | Hellerup IK | 6 |
| 12 | (Denmark) William Nicolaisen | Østerbros BK | 6 |
| 14 | (Denmark) Charles Nielsen | Østerbros BK | 5 |
| 14 | (Denmark) Børge Nielsen | Frederiksberg BK | 5 |
| 16 | (Denmark) Aage Christensen | BK Standard | 4 |
| 16 | (Denmark) Kaj Petersen | Handelsstandens BK | 4 |
| 16 | (Denmark) Folmer Nielsen | BK Union | 4 |
| 16 | (Denmark) Edvin Petersen | BK Standard | 4 |
| 16 | (Denmark) Aage Christensen | BK Viktoria | 4 |
| 16 | (Denmark) Ejvind "Møllen" Andersen | Hellerup IK | 4 |

Source: Idrætsbladet

=== Hat-tricks ===
| Player | For | Against | Result | Date | Ref |
|---|---|---|---|---|---|
| (Denmark) Hemming Nielsen^{6} | B1908 | Valby BK | 6–1 (H) | 4 September 1927 | |
| (Denmark) Reinholdt Sylvander | Hellerup IK | BK Borup | 5–1 (A) | 11 September 1927 | |
| (Denmark) Reinholdt Sylvander | Hellerup IK | BK Standard | 4–2 (H) | 16 October 1927 | |
| (Denmark) Ervind Jensen^{6} | BK Borup | Frederiksberg BK | 8–0 (H) | 25 March 1928 | |
| (Denmark) Folmer Nielsen | BK Union | Valby BK | 5–5 (H) | 1 April 1928 | |
| (Denmark) Oscar Olsen | Hellerup IK | Handelsstandens BK | 5–1 (H) | 29 April 1928 | |
| (Denmark) Ervind Jensen | BK Borup | KFUMs BK | 5–4 (H) | 29 April 1928 | |
| (Denmark) Henning Nielsen | Handelsstandens BK | Frederiksberg BK | 5–1 (H) | 17 May 1928 | |
| (Denmark) Lund Henriksen | BK Standard | KFUMs BK | 5–3 (A) | 20 May 1928 | |
| (Denmark) Lund Henriksen | BK Standard | Handelsstandens BK | 4–2 (A) | 7 June 1928 | |

- ^{6} Player scored 6 goals
