= 1927–28 KBUs Mesterskabsrække =

KBUs Mesterskabsrække
- Season: 1927–28
- Dates: 21 August 1927 – 9 May 1928 (regular season); 4 July 1928 (play-offs)
- Champions: B.93 (7th title)
- Relegated: none
- Matches: 30
- Goals: 140 (4.67 per match)
- Top goalscorer: Vilhelm Nielsen (9 goals)
- Biggest home win: BK Frem 5–0 B 1903 (20 November 1927)
- Biggest away win: BK Fremad Amager 0–8 BK Frem (6 May 1928)
- Highest scoring: B.93 6–3 Kjøbenhavns BK (29 April 1928)
- Total number of matches and goals played does not include the promotion/relegation play-offs.

The 1927–28 KBUs Mesterskabsrække was the 40th season of the Copenhagen Football Championship since its establishment in 1889, and the 26th under the administration of Kjøbenhavns Boldspil-Union (KBU). The season was launched on 21 August 1927 with a match between BK Fremad Amager and B.93 at Københavns Idrætspark and concluded on 9 May 1928 with the final match of the regular league fixtures, with the play-off promotion/relegation match being held on 4 July 1928. B.93, playing in white shirts, started as the defending league champions from the 1926–27 KBUs season. The Copenhagen FA first-tier league ran simultaneously with the inaugural edition of the 1927–28 Danmarksmesterskabsturneringen i Fodbold, in which all of the league's teams participated. All six teams in the league, including the winners and the runners-up of the 1927–28 KBUs A-række automatically qualified for the 1928 edition of KBUs Pokalturnering, while the same teams and the third placed team of the 1927–28 KBUs A-række qualified for the 1928–29 Danmarksmesterskabsturneringen.

This was the first season, that the new offside rule was implemented in the league's matches. Østerbro-based B.93 won their second consecutive title of the league and their 7th overall KBU league championship, while B 1903 also finished as runners-up for the second year in a row. Vilhelm Nielsen from Kjøbenhavns BK became the league's top goalscorer with 9 goals. BK Frem, at that time based in the Vesterbro-area of Copenhagen, secured the regional cup title by defeating the defending cup champions, B.93, in the 1927 KBUs Pokalturnering final. BK Fremad Amager finished last in the Copenhagen FA's primary football league, but managed to win the first promotion/relegation play-off match against the 1927–28 KBUs A-række winner, Hellerup IK, securing their spot in the next season of KBUs Mesterskabsrække. All league matches during the season, including the play-offs, were played at Københavns Idrætspark.

== Season summary ==
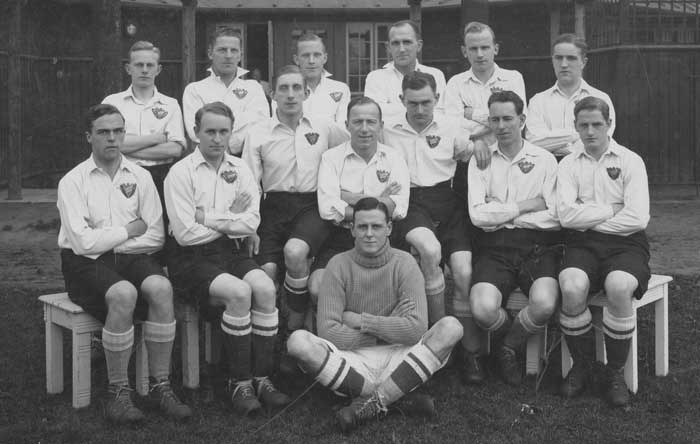
Regular league team line-up including reserves of B.93 in 1928, the winners of the 1927/28-season of KBUs Mesterskabsrække. Back row (standing from left to right): Leo Hansen, Michael Rohde, Svend Petersen, Anthon Olsen, Georg Hansen, William Gram. Center row (sitting from left to right): Ejnar H. Hansen, Fritz Tarp, Poul Zølck, Poul Jensen, Helge Scharff, Charles Jensen, Knud Andersen. Front row (sitting on grass): Svend Jensen.

The new offside rule was implemented in the league's matches this season. The newspapers speculated, that the implementation would result in several more goals being scored. During the course of the season, BK Fremad Amager appeared in three different kits — in a match against BK Frem at Københavns Idrætspark, the players of the Amager-based even had to change their outfit from red shirts/white shorts to red shirts/black shorts in the second half, because the combination were too similar to BK Frem's kit (red/blue vertical striped shirts and white shorts) in the first half.

The defending league champions from the previous season, the Østerbro-based club B.93, played the inaugural match on 21 August 1927 at Københavns Idrætspark against BK Fremad Amager, that had finished in the last spot of the league in the previous season. BK Fremad Amager had made some changes in the line-up, which now included a new goalkeeper, Heinrich Hansen, as a replacement for last season's player in that position, Schnabelrauch. The first match of the season was played in pouring rain, lightning and thunder, and although much of the football field was under water, the game was not cancelled by the referee, Cand. jur. Otto Remke (affiliated with Akademisk BK). The first goal of the match — which was attended by 3,000-4,000 spectators — and the season, was made after only 3 minutes of play by the BK Fremad Amager inner winger, Henrik Selschau, by scoring between the legs of B.93's goalkeeper, Svend Jensen.

For the new season, Kjøbenhavns BK had reconstructed their first senior team's line-up, so it consisted mostly of new and young players, having played in the youth team's league under the Copenhagen FA — only the old players, and national team player, the midfielders Valdemar Laursen and Aage Jørgensen, and the defender Steen Steensen Blicher were kept on the roster. The two teams, Kjøbenhavns BK and BK Frem, reportedly fielded the youngest rosters in the league, when they meet each other in their first season match on 11 September 1927 at Københavns Idrætspark. The match originally ended in a 1–1 draw, but Kjøbenhavns Boldspil-Union (KBU) later administratively changed the score to 0–0! and awarded Kjøbenhavns BK the game as a 2 points victory due to the BK Frem player Eiler Holm being used illegally after having played on the club's reserve team earlier in the fall of 1927.

The match schedule for the league's spring season was published on 3 January 1928 by the Copenhagen FA. Following the conclusion of the fall season, B.93 was the best placed club with 8 points for five matches, while the B 1903 player Axel Hansen was leading the league's top scorer table with 7 goals. Axel Hansen did not manage to score any goals in the spring season. Vilhelm Nielsen entered the team line-up of Kjøbenhavns BK late in the fall season, and hence did not play in all league matches, but still managed to score enough goals to score the largest number of goals in the league. B 1903 played their last KBU league match of the season on 1 May, finishing temporarily at the top of the league, with 14 points for 10 matches. Three matches still needed to be played before the conclusion of the league championship, where two matches involved B.93, and two matches involved BK Fremad Amager. While B.93 could still secure their second consecutive title of the league and their 7th overall KBU league championship by winning their last two matches, BK Fremad Amager also had to possibility to avoid the relegation play-off matches at the end of the season by securing three points in their last two matches. The season's last regular league match involved both clubs and was won by the white shirts, B.93.

== League table ==
A total of six teams were contesting the league, all 6 sides from the 1926–27 season. A double round-robin schedule was used as every team played two games against each other team, one at home and one away. Teams received two points for a win and one point for a draw. If two or more teams were tied on points, places were determined by goal average. The team with the most points were crowned champions, while the team with the fewest points would enter a promotion/relegation play-off.

Pos	Team	Pld	W	D	L	GF	GA	GR	Pts	Promotion, qualification or relegation
1	B.93 (C)	10	6	3	1	27	15	1.800	15	Qualification for the 1928–29 Danmarksmesterskabsturneringen
2	B 1903	10	5	4	1	26	21	1.238	14	Qualification for the 1928–29 Danmarksmesterskabsturneringen
3	BK Frem	10	6	1	3	32	16	2.000	13	Qualification for the 1928–29 Danmarksmesterskabsturneringen
4	Kjøbenhavns BK	10	4	0	6	24	24	1.000	8	Qualification for the 1928–29 Danmarksmesterskabsturneringen
5	Akademisk BK	10	2	2	6	14	24	0.583	6	Qualification for the 1928–29 Danmarksmesterskabsturneringen
6	BK Fremad Amager (O)	10	2	0	8	16	39	0.410	4	Qualification to the Promotion/relegation play-offs & 1928–29 Danmarksmesterskabsturneringen

Rules for classification: 1) Points
(C) Champions; (O) Play-off winners

== Results ==
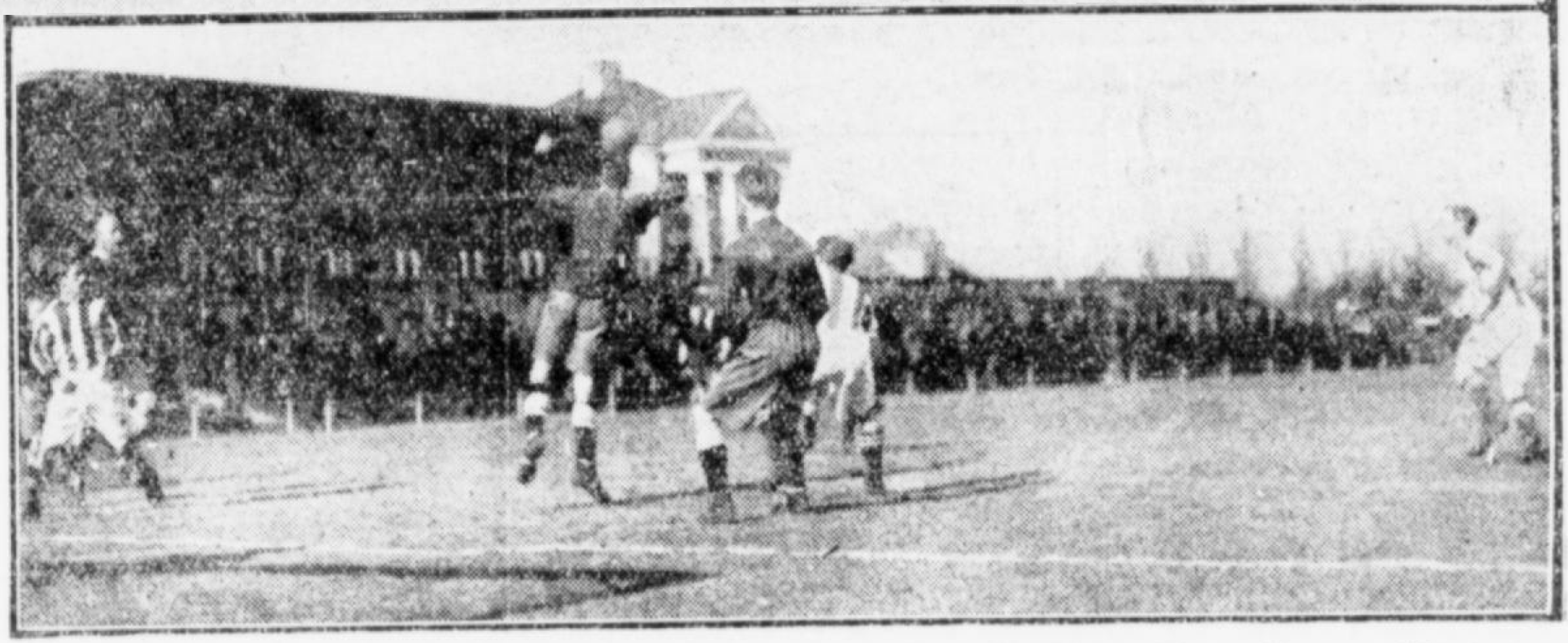
Match action in the first KBU league match of 1928 between Akademisk BK vs Kjøbenhavns BK on 18 March played at Københavns Idrætspark.

Home \ Away	ABK	B93	B03	BKF	BFA	KBK
Akademisk BK	—	0–0	2–4	1–2	2–1	0–4
B.93	2–0	—	2–2	3–2	2–1	6–3
B 1903	2–2	1–1	—	4–4	5–1	3–2
BK Frem	3–1	4–1	5–0	—	2–5	2–1
BK Fremad Amager	3–2	1–7	1–2	0–8	—	2–4
Kjøbenhavns BK	3–4	1–3	1–3	0–0 (Note: The match between Kjøbenhavns BK and BK Frem played on 11 September 1927 originally ended in a 1–1 tie. Kjøbenhavns Boldspil-Union (KBU) later changed the score to 0–0! and awarded Kjøbenhavns BK the game as a 2 points victory due to the BK Frem player Eiler Holm being used illegally after having played on the club's reserve team earlier in the fall of 1927.)	5–1	—

Legend: Blue = home team win; Yellow = draw; Red = away team win.
For upcoming matches, an "a" indicates there is an article about the rivalry between the two participants.

== Season statistics ==
=== Top scorers ===
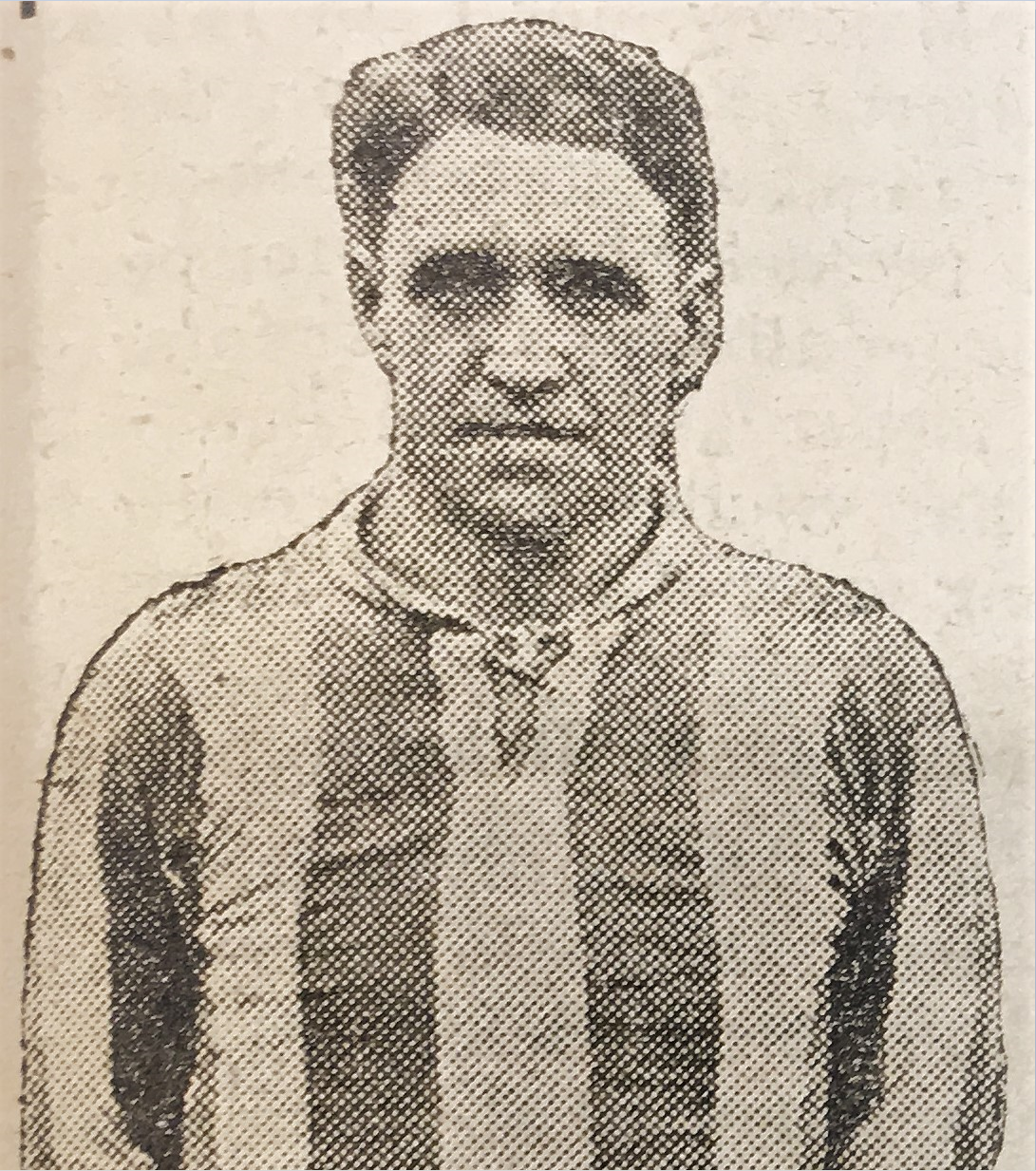
The league's top goalscorer in the 1927/28 season with 9 goals, Vilhelm Nielsen, of Kjøbenhavns BK.

Vilhelm Nielsen of Kjøbenhavns BK scored a total of 9 goals during the season, becoming the leading top scorer of the league at the end of the season. Pauli Jørgensen from BK Frem scored an equal number of goals during the season, but the goal, that the centre forward scored on 11 September 1927 in the match between Kjøbenhavns BK and BK Frem, is not included in the scoring list, because the match's final score was later changed to 0–0! by the Kjøbenhavns Boldspil-Union (KBU), and neither team's goals count in KBU's archives. Pauli Jørgensen are hence listed in second place with 8 goals on the list, together with his teammate Henri Olsen and B.93's top scorer in the league, the forward Michael Rohde.

Rank	Player	Club	Goals
1	(Denmark) Vilhelm Nielsen	Kjøbenhavns BK	9
2	(Denmark) Pauli Jørgensen	BK Frem	8 ^{‡}
2	(Denmark) Henri Olsen	BK Frem	8
2	(Denmark) Michael Rohde	B.93	8
5	(Denmark) Axel Hansen	B 1903	7
5	(Denmark) Carl "Skoma'r" Hansen	B 1903	7
7	(Denmark) Kaj Uldaler	BK Frem	6
7	(Denmark) Georg Hansen	B.93	6
9	(Denmark) Magnus Simonsen	B.93	5
9	(Denmark) Gabriel Ejrnæs	Akademisk BK	5
9	(Denmark) Knud Kastrup	BK Fremad Amager	5
9	(Denmark) Ernst Quick	BK Fremad Amager	5
13	(Denmark) Carl Stoltz	BK Frem	4
13	(Denmark) Holger "Dirk" Asmussen	Kjøbenhavns BK	4
13	(Denmark) Ernst Nilsson	B 1903	4
13	(Denmark) Eyolf Kleven	Akademisk BK	4
17	(Denmark) Oscar Jørgensen	Kjøbenhavns BK	3 ^{‡}
17	(Denmark) Sofus Johansen	BK Frem	3
17	(Denmark) Anthon Olsen	B.93	3
17	(Denmark) Henry Hansen	B 1903	3
17	(Denmark) Georg Thaarup	Kjøbenhavns BK	3

Source: Idrætsbladet
^{‡}: The goals scored by Pauli Jørgensen and Oscar Jørgensen in the match on 11 September 1927 between Kjøbenhavns BK and BK Frem, are not included, because Kjøbenhavns Boldspil-Union (KBU) later changed the score to 0–0!

=== Hat-tricks ===
Player	For	Against	Result	Date	Ref
(Denmark) Magnus Simonsen^{5}	B.93	BK Fremad Amager	7–1 (A)	21 August 1927	
(Denmark) Axel Hansen^{4}	B 1903	Akademisk BK	4–2 (A)	11 September 1927	
(Denmark) Axel Hansen	B 1903	BK Fremad Amager	5–1 (H)	25 September 1927	
(Denmark) Michael Rohde	B.93	Kjøbenhavns BK	3–1 (A)	16 October 1927	
(Denmark) Vilhelm Nielsen	Kjøbenhavns BK	BK Fremad Amager	4–2 (H)	20 November 1927	
(Denmark) Henri Olsen^{4}	BK Frem	BK Fremad Amager	8–0 (A)	6 May 1928	
(Denmark) Pauli Jørgensen	BK Frem	BK Fremad Amager	8–0 (A)	6 May 1928	

- ^{4} Player scored 4 goals
- ^{5} Player scored 5 goals

== Promotion/relegation play-offs ==
The 6th-placed team of the 1927–28 KBUs Mesterskabsrække met the winners of the 1927–28 KBUs A-række for a spot in the next season of the KBUs Mesterskabsrække. The rules, that had been implemented from the beginning of the 1923–24 season, were designed so that winners of the KBUs A-række had to obtain at least three points (two points for a win, 1 point for a tie and 0 points for a loss) over the course of two play-off matches in order for the team to gain promotion. BK Fremad Amager won the first play-off match against Hellerup IK with the score 3–1 (all scored in the first half of the game) and both clubs therefore remained in their respective tiers for the 1928/29–season – voiding a second play-off match. The Hellerup IK forward and captain Ejnar Nilsson got a strain after only three minutes of play, but choose to continue playing, giving the Hellerup team a handicap having to basically play as only 10 men for the remaining part of the match. Fremad Amager dominated the match start to finish. The second play-off match would have been played no later than 15 July 1928.

4 July 1928
19:00 CEST

BK Fremad Amager	3 – 1	Hellerup IK
Harald Ahrensberg 12'; Henrik Selschau 32'; Ernst Quick 35'		Knud Sørensen 20'

Københavns Idrætspark, Copenhagen
Attendance: 4,500
Referee: Lauritz Andersen (BK Velo)

BK Fremad Amager	Hellerup IK

GK	Viggo Petersen
DF	Oscar Starup
DF	Torsten Carlsen
MF	Otto Larsen
MF	Aage Andersen
MF	Knud Petersen
FW	Henrik Selschau
FW	Janus Kastrup
FW	Ernst Quick
FW	Harald Ahrensberg
FW	Eiler Krak

GK	Henry Schnabelrauch
DF	Alf Nilsson
DF	Per Kjærgaard
MF	Poul Petersen
MF	William Kirkland
MF	Louis Olsen
FW	Ejnar Nilsson (Captain)
FW	Knud Sørensen
FW	Oscar Olsen
FW	Claude Vincent
FW	Ejvind "Møllen" Andersen

Match rules

- 90 minutes.
- New match if tied.
- New match if win for Hellerup IK.
