= 1912 Copenhagen Football Championship =

Danish National Football Tournament
- Season: 1912

Statistics of Copenhagen Football Championship in the 1912 season.

== Overview ==
It was contested by 6 teams, and Kjøbenhavns Boldklub won the championship.

== League standings ==
Pos	Team	Pld	W	D	L	GF	GA	GR	Pts
1	Kjøbenhavns Boldklub	5	4	1	0	16	4	4.000	9
2	Boldklubben af 1893	5	4	0	1	18	6	3.000	8
3	Boldklubben Frem	5	3	1	1	14	10	1.400	7
4	Boldklubben 1903	5	2	0	3	11	19	0.579	4
5	Velo Hellerup	5	0	1	4	4	16	0.250	1
5	Akademisk Boldklub	5	0	1	4	7	15	0.467	1
