= Axel Hansen =

- Axel Hansen (cyclist)
- Axel Hansen (footballer)
