= 1907–08 KBUs A-række =

KBUs A-række
- Season: 1907–08

Statistics of Copenhagen Football Championship in the 1907/1908 season.

== Overview ==
It was contested by 5 teams, and Boldklubben af 1893 won the championship.

== League standings ==
Pos	Team	Pld	W	D	L	GF	GA	GR	Pts
1	Boldklubben af 1893	8	5	1	2	28	16	1.750	11
2	Akademisk Boldklub	8	5	0	3	20	17	1.176	10
2	Kjøbenhavns Boldklub	8	5	0	3	24	13	1.846	10
4	Boldklubben Frem	8	3	1	4	18	20	0.900	7
5	Olympia	8	1	0	7	6	30	0.200	2
