= 1905–06 KBUs Fodboldturnering =

KBUs Fodboldturnering
- Season: 1905–06

Statistics of Copenhagen Football Championship in the 1905/1906 season.

== Overview ==
It was contested by 5 teams, and Boldklubben af 1893 won the championship.

== League standings ==
Pos	Team	Pld	W	D	L	GF	GA	GR	Pts
1	Boldklubben af 1893	8	7	0	1	45	12	3.750	14
2	Boldklubben Frem	8	5	1	2	29	17	1.706	11
3	Olympia	8	4	2	2	29	28	1.036	10
4	Akademisk Boldklub	8	2	1	5	26	33	0.788	5
5	Østerbros BK	8	0	0	8	12	51	0.235	0
