= 1903–04 KBUs Fodboldturnering =

KBUs Fodboldturnering
- Season: 1903–04

Statistics of Copenhagen Football Championship in the 1903/1904 season.

== Overview ==
It was contested by 5 teams, and Boldklubben Frem won the championship.

== League standings ==
Pos	Team	Pld	W	D	L	GF	GA	GR	Pts
1	Boldklubben Frem	8	5	2	1	28	13	2.154	12
2	Kjøbenhavns Boldklub	8	4	2	2	21	12	1.750	10
3	Boldklubben af 1893	8	3	1	4	16	19	0.842	7
3	Akademisk Boldklub	8	3	1	4	18	24	0.750	7
5	Østerbros BK	8	0	4	4	8	23	0.348	4
