= Copenhagen Series =

Københavnsserien for Herrer
- Founded: 1889; 137 years ago
- First season: 1889–90
- Country: Denmark
- Confederation: Danish FA (1889–1903); DBU Copenhagen (1903–present)
- Number of clubs: 14 (from 1993)
- Level on pyramid: 6 (from 2021)
- Promotion to: Denmark Series (3 divisions)
- Relegation to: Series 1, group 1 (first teams); Series 1, group 2 (reserve teams); Bornholm Series (DBUB teams)
- Domestic cup(s): KBUs Pokalturnering (1910–1953); Danish Cup (1954–present)
- Current champions: Skovshoved (5th title) (2024–25)
- Most championships: Kjøbenhavns BK (17 titles)

Copenhagen Series for men (Danish: Københavnsserien for Herrer; Herre Københavnsserien), unofficially also known as Københavnerserien and often shortened to KS serien and KS Herre, is the highest division for men organised by the regional football association DBU København (DBUK) and one of the sixth-highest divisions overall in the Danish football league system.

The league, deciding the Copenhagen Football Championship (Danish: Københavnsmesterskabet i fodbold), was introduced as a tournament exclusively for amateur clubs located in Copenhagen beginning with the 1889–90 season under the auspices of the Danish Football Association (DBU). With the formation of a regional association for the Copenhagen area in 1903, the administration of the league was handed over to the newly founded Københavns Boldspil-Union (KBU). At the time of the league's inception, it was the top flight of the Danish football league system featuring the best teams in the country, but it has since been moved to its current status as the sixth best level in Danish football, after a long period as the fifth best level, and now features lower ranking amateur clubs from the Copenhagen area and Bornholm including the reserve squads of clubs playing at the Danish third league tier or above.

The division has changed its name on numerous occasions. It has previously been known as Fodboldturneringen (1889/90–1905/06), A-rækken (1906/07–1919/20; or KBUs A-række, Række A1), Mesterskabsrækken (1920/21–1935/36; or KBUs Mesterskabsrække to distinguish it from the other regional leagues; unofficially shortened to Mesterrækken), A-rækken (1936/37–1946/47), Københavnsserien A and Københavnsserien B (1947/48–1977; groups A and B respectively), before settling with the current name of Københavnsserien beginning with the 1978-season, eventually being known as Københavnsserien for Herrer since the 1985-season to distinguish it from the women's corresponding regional league.

== History ==
Only clubs located in Copenhagen participated in the tournaments organised by the Danish Football Association (DBU) from the foundation in 1889 until 1903, when the regional football association, Copenhagen Football Association (KBU) was formed and took over the administration of all Copenhagen-related activities including the tournaments. In the first 14 years under the auspices of the DBU, the participants played once or twice against everyone in a league format (unlike the cup-format used for the Medaille-Fodbold-Turneringen held in 1888) and the season was usually initiated in November and lasted until March the following year. Akademisk Boldklub was the most successful team in the DBU-era with six championship titles. In October 1889, the association invited the potential participants to join its first football tournament, simply named Football Tournament or Fodboldturneringen. At the time of the league's inception, it was the top flight of the Danish football league system featuring the best teams in the country, but the league winners are not considered official Danish champions.

At the Copenhagen FA's general meeting on 26 February 1920, a new tournament system was adopted. KBU's highest division, A-rækken, was renamed Mesterskabsrækken with the five biggest teams all owners of a football field (Kjøbenhavns Boldklub, Akademisk Boldklub, Boldklubben af 1893, Boldklubben Frem and Boldklubben 1903) under KBU as participants, while the name A-rækken was retained for KBU's second highest division, containing teams not owning a football field, and the third highest league became B-rækken, all tournaments consisting of a first, second and third team tournament. At the same time, the promotion and relegation rules between the Mesterrækken and the new A-rækken were overhauled making it more difficult for winners of A-rækken to achieve a promotion. In 1936, KBU's highest division, Mesterskabsrækken, was dissolved as a result of the introduction to the double format to the nationwide leagues organized by the Danish Football Association (DBU), allowing KBU's previous second level league, A-rækken, to become the new highest division involving 16 first teams.

From 1912 to 1927 the league served as the Copenhagen qualifier for the Landsfodboldturneringen, a national playoff to elect a Danish Champion. The Landsfodboldturneringen was won by a team from Copenhagen all the times contested. From 1927 to 1936 it coexisted with the Danmarksturneringen i fodbold with the best Copenhagen teams competing in both competitions.

With the formation of Denmark Series, beginning with the 1966-season, reserve teams were now allowed to participate at the fourth level. Between 1966 and 1977, the winner of the regular league (group A) played two playoff matches against the highest placed qualified reserve league team (group B) for one promotion spot to Denmark Series. The overall loser of the two matches entered the additional home and away playoff matches against the runners-up of the Zealand Series for the right to enter Denmark Series. The winners of the regular league managed to secure their spot in the Denmark Series by winning in the seasons between 1967 and 1973, while teams originating from the reserve league won promotion the other years. From the 1978-season the two divisions were merged into one regular league, features both first teams and reserve teams.

== Competition format ==
Below is a complete record of the number of teams in each season throughout the league's history (not including group 2 between 1947/48 and 1977):

Primary league entrants (1889/90–present)

- 3 clubs: 1894/95–95/96
- 5 clubs: 1891/92–93/94, 1896/97, 1899/1900–1903/04, 1905/06–1907/08, 1920/21–22/23
- 6 clubs: 1897/98–98/99, 1904/05, 1908/09–17/18, 1923/24–29/30
- 7 clubs: 1889/90–90/91, 1918/19–19/20
- 8 clubs: 1930/31–35/36
- 10 clubs: 1947/48–1964, 1969–72
- 12 clubs: 1965–68, 1973–77, 1980–81, 1983–88, 1992
- 13 clubs: 1979, 1982
- 14 clubs: 1978, 1989–91, 1993–2008s, 2009s–present
- 16 clubs: 1936/37–46/47
- Transition tournament: 2008f

Reserve league entrants (1947/48–1977)

- 10 clubs: 1947/48–52/53, 1954/55–1958
- 11 clubs: 1953/54, 1969
- 12 clubs: 1959–63, 1965–66, 1968, 1970–77
- 13 clubs: 1964, 1967

A single round-robin schedule was used between the seasons 1889/90 and 1891/92, 1896/97–97/98 and 1930/31–1946/47, while a double round-robin schedule have been used in the early seasons between 1892/93 and 1895/96, between 1898/99 and 1929/30, and again since the 1947/48-season. The 1956/57-season was a transition season, where each team met each other three times during the tournament. Until the 1994-season, a win equaled 2 points and a draw 1 point, which changed from the 1995-season, where a win earned the team 3 points. From the 1947/48-season to the 1997-season, an additional league on the same level as the Københavnsserien was present, but only reserve teams for higher ranking teams could participate, while first teams were placed in group A. The 2008 fall-season was a transition tournament.

== Copenhagen Championship winners ==
The winner in a given season wins the Copenhagen Championship and is automatically promoted to the Denmark Series. The runner-up enters a home/away promotion playoff against teams from the highest leagues of the other regional associations for the right to enter the Denmark Series. Teams placing in the bottom are automatically relegated to either the Series 1, group 1 (first team), Series 1, group 2 (reserve teams) or Bornholm Series (teams belonging to DBU Bornholm). Depending on the number of teams, that are members of FBU Funen, relegated from Denmark Series, the number of teams relegated to Series 1 will be either increased or decreased.

=== The Football Tournament/Fodboldturneringen (1889–1906) ===
Season	Level	Champions	Runners-up	Ref
1889–90	1 (Note: Between 1889 and 1912, there was no national championship playoff and the regional championships, were the highest level, that the clubs could reach, so in principle level 1. The Copenhagen Football League later co-existed with parallel regional leagues and divisions administrated by the regional associations under the Danish Football Association.)	Akademisk BK	Kjøbenhavns BK	
1890–91	1	Kjøbenhavns BK	Akademisk BK	
1891–92	1	No winner (Note: In the 1891/92-season Akademisk Boldklub, Kjøbenhavns Boldklub and Østerbro Boldklub (merged to Cricketklubben af 1893 in 1893) finished with three wins and 1 loss (6 points) and the championship was declared a draw. No play-off match for the title was played and no championship title was awarded.)		
1892–93	1	Akademisk BK	Kjøbenhavns BK	
1893–94	1	Akademisk BK	Kjøbenhavns BK	
1894–95	1	Akademisk BK	Kjøbenhavns BK	
1895–96	1	Akademisk BK	Kjøbenhavns BK	
1896–97	1	Kjøbenhavns BK	Akademisk BK	
1897–98	1	Kjøbenhavns BK	Akademisk BK	
1898–99	1	Akademisk BK	B.93, BK Frem and Kjøbenhavns BK	
1899–1900	1	No winner (Note: In the 1899/1900-season Akademisk Boldklub and Boldklubben af 1893 both finished level on points (10 pts.) and the championship was declared a draw. No play-off match for the title was played and no championship title was awarded.)		
1900–01	1	B.93	Akademisk BK (Note: Two sources (Gandil 1939; DBU 50 years 1939) lists Akademisk Boldklub in the second place and Boldklub Frem in third place in the final table - even though both clubs finished level on points (10 pts.) in the final table.)	
1901–02	1	BK Frem	B.93	
1902–03	1	Kjøbenhavns BK	BK Frem	
1903–04	1	BK Frem	Kjøbenhavns BK	
1904–05	1	Kjøbenhavns BK	B.93	
1905–06	1	B.93	BK Frem	

=== A-rækken (1906–1920) ===
Season	Level	Champions	Runners-up	Ref
1906–07	1	No winner (Note: In the 1906/07-season Kjøbenhavns Boldklub and Boldklubben af 1893 finished level on points and the championship was declared a draw. No play-off match for the title was played and no championship title was declared.)		
1907–08	1	B.93	Akademisk BK and Kjøbenhavns BK (Note: Akademisk Boldklub and Kjøbenhavns Boldklub finished level on points (10 pts) in the 1907/08-season. Several sources usually put Akademisk BK in 2nd place with Kjøbenhavns BK in 3rd place in the final table, but it is unclear according to which criterion and tournament rules.)	
1908–09	1	B.93	Kjøbenhavns BK	
1909–10	1	Kjøbenhavns BK	BK Frem	
1910–11	1	Kjøbenhavns BK	BK Frem	
1911 fall	1	Østerbros BK	B 1903	
1912 spring	1	Kjøbenhavns BK	B.93	
1912–13	1 (Note: Danish Football Association (DBU) introduced Landsfodboldturneringen beginning with the 1912/13-season, where the winners of each of the regional association meet in a play-off cup tournament at the end of the season to decide both the provincial and national championship. This play-off tournament lasted until the introduction of the Danmarksturneringen i fodbold in 1927.)	Kjøbenhavns BK	B.93	
1913–14	1	Kjøbenhavns BK	B.93	
1914–15	1	B.93	Kjøbenhavns BK	
1915–16	1	Kjøbenhavns BK (Note: Akademisk Boldklub, Boldklubben af 1893 and Kjøbenhavns Boldklub all finished level on points (15) in the final table of the 1915/16-season. Replay matches were played to determine the championship between the three clubs, with all clubs winning one match and losing one match. The rules specified that the club with the best goals scored/against-coefficients would win the KBU championship, and the outcome of the replay matches placed Kjøbenhavns BK on top (5 goals scored; 3 goals against), B.93 as the runner-up (5 goals scored; 5 goals against) and Akademisk BK in 3rd place (5 goals scored; 7 goals against).)	B.93	
1916–17	1	Kjøbenhavns BK	Akademisk BK	
1917–18	1	Kjøbenhavns BK	BK Frem	
1918–19	1	Akademisk BK	B.93	
1919–20	1	B 1903	Kjøbenhavns BK	

=== Mesterskabsrækken (1920–1936) ===
Season	Level	Champions	Runners-up	Ref
1920–21	1	Akademisk BK	B 1903	
1921–22	1	Kjøbenhavns BK	BK Frem	
1922–23	1	BK Frem	B.93	
1923–24	1	B 1903	Kjøbenhavns BK	
1924–25	1	Kjøbenhavns BK	Akademisk BK	
1925–26	1	B 1903	B.93	
1926–27	1	B.93	B 1903	
1927–28	2 (Note: In 1927, the Danmarksturneringen i fodbold replaced the Landsfodboldturneringen, introducing a single national league level composed of five districts and with a play-off tournament at the end of the season to decide both the provincial and national championship that specific season. Teams qualified for the national tournament based on their regional league results from the previous season.)	B.93	B 1903	
1928–29	2	Kjøbenhavns BK	BK Frem	
1929–30	3 (Note: After two years with a single national level divided into five districts, the "Danmarksturneringen i fodbold" was reorganized into two national leagues with a single round-robin schedule each located at different levels, one championship league (Mesterskabsserien) and one promotion league (Oprykningsserien), beginning with the 1929/30-season.)	B.93	B 1903	
1930–31	3	B 1903	Kjøbenhavns BK	
1931–32	3	B.93	B 1903	
1932–33	3	BK Frem	B.93 and Kjøbenhavns BK (Note: Three clubs finished level on points in the final table for the 1932/33-season. Boldklubben Frem was awarded the championship due to the club's victories against the other two teams having 10 points each, while no replay match was played between Boldklubben af 1893 and Kjøbenhavns Boldklub to determine the second place.)	
1933–34	3	B.93	Kjøbenhavns BK	
1934–35	3	Kjøbenhavns BK	B 1903	
1935–36	3	B 1903	Kjøbenhavns BK	

=== A-rækken (1936–1947) ===
Season	Level	Champions	Runners-up	Ref
1936–37	4 (Note: The 1935/36-season of the Danmarksturneringen i fodbold consisted of two levels (with a total of three divisions) with each team playing in a single round-robin schedule and at the same time participating in the regional leagues. The 1936/37-season introduced a new third level in the Danmarksturneringen i fodbold (four divisions in total), where each division had a double round-robin schedule. The teams in the top two levels did not participate in the regional leagues, while the teams at the third levels still took part in the regional tournaments.)	Østerbros BK	Vanløse IF	
1937–38	4	Østerbros BK	Skovshoved IF	
1938–39	4	Dragør BK	unclear (Note: The available source material does not show a clear picture of the final table for the 1938/39-season, including a clear runners-up team, which a source indicate as either Skovshoved IF or Vanløse IF.)	
1939–40	4	Skovshoved IF	Vanløse IF	
1940–41	2 (Note: During World War II, the Danish Football Association (DBU) suspended the then national league structure, consisting of three divisional series, with clubs being divided geographically in regional series using a flat structure, though eliminating two levels in the Danish football league system for the entire period (1940–1945). The regional champions qualified to play in one of the regional series.)	Dragør BK	Skovshoved IF	
1941–42	2	Skovshoved IF	BK Hellas	
1942–43	2	Hvidovre IF	unclear (Note: The available source material does not show a clear picture of the final table for the 1942/43-season, including a clear runners-up team, which a source indicate as either Frederiksberg Boldklub, Vanløse IF and Brønshøj Boldklub. All three teams finished level on points (22 pts).)	
1943–44	2	Brønshøj BK	Hvidovre IF	
1944–45	2	B1908	Hvidovre IF	
1945–46	4 (Note: After World War II, the nation-wide tournament, "Danmarksturneringen i fodbold", were resumed with a 3 league-structure, which meant that all the regional championship leagues were lowered to tier 4 in the Danish football league system.)	B1908	unclear (Note: The available source material does not show a clear picture of the final table for the 1945/46-season, including a clear runners-up team, which a source indicate as either Skovshoved IF or Hvidovre IF. Both teams finished level on points (24 pts).)	
1946–47	4	Skovshoved IF	unclear (Note: The available source material does not show a clear picture of the final table for the 1946/47-season, including a clear runners-up team, which a source indicate as Boldklubben 1908, while another indicate as Hvidovre IF. Both teams finished level on points (20 pts), but with a different goalscore.)	

=== Københavnsserien A / Københavnsserien B (1947–1977) ===
Season	Level	A Champions	A Runners-up	B Champions	B Runners-up	Ref
1947–48	4	Hvidovre IF	B1908	BK Frem (II)	Kjøbenhavns BK (II)	
1948–49	4	Hvidovre IF	B1908	BK Frem (II)	BK Fremad Amager (II)	
1949–50	4	Vanløse IF	BK Hellas	BK Fremad Amager (II)	B.93 (II)	
1950–51	4	Vanløse IF	Gentofte-Vangede IF	BK Fremad Amager (II)	B 1903 (II)	
1951–52	4	Vanløse IF	Frederiksberg BK	Akademisk BK (II)	BK Frem (II)	
1952–53	4	BK Mariendal	Frederiksberg BK	Akademisk BK (II)	BK Frem (II)	
1953–54	4	Frederiksberg BK	BK Rødovre	BK Frem (II)	B.93 (II) (Note: A source displaying with the final table for the 1953/54-season of Københavnsserien B is missing. The listed team are the presumptive runner-up as the table stood after 16 rounds.)	
1954–55	4	Kastrup BK	Hvidovre IF	BK Frem (II)	B 1903 (II)	
1955–56	4	B1908	BK Rødovre	Kjøbenhavns BK (II)	BK Frem (II)	
1956–57	4	BK Rødovre	Frederiksberg BK	KFUMs BK (II)	Kjøbenhavns BK (II)	
1958	4	Frederiksberg BK	B1908	Akademisk BK (II)	Kjøbenhavns BK (II)	
1959	5 (Note: Beginning with the 1959 edition, the 'Kvalifikationsturneringen' switched from being an end-of-the-season qualifying tournament for promotion to the 3rd Division, with participation of the best regional champions, to becoming a full season league and a part of league structure of "Danmarksturneringen i fodbold". With the introduction of the new league, nicknamed '4th Division', the Copenhagen Series within the overall Danish football league system was dropped by one level.)	Kastrup BK	Sundby BK	Kjøbenhavns BK (II)	BK Frem (III)	
1960	5	Hvidovre IF	B1908	Kjøbenhavns BK (II)	BK Frem (II)	
1961	5	BK Hero	AIK Frederiksholm	Kjøbenhavns BK (II)	B 1903 (II)	
1962	5	Frederiksberg BK	Husum BK	Kjøbenhavns BK (III)	B.93 (II)	
1963	5	BK Dalgas	B1908	Kjøbenhavns BK (II)	BK Frem (II)	
1964	5	BK Hero	Kastrup BK	B.93 (II)	Brønshøj BK (II)	
1965	5	Frederiksberg BK	Husum BK	B 1903 (II)	Kjøbenhavns BK (II)	
1966	5	Kastrup BK	Østerbros BK	Kjøbenhavns BK (III)	Brønshøj BK (II)	
1967	5	Kastrup BK	Handelsstandens BK	Kjøbenhavns BK (III)	BK Fremad Amager (II)	
1968	5	BK Skjold	Østerbros BK	B.93 (II)	Brønshøj BK (III)	
1969	5	Skovshoved IF	B1908	B 1903 (III)	Hellerup IK (II)	
1970	5	Østerbros BK	BK Hellas	Vanløse IF (II)	BK Frem (III)	
1971	5	BK Hellas	Gentofte-Vangede IF	BK Frem (III)	Hellerup IK (II)	
1972	5	Dragør BK	Gentofte-Vangede IF	Kjøbenhavns BK (II)	Brønshøj BK (III)	
1973	5	Gentofte-Vangede IF	Tårnby BK	BK Fremad Amager (II)	Hvidovre IF (III)	
1974	5	Sundby BK	Husum BK	Hvidovre IF (III)	Kastrup BK (II)	
1975	5	Frederiksberg BK	Husum BK	B 1903 (III)	Vanløse IF (II)	
1976	5	BK Fremad Valby	Tårnby BK	BK Frem (II)	BK Frem (III)	
1977	5	Tårnby BK	Dragør BK	BK Frem (III)	B 1903 (III)	

=== Københavnsserien (1978–) ===
Season	Level	Champions	Runners-up	Ref
1978	5	Dragør BK	BK Standard-Kammeraterne	
1979	5	Hellerup IK (II)	Kjøbenhavns BK (II)	
1980	5	BK Standard-Kammeraterne	Kjøbenhavns BK (II)	
1981	5	Gentofte-Vangede IF	Tårnby BK	
1982	5	B1908	Hvidovre IF (II)	
1983	5	BK Fremad Amager (II)	BK Pioneren	
1984	5	Tårnby BK	Kastrup BK (II)	
1985	5	Kastrup BK (II)	B 1903 (II)	
1986	5	Sundby BK	Vanløse IF (II)	
1987	5	Østerbros BK	Vanløse IF (II)	
1988	5	BK Fremad Valby (II)	KFUMs BK	
1989	5	BK Hellas	Tårnby BK (II)	
1990	5	Ryvang FC	B.93 (II)	
1991	5 (Note: In the summer of 1991, one of the several changes to the format of the Danmarksturneringen i fodbold, was the introduction of the Kvalifikationsligaen in the spring section of the season, which meant that the levels in the overall Danish football league system was dropped by one, while at the same time being increased by one in the autumn season. This tournament format lasted until the spring of 1995.)	Brønshøj BK (II)	Gentofte-Vangede IF	
1992	6→5	Valby BK	B.93 (II)	
1993	6→5	Hvidovre IF (II)	B 1908	
1994	6→5	BK Fremad Amager (II)	Brønshøj BK (II)	
1995	6→5	BK Rødovre	Frederiksberg BK	
1996	5	Ryvang FC	Valby BK	
1997	5	B.93 (II)	Brønshøj BK (II)	
1998	6 (Note: The Kvalifikationsrækken were introduced in the spring of 1998 by the Danish Football Association as a buffer zone between the higher ranking level's autumn-spring season format and the lower ranking level's spring-autumn season formats. This meant, that the Copenhagen Series within the overall Danish football league system was dropped by one level. The tournament was discontinued in the summer of 2008 and the level of the Copenhagen Series was increased.)	Gentofte-Vangede IF	AB1970	
1999	6	BK Skjold	FK Prespa	
2000	6	AB1970	KFUMs BK	
2001	6	Jægersborg BK	Østerbro IF	
2002	6	B.93 (II)	Sundby BK	
2003	6	BK Frem (II)	BK Skjold (II)	
2004	6	Amager United	Skovshoved IF	
2005	6	Dragør BK	B 1903 (FCK II)	
2006	6	Frederiksberg BK	B.93 (II)	
2007	6	Hvidovre IF (II)	B 1903 (FCK II)	
2008	6→5	Handelsstandens BK	Hvidovre IF (II)	
2009 spring	5	NB Bornholm	Frederiksberg BK	
2009–10	5	BK Fremad Amager	Jægersborg BK	
2010–11	5	BK Frem	Skovshoved IF	
2011–12	5	FA 2000	Kastrup BK	
2012–13	5	Jægersborg BK	AB Tårnby	
2013–14	5	Kastrup BK	BK Fremad Valby	
2014–15	5	BK Skjold	BK Union	
2015–16	5	BK Fremad Valby	Skovshoved IF	
2016–17	5	FA 2000	BK Union	
2017–18	5	BK Union	NB Bornholm	
2018–19	6	KFUM	Tårnby FF	
2019–20	6	Husum BK	BK Skjold	
2020–21	6	B1903 (II)	BK Skjold	
2021–22	6	BK Skjold	Fremad Valby	
2022–23	6	Sundby BK	Frederiksberg Boldklub	
2023–24	6	GVI	Hvidovre IF (II)	
2024–25	6	Skovshoved IF	Frederiksberg Boldklub	
2025-26	6	NB Bornholm	B 1908	
