= 1909–10 KBUs A-række =

KBUs A-række
- Season: 1909–10

Statistics of Copenhagen Football Championship in the 1909–10 season.

== Overview ==
It was contested by 6 teams, and Kjøbenhavns Boldklub won the championship.

== League standings ==
Pos	Team	Pld	W	D	L	GF	GA	GR	Pts
1	Kjøbenhavns Boldklub	10	9	1	0	30	6	5.000	19
2	Boldklubben Frem	10	6	2	2	27	11	2.455	14
3	Boldklubben af 1893	10	5	1	4	32	22	1.455	11
4	Akademisk Boldklub	10	4	0	6	13	29	0.448	8
4	Østerbros BK	10	4	0	6	14	33	0.424	8
6	Olympia	10	0	0	10	0	15	0.000	0
