= 1906–07 KBUs A-række =

KBUs A-række
- Season: 1906–07

Statistics of Copenhagen Football Championship in the 1906/1907 season.

== Overview ==
It was contested by 5 teams, and Kjøbenhavns Boldklub won the championship.

== League standings ==
Pos	Team	Pld	W	D	L	GF	GA	GR	Pts
1	Kjøbenhavns Boldklub	8	5	2	1	24	20	1.200	12
1	Boldklubben af 1893	8	5	2	1	41	17	2.412	12
3	Akademisk Boldklub	8	4	3	1	34	23	1.478	11
4	Olympia	8	1	1	6	12	31	0.387	3
5	Boldklubben Frem	8	1	0	7	11	31	0.355	2
