= 1908–09 KBUs A-række =

KBUs A-række
- Season: 1908–09

Statistics of Copenhagen Football Championship in the 1908/1909 season.

== Overview ==
It was contested by 6 teams, and Boldklubben af 1893 won the championship.

== League standings ==
Pos	Team	Pld	W	D	L	GF	GA	GR	Pts
1	Boldklubben af 1893	10	8	1	1	52	13	4.000	17
2	Kjøbenhavns Boldklub	10	7	2	1	43	15	2.867	16
3	Boldklubben Frem	10	6	1	3	36	16	2.250	13
4	Akademisk Boldklub	10	4	1	5	23	36	0.639	9
5	Olympia	10	1	1	8	7	48	0.146	3
6	Østerbros BK	10	0	2	8	9	42	0.214	2
