= 1910–11 KBUs A-række =

KBUs A-række
- Season: 1910–11

Statistics of Copenhagen Football Championship in the 1910/1911 season.

== Overview ==
It was contested by 6 teams, and Kjøbenhavns Boldklub won the championship.

== League standings ==
Pos	Team	Pld	W	D	L	GF	GA	GR	Pts
1	Kjøbenhavns Boldklub	10	10	0	0	63	7	9.000	20
2	Boldklubben Frem	10	6	1	3	28	15	1.867	13
3	Boldklubben af 1893	10	4	2	4	33	24	1.375	10
3	Akademisk Boldklub	10	5	0	5	29	25	1.160	10
5	Boldklubben 1903	10	2	1	7	16	56	0.286	5
6	Østerbros BK	10	1	0	9	14	56	0.250	2
