= 1904–05 KBUs Fodboldturnering =

KBUs Fodboldturnering
- Season: 1904–05

Statistics of Copenhagen Football Championship in the 1904/1905 season.

== Overview ==
It was contested by 6 teams, and Kjøbenhavns Boldklub won the championship.

== League standings ==
Pos	Team	Pld	W	D	L	GF	GA	GR	Pts
1	Kjøbenhavns Boldklub	5	5	0	0	30	6	5.000	10
2	Boldklubben af 1893	5	4	0	1	26	7	3.714	8
3	Akademisk Boldklub	5	3	0	2	22	16	1.375	6
4	Boldklubben Frem	5	1	1	3	12	13	0.923	3
5	Olympia	5	1	0	4	13	28	0.464	2
6	Østerbros BK	5	0	1	4	4	37	0.108	1
