= 1889–90 Football Tournament =

1889-1890 Football Tournament
Tournament details
- Country: Denmark
- Teams: 7

Final positions
- Champions: Akademisk Boldklub
- Runner-up: Kjøbenhavns Boldklub

Tournament statistics
- Matches played: 20
- Goals scored: 113 (5.65 per match)

The 1889–90 Football Tournament season was the inaugural edition of competitive football in Demark.

Statistics of the Football Tournament in the 1889/1890 season.

== Overview ==
It was contested by 7 teams, and Akademisk Boldklub won the championship. The format was slightly unusual in that all games had to have a winner.
Therefore, if the match was level after 90 minutes, extra time was played. If the match was still level after extra time, the match was replayed until a winner emerged.

== League standings ==
Pos	Team	Pld	W	L	GF	GA	GD	Pts
1	Akademisk Boldklub	6	6	0	32	4	+28	12
2	Kjøbenhavns Boldklub	6	5	1	27	4	+23	10
3	Melchioraner Boldklubben	6	4	2	23	12	+11	8
4	Boldklubben Haabet	6	3	3	6	12	−6	6
5	Boldklubben Frem	6	2	4	14	11	+3	4
6	Østerbro Boldklub	6	1	5	7	26	−19	2
7	Christianshavn Boldklub	6	0	6	4	44	−40	0
