= Svend Erik Christensen =

Danish footballer

Personal information
- Full name: Svend Erik Kehler Christensen
- Date of birth: 17 March 1949 (age 77)
- Place of birth: Stenstrup, Denmark
- Position: Midfielder

Senior career*
Years	Team	Apps	(Gls)
1968–1970	Nyborg G&IF		
1971–1981	Næstved IF		

International career
1971–1976	Denmark U21	4	(0)
1975–1977	Denmark	4	(1)
- * Club domestic league appearances and goals

Svend Erik Kehler Christensen (born 17 March 1949) is a Danish former footballer who played as a midfielder and former referee. He played in four matches for the Denmark national team from 1975 to 1977.
