= Fremad Valby =

Football club in Copenhagen, Denmark

BK Fremad Valby
- Full name: Boldklubben Fremad Valby
- Founded: 21 August 1904; 122 years ago
- Ground: Valby Idrætspark, Valby, Copenhagen
- Capacity: 10,000 (4,400 seated)
- Chairman: Steen Pedersen
- Head coach: Morten Vinther
- League: Copenhagen Series
- 2023-24: Copenhagen Series, 5th of 14
- Website: https://www.fremadvalby.dk
Home colours	Away colours

Boldklubben Fremad Valby (abbreviated Fremad V) is a Danish association football club located in the district of Valby, Copenhagen, that also has women's association football and handball departments. As of the 2024-25 season, the club's first senior men's team play in the Copenhagen Series (level 6). The club have been playing their home games at Valby Idrætspark since 1913, at either the venue's exhibition ground or one of several adjacent football fields without a grandstand, and have been featured in their current red and white football kit design since 1910. The club has been described as a working class team focusing on amateurism and including minorities rather than having an elite profile. The senior men's team have previously played in the Danish third highest football league and have reached the third round proper of the Danish Cup.

== History ==
In 1914, the club was an integral part in the foundation of Valby Boldspil-Union (VBU) and later also participated in tournaments organized by Københavns Forstadsklubbers Boldspil Union (KFBU). The club became an extraordinary member of the Copenhagen Football Association (KBU) in 1920 and a full member in 1921, enabling the club to participate in the leagues organized by the regional organization, after a short hiatus between 1921 and 1923. The club reached the Denmark Series for the first time in 1966 and obtained promotion to the Danish 3rd Division in 1979.

Fremad Valby have played 10 seasons in the third highest football league in Denmark, during two periods 1979–1983 and 1986–1990, but have primarily played in the lower ranking amateur leagues throughout their history. Their best league result dated back to a 2nd place in the 1986 Danish 3rd Division, east group, three points from a promotion to the Danish 2nd highest football league. During their tenure in the professional leagues, the management decided to only have a squad consisting of players with amateur status. The Valby-based club have reached the third round proper of the Danish Cup on three occasions, in the 1957/58-season, the 1963/64-season and the 1982/83-season. The club's record attendance at their home ground was set in 1987, when 2,095 spectators watched the 1987 Danish 3rd Division match against BK Fremad Amager. The player with the largest number of caps for BK Fremad Valby is Steen Pedersen with 401 games, which were amounted during the 1970s and 1980s.

The club's women's youth department have been featured in two documentary series on the Danish Broadcasting Corporation (DR) in 2010 (Fodboldpigerne) and 2018 (Girls United).

== Achievements ==
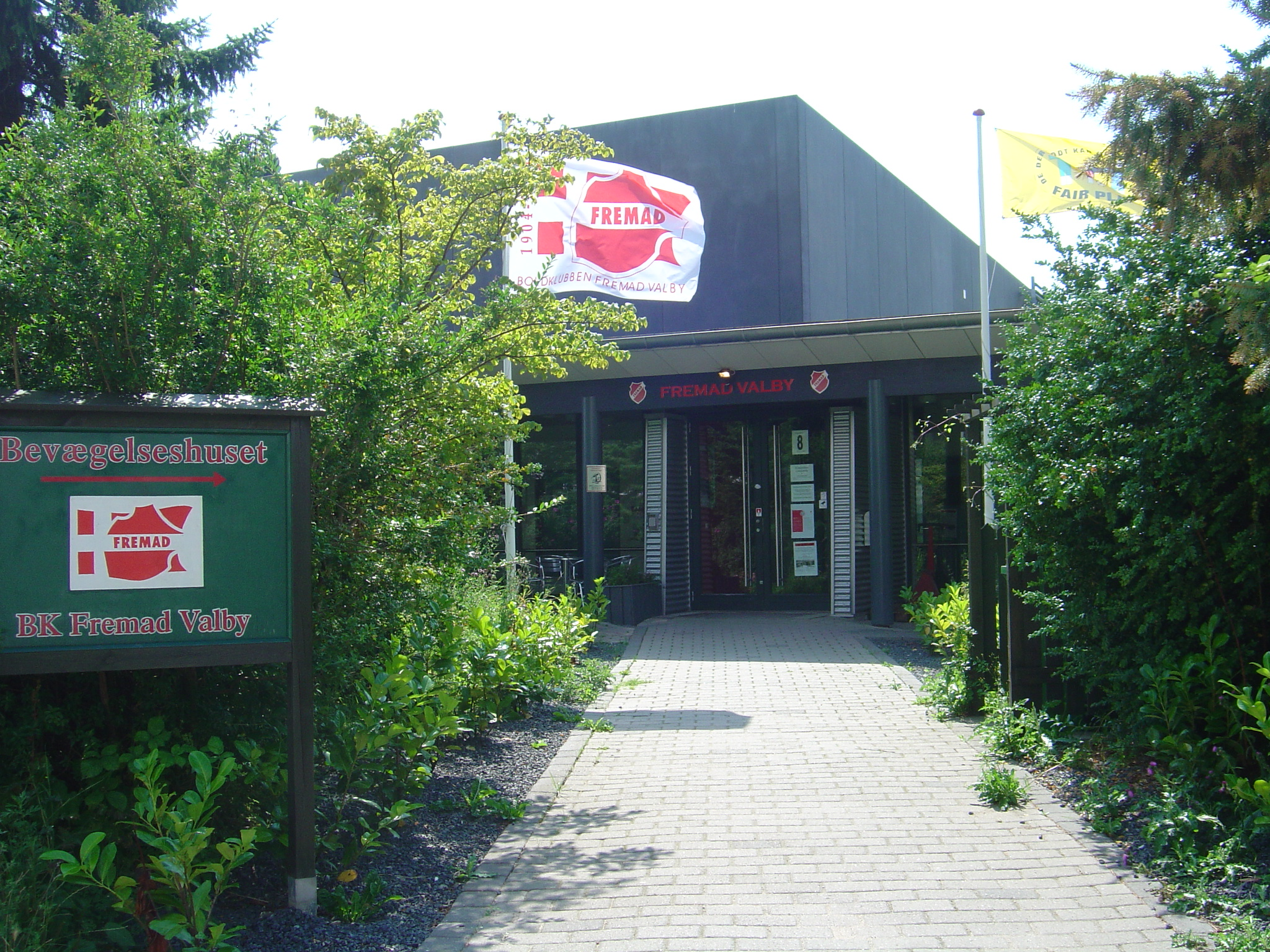
The club's 999 m^{2} large residence, named Bevægelseshuset, since its inauguration on 10 August 2001, just opposite the Valby Idrætspark grandstand.

- 10 seasons in the Third Highest Danish League
- 17 seasons in the Fourth Highest Danish League
- 38.5 seasons^{R} in the Fifth Highest Danish League
- 23 seasons^{R} in the Sixth Highest Danish League
- 9 seasons^{R} in the Seventh Highest Danish League
- Overview has been updated to include the 2019/20-season. A season is one year long.
- ^{R}: The overview details all seasons played under both the Danish FA and the Copenhagen FA since 1920, and distinguishes between participation in regional and national leagues, converted into the current situation in the Danish football league system.
