= Boldklubben Union =

Association football club in Copenhagen, Denmark

Union
- Full name: Boldklubben Union
- Founded: 2 June 1900; 125 years ago
- Ground: Genforeningspladsen, Copenhagen NV
- Chairman: Bo Sten Hansen
- Head coach: Jackie Christensen
- League: Copenhagen Series
- 2023–24: Copenhagen Series, 12th
- Website: https://www.bkunion.dk/
Home colours

Boldklubben Union, commonly known as BK Union or Union, is an association football club based in Copenhagen, Denmark, that competes in the Copenhagen Series, the sixth tier of the Danish football league system. Founded in 1900 as "Nordvestkvarterets Kristelige Ungdomsforenings Boldklub", it is affiliated to the regional DBU Copenhagen football association. The team plays its home matches at Genforeningspladsen in the Nordvest neighbourhood.

== History ==
=== Early history ===
Union has since its foundation on 2 July 1900 – where it was named NKUB (Nordvestkvarterets Kristelige Ungdomsforenings Boldklub) – had a strong affiliation to the Nordvest neighbourhood. The club's first chairman was Oscar Bremer. In 1906, the club joined DBU Copenhagen, then named KBU. Four years later, it assumed the status of joint club for the entirety of Nørrebro's YMCA (KFUM) and thus adopted the name "Union". In 1911, the club moved into the clubhouse of Københavns Idrætspark, constructed by the City of Copenhagen.

During the first decades of its existence, Union competed in the Copenhagen Series, the highest regional tier. Because Union had to share the wealth with other clubs affiliated to Københavns Idrætspark, which affected its youth department, the board sought a new home ground. Therefore, the club moved to Genforeningspladsen in Nordvest in 1955. With the move, Union achieved its own home ground and remained the only club in the area, which generated a new influx of young players.

=== Recent history ===
In April 2011, Union became a feeder club for Brøndby IF. The club had earlier delivered youth prospects such as Viktor Tranberg and Frederik Holst to the Danish Superliga side.

Union reached a milestone during the 2017–18 season, where they reached promotion to the national tiers for the first time in club history. This was achieved on 28 May 2018 after a 4–1 win over Jægersborg Boldklub.

=== Cup ===
During the 1982–83 season, the club went on its greatest cup run, reaching the third national round of the Danish Cup. They were subsequently knocked out by Kolding IF after a 0–5 loss. In the 2019–20 season, Union almost reached the same heights, but lost 0–2 to AC Horsens in the second round.
