= Morten Donnerup =

Danish footballer (born 1960)

Personal information
- Full name: Morten Welling Donnerup
- Date of birth: 26 August 1960 (age 66)
- Place of birth: Odense, Denmark
- Position: Midfielder

Senior career*
Years	Team	Apps	(Gls)
1979–1980	B 1913		
1981–1982	AGF Aarhus	55	(5)
1983	Odense BK	22	(5)
1984–1985	AGF Aarhus	41	(9)
1985–1986	Racing de Santander	29	(4)
1986–1988	AGF Aarhus	59	(9)
1989–1992	Odense BK	74	(12)
1992–1993	Vejle Bk	7	(0)
1993–1994	Nørre Åby IK		

International career
1982–1986	Denmark MNT	5	(0)
- * Club domestic league appearances and goals

Morten Welling Donnerup (born 26 August 1960) is a Danish former football player, who played professionally for Spanish club Racing de Santander from 1985 to 1986. Playing in the midfielder position, he scored one goal in 10 matches for the Denmark national football team.

Born in Odense, Donnerup started his career with local clubs Næsby IF and B 1913. He went on to play for AGF Aarhus, for whom he debuted on the Danish national team in June 1982. He had a short stint at Odense BK, before AGF sold him to Spanish club Racing de Santander in 1985. He played one season at Santander, scoring four goals in 29 games. While at Santander, Donnerup played his 10th and last game for the Danish national team in April 1986. He returned to Denmark once more, playing for AGF, Odense BK and Vejle Boldklub. Donnerup ended his career at a lower league club in Nørre Aaby.
