= Axel Hansen (footballer) =

Danish footballer (1909-1952)

Personal information
- Date of birth: 18 January 1909
- Date of death: 15 August 1952 (aged 43)

Senior career*
Years	Team	Apps	(Gls)
1927–1939	Boldklubben 1903		

International career
1927–1935	Denmark	2	(0)
- * Club domestic league appearances and goals

Axel Hansen (18 January 1909 – 15 August 1952) was a Danish footballer who played his entire career for Boldklubben 1903. He played in two matches for the Denmark national football team from 1927 to 1935.
