= Johnny Hansen (footballer, born 1966) =

Danish footballer

Johnny Anker Hansen (born 11 July 1966), known simply as Johnny Hansen, is a Danish former association football player. Born in Odense, he played as a midfielder for Danish clubs Odense BK, Silkeborg IF, and Esbjerg fB, as well as Ajax Amsterdam in the Netherlands. He played 12 games for the Denmark national football team from 1986 to 1991, and was a part of the Danish squad at the 1995 King Fahd Cup. He also represented the Denmark national under-21 football team.
