= Kastrup Boldklub =

Danish football club

- Full name: Kastrup Boldklub (mother club); Kastrup Boldklub Elite ApS (professional section)
- Nickname(s): Ama'rkanerne
- Short name: KB
- Founded: 4 May 1933; 92 years ago
- Ground: Kastrup Idrætsanlæg at Røllikevej; Tårnby
- Chairman: Jackie Lauridsen (amateur & professional section)
- Manager: Dirch Lund
- League: Copenhagen Series (2024–25)
- Website: http://www.kastrupboldklub.dk
Home colours	Away colours

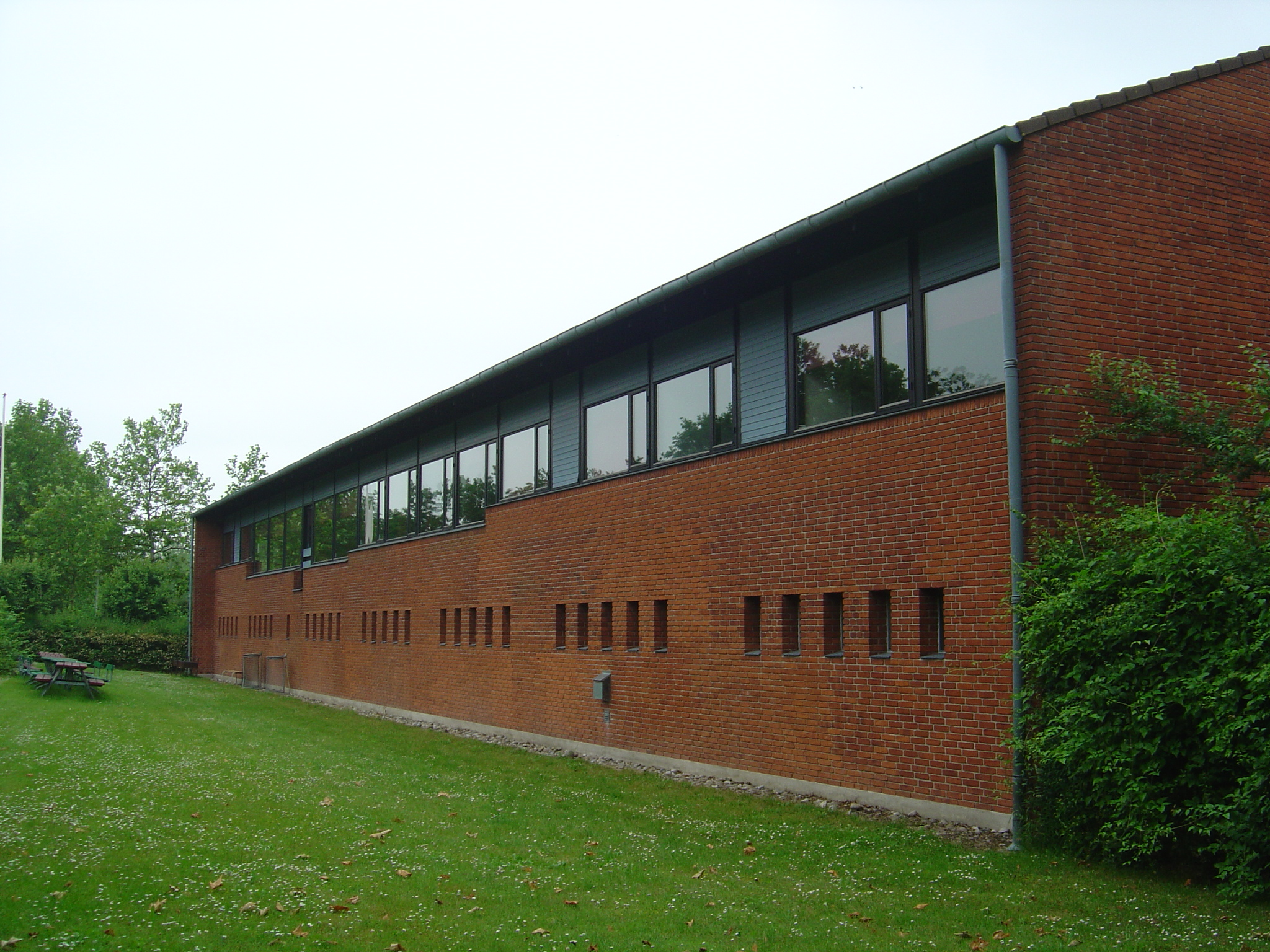
Kastrup club members' building located at Kastrup Idrætsanlæg ved Røllikevej.

Kastrup Boldklub (Kastrup BK or KB for short) is a Danish football club based in the suburb of Kastrup (Tårnby Municipality) on Amager. As of the 2024–25, the club's first senior men's team play in Copenhagen Series (level 6). The club was founded on 4 May 1933 as Boldklubben Funkis and changed to the current name in 1941. The senior men's football team have since 1985 primarily played their home games at Kastrup Idrætsanlæg located at Røllikevej, Kastrup next to the club house, but have previously played their matches at Tårnby Stadium during their tenure in the higher ranking leagues, and occasionally still do. Earlier in their history, the club was located at John Tranums Alle.

Kastrup Boldklub has spent a total of nine seasons in the highest football league in Denmark, the last in 1987. Their best result was set in the 1979 season, when the first team finished in fourth place in the top league and thus qualified for the 1980 Intertoto Cup. The club has participated in two elite superstructures, Amager United (2002–2006) and FC Amager (2008–2009) and enjoy long-standing rivalries against neighbouring clubs BK Fremad Amager and AB Tårnby (previously Tårnby Boldklub). The Tårnby-based club has fielded eight active players on the national football teams, seven youth male players for the teams of Under-17, Under-19, Under-21, Denmark national amateur football team, Denmark national B-football team, and a senior player (Adam Fogt) on the Denmark national football team, including one female player on a youth team.

== Head coach history ==
The person responsible for direction of the first senior team has traditionally been given the title of head coach/trainer.

Name	Nationality	From	To	Refs
Svend Gunnarson	Denmark	195?	1956	
Kaj Frandsen	Denmark	1 July 1956	195?	
Niels-Christian Holmstrøm	Denmark	1978	1979	
Torben Nielsen	Denmark	1 January 1981	198?	
Knud Petersen	Denmark	1980s		
Ove Petersen	Denmark	—	—	
Finn Hartmann	Denmark	—	—	
Michael Lagermann	Denmark	2003?	30 June 2009	
Kjeld Uhre Møller	Denmark	1 July 2009	2009	
Jesper Heyde	Denmark	1 January 2010	31 December 2011	
Michael Lagermann	Denmark	1 January 2012	30 June 2012	
Michael Bo Nielsen	Denmark	1 July 2012	May 2013	
Kenneth Matz	Denmark	May 2013	31 December 2014	
Per Mouritsen	Denmark	1 January 2015	30 June 2015	
Francois Pignot	France	1 July 2015	30 June 2018	
Dirch Lund	Denmark	1 July 2018	present	

== Achievements ==
- 9 seasons in the Highest Danish League
- 5 seasons in the Second Highest Danish League
- 13 seasons in the Third Highest Danish League
- 4 seasons in the Fourth Highest Danish League

== Club's honours ==
=== Domestic ===
- 2nd Division (II)
  - Winners (1): 1975
- 3rd Division East (III)
  - Winners (1): 1974
- Denmark Series (IV)
  - Winners (1): 1969 (Group 1)
  - Runners-up (1): 2015–16 (Group 1)
- Copenhagen Series (IV/V)
  - Winners (6): 1954–55, 1959, 1966, 1967, 1985^{‡}, 2013–14
  - Runners-up (3): 1964, 1984^{‡}, 2011–12
- Mellemrækken (V under KBU)
  - Winners (1): 1952–53
- Triangelpokalen
  - Winners (2): 1949, 1950

^{‡}: Won by reserve team
