= Keld Bordinggaard =

Danish footballer (born 1962)

Keld Bordinggard
Personal information
- Full name: Keld Bordinggard
- Date of birth: 23 November 1962 (age 63)
- Place of birth: Holstebro, Denmark
- Position: Midfielder

Senior career*
Years	Team	Apps	(Gls)
1981–1987	Odense Boldklub		
1985–1986	Wichita Wings (indoor)	43	(24)
1988–1989	Panionios	16	(0)
1989–1990	Vejle Boldklub		
1991	Odense Boldklub		
1992–1997	Silkeborg	143	(20)
1999–2000	Vejle Boldklub		

International career
1982–1983	Denmark U21	5	(1)
1983–1990	Denmark	4	(0)

Managerial career
- 2001–2002: Vejle BK
- 2002–2006: Denmark (assistant manager)
- 2006–2011: Denmark U21
- 2012: Silkeborg
- 2014–2015: Mainz 05 (assistant manager)
- * Club domestic league appearances and goals

Keld Bordinggard (born 23 November 1962) is a Danish former association football player. He was the head coach of the Danish national under-21 team from July 2006 until the U21 European Championship in June 2011. As a player, he most notably played professionally for Danish clubs Odense Boldklub and Silkeborg IF, both with whom he won the Danish football championship. Keld Bordinggaard played four games for the Danish national team from 1983 to 1990. He is now the founder and CEO of consulting company BORDINGGAARDFOOTBALL.

== Biography ==
Bordinggaard started his active career with Odense Boldklub in 1981. He was named 1983s "Danish Talent of the Year", and made his Danish national team debut in August 1983. Having won "the Double" of both Danish Cup and Danish football championship titles in 1983, Bordinggaard moved abroad to play indoor soccer for Wichita Wings in the United States. He returned shortly to Odense Boldklub, and played for the club until 1987.

In 1988, Bordinggaard moved abroad once more, to play for Panionios F.C. in Greece. He returned to Denmark in 1989, to play for Vejle Boldklub. In 1991, he returned to Odense Boldklub again, but left the club in order to join Silkeborg IF in 1992. Bordinggaard spent five years in Silkeborg IF, helping the club win the 1994 Danish football championship. Having initially ended his career in 1997, he returned as a player/assistant coach for Vejle BK in the 1999–2000 season.

In 2001, Bordinggaard was appointed manager of Vejle BK during the club qualified for the highest Danish league. He spent one year with the club, until he was brought in as assistant coach for the Danish national team under manager Morten Olsen in July 2002. He helped Denmark qualify for the 2004 European Championship tournament. In June 2006, he was appointed as manager of both the Danish under-20 and under-21 national teams.

In the summer of 2012, he was named new manager of Silkeborg IF in the Danish Superliga. On 11 November 2012 he was sacked following a series of poor results that led to the club being placed at the bottom of the league.

He was the assistant manager of Bundesliga side 1. FSV Mainz 05 from 2014-2015. After laying his career as a coach to rest, Bordinggaard educated himself further and began the Master for International Players with UEFA in 2015. Combined with having the UEFA Pro Licens, he is the first in the world to acquire both titles.

In 2015, Bordinggaard founded the consulting company BORDINGGAARDFOOTBALL through which he assists clubs and FAs in strategic management centering around the core of their business: football.

As of 2024 Bordinggaard works as Head of Coaching in the German club, Bayer 04 Leverkusen.

== Honours ==
=== Club ===
Odense Boldklub

- Danish football championship: 1982
- Danish Cup: 1983

Silkeborg

- Danish football championship: 1994

=== Individual ===
- 1983 Danish Talent of the Year
