= DBU Copenhagen =

Local governing body for football in Copenhagen, Denmark

- The association's logo since February 2011 with aesthetic text improvements in 2016
- Abbreviation: DBUK
- Formation: 29 April 1903; 122 years ago
- Purpose: Regional football association
- Headquarters: Svanemølleanlægget, Østerbro
- Location(s): Ved Sporsløjfen 10, 2100 Copenhagen Ø
- Chairperson: Flemming Jensen
- Website: www.dbukoebenhavn.dk

DBU Copenhagen (Danish: DBU København) is the local governing body for association football and futsal in Copenhagen, Denmark. They are responsible for the governance and development of men's and women's football at all levels in the region. DBU Copenhagen is a member of the union of local football associations, DBU Bredde, under the Danish Football Association (DBU) and the National Olympic Committee and Sports Confederation of Denmark (DIF). The headquarters is located at the Svanemølleanlægget at Østerbro after previously having their residence at the national football stadium. Clubs situated in the municipalities of Copenhagen, Frederiksberg, Gentofte, Tårnby and Dragør can be accepted as members of DBU Copenhagen. Due to historical reasons, several older clubs from other municipalities are also members of the association. As of 2020, the association consisted of 157 clubs and 45,627 members with the Østerbro-based club BK Skjold being the largest club membership-wise within the association and on a national level.

Founded in 1903 as Kjøbenhavns Boldspil-Union (KBU), the spelling was changed in 1936 to Københavns Boldspil-Union (Danish: Copenhagen Football Association). Its current name was adopted on 1 February 2011. The regional football association publishes a magazine Fodboldmagasinet København. It has four annual issues and is published in 3,500 copies. The magazine was revived in January 2005 (the first edition was released in week 6) after a couple of years without a members magazine or football magazine focusing on association football in Copenhagen and related topics. Between 2005 and 2016, the publication was named Københavnsk Fodbold, until it was renamed in 2017.

== History ==
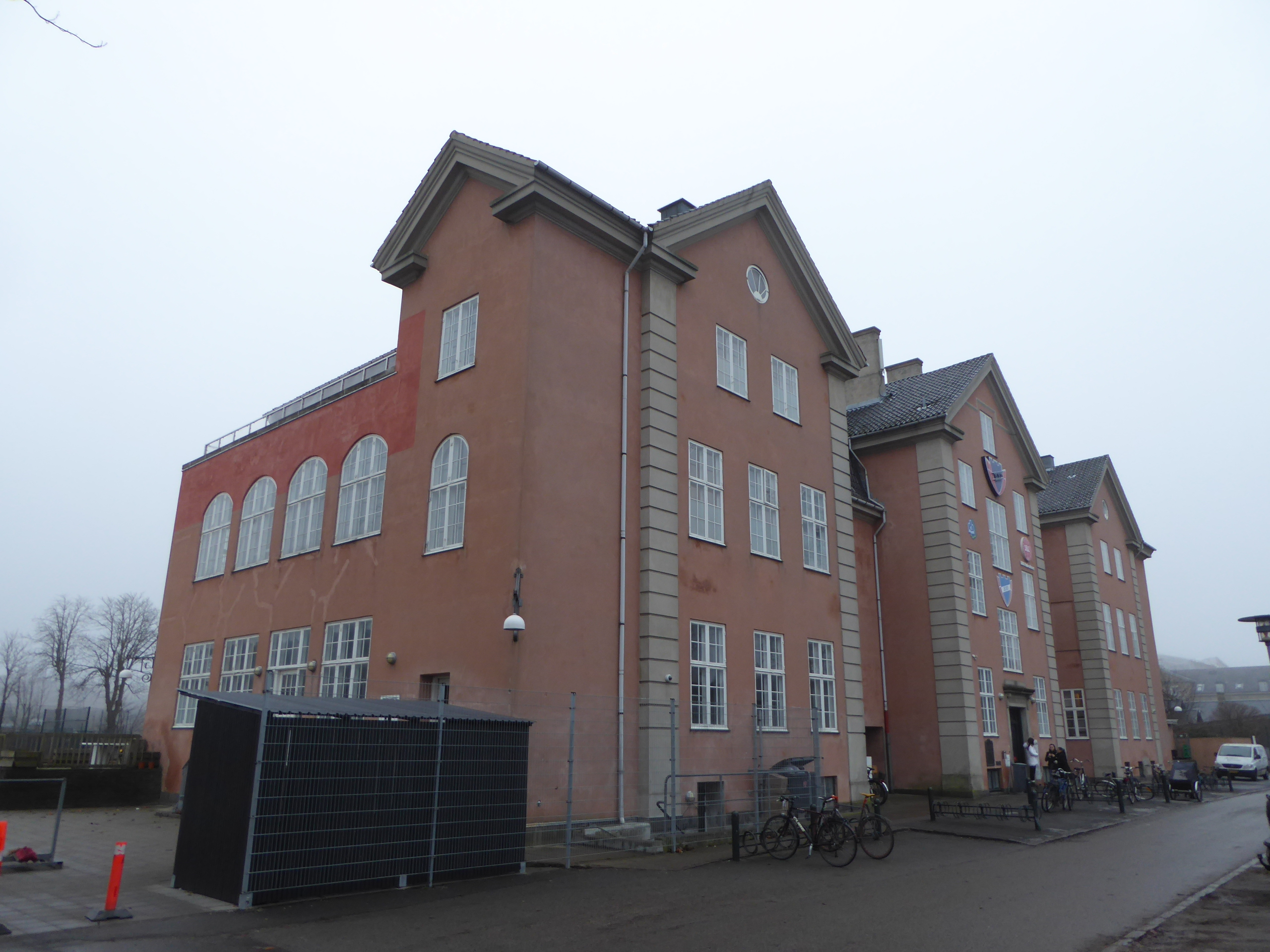
The building housing the administrative offices of DBU København is shared with a member club, B.93.

Previously, the clubs based in the Copenhagen area were direct members of the national football association, but at a DBU general meeting in 1903, the Jutland Football Association (JBU) and the dominating Copenhagen clubs agreed to change the association's bylaws, so that the Danish Football Association in practice would change their name to Københavns Boldspil-Union, while a new Danish Football Association was formed, transferring all assets and liabilities except for the right to publication of the laws for football and cricket including the cash holdings. The Danish Football Association, which had previously been an organization for Copenhagen, would now become a real national organization, while KBU would take over the football administration for Copenhagen. The 10 Copenhagen clubs, that were members of the association at that time, would become the first members of the new Copenhagen Football Association: Akademisk BK, Kjøbenhavns BK, B.93, BK Frem, KFUM København, Østerbros BK, BK Athenae, BK Lydia, BK Olympia and Frederiksberg BK. (Note: The founding member of Kjøbenhavns Boldspil-Union, Frederiksberg Boldklub (founded 24 July 1885), in 1903 is not the same as the current exiting Frederiksberg Boldklub, that was founded later on in 1912. The original Frederiksberg Boldklub left the association at the end of the 1903/04 season. Some sources mention Boldklubben Urania (originally Idrætforeningen Urania) as one of the founding members instead of Frederiksberg Boldklub, but the club did not become a member of KBU on 29 April 1903, but rather on 20 June 1903 and left the association on 18 June 1908. The original club, Boldklubben Olympia (founded 8 August 1900), was the founding member of KBU, and they were dissolved on 30 September 1909.) At the foundation on 29 April 1903, the association was named Kjøbenhavns Boldspil-Union (KBU), the spelling was changed in 1936 to Københavns Boldspil-Union and on 1 February 2011, a new name (DBU København) and logo was adopted as a direct result of the market review conducted by the Danish FA a few years earlier, while the previous name was kept as a secondary name.

In 1906, Fælledklubbernes Boldspil-Union (FBU) merged with Kjøbenhavns Boldspil-Union, when they realized that a cooperation was necessary for the future plans for Fælledparken. The football associations in the surrounding areas, Amager Boldspil-Union (founded 1912), Nordre Birks Boldspil-Union (founded 1913), Valby Boldspil-Union (founded 1913) and Nørrebro Boldspil-Union (founded 1916), merged to form Københavns Forstadsklubbers Bold Union (KFBU) in 1916 and after intense negotiations, KFBU eventually became a provisional member of KBU and ultimately in the period spanning from 1921 to 1923 the clubs from the football associations of Amager, Valby and Nørrebro became full members of KBU, while the clubs of Nordre Birk became members of Zealand Football Association (SBU).

As a consequence of the capital's increasing development and growth at the end of World War I, disagreement between the Zealand FA and KBU arose regarding the membership of clubs located at the border between the two football associations. The most general view was that clubs playing in the metropolitan area of Copenhagen should be members of KBU, while clubs in the northern part of the metropolitan area, Nordre Birk (Gentofte, Gladsaxe and Lyngby-Tårbæk) should be members of SBU. In 1945, a border agreement was signed, so KBU included clubs based in Copenhagen, Frederiksberg, Gentofte, Tårnby and Dragør, while all other clubs would become members of SBU unless they had always been members of KBU. This border agreement was formalized in 1971. This resulted in some unclear results and as a direct consequence of Akademisk Boldklub being forced to switch their membership from KBU and SBU on 1 January 1962, the agreement was temporarily terminated by KBU effective at the end of 1965, even though SBU did not accept the termination.

The organization's first residence was an office in the 'Fælledklubhuset' on the other side of the grandstand, that was part of Københavns Idrætspark. The official address was later moved to Østerbrogade, on top of the Park restaurant, before moving back to the national stadium's old north stand. The offices of the administration remained here for 40 years until moving to B.93's building at Svanemølleanlægget on 1 March 1996 due to issues with paying the yearly rent of DKK 150,000 in the newly rebuilt Parken stadium. On 17 August 2021, the representatives at DBU København voted against a merger with DBU Sjælland, DBU Lolland-Falster and DBU Bornholm to create an eastern regional football organization as part of the reform process of the grassroots organization of DBU Bredde.

=== Logos ===
In February 2011, the regional football association changed its name alongside its logo. Overview of former logos and the current:

Københavns Boldspil-Union (1940s-60s)

Københavns Boldspil-Union (50 years anniversary)

Københavns Boldspil-Union (1970s)

Københavns Boldspil-Union (1990s–2011)

DBU København
(2011–2016)

DBU København
(2016–present)

== Competitions ==
As of 2016, the football association administers the local men's senior leagues at level 5 in the Danish football league system besides women's and youth football. The top league at the local senior men's level under the football association's administration is called Københavnsserien and was regarded as level 1 in Danish football between 1903 and 1913. Before the national "knockout" cup competition, DBU Pokalen was introduced in 1954, the football association had its regional cup competitions known as KBUs Pokalturnering, Sommerpokalturneringen and B-rækkens Pokalturnering, which were all contested in various periods between 1910 and 1953. Clubs playing in the lower leagues participate in qualification rounds for the first round of DBU Pokalen.

=== Senior Men's ===
- Leagues
  - Københavnsserien (English: Men's Copenhagen Series)
  - Serie 1
  - Serie 2
  - Serie 3
  - Serie 4
  - Serie 5
  - Futsal Københavnsserien
- Cups
  - Qualification for DBU Pokalen

=== Senior Women's ===
- Leagues
  - Kvinde-Københavnsserien (English: Women's Copenhagen Series)
  - Serie 1
  - Serie 2
  - Kvinde Futsal Københavnsserien
- Cups
  - Qualification for DBU Kvindepokalen

=== Defunct ===
- KBUs Pokalturnering (1910–1953) for the highest ranking KBU clubs
- Baneklubberne Tournaments (1911) for the field-owning KBU clubs
- Sommerpokalturneringen (1931–1946) for KBU tier 2 clubs
- B-rækkens Pokalturnering (1933–1946) for KBU tier 3 clubs

== List of chairpersons ==
A total of 18 different persons have been chairman for DBU Copenhagen.

- 1903–1911: Jørgen Jensen, Kjøbenhavns BK
- 1911–1912: Johannes Forschammer, Akademisk BK
- 1912–1914: Thorsten Larsen, Akademisk BK
- 1914–1919: Peter Nicholaj Holst, B.93
- 1919–1925: Kristian Middelboe, Kjøbenhavns BK
- 1925–1931: Leo Frederiksen, Akademisk BK
- 1931–1945: Svend Berendt, B.93
- 1945–1946: Ivar Lykke, Kjøbenhavns BK
- 1946–1948: Edvin Hansen, Akademisk BK
- 1948–1954: Kurt Nielsen, BK Frem
- 1954–1970: Oscar Olsen, BK Mariendal
- 1970–1978: Erik Rasmussen, Brønshøj BK
- 1978–1992: Kjeld Hjorth, BK Skjold
- 1992–2006: Torben Mogensen, Gentofte-Vangede IF
- 2006–2017: Henrik Ravnild, BK Union
- 2017–2020: Christian Kofoed, B 1903
- 2020–2021: Jesper Gradert, Hellerup IK
- 2021–present: Flemming Jensen, Nørrebro United
