= 1928 Provinsmesterskabsturneringen =

1928 Provincial Football Championship Tournament
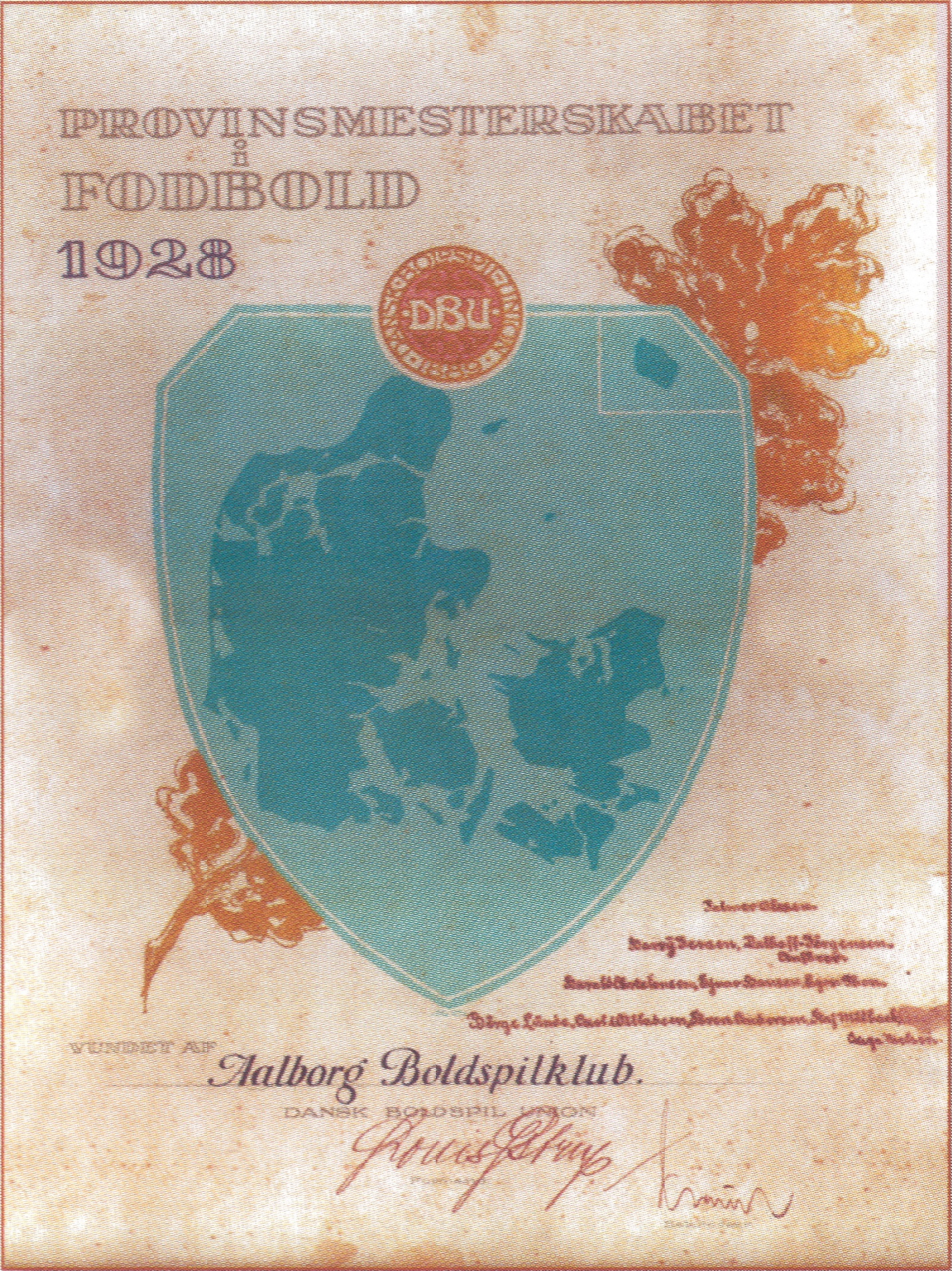
- The official diploma granted by the Danish FA to Aalborg BK for the club's championship

Tournament details
- Country: Denmark
- Venue(s): Aalborg Stadium, Aalborg
- Dates: 3 – 24 June 1928
- Teams: 5

Final positions
- Champions: Aalborg BK (1st title)
- Runners-up: Skovshoved IF

Tournament statistics
- Matches played: 4
- Goals scored: 27 (6.75 per match)
- Top goal scorer(s): Svend Strømann (Skovshoved IF); Søren Andersen (Aalborg BK) (7 goals each)

The 1928 Provinsmesterskabsturneringen i Fodbold (Unofficial English translation: 1928 Provincial Football Championship Tournament) was the 15th edition of the Danish provincial championship play-off, Provinsmesterskabsturneringen, the second highest senior cup competition, crowning the best provincial championship club of the five regional football associations outside the dominating Copenhagen football clubs, organised and financially supported by the national football organization Danish FA (DBU). This was the first edition of the tournament under its new status as a separate championship cup tournament, no longer being an essential part of the road to winning the Danish Football Championship, which it had been under the previous structure of Landsfodboldturneringen. The new Danish Football Championship structure, had its debut this season, 1927–28 Danmarksmesterskabsturneringen. Following a recommendation by the five provincial football associations, the Danish FA finally decided to re-establish a provincial football tournament in late March 1928.

The four matches in the tournament were held during June 1928 following the conclusion of each of the 1927–28 regional league championship seasons for Bornholm FA, Funen FA, Jutland FA, Lolland-Falster FA and Zealand FA. In advance of the tournament, a play-off structure had been agreed, which meant that the semi-finals consisted of two matches; on one side the senior champions of FBUs Mesterskabsrække played against the champions of JBUs Mesterskabsrække and in the other match, the champions of the BBUs Mesterskabsrække tournament played against the winners of a preliminary round between the league champions of SBUs Mesterskabsrække and LFBUs Mesterskabsrække. Initially the rules of the tournament dictated that each match should be played on a neutral ground, but only one match ended up doing so.

The tournament was won by the Jutland FA representative Aalborg BK, by defeating the Zealand FA representative and defending provincial champions, Skovshoved IF, in the championship final held at Aalborg Stadium, Aalborg on 24 June 1928. This was the first provincial championship title by Aalborg BK, who had also secured the combined regional league championship for both north and south Jutland and the regional cup title after winning the JBUs Pokalturnering this season. This would be the first time, that the city of Aalborg hosted an important national or provincial final match. The top scorers of the tournament became Svend Strømann (Skovshoved IF) and Søren Andersen (Aalborg BK) with seven goals each, scoring in all the matches, that they played in (three and two matches respectively).

== Qualified teams ==
Locations of all teams in the 1928 Provinsmesterskabsturneringen

The following five teams qualified for the tournament. This was Aalborg BK's first participation in the Provincial Football Championship Tournament, while B 1901 had participated in all previous tournaments.

Team	Association	Qualification	Participation
IK Viking	Bornholm FA	Winners of the 1927–28 BBUs Mesterskabsrække	8th (Previous: 1914–15, 1920–21, 1921–22, 1922–23, 1923–24, 1924–25, 1925–26)
B 1913	Funen FA	Winners of the 1927–28 FBUs Mesterskabsrække	3rd (Previous: 1922–23, 1923–24)
Aalborg BK	Jutland FA	Winners of the 1927–28 JBUs Mesterskabsrække	1st
B 1901	Lolland-Falster FA	Winners of the 1927–28 LFBUs Mesterskabsrække	15th (All previous editions of Provinsmester-Turneringen)
Skovshoved IF	Zealand FA	Winners of the 1927–28 SBUs Mesterskabsrække	4th (Previous: 1921–22, 1925–26, 1926–27)

== Matches ==
=== Bracket ===
Provincial t. preliminary round
10 June 1928
B 1901	2
Skovshoved IF	3

Provincial t. semi-finals
17 June 1928
Skovshoved IF	6
IK Viking	1
3 June 1928
B 1913	2
Aalborg BK	3

Provincial Championship Final
24 June 1928
Skovshoved IF	2
Aalborg BK	8

=== Provincial tournament, preliminary round ===
==== Match summary ====
The preliminary round was played between the representative club champions of Zealand FA and Lolland-Falster FA. Skovshoved IF qualified to the tournament after winning their third consecutive regional league final just one week prior to the match; their fourth Zealand League Championship in total. B 1901 qualified by winning the regional football league, LFBUs Mesterskabsrække for the 20th time in the league's history, and had participated in all 15th previous editions of the Provinsmesterskabsturneringen. The match was originally scheduled to take place on 3 June 1928, but was postponed with one week due to the late decision regarding the Zealand League Championship winner.

The only match in the preliminary round, played on 10 June 1928 at 13:30 CEST, was attended by a couple of thousands on the home field of B 1901 in Nykøbing Falster. It was reportedly described as hard played, exiting to the end and with the result of the match ending in a narrow victory of the score 3–2 to Skovshoved IF, who were playing in a blue kit. Skovshoved IF's center forward Svend Strømann scored the first goal after 25 minutes of play, which became the only goal in the first half. The 1–0 lead for the away team was equalized in the 10th minute in the second half with a goal by Holger Brodthagen, after which a colleague, Svend Aage Eriksen, scored another goal for B 1901 in the 26th minute of the second half, giving the home team a 2–1 lead. Only two minutes later Strømann scored his second goal in the match and Skovhoved IF's left inner winger Axel Guhle scored the third goal in the 42nd minutes of the second half, securing the victory for the Zealandians. A regional newspaper, Lolland-Falster Social-Demokrat (Nakskov), praised the young Skovshoved IF halfback, Hans Møller, as the best player on the football field, and highlighted his efforts of keeping B 1901's forward Svend Aage Eriksen in check during the match.

==== Match details ====
The home team was B 1901, because the match was played at their regular home turf.

10 June 1928
13:30 CEST

B 1901	2–3	Skovshoved IF
Holger Brodthagen 55'; Svend Aage Eriksen 71'		Svend Strømann 25', 73'; Axel Guhle 87'

B 1901s Bane, Nykøbing Falster
Attendance: 1,000
Referee: P. Lindholdt (Copenhagen)

=== Provincial tournament, semi-finals ===
==== Pre-match ====
The two provincial semi-finals were played between the representative club champions of Zealand FA and Bornholm FA in one match and the club champions of Jutland FA and Funen FA in the other match. Both IK Viking and Aalborg BK had received byes from the preliminary round and did not enter the tournament until the semi-finals – this was only the second time in the competition's history (last one was in the 1913–14 edition), that a team from Bornholm FA played in the semi-finals. Prior to Skovshoved IF's next semi-final match, the club's administration arranged a training match at their home ground in Skovshoved on 14 June 1928 against the first team of Akademisk BK in preparation for the semi-final match – the unofficial evening match won 3–1 by the academics of Copenhagen. Prior to the match, the newspapers predicted, that the IK Viking team would not get many chances for a victory. The line-up for IK Viking, that was going to travel overseas from Bornholm, was assembled after an evening match on 14 June 1928 between the first and second (reserves) team, that ended in an 8–0 victory, and consisted of the following players (listed goalkeeper to left wing): Vilhelm Reker, Harry Pedersen, H. P. Hansen, Niels Mortensen, Arthur Aakerlund, Harald Mortensen, Knud Hansen, Knud Christiansen, Charles Olsen, Carlo Christiansen and Carl Mortensen, while the reserve player was Edm. Larsen and the team's leader was Jens P. Pedersen.

==== Match summaries ====
The semi-final match between Skovshoved IF and IK Viking took place at Skovshoved Idrætspark on 17 June 1928 13:30 CEST in front of approximately 300 spectators and the Danish FA had assigned the well known former goalkeeper on the national football team, Sophus Hansen (affiliated with BK Frem), to be the referee at the game. Skovshoved IF's forwards had several engaging attacks in the first 30 minutes of the game, but they were all either saved by the Rønne-goalkeeper Vilhelm Reker or the attackers were lacking shooting skills, while the IK Viking's players on the other hand could not get their game and the passes to function effectively. In the last 15 minutes of the first half, the Vikings regained the upper hand and eventually got a 1–0 lead, after Charles Olsen scored the team's only goal with a one-man performance five minutes before the referee whistled for the half time break. A local newspaper from northern Zealand concluded, that away-team's positive activities were due to the strong tailwind that the visiting players had towards the home-team's goal post – an advantage that had been decided at the beginning of the match by a drawing of lots.

As a consequence of the strong winds IK Viking Rønne was able to compete on equal terms against the much stronger Skovshoved IF-players, which was emphasized during the second half. After a few minutes, SIF scored the first goal, greatly assisted by IK Viking's Niels Mortensen, whereafter they progressed in gaining the upper hand for the remaining part of the match, and were quite dominant in the last 15 minutes – a local newspaper, based on Bornholm, referred this to insufficient training on the Rønne-players' part. The Rønne-team's Charles Olsen and Karl Mortensen had some great opportunities for scoring goals, but both failed to accomplish the objective. During the second half, the home team's centerforward, Svend Strømann, scored four goals – between two and three goals using his head – while the team's right winger Ernst Sørensen and the team captain, Helmuth Thomas, each scored one goal – contributing to Skovshoved IF's victory of 6–1. According to the local Bornholm newspaper, players on both teams hailed the IK Viking goalkeeper, Vilhelm Reker, as the best player on the field.

The inaugural match in the newly refounded Provincial Football Championship was played on 3 June 1928 on a neutral football field in Randers in front of approximately 2,000 spectators, which took place two weeks after the league final in the JBUs Mesterskabsrække and over a month had passed after the final round of regular league fixtures had been played in the FBUs Mesterskabsrække. To the match, B 1913's line-up consisted of Frederik Johansen, Poul Espe, Richard Rasmussen, Harry Christensen, Børge Jensen (forward), Chr. Larsen, Martin Petersen, Knud Lindegaard, Albert Fischer (forward), Carl Hansen and Kaj Seeback, while the line-up for Aalborg BK consisted of goalkeeper Folmer Olesen, defenders Harry Jensen and Dalhoff Jørgensen (Captain), midfielders Harald Christensen, Ejner Hansen and Egon Thon and forwards Børge Lunde, Axel Villadsen, Søren Andersen, Kaj Mølback and Aage Nielsen. The Jutlandian championship club, Aalborg BK, won the semi-final match 3–2 after having obtained a lead of 3–0 after 60 minutes of play in the second half – all Alborg BK goals in the victory were scored by center forward Søren Andersen – before the Odense team was able to get in two goals. Originally scheduled to be played at Aarhus Stadium, only a few days before the first semi-final match, it was moved to Randers Stadium due to the stadium being occupied by other activities; and Peder Remtoft (Copenhagen) was assigned as referee to the match.

==== Match details ====
The home team was Skovshoved IF, because the match was played at their regular home turf.

17 June 1928
13:30 CEST

Skovshoved IF	6–1	IK Viking
Svend Strømann (2nd half); Ernst Sørensen (2nd half); Helmuth Thomas (2nd half)		Charles Olsen 40'

Skovshoved Idrætspark, Skovshoved
Attendance: 300
Referee: Sophus Hansen (BK Frem)

The home team (for administrative purposes) was determined to be B 1913 although Randers Stadium was located closer to Aalborg BK's home.

3 June 1928
14:00 CEST

B 1913	2–3	Aalborg BK
Kaj Seeback (6?); Martin Petersen 70'		Søren Andersen 10', 55', 60'

Randers Stadium, Randers
Attendance: 2,000
Referee: Peder Remtoft (Copenhagen)

=== Provincial Championship Final ===
==== Pre-match ====
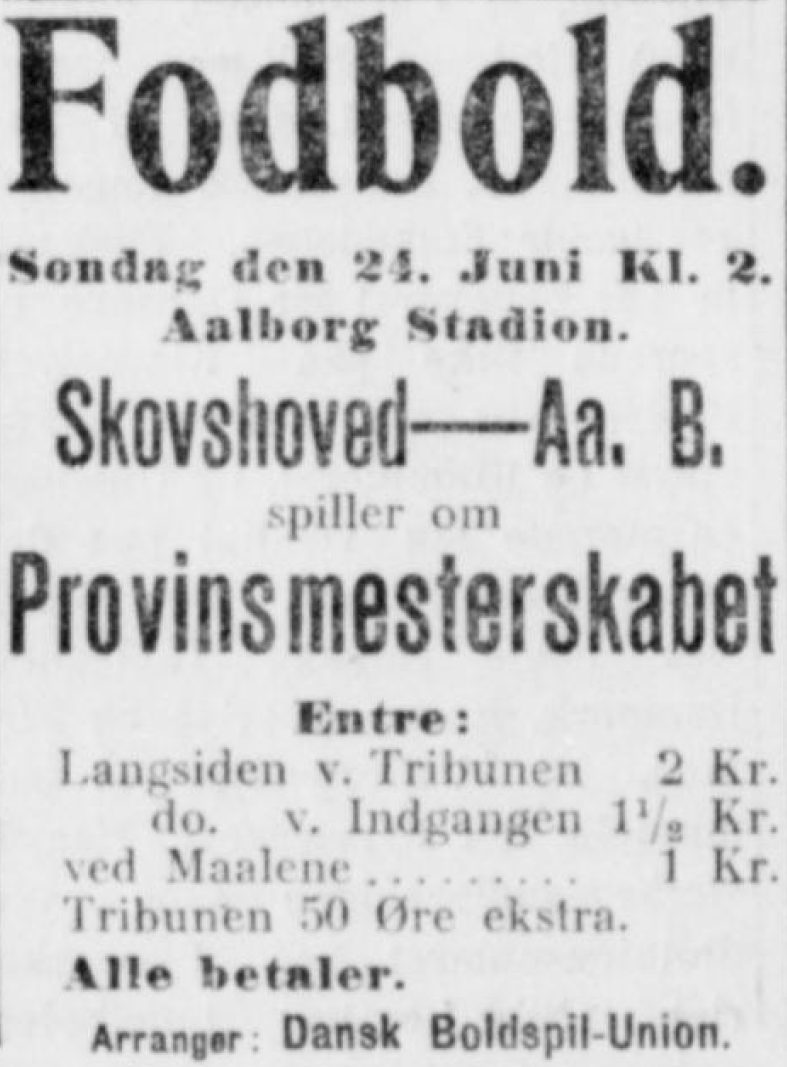
Newspaper advertisement for the final match, on 24 June 1928, between Skovshoved IF and Aalborg BK

The final of the Provinsmesterskabsturneringen was played between the representative club champions of Zealand FA, who were the defending provincial champions from the previous season, and Jutland FA, who secured their participation in this tournament by winning the combined regional league championship for both north and south Jutland, and in the same season also secured the regional cup title in the JBUs Pokalturnering. The last game in the tournament was originally scheduled to take place in Odense, but negotiations initiated by the Jutland FA tried to get the match moved to Aarhus Stadium due to expectations that several more spectators would attend the match. However, Skovshoved IF had no interest in playing in Aarhus, but on the other hand would like to play the match in Aalborg, and on 19 June the Jutland FA unexpectedly announced to Aalborg BK that Skovshoved IF had agreed to play the final at Aalborg Stadium on 24 June 1928 at 14:00 CEST and be refereed by Cand.jur. Otto Remke (affiliated with Akademisk BK). This would be the first time, that an important national or provincial final match was played as far north as Aalborg. These kind of final matches had in the previous years basically only been held in Copenhagen, Odense, Nykøbing Falster and Aarhus. The Skovshoved IF players arrived in Aalborg on the morning of the match day. Skovshoved IF played in blue shirts and black shorts/socks, while the Aalborg BK team played in their usual red and white football kit and with the entire team line-up used in the regional league championship.

==== Match summary ====
Before the match, both teams announced that they would be fielding their best players. This would be Skovshoved IF's 12th competitive match in 1928, having scored 39 times and only conceding six goals prior to the game. Aalborg BK, who had the home field advantage, won both halves of the match with the score of 4–1, but the game quickly lacked any spark of excitement. Very early in the match, the Jutlanders obtained a lead, when the forward Kaj Mølback scored a goal, but a few moments Skovshoved IF's Axel Guhle equalized for the Zealanders – after three minutes of play, the score was 1–1. For the remaining part of the first half, the Aalborg players took control of the match, increasing the score with two goals from the forwards Søren Andersen (in the 10' and 23' minute) and an additional goal by Kaj Mølback in the 30' minute. After the break, the control of the match continued, when Søren Andersen (48' and 63'), Kaj Mølback (75') and Alex Villadsen (77') further increased the lead to 8–1. It was not until the last minutes of the match, that Skovserne managed to get another in; scored by Svend Strømann.

The match has been described as the probably the best game played by the club due to winning the match in a convincing manner, while the local newspaper Aalborg Stiftstidende criticised the performance of the away team, Skovshoved IF, as being nothing better than some random village team although the club was located in the suburbs of Copenhagen in an era of the dominating clubs from Copenhagen FA. The home team was praised for the players' organisation on the field, the players knew their tasks in the formation, the ball was transferred smoothly from player to player, and the forwards unexploited their options during the match. The away team had a very different playing style, shooting long balls to the players in front, and then relied on individual efforts. At the same time as Aalborg BK's inner wing, Kaj Mølback, scored his team's seventh goal in the 75th minute, giving the team a 7–1 lead, a violent guest of wind caught the very large Dannebrog and the stadium's flagpole broke, falling to the ground with a bang, but not injuring any spectators nearby.

Aalborg BK won the Final of the Provinsmesterskabsturneringen in front of 1,800 spectators and were crowned Champions of the Provincial Football Championship (Danish: Vinder af Provinsmesterskabet i Fodbold or simply Provinsmester). Unlike the important corresponding Danish football tournaments of the era, the winning team would not be awarded a trophy, but instead received a diploma for their efforts, which had also been awarded the previous provincial champions. Aalborg BK's centerforward, Søren Andersen, was hailed as the best player during the match by two local newspapers.

==== Match details ====
Although Aalborg BK was playing on their home turf/city, the home team had been determined to be Skovshoved IF for administrative reasons.

24 June 1928
14:00 CEST

Skovshoved IF	2–8	Aalborg BK
Alex Guhle 3'; Svend Strømann 87'		Kaj Mølback 3', 30', 75'; Søren Andersen 10', 23', 48', 63'; Alex Villadsen 77'

Aalborg Stadium, Aalborg
Attendance: 1,800
Referee: Otto Remke (Akademisk BK)

Skovshoved IF	Aalborg BK

GK	Einar Jensen
DF	Rasmus Christensen
DF	Willy Petersen
MF	Hans Møller
MF	Helmuth Thomas (Captain)
MF	Johan Johansen
FW	Ernst Sørensen
FW	Axel Guhle
FW	Svend Strømann
FW	Henning Thomas
FW	Sigurd Møller

GK	Folmer Olesen
DF	Harry Jensen
DF	Dalhoff Jørgensen (Captain)
MF	Harald Christensen
MF	Ejner Hansen
MF	Egon Thon
FW	Børge Lunde
FW	Axel Villadsen
FW	Søren Andersen
FW	Kaj Mølback
FW	Aage Nielsen

Match rules

- 90 minutes.
- 30 minutes of extra time if necessary.
- Replay match if scores still level.

== Statistics ==
=== Goalscorers ===
Rank	Player	Team	Goals
1	(Denmark) Svend Strømann	Skovshoved IF	7
1	(Denmark) Søren Andersen	Aalborg BK	7
3	(Denmark) Kaj Mølback	Aalborg BK	3
4	(Denmark) Axel Guhle	Skovshoved IF	2
5	(Denmark) Alex Villadsen	Aalborg BK	1
5	(Denmark) Charles Olsen	IK Viking	1
5	(Denmark) Ernst Sørensen	Skovshoved IF	1
5	(Denmark) Helmuth Thomas	Skovshoved IF	1
5	(Denmark) Holger Brodthagen	B 1901	1
5	(Denmark) Svend Aage Eriksen	B 1901	1
5	(Denmark) Kaj Seeback	B 1913	1
5	(Denmark) Martin Petersen	B 1913	1

=== Hat-tricks ===
Player	For	Against	Result	Date	Ref
(Denmark) Søren Andersen	Aalborg BK	B 1913	3–2 (A)	3 June 1928	
(Denmark) Svend Strømann	Skovshoved IF	IK Viking	6–1 (H)	17 June 1928	
(Denmark) Søren Andersen^{4}	Aalborg BK	Skovshoved IF	8–2 (A)	24 June 1928	
(Denmark) Kaj Mølback	Aalborg BK	Skovshoved IF	8–2 (A)	24 June 1928	

- ^{4} Player scored four goals
- (H): Home match; (A): Away match
