= 1926–27 Landsfodboldturneringen =

Danish National Football Tournament

Tournament details
- Country: Denmark
- Venue(s): Københavns Idrætspark, Copenhagen
- Dates: 29 May – 26 June 1927 (final competition)
- Teams: 6 (final competition)

Final positions
- Champions: B.93 (2nd title)
- Runner-up: Skovshoved IF
- Winner of Provins-Turneringen: Skovshoved IF (1st title)

Tournament statistics
- Matches played: 5
- Goals scored: 27 (5.4 per match)
- Attendance: 9,000 (1,800 per match)
- Top goal scorer(s): Axel Guhle (Skovshoved IF) (5 goals)

The 1926–27 Landsfodboldturneringen was the 14th edition of the Danish national football championship play-offs, a Danish FA-organised club football tournament between the championship clubs from each of the six regional football associations. In advance of the tournament, a play-off structure had been agreed, which meant that the winners of KBUs Mesterskabsrække were directly qualified for the national championship final against the winner of the Provincial tournament. The semi-finals consisted of two matches; on one side the champions of JBUs Mesterskabsrække played against the champions of FBUs Mesterskabsrække and in the other match, the champions of the LFBUs Mesterskabsrække tournament played against the winners of a preliminary round between the champions of SBUs Mesterskabsrække and BBUs Mesterskabsrække.

The Copenhagen FA representative, B.93, won their second national championship by defeating the Zealand FA representative and the winner of the Provincial championship tournament 1927 (Danish: Vinder af Provinsmesterskabet 1927), Skovshoved IF (this was their first title), in the final at Københavns Idrætspark on 26 June 1927. Both the national final in Copenhagen and the provincial final in Skovshoved, north of Copenhagen, were played in pouring rain. For the national final, that was refereed by Hugo Ohlsson of Helsingborg, Sweden, B.93 made changes to their regular team line-up and fielded reserves for Charles Jensen (left back) and the club's two highest scoring footballers this season, Michael Rohde (forward) and Svend Petersen (forward). This was the last edition of the Landsfodboldturneringen in its end-of-the-season cup format, which was replaced by a year-long league format, known as Danmarksmesterskabsturneringen i Fodbold, the following season.

== Qualified teams ==
Locations of the 1926–27 Landsfodboldturneringen qualified teams.

Team	Association	Qualification	Participation
Rønne BK	Bornholm FA	Winners of the 1926–27 BBUs Mesterskabsrække	3rd (Previous: 1912–13, 1913–14)
B 1909	Funen FA	Winners of the 1926–27 FBUs Mesterskabsrække	5th (Previous: 1912–13, 1919–20, 1920–21, 1921–22)
Horsens FS	Jutland FA	Winners of the 1926–27 JBUs Mesterskabsrække	2nd (Previous: 1925–26)
B.93	Copenhagen FA	Winners of the 1926–27 KBUs Mesterskabsrække	4th (Previous: 1913–14, 1914–15, 1915–16)
B 1901	Lolland-Falster FA	Winners of the 1926–27 LFBUs Mesterskabsrække	14th (All previous editions of Landsfodboldturneringen)
Skovshoved IF	Zealand FA	Winners of the 1926–27 SBUs A-række	3rd (Previous: 1921–22, 1925–26)

== Matches ==
=== Bracket ===
Provincial t. preliminary round
29 May 1927
Rønne BK	1
Skovshoved IF	5

Provincial t. semi-finals
12 June 1927
Skovshoved IF	4
B 1901	2
29 May 1927
B 1909	5
Horsens FS	0

Provincial Championship Final
19 June 1927
Skovshoved IF	3
B 1909	2

National Championship Final
26 June 1927
B.93	5
Skovshoved IF	1

=== Provincial tournament, preliminary round ===
==== Match summary ====
The preliminary round was played between the representative club champions of Bornholm FA and Zealand FA. The Skovserne were reportedly very superior in the match against the bornholmerne — especially in the second half.

==== Match details ====
29 May 1927
14:00 CEST

Rønne BK	1–5	Skovshoved IF
Knud Thorsen 1st half'; Ove Lundsgaard 3?' (o.g.)		Axel Guhle 5', 2nd half'; Bernhard Møller 48'; Helmuth Thomas 2nd half'

Banen ved Østergade, Rønne
Attendance: 700
Referee: P. Lindholt (Copenhagen)

Rønne BK	Skovshoved IF

GK	Chr. Henriksen
DF	Ove Lundsgaard
DF	Erik Lundsgaard
MF	Hans Jørgensen
MF	Carl Haagensen
MF	Hjalmar Nielsen
FW	Erling Kofoed
FW	Ejn. Andreasen
FW	Erik Hjorth
FW	Knud Thorsen
FW	Knud Dich

GK	Ejnar Jensen
DF	Arthur Kuhlmann
DF	Rasmus Christensen
MF	Johan Johansen
MF	Helmuth Thomas (captain)
MF	Willy Petersen
FW	Ernst Hansen
FW	Alex Gühle
FW	Bernhard Møller
FW	Ernst Sørensen
FW	Sigurd Møller

=== Provincial tournament, semi-finals ===
==== Match summaries ====
The two provincial semi-finals were played between the representative club champions of Zealand FA and Lolland-Falster FA in one match and the club champions of Funen FA and Jutland FA in the other match. The match between the league champions of FBU, B 1909, and the league champions of Horsens FS (nicknamed den gule Fare fra Horsens) ended with the score of 5–0, goals all scored in the second half, after the first half had ended in a 0–0 tie in front of a record attendance of 3,500 spectators at Munke Mose in Odense (also referred to as OB's Bane; a field owned by Odense BK) including several visiting spectators from Jutland with yellow flags and/or neckties, signaling support for the away team.

B 1909 fielded the same line-up, which had been used for the regional Funen Championship replay matches in early May 1927. Fans of Horsens FS, who could no make the journey to Odense, were able to follow the course of the away match through the posting on telegram boards in the gate at the local newspaper, Horsens Avis.

==== Match details ====
12 June 1927
10:30 CEST

Skovshoved IF	4–2	B 1901
Axel Guhle 25', 8?'; Bernhard Møller 55'; Ernst Sørensen 60'		Holger Brodthagen 40'; Poul Erik 2nd half'

Skovshoved Idrætspark, Skovshoved
Attendance: 500
Referee: Sophus Hansen (BK Frem)

Skovshoved IF	B 1901

GK
DF
DF
MF
MF
MF
FW
FW	Alex Guhle
FW	Bernard Møller
FW	Ernst Sørensen
FW

GK	Chr. Andersen
DF
DF
MF
MF
MF
FW	Holger Brodthagen
FW	Leo
FW	Poul Erik
FW	Svend Aage Eriksen
FW

29 May 1927
13:30 CEST

B 1909	5–0	Horsens FS
Emil Petersen 58' (pen.); Carl Johan Johansen 64'; Hans Petersen 66', 74'; Creutz Jensen 76'

OB's Bane at Munke Mose, Odense
Attendance: 3,500
Referee: Vilhelm Jørgensen (B 1903)

B 1909	Horsens FS

GK	Aage Larsen
DF	Edmund Christensen
DF	Aage Hansen
MF	Emil Sundahl (captain)
MF	Hubert Møller
MF	Carl Larsen
FW	Aksel Petersen
FW	Hans Petersen
FW	Creutz Jensen
FW	Emil Petersen
FW	Carl Johan Johansen

GK	Regnar Jensen
DF	Tungelund
DF	E. Møller
MF	Sv. Hansen
MF	Svend Aage Jacobsen
MF	M. Grønlund
FW	Mellerup
FW	Carl Jensen
FW	Viggo Sørensen
FW	N. Chr. Sørensen
FW	Bülow

=== Provincial Championship Final ===
==== Match summary ====
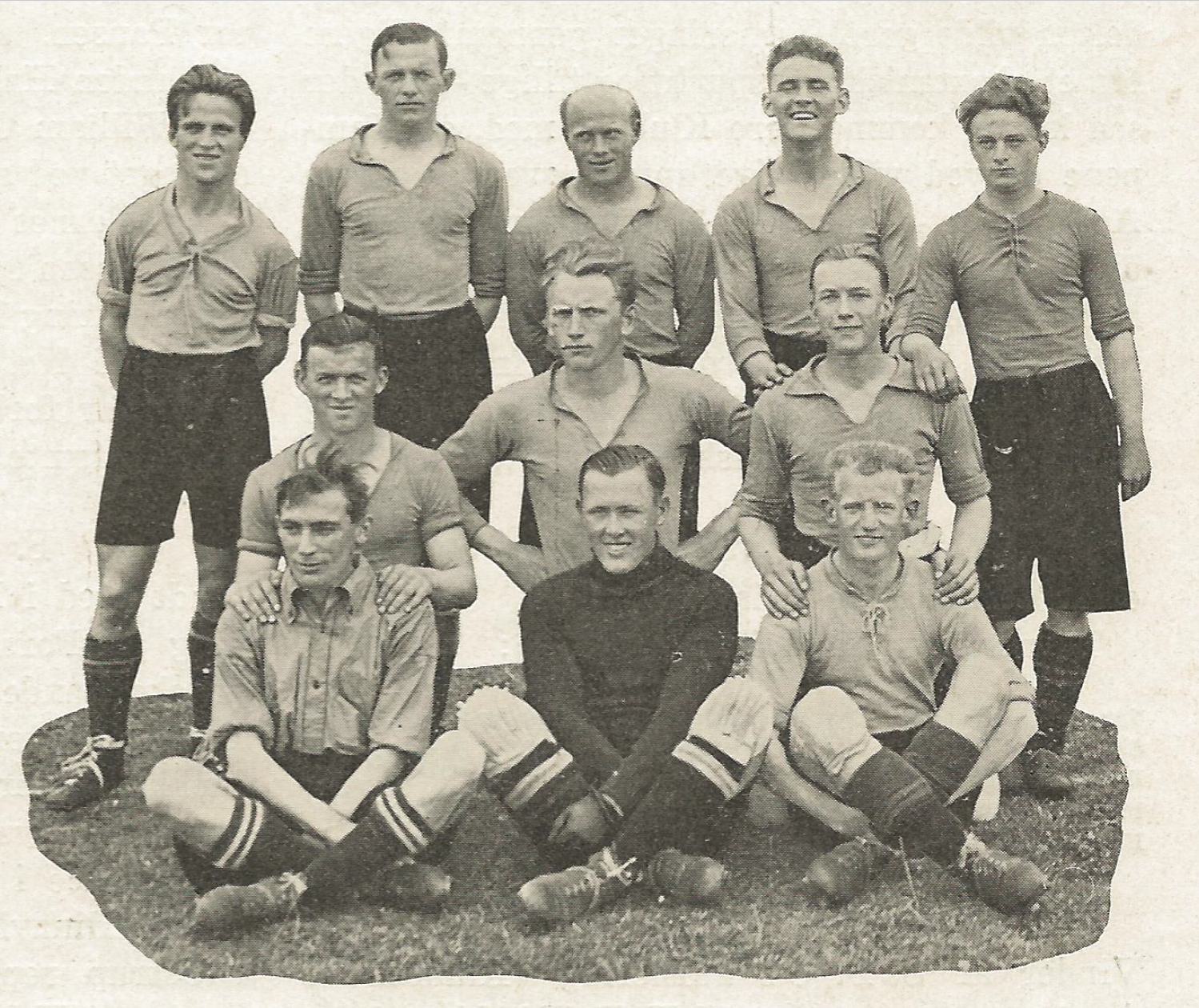
Winners of the Danish Provincial Football Championship 1927 — regular team line-up of Skovshoved IF. Standing: Ernst Hansen, Alex Guhle, Bernhard Møller, Ernst Sørensen, Sigurd Møller. Kneeling (middle): Johan Johansen, Helmuth Thomas, Willy Petersen. Sitting (front): Arthur Kuhlmann, Einar Jensen, Rasmus Christensen. Removed from the original un-edited photograf: Poul Hansen (reserve).

The final of the Provins-Turneringen was played between the representative club champions of Zealand FA and Funen FA in whipping rain. Skovshoved IF's team line-up was the same from their semi-final match against B 1901.

The provincial championship final at the municipal owned Skovshoved Idrætspark (also referred to as Banen ved Krøyersvej), Skovshoved was initiated by B 1909 as the attacking side and after 3 minutes of play, the away team's center forward Creutz Jensen scored the first goal. During the first half, the rain started pouring down and the playing field became wet, heavy and very greasy. While B 1909 have had the upper hand in the match so far, Skovserne were awarded a free kick after 25 minutes of play, and with a quick, direct and hard kick, the ball went in B 1909's goal net, scored by Helmuth Thomas. With two minutes remaining of the first half, Creutz Jensen scored the second goal for the Odense-team, after initial play by Carl Johansen and Aksel Petersen. Only shortly hereafter, the home team was able to get an attack, where the B 1909 goalkeeper Aage Larsen caused a foul against the attacking Skovshoved IF player, which the referee, Otto Remke (affiliated to Akademisk BK), awarded the north-Zealandian team a penalty kick due to obstructions from an Odense-defender, where Helmuth Thomas scored on with no chance for a save by the niner's goalkeeper. After the first half ended with the score of 2–2, the second half started with the Zealand Championship club scoring an easy goal after just 5 seconds. No further goals were scored in the match and the 3–2 lead ended up being the final score, securing Skovshoved IF their first Provincial Championship title. Skovshoved IF's centerhalf Helmuth Thomas was hailed as the best player on the pitch during the match.

Skovshoved IF won the Final of the Provinsmesterskabsturneringen and are crowned Provinsmestre (Champions of the province). The clubs earned the right to play in the national championship final.

==== Match details ====
19 June 1927
13:30 CEST

Skovshoved IF	3–2	B 1909
Helmuth Thomas 25', 44' (pen.); Bernard Møller 46'		Creutz Jensen 3', 43'

Skovshoved Idrætspark, Skovshoved
Attendance: 800
Referee: Otto Remke (Akademisk BK)

Skovshoved IF	B 1909

GK	Ejnar Jensen
DF	Arthur Kuhlmann
DF	Rasmus Christensen
MF	Johan Johansen
MF	Helmuth Thomas (captain)
MF	Willy Petersen
FW	Ernst Hansen
FW	Alex Guhle
FW	Bernard Møller
FW	Ernst Sørensen
FW	Sigurd Møller

GK	Aage Larsen
DF	Aage Hansen
	Emil Sundahl (captain)
MF	Hubert Møller
	Hans Pedersen
FW	Emil Petersen
FW	Carl Johan Johansen
FW	Creutz Jensen
MF	Carl Larsen
FW	Aksel Petersen
DF	Edmund Christensen

=== National Championship Final ===
==== Match summary ====
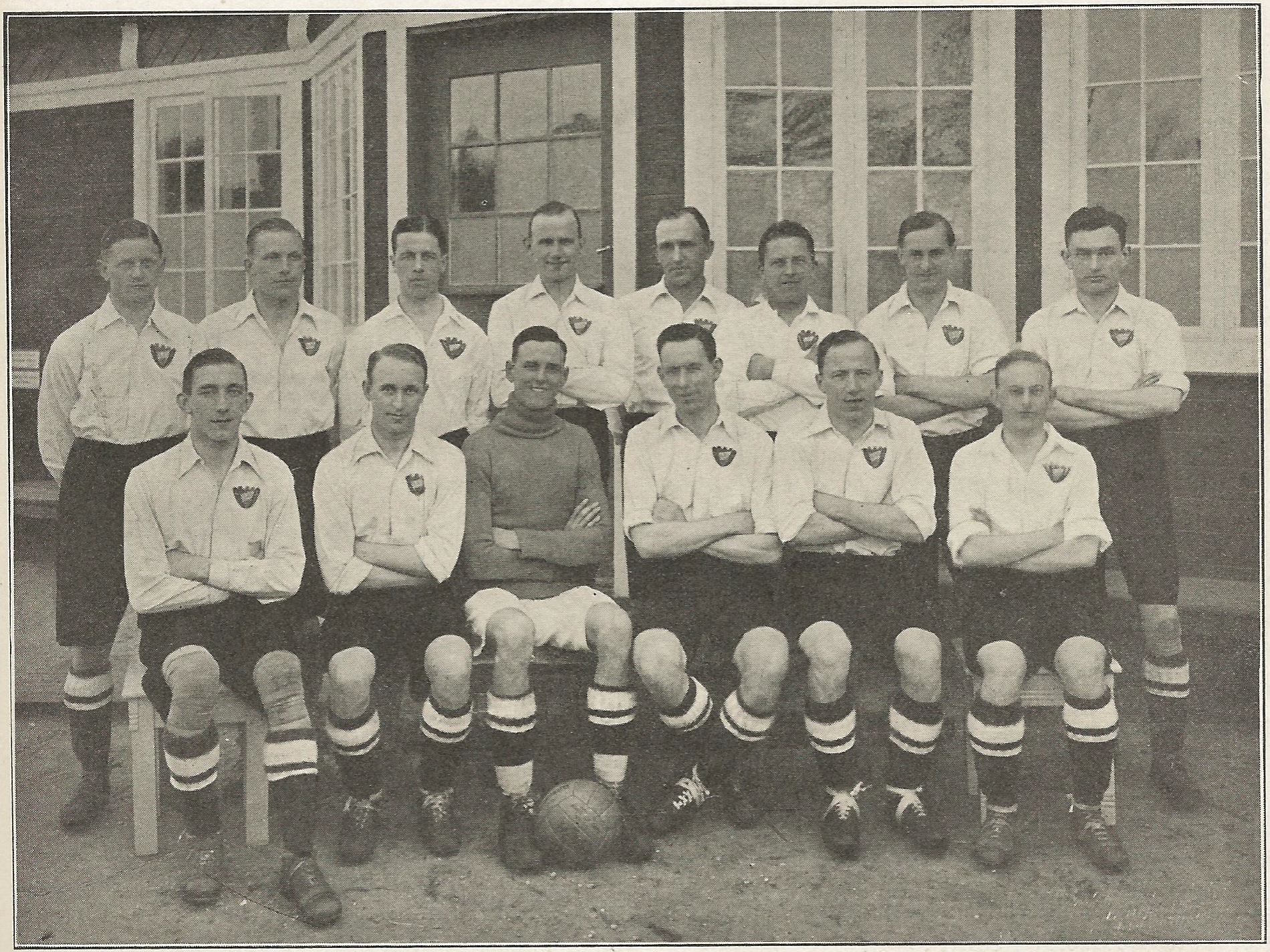
Winners of the Danish National Football Championship 1927 — regular team line-up of B.93 including reserves: Standing: Paul Offenbach, Svend Petersen, William Gram, Georg Hansen, Anthon Olsen, Michael Rohde, Magnus Simonsen, Helge Scharff. Sitting: Poul Zølck, Fritz Tarp, Svend Jensen, Charles Jensen, Poul Jensen, Leo Hansen. Missing footballer: Knud Andersen.

B.93 won the Final of the Landsfodboldturneringen and was crowned Danmarksmestre (Danish champions).

==== Match details ====
26 June 1927
13:30 CEST

B.93	5–1	Skovshoved IF
Poul Offenbach 43'; William Gram 47'; Poul Jensen 65' (pen.); Anthon Olsen 71'; Magnus Simonsen 88'		Alex Guhle 20'

Københavns Idrætspark, Copenhagen
Attendance: 3,500
Referee: Hugo Ohlsson (Helsingborg, Sweden)

B.93	Skovshoved IF

GK	Svend Jensen
DF	Knud Andersen
DF	Fritz Tarp (captain)
MF	Helge Scharff
MF	Poul Jensen
MF	Poul Zølck
FW	Georg Hansen
FW	Anthon Olsen
FW	Magnus Simonsen
FW	William Gram
FW	Poul Offenbach

GK	Ejnar Jensen
DF	Arthur Kuhlmann
DF	Rasmus Christensen
MF	Willy Petersen
MF	Helmuth Thomas (captain)
MF	Johan Johansen
FW	Sigurd Møller
FW	Ernst Sørensen
FW	Bernhard Møller
FW	Alex Guhle
FW	Ernst Hansen

== Statistics ==
=== Goalscorers ===
Rank	Player	Team	Goals
1	(Denmark) Axel Guhle	Skovshoved IF	5
