= 1927–28 SBUs Mesterskabsrække =

SBUs Mesterskabsrække
- Season: 1927–28
- Dates: 28 August 1927 – 20 May 1928 (regular season); 27 May – 3 June 1928 (replays)
- Champions: Skovshoved IF (4th title)
- Relegated: Holbæk BK; Slagelse BK&IF
- Matches: 56
- Goals: 277 (4.95 per match)
- Biggest home win: Frederiksborg IF 12–0 Slagelse BK&IF (28 August 1927); Skovshoved IF 12–0 Holbæk BK (2 October 1927)
- Biggest away win: Slagelse BK&IF 1–11 Skovshoved IF (9 October 1927)
- Highest scoring: Frederiksborg IF 12–0 Slagelse BK&IF (28 August 1927); Skovshoved IF 12–0 Holbæk BK (2 October 1927); Slagelse BK&IF 1–11 Skovshoved IF (9 October 1927)
- Total number of matches and goals played does not include the championship replay matches.

The 1927–28 SBUs Mesterskabsrække was the 32nd season of the Zealand Football Championship since its establishment in 1902 under the administration of Sjællands Boldspil-Union (SBU), and the 1st season since the league was renamed from SBUs A-Række to the SBUs Mesterskabsrække. The launch of the season began on 28 August 1927 and the final round of regular league fixtures were played on 20 May 1928 with the championship replays being held on 27 May and 3 June 1928 — including a 5 months long winter break between November and March. Skovshoved IF were the defending league champions from the 1926–27 season. The league ran simultaneously with the inaugural edition of the 1927–28 Danmarksmesterskabsturneringen i Fodbold, in which three the league's best placed teams from the previous season participated. The four highest ranking teams in the final standings would automatically qualify for the 1928–29 Danmarksmesterskabsturneringen i Fodbold. After the end of the season, the league winner would take part in the 1928 Provinsmesterskabsturneringen.

The winner of the league were Skovshoved IF, who secured their third consecutive SBU top-flight title, after winning both replay Championship matches, that were scheduled, due to the club being tied on points with Frederiksborg IF after the regular season. Holbæk BK and Slagelse BK&IF finished at the bottom of the table, and they would therefore be relegated to the Zealand FA's second-tier football league, SBUs A-Række, while two other teams would be promoted for the upcoming season of Mesterrækken.

== Season summary ==
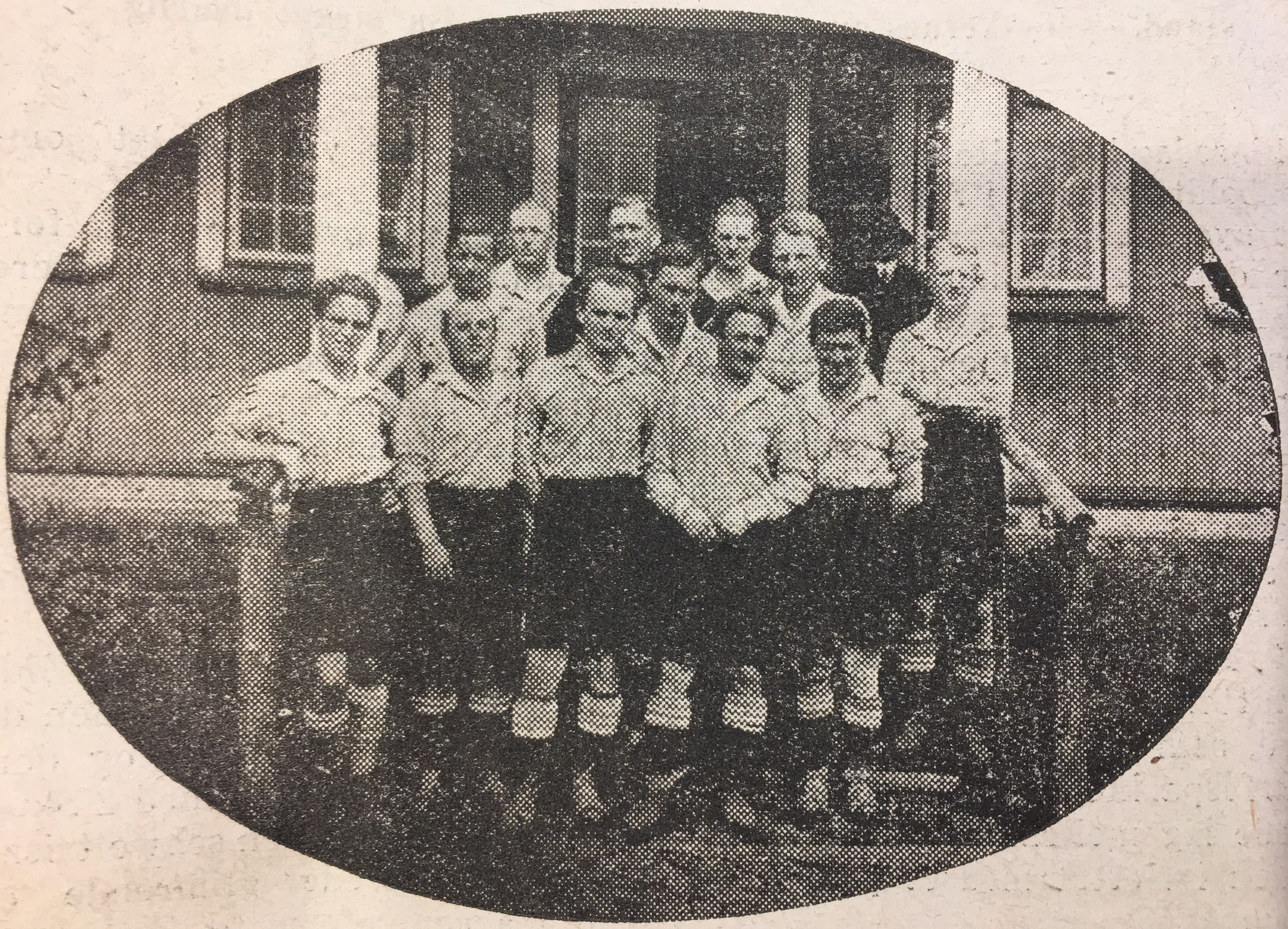
Regular league team line-up including reserves of Skovshoved IF in 1928, the winners of the 1927/28-season of SBUs Mesterskabsrække. First row: Ernst Hansen, Hans Møller, Henning Thomas, Sigurd Møller and Johan Johansen. Second row: Aksel Guhle, Svend Strømann, Helmuth Thomas and Rasmus Christiansen. Third row: Villy Petersen, Ejner Jensen and Haugaard (reserve player).

=== Regular season ===
The match schedule for the league's fall season was published on 26 August 1927 by the tournament official of the Zealand FA, Ludwig (a fitter from Korsør). Frederiksborg IF, located in Hillerød and trained by Harald Henriksen, won all seven league matches in the fall of 1927 and halfway through the season, they were placed at the top of the league with 14 points and a score of 35 goals for and 4 goals against. In the following spots, Korsør BK had 10 points, Skovshoved IF had 8 points, Frederikssund IK had 7 points, Haslev IF had 6 points, Holbæk BK and Næstved BK had 4 points, while Slagelse BK&IF had obtained 3 points. While Skovshoved IF won their first four league matches against Frederikssund IK (2–0), Haslev IF (5–1), Holbæk BK (12–0) and Slagelse BK&IF (11–1), they lost their last three matches of the fall season in a row against Næstved BK (1–4), Korsør BK (1–2) and Frederiksborg IF (1–2). After the fall season's last league match between Skovshoved IF and Frederiksborg IF on 30 October 1927 — played at the same time as the national match at Københavns Idrætspark between Denmark and Norway — the defending league and provincial champions, Skovshoved IF, were given few chances to catch up to the 6 points lead created by Frederiksborg IF in the upcoming spring season.

At the club's general assembly on 27 April 1928, the chairman of Slagelse BK&IF, Thorvald Nielsen, argued that the bad results of the senior team during the fall season was caused by a large part of the active players departing the club in the summer period of 1927 either through membership cancellation or travelling away from the town and the remaining players not having sufficient training. The string of bad results continued in the spring, where the team did not manage to win any league matches and ending in the last spot, eventually resulting in the relegation of the club to the SBU's A-Række in the upcoming season.

The fixtures for the last half of the 1927/28-season were published in late February, a month before the continuation of the league's spring season. The Hillerød-based club's seven matches long winning streak was abolished in the first spring match on their own home ground against Næstved BK, who won their third of the season and at the same time score all goals in the match (one own goal). While Frederiksborg IF had an unsteady spring season of 1928, losing several matches, Skovshoved IF on the other hand won all of home and away matches and caught with Frederiksborg IF in the regular season's penultimate fight, where the teams played each other. On 13 May 1928, the stage was set at the Idrætspladsen (at the end of the Sportsvej, the road now known as Tennisvej) in Hillerød in front of more than 600 spectators with Skovshoved IF playing in blue shirts and the Frederiksborg IF players appearing in red and white. Frederiksborg IF needed a win the match to secure the league title, while Skovshoved IF were forced to win the match to force an additional replay match for the title. After only five minutes of play, the Skovshoved IF forward Axel Gühle scored the first goal, which eventually turned out to be the last goal of the match, when the referee, Axel Holm from Lyngby, blew the whistle to end the game. Frederiksborg IF's player Max Larsen was injured during the match and on the doctor's orders, he did not participate for the remaining part of the season. When both teams also secured a win in their league matches, a championship replay match was organised a week later on a neutral ground between the rivals for the title. An agreement to play the match at either Hillerød or Skovshoved could not be reached.

=== Championship play-offs ===
Frederiksborg IF fielded a line-up consisting of a replica of players from their away match against Holbæk Boldklub on 20 May 1928. Skovshoved IF was declared winner of the 1927–28 edition of the tournament by winning both replay matches, and also won the right to keep the present trophy permanently after winning the league for the third consecutive season. A long and an emotional debate regarding the championship replays and the surrounding events took place at the annual general meeting for the Zealand Football Association on 10 June 1928.

== League table ==
A total of eight teams were contesting the league, all 8 sides from the 1926–27 season. Every team played two games against each other team, one at home and one away — seven matches per team in the fall and the remaining 7 matches in the spring. Teams received two points for a win and one point for a draw. If two or more teams were tied on points, places were determined by goal average unless this concerned the Zealand Championship, qualification for the national championship tournament or relegation to Zealand FA's the second-tier league, in which case replay matches would be scheduled. The team with the most points were crowned champions, while the two teams with the fewest points would be relegated to SBUs A-række and replaced with the two highest ranking teams from the 1927–28 SBUs A-Række. At the start of the season, only three teams would qualify for the next season of the Danish national league championship, but this was later expanded to include a fourth team.

Pos	Team	Pld	W	D	L	GF	GA	GR	Pts	Promotion, qualification or relegation
1	Skovshoved IF (C)	14	11	0	3	57	13	4.385	22 (Note: Skovshoved IF and Frederiksborg IF both finished level on points at the top of the final table. Two replay matches to determine the Zealand Championship were played and the title was eventually awarded to Skovshoved IF.)	Qualification for the 1928 Provinsmesterskabsturneringen, preliminary round & 1928–29 Danmarksmesterskabsturneringen
2	Frederiksborg IF	14	11	0	3	49	15	3.267	22	Qualification for the 1928–29 Danmarksmesterskabsturneringen
3	Korsør BK	14	9	1	4	37	20	1.850	19	Qualification for the 1928–29 Danmarksmesterskabsturneringen
4	Haslev IF	14	7	3	4	31	22	1.409	17	Qualification for the 1928–29 Danmarksmesterskabsturneringen
5	Frederikssund IK	14	6	1	7	40	33	1.212	13	
6	Næstved BK	14	5	0	9	27	44	0.614	10	
7	Holbæk BK (R)	14	2	2	10	18	52	0.346	6	Relegation to 1928–29 SBUs A-række
8	Slagelse BK&IF (R)	14	1	1	12	18	78	0.231	3	Relegation to 1928–29 SBUs A-række

Rules for classification: 1) Points
(C) Champions; (R) Relegated

== Results ==
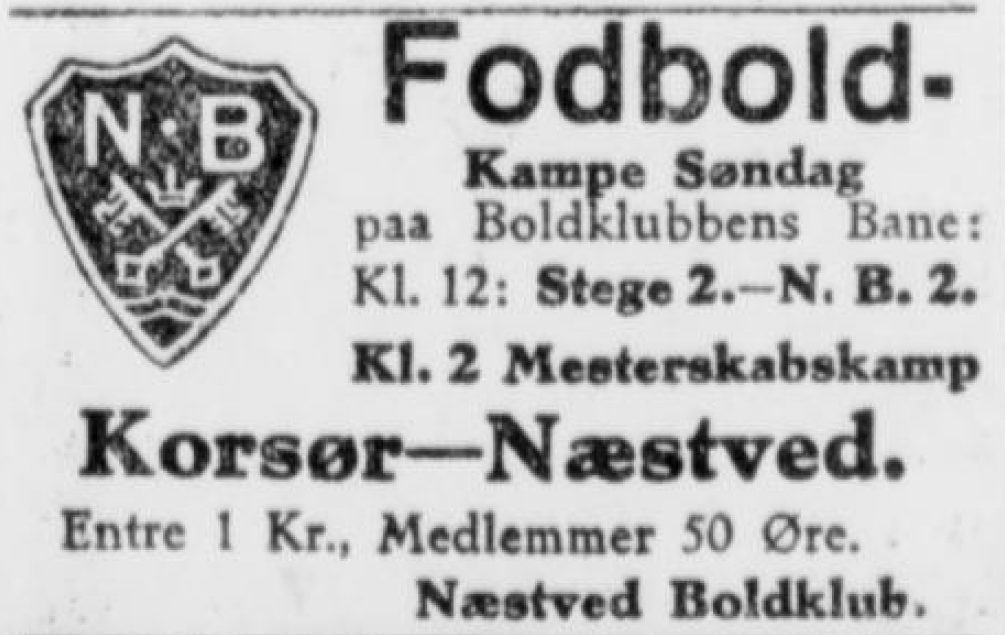
Newspaper advertisement for the league match between Næstved BK and Korsør BK on 13 May 1928.

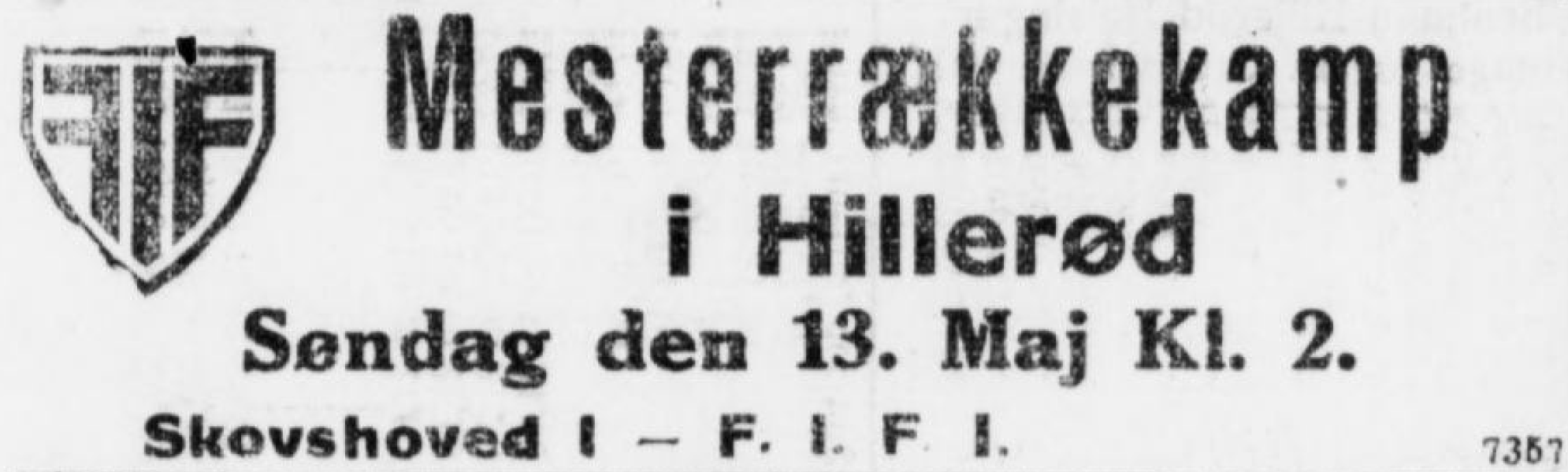
Newspaper advertisement for the regular season's penultimate league match between Frederiksborg IF and Skovshoved IF on 13 May 1928.

Home \ Away	SIF	FIF	KBK	HIF	FIK	NBK	HBK	SBI
Skovshoved IF	—	1–2	4–0	5–1	2–0	4–0	12–0	8–0
Frederiksborg IF	0–1	—	3–0	0–2	6–2	1–3	7–0	12–0
Korsør BK	2–1	0–2	—	1–1	3–1	5–1	5–0	5–0
Haslev IF	0–1	0–1	1–4	—	3–3	4–0	3–2	3–1
Frederikssund IK	2–4	0–3	1–2	1–2	—	3–0	4–2	11–0
Næstved BK	4–1	1–5	1–5	0–5	2–4	—	4–0	3–1
Holbæk BK	1–2	4–5	0–3	1–1	2–3	2–1	—	0–0
Slagelse BK&IF	1–11	1–2	4–2	2–5	2–5	4–7	2–4	—

Legend: Blue = home team win; Yellow = draw; Red = away team win.
For upcoming matches, an "a" indicates there is an article about the rivalry between the two participants.

== Season statistics ==
=== Hat-tricks ===
Player	For	Against	Result	Date	Ref
(Denmark) Oluf Jensen	Frederiksborg IF	Slagelse BK&IF	12–0 (H)	28 August 1927	
(Denmark) Erik "Basse" Larsen	Frederiksborg IF	Slagelse BK&IF	12–0 (H)	28 August 1927	
(Denmark) Gustav Thorbjørn	Frederiksborg IF	Slagelse BK&IF	12–0 (H)	28 August 1927	
(Denmark) Erik "Basse" Larsen^{4}	Frederiksborg IF	Holbæk BK	7–0 (H)	18 September 1927	
(Denmark) R. Bro	Frederikssund IK	Næstved BK	4–2 (A)	18 September 1927	
(Denmark) Johs. Nielsen^{4}	Frederikssund IK	Slagelse BK&IF	11–0 (H)	25 September 1927	
(Denmark) Erik "Basse" Larsen^{4}	Frederiksborg IF	Næstved BK	5–1 (A)	9 October 1927	
(Denmark) Sigurd Møller	Skovshoved IF	Frederikssund IK	4–2 (A)	20 May 1928	

- ^{4} Player scored 4 goals

== Zealand Championship replays ==
Skovshoved IF and Frederiksborg IF both finished level on points (22 pts) at the top of the final league standings. A replay match was scheduled at a neutral playing field, Helsingør Stadium in Helsingør, to determine the Zealand League Championship, which Skovshoved IF won with the score 2–1. Due to a protest from Frederiksborg IF (due to the first match being delayed 21 minutes), a second replay match was played the following Sunday, before an actual decision regarding the protest had been made by the Zealand FA. The second match was also won by Skovshoved IF, who were hence declared the winner of the Zealandian league for 1927/28-season. Both Frederiksborg IF and Skovshoved IF fielded the same line-up for both matches.

27 May 1928
13:30 CEST
1st Replay

Frederiksborg IF	1–2	Skovshoved IF
Georg Nordraak 32'		Svend Strømann 75'; Helmut Thomas 87'

Helsingør Stadium, Helsingør
Attendance: 2,000
Referee: Sophus Hansen (BK Frem)

Frederiksborg IF	Skovshoved IF

GK	Oluf Hansen
DF	Carl Andreasen
DF	Hans Andersen
MF	Aage Jensen
MF	Chr. Andersen (Captain)
MF	Harry Jensen
FW	Poul Jørgensen
FW	Georg Nordraak
FW	Oluf Jensen
FW	Erik "Basse" Larsen
FW	Gustav Thorbjørn

GK	Einar Jensen
DF	Rasmus Christensen
DF	Willy Petersen
MF	Hans Møller
MF	Helmuth Thomas (Captain)
MF	Johan Johansen
FW	Ernst Hansen
FW	Axel Guhle
FW	Svend Strømann
FW	Henning Thomas
FW	Sigurd Møller

Match rules

- 90 minutes.
- Replay match if scores level after full-time.

3 June 1928
16:00 CEST
2nd Replay

Skovshoved IF	2–0	Frederiksborg IF
Henning Thomas 17'; Axel Guhle 75'

Hellerup Sportspark, Hellerup
Attendance: 2,000
Referee: P. Lindholdt (Copenhagen)

Skovshoved IF	Frederiksborg IF

GK	Einar Jensen
DF	Rasmus Christensen
DF	Willy Petersen
MF	Hans Møller
MF	Helmuth Thomas (Captain)
MF	Johan Johansen
FW	Ernst Hansen
FW	Axel Guhle
FW	Svend Strømann
FW	Henning Thomas
FW	Sigurd Møller

GK	Oluf Hansen
DF	Carl Andreasen
DF	Hans Andersen
MF	Aage Jensen
MF	Chr. Andersen (Captain)
MF	Harry Jensen
FW	Poul Jørgensen
FW	Georg Nordraak
FW	Oluf Jensen
FW	Erik "Basse" Larsen
FW	Gustav Thorbjørn

Match rules

- 90 minutes.
- Replay match if scores level after full-time.
