= Provinsmesterskabsturneringen =

Provinsmesterskabsturneringen i Fodbold
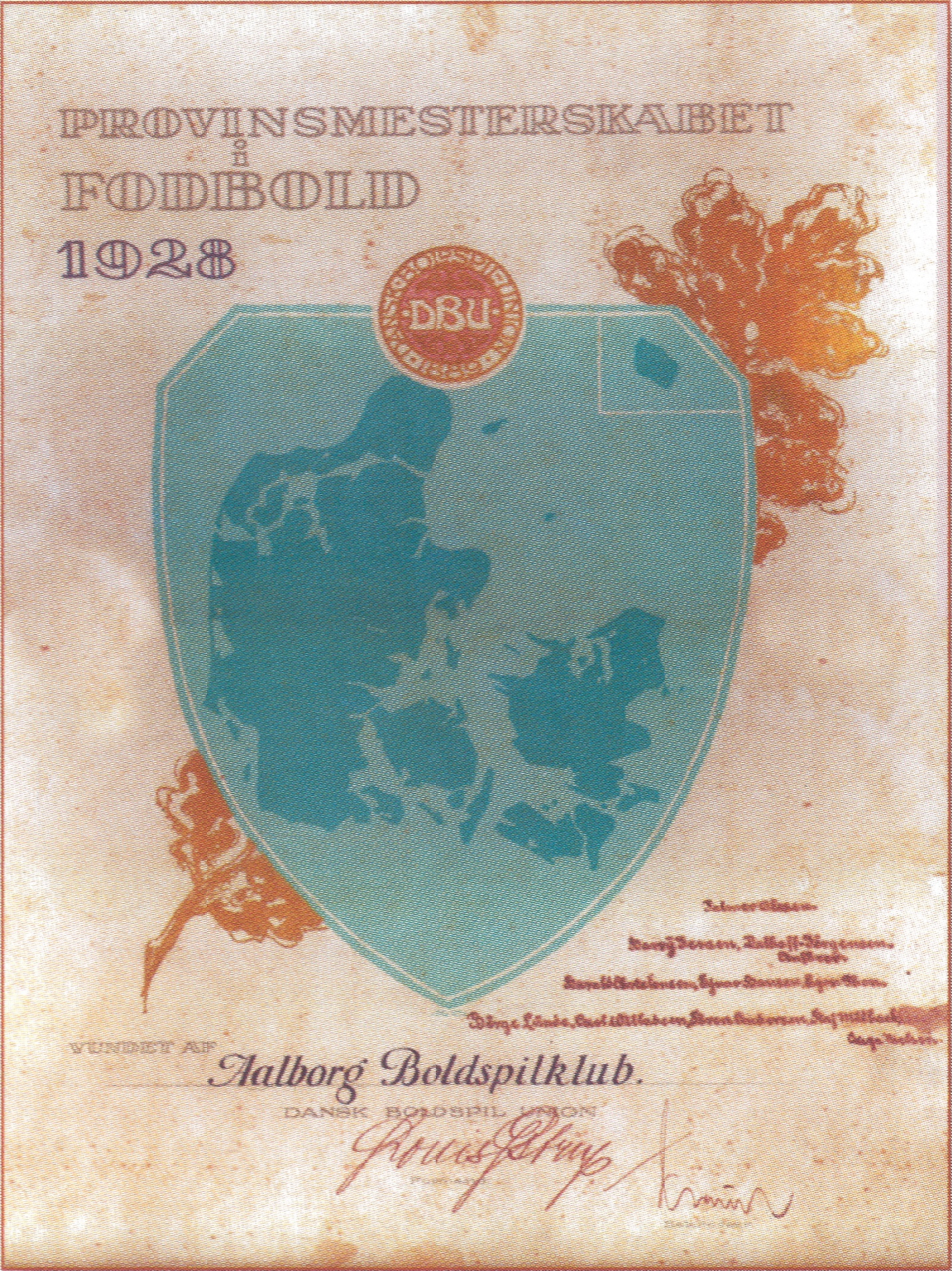
- The official diploma granted by the Danish FA (DBU) to Aalborg BK (JBU) for the club's win in the 1928 edition of the tournament.
- Organiser(s): Danish FA (DBU)
- Founded: 1913; 113 years ago
- Abolished: 1931; 95 years ago
- Region: Bornholm, Funen, Jutland, Lolland-Falster and Zealand
- Teams: 5 (1913–1914; 1921–1930); 4 (1916–1920; 1931)
- Qualifier for: Danish Football Championship semifinal or final (1913–1927)
- Last champions: B 1909 (1931)
- Most championships: B 1901 (7 titles)

Provinsmesterskabsturneringen i Fodbold (transl. Danish Provincial Football Tournament) was a knockout association football competition contested annually between 1913 and 1931, organised by the Danish FA (DBU), which determined the championship of the provinces (regions outside the main capital city, Copenhagen).

No trophy was awarded to the winner of the tournament, who instead received a diploma and could refer themselves as Vinder af Provinsmesterskabet i Fodbold or simply Provinsmester (English: Champions of the Provincial Football Championship). The most successful club in the history of the tournament's 18 editions was B 1901, who participated in all national tournaments by winning the regional Lolland-Falster league championship, winning a total of 7 provincial titles and appearing as a losing finalist on 4 occasions. As a result of the club's success, the Lolland-Falster FA became the most successful regional association, only fielding B 1901 as its representative during the tournament's entire duration.

== History ==
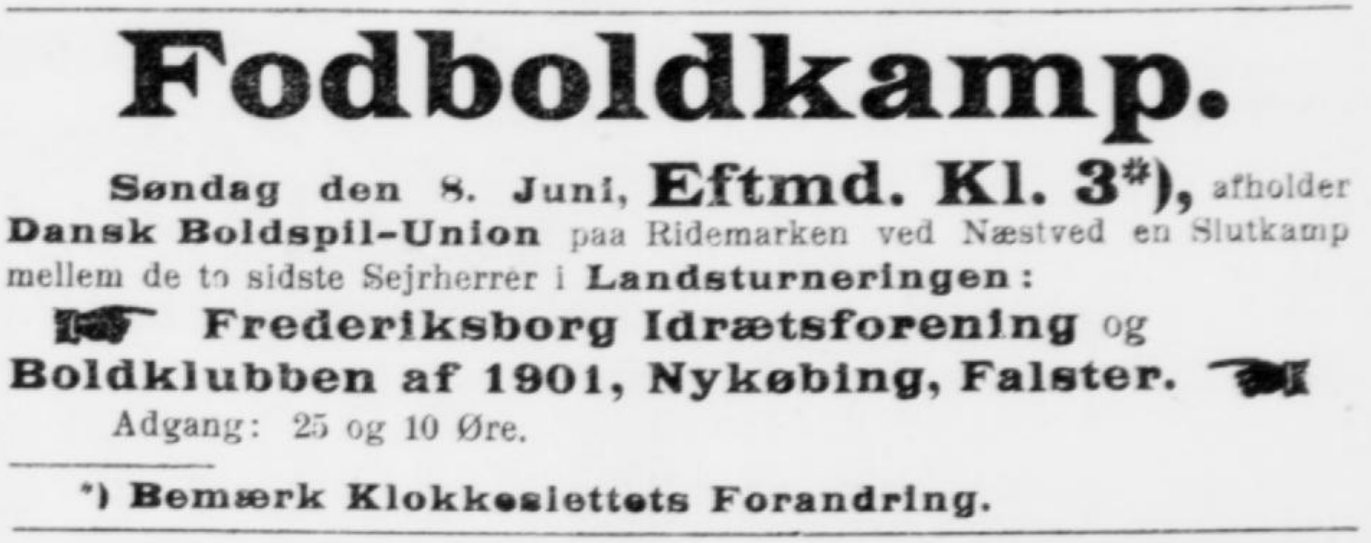
Newspaper advertisement for the final match on 8 June 1913 between Frederiksborg IF Hillerød and B 1901.

Until 1927, the cup tournament was part of the Danish Championship play-off, Landspokalturneringen, and was held prior to the Danish National Championship semifinal (1914 and 1916) or final. Beginning from the 1928-season, the regional championship became a separate tournament held alongside the Danish Championship (part of Danmarksmesterskabsturneringen i Fodbold), but still organised by the Danish FA, now under the official name of Provinsmesterskabsturneringen.

In principle, the final of the tournament was scheduled to be played on a neutral ground, which occurred on 9 occasions, while the rest of the finals ended up being played at the home field of one of the teams in the final. Almost two-thirds of the finals (1916–18, 1920–22, 1924–26 and 1929–31) were played on a football field located in Odense.

Throughout the competition's existence, the five regional football championship clubs from Bornholm FA (BBU), Funen FA (FBU), Jutland FA (JBU), Lolland-Falster FA (LFBU) and Zealand FA (SBU) participated after the end of normal league season, except for the years 1916–1920 (Bornholm FA) and 1931 (Jutland FA). The 1915 edition was not played due to the limitations imposed as a consequence of World War I. The tournament was abolished after the 1931 edition, where the Jutland FA representative, Esbjerg fB, withdrew from the competition due to lack of time in its schedule.

== Finals ==
Key	Explanation
(number of cup wins)	A running tally of the total number of titles won by each club is kept in brackets.
(a.e.t.)	After extra time (two periods of 15 minutes each).
(ab.)	Match abandoned before full time. Match score and result withstood.

Season	Final Date	Winner	Result	Runner-up	Venue	Attendance	Ref
1913	8 June 1913	B 1901 (1)	6–2 (ab.)	Frederiksborg IF Hillerød	Ridemarken, Næstved	500	
1914	31 May 1914	Vejle BK (1)	2–1	Rønne BK	Københavns Idrætspark, Copenhagen	1,000	
1915	Cancelled						
1916	4 June 1916	Odense BK (1)	2–0	B 1901	Munke Mose, Odense	1,000	
1917	3 June 1917	B 1901 (2)	3–2	Odense BK	Munke Mose, Odense	1,800	
1918	2 June 1918	Randers SK Freja (1)	2–0	Frederiksborg IF Hillerød	OB's Bane, Odense	—N/a	
1919	25 May 1919	B 1901 (3)	4–1	Odense BK	B 1901's Bane, Nykøbing Falster	—N/a	
1920	30 May 1920	B 1901 (4)	2–1	Ringkøbing IF	Odense	500	
1921	21 May 1921	Aarhus GF (1)	3–1 (a.e.t.)	B 1901	Odense	—N/a	
1922	12 June 1922	B 1901 (5)	2–1	Aarhus GF	Odense	—N/a	
1923	27 May 1923	Aarhus GF (2)	3–0 (a.e.t.)	Frederiksborg IF Hillerød	Aarhus Stadium, Aarhus	—N/a	
1924	1 June 1924	B 1913 (1)	3–1	B 1901	Odense	—N/a	
1925	7 June 1925	Aarhus GF (3)	4–1	B 1901	Odense	—N/a	
1926	6 June 1926	B 1901 (6)	7–3	Horsens FS	Odense	—N/a	
1927	19 June 1927	Skovshoved IF (1)	3–2	B 1909	Skovshoved Idrætspark, Skovshoved	500	
1928	24 June 1928	Aalborg BK (1)	8–2	Skovshoved IF	Aalborg Stadium, Aalborg	1,800	
1929	16 June 1929	B 1901 (7)	8–6	Aalborg BK	B 1909's Bane, Odense	2,000	
1930	13 July 1930	B 1913 (2)	3–1	Frederiksborg IF Hillerød	B 1913's Bane, Odense	1,400	
1931	21 June 1931	B 1909 (1)	3–2	Helsingør IF	Odense Idrætspark, Odense	1,000	

== Performances ==
=== Results by team ===
Teams shown in italics are no longer in existence. B 1901 won the most championship titles and shares the record of losing the largest number of final matches with Frederiksborg IF Hillerød.

Club	Association	Wins	First final won	Last final won	Runners-up	Last final lost	Total final appearances
B 1901	Lolland-Falster FA	7	1913	1929	4	1925	11
Aarhus GF	Jutland FA	3	1921	1925	1	1922	4
B 1913	Funen FA	2	1924	1930	0	—	2
Odense BK	Funen FA	1	1916	1916	2	1919	3
B 1909	Funen FA	1	1931	1931	1	1927	2
Aalborg BK	Jutland FA	1	1928	1928	1	1929	2
Skovshoved IF	Zealand FA	1	1927	1927	1	1928	2
Vejle BK	Jutland FA	1	1914	1914	0	—	1
Randers SK Freja	Jutland FA	1	1918	1918	0	—	1
Frederiksborg IF Hillerød	Zealand FA	0	—	—	4	1930	4
Helsingør IF	Zealand FA	0	—	—	1	1931	1
Horsens FS	Jutland FA	0	—	—	1	1926	1
Ringkøbing IF	Jutland FA	0	—	—	1	1920	1
Rønne BK	Bornholm FA	0	—	—	1	1914	1

=== Results by association ===
The single team, B 1901, that represented the Lolland-Falster FA throughout the tournament's entire history, single-handedly ensured that the regional association ended up with the most championship titles combined.

Association	Clubs	Seasons	Wins	First final won	Last final won	Runners-up	Last final lost	Total final appearances
Lolland-Falster FA (LFBU)	1	18	7	1913	1929	4	1925	11
Jutland FA (JBU)	8	17	6	1914	1928	4	1929	10
Funen FA (FBU)	4	18	4	1916	1931	3	1927	7
Zealand FA (SBU)	6	18	1	1927	1927	6	1931	7
Bornholm FA (BBU)	2	13	0	—	—	1	1914	1
