= Series 1 (Danish football) =

Sixth level of Danish football

Serie 1
- Country: Denmark
- Confederation: DBU
- Divisions: 1 (DBU Bornholm); 2 (DBU Copenhagen); 2 (DBU Funen); 6 (DBU Jutland); 1 (DBU Lolland-Falster); 2 (DBU Zealand)
- Number of clubs: 6 (DBU Bornholm); 26 (DBU Copenhagen); 28 (DBU Funen); 48 (DBU Jutland); 12 (DBU Lolland-Falster); 28 (DBU Zealand)
- Level on pyramid: 7
- Promotion to: Copenhagen Series; Funen Series; Jutland Series; Zealand Series
- Relegation to: Series 2
- Domestic cup: Danish Cup (1954–present)

Series 1 (Danish: Serie 1) is the seventh level in the league system of Danish football. The division is organized by the regional branches of the Danish Football Association (DBU).

The division has changed its name on numerous occasions. It has previously been known as B-rækken (up until 1921–22) and Mellemrækken (1947–1984), before settling with the current name of Serie 1 in 1985.

== The competition ==
The season starts in the spring and ends in the fall, and there is promotion and relegation after each half season. Each club in the groups play the others twice, once at their home stadium and once at that of their opponents. The top team in each Series 1 group is promoted to sixth-tier regional leagues: Copenhagen Series, Funen Series, Jutland Series or Zealand Series. The bottom two teams in each Series 1 group are relegated to Series 2.

== Administration ==
The regional branches of the Danish Football Association (DBU), DBU Copenhagen, DBU Funen, DBU Jutland and DBU Zealand, as well as the local branches under DBU Copenhagen and DBU Zealand, DBU Bornholm and DBU Lolland-Falster, respectively, are responsible for the administration of Series 1. The Bornholm and Lolland-Falster Series 1 tiers are named Bornholmsserien and LF-Serien. The Danish Football Association is responsible for the administration of the fourth tier Denmark Series and the higher tiers of the Danish football league system.
