= Vejlby-Risskov Idrætsklub =

Association football club in Aarhus

VRI
- Full name: Vejlby-Risskov Idrætsklub
- Founded: 9 November 1937; 88 years ago
- Ground: NES Park, Risskov
- Chairman: Jesper Ørskov Nielsen
- Head coach: Andreas Skriver Nielsen
- League: Denmark Series
- 2021–22: Denmark Series Group 4, 8th of 10
- Website: https://vri.dk/fodbold
| Home colours | Away colours |

Vejlby-Risskov Idrætsklub, commonly known as VRI, is a sports club based in Risskov, Aarhus, Denmark. VRI is mostly known for its association football department, which competes in the Denmark Series, the fifth tier of the Danish football league system. Founded in 1937, it is affiliated to the regional DBU Jutland football association. The team plays its home matches at NES Park where it has been based since 2011.

== History ==
The club was founded on 9 November 1937. The initiators were Frode Nielsen and Gunnar Åse Nielsen, who established the club at a meeting held at Risskov Badehotel, where 70 new members joined the club.

Frode Nielsen, who became chairman, Gunnar Nielsen, Erling Nielsen, S. Blinkenberg and Søren Andersen were elected to the first board. Initially, the club mostly focused on handball, but the club included football in its program from 1938.

The first training grounds were located at the current Bellevuehal, while indoor training took place in Stadionhallen. In 1952, the club was allocated a clubhouse adjacent to Bellevue Beach. Bellevuehallen, the club's new indoor arena, was inaugurated on 19 June 1966, with the addition of another new indoor arena in 1987. Each year in December, VRI hosts an indoor football tournament in Bellevuehallerne to find the "Aarhus Champions in Indoor Football" between selected teams from AGF, Aarhus Fremad, VSK Aarhus and VRI.

On 20 November 2011, the club inaugurated its new home ground, NES Park, with a pitch consisting of artificial turf. Present at the inauguration were local Aarhus players Martin Jørgensen and Peter Graulund, as well as former VRI player Mikkel Kirkeskov.

The football department has mostly spent its existence in the lower tiers of the Danish football league system, bouncing between the fifth tier Jutland Series and lower regional tiers. Its best historical achievement was long regarded to be the 1969 promotion to the fourth-tier Denmark Series, with the club almost reaching the third tier 3rd Division in 1971. In 2019, VRI repeated the feat from 1969 and won promotion to the Denmark Series after a 3–0 win over Agerbæk/Starup in the third to last round.
