= 1927–28 JBUs Mesterskabsrække =

JBUs Mesterskabsrække
- Season: 1927–28
- Dates: August 1927 – May 1928 (regular season); 13 May – 24 June 1928 (play-offs)
- Champions: Aalborg BK (4th title)
- Relegated: Holstebro BK; BK Herning Fremad
- Matches: 60
- Goals: 299 (4.98 per match)
- Total number of matches and goals played does not include the promotion/relegation play-offs.

The 1927–28 JBUs Mesterskabsrække was the 30th season of the Jutland Football Championship since its establishment in 1902. The season was launched in August 1927 and concluded in May 1928 with the final match of the regular league fixtures, while the championship play-offs and promotion/relegation play-off matches were held in May and June 1928. Aalborg BK won both final matches, securing their 4th Jutland league championship and qualifying for the 1928 Provinsmesterskabsturneringen, which they also won. Holstebro BK and BK Herning Fremad were relegated and replaced by Brønderslev IF and Haderslev FK from the 1927–28 JBUs A-række. In the 1927 JBUs Pokalturnering, Aalborg BK obtained their fourth consecutive cup championship, by winning the final against Esbjerg fB.

== Teams ==
=== Stadia and locations ===
| Club | Location | Stadium |
|---|---|---|
| BK Herning Fremad | Herning | |
| Esbjerg fB | Esbjerg | |
| Fredericia BK | Fredericia | |
| Holstebro BK | Holstebro | |
| Horsens FS | Horsens | |
| IK Aalborg Chang | Aalborg | |
| IK Aalborg Freja | Aalborg | |
| Kolding BK | Kolding | |
| Vejle BK | Vejle | |
| Viborg FF | Viborg | |
| Aalborg BK | Aalborg | |
| Aarhus GF | Aarhus | |

== League table ==
=== Nordkredsen ===
| Pos | Team | Pld | W | D | L | GF | GA | GR | Pts | Promotion, qualification or relegation |
|---|---|---|---|---|---|---|---|---|---|---|
| 1 | Aalborg BK (C) | 10 | 6 | 3 | 1 | 29 | 26 | 1.115 | 15 | Qualification for the Championship play-offs & 1928–29 Danmarksmesterskabsturneringen |
| 2 | Aarhus GF | 10 | 6 | 2 | 2 | 36 | 16 | 2.250 | 14 | Qualification for the 1928–29 Danmarksmesterskabsturneringen |
| 3 | IK Aalborg Freja | 10 | 5 | 2 | 3 | 30 | 23 | 1.304 | 12 | Qualification for the 1928–29 Danmarksmesterskabsturneringen |
| 4 | Viborg FF | 10 | 3 | 2 | 5 | 20 | 30 | 0.667 | 8 | |
| 5 | IK Aalborg Chang | 10 | 2 | 3 | 5 | 24 | 24 | 1.000 | 7 | |
| 6 | Holstebro BK (R) | 10 | 1 | 2 | 7 | 19 | 39 | 0.487 | 4 | Qualification to the Promotion/relegation play-offs |

Rules for classification: 1) Points
(C) Champions; (R) Relegated

=== Sydkredsen ===
| Pos | Team | Pld | W | D | L | GF | GA | GR | Pts | Promotion, qualification or relegation |
|---|---|---|---|---|---|---|---|---|---|---|
| 1 | Esbjerg fB | 10 | 6 | 2 | 2 | 35 | 18 | 1.944 | 14 | Qualification for the Championship play-offs & 1928–29 Danmarksmesterskabsturneringen |
| 2 | Horsens FS | 10 | 6 | 1 | 3 | 28 | 16 | 1.750 | 13 | Qualification for the 1928–29 Danmarksmesterskabsturneringen |
| 3 | Fredericia BK | 10 | 6 | 1 | 3 | 22 | 18 | 1.222 | 13 | Qualification for the 1928–29 Danmarksmesterskabsturneringen |
| 4 | Kolding BK | 10 | 4 | 2 | 4 | 23 | 21 | 1.095 | 10 | |
| 5 | Vejle BK | 10 | 2 | 2 | 6 | 17 | 33 | 0.515 | 6 | |
| 6 | BK Herning Fremad (R) | 10 | 1 | 2 | 7 | 16 | 37 | 0.432 | 4 | Qualification to the Promotion/relegation play-offs |

Rules for classification: 1) Points
(R) Relegated

== Results ==
| Home \ Away | AAB | AGF | AAF | VFF | AAC | HBK |
|---|---|---|---|---|---|---|
| Aalborg BK | — | | | | 4–3 | |
| Aarhus GF | 7–0 | — | | | | |
| IK Aalborg Freja | | | — | | | 4–3 |
| Viborg FF | | | | — | | 4–1 |
| IK Aalborg Chang | | | | | — | |
| Holstebro BK | | | | | | — |

Legend: Blue = home team win; Yellow = draw; Red = away team win.
For upcoming matches, an "a" indicates there is an article about the rivalry between the two participants.

| Home \ Away | EFB | HFS | FBK | KBK | VBK | BHF |
|---|---|---|---|---|---|---|
| Esbjerg fB | — | | | 4–2 | | |
| Horsens FS | | — | | | 4–1 | 8–1 |
| Fredericia BK | | | — | | 3–0 | |
| Kolding BK | | | | — | | |
| Vejle BK | 4–2 | | | | — | |
| BK Herning Fremad | | | | | | — |

Legend: Blue = home team win; Yellow = draw; Red = away team win.
For upcoming matches, an "a" indicates there is an article about the rivalry between the two participants.

== Championship play-offs ==
The finals were contested on neutral venues between the winners of the North and South groups, Aalborg BK and Esbjerg fB. The winner qualified for the semi-finals of the 1928 Provinsmesterskabsturneringen.

13 May 1928
1st play-off

| Aalborg BK | 3 – 0 | Esbjerg fB |
|---|---|---|
| Søren Andersen 44', 89'; Alex Villadsen 87' |

Vejle Stadium, Vejle
Attendance: 1,500
Referee: Sophus Petersen (Horsens)

| Aalborg BK | Esbjerg fB |

| GK | Folmer Olesen |
| DF | Harry Jensen |
| DF | Dalhoff Jørgensen (Captain) |
| MF | Harald Christensen |
| MF | Ejner Hansen |
| MF | Egon Thon |
| FW | Børge Lunde |
| FW | Axel Villadsen |
| FW | Søren Andersen |
| FW | Kaj Mølback |
| FW | Aage Nielsen |

| GK | Normann |
| DF | Brockhof |
| DF | Thiim |
| MF | S. Thomsen |
| MF | Børge Schmidt |
| MF | N. Petersen |
| FW | Damgaard |
| FW | Rasmussen |
| FW | Aarslev Jensen |
| FW | Otto Nørgaard |
| FW | Honoré |

20 May 1928
2nd play-off

| Esbjerg fB | 0 – 3 | Aalborg BK |
|---|---|---|
| | | Alex Villadsen 30'; Søren Andersen 69', 74' |

Aarhus Stadium, Aarhus
Attendance: 550
Referee: Frede Højmark (Aarhus)

| Esbjerg fB | Aalborg BK |

| GK |
| DF |
| DF |
| MF |
| MF |
| MF |
| FW |
| FW |
| FW |
| FW |
| FW |

| GK | Folmer Olesen |
| DF | Harry Jensen |
| DF | Dalhoff Jørgensen (Captain) |
| MF | Harald Christensen |
| MF | Ejner Hansen |
| MF | Egon Thon |
| FW | Børge Lunde |
| FW | Axel Villadsen |
| FW | Søren Andersen |
| FW | Kaj Mølback |
| FW | Aage Nielsen |

Match rules

- 90 minutes.
- New match if win for Esbjerg fB.

== Promotion/relegation play-offs ==
Holstebro BK and BK Herning Fremad finished last in their respective groups and were relegated from the JBUs Mesterskabsrække after having lost in their respective promotion/relegation play-off matches against Brønderslev IF and Haderslev FK. Brønderslev IF had won the northern section of JBUs A-række, while Haderslev FK had won the southern section of JBUs A-række including winning the overall Jutland Championship Final of the JBUs A-Række at Randers on 17 June 1928. Both play-off matches were contested on neutral venues.

24 June 1928

| Brønderslev IF | 4 – 1 | Holstebro BK |
|---|---|---|
| Hans Henriksen 1h?'; Arnold Hansen 1h?', 2h?', 2h?' | | Rob. Krogh 2h?' (pen.) |

Randers Stadium, Randers
Attendance: 600
Referee: E. Hansen (Kolding)

| Brønderslev IF | Holstebro BK |

| GK | Hardy Christensen |
| DF |
| DF |
| MF |
| MF | Svend Sanvig |
| MF |
| FW | Aage Jensen |
| FW |
| FW | Arnold Hansen |
| FW | Hans Henriksen |
| FW | Jens Pedersen |

| GK | M. Olsen |
| DF |
| DF |
| MF |
| MF |
| MF |
| FW |
| FW | Tycho Poulsen |
| FW |
| FW | Rob. Krogh |
| FW |

24 June 1928

| Haderslev FK | 4 – 3 | BK Herning Fremad |
|---|---|---|
| ? 1'; ? 8'; ? 3?'; ? 35' | | H. P. Krogh 2'; ? 10'; ? 14' |

Vejle Stadium, Vejle
Attendance: 1,500

| Haderslev FK | BK Herning Fremad |

| GK |
| DF |
| DF |
| MF |
| MF |
| MF |
| FW |
| FW |
| FW |
| FW |
| FW |

| GK |
| DF |
| DF |
| MF |
| MF |
| MF |
| FW | H. P. Krogh |
| FW |
| FW |
| FW |
| FW |
