= Slagelse B&I =

Danish football club

- Full name: Slagelse Boldklub & Idrætsforening
- Short name: SBI
- Founded: 23 May 1887; 139 years ago
- Ground: Harboe Arena Slagelse
- Capacity: 10,000
- Chairman: Michael Birkedal
- Manager: Dani Mujkanovic
- League: Denmark Series
- Website: http://slagelseboldklub.dk/
Home colours	Away colours

Slagelse Boldklub & Idrætsforening, commonly known as Slagelse B&I, is a football club based in Slagelse, Denmark, that competes in the Denmark Series, the fifth tier of the Danish football league system. Founded in 1887, making it the fifth oldest club in the country, it is affiliated to DBU Zealand. The team plays its home matches at Slagelse Stadium, which has a capacity of 10,000. Between 2008 and 2015, the club's first team went under the name of FC Vestsjælland.

== History ==
The original club, Slagelse Boldklub, was formed on 23 May 1887, originally featuring cricket and later also association football. On 27 August 1919, it merged with Slagelse Idræts-Forening (founded 29 January 1907 at a meeting in the then "Schweitzer-Kaféen" on Schweizerpladsen with exclusively athletics on the program) under the current club name, Slagelse Boldklub & Idrætsforening (Slagelse B&I), but the new joint board decided to keep the founding date of Slagelse Boldklub. Slagelse Boldklub, which had always been a member of the Danish Football Association (DBU), was involved in the formation of the local association Sjællands Boldspil-Union (SBU) in 1902, where the club's then chairman joined its first board. After being represented in SBU's then Mesterrække since the 1931–32 season, the team managed to win the division in the 1937–38 season after two play-off matches in a local showdown against Western Zealand neighbours from Korsør Boldklub (rematch due to the same points; the series did not include goal difference yet). Thus, Slagelse secured promotion to nationwide divisions of the DBU for the first time in the club's history.

The Slagelse club made its first appearance in DBU's tournaments in the East group of the third-tier 3rd Series in the 1938–39 season, when Bornholm based IK Viking Rønne was defeated 6–0 at home on 21 August 1938. In the following years, the team reached promotion to the Danish top flight. During the German occupation of Denmark in World War II, Slagelse B&I were placed District 2 of DBU's emergency tournament for the Danish Championship, where they participated in the seasons 1941–42, 1942–43, 1943–44 and 1944–45. The best result during this period was an overall second place in their district, only ending behind the undefeated KFUMs Boldklub from Copenhagen in first place in the 1943–44 season, which sent the team on to the quarterfinals in the championship round, where they lost 11–1 to the later Danish champions from Boldklubben Frem. After five years of regional tournaments during the war, DBU decided to place Slagelse in the newly founded third-tier, the 3rd Division due to the club's performances. In the first ordinary season after the war, Slagelse finished in last place and suffered relegation to the then fourth-tier, the Zealand Series.

The club played its first season in the highest Danish football league since World War II in the 1974 Danish 1st Division. Slagelse B&I got relegated the following season, but returned to the top flight in 1978. The 1979 Danish 1st Division once again saw the club relegated, and they spent the following decades in the lower leagues of Danish football.

From January 2008 the elite team in the organisation was named FC Vestsjælland and was organised on a professional basis. The team won the 2008–09 Danish 2nd Division East in its first year of competition. It competed in the Danish 1st Division between 2009 and 2013 when, after finishing as runners-up in the 2012–13 season, the team was promoted to the Danish Superliga. They competed at the top level of Danish football for two seasons, being relegated after the 2014–15 season during which they also finished as runners-up in the 2014–15 Danish Cup competition.

After the relegation the club went bankrupt in December 2015 and was relegated to the Zealand Series, the fifth tier of Danish football, and began playing as an amateur side under the Slagelse B&I name.

Since then they have made their way up to the third division. The fourth tier of Danish football.

== Achievements ==
- Danish Cup:
  - Runners-up (1): 2014–15^{‡}
- Zealand Series
  - Winner (7): 1937–38, 1940–41, 1947–48, 1948–49, 1949–50, 1960, 1965
  - Runners-up (6): 1939–40, 1950–51, 1951–52, 1976^{‡}, 1998, 2016–17

^{‡}: As FC Vestsjælland
^{‡}: Honour achieved by reserve team
