= Poul Jensen (footballer, born 1899) =

Danish footballer (1899–1991)

Poul Andreas Joachim Jensen
Personal information
- Full name: Poul Andreas Joachim Jensen
- Date of birth: 25 November 1899
- Place of birth: Copenhagen, Denmark
- Date of death: 12 October 1991 (aged 91)
- Position: Defender

Senior career*
Years	Team	Apps	(Gls)
- B 93

International career
1921–1931	Denmark	30	(0)
- * Club domestic league appearances and goals

Poul Andreas Joachim Jensen (25 November 1899 – 12 October 1991) was a Danish amateur association football player, who played 30 games for the Denmark national football team from 1921 to 1931. Born in Copenhagen, Jensen played as a defender for B 93.
