= 1928–29 Danmarksmesterskabsturneringen =

National Football Tournament Danmarksmesterskabsturneringen
- Season: 1928–29
- Champions: Boldklubben af 1893

Statistics of Denmark Tournament in the 1928/1929 season.

== Overview ==
It was contested by 25 teams, and Boldklubben af 1893 won the championship.

== First phase ==
=== Series 1 ===
Pos	Team	Pld	W	D	L	GF	GA	GD	Pts
1	Aarhus Gymnastikforening	4	3	1	0	14	3	+11	7
2	Esbjerg fB	4	2	2	0	7	4	+3	6
3	Odense Boldklub	4	2	0	2	14	10	+4	4
4	Boldklubben 1903	4	1	1	2	11	10	+1	3
5	Østerbros Boldklub	4	0	0	4	6	25	−19	0

=== Series 2 ===
Pos	Team	Pld	W	D	L	GF	GA	GD	Pts
1	Kjøbenhavns Boldklub	4	3	0	1	9	4	+5	6
2	Aalborg Freja	4	2	1	1	14	11	+3	5
3	Skovshoved IF	4	2	1	1	6	5	+1	5
4	BK Fredericia	4	1	0	3	5	10	−5	2
5	Boldklubben 1909	4	1	0	3	4	8	−4	2

=== Series 3 ===
Pos	Team	Pld	W	D	L	GF	GA	GD	Pts
1	Boldklubben Frem	4	3	1	0	30	4	+26	7
2	Horsens fS	4	3	0	1	18	22	−4	6
3	Aalborg Boldspilklub	4	2	0	2	10	14	−4	4
4	FIF Hillerød	4	0	2	2	6	9	−3	2
5	Fremad Amager	4	0	1	3	7	22	−15	1

=== Series 4 ===
Pos	Team	Pld	W	D	L	GF	GA	GD	Pts
1	Boldklubben af 1893	4	3	0	1	18	3	+15	6
2	Hellerup IK	3	2	1	0	11	9	+2	5
3	Korsør Boldklub	4	1	2	1	9	13	−4	4
4	Boldklubben 1913	4	2	0	2	7	11	−4	4
5	B 1901	4	0	1	3	5	14	−9	1

=== Series 5 ===
Pos	Team	Pld	W	D	L	GF	GA	GD	Pts
1	Akademisk Boldklub	4	4	0	0	24	1	+23	8
2	Haslev IF	4	2	0	2	10	7	+3	4
3	Frem Saxkøbing	4	2	0	2	7	16	−9	4
4	Boldklubben Viktoria	4	1	1	2	9	15	−6	3
5	IK Viking Rønne	4	0	1	3	5	16	−11	1

== Second phase ==
Pos	Team	Pld	W	D	L	GF	GA	GD	Pts
1	Boldklubben af 1893	4	3	1	0	14	4	+10	7
2	Kjøbenhavns Boldklub	4	2	1	1	11	7	+4	5
3	Akademisk Boldklub	4	1	1	2	7	10	−3	3
4	Boldklubben Frem	4	1	1	2	6	13	−7	3
5	Aarhus Gymnastikforening	4	0	2	2	3	7	−4	2
