= 1925–26 Landsfodboldturneringen =

National Football Tournament Landsfodboldturneringen
- Season: 1925–26
- Champions: Boldklubben 1903

The 1925–26 Landsfodboldturneringen was the 13th edition of the Danish national football championship play-offs, a Danish FA-organised club football tournament between the championship clubs from each of the six regional football associations. In advance of the tournament, a play-off structure had been agreed, which meant that the winners of KBUs Mesterskabsrække were directly qualified for the national championship final against the winner of the Provincial championship tournament.

== Province tournament ==
=== First round ===
- IK Viking Rønne 1-2 Skovshoved IF (aet)

=== Second round ===
- Skovshoved IF 0-5 Boldklubben 1901
- Svendborg Boldklub 1-3 Horsens fS

=== Third round ===
- Boldklubben 1901 7-3 Horsens fS

== Copenhagen Championship ==
Pos	Team	Pld	W	D	L	GF	GA	GD	Pts
1	Boldklubben 1903	10	6	3	1	33	13	+20	15
2	Boldklubben af 1893	10	6	1	3	38	17	+21	13
3	Boldklubben Frem	10	6	0	4	36	36	0	12
4	Akademisk Boldklub	10	4	1	5	25	33	−8	9
5	Kjøbenhavns Boldklub	10	4	0	6	27	33	−6	8
6	KFUM	10	1	1	8	15	42	−27	3

== Final ==
- Boldklubben 1903 4-4 Boldklubben 1901

=== Replay 1 ===
- Boldklubben 1903 3-3 Boldklubben 1901

=== Replay 2 ===
- Boldklubben 1903 7-2 Boldklubben 1901
