= Skovshoved IF =

Danish football club

- Full name: Skovshoved Idrætsforening
- Nicknames: Skovserne, SIF
- Founded: 9 June 1909; 117 years ago
- Ground: Skovshoved Idrætspark, Klampenborg
- Capacity: 1,000 (no grandstands)
- Chairman: Jakob Buur Grandahl
- Head coach: Jonathan Nielsen
- League: Denmark Series
- 2025–26: Denmark Series group 2, 9th of 10; Relegation group east, 4th of 10
- Website: skovshoved-fodbold.dk
Home colours	Away colours

Skovshoved Idrætsforening, or Skovshoved IF, is a Danish sports club. The football team is currently playing in the fifth-tier Denmark Series. They play at Skovshoved Idrætspark (also referred to as Banen ved Krøyersvej) in Klampenborg north of Copenhagen. Skovshoved IF's most prominent time was earning silver medals in the 1926–27 and 1952–53 seasons of the Danish football championship. The badminton team of SIF was three times national champion.

== Honours ==
- Danish Football Championship
  - Runners-up (2): 1926–27, 1952–53
- Danish Cup
  - Round of 16 (4): 1954–55, 1959–60, 1991–92, 1997–98
- Provinsmesterskabsturneringen
  - Winners (1): 1926–27
  - Runners-up (1): 1928
- Zealand Football Championship
  - Winners (5): 1921–22, 1925–26, 1926–27, 1927–28, 1928–29
  - Runners-up (1): 1924–25
- Copenhagen Football Championship
  - Winners (4): 1939–40, 1941–42, 1946–47, 1969
  - Runners-up (5): 1937–38, 1940–41, 2004, 2010–11, 2015–16
- Forstadsklubbernes Pokalturnering
  - Runners-up (1): 1919

^{‡}: Honour achieved by reserve team

== Football Achievements ==
- 11 seasons in the Highest Danish League
- 9 seasons in the Second Highest Danish League
- 16 seasons in the Third Highest Danish League
