= Jutland Series =

Jyllandsserien for Herrer
- Founded: 1902; 124 years ago
- First season: 1902
- Country: Denmark
- Confederation: DBU Jutland (DBU)
- Divisions: 2
- Number of clubs: 32 (from 2008–09)
- Level on pyramid: 6 (from 2008)
- Promotion to: Denmark Series (4 divisions)
- Relegation to: Series 1 (6 divisions)
- Domestic cup(s): JBUs Pokalturnering (1924–1932); Danish Cup (1954–present)
- Current champions: IF Skjold Sæby (north group); VRI (south group) (2018–19)
- Current: 2024–25 season

Jutland Series (Danish: Jyllandsserien, JS, Herre Jyllandsserien) is the highest division for men organized by the regional association DBU Jylland and one of the fifth-highest divisions overall in the Danish football league system. The Jutland Association Football Championship (Danish: Jyllandsmesterskabet, JM) was introduced in 1902. At the introduction of the championship, the tournament was placed at the top of the Danish football league system, but has since been moved to its current status as the fifth best level in Danish football, after a short period as the sixth best level, below the Denmark Series at the fourth level.

The division has changed its name on numerous occasions. It has previously been known as A-rækken (up until 1921/22; or JBUs A-række, Række A) and Mesterskabsrækken (1922/23-1950/51; or JBUs Mesterskabsrække to distinguish it from the other regional leagues; unofficially shortened to Mesterrækken), before settling with the current name of Jyllandsserien in 1951, eventually becoming Jyllandsserien for Herrer (or Herre Jyllandsserien, shortened to JS) to distinguish it from the women's corresponding regional league, that was introduced in the 1970s.

== Jutland Championship winners ==
=== A-Rækken ===
Season	Level	Champions	Runners-up	Refs
1902 fall	1	SK Cimbria Aalborg	Horsens BK	
1903 spring	1	Aalborg BK	—N/a	
1903 fall	1	Aalborg FK	—N/a	
1904 spring	1	Aalborg FK	—N/a	
1904 fall	1	Aalborg FK	—N/a	
1905 spring	1	Aalborg FK	—N/a	
1905 fall	1	Aalborg FK	—N/a	
1906 spring	1	Aalborg FK	—N/a	
1906–07	1	Aalborg BK	—N/a	
1907–08	1	Aarhus GF	—N/a	
1908–09	1	Aarhus GF	—N/a	
1909–10	1	Aalborg BK	—N/a	
1910–11	1	Aalborg BK	—N/a	
1911–12	1	Vejle BK	—N/a	
1912–13	1	Vejle BK	—N/a	
1913–14	1	Vejle BK	—N/a	
1914–15	1	Vejle BK	—N/a	
1915–16	1	Randers SK Freja	—N/a	
1916–17	1	Randers SK Freja	—N/a	
1917–18	1	Randers SK Freja	—N/a	
1918–19	1	Aarhus GF	—N/a	
1919–20	1	Ringkjøbing IF	—N/a	
1920–21	1	Aarhus GF	—N/a	
1921–22	1	Aarhus GF	—N/a	

=== Mesterskabsrækken ===
Season	Level	Champions	Runners-up	Refs
1922–23	1	Aarhus GF	—N/a	
1923–24	1	Viborg FF	—N/a	
1924–25	1	Aarhus GF	—N/a	
1925–26	1	Horsens FS	—N/a	
1926–27	1	Horsens FS	Viborg FF	
1927–28	2	Aalborg BK	Esbjerg fB	
1928–29	2	Aalborg BK	—N/a	
1929–30	3	Aalborg BK	—N/a	
1930–31	3	Esbjerg fB	—N/a	
1931–32	3	Aalborg BK	—N/a	
1932–33	3	Aalborg BK	—N/a	
1933–34	3	Aarhus GF	—N/a	
1934–35	3	Aarhus GF	—N/a	
1935–36	3	Vejen SF	—N/a	
1936–37	4	Vejen SF	—N/a	
1937–38	4	Vejle BK	—N/a	
1938–39	4	Arbejdernes IK, Aarhus	—N/a	
1939–40	4	Not finished due to World War II		
1940–41	2	Randers SK Freja	—N/a	
1941–42	2	IK Aalborg Chang	—N/a	
1942–43	2	BK Herning Fremad	—N/a	
1943–44	2	Thisted IK	—N/a	
1944–45	2	Not finished due to World War II		
1945–46	4	BK Herning Fremad	—N/a	
1946–47	4	BK Herning Fremad	—N/a	
1947–48	4	Aarhus GF	—N/a	
1948–49	4	BK Herning Fremad	—N/a	
1949–50	4	BK Herning Fremad	—N/a	
1950–51	4	—N/a	—N/a	

=== Jyllandsserien ===
Season	Level	Champions	Runners-up	Refs
1951–52	4	—N/a	—N/a	

=== Jyllandsserien JM Final ===
Season	Level	Final Date	Winner	Result	Runners–up	Venue	Ref
1991	5	—N/a	Hobro IK	3–2	Kolding BK	—N/a	
1992	5	—N/a	Spjald IF	2–0	Hjørring IF	—N/a	
1993	5	—N/a	Vejle FC	5–1	Vejgaard BK	—N/a	
1994	5	—N/a	Lemvig GF	3–2	Vejle BK (II)	—N/a	
1995	5	—N/a	Ringkøbing IF	6–3 (a.e.t.)	Thisted FC	—N/a	
1996	5	—N/a	Vildbjerg SF	3–1	Aars IK	—N/a	
1997	5	—N/a	BK Herning Fremad (II)	9–1	Jetsmark IF	—N/a	
1998	6	—N/a	Søndermarken IK	7–3	Horsens fS (ACH II)	—N/a	
1999	6	—N/a	Thisted FC	3–1	Lystrup IF	—N/a	
2000	6	—N/a	Hobro IK	5–1	Sædding-Guldager IF	—N/a	
2001	6	—N/a	Brabrand IF	4–3	Lindholm IF	—N/a	
2002	6	—N/a	IK Aalborg Chang (FCN II)	3–0	Bramming BK	—N/a	
2003	6	2 November 2003	Grenaa IF	2–1	FC Horsens	Viby Idrætspark, Viby J	
2004	6	7 November 2004	Lemvig GF	3–1	Lindholm IF	Lemvig Stadion, Lemvig	
2005	6	5 November 2005	Esbjerg IF 92	3–1	Vivild IF	Brædstrup Stadion, Brædstrup	
2006	6	4 November 2006	Brabrand IF (II)	3–2	Kjellerup IF	Bjergets Idrætsanlæg, Kjellerup	
2007	6	3 November 2007	Aars IK	2–1	Odder IGF	Spektrum Park, Odder	
2008 spring	6	Not awarded due to transitional period					—N/a
2008–09	5	26 June 2009	Kolding IF (KFC II)	6–5	Aalborg KFUM	Bavnehøj Idrætsanlæg, Hadsten	
2009–10	5	30 June 2010	Frederikshavn fI	w/o	Brabrand IF (II)	neutral ground	
2010–11	5	25 June 2011	FC Sønderborg	2–0	Aars FC	Langskovhallen Ølholm, Tørring	
2011–12	5	23 June 2012	IF Lyseng	3–0	Kolding BK (VBK III)	Givskud Stadion, Give	
2012–13	5	20 June 2013	Aabyhøj IF	4–1	Hjørring IF (VFF II)	Klejtrup Stadion, Hobro	
2013–14	5	21 June 2014	FC Sønderborg	4–3	Lystrup IF	Madsby Enge, Fredericia	
2014–15	5	20 June 2015	Aarhus Fremad (II)	7–5	Vejgaard BK	Mariager Stadion, Mariager	

=== Jyllandsserien ===
Season	Level	Champions Group 1	Runners-up Group 1	Champions Group 2	Runners-up Group 2	Refs
2015–16	5	IK Skovbakken	IF Skjold Sæby	Esbjerg fB (II)	Fredericia fF	
2016–17	5	Viby IF	—N/a	Hedensted IF	—N/a	
2017–18	5	Nørresundby FB	—N/a	Silkeborg KFUM	—N/a	
2018–19	5	IF Skjold Sæby	—N/a	VRI	—N/a	
2019–20	5	No champions due to COVID-19				

Season	Level	Champions Group 1	Champions Group 2	Champions Group 3	Refs
2020–21	5	AaB (II)	Fuglebakken KFUM	ASA	

Season	Level	Champions Group 1	Runners-up Group 1	Champions Group 2	Runners-up Group 2	Refs
2021–22	6	FC Djursland	—N/a	Viby IF	—N/a	
2022–23	6	Vorup FB	—N/a	Horsens fS	—N/a	
