= Zealand Series =

Sjællandsserien
- Founded: 1902; 124 years ago (cup format); 1927; 99 years ago (league format)
- Country: Denmark
- Confederation: DBU Zealand (DBU)
- Divisions: 2
- Number of clubs: 24 (from 2015–16)
- Level on pyramid: 6
- Promotion to: Denmark Series (4 divisions)
- Relegation to: Series 1, group 1 (north Zealand); Series 1, group 2 (south Zealand); Lolland-Falster Series
- Domestic cup: Danish Cup
- Current champions: IF Skjold Birkerød (2016–17)
- Current: 2024–25 season

Zealand Series (Danish: Sjællandsserien, SS, Herre Sjællandsserien) is the highest division for men organized by the regional association DBU Sjælland and one of the sixth-highest divisions overall in the Danish football league system. The Zealand Association Football Championship (Danish: Sjællandsmesterskabet, SM) was introduced a week after the association's foundation in 1902 and was played in a cup format until actual league formats organized on a double round-robin basis including promotions and relegations were introduced in 1927 with the highest ranking division being named Mesterrækken (or SBUs Mesterrække to distinguish it from the other regional leagues).

At the time of the league's introduction, it was placed at the top of the Danish football league system, but has since been moved to its current status as the sixth best level, below the Denmark Series at the fifth level.

== History ==
Only one week after the foundation of the second regional football association, Zealand Football Association (SBU), the first tournament between member clubs was started. The first tournament was played in a cup format with the participation of 13 teams and a final match, a tournament format that was kept until 1917. In 1918, the teams started playing a double tournament format (autumn–spring). At the annual general assembly in 1927, the decision of introducing an actual league format for the best member teams was passed, creating the Mesterrækken (SBU level 1) and the A-rækken (SBU level 2) with promotions and relegations in a double year-long format (autumn-spring) under the auspices of the football association. In 1910, no tournament winner was declared. I finale match ended in a tie and a new date for the replay match was not found. Due to World War I, the Danish football tournaments in 1914–1915 were completed with great difficulties and almost ceased to exist - only eight teams participated in the local tournament administrated by SBU.

Despite difficulties with transportation (especially using cars) during World War II, the football tournaments under Sjællands Boldspil-Union in 1940–1942 managed to complete almost without any cancellations, and continued in a reduced format until the end of the war in 1945. Mesterrækken (SBU level 1), Oprykningsrækken (SBU level 2) and A-rækken (SBU level 3) completed the scheduled matches in autumn 1944, but due to restrictions on the usage of trains during Sundays, many cancellations occurred in spring 1945. A wartime crisis tournament was set up instead, where teams played in small (local) regional tournaments and all promotions and relegations were suspended.

Immediately following World War II, the Danish Football Association (DBU) annulled the national wartime league tournaments and introduces a new national league structure for the top tree levels (Danmarksturneringen i fodbold) with ten teams in each league. Promotion to the third division went through the top amateur leagues organized by the six regional football associations, at that moment in time located as the fourth level in Danish association football, where each league winner entered play-off matches against the other regional league winners. The highest ranking senior men's league administrated by DBU Zealand was renamed from Mesterrækken to Sjællandsserien, while the league below was renamed from Oprykningsrækken to Mellemrækken, beginning with the 1945/46-season.

As a consequence of the new league restructuring introduced by the national football association for the higher national levels, on 5 September 2014 at a board meeting of the committee the regional association of Zealand decided to adopt a new league structure for their own highest league competition. Starting from the 2015–16-season, the best men's league would be split into two geographically organized groups with 12 teams, where the group winners are each secured a direct promotion spot to Denmark Series, while the runners-up play an additional single match on a neutral field for a third promotion spot to the fourth level in Danish football. The losing team will enter into a play-off match against one of the league runners-up from the other regional associations. Also the Lolland-Falster Series, that have historically always been located at the same level as the Zealand Series, would drop a level and would instead become a feeder league to the Zealand Series with two promotion spots following an agreement made with DBU Lolland-Falster. DBU Lolland-Falster saw the difference in level between the teams in the Lolland-Falster Series and the Denmark Series being too high.

== Zealand Championship winners ==
Beginning with the 2015–16 season, the two group winners in a given season enters a play-off final match against each other to determine the Zealand Championship (Sjællandsmesterskabet) - both are automatically promoted to the Denmark Series. The runners-up in both group enter a play-off match against each other on a neutral playing field for the right to enter the Denmark Series, while the losing team will get an additional chance by playing one extra play-off match against a league runner-up from another regional association. Teams placing in the bottom are automatically relegated to the Series 1 leagues and Lolland-Falster Series respectively.

=== SBU's 1. Holdsturnering play-off Finals ===
Season	Level	Champions	Runners-up
1902 fall	1 (Note: Between 1902 and 1912, there was no national championship playoff and the regional championships were the highest level, that the clubs could reach, so in principle level 1.)	Holbæk IF	Vordingborg Seminariums Boldklub
1903 spring	1	Holbæk IF	Næstved AIK
1903–04	1	Helsingør IF	Vordingborg Seminariums Boldklub
1904–05	1	Helsingør IF	Holbæk IF
1905–06	1	Helsingør IF	Vordingborg Seminariums Boldklub
1906–07	1	Helsingør IF	Slagelse Boldklub
1907 fall	1	Helsingør IF	Slagelse Boldklub
1908 spring	1	Helsingør IF	Roskilde Boldklub
1908 fall	1	IF Frem Vordingborg	Helsingør IF
1909 spring	1	Helsingør IF	Holmegaard Glasværks Boldklub
1909 fall	1	IF Frem Vordingborg	Roskilde Boldklub
1910 spring	1	Haslev IK	Helsingør IF
1910 fall	1	Haslev IK	Holbæk IF
1911 spring	1	No Winner (Note: The final match between Helsingør IF and Holbæk IF ended 2-2. Due to difficulties with regard to scheduling the date for the replay match, no winner for the 1911 spring edition was found and the tournament was left undecided.)	
1911 fall	1	Frederiksborg IF Hillerød	Næstved IK
1912 spring	1	Frederiksborg IF Hillerød	Næstved IK
1912–13	2	Frederiksborg IF Hillerød	Haslev IK
1913–14	2	Frederiksborg IF Hillerød	IF Frem Vordingborg
1914–15	2 (Note: No final national playoff tournament was played due to World War I. The level for Zealand Series within the overall Danish football league system was kept this season.)	Helsingør IF	Næstved IK
1915–16	2	Frederiksborg IF Hillerød	Næstved IK
1916–17	2	Frederiksborg IF Hillerød	Næstved IK

=== A-rækken play-off Finals ===
Season	Level	Champions	Runners-up
1917–18	2	Frederiksborg IF Hillerød	Næstved IK
1918–19	2	Korsør Boldklub	Køge G&IF
1919–20	2	Boldklubben Søstjernen	Korsør Boldklub
1920–21	2	Helsingør IF	Korsør Boldklub
1921–22	2	Skovshoved IF	Korsør Boldklub
1922–23	2	Frederiksborg IF Hillerød	Korsør Boldklub
1923–24	2	Holbæk IF	Frederiksborg IF Hillerød

=== A-rækkens Kredsvinderturnering ===
Season	Level	Champions	Runners-up
1924–25	2	Korsør Boldklub	Skovshoved IF
1925–26	2	Skovshoved IF	Holbæk Boldklub
1926–27	2	Skovshoved IF	Korsør Boldklub

=== Mesterskabsrækken ===
Season	Level	Champions	Runners-up
1927–28	2	Skovshoved IF	Frederiksborg IF Hillerød
1928–29	2	Skovshoved IF	Korsør Boldklub
1929–30	3	Frederiksborg IF Hillerød	Næstved Boldklub
1930–31	3	Helsingør IF	Haslev IF
1931–32	3	Næstved Boldklub	Helsingør IF
1932–33	3	Helsingør IF	Næstved Boldklub
1933–34	3	Helsingør IF	Næstved Boldklub
1934–35	3	Korsør Boldklub	Helsingør IF
1935–36	3	Helsingør IF	Køge Boldklub
1936–37	4 (Note: The 1935/36-season of the Danmarksturneringen i fodbold consisted of two levels (with a total of three divisions) with each team playing in a single round-robin schedule and at the same time participating in the regional leagues. The 1936/37-season introduced a new third level in the Danmarksturneringen i fodbold (four divisions in total), where each division had a double round-robin schedule. The teams in the top two levels did not participate in the regional leagues, while the teams at the third levels still took part in the regional tournaments.)	Holbæk B&IF	Gentofte-Vangede IF
1937–38	4	Slagelse BK&IF	Korsør Boldklub
1938–39	4	Korsør Boldklub	Frederiksborg IF Hillerød
1939–40	4	Næstved IF	Slagelse BK&IF
1940–41	2 (Note: During World War II, the Danish Football Association (DBU) suspended the then national league structure, consisting of three divisional series, with clubs instead being divided geographically into regional groups using one flat structure, though eliminating two levels in the Danish football league system for the entire period (1940–1945). Each regional champions qualified to play in one of the regional series.)	Slagelse BK&IF	Næstved IF
1941–42	2	Haslev IF	Lyngby Boldklub
1942–43	2	Haslev IF	Næstved IF
1943–44	2	Næstved IF	Lyngby Boldklub
1944–45	2	Not finished	

=== Sjællandsserien ===
Season	Level	Champions	Runners-up
1945–46	4 (Note: After World War II, the nation-wide tournament, "Danmarksturneringen i fodbold", were resumed with 3 leagues, which meant that all the regional championship leagues were lowered to tier 4 in the Danish football league system.)	IF Skjold Birkerød	Lendemark Boldklub
1946–47	4	Lyngby Boldklub	Ringsted IF
1947–48	4	Slagelse BK&IF	Holbæk B&IF
1948–49	4	Slagelse BK&IF	Lyngby Boldklub
1949–50	4	Slagelse BK&IF	Lyngby Boldklub
1950–51	4	Kalundborg GF&BK	Slagelse BK&IF
1951–52	4	Roskilde B1906	Slagelse BK&IF
1952–53	4	Lyngby Boldklub	Korsør Boldklub
1953–54	4	Lendemark Boldklub	Korsør Boldklub
1954–55	4	IF Skjold Birkerød	Roskilde B1906
1955–56	4	IF Skjold Birkerød	Roskilde B1906
1956–57	4	Lyngby Boldklub	Frederiksborg IF Hillerød
1958	4	Roskilde B1906	Køge Boldklub (II)
1959	5 (Note: Beginning with the 1959 edition, the 'Kvalifikationsturneringen' switched from being an end-of-the-season qualifying tournament for promotion to the 3rd Division to becoming a full season league and a part of league structure of "Danmarksturneringen i fodbold". With the introduction of the new league, nicknamed '4th Division', the Zealand Series within the overall Danish football league system was dropped by one level.)	Lyngby Boldklub	Køge Boldklub (II)
1960	5	Slagelse BK&IF	Glostrup IC
1961	5	Køge Boldklub (II)	Holbæk B&IF
1962	5	Kalundborg GF&BK	Lendemark Boldklub
1963	5	Holte IF	Frederiksborg IF Hillerød
1964	5	IF Skjold Birkerød	Akademisk Boldklub (II)
1965	5	Slagelse BK&IF	Holte IF
1966	5	Helsingør IF	Akademisk Boldklub (II)
1967	5	Ballerup IF	Herlev IF
1968	5	Herlev IF	Store Merløse IF
1969	5	Lyngby Boldklub (II)	IF 32 Glostrup
1970	5	Akademisk Boldklub (II)	IF 32 Glostrup
1971	5	Brøndby IF (Note: In the 1971 edition, the top two teams (Brøndby IF and Toksværd G&IF) finished with the equal points at the end of the season. Even though, Toksværd G&IF had a better overall goal difference between against Brøndby IF, this season the tie was broken using goal difference for the two matches those clubs had played against each other. More specifically: round 10 on 12 June 1971 at 19:00 Toksværd G&IF–Brøndby IF 2–4 and round 22 on 7 November 1971 at 10:00 Brøndby–Toksværd 2–1.)	Toksværd G&IF
1972	5	Næstved IF (II)	Nivå GF
1973	5	Lyngby Boldklub (II)	Knabstrup IF
1974	5	Holbæk B&IF (II)	Knabstrup IF
1975	5	Lyngby Boldklub (II)	Jyderup SG&IF
1976	5	Jyderup SG&IF	Slagelse BK&IF (II)
1977	5	Næstved IF (II)	Hørsholm-Usserød IK
1978	5	Boldklubben Avarta	Vordingborg IF
1979	5	Akademisk Boldklub (II)	IF Skjold Birkerød
1980	5	Lyngby Boldklub (II)	Greve IF
1981	5	Brøndby IF (II)	Skovlunde IF
1982	5	Greve IF	Albertslund IF
1983	5	Kalundborg GF&BK	Avedøre IF
1984	5	Humlebæk Boldklub	Albertslund IF
1985	5	Ringsted IF	Næstved IF (II)
1986	5	Ølstykke FC	Espergærde IF
1987	5	Hørsholm-Usserød IK	Herlev IF
1988	5	Vordingborg IF	Humlebæk Boldklub
1989	5	Næstved IF (II)	Roskilde B1906 (II)
1990	5	Herfølge Boldklub (II)	Lundtofte Boldklub
1991	5 (Note: In the summer of 1991, one of the several changes to the format of the Danmarksturneringen i fodbold, was the introduction of the Kvalifikationsligaen in the spring section of the season, which meant that the levels in the overall Danish football league system was dropped by one, while at the same time being increased by one in the autumn season. This tournament format lasted until the spring of 1995.)	Hillerød G&IF	Kalundborg GF&BK
1992	6→5	Næstved IF (II)	Akademisk Boldklub (II)
1993	6→5	Lillerød IF	Herfølge Boldklub (II)
1994	6→5	Skovlunde IF	Nivå GF
1995	6→5	Kalundborg GF&BK	Holbæk B&IF
1996	5	Nivå GF	Farum Boldklub
1997	5	Vedbæk Boldklub	Albertslund IF
1998	6 (Note: The Kvalifikationsrækken were introduced in the spring of 1998 by the Danish Football Association as a buffer zone between the higher ranking level's autumn-spring season format and the lower ranking level's spring-autumn season formats. This meant, that the Zealand Series within the overall Danish football league system was dropped by one level. The tournament was discontinued in the summer of 2008 and the level of the Zealand Series was increased.)	Holbæk B&IF (II)	Slagelse BK&IF
1999	6	Gladsaxe-Hero Boldklub	IF 32 Glostrup (II)
2000	6	Søllerød Boldklub	Køge Boldklub (II)
2001	6	Farum Boldklub (II)	Avedøre IF
2002	6	Hørsholm-Usserød IK	Greve IF
2003	6	KFUM Roskilde	Herlev IF
2004	6	Skovlunde IF	Nivå-Kokkedal FK
2005	6	Lyngby Boldklub (II)	Allerød FK
2006	6	Køge Boldklub (II)	Rishøj Boldklub
2007	6	Fredensborg BK&IF	Solrød FC
2008 spring	6	Næstved IF (NB II)	Svebølle BK&IF
2008–09	5	Frederikssund IK	Rishøj Boldklub
2009–10	5	FC Øresund	Ledøje-Smørum Fodbold
2010–11	5	B1973 Herlev	Fredensborg BK&IF
2011–12	5	Ledøje-Smørum Fodbold	Virum-Sorgenfri Boldklub
2012–13	5	KFUM Roskilde	Fredensborg BK&IF
2013–14	5	Kalundborg GF&BK	Næstved IF (NB II)
2014–15	5	Hillerød Fodbold	Virum-Sorgenfri Boldklub

=== Sjællandsserien SM Final ===
Season	Level	Final Date	Winner	Result	Runners–up	Venue	Ref
2015–16	5	18 June 2016	Stenløse BK	1–1 (5–3 pen.)	Herlufsholm GF	Herlufsholm Kunstgræsbane, Næstved	(Note: After full time the match was tied and the match went directly to penalty shootout for a winner to be found, skipping the extra time.)
2016–17	5	17 June 2017	IF Skjold Birkerød	2–0	Slagelse BK&IF	Slagelse Stadium, Slagelse	
2017–18	5	16 June 2018	Allerød FK	5–2	Ishøj IF	Allerød Idrætspark, Allerød	
2018–19	5	20 June 2019	Køge Nord FC	6–0	Frederikssund IK	Rishøj Stadium, Køge	
2019–20	5	Not finished due to COVID-19					(Note: During the COVID-19 pandemic in Denmark, the Danish Football Association (DBU) suspended the national league structure, with only the fourth highest tiers reaching a conclusion. The regional leagues were cancelled, and the first places, RB 1906 and Vordingborg IF, received automatic promotion to the Denmark Series.)
