= DBU Jutland =

Sports governing body in Jutland, Denmark

- Abbreviation: DBUJ
- Formation: 1 December 1895; 130 years ago
- Headquarters: Tilst
- Location(s): Region 1: Aalborg Øst Region 2: Holstebro Region 3: Tilst Region 4: Glejbjerg
- Chairman: Bent Clausen
- Website: www.dbujylland.dk

DBU Jutland (Danish: DBU Jylland) is the local governing body for association football and futsal in Jutland, Denmark. They are responsible for the governance and development of men's and women's football at all levels in the region. DBU Jutland is a member of the Union of Local Football Associations in Denmark (FLU; became "DBU Bredde" in 2020) under the Danish Football Association (DBU) and National Olympic Committee and Sports Confederation of Denmark (DIF). The headquarters is located in Tilst in the western part of Aarhus. Clubs situated in Jutland and surrounding areas, covering the postal codes between 6000-9999, can be accepted as members of DBU Jutland. In 2019, the football association consisted of 903 clubs and 162,268 members with IF Lyseng being the largest club membership-wise. Founded on 1 December 1895, it is the oldest regional football association under the Danish FA, and was originally created as a counterpart to the Danish FA. The association kept its original name, Jyllands Boldspil-Union (JBU), until 1 February 2011, where it was changed to its current name, DBU Jylland.

== Competitions ==
As of 2016, the football association administers the local men's senior leagues at level 5 in the Danish football league system besides women's and youth football. The top league at the local senior men's level under the football association's administration is called Jyllandsserien and was regarded as one among several top regional leagues in Danish football between 1902 and 1927. Before the national "knockout" cup competition, DBU Pokalen, was introduced in 1954, the football association had its own regional cup competitions known as JBUs Pokalturnering, which was contested between 1924 and 1933. Clubs playing at the lower leagues participate in the qualification rounds for the first round proper of DBU Pokalen.

DBU Jutland is separated into 4 regions:

- Region 1: North Jutland
- Region 2: West Jutland
- Region 3: East Jutland
- Region 4: South Jutland

=== Senior Men's ===
- Leagues
  - Jyllandsserien (transl. Jutland Series)
  - Serie 1 (transl. Series 1)
  - Serie 2 (transl. Series 2)
  - Serie 3 (transl. Series 3)
  - Serie 4 (transl. Series 4)
  - Serie 5 (transl. Series 5)
  - Serie 6 (transl. Series 6)
- Cups
  - Qualification for DBU Pokalen (transl. The DBU Cup)
  - DBU Jyllands Pokalturnering (Pokalturneringen) for different age groups from between U13 and U19

=== Senior Women's ===
- Leagues
  - Jyllandsserien Kvinder (transl. Women's Jutland Series)
  - Kvinder Serie 1 (transl. Women's Series 1)
  - Kvinder Serie 2 (transl. Women's Series 2)
- Cups
  - Qualification for DBU Kvindepokalen (transl. The DBU's Women's Cup)
  - Damesenior Pokalturnering (Seriepokalen for Kvinder) for clubs playing in Jyllandsserien Kvinder to Series 2

=== Defunct ===
- JBUs Pokalturnering (1924–1933) for the JBU member clubs
