= Skovshoved =

Village in Denmark

Coordinates: 55.7597°N 12.5894°E

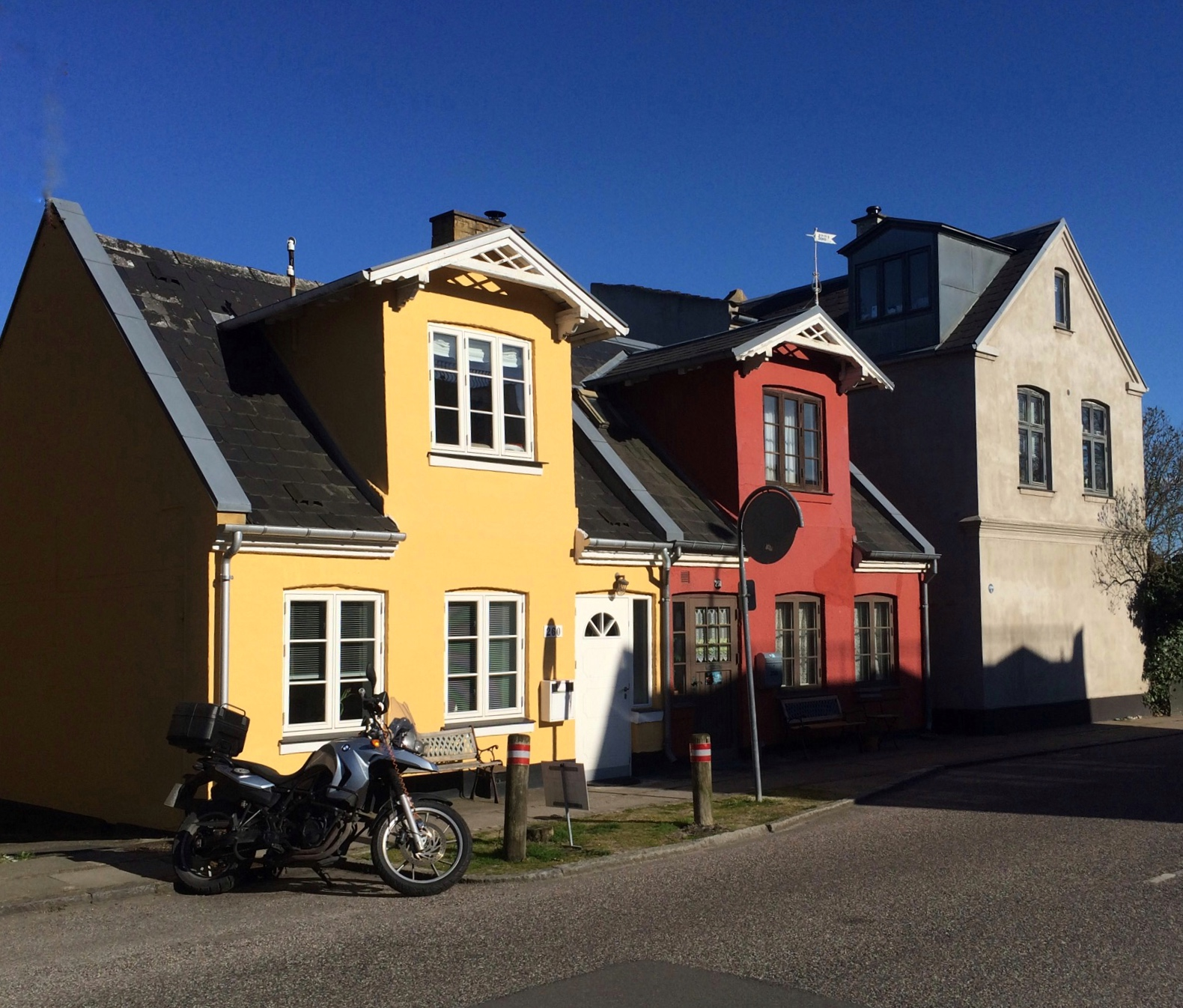
Old houses in Skovshoved

Skovshoved is a former fishing village on the Øresund coast north of Copenhagen, Denmark. The area is part of Charlottenlund postal district and Gentofte Municipality. Local landmarks include Skovshoved Church, Skovshoved Hotel and the listed Arne Jacobsen-designed Skovshoved Petrol Station from 1938.

== History ==
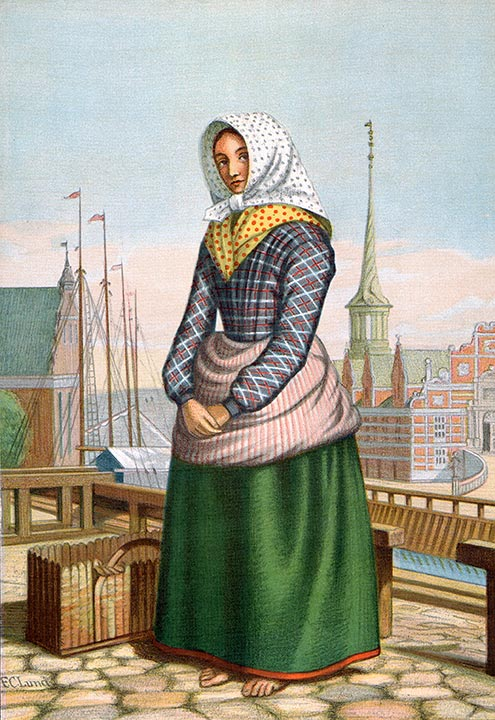
"A Girl from Skovshoved", selling fish at Gammel Strand, 1864

The first known reference to Skovshoved (Scogshouet) is from 1275. It was originally a small fishing village with just a few houses. An inn, Skovshoved Kro, opened in the village in 1660. In 1620 it obtained status of royal privileged inn, enabling it to brew its own beer.

Skovshoved was known for its fish wives, Skovserkoner, who would carry the day's catch in caskets on their back to the fish market at Gammel Strand in Copenhagen. The first harbor was built in 1869.

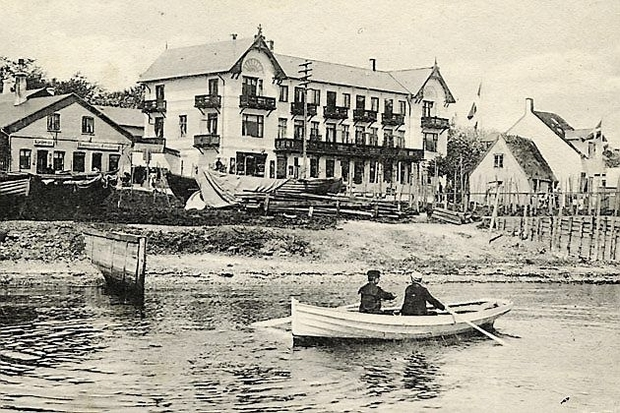
Skovshoved Beach Hotel in c. 1908

In the middle of the 19th century, Skovshoved, like the other fishing villages along the Øresund coast, began to attract summer visitors from Copenhagen. Some visitors stayed at the inn while others rented rooms with the local fishermen. With the opening of the Klampenborg Railway in 1863 and the Coast Line the area became more accessible. The more wealthy summer visitors began to build country houses. Skovshoved Inn was converted into a modern beach hotel by the architects Viggo Klein and Andreas Thejll in 1895.

Skovshoved Parish was disjoined from that of Ordrup in 1915. With the construction of the new Coastal Road in 1936-38, Skovshoved gradually developed into a suburb of Copenhagen. A new and larger harbor was built in 1938.

== Landmarks ==
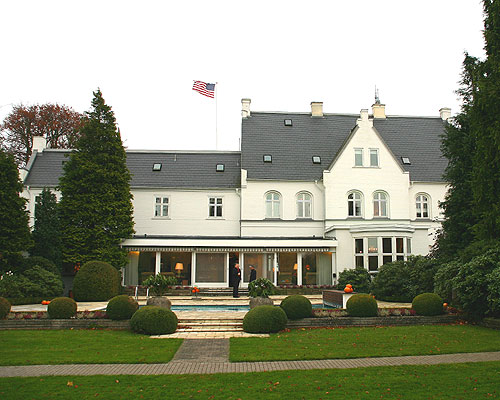
Rydhave, the residence of the US Ambassador

Much of the old fishing village has survived. Rydhave, now the official residence of the United States' Ambassador to Denmark, is an example of the country houses that were built in the area in the late 19th and early 20th century. It was built in 1885 for E. Schackenborg, the owner of a brickyard. The 22-room Skovshoved Hotel has been listed as one of the world's 50 top hotels by Condé Nast in 2003.

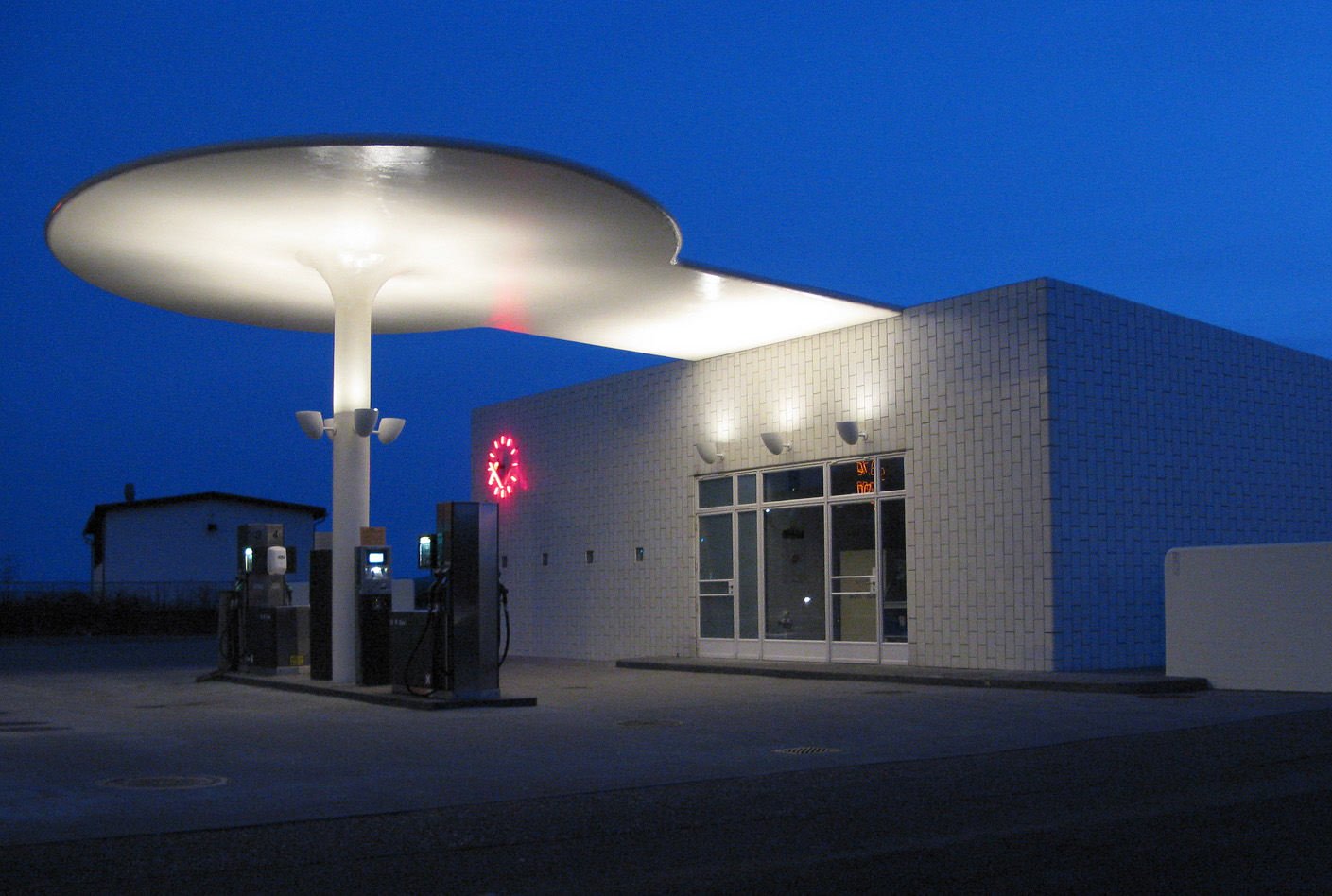
Skovshoved Petrol Station

Skovshoved Church is from 1915 and was designed by Alfred Brandt. The listed Skovshoved Petrol Station was completed to a Modernist design by Arne Jacobsen in 1936.

== In media and culture ==
- In the 2014–15 DR documentary series I Am the Ambassador, which followed the US ambassador Rufus Gifford, Rydhave featured prominently.

== Notable people ==
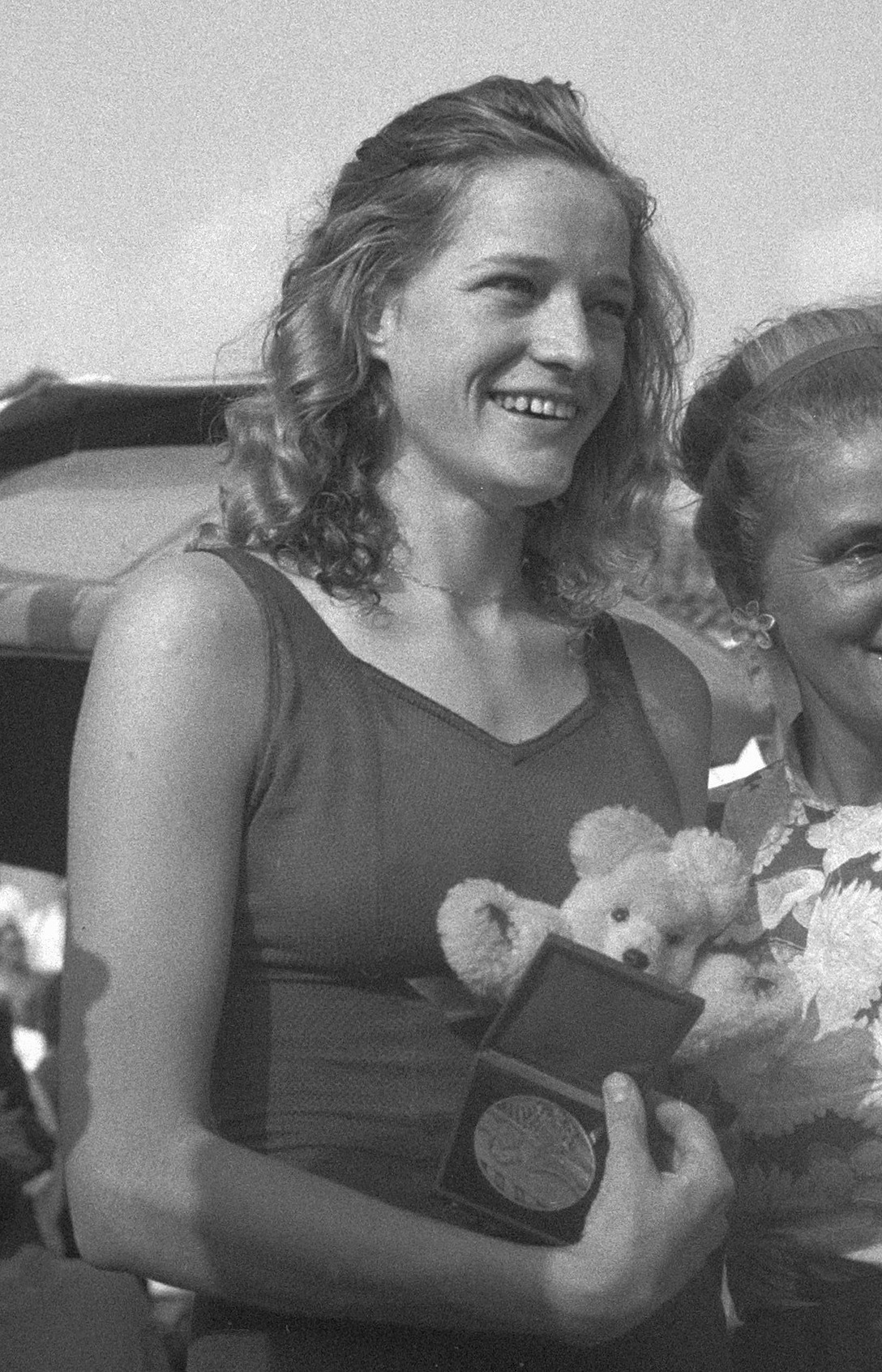
Karen Harup, 1947

- Meyer Herman Bing (1807 - 1883 in Skovshoved) a Danish businessman, a co-founder of Bing & Grøndahl
- Carl Brummer (1864 – 1953 in Skovshoved) an architect, influential in the design of homes
- Julie Fagerholt (born 1968) a Danish fashion designer, grew up in Skovshoved
- Kasper Eistrup (born 1973 in Skovshoved), musician with Kashmir

=== Sport ===
- Kurt Nielsen (1924 in Skovshoved – 1986) a Danish professional footballer, manager and coach of the Denmark national football team from 1976 to 1979
- Inge Sørensen (1924 in Skovshoved - 2011) a Danish swimmer, who at age 12 won a bronze medal in the 200 metre breaststroke at the 1936 Summer Olympics
- Karen Harup (1924 in Skovshoved – 2009) a Danish swimmer, won a gold and two silver medals at the 1948 Summer Olympics
