= DBU Bornholm =

Sports governing body in Bornholm, Denmark

BBU logo

DBU Bornholm (Bornholm Football Association Danish: Bornholms Boldspil-Union until 1 February 2011) is a district branch of the Danish Football Association, DBU Bornholm representing the Danish FA's football clubs on the island of Bornholm. The Danish FA's is a member of both FIFA and UEFA.

DBU Bornholm was founded on 28 March 1907 and is based in Rønne. It is a member of the Association of Local Football Unions in Denmark Foreningen af Lokalunioner i Danmark (FLU) which associated with both the Danish Football Association (DBU) and the Sports Confederation of Denmark (Danmarks Idræts-Forbund, (DIF)). Only clubs based on Bornholm are eligible for membership of DBU Bornholm.

DBU Bornholm is the youngest and smallest of the DBU's district branches, and has a membership of 19 clubs, representing roughly 1.2% of the DBU's total number of football clubs (2005-figures).

January 1, 2022 – Grassroots reorg: Under the “Breddeaftalen” agreement, DBU Bornholm was merged into the new DBU Bredde Øst regional association (along with DBU Sjælland, DBU København and DBU Lolland-Falster), effective 1 January 2022

April 2024 – Record membership: DBU Bornholm’s membership rose to 2,300—the highest in the past decade (up from 2,275 in 2014)
