= DBU Zealand =

Sports governing body in Zealand, Denmark

- Abbreviation: SBU
- Formation: 14 September 1902; 123 years ago
- Purpose: Football association
- Location: Himmelev
- Chairman: Jakob Koed
- Website: www.dbusjaelland.dk

DBU Zealand (Danish: DBU Sjælland) is the local governing body for association football and futsal on Zealand, Denmark. They are responsible for the governance and development of men's and women's football at all levels in the region. DBU Zealand is a member of the Union of Local Football Associations in Denmark (FLU; became "DBU Bredde" in 2020) under the Danish Football Association (DBU) and National Olympic Committee and Sports Confederation of Denmark (DIF). The headquarters is located in Himmelev in the northern part of Roskilde. Clubs situated on Zealand and surrounding areas, covering the postal codes between 3000-3699 and 4000–4999, respectively, can be accepted as members of DBU Zealand. In 2017 the football association consisted of 370 clubs and 86,132 members with Brøndby IF being the largest club membership-wise. Founded on 14 September 1902, it is the second oldest regional football association under the Danish FA and kept its original name, Sjællands Boldspil-Union (SBU), until 1 February 2011, where it was changed to its current name, DBU Sjælland.

== Competitions ==
As of 2016, the football association administers the local men's senior leagues at level 5 in the Danish football league system besides women's and youth football. The top league at the local senior men's level under the football association's administration is called Sjællandsserien and was regarded as one among several top regional leagues in Danish football between 1902 and 1927. Before the national "knockout" cup competition, DBU Pokalen, was introduced in 1954, the football association had its own regional cup competitions known as SBUs Pokalturnering, which was contested between 1949 and 1953. Clubs playing at the lower leagues participate in the qualification rounds for the first round proper of DBU Pokalen.

=== Senior Men's ===
- Leagues
  - Sjællandsserien (transl. Zealand Series)
  - Serie 1 (transl. Series 1)
  - Serie 2 (transl. Series 2)
  - Serie 3 (transl. Series 3)
  - Serie 4 (transl. Series 4)
  - Serie 5 (transl. Series 5)
  - Serie 6 (transl. Series 6)
- Cups
  - Qualification for DBU Pokalen (transl. The DBU Cup)
  - Herresenior Pokalturnering (Seriepokalen) for clubs playing in Series 2 to Series 6

=== Senior Women's ===
- Leagues
  - Kvinde Sjællandsserien (transl. Women's Zealand Series)
  - Kvinde Serie 1 (transl. Women's Series 1)
  - Kvinde Serie 2 (transl. Women's Series 2)
- Cups
  - Qualification for DBU Kvindepokalen (transl. The DBU's Women's Cup)
  - Damesenior Pokalturnering (Seriepokalen for Kvinder) for clubs playing in Kvinde Sjællandsserien to Series 2

=== Defunct ===
- SBUs Pokalturnering (1949–1953) for the SBU member clubs
