= 1927 KBUs Pokalturnering =

1927 KBU Cup

Tournament details
- Country: Denmark
- Venue(s): Københavns Idrætspark, Copenhagen
- Dates: 28 August – 6 November 1927
- Teams: 8

Final positions
- Champions: BK Frem (2nd title)
- Runners-up: B.93

Tournament statistics
- Matches played: 8
- Goals scored: 50 (6.25 per match)
- Attendance: 40,000 (5,000 per match)
- Top goal scorer(s): Børge Mørch; Pauli Jørgensen (5 goals each)
- Total matches and goals played include replays

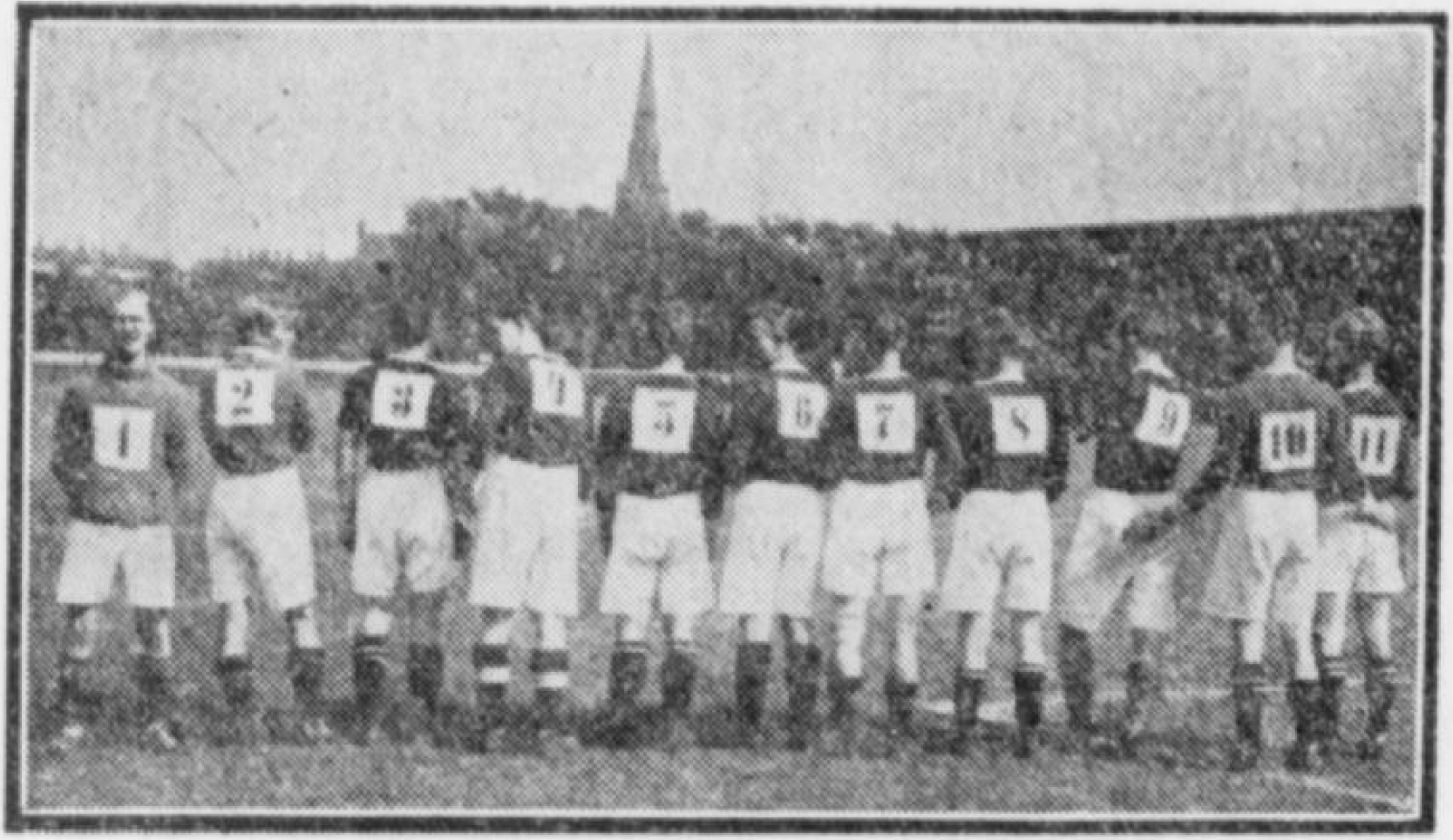
The Handelsstandens BK players showcasing the experimental squad numbers before the first round match against Østerbros BK.

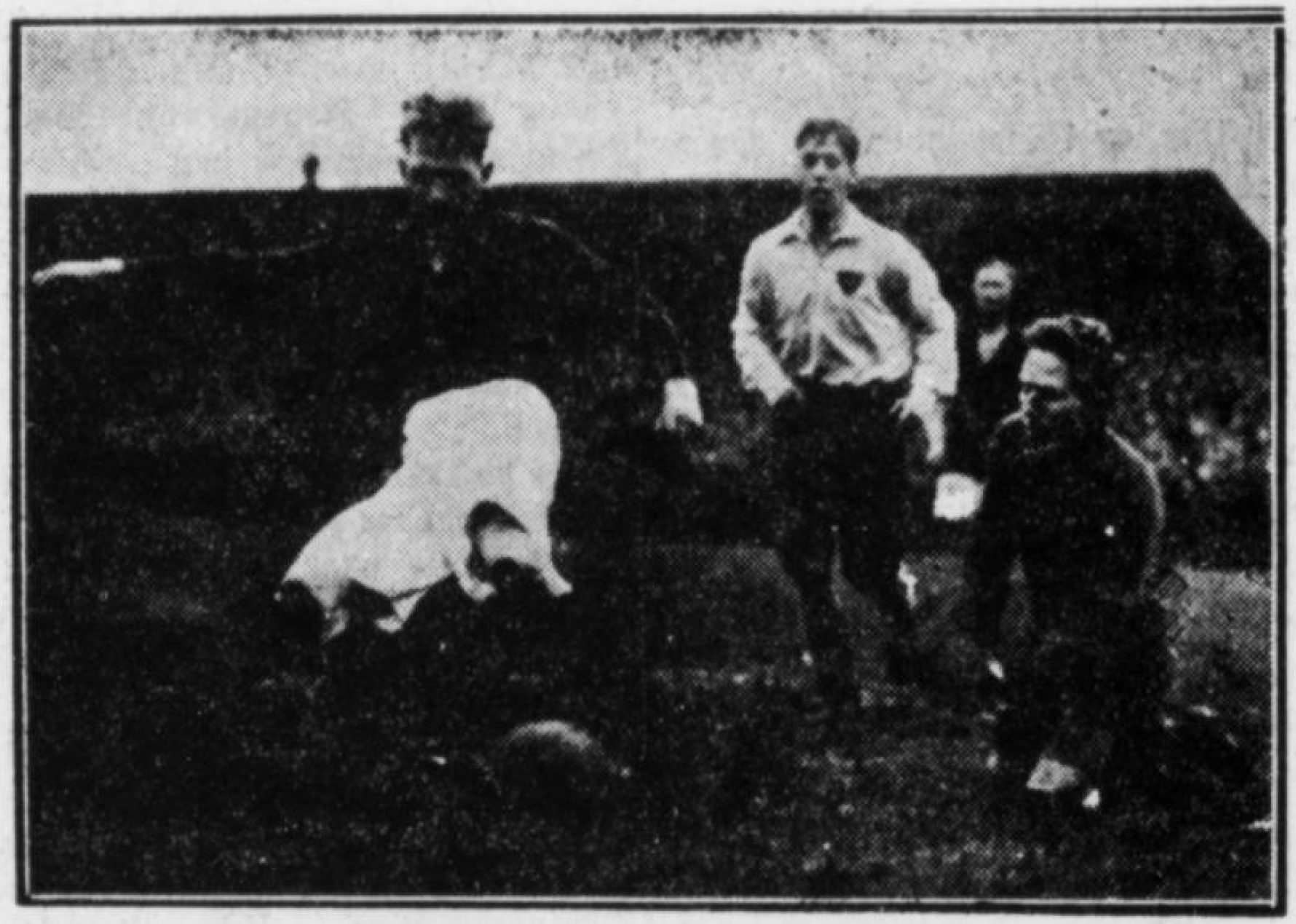
Match action during the 1927 KBUs Pokalturnering final — showing BK Frem's back Carl Johansen at work. Behind him, B.93's forward, Børge Mørch, with BK Frem's goalkeeper Niels Hansen on his knees.

The 1927 KBUs Pokalturnering (Unofficial English translation: 1927 KBU Cup, 1927 Copenhagen Cup) was the 18th edition of the regional tournament, KBUs Pokalturnering, the highest senior cup competition organised by the Copenhagen FA (KBU). The tournament was held in the fall of 1927 with B.93 as the defending cup champions. The season was launched on 28 August 1927 with the two matches featuring three of the lowest placed league teams from the previous season. BK Frem won the 1927 edition by defeating the previous season's cup champions, Østerbro-based B.93, 3–2 in the final after 3–0 lead halfway through the second half and an overall even match, played at Københavns Idrætspark on 6 November 1927, which was the BK Frem's second cup title in the tournament after seven appearances in the finals. The 8 participants in the tournament included the six members of the 1926–27 KBUs Mesterskabsrække and the two highest placed teams from the 1926–27 KBUs A-række.

The team line-up of Kjøbenhavns BK in the cup match against Akademisk BK consisted mostly of young and newly promoted senior players. The winners, Handelsstandens BK, of the 1926–27 KBUs A-række, the second-tier league under the Kjøbenhavns Boldspil-Union, managed to get past the first round by defeating the runners-up of the Copenhagen second highest league, Østerbros BK, before eventually being eliminated by B.93 in the second round.

The first round match between Østerbros BK and Handelsstandens BK at Københavns Idrætspark (Idrætsparkens Fodboldbane), for the first time in Danish football, featured the squad numbers 1–22 on white squares, which were placed high on the back of all the outfield players and on the chest of the goalkeepers — numbers 1–11 were carried by the players of Handelsstandens BK, while numbers 12–22 were carried by the Østerbros BK players. The reform experiment, receiving mixed reviews by the local newspapers, was meant as a service for the spectators nothing familiar with individual players, who were listed next to their numbers in the matchday programme. The Nationaltidende's journalist argued that the numbers were too hard to spot on the players located farthest away and wearing long-striped jerseys using multiple colours. The many double-digit numbers only made it harder to see, and 2 times 1–11 would suffice. The writer for Berlingske Tidende deemed the experiment a success, finding that the numbers were large and clear and easy to read, requesting that the idea be tried again in front of a larger audience. The usage of numbered player jerseys at an official Danish game took place shortly after the first attempt had been made at an unofficial preparation match in English football featured Chelsea F.C. players.

== Participants ==
Team	Qualification
B.93	Winners of the 1926–27 KBUs Mesterskabsrække
B 1903	Runners-up of the 1926–27 KBUs Mesterskabsrække
Akademisk BK	3rd place of the 1926–27 KBUs Mesterskabsrække
BK Frem	4th place of the 1926–27 KBUs Mesterskabsrække
Kjøbenhavns BK	5th place of the 1926–27 KBUs Mesterskabsrække
BK Fremad Amager	6th place of the 1926–27 KBUs Mesterskabsrække
Handelsstandens BK	Winners of the 1926–27 KBUs A-række
Østerbros BK	Runners-up of the 1926–27 KBUs A-række

== Matches ==
=== Bracket ===
Quarter-finals
4 September 1927
Akademisk BK	3
Kjøbenhavns BK	2
28 August 1927
BK Frem	4
BK Fremad Amager	3
28 August 1927
Østerbros BK	3
Handelsstandens BK	4
4 Sep and 10 Oct 1927
B.93	2	2
B 1903	2	0

Semi-finals
9 October 1927
Akademisk BK	3
BK Frem	5
23 October 1927
Handelsstandens BK	0
B.93	12

Cup Final
6 November 1927
B.93	2
BK Frem	3

=== Quarter-finals ===
4 September 1927
15:15 CET

Akademisk BK	3–2	Kjøbenhavns BK
Gabriel Ejrnæs 7', 9', 74'		Georg Taarup 10'; Oscar Jørgensen 17'

Københavns Idrætspark, Copenhagen
Attendance: 3,000
Referee: Lauritz Andersen

28 August 1927
15:15 CET

BK Frem	4–3	BK Fremad Amager
Henri Olsen 1'; Pauli Jørgensen 8', 50'; Carl Stoltz 75'		Knud Kastrup 68'; Orla Rasmussen 81', 85'

Københavns Idrætspark, Copenhagen
Attendance: 3,000
Referee: Vilhelm Jørgensen (B 1903)

28 August 1927
13:00 CET

Østerbros BK	3–4	Handelsstandens BK
Albert Neubert 43' (pen.); William Nicolaisen 47'; Ingvald Sørensen 64'		Henning Nielsen 15', 19'; Ejner Nielsen 17'; Ole Olsen 80'

Københavns Idrætspark, Copenhagen
Attendance: A few hundred
Referee: Poul Dreiøe (B.93)

4 September 1927
13:00 CET

B.93	2–2	B 1903
Michael Rohde 30'; Svend Petersen 68'		Henry Hansen 10'; Ernst Nilsson 21'

Københavns Idrætspark, Copenhagen
Attendance: 10,000
Referee: Otto Remke (Akademisk BK)
9 October 1927
15:15 CET
1st Replay

B.93	2–0	B 1903
Anthon Olsen 32'; Georg Hansen 78'

Københavns Idrætspark, Copenhagen
Attendance: 8,000
Referee: Lauritz Andersen

=== Semi-finals ===
9 October 1927
13:00 CET

Akademisk BK	3–5	BK Frem
Eyolf Kleven 35', 64'; Sigfred Jensen 52'		Pauli Jørgensen 22', 26', 73'; Kaj Uldaler 53'; Henri Olsen 59'

Københavns Idrætspark, Copenhagen
Attendance: 4,000
Referee: Peter Remtoft (Copenhagen)

23 October 1927
10:45 CET

Handelsstandens BK	0–12	B.93
		Georg Hansen 5', 58'; Michael Rohde 11', 25'; Børge Mørch 14', 20', 30', 37', 55'; Anthon Olsen 70', 87'; Kaj Plaugmann 83'

B.93's Bane at Øster Allé and St. James's Church, Østerbro
Attendance: 500
Referee: Valdemar Nilsson

=== Cup Final ===
==== Match summary ====
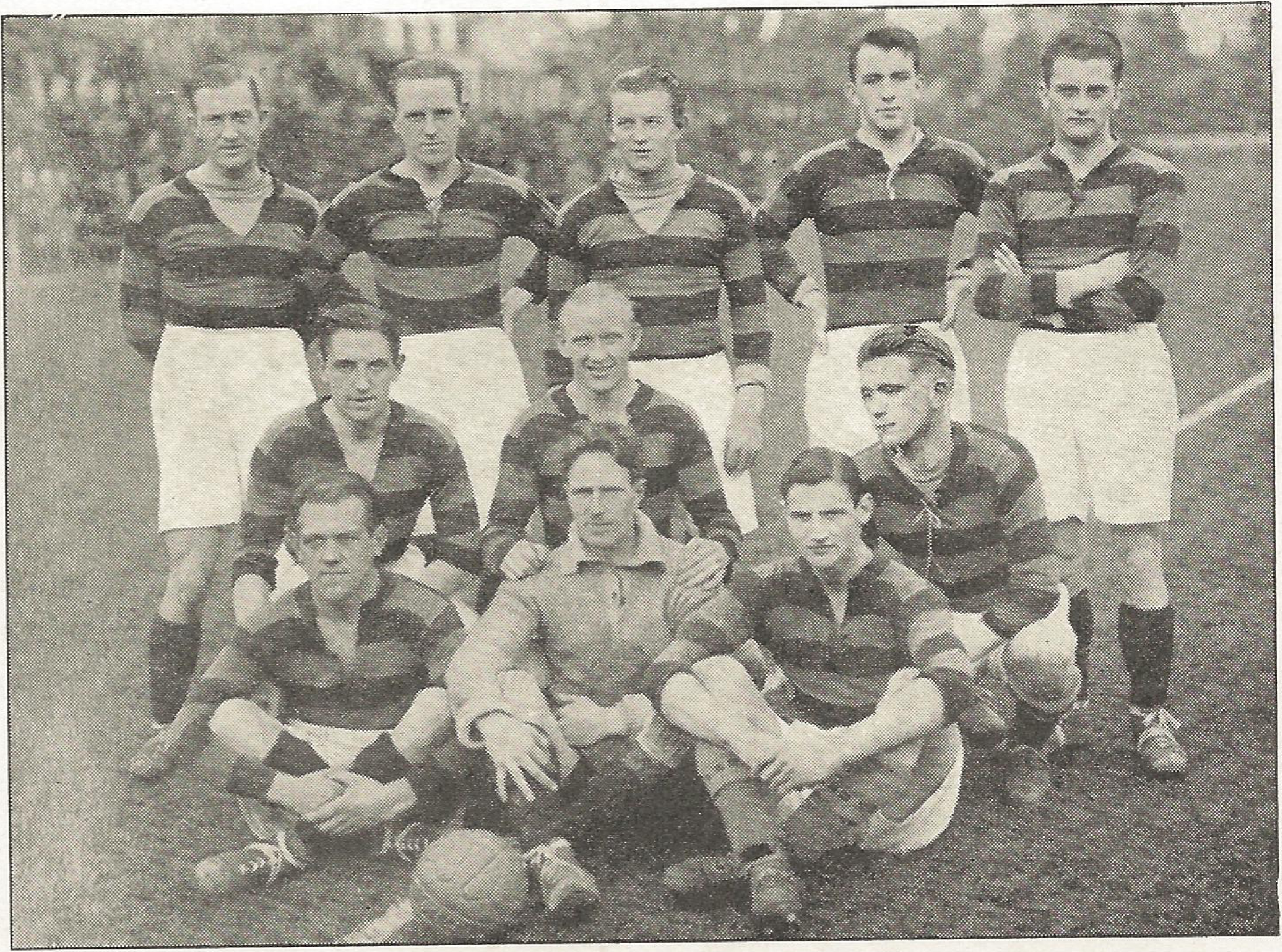
Winners of the KBUs Pokalturnering 1927 — regular team line-up of BK Frem: Standing: Robert Jensen, Svend Hansen, Pauli Jørgensen, Kaj Uldaler, Carl Stoltz. Kneeling: Kaj Esdal, Kay Madsen, Eiler Holm. Sitting: Carl Johansen, Niels Hansen, Knud Christophersen.

The match was refereed by Lauritz Andersen (previously affiliated with BK Velo), who had previously refereed two quarterfinal matches in this season's cup tournament and previous season's cup final. The final match was played at Københavns Idrætspark for the fifteenth time in the tournament's history, on 6 November 1927. The draw concerning the right to choose the starting half on the football field was won by BK Frem's captain Pauli Jørgensen, over the opposing team captain Fritz Tarp (B.93), selecting the goal facing the west side, towards Øster Allé — the choice did not play any significant role during the match as there were no considerable sunlight or wind. The field was reportedly very soft and during the first half, a short-lived breeze fell.

The match, which was delayed 5 minutes, started at a high pace. The first goal was conceived after only 5 minutes by BK Frem's Svend Hansen, when his shot from the right side of the field hit the right goal post projecting inside the net just next to the left goalpost, outside the reach of the 93's goalkeeper, Svend Jensen. The 1–0 lead energizes the BK Frem players, but several attempts do not materialise into an additional goal. After getting an accident with his knee in the 11th minute, BK Frem's Knud Christophersen have to temporarily leave the football field for three minutes to recover. B.93 gets the upper hand with many and the most dangerous attacks with goals prevented safely by the BK Frem goalkeeper, Niels Hansen, while BK Frem are sentenced to several fouls committed in this period. Unexpected, forward Carl Stoltz increase BK Frem's lead to 2–0 upon a powerful kick with him left foot towards the right goal post, placing a renewed pressure on the B.93 players.

The second half took place mostly on the BK Frem's half of the field, where the B.93 players struggled to void the lead made by BK Frem. After several B.93 attempts at the beginning of the second half, BK Frem gets an opportunity in the 63rd minute. BK Frem's forward Robert Jensen shots the ball over Svend Jensen's head, hitting the right goal post farthest away, and bouncing into the goal net near the left goal post, increasing the lead to 3–0 – almost identical to the first BK Frem goal made in the first half. B.93 decided to regroup, placing three of their players, Fritz Tarp as left innerwing, Børge Mørch as left half and Helge Scharff as right back, in positions, that they are not used to playing. B.93 is awarded a corner on the left side after an error committed by BK Frem's defender, Eiler Holm. The following corner kick ends up at Kaj Plaugmann, who makes one single move, and then shots the ball into the roof of the goal with his left foot, finally giving B.93 a goal in the match 4 minutes after BK Frem's last goal, reducing the overall score to 3–1. For the remaining part of the second half, there are almost continuous attacks by the B.93's players. With two minutes remaining of the match, B.93 gets their second and the last goal of an overall even match, once again made by Kaj Plaugmann.

BK Frem hence won the 1927 edition of the KBUs Pokalturnering, and were crowned Copenhagen Cup Champions (Danish: KBU pokalmestre), by defeating the previous season's cup champions, B.93, 3–2 in the final after 3–0 lead almost two-thirds into the match, which was the BK Frem's second championship in the tournament after seven appearances in the final. B.93's forward Børge Mørch and BK Frem's Pauli Jørgensen were highlighted as the best players on the field — though they did not score, they created the opportunities for their colleagues. The Valby-team players celebrated the win in the evening at the Centralbanehotellet situated on Halmtorvet.

==== Match details ====
6 November 1927
13:30 CET

B.93	2–3	BK Frem
Kaj Plaugmann 68', 88'		Svend Hansen 5'; Carl Stoltz 24'; Robert Jensen 63'

Københavns Idrætspark, Copenhagen
Attendance: 11,000
Referee: Lauritz Andersen

B.93	BK Frem

GK	Svend Jensen
DF	Fritz Tarp (c)
DF	Charles Jensen
MF	Poul Zølck
MF	Poul Jensen
MF	Helge Scharff
FW	Kaj Plaugmann
FW	Michael Rohde
FW	Børge Mørch
FW	Anthon Olsen
FW	Georg Hansen

GK	Niels Hansen
DF	Carl Johansen
DF	Knud Christophersen
MF	Eiler Holm
MF	Kay Madsen
MF	Kaj Esdal
FW	Robert Jensen
FW	Svend Hansen
FW	Pauli Jørgensen (c)
FW	Kaj Uldaler
FW	Carl Stoltz

Match rules

- 90 minutes.
- Replay match if scores still level after full-time.
- Two extra periods, of 15 minutes each, in use at replays.
- No substitutes.

== Statistics ==
=== Scoring ===
==== Top scorers ====
Rank	Player	Club	Goals
1	(Denmark) Børge Mørch	B.93	5
1	(Denmark) Pauli Jørgensen	BK Frem	5
3	(Denmark) Kaj Plaugmann	B.93	3
3	(Denmark) Anthon Olsen	B.93	3
3	(Denmark) Georg Hansen	B.93	3
3	(Denmark) Michael Rohde	B.93	3
3	(Denmark) Gabriel Ejrnæs	Akademisk BK	3
8	(Denmark) Carl Stoltz	BK Frem	2
8	(Denmark) Henri Olsen	BK Frem	2
8	(Denmark) Eyolf Kleven	Akademisk BK	2
8	(Denmark) Orla Rasmussen	BK Fremad Amager	2
8	(Denmark) Henning Nielsen	Handelsstandens BK	2

==== Hat-tricks ====
Player	For	Against	Result	Date	Ref
(Denmark) Gabriel Ejrnæs	Akademisk BK	Kjøbenhavns BK	3–2 (N)	4 September 1927	
(Denmark) Pauli Jørgensen	BK Frem	Akademisk BK	5–3 (N)	9 October 1927	
(Denmark) Børge Mørch^{5}	B.93	Handelsstandens BK	12–0 (N)	23 October 1927	

- ^{5} Player scored 5 goals

=== Clean sheets ===
Rank	Player	Club	Clean sheets	Ref
1	(Denmark) Svend Jensen	B.93	2	
