= 1926 KBUs Pokalturnering =

1926 KBU Cup

Tournament details
- Country: Denmark
- Venue(s): Københavns Idrætspark, Copenhagen
- Dates: 22 August – 7 November 1926
- Teams: 8

Final positions
- Champions: B.93 (5th title)
- Runners-up: Kjøbenhavns BK

Tournament statistics
- Matches played: 10
- Goals scored: 52 (5.2 per match)
- Top goal scorer: Poul "Tist" Nielsen (8 goals)
- Total matches and goals scored include replays

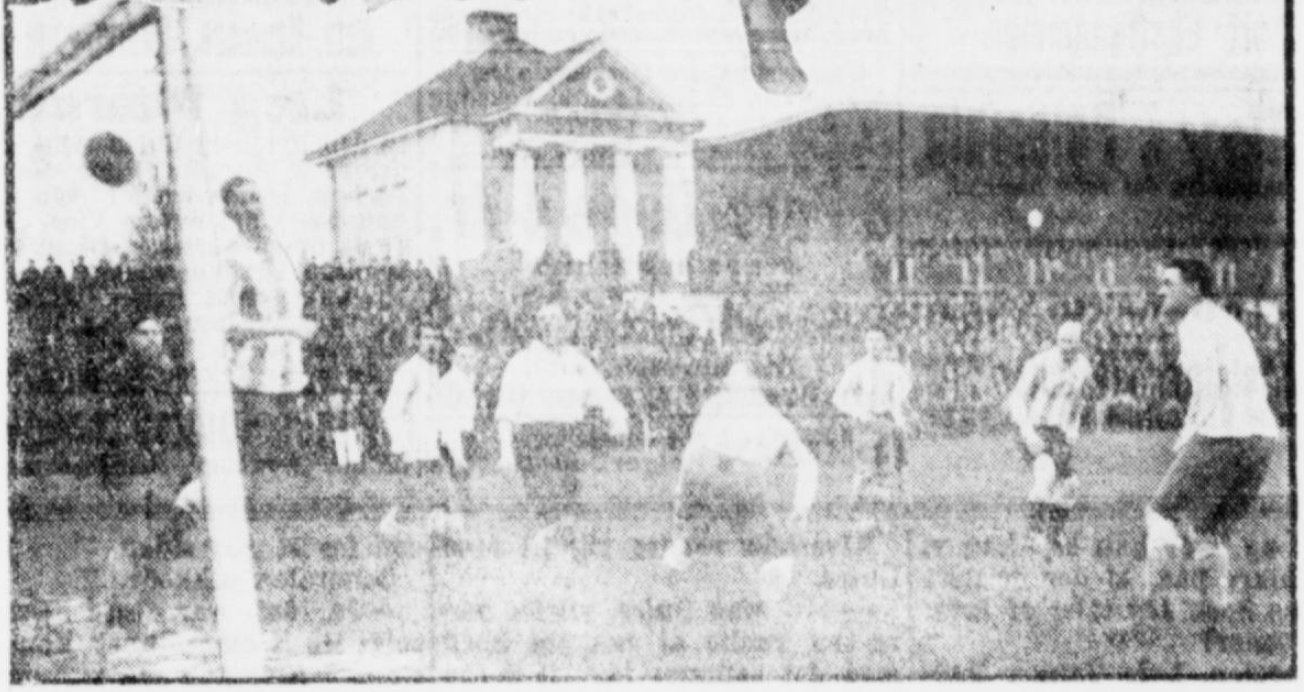
Match action during the final of the 1926 KBUs Pokalturnering — showing B.93's second goal being scored directly by Anthon Olsen following a free kick, with Kjøbenhavns BK's defender Valdemar Laursen trying to reach the ball with his head.

The 1926 KBUs Pokalturnering (Unofficial English translation: 1926 KBU Cup, 1926 Copenhagen Cup) was the 17th edition of the regional tournament, KBUs Pokalturnering, the highest senior cup competition organised by the Copenhagen FA (KBU). The tournament was held in the fall of 1926 with BK Frem, then based on Enghavevej, as the defending cup champions. The season was launched with one match on 22 August 1926 between the last season's runners-up in Copenhagen Football League B.93 and the newly promoted league club BK Fremad Amager. This season's installment was won by B.93 after defeating Kjøbenhavns BK 5–1 in the final played at Københavns Idrætspark on 7 November 1926, which was the club's fifth cup title after having contested in eight finals of the tournament. The 8 participants in the tournament included the six members of the 1925–26 KBUs Mesterskabsrække and the two highest placed teams from the 1925–26 KBUs A-række.

The runners-up of the 1925–26 KBUs A-række, the second-tier league under the Kjøbenhavns Boldspil-Union, managed to reach the second round by defeating Akademisk BK from the regional top-tier Copenhagen Football League, before eventually being eliminated by Østerbro-based B.93. In the very first round, the two KBUs Mesterskabsrække clubs of B 1903 and BK Frem had to play two additional matches over the course of 5 weeks time before a winner could be found, that would go through to the semi-finals. KFUMs BK and Kjøbenhavns BK played one extra quarterfinal game to determine which club would participate in the semi-finals. The extra matches would generate an additional income of DKK 5–6,000 to both clubs. Forward Poul "Tist" Nielsen of Kjøbenhavns BK became the tournament's top goal scorer with 8 goals, which he scored during the course of the club's four cup matches.

== Participants ==
Team	Qualification
B 1903	Winners of the 1925–26 KBUs Mesterskabsrække
B.93	Runners-up of the 1925–26 KBUs Mesterskabsrække
BK Frem	3rd place of the 1925–26 KBUs Mesterskabsrække
Akademisk BK	4th place of the 1925–26 KBUs Mesterskabsrække
Kjøbenhavns BK	5th place of the 1925–26 KBUs Mesterskabsrække
KFUMs BK	6th place of the 1925–26 KBUs Mesterskabsrække
BK Fremad Amager	Winners of the 1925–26 KBUs A-række
Østerbros BK	Runners-up of the 1925–26 KBUs A-række

== Matches ==
=== Bracket ===
Quarter-finals
22 August 1926
BK Fremad Amager	1
B.93	3
5 September 1926
Akademisk BK	0
Østerbros BK	1
5 Sep, 26 Sep and 10 Oct 1926
B 1903	0	3	0
BK Frem	0	3	2
5 Sep and 26 Sep 1926
KFUMs BK	3	0
Kjøbenhavns BK	3	9

Semi-finals
17 October 1926
B.93	10
Østerbros BK	1
17 October 1926
BK Frem	3
Kjøbenhavns BK	4

Cup Final
7 November 1926
B.93	5
Kjøbenhavns BK	1

=== Quarter-finals ===
22 August 1926
13:00 CET

BK Fremad Amager	1–3	B.93
Valdemar Henriksen 89'		Georg Hansen 18'; Magnus Simonsen 30'; Fritz Tarp 66' (pen.)

Københavns Idrætspark, Copenhagen
Attendance: 2,000
Referee: Lauritz Andersen (BK Velo)

5 September 1926
12:00 CET

B 1903	0–0	BK Frem

Københavns Idrætspark, Copenhagen
Attendance: 4,000
Referee: Lauritz Andersen (BK Velo)
26 September 1926
13:00 CET
1st Replay

B 1903	3–3	BK Frem
Ernst Nilsson 44'; Viggo Jørgensen 55'; Fridtjof Steen 58' (pen.)		Kaj Uldaler 37'; Carl Stoltz 41'; Eiler Holm 66' (pen.)

Københavns Idrætspark, Copenhagen
Attendance: 10,000
Referee: Einer Ulrich (Akademisk BK)
10 October 1926
13:00 CET
2nd Replay

B 1903	0–2	BK Frem
		Carl Stoltz 44'; Keld Gall 55'

Københavns Idrætspark, Copenhagen
Attendance: 3,000
Referee: Otto Remke (Akademisk BK)

5 September 1926
14:15 CET

Akademisk BK	0–1	Østerbros BK
		Wichmann 1'

Københavns Idrætspark, Copenhagen
Attendance: 1,250
Referee: Vilhelm Jørgensen (B 1903)

5 September 1926
16:30 CET

KFUMs BK	3–3 (Note: The first match between KFUMs BK and Kjøbenhavns BK on 5 September 1926 ended in a 3–3 tie. KFUMs BK's second goal in the second half, made via a header following a corner kick, was scored after the referee had already interrupted the game by whistling for a penalty kick awarded to KFUMs BK. The referee approved the goal and the penalty kick was hence not executed. However, the Copenhagen FA did not recognise this goal and the competition's committee scheduled for a new cup match to be played on 26 September 1926 on that reasoning instead of the original game being tied.)	Kjøbenhavns BK
Alex Schrøder 20'; Børge Walsøe 60'; Sniðlvur Jacobsen 87'		Poul "Tist" Nielsen 5'; E. Axholt 31'; Aage Hans Peter Jørgensen 85'

Københavns Idrætspark, Copenhagen
Attendance: Few hundred
Referee: Poul Dreiøe (B.93)
26 September 1926
15:15 CET
1st Replay

KFUMs BK	0–9	Kjøbenhavns BK
		Poul "Tist" Nielsen 21', 33', 44', 67', 75'; Steen Steensen Blicher 41' (pen.); E. Axholt 63'; Harald Lindemann 72'; Erik Eriksen 78'

Københavns Idrætspark, Copenhagen
Attendance: Many thousands
Referee: Valdemar Nilsson

=== Semi-finals ===
17 October 1926
13:00 CET

BK Frem	3–4	Kjøbenhavns BK
Pauli Jørgensen 34'; Svend Hansen 59'; Børge Mørch 83'		Poul "Tist" Nielsen 2', 66'; Erik Eriksen 15'; Harald Lindemann 38'

Københavns Idrætspark, Copenhagen
Attendance: 7,000
Referee: Otto Remke (Akademisk BK)

17 October 1926
15:15 CET

B.93	10–1	Østerbros BK
Magnus Simonsen 11', 35'; Michael Rohde 18', 66', 71', 86'; Svend Petersen 54', 80'; Anthon Olsen 58', 65'		Axel Baunhøj 68'

Københavns Idrætspark, Copenhagen
Attendance: 3,000
Referee: Vilhelm Jørgensen (B 1903)

=== Cup Final ===
==== Match summary ====
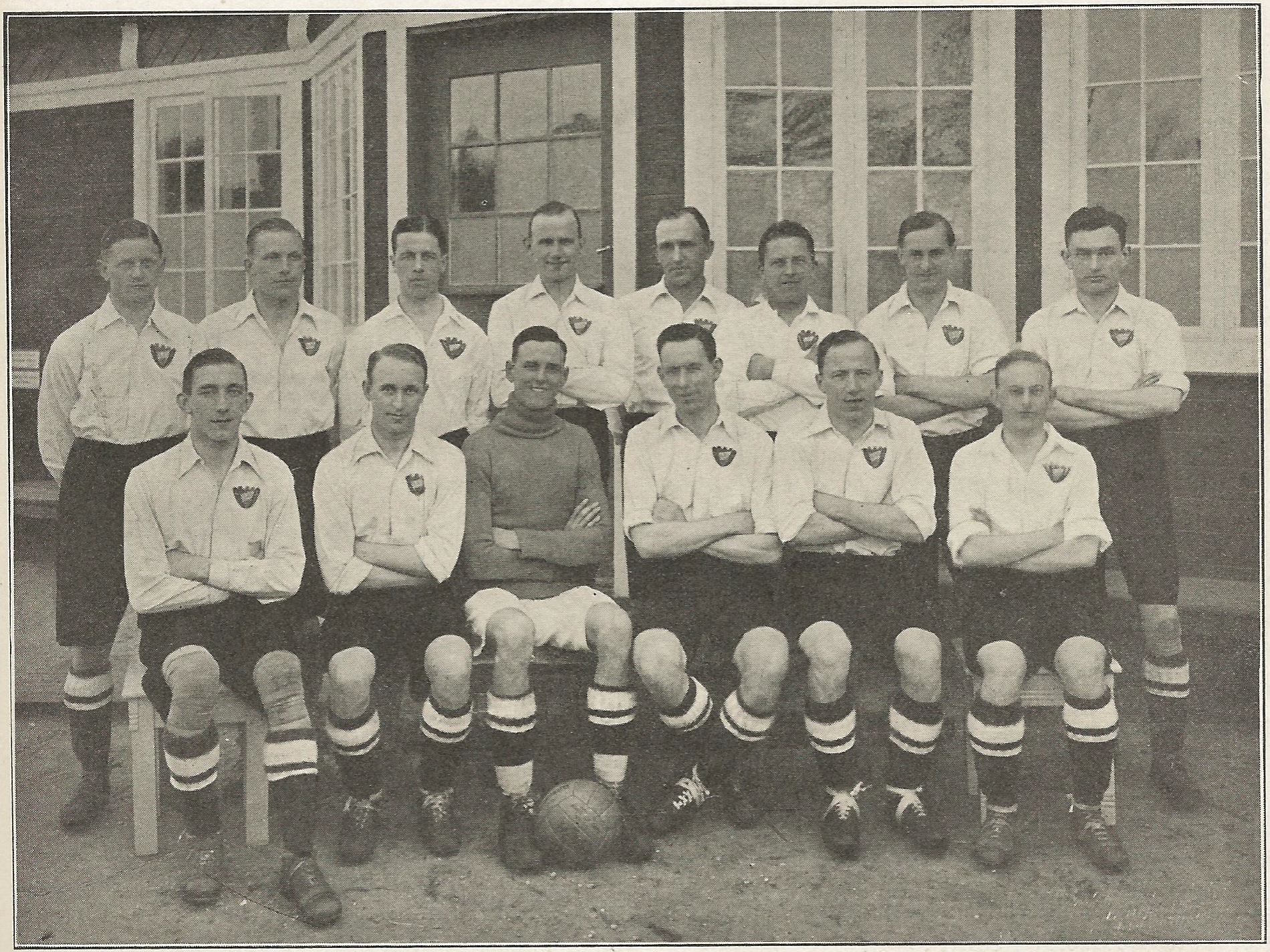
Winners of the KBUs Pokalturnering 1926 edition — regular team line-up of B.93 including reserves: Standing: Poul Offenbach, Svend Petersen, William Gram, Georg Hansen, Anthon Olsen, Michael Rohde, Magnus Simonsen, Helge Scharff. Kneeling: Poul Zølck, Fritz Tarp, Svend Jensen, Charles Jensen, Poul Jensen, Leo Hansen. Missing footballer: Knud Andersen.

Københavns Idrætspark acted as the host stadium on 7 November 1926 for the fourteenth time in the history of KBUs Pokalturnering. The weather at the game was sunny and relatively less windy, but with a wet and greasy surface due to the great rain shower in the morning and the previous night. This required high studs under the players' football boots for stability, which not all players had. Kjøbenhavns Boldklub's football kit consisted of blue-white shirts during the match, while the B.93 players had all white shirts. The final match was a repetition of the 1910 and 1916 cup finals, who had previously meet against each other a total of six times in the competition's history. Based on the team's recent league results, B.93 were regarded as favorites to win the cup title by various newspapers. The previous weekend, on 31 October 1926, the two teams had also met each other in the league resulting in a 3–1 win to B.93.

The match was refereed by Lauritz Andersen (affiliated with BK Velo) together with two of KBU's most used referees at that time, Valdemar Nilsson and Poul Jørgensen, as the linesmen featured in yellow shirts. The draw at the beginning of the match concerning the right to choose the starting half of the football field was won by Kjøbenhavns BK's captain Poul "Tist" Nielsen, who choose the goal facing the western side of the stadium, towards Øster Allé, which meant the KB players would start the game with the sun and wind in their backs. B.93 fielded the exact same team line-up, that they had used in their previous match the previous Sunday, while Kjøbenhavns BK fielded three relatively new players in the squad, namely the newly promoted youth players Harald Lindemann, Holger "Dirk" Asmussen and Poul Hansen (as replacement for forward Erik Eriksen) — the last one having played youth matches the previous season and reserve team matches in the fall of 1926. Poul Hansen, placed as left innerwing, would get his debut on KB's first team in this match. Poul "Tist" Nielsen, the captain of Kjøbenhavns BK, was the only player on the field having also participated in the 1910 final, while Anthon Olsen of B.93 was the oldest player on the field being 37 years old.

The match started on time, 13:30 CET, with the referee emerging from the changing room in the basement of the stadium as the last one on the field, and the first several minutes began at a nervous, sluggish pace. The Østerbro-based team had the first dangerous attack in the match, which resulted in Michael Rohde getting a hard ball in his face, and the referee Lauritz Andersen having to halt the play for a small minute, and the club's masseuse Marx treating him. Shortly hereafter, in the 9th minute, B.93 forward Magnus Simonsen outplayed Kjøbenhavns BK defenders Aage Jørgensen and Steen Steensen Blicher, before passing the ball to Svend Petersen, who did not hesitate placing the ball resolute and hard in the right corner of the goal outside the reach of goalkeeper Poul Graae. The goal energized the players, who began playing in a much larger pace. Kjøbenhavn BK attempted a few fruitless attacks against B.93's defense and goal, but the ball was primarily kept on KB's side with one attempt from B.93's forward Anthon Olsen hitting the upper goalpost before returning in play. A few minutes after, the referee called a foul on K.B.'s Steen Steensen Blicher using his arm improperly against Michael Rohde, and awarded B.93 a free kick 3 meters outside the penalty area. Anthon Olsen executed the free kick, scoring directly in the right side of the goal, giving B.93 a 2–0 lead approximately halfway through the first half, above the reach of defender Valdemar Laursen standing at the goal line. This was followed by the KB players' best period in the match, which consisted of a series of attacks, one of which resulted in the referee awarding the team a penalty kick. B.93's goalkeeper Svend Jensen had unnecessarily driven his albow into the chin of the opponent's left inner wing Poul Hansen following Poul Hansen's attempt at heading the ball out of the keeper's hands. Steen Steensen Blicher scored from the penalty spot. A new free kick to B.93 was executed by Anthon Olsen, passing the ball to Michael Rohde, who scored his first goal of the match with only a few minutes missing of the first half. The opening half ended with a 3–1 lead to B.93.

The low-lying sunrays were pointing the Kjøbenhavns Boldklub players directly in their faces in the second half, when their own goal was now located on the eastern side next to a hockey field. Kjøbenhavns BK players started with a period of superiority at the beginning of the second half, which however did not result in any goals. B.93 overtook that game advantage and kept it for the remaining part of the match, with K.B. only being allowed to play on their own terms momentarily. After circa 20 minutes of play in the second half, B.93's forward Michael Rohde received the ball from the right side of the field, outplayed defender Valdemar Laursen of K.B., and starting going towards the goal hard pressed by four opponents, and eventually placing the goal in the net behind Kjøbenhavns BK's goalkeeper Poul Graae. Poul Graae was engaged in a lot of activities in front of his goal in the last part of the second half. Only one minute before the final whistle, B.93's Anthon Olsen attempted a shot against KB's Poul Graae, who only managed to push the ball to the right side. Svend Petersen was standing on that specific side of the goal, ready to make a pass to Michael Rohde, who scored another goal, obtaining a hattrick in the game, giving B.93 a solid 5–1 lead and ending the cup final shortly hereafter. The only direct goal attempt by KB was made by Vilhelm Nielsen at the end of the match.

B.93 won the final of the KBUs Pokalturnering and was crowned Copenhagen Cup Champions (Danish: KBU pokalmestre) by the representatives of the local football organisation, Copenhagen FA (KBU), and acquiring their first lot (of five) in their efforts of being able to keep the trophy permanently. Newspapers Berlingske Tidende, Fyens Stiftstidende and Dagbladet graded Fritz Tarp, Michael Rohde and Anthon Olsen as the winning team's best players during the final. The finale had an attendance of approximately 13,000 spectators.

==== Match details ====
7 November 1926
13:30 CET

B.93	5–1	Kjøbenhavns BK
Svend Petersen 9'; Anthon Olsen 23'; Michael Rohde 42', 65', 89'		Steen Steensen Blicher 37' (pen.)

Københavns Idrætspark, Copenhagen
Attendance: 13,000
Referee: Lauritz Andersen (BK Velo)

B.93	Kjøbenhavns BK

GK	(Denmark) Svend Jensen
DF	(Denmark) Charles Jensen
DF	(Denmark) Fritz Tarp (c)
MF	(Denmark) Helge Scharff
MF	(Denmark) Poul Jensen
MF	(Denmark) Poul Zølck
FW	(Denmark) Georg Hansen
FW	(Denmark) Anthon Olsen
FW	(Denmark) Michael Rohde
FW	(Denmark) Magnus Simonsen
FW	(Denmark) Svend Petersen

Assistant referees/linesmen

- Valdemar Nilsson
- Poul Jørgensen

GK	(Denmark) Poul Graae
DF	(Denmark) Steen Steensen Blicher
DF	(Denmark) Valdemar Laursen
MF	(Denmark) Aage Hans Peter Jørgensen
MF	(Denmark) Carl A. Jensen
MF	(Denmark) Vilhelm Nielsen
FW	(Denmark) Svend Aage Remtoft
FW	(Denmark) Poul Hansen
FW	(Denmark) Poul "Tist" Nielsen (c)
FW	(Denmark) Holger "Dirk" Asmussen
FW	(Denmark) Harald Lindemann

Match rules

- 90 minutes.
- Replay match if scores still level after full-time.
- Two extra periods, of 15 minutes each, in use at replays.
- No substitutes.

== Statistics ==
=== Scoring ===
==== Top scorers ====
Rank	Player	Club	Goals
1	(Denmark) Poul "Tist" Nielsen	Kjøbenhavns BK	8
2	(Denmark) Michael Rohde	B.93	7
3	(Denmark) Svend Petersen	B.93	3
3	(Denmark) Magnus Simonsen	B.93	3
3	(Denmark) Anthon Olsen	B.93	3
6	(Denmark) Steen Steensen Blicher	Kjøbenhavns BK	2
6	(Denmark) Harald Lindemann	Kjøbenhavns BK	2
6	(Denmark) Carl Stoltz	BK Frem	2
6	(Denmark) E. Axholt	Kjøbenhavns BK	2

==== Hat-tricks ====
Player	For	Against	Result	Date	Ref
(Denmark) Poul "Tist" Nielsen^{5}	Kjøbenhavns BK	KFUMs BK	0–9 (N)	26 September 1926	
(Denmark) Michael Rohde^{4}	B.93	Østerbros BK	10–1 (N)	17 October 1926	
(Denmark) Michael Rohde	B.93	Kjøbenhavns BK	5–1 (N)	7 November 1926	

- ^{5} Player scored 5 goals
- ^{4} Player scored 4 goals

=== Clean sheets ===
Rank	Player	Club	Clean sheets	Ref
1	(Denmark) Niels Hansen	BK Frem	2	
2	(Denmark) Poul Christiansen	B 1903	1	
2	(Denmark) Otto Nielsen	Østerbros BK	1	
2	(Denmark) Ole Work	Kjøbenhavns BK	1	
