= Egon Sørensen =

Danish football manager and former goalkeeper (1913 - 1981)

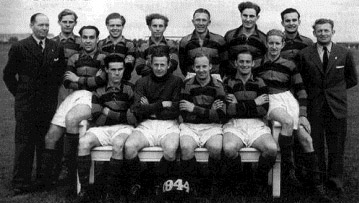
- Egon Sørensen in 1944 (seen sitting, third from the left)

Personal information
- Full name: Egon Sørensen
- Date of birth: 16 February 1913
- Place of birth: Copenhagen, Denmark
- Date of death: 25 October 1981 (aged 68)
- Position: Goalkeeper

Youth career
- Boldklubben Frem

Senior career*
Years	Team	Apps	(Gls)
1935–1947	Boldklubben Frem	237	(0)
- Ajax København (handball)

International career
1935–1945	Denmark	18	(0)
- Denmark (handball)

Managerial career
- Kolding IF
- Hjørring IF
- Roskilde
- 1959: Køge BK
- * Club domestic league appearances and goals

Egon Sørensen (16 February 1913 – 25 October 1981) was a Danish amateur football goalkeeper and club manager, who played 18 games for the Denmark national football team. Due to World War II, 6 of his last 9 internationals were matches against Sweden. Sørensen spent his entire club career with BK Frem, playing 237 matches for the club.

Egon Sørensen was a physically strong goalkeeper, able to play as an outfield player. At Frem, he was well trained by the shots of international centre forward Pauli Jørgensen, who later became team coach. Sørensen made his debut for the Danish national team in 1935, and competed with Aksel Daniel Nielsen and Ove Jensen to replace international veteran Svend Jensen. They were all eventually eclipsed by Eigil Nielsen.

Sørensen was also a dedicated handballer, and represented the Denmark men's national handball team at the 1938 World Men's Handball Championship. He worked as a boots and shoes dealer.

== Honours ==
- Danish Football Championships: 1935–36, 1940–41 and 1943–44 with Frem
