= Sofus Johansen =

Danish footballer (1900–1974)

Personal information
- Full name: Sofus Aksel Johansen
- Date of birth: 1 November 1900
- Place of birth: Copenhagen, Denmark
- Date of death: 17 May 1974 (aged 73)
- Place of death: Hvidovre, Denmark
- Position: Wing-half

Senior career*
Years	Team	Apps	(Gls)
- Borup IF
1923–1931	Frem	94	(20)

International career
1925–1931	Denmark	8	(0)

Managerial career
- 1934–1935: Hvidovre
- 1940–1943: Frem
- 1943–1945: Køge Boldklub
- * Club domestic league appearances and goals

Sofus Johansen (1 November 1900 – 17 May 1974) was a Danish football player and manager. He played in eight matches for the Denmark national football team from 1925 to 1931.

== Playing career ==
After starting his career for Borup IF, he moved to Frem in 1923. He scored 20 goals in 94 appearances for the club during his eight years at the club, helping the club win the 1930–31 Danish Championship League. He also gained eight caps for the Denmark national team between 1925 and 1931.

== Managerial career ==
In 1934, Johansen was appointed head coach of Hvidovre IF, who had recently become affiliated to the Kjøbenhavns Boldspil-Union (KBU). Between 1940 and 1943, he managed Frem, leading them to the Danish league title in the 1940–41 season. He would later coach Køge Boldklub between 1943 and 1945.

== After football ==
Besides his football career, Johansen worked as a bricklayer. In 1932, he starred as "Danish national team player", a role in Per-Axel Branner's film His Life's Match.

Johansen started boxing to maintain his fitness during the winter season, and later became so skilled that he had numerous matches and eventually became a competitive boxer.

== Honours ==
=== Player ===
Frem

- Danish 1st Division: 1931
- KBUs Pokalturnering: 1925, 1927

=== Manager ===
Frem

- Danish War Tournament: 1940–41
