= Hans Colberg =

Danish footballer (1921–2007)

Personal information
- Full name: Hans Christian Colberg
- Date of birth: 14 December 1921
- Place of birth: Klemensker, Bornholm, Denmark
- Date of death: 25 September 2007 (aged 85)
- Positions: Full back; half-back

Youth career
- Hasle
- 1939–1940: Lillerød

Senior career*
| Years | Team | Apps | (Gls) |
| 1942–1950 | Boldklubben Frem | 151 | (8) |
| 1950–1953 | Lucchese | 68 | (1) |

International career
| 1946–1948 | Denmark U23 | 3 | (0) |
| 1948–1950 | Denmark | 4 | (0) |
- * Club domestic league appearances and goals

Medal record

Men's football

Representing Denmark

Olympic Games
| Bronze medal – third place | 1948 London | Team competition |

Hans Christian Colberg (14 December 1921 – 25 September 2007) was a Danish football player. He played as an amateur for BK Frem, winning the 1944 Danish championship, before moving abroad to play professionally for Italian club Lucchese Lucca. He played four games for the Denmark national football team, and was an unused substitute in the team that won bronze medals at the 1948 Summer Olympics. Colberg was the first player from Bornholm to play in the national team.

Colberg was a constructive player with great stamina, but during his time in Denmark, he was most often played out of his natural position of right half-back. In the Frem team, he was overshadowed by Walther Christensen, and in the national team, Axel Pilmark was preferred. So Colberg settled into the defensive position of full back. In 1948, Colberg got his debut for the Danish national team, but he was only used sparingly. He played four international games, before he signed a professional contract and was excluded from the amateur-only national team. Hans Colberg signed for Lucchese Lucca in the Italian Serie A.Here, he came to his right as a creative playmaker in the half-back position. Colberg played three seasons in Lucchese, including the last season in the secondary Serie B division, before ending his career in 1953.

== Honours ==
- Danish Championship: 1943–44 with Frem

Denmark

- Olympic Bronze Medal: 1948
