= Ove Jensen =

Danish footballer (1919–2011)

Personal information
- Date of birth: 7 November 1919
- Place of birth: Copenhagen, Denmark
- Date of death: 22 April 2011 (aged 91)
- Place of death: Hellerup, Denmark
- Position: Goalkeeper

Senior career*
Years	Team	Apps	(Gls)
1942–1957	B.93		

International career
1945	Denmark U21	1	(0)
1945–1948	Denmark	12	(0)
Medal record
Men's football
Representing Denmark
Olympic Games
Bronze medal – third place	1948 London	Team
- * Club domestic league appearances and goals

Ove Jensen (7 November 1919 – 22 April 2011) was a Danish amateur footballer, who played 12 games for the Denmark national football team and was an unused substitute as Denmark won bronze medals at the 1948 Summer Olympics. He was a quick and elegant goalkeeper, who modeled his game on legendary Danish international goalkeeper Svend Jensen. He played his club football with B.93, and made his international debut in 1945. He competed for the Danish goalkeeper spot with Egon Sørensen and Eigil Nielsen. In 1947, Jensen was selected for the Europe XI team, but was an unused substitute as the team lost 1-6 to the Great Britain national football team at Hampden Park. Jensen played 12 international games until 1948, when he was eclipsed by Eigil Nielsen.

== Honours ==
Denmark

- Olympic Bronze Medal: 1948
