= Walther Christensen =

Danish footballer

Personal information
- Full name: John Walther Christensen
- Date of birth: September 23, 1918
- Place of birth: Copenhagen, Denmark
- Date of death: December 1, 1965 (aged 47)
- Place of death: Copenhagen, Denmark
- Position: Midfielder

Youth career
- Boldklubben Frem

Senior career*
Years	Team	Apps	(Gls)
1937–1947	Boldklubben Frem	139	(23)

International career
1939–1942	Denmark	10	(1)
- * Club domestic league appearances and goals

John Walther Christensen (September 23, 1918 – December 1, 1965) was a Danish amateur footballer who played as a midfielder. He made 10 appearances and scored one goal for the Denmark national football team. Christensen spent his entire club career with Boldklubben Frem, with whom he won the Danish championship in 1941 and 1944. Christensen was described as one of the greatest Danish football talents of all time, and was a well-balanced player who possessed a fine overview and performed delicate passes.

== Biography ==
Born in Copenhagen, Christensen started playing club football for local club Boldklubben Frem in the amateur-only Danish championship, making his senior debut in August 1937. In 1939, the Danish Football Association asked professional coach Edward Magner to coach the Denmark national football team. Christensen was among the 53 players selected for training sessions with Magner, but was excluded from one training session due to his lax attitude. Nevertheless, Christensen made his debut for the Danish national team under Magner in June 1939, as he scored a goal in a 6–3 victory against Norway. He played an additional six national team matches against Sweden and three against Germany; 10 international games in total. His last national team game was in October 1942.

Christensen did deliver the odd bad performance, and was even sent off by Frem team captain Pauli Jørgensen during a game in May 1941 for not working hard enough. Off the field, Christensen was known to be a bit too fond of alcoholic beverages, and his game began to suffer from bad form and lack of speed though his passing skills and technique were still making him an important part of the Frem team. In his time at Frem, Christensen helped the club win the 1940–41 and 1943–44 Danish championships. He played a total 139 games and scored 23 goals for Frem, before ending his career in November 1947, 29 years old.

In his civil life, Christensen worked as an upholsterer and saddler. Christensen was a part of the Danish resistance movement during the German occupation of Denmark under World War II, and towards the end of war he was imprisoned in the Frøslev Prison Camp.

== Honours ==
Frem

- Danish Championships: 1940–41 and 1943–44
