= Ivar Lykke (footballer) =

Danish footballer (1889–1955)

Medal record

Men's Football

Representing Denmark

Olympic Games
Silver medal – second place	1912 Stockholm	Team competition

Ivar-Lykke Seidelin-Nielsen (7 March 1889 – 9 January 1955), known as Ivar Lykke for short, was a Danish amateur football (soccer) player, who played as a defender. He played 27 games for the Denmark national football team, and competed in the 1912 Summer Olympics, winning a silver medal, as well as in the 1920 Summer Olympics.

He played his entire career for Copenhagen club KB, with whom he won several Danish football championships. He made his Danish national team debut in October 1911, and was a part of the Danish squad for the 1912 Summer Olympics. He played one game at the tournament, in which Denmark won silver medals. From June 1917, he was named Danish national team captain, and he captained the national team in 12 games. He played his last national team game at the 1920 Summer Olympics, where Denmark was eliminated in the first round by Spain.
