= Select Sport =

Danish manufacturing company of sportswear

- Type: Private
- Industry: Sports equipment
- Founded: 1947; 79 years ago
- Founder: Eigil Nielsen
- Headquarters: Glostrup, Copenhagen, Denmark
- Key people: Peter Knap (CEO), Preben Kønig (Chairman)
- Products: Balls, sportswear, Protective gear
- Website: select-sport.com

Select Sport A.S. is a Danish sports equipment manufacturer based in Glostrup, Denmark.

As of 2008, Select Sport provides the Danish Football Association with footballs, and also several clubs in the Danish, Belgian, and Portuguese top football leagues use Select balls.

Select also provides the Official Matchball for the Germany Bundesliga and Bundesliga 2 with Derbystar form 2018/19 season

Select balls are used in the Olympic handball games, as well as in the World Championship and in the Danish, Swedish and Spanish men's handball leagues, among others.

The company's U.S. subsidiary, Select Sport America, has contracts to supply soccer balls for the United Soccer League, National Premier Soccer League, NAIA, several NCAA Division II and Division III conferences, and state high school federations in Kentucky and Wisconsin.

== History ==
It was founded in 1947 by Eigil Nielsen, the former goalkeeper of the Denmark national team.

In 1962, Select manufactured and marketed the first 32-panel ball. Based loosely on the geodesic dome designs of R. Buckminster Fuller, it consisted of 12 black pentagons and 20 white hexagons. The 32 panel configuration became the world standard for several decades. Select was also the first manufacturer of footballs without exterior lacing.

== Products ==
Select Sport manufactures and commercializes a variety of products for several sports. The following chart contains all the product lines by the company.

Sport	Range of products
Association football	Balls, uniforms, goalkeeper gloves
Futsal	Balls, uniforms, goalkeeper gloves,
Handball	Balls, sportswear
Accessories	Shoes, shin guards, compression garment, pressure measurements, ball pumps, bags, tactic boards, inflatable figures, marking cones, ointments, ice packs, massage balls, medical bags

== Sponsorships ==
Select Sport is the official supplier and sponsor of numerous teams, players and associations of several sports, including:

=== Football ===
==== National teams ====
- (Schleswig-Holstein) Southern Schleswig

==== Associations and competitions ====
Select is official ball supplier for the following football leagues/associations:

- (Belgium) Jupiler Pro League
- (Bosnia and Herzegovina) BH Telecom Premier League
- Danish Football Association
  - ALKA Superliga
  - NordicBet Liga
  - Denmark national football team
- (Czech Republic) Fortuna liga
- (Finland) Veikkausliiga
- (Germany) Deutsche Fußball Liga
  - Bundesliga
    - DFL-Supercup
  - 2. Bundesliga
- (Iceland) Úrvalsdeild
- (Netherlands) Eredivisie
- (Norway) Norwegian Football Association
  - Eliteserien
    - Mesterfinalen
  - Toppserien
- (Poland) I liga
- Liga Portuguesa de Futebol Profissional
  - Primeira Liga
  - Liga Portugal 2
  - Taça da Liga
- (Romania) Liga I
- (Sweden) Swedish Football Association
  - Allsvenskan
  - Superettan
- Professional Football League of Ukraine (Note: For Ukrainian First and Second leagues)
- (United States) United Soccer League (Note: For USL Championship, USL League One, USL League Two, USL Super League, USL W League and USL Youth)
- (United States) National Premier Soccer League
- (United States) Women's Premier Soccer League
- (United States) United Women's Soccer
- (United States) NAIA
- (United States) NJCAA
- Singapore Premier League

==== Club teams ====
- (Denmark) AB Tårnby
- (Denmark) Akademisk BK
- (Denmark) Lyngby
- (Denmark) Avarta
- (Denmark) Birkerød
- (Denmark) Gentofte-Vangede Idrætsforening
- (Denmark) Vendsyssel FF
- (Faroe Islands) 07 Vestur
- (Kenya) Kakamega Homeboyz
- (Norway) Hønefoss
- (Norway) Moss
- (Norway) Tromsø (Since 2016)
- (Oman) Fanja (Since 2016)
- (Singapore) Young Lions (Since 2025 -)
- (Sweden) Brage (Since 2015)
- (Sweden) GAIS
- (Sweden) Kalmar
- (Sweden) Sirius
- (Sweden) Utsiktens BK
- (Sweden) Örebro SK

=== Handball ===
==== National teams ====
- Austria
- Chile
- Faroe Islands
- Portugal

==== Club teams ====
- (Denmark) GOG
- (Denmark) KIF Kolding
- (France) Cavigal Nice
- (France) Dijon Métropole
- (France) Grand Nancy Métropole
- (France) Plan-de-Cuques
- (France) Sélestat Alsace
- (France) Valence
- (Germany) TSV Bayer Dormagen

==== Former sponsorships ====
In the past, Select S / A has also been a supplier to important sports teams and associations, including:

==== National teams ====
- Greenland
- New Caledonia
