= Ole Højgaard =

Danish footballer

Personal information
- Full name: Ole Højgaard Bryrup
- Date of birth: 12 February 1955 (age 71)
- Place of birth: Nørresundby, Denmark
- Position: Defender

Senior career*
Years	Team	Apps	(Gls)
1972–1980	KB		
1980–1982	Hellerup IK		

International career
1979	Denmark	5	(0)
- * Club domestic league appearances and goals

Ole Højgaard Bryrup (born 12 February 1955) is a Danish former footballer who played as a defender. He made five appearances for the Denmark national team in 1979.
