= Steen Blicher (footballer) =

Danish footballer (1923–2018)

Personal information
- Date of birth: 22 November 1923
- Date of death: 24 October 2018 (aged 94)
- Position: Midfielder

Senior career*
Years	Team	Apps	(Gls)
- KFUM's Boldklub
- Akademisk Boldklub

International career
1951–1952	Denmark	8	(0)
- * Club domestic league appearances and goals

Steen Blicher (22 November 1923 – 24 October 2018) was a Danish amateur footballer who played in the left half-back position. Blicher played eight games for the Denmark national football team, and was the captain of the Danish team at the 1952 Summer Olympics.

Blicher was a technically limited player, who more than compensated through an immense fighting spirit. He played his club football in Copenhagen with KFUM's Boldklub and later Akademisk Boldklub (AB). In AB, his favorite half-back position was occupied by Danish international Ivan Jensen, and Blicher played some matches as a left winger. When Ivan Jensen turned professional following the 1948 Summer Olympics, Blicher replaced him as the AB left half-back. Blicher was a part of the AB team which won the Danish Championship in 1947, as well as 1951 and 1952.

Blicher made his debut for the Danish national team on 12 May 1951, in a 1–3 defeat to the Scotland national football team. In the last warm-up game before the 1952 Summer Olympics, the Danish team captain, Knud Lundberg, was removed from the position, and Blicher was assigned the position. As Lundberg was Blicher's captain at AB, it was an awkward appointment, but Blicher led the team well through example. Denmark was eliminated by the Yugoslavia national football team in the quarter-finals by 3–5, which was Blicher's last international game.
