= Christian Morville =

Danish footballer (1891–1942)

Christian Viggo Morville (3 December 1891 – 21 December 1942) was a Danish amateur football player, who played one game for the Denmark national football team.

Morville played his entire career for Copenhagen club KB. He was a part of the Danish team at the 1912 Summer Olympics, but did not play any games. As an unused reserve player, he did not receive a medal, when Denmark won silver medals in the 1912 Olympic football tournament. Following the tournament, he played his only Danish national team game in October 1912.

The player had played in Russia in clubs "Sport" (St. Petersburg) 1913, 1914 and club "Neva" (St. Petersburg) 1915, 1916 years.
