= Pauli Jørgensen =

Danish footballer (1905–1993)

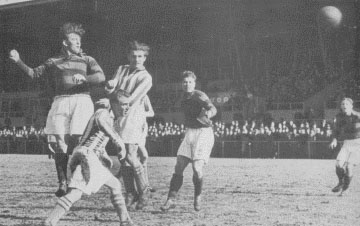
- Jørgensen (far left) ca. 1940

Personal information
- Full name: Etvin Pauli Carl Jørgensen
- Date of birth: 4 December 1905
- Place of birth: Frederiksberg, Denmark
- Date of death: 30 October 1993 (aged 87)
- Position: Centre-forward

Youth career
- 1916–1917: B 1908
- 1918–1919: Boldklubben Frem
- 1920–1923: Boldklubben Fix

Senior career*
| Years | Team | Apps | (Gls) |
| 1924–1942 | Boldklubben Frem | 297 | (288) |

International career
| 1925–1939 | Denmark | 47 | (44) |

Managerial career
- 1943–1945: Boldklubben Frem
- 1947–1948: Ski- og Ballklubben Drafn
- * Club domestic league appearances and goals

Etvin Carl Pauli Jørgensen (4 December 1905 – 30 October 1993), known simply as Pauli Jørgensen, was a Danish amateur football player and manager. In his position of centre forward, Jørgensen played 297 matches and scored 288 goals for Boldklubben Frem. He won four Danish championships with Frem as a player and coached the team to a fifth title. He played 47 international matches and scored 44 goals for the Denmark national team, making him the most capped Danish player for 22 years following his retirement. Furthermore, Jørgensen played around 75 matches for the Copenhagen representative team Stævnet.

Jørgensen was known as the most popular player in Danish football history. In 1930, he was named Best Nordic Centre Forward. In 1971, Jørgensen was honoured as the Danish football player who had meant the most for the game of football in Denmark during the first 50 years of the Danish Football Association (DBU). In his eighties, he made the Guinness book of records as the oldest active football player in Denmark.

== Club career ==
Born in Frederiksberg, Jørgensen played all of his club football within the Copenhagen area. His parents moved to Amager, where he began playing youth football for B 1908 in 1916. While playing for B 1908, the young Pauli watched an exhibition match between local Amager players and players from BK Frem, and was very impressed by the play of Frem's Danish internationals Sophus "Krølben" Nielsen and Sophus Hansen. He moved to the youth team of BK Frem in 1918, where he played alongside later internationals Kaj Uldaler and Knud Christoffersen. Then followed a stint at Amager club BK Fix from 1920 to 1923, when he was studying to become a car mechanic.

Jørgensen found his way back to Frem in 1924. This was to be his only club for the rest of his playing career. Two weeks after his return, Jørgensen made his debut for the senior BK Frem team and scored two goals as Frem beat KFUMs Boldklub 4–2. Frem was a working man's club which played in the yearly Copenhagen Championships as well as the Copenhagen Cup. Under coach Axel A. Byrval, Pauli established himself in the Frem team which won the 1925 Copenhagen Cup, beating Akademisk Boldklub (AB) 5–1 in the final. Frem also won the Copenhagen Cup in 1927. The winner of the Copenhagen Championship went on to play the best team from the rest of Denmark for the title of Danish champion. In the first years with Pauli in the team, Frem's best finish was a 3rd place in the 1925–26 Copenhagen Championship. In 1927, a nationwide competition was inaugurated, and Pauli's footballing skills could now be seen by spectators around the country.

In the ensuing 1927–28 Danish championship, Frem finished in a three-way joint first place, and due to lack of regulations for such an instance, no winner was declared in the end. Pauli had to wait another three years before winning the Danish championship. In the 1930–31 Danish championship, Jørgensen led Frem to the second Danish championship in club history, as the team ended with 17 points following eight wins and one draw in nine games. The tournament included meriting victories such as 10–3 against three-time Danish champions B 1903 and 3–1 against runners-up Kjøbenhavns Boldklub. With Jørgensen the leading player, Frem won the Danish championship again in the 1932–33 season, this time finishing with 16 points. Jørgensen won his third championship in the closely contested 1935–36 season, as Frem edged ahead of runners-up Akademisk Boldklub (AB) on goal average. Frem and AB both finished on 15 points, Frem having even lost 3–1 to AB during the season, but Frem's goal tally of 36 goals for and 15 goals against beat AB's 29 for and 14 against in the end.

Ahead of the 1936–37 season, the number of games was doubled to 18. At the same time, it is the first Danish national tournament for which a top goalscorer is recorded, and this honor fell to Jørgensen. He topped the scoring table with 19 goals, but had to see Frem finish second, as AB won the championship. During his time at Frem, the club also won the Copenhagen Cup in 1938 and 1940. Jørgensen won his last Danish championship with Frem as a player in the 1940–41 Danish War Tournament, before ending his playing career in 1942. His last game for the club came under special circumstances, as Frem played B 1909 in the quarterfinals of the 1941–42 Danish War Tournament. The teams drew the game 2–2, and the referee, to Pauli's great displeasure, decided the winner by a coin toss. By his retirement, Pauli had scored 288 goals in 297 games for Frem between 1924 and 1942.

Following his playing career, Jørgensen became a coach, and managed BK Frem to the 1943–44 Danish War Tournament trophy, beating AB 4–2 in the final. He also coached Ski- og Ballklubben Drafn. He became part of the BK Frem sporting board, but was ousted in 1960 by former Danish international John Hansen.

== International career ==
Jørgensen made his international debut for the Denmark national team on 27 September 1925, in a friendly match against Finland played in Aarhus. The Danish team selection was marked by several Copenhagen clubs having withdrawn their players in order to play club matches on the same day, and Jørgensen was one of five players making their debut. He took advantage of the opportunity given. Denmark were trailing 3–1 by the half-time break, when he scored two goals in the second half for a 3–3 final score. The Finland game was also the last international game of centre forward Poul "Tist" Nielsen, who held a double record of 38 games played and 52 goals scored for the Danish national team.

On 30 October 1927, Jørgensen made his breakthrough in the national team, with a goal in the 3–1 win against Norway. Pauli was offered a professional contract with English club Huddersfield in 1928, but he eventually rejected the offer, part of the reason being that, like all professional players, he would be banned from representing the amateur-only Danish national team. From June 1928 to 1934, Jørgensen played all 26 Danish international games in a row, scoring 29 goals. This included securing the 1924–28 Nordic Football Championship title for Denmark on 7 October 1928, when he scored the second Danish goal of the 3–1 victory against Sweden; the de facto final of the tournament. His importance for Denmark was most evident in the four games of 1930, in which he scored one goal in a 6–1 win against the Finland national football team, three goals in a 6–1 win against Sweden, and another three in the 6–3 win against Germany, before he was injured and substituted during a game against Norway, which Denmark then lost 0–1.

Jørgensen was by now the most popular player in Danish footballing history. In June 1932, he was named team captain, in the absence of regular captain Fritz Tarp. Jørgensen went on to captain Denmark for 12 games between 1932 and 1937, taking turns with other players to sport the captain's armband. He did have a few brushes with the leaders of the Danish Football Association (DBU), who handed Pauli a one-year ban from the national team for "bad behavior" in 1933, only to retract the punishment before the next game. On 16 May 1937, Jørgensen was captain in the game known as the Battle of Breslau, in which the Danish team lost 8–0 to Germany. Seven players were subsequently dropped from the Danish team, including Pauli. He played just one international game in 1938, but returned to the team for DBU's 50-year anniversary tournament in June 1939. Here, he spurred the team on to cope with the strict training regimen of English coach Edward Magner, and Jørgensen scored three goals as Norway were defeated 6–3 in the tournament final.

Jørgensen was back in the Danish starting line-up, and on 17 September 1939, he broke Fritz Tarp and Valdemar Laursen's joint record from 1934, as he became the first Dane to play 45 games for the national team. The game was an 8–1 win against the Finland national football team in the 1937–47 Nordic Football Championship, and Pauli scored a single goal. On 22 October 1939, Jørgensen played his last game for Denmark, scoring two goals as Norway was beaten 4–1, and setting a record 47 international games played for Denmark. The record stood for 22 years, until Poul Pedersen played his 48th international game in September 1961. Pauli's tally of 44 goals for Denmark was second only to Poul "Tist" Nielsen. In February 2007, Jørgensen was also bested by Jon Dahl Tomasson, who scored his 45th international goal for Denmark.

== Style of play ==
Jørgensen played in the centre forward position and had a likening of shooting on goal with half-volleyed shots. He was of small stature.

== Other activities ==
In 1932, he played a Danish footballer in the Swedish film Hans livs match. For a time he was a journalist on the communist paper Land og Folk.

== Career statistics ==
Scores and results list Denmark's goal tally first, score column indicates score after each Jørgensen goal.

List of international goals scored by Pauli Jørgensen
| No. | Date | Venue | Opponent | Score | Result | Competition |
|---|---|---|---|---|---|---|
| 1 | 27 September 1925 | Aarhus, Denmark | Finland | 2–3 | 3–3 | Friendly |
| 2 | 27 September 1925 | Aarhus, Denmark | Finland | 3–3 | 3–3 | Friendly |
| 3 | 30 October 1927 | Copenhagen, Denmark | Norway | 1–1 | 3–1 | 1924–28 Nordic Football Championship |
| 4 | 17 June 1928 | Oslo, Norway | Norway | 3–1 | 3–2 | 1924–28 Nordic Football Championship |
| 5 | 16 September 1928 | Nürnberg, Germany | Germany | 1–0 | 1–2 | Friendly |
| 6 | 7 October 1928 | Copenhagen, Denmark | Sweden | 2–0 | 3–1 | 1924–28 Nordic Football Championship |
| 7 | 23 June 1929 | Copenhagen, Denmark | Norway | 1–0 | 2–5 | 1929–32 Nordic Football Championship |
| 8 | 13 October 1929 | Copenhagen, Denmark | Finland | 1–0 | 8–0 | 1929–32 Nordic Football Championship |
| 9 | 13 October 1929 | Copenhagen, Denmark | Finland | 4–0 | 8–0 | 1929–32 Nordic Football Championship |
| 10 | 13 October 1929 | Copenhagen, Denmark | Finland | 7–0 | 8–0 | 1929–32 Nordic Football Championship |
| 11 | 16 June 1930 | Helsinki, Finland | Finland | 6–0 | 6–1 | 1929–32 Nordic Football Championship |
| 12 | 22 June 1930 | Copenhagen, Denmark | Sweden | 1–0 | 6–1 | 1929–32 Nordic Football Championship |
| 13 | 22 June 1930 | Copenhagen, Denmark | Sweden | 3–0 | 6–1 | 1929–32 Nordic Football Championship |
| 14 | 22 June 1930 | Copenhagen, Denmark | Sweden | 5–1 | 6–1 | 1929–32 Nordic Football Championship |
| 15 | 7 September 1930 | Copenhagen, Denmark | Germany | 2–0 | 6–3 | Friendly |
| 16 | 7 September 1930 | Copenhagen, Denmark | Germany | 5–2 | 6–3 | Friendly |
| 17 | 7 September 1930 | Copenhagen, Denmark | Germany | 6–3 | 6–3 | Friendly |
| 18 | 25 May 1931 | Copenhagen, Denmark | Norway | 1–1 | 3–1 | 1929–32 Nordic Football Championship |
| 19 | 25 May 1931 | Copenhagen, Denmark | Norway | 2–1 | 3–1 | 1929–32 Nordic Football Championship |
| 20 | 28 June 1931 | Stockholm, Sweden | Sweden | 1–0 | 1–3 | 1929–32 Nordic Football Championship |
| 21 | 27 September 1931 | Hannover, Germany | Germany | 2–1 | 2–4 | Friendly |
| 22 | 5 June 1932 | Copenhagen, Denmark | Belgium | 3–0 | 3–4 | Friendly |
| 23 | 19 June 1932 | Copenhagen, Denmark | Sweden | 3–1 | 3–1 | 1929–32 Nordic Football Championship |
| 24 | 30 August 1932 | Helsinki, Finland | Finland | 1–0 | 2–4 | 1929–32 Nordic Football Championship |
| 25 | 30 August 1932 | Helsinki, Finland | Finland | 2–3 | 2–4 | 1929–32 Nordic Football Championship |
| 26 | 25 September 1932 | Oslo, Norway | Norway | 1–0 | 2–1 | 1929–32 Nordic Football Championship |
| 27 | 9 October 1932 | Copenhagen, Denmark | Scotland | 1–0 | 3–1 | Friendly |
| 28 | 18 June 1933 | Stockholm, Sweden | Sweden | 1–2 | 3–2 | 1933–36 Nordic Football Championship |
| 29 | 21 May 1934 | Copenhagen, Denmark | Poland | 3–0 | 4–2 | Friendly |
| 30 | 21 May 1934 | Copenhagen, Denmark | Poland | 4–1 | 4–2 | Friendly |
| 31 | 17 June 1934 | Copenhagen, Denmark | Sweden | 2–3 | 3–5 | 1933–36 Nordic Football Championship |
| 32 | 17 June 1934 | Copenhagen, Denmark | Sweden | 3–3 | 3–5 | 1933–36 Nordic Football Championship |
| 33 | 16 June 1935 | Gothenburg, Sweden | Sweden | 1–0 | 1–3 | 1933–36 Nordic Football Championship |
| 34 | 14 June 1936 | Copenhagen, Denmark | Sweden | 3–2 | 4–3 | 1933–36 Nordic Football Championship |
| 35 | 30 June 1936 | Helsinki, Finland | Finland | 1–1 | 4–1 | 1933–36 Nordic Football Championship |
| 36 | 30 June 1936 | Helsinki, Finland | Finland | 3–1 | 4–1 | 1933–36 Nordic Football Championship |
| 37 | 20 September 1936 | Oslo, Norway | Norway | 2–2 | 3–3 | 1933–36 Nordic Football Championship |
| 38 | 18 June 1939 | Copenhagen, Denmark | Norway | 1–0 | 6–3 | DBU 50-year anniversary cup |
| 39 | 18 June 1939 | Copenhagen, Denmark | Norway | 4–3 | 6–3 | DBU 50-year anniversary cup |
| 40 | 18 June 1939 | Copenhagen, Denmark | Norway | 6–3 | 6–3 | DBU 50-year anniversary cup |
| 41 | 17 September 1939 | Copenhagen, Denmark | Finland | 5–0 | 8–1 | 1937–47 Nordic Football Championship |
| 42 | 1 October 1939 | Stockholm, Sweden | Sweden | 1–0 | 1–4 | 1937–47 Nordic Football Championship |
| 43 | 22 October 1939 | Copenhagen, Denmark | Norway | 3–1 | 4–1 | 1937–47 Nordic Football Championship |
| 44 | 22 October 1939 | Copenhagen, Denmark | Norway | 4–1 | 4–1 | 1937–47 Nordic Football Championship |

== Honours ==
=== Player ===
Frem

- Danish Championships: 1930–31, 1932–33, 1935–36, 1940–41
- Copenhagen Cup: 1925, 1927, 1938, 1940

Denmark

- 1924–28 Nordic Football Championship

Individual

- Best Nordic Centre Forward: 1930
- Danish 1st Division Top Goalscorer: 1936–37
- Most Valuable Player in the First 50 Years of the Danish FA: 1971

=== Manager ===
Frem

- Danish Championship: 1943–44

== Bibliography ==
- Skyd - Pauli : Fodboldspilleren Pauli Jørgensens Erindringer, Arnkrone, 1944 (autobiography)
