= Dion Ørnvold =

Danish footballer (1921-2006)

Medal record

Men's football

Representing Denmark

Olympic Games
Bronze medal – third place	1948 London	Team competition

Dion Erhardt Ørnvold (17 October 1921 – 23 January 2006), known as Dion Ørnvold, was a Danish association football player in the midfielder position. He started his career with Kjøbenhavns Boldklub, before turning professional and playing 22 games for Italian club SPAL 1907 during the 1951–52 Serie A season. He played 18 games for the Denmark national football team from 1947 to 1951, with whom he won a bronze medal at the 1948 Summer Olympics. He also played for the Denmark national under-21 football team.

Ørnvold was a quick player with good anticipation of the game. At the 1948 Olympics, Ørnvold was deployed out of position as center half. He did surprisingly well, but was physically over-matched by forwards Gunnar Nordahl and Garvis Carlsson in the semi-final against the Sweden men's national football team.
