= Niels Bennike =

Danish footballer (1925–2016)

Personal information
- Date of birth: 6 August 1925
- Place of birth: Copenhagen, Denmark
- Date of death: 8 March 2016 (aged 90)
- Position: Midfielder

Senior career*
| Years | Team | Apps | (Gls) |
| 1943–1950 | KB | | |
| 1950–1953 | SPAL 1907 | 94 | (23) |
| 1953–1954 | Genoa C.F.C. | 26 | (5) |
| 1954–1955 | FC Nancy | | |

International career
| 1945–1947 | Denmark U-21 | 3 | (1) |
| 1945–1950 | Denmark | 7 | (0) |
- * Club domestic league appearances and goals

Niels Bennike (6 August 1925 – 8 March 2016) was a Danish football player.
