= Steen Steensen Blicher (footballer) =

Danish footballer

Steen Steensen Blicher (11 January 1899 – 1 August 1965) was a Danish amateur football player in the defender position, who competed with the Denmark national football team at the 1920 Summer Olympics. Born in Copenhagen, he played his club football with Kjøbenhavns Boldklub, winning the Danish championship in 1917, 1918, 1922, and 1925. He made his national team debut in October 1918, and played 27 games and scored five goals until June 1929. He died on 1 August 1965, while living at Frederiksberg, Copenhagen.

He was the father of Danish international footballer Steen Blicher.

== Sources ==
- Steen Steensen Blicher national team profile at the Danish Football Association (in Danish)
- Haslund.info profile
- Palle "Banks" Jørgensen: "Landsholdets 681 Profiler", TIPS-bladet, 2002. ISBN 87-91264-01-4
