= Georg Brysting =

Danish footballer (1891-1975)

Personal information
- Date of birth: 30 December 1891
- Place of birth: Keldby, Denmark
- Date of death: 26 October 1975 (aged 83)
- Position: Defender

Senior career*
Years	Team	Apps	(Gls)
1910–1918	Kjøbenhavns Boldklub		

International career
1912–1918	Denmark	17	(0)
- * Club domestic league appearances and goals

Georg Brysting (30 December 1891 – 26 October 1975) was a Danish footballer who played as a defender for Kjøbenhavns Boldklub. He made 17 appearances for the Denmark national team from 1912 to 1918.
