= Bjørn Rasmussen =

Danish footballer (1885-1962)

Medal record

Men's Football

Representing Denmark

Olympic Games
Silver medal – second place	1908 London	Team competition

Bjørn Vilhelm Ravn Rasmussen (19 May 1885 – 9 August 1962) was a Danish amateur football (soccer) player in the striker position, who won a silver medal with the Danish national team in the 1908 Summer Olympics football tournament. Rasmussen played two games for the Danish national team. He played his club football with Kjøbenhavns Boldklub.
