= Niels Hagenau =

Danish footballer (born 1943)

Personal information
- Date of birth: 4 December 1943 (age 82)

International career
Years	Team	Apps	(Gls)
1971	Denmark	5	(0)

Niels Hagenau (born 4 December 1943) is a Danish footballer. He played in five matches for the Denmark national football team in 1971.
