= Gert Hansen =

Danish footballer (born 1937)

Personal information
- Full name: Gert Erling Hansen
- Date of birth: 27 October 1937 (age 89)
- Position: Defender

Senior career*
Years	Team	Apps	(Gls)
- KFUM.s Boldklub Odense
- KB

International career
1961	Denmark	2	(0)
- * Club domestic league appearances and goals

Gert Erling Hansen (born 27 October 1937) is a Danish former footballer who played as a defender. He made two appearances for the Denmark national team in 1961.
