= Eiler Holm =

Danish footballer (1904-1987)

Personal information
- Full name: Eiler Holm
- Date of birth: 2 April 1904
- Place of birth: Copenhagen, Denmark
- Date of death: 6 December 1965 (aged 61)
- Position: Right back

Youth career
- Boldklubben Frem

Senior career*
Years	Team	Apps	(Gls)
1921–1934	Boldklubben Frem	160	(11)

International career
1923–1928	Denmark	3	(0)
- * Club domestic league appearances and goals

Eiler Holm (2 April 1904 – 6 April 1987) was a Danish amateur footballer who spent his entire club career with Boldklubben Frem. Holm, who worked as a butcher on the side, was known as a talented and robust but not very hard-working player.

== Honours ==
- Danish champion: 1922–23, 1930–31 and 1932–33 with Frem
