= Eigil Nielsen (footballer, born 1918) =

Danish footballer

Personal information
- Full name: Eigil Louis Marius Ferdinand Nielsen
- Date of birth: 15 September 1918
- Place of birth: Esbjerg, Denmark
- Date of death: 7 September 2000 (aged 81)
- Place of death: Frederiksberg, Copenhagen, Denmark
- Position: Goalkeeper

Senior career*
| Years | Team | Apps | (Gls) |
| 1940–1952 | KB | | |

International career
| 1940–1951 | Denmark | 28 | (0) |
Medal record
Olympic Games
| Bronze medal – third place | 1948 London | Team competition |
- * Club domestic league appearances and goals

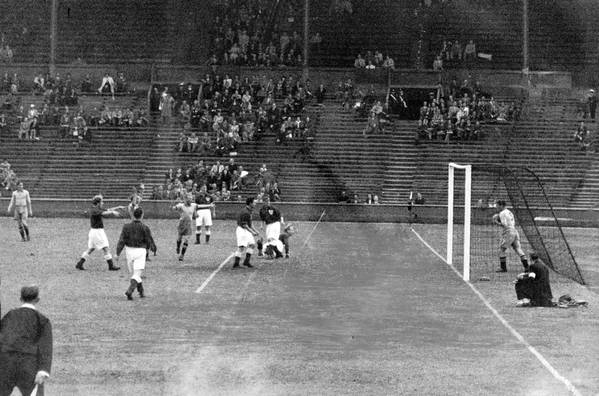
Olympic semifinal 1948.jpg

Eigil Louis Marius Ferdinand Nielsen, known simply as Eigil Nielsen (15 September 1918 – 7 September 2000) was a Danish amateur football goalkeeper, who played 28 games for the Denmark national football team and won a bronze medal with Denmark at the 1948 Summer Olympics. He played his club football with KB.

Originally from Esbjerg, Eigil Nielsen was not selected for the Danish national team, until he moved to Copenhagen club Kjøbenhavns Boldklub (KB). At KB, Eigil impressed with his quickness, judgement of ball-flight, and long-range goal kicks. He made his debut for the Danish national team in October 1940, but did enjoy a prolonged run in the team until 1947. He was the starting goalkeeper at the 1948 Summer Olympics, where his long-range goal kick served as an in-direct assist for one of John Hansen's goals in the 5–3 defeat of the Italy national football team. Denmark won bronze medals at the tournament, and Eigil Nielsen was considered on par with legendary goalkeeper Svend Jensen; a status not equalled until Peter Schmeichel in the 1990s. Eigil Nielsen played his 28th and last international game in October 1951.

== Father of the modern football ==
While playing, Nielsen worked in the shoe and leather industry for additional financial support. This gave him the opportunity to explore and develop his own football designs. As a result, he founded the Select Sport company in 1947, which continues today as one of the world's largest companies producing footballs.

Eigil Nielsen is credited with creating the common 32-panel football design in 1962 using 20 hexagonal and 12 pentagonal patches. It quickly became popular when the Adidas Telstar in 1970 became the first football in the World Cup to use the design.
