= Fritz Tarp =

Danish footballer (1899-1958)

Personal information
- Full name: Fritz Albert Tarp
- Date of birth: 2 August 1899
- Place of birth: Ringsted, Denmark
- Date of death: 9 January 1958 (aged 58)
- Position: Defender

Youth career
- ?–?: HIK
- ?–1916: B 93

Senior career*
Years	Team	Apps	(Gls)
1916–1936	B 93	250	(28)

International career
1918–1934	Denmark	44	(0)
- * Club domestic league appearances and goals

Fritz Albert Tarp (2 August 1899 – 9 January 1958) was a Danish football (soccer) player, who played 44 games for the Denmark national football team from 1918 to 1934, 26 of these as team captain. He was an unused substitute in the Danish team at the 1920 Summer Olympics.

== Biography ==
Born in Ringsted, Tarp played as a defender for Copenhagen clubs Hellerup IK and B 93. He was considered a great dribbler and tackler, achieving great fame in Danish football. At B 93, he played alongside Danish internationals Svend Jensen and Henry Nielsen.

Tarp made his national team debut in June 1918. He was in the Danish team at the 1920 Summer Olympics, but spent the tournament as an unused reserve. He eventually established himself as a starter, and went on to captain the team in 26 games, a Danish record at the time. In September 1932, he broke Michael Rohde's record from 1931, when Tarp became the first Dane to play 41 international games. After his 42nd international game in October 1932, his national team career went on a two-year hiatus, during which Valdemar Laursen reached his 42nd international as well. Tarp was recalled to the Danish team in September 1934, and he and Valdemar Laursen played the following two games together. Tarp and Laursen ended their international careers in October 1934, having both played a record-setting 44 games for the national team. The record was eventually broken by Pauli Jørgensen in September 1939.

Fritz Tarp died at Frederiksberg Hospital on 9 January 1958, having lived in Copenhagen at his time of death.
