= Robert Jensen (footballer) =

Danish footballer

Personal information
- Date of birth: 11 June 1895
- Date of death: 6 July 1967 (aged 72)

International career
Years	Team	Apps	(Gls)
1925	Denmark	1	(0)

Robert Jensen (11 June 1895 – 6 July 1967) was a Danish footballer. He played in one match for the Denmark national football team in 1925.
