= Ivan Jensen =

Danish footballer (1922–2009)

Olympic medal record

Men's Football
Bronze medal – third place	1948 London	Team competition

Tage Ivan Jensen, mostly known as Ivan Jensen for short (November 10, 1922 – January 26, 2009) was a Danish association footballer, who won three Danish championships with amateur club Akademisk Boldklub and played professionally for Italian club Bologna FC. He played 25 games and scored two goals for the Denmark national football team and won a bronze medal at the 1948 Summer Olympics.

== Biography ==
Born in Copenhagen, Hansen started playing with local clubs KFUM's Boldklub and Akademisk Boldklub (AB). He was a hard working defensive midfielder, physically imposing with a great stamina, but also an elegant player on and off the field. Jensen won three Danish championships with AB in 1943, 1945, and 1947, and made his debut for the Denmark national football team in September 1945. Even in his first international years, Ivan Jensen was known for his poor technique, and he and AB teammate Egon Mathiesen would practice for hours on end, before Jensen had taught himself a sufficient technique. He went on to play 25 games and score two goals for the national team, including four games as Denmark won a bronze medal at the 1948 Summer Olympics in London. Jensen signed a professional contract in 1949, and was excluded from further games with the amateur-only Danish national team.

He moved abroad to play professionally for Italian club Bologna FC in the Serie A championship. He quickly gained popularity in Bologna, and was asked to recommend another Danish player for the club. He chose fellow Danish international Axel Pilmark, who was then signed. Jensen continued his technique training with Pilmark, now learning from one of the finest technicians of the game. The two complemented each other perfectly in the Bologna midfield, with Jensen the defensive anchor supporting Pilmark's offensive playmaking passes. Ivan Jensen would even drop down into the Bologna back three, in effect transforming Bologna's formation into an elastic 4-3-3, many years ahead of its time. Serie A rivals Juventus FC made an offer to buy Jensen during his time at Bologna, but Bologna chairman Renato Dall'Ara kept the bid a secret in order to keep his defensive star. Jensen spent seven seasons with Bologna, playing 180 games and scoring one goal in Serie A before he retired in 1956.

Jensen was an educated teacher, and attended several courses in Roman history at the University of Bologna during his time in Bologna. When he ended his playing career, he became a teacher in Gladsaxe. He studied at the University of Copenhagen, and became a gymnasium teacher in Lyngby. He continued playing amateur football until above the age of 70, and wrote a number of books on football. He died on January 26, 2009, in Vedbæk.

== Honours ==
- Danish championships: 1943, 1945, 1947
