= Poul Christiansen =

Danish footballer (1897–1968)

Personal information
- Full name: Poul Leonhard Christiansen
- Date of birth: 30 October 1897
- Place of birth: Frederiksberg, Denmark
- Date of death: 31 July 1968 (aged 70)
- Position: Goalkeeper

International career
Years	Team	Apps	(Gls)
1925	Denmark	1	(0)

Poul Christiansen (30 October 1897 – 31 July 1968) was a Danish footballer. He played in one match for the Denmark national football team in 1925.
