= KFUMs Boldklub København =

Danish sports club

KFUMs Boldklub
- Full name: KFUMs Boldklub København 1899
- Short name: KFUM
- Founded: 4 June 1899
- Ground: Emdrupparken, Copenhagen NV
- Capacity: 2,000
- League: Denmark Series (V)
- 2021–22: Denmark Series – Group 2, 4th of 10
- Website: http://www.kfum-fodbold.dk/default.aspx

KFUMs Boldklub (also known as KFUM) is a Danish sports club based in Emdrup in the Bispebjerg district of Copenhagen, founded in 1899. The club is best known for its 1940s amateur football team. It played six seasons in the top-flight Danish football championship from 1940 to 1958.

KFUM is an independent sports club under the Copenhagen KFUM Centralforeningen (English: YMCA Central Association). Apart from football, KFUM has also had teams playing team handball, badminton, and table tennis. These other sports teams branched off in 2001, leaving only football at KFUMs Boldklub.

== History ==
KFUMs Boldklub was founded on 4 June 1899, under the name of Kristelig Idrætsforening (English: Christian Sports Association). KFUM's football team played its first competitive game in 1901, losing 14–0 to Akademisk Boldklub. When the four biggest teams decided to quit the Copenhagen Football Association, KFUM was one of the replacement teams in the 1911 Copenhagen Football Championship. KFUM finished the tournament in joint last place, and was moved out of the championship when the big teams returned for the following season.

KFUM competed in the lower tiers of Copenhagen football until 1930, when the club entered the nationwide Danish 2nd Division. During the Occupation of Denmark in World War II, KFUM was included in the top-flight Danish football championship. KFUM reached the semi-finals of the 1940–41 Danish War Tournament and the quarter-finals for the following three seasons. After the war, KFUM was moved to the 2nd Division again. When KFUM finished in second place in the 1956–57 2nd Division season, the club won promotion for the top-flight Danish 1st Division. It was a short trip to the 1st Division; following 11 points in 22 games, KFUM were relegated straight back into the 2nd Division. KFUM played on in the 2nd and Danish 3rd Division. The club was relegated from the 3rd Division into the lower leagues in 1975, and has not since played in the upper divisions.

The football club played its games at the Fælledparken, a common shared by the smaller Copenhagen clubs. In 1921, KFUM moved to Emdrupparken, where a new club house was built in 1943, designed by architect Arne Jacobsen. KFUM was one of several small Copenhagen clubs who founded the Alliancen association. Alliancen arranged exhibition games to earn spectator entrance fees, and was in direct competition with the high-profile Stævnet association.

== International players ==
As a small club, KFUM saw its best players move to the bigger Copenhagen clubs, including later Danish national team players Karl Aage Hansen, Ivan Jensen, Steen Blicher, Dan Ohland-Andersen, and Gert Hansen. Only three players represented KFUM in the national team:

- Einar Larsen (1923)
- Axel W. Petersen (1946)
- Egon Hansen (1965)
