= Valdemar Laursen =

Danish footballer

Valdemar Kristian Laursen (30 August 1900 – 14 April 1989), known simply as Valdemar Laursen, was a Danish amateur football (soccer) player, who played 44 games and scored one goal for the Denmark national football team. He played his entire club career as a midfielder for Copenhagen club KB.

== Biography ==
Laursen was born in Frederiksberg in 1900.

Laursen debuted for the Danish national team in October 1918, at 18 years and 51 days of age. In July 1934, he equalled Fritz Tarp's record from 1932, when Laursen became the second Dane to play 42 international games. Tarp subsequently returned to the Danish team in September 1934, and Valdemar Laursen and he played the following two international games together. Laursen and Tarp ended their international careers in October 1934, both havingplayed a record-setting 44 games for the national team. Pauli Jørgensen eventually broke the record in September 1939.

Laursen later became a football referee, officiating the friendly match between Belgium and Scotland in May 1947. He died in Frederiksberg in 1989.
