= KBUs Pokalturnering =

- Organiser(s): Copenhagen FA (KBU)
- Founded: 1910; 116 years ago
- Abolished: 1953; 73 years ago
- Region: Copenhagen, Denmark
- Teams: Varied (1910–1919); 8 (1920–1946); 52 (1947–1953)
- Last champions: B.93 (1953)
- Most championships: B.93 (13 titles)

KBUs Pokalturnering (unofficial English translation: KBU Cup, Copenhagen Cup) was a Danish regional knockout association football competition contested annually from 1910 to 1953 by clubs that were members of the regional football association Copenhagen FA (KBU). Organised by and named after KBU, the competition rules has varied from being open to all Copenhagen clubs (1910–1919 and 1947–1953) and being a closed tournament (1920–1946) reserved only for the highest ranking clubs, and as a consequence the number of participants have varied greatly throughout its history. For the first 10 seasons, between 7 and 13 teams participated until a fixed number of 8 teams was introduced from 1920 until 1946. When both the Sommerpokalturneringen (who for several seasons had functioned as a qualifying tournament) and the KBUs B-Pokalturnering, both featuring the lower ranking KBU teams, were discontinued after their 1946 edition, the Copenhagen FA again allowed lower ranking clubs to participate in the association's primary cup competition, increasing the number of teams to 52. For the most part, the competition took place in the fall season (6 seasons ended in the following spring season) and since the 1913 edition culminating in a final played at Københavns Idrætspark that saw large attendance figures and generated much media coverage.

Due to a conflict regarding majority voting at KBU, the top four field-owning clubs (Baneklubberne) of the era did not participate in the 1911 edition of the cup, that only had the non-field-owning clubs (Fælledklubberne) participating. Instead they formed their own cup tournament that fall season, Baneklubberne Cup in the fall of 1911, until returning to the tournament the following spring season. The cup tournament was discontinued after the 1953 edition due to the introduction of the nationwide Danish Cup in 1954. In the 44 tournaments held, a total of 66 clubs participated, only 10 teams took part in the finals, 9 teams secured a cup victory, 743 matches were played and 3,723 goals scored. The most successful club in the history of the tournament were Østerbro-based B.93, who won a total of 13 cup titles and appeared as a losing finalist on 11 occasions.

== Trophy and prizes ==
Each year, the winning team was presented with the cup trophy. Four trophies were distributed during the tournament's duration. A club had to win five finals in total, also known as lots, to keep the trophy permanently. Due to a conflict, the 1911 tournament did not have the participation of the best clubs in the highest Copenhagen Football League, who owned their own ground. The clubs participated with reserve teams in the 1914 edition due to many of the first squad players being summoned by the Danish mobilization at the outbreak of World War I, so it was decided that the cup trophy would not be in play, and hence Kjøbenhavns Boldklub did not gain a lot this year by winning the final match for the fifth time in the tournament's history. Three clubs have earned this honour: the 1st trophy by B 1903 in 1924, 2nd trophy by B.93 in 1932, 3rd trophy by Akademisk BK in 1949, while the fourth and last trophy was kept by the Copenhagen FA. On some occasions, the runners-up would receive a commemorative plaque for their participation in the final.

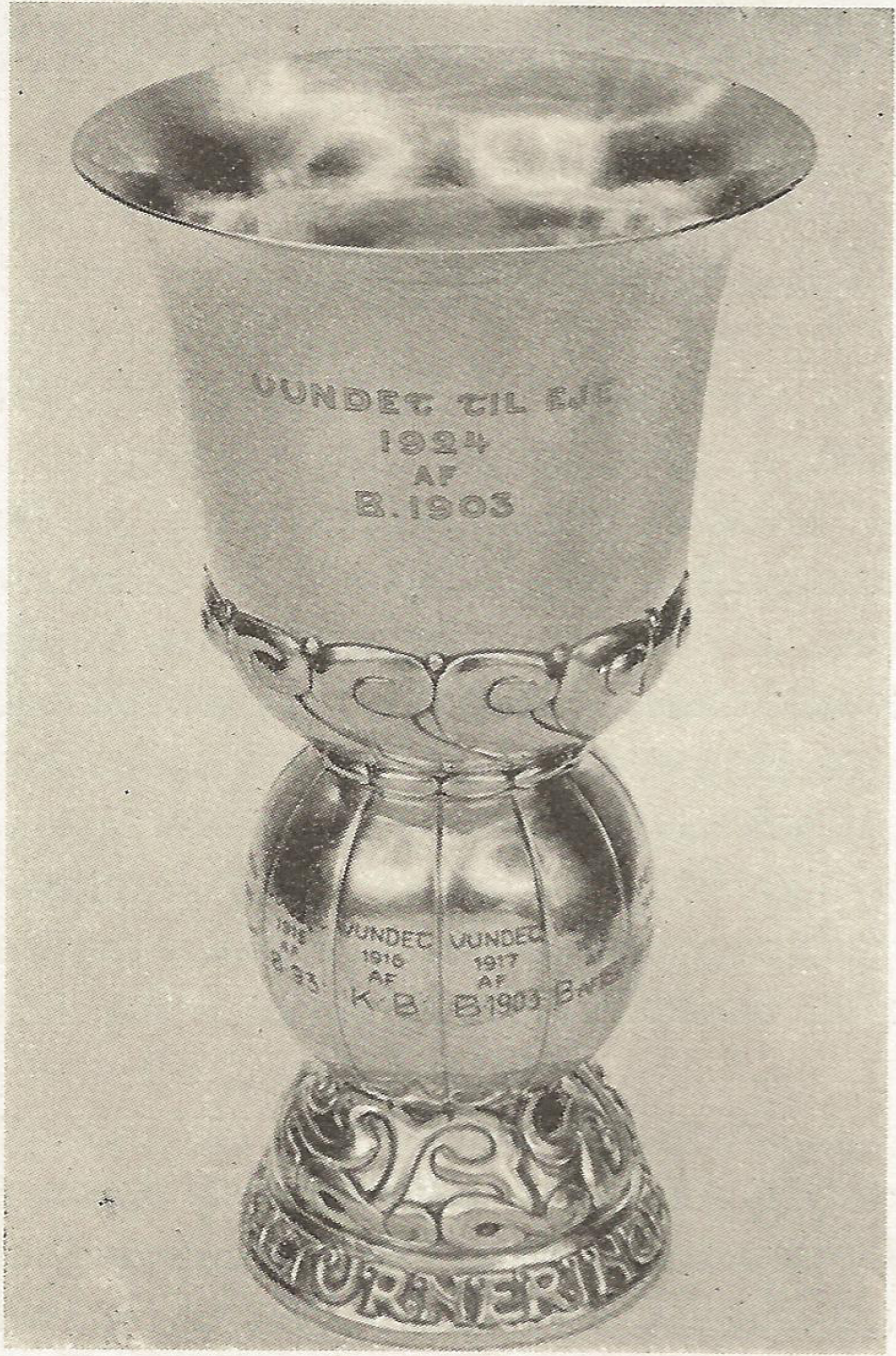
The first trophy distributed for the KBUs Pokalturnering, won by B 1903 in 1924 after 5 cup victories and for permanent ownership.

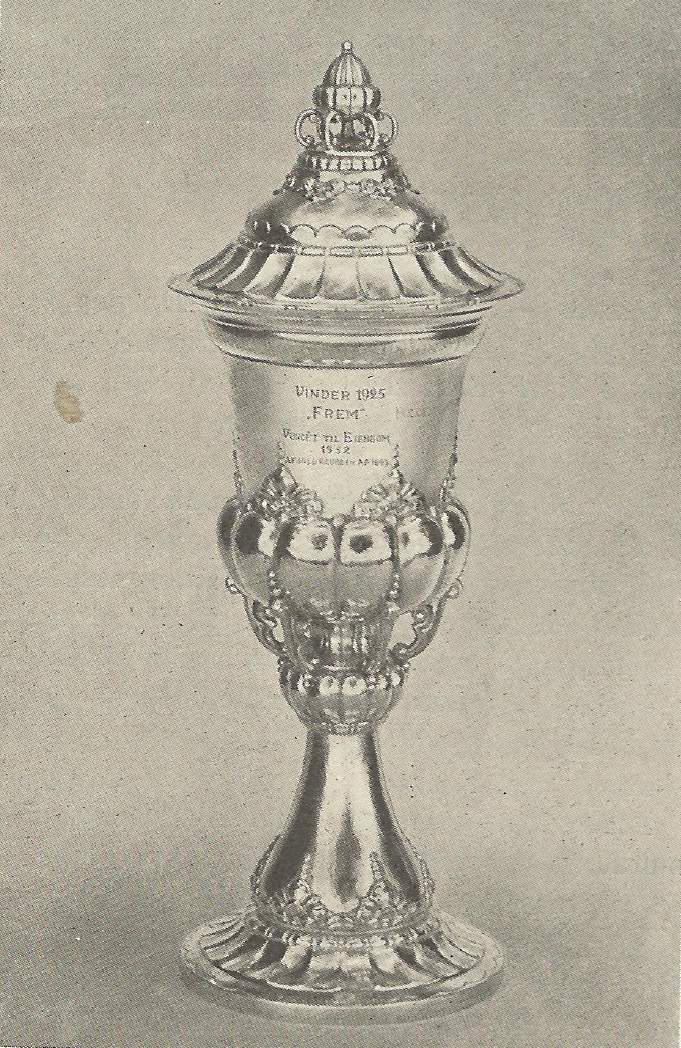
The second trophy distributed for the cup tournament between 1925 and the 1932 edition, where it was won for permanent ownership by B.93.

The third trophy distributed between the 1933 and the 1949 edition and now owned by Akademisk BK.

The fourth trophy distributed between the 1950 and the 1953 edition and retained by Copenhagen FA.

== Finals ==
| Key | Explanation |
| ^{†} | Winners also won the Copenhagen championship (1910–1936) or the Danish championship (1936–1954) during the same season. |
| ^{‡} | Team was playing outside the top division of the regional (1910–1936) or national (1936–1954) league structure. |
| (a.e.t.) | After extra time (two periods of 15 minutes each) in use between 1910 and 1924. Additional match was scheduled, if game was still tied. |
| (R) | Replay match (entire new match scheduled) in use between 1925 and 1953. Two extra periods was used in any additional matches. |
| (number of cup wins) | A running tally of the total number of cup titles won by each club is kept in brackets. |

| Season | Final Date | Winner | Result | Runner-up | Venue | Attendance | Ref |
|---|---|---|---|---|---|---|---|
| 1910 | 23 October 1910 | B.93 (1) | 2–0 | Kjøbenhavns BK | B.93's Bane at Øster Allé and St. James's Church, Østerbro | 6,000 | |
| 1911 | 10 December 1911 | BK Velo (1) | 5–0 | BK Viktoria | Østerfælled, Østerbro | 500 | |
| 1912 | 10 November 1912 | Kjøbenhavns BK (1)^{†} | 8–1 | B 1903 | KB's Bane at Sankt Markus Allé, Frederiksberg | 1,000 | |
| 1913 | 16 November 1913 | Kjøbenhavns BK (2)^{†} | 4–1 | BK Frem | Københavns Idrætspark, Copenhagen | 10,000 | |
| 1914 | 8 November 1914 | Kjøbenhavns BK (3) | 4–3 | Akademisk BK | Københavns Idrætspark, Copenhagen | 4,000 | |
| 1915 | 7 November 1915 | B.93 (2) | 4–1 | Akademisk BK | Københavns Idrætspark, Copenhagen | 6,000 | |
| 1916 | 12 November 1916 | Kjøbenhavns BK (4)^{†} | 3–0 | B.93 | Københavns Idrætspark, Copenhagen | 6–7,000 | |
| 1917 | 9 December 1917 | B 1903 (1) | 3–2 (a.e.t.) | Østerbros BK^{‡} | Københavns Idrætspark, Copenhagen | 2,000 | |
| 1918 | 17 November 1918 | B.93 (3) | 5–2 | BK Frem | Københavns Idrætspark, Copenhagen | 6–10,000 | |
| 1919 | 16 November 1919 | B 1903 (2)^{†} | 4–2 | BK Frem | Københavns Idrætspark, Copenhagen | 5,000 | |
| 1920 | 7 November 1920 | B 1903 (3) | 3–2 | B.93 | Københavns Idrætspark, Copenhagen | 9,000 | |
| 1921 | 4 December 1921 | B 1903 (4) | 2–1 (a.e.t.) | B.93 | Københavns Idrætspark, Copenhagen | 9,000 | |
| 1922 | 22 October 1922 | B.93 (4) | 4–0 | BK Frem | Københavns Idrætspark, Copenhagen | 14–15,000 | |
| 1923 | 11 November 1923 | Kjøbenhavns BK (5) | 4–1 | Østerbros BK^{‡} | Københavns Idrætspark, Copenhagen | —N/a | |
| 1924 | 2 November 1924 | B 1903 (5) | 3–1 | BK Frem | Københavns Idrætspark, Copenhagen | 12,000 | |
| 1925 | 8 November 1925 | BK Frem (1) | 5–1 | Akademisk BK | Københavns Idrætspark, Copenhagen | 15,000 | |
| 1926 | 7 November 1926 | B.93 (5)^{†} | 5–1 | Kjøbenhavns BK | Københavns Idrætspark, Copenhagen | 13,000 | |
| 1927 | 6 November 1927 | BK Frem (2) | 3–2 | B.93 | Københavns Idrætspark, Copenhagen | 11,000 | |
| 1928 | 4 November 1928 | B 1903 (6) | 3–2 | B.93 | Københavns Idrætspark, Copenhagen | 12,000 | |
| 1929 | 27 October 1929 | B.93 (6)^{†} | 3–2 | B 1903 | Københavns Idrætspark, Copenhagen | 15,000 | |
| 1930 | 2 November 1930 | B.93 (7) | 2–2 | BK Frem | Københavns Idrætspark, Copenhagen | 18–20,000 | |
| 1930 (R) | 23 November 1930 | B.93 (7) | 4–3 | BK Frem | Københavns Idrætspark, Copenhagen | 20,000 | |
| 1931 | 1 November 1931 | B.93 (8)^{†} | 5–1 | Akademisk BK | Københavns Idrætspark, Copenhagen | 16,000 | |
| 1932 | 6 November 1932 | B.93 (9) | 2–1 | Kjøbenhavns BK | Københavns Idrætspark, Copenhagen | 16,500 | |
| 1933 | 5 November 1933 | Kjøbenhavns BK (6) | 3–2 | BK Fremad Amager | Københavns Idrætspark, Copenhagen | 8–10,000 | |
| 1934 | 4 November 1934 | B.93 (10) | 0–0 | BK Frem | Københavns Idrætspark, Copenhagen | 22,000 | |
| 1934 (R) | 18 November 1934 | B.93 (10) | 4–2 | BK Frem | Københavns Idrætspark, Copenhagen | 20,000 | |
| 1935 | 10 November 1935 | Hellerup IK (1) | 2–1 | B.93 | Københavns Idrætspark, Copenhagen | 17,000 | |
| 1936 | 1 November 1936 | Akademisk BK (1)^{†} | 3–1 | Kjøbenhavns BK | Københavns Idrætspark, Copenhagen | —N/a | |
| 1937 | 31 October 1937 | B 1903 (7)^{†} | 2–1 | Kjøbenhavns BK | Københavns Idrætspark, Copenhagen | 28,000 | |
| 1938 | 30 October 1938 | BK Frem (3) | 2–2 | Hellerup IK | Københavns Idrætspark, Copenhagen | 18,500 | |
| 1938 (R) | 11 December 1938 | BK Frem (3) | 2–0 | Hellerup IK | Københavns Idrætspark, Copenhagen | 10,000 | |
| 1939 | 19 November 1939 | B.93 (11) | 2–1 | BK Frem | Københavns Idrætspark, Copenhagen | 14–16,000 | |
| 1940 | 3 November 1940 | BK Frem (4)^{†} | 4–3 | Kjøbenhavns BK | Københavns Idrætspark, Copenhagen | 14,500 | |
| 1941 | 2 November 1941 | B.93 (12)^{†} | 1–0 | Kjøbenhavns BK | Københavns Idrætspark, Copenhagen | 13,000 | |
| 1942 | 8 November 1942 | Akademisk BK (2)^{†} | 3–1 | B.93 | Københavns Idrætspark, Copenhagen | 27,000 | |
| 1943 | 21 April 1944 | BK Frem (5)^{†} | 3–2 | B.93 | Københavns Idrætspark, Copenhagen | 37,000 | |
| 1944 | 5 November 1944 | Akademisk BK (3)^{†} | 3–1 | BK Frem | Københavns Idrætspark, Copenhagen | 32,000 | |
| 1945 | 4 November 1945 | Akademisk BK (4) | 1–0 | B.93 | Københavns Idrætspark, Copenhagen | 21,000 | |
| 1946 | 3 November 1946 | BK Frem (6) | 7–2 | Akademisk BK | Københavns Idrætspark, Copenhagen | 26,800 | |
| 1947 | 9 November 1947 | Østerbros BK (1) | 2–1 | B 1903 | Københavns Idrætspark, Copenhagen | —N/a | |
| 1948 | 7 November 1948 | Kjøbenhavns BK (7)^{†} | 3–1 | B 1903 | Københavns Idrætspark, Copenhagen | —N/a | |
| 1949 | 29 April 1950 | Akademisk BK (5) | 1–0 | Kjøbenhavns BK | Københavns Idrætspark, Copenhagen | —N/a | |
| 1950 | 20 April 1951 | Akademisk BK (6)^{†} | 1–0 | B.93 | Københavns Idrætspark, Copenhagen | 23,700 | |
| 1951 | 26 April 1952 | Kjøbenhavns BK (8)^{‡} | 2–0 | B.93 | Københavns Idrætspark, Copenhagen | 14,600 | |
| 1952 | 22 April 1953 | BK Fremad Amager (1)^{‡} | 1–1 | Kjøbenhavns BK | Københavns Idrætspark, Copenhagen | 15,000 | |
| 1952 (R) | 25 May 1953 | BK Fremad Amager (1)^{‡} | 1–0 | Kjøbenhavns BK | Københavns Idrætspark, Copenhagen | 15,000 | |
| 1953 | 13 December 1953 | B.93 (13) | 2–1 | Akademisk BK | Københavns Idrætspark, Copenhagen | 10,200 | |

== Results by team ==
Teams shown in italics are no longer in existence. B.93 won the first and last edition, won the most final matches and lost the largest number of final matches.

| Club | Wins | First final won | Last final won | Runners-up | Last final lost | Total final appearances |
|---|---|---|---|---|---|---|
| B.93 | 13 | 1910 | 1953 | 11 | 1951 | 24 |
| Kjøbenhavns BK | 8 | 1912 | 1951 | 9 | 1952 | 17 |
| B 1903 | 7 | 1917 | 1937 | 4 | 1948 | 11 |
| BK Frem | 6 | 1925 | 1946 | 9 | 1944 | 15 |
| Akademisk BK | 6 | 1936 | 1950 | 6 | 1953 | 12 |
| Østerbros BK | 1 | 1947 | 1947 | 2 | 1923 | 3 |
| BK Fremad Amager | 1 | 1952 | 1952 | 1 | 1933 | 2 |
| Hellerup IK | 1 | 1935 | 1935 | 1 | 1938 | 2 |
| BK Velo | 1 | 1911 | 1911 | 0 | — | 1 |
| BK Viktoria | 0 | — | — | 1 | 1911 | 1 |
