= Kay Madsen =

Danish footballer (1902–1979)

Personal information
- Date of birth: 27 November 1902
- Date of death: 6 June 1979 (aged 76)

International career
| Years | Team | Apps | (Gls) |
| 1928 | Denmark | 1 | (0) |

Kay Madsen (27 November 1902 – 6 June 1979) was a Danish footballer. He played in one match for the Denmark national football team against Germany in 1928 that resulted in a 2-1 victory for Germany.
