= Poul Graae =

Danish footballer and journalist (1899–1976)

Poul Gomme Graae (20 October 1899 – 10 August 1976) was a Danish football player and journalist.

He played as a goalkeeper for AGF and Kjøbenhavns Boldklub, winning the 1922 and 1925 Danish championships with the latter. He represented the Denmark national football team five times from the debut in October 1920 to September 1925. He was selected for the Danish team at the 1920 Summer Olympics, but spent the tournament as an unused reserve for Sophus Hansen.

He was chief editor of Politiken from 1941 to 1959.
