= Svend Hansen (footballer, born 1906) =

Danish footballer

Personal information
- Date of birth: 5 July 1906
- Date of death: 25 July 1958 (aged 52)

International career
Years	Team	Apps	(Gls)
1928	Denmark	3	(0)

Svend Hansen (5 July 1906 – 25 July 1958) was a Danish footballer. He played in three matches for the Denmark national football team in 1928.
