= Axel Pilmark =

Danish footballer (1925-2009)

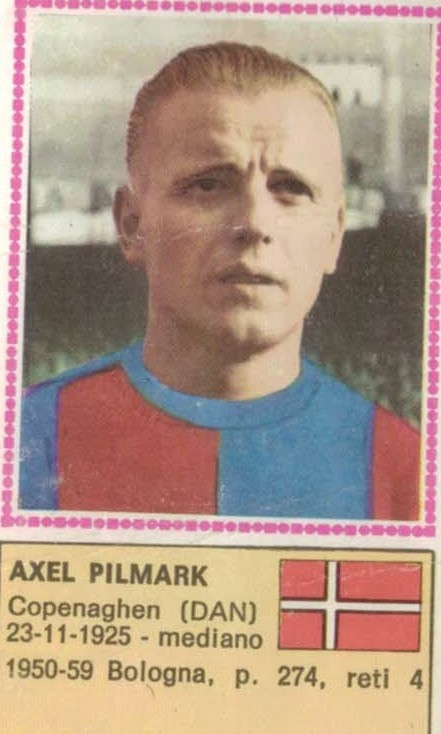

Personal information
- Date of birth: 23 November 1925
- Date of death: 13 July 2009 (aged 83)
- Position: Midfielder

Senior career*
Years	Team	Apps	(Gls)
- KB
1950–1960	Bologna FC	274	(4)

International career
1947	Denmark U23	1	(0)
1947–1950	Denmark	18	(1)
Medal record
Men's Football
Bronze medal – third place	1948 London	Team competition
- * Club domestic league appearances and goals

Axel "Pap" Pilmark (23 November 1925 – 13 July 2009) was a Danish footballer, who played as an amateur for Kjøbenhavns Boldklub (KB) and professionally for Italian club Bologna FC. He played 18 games and scored one goal for the Denmark national football team, and won a bronze medal at the 1948 Summer Olympics.

== Biography ==
Axel Pilmar is one of the greatest technicians in Danish football history, able to the strike the ball with extreme precision. He played as a wing half-back, and formed a strong partnership with Ivan Jensen in the Danish national team. He made his international debut in 1947, and was a part of the Danish team that won a bronze medal at the 1948 Summer Olympics. He stayed in the Danish team until 1950, when he signed a professional contract and was banned from the amateur-only Danish football.

Many of his 1948 Olympic teammates were already professional in Italian football, with Karl Aage Hansen and Jørgen Leschly Sørensen at Atalanta Bergamo and Ivan Jensen at Bologna FC all trying to persuade Pilmark to join their team. In the end, Pilmark signed with Bologna FC, recreating his former international partnership with Ivan Jensen. Axel Pilmark's passing became the main attacking strength, setting up chances for the Bologna forwards, and Jensen later declared Pilmark the best Serie A half-back at the time. Pilmark stayed in Bologna for 10 seasons, playing 274 league games for the team.

== Honours ==
Individual

- Serie A Team of The Year: 1951, 1952, 1957
