= Erik Glümer =

Danish footballer (1915-1960)

Personal information
- Date of birth: 20 September 1915
- Date of death: 29 September 1960 (aged 45)

International career
Years	Team	Apps	(Gls)
1938–1940	Denmark	3	(0)

Erik Glümer (20 September 1915 – 29 September 1960) was a Danish footballer. He played in three matches for the Denmark national football team from 1938 to 1940.
