= 1940–41 Danish War Tournament =

Danish War Tournament
- Season: 1940–41
- Champions: Boldklubben Frem

Statistics of Danish War Tournament in the 1940/1941 season.

== Series 1 ==
Pos	Team	Pld	W	D	L	GF	GA	GD	Pts
1	Boldklubben 1913	12	10	0	2	34	10	+24	20
2	Aalborg Boldspilklub	12	6	4	2	21	12	+9	16
3	Vejen SF	12	6	2	4	41	21	+20	14
4	Boldklubben 1909	12	6	2	4	35	21	+14	14
5	Aarhus Gymnastikforening	12	5	3	4	16	35	−19	13
6	Vejle Boldklub	12	1	3	8	21	37	−16	5
7	AIA	12	0	2	10	11	43	−32	2

== Series 2 ==
Pos	Team	Pld	W	D	L	GF	GA	GD	Pts
1	Østerbros Boldklub	12	10	0	2	57	22	+35	20
2	KFUM	12	10	0	2	50	22	+28	20
3	Helsingør IF	12	6	0	6	40	36	+4	12
4	Nakskov	12	6	0	6	31	33	−2	12
5	Boldklubben 1908	12	4	0	8	22	39	−17	8
6	B 1901	12	3	0	9	27	39	−12	6
7	Korsør Boldklub	12	3	0	9	20	56	−36	6

== Series 3 ==
Pos	Team	Pld	W	D	L	GF	GA	GD	Pts
1	Boldklubben Frem	14	9	2	3	41	21	+20	20
2	Boldklubben 1903	14	8	2	4	43	30	+13	18
3	Fremad Amager	14	7	4	3	40	28	+12	18
4	Boldklubben af 1893	14	6	5	3	30	25	+5	17
5	Kjøbenhavns Boldklub	14	6	1	7	31	41	−10	13
6	Køge BK	14	5	1	8	42	42	0	11
7	Akademisk Boldklub	14	4	3	7	33	40	−7	11
8	Hellerup IK	14	1	2	11	18	51	−33	4

== Quarterfinals ==
- Boldklubben 1913 3-4 Fremad Amager
- Boldklubben af 1893 0-4 KFUM
- Aalborg Boldspilklub 2-5 Boldklubben Frem
- Boldklubben 1903 3-3 Østerbros Boldklub
  - Boldklubben 1903 was awarded winner by lot.

== Semifinals ==
- Boldklubben 1903 1-2 Fremad Amager
- KFUM 1-2 Boldklubben Frem

== Final ==
- Fremad Amager 2-4 Boldklubben Frem
