= Michael Rohde (footballer) =

Danish footballer (1894-1979)

Michael "Mikkel" Laurits Rohde (3 March 1894 – 5 February 1979) was a Danish amateur football (soccer) player, who played 40 matches and scored 22 goals for the Danish national team from 1915 to 1931, and competed at the 1920 Summer Olympics. In June 1931 he beat Poul "Tist" Nielsen's record from 1925, as Rohde became the first Dane to play 39 international games. By his international retirement in September 1931, he had played 40 international games, a record broken by Fritz Tarp in September 1932. Rohde played for Danish amateur club B.93 throughout his entire senior career, winning three Danish championships. From 1911 to 1933, Rohde scored 254 goals in 252 matches for B 93, and he most famously scored all four goals, when B.93 beat English professional team Huddersfield FC 4-3.

== Career statistics ==
=== International ===
Appearances and goals by national team and year
National team	Year	Apps	Goals
Denmark	1915	2	2
Denmark	1916	4	5
Denmark	1917	4	2
Denmark	1918	0	0
Denmark	1919	2	2
Denmark	1920	3	1
Denmark	1921	1	0
Denmark	1922	4	0
Denmark	1923	0	0
Denmark	1924	0	0
Denmark	1925	2	1
Denmark	1926	4	3
Denmark	1927	5	3
Denmark	1928	2	2
Denmark	1929	3	1
Denmark	1930	0	0
Denmark	1931	4	0
Total		40	22

Scores and results list Denmark's goal tally first, score column indicates score after each Rohde goal.

List of international goals scored by Michael Rohde
No.	Date	Venue	Cap	Opponent	Score	Result	Competition	Ref.
1	19 September 1915	Idrætsparken, Copenhagen, Denmark	1	Norway	4–1	8–1	Friendly	
2	31 October 1915	Stockholm Olympic Stadium, Stockholm, Sweden	2	Sweden	2–0	2–0	Friendly	
3	25 June 1916	Frogner stadion, Oslo, Norway	4	Norway	1–0	2–0	Friendly	
4	25 June 1916	Frogner stadion, Oslo, Norway	4	Norway	2–0	2–0	Friendly	
5	15 October 1916	Idrætsparken, Copenhagen, Denmark	6	Norway	1–0	8–0	Friendly	
6	15 October 1916	Idrætsparken, Copenhagen, Denmark	6	Norway	2–0	8–0	Friendly	
7	15 October 1916	Idrætsparken, Copenhagen, Denmark	6	Norway	7–0	8–0	Friendly	
8	7 October 1917	Idrætsparken, Copenhagen, Denmark	9	Norway	1–0	12–0	Friendly	
9	7 October 1917	Idrætsparken, Copenhagen, Denmark	9	Norway	5–0	12–0	Friendly	
10	12 June 1919	Idrætsparken, Copenhagen, Denmark	12	Norway	2–1	5–1	Friendly	
11	12 June 1919	Idrætsparken, Copenhagen, Denmark	12	Norway	3–1	5–1	Friendly	
12	10 October 1920	Stockholm Olympic Stadium, Stockholm, Sweden	15	Sweden	2–0	2–0	Friendly	
13	21 June 1925	Idrætsparken, Copenhagen, Denmark	22	Norway	4–1	5–1	1924–28 Nordic Football Championship	
14	19 September 1926	Gressbanen, Oslo, Norway	25	Norway	1–0	2–2	1924–28 Nordic Football Championship	
15	19 September 1926	Gressbanen, Oslo, Norway	25	Norway	2–2	2–2	1924–28 Nordic Football Championship	
16	3 October 1926	Idrætsparken, Copenhagen, Denmark	26	Sweden	2–0	2–0	1924–28 Nordic Football Championship	
17	2 October 1927	Idrætsparken, Copenhagen, Denmark	30	Germany	1–0	3–1	Friendly	
18	2 October 1927	Idrætsparken, Copenhagen, Denmark	30	Germany	2–1	3–1	Friendly	
19	30 October 1927	Idrætsparken, Copenhagen, Denmark	31	Norway	2–1	3–1	1924–28 Nordic Football Championship	
20	17 June 1928	Ullevaal Stadion, Oslo, Norway	32	Norway	2–1	3–2	1924–28 Nordic Football Championship	
21	7 October 1928	Idrætsparken, Copenhagen, Denmark	33	Sweden	1–0	3–1	1924–28 Nordic Football Championship	
22	13 October 1929	Idrætsparken, Copenhagen, Denmark	36	Finland	8–0	8–0	1929–32 Nordic Football Championship	

== Honours ==
- Danish championship : 1916, 1929, 1930
