= Kjøbenhavns Boldklub =

Defunct Danish football club

KB
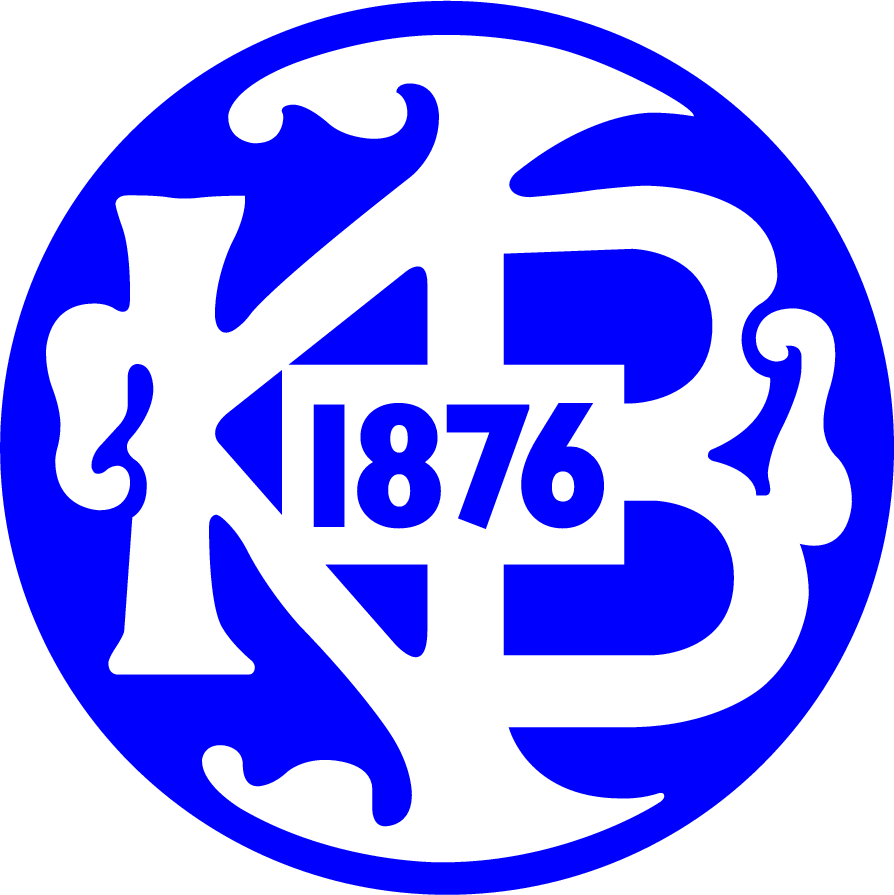
- Full name: Kjøbenhavns Boldklub
- Short name: KB
- Founded: 26 April 1876; 150 years ago
- Ground: Frederiksberg I P Opvisning, Copenhagen
- Chairman: Niels-Christian Holmstrøm
- Manager: Niels Sørensen
- League: DBU Copenhagen Serie 1
- Website: www.kb-boldklub.dk
Home colours	Away colours

Kjøbenhavns Boldklub (known simply as KB) is a Danish professional multi-sports club based in Copenhagen. The club was founded on 26 April 1876 on the grassy fields in outer Copenhagen which later became Fælledparken. Tennis has been played since 1883. The club hosted, in 1921, one of the early tennis majors: the World Covered Court Championships, won by William Laurentz that year. Today, along with the sports already mentioned, the club also has facilities for badminton, swimming and pétanque.

Football and cricket has been played in KB since 1878, meaning that KB's football team was the first club on continental Europe and it went on to become one of the most successful clubs in Denmark, winning 15 Danish championship titles from 1913 to 1980. In 1991, KB and B 1903 merged their professional football teams and formed F.C. Copenhagen.

== Logo ==
KB's logo is designed by architect and designer Thorvald Bindesbøll (1846–1908). Bindesbøll also designed the Carlsberg logo, and KB's logo is believed to be sponsored by Carlsberg.

== History ==
KB was founded as a result of Copenhageners' burgeoning interest in sport, which increased significantly throughout the second half of the 1800s. In particular, ball games such as long-ball, sting-ball and round-ball were popular in the capital, and when the Copenhagen Municipality demolished the ramparts and tore down the city gates in 1852, the Copenhageners found it easier to search out for common areas to practice sports. The club's official four founders were printer F. V. Levison, treasurer August Nielsen, and wholesalers Carl Møller and E. Selmer. Among the co-founders was also Frederik Markmann, who later became the first chairman of the Danish Football Association (DBU), which was founded in May 1889.

=== Football ===
Football was added to the club's programme on 24 October 1878, making it the oldest association football club in the world outside of the British Isles and often cited as the oldest football club on continental Europe, although its on the Danish archipelago. The first advertised games were scheduled to be held in a military exercise ground ("Exercerplads") near Rosenborg Castle on 5 January 1879 (at 11am). Nine months later, on 7 September 1879, the first-ever football match in Denmark was held in Eremitagen in Klampenborg, where Birkerød Kostskole Boldklub faced KB's juniors, with the Birkerød school students team winning 3–0. Other sources claim this match was actually held at Rosenborg's Exercerplads on 16 December 1883.

In 1888, KB, which was by far the leading club of the time, organized the first Danish football tournament in 1888, which was attended by 15 clubs and bore the official name "Medaille Fodbold-Konkurrencen i 1888". KB were the pre-tournament favourites and lived up to it by comfortably winning the tournament, beating BK Haabet in the final on 29 April 1888 with a resounding 14–0 victory, scoring 40 goals in total and not conceding a single one. KB's dominance and undisputed status as Denmark's best football club was also reflected in the fact that the club paid a significant part of the total expenses for the completion of the tournament.

In the first years of football in Denmark, the sport was played in places such as Rosenborg's Exercerplads and Eremitagen, but this changed in 1893, when KB become the first Danish club to get its own football field, being quickly followed up by AB, BK Frem and B93, who also got their own tracks. In 1893, KB gathered its activities in Frederiksberg (where Forum Copenhagen is located today), where surrounded by 10 tennis courts was the larger court Granen (K.B.'s Skt. Markus), which in 1910 was the home ground for Denmark's first international football match under DBU auspices, a 2–1 win over England Amateurs.

The Danish Football Association (DBU) was founded by Frederik Markmann in May 1889, a former cricket and tennis player who, among other things, had been a co-founder and chairman of KB. In the same year, DBU organized the first edition of Fodboldturneringen, which was held between 1889 and 1903, with KB winning on four occasions, including back-to-back titles in 1896–97 and 1897–98. The Fodboldturneringen was the forerunner for the Danish National Football Tournament, which was held for the first time in 1912–13, and ended with a KB triumph, thus becoming the first Danish champions.

In 1908, when Denmark made their international debut at the Olympic Games, the club provided seven players to the 17-man squad, three defenders (the Middelboe brothers, Einar, Nils and team captain Kristian), three forwards (Oskar Nielsen, Rasmussen and Wolfhagen) and the team's goalkeeper Ludvig Drescher, of which six started in the final against Great Britain in a 0–2 loss. They were the fundamental players behind Denmark's silver medal campaign, with Nils Middelboe scoring Denmark's first-ever official goal in a 9–0 victory over France on 19 October 1908, while Vilhelm Wolfhagen scored 8 goals in just two matches, a poker in both the quarter and the semi-finals.

The club began to spread its activities beyond Copenhagen. Among other things, they moved the football team into the Københavns Idrætspark (today's Parken Stadium) on Østerbro, which was inaugurated on 25 May 1911 with a football match between a combined team from B93 and KB against the English side Sheffield Wednesday, ending in a 3–2 to the latter. Later in the year, an audience record for a football match in Denmark was set with 11,233 spectators when a selected Copenhagen team with six KB players met the Scottish champion Rangers FC from Glasgow, who won by the score of 4–1. This attendance record only lasted three years, until Denmark met England Amateurs on 5 June 1914 and won 3–0 in front of 18,500 spectators in Idrætspark. But in the early 1990s, KB and Boldklubben 1903 were in financial trouble. At the same time, new Danish giants and local rivals Brøndby won 5 championships in 7 seasons. Moreover, with Parken Stadium soon finished, both clubs acted the merger on 1 July 1992.

Denmark national football team all-time top scorer Poul Nielsen (1891–1962) played for KB during all of his career. One of Denmark's all-time greatest players, Michael Laudrup, played for the club from 1980 to 1982 before rejoining Brøndby IF. Legendary striker Preben Elkjær played for KB for one season as a trainee (1973–1974), while Nicklas Bendtner, who in 2019 played for FCK, was a former trainee at KB between the years of 2002 and 2004.

Since November 2018, KB is a member of the Club of Pioneers.

=== Tennis ===
In 1883, tennis became part of the club's activities, first at Rosenborg's Exercerplads, while the first actual tennis courts were built in 1889 by KB in Dronningens Mølle at Rosenkrantz Bastion (where Østerport station is today). In the late 19th century, KB established a large tennis facility called Porcelainsfabrik, which in 1902 laid the courts for the first major international tournament in Denmark. At one point in the 1920s, the club had more than 50 tennis courts, but as of 2021, the number has been reduced to just under 40. For a few years around World War I (1913 and 1919–23), the International Tennis Federation held the World Covered Court Championships, and in 1921 they took place in KB's first tennis hall at Pile Allé in Frederiksberg, and KB won the tournament.

=== Honours ===
Danish championship

- Champions (15) : 1912–13, 1913–14, 1916–17, 1917–18, 1921–22, 1924–25, 1931–32, 1939–40, 1947–48, 1948–49, 1949–50, 1952–53, 1968, 1974, 1980

Danish Cup

- Winners (1): 1968–69
- Runners-up (5): 1957–58, 1960–61, 1964–65, 1965–66, 1983–84
- 53 seasons in the Highest Danish League
- 6 seasons in the Second Highest Danish League
- 1 season in the Third Highest Danish League

== Notable players ==
- Nils Middelboe
- Vilhelm Wolfhagen
- Poul Nielsen
- Preben Elkjær
- Michael Laudrup
- Nicklas Bendtner

=== 50 or more appearances ===
All players who have played in 50 or more such matches or played international football during their time at the club are listed below. Players are listed according to the date of their first professional contract signed with the club. Appearances and goals are for first-team competitive matches only; wartime matches are excluded, but substitute appearances are included.

Poul Nielsen holds both the appearance and goalscoring records, with 201 appearances and 276 goals between 1907 and 1927. Torben Piechnik is the only other player with over 100 appearances, with 175 between 1980 and 1987.

Name	Nationality	Position	Kjøbenhavns Boldklub career	Appearances	Goals
Ludvig Drescher	Denmark	Goalkeeper	1897–1917	Unknown	
Kristian Middelboe	Denmark	Defender	1897–1921	Unknown	
Oskar Nørland	Denmark	Striker	1898–1918	Unknown	
Bjørn Rasmussen	Denmark	Striker	1901–1921	Unknown	
Nils Middelboe	Denmark	Midfielder	1903–1913	Unknown	
Ivar Lykke	Denmark	Defender	1905–1925	Unknown	
Svend Aage Castella	Denmark	Midfielder	1906–1926	Unknown	
Poul Nielsen	Denmark	Striker	1907–1927	201	276
Christian Morville	Denmark	Midfielder	1907–1913 1916–1931	Unknown	
Steen Steensen Blicher	Denmark	Defender	1915–1935	Unknown	
Poul Graae	Denmark	Goalkeeper	1915–1925	Unknown	
Alf Olsen	Denmark	Striker	1915–1923	Unknown	
Vilhelm Wolfhagen	Denmark	Striker	1915–1929	Unknown	
Eigil Nielsen	Denmark	Goalkeeper	1934–1954	Unknown	
Dion Ørnvold	Denmark	Midfielder	1937–1951	Unknown	
Niels Bennike	Denmark	Midfielder	1943–1950	Unknown	
Per Jensen	Denmark	Striker	1947–1953	Unknown	
Jørn Sørensen	Denmark	Striker	1958–1961	Unknown	
Niels-Christian Holmstrøm	Denmark	Striker	1967–1969 1971–1974	Unknown	
Finn Laudrup	Denmark	Striker	1976–1980	Unknown	
Ole Qvist	Denmark	Goalkeeper	1979–1986	39	0
Torben Piechnik	Denmark	Defender	1980–1987	175	Unknown
Prince Nana Takyi	Ghana	Striker	2001–2003	27	3
Jamil Fearrington	Denmark	Defender	2004–2006 2006–2007	76	12

=== International players ===
In the first official game of the Denmark national football team on 19 October 1908, at the 1908 Summer Olympics, five players represented KB in that team, including team captain Kristian Middelboe. Since then, a total 75 players have represented KB in the senior Denmark national team.

Listed according to the year of debut.

- 1900s: Ludvig Drescher (1908), Kristian Middelboe (1908), Nils Middelboe (1908), Vilhelm Wolfhagen (1908), Oskar Nørland (1908), Bjørn Rasmussen (1908)
- 1910s: Poul 'Tist' Nielsen (1910), Ivar Lykke (1911), Svend Aage Castella (1911), Kristian Gyldenstein (1911), Christian Morville (1912), Georg Brysting (1912), Alf Olsen (1917), Steen Steensen Blicher (1918), Valdemar Laursen (1918)
- 1920s: Leo Dannin (1920), Poul Graae (1920), Axel V. Preno (1922), Svend Aage Remtoft (1923), Aage Jørgensen (1923), Wilhelm Nielsen (1925), Erik Eriksen (1929)
- 1930s: Henning Jensen (1931), Oscar Jørgensen (1932), Georg Taarup (1932), Eli Larsen (1933), Hans Christensen (1934), Egon Andersen (1936), Helge Jørgensen (1937), Jørgen Iversen (1938), John Nielsen (1938), Erik Glümer (1938)
- 1940s: Harald Lyngsaa (1940), Eigil Nielsen (1940), Jørn Jegsen (1943), Niels Bennike (1945), Gustaf Pålsson (1945), Jørgen W. Hansen (1947), Dion Ørnvold (1947), Axel Pilmark (1947), Erik Køppen (1949)
- 1950s: Arnold Olsen (1950), Erik Hansen (1951), Jørgen Johansen (1952), Martin Kristensen (1952), Per Jensen (1952), Vagn Birkeland (1954), Jens Torstensen (1956), Finn Alfred Hansen (1957), Jørn Sørensen (1958), Per Funch Jensen (1959), Arne Karlsen (1959)
- 1960s: Bent Krog (1961), Ole Sørensen (1961), Henning Helbrandt (1961), Nils Jensen (1961), Gert Hansen (1961), Eyvind Clausen (1962), Niels Møller (1966), Kurt Præst (1968), Niels-Christian Holmstrøm (1968)
- 1970s: Flemming Pedersen (1970), Niels Hagenau (1971), Eigil Nielsen (1971), Niels Sørensen (1974), Anders Sørensen (1974), Karl Aage Skouborg (1974), Torsten Andersen (1977), Klaus Nørregaard (1977), Henrik Agerbeck (1978), Ole Højgaard (1979), Finn Laudrup (1979), Ole Qvist (1979), Palle Hansen (1979)
- 1980s: Henrik Eigenbrod (1981)
