= Svend Jensen =

Danish footballer (1905–1979)

Personal information
- Full name: Svend Aage Julius Jensen
- Date of birth: 6 October 1905
- Date of death: 25 April 1979 (aged 73)
- Height: 1.95 m (6 ft 5 in)
- Position: Goalkeeper

Senior career*
Years	Team	Apps	(Gls)
1925–1940	B 93	255	(0)

International career
1927–1939	Denmark	41	(0)
- * Club domestic league appearances and goals

Svend Aage Julius Jensen (6 October 1905 – 25 April 1979) was a Danish football (soccer) player, who played 41 games for the Denmark national football team. Born in Copenhagen, he played his entire career as a goalkeeper for local club B 93. He was a tall and strong goalkeeper, with great tactical sense and positioning. He made his national team debut in May 1927, and went on to play 41 games until October 1939. His greatest individual performance for the Denmark national football team came in the so-called Battle of Breslau, a 1937 game lost 0–8 to the Germany national football team. Without Svend Jensen, it is said Germany would have scored twice as many goals.

Svend Jensen died in February 1979, while living at Østerbro in Copenhagen.
