= 1926–27 KBUs Mesterskabsrække =

KBUs Mesterskabsrække
- Season: 1926–27
- Dates: 29 August 1926 – 8 May 1927 (regular season); 16 June 1927 (play-offs)
- Champions: B.93 (6th title)
- Relegated: none
- Matches: 30
- Goals: 149 (4.97 per match)
- Top goalscorer: Pauli Jørgensen (10 goals)
- Biggest home win: BK Frem 11–2 BK Fremad Amager (20 March 1927)
- Biggest away win: BK Fremad Amager 2–8 B.93 (21 November 1926)
- Highest scoring: BK Frem 11–2 BK Fremad Amager (20 March 1927)
- Total number of matches and goals played does not include the promotion/relegation play-offs.

The 1926–27 KBUs Mesterskabsrække was the 39th season of the Copenhagen Football Championship since its establishment in 1889, and the 25th under the administration of Kjøbenhavns Boldspil-Union (KBU). The season was launched with two league matches on 29 August 1926 and the final round of regular league fixtures were played on 8 May 1927 with two matches. Boldklubben 1903 were the defending league champions from the 1925–26 KBUs season. The winner of the league would automatically qualify for the national championship final of the 1926–27 Landsfodboldturneringen played at the end of the regular season. All six teams in the league, including the winner of the 1926–27 KBUs A-række, also participated in the inaugural season of the new Danish Championship play-off structure, the 1927–28 Danmarksmesterskabsturneringen i Fodbold. The same six teams including both the winners and runners-up of the second-tier league, 1926–27 KBUs A-række automatically qualified for the 1927 edition of KBUs Pokalturnering.

The winner of the Copenhagen FA first-tier football league were B.93, with this being their sixth KBU league title, and during the fall season of 1926, the team also secured the championship trophy of the 1926 KBUs Pokalturnering, securing a double. Pauli Jørgensen from BK Frem became the league's top goalscorer with 10 goals. BK Fremad Amager finished in the last place of the league in its debuting season of Copenhagen FA's primary football competition, a year after the club's promotion last season from the second Copenhagen FA-tier, 1925–26 KBUs A-række, but managed to win the first promotion/relegation play-off match against the 1926–27 KBUs A-række winner, Handelsstandens BK, securing their spot in the next season of KBUs Mesterskabsrække as the league's extraordinary participant.

== Season summary ==
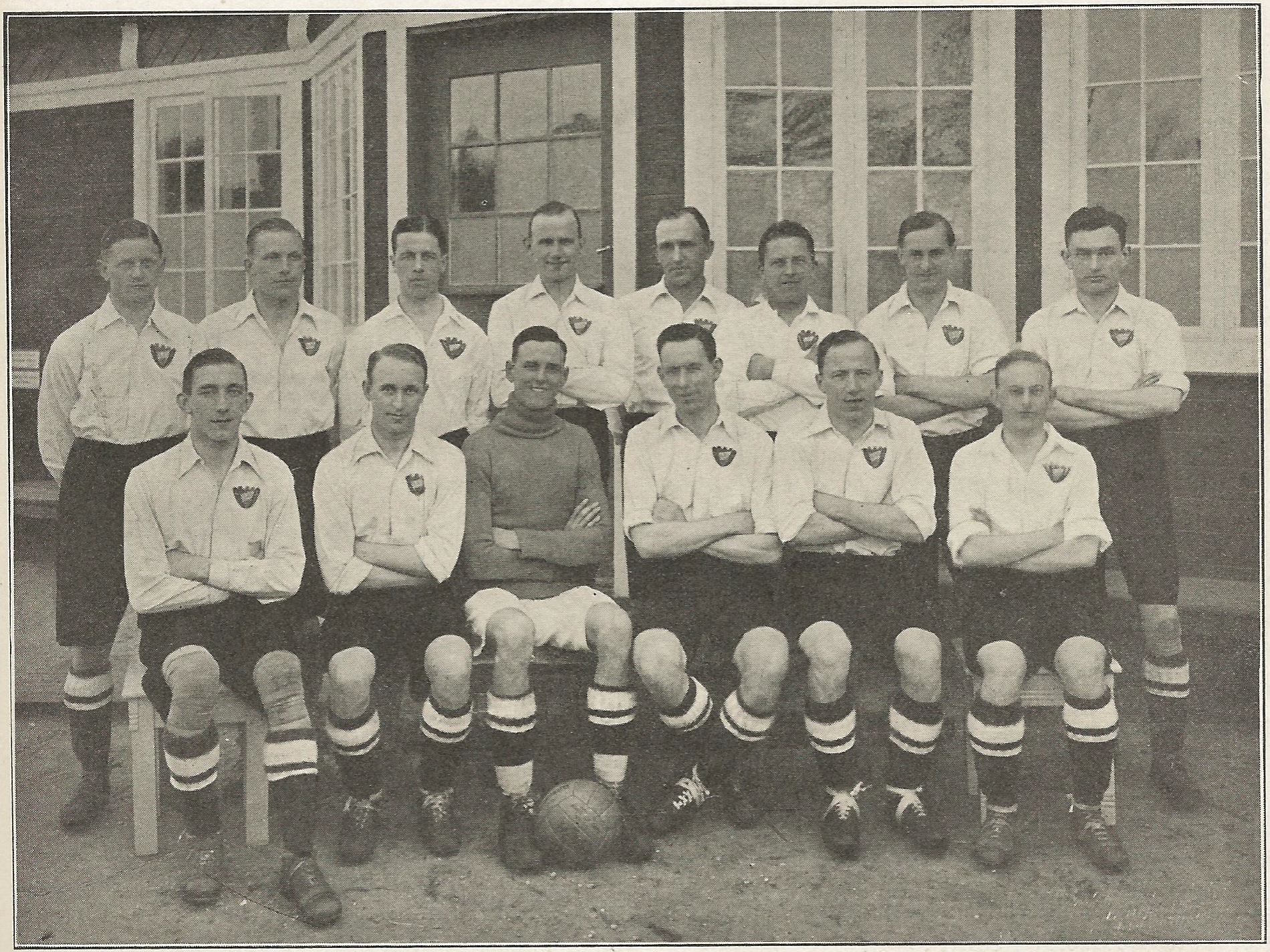
Regular league line-up including reserves of B.93, the winners of the 1926/27-season of KBUs Mesterskabsrække. Back row (standing from left to right): Paul Offenbach, Svend Petersen, William Gram, Georg Hansen, Anthon Olsen, Michael Rohde, Magnus Simonsen, Helge Scharff. Front row (sitting from left to right): Poul Zølck, Fritz Tarp, Svend Jensen, Charles Jensen, Poul Jensen, Leo Hansen. Missing footballer from the line-up: Knud Andersen.

The match schedule for the league's fall season was published on 21 August 1926 by the Copenhagen FA, one week before the first league matches. The season was launched on 28 August 1926 with two matches both played at Københavns Idrætspark — BK Fremad Amager against BK Frem and B 1903 against B.93. The game between BK Fremad Amager and BK Frem was the first official match in the local derby between the two rival working class teams, which was eventually won by the Amager-based club with the score 6–3. The Sundby-based club's squad fielded Bernhard Andersen and Knud Kastrup, who a few years earlier both were playing for BK Frem, while Harald Ahrensberg originally played for BK Borup and Otto Larsen, who last season had been playing for B 1908 and even earlier BK Frem. BK Frem's squad consisted of players such as Niels Hansen and Svend Hansen, who in the previous season had played for Handelsstandens BK, Knud Christoffersen, who had arrived at the Valby-based club from KFUMs BK, and Kay Madsen, who had previously played from BK Borup. The match between the same two teams, BK Fremad Amager and BK Frem, in the spring season on 20 March 1927 was on the other hand won by BK Frem with the score 11–2, which became the highest scoring during the entire season. Kjøbenhavns BK continues their years long first team policy of acquire players from other Fælled-based clubs and only fielding a few players, that had played on the club's youth teams.

BK Fremad Amager finished in the last place of the league in its debuting season of the Copenhagen Football Championship, which qualified the team to the promotion/relegation play-offs. The first play-off match was scheduled to take place on 16 June 1927, more than six weeks after the team's last league match on 1 May 1927. As preparation for the play-off match against the 1926–27 KBUs A-række winner, Handelsstandens BK, the club played several friendlies, which included matches against Frederiksborg IF on 18 May at Sundby Idrætspark (lost 2–3), against a selected team from Frederiksberg Boldspil-Union (FBU) on 27 May at Frederiksberg Idrætspark (lost 2–3), against a selected Amager team on 1 June (won 7–1) and against a selected team from Valby Boldspil-Union (VBU) on 10 June at Sundby Idrætspark (lost 7–5).

== League table ==
A total of six teams were contesting the league, including 5 sides from the 1925–26 season and one promoted from the 1925–26 KBUs A-række. Every team played two games against each other team, one at home and one away. Teams received two points for a win and one point for a draw. If two or more teams were tied on points, places were determined by goal average. The team with the most points were crowned champions. The five regular teams (Danish: ordinære deltagere); B.93, B 1903, Akademisk BK, BK Frem and Kjøbenhavns BK, could basically not be relegated, while the sixth team with the status as an extraordinary participant (Danish: ekstraordinær deltager); BK Fremad Amager had to finish on the 5th place or higher in the final table to avoid qualifying for the promotion/relegation play-off match (referred to as Kvalifikationskamp by the Copenhagen FA) against the winner of KBUs second-tier league for a spot in the next season as the league's extraordinary participant.

| Pos | Team | Pld | W | D | L | GF | GA | GR | Pts | Promotion, qualification or relegation |
|---|---|---|---|---|---|---|---|---|---|---|
| 1 | B.93 (C) | 10 | 9 | 0 | 1 | 32 | 9 | 3.556 | 18 | Qualification for the 1926–27 Landsfodboldturneringen final & 1927–28 Danmarksmesterskabsturneringen |
| 2 | B 1903 | 10 | 6 | 0 | 4 | 25 | 13 | 1.923 | 12 | Qualification for the 1927–28 Danmarksmesterskabsturneringen |
| 3 | Akademisk BK | 10 | 4 | 1 | 5 | 23 | 25 | 0.920 | 9 | Qualification for the 1927–28 Danmarksmesterskabsturneringen |
| 4 | BK Frem | 10 | 4 | 0 | 6 | 29 | 29 | 1.000 | 8 | Qualification for the 1927–28 Danmarksmesterskabsturneringen |
| 5 | Kjøbenhavns BK | 10 | 3 | 1 | 6 | 17 | 29 | 0.586 | 7 | Qualification for the 1927–28 Danmarksmesterskabsturneringen |
| 6 | BK Fremad Amager (O) | 10 | 3 | 0 | 7 | 23 | 44 | 0.523 | 6 | Qualification to the Promotion/relegation play-offs & 1927–28 Danmarksmesterskabsturneringen |

Updated to match(es) played on 21 July 2017. Source:
Rules for classification: 1) Points
(C) Champions; (O) Play-off winners

== Results ==
| Home \ Away | ABK | B93 | B03 | BKF | BFA | KBK |
|---|---|---|---|---|---|---|
| Akademisk BK | — | 0–4 | 4–1 | 1–3 | 4–1 | 2–3 |
| B.93 | 2–3 | — | 1–0 | 4–0 | 3–1 | 2–0 |
| B 1903 | 2–0 | 1–2 | — | 3–1 | 7–0 | 4–2 |
| BK Frem | 2–4 | 1–3 | 2–1 | — | 11–2 | 5–3 |
| BK Fremad Amager | 4–2 | 2–8 | 1–3 | 6–3 | — | 1–2 |
| Kjøbenhavns BK | 3–3 | 1–3 | 0–3 | 2–1 | 1–5 | — |

Updated to match(es) played on 20 January 2018. Source:
Legend: Blue = home team win; Yellow = draw; Red = away team win.
For upcoming matches, an "a" indicates there is an article about the rivalry between the two participants.

== Season statistics ==
=== Top scorers ===
BK Frem's centre forward Pauli Jørgensen became the league's top scorer with 10 goals following by Svend Petersen from B.93 and Ernst Nilsson from B 1903 with 8 goals.

| Rank | Player | Club | Goals |
|---|---|---|---|
| 1 | (Denmark) Pauli Jørgensen | BK Frem | 10 |
| 2 | (Denmark) Svend Petersen | B.93 | 8 |
| 2 | (Denmark) Ernst Nilsson | B 1903 | 8 |
| 4 | (Denmark) Carl Stoltz | BK Frem | 7 |
| 4 | (Denmark) Ernst Quick | BK Fremad Amager | 7 |
| 4 | (Denmark) Eyolf Kleven | Akademisk BK | 7 |
| 4 | (Denmark) Arne Kleven | Akademisk BK | 7 |
| 4 | (Denmark) Viggo Jørgensen | B 1903 | 7 |
| 9 | (Denmark) Michael Rohde | B.93 | 6 |
| 9 | (Denmark) Magnus Simonsen | B.93 | 6 |

Source: Idrætsbladet

=== Hat-tricks ===
| Player | For | Against | Result | Date | Ref |
|---|---|---|---|---|---|
| (Denmark) Ernst Quick | BK Fremad Amager | BK Frem | 6–3 (H) | 29 August 1926 | |
| (Denmark) Michael Rohde | B.93 | BK Frem | 3–1 (A) | 24 October 1926 | |
| (Denmark) Pauli Jørgensen | BK Frem | Akademisk BK | 3–1 (A) | 14 November 1926 | |
| (Denmark) Svend Petersen^{5} | B.93 | BK Fremad Amager | 8–2 (H) | 21 November 1926 | |
| (Denmark) Edvard Johansen | BK Frem | BK Fremad Amager | 11–2 (H) | 20 March 1927 | |
| (Denmark) Carl Stoltz^{4} | BK Frem | BK Fremad Amager | 11–2 (H) | 20 March 1927 | |

- ^{4} Player scored 4 goals
- ^{5} Player scored 5 goals

== Promotion/relegation play-offs ==
The 6th-placed team of the 1926–27 KBUs Mesterskabsrække met the winners of the 1926–27 KBUs A-række for a spot in the next season of the KBUs Mesterskabsrække as the league's extraordinary participant. The rules, that had been implemented from the beginning of the 1923–24 season, were designed so that winners of the KBUs A-række had to obtain at least three points (two points for a win, 1 point for a tie and 0 points for a loss) over the course of two play-off matches in order for the team to gain promotion. The match was played on 16 June 1927 on the main football field of Københavns Idrætspark in clear and calm weather. Handelsstandens Boldklub fielded the following players in their line-up using a 2–3–5 formation: goalkeeper and captain Karl Christiansen, defenders Kai Petersen and Kaj Dihver, midfielders Viggo Kruse, Poul Jørgensen and Frederik Wieder, forwards Ole Olsen, Ejner Jørgensen, Otto Jørgensen, Henning Nielsen and Ejner Nielsen, while BK Fremad Amager published the following line-up before the match in the same 2–3–5 formation: goalkeeper Henry Schnabelrauch, defenders Frode Marte and Otto Larsen, midfielders Valdemar Henriksen, Knud Kastrup and Knud Petersen, forwards Henrik Selchau, Alf Olsen, Ernst Quick, Harald Ahrensberg and Bernhard Vilhelm Andersen (nicknamed "Bette"). The starting line-up for the Amager-based team included four former national team players with two players actually having represented the club on a national level, with Knud Kastrup being the most recent player having played a national match 18 days earlier on 29 May 1927 away against Norway — leaving the average age of the squad much higher than that of the opponent. The first half was dominated by BK Fremad Amager, who scored four goals and Handelsstandens BK only one, while the second half was played more evenly. BK Fremad Amager won the first play-off match with the score 5–3 with all the team's five goals made by Ernst Quick and both clubs, therefore, remained in their respective tiers for the 1927/28–season — voiding the second play-off match.

16 June 1927
19:00 CEST

| BK Fremad Amager | 5 – 3 | Handelsstandens BK |
|---|---|---|
| Ernst Quick 3', 8', 25', 45', 63' | | Ole Olsen 36'; Henning Nielsen 62'; Otto Jørgensen 83' |

Københavns Idrætspark, Copenhagen
Attendance: 4,000
Referee: Lauritz Andersen (BK Velo)

| BK Fremad Amager | Handelsstandens BK |

| GK | Henry Schnabelrauch |
| DF | Frode Marte |
| DF | Otto Larsen |
| MF | Valdemar Henriksen |
| MF | Knud Kastrup |
| MF | Knud Petersen |
| FW | Henrik Selschau |
| FW | Alf Olsen |
| FW | Ernst Quick |
| FW | Harald Ahrensberg |
| FW | Bernhard Vilhelm Andersen |

| GK | Karl Christiansen (Captain) |
| DF | Kaj "Jumbe" Petersen |
| DF | Kaj Dihver |
| MF | Viggo Kruse |
| MF | Poul Jørgensen |
| MF | Frederik Wieler |
| FW | Ole Olsen |
| FW | Ejner Jørgensen |
| FW | Otto Jørgensen |
| FW | Henning Nielsen |
| FW | Ejner Nielsen |

Match rules

- 90 minutes.
- New match if tied.
- New match if win for Handelsstandens BK.
