= 1927–28 Danmarksmesterskabsturneringen =

Football tournament in Denmark without declared winner

Danmarksturneringen i fodbold 1927/28

Tournament details
- Country: Denmark
- Dates: Preliminary round: 28 August 1927 – 15 April 1928; Championship round: 4 May – 13 June 1928
- Teams: 20 (main competition)

Final positions
- Champions: none
- Runners-up: none

Tournament statistics
- Matches played: 40
- Goals scored: 244 (6.1 per match)
- Attendance: 61,450 (1,536 per match)
- Top goal scorer: Aksel (Axel) Hansen (13 goals)

The 1927–28 Danmarksmesterskabsturneringen i Fodbold was the 1st edition of the new year-long league structure for the Danish national football championship play-offs, a Danish FA-organised club football tournament between the highest ranking clubs from each of the six regional football associations. The national tournament at the top of the Danish football league system consisted of two stages, a preliminary round contested by 20 teams split into 5 groups determined by draw and distributed evenly among all regional associations, where the five winners of each group would qualify for the final championship round held at the end of the season. The clubs participating in the nationwide competition were also simultaneously contesting in their local regional league championships.

The preliminary group stage began on 28 August 1927 with four matches at Horsens, Odense, Korsør and Rønne, and ended on 15 April 1928, while the final championship group stage was played between 4 May and 13 June 1928. No clubs from the five provincial football association qualified for the final phase of the tournament, which only involved clubs from Copenhagen. Boldklubben af 1893 were the defending Danish national champions. Three teams, B.93, B 1903 and BK Frem, ended up with the same number of points in the final group stage. Although B.93 had the best goal difference, the rules for this season did not include situations in case of ties on points. The Danish FA dictated that rematches between the top three teams should be played, but B.93 and BK Frem did not want to participate, while B 1903 were not interested in winning the championship without playing an actual rematch. This was the first year of the national tournament and the Danish FA had not taken this specific situation into account, and the tournament was therefore declared without a winner.

== Season summary ==
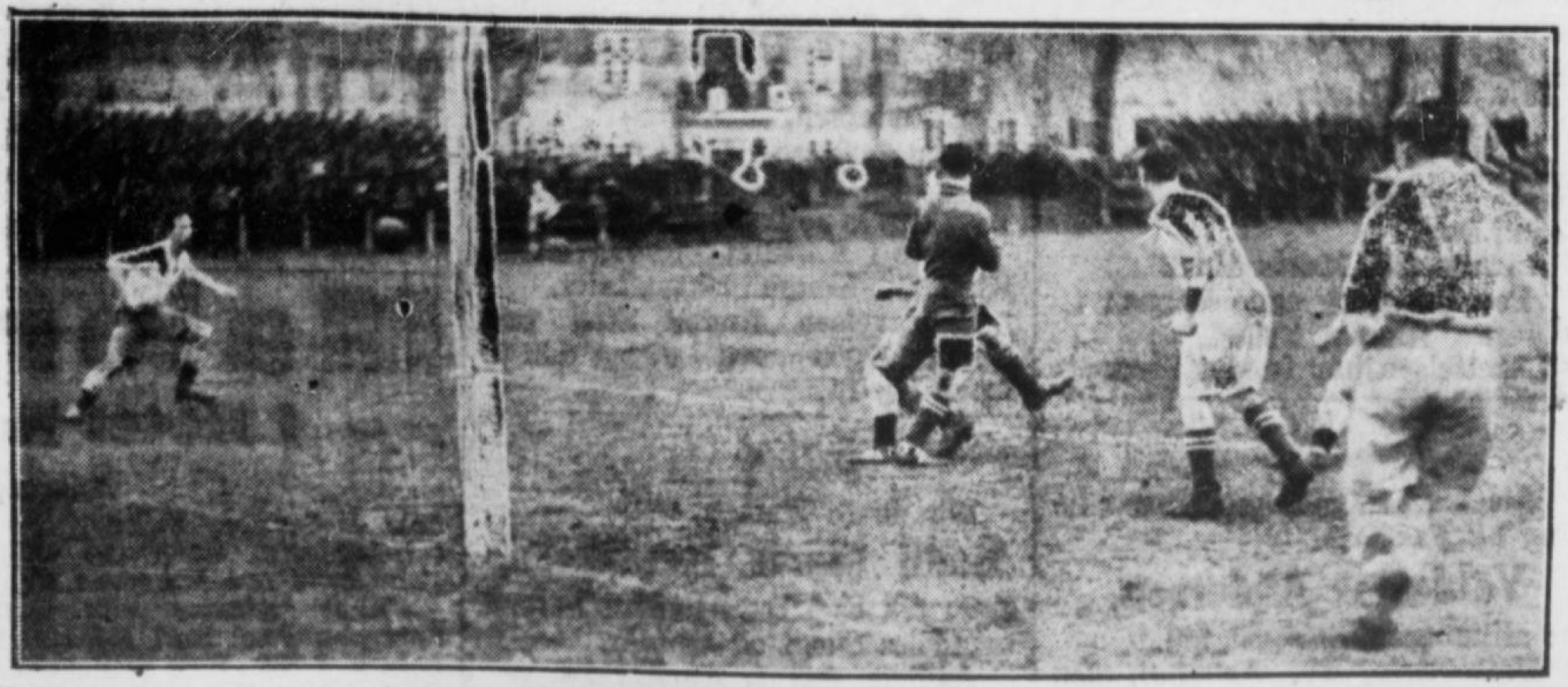
Match action ahead of the first goal of the match between Aarhus GF vs Akademisk BK on 1 April 1928.

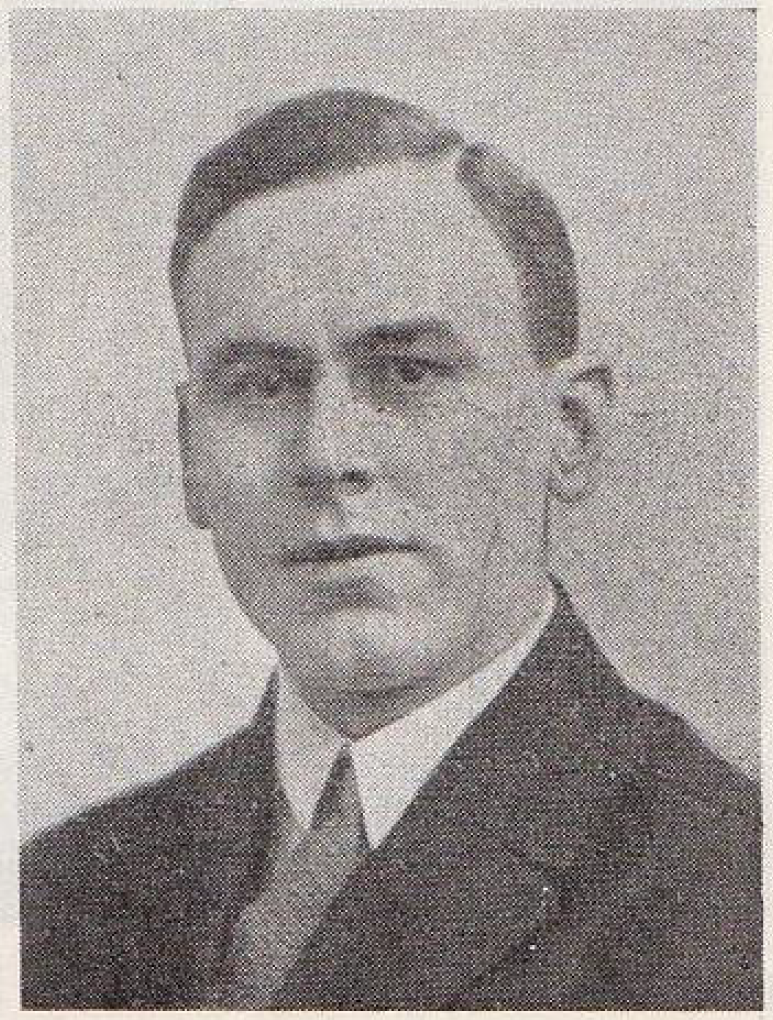
Referee Laurits "Sorte" Jørgensen of Odense BK officiated three matches in the tournament's group 3.

A nationwide tournament was established as a replacement for the Sylow-Tournament and the Danish national football championship play-off structure, known as the Landsfodboldturneringen that had existed between 1913 and 1927. The intention behind the establishment of the new national season-long league tournament was to help increase the level of play in the provincial football clubs to that of the leading clubs based in Copenhagen by having the leading clubs in the entire country play against each other. Compared to Danish football, Swedish football have had an established national league for several years, which had raised the level of football play for even smaller cities. The Danish FA determined, that structure of the tournament would initially consist of 20 teams distributed in five groups, where each team played each other one time either at home or away — each team was secured at least one match in their home town. The participants in each group were determined by draw, and distributed evenly among all the regional associations. The Fredericia Social-Demokrat argued that the Copenhagen-based clubs would likely feature their best players in the match line-ups in the preliminary round, rather than squads packed with reserve players, giving that all clubs needed to qualify for the championship round on equal terms. Qualifying to the next season's Danish championship tournament would also stimulate the clubs to work harder in the six regional championship leagues so they would finish in the top spots.

The first goal of the season, and the first goal in the new tournament, was netted after 5 minutes of play by a reserve player, centre forward Oluf "Ole" Petersen of Korsør BK, who played at their home ground in Korsør, known as Banen ved Taarnborgvej, against the reigning Danish football champions, B.93, on 28 August 1927. The first match day also saw the largest victory of the season and the largest number of goals made by one player in the same match, when B 1903 won 11–0 in their away game against Rønne BK on 28 August 1927, with three goals being scored in the first half and another eight in the second half, in front of a record crowd of 1,100 spectators at the Østergadebanen field in Rønne. The centre-forward Aksel ("Axel") Hansen, who had just recently been promoted the club's first team squad featuring several Danish national team players, scored 8 goals, which contributed greatly to him securing the tournament's topscorer title. Viborg FF's left half back and captain, Hermann Brügmann, was credited with scoring the first own goal of the tournament, in his side's 1–8 away loss to Horsens FS on 4 September 1927, when an attempt of a pass back to Viborg FF goalkeeper Aksel Laursen in the 23rd minute of the game failed completely.

Different news outlets made the claim that the players of BK Fremad Amager lost their away match i Viborg on 18 September 1927 against Viborg FF due intoxication before the match. The Copenhagen team fielded their strongest line-up, but only had three shots on target, and did not impress the media present at the match. The accusations were dismissed as unfounded and unjustified by the Danish FA after an investigation.

The first senior tournament match for Carl "Skoma'r" Hansen after his return to his former status as an amateur football player in Danish competitive football, following a 2-year mandatory suspension period for having signed a professional contract with the Scottish side Rangers F.C. (1921–1925) as the first Danish professional player abroad, was originally scheduled for the KBU league match against Kjøbenhavns BK on 23 October 1927, but the match was cancelled 20 minutes before the start due to the severe weather conditions of rain and storm. Hansen instead participated in an away match in Nykøbing Falster against B 1901 on 6 November 1927 as part of the Danish championship this season.

The match schedule for the tournament's spring season was published on 3 January 1928 by the Danish FA. At the start of the spring season, Kjøbenhavns BK had already outplayed their possibilities of advancement in the tournament by losing to Horsens FS and BK Fremad Amager, while the three other teams could still win the group — Horsens FS (4 points), Viborg FF (2 points), BK Fremad Amager (2 points) and Kjøbenhavns BK (0 points). Two matches in group 1 remained: Kjøbenhavns BK vs. Viborg FF and BK Fremad Amager vs Horsens FS. The rules of the tournament stated, that if three teams would end up with the exact number of points, the team with the best goal average would win the group — Horsens FS had the best options at that point in time due to a better goal average. If only two teams had obtained the same number of points, the team, who had been declared the winner in the teams' football match, would win the group.

The first championship replay match between B 1903 and BK Frem were originally scheduled to take place on 27 June 1928. At a meeting in the evening on 25 June, BK Frem decided to inform the Danish FA, that they would not participate in the first replay match. B 1903 had arranged private matches as part of their 25 years anniversary and did not want to participate in additional games for the Danish league championship. At the same time, the players of the first team of B.93 informed the club's board, that they would not be able to play due to several injuries — the goalkeeper Fritz Tarp had gotten a ruptured muscle at their last match in Fredrikstad — during their tour in Norway. The Danish FA decided to cancel the championship tournament resulting in no winner being announced this season, as both B.93, B 1903 and BK Frem had the same number of points in the championship round.

In late March 2020, B.93 requested the Danish FA to be acknowledged as winners, as they had the best goal score, goal ratio, and had the best internal match score compared to the two other title contenders with six points, BK Frem and B 1903. The request was denied on 1 May 2020 on the basis on the era's different set of rules and that the Danish FA had already at that time made a definite decision.

== Qualified teams ==
Locations of the 1927–28 Danmarksmesterskabsturneringen qualified teams.

With a capacity of more than 15,000 spectators, Københavns Idrætspark was the biggest stadium of the football tournament, and it was the only stadium in use in the championship round. Together with the stadiums at Nykøbing Falster and Rønne, it had partly covered stands, limited seating arrangements and somewhat terraced pitches and fences surrounding the ground. The football fields in Klampenborg, Haslev, Sakskøbing and Odense were left without such features.

Team	Stadium	Association	Qualification	Participation
Rønne BK	Østergadebanen (Note: The ground (aka Banen ved Østergade), located at Morbærstien, Stengade and the area facing Zahrtmannsvej, was commissioned in 1921 and in use until 1947. At the official inauguration of the stadium on 17 July 1927, the playing field had been renovated to a reasonable football field, a wooden stand installed, the ground was surrounded by 1-2 meters high wooden fences and featured two entrances.) (Rønne)	Bornholm FA	Winners of the 1926–27 BBUs Mesterskabsrække	1st
B.93	Københavns Idrætspark, B.93's Bane (Note: Referred to as B.93's Bane (in the official tournament schedules for the Copenhagen FA) or Isbanen (the name of the area before it was converted to a football field), the area with football field was originally established in the spring of 1900 and located between Øster Allé (officially Per Henrik Lings Allé 10) and St. James's Church on Østerbro, right next to Københavns Idrætspark.) (Østerbro)	Copenhagen FA	Winners of the 1926–27 KBUs Mesterskabsrække	1st
B 1903	Københavns Idrætspark, Sundby Idrætspark (Sundbyvester)	Copenhagen FA	Runners-up of the 1926–27 KBUs Mesterskabsrække	1st
Akademisk BK	Københavns Idrætspark, Banen ved Nørre Allé (Nørrebro)	Copenhagen FA	3rd place in the 1926–27 KBUs Mesterskabsrække	1st
BK Frem	Københavns Idrætspark, Banen ved Enghavevej (Vesterbro)	Copenhagen FA	4th place in the 1926–27 KBUs Mesterskabsrække	1st
Kjøbenhavns BK	Københavns Idrætspark	Copenhagen FA	5th place in the 1926–27 KBUs Mesterskabsrække	1st
BK Fremad Amager	Københavns Idrætspark, Sundby Idrætspark (Sundbyvester)	Copenhagen FA	6th place in the 1926–27 KBUs Mesterskabsrække	1st
Handelsstandens BK	Københavns Idrætspark	Copenhagen FA	Winners of the 1926–27 KBUs A-række	1st
Skovshoved IF	Skovshoved Idrætspark (Klampenborg)	Zealand FA	Winners of the 1926–27 SBUs A-række, Kredsvinderturnering	1st
Korsør BK	Banen ved Taarnborgvej (Korsør)	Zealand FA	Runners-up of the 1926–27 SBUs A-række, Kredsvinderturnering	1st
Haslev IF	Haslev Seminariums Bane (Note: Haslev IF played their single home match at Haslev Seminariums Bane, which was specifically modified for participation in the tournament — the ground was expanded, got fenced, new goal posts were installed and markings on the grass were done. The club's usual home ground, Banen bag Sygehuset, had in advance been dismissed by The Danish FA due to its bad condition.) (Haslev)	Zealand FA	3rd place in the 1926–27 SBUs A-række, Kredsvinderturnering	1st
B 1901	Nykøbing Falster Stadion (Note: The town's old stadium, Nykøbing Falster Stadion, was located at the corner of Engboulevarden and Nørre Boulevard, inaugurated in 1919 and featured a main grand stand (nicknamed Hønsehuset) on top of locker rooms and bathing facilities, that was built across Tingvej Å (a stream running on the north side) with the entrance placed on the eastern section of the fenced football field.) (Nykøbing Falster)	Lolland-Falster FA	Winners of the 1926–27 LFBUs Mesterskabsrække	1st
BK Frem Sakskøbing	Sakskøbing Stadion (Note: The town's first real stadium, Sakskøbing Stadion (or Saxkjøbing Stadion), was inaugurated in 1925 and placed between the roads Lunden and Lindevej – with the entrance located in the eastern part of the stadium, at Lunden 14, next to BK Frem Sakskøbing's club house (inaugurated the same year). The association football-specific field was hence also referred to as BK Frems Bane or BK Frems Stadion. In 1950, a new stadium surrounded by a running track was inaugurated at Stadionvej (1 km to the east), replacing the old stadium (now housing a school) and taking over the old stadium's name – with a new club house being inaugurated in 1959 in the southeastern corner.) (ved Lunden, Sakskøbing)	Lolland-Falster FA	Runners-up of the 1926–27 LFBUs Mesterskabsrække	1st
B 1909	B 1909's Bane i Østergade (Odense)	Funen FA	Winners of the 1926–27 FBUs Mesterskabsrække	1st
B 1913	B 1913's Bane bag Assistens Kirkegård (Odense)	Funen FA	Runners-up of the 1926–27 FBUs Mesterskabsrække	1st
Odense BK	OB's Bane i Munke Mose (Odense)	Funen FA	3rd place in the 1926–27 FBUs Mesterskabsrække	1st
Horsens FS	Sportspladsen i Østergade (Horsens)	Jutland FA	Winners of the 1926–27 JBUs Mesterskabsrække Final	1st
Viborg FF	Eksercerpladsen (Viborg)	Jutland FA	Runners-up of the 1926–27 JBUs Mesterskabsrække Final	1st
Aarhus GF	Aarhus Idrætspark (Aarhus)	Jutland FA	Runners-up of the 1926–27 JBUs Mesterskabsrække, North Group	1st
Fredericia BK	Fredericia Idrætspark (Fredericia)	Jutland FA	Runners-up of the 1926–27 JBUs Mesterskabsrække, South Group	1st

== Preliminary round ==
=== 1. Kreds table ===
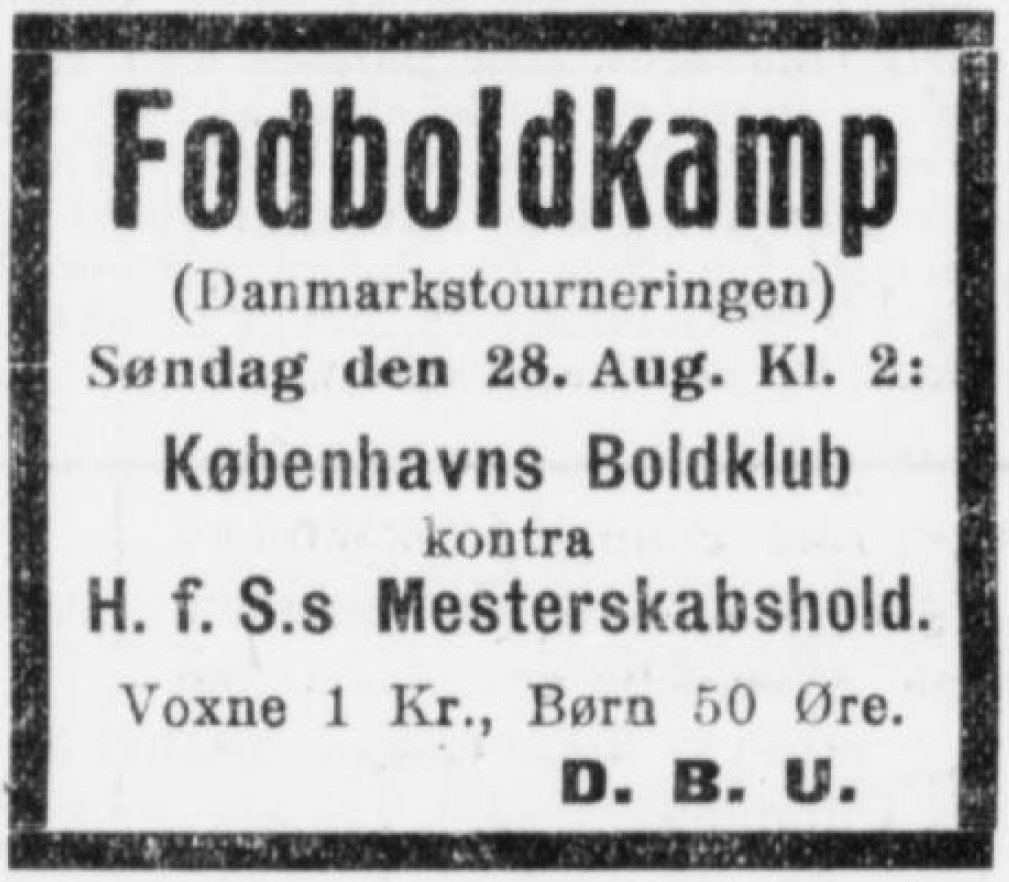
Newspaper advertisement for the first match in the new tournament on Jutland soil played on the first match date, 28 August 1927, between Horsens FS and Kjøbenhavns BK.

Pos	Team	Pld	W	D	L	GF	GA	GR	Pts	Promotion, qualification or relegation
1	BK Fremad Amager	3	2	0	1	9	6	1.500	4 (Note: BK Fremad Amager ahead of Horsens FS in the table due to head-to-head points, which qualified the team for the championship round. The match between the two teams ended in a win for BK Fremad Amager: BK Fremad Amager vs. Horsens FS 5–2.)	Qualification to the Championship round
2	Horsens FS	3	2	0	1	12	7	1.714	4	
3	Kjøbenhavns BK	3	1	0	2	3	7	0.429	2 (Note: Kjøbenhavns BK ahead of Viborg FF in the table due to head-to-head points. The match between the two teams ended in a win for Kjøbenhavns BK: Viborg FF vs. Kjøbenhavns BK 1–2.)	
4	Viborg FF	3	1	0	2	6	10	0.600	2	

Rules for classification: 1) Points; 2) Head-to-head points; 3) Goal ratio

=== 1. Kreds results ===
Home \ Away	BFA	HFS	KBK	VFF
BK Fremad Amager	—	5–2	4–0	—
Horsens FS	—	—	2–1	8–1
Kjøbenhavns BK	—	—	—	—
Viborg FF	4–0	—	1–2	—

Legend: Blue = home team win; Yellow = draw; Red = away team win.

=== 2. Kreds table ===
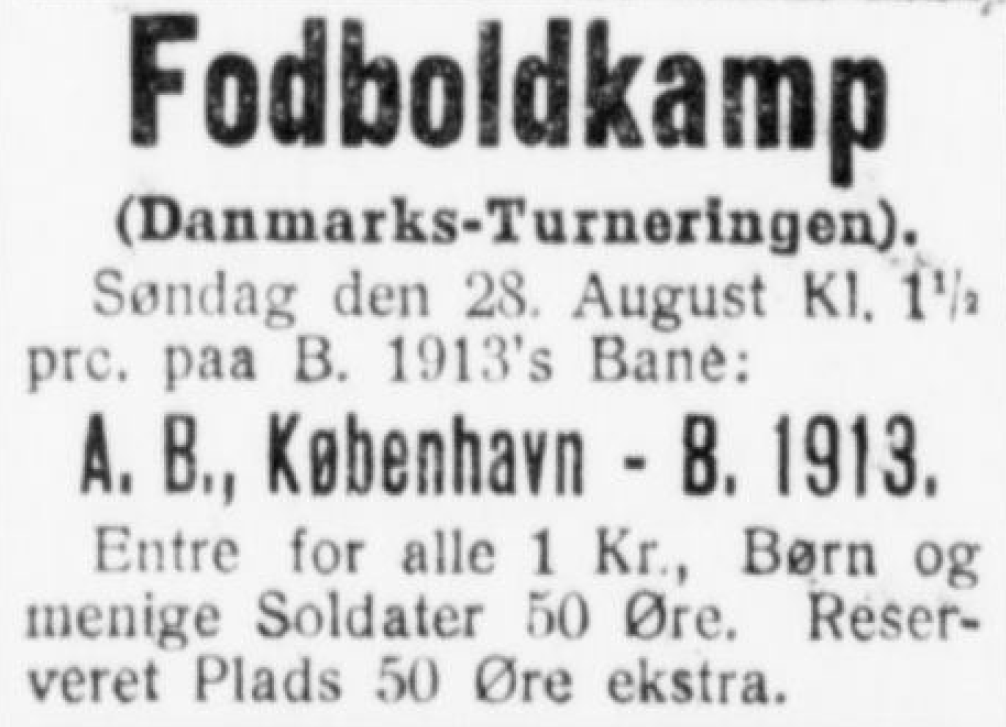
Newspaper advertisement for the first match in the new tournament on Funen soil played on the first match date, 28 August 1927, between B 1913 and Akademisk BK.

Pos	Team	Pld	W	D	L	GF	GA	GR	Pts	Promotion, qualification or relegation
1	Handelsstandens BK	3	2	1	0	10	8	1.250	5	Qualification to the Championship round
2	Aarhus GF	3	1	2	0	5	3	1.667	4	
3	B 1913	3	0	2	1	8	9	0.889	2	
4	Akademisk BK	3	0	1	2	7	10	0.700	1	

Rules for classification: 1) Points; 2) Head-to-head points; 3) Goal ratio

=== 2. Kreds results ===
Home \ Away	HBK	AGF	B13	ABK
Handelsstandens BK	—	—	4–3	—
Aarhus GF	2–2	—	—	2–0
B 1913	—	1–1	—	4–4
Akademisk BK	3–4	—	—	—

Legend: Blue = home team win; Yellow = draw; Red = away team win.

=== 3. Kreds table ===
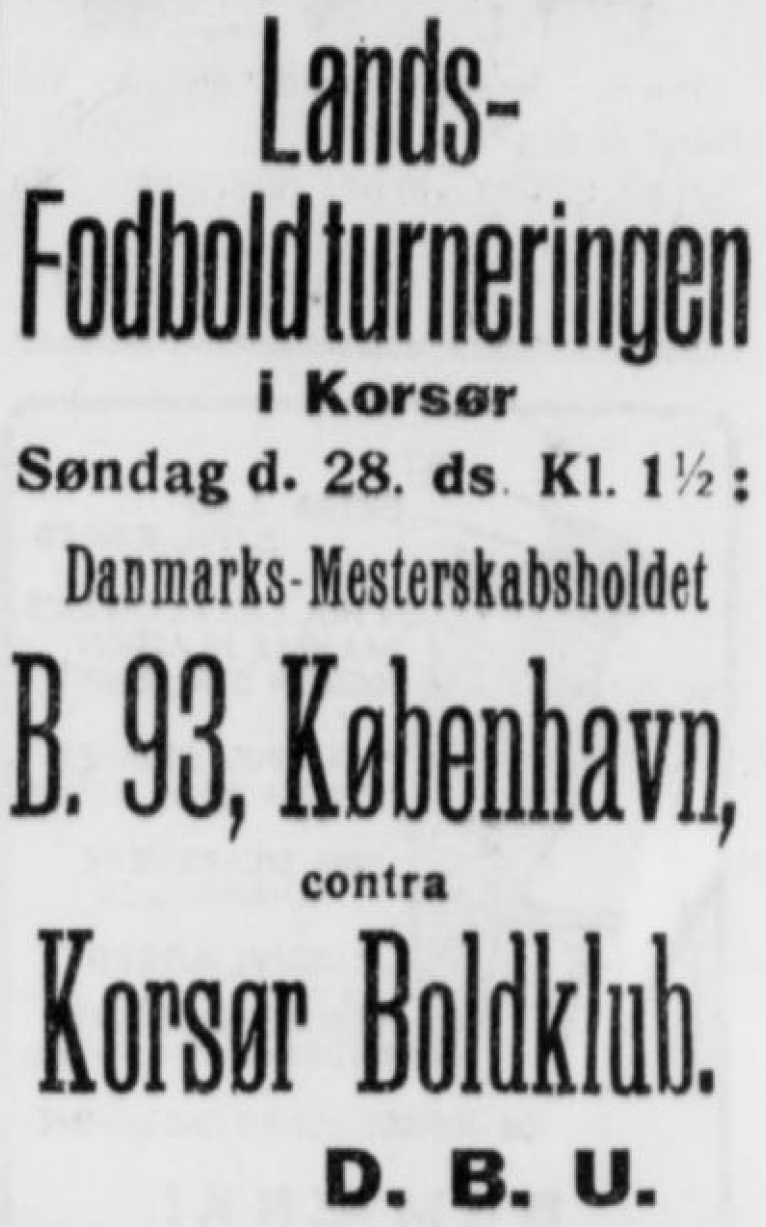
Newspaper advertisement for one of the four tournament matches played on the first match date, 28 August 1927, between Korsør BK and the reigning Danish champions B.93.

Pos	Team	Pld	W	D	L	GF	GA	GR	Pts	Promotion, qualification or relegation
1	B.93	3	2	1	0	12	3	4.000	5	Qualification to the Championship round
2	Korsør BK	3	1	1	1	10	10	1.000	3 (Note: Korsør BK ahead of B 1909 in the table due to head-to-head points. The match between the two teams ended in a win for Korsør BK: B 1909 vs. Korsør BK 0–6.)	
3	B 1909	3	1	1	1	6	10	0.600	3	
4	Fredericia BK	3	0	1	2	5	10	0.500	1	

Rules for classification: 1) Points; 2) Head-to-head points; 3) Goal ratio

=== 3. Kreds results ===
Home \ Away	B93	KBK	B09	FBK
B.93	—	—	2–2	—
Korsør BK	1–7	—	—	—
B 1909	—	0–6	—	4–2
Fredericia BK	0–3	3–3	—	—

Legend: Blue = home team win; Yellow = draw; Red = away team win.

=== 4. Kreds table ===
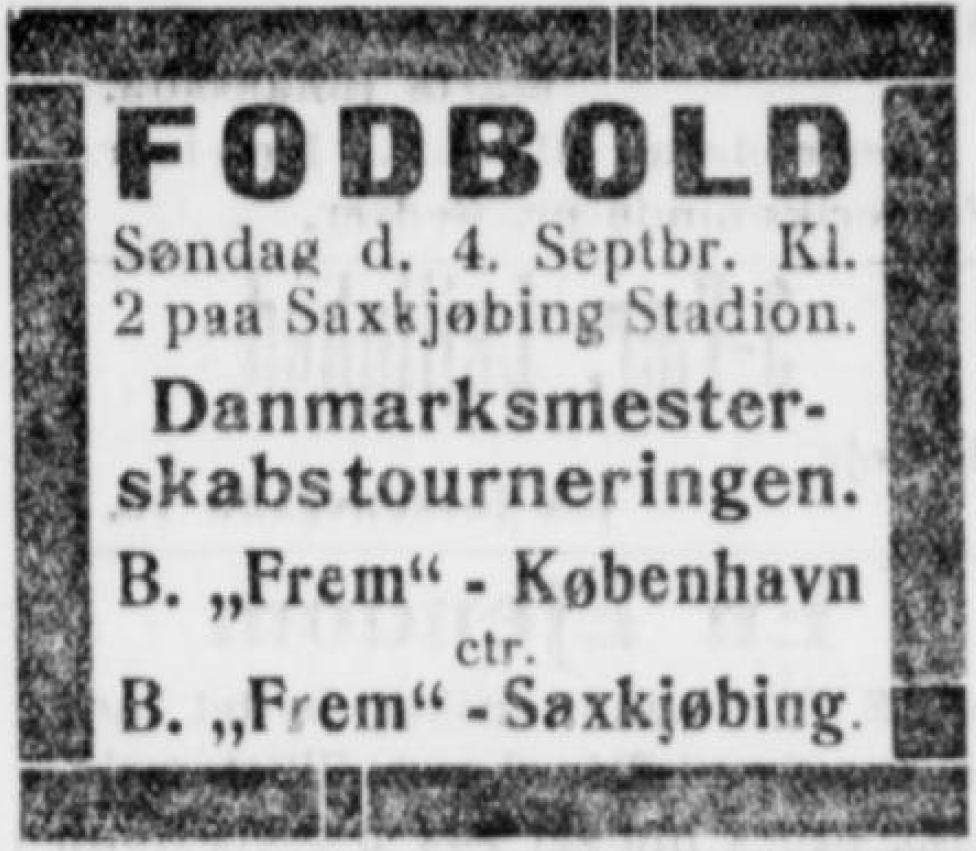
Newspaper advertisement for the first group 4 match played on 4 September 1927, between BK Frem Sakskøbing and BK Frem.

Pos	Team	Pld	W	D	L	GF	GA	GR	Pts	Promotion, qualification or relegation
1	BK Frem	3	2	1	0	15	2	7.500	5	Qualification to the Championship round
2	Odense BK	3	2	0	1	8	9	0.889	4	
3	Skovshoved IF	3	1	0	2	3	11	0.273	2	
4	BK Frem Sakskøbing	3	0	1	2	3	7	0.429	1	

Rules for classification: 1) Points; 2) Head-to-head points; 3) Goal ratio

=== 4. Kreds results ===
Home \ Away	BKF	OBK	SIF	BFS
BK Frem	—	7–1	—	—
Odense BK	—	—	4–0	3–2
Skovshoved IF	0–7	—	—	—
BK Frem Sakskøbing	1–1	—	0–3	—

Legend: Blue = home team win; Yellow = draw; Red = away team win.

=== 5. Kreds table ===
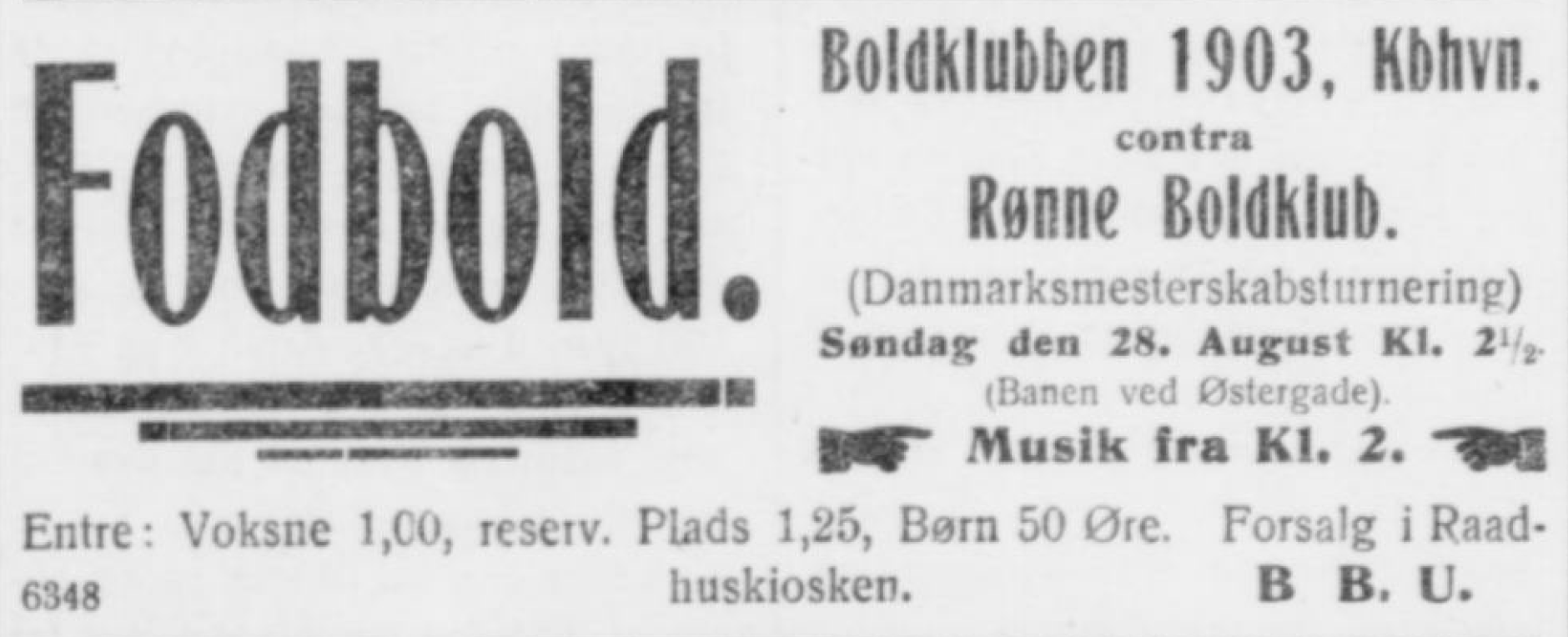
Newspaper advertisement for one of the matches of the tournament played on 28 August 1927, between Rønne BK and B 1903.

Pos	Team	Pld	W	D	L	GF	GA	GR	Pts	Promotion, qualification or relegation
1	B 1903	3	2	1	0	19	3	6.333	5 (Note: B 1903 ahead of B 1901 in the table due to goal ratio, which qualified the team for the championship round. The match between the two teams ended in a tie: B 1901–B 1903 3–3.)	Qualification to the Championship round
2	B 1901	3	2	1	0	18	7	2.571	5	
3	Haslev IF	3	1	0	2	10	13	0.769	2	
4	Rønne BK	3	0	0	3	2	26	0.077	0	

Rules for classification: 1) Points; 2) Head-to-head points; 3) Goal ratio

=== 5. Kreds results ===
Home \ Away	B03	B01	HIF	RBK
B 1903	—	—	5–0	—
B 1901	3–3	—	—	9–0
Haslev IF	—	4–6	—	—
Rønne BK	0–11	—	2–6	—

Legend: Blue = home team win; Yellow = draw; Red = away team win.

== Championship round ==
=== Championship table ===
Pos	Team	Pld	W	D	L	GF	GA	GR	Pts
1	B.93	4	3	0	1	20	6	3.333	6 (Note: Neither B 1903, B.93 nor BK Frem were awarded the championship this season. Head-to-head record: B.93–BK Frem 0–1, B 1903–B.93 1–3, BK Frem–B 1903 2–4)
1	B 1903	4	3	0	1	15	7	2.143	6
1	BK Frem	4	3	0	1	18	11	1.636	6
4	BK Fremad Amager	4	1	0	3	10	26	0.385	2
5	Handelsstandens BK	4	0	0	4	10	23	0.435	0

Rules for classification: 1) Points; 2) Head-to-head points; 3) Goal ratio

=== Championship results ===
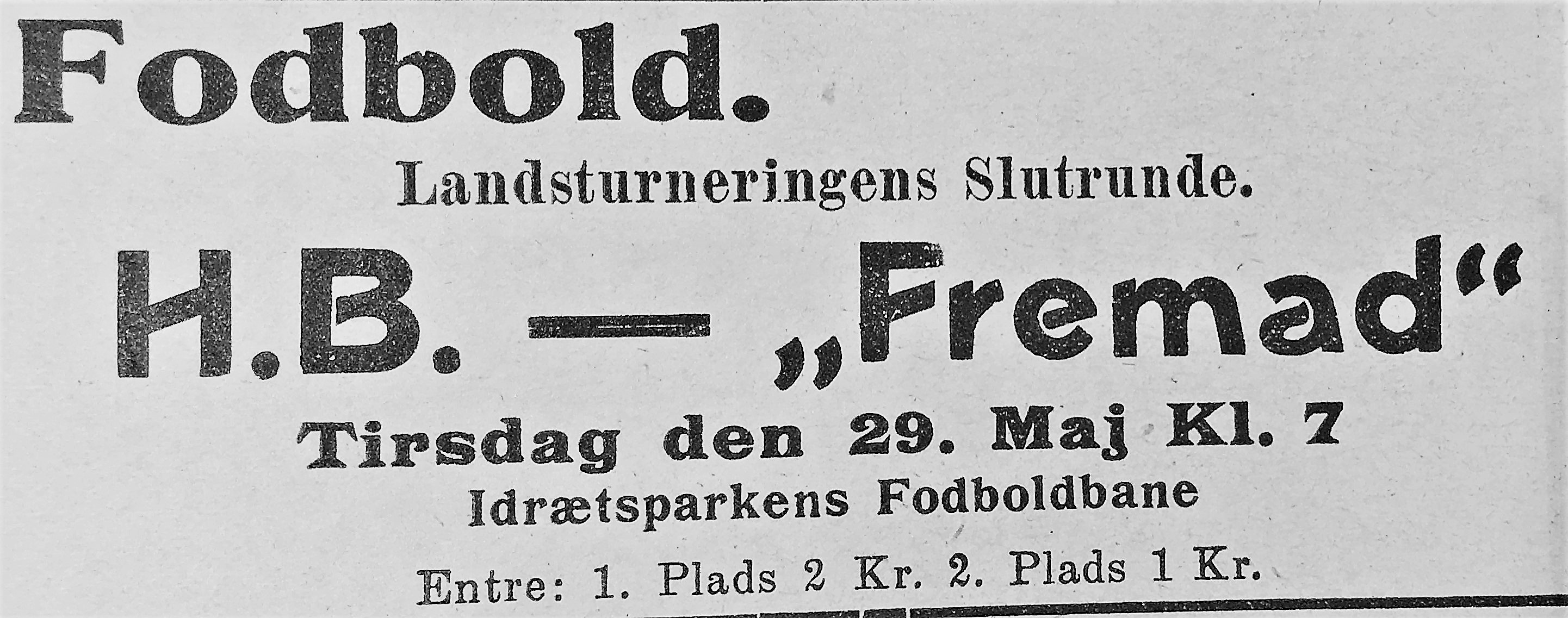
Newspaper advertisement for one of the matches in the final group stage of the tournament played on 29 May 1928, between BK Fremad Amager and Handelsstandens BK.

Home \ Away	B93	B03	BKF	BFA	HBK
B.93	—	—	0–1	9–2	—
B 1903	1–3	—	—	7–0	—
BK Frem	—	2–4	—	—	8–3
BK Fremad Amager	—	—	4–7	—	4–3
Handelsstandens BK	2–8	2–3	—	—	—

Legend: Blue = home team win; Yellow = draw; Red = away team win.

== Season statistics ==
=== Scoring ===
==== Goal scorers ====
There were 244 goals scored in 40 matches, for an average of 6.1 goals per match.

Three own goals were scored during the tournament.

13 goals

- (Denmark) Aksel (Axel) Hansen (B 1903)

11 goals

- (Denmark) Michael Rohde (B.93)

9 goals

- (Denmark) Ernst Quick (BK Fremad Amager)
- (Denmark) Holger Brodthagen (B 1901)
- (Denmark) Svend Hansen (BK Frem)

8 goals

- (Denmark) Kaj Uldaler (BK Frem)

7 goals

- (Denmark) Viggo Jørgensen (B 1903)
- (Denmark) Georg Hansen (B.93)

6 goals

- (Denmark) Pauli Jørgensen (BK Frem)

5 goals

- (Denmark) Sigvald Sørensen (Horsens FS)
- (Denmark) Creutz Jensen (B 1909)
- (Denmark) Arne Hansen (Haslev IF)
- (Denmark) Elsøe "Busse" Jensen (Odense BK)
- (Denmark) Carl "Skoma'r" Hansen (B 1903)

4 goals

- (Denmark) Harald Sørensen (Korsør BK)
- (Denmark) Anthon Olsen (B.93)
- (Denmark) Sofus Johansen (BK Frem)
- (Denmark) Ernst Nilsson (B 1903)
- (Denmark) Kaj Petersen (Handelsstandens BK)

3 goals

- (Denmark) Knud Kastrup (BK Fremad Amager)
- (Denmark) Henrik Selschau (BK Fremad Amager)
- (Denmark) Bernard "Bette" Andersen (BK Fremad Amager)
- (Denmark) Thorvald Schultz (Fredericia BK)
- (Denmark) Svend Hansen (Horsens FS)
- (Denmark) Svend Aage Eriksen (B 1901)
- (Denmark) Poul Erik Boesen (B 1901)
- (Denmark) Emil Hansen (Handelsstandens BK)
- (Denmark) Henning Nielsen (Handelsstandens BK)
- (Denmark) Kaj Nielsen (Handelsstandens BK)
- (Denmark) Ole Olsen (Handelsstandens BK)
- (Denmark) Ejner Nielsen (Handelsstandens BK)
- (Denmark) Knud Lindegaard (B 1913)
- (Denmark) Carl Hansen (B 1913)
- (Denmark) Gabriel Ejrnæs (Akademisk BK)
- (Denmark) Petrus Petersen (Korsør BK)
- (Denmark) Carl Kirchheiner (B.93)

2 goals

- (Denmark) Axel "Star" Husted (Viborg FF)
- (Denmark) Casper Nielsen (Viborg FF)
- (Denmark) Thorkild Jørgensen (Aarhus GF)
- (Denmark) Carl Rasmussen (Haslev IF)
- (Denmark) Harry Bendixen (Akademisk BK)
- (Denmark) Harry Eduard Olsen (B.93)
- (Denmark) William Gram (B.93)
- (Denmark) Fridtjof Steen (B 1903)
- (Denmark) Henry Hansen (B 1903)
- (Denmark) Carl Stoltz (BK Frem)
- (Denmark) Henri Olsen (BK Frem)
- (Denmark) ? Ulrich (B 1901)

1 goal

- (Denmark) Ejler Krak (BK Fremad Amager)
- (Denmark) Niels Christian Sørensen (Horsens FS)
- (Denmark) Viggo Sørensen (Horsens FS)
- (Denmark) Viggo Mellerup (Horsens FS)
- (Denmark) Holger "Dirk" Asmussen (Kjøbenhavns BK)
- (Denmark) Valdemar Laursen (Kjøbenhavns BK)
- (Denmark) Erik Eriksen (Kjøbenhavns BK)
- (Denmark) Ejner Jacobsen (Viborg FF)
- (Denmark) Helmuth Weismose (Viborg FF)
- (Denmark) Alfred Woidemann (Aarhus GF)
- (Denmark) Søren Jensen (Aarhus GF)
- (Denmark) Rasmus Gundlev (Aarhus GF)
- (Denmark) Rudolf Petersen (B 1909)
- (Denmark) Erik Hjorth (Rønne BK)
- (Denmark) Knud Thorsen (Rønne BK)
- (Denmark) Helmuth Thomas (Skovshoved IF)
- (Denmark) Bernard Møller (Skovshoved IF)
- (Denmark) Alex Guhle (Skovshoved IF)
- (Denmark) Axel Rasmussen (B 1913)
- (Denmark) Poul Espe (B 1913)
- (Denmark) Eiler Holm (BK Frem)
- (Denmark) Aksel Andersen (BK Frem)
- (Denmark) Bernhard Jacobsen (B 1903)
- (Denmark) Holger Larsen (Akademisk BK)
- (Denmark) Eyolf Kleven (Akademisk BK)
- (Denmark) Otto Eriksen (Odense BK)
- (Denmark) Børge Hansen (Haslev IF)
- (Denmark) Poul "Pølse" Jensen (B.93)
- (Denmark) Svend Petersen (B.93)
- (Denmark) Poul Offenbach (B.93)
- (Denmark) Ove Jørgensen (Haslev IF)
- (Denmark) P. Schwartz (Haslev IF)
- (Denmark) J. Fugl (B 1901)
- (Denmark) Børge Jensen (Odense BK)
- (Denmark) ? Lahn (Odense BK)
- (Denmark) Otto Hoffmann (Fredericia BK)
- (Denmark) ? Fangel (Fredericia BK)
- (Denmark) Peter Petersen (BK Frem Sakskøbing)
- Unnamed player (BK Frem Sakskøbing)
- (Denmark) Oluf "Ole" Petersen (Korsør BK)
- (Denmark) Carl Jensen (Korsør BK)
- Unnamed player (Korsør BK)

1 own goal

- (Denmark) Hermann Brügmann (Viborg FF) against Horsens FS
- (Denmark) Edvin Frigast Larsen (Akademisk BK) against Handelsstandens BK
- (Denmark) Harry Conradsen (Odense BK) against BK Frem Sakskøbing

==== Hat-tricks ====
Player	For	Against	Result	Date	Ref
(Denmark) Aksel Hansen^{8}	B1903	Rønne BK	11–0 (A)	28 August 1927	
(Denmark) Michael Rohde^{4}	B.93	Korsør BK	7–1 (A)	28 August 1927	
(Denmark) Sigvald Sørensen^{4}	Horsens FS	Viborg FF	8–1 (H)	4 September 1927	
(Denmark) Elsøe "Busse" Jensen	Odense BK	Skovshoved IF	4–0 (H)	11 September 1927	
(Denmark) Creutz Jensen	B 1909	Fredericia BK	4–2 (H)	18 September 1927	
(Denmark) Holger Brodthagen^{5}	B 1901	Rønne BK	9–0 (H)	18 September 1927	
(Denmark) Arne Hansen	Haslev IF	B 1901	4–6 (H)	25 September 1927	
(Denmark) Svend Hansen	BK Frem	Odense BK	7–1 (H)	25 September 1927	
(Denmark) Kaj Petersen	Handelsstandens BK	B 1913	4–3 (H)	2 October 1927	
(Denmark) Harald Sørensen^{4}	Korsør BK	B 1909	6–0 (A)	5 April 1928	
(Denmark) Bernard "Bette" Andersen	BK Fremad Amager	Horsens FS	5–2 (H)	5 April 1928	
(Denmark) Pauli Jørgensen	BK Frem	Handelsstandens BK	8–3 (H)	4 May 1928	
(Denmark) Michael Rohde^{4}	B.93	BK Fremad Amager	9–2 (H)	8 June 1928	
(Denmark) Ernst Quick^{4}	BK Fremad Amager	BK Frem	4–7 (H)	10 June 1928	
(Denmark) Kaj Uldaler	BK Frem	BK Fremad Amager	7–4 (A)	10 June 1928	

- ^{4} Player scored 4 goals
- ^{5} Player scored 5 goals
- ^{8} Player scored 8 goals

=== Clean sheets ===
Rank	Player	Club	Clean sheets	Ref
1	(Denmark) Niels Hansen	BK Frem	2	
1	(Denmark) Poul Christiansen	B 1903	2	
3	(Denmark) Aksel Petersen	Odense BK	1	
3	(Denmark) Aksel Pedersen	Viborg FF	1	
3	(Denmark) Justus Hansen	B 1901	1	
3	(Denmark) Einer Jensen	Skovshoved IF	1	
3	(Denmark) Viggo Petersen	BK Fremad Amager	1	
3	(Denmark) Carl Voigt	Aarhus GF	1	
3	(Denmark) Theodor Møller	Korsør BK	1	
3	(Denmark) Svend Jensen	B.93	1	
3	(Denmark) Axel Melchiorsen	B 1903	1	

=== Attendance ===
Home ╲ Away	RØN	B93	B03	AKA	BKF	KJØ	BFA	HAN	SKO	KOR	HAS	B01	BFS	B09	B13	ODE	HOR	VIB	AGF	FBK	Tot	Avg	Max	Min
Rønne BK		—	1,050	—	—	—	—	—	—	—	200	—	—	—	—	—	—	—	—	—	1,250	625	1,050	200
B.93	—		—	—	10,500	—	1,000	—	—	—	—	—	—	3,000	—	—	—	—	—	—	14,500	4,833	10,500	1,000
B 1903	—	6,000		—	—	—	—	—	—	—	400	—	2,000	—	—	—	—	—	—	—	8,400	2,800	6,000	400
Akademisk BK	—	—	—		—	—	—	200	—	—	—	—	—	—	—	—	—	—	—	—	200	200	200	200
BK Frem	—	—	7,500	—		—	—	—	—	—	—	—	—	—	—	1,000	—	—	—	—	8,500	4,250	7,500	1,000
Kjøbenhavns BK	—	—	—	—	—		—	—	—	—	—	—	—	—	—	—	—	—	—	—	—	—	—	—
BK Fremad Amager	—	—	—	—	2,000	2,000		600	—	—	—	—	—	—	—	—	550	—	—	—	5,150	1,288	2,000	550
Handelsstandens BK	—	2,000	2,000	—	—	—	—		—	—	—	—	—	—	625	—	—	—	—	—	4,625	1,542	2,000	625
Skovshoved IF	—	—	—	—	400	—	—	—		—	—	—	—	—	—	—	—	—	—	—	400	400	400	400
Korsør BK	—	875	—	—	—	—	—	—	—		—	—	—	—	—	—	—	—	—	—	875	875	875	875
Haslev IF	—	—	—	—	—	—	—	—	—	—		100	—	—	—	—	—	—	—	—	100	100	100	100
B 1901	650	—	1,500	—	—	—	—	—	—	—	—		—	—	—	—	—	—	—	—	2,150	1,075	1,500	650
BK Frem Sakskøbing	—	—	—	—	300	—	—	—	550	—	—	—		—	—	—	—	—	—	—	850	425	550	300
B 1909	—	—	—	—	—	—	—	—	—	300	—	—	—		—	—	—	—	—	900	1,200	600	900	300
B 1913	—	—	—	1,800	—	—	—	—	—	—	—	—	—	—		—	—	—	2,000	—	3,800	1,900	2,000	1,800
Odense BK	—	—	—	—	—	—	—	—	1,200	—	—	—	—	—	—		—	—	—	—	1,200	1,200	1,200	1,200
Horsens FS	—	—	—	—	—	1,400	—	—	—	—	—	—	—	—	—	—		1,200	—	—	2,600	1,300	1,400	1,200
Viborg FF	—	—	—	—	—	1,000	1,350	—	—	—	—	—	—	—	—	—	—		—	—	2,350	1,175	1,350	1,000
Aarhus GF	—	—	—	—	—	—	—	1,400	—	—	—	—	—	—	—	—	—	—		—	1,400	1,400	1,400	1,400
Fredericia BK	—	1,250	—	—	—	—	—	—	—	650	—	—	—	—	—	—	—	—	—		1,900	950	1,250	650
Total	650	10,125	12,050	1,800	13,200	4,400	2,350	2,200	1,750	950	600	100	2,000	3,000	625	1,000	550	1,200	2,000	900	61,450			
Average	650	2,531	3,013	1,800	3,300	1,467	1,175	733	875	475	300	100	2,000	3,000	625	1,000	550	1,200	2,000	900		1,661		
Maximum	650	6,000	7,500	1,800	10,500	2,000	1,350	1,400	1,200	650	400	100	2,000	3,000	625	1,000	550	1,200	2,000	900			10,500	
Minimum	650	875	1,050	1,800	300	1,000	1,000	200	550	300	200	100	2,000	3,000	625	1,000	550	1,200	2,000	900				100
