= 1926–27 KBUs A-række =

KBUs A-række
- Season: 1926–27
- Dates: 29 August 1926 – 1 June 1927 (regular season); 16–28 June 1927 (play-offs)
- Champions: Handelsstandens BK (1st title)
- Promoted: none
- Relegated: none
- Matches: 55
- Goals: 307 (5.58 per match)
- Biggest home win: Hellerup IK 12–0 BK Standard (5 September 1926)
- Biggest away win: BK Union 3–8 KFUMs BK (14 November 1926); BK Borup 1–6 Hellerup IK (24 October 1926); BK Standard 3–8 BK Viktoria (10 October 1926); B 1908 0–5 KFUMs BK (10 October 1926)
- Highest scoring: Hellerup IK 12–0 BK Standard (5 September 1926); BK Viktoria 4–8 Østerbros BK (12 September 1926)
- Total number of matches and goals played does not include the records expunged for BK Velo and the promotion/relegation play-offs.

The 1926–27 KBUs A-række (administratively known as Senior Række A 1, 1926/27) was the 21st season of the KBUs A-række, the second-tier of the Copenhagen football league structure organised by the Copenhagen FA (KBU). The season was launched on 29 August 1926 with three games and the final match was played on 1 June 1927 with the promotion and relegation play-off matches being held on 16 and 28 June 1927. BK Fremad Amager were the defending league winners, earning promotion to the 1926–27 KBUs Mesterskabsrække and replacing KFUMs BK, who were relegated to this season of the KBUs A-række. The winner of the league would automatically qualify for the inaugural season of the new Danish Championship play-off structure, the 1927–28 Danmarksmesterskabsturneringen i Fodbold and for the promotion/relegation play-off against the lowest placed team of the 1926–27 KBUs Mesterskabsrække for a spot in the 1927–28 KBUs Mesterskabsrække. The winners and runners-up also qualified for the 1927 KBUs Pokalturnering.

The winners of the league were Handelsstandens BK (HB), which was their first second-tier league title within the Copenhagen FA, with Østerbros BK (ØB) becoming the league runners-up for their second consecutive season. BK Velo participated in the first half of the season, but was dissolved in February 1927, and resigned its membership of the Copenhagen FA in March 1927, which meant that their records in the league were expunged, decreasing the official number of teams in the league from 12 to 11. According to the then tournament's rules, BK Standard's status as an extraordinary member of the league meant that they would enter into the promotion/relegation play-offs against the winner of the 1926–27 KBUs B-række, Christianshavns BK, despite finishing at the bottom of the league table with three other teams. Winning their first play-off match, BK Standard managed to secure their spot for another season of the KBUs A-række.

== Season summary ==
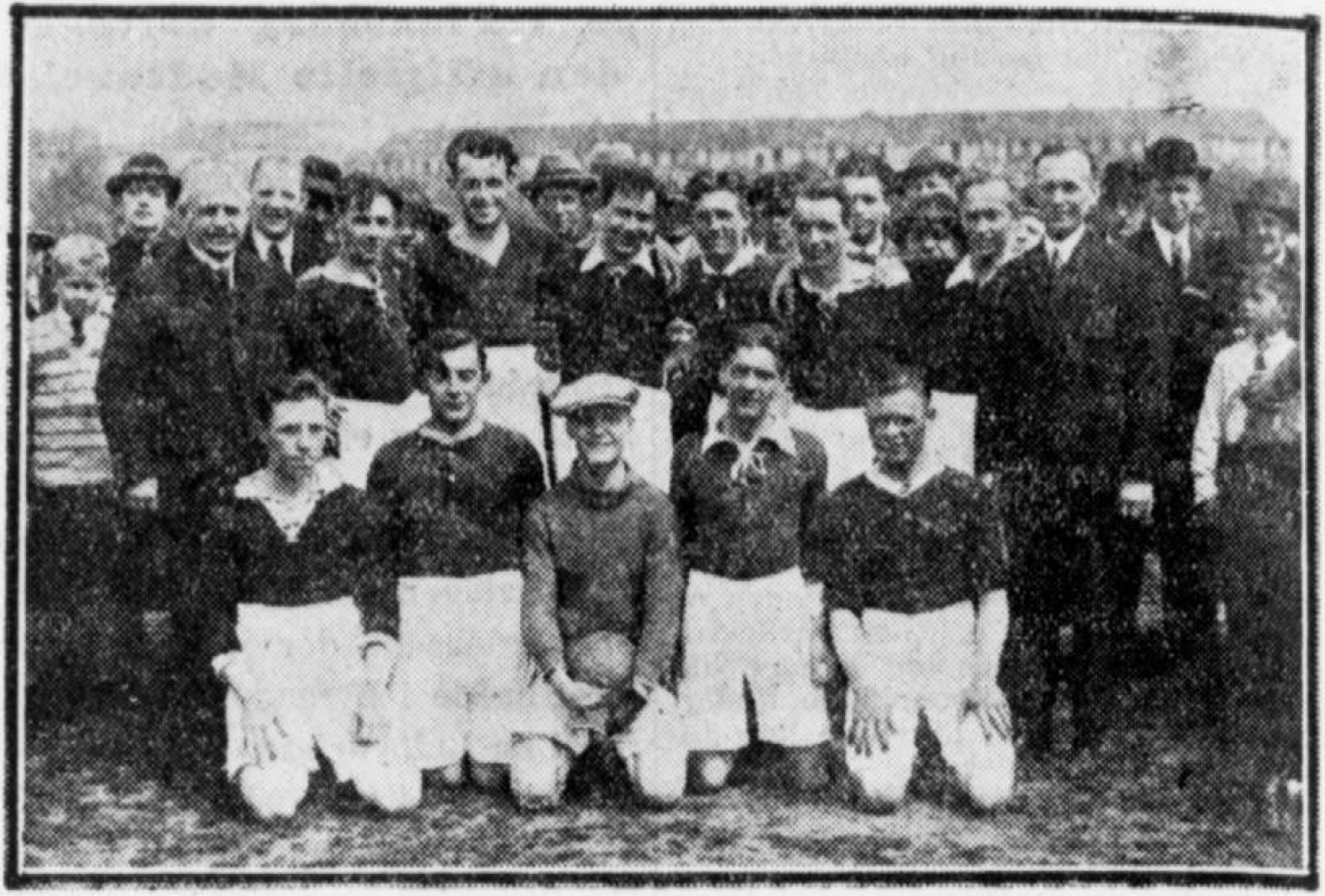
The team line-up including club management after the last league match against BK Standard on 22 May 1927, where the club were crowned as winners of the 1926–27 season of the KBUs A-Række.

The final decision to relegate KFUMs BK from the first-tier league to the second-tier league, instead of expanding the KBUs Mesterskabsrække with one additional team in order to have KFUMs BK remain in the regional top flight league, was made at the Copenhagen FA's general assembly meeting on 13 August 1926. The fixtures for the fall season had been published by the Copenhagen FA in mid-August 1926. The cup final in the 1926 edition of the Fælledklubbernes Pokalturnering was contested between league rivals BK Union and Hellerup IK on 19 September 1926 at Københavns Idrætspark with Hellerup IK the match winning 6–1. KFUMs BK was defeated by Kjøbenhavns BK in the first round of the 1926 KBUs Pokalturnering, while Østerbros BK reached the semi-finals before being eliminated by B.93.

The season was officially launched on 29 August 1926 with three league matches featuring Østerbros BK versus BK Velo, Frederiksberg BK versus KFUMs BK and Valby BK versus BK Viktoria. The first game of the season featured the last season's runners-up Østerbros BK (ØB) against last season's sixth placed BK Velo on one of the football fields at Fælleden with Østerbros BK winning the game 5–1 and the first goal of the season being scored by ØB's Charles Nielsen in the first half in front of a crowd of 1,500 spectators. KFUMs BK's first league match since their relegation from the 1925–26 KBUs Mesterskabsrække was lost 1–3 against Frederiksberg BK. The remaining three matches of the first match day were played the following weekend and included Hellerup IK's winning the game 12–0, the largest win of the season, against BK Standard on 5 September 1926 at Hellerup Sportspark, where Hellerup IK's forward Reinholdt Sylvander scored six goals, the largest number of goals in a single game of the season.

Forward Einard Larsen of KFUMs BK was selected for the KBU selected team that played the final of the last edition of the Sylow-Tournament on 7 November 1926, which otherwise consisted solely of players from the KBUs Mesterskabsrække. An additional Copenhagen FA team, exclusively composed of players from the KBUs A-række, competed in the early stages of the 1926 Sylow-Tournament. For the quarter match against the LFBU selected team on 3 October 1926 at Københavns Idrætspark, the line-up of the Copenhagen A-team consisted of players from BK Union, Frederiksberg BK, Hellerup IK, Østerbros BK, KFUMs BK, B 1908 and BK Viktoria.

Upon Carl Skoma'r Hansen's return to Danish league football following his professional playing contract with Rangers F.C., his two-year mandatory quarantine was among other things spent on officiating several friendly and competitive matches in the second-tier league, including B 1908 versus KFUMs BK on 10 October 1926 at Sundby Idrætspark, B 1908 versus BK Viktoria on 31 October 1926 at Sundby Idrætspark, Valby BK against BK Borup on 14 November 1926 at Fælleden and the matches between BK Standard versus BK Borup and B 1908 versus Hellerup IK both at Sundby Idrætspark on 27 March 1927.

At the last match day of the fall season, the title contenders for the top spot were Østerbros BK, having won all five league games, with the closest contenders being Handelsstandens BK and KFUMs BK (each having three wins, one tie and one loss), while BK Standard were placed at the bottom of the league standings without any points.

During the off season in the winter period, BK Velo officially ceased to exist as a club. After having failed to pay their annual membership fee of the regional football association, and not fielding a representative club member at the general assembly of the Copenhagen FA on 24 February 1927, BK Velo were automatically expelled as a member. Since their relegation from the regional top-flight league in the 1917–18 season, several of the club's best senior players had steadily moved to the higher ranking clubs in the Copenhagen area. Failing to win the second-tier league nor reaching the promotion play-offs in the intermediate seasons, their 1926 fall season proved to be no success to the club either, only winning on one occasion (against BK Standard) and losing their other four games. BK Velo's league record was expunged, before the club's next scheduled league match against Hellerup IK on 24 April 1927 and their membership with the Copenhagen FA were administratively cancelled on 15 March 1927. The Copenhagen FA considered waiving the tournament rules that banned the defunct club's players from playing for other clubs in the remaining part of the present season.

The fixtures for the 1927 spring season was published by the Copenhagen FA on 5 March 1927. Østerbros BK had an unstable spring season, but still managed to keep themselves in the title race all the way to their last match day. With only two games left in their league schedules, both title contenders, Østerbros BK and Handelsstandens BK, had the opportunity to final on top. After an eight game undefeated run for Østerbros BK, the game against Handelsstandens BK on 15 May 1927 ended with Handelsstandens BK winning 2–0 at Fælleden to an audience of 2,000 spectators, gaining the upper hand in the title struggle. Østerbros BK obtained the top spot in the league standings three days prior to Handelsstandens BK's last game. By winning their own last league game 5–1 against BK Borup on 19 May 1927 at Københavns Idrætspark to an audience of 1,500 spectators, Østerbros BK put the pressure on Handelsstandens BK having to win their last match. Handelsstandens BK secured their first second-tier league championship by winning the last match day game 2–0 at Fælleden against BK Standard on 22 May 1927, scoring a goal in both the first and second half. The line-up for Handelsstandens BK's last match consisted of Karl Christiansen, Kaj Petersen, Kaj Dihver, Viggo Kruse, Poul Jørgensen, Frederik Wieler, Ejner Nielsen, Henning Nielsen, Otto Jørgensen, Ejner Jørgensen og Ole Olsen. After Niels Hansen moved to BK Frem in the 1926 summer off season, Karl Christiansen had become HB's replacement as the first team's goalkeeper, obtaining five clean sheets and having the best defensive line-up in the 1926/27 season.

The last match of the regular season took place in the evening on 1 June 1927 between Hellerup IK and KFUMs BK at Københavns Idrætspark. Originally, it was scheduled to take place on 29 May 1927 at Hellerup IK's home ground (referred to as Hellerup Sportspark or Banen ved Phistersvej), but as a means of showcasing competitive association football at the Copenhagen second-tier league championship, it was rescheduled. The match was without significance with regard to the championship, cup qualification, promotion and relegation play-offs, and only the final standings in the league for both clubs were in play. A couple of hundred spectators witnessed KFUMs BK winning the game 2-1, officiated by Valdemar Nilsson, plagued by rain after 15 minutes of play and poor visual conditions in the second half, with goals being scored by KFUM's forwards Poul Hesse in 22nd minute and Lauritz Larsen in the 67th minute and HIK's forward William Kirkland in the 27th minute.

Due to BK Standard's losing streak in the fall of 1926, the local newspapers regarded them as the most likely team to be relegated to the Copenhagen third-tier by the end of the season. However, in the spring season 1927, they managed to secure several league points, including a 5–5 draw against KFUMs BK, but nonetheless ended up in the last spot in the league standings. As a result of their improvements, they were regarded by the newspapers Social-Demokraten and Klokken 5 as the team to end on top in the relegation/promotion play-offs against the 1926–27 KBUs B-Række winner and neighbouring club, Christianshavns BK. BK Standard won the first play-off match against Christianshavns BK, securing the club another season in the league.

== Teams ==
=== Stadia and locations ===
None of the grounds used by the clubs in the league had grandstands installed and several did not have enclosures preventing the clubs from demanding entrance fees to their matches. Two league matches involving Østerbros BK versus BK Borup and Hellerup IK versus KFUMs BK were moved to Københavns Idrætspark.

Club	Location	Stadium
Handelsstandens BK	Østerbro	Fælleden
Østerbros BK	Østerbro	Fælleden
Hellerup IK	Hellerup	Hellerup Sportspark
KFUMs BK	Emdrup	Emdrup Idrætspark
B 1908	Sundbyvester	Sundby Idrætspark
BK Viktoria	Østerbro	Fælleden
Frederiksberg BK	Frederiksberg	Frederiksberg Idrætspark
BK Borup	Østerbro	Fælleden
BK Union	Østerbro	Fælleden
Valby BK	Valby	Valby Fælled (1 game); Fælleden
BK Standard	Sundbyøster	Sundby Idrætspark
BK Velo	Østerbro	Fælleden

== League table ==
A total of twelve teams were contesting the league, including eleven sides from the 1925–26 season and one relegated from the 1925–26 KBUs Mesterskabsrække. No team was promoted from the 1925–26 KBUs B-række. Every team played one game against each other team, either one at home or away. Teams received two points for a win and one point for a draw. If two or more teams were tied on points, places in the league table were determined by head-to-head points and goal ratio, otherwise the teams would all get the same position in the standings. The team with the most points were crowned winners of the league and entered into a promotion play-off, while the team with the fewest points would enter a relegation play-off. Replay matches would be scheduled to determine a definitive league champion in case of two or more teams having the same number of points at the top of the league.

Pos	Team	Pld	W	D	L	GF	GA	GR	Pts	Promotion, qualification or relegation
1	Handelsstandens BK (C)	10	8	1	1	28	12	2.333	17	Qualification for the Promotion play-offs, 1927 KBUs Pokalturnering & 1927–28 Danmarksmesterskabsturneringen
2	Østerbros BK	10	7	2	1	34	19	1.789	16	Qualification for the 1927 KBUs Pokalturnering
3	Hellerup IK	10	6	1	3	42	16	2.625	13	
4	KFUMs BK	10	4	3	3	34	21	1.619	11 (Note: KFUMs BK are ahead of B 1908 on head-to-head points: B 1908 0–5 KFUMs BK.)	
5	B 1908	10	5	1	4	31	25	1.240	11	
6	BK Viktoria	10	5	0	5	31	26	1.192	10	
7	Frederiksberg BK	10	4	0	6	20	32	0.625	8	
8	BK Borup	10	2	2	6	19	37	0.514	6 (Note: As an extraordinary member of the league, tournament rules stipulated that BK Standard were to participate in the relegation play-off.)	
8	BK Union	10	3	0	7	27	34	0.794	6	
8	Valby BK	10	3	0	7	17	40	0.425	6	
8	BK Standard (O)	10	2	2	6	24	45	0.533	6	Qualification to the Promotion/relegation play-offs
12	BK Velo	0	0	0	0	0	0	—	0 (Note: BK Velo were officially expelled from the league following the club's collapse in February 1927.)	Club expelled and records expunged

Rules for classification: 1) Points; 2) Head-to-head points; 3) Goal ratio
(C) Champions; (O) Play-off winners

== Results ==
Home \ Away	HBK	OEB	HIK	KFU	B08	BKV	FBK	BKB	BKU	VBK	BKS	BVE^{‡}
Handelsstandens BK	—	2–0	2–0	—	—	—	5–2	3–0	4–3	4–1	2–0	—
Østerbros BK	—	—	2–2	—	2–2	—	—	5–1	4–2	—	—	5–1^{‡}
Hellerup IK	—	—	—	1–2	—	2–1	—	—	2–0	7–0	12–0	—
KFUMs BK	1–1	1–2	—	—	—	—	1–3	2–2	—	7–1	—	5–3^{‡}
B 1908	5–2	—	4–3	0–5	—	2–3	5–1	—	4–2	—	6–1	—
BK Viktoria	0–3	4–8	—	3–2	—	—	—	—	—	7–1	—	—
Frederiksberg BK	—	2–3	4–7	—	—	2–1	—	3–1	1–2	2–0	—	9–1^{‡}
BK Borup	—	—	1–6	—	3–2	3–2	—	—	3–6	—	—	—
BK Union	—	—	—	3–8	—	2–4	—	—	—	—	6–2	—
Valby BK	—	1–4	—	—	3–1	—	—	6–3	2–1	—	—	—
BK Standard	—	2–4	—	5–5	—	1–6	7–0	2–2	—	4–2	—	—
BK Velo^{‡}	—	—	—	—	—	—	—	2–4^{‡}	—	—	5–3^{‡}	—

Legend: Blue = home team win; Yellow = draw; Red = away team win.

^{‡}: BK Velo was expelled from the league in February 1927 and had all their records expunged.

== Season statistics ==
=== Hat-tricks ===
Player	For	Against	Result	Date	Ref
(Denmark) Axel Jensen^{4}	BK Viktoria	Valby BK	7–1 (H)	29 August 1926	
(Denmark) Reinholdt Sylvander^{6}	Hellerup IK	BK Standard	12–0 (H)	5 September 1926	
(Denmark) Wickmann	Østerbros BK	BK Viktoria	8–4 (A)	12 September 1926	
(Denmark) Hemming Nielsen	B 1908	BK Union	6–1 (H)	19 September 1926	
(Denmark) Hemming Nielsen	B 1908	Handelsstandens BK	5–2 (H)	26 September 1926	
(Denmark) Reinholdt Sylvander	Hellerup IK	Frederiksberg BK	7–4 (A)	10 October 1926	
(Denmark) Einard Larsen^{4}	KFUMs BK	B 1908	5–0 (A)	10 October 1926	
(Denmark) Reinholdt Sylvander^{4}	Hellerup IK	BK Borup	6–1 (A)	24 October 1926	
(Denmark) Henrik Selschau	BK Velo	BK Standard	5–3 (H)	31 October 1926	
(Denmark) Georg Larsen^{4}	Frederiksberg BK	BK Velo	6–3 (H)	14 November 1926	
(Denmark) Sniðlvur Jacobsen	KFUMs BK	BK Union	8–3 (A)	14 November 1926	
(Denmark) Ernst Madsen	KFUMs BK	Valby BK	7–1 (H)	27 March 1927	
(Denmark) Edwin Petersen	BK Standard	KFUMs BK	5–5 (H)	1 May 1927	
(Denmark) Eyvind Andersen	Hellerup IK	Valby BK	7–0 (H)	13 May 1927	
(Denmark) Mogens Larsen	Hellerup IK	Valby BK	7–0 (H)	13 May 1927	
(Denmark) Lund Henriksen^{4}	BK Standard	Frederiksberg BK	7–0 (H)	15 May 1927	
(Denmark) William Nicolaisen	Østerbros BK	BK Borup	5–1 (H)	19 May 1927	
(Denmark) Rygaard	Frederiksberg BK	BK Borup	3–1 (H)	21 May 1927	
(Denmark) Axel Jønsson	BK Viktoria	BK Union	4–2 (A)	29 May 1927	

- ^{4} Player scored 4 goals
- ^{6} Player scored 6 goals

=== Clean sheets ===
Rank	Player	Club	Clean sheets	Ref
1	(Denmark) Karl Christiansen	Handelsstandens BK	5	
2	(Denmark) Alf Nilsson	Hellerup IK	3	
3	(Denmark) Svend Hansen	Frederiksberg BK	1	
3	(Denmark) Holger Jespersen	KFUMs BK	1	
3	(Denmark) Poul Petersen	BK Standard	1	

== Promotion/relegation play-offs ==
The winners of the 1926–27 KBUs B-række, Christianshavns BK (CB) entered the promotion/relegation play-offs against the team with the fewest points in the 1926–27 KBUs A-række. The final league standings of the 1926/27 KBUs A-række had four teams with six points each; BK Borup, BK Union, Valby BK and BK Standard. Unlike BK Borup, BK Union and Valby BK, BK Standard were an extraordinary member (Danish: ekstraordinær deltager) of the league this season, following their promotion from the KBUs B-Række after the 1924–25 season, and the tournament's rules hence stipulated that they were to be the participant in the relegation/promotion play-off. The rules, that had been implemented by the Copenhagen FA effective from the beginning of the 1923–24 season, were designed so that winner of the 1926–27 KBUs B-række had to obtain at least three points (two points for a win, one point for a tie and zero points for a loss) over the course of two play-off matches in order for the team to gain promotion. If Christianshavns BK lost the first play-off match, a second play-off match would not be scheduled.

The first play-off match was played on 28 June 1927 19:15 CET at the exhibition field on Sundby Idrætspark (also referred to as Banen ved Englandsvej, Amager Sportspark or Amagers Idrætsanlæg) — originally the match was scheduled for 23 June 19:00 CET, but moved by the request of both clubs. BK Standard's team line-up for the match consisted of Jens Castberg (goalkeeper), Peter Kastberg, Svend Ekelund, Knud Mortensen, Sidney Ford (born in England), Gahms Henriksen, Poul Jacobsen, H. Chr. Henriksen, Lund Henriksen, Edwin Petersen and Henry Jensen, while Christianhavns BK's team line-up consisted of Harly Andersen (goalkeeper), Einar Eklund, Kaj Petersen, Andreas Hjorth, Einer Nielsen, Karl Jensen, Henry Nielsen, Salomon Nielsen, Otto Møller, Axel Larsen, Chr. Rasmussen. Christianshavns BK lost the first play-off match 3–1, which was attended by 2,000 spectators and which had the players switch sides directly after the conclusion of the first half without a 15 minutes break. Following a missed penalty kick opportunity by Edwin Petersen of BK Standard, the match score remained 1–1 until only 5 minutes before full-time, when BK Standard managed to score twice with goals made by Lund Henriksen and Henry Jensen. Hence Christianshavns BK did not manage to obtain a promotion to the 1927–28 KBUs A-række, while BK Standard secured their spot in the next season of KBUs A-række.

28 June 1927
19:15 CET

BK Standard	3–1	Christianhavns BK
H. Chr. Henriksen 15'; Lund Henriksen 85'; Henry Jensen 88'		Salomon Nielsen 40'

Sundby Idrætspark, Copenhagen
Attendance: 2,000
Referee: Vilhelm Jørgensen (B 1903)

BK Standard	Christianshavns BK

GK	(Denmark) Jens Castberg
DF	(Denmark) Peter Castberg
DF	(Denmark) Svend Ekelund
MF	(Denmark) Knud Mortensen
MF	(England) Sidney Ford
MF	(Denmark) Gahms Henriksen
FW	(Denmark) Henry Jensen
FW	(Denmark) Edwin Petersen
FW	(Denmark) Lund Henriksen
FW	(Denmark) H. Chr. Henriksen
FW	(Denmark) Poul Jacobsen

GK	(Denmark) Harly Andersen
DF	(Denmark) Einar Eklund
DF	(Denmark) Kaj Petersen
MF	(Denmark) Andreas Hjorth
MF	(Denmark) Einer Nielsen
MF	(Denmark) Karl Jensen
FW	(Denmark) Chr. Rasmussen
FW	(Denmark) Axel Larsen
FW	(Denmark) Otto Møller
FW	(Denmark) Salomon Nielsen
FW	(Denmark) Henry Nielsen

Match rules

- 90 minutes.
- Replay match if scores still level after full-time.
- Replay match if Christianshavns BK (CB) wins the match.
- CB needs at least 3 points (1 win and 1 draw) to get promotion.
- No substitutes.
