= Otto Larsen =

Otto Larsen may refer to:

- Otto Larsen (footballer)
- Otto Larsen (sociologist)
