= Sundby Idrætspark =

Association football stadium in Denmark

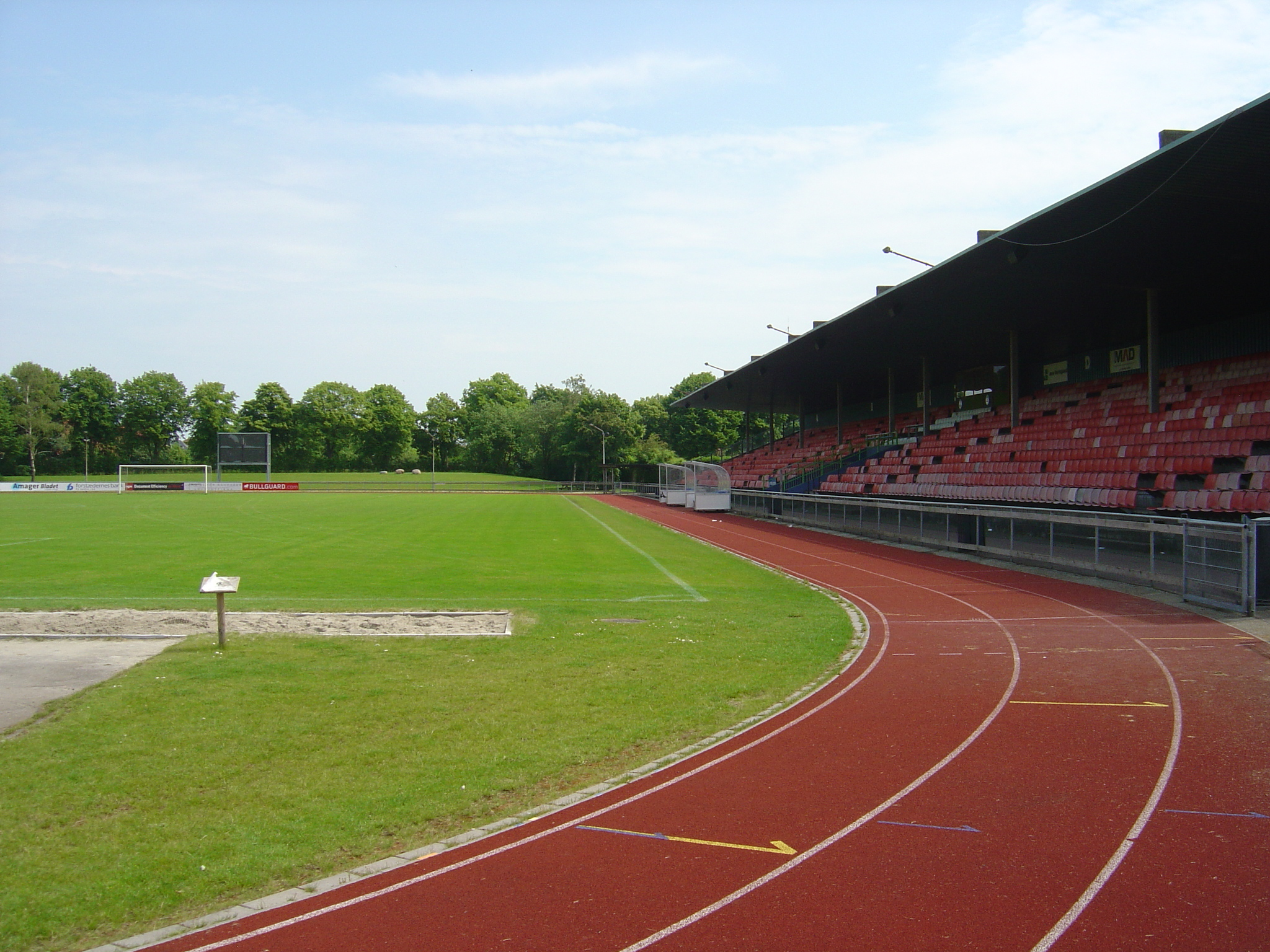
- A view of the stadium's grand stand in June 2007
- Interactive map of Sundby Idrætspark
- Full name: Sundby Idrætspark, opvisningsbanen (Sundby Stadium)
- Former names: Banerne ved Englandsvej; Amager Sportspark (until 1925); Sundby Idrætspark (1925–present)
- Location: Englandsvej 61; 2300 København S
- Coordinates: 55°39′00″N 12°36′08″E
- Owner: Kultur- og Fritidsforvaltningen, Copenhagen Municipality
- Capacity: 7,200 (2,500 seats)
- Surface: Natural grass (1922–2018); Artificial (2018–present)
- Record attendance: Men: 8,391 (BK Fremad Amager vs Esbjerg fB, 5 November 1972); Women: 1,451 (Sundby BK vs F.C. Copenhagen, 21 September 2024)
- Field size: 105 by 68 metres (114.8 yd × 74.4 yd)

Construction
- Built: 1923–1924
- Opened: 10 September 1922; 104 years ago
- Renovated: 1974–1975; 2014–2016; June–August 2018
- Expanded: 1936–1938
- Cost: DKK 120,000 (1922); DKK 450,000 (1936); DKK 4,200,000 (1975)

Tenants
- BK Fremad Amager (1922–present); B 1908 (1922–present); BK Standard (1923–1946); FC Amager (2008–2009); Sundby BK (women) (2021–2023, 2024); Sundby BK (2024–present); B.93 (2022, 2024–2025)

Sundby Idrætspark is a sports complex, that consists of a combined association football and athletics stadium (referred to as Sundby Stadium), three sports halls (referred to as Sundby Idrætshal), tennis courts (clay and synthetic), and a swimming hall (referred to as Sundby Bad), located in the district of Amager Vest, Copenhagen. As of May 2019, the stadium's total capacity of approximately 7,200 spectators, with 2,500 seatings at the main grand stand stretching along one side of the pitch, makes the exhibition field among the 25th largest football stadiums in Denmark. Since the establishment of the facilities in 1922, the site has undergone continuous development through incremental expansion, with new sports facilities added over time in response to evolving demands. As of April 2025, Sundby Idrætspark comprises an area of approximately 16 hectares.

It is the home ground of the association football clubs BK Fremad Amager, B 1908 and Sundby BK, hosting the first senior women's team of Sundby BK in the seasons 2021–22 and 2022–23, and have previously hosted BK Standard (1923–1946) and the professional superstructure FC Amager (2008–2009). Other tenants include the athletic club IF Gullfoss, the volleyball club Amager VK, the floorball club Hafnia FC, the tennis club Sundby Tennisklub|Sundby TK, the badminton club Sundby KFUM BC, the handball club Amager SK and the association football club BK Olympia 1921. Other clubs have rented the stadium to play notable matches there, including Christianshavn IK.

The first international rugby match in Denmark was played between on 19 November 1950 at the stadium of Sundby Idrætspark. The grass fields of the sports complex hosted the preliminary rounds of the 2015 World Archery Championships, where archers shot distances of 50 meters (compound) and 70 meters (recurve) to advance in the competition..

== History ==
=== Background and founding ===
Following industrialization in the early 20th century, a new approach to urban planning emerged. This movement focused on providing light and air in housing developments, ensuring that workers – the emerging social class – could enjoy green spaces and engage in outdoor activities close to their homes. The land located in the triangular area between Irlandsvej, Englandsvej (Note: Englandsvej was called Kirkevej until 1901. When the Sundby districts were incorporated into the Copenhagen Municipality in 1902, many street names had to be changed because identical names already existed within the municipality. Sundbyvestervej was previously known as Møllevej until 1928, while the westernmost part of the road was called Rembrandts Allé until 1929.), and Sundbyvestervej was originally part of the outlying farm known as Bastiansminde — the farm buildings located in the south-western corner were later demolished, only leaving behind four European beech (Fagus sylvatica) trees from the original entrance. As part of the urban development of Sundby, the Municipality of Copenhagen acquired the area in 1923 to create both a park and recreational facilities, which eventually led to the establishment of the nearly three-hectare large Sundbyvester Park (commonly known as Englandsparken, or Irlandsparken) and the sports complex covering over 150,000 m², of which approximately 7,000 m² is building area. The sports complex was established in 1923–1924 by the City of Copenhagen and was transferred on 1 April 1925 to the independent institution Københavns Idrætspark (KI) for management and development, at which time it was given a new official name, Sundby Idrætspark.

The stadium, referred to as Sundby Stadium, was inaugurated on 10 September 1922 with an association football match between the two then best ranking Amager-based teams, BK Fremad Amager and B 1908 in front of a sizeable crowd — a silver trophy donated by wholesaler O. P. Jansen for the occasion was won by B 1908. At the unofficial inauguration in September 1922, the sport's facility, with the entrance located at Englandsvej, consisted of 5 football fields, with one of these fields being specifically fenced and designated for tournament matches. In the period following the park’s unofficial opening, matches were held on one of the smaller fields, as the main field had not yet been prepared for use. An actual exhibition field was inaugurated with its first association football match on 26 April 1925 between a representative team for island of Amager and B 1903, marking the sport complex's take-over by the self-governing institution, KI. Any surplus generated from the match was intended to be allocated to a fund dedicated to the construction of a grandstand. The sports complex now consisted of an exhibition field and four football fields on an area of approximately 6 hectares.

At the corner of Irlandsvej and Sundbyvestervej, a school — Højdevangens Skole — was constructed and inaugurated in 1930, designed by the architect Kai Gottlob. Another school was originally planned for the corner of Englandsvej and Sundbyvestervej, but these plans never came to fruition.

=== First expansion and additions ===
Immediately after the plan for the sports park’s first expansion and new additions had been approved, and a grant of 450,000 DKK (with a three-year financing plan) had been allocated by the Copenhagen City Council in November 1936, earthworks commenced under the supervision of the Municipal Property Directorate. The park’s existing area was expanded by a further 7.5 hectares, bringing the total area to 13.5 hectares. The expanded grounds were to include a main exhibition field with a wooden grandstand, facilities for throwing and jumping events, running tracks, gymnastics areas, a large section for training pitches, and six tennis courts. A sports hall (known as Sundby-Hallen) for tennis and badminton was also constructed, designed so that it could additionally serve as an assembly hall. A topping-out ceremony was held on 7 January 1938 for the covered grandstand erected at the football ground – the new badminton hall was at that point approximately three-quarters complete. The oldest sports hall (hall 1), next to the exhibition field, was designed by architects Arthur Wittmaack and Vilhelm Hvalsøe.

By 1 March 1937, it was expected that all existing leases on the land would have been terminated, so the construction work could fully commence. At a later stage, a building with changing rooms was to be erected, along with a large parking area to the south intended for use by the playing fields.

=== Fires and improvements ===
External image
- Aerial overview of Sundby Idrætspark from July 1948 showing the previous wooden grandstand of the exhibition field and the farm buildings belonging to Bastiansminde.

Sundbyhallen was used the German during the occupation of Denmark in World War II, and got devastated by sabotage and fire on 20 June 1943, and was again destroyed by fire on 23 April 1956, but this time the ignition of a combustible wall cladding was likely caused by a fault in the electrical installation.

BK Fremad Amager moved from the villa district on Irlandsvej to a new single-storey yellow-brick clubhouse on Sundbyvestervej 60 with dressing rooms in the basement, in the south-western corner of Sundby Idrætspark, in 1974. The dismantling of the old wooden grandstand was begun in August 1974 to make way for a new grandstand at a cost of DKK 4,200,000. The new concrete grandstand, with a seating capacity of 1,700, was first used for a top-flight league match on 13 April 1975, when BK Fremad Amager played BK Frem in front of 5,500 spectators. In 1994, a minor renovation and improvement of spectator facilities were carried out at a cost of DKK 300,000. In 1989, Boldklubben 1908’s 400 m² clubhouse was constructed on a site provided by the City of Copenhagen, located on the opposite side of Sundbyvestervej, just outside the sports complex. The clubhouse consisted of three changing rooms, a leased-out cafeteria with kitchen, and a meeting room.

An outdoor swimming pool was initially constructed next to the school, which eventually evolved into the facility known as Sundby Bad after buildings were added on top. The facility was officially inaugurated in 1966. In 1990, the third indoor hall (number 3) was constructed. The hall would lack its own changing rooms, showers, and toilet facilities, with users instead directed to the facilities located in Halls 1 and 2.

When Sundby TK was founded in 1937, the facility had two clay tennis courts. Membership growth over the following decades led to an expansion to four courts by the late 1970s. Around that time, three of the clay courts were replaced with modern synthetic surfaces equipped with floodlighting, installed by Københavns Idrætsanlæg and completed in 1978. This upgrade extended the playing season, allowing tennis to be played from roughly April through October or November. Membership at Sundby TK expanded considerably during the 1980s and 1990s, leading to the construction of a proper clubhouse with a kitchen in 1992, replacing the earlier shelter that had served little more than protection from the rain, and two additional gravel courts in 1996 beside Hall 3 to support the increased activity. In 2010, the tennis complex was further upgraded: much of the perimeter fencing was renewed, and the synthetic playing surfaces were replaced with artificial turf.

=== DBU stadium requirements and dispensations ===
In 2003, the Danish FA published the first edition of "Krav til danske fodboldstadioner" (“Requirements for Danish football stadiums”), which entered into force on 1 July 2003, followed in 2004 by the introduction of a club licensing system that made specific stadium requirements a condition for participation in the top-flight football league and second tier football league. Two years later, football stadiums for third tier football clubs faced similar requirements, which from 1 July 2013 also applied to the women’s top-flight league stadiums.

The gravel pitch, south of the stadium's grand stand, used for training sessions, was upgraded to a full-size 11-a-side artificial football pitch (referred to as K1) in the spring of 2004, and augurated in August 2004. The implementation of this renovation and modernisation resulted in the stadium being approved as a 2nd Division football stadium. The hosting of 2nd Division matches was conditional only upon a DBU dispensation for secured player access, requiring a protected passage between the changing rooms and the pitch; for high-risk matches, a fixed plan for spectator segregation was also required. 1st Division matches could be hosted under a one-year DBU dispensation, with an expected extension of up to three years, as the absence of a floodlighting system and the size of the changing facilities were among the deficiencies identified by the Danish Football Association (DBU).

A budget of DKK 10 million was designated for the stadium's renovation, which was started in 2014 and successfully completed in 2016. The grand stand is reported to have 1,958 seatings. Between June and August 2018, the track of the exhibition venue was converted to Finnish-made MRTX Ultra artificial turf with built-in heating and watering, replacing the original natural grass. Between August and December of 2018, four 40-meter floodlight masts of 1,000 lux were installed at the exhibition field, enabling the broadcasting of televised evening matches from the Danish Superliga — additionally one 24-meter mast and one 20-meter mast delivers a 250 lux LED lighting system meant for training sessions.

B.93's last league match of the 2021–22 season on 11 June 2022 against Hillerød Fodbold was played at Sundby Idrætspark due to an overbooking error. B.93 started playing their home matches temporarily at Sundby Idrætspark beginning from 22 November 2024 due to the renovation of Østerbro Stadium — the first match being against Hobro IK in the 17th round of the Danish 1st Division. Hence, during the last part of the 2024–25, the main exhibition field would host league home matches for teams across the second tier (B.93), third tier (BK Fremad Amager), fourth tier (Sundby BK), and fifth tier (B 1908). The sports complex marked its 100th anniversary on 7 September 2024, celebrated with an event that included an exhibition in the foyer of the main hall highlighting the facility’s history and development, as well as a programme of sports-related activities.

== Stadium firsts and records ==
The earliest known competitive matches at Sundby Idrætspark were reportedly played in late August 1924, when two league fixtures were held at the venue during the 1924–25 season: a KBUs B-række match in which BK Gefion defeated the local team BK Sylvia 2–0, and a KBUs A-række Hellerup IK match where Hellerup IK won 1–0 against B 1908. In the first edition of the Danish national football championship play-offs, the 1927–28 Danmarksmesterskabsturneringen, a preliminary round (1. kreds) match was played at Sundby Idrætspark on 13 November 1927 between BK Fremad Amager and Kjøbenhavns BK. The match ended in a 4–0 victory for the home team in front of 2,000 spectators, with the first goal scored by Knud Kastrup in the 16th minute. Another preliminary round match in the first national championship season, played on 1 April 1928, featured B 1903 and Haslev IF. Acting as the home side, B 1903 secured a 5–0 victory in front of 400 spectators.

The first officially recorded competitive match played on artificial turf (the K1 pitch) at the venue took place on 9 April 2005, when BK Olympia defeated Sundby KFUM 4–0 in KBU Series 2, group 4. The first competitive match on the artificial turf at the main exhibition field was a Danish 1st Division third-round fixture between BK Fremad Amager and Lyngby BK, played on 12 August 2018 and ending in a 2–2 draw. Floodlighting was first used at a 1st Division match between BK Fremad Amager and HB Køge on 25 November 2018, with the home side winning 1–0 in the final match of the autumn season.

A record attendance of 8,391 spectators was recorded at the Danish 2nd Division match on 5 November 1972 between BK Fremad Amager and Esbjerg fB. The match was the final game of the season and determined which team would be relegated to the third tier, with Esbjerg fB being relegated. Boldklubben 1908 recorded a home attendance of 1,881 spectators during the Sundby derby against local rivals BK Fremad Amager in the 19th round of the 2011–12 Danish 2nd Division, group East, on 15 April 2012, a league match which ended in a 0–2 defeat. This represents the highest documented attendance for B 1908 in the modern era. In the Danish Women's 2nd Division match of the 2024–25 season, on 21 September 2024 Sundby BK Women faced F.C. Copenhagen Women in front of 1,451 spectators, setting a new record for the largest crowd attendance at a women's club football game at the stadium. On 10 September 2026, a new home attendance record of 2,247 spectators was set at Sundby Idrætspark for fourth-tier club Sundby BK, despite a 7–0 defeat to top-flight side FC Midtjylland in the third proper round of the 2026–27 edition of the DBU Pokalen, hence improving on the previous record of 1,715 spectators set one year prior on 23 September 2025, in a third proper round cup match against Odense BK.

The record football attendance at Sundby Stadium for a competitive match not involving any local teams is 5,528 spectators, which was set during the third proper round of the 2025–26 DBU Pokalen in a match between second-tier club B.93 and top-flight side Brøndby IF. The host team, B.93, losing the match 1–4.

== Artwork and sculptures ==
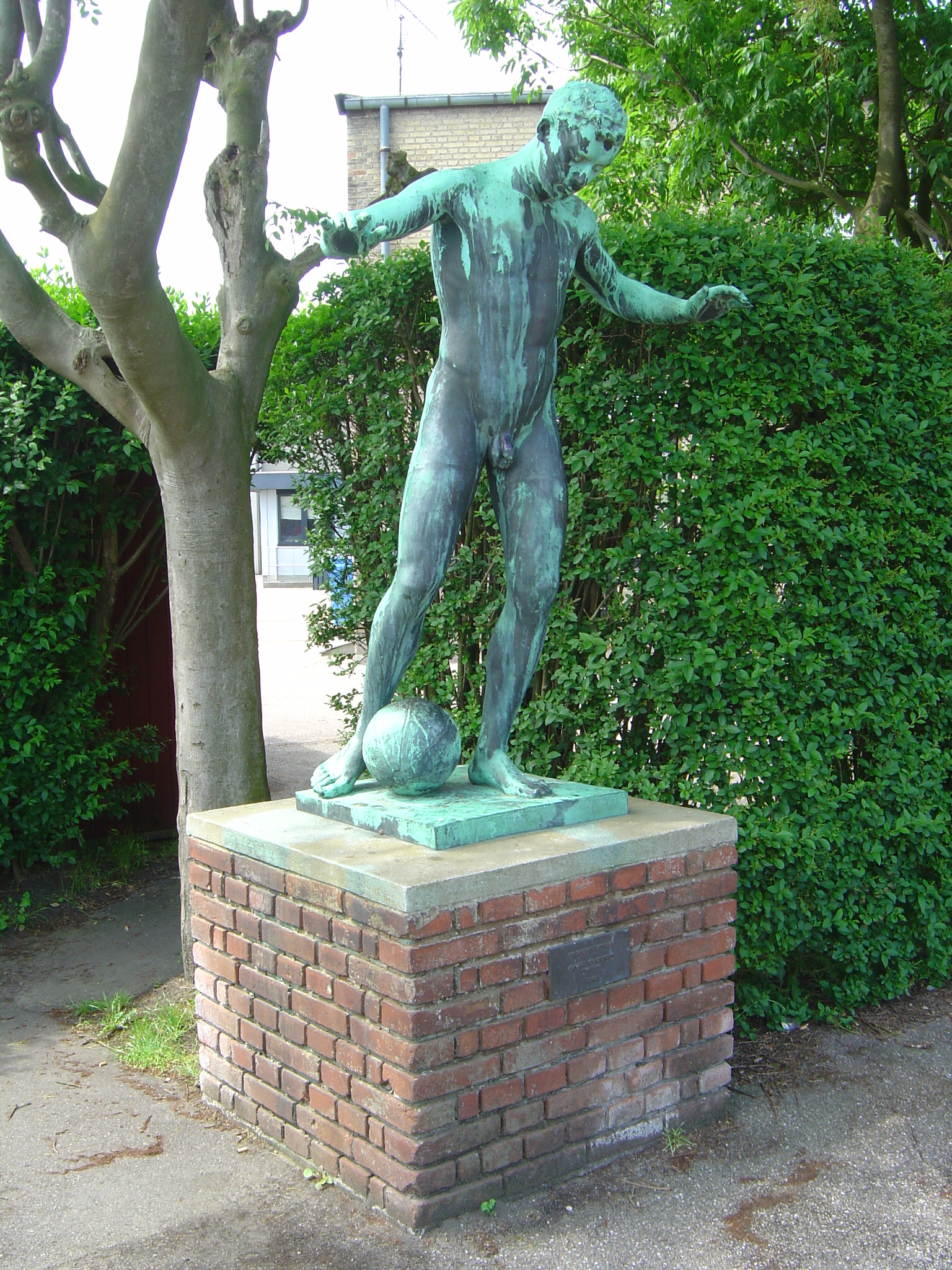
The bronze sculpture "En Fodboldspiller" from 1903 by Carl Mortensen.

The sports complex includes two statues located in the western section of the "stadionbanen". A bronze sculpture by Danish artist Carl Mortensen (1861–1945), named "En Fodboldspiller" (“A Footballer”), is situated on a pedestal in the south-western corner of the stadium. It depicting a male football player in motion, in a forward-leaning stance with imminent interaction with a ball, about to kick or move forward with the ball, rendered with detailed anatomical form and balanced proportions. The work was donated by Freund’s Legacy Fund, first reveiled in plaster in 1903 and awarded the Annual Medal at the Artists’ Autumn Exhibition, before the sculpture was cast in bronze in 1910, installed at the football field of Københavns Idrætspark, and later moved to Sundby Idrætspark.

A second sculpture by Hans Erik Einar Quistgaards (1887–1979), named "Kalchas", from 1915, is situated in the north-western corner of the stadium, representing Kalchas, the seer of Agamemnon’s army in the Trojan War, as described by Homer in the opening of the Iliad. The sculpture depicts the male figure crouching in a compact pose, with the right arm extended forward in a pointing gesture. Originally donated by an anonymous benefactor and erected on the inner field of the stadium at Københavns Idrætspark in 1915, it was relocated to Sundby Idrætspark in 1954 in between the KI’s grandstand expansions in 1953–55.

A contemporary artwork, titled "Motion", was integrated into the exterior of indoor sports Hall 3 and completed on 17 November 2022 after six weeks of work. Measuring 25 × 9 metres, the mural replaced a previously half-faded bluish colour scheme and now depicts two figures—one red and one dark—representing different youths and the sports practices in the park, running at full sprint through a warm field of colour with green nuances. These elements reference the natural landscape of Amager and its sunsets. The façade decoration was created by the artist Andreas Welin, organised by Galleri Rodløs, and supported with DKK 98,800 from Områdefornyelsen Sundby.

At the initiative of Maiken Berg of Kulturpiloterne Amager, a local cultural development programme supporting community-based art and cultural projects on Amager, the Nørrebro-based street artist and graphic designer Mija Byung Siersbæk Simonsen was commissioned in January 2024 to decorate the previously white walls of the foyer to Hall 1 at Sundby Idrætspark. The resulting multi-wall, graffiti-inspired mural was formally unveiled at a vernissage on 25 January 2024, and officially inaugurated by district leader Thomas Bøgh. Simonsen described the work as an exploration of “rooms within rooms”, in which each wall functions as a distinct spatial narrative or portal-like environment intended to spark curiosity and wonder rather than depict recognisable subjects.

== Facilities ==
As of April 2025, Sundby Idrætspark comprises an area of approximately 16 hectares, bordered by the streets Englandsvej, Irlandsvej, Sundbyvestervej, and the listed Englandsparken. Sundby Idrætspark covers an area of approximately 16 hectares and consists of a large outdoor sports complex with a stadium and athletics track, sports halls, a swimming pool, clubhouses, tennis courts, and more. The sports complex's includes the following facilities: 1 stadium, 3 sports halls, 1 clubhouse for an association football club (BK Fremad Amager), 1 clubhouse for a tennis club (Sundby TK), 7 tennis courts, 2 padel courts, 9 full-size 11-a-side football pitches, including the stadium (4 of which are artificial turf), 9 5-a-side football pitches (2 of which are artificial turf), 1 running track (athletics). 1 throwing area (athletics), 1 swimming pool, 1 outdoor fitness area, 143 car parking spaces (including handicap), and icycle parking.

Sundby Idrætspark's main entrance is located at Englandsvej 61, and the main buildings can be accessed (by car) via Englandsvej and Irlandsvej. The sports park is partially enclosed, with designated openings providing path access for pedestrians and cyclists, and a vegetation belt running along Irlandsvej.

=== Athletics and stadium area ===
The exhibition stadium pitch ("Stadionbane") is equipped with floodlightning and the grandstand houses dressing rooms for both teams and referees, press and broadcast areas, VIP sections, storage rooms, and toilet facilities. On the opposite side of the main stand there is a wooden terrace nicknamed as the Sunny Side by the fans of BK Fremad Amager. There are also a couple of smaller terraces at one end of the ground. The stadium has four entrances for paying spectators — three located at the corners and one at the centre of the grandstand, with the north-east and south-east entrances primarily being used for away fans.

Surrounding the stadium’s grass field is an athletics track with long jump and high jump facilities located on the western side. The track is constructed of red synthetic material (a typical rubberised athletics surface) and follows the standard 400-metre layout, measured along the innermost lane. The oval track comprises three lanes encircling the field and includes a straight section widened with two additional lanes, resulting in a total of five marked lanes along the straight.

=== Tennis facilities ===
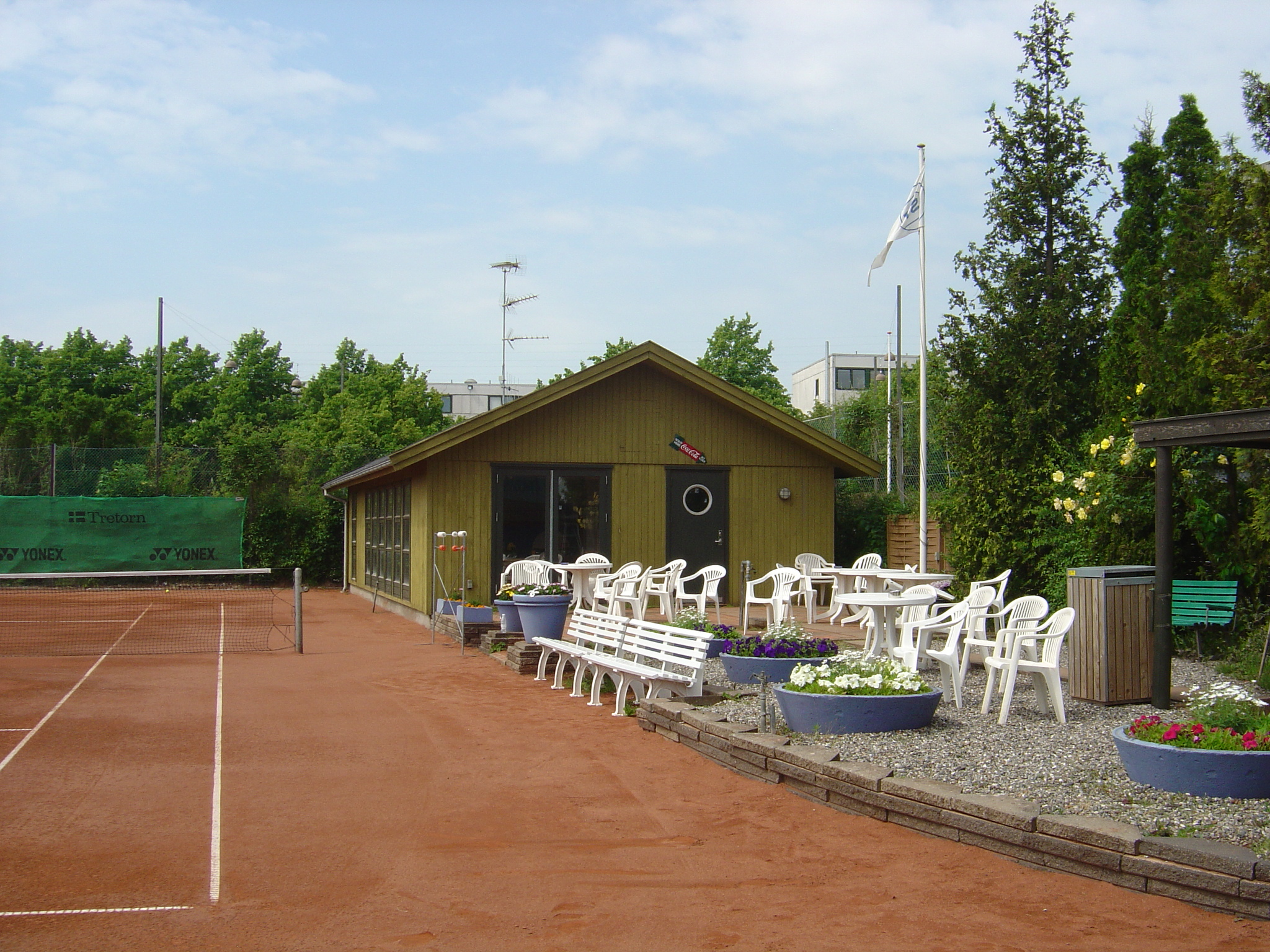
The clubhouse for the sport park's tennis club was inaugurated in 1992.

The tennis facilities at Sundby Idrætspark are operated by Sundby Tennis- og Padelklub for players at multiple levels. On the southern and western side of indoor hall 3 is a dedicated racquet-sports section consisting of five clay courts and two artificial-grass courts, all outdoors situated in the same perimeter fenced complex and used for recreational play, training, and competition. The section also includes two outdoor padel courts.

=== Artificial turf pitches ===
Sundby Idrætspark contains three full-size (11-a-side) artificial turf pitches, designated K1, K2, and K3, aside from the main stadium pitch. These pitches are also marked for 7-a-side and 8-a-side football. In addition, the park has two smaller artificial turf pitches, K4 and K5, designed for 5-a-side football. A pitch 6 is marked as a Pro surface. Comparable floodlighting is also installed at the stadium's artificial turf pitch K1, supporting extended training and match scheduling during evening and low-light conditions. An elevated earth embankment has been constructed along the northern edge of K1. This raised ground functions as an informal spectator area, providing improved viewing conditions for matches on K1.
