= Sylow-Tournament =

- Organiser(s): Danish FA (DBU)
- Founded: 1918; 108 years ago
- Abolished: 1926; 100 years ago
- Region: Bornholm, Copenhagen, Funen, Jutland, Lolland-Falster and Zealand
- Teams: 5 (1918–1920); 6 (1921–1925); 7 (1926)
- Last champions: Copenhagen FA (1926)
- Most championships: Copenhagen FA (5 titles)

Sylow-Tournament (Danish: Sylow-Turneringen) was a knockout association football competition contested annually between 1918 and 1926, organised by the Danish FA (DBU), which determined the championship of the representative teams, referred to as Sylow-teams, of the six Danish regional football associations. The competition was held between the selected teams (Danish: unionshold) of Copenhagen FA, Funen FA, Jutland FA, Lolland-Falster FA and Zealand FA for the first three seasons (1918–1920), before being joined by the Bornholm FA team in 1921 and eventually an additional Copenhagen FA team exclusively composed of players from the KBUs A-række competing in 1926. The 1926 season became the last edition of the Sylow Tournament, which was abolished and replaced by a year-long league format for clubs, known as Danmarksmesterskabsturneringen i Fodbold, the following season. The competition was created in 1918 after a proposal from the chairman of the Danish FA, Louis Østrup, modelled after the Landsfodboldturneringen, and named after a previous chairman of the national organisation, Ludvig Sylow.

The matches in the tournament played a major role in the development of association football outside the Danish capital city. The Denmark national team had been playing official matches since 1908, but the roster consisted solely of players from clubs in Copenhagen, who were leading the development of Danish association football until World War II, and a player from a provincial club only first made it on the roster in 1923. The most successful association in the history of the tournament's 9 editions was Sylow-team of the Copenhagen FA, who by default only participated in the final match, was won the only trophy, distributed during the tournament's history, for permanent ownership. The most capped players from the Copenhagen FA were the forwards Viggo Jørgensen (B 1903) and Einard Larsen (KFUMs BK), while the Copenhagen FA top goalscorer in the entire tournament were the forwards Pauli Jørgensen (BK Frem) and Frithjof Steen (B 1903).

== History ==
The creation of the tournament was proposed at an executive Committee meeting on 26 July 1918 by the newly appointed chairman of the Danish FA, Louis Østrup (1918–1935), and named in honour of the departing chairman of the national organisation, Ludvig Sylow (1911–1918). The tournament would be organised and financed by the Danish FA, would be modelled after the club's Landsfodboldturneringen, that had been created five years earlier, and was to be played by the representative teams (Danish: unionshold; referred to as Sylow-teams) of all 6 regional football associations. On 27 August 1918, the board finally approved of the tournament, which happened after the acceptance of the previous chairman. Initially, the board of the Copenhagen FA had their concerns regarding the new competition, but decided to have a representative team participate. Following the conclusion of the tournament in 1927, the Fredericia Social-Demokrat argued that the major drawbacks surrounding Sylow-matches were to gather the selected teams with players from so many scattered clubs, and making them work as a unit.

In the 1925 final of the tournament, the selection committee decided that the Copenhagen FA team would consist entirely of players from the second highest Copenhagen Football League, the KBUs A-række. The following 1926 tournament, two representative teams for the Copenhagen FA participated in the tournament, each teams composed of players of either the KBUs Mesterskabsrække (almost identical with the national football squad) or the KBUs A-række. The ninth and last edition of the tournament was won by the Copenhagen FA for the fifth time, which meant that the organization obtained five lots and now had the honour of keeping the trophy permanently. The competition was abolished the following season and replaced by the year-long league format for clubs, known as Danmarksmesterskabsturneringen i Fodbold.

== Finals ==
Key	Explanation
(number of cup wins)	A running tally of the total number of titles won by each team is kept in brackets.

Season	Final Date	Winner	Result	Runner-up	Venue	Attendance	Ref
1918	20 October 1918	Copenhagen FA (1)	4–1	Lolland-Falster FA	Københavns Idrætspark, Copenhagen	—N/a	
1919	12 October 1919	Copenhagen FA (2)	6–0	Zealand FA	Københavns Idrætspark, Copenhagen	—N/a	
1920	10 October 1920	Jutland FA (1)	2–0	Copenhagen FA	Københavns Idrætspark, Copenhagen	—N/a	
1921	9 October 1921	Copenhagen FA (3)	4–2	Funen FA	Odense	—N/a	
1922	22 October 1922	Copenhagen FA (4)	2–0	Lolland-Falster FA	Nykøbing Falster	—N/a	
1923	11 November 1923	Jutland FA (2)	1–0	Copenhagen FA	Aarhus Stadium, Aarhus	—N/a	
1924	2 November 1924	Zealand FA (1)	5–2	Copenhagen FA	Københavns Idrætspark, Copenhagen	—N/a	
1925	8 November 1925	Lolland-Falster FA (1)	3–1 (a.e.t.)	Copenhagen FA	Nykøbing Falster Stadium, Nykøbing Falster	1,750	
1926	7 November 1926	Copenhagen FA (5)	8–2	Lolland-Falster FA	Nykøbing Falster	—N/a	

== Performance ==
Association	Seasons	Wins	First final won	Last final won	Runners-up	Last final lost	Total final appearances
Copenhagen FA (KBU)	9	5	1918	1926	4	1925	9
Jutland FA (JBU)	9	2	1920	1923	0	—	2
Lolland-Falster FA (LFBU)	9	1	1925	1925	3	1926	4
Zealand FA (SBU)	9	1	1924	1924	1	1919	2
Funen FA (FBU)	9	0	—	—	1	1921	1
Bornholm FA (BBU)	6	0	—	—	0	—	0
Copenhagen FA (KBU; 2nd team)	1	0	—	—	0	—	0
