= Hermann Brügmann =

Danish athletics competitor

Personal information
- Nationality: Danish
- Born: 2 February 1900
- Died: 9 May 1970 (aged 70)

Sport
- Sport: Athletics
- Events: Long jump Triple jump

Hermann Brügmann (2 February 1900 – 9 May 1970) was a Danish athlete. He competed in the men's long jump and the men's triple jump at the 1928 Summer Olympics.
