= Bernhard Andersen =

Danish footballer (1892–1958)

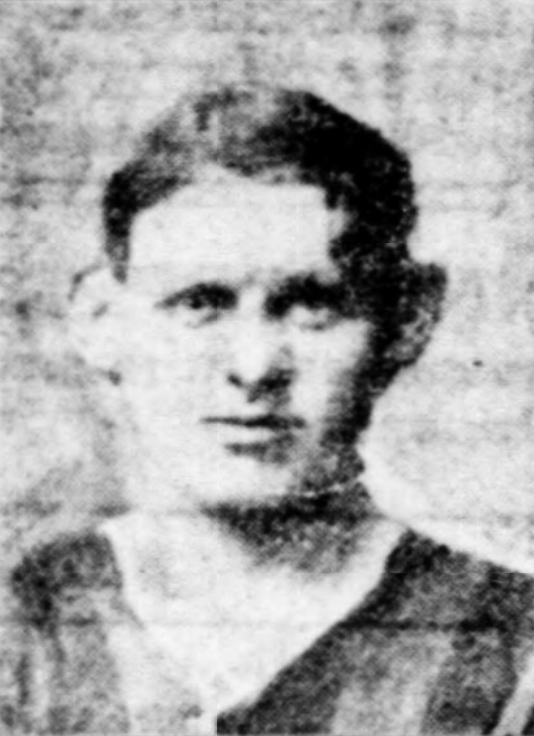
- Andersen in 1916

Personal information
- Full name: Bernhard Vilhelm Andersen
- Date of birth: 5 February 1892
- Place of birth: Copenhagen, Denmark
- Date of death: 9 February 1958 (aged 66)
- Place of death: Copenhagen, Denmark
- Position: Winger

Senior career*
Years	Team	Apps	(Gls)
1914–1917	Velo		
1917–1923?	BK Frem		

International career
1918–1920	Denmark	5	(1)
- * Club domestic league appearances and goals

Bernhard Vilhelm Andersen (5 February 1892 – 9 February 1958) was a Danish footballer who played as an outside forward for the Danish national team.

== Club career ==
Andersen played club football for BK Velo and BK Frem. He won the Danish football championship once, in 1923.

== International career ==
Andersen made his international debut for Denmark on 20 October 1918, in a friendly against Sweden. His first and only goal for his country was scored on 13 June 1920, in a 1–1 draw against Norway.

Andersen's final international appearance came when he represented his country in the men's football tournament at the 1920 Summer Olympics. Denmark were eliminated in the first round by eventual silver medalists Spain.
