= Otto Larsen (footballer) =

Danish footballer (1893–1969)

Personal information
- Full name: Jens Otto Larsen
- Date of birth: 5 April 1893
- Place of birth: Søllerød, Denmark
- Date of death: 23 July 1969 (aged 76)
- Position: Left winger

Senior career*
Years	Team	Apps	(Gls)
1913–1924	Boldklubben Frem	129	(19)
1924–1928	Fremad Amager	22	

International career
1918–1923	Denmark	10	(0)
- * Club domestic league appearances and goals

Jens Otto Larsen (5 April 1893 – 23 July 1969) was a Danish amateur football player with Frem, Fremad Amager and the Danish national team. Larsen was known as a very talented but somewhat inconsistent player. He was part of the Frem team that won the first ever Danish Championship to the club in 1923.

== Honours ==
- Danish Championship: 1922–23 with Frem
