= Ernst Nilsson (footballer) =

Danish footballer (1901–1977)

Ernst Theodor Vilhelm Nilsson (22 September 1901 – 6 January 1977) was a Danish association football player, who played 40 games and scored eight goals for the Danish national team from 1920 to 1937. Born in Copenhagen, Nilsson played as a forward for Copenhagen club B 1903.

Nilsson was the first Danish national team player to be sent off, during a June 1928 match against Norwegian national team.
