= Knud Kastrup =

Danish footballer (1898-1954)

Personal information
- Date of birth: 7 January 1898
- Date of death: 17 October 1954 (aged 56)

International career
Years	Team	Apps	(Gls)
1923–1927	Denmark	5	(0)

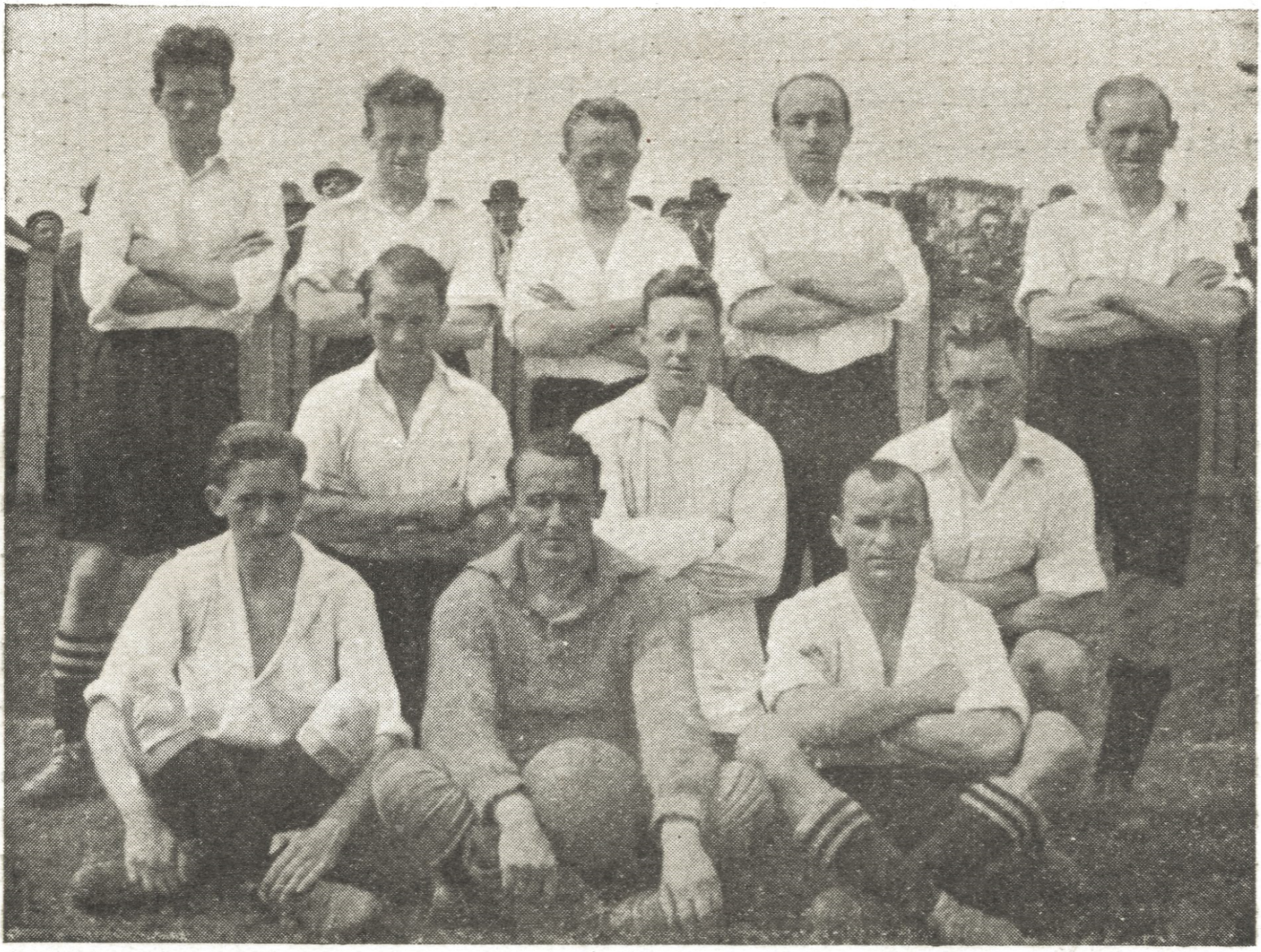
Team line-up of Boldklubben Fremad Amager

Knud Kastrup (7 January 1898 – 17 October 1954) was a Danish footballer. He played in five matches for the Denmark national football team from 1923 to 1927.
