= List of parishes in the Region of Southern Denmark =

This is a list of parishes in the Region of Southern Denmark. As of 2022, there are 2,133 parishes (Danish: Sogne) within the Church of Denmark, 502 of which are within the Region of Southern Denmark. They are listed below by municipality.

== Aabenraa Municipality ==
Map of the parishes in the Aabenraa Municipality.

1. Øster Løgum Parish
2. Hellevad Parish
3. Egvad Parish
4. Rise Parish
5. Løjt Parish
6. Ravsted Parish
7. Hjordkær Parish
8. Aabenraa Parish
9. Bylderup Parish
10. Bjolderup Parish
11. Uge Parish
12. Ensted Parish
13. Felsted Parish
14. Varnæs Parish
15. Burkal Parish
16. Tinglev Parish
17. Kliplev Parish
18. Holbøl Parish
19. Bov Parish

== Assens Municipality ==
Map of the parishes in the Assens Municipality.

1. Rørup Parish
2. Vissenbjerg Parish
3. Kerte Parish
4. Årup Parish
5. Skydebjerg Parish
6. Orte Parish
7. Broholm Parish
8. Bågø Parish
9. Sandager Parish
10. Barløse Parish
11. Ørsted Parish
12. Verninge Parish
13. Tommerup Parish
14. Brylle Parish
15. Gamtofte Parish
16. Holevad Parish
17. Turup Parish
18. Vedtofte Parish
19. Søllested Parish
20. Assens Parish
21. Kærum Parish
22. Søby Parish
23. Flemløse Parish
24. Køng Parish
25. Sønderby Parish
26. Dreslette Parish
27. Hårby Parish
28. Jordløse Parish
29. Helnæs Parish

== Billund Municipality ==
Map of the parishes in the Billund Municipality.

1. Sønder Omme Parish
2. Filskov Parish
3. Grinsted Parish
4. Grene Parish
5. Stenderup Parish
6. Hejnsvig Parish
7. Vorbasse Parish

== Esbjerg Municipality ==
Map of the parishes in the Esbjerg Municipality.

1. Hostrup Parish
2. Hjerting Parish
3. Guldager Parish
4. Bryndum Parish
5. Vester Nebel Parish
6. Sædden Parish
7. Gjesing Parish
8. Kvaglund Parish
9. Skads Parish
10. Grimstrup Parish
11. Vester Nykirke Parish
12. Vejrup Parish
13. Treenigheds Parish
14. Zions Parish
15. Vor Frelsers Parish
16. Grundtvigs Parish
17. Jerne Parish
18. Tjæreborg Parish
19. Sneum Parish
20. Bramming Parish
21. Gørding Parish
22. Darum Parish
23. Hunderup Parish
24. Jernved Parish
25. Vilslev Parish
26. Hjortlund Parish
27. Kalvslund Parish
28. Farup Parish
29. Ribe Parish
30. Sankt Katharine Parish
31. Obbekær Parish
32. Mandø Parish
33. Vester Vedsted Parish
34. Seem Parish
35. Hviding Parish
36. Roager Parish
37. Spandet Parish

== Faaborg-Midtfyn Municipality ==
Map of the parishes in the Faaborg-Midtfyn Municipality.

1. Nørre Lyndelse Parish
2. Årslev Parish
3. Sønder Nærå Parish
4. Rolfsted Parish
5. Nørre Broby Parish
6. Vejle Parish
7. Allested Parish
8. Nørre Søby Parish
9. Sønder Højrup Parish
10. Søllinge Parish
11. Hellerup Parish
12. Sønder Broby Parish
13. Hillerslev Parish
14. Heden Parish
15. Vantinge Parish
16. Gestelev Parish
17. Ringe Parish
18. Ryslinge Parish
19. Gislev Parish
20. Vester Hæsinge Parish
21. Sandholts Lyndelse Parish
22. Øster Hæsinge Parish
23. Espe Parish
24. Herringe Parish
25. Kværndrup Parish
26. Håstrup Parish
27. Svanninge Parish
28. Brahetrolleborg Parish
29. Krarup Parish
30. Horne Parish
31. Fåborg Parish
32. Diernæs Parish
33. Vester Åby Parish
34. Åstrup Parish
35. Lyø Parish
36. Avernakø Parish

== Fredericia Municipality ==
Map of the parishes in the Fredericia Municipality.

1. Herslev Parish
2. Pjedsted Parish
3. Bredstrup Parish
4. Vejlby Parish
5. Hannerup Parish
6. Sankt Michaelis Parish
7. Christians Parish
8. Trinitatis Parish
9. Taulov Parish
10. Erritsø Parish
11. Lyng Parish

== Haderslev Municipality ==
Map of the parishes in the Haderslev Municipality.

1. Oksenvad Parish
2. Sommersted Parish
3. Hjerndrup Parish
4. Fole Parish
5. Gram Parish
6. Nustrup Parish
7. Jegerup Parish
8. Maugstrup Parish
9. Moltrup Parish
10. Bjerning Parish
11. Fjelstrup Parish
12. Højrup Parish
13. Skrydstrup Parish
14. Vojens Parish
15. Hammelev Parish
16. Gammel Haderslev Parish
17. Haderslev Vor Frue Parish
18. Åstrup Parish
19. Vonsbæk Parish
20. Bevtoft Parish
21. Vedsted Parish
22. Hoptrup Parish
23. Sønder Starup Parish
24. Grarup Parish
25. Øsby Parish
26. Vilstrup Parish
27. Halk Parish

== Kerteminde Municipality ==
Map of the parishes in the Kerteminde Municipality.

1. Stubberup Parish
2. Dalby Parish
3. Mesinge Parish
4. Viby Parish
5. Munkebo Parish
6. Kerteminde-Drigstrup Parish
7. Marslev Parish
8. Kølstrup Parish
9. Revninge Parish
10. Birkende Parish
11. Rynkeby Parish
12. Rønninge Parish

== Kolding Municipality ==
Map of the parishes in the Kolding Municipality.

1. Viuf Parish
2. Jordrup Parish
3. Vester Nebel Parish
4. Almind Parish
5. Sønder Vilstrup Parish
6. Lejrskov Parish
7. Harte Parish
8. Bramdrup Parish
9. Eltang Parish
10. Simon Peters Parish
11. Sankt Nicolai Parish
12. Nørre Bjert Parish
13. Skanderup Parish
14. Seest Parish
15. Kristkirkens Parish
16. Brændkjær Parish
17. Vamdrup Parish
18. Hjarup Parish
19. Vonsild Parish
20. Dalby Parish
21. Sønder Bjert Parish
22. Sønder Stenderup Parish
23. Ødis Parish
24. Taps Parish
25. Vejstrup Parish
26. Hejls Parish
27. Stepping Parish
28. Frørup Parish
29. Tyrstrup Parish
30. Aller Parish

== Langeland Municipality ==
Map of the parishes in the Langeland Municipality.

1. Hou Parish
2. Stoense Parish
3. Snøde Parish
4. Bøstrup Parish
5. Tranekær Parish
6. Tullebølle Parish
7. Simmerbølle Parish
8. Rudkøbing Parish
9. Strynø Parish
10. Skrøbelev Parish
11. Longelse Parish
12. Fuglsbølle Parish
13. Lindelse Parish
14. Humble Parish
15. Fodslette Parish
16. Tryggelev Parish
17. Magleby Parish
18. Bagenkop Parish

== Middelfart Municipality ==
Map of the parishes in the Middelfart Municipality.

1. Strib-Røjleskov Parish
2. Vejlby Parish
3. Middelfart Parish
4. Kauslunde Parish
5. Roerslev Parish
6. Asperup Parish
7. Brenderup Parish
8. Gamborg Parish
9. Udby Parish
10. Nørre Aaby Parish
11. Indslev Parish
12. Harndrup Parish
13. Føns Parish
14. Balslev Parish
15. Ejby Parish
16. Fjelsted Parish
17. Ørslev Parish
18. Gelsted Parish
19. Husby Parish
20. Tanderup Parish

== Nordfyn Municipality ==
Map of the parishes in the Nordfyn Municipality.

1. Klinte Parish
2. Krogsbølle Parish
3. Bogense Parish
4. Nørre Sandager Parish
5. Grindløse Parish
6. Nørre Næraa Parish
7. Ore Parish
8. Skovby Parish
9. Guldbjerg Parish
10. Ejlby Parish
11. Melby Parish
12. Nørre Højrup Parish
13. Uggerslev Parish
14. Bederslev Parish
15. Norup Parish
16. Hårslev Parish
17. Særslev Parish
18. Skamby Parish
19. Hjadstrup Parish
20. Otterup Parish
21. Skeby Parish
22. Veflinge Parish
23. Vigerslev Parish
24. Søndersø Parish
25. Lunde Parish
26. Østrup Parish

== Nyborg Municipality ==
Map of the parishes in the Nyborg Municipality.

1. Flødstrup Parish
2. Bovense Parish
3. Ullerslev Parish
4. Aunslev Parish
5. Skellerup Parish
6. Ellinge Parish
7. Kullerup Parish
8. Vindinge Parish
9. Nyborg Parish
10. Herrested Parish
11. Refsvindinge Parish
12. Ellested Parish
13. Ørbæk Parish
14. Frørup Parish
15. Svindinge Parish
16. Langå Parish
17. Øksendrup Parish
18. Hjulby Parish
19. Tårup Parish

== Odense Municipality ==
Map of the parishes in the Odense Municipality.

1. Allesø Parish
2. Lumby Parish
3. Næsbyhoved-Broby Parish
4. Korup Parish
5. Næsby Parish
6. Fredens Parish
7. Seden Parish
8. Agedrup Parish
9. Ubberud Parish
10. Paarup Parish
11. Bolbro Parish
12. Hans Tausens Parish
13. Sankt Hans Parish
14. Vor Frue Parish
15. Vollsmose Parish
16. Åsum Parish
17. Ansgars Parish
18. Sankt Knuds Parish
19. Thomas Kingos Parish
20. Munkebjerg Parish
21. Korsløkke Parish
22. Sanderum Parish
23. Dalum Parish
24. Brændekilde Parish
25. Bellinge Parish
26. Dyrup Parish
27. Hjallese Parish
28. Tornbjerg Parish
29. Fraugde Parish
30. Fangel Parish
31. Stenløse Parish
32. Højby Parish
33. Allerup Parish
34. Davinde Parish
35. Stige Parish

== Svendborg Municipality ==
Map of the parishes in the Svendborg Municipality.

1. Hundstrup Parish
2. Stenstrup Parish
3. Lunde Parish
4. Gudbjerg Parish
5. Gudme Parish
6. Hesselager Parish
7. Kirkeby Parish
8. Brudager Parish
9. Oure Parish
10. Ulbølle Parish
11. Vester Skerninge Parish
12. Ollerup Parish
13. Øster Skerninge Parish
14. Egense Parish
15. Sørup Parish
16. Tved Parish
17. Skårup Parish
18. Vejstrup Parish
19. Sankt Jørgens Parish
20. Sankt Nikolaj Parish
21. Vor Frue Parish
22. Fredens Parish
23. Bregninge Parish
24. Thurø Parish
25. Drejø Parish
26. Landet Parish
27. Bjerreby Parish
28. Lundeborg Parish

== Sønderborg Municipality ==
Map of the parishes in the Sønderborg Municipality.

1. Nordborg Parish
2. Oksbøl Parish
3. Havnberg Parish
4. Svenstrup Parish
5. Egen Parish
6. Notmark Parish
7. Ullerup Parish
8. Sottrup Parish
9. Ulkebøl Parish
10. Augustenborg Parish
11. Ketting Parish
12. Asserbølle Parish
13. Kværs Parish
14. Rinkenæs Parish
15. Gråsten-Adsbøl Parish
16. Nybøl Parish
17. Dybbøl Parish
18. Sankt Marie Parish
19. Christians Parish
20. Hørup Parish
21. Tandslet Parish
22. Egernsund Parish
23. Broager Parish
24. Kegnæs Parish
25. Lysabild Parish

== Tønder Municipality ==
Map of the parishes in the Tønder Municipality.

1. Rejsby Parish
2. Vodder Parish
3. Toftlund Parish
4. Tirslund Parish
5. Rømø Parish
6. Brøns Parish
7. Skærbæk Parish
8. Arrild Parish
9. Branderup Parish
10. Aggerskov Parish
11. Ballum Parish
12. Mjolden Parish
13. Døstrup Parish
14. Nørre Løgum Parish
15. Bedsted Parish
16. Randerup Parish
17. Brede Parish
18. Løgumkloster Parish
19. Højst Parish
20. Sønder Skast Parish
21. Hjerpsted Parish
22. Emmerlev Parish
23. Visby Parish
24. Abild Parish
25. Daler Parish
26. Højer Parish
27. Møgeltønder Parish
28. Tønder Parish
29. Hostrup Parish
30. Ubjerg Parish

== Varde Municipality ==
Map of the parishes in the Varde Municipality.

1. Lønne Parish
2. Nørre Nebel Parish
3. Lydum Parish
4. Strellev Parish
5. Ølgod Parish
6. Henne Parish
7. Ovtrup Parish
8. Lunde Parish
9. Kvong Parish
10. Horne Parish
11. Tistrup Parish
12. Skovlund Parish
13. Ål Parish
14. Janderup Parish
15. Varde Parish
16. Thorstrup Parish
17. Hodde Parish
18. Ansager Parish
19. Næsbjerg Parish
20. Øse Parish
21. Vester Starup Parish
22. Oksby Parish
23. Billum Parish
24. Alslev Parish
25. Grimstrup Parish
26. Årre Parish
27. Fåborg Parish
28. Agerbæk Parish
29. Ho Parish

== Vejen Municipality ==
Map of the parishes in the Vejen Municipality.

1. Åstrup Parish
2. Lindknud Parish
3. Bække Parish
4. Veerst Parish
5. Holsted Parish
6. Brørup Parish
7. Læborg Parish
8. Gesten Parish
9. Føvling Parish
10. Folding Parish
11. Malt Parish
12. Askov Parish
13. Vejen Parish
14. Andst Parish
15. Lintrup Parish
16. Hjerting Parish
17. Skrave Parish
18. Skodborg Parish
19. Sønder Hygum Parish
20. Rødding Parish
21. Jels Parish
22. Øster Lindet Parish

== Vejle Municipality ==
Map of the parishes in the Vejle Municipality.

1. Thyregod Parish
2. Vester Parish
3. Øster Nykirke Parish
4. Give Parish
5. Givskud Parish
6. Hvejsel Parish
7. Ringive Parish
8. Lindeballe Parish
9. Gadbjerg Parish
10. Jelling Parish
11. Kollerup Parish
12. Vindelev Parish
13. Grejs Parish
14. Randbøl Parish
15. Nørup Parish
16. Bredsten Parish
17. Skibet Parish
18. Hover Parish
19. Hornstrup Parish
20. Sankt Johannes Parish
21. Vor Frelsers Parish
22. Nørremarks Parish
23. Bredballe Parish
24. Engum Parish
25. Sankt Nikolaj Parish
26. Mølholm Parish
27. Egtved Parish
28. Ødsted Parish
29. Jerlev Parish
30. Højen Parish
31. Vinding Parish
32. Skærup Parish
33. Gauerslund Parish
34. Øster Starup Parish
35. Smidstrup Parish
36. Gårslev Parish

== Ærø Municipality ==
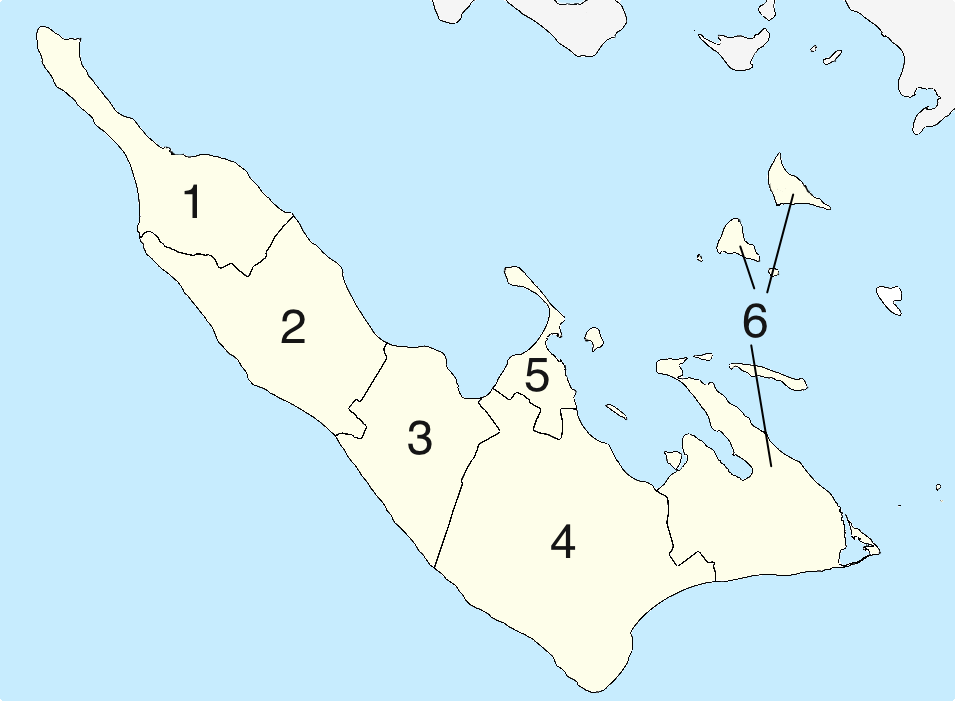
Map of the parishes in the Ærø Municipality.

1. Søby Parish
2. Bregninge Parish
3. Tranderup Parish
4. Rise Parish
5. Ærøskøbing Parish
6. Marstal Parish
