= List of parishes in the Central Denmark Region =

This is a list of parishes in the Central Denmark Region. As of 2022, there are 2,133 parishes (Danish: Sogn) within the Church of Denmark, approximately 507 of which are within the Central Denmark Region. They are listed below by municipality.

== Aarhus Municipality ==
- Astrup Parish
- Beder Parish
- Borum Parish
- Brabrand Parish
- Christians Parish
- Egå Parish
- Elev Parish
- Ellevang Parish
- Elsted Parish
- Framlev Parish
- Fredens Parish
- Fårup Parish
- Gellerup Parish
- Harlev Parish
- Hasle Parish
- Helligånds Parish
- Hjortshøj Parish
- Holme Parish
- Hvilsted Parish
- Kasted Parish
- Kolt Parish
- Langenæs Parish
- Lisbjerg Parish
- Lyngby Parish
- Lystrup Parish
- Malling Parish
- Mejlby Parish
- Møllevang Parish
- Mårslet Parish
- Ormslev Parish
- Ravnsbjerg Parish
- Risskov Parish
- Sabro Parish
- Sankt Johannes Parish
- Sankt Lukas Parish
- Sankt Markus Parish
- Sankt Pauls Parish
- Skejby Parish
- Skelager Parish
- Skjoldhøj Parish
- Skæring Parish
- Skødstrup Parish
- Skåde Parish
- Spørring Parish
- Sønder Årslev Parish
- Tilst Parish
- Todbjerg Parish
- Tranbjerg Parish
- Trige Parish
- Tulstrup Parish
- Vejlby Parish
- Viby Parish
- Vitved Parish
- Vor Frue Parish
- Ølsted Parish
- Åby Parish
- Aarhus Parish

== Favrskov Municipality ==
- Aidt Parish
- Foldby Parish
- Gerning Parish
- Granslev Parish
- Grundfør Parish
- Hadbjerg Parish
- Hadsten Parish
- Haldum Parish
- Hammel Parish
- Haurum Parish
- Houlbjerg Parish
- Hvorslev Parish
- Lading Parish
- Laurbjerg Parish
- Lerbjerg Parish
- Langå Parish
- Nørre Galten Parish
- Over og Neder Hadsten Parish
- Rud Parish
- Røgen Parish
- Sall Parish
- Skjød Parish
- Sporup Parish
- Søby Parish
- Søften Parish
- Sønder Vinge Parish
- Torsø Parish
- Ulstrupbro Parish
- Vejerslev Parish
- Vellev Parish
- Vester Velling Parish
- Vissing Parish
- Vitten Parish
- Voldby Parish
- V0ldum Parish
- Ødum Parish

== Hedensted Municipality ==
- As Parish
- Barrit Parish
- Bjerre Parish
- Daugård Parish
- Glud Parish
- Hammer Parish
- Hedensted Parish
- Hjarnø Parish
- Hornborg Parish
- Hornum Parish
- Hvirring Parish
- Juelsminde Parish
- Klakring Parish
- Klejs Parish
- Korning Parish
- Langskov Parish
- Linnerup Parish
- Løsning Parish
- Nebsager Parish
- Rårup Parish
- Sindbjerg Parish
- Skjold Parish
- Stenderup Parish
- Store Dalby Parish
- Stouby Parish
- Tørring Parish
- Uldum Parish
- Urlev Parish
- Vrigsted Parish
- Aale Parish
- Ølsted Parish
- Ørum Parish
- Øster Snede Parish

== Herning Municipality ==
- Arnborg Parish
- Assing Parish
- Aulum Parish
- Fasterholt Parish
- Feldborg Parish
- Fredens Parish
- Gjellerup Parish
- Grove Parish
- Gullestrup Parish
- Haderup Parish
- Haunstrup Parish
- Hedeager Parish
- Herning Parish
- Hodsager Parish
- Ilderhede Parish
- Karstoft Parish
- Kollund Parish
- Kølkær Parish
- Nøvling Parish
- Rind Parish
- Sankt Johannes Parish
- Simmelkær Parish
- Skarrild Parish
- Snejbjerg Parish
- Studsgård Parish
- Sunds Parish
- Sønder Felding Parish
- Timring-Tiphede Parish
- Tjørring Parish
- Vildbjerg Parish
- Vind Parish
- Vinding Parish
- Ørnhøj Parish
- Ørre-Sinding Parish

== Holstebro Municipality ==
- Borbjerg Parish
- Bur Parish
- Ejsing Parish
- Ellebæk Parish
- Gørding Parish
- Handbjerg Parish
- Herrup Parish
- Hogager Parish
- Holstebro Parish
- Husby Parish
- Idom-Råsted Parish
- Madum Parish
- Mejdal Parish
- Mejrup Parish
- Måbjerg Parish
- Naur Parish
- Nørre Felding Parish
- Nørrelands Parish
- Ryde Parish
- Sahl Parish
- Sevel Parish
- Sir Parish
- Staby Parish
- Sønder Nissum Parish
- Trandum Parish
- Tvis Parish
- Ulfborg Parish
- Vemb Parish
- Vinderup Parish

== Horsens Municipality ==
- Brædstrup Parish
- Endelave Parish
- Føvling Parish
- Gangsted Parish
- Grædstrup Parish
- Hansted Parish
- Hatting Parish
- Kattrup Parish
- Klostersogn
- Lundum Parish
- Nebel Parish
- Nim Parish
- Sønder Vissing Parish
- Sønderbro Parish
- Søvind Parish
- Tamdrup Parish
- Tolstrup Parish
- Torsted Parish
- Træden Parish
- Tyrsted Parish
- Tyrsting Parish
- Tønning Parish
- Underup Parish
- Uth Parish
- Vedslet Parish
- Vor Frelsers Parish
- Vær Parish
- Yding Parish
- Ørridslev Parish
- Østbirk Parish

== Ikast-Brande Municipality ==
- Blåhøj Parish
- Bording Parish
- Brande Parish
- Christianshede Parish
- Ejstrup Parish
- Engesvang Parish
- Faurholt Parish
- Fonnesbæk Parish
- Gludsted Parish
- Hampen Parish
- Ikast Parish
- Ilskov Parish
- Isenvad Parish
- Klovborg Parish
- Nørre Snede Parish
- Skærlund Parish
- Uhre Parish

== Lemvig Municipality ==
- Bøvling Parish
- Dybe Parish
- Engbjerg Parish
- Fabjerg Parish
- Ferring Parish
- Fjaltring Parish
- Flynder Parish
- Gudum Parish
- Harboøre Parish
- Heldum Parish
- Hove Parish
- Hygum Parish
- Lemvig Parish
- Lomborg-Rom Parish
- Møborg Parish
- Nees Parish
- Nørlem Parish
- Nørre Nissum Parish
- Ramme Parish
- Thyborøn Parish
- Trans Parish
- Tørring Parish
- Vandborg Parish

== Norddjurs Municipality ==
- Anholt Parish
- Auning Parish
- Enslev Parish
- Estruplund Parish
- Fausing Parish
- Fjellerup Parish
- Ginnerup Parish
- Gjerrild Parish
- Gjesing Parish
- Glesborg Parish
- Grenaa Parish
- Hammelev Parish
- Hemmed Parish
- Hoed Parish
- Holbæk Parish
- Homå Parish
- Karlby Parish
- Kastbjerg Parish
- Lyngby-Albøge Parish
- Nørager Parish
- Rimsø Parish
- Stenvad Parish
- Udby Parish
- Veggerslev Parish
- Vejlby Parish
- Vejlby Parish
- Vester Alling Parish
- Villersø Parish
- Vivild Parish
- Voer Parish
- Voldby Parish
- Ålsø Parish
- Ørsted Parish
- Ørum Parish
- Øster Alling Parish

=== Former parishes ===
- Albøge Parish
- Lyngby Parish

== Odder Municipality ==
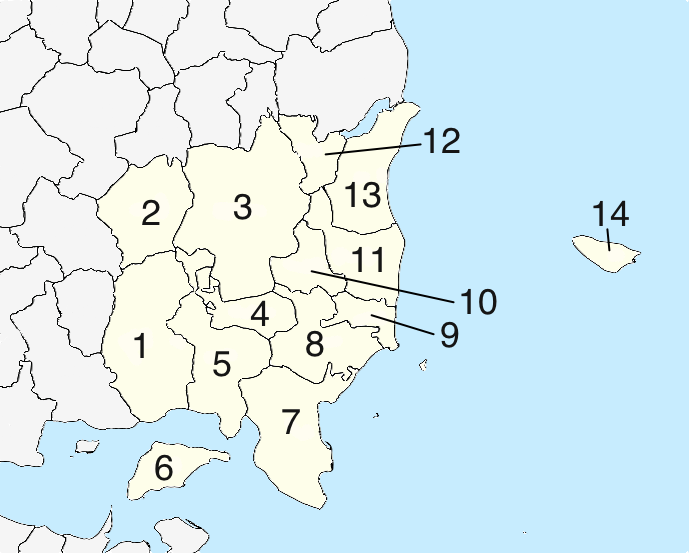
Map of the parishes in the Odder Municipality.

1. Hundslund Parish
2. Torrild Parish
3. Odder Parish
4. Ørting Parish
5. Falling Parish
6. Alrø Parish
7. Gylling Parish
8. Gosmer Parish
9. Halling Parish
10. Randlev Parish
11. Bjerager Parish
12. Nølev Parish
13. Saksild Parish
14. Tunø Parish

== Randers Municipality ==
- Albæk Parish
- Asferg Parish
- Borup Parish
- Dalbyneder Parish
- Dalbyover Parish
- Dronningborg Parish
- Enghøj Parish
- Enslev Parish
- Essenbæk Parish
- Fårup Parish
- Gassum Parish
- Gimming Parish
- Gjerlev Parish
- Grensten Parish
- Hald Parish
- Harridslev Parish
- Haslund Parish
- Helstrup Parish
- Hornbæk Parish
- Hørning Parish
- Kastbjerg Parish
- Kousted Parish
- Kristrup Parish
- Kærby Parish
- Langå Parish
- Lem Parish
- Linde Parish
- Læsten Parish
- Mellerup Parish
- Nørbæk Parish
- Råby Parish
- Råsted Parish
- Sankt Andreas Parish
- Sankt Clemens Parish
- Sankt Mortens Parish
- Sankt Peders Parish
- Spentrup Parish
- Støvring Parish
- Sødring Parish
- Sønderbæk Parish
- Torup Parish
- Tvede Parish
- Tånum Parish
- Udbyneder Parish
- Virring Parish
- Vorup Parish
- Værum Parish
- Ålum Parish
- Årslev Parish
- Ølst Parish
- Ørum Parish
- Øster Bjerregrav Parish
- Øster Tørslev Parish
- Øster Velling Parish

== Ringkøbing-Skjern Municipality ==
- Brejning Parish
- Bølling Parish
- Dejbjerg Parish
- Egvad Parish
- Faster Parish
- Finderup Parish
- Fjelstervang Parish
- Gammel Parish
- Hanning Parish
- Haurvig Parish
- Hee Parish
- Hemmet Parish
- Herborg Parish
- Hoven Parish
- Hover Parish
- Hvide Sande Parish
- Lem Parish
- Lyne Parish
- Lyngvig Parish
- Lønborg Parish
- No Parish
- Ny Parish
- Nørre Bork Parish
- Nørre Omme Parish
- Nørre Vium Parish
- Rindum Parish
- Ringkøbing Parish
- Skjern Parish
- Stadil Parish
- Stauning Parish
- Sædding Parish
- Sønder Bork Parish
- Sønder Borris Parish
- Sønder Lem Parish
- Sønder Vium Parish
- Tarm Parish
- Tim Parish
- Torsted Parish
- Troldhede Parish
- Vedersø Parish
- Velling Parish
- Videbæk Parish
- Vorgod Parish
- Væggerskilde Parish
- Ådum Parish
- Ølstrup Parish

== Samsø Municipality ==
Map of the parishes in the Samsø Municipality.

1. Nordby Parish
2. Onsbjerg Parish
3. Besser Parish
4. Kolby Parish
5. Tranebjerg Parish

== Silkeborg Municipality ==
- Alderslyst Parish
- Balle Parish
- Bryrup Parish
- Dallerup Parish
- Funder Parish
- Gjern Parish
- Grathe Parish
- Grønbæk Parish
- Gødvad Parish
- Hinge Parish
- Hørup Parish
- Kragelund Parish
- Lemming Parish
- Levring Parish
- Linå Parish
- Mariehøj Parish
- Sejling Parish
- Sejs-Svejbæk Parish
- Serup Parish
- Silkeborg Parish
- Sinding Parish
- Sjørslev Parish
- Skannerup Parish
- Skorup Parish
- Svostrup Parish
- Them Parish
- Thorning Parish
- Tvilum Parish
- Vinderslev Parish
- Vinding Parish
- Virklund Parish
- Vium Parish
- Voel Parish
- Vrads Parish

== Skanderborg Municipality ==
- Adslev Parish
- Alling Parish
- Blegind Parish
- Dover Parish
- Fruering Parish
- Galten Parish
- Gammel Rye Parish
- Hylke Parish
- Hørning Parish
- Mesing Parish
- Ovsted Parish
- Ry Parish
- Sjelle Parish
- Skanderborg Parish
- Skanderborg Parish
- Skivholme Parish
- Skjørring Parish
- Skovby Parish
- Stilling Parish
- Stjær Parish
- Storring Parish
- Tulstrup Parish
- Tåning Parish
- Veng Parish
- Vitved Parish
- Voerladegård Parish

== Skive Municipality ==
- Balling Parish
- Brøndum Parish
- Brøndum-Hvidbjerg Parish
- Dommerby Parish
- Durup Parish
- Dølby Parish
- Egeris Parish
- Estvad Parish
- Estvad-Rønbjerg Parish
- Fur Parish
- Glyngøre Parish
- Grinderslev Parish
- Grønning Parish
- Harre Parish
- Hem Parish
- Hindborg Parish
- Hjerk Parish
- Hvidbjerg Parish
- Håsum Parish
- Højslev Parish
- Jebjerg Parish
- Jebjerg-Lyby Parish
- Junget Parish
- Krejbjerg Parish
- Lem Parish
- Lihme Parish
- Lundø Parish
- Lyby Parish
- Nautrup Parish
- Oddense Parish
- Otting Parish
- Ramsing Parish
- Resen Parish
- Roslev Parish
- Rybjerg Parish
- Rødding Parish
- Rønbjerg Parish
- Selde Parish
- Skive Parish
- Skive Parish
- Sæby Parish
- Thise Parish
- Thorum Parish
- Tøndering Parish
- Vejby Parish
- Vile Parish
- Volling Parish
- Åsted Parish
- Ørslevkloster Parish
- Ørum Parish

== Struer Municipality ==
- Asp Parish
- Fousing Parish
- Gimsing Parish
- Hjerm Parish
- Hjerm Østre Parish
- Humlum Parish
- Hvidbjerg Parish
- Jegindø Parish
- Lyngs Parish
- Odby Parish
- Resen Parish
- Struer Parish
- Søndbjerg Parish
- Vejrum Parish
- Venø Parish
- Ølby Parish

== Syddjurs Municipality ==
- Agri Parish
- Bregnet Parish
- Ebdrup Parish
- Ebeltoft-Dråby-Handrup Parish
- Egens Parish
- Feldballe Parish
- Fuglslev Parish
- Halling Parish
- Helgenæs Parish
- Hornslet Parish
- Hvilsager Parish
- Hyllested Parish
- Knebel Parish
- Koed Parish
- Kolind Parish
- Krogsbæk Parish
- Lime Parish
- Marie Magdalene Parish
- Mygind Parish
- Mørke Parish
- Nimtofte-Tøstrup Parish
- Nødager Parish
- Rolsø Parish
- Rosmus Parish
- Skader Parish
- Skarresø Parish
- Skørring Parish
- Søby Parish
- Thorsager Parish
- Tirstrup Parish
- Tved Parish
- Vistoft Parish

== Viborg Municipality ==
- Almind Parish
- Asmild Parish
- Bigum Parish
- Bjerring Parish
- Bjerringbro Parish
- Brandstrup Kirkedistrikt
- Daugbjerg Parish
- Dollerup Parish
- Elsborg Parish
- Finderup Parish
- Fiskbæk Parish
- Fly Parish
- Frederiks Parish
- Gammelstrup Parish
- Gullev Parish
- Hammershøj Parish
- Hersom Parish
- Hjermind Parish
- Hjorthede Parish
- Houlkær Parish
- Hvam Parish
- Højbjerg Parish
- Iglsø Parish
- Karup Parish
- Klejtrup Parish
- Kobberup Parish
- Kvols Parish
- Kvorning Parish
- Lee Parish
- Lindum Parish
- Lynderup Parish
- Lysgård Parish
- Låstrup Parish
- Løvel Parish
- Mammen Parish
- Mønsted Parish
- Nørre Vinge Parish
- Pederstrup Parish
- Ravnstrup Parish
- Resen Parish
- Romlund Parish
- Roum Parish
- Rødding Parish
- Sahl Parish
- Skals Parish
- Skjern Parish
- Smollerup Parish
- Sparkær Parish
- Stoholm Parish
- Sønder Rind Parish
- Søndermark Parish
- Søndre Parish
- Tapdrup Parish
- Tjele Parish
- Tårup Parish
- Ulbjerg Parish
- Vammen Parish
- Vejrum Parish
- Vester Bjerregrav Parish
- Vester Tostrup Parish
- Vestervang Parish
- Viborg Domsogn
- Vindum Parish
- Vinkel Parish
- Viskum Parish
- Vorde Parish
- Vorning Parish
- Vridsted Parish
- Vroue Parish
- Ørum Parish
