= Langenæs Parish =

Parish in Aarhus Municipality, Denmark

Langenæs Parish Langenæs Sogn
- Parish
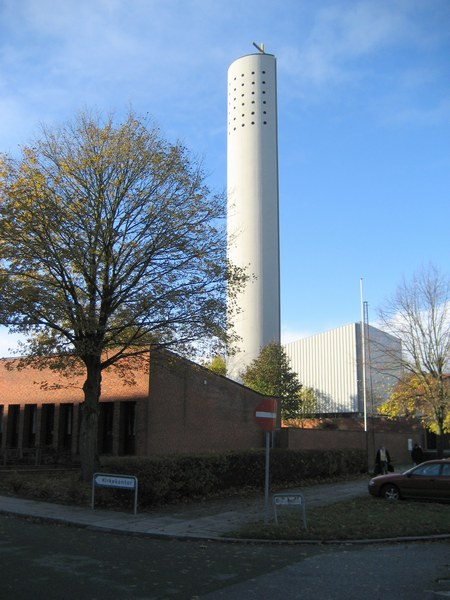
- Langenæs Church
- Interactive map of Langenæs Parish
- Coordinates: 56.14°N 10.18°E
- Country: Denmark
- Region: Central Denmark
- Municipality: Aarhus Municipality
- Diocese: Aarhus

Population (2025)
  - Total: 6,840
- Parish number: 8119

Langenæs Parish (Danish: Langenæs Sogn) is a parish in the Diocese of Aarhus in Aarhus Municipality, Denmark. The parish is occupied by the neighborhood of Langenæs.
