= List of parishes in the North Jutland Region =

This is a list of parishes in the North Jutland Region. As of 2022, there are 2,133 parishes (Danish: Sogne) within the Church of Denmark, approximately 353 of which are within the North Jutland Region. They are listed below by municipality.

== Aalborg Municipality ==
- Ajstrup Parish
- Ansgars Parish
- Bislev Parish
- Budolfi Parish
- Dall Parish
- Ejdrup Parish
- Ellidshøj Parish
- Farstrup Parish
- Ferslev Parish
- Frejlev Parish
- Gistrup Parish
- Godthåb Parish
- Gudum Parish
- Gudumholm Parish
- Gunderup Parish
- Hals Parish
- Hammer Parish
- Hans Egedes Parish
- Hasseris Parish
- Horsens Parish
- Hou Parish
- Hvorup Parish
- Komdrup Parish
- Lillevorde Parish
- Lindholm Parish
- Lundby Parish
- Margrethe Parish
- Mou Parish
- Nibe Parish
- Nørholm Parish
- Nørre Kongerslev Parish
- Nørre Tranders Parish
- Nørresundby Parish
- Nøvling Parish
- Romdrup-Klarup Parish
- Rørdal Parish
- Sankt Markus Parish
- Sebber Parish
- Sejlflod Parish
- Skalborg Parish
- Store Ajstrup Parish
- Storvorde Parish
- Sulsted Parish
- Svenstrup Parish
- Sønder Kongerslev Parish
- Sønder Tranders Parish
- Sønderholm Parish
- Ulsted Parish
- Vadum Parish
- Vejgaard Parish
- Vester Hassing Parish
- Vesterkær Parish
- Vodskov Parish
- Vokslev Parish
- Volsted Parish
- Vor Frelsers Parish
- Vor Frue Parish
- Øster Hassing-Gåser Parish

== Brønderslev Municipality ==
- Agersted Parish
- Asaa Parish
- Brønderslev Parish
- Dorf Parish
- Dronninglund Parish
- Hallund Parish
- Hellevad Parish
- Hellum Parish
- Hjallerup Parish
- Jerslev Parish
- Melholt Parish
- Mylund Parish
- Serritslev Parish
- Stenum Parish
- Tise Parish
- Tolstrup Parish
- Voer Parish
- Ørum Parish
- Øster Brønderslev Parish
- Øster Hjermitslev Parish

== Frederikshavn Municipality ==
- Abildgård Parish
- Albæk-Lyngså Parish
- Bangsbostrand Parish
- Elling Parish
- Flade Parish
- Frederikshavn Parish
- Gærum Parish
- Hulsig Parish
- Hørby Parish
- Jerup Parish
- Karup Parish
- Kvissel Parish
- Råbjerg Parish
- Skagen Parish
- Skærum Parish
- Skæve Parish
- Sæby Parish
- Torslev Parish
- Understed Parish
- Volstrup Parish
- Åsted Parish
- Østervrå Parish

== Hjørring Municipality ==
- Asdal Parish
- Astrup Parish
- Bindslev Parish
- Bistrup Parish
- Bjergby Parish
- Børglum Parish
- Em Parish
- Harritslev Parish
- Hirtshals Parish
- Horne Parish
- Hæstrup Parish
- Hørmested Parish
- Jelstrup Parish
- Lendum Parish
- Lyngby Parish
- Løkken-Furreby Parish
- Mosbjerg Parish
- Mygdal Parish
- Mårup Parish
- Rakkeby Parish
- Rubjerg Parish
- Sankt Catharinæ Parish
- Sankt Hans Parish
- Sankt Olai Parish
- Sejlstrup Parish
- Sindal Parish
- Skallerup Parish
- Sørig Parish
- Tolne Parish
- Tornby Parish
- Tversted Parish
- Tårs Parish
- Uggerby Parish
- Ugilt Parish
- Vejby Parish
- Vennebjerg Parish
- Vidstrup Parish
- Vrejlev Parish
- Vrensted Parish
- Vrå Parish

== Jammerbugt Municipality ==
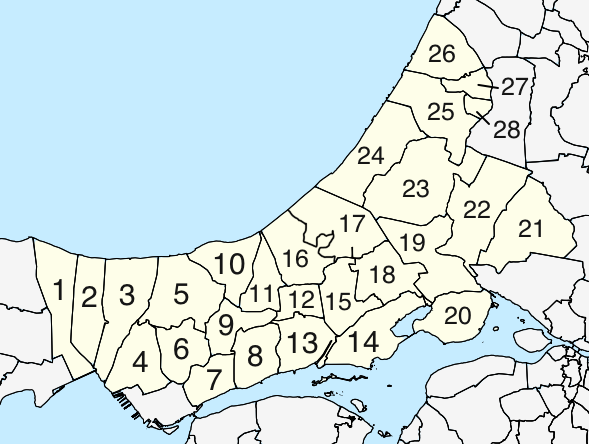
Map of parishes within Jammerbugt Municipality.

1. Vust Parish
2. Vester Torup Parish
3. Klim Parish
4. Gøttrup Parish
5. Kollerup-Fjerritslev Parish
6. Kettrup Parish
7. Bejstrup Parish
8. Haverslev Parish
9. Skræm Parish
10. Hjortdal Parish
11. Lerup Parish
12. Øster Svenstrup Parish
13. Torslev Parish
14. Øland Parish
15. Brovst Parish
16. Tranum Parish
17. Koldmose Parish
18. Langeslund Parish
19. Vedsted Parish
20. Gjøl Parish
21. Biersted Parish
22. Aaby Parish
23. Jetsmark Parish
24. Hune Parish
25. Saltum Parish
26. Ingstrup Parish
27. Vester Hjermitslev Parish
28. Alstrup Parish

== Læsø ==
- Byrum Parish
- Hals Parish
- Vesterø Parish

== Mariagerfjord Municipality ==
- Als Parish
- Arden Parish
- Astrup Parish
- Døstrup Parish
- Falslev-Vindblæs Parish
- Glenstrup Parish
- Hem Parish
- Hobro Parish
- Hvilsom Parish
- Hvornum Parish
- Hørby Parish
- Mariager Parish
- Nørre Onsild Parish
- Oue Parish
- Rold Parish
- Rostrup Parish
- Sem Parish
- Skelund Parish
- Skjellerup Parish
- Snæbum Parish
- Storarden Parish
- Svenstrup Parish
- Sønder Onsild Parish
- Valsgaard Parish
- Vebbestrup Parish
- Vester Tørslev Parish
- Visborg Parish
- Vive-Hadsund Parish
- Øls Parish
- Øster Hurup Parish

== Morsø Municipality ==
- Agerø Parish
- Alsted Parish
- Bjergby Parish
- Dragstrup Parish
- Ejerslev Parish
- Elsø Parish
- Erslev Parish
- Flade Parish
- Frøslev Parish
- Galtrup Parish
- Hvidbjerg Parish
- Jørsby Parish
- Karby Parish
- Ljørslev Parish
- Lødderup Parish
- Mollerup Parish
- Nykøbing M Parish
- Ovtrup Parish
- Rakkeby Parish
- Redsted Parish
- Sejerslev Parish
- Skallerup Parish
- Solbjerg Parish
- Sundby Parish
- Sønder Dråby Parish
- Tæbring Parish
- Tødsø Parish
- Vejerslev Parish
- Vester Assels Parish
- Ørding Parish
- Øster Assels-Blidstrup Parish
- Øster Jølby Parish

== Rebild Municipality ==
- Binderup Parish
- Blenstrup Parish
- Brorstrup Parish
- Bælum Parish
- Durup Parish
- Fræer Parish
- Gerding Parish
- Gravlev Parish
- Grynderup Parish
- Haverslev Parish
- Kongens Tisted Parish
- Lyngby Parish
- Ravnkilde Parish
- Rørbæk Parish
- Siem Parish
- Skibsted Parish
- Skørping Parish
- Solbjerg Parish
- Stenild Parish
- Store Brøndum Parish
- Støvring Parish
- Suldrup Parish
- Sønderup Parish
- Sørup Parish
- Terndrup Parish
- Torup Parish
- Veggerby Parish
- Aarestrup Parish
- Øster Hornum Parish

== Thisted Municipality ==
- Agger Parish
- Arup Parish
- Bedsted-Grurup Parish
- Boddum Parish
- Hansted Parish
- Harring Parish
- Hassing Parish
- Helligsø-Gettrup Parish
- Heltborg Parish
- Hillerslev Parish
- Hjardemål Parish
- Hundborg Parish
- Hunstrup Parish
- Hurup Parish
- Hvidbjerg Vesten Å Parish
- Hørdum Parish
- Hørsted Parish
- Jannerup Parish
- Kallerup Parish
- Klitmøller Parish
- Kåstrup Parish
- Lild Parish
- Lodbjerg Parish
- Nors Parish
- Nørhå Parish
- Ræhr Parish
- Sennels Parish
- Sjørring Parish
- Skinnerup Parish
- Skjoldborg Parish
- Skyum Parish
- Snedsted Parish
- Stagstrup Parish
- Stenbjerg Parish
- Sønderhå Parish
- Thisted Parish
- Thorsted Parish
- Tilsted Parish
- Tved Parish
- Tømmerby Parish
- Vang Parish
- Vesløs Parish
- Vester Vandet Parish
- Vestervig Parish
- Vigsø Parish
- Villerslev Parish
- Visby Parish
- Vorupør Parish
- Ydby Parish
- Ørum Parish
- Øsløs Parish
- Øster Vandet Parish
- Østerild Parish

== Vesthimmerland Municipality ==
- Aggersborg Parish
- Alstrup Parish
- Blære Parish
- Farsø Parish
- Fjelsø Parish
- Flejsborg Parish
- Fovlum Parish
- Gedsted Parish
- Gislum Parish
- Giver Parish
- Gundersted Parish
- Havbro Parish
- Hyllebjerg Parish
- Kornum Parish
- Louns Parish
- Løgsted Parish
- Løgstør Parish
- Malle Parish
- Næsborg Parish
- Oudrup Parish
- Overlade Parish
- Ranum Parish
- Salling Parish
- Simested Parish
- Skivum Parish
- Strandby Parish
- Svingelbjerg Parish
- Testrup Parish
- Ullits Parish
- Ulstrup Parish
- Vester Hornum Parish
- Vesterbølle Parish
- Vilsted Parish
- Vindblæs Parish
- Vognsild Parish
- Aalestrup Parish
- Aars Parish
- Østerbølle Parish
