= List of shipwrecks in April 1844 =

The list of shipwrecks in April 1844 includes ships sunk, foundered, wrecked, grounded, or otherwise lost during April 1844.

== 1 April ==
List of shipwrecks: 1 April 1844
Ship	State	Description
Ada	United Kingdom	The ship was wrecked on the Longships, off the coast of Cornwall. Her crew were rescued. She was on a voyage from Newport, Monmouthshire, to Penzance, Cornwall.
Helen	United Kingdom	The ship ran aground 8 nautical miles (15 km) east of Marsala, Sicily. She was on a voyage from London to Malta.
Wohlfahrt	Flag unknown	The ship was driven ashore on the south west coast of "Seelam". She was on a voyage from Haderslev, Denmark, to the Weser. She was refloated and resumed her voyage in a leaky condition.

== 2 April ==
List of shipwrecks: 2 April 1844
Ship	State	Description
Alice	United Kingdom	The ship was abandoned in the North Sea off the north Kent coast with some loss of life.
Baltimore	United States	The ship was driven ashore at Memel, Prussia. She was on a voyage from Memel to London, United Kingdom.
Elida	Norway	The ship ran aground and was damaged leaving Svelvik. She put back to Svelvik.
Helen	United Kingdom	The ship was driven ashore on Edisto Island, South Carolina, United States, and was abandoned by her crew.
Koninginn	Prussia	The ship ran aground at Memel. She was on a voyage from Memel to Bristol, Gloucestershire, United Kingdom. She was refloated and taken in to Memel.
Penelope	United Kingdom	The ship ran aground and was damaged leaving Svelvik. She put back to Svelvil.
Stadt	Netherlands	The steamship was holed and sank at Vlissingen, Zeeland. She was refloated.
Stillman	United Kingdom	The ship was wrecked off Whydah, Dahomey with the loss of two of her crew. She was on a voyage from Belfast, County Antrim, to Whydah.

== 3 April ==
List of shipwrecks: 3 April 1844
Ship	State	Description
Frances	United Kingdom	The brig ran aground on the Woolcombe Sands, off the north coast of Devon. She was on a voyage from Cork to London. She was on a voyage from British Honduras to London. She had become a wreck by 4 April.
Queen or Queen Mary	United Kingdom	The ship ran aground off Heligoland. She was refloated and resumed her voyage.
Queen of Scotland	United Kingdom	The paddle steamer ran aground off Heligoland. She was on a voyage from Hull, Yorkshire, to Hamburg. She was refloated and resumed her voyage.
Rapid	United Kingdom	The ship was driven ashore at "Laguna". She was on a voyage from Laguna to Cobh, County Cork.

== 4 April ==
List of shipwrecks: 4 April 1844
Ship	State	Description
Marida	United Kingdom	The ship ran aground on "Lappen". She was refloated.
Tecumseh	United States	The ship was driven ashore at Trinidad. She was refloated.
William Skyrme	United Kingdom	The ship was holed by her anchor and sank at Tralee, County Kerry. She was on a voyage from Tralee to Dublin. She was refloated on 6 April.

== 5 April ==
List of shipwrecks: 5 April 1844
Ship	State	Description
James Harris	United Kingdom	The barque was sunk by ice in the Atlantic Ocean (46°19′N 49°00′W) with the loss of one of her thirteen crew. Survivors were rescued by L'Encarnet (France). James Harris was on a voyage from London to Quebec City, Province of Canada, British North America. Also reported as 25 April.
Jane	United Kingdom	The brig foundered in the Atlantic Ocean (38°15′N 9°40′W). Her crew were rescued by the schooner Greyhound (United Kingdom). Jane was on a voyage from Newport, Monmouthshire, to Barcelona, Spain.
Senora de Conceicão	Portugal	The brigantine ran aground at Figueira da Foz. She was on a voyage from Figueira da Foz to Bahia, Brazil.

== 6 April ==
List of shipwrecks: 6 April 1844
Ship	State	Description
Ann Eliza	United Kingdom	The ship was wrecked at the mouth of the Danube. Her crew were rescued. She was on a voyage from an English port to Constantinople, Ottoman Empire. She had been refloated by 1 May.
Friendship	United Kingdom	The ship ran aground on the Gunfleet Sand, in the North Sea off the coast of Essex. She was on a voyage from South Shields, County Durham, to London. She was refloated and put in to Wivenhoe, Essex.
Hercules	United Kingdom	The paddle steamer ran aground in the River Avon. She was on a voyage from Bristol, Gloucestershire, to Llanelly, Glamorgan.
Neptunus	Hamburg	The ship was abandoned in the Atlantic Ocean. Her crew were rescued. She was on a voyage from New York, United States, to Amsterdam, North Holland, Netherlands.

== 7 April ==
List of shipwrecks: 7 April 1844
Ship	State	Description
Dolphin	United States	The ship was in collision with Martha Washington (United States) and sank at New York. She was on a voyage from New York to Halifax, Nova Scotia, British North America.
Hilda Mathilda	Sweden	The ship was wrecked on the Skagen Reef. Her crew were rescued. She was on a voyage from London, United Kingdom, to Stockholm.
Tintern	United Kingdom	The ship ran aground off Margate, Kent. She was on a voyage from London to Barbados. She was refloated.

== 8 April ==
List of shipwrecks: 8 April 1844
Ship	State	Description
Helen	United Kingdom	The ship was driven ashore on Sicily. She was on a voyage from London to Malta. She was later refloated.
Splendid	United Kingdom	The ship ran aground off Gigha.
Venus	Norway	The ship was driven ashore on Anholt, Denmark. She was refloated on 15 April and put in to Copenhagen, Denmark.

== 9 April ==
List of shipwrecks: 9 April 1844
Ship	State	Description
Oremus	Denmark	The ship was wrecked on "Hepeloe". Her crew were rescued. She was on a voyage from Hamburg to Roskilde.
Peace	United Kingdom	The brig was sunk by ice in the Atlantic Ocean (46°52′N 46°30′W). Her crew were rescued from an ice floe on 18 April by Copernicus (Bremen).
Pieternella	Prussia	The ship was driven ashore at Tylstrup, Denmark. Her crew were rescued. She was on a voyage from Rotterdam, South Holland, Netherlands, to Königsberg.

== 10 April ==
List of shipwrecks: 10 April 1844
Ship	State	Description
Ane Margrethe	Denmark	The ship ran aground on the Vedsteen. She was on a voyage from Stubbekøbing to an English port. She was refloated and put in to Fredrikshavn.
Pilot	United Kingdom	The ship was destroyed by fire at the mouth of the River Ythan.
Portia	United Kingdom	The ship was driven ashore near "Thornby", Denmark. She was on a voyage from Hartlepool, County Durham, to Memel, Prussia. She was refloated but consequently sank.

== 11 April ==
List of shipwrecks: 11 April 1844
Ship	State	Description
Fancy	United Kingdom	The ship ran aground on the Doom Bar. She was on a voyage from Newport, Monmouthshire, to Brixham, Devon. She was refloated.
King William	United Kingdom	The ship was driven ashore on Flotta, Orkney Islands, and sank. She was on a voyage from Liverpool, Lancashire, to Stettin. She was refloated on 15 April and beached at Stromness to be repaired.
Rapid	United Kingdom	The ship sank at Hubberstone Pill, Pembrokeshire. She was on a voyage from Liverpool, Lancashire, to Wells-next-the-Sea, Norfolk. She was refloated the next day and taken in to Milford Haven, Pembrokeshire.
Rosebud	United Kingdom	The ship ran aground on the Swine Bottoms. She was on a voyage from Stockton-on-Tees, County Durham, to a Baltic port. She was refloated the next day and taken in to Helsingør, Denmark, for repairs.

== 12 April ==
List of shipwrecks: 12 April 1844
Ship	State	Description
Ann	United Kingdom	The ship was driven ashore by ice at Pillau, Prussia. She was refloated.
Lord Nelson	United Kingdom	The ship sank in the Irish Sea 10 nautical miles (19 km) off St Bees Head, Cumberland. Her crew were rescued. She was on a voyage from Whitehaven, Cumberland, to the Duddon Estuary.
Northumberland	(United Kingdom of Great Britain and Ireland) New South Wales	The cutter was wrecked at the mouth of the Manning River. Her crew were rescued.

== 13 April ==
List of shipwrecks: 14 April 1844
Ship	State	Description
Lord Dalmeny	United Kingdom	The brig was driven ashore by ice at Pillau, Kingdom of Prussia. She was refloated on 16 April.
Providence	United Kingdom	The ship sprang a leak and was beached at Grimsby, Lincolnshire.
Venus	United Kingdom	The ship was driven ashore by ice at Pillau. She was refloated the next day.

== 14 April ==
List of shipwrecks: 14 April 1844
Ship	State	Description
Corinna	Portugal	The sloop struck a floating log whilst on a voyage from Faial Island to Flores Island, Azores. She consequently sank on arrival. Her crew were rescued.
Jane	United Kingdom	The ship ran aground and capsized in the Humber at Brough, Yorkshire. Her crew were rescued. She was on a voyage from Goole to Hessle Cliff.
Nautilus	United Kingdom	The ship was wrecked on the Anegada Reef. Her crew were rescued. She was on a voyage from Saint Lucia to London.
Zephyr	United Kingdom	The ship was driven ashore and wrecked on Heligoland. Her crew were rescued. She was on a voyage from Messina, Sicily, to Hamburg. She was refloated on 20 April.

== 15 April ==
List of shipwrecks: 15 April 1844
Ship	State	Description
Prince Albert	United Kingdom	The ship was damaged by ice and abandoned in the Atlantic Ocean. Her crew were rescued by Trafalgar (United Kingdom). Prince Albert was on a voyage from Halifax, Nova Scotia, British North America, to Liverpool, Lancashire.

== 16 April ==
List of shipwrecks: 16 April 1844
Ship	State	Description
Eleonore	(United Kingdom of Great Britain and Ireland) Jersey	The brig ran aground on No Man's Land, in the Solent.
Johann Wilhelm	Sweden	The ship ran aground off Skagen, Denmark. She was on a voyage from Gothenburg to Guernsey, Channel Islands. She was refloated and put back to Gothenburg.
London	United Kingdom	The ship ran aground at Pillau, Prussia. She was on a voyage from London to Pillau.
Spraycombe	United Kingdom	The ship struck rocks in the Bristol Channel and foundered. Her crew were rescued. She was on a voyage from Bridgwater, Somerset, to Swansea, Glamorgan.

== 17 April ==
List of shipwrecks: 17 April 1844
Ship	State	Description
British King	United Kingdom	The ship was driven ashore on the coast of Sweden. She was on a voyage from Dundee, Forfarshire, to Riga, Russia.

== 18 April ==
List of shipwrecks: 18 April 1844
Ship	State	Description
Clio	Denmark	The ship ran aground off Skagen. She was on a voyage from "Greenae" to London, United Kingdom. She was refloated on 20 April.
Columbine	United Kingdom	The ship was wrecked on the Saugor Sand, India. Her crew were rescued.

== 19 April ==
List of shipwrecks: 19 April 1844
Ship	State	Description
George Welsford	United Kingdom	The ship was abandoned in the Atlantic Ocean. Her crew were rescued. She was on a voyage from Weymouth, Dorset, to Quebec City, Province of Canada, British North America.
Pilot	United Kingdom	The ship was destroyed by fire at the mouth of the River Ythan.

== 20 April ==
List of shipwrecks: 20 April 1844
Ship	State	Description
George Palmer	United Kingdom	The ship was driven ashore by ice at Memel, Prussia. She was refloated.
Madona di Montenegro di Niesi	Kingdom of Sardinia	The ship was wrecked on the north coast of Menorca, Spain, with the loss of seven of her twelve crew. She was on a voyage from Genoa to Algiers, Algeria.
New Volunteer	United Kingdom	The ship was driven ashore 4 nautical miles (7.4 km) west of Málaga, Spain. She was on a voyage from Málaga to Cádiz.

== 22 April ==
List of shipwrecks: 22 April 1844
Ship	State	Description
Erin	(United Kingdom of Great Britain and Ireland) New Zealand	The schooner was wrecked 20 miles (32 km) east of Cape Palliser, New Zealand, when it struck a rock. All hands were saved.
George Palmer	United Kingdom	The ship was driven ashore at Memel, Prussia. She was refloated.
Kincardineshire	United Kingdom	The ship was driven ashore on Bornholm, Denmark. She was on a voyage from Aberdeen to Riga, Russia. She was later refloated and resumed her voyage.
Pallas	United Kingdom	The ship was driven ashore and damaged on Flotta, Orkney Islands. She was on a voyage from Newcastle upon Tyne to America. She was refloated.
Sir William Cumming	United Kingdom	The ship was driven ashore and wrecked on Flotta. She was on a voyage from Nairn to Liverpool, Lancashire.

== 23 April ==
List of shipwrecks: 24 April 1844
Ship	State	Description
Concurrent	United Kingdom	The ship was wrecked near "Packerort" with the loss of a crew member. She was on a voyage from Messina, Sicily, to Reval, Russia.
Isabella	United Kingdom	The ship was driven ashore at Cape Palos, Spain. Her crew were rescued. She was on a voyage from Livorno, Grand Duchy of Tuscany, to Plymouth, Devon.

== 24 April ==
List of shipwrecks: 24 April 1844
Ship	State	Description
Bandicoot	(United Kingdom of Great Britain and Ireland) Van Diemen's Land	The schooner was driven ashore between The Heads and George Town. She was refloated on 27 April and taken into Launceston.
Julius	Sweden	The ship was in collision with a sloop and was abandoned by her crew. She was on a voyage from "Jernavik" to Malmö.
Marshall	United Kingdom	The ship was lost off the west coast of Jutland near "Laurvig". She was on a voyage from London to Königsberg, Prussia.
Patriot	United Kingdom	The ship was driven ashore at "Tannager", Norway. She was on a voyage from Fraserburgh, Aberdeenshire, to a Baltic port. She was refloated and taken in to Tannager.
Star	United Kingdom	The ship was driven ashore and wrecked at Dunnet Head, Caithness. Her crew were rescued. She was on a voyage from Liverpool, Lancashire, to Dingwall, Ross-shire.
St. John	(United Kingdom of Great Britain and Ireland) British North America	The ship was driven ashore in the Dardanelles near Koum Kali, Ottoman Empire. She was on a voyage from Cardiff, Glamorgan, to Constantinople, Ottoman Empire. She was consequently condemned.

== 25 April ==
List of shipwrecks: 25 April 1844
Ship	State	Description
Amor	United Kingdom	The ship was driven ashore at Thisted, Denmark. Her crew were rescued. She was on a voyage from London to a Baltic port.
Frederikke	Denmark	The ship ran aground on a reef off Læsø and was abandoned by her crew. She was on a voyage from Newcastle upon Tyne, Northumberland, United Kingdom, to Copenhagen.
John Woodall	United Kingdom	The ship caught fire and was scuttled in the River Thames at Tilbury Fort, Essex. She was on a voyage from London to Calcutta, India. She was refloated on 28 April and taken in to London.
Marshall	United Kingdom	The ship was driven ashore at Thisted. Her crew were rescued. She was on a voyage from London to Königsberg, Prussia.
Portia	United Kingdom	The barque was driven ashore and wrecked at Hjørring, Denmark.
Triton	United Kingdom	The ship ran aground in the Eider. She was on a voyage from London to Friedrichstadt, Duchy of Schleswig.

== 26 April ==
List of shipwrecks: 26 April 1844
Ship	State	Description
Kangaroo	(United Kingdom of Great Britain and Ireland) New South Wales	The steamship ran aground in the Parramatta River. She was on a voyage from Parramatta to Sydney.
Louisa	United Kingdom	The sloop sprang a leak and sank in the English Channel. She was on a voyage from Plymouth, Devon, to Southampton, Hampshire.
Princess	United Kingdom	The ship ran aground at Antigua. She was on a voyage from the Rio Grande to London.

== 27 April ==
List of shipwrecks: 27 April 1844
Ship	State	Description
Aviso	Spain	The ship ran aground at Puerta Mala. She was refloated the next day.
Forth	United Kingdom	The ship departed from Manila, Spanish East Indies, for Falmouth, Cornwall. No further trace, presumed foundered with the loss of all hands.
Heart of Oak	United Kingdom	The ship was driven ashore at Clee Ness, Lincolnshire. She was on a voyage from Hull, Yorkshire, to Scarborough, Yorkshire. She was refloated and resumed her voyage.
Jane Martell	(United Kingdom of Great Britain and Ireland) Jersey	The ship was lost near Arichat, Nova Scotia, British North America. She was on a voyage from Jersey to Arichat.
Jessie Ritchie	United Kingdom	The ship was wrecked on the Jardine Reefs. She was on a voyage from Liverpool, Lancashire, to Havana, Cuba.
Patriot	United Kingdom	The ship struck a rock and was damaged at Stavanger, Norway. She was on a voyage from Fraserburg, Aberdeenshire, to a Baltic port. She put in to Stavanger.
Teazer	United Kingdom	The ship was wrecked on the Jardine Reefs. She was on a voyage from Trinidad to Boston, Massachusetts.
Waterman No.10	United Kingdom	The steamship ran aground and sank at Hastings, Sussex. She was refloated on 29 April.

== 28 April ==
List of shipwrecks: 28 April 1844
Ship	State	Description
Lavinia	United Kingdom	The ship was driven ashore at Padstow, Cornwall. She was on a voyage from Falmouth, Cornwall, to Newport, Monmouthshire. She was refloated.

== 29 April ==
List of shipwrecks: 29 April 1844
Ship	State	Description
Jane and Margaret	United Kingdom	The ship struck the Batten Reef, off the coast of Devon. She was on a voyage from Bangor to Shoreham-by-Sea, Sussex. She was refloated.
Logan	United States	The ship was sighted whilst on a voyage from Manila, Spanish East Indies, to Boston, Massachusetts. No further trace, presumed foundered with the loss of all hands; probably during a typhoon between 1 and 3 May.
Morning Star	(United Kingdom of Great Britain and Ireland) British North America	The ship was wrecked near Chéticamp, Nova Scotia. Her crew were rescued.
Prince of Wales	United Kingdom	The ship ran aground in Stangate Creek. She was on a voyage from Surinam to London.

== 30 April ==
List of shipwrecks: 30 April 1844
Ship	State	Description
Amelia	United Kingdom	The ship was wrecked at St. Bernardino Point with the loss of six lives. She was on a voyage from Sydney, New South Wales, to Manila, Spanish East Indies.
Thomas Lambert	United Kingdom	The ship was driven ashore near Wexford. She was on a voyage from Newport, Monmouthshire, to Wexford.

== Unknown date ==
List of shipwrecks: Unknown date in April 1844
Ship	State	Description
Ashantee	United Kingdom	The brig was wrecked at Assinie, Ivory Coast. Her crew were rescued.
Bridget Timmens	United Kingdom	The ship was abandoned in the Atlantic Ocean. She was on a voyage from Saint John, New Brunswick, British North America, to an English port. She was subsequently towed in to Salem, Massachusetts, United States, in a waterlogged condition.
Gladiator	United Kingdom	The ship was driven ashore at Sandy Hook, New Jersey, United States. She was on a voyage from London to New York, United States. She was refloated, and arrived at New York on 19 April.
Jane Walker	United Kingdom	The ship was abandoned in the Atlantic Ocean before 13 April.
Margaretta	United Kingdom	The sloop sank at Cardigan.
