= Ajstrup Parish =

Parish in Aalborg Municipality, Denmark

Ajstrup Parish Ajstrup Sogn
- Parish
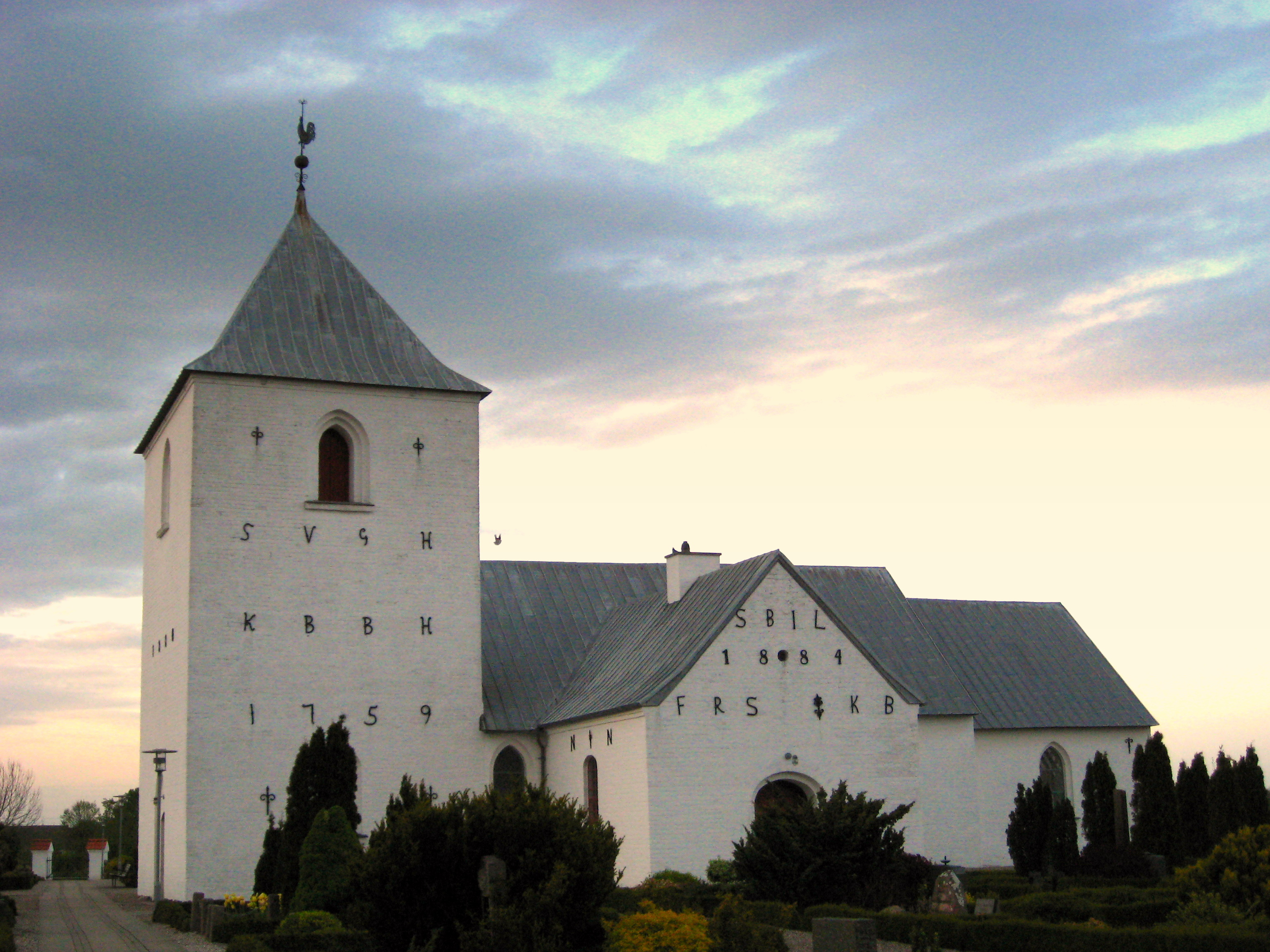
- Ajstrup Church
- Interactive map of Ajstrup Parish
- Coordinates: 57°10′N 9°57′E
- Country: Denmark
- Region: North Jutland
- Municipality: Aalborg Municipality
- Diocese: Aalborg

Population (2025)
  - Total: 2,046
- Parish number: 8382

Ajstrup Parish (Danish: Ajstrup Sogn) is a parish in the Diocese of Aalborg in Aalborg Municipality, Denmark. The parish contains the town of Tylstrup and the villages of Ajstrup and Milbakken.
