= Egvad Parish, Ringkøbing-Skjern Municipality =

Parish in Ringkøbing-Skjern Municipality, Denmark

Egvad Parish Egvad Sogn
- Parish
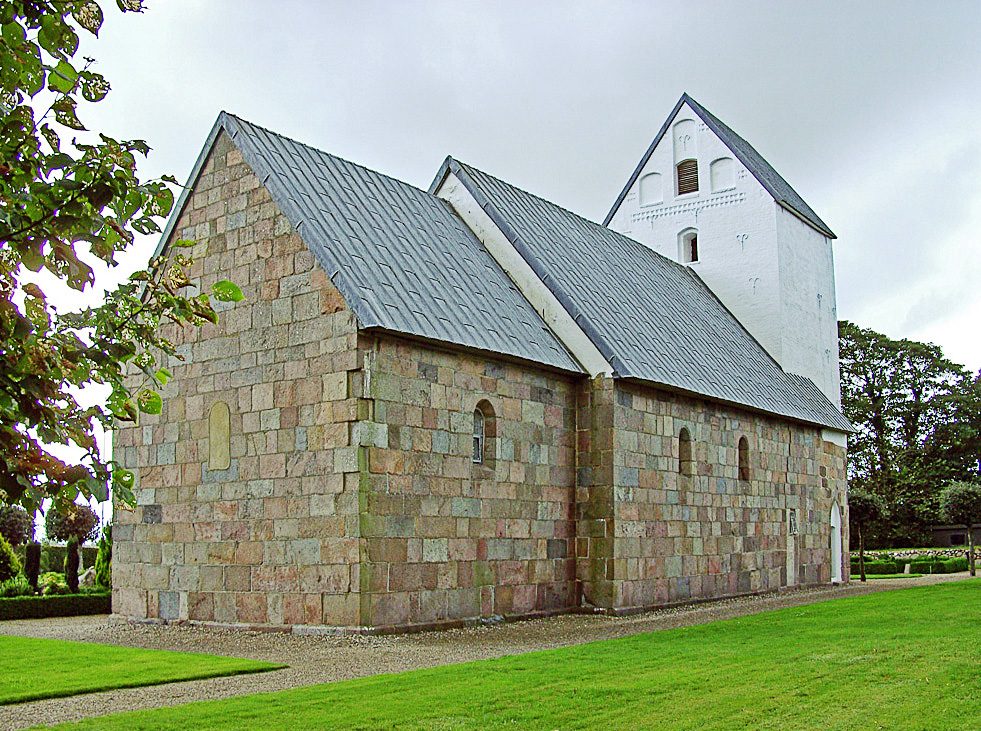
- Egvad Church
- Interactive map of Egvad Parish
- Country: Denmark
- Region: Central Denmark
- Municipality: Ringkøbing-Skjern Municipality
- Diocese: Ribe

Population (2025)
  - Total: 283
- Parish number: 8784

Egvad Parish is a parish in the Diocese of Ribe in Ringkøbing-Skjern Municipality, Denmark.
