= Bregninge Parish, Ærø Municipality =

Parish in Ærø Municipality, Denmark

Bregninge Parish Bregninge Sogn
- Parish
- The parish within Ærø Municipality
- Coordinates: 54.8942°N 10.3098°E
- Country: Denmark
- Region: Southern Denmark
- Municipality: Ærø Municipality
- Diocese: Funen

Population (2025)
  - Total: 479
- Parish number: 7717

Bregninge Parish (Danish: Bregninge Sogn) is a parish in the Diocese of Funen in Ærø Municipality, Denmark.
