= Rise Parish, Aabenraa Municipality =

Parish in Aabenraa Municipality, Denmark

Rise Parish Rise Sogn
- Parish
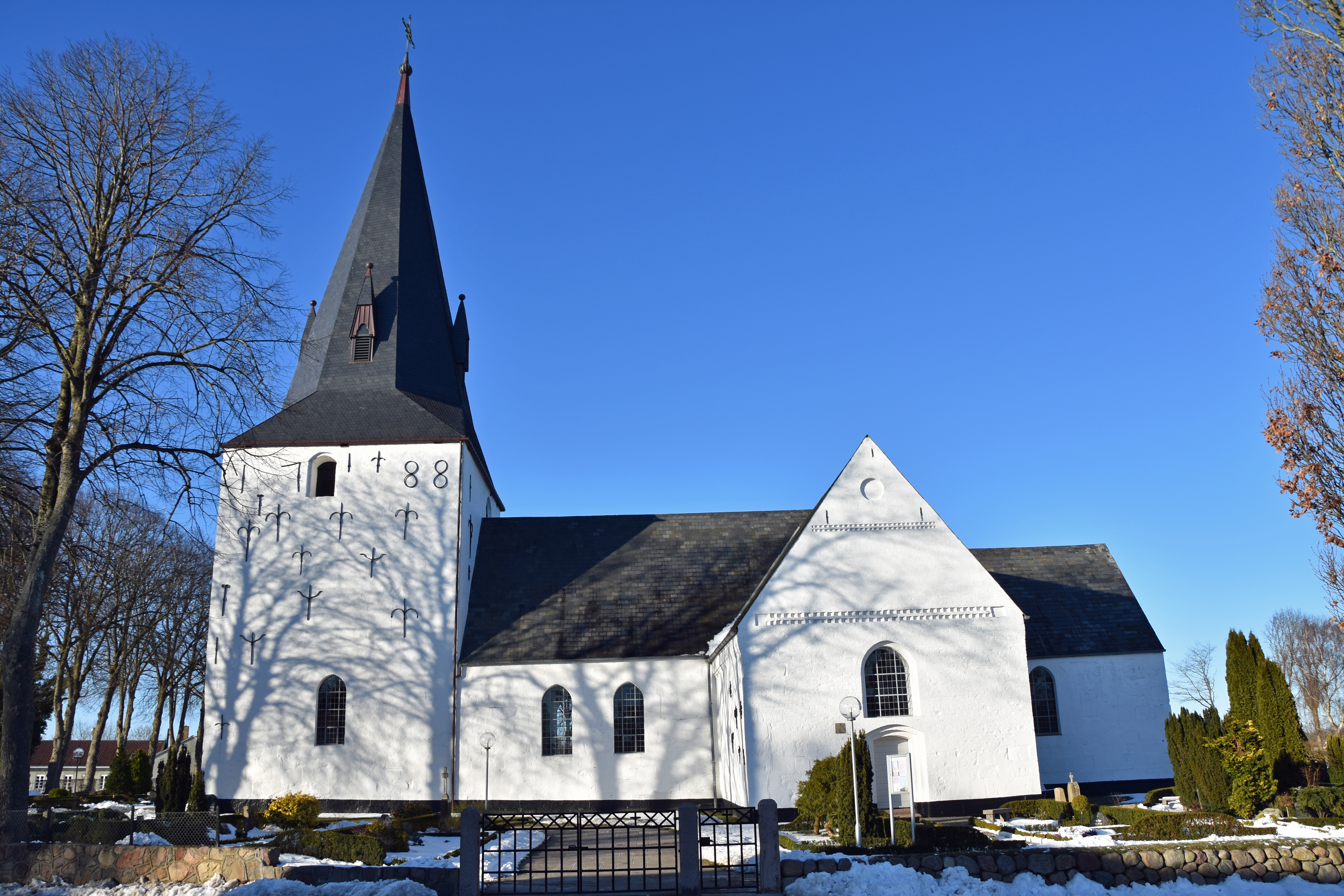
- Rise Church

- The parish within Aabenraa Municipality
- Country: Denmark
- Region: Southern Denmark
- Municipality: Aabenraa Municipality
- Diocese: Haderslev

Population (2025)
  - Total: 6,610
- Parish number: 9014

Rise Parish (Danish: Rise Sogn) is a parish in the Diocese of Haderslev in Aabenraa Municipality, Denmark.
