= List of parishes in Region Zealand =

This is a list of parishes in Region Zealand. As of 2022, there are 2,133 parishes (Danish: Sogn) within the Church of Denmark, approximately 419 of which are within the Region Zealand. They are listed below by municipality.

== Faxe ==
Map of the parishes in Faxe Municipality.

1. Øde Førslev Parish
2. Terslev Parish
3. Tureby Parish
4. Teestrup Parish
5. Haslev Parish
6. Freerslev Parish
7. Sønder Dalby Parish
8. Karise Parish
9. Bråby Parish
10. Ulse Parish
11. Øster Egede Parish
12. Alslev Parish
13. Spjellerup Parish
14. Smerup Parish
15. Vester Egede Parish
16. Kongsted Parish
17. Faxe Parish
18. Hylleholt Parish
19. Vemmetofte Parish
20. Roholte Parish

== Greve ==
Map of the parishes in Greve Municipality.

1. Tune Parish
2. Greve Parish
3. Kildebrønde Parish
4. Karlslunde Parish
5. Karlslunde Strand Parish
6. Mosede Parish

== Guldborgsund ==
Map of the parishes in Guldborgsund Municipality.

1. Vålse Parish
2. Kippinge Parish
3. Nørre Vedby Parish
4. Nørre Alslev Parish
5. Gundslev Parish
6. Vigsnæs Parish
7. Brarup Parish
8. Nørre Kirkeby Parish
9. Torkilstrup Parish
10. Lillebrænde Parish
11. Stubbekøbing Parish
12. Maglebrænde Parish
13. Åstrup Parish
14. Sakskøbing Parish
15. Tårs Parish
16. Majbølle Parish
17. Stadager Parish
18. Ønslev Parish
19. Eskilstrup Parish
20. Falkerslev Parish
21. Horbelev Parish
22. Våbensted Parish
23. Radsted Parish
24. Tingsted Parish
25. Systofte Parish
26. Nørre Ørslev Parish
27. Horreby Parish
28. Karleby Parish
29. Sønder Kirkeby Parish
30. Sønder Alslev Parish
31. Engestofte Parish
32. Slemminge Parish
33. Fjelde Parish
34. Toreby Parish
35. Nykøbing F Parish
36. Idestrup Parish
37. Godsted Parish
38. Musse Parish
39. Døllefjelde Parish
40. Bregninge Parish
41. Kettinge Parish
42. Væggerløse Parish
43. Vester Ulslev Parish
44. Øster Ulslev Parish
45. Herritslev Parish
46. Vantore Parish
47. Nysted Parish
48. Skelby Parish
49. Gedesby Parish
50. Gedser Parish

== Holbæk ==
Map of the parishes in Holbæk Municipality.

1. Hjembæk-Svinninge Parish
2. Kundby Parish
3. Gislinge Parish
4. Hagested Parish
5. Hørby Parish
6. Udby Parish
7. Orø Parish
8. Butterup-Tuse Parish
9. Søstrup Parish
10. Tveje Merløse Parish
11. Sankt Nicolai Parish
12. Vipperød Parish
13. Jyderup Parish
14. Stigs Bjergby Parish
15. Mørkøv Parish
16. Nørre Jernløse Parish
17. Holmstrup Parish
18. Skamstrup-Frydendal Parish
19. Sønder Jernløse Parish
20. Kvanløse Parish
21. Søndersted Parish
22. Undløse Parish
23. Ugerløse Parish
24. Tølløse Parish
25. Soderup Parish
26. Store Tåstrup Parish
27. Kirke Eskilstrup Parish

== Kalundborg ==
Map of the parishes in Kalundborg Municipality.

1. Sejerø Parish
2. Røsnæs Parish
3. Raklev Parish
4. Bregninge Parish
5. Føllenslev Parish
6. Særslev Parish
7. Vor Frue Parish
8. Nyvang Parish
9. Tømmerup Parish
10. Værslev Parish
11. Viskinge Parish
12. Bjergsted Parish
13. Årby Parish
14. Rørby Parish
15. Ubby Parish
16. Aunsø Parish
17. Svallerup Parish
18. Lille Fuglede Parish
19. Jorløse Parish
20. Buerup Parish
21. Store Fuglede Parish
22. Gørlev Parish
23. Bakkendrup Parish
24. Hallenslev Parish
25. Sæby Parish
26. Reerslev Parish
27. Kirke Helsinge Parish
28. Finderup Parish
29. Drøsselbjerg Parish
30. Gierslev Parish
31. Solbjerg Parish
32. Ørslev Parish
33. Alleshave Parish
34. Reersø Parish

== Køge ==
Map of the parishes in Køge Municipality.

1. Borup Parish
2. Ejby Parish
3. Højelse Parish
4. Ølsemagle Parish
5. Kimmerslev Parish
6. Nørre Dalby Parish
7. Gørslev Parish
8. Bjæverskov Parish
9. Lellinge Parish
10. Boholte Parish
11. Køge Parish
12. Vollerslev Parish
13. Lidemark Parish
14. Sædder Parish
15. Herfølge Parish

== Lejre ==
Map of the parishes in Lejre Municipality.

1. Kirke Hyllinge Parish
2. Sæby Parish
3. Gershøj Parish
4. Rye Parish
5. Lyndby Parish
6. Herslev Parish
7. Kirke Sonnerup Parish
8. Kirke Såby Parish
9. Gevninge Parish
10. Kornerup Parish
11. Kirke Hvalsø Parish
12. Kisserup Parish
13. Allerslev Parish
14. Rorup Parish
15. Glim Parish
16. Særløse Parish
17. Osted Parish

== Lolland ==
Map of the parishes in Lolland Municipality.

1. Købelev Parish
2. Vindeby Parish
3. Utterslev Parish
4. Horslunde Parish
5. Fejø Parish
6. Femø Parish
7. Sandby Parish
8. Herredskirke Parish
9. Løjtofte Parish
10. Vesterborg Parish
11. Birket Parish
12. Askø Parish
13. Branderslev Parish
14. Stormarks Parish
15. Nordlunde Parish
16. Halsted Parish
17. Stokkemarke Parish
18. Bandholm Parish
19. Sankt Nikolai Parish
20. Avnede Parish
21. Gurreby Parish
22. Skovlænge Parish
23. Søllested Parish
24. Østofte Parish
25. Hunseby Parish
26. Kappel Parish
27. Vestenskov Parish
28. Arninge Parish
29. Græshave Parish
30. Landet Parish
31. Ryde Parish
32. Vejleby Parish
33. Skørringe Parish
34. Hillested Parish
35. Maribo Parish
36. Bursø Parish
37. Krønge Parish
38. Tillitse Parish
39. Dannemare Parish
40. Gloslunde Parish
41. Tirsted Parish
42. Nebbelunde Parish
43. Sædinge Parish
44. Holeby Parish
45. Fuglse Parish
46. Rødby Parish
47. Ringsebølle Parish
48. Tågerup Parish
49. Torslunde Parish
50. Rødbyhavn Parish
51. Olstrup Parish
52. Errindlev Parish
53. Langø Parish
54. Nøbbet Parish

== Næstved ==
Map of the parishes in Næstved Municipality.

1. Vrangstrup Parish
2. Næsby Parish
3. Tyvelse Parish
4. Sandby Parish
5. Haldagerlille Parish
6. Tystrup Parish
7. Bavelse Parish
8. Glumsø Parish
9. Tybjerg Parish
10. Aversi Parish
11. Ting Jellinge Parish
12. Krummerup Parish
13. Fuglebjerg Parish
14. Førslev Parish
15. Gunderslev Parish
16. Skelby Parish
17. Herlufmagle Parish
18. Hårslev Parish
19. Kvislemark Parish
20. Hyllinge Parish
21. Vallensved Parish
22. Rislev Parish
23. Fensmark Parish
24. Fyrendal Parish
25. Marvede Parish
26. Karrebæk Parish
27. Fodby Parish
28. Herlufsholm Parish
29. Holsted Parish
30. Holme-Olstrup Parish
31. Toksværd Parish
32. Sankt Peders Parish
33. Sankt Mortens Parish
34. Sankt Jørgens Parish
35. Rønnebæk Parish
36. Næstelsø Parish
37. Everdrup Parish
38. Vejlø Parish
39. Vester Egesborg Parish
40. Mogenstrup Parish
41. Snesere Parish
42. Hammer Parish

== Odsherred ==
Map of the parishes in Odsherred Municipality.

1. Odden Parish
2. Højby Parish
3. Nykøbing Sj Parish
4. Rørvig Parish
5. Nørre Asmindrup Parish
6. Vig Parish
7. Egebjerg Parish
8. Fårevejle Parish
9. Asnæs Parish
10. Grevinge Parish
11. Vallekilde Parish
12. Hørve Parish
13. Lumsås Parish

== Ringsted ==
Map of the parishes in Ringsted Municipality.

1. Gyrstinge Parish
2. Allindemagle Parish
3. Haraldsted Parish
4. Valsølille Parish
5. Jystrup Parish
6. Vigersted Parish
7. Bringstrup Parish
8. Ringsted Parish
9. Benløse Parish
10. Kværkeby Parish
11. Sigersted Parish
12. Høm Parish
13. Nordrupøster Parish
14. Vetterslev Parish
15. Sneslev Parish
16. Farendløse Parish
17. Ørslev Parish

== Roskilde ==
Map of the parishes in Roskilde Municipality.

1. Jyllinge Parish
2. Gundsømagle Parish
3. Kirkerup Parish
4. Hvedstrup Parish
5. Ågerup Parish
6. Himmelev Parish
7. Sankt Jørgensbjerg Parish
8. Roskilde Domsogn Parish
9. Svogerslev Parish
10. Roskilde Søndre Parish
11. Vindinge Parish
12. Vor Frue Parish
13. Dåstrup Parish
14. Syv Parish
15. Gadstrup Parish
16. Snoldelev Parish
17. Ørsted Parish

== Slagelse ==
Map of the parishes in Slagelse Municipality.

1. Nordrupvester Parish
2. Kirke Stillinge Parish
3. Havrebjerg Parish
4. Sønderup Parish
5. Sorterup Parish
6. Hejninge Parish
7. Sankt Peders Parish
8. Nørrevang Parish
9. Gudum Parish
10. Ottestrup Parish
11. Kindertofte Parish
12. Sankt Mikkels Parish
13. Antvorskov Parish
14. Halskov Parish
15. Tårnborg Parish
16. Vemmelev Parish
17. Slots Bjergby Parish
18. Gerlev Parish
19. Sludstrup Parish
20. Sørbymagle Parish
21. Kirkerup Parish
22. Hemmeshøj Parish
23. Lundforlund Parish
24. Fårdrup Parish
25. Skørpinge Parish
26. Gimlinge Parish
27. Sankt Povls Parish
28. Boeslunde Parish
29. Eggeslevmagle Parish
30. Flakkebjerg Parish
31. Høve Parish
32. Hyllested Parish
33. Skælskør Parish
34. Sønder Bjerge Parish
35. Venslev Parish
36. Agersø Parish
37. Magleby Parish
38. Tjæreby Parish
39. Ørslev Parish
40. Holsteinborg Parish
41. Omø Parish Parish

== Solrød ==
Map of the parishes in Solrød Municipality.

1. Havdrup Parish
2. Solrød Parish
3. Karlstrup Parish
4. Kirke Skensved Parish
5. Jersie Parish

== Sorø ==
Map of the parishes in Sorø Municipality.

1. Niløse Parish
2. Stenlille Parish
3. Stenmagle Parish
4. Ruds Vedby Parish
5. Skellebjerg Parish
6. Tersløse Parish
7. Munke Bjergby Parish
8. Kirke Flinterup Parish
9. Bromme Parish
10. Pedersborg Parish
11. Bjernede Parish
12. Sorø Parish
13. Slaglille Parish
14. Fjenneslev Parish
15. Lynge Parish
16. Vester Broby Parish
17. Alsted Parish

== Stevns ==
Map of the parishes in Stevns Municipality.

1. Valløby Parish
2. Strøby Parish
3. Vråby Parish
4. Endeslev Parish
5. Himlingøje Parish
6. Tårnby Parish
7. Hårlev Parish
8. Varpelev Parish
9. Magleby Stevns Parish
10. Holtug Parish
11. Hellested Parish
12. Store Heddinge Parish
13. Frøslev Parish
14. Lyderslev Parish
15. Havnelev Parish
16. Lille Heddinge Parish
17. Højerup Parish

== Vordingborg ==
Map of the parishes in Vordingborg Municipality.

1. Køng Parish
2. Lundby Parish
3. Bårse Parish
4. Præstø Parish
5. Sværdborg Parish
6. Udby Parish
7. Beldringe Parish
8. Skibinge Parish
9. Jungshoved Parish
10. Allerslev Parish
11. Vordingborg Parish
12. Kastrup Parish
13. Ørslev Parish
14. Øster Egesborg Parish
15. Mern Parish
16. Stensby Parish
17. Kalvehave Parish
18. Nyord Parish
19. Stege Parish
20. Keldby Parish
21. Elmelunde Parish
22. Borre Parish
23. Magleby Parish
24. Bogø Parish
25. Fanefjord Parish
26. Damsholte Parish
27. Svinø Parish
