= Humble Parish =

Parish in Langeland Municipality, Denmark

Humble Parish Humble Sogn
- Parish
- The parish within Langeland Municipality
- Coordinates: 54.8343°N 10.7056°E
- Country: Denmark
- Region: Southern Denmark
- Municipality: Langeland Municipality
- Diocese: Funen

Population (2025)
  - Total: 1,191
- Parish number: 7709

Humble Parish (Danish: Humble Sogn) is a parish in the Diocese of Funen in Langeland Municipality, Denmark. Until 2007, the parish was in the Sydlangeland Municipality (Funen County), and until 1970 was in Svendborg County. The parish contains the towns of Humble and Ristinge. The parish has an enclave around Skovsgård, between Lindelse Parish and Fodslette Parish.
