= Aabenraa Parish =

Parish in Aabenraa Municipality, Denmark

Aabenraa Parish Aabenraa Sogn
- Parish
- The parish within Aabenraa Municipality
- Coordinates: 55°2'39.8"N, 9°25'5.1"E
- Country: Denmark
- Region: Southern Denmark
- Municipality: Aabenraa Municipality
- Diocese: Haderslev

Population (2025)
  - Total: 16,664
- Parish number: 9010

Aabenraa Parish (Danish: Aabenraa Sogn) is a parish in the Diocese of Haderslev in Aabenraa Municipality, Denmark.
