= Øster Løgum Parish =

Parish in Aabenraa Municipality, Denmark

Øster Løgum Parish Øster Løgum Sogn
- Parish
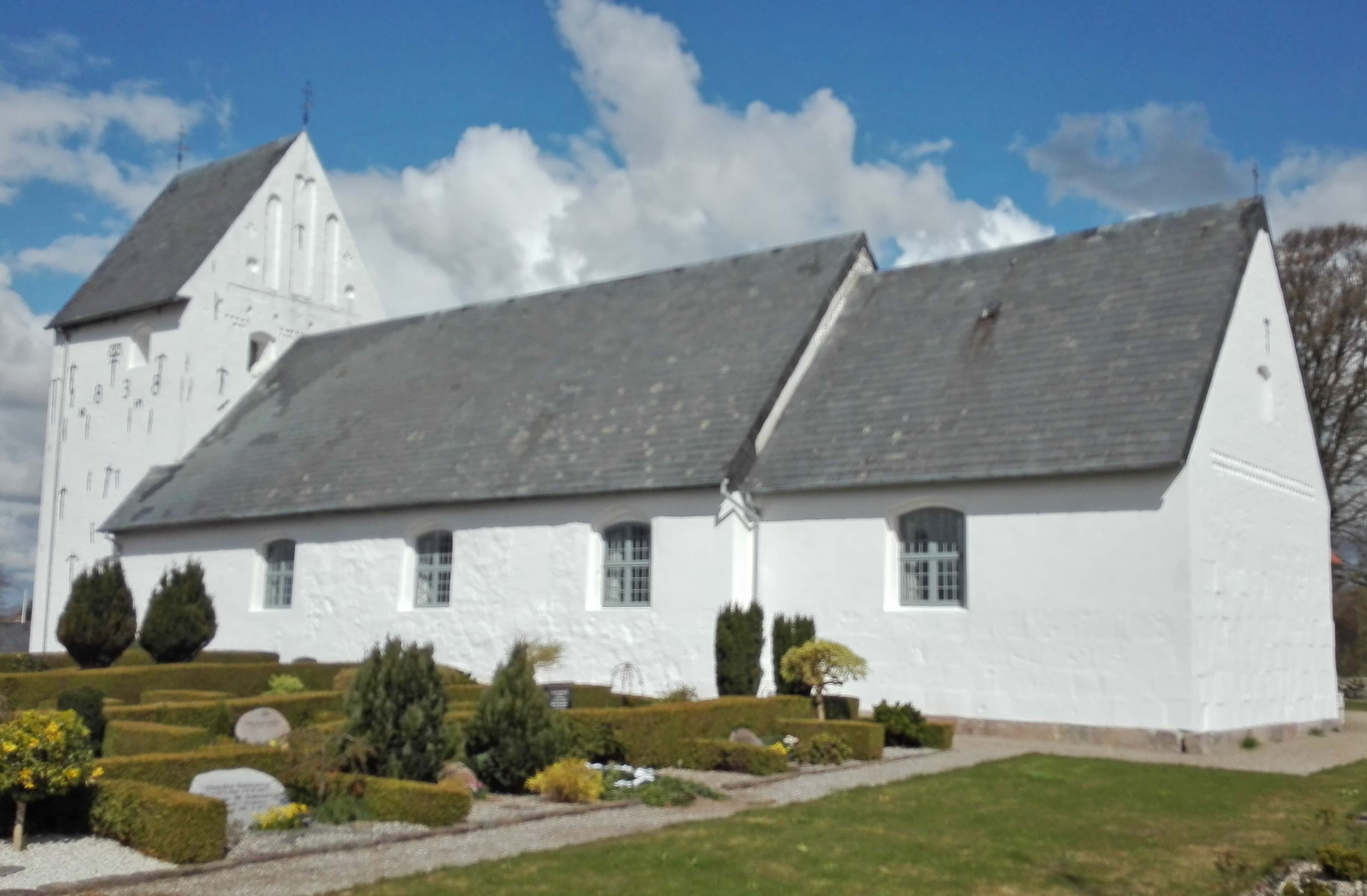
- Øster Løgum Church

- The parish within Aabenraa Municipality
- Country: Denmark
- Region: Southern Denmark
- Municipality: Aabenraa Municipality
- Diocese: Haderslev

Population (2025)
  - Total: 918
- Parish number: 9015

Øster Løgum Parish (Danish: Øster Løgum Sogn) is a parish in the Diocese of Haderslev in Aabenraa Municipality, Denmark.
