= Rise Parish, Ærø Municipality =

Parish in Ærø Municipality, Denmark

Rise Parish Rise Sogn
- Parish
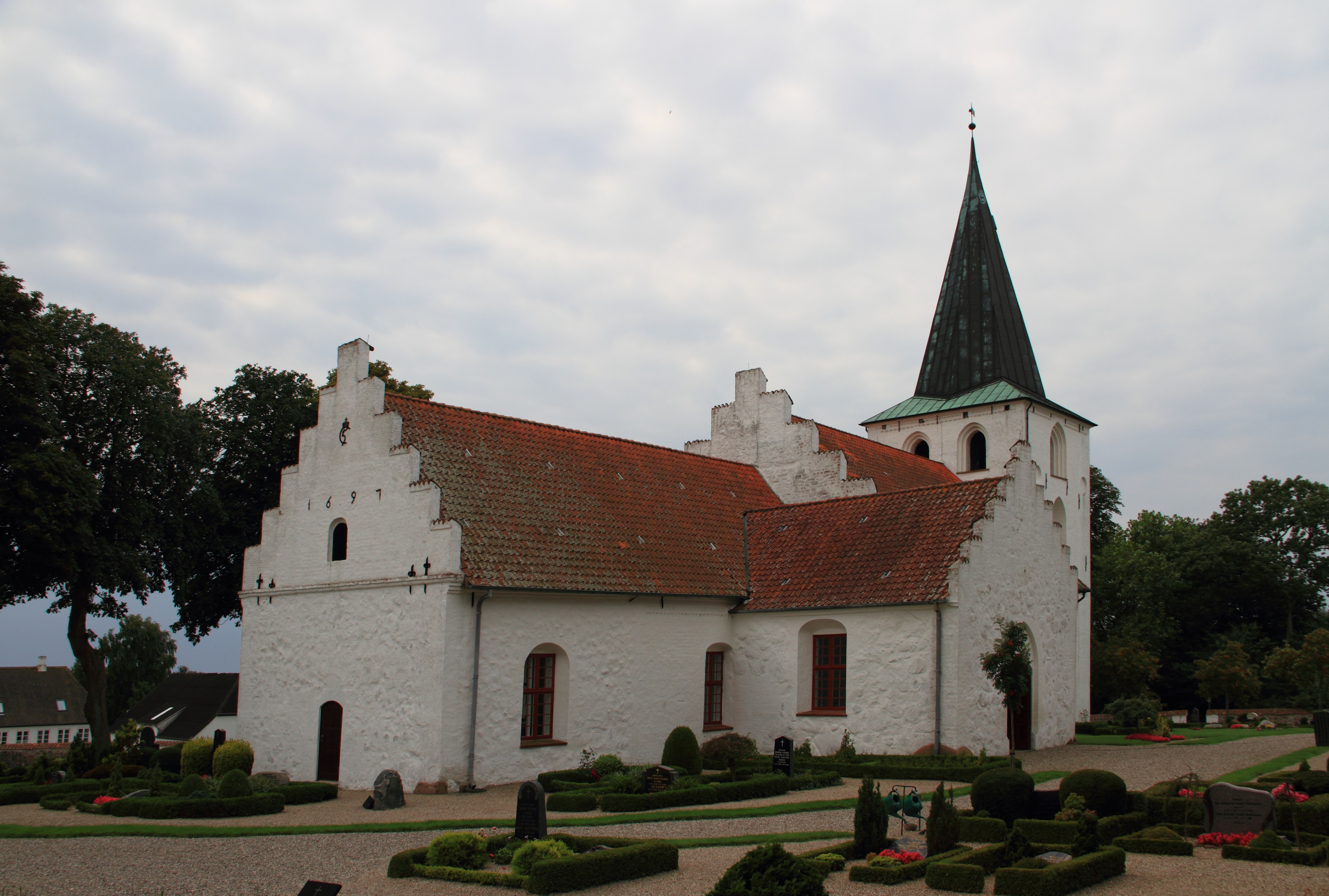
- Rise Church

- The parish within Ærø Municipality
- Coordinates: 54.8531°N 10.4028°E
- Country: Denmark
- Region: Southern Denmark
- Municipality: Ærø Municipality
- Diocese: Funen

Population (2025)
  - Total: 792
- Parish number: 7715

Rise Parish (Danish: Rise Sogn) is a parish in the Diocese of Funen in Ærø Municipality, Denmark.
