= Langenæs Church =

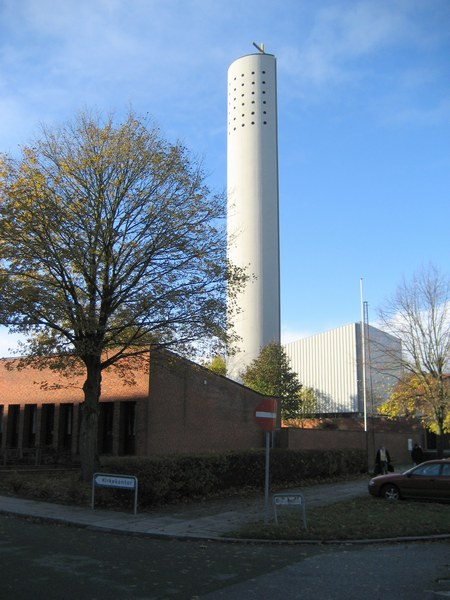
- Langenæs Church
- Langenæs Church
- 56.1408°N 10.1783°E
- Location: Langenæs Alle 61; 8000 Aarhus C
- Country: Denmark
- Denomination: Church of Denmark

History
- Status: Church

Architecture
- Architect(s): Johan Richter; Arne Gravers
- Completed: 1958

Specifications
- Materials: Brick

Administration
- Archdiocese: Diocese of Aarhus

Langenæs Church (Danish: Langenæskirken) is a church in Aarhus, Denmark. The church is situated in the southern Langenæs neighbourhood on Langenæs Alle. Langenæs Church is a parish church, and the only church in Langenæs Parish, under the Diocese of Aarhus and within the Church of Denmark, the Danish state church. The church serves some 6.000 parishioners in Langenæs Parish and holds weekly sermons along with weddings, burials and baptisms.

Langenæs Church is a Green Church (Grøn Kirke), a network of Danish churches dedicated to implement and further an environmentally friendly operation and climate actions in relation to the current climate crisis. The network agenda was launched by the National Council of Churches in Denmark (NCCD) in 2011.

== History ==
Langenæs Church was built in response to sustained population growth in St. Lukas Parish prior to the Second World War. As the Langenæs neighbourhood was under development, the population was projected to exceed 30.000 people, so a splitting of the parish was planned, just as St. Lukas Parish had previously been split from St. Pauls Parish. This plan was halted by the Second World War and subsequent occupation of Denmark. From 1946, until construction began, fundraising campaigns were held every year on the last day of January in the adjacent Frederiksbjerg neighbourhood until sufficient funds had finally been collected. An architectural contest were held in 1957 which was won by Arne Gravers and Johan Richter who later designed the listed Århus Statsgymnasium and Aarhus Concert Hall. Building permits were obtained in 1962, construction began in 1964, and in 1966, the church stood completed.

The church is built in red brick and concrete. It underwent repair and restoration in 2013, led by Cubo Architects. In the process, visual artist Elle-Mie Ejdrup Hansen installed new glasswork in the nave, for which she was awarded Farveprisen (The Colour Prize).

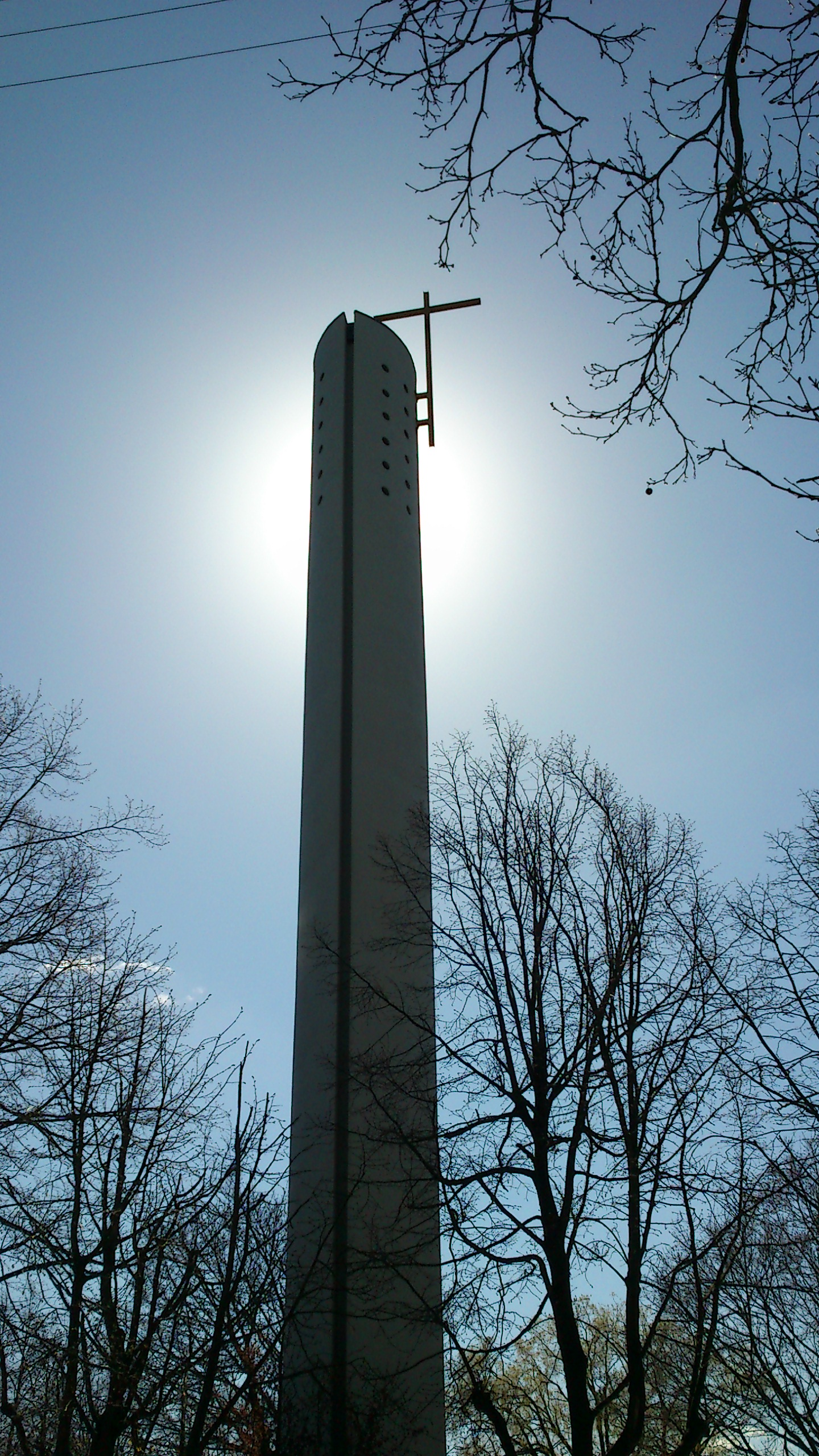
Tower

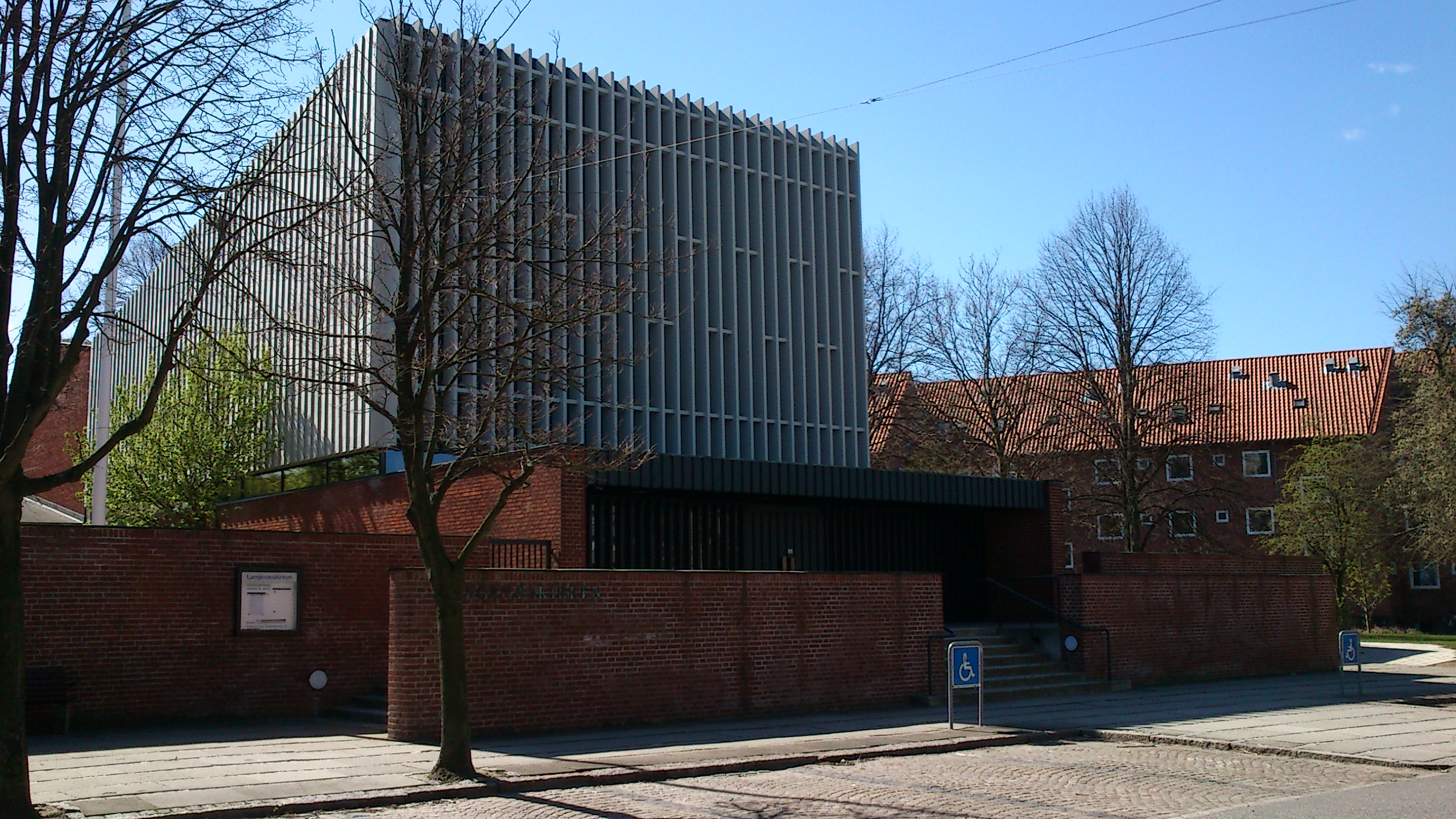
Seen from south

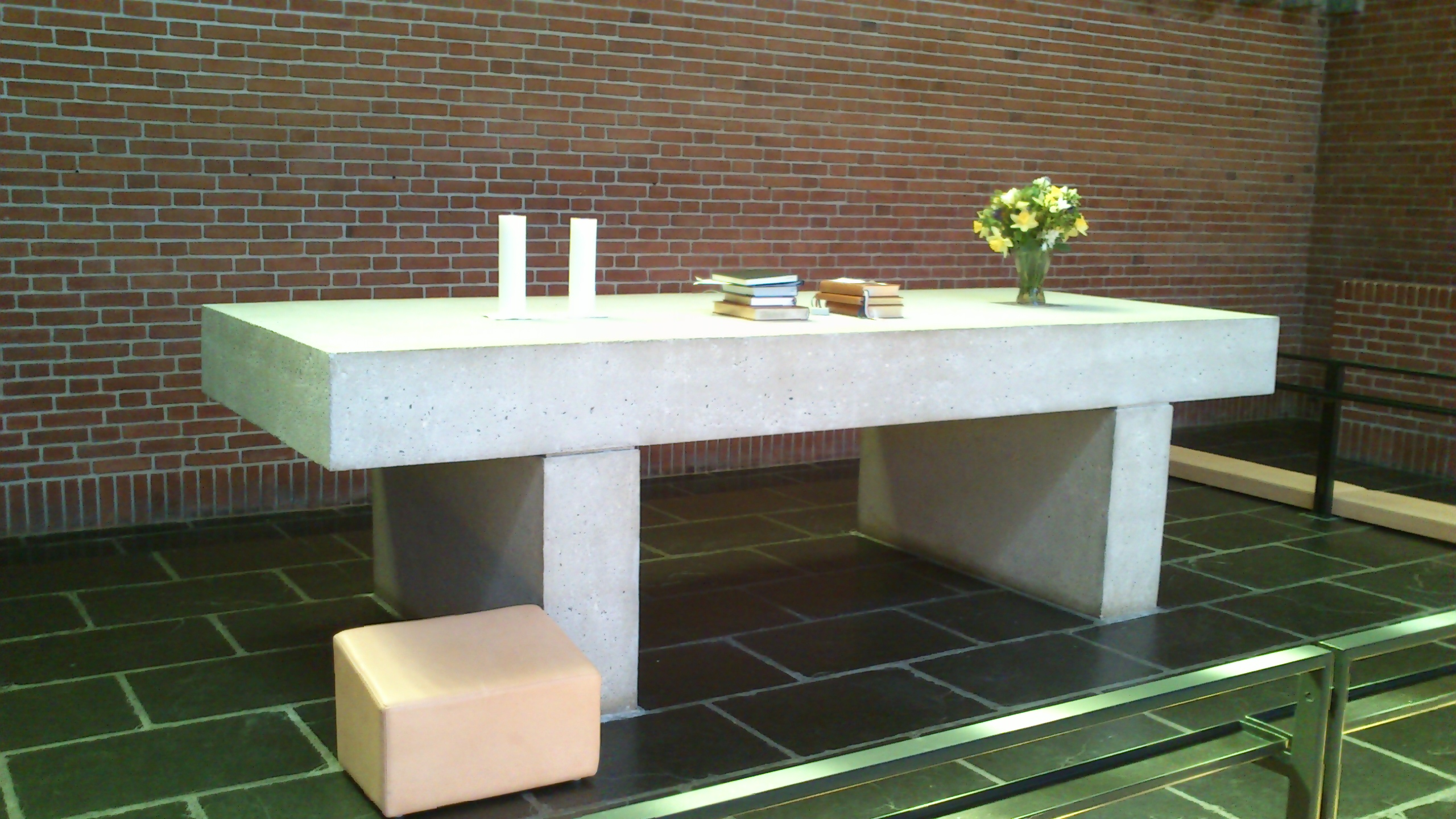
Altar

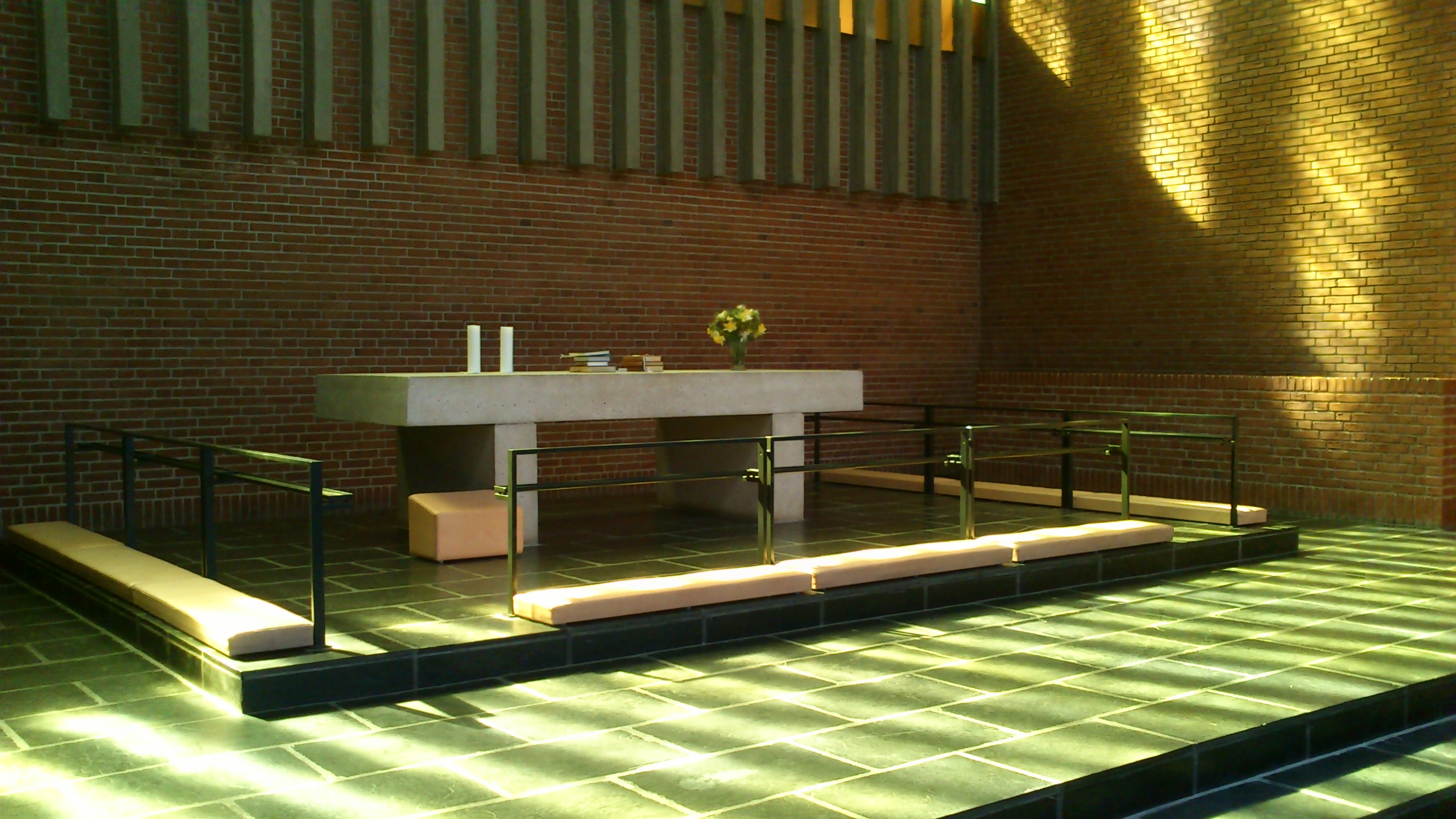
Altar

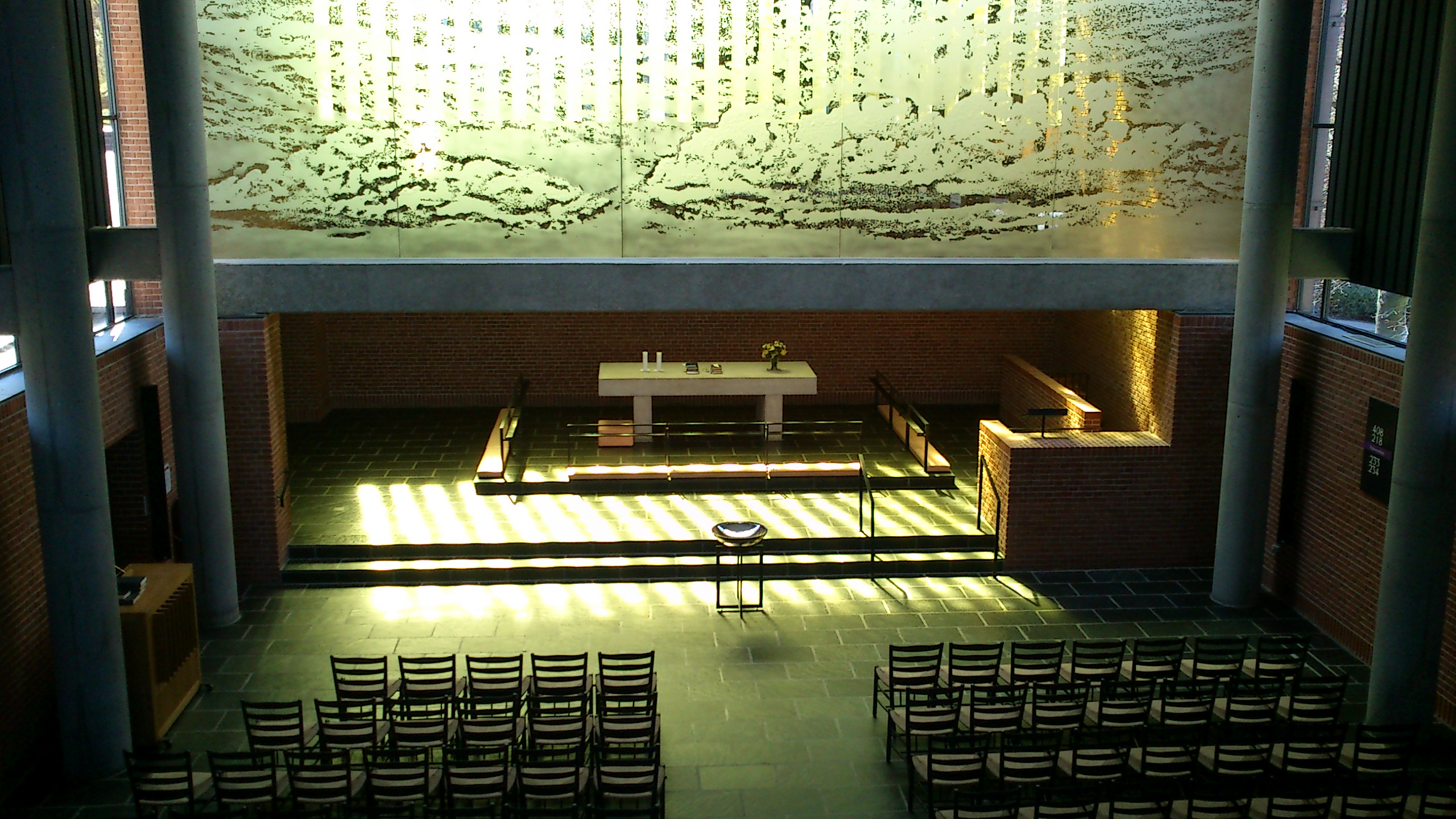
Nave

== See also ==
- List of churches in Aarhus

== Sources ==
- Anne Ehlers, Elle-Mie Ejdrup Hansen, ed. (2015). Himlen ind – Lyset ned – Blikket ud [Heaven in - Light down - Look out] (in Danish). Forlaget Wunderbuch.
