= Langenæs =

- Neighborhood
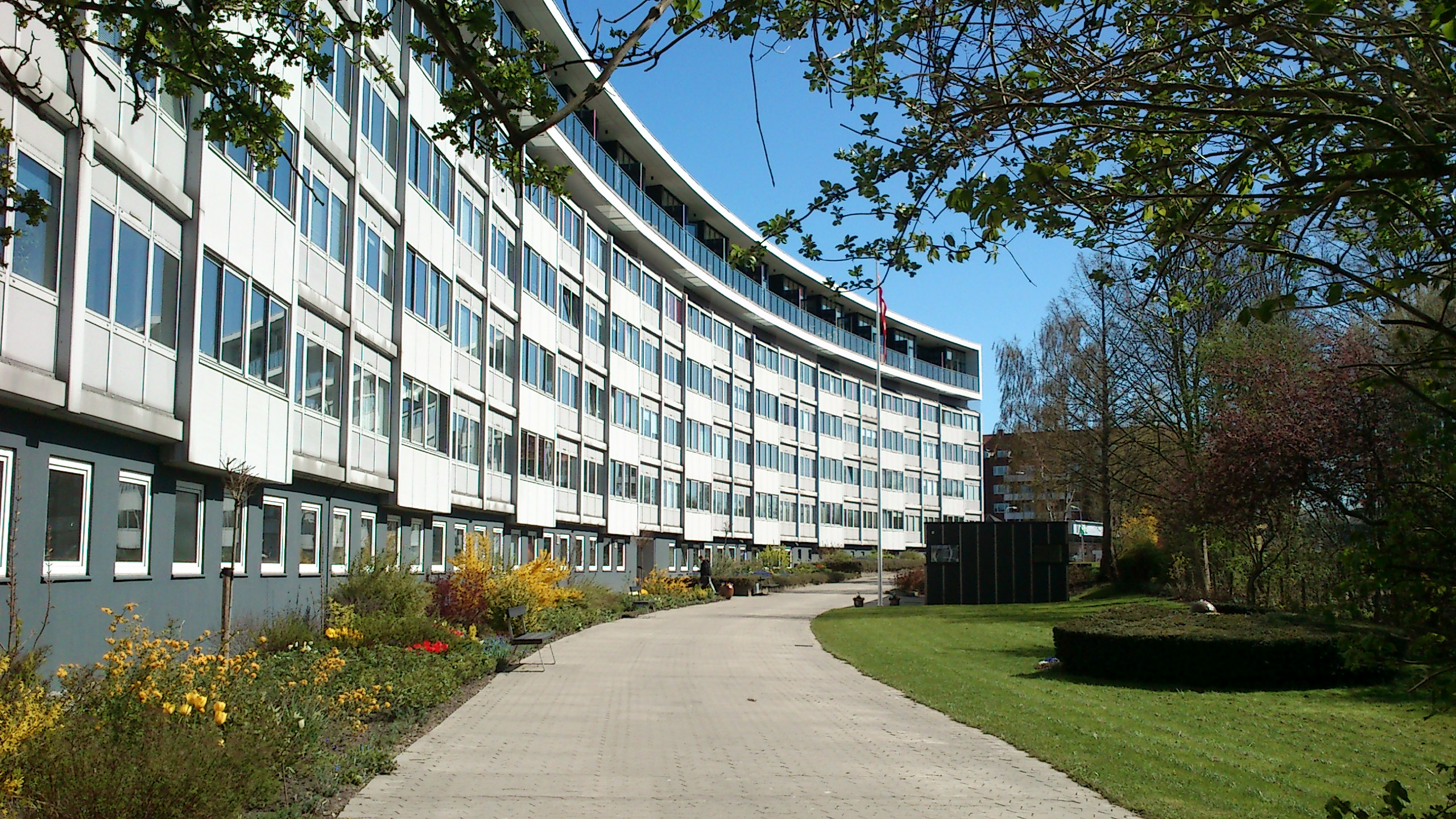
- Langenæs apartment complex

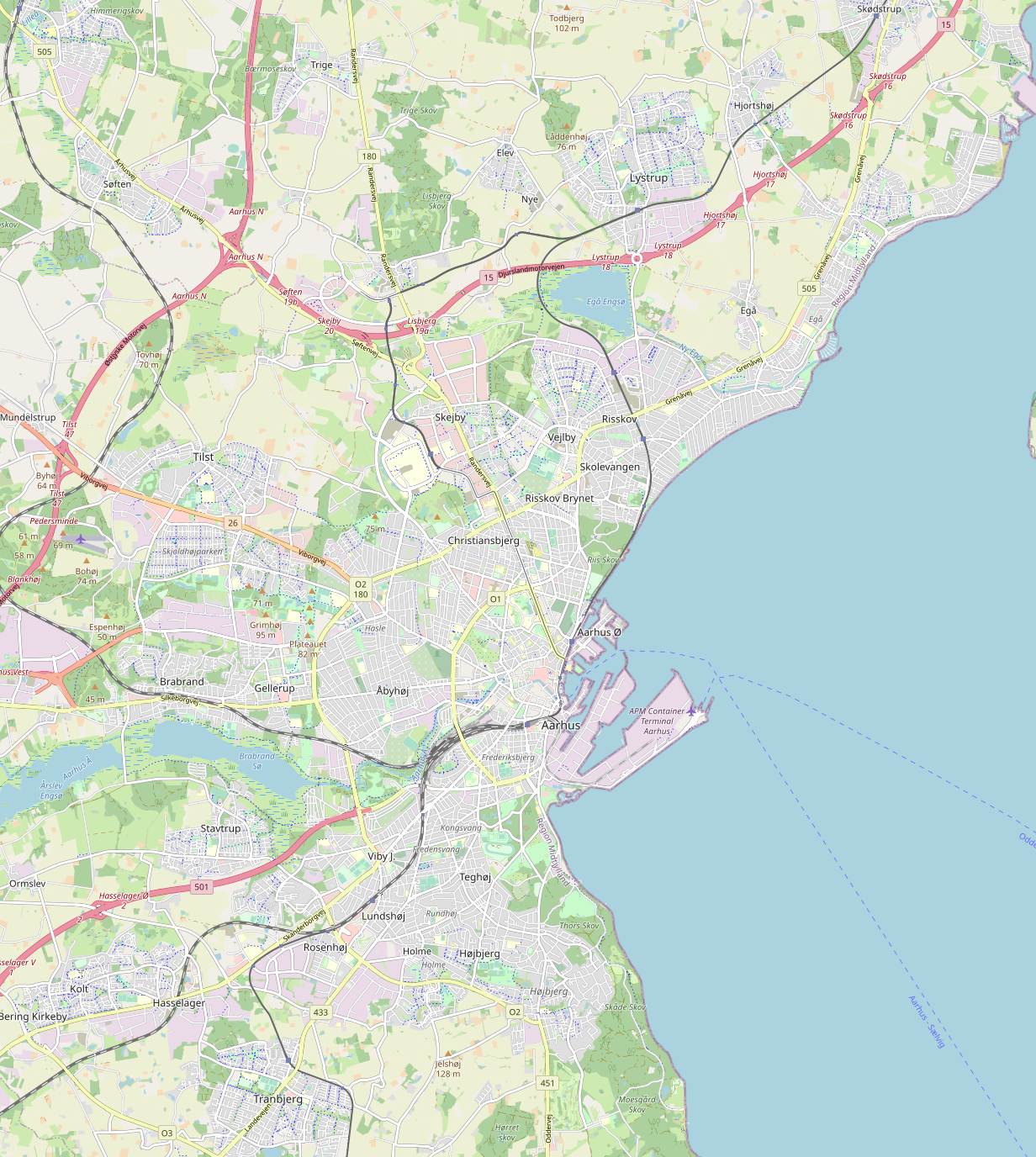
- Location within Aarhus
- Coordinates: 56.142855°N 10.182193°E
- Country: Denmark
- Region: Central Denmark
- Municipality: Aarhus Municipality
- Parish: Langenæs
- Postal code: 8000

Langenæs is a small neighborhood in the city of Aarhus, Denmark with about 6,500 residents, as of 2014. The neighborhood is part of the district Midtbyen (the town center) and borders the neighborhoods of Frederiksbjerg and Marselisborg to the East and the district of Viby to the South. Langenæs is delimited by the streets Søndre Ringgade, Skanderborgvej, Marselis Boulevard and the valley of Brabrand Ådal.

The neighborhood is predominantly 2-5 bedroom apartments in blocks of 5 to 7 floors. The area is characterized by the apartment towers Langenæshus, Langenæsbo and Højhus Langenæs, a 55 meters tall reddish aluminium clad tower which is the tallest brick structure in the country.

== History ==
Langenæs was built in the 1950s as a planned neighborhood of apartment complexes with the intention of testing new architectural ideals and methodologies. The neighborhood is characteristic for its time when the ideal was open city blocks with adjacent green spaces. The oldest parts of Langenæs lies along the edges as traditional and mixed early to mid 20th century developments.

Archaeological excavations have shown the area was settled as far back as the Stone Age and Bronze Age. Langenæs was later part of the Havreballegaard and Marselisborg estate in Viby parish for 700 years, before it was bought and annexed by Aarhus City Council in 1899. In 1966 Langenæs got its own church, Langenæskirken, and today belongs to Langenæs Parish, sectioned off from Skt. Lukas Parish.

== Gallery ==
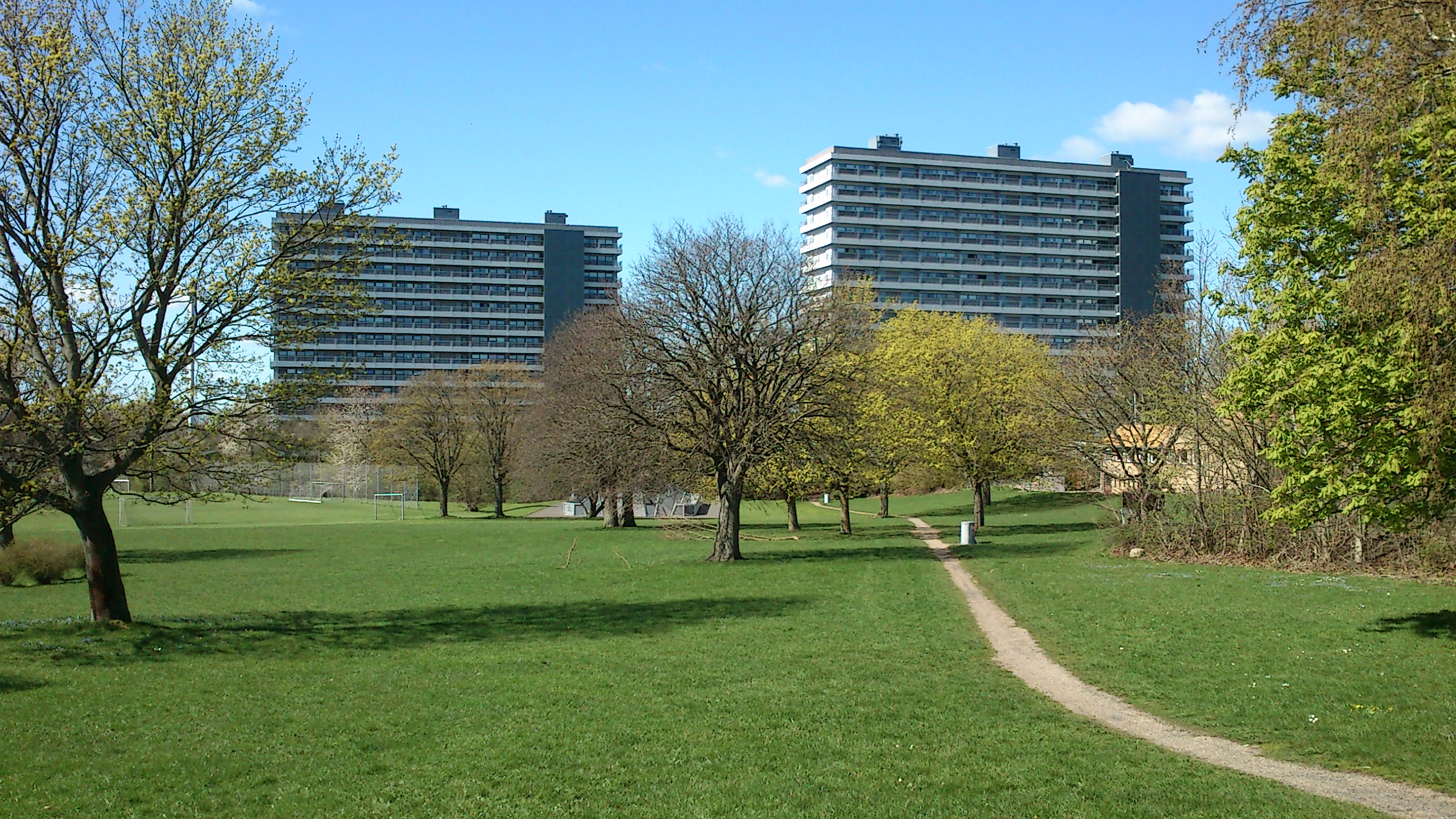
Langenæsparken. Modernist high-rises situated in a large public park.

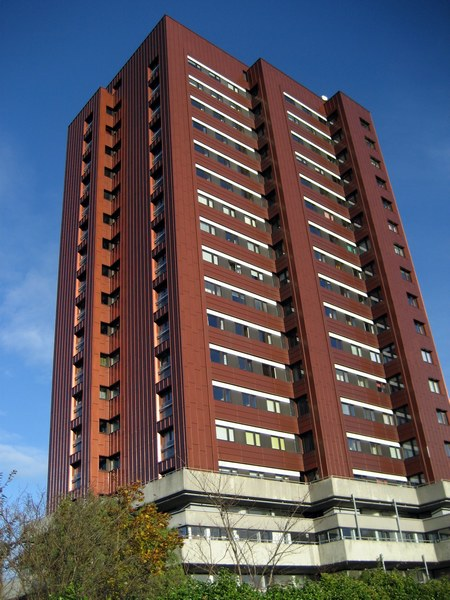
The red Højhus Langenæs.

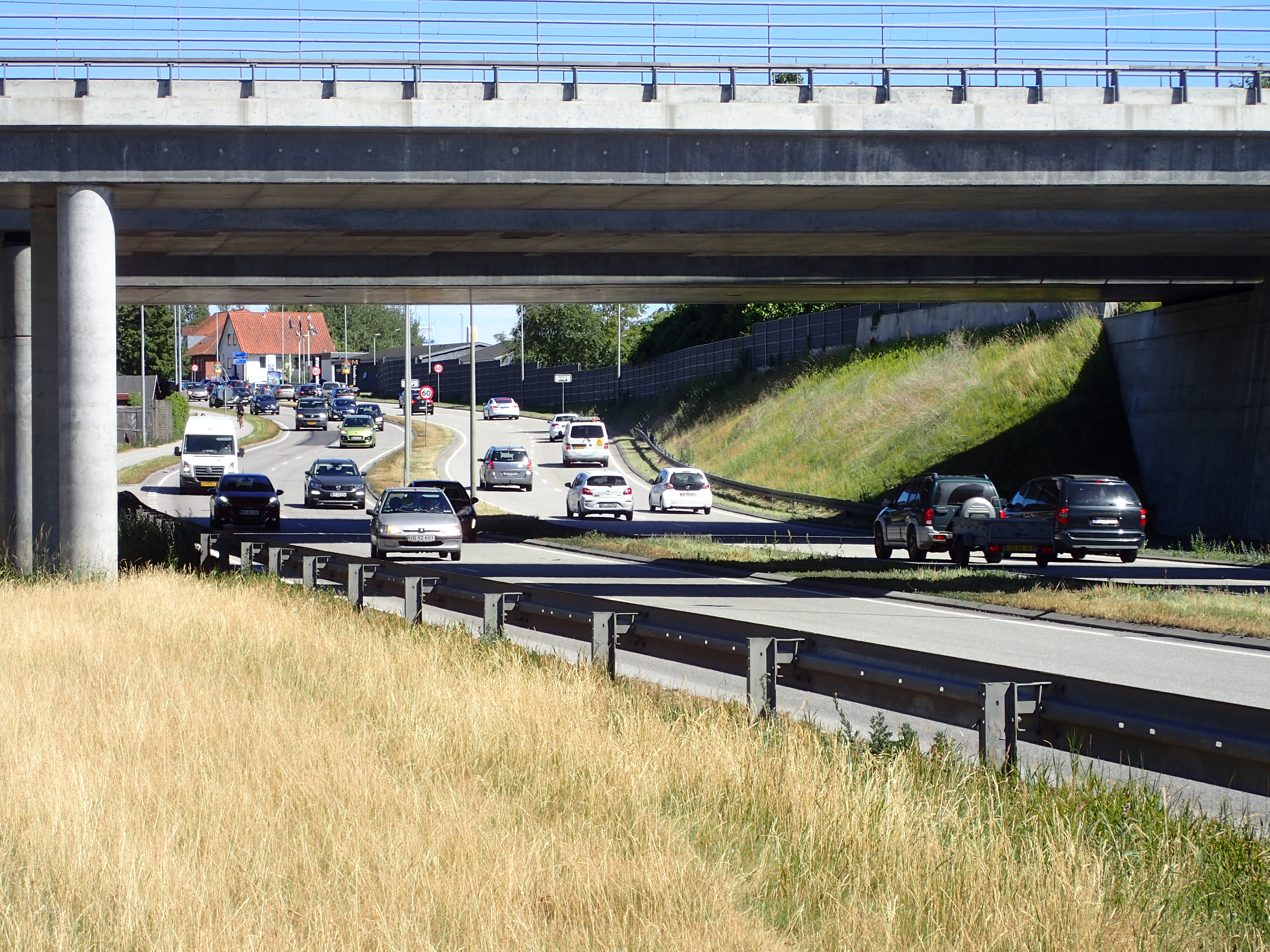
Marselis Boulevard and the Langenæs Bridges.

== Sources ==
- Lars Bech; Mikkel Andreas Beck; Marie Frank (2001). Langenæs, Aarhus, Danmark i hjertet. Forlaget Ajour.
- Aarhus Kommunes Beretning. Aarhus Municipality. 1952. pp. 133–35.
