= Tylstrup =

- Town
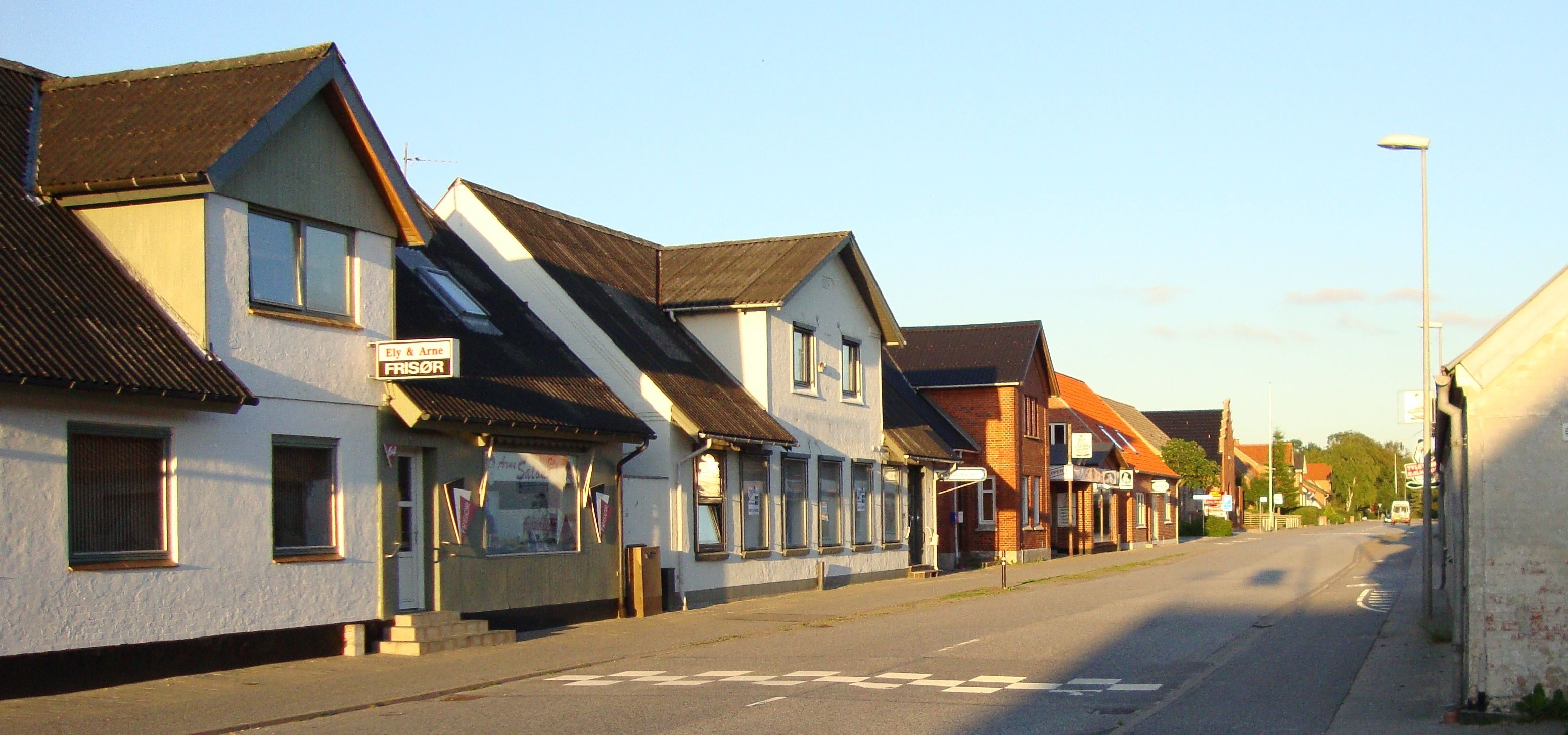
- Tylstup, the village centre

- Location in Denmark Tylstrup (North Jutland Region)
- Coordinates: 57°11′40″N 9°57′5″E
- Country: Denmark
- Region: North Jutland Region
- Municipality: Aalborg Municipality
- Parish: Ajstrup

Area
  - Urban: 1 km^{2} (0.39 sq mi)

Population (2026)
  - Urban: 1,230
  - Urban density: 1,200/km^{2} (3,200/sq mi)
- Time zone: UTC+1 (CET)
  - Summer (DST): UTC+2 (CEST)
- Postal code: DK-9382 Tylstrup

Tylstrup is a railway town at the Vendsyssel railway line. It is located some 18 km (11 mi) north of Aalborg's city centre and belongs to the Municipality of Aalborg in the North Jutland Region in Denmark Tylstrup has a population of 1,230 (1 January 2026).
