= Parish (Denmark) =

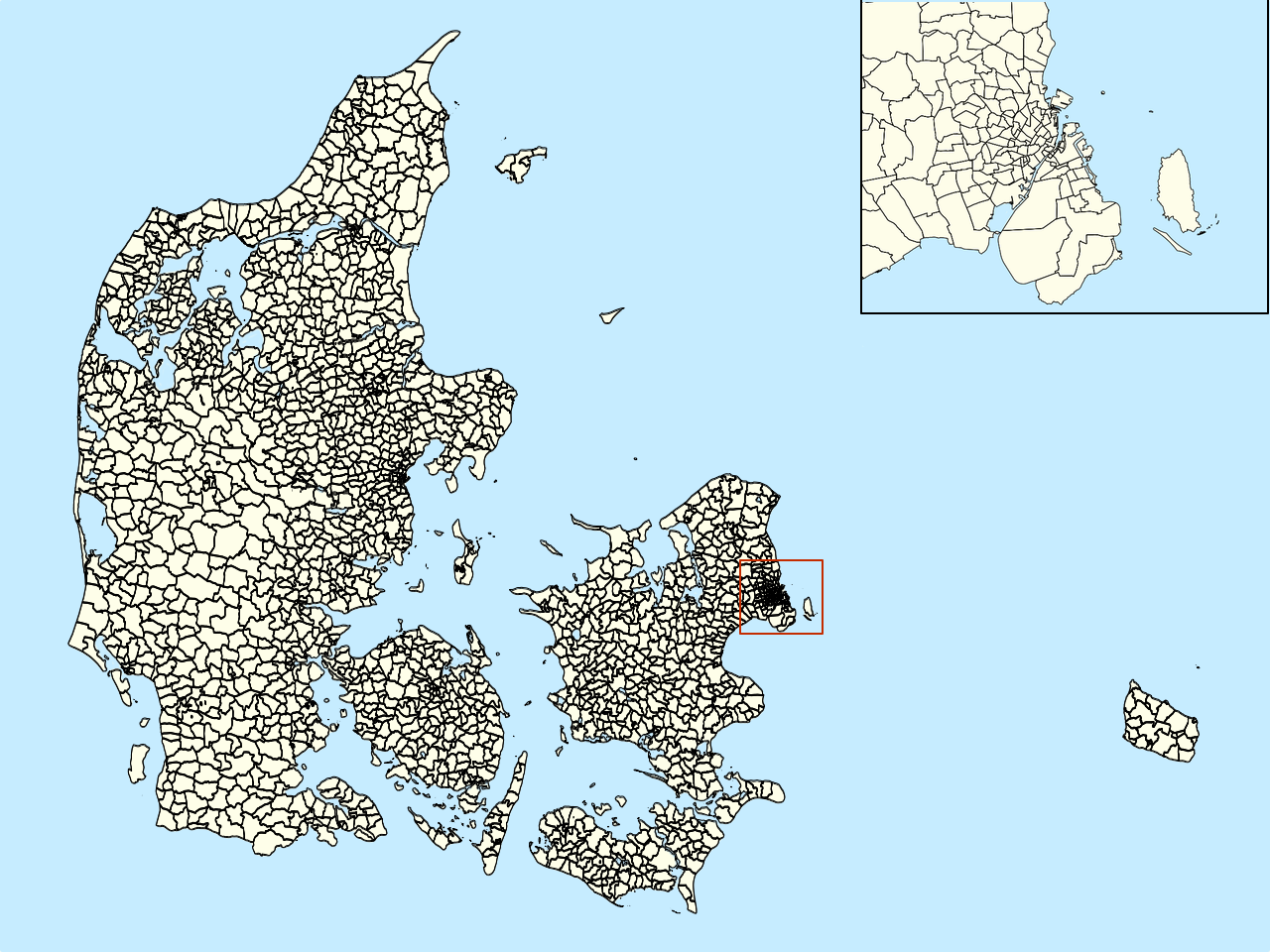
Parishes of Denmark in 2020.

In Denmark, a parish (Danish: sogn, plural sogne) is a geographically defined region within the Church of Denmark. Each parish is assigned to a physical church, and the church's administration (sognekontor) handles the area's civic registration of births, marriages and deaths. Each Danish municipality is composed of one or more parishes.

From the middle of the 19th century until the 1970 administrative reform, parishes not located in a Danish market town (købstad) also operated as the lowest level of civil administration, either individually or in groups of two or three parishes known as parish municipalities (sognekommuner). In the civil context, the parish was headed by a parish council (sogneråd), the chairman of which was called a parish chairman (sognerådsformand, literally meaning a parish council chairman).

As of 2021, there are 2,158 parishes in Denmark. The size of these parishes varies greatly, with nearly 5% having fewer than 200 inhabitants, while about 4% have more than 10,000.

== Etymology ==
The Danish term sogn comes from the Old Norse word sókn, which itself derived from the Germanic verb sōkjan, meaning "to seek" or "to search". The original use of the word referred to a parish as a region where people seek the same gathering place or the same church.

Danish sogne share etymological and historical roots with parishes in Norway, Sweden, and Finland. In Norway, parishes are called sokn or sogn. In Sweden, they are called socken. In Finland, the etymologically distinct Pitäjä is used. Although the term predates the spread of Christianity, Pitäjä came to serve a similar function to Swedish socken.

== History ==
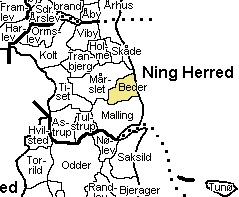
Example hierarchy of Beder parish in the Ning hundred of Aarhus County.

Danish parishes originated in the Middle Ages. Initially, a parish was the name used to refer to residents who attended the same church. Beginning in the 12th century, parish boundaries became regulated when tithes were introduced through which parish inhabitants were jointly responsible for the maintenance of their church and the priest's salary.

Following the Reformation in Denmark, the parish boundaries which had been created in the Middle Ages were reorganised and many were merged together. During the early modern period, the number of parishes in Denmark increased greatly as agricultural towns and urban cities expanded.

Especially in rural communities, the parish priest was often the only inhabitant of the parish who was proficiently literate. As a result, the priest was also used as a secular authority in the administration of the parish. In the 16th century, the secular administration was expanded when parish bailiffs were introduced. As secular parish governments expanded, they became separate from ecclesiastic functions and in some cases covered different territory.

Until the municipal reform of 1970, parish municipalities functioned as the lowest unit of civil government with responsibility mostly concerning schools, roads, unemployment and care for the invalids and the elderly without family. In 1870, there were 1097 parish municipalities. Figures before and after 1920 cannot be compared directly due to the 1920 reunification of South Jutland with Denmark.

In the 1970 municipal reform, Denmark's 88 market towns and more than 1300 parish municipalities merged to become 277 municipalities. Since 1970, municipalities normally comprise several parishes. The number of municipalities was further reduced by the 2007 municipal reform to 98.

The parish boundaries continue to play a significant role in terms of community cohesion—notably in rural areas—and are often a basis for school districts.

== Parish registers ==
Beginning in 1645, Danish pastors were required by royal legislation to record parish registers. These parish registers, also known as church books (Danish: kirkebøger), recorded church events, including births, baptisms, confirmations, deaths, and marriages that happened within a parish's jurisdiction. Initially, these registers were very unregulated and the information recorded varied greatly from one parish to the next. Parish registers from this era may be incomplete, inconsistent, and contain errors.

In 1812, new legislation was introduced which required that it be completed on regulated forms produced by a national office. It also required that two copies of the register be produced by each parish, with one copy written by the priest and one by a dean, and both stored in separate buildings to prevent the destruction of both in case of fire. Since these measures came into force, all church ceremonies have been recorded on parish registers in Denmark. Today, the register is a valuable tool for genealogical research. In 2001, civil registrations were merged into a national computerized system (Danish: elektronisk kirkebog), now handled by around 500 parish priests.

Although the register is produced by the church, it is considered legally valid. As such, all Danish citizens, regardless of their affiliation to the Church of Denmark, are required to report births to their local church authority to be recorded on the register.

== Civil and church administrations ==
Between 1662 and the Danish municipal reform of 1970, each parish was assigned to a hundred (herred) which in turn was part of a county (amt). In 1970, the hundreds lost their administrative functions and the counties were dissolved at the end of 2006. Since 2007, each municipality comprises one or more parishes, and in turn belongs to a region.

Each parish is assigned to a deanery (provsti), in turn forming part of a diocese (stift). Some parishes are administered collectively as a pastorat, with usually one or two priests providing religions services in the area.

The civic registration of births, marriages and deaths is conducted by the Church of Denmark. Historically, a number of religious minorities have been awarded the same right concerning their own members, notable the Jewish and Calvinist communities in Denmark. An exception to the historical system of parish-level registers is South Jutland where registers are kept by the local municipalities (Haderslev, Sønderborg, Tønder, and Aabenraa Municipalities). This administrative divergence dates from 1864–1920, when the region was part of Prussia.

== See also ==
- Lists of Danish parishes by region:
  - List of parishes in the Capital Region of Denmark
  - List of parishes in the Central Denmark Region
  - List of parishes in the North Jutland Region
  - List of parishes in the Region of Southern Denmark
  - List of parishes in Region Zealand
- Danish municipal reforms of 1970 and of 2007
- Other administrative units (current or historical) in Denmark, roughly in decreasing order of size:
  - Regions of Denmark
  - Counties of Denmark
  - Hundreds of Denmark
  - Municipalities of Denmark
  - Market town#Denmark
- Socken, the equivalent unit in Sweden
