= 2025 Aabenraa municipal election =

Municipal election in Denmark

- 18 November 2025

All 31 seats to the Aabenraa municipal council 16 seats needed for a majority
- Turnout: 31,149 (66.4%) ▼0.1%
	First party	Second party	Third party
	V	C	A
Party	Venstre	Conservatives	Social Democrats
Last election	11 seats, 33.4%	4 seats, 11.6%	9 seats, 28.3%
Seats won	7	6	6
Seat change	▼4	▲2	▼3
Popular vote	6,965	5,782	5,326
Percentage	22.8%	18.9%	17.4%
Swing	▼10.7%	▲7.3%	▼10.9%
	Fourth party	Fifth party	Sixth party
	O	Æ	F
Party	Danish People's Party	Denmark Democrats	Green Left
Last election	2 seats, 5.9%	Did not stand	1 seat, 3.3%
Seats won	4	2	2
Seat change	▲2	▲2	▲1
Popular vote	3,473	2,062	2,018
Percentage	11.3%	6.7%	6.6%
Swing	▲5.5%	New	▲3.3%
	Seventh party	Eighth party	Ninth party
	S	I	B
Party	Schleswig Party	Liberal Alliance	Social Liberals
Last election	2 seats, 7.4%	0 seats, 0.6%	Did not stand
Seats won	2	1	1
Seat change	0	▲1	▲1
Popular vote	1,699	1,413	612
Percentage	5.6%	4.6%	2.0%
Swing	▼1.8%	▲4.1%	New
Mayor before election
Jan Riber Jakobsen
Conservatives
Mayor after election
Jan Riber Jakobsen
Conservatives

The 2025 Aabenraa Municipal election was held on November 18, 2025, to elect the 31 members to sit in the regional council for the Aabenraa Municipal council, in the period of 2026 to 2029. Jan Riber Jakobsen from the Conservatives, would secure re-election.

== Background ==
Following the 2021 election, Jan Riber Jakobsen from the Conservatives became mayor for his first term. He would run for a second term.

== Electoral system ==
For elections to Danish municipalities, a number varying from 9 to 31 are chosen to be elected to the municipal council. The seats are then allocated using the D'Hondt method and a closed list proportional representation. Aabenraa Municipality had 31 seats in 2025.

== Electoral alliances ==
=== Electoral Alliance 1 ===
Party		Political alignment
A	Social Democrats	Centre-left
F	Green Left	Centre-left to Left-wing

=== Electoral Alliance 2 ===
Party		Political alignment
B	Social Liberals	Centre to Centre-left
K	Christian Democrats	Centre to Centre-right
M	Moderates	Centre to Centre-right
S	Schleswig Party	Centre (Regionalism)

=== Electoral Alliance 3 ===
Party		Political alignment
E	Smilla og Borgernes Liste	Local politics
J	borgernes lokalliste	Local politics

=== Electoral Alliance 4 ===
Party		Political alignment
I	Liberal Alliance	Centre-right to Right-wing
O	Danish People's Party	Right-wing to Far-right
Æ	Denmark Democrats	Right-wing to Far-right

== Results by polling station ==
Division	A	B	C	E	F	I	J	K	M	O	S	V	Æ	Ø
Division	%	%	%	%	%	%	%	%	%	%	%	%	%	%
Hovslund	14.9	1.0	12.7	0.2	3.6	5.0	1.2	0.7	0.2	18.5	2.6	24.5	12.5	2.2
Hellevad	13.8	0.8	10.4	0.4	3.8	6.1	0.8	0.6	0.8	14.8	3.4	35.0	7.8	1.3
Rødekro	20.9	1.4	20.4	0.5	4.6	4.8	0.6	0.4	1.3	12.5	2.2	22.7	7.0	0.7
Løjt	16.7	2.8	17.7	0.1	9.9	4.2	3.0	0.5	2.0	8.8	3.9	22.0	7.1	1.3
Hjordkær	14.7	1.3	24.5	0.6	4.4	3.8	0.5	0.4	0.7	26.7	0.8	12.5	8.3	0.9
Ravsted	6.3	0.0	8.0	0.2	3.1	4.2	0.7	0.7	0.2	10.7	12.5	37.3	15.8	0.2
Bolderslev	13.8	0.6	12.9	0.6	2.5	4.0	0.5	0.4	0.8	13.2	8.4	25.1	16.2	1.0
Ensted	16.0	3.0	18.0	0.5	7.9	7.6	0.3	0.4	1.4	10.4	2.2	23.7	7.3	1.1
Felsted	11.5	1.7	14.9	0.2	5.2	4.8	0.8	0.6	1.4	12.6	1.9	36.2	6.9	1.3
Varnæs	14.6	1.6	27.2	0.0	7.0	3.3	0.3	0.6	0.8	10.9	2.5	25.3	5.1	0.8
Bylderup	8.1	0.2	12.6	1.0	2.2	2.6	0.2	2.4	0.9	9.3	28.8	23.0	8.1	0.6
Tinglev	12.6	0.5	16.7	0.2	5.1	3.5	0.4	0.8	0.8	12.4	14.8	23.7	7.8	0.8
Kliplev	10.8	1.4	10.6	0.3	4.9	4.0	0.5	0.2	0.7	9.5	3.4	47.2	5.5	0.9
Kruså	12.9	1.8	22.2	0.1	8.2	4.6	0.1	0.1	0.9	11.9	6.3	23.4	6.8	0.8
Padborg	16.0	1.3	32.8	0.1	5.2	2.8	0.5	0.0	0.4	11.4	5.8	16.2	5.8	1.8
Aabenraa Midt	21.4	3.4	18.8	0.4	8.6	6.1	0.8	0.3	1.7	9.3	4.8	18.8	3.8	1.9
Aabenraa Syd	23.3	3.5	18.0	0.2	8.6	4.5	0.3	0.2	1.8	9.3	3.1	20.8	4.3	2.1
Aabenraa Nord	29.6	2.0	15.0	0.4	9.0	4.9	0.9	0.6	1.2	9.6	2.4	14.6	7.2	2.6

== Results ==
Party		Votes	%	+/-	Seats	+/-
Aabenraa Municipality
V	Venstre	6,965	22.75	-10.68	7	-4
C	Conservatives	5,782	18.89	+7.33	6	+2
A	Social Democrats	5,326	17.40	-10.91	6	-3
O	Danish People's Party	3,473	11.35	+5.49	4	+2
Æ	Denmark Democrats	2,062	6.74	New	2	New
F	Green Left	2,018	6.59	+3.34	2	+1
S	Schleswig Party	1,699	5.55	-1.81	2	0
I	Liberal Alliance	1,413	4.62	+4.05	1	+1
B	Social Liberals	612	2.00	New	1	New
Ø	Red-Green Alliance	410	1.34	-0.37	0	0
M	Moderates	370	1.21	New	0	New
J	borgernes lokalliste	232	0.76	New	0	New
K	Christian Democrats	143	0.47	-0.29	0	0
E	Smilla og Borgernes Liste	105	0.34	New	0	New
Total		30,610	100	N/A	31	N/A
Invalid votes		96	0.20	-0.09		
Blank votes		443	0.94	+0.13		
Turnout		31,149	66.44	-0.10		
Source: valg.dk

== Opinion polls ==
Polling firm	Fieldwork date	Sample size	V	A	C	S	O	F	Ø	K	I	B	E	J	M	Æ	Others	Lead
Epinion	4 Sep - 13 Oct 2025	430	19.2	17.9	12.4	6.7	10.3	6.2	3.1	–	4.2	0.7	–	–	3.0	16.0	0.1	1.3
2024 european parliament election	9 Jun 2024		22.7	17.6	7.6	–	9.7	9.6	2.6	–	7.1	3.6	–	–	4.9	13.4	–	5.1
2022 general election	1 Nov 2022		15.9	28.8	4.6	–	3.4	4.3	1.8	0.7	6.6	2.0	–	–	8.1	14.2	–	12.9
2021 regional election	16 Nov 2021		46.0	23.8	6.2	–	4.7	4.2	2.5	1.4	0.8	1.9	–	–	–	–	–	22.2
2021 municipal election	16 Nov 2021		33.4 (11)	28.3 (9)	11.6 (4)	7.4 (2)	5.9 (2)	3.3 (1)	1.7 (0)	0.8 (0)	0.6 (0)	–	–	–	–	–	–	5.1
