= Søgård =

Village in Southern Denmark

- Village
- Location in Region of Southern Denmark Søgård (Denmark)
- Coordinates: 54°55′48″N 9°26′42″E
- Country: Denmark
- Region: Southern Denmark
- Municipality: Aabenraa

Area
  - Urban: 0.22 km^{2} (0.085 sq mi)

Population (2026)
  - Urban: 299
  - Urban density: 1,400/km^{2} (3,500/sq mi)
- Time zone: UTC+1 (CET)
  - Summer (DST): UTC+2 (CEST)
- Postal code: DK-6200 Aabenraa
- Website: www.aabenraa.dk

Søgård is a village in Aabenraa Municipality, Region of Southern Denmark, with a population of 299 as of 1 January, 2026. Søgård is located 5 km east of Kliplev, 5 km west of Kværs, 15 km south of Aabenraa, and 15 km north of Padborg.

Søgård belongs to Kliplev Parish.

The new Sønderborg Motorway has exits and entrances to and from Søgård. One exit is Exit 15 on Secondary Route 170.
