= Tinglev =

- Town
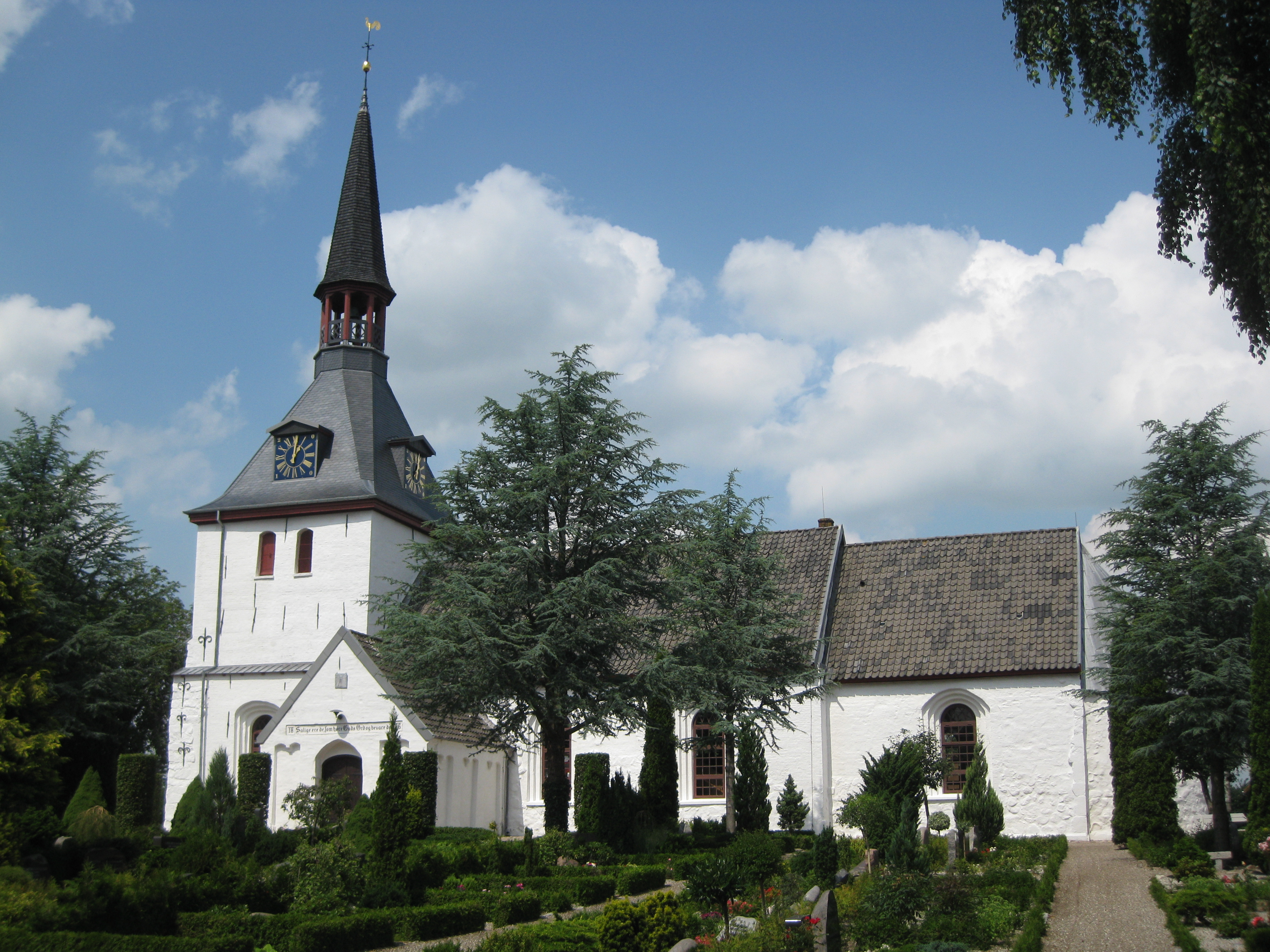
- Tinglev Church from around 1100.

- Location in Denmark Tinglev (Region of Southern Denmark)
- Coordinates: 54°56′11″N 9°15′30″E
- Country: Denmark
- Region: Southern Denmark
- Municipality: Aabenraa Municipality
- Parish: Tinglev Parish

Area
  - Urban: 3.1 km^{2} (1.2 sq mi)

Population (2026)
  - Urban: 2,761
  - Urban density: 890/km^{2} (2,300/sq mi)
- Time zone: UTC+1 (CET)
  - Summer (DST): UTC+2 (CEST)
- Postal code: DK-6360 Tinglev

Tinglev (German: Tingleff) is a town with a population of 2,761 (1 January 2026) in Aabenraa Municipality in Region of Southern Denmark on the Jutland peninsula in south Denmark. Tinglev is a base for German minority institutions in Southern Jutland, the minority Schleswig Party receiving 14.8% of the town's vote in the municipal elections of 2025.

From 1866 until 1920, Tinglev was part of the Prussian Province of Schleswig-Holstein and formed a part of Imperial Germany. Notable figures born there include Hjalmar Schacht, a liberal economist who introduced a wide variety of schemes in Germany before and during The Third Reich to tackle the effects that the Great Depression had on that country, and was a key player in Nazi Germany's economic steps towards re-armament.

== Tinglev Municipality ==
Until 1 January 2007, Tinglev was also a municipality (Danish: kommune) in the former South Jutland County. The city covered an area of 326 km^{2} (126 sq mi), with a total population of 10,148 (2005). Its last mayor was Susanne Beier, a member of the Venstre (Liberal Party) political party. The municipality was created in 1970 due to a kommunalreform ("Municipality Reform") that combined several existing parishes:

- Bjolderup Parish
- Burkal Parish
- Bylderup Parish
- Ravsted Parish
- Tinglev Parish
- Uge Parish

Tinglev municipality ceased to exist due to the Kommunalreformen ("The Municipality Reform" of 2007). It was merged with Bov, Lundtoft, Rødekro, and Aabenraa municipalities to form the new Aabenraa Municipality. This created a municipality with an area of 951 square kilometres (367 sq mi) and a total population of 60,151 (2005).

== Notable people ==
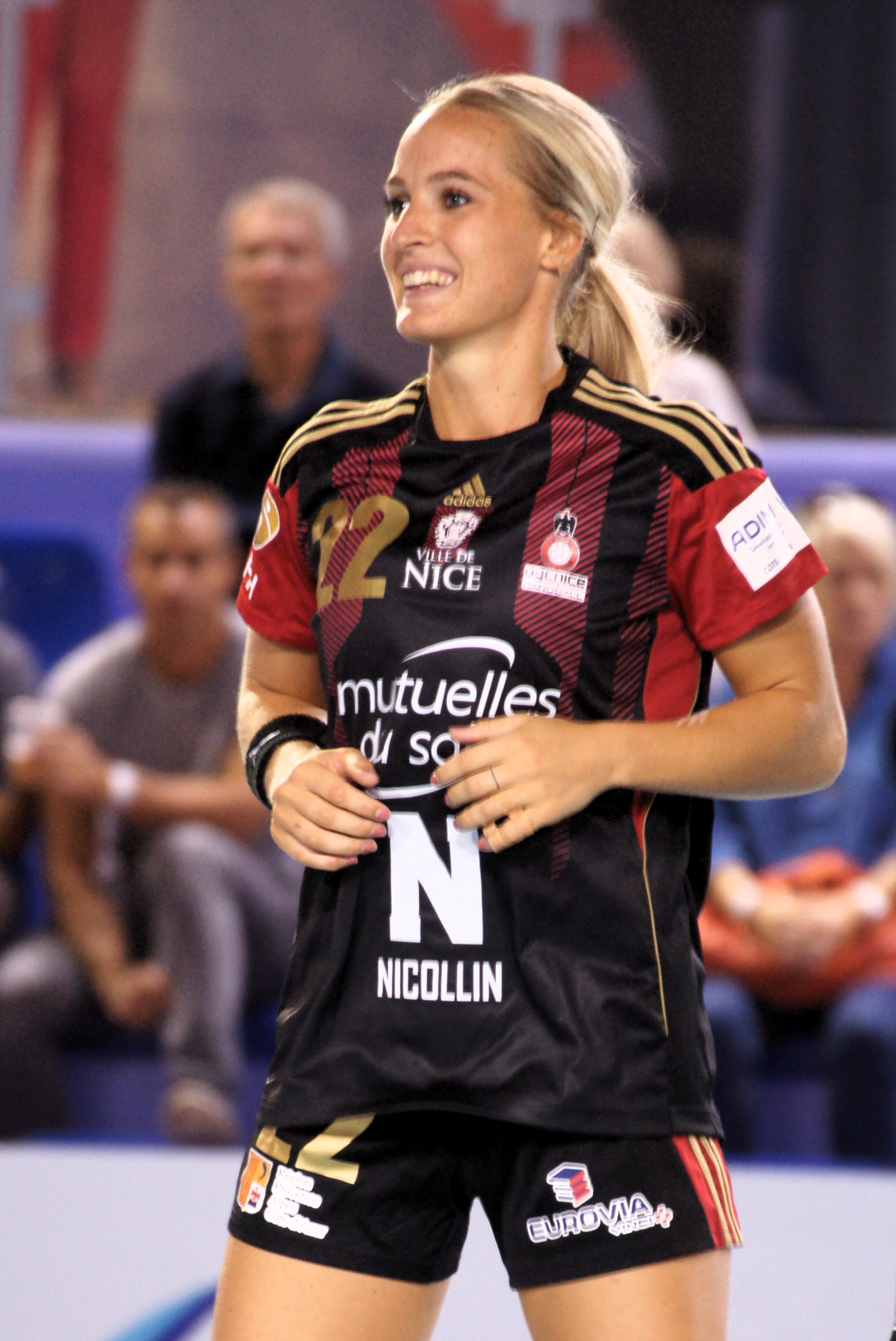
Jane Schumacher, 2016

- Hjalmar Schacht (1877 in Tingleff – 1970) was a German economist, banker and politician
- Jens Jessen (1895 in Tingleff - 1944) was a German economist, national socialist and resistance fighter
- Jane Schumacher (born 1988 in Tinglev) is a Danish team handball player
- Line Vedel Hansen (born 1989), a Danish professional golfer, lives in Tinglev

== In popular culture ==
The adventure role-playing game Gerda: A Flame in Winter, developed by Copenhagen-based games studio PortaPlay and published in 2022 by Don't Nod, is set entirely in Tinglev and the surrounding countryside. The game's story was inspired by the life of director Hans Von Knut Skovfoged's half-German, half-Danish grandmother who contributed to the Resistance against the Nazis.
