= Bylderup-Bov =

Town in Southern Denmark

Bylderup-Bov Bülderup-Bau (German)
- Town
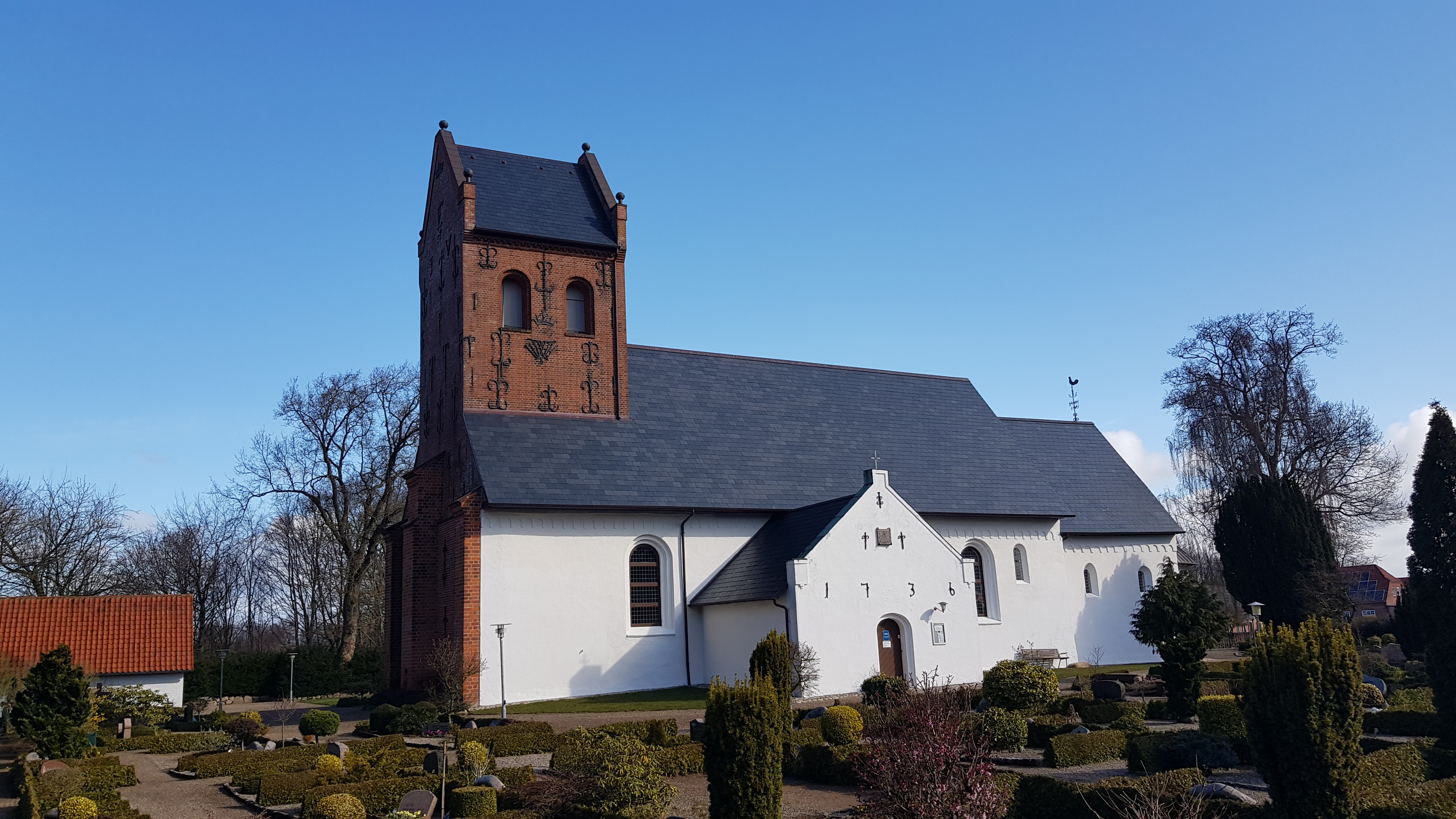
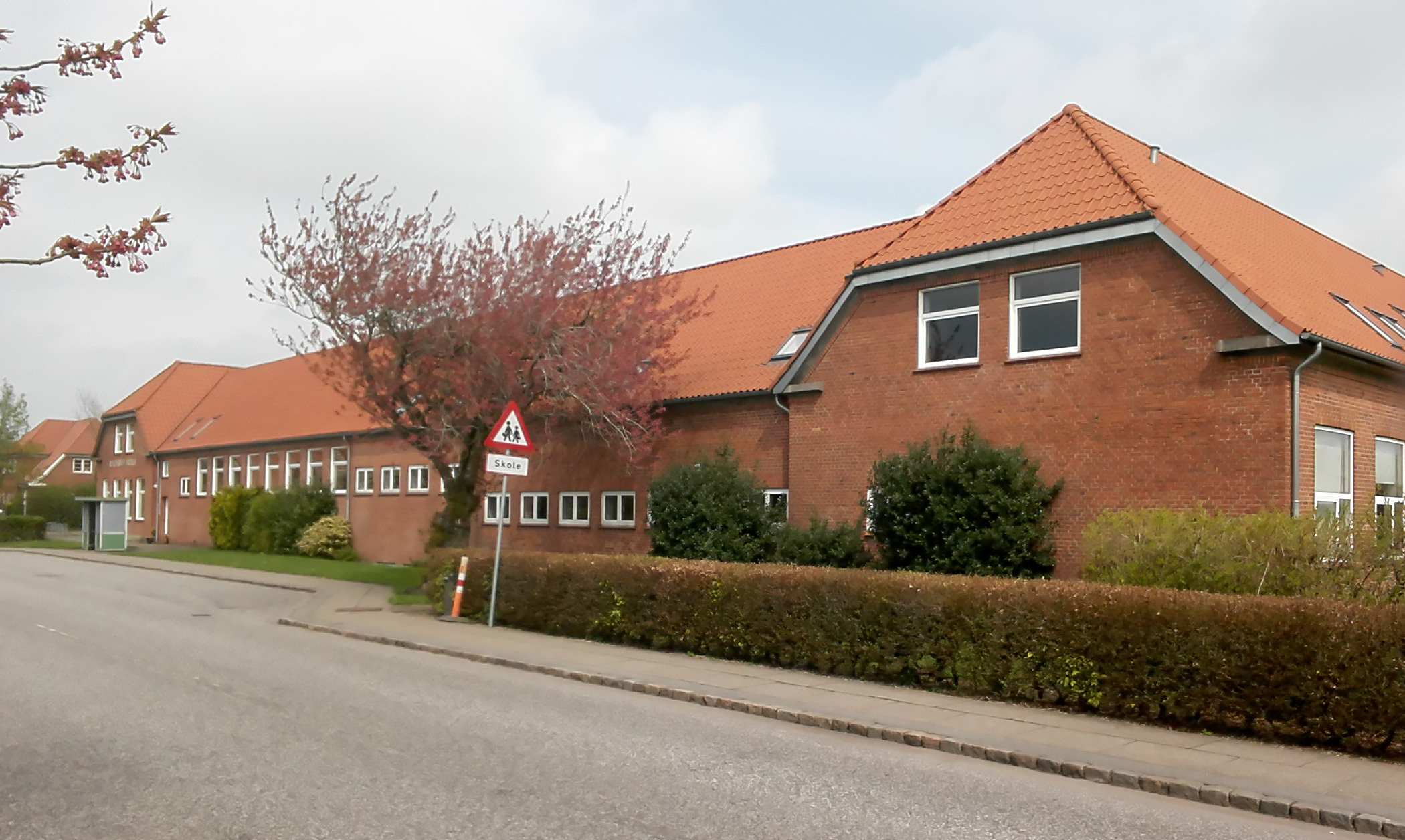
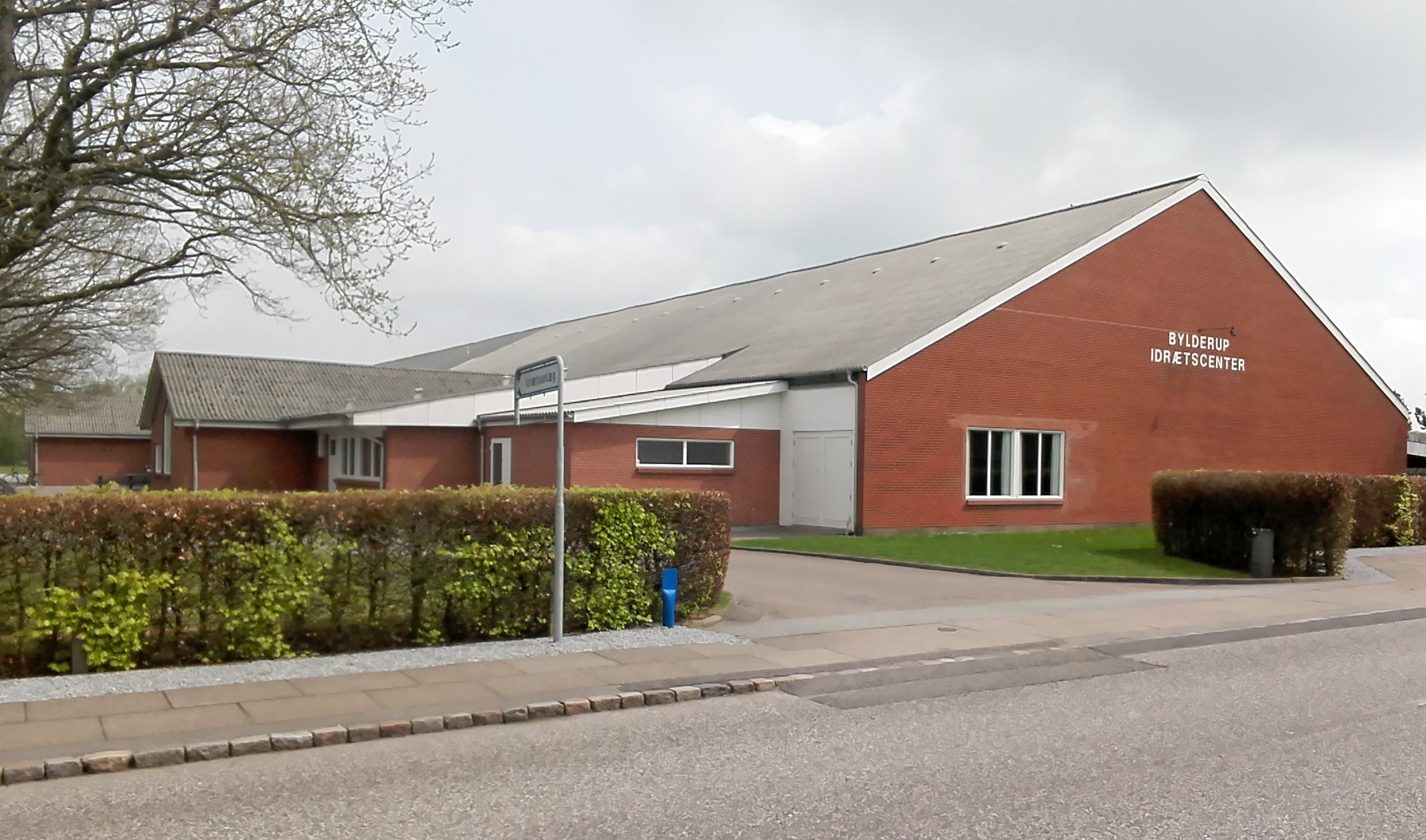
- Bylderup Church School in Bylderup-Bov Bylderup-Bov Sports-Center

- Location in Denmark Bylderup-Bov (Region of Southern Denmark)
- Coordinates: 54°56′43″N 9°5′32″E
- Country: Denmark
- Region: Southern Denmark
- Municipality: Aabenraa

Area
  - Urban: 1.5 km^{2} (0.58 sq mi)

Population (2026)
  - Urban: 1,277
  - Urban density: 850/km^{2} (2,200/sq mi)
- Time zone: UTC+1 (CET)
  - Summer (DST): UTC+2 (CEST)
- Postal code: DK-6372 Bylderup-Bov
- Website: www.bylderup-bov.dk

Bylderup-Bov (German: Bülderup-Bau) is a town in Aabenraa Municipality, within the Region of Southern Denmark. It had a population of 1,277 as of 1 January 2026. It is located 15 km (9 mi) east of Tønder, 12 km (7 mi) west of Tinglev, 20 km (12 mi) southeast of Løgumkloster and 25 km (16 mi) southwest of Aabenraa.

The town originated as two separate railway towns, named Bylderup and Bov, which were later merged. There are three districts aside from the town center: Bov, to the southwest, Bylderup to the southeast, and Lendemark to the northwest (direction relative to the town center).

== History ==
The Tønder-Tinglev line was founded in 1867 and had a stop between Bylderup and Bov. The station lied within the Burkal Parish, so Bov was naturally included in the station’s name, but there were discussions in Bylderup Parish over the name. The nearby village of Lendemark wanted to have the station named Lendemark-Bov, but the station was ultimately named Bylderup-Bov due to the fact that there were and still are more inhabitants in Bylderup than in Lendemark.

== Religion ==
Bylderup-Bov belongs to Bylderup Parish. The Bylderup Church, built in a Romanesque style, is located in the town. Some parts of the church date back to the 13th century. The former village of Bov is part of Burkal Parish. The Burkal Church lies 1.5 km (1 mi) southwest of Bylderup-Bov.
