= Aabenraa County =

County in Denmark 1920–1932

Coordinates: 55.049269°N 9.404297°E

Aabenraa County Åbenrå Amt
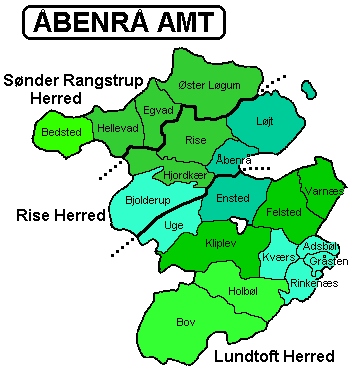
- Aabenraa County. The entire province became part of South Jutland County in 1970.
- Country: Denmark
- Established: 1920
- Dissolved: 1970

Aabenraa County (Danish: Åbenrå Amt, former spelling: Aabenraa Amt) is a former province in Denmark, located on the east-central region of Southern Jutland. Aabenraa County was established in 1920 following the reunification of Denmark and South Jutland following the Schleswig Plebiscites. It was dissolved in 1970 when it merged with three other counties to form South Jutland County. Aabenraa County corresponded geographically to the former Prussian Kreis Apenrade combined with the larger part of Bov Parish and Frøslev municipality (Handewitt / Hanved Parish). Both were transferred from Kreis Flensburg with the establishment of the current Danish-German border. Aabenraa County and Sønderborg County merged in 1932, forming Aabenraa-Sønderborg County.

== 1970 administrative reform ==
Aabenraa-Sønderborg County was dissolved in the 1970 administrative reform and the former Aabenraa County became seven new municipalities belonging to South Jutland County:

- Bov
- Gråsten
- Lundtoft
- Løgumkloster
- Rødekro
- Tinglev
- Aabenraa

== List of former hundreds (herreder) ==
- Lundtoft Herred
- Rise Herred
- Sønder-Rangstrup Herred

== See also ==
- Aabenraa
