= Aabenraa (disambiguation) =

Aabenraa is a city in south-western Denmark.

Aabenraa may also refer to:

- Åbenrå (street) in central Copenhagen
- Aabenraa Municipality, a municipality (Danish: kommune) in the southern region of Denmark
- Aabenraa County, a former province in south-western Denmark
