= Genner Parish =

Parish in Aabenraa Municipality, Denmark

Genner Parish Genner Sogn
- Parish
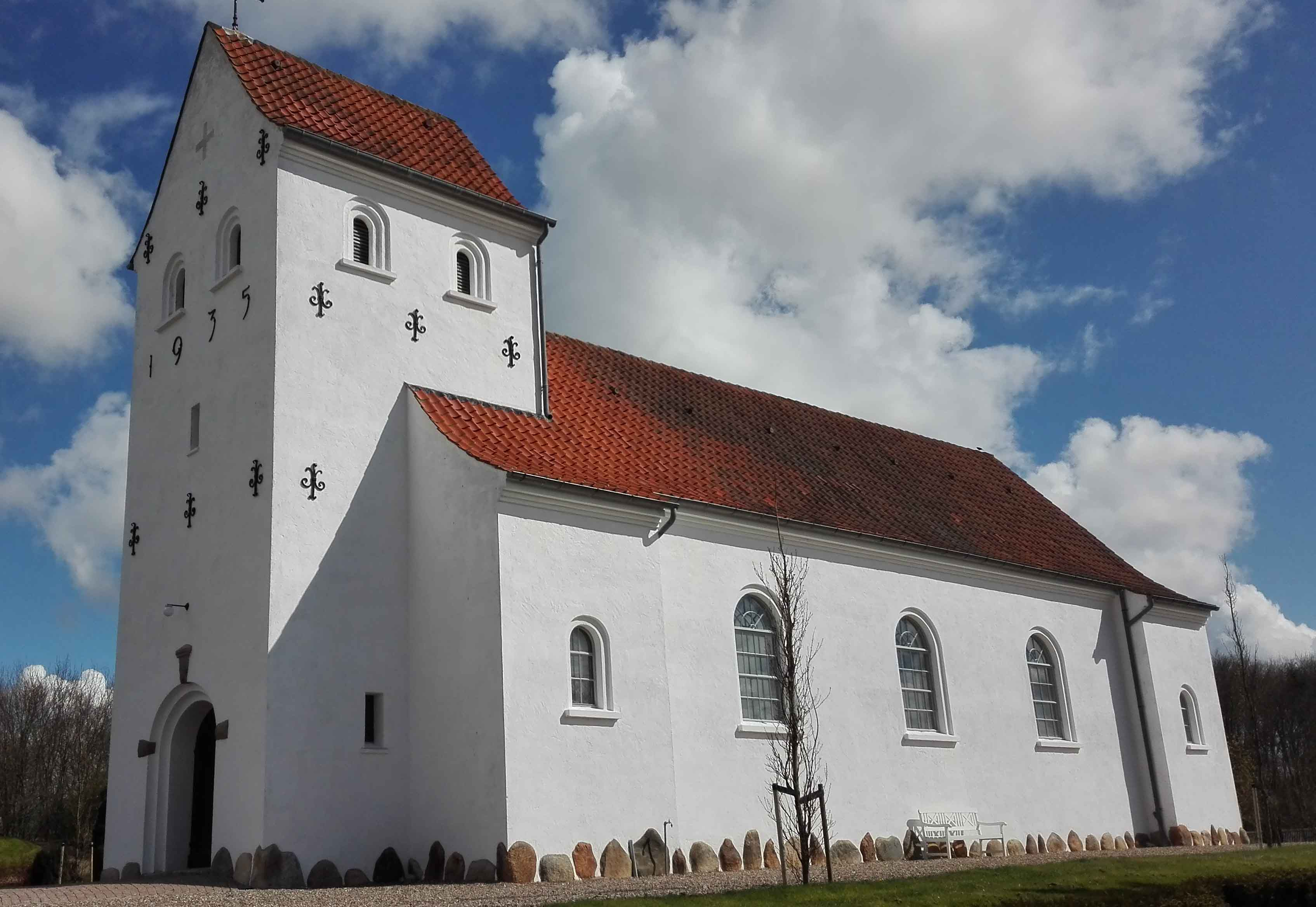
- Genner Church
- Interactive map of Genner Parish
- Country: Denmark
- Region: Southern Denmark
- Municipality: Aabenraa Municipality
- Diocese: Haderslev

Population (2025)
  - Total: 899
- Parish number: 9260

Genner Parish (Danish: Genner Sogn) is a parish in the Diocese of Haderslev in Aabenraa Municipality, Denmark.
