= Bjolderup Parish =

Parish in Aabenraa Municipality, Denmark

Bjolderup Parish Bjolderup Sogn
- Parish
- The parish within Aabenraa Municipality
- Coordinates: 54°59′45″N 9°15′17″E
- Country: Denmark
- Region: Southern Denmark
- Municipality: Aabenraa Municipality
- Diocese: Haderslev

Population (2025)
  - Total: 1,708
- Parish number: 9013

Bjolderup Parish (Danish: Bjolderup Sogn) is a parish in the Diocese of Haderslev in Aabenraa Municipality, Denmark.
