= Felsted, Denmark =

Felsted
- Town
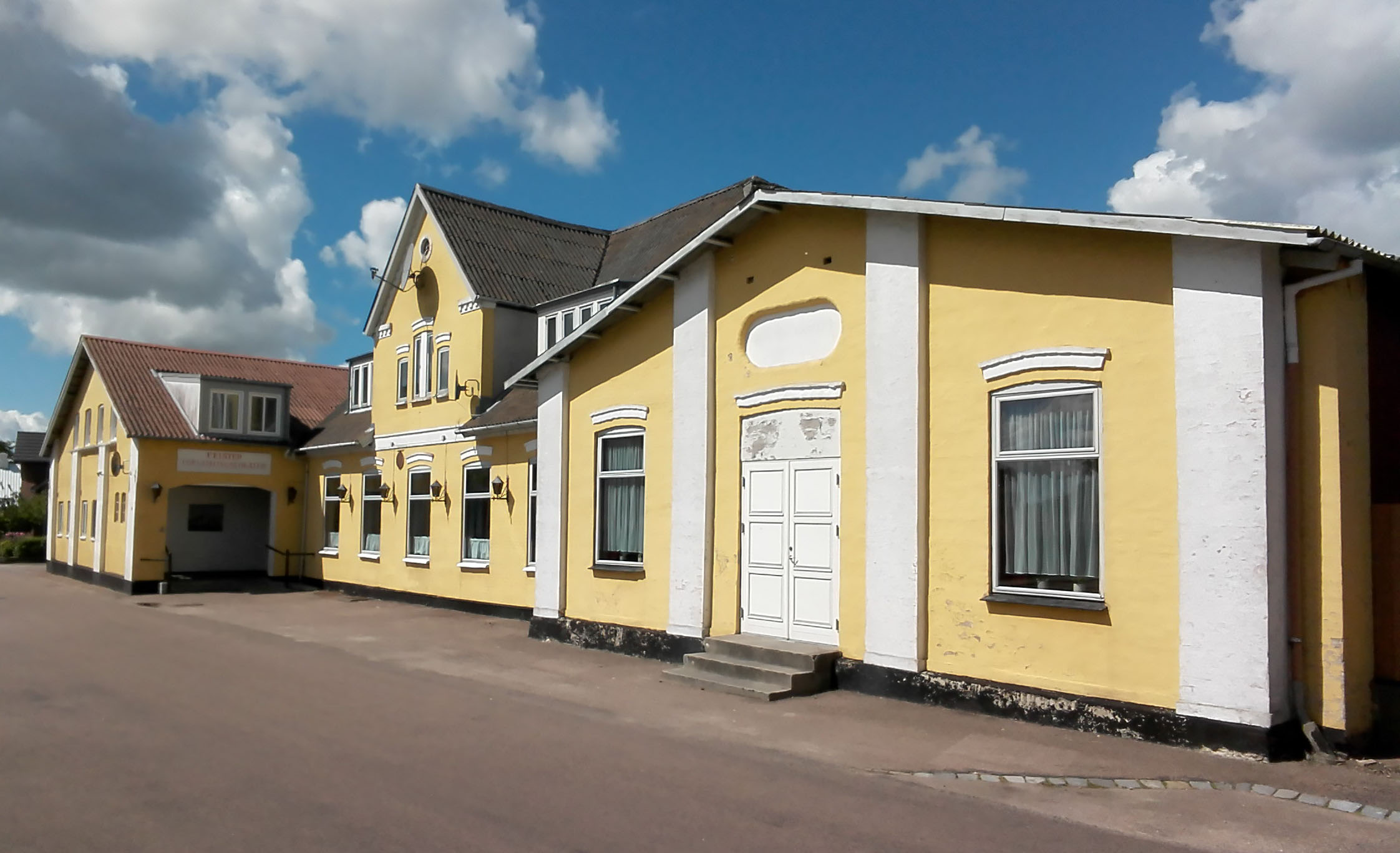
- The village hall in Felsted

- Location in Region of Southern Denmark Felsted (Denmark)
- Coordinates: 54°58′39″N 9°29′54″E
- Country: Denmark
- Region: Southern Denmark
- Municipality: Aabenraa Municipality
- Parish: Felsted

Area
  - Urban: 0.8 km^{2} (0.31 sq mi)

Population (2026)
  - Urban: 1,092
  - Urban density: 1,400/km^{2} (3,500/sq mi)
- Time zone: UTC+1 (CET)
  - Summer (DST): UTC+2 (CEST)
- Postal code: DK-6200 Aabenraa

Felsted is a small town, with a population of 1,092 (1 January 2026), in Aabenraa Municipality, Region of Southern Denmark in Denmark. It is located 6 km southeast of Stubbæk, 12 km northwest of Gråsten, 23 km northwest of Sønderborg and 11 km southeast of Aabenraa.

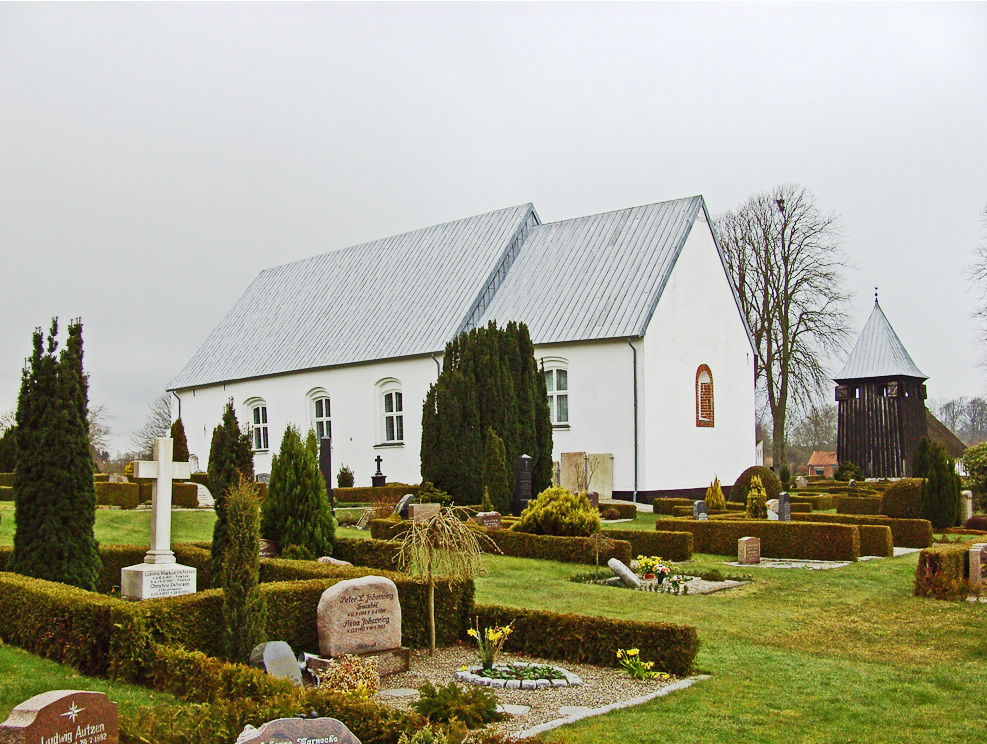
Felsted Church

Felsted Church, built around 1250, is located on the southwestern outskirts of the town.

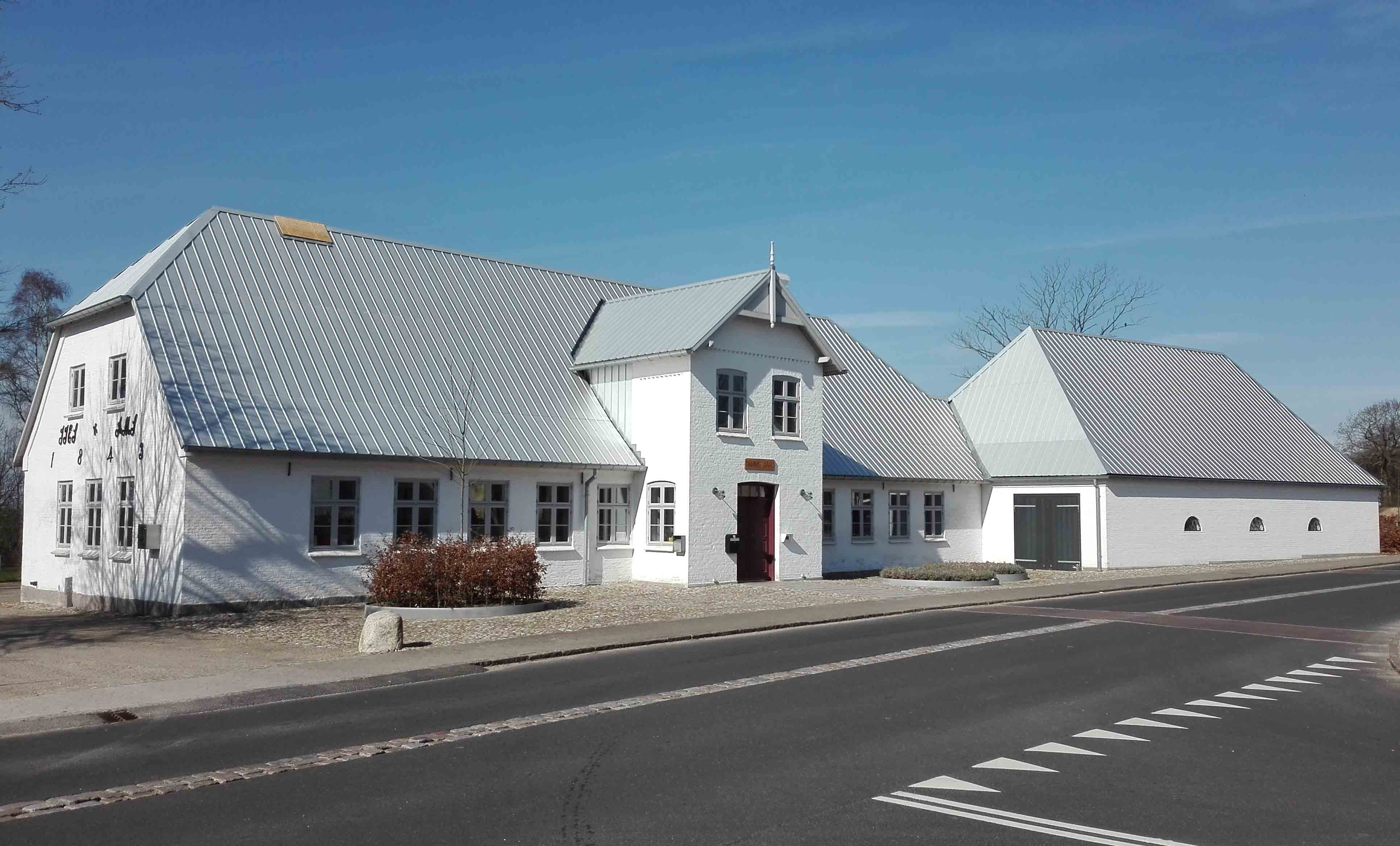
Damms Gård, the community centre in Felsted

Damms Gård is located in the centre of the town. It was originally a farm used as a smithy and inn and was later renovated and converted into a community centre in 2014.
