= Holbøl Parish =

Parish in Aabenraa Municipality, Denmark

Coordinates: 54.8947°N 9.4436°E

Holbøl Parish Holbøl Sogn
- Parish
- The parish within Aabenraa Municipality
- Country: Denmark
- Region: Southern Denmark
- Municipality: Aabenraa Municipality
- Diocese: Haderslev

Population (2025)
  - Total: 1,462
- Parish number: 9024

Holbøl Parish (Danish: Holbøl Sogn) is a parish in the Diocese of Haderslev in Aabenraa Municipality, Denmark.
