= Lundtoft Municipality =

Former municipality of Denmark

Coordinates: 54°55′N 9°27′E

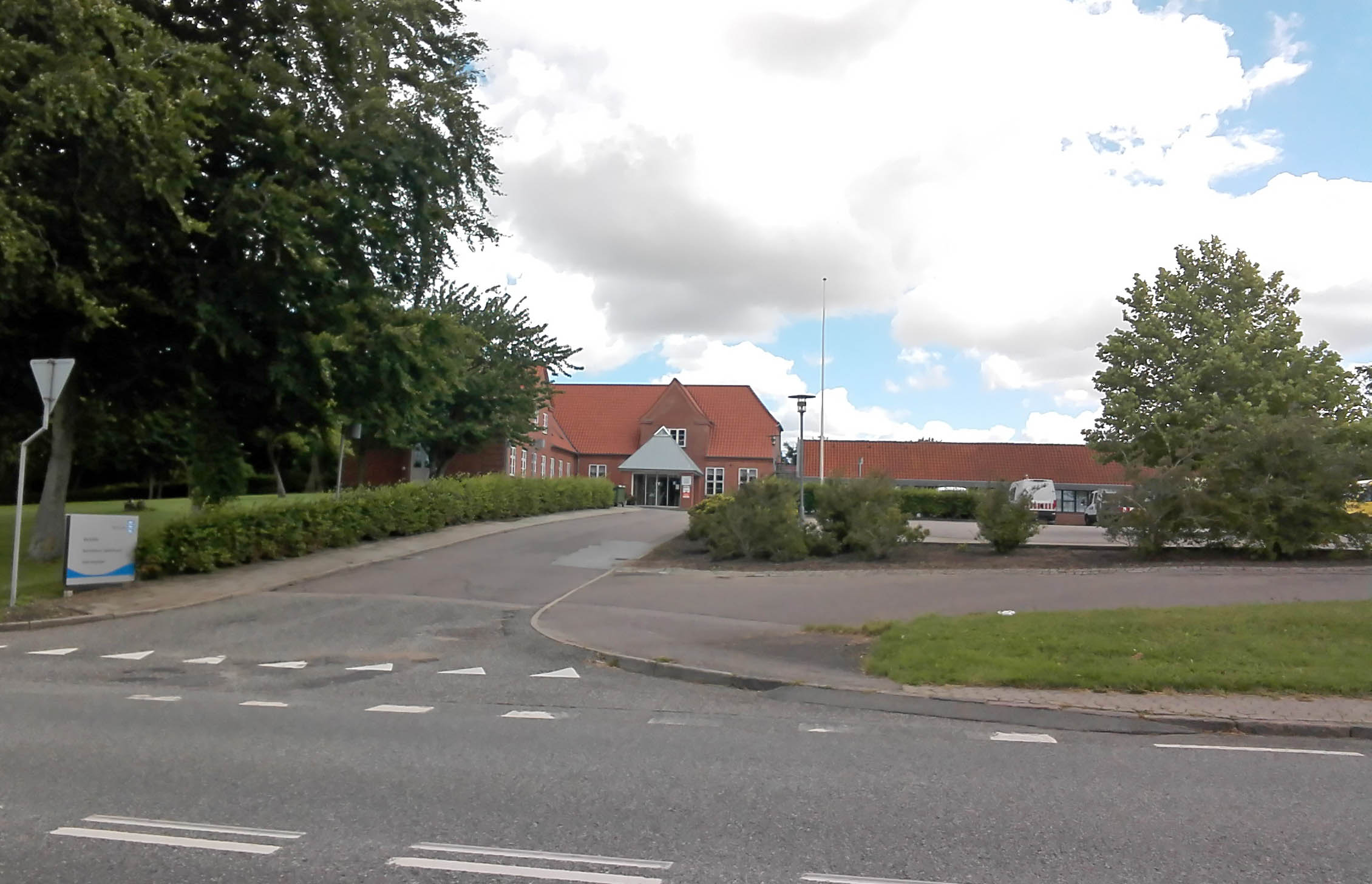
Road and building in the municipality

Until 1 January 2007 Lundtoft was a municipality (Danish, kommune) in South Jutland County on the east coast of the Jutland peninsula in south Denmark. The municipality covered an area of 137 km^{2}, and had a total population of 6,184 (2005). Its last mayor was Hans Philip Tietje, a member of the Venstre (Liberal Party) political party. The main town and the site of its municipal council was the town of Aabenraa, which it shared with neighboring Aabenraa Municipality.

The municipality was created in 1970 due to a kommunalreform ("Municipality Reform") that combined a number of existing parishes:

- Felsted Parish
- Kliplev Parish
- Varnæs Parish

Lundtoft municipality ceased to exist as the result of Kommunalreformen ("The Municipality Reform" of 2007). It was merged with Bov, Rødekro, Tinglev, and Aabenraa municipalities to form the new Aabenraa municipality. This created a municipality with an area of 951 km^{2} and a total population of 60,151 (2005). The new municipality belongs to Region of Southern Denmark.
