= Stubbæk =

Town in Southern Denmark

- Town
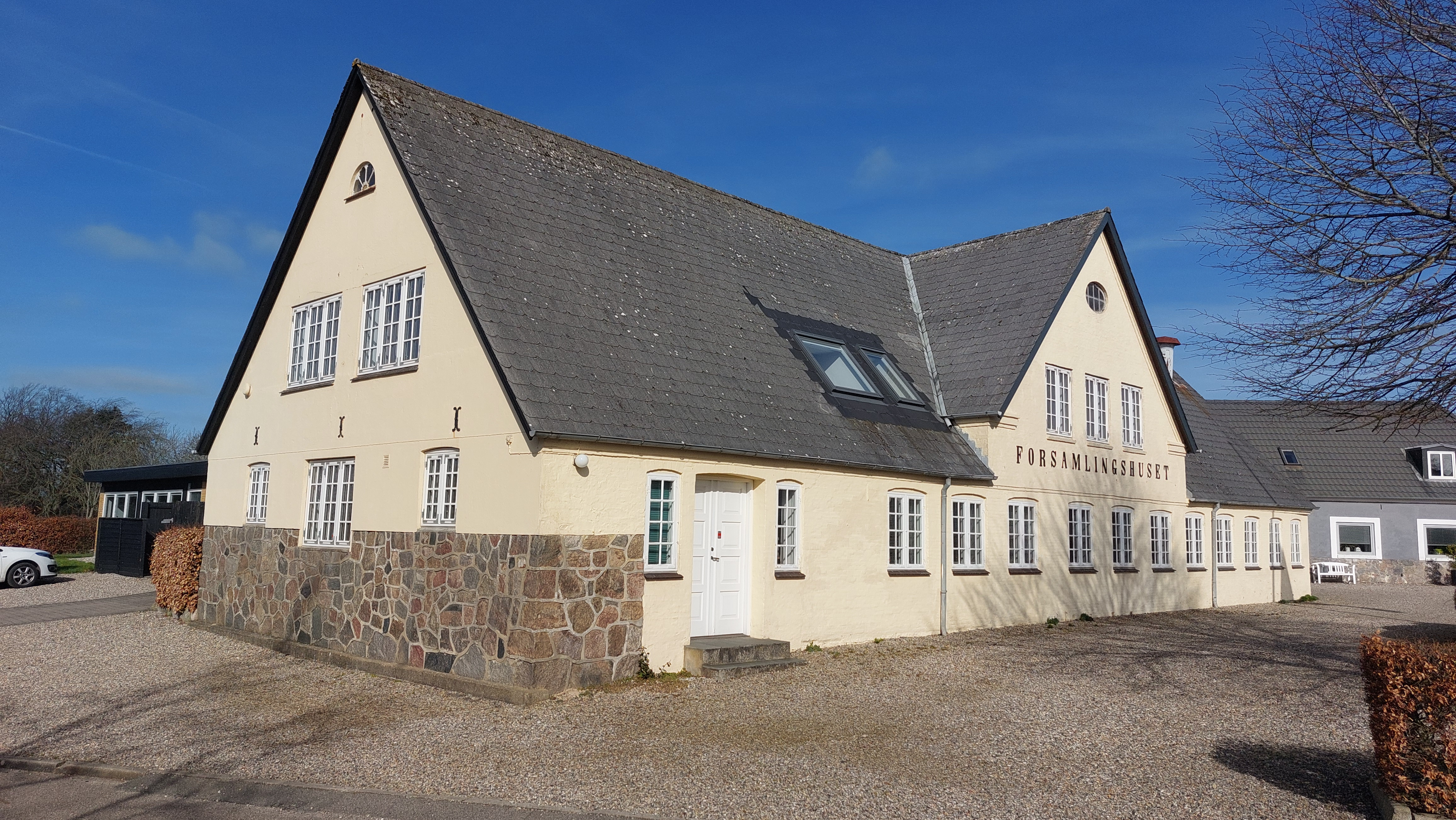
- The village hall in Stubbæk

- Location in Denmark Stubbæk (Region of Southern Denmark)
- Coordinates: 54°59′54″N 9°25′48″E
- Country: Denmark
- Region: Southern Denmark
- Municipality: Aabenraa
- Parish: Ensted Parish

Area
  - Urban: 0.9 km^{2} (0.35 sq mi)

Population (2026)
  - Urban: 1,180
  - Urban density: 1,300/km^{2} (3,400/sq mi)
- Time zone: UTC+1 (CET)
  - Summer (DST): UTC+2 (CEST)
- Postal code: DK-6200 Aabenraa
- Website: www.aabenraa.dk

Stubbæk is a town in Aabenraa Municipality, Region of Southern Denmark, with a population of 1,180 as of 1 January, 2026. It is located 20 km north of Kruså, 17 km northwest of Gråsten, and 6 km south of Aabenraa.

== History ==
=== Railways ===
There was a train station 1 km northeast of Stubbæk on the Aabenraa County Railway line Aabenraa-Gråsten from 1899 to 1926. The railway's high dam has been preserved, but it is difficult to access.

=== Memorial Hill ===
In front of the community center there is a memorial hill with 11 stones, representing the history of Southern Jutland, including one that was added in 1937 to commemorate the 1920 Schleswig plebiscites.
