= Tinglev Parish =

Parish in Aabenraa Municipality, Denmark

Tinglev Parish Tinglev Sogn
- Parish
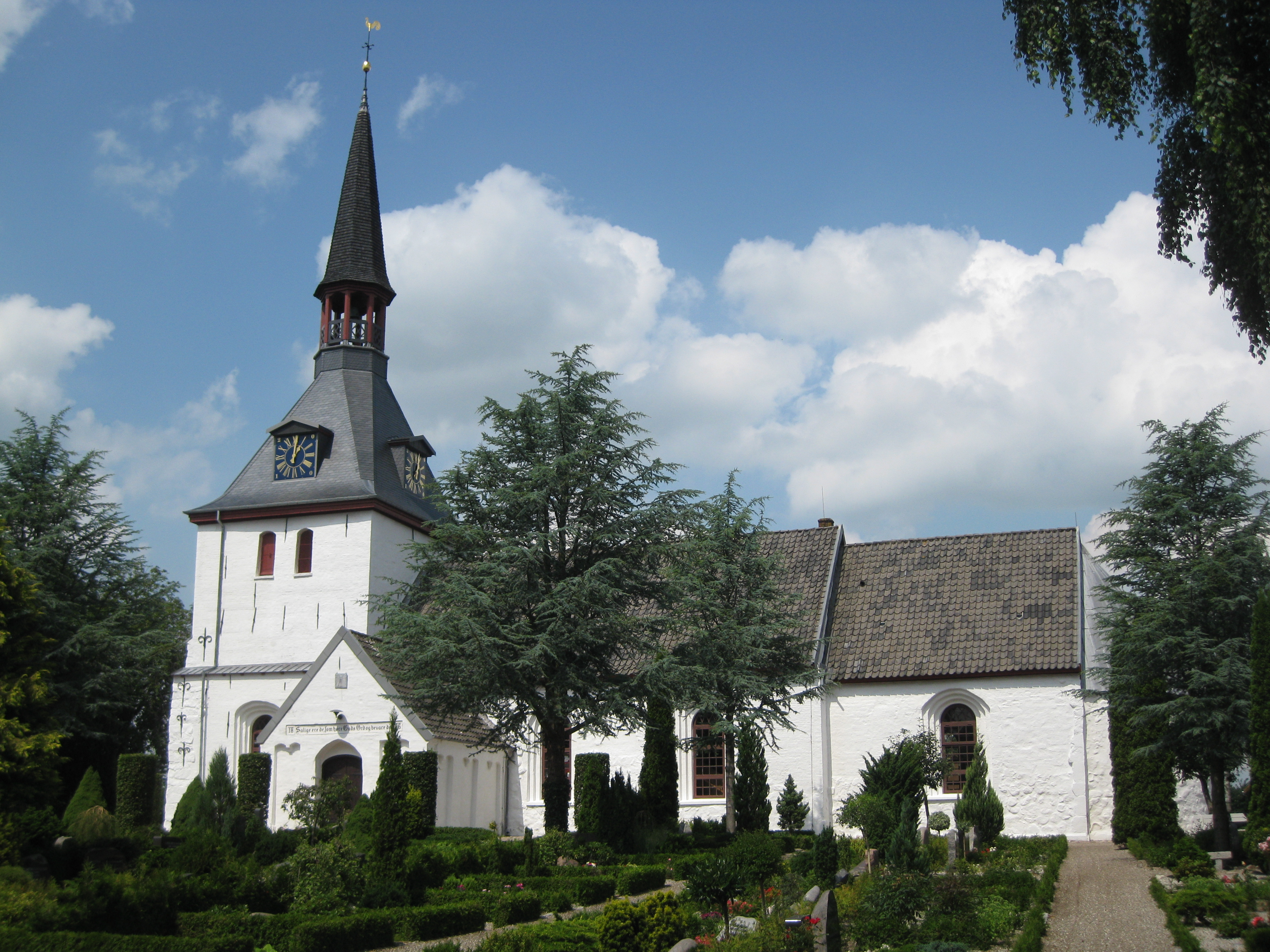
- Tinglev Church

- The parish within Aabenraa Municipality
- Country: Denmark
- Region: Southern Denmark
- Municipality: Aabenraa Municipality
- Diocese: Haderslev

Population (2025)
  - Total: 3,490
- Parish number: 9061

Tinglev Parish (Danish: Tinglev Sogn) is a parish in the Diocese of Haderslev in Aabenraa Municipality, Denmark.
