= Uge Parish =

Parish in Aabenraa Municipality, Denmark

Uge Parish Uge Sogn
- Parish
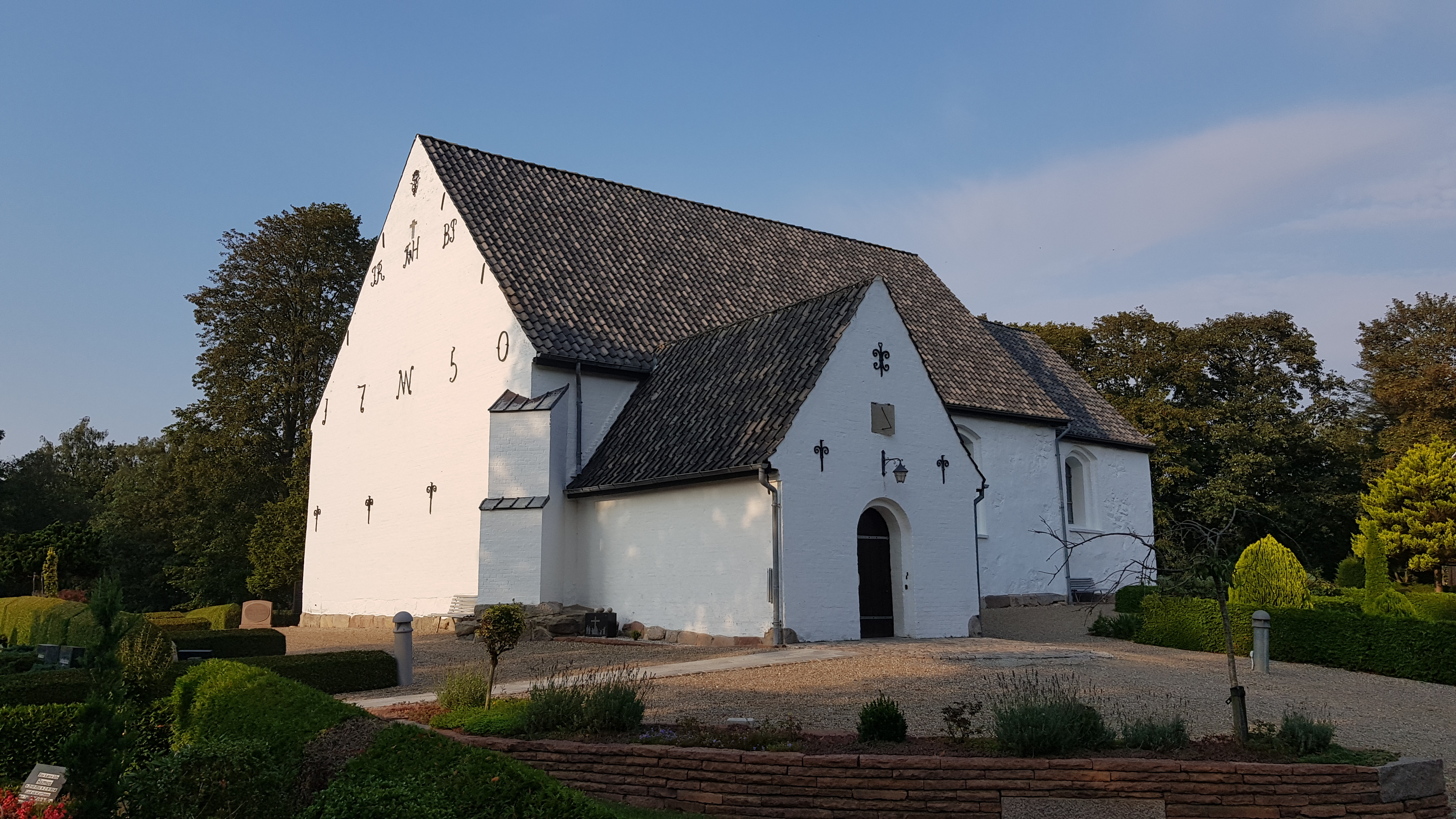
- Uge Church

- The parish within Aabenraa Municipality
- Country: Denmark
- Region: Southern Denmark
- Municipality: Aabenraa Municipality
- Diocese: Haderslev

Population (2025)
  - Total: 471
- Parish number: 9026

Uge Parish (Danish: Uge Sogn) is a parish in the Diocese of Haderslev in Aabenraa Municipality, Denmark.
