= Marianne Christiansen =

The Right Reverend Marianne Christiansen
- Bishop of Haderslev
- Church: Church of Denmark
- Diocese: Haderslev
- Elected: 2013
- Predecessor: Niels Henrik Arendt

Orders
- Consecration: 12 May 2012

Personal details
- Born: June 18, 1963 (age 63) Haslev, Denmark
- Denomination: Lutheran
- Children: 6
- Education: Aarhus University

Marianne Christiansen (born June 18, 1963 in Haslev) is a Lutheran bishop in the Church of Denmark.

== Life ==
Marianne Christiansen is the daughter of Bishop Henrik Christiansen and Sister of Helle Christiansen, Head of the Church of the Cross in Denmark. Christiansen gained a Candidate of Philosophy in music in 1989 and in science in 1992, both from Aarhus University. From 1986 to 1991, together with former member of parliament of the Radical Left Henrik Svane, she served as a principal at the Music and Theater College in Toftlund, and from 1993 the parish priest of Skørping-Fræer. In 1996 she became a lecturer at the Pastoral College in Aarhus specialising in Psalm knowledge and worship studies. From 2004 to 2005, Marianne Christiansen was an associate professor of preschool education with a special focus on continuing education. Between 2005 and 2011 she was parish priest of Thisted, and from 2011 to 2013 of Løgumkloster.

Marianne Christiansen is co-author of several books on liturgy and hymnology, as well as having extensive lectures. From 2004 to 2007 she was chairman of the Danish People's Mission, and since 2007 she has been president of the Folkekirke Youth Choir.

Marianne Christiansen was elected bishop with 691 votes, against Peter Hedegaard's 460 votes. Marianne Christiansen is Denmark's fourth female bishop. She has six children.
