= Morck =

Morck is a surname. Notable people with the surname include:

- Fredrikke Mørck (1861–1934), Norwegian feminist, editor and teacher
- Martin Mörck (born 1955), Norwegian artist
- Niels-Peter Mørck (born 1990), Danish football player
- Olof Mörck (born 1981), Swedish guitarist and songwriters
- Sidsel Mørck (born 1937), Norwegian poet and novelist

Fictional characters with the surname include:

- Carl Mørck, protagonist of the Department Q Nordic noir crime novels
