= Kliplev =

Kliplev Klipleff (German)
- Railway town
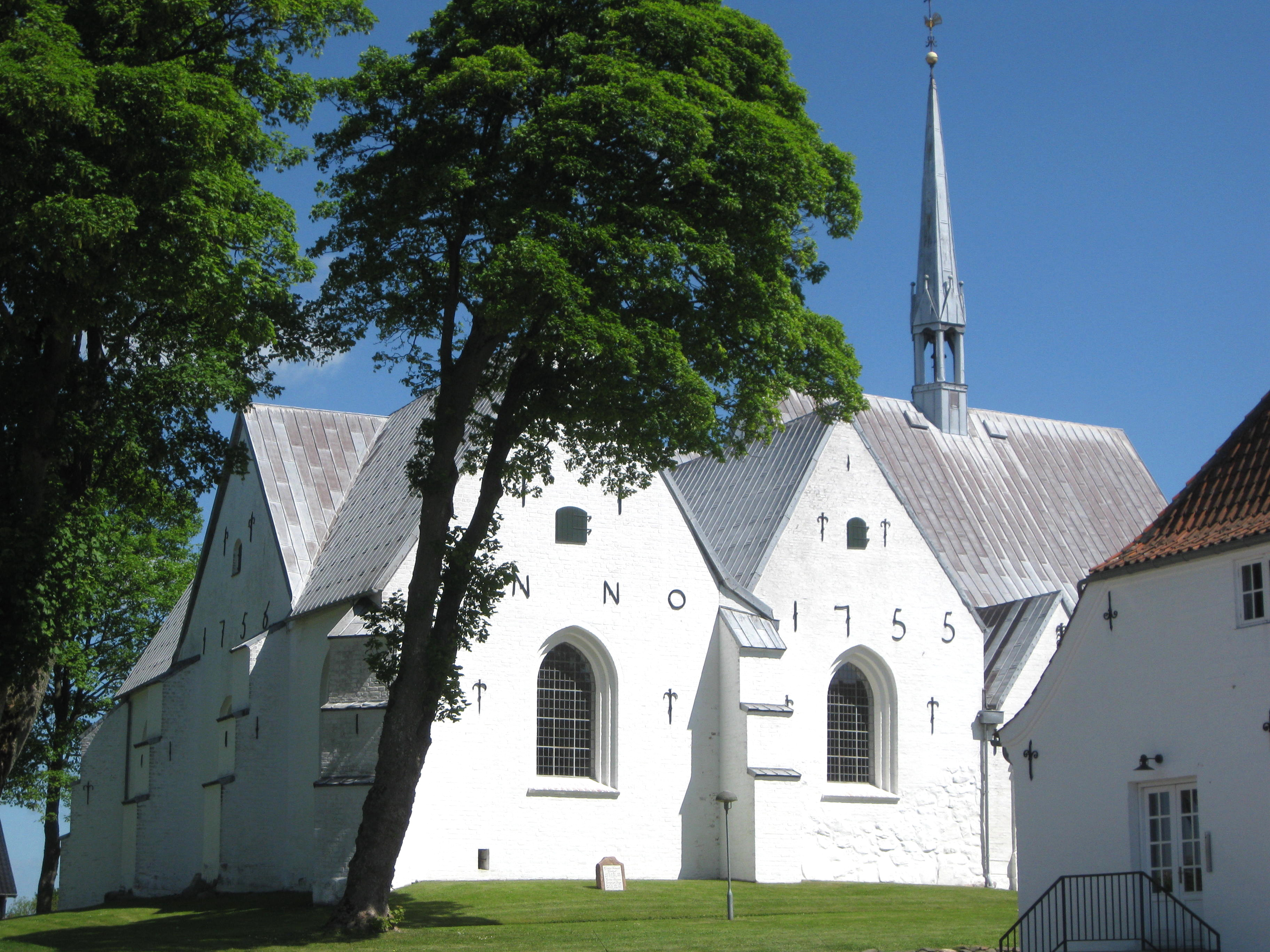
- Kliplev Church

- Location in Denmark Kliplev (Region of Southern Denmark)
- Coordinates: 54°56′12″N 9°24′1″E
- Country: Denmark
- Region: Southern Denmark
- Municipality: Aabenraa Municipality

Area
  - Urban: 1.1 km^{2} (0.42 sq mi)

Population (2026)
  - Urban: 1,235
  - Urban density: 1,100/km^{2} (2,900/sq mi)
- Time zone: UTC+1 (CET)
  - Summer (DST): UTC+2 (CEST)
- Postal code: DK-6200 Aabenraa

Kliplev (German: Klipleff) is a small railway town in Kliplev Parish in Aabenraa Municipality in Southern Jutland, Denmark. It is located 15 kilometres (9.3 mi) south of Aabenraa and 15 kilometres (9.3 mi) north of Padborg. As of 1 January 2026, Kliplev has a population of 1,235.

Kliplev is located at the Tinglev–Sønderborg railway line and is served by Kliplev railway station. It is located close to the European route E45 motorway.
