= Barsø =

Barsø Island
- Island
- Barsø island (left) is south of Haderslev, east of Aabenraa & north of Sønderborg.
- Coordinates: 55°7′0″N 9°34′0″E
- Country: Denmark
- Municipality: Aabenraa municipality

Area
  - Total: 2.5 km^{2} (0.97 sq mi)

Population (2013)
  - Total: 22
  - Density: 8.8/km^{2} (23/sq mi)
- Time zone: UTC+1 (CET)
  - Summer (DST): UTC+2 (CEST)
- Postal codes

Barsø is a small populated island which is part of the Aabenraa municipality (Danish, kommune) in South Jutland County on the east coast of the Jutland peninsula in south Denmark. It has a car ferry connection to the mainland.

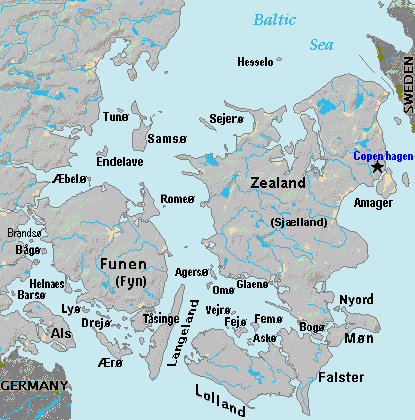
Barsø island (lower left) is northwest of Als island, west of Helnæs and Funen island.

== See also ==
- Nearby islands: Als, Funen, Bågø, Lyø, Drejø.
- Nearby cities: Aabenraa, Sønderborg.
