= South Jutland County =

Former county in Denmark

Coordinates: 55°02′40″N 9°24′52″E

South Jutland County Sønderjyllands Amt (Danish) Northern Schleswig Nordslesvig (Danish) Nordschleswig (German)
- Amt
- Coat of arms

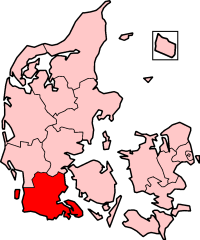
- South Jutland County in Denmark
- Established: 1 April 1970
- Abolished: 1 January 2007
- County seat: Aabenraa
- Municipalities: 24: Aabenraa; Augustenborg; Bredebro; Broager; Bov; Fanø; Christiansfeld; Gram; Gråsten; Haderslev; Højer; Lundtoft; Løgumkloster; Nordborg; Nørre-Rangstrup; Rødding; Rødekro; Skærbæk; Sundeved; Sønderborg; Sydals; Tinglev; Tønder; Vojens

Area
  - Total: 3,938 km^{2} (1,520 sq mi)

Population (2006)
  - Total: 252,433
  - Density: 64.10/km^{2} (166.0/sq mi)
- Time zone: UTC+1 (CET)
  - Summer (DST): UTC+2 (CEST)
- IM amt: 1050
- ISO 3166 code: 3166-1
- Successor: Region of Southern Denmark

South Jutland County (Danish: Sønderjyllands Amt) is a former county (Danish: amt) on the south-central portion of the Jutland Peninsula in southern Denmark.

The county was formed on 1 April 1970, comprising the former counties of Aabenraa (E), Haderslev (N), Sønderborg (SE), and Tønder (SW). The county was abolished effective 1 January 2007, when the Region of Southern Denmark was formed.

Following the reunification of the region with Denmark, the Church of Denmark elevated Haderslev to a diocese in 1923 and divided the region between the dioceses of Ribe (W) and Haderslev (E). This arrangement remains in effect.

== History ==
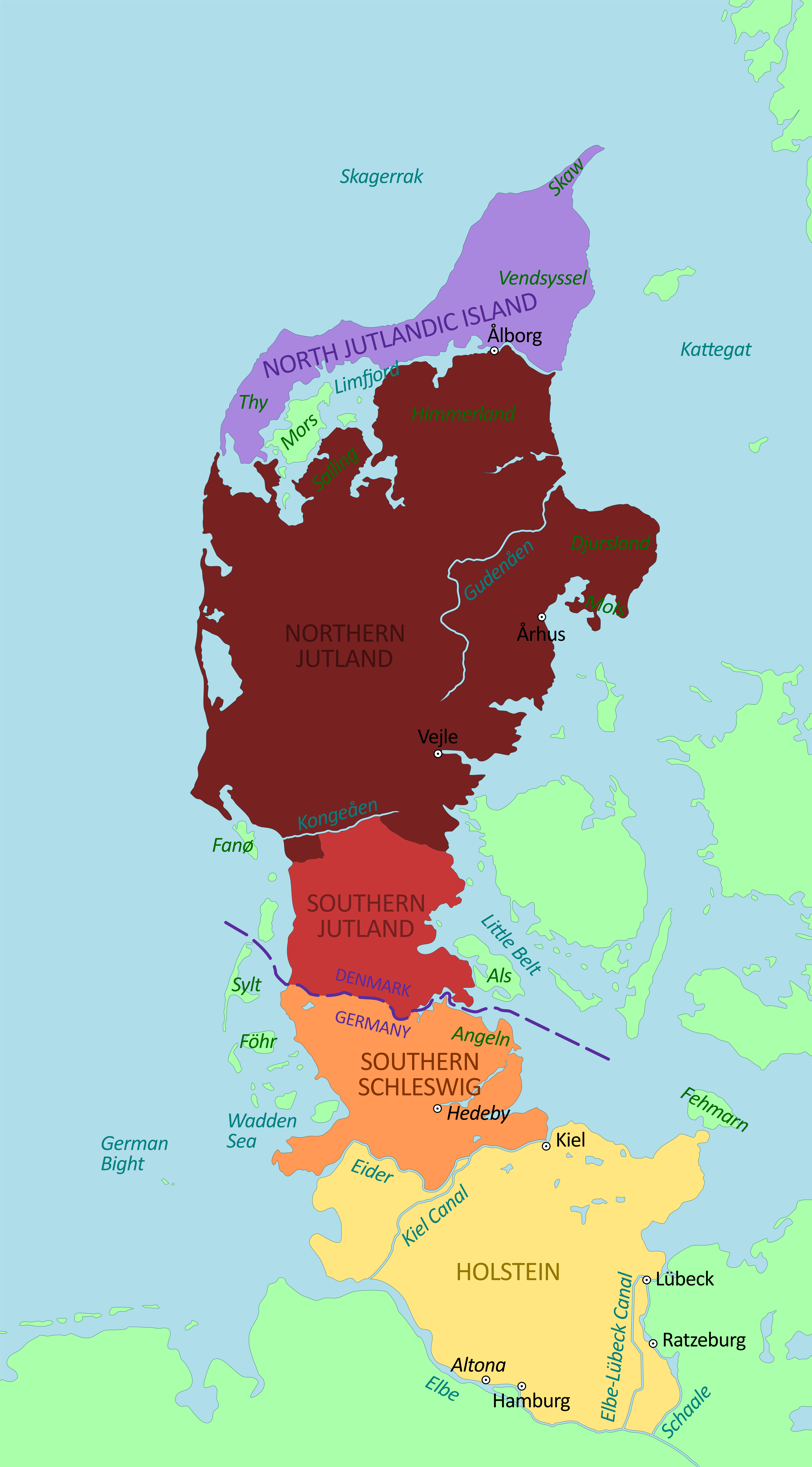
Schleswig and Holstein on the Jutland Peninsula

South Jutland county is also known as Northern Schleswig (Danish: Nordslesvig, German: Nordschleswig). The name refers specifically to the southernmost 50 kilometers (31 mi) of the Danish part of the Jutland Peninsula that formerly belonged to the former Duchy of Schleswig (Danish: Slesvig or Sønderjylland), a Danish fief under the Kings of Denmark.

Denmark lost the Duchy of Schleswig, as well as the German Duchies of Holstein and Lauenburg, to Prussia and Austria in 1864 in the Second Schleswig War. Following Austria's defeat in the Austro-Prussian War in 1866, all three provinces were annexed to Prussia.

After the October Revolution in Russia, Workers' and Soldiers' Councils were organized all over Germany following the example of soviets in revolutionary Russia. South Jutland was part of Germany until 1920 and such councils were established in several towns. In most places there was very little unrest or revolutionary activities and the councils helped to maintain calm and order.

Following the defeat of Germany in World War I, the Allied powers organised two plebiscites in Northern and Central Schleswig on 10 February and 14 March 1920, respectively. In Northern Schleswig 75% voted for reunification with Denmark and 25% for remaining in Germany. Though there is no historical census, it is estimated that the percentage of ethnic Germans in Northern Schleswig was less than the 25% that had voted for remaining in Germany. From 1920 to 1939, Johannes Schmidt-Vodder was elected as the sole ethnic German representative in the Danish Parliament with consistently 13 to 15% of the North Schleswig votes, providing an indication of the actual percentage of ethnic Germans in the region.

In Central Schleswig the situation was reversed with 80% voting for Germany and 20% for Denmark. No vote ever took place in the southern third of Schleswig, as the result was considered a foregone conclusion. Today, they both form a part of the German state of Schleswig-Holstein.

On 15 June 1920, Northern Schleswig was officially reunited with Denmark. It is the only one of the transfers of German territory after World War I that the Nazis did not dispute. A small ethnic German minority still lives in South Jutland county, predominantly in and near the towns of Tønder and Aabenraa (German: Tondern and Apenrade). A relatively larger Dane minority lives in the German state of Schleswig-Holstein.

=== 1970 borders ===
As reconstituted in 1970, South Jutland County had slightly different borders to the area gained from Germany in 1920: the towns of Hejle, Taps and Vejstrup (which were Danish throughout the period 1864 to 1920) were included in its jurisdiction, whereas Spandet, Roager and Hviding (German from 1864 to 1920) were included in the neighbouring 1970–2006 county of Ribe.

== Insignia ==
The coat of arms of South Jutland County was designed in 1980 and is derived from the historic coat of arms of Schleswig which in turn is derived from the national coat of arms of Denmark. The inspiration for the Dannebrog pennant was a 13th-century seal used by Erik Abelsøn, Duke of Schleswig.

== List of county mayors ==
From	To	County Mayor
1 April 1970	2 December 1981	Erik Jessen (Venstre)
2 December 1981	1 July 2000	Kresten Philipsen (Venstre)
1 July 2000	31 December 2006	Carl Holst (Venstre)

== Municipalities (1970–2006) ==
- Aabenraa municipality
- Augustenborg municipality
- Bredebro municipality
- Broager municipality
- Bov municipality
- Christiansfeld municipality
- Gram municipality
- Gråsten municipality
- Haderslev municipality
- Højer municipality
- Lundtoft municipality
- Løgumkloster municipality
- Nordborg municipality
- Nørre-Rangstrup municipality
- Rødding municipality
- Rødekro municipality
- Skærbæk municipality
- Sundeved municipality
- Sønderborg municipality
- Sydals municipality
- Tinglev municipality
- Tønder municipality
- Vojens municipality
