= Felsted Parish =

Parish in Aabenraa Municipality, Denmark

Felsted Parish Felsted Sogn
- Parish
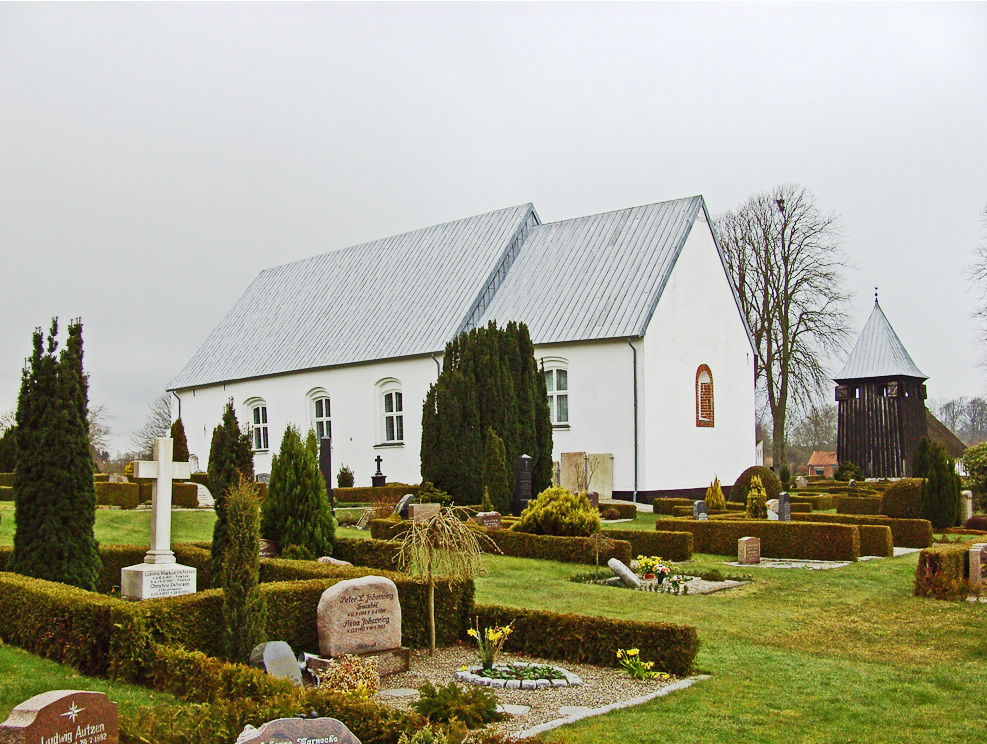
- Felsted Church

- The parish within Aabenraa Municipality
- Country: Denmark
- Region: Southern Denmark
- Municipality: Aabenraa Municipality
- Diocese: Haderslev

Population (2025)
  - Total: 2,238
- Parish number: 9023

Felsted Parish (Danish: Felsted Sogn) is a parish in the Diocese of Haderslev in Aabenraa Municipality, Denmark.
