= Sønderborg County =

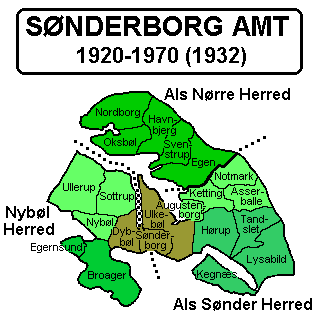
Sønderborg County. The entire province became part of South Jutland County in 1970.

Sønderborg County (Danish: Sønderborg Amt) is a former province in Denmark, located on the island of Als and the easternmost part of Southern Jutland. As of 2017 its population was 27,000.

== History ==
Sønderborg was first established in 1256. After Denmark surrendered control over Schleswig to Prussia and the Austrian Empire in 1864, the Schleswig island of Ærø was transferred from Augustenborg County to Svendborg County and the island remained Danish. The rest of Augustenborg County was merged with Sønderborg and became Kreis Sonderburg. Sønderborg County and Aabenraa County merged in 1932, forming Aabenraa-Sønderborg County.

Sønderborg County was reestablished in 1920 following the reunification of Denmark and South Jutland following the Schleswig Plebiscites. It was dissolved in 1970 when it merged with three other counties to form South Jutland County. Sønderborg County corresponded geographically to the former Prussian Kreis Sonderburg.

== 1970 administrative reform ==
Aabenraa-Sønderborg County was dissolved in the 1970 administrative reform and the former county became six new municipalities belonging to South Jutland County:

- Augustenborg
- Broager
- Nordborg
- Sundeved
- Sydals
- Sønderborg

== List of former hundreds (herreder) ==
The country is consisted of the following hundreds:

- Als Nørre Herred
- Als Sønder Herred
- Nybøl Herred

== See also ==
- Sønderborg Municipality
