= Burkal Parish =

Parish in Aabenraa Municipality, Denmark

Burkal Parish Burkal Sogn
- Parish
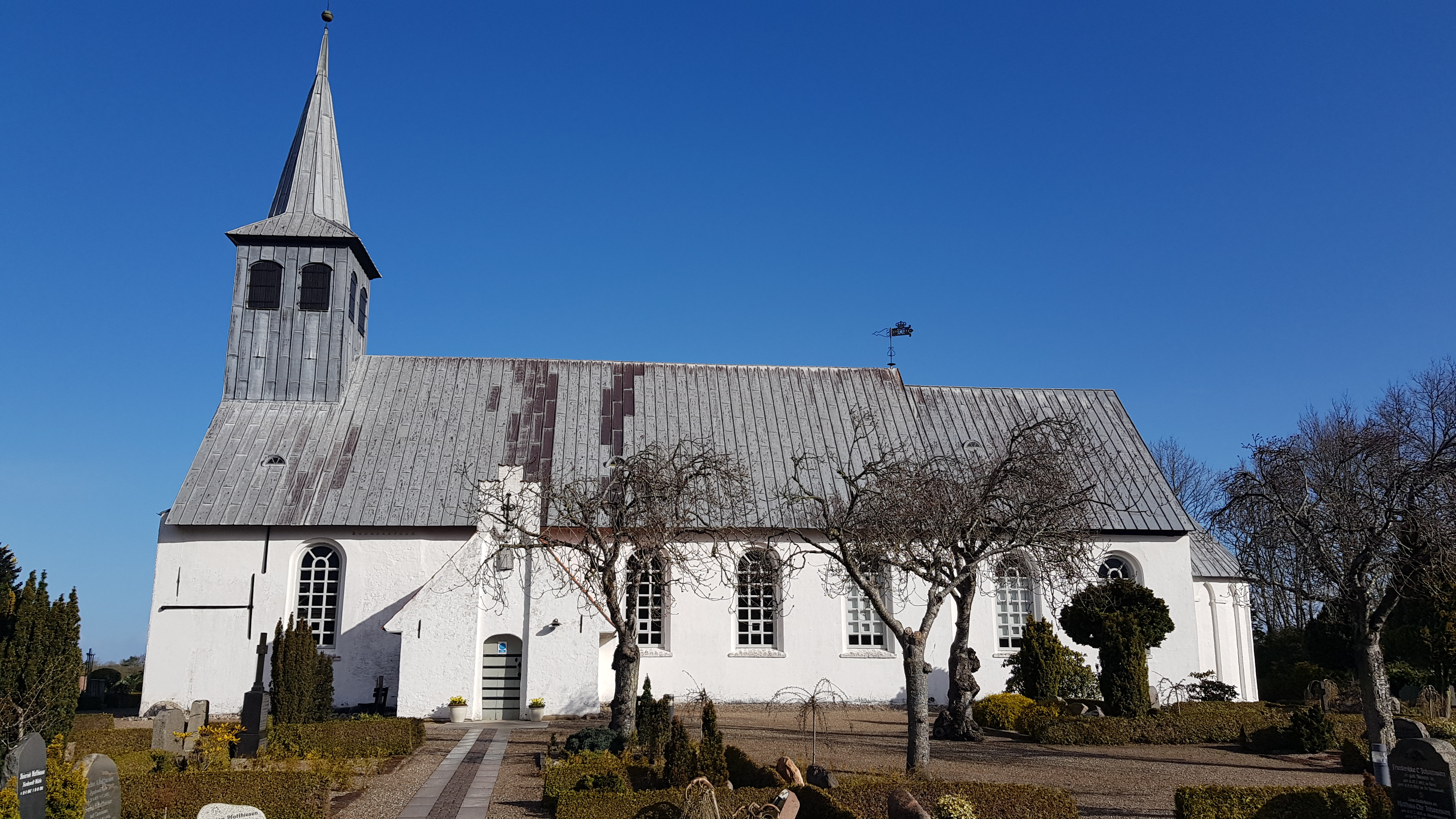
- Burkal Church

- The parish within Aabenraa Municipality
- Country: Denmark
- Region: Southern Denmark
- Municipality: Aabenraa Municipality
- Diocese: Haderslev

Population (2025)
  - Total: 1,616
- Parish number: 9056

Burkal Parish (Danish: Burkal Sogn) is a parish in the Diocese of Haderslev in Aabenraa Municipality, Denmark.
