= Ravsted Parish =

Parish in Aabenraa Municipality, Denmark

Ravsted Parish Ravsted Sogn
- Parish
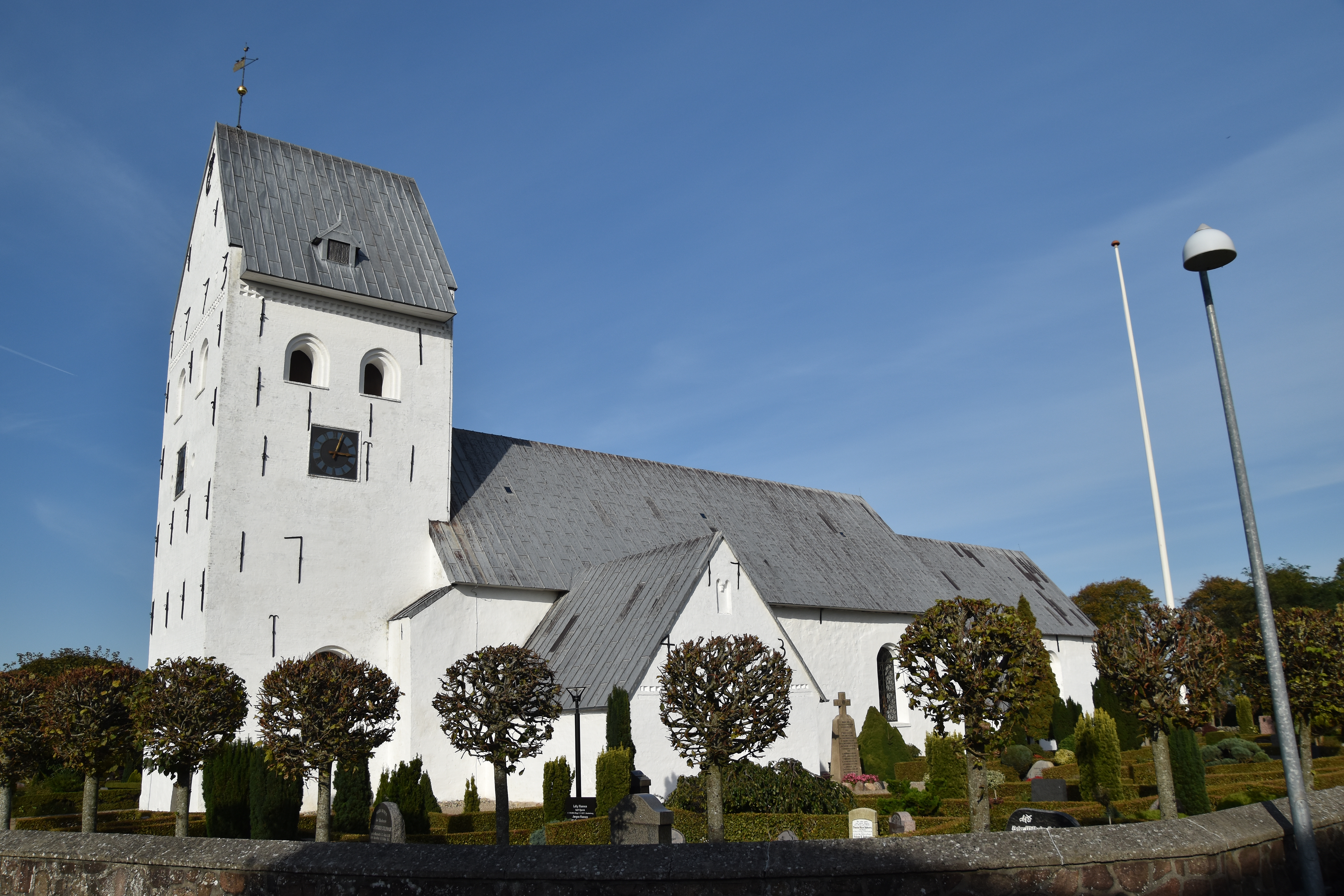
- Ravsted Church

- The parish within Aabenraa Municipality
- Country: Denmark
- Region: Southern Denmark
- Municipality: Aabenraa Municipality
- Diocese: Haderslev

Population (2025)
  - Total: 903
- Parish number: 9060

Ravsted Parish (Danish: Ravsted Sogn) is a parish in the Diocese of Haderslev in Aabenraa Municipality, Denmark.
