= Niels-Peter Mørck =

Danish footballer (born 1990)

Personal information
- Full name: Niels-Peter Wilhelm Mørck
- Date of birth: 28 April 1990 (age 36)
- Place of birth: Padborg, Denmark
- Height: 1.85 m (6 ft 1 in)
- Position: Midfielder

Team information
- Current team: Virtus Bolzano

Youth career
- Flensburg 08
- Aabenraa BK
- –2005: SUB Sønderborg
- 2005–2009: Esbjerg fB

Senior career*
Years	Team	Apps	(Gls)
2009–2010	Esbjerg fB	2	(0)
2010–2012	Varde IF		
2012–2014	VfB Germania Halberstadt	50	(3)
2015–2017	WSG Wattens	50	(13)
2017–	Virtus Bolzano	?	(?)
- * Club domestic league appearances and goals as of 25 August 2017

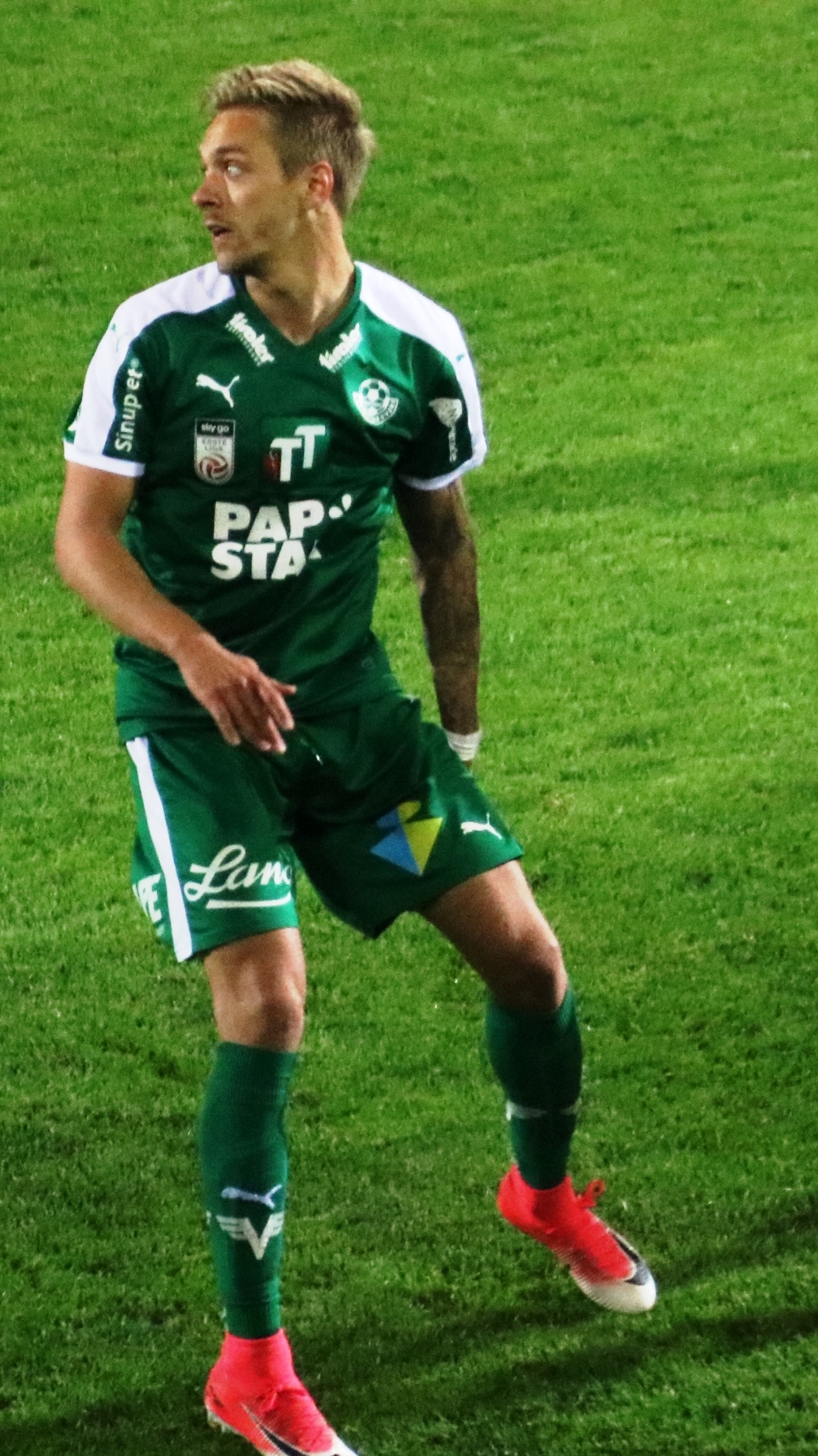
Niels-Peter Mørck at an Austrian 2nd league game

Niels-Peter Mørck (born 28 April 1990) is a Danish football midfielder who plays for Italian club Virtus Bolzano.
