= Bylderup Parish =

Parish in Aabenraa Municipality, Denmark

Bylderup Parish Bylderup Sogn
- Parish
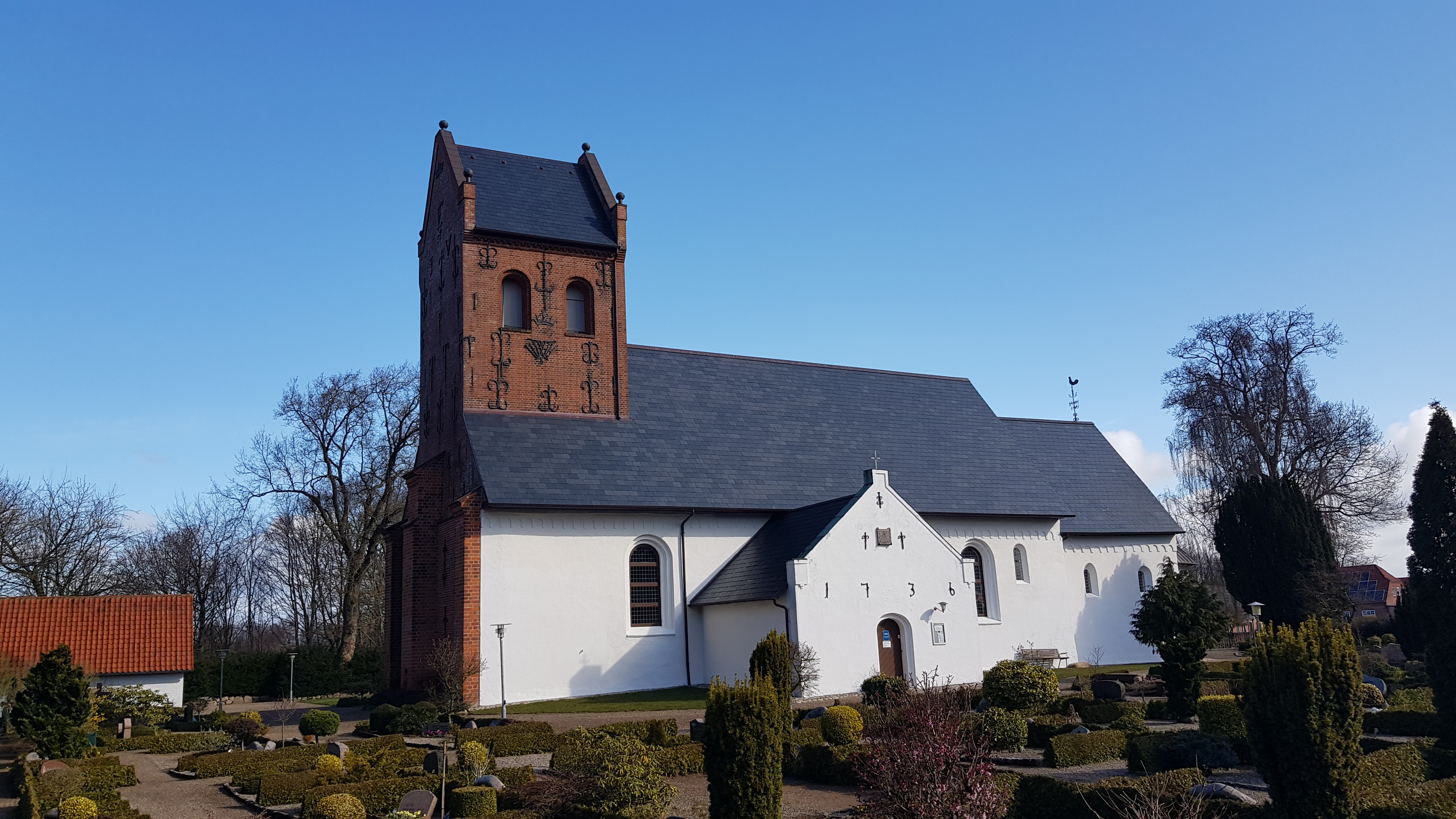
- Bylderup Church

- The parish within Aabenraa Municipality
- Country: Denmark
- Region: Southern Denmark
- Municipality: Aabenraa Municipality
- Diocese: Haderslev

Population (2025)
  - Total: 897
- Parish number: 9057

Bylderup Parish (Danish: Bylderup Sogn) is a parish in the Diocese of Haderslev in Aabenraa Municipality, Denmark.
