= Kruså =

- Town
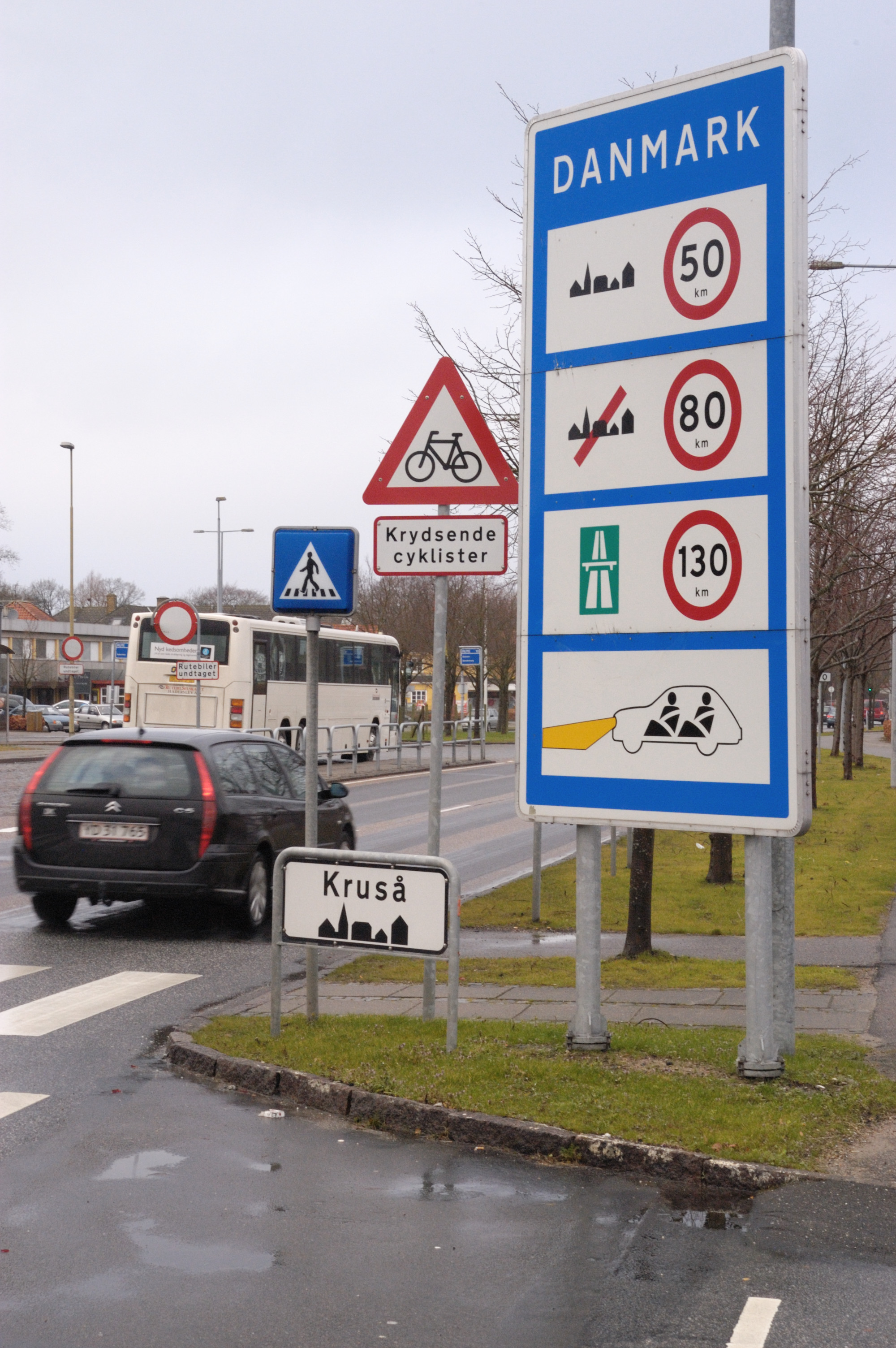
- German-Danish border at Kruså

- Location in Region of Southern Denmark Kruså (Denmark)
- Coordinates: 54°50′44″N 9°23′55″E
- Country: Denmark
- Region: Southern Denmark
- Municipality: Aabenraa Municipality

Area
  - Urban: 1.5 km^{2} (0.58 sq mi)

Population (2026)
  - Urban: 1,528
  - Urban density: 1,000/km^{2} (2,600/sq mi)
- Time zone: UTC+1 (CET)
  - Summer (DST): UTC+2 (CEST)
- Postal code: DK-6340 Kruså

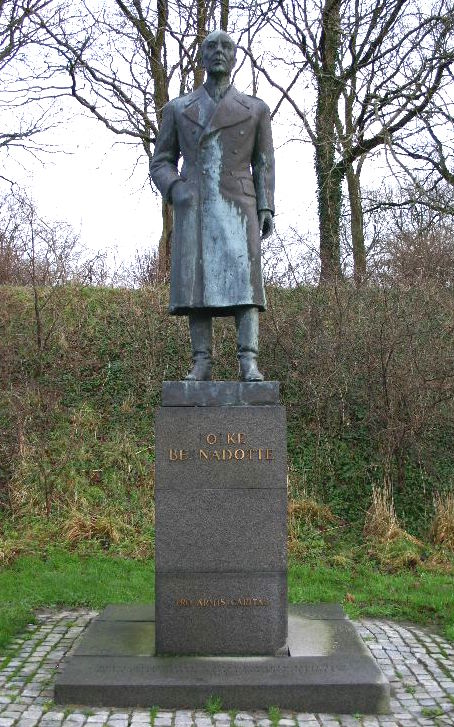
The Folke Bernadotte memorial statue in Kruså

Kruså (Danish pronunciation: [kʰʁuˈsɔˀ]; German: Krusau) is a Danish border town and border crossing with a population of 1,528 (1 January 2026), 6 kilometers north of Flensburg, situated on the European route E45. It is located in Aabenraa Municipality (prior to the Municipality Reform of 2007 in Bov municipality).

On 9 April 1940, at 4:15 am German troops crossed the border here, starting the invasion of Denmark.

Until the opening of the motorway border crossing at Frøslev Kruså was the most important crossing over land to Germany.
