= Kliplev Parish =

Parish in Aabenraa Municipality, Denmark

Kliplev Parish Kliplev Sogn
- Parish
- The parish within Aabenraa Municipality
- Country: Denmark
- Region: Southern Denmark
- Municipality: Aabenraa Municipality
- Diocese: Haderslev

Population (2025)
  - Total: 2,204
- Parish number: 9027

Kliplev Parish (Danish: Kliplev Sogn) is a parish in the Diocese of Haderslev in Aabenraa Municipality, Denmark.
