= Bov Municipality =

Former municipality of Denmark

Coordinates: 54°49′N 9°22′E

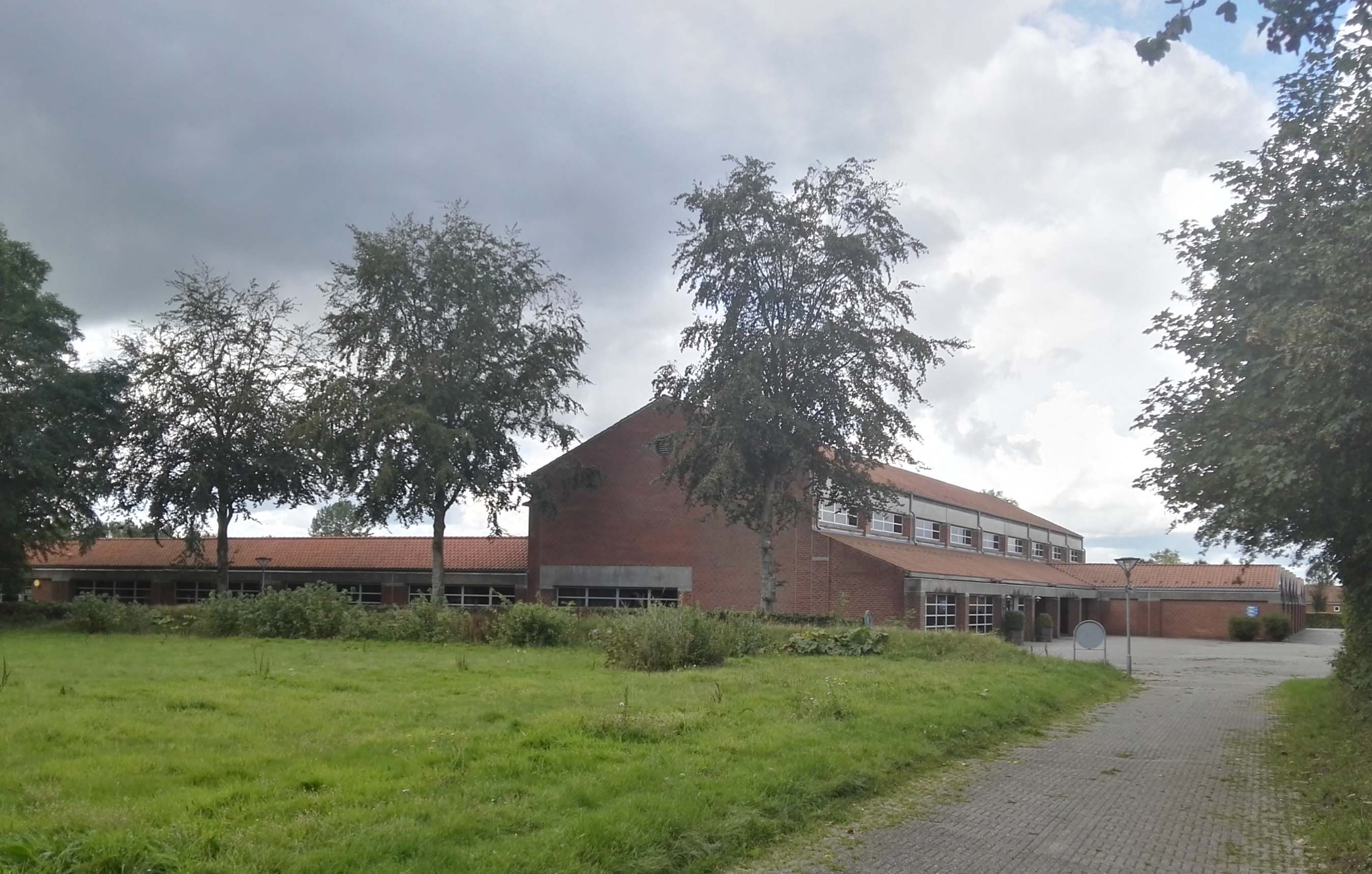
Bov Municipality's town hall at Kirkestien 1 in Padborg

Until 1 January 2007, Bov municipality (Danish pronunciation: [ˈpɔwˀ]; German: Bau) was a municipality (Danish, kommune) in South Jutland County on the Jutland peninsula in south Denmark. The municipality covered an area of 148 km^{2}, and had a total population of 9,992 (2005). Its last mayor was Jens Aage Helmig, a member of the Venstre (Liberal Party) political party. The main town and the site of its municipal council was the town of Padborg.

== History ==
The municipality was created in 1970 due to a kommunalreform ("Municipality Reform") that combined Bov and Holbøl Parish.

Bov municipality ceased to exist as the result of Kommunalreformen ("The Municipality Reform" of 2007). It was merged with former Lundtoft, Rødekro, Tinglev, and Aabenraa municipalities to form the new Aabenraa municipality. This created a municipality with an area of 951 km^{2} and a total population of 60,151 (2005). The new municipality belongs to the new Region of Southern Denmark.
