= Niels Henrik Arendt =

Danish bishop (1950-2015)

Niels Henrik Arendt (23 September 1950 – 24 August 2015) was a Church of Denmark prelate and the bishop of Haderslev from 1999 to 2013. Before he became bishop, he was the parish priest in Naur Pastorat from 1975 to 1992 and the dean in Haderslev Cathedral from 1992 to 1999. He died at the Arendt vicar of Madum, in the Jutland peninsula.
