= Padborg =

Padborg Pattburg (German)
- Town
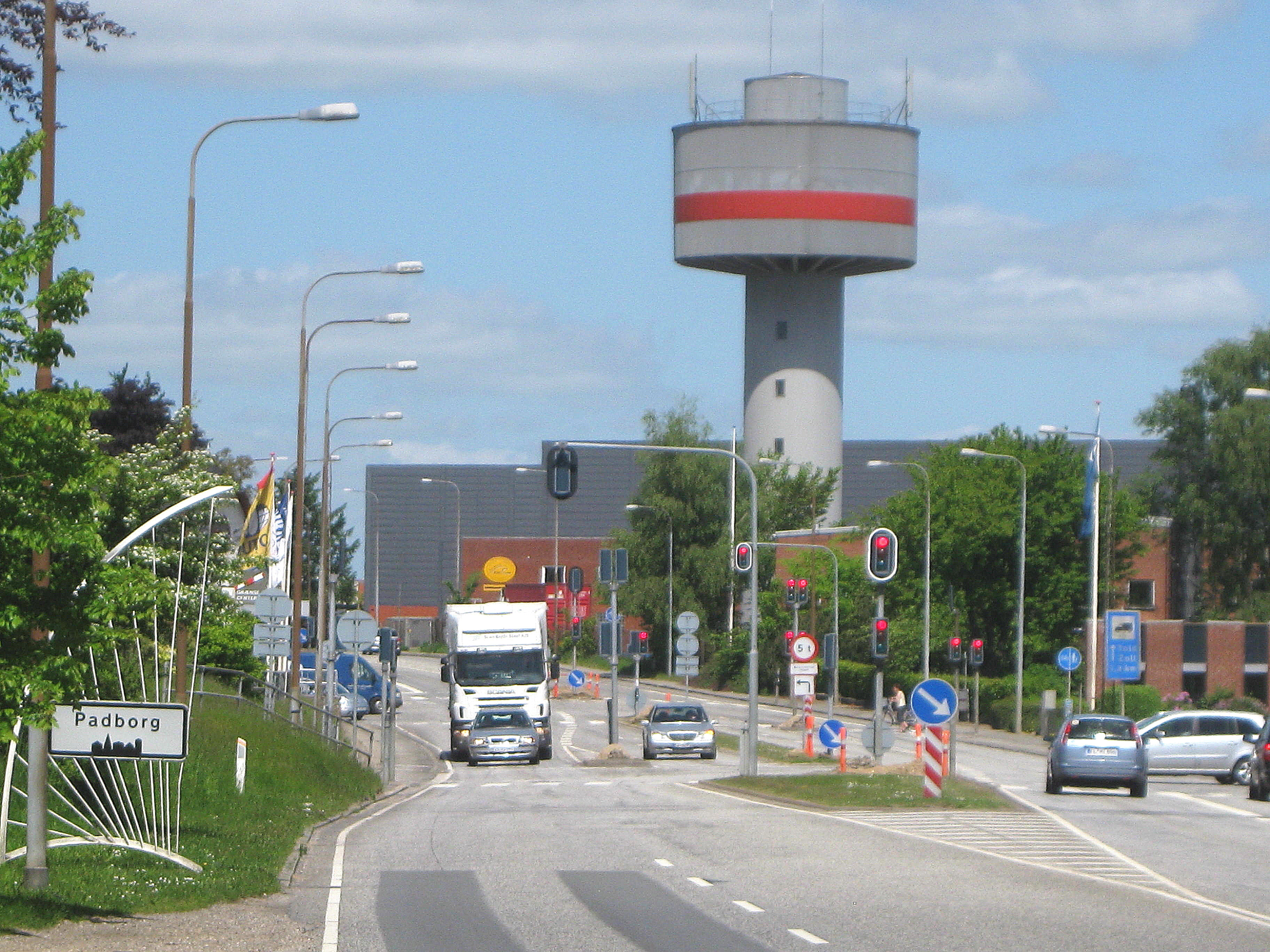
- The watertower in Padborg

- Location in Denmark Padborg (Region of Southern Denmark)
- Coordinates: 54°49′17″N 9°21′27″E
- Country: Denmark
- Region: Southern Denmark
- Municipality: Aabenraa Municipality

Area
  - Urban: 6.3 km^{2} (2.4 sq mi)

Population (2026)
  - Urban: 4,263
  - Urban density: 680/km^{2} (1,800/sq mi)
  - Gender: 2,147 males and 2,116 females
- Time zone: UTC+1 (CET)
  - Summer (DST): UTC+2 (CEST)
- Postal code: DK-6330 Padborg

Padborg (German: Pattburg) is a southern Danish border town with a population of 4,263 (1 January 2026) located on the border with Germany. It is the location where both the E45 motorway, a railway and the historic Danish Army Road, hærvejen, cross the border.

Located a few kilometres northwest of Schleswig's historic commercial centre, Flensburg, Padborg was a small settlement when the region returned to Danish rule in 1920 following a plebiscite, but grew rapidly in size after the establishment of the current border. It is a transport centre and railway town. When the border was established in 1920, the originally planned border line was moved c. 200 metres south of Padborg in order to allow construction of the railway station and a customs office. Padborg is well known in Denmark for its motorsport ring, Padborg Park, and the head offices of the large discount chain Fleggaard.

Padborg has a broad based transport industry with most of the largest European transport companies having local offices. Padborg is located in Aabenraa municipality. Until 31 December 2006 it belonged to Bov municipality.

== Notable people ==
- Niels-Peter Mørck (born 1990 in Padborg) a Danish football midfielder who plays for Italian club Virtus Bolzano
