= Rødekro =

Rødekro Rothenkrug (German)
- Town
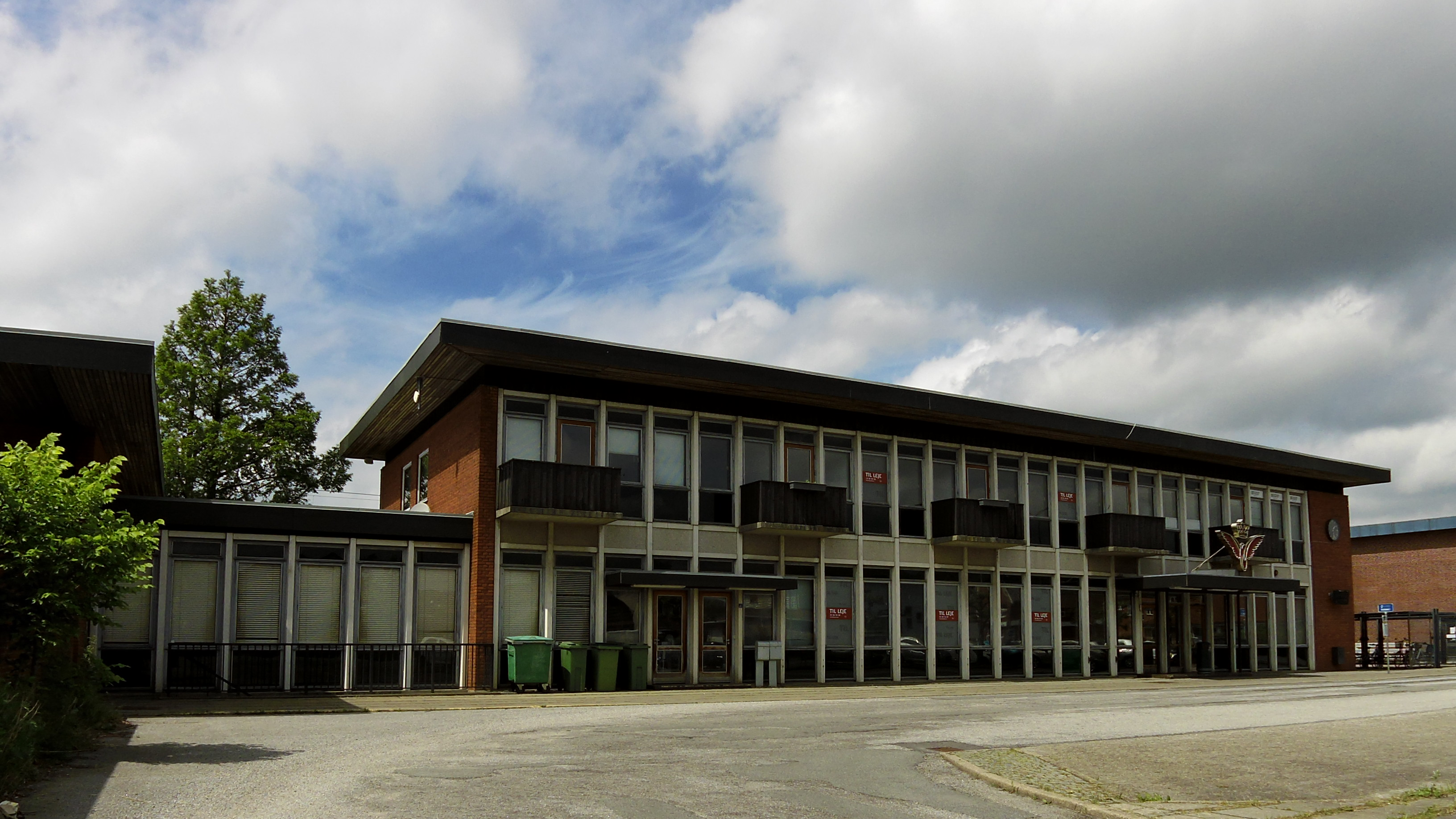
- Rødekro railway station

- Location in Denmark Rødekro (Region of Southern Denmark)
- Coordinates: 55°4′10″N 9°19′58″E
- Country: Denmark
- Region: Southern Denmark
- Municipality: Aabenraa Municipality
- Parish: Rise Parish

Area
  - Urban: 5.2 km^{2} (2.0 sq mi)

Population (2026)
  - Urban: 6,182
  - Urban density: 1,200/km^{2} (3,100/sq mi)
  - Gender: 2,976 males and 3,206 females
- Time zone: UTC+1 (CET)
  - Summer (DST): UTC+2 (CEST)
- Postal code: DK-6230 Rødekro

Rødekro (German: Rothenkrug) is a railway town, with a population of 6,182 (1 January 2026), in Aabenraa Municipality in Region of Southern Denmark on the Jutland peninsula in south Denmark. It is located 33 km north of the Denmark-Germany border, 37 km northeast of Tønder, 28 km southwest of Haderslev and 8 km northwest of Aabenraa.

Rødekro was the seat of the former Rødekro Municipality (Danish, kommune) until 1 January 2007.

The town is served by Rødekro station on the Fredericia–Padborg railway line.

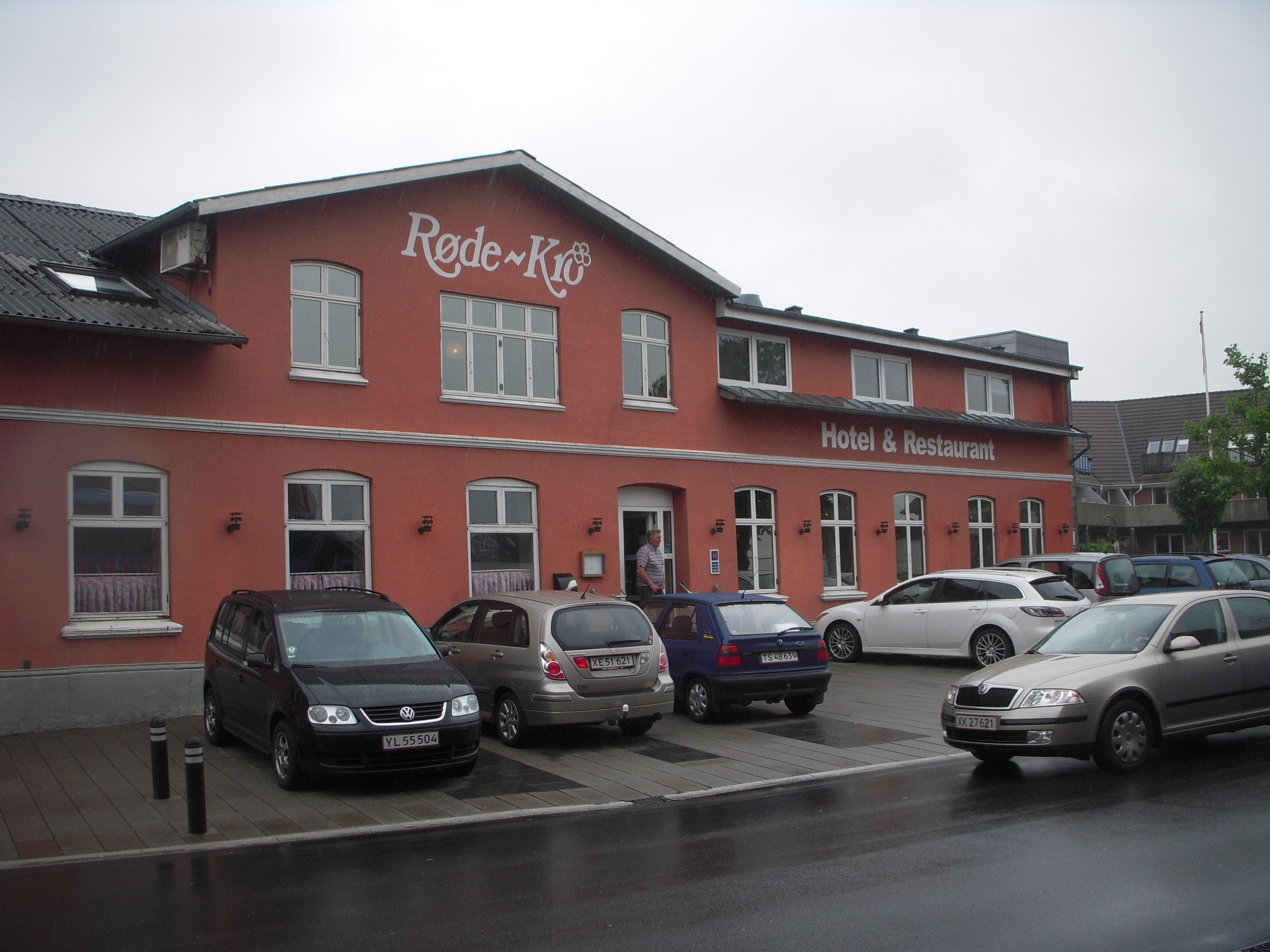
Hotel Røde-Kro & Restaurant

Hotel Røde-Kro is a hotel and inn located in the centre of the town just north of the railway station. The hotels history dates back to 1649 and it was this Inn who named the town (Rødekro means Red Inn in Danish).

== Rødekro Municipality ==
The former Rødekro municipality covered an area of 202 km^{2}, and had a total population of 11,695 (2005). Its last mayor was Tove Larsen, a member of the Social Democrats (Socialdemokraterne) political party.

The municipality was created in 1970 due to a kommunalreform ("Municipality Reform") that combined a number of existing parishes:

- Egvad Parish
- Hellevad Parish
- Hjordkær Parish
- Rise Parish
- Øster Løgum Parish

On 1 January 2007 Rødekro municipality ceased to exist as the result of Kommunalreformen ("The Municipality Reform" of 2007). It was merged with Bov, Lundtoft, Tinglev, and Aabenraa municipalities to form the new Aabenraa municipality. This created a municipality with an area of 951 km^{2} and a total population of 60,151 (2005). The new municipality belongs to Region of Southern Denmark ("South Denmark Region").

== Notable people ==
- Anette Hoffmann (born 1971 at Egvad) a former Danish team handball player, twice team gold medallist at the 1996 and 2000 Summer Olympics
- Mike Andersen (born 1977 in Rødekro) a Danish blues and soul songwriter, guitarist, singer and bandleader
- René Bach (born 1990 in Hjordkær, Rødekro) a motorcycle speedway rider, member of Denmark U-21 national team
- Lea Hansen (born 1999 in Rødekro) a Danish handball player who currently plays for Silkeborg-Voel KFUM
