= Aabenraa Municipality =

Aabenraa Municipality Aabenraa Kommune (Danish) Kommune Apenrade (German)
- Municipality
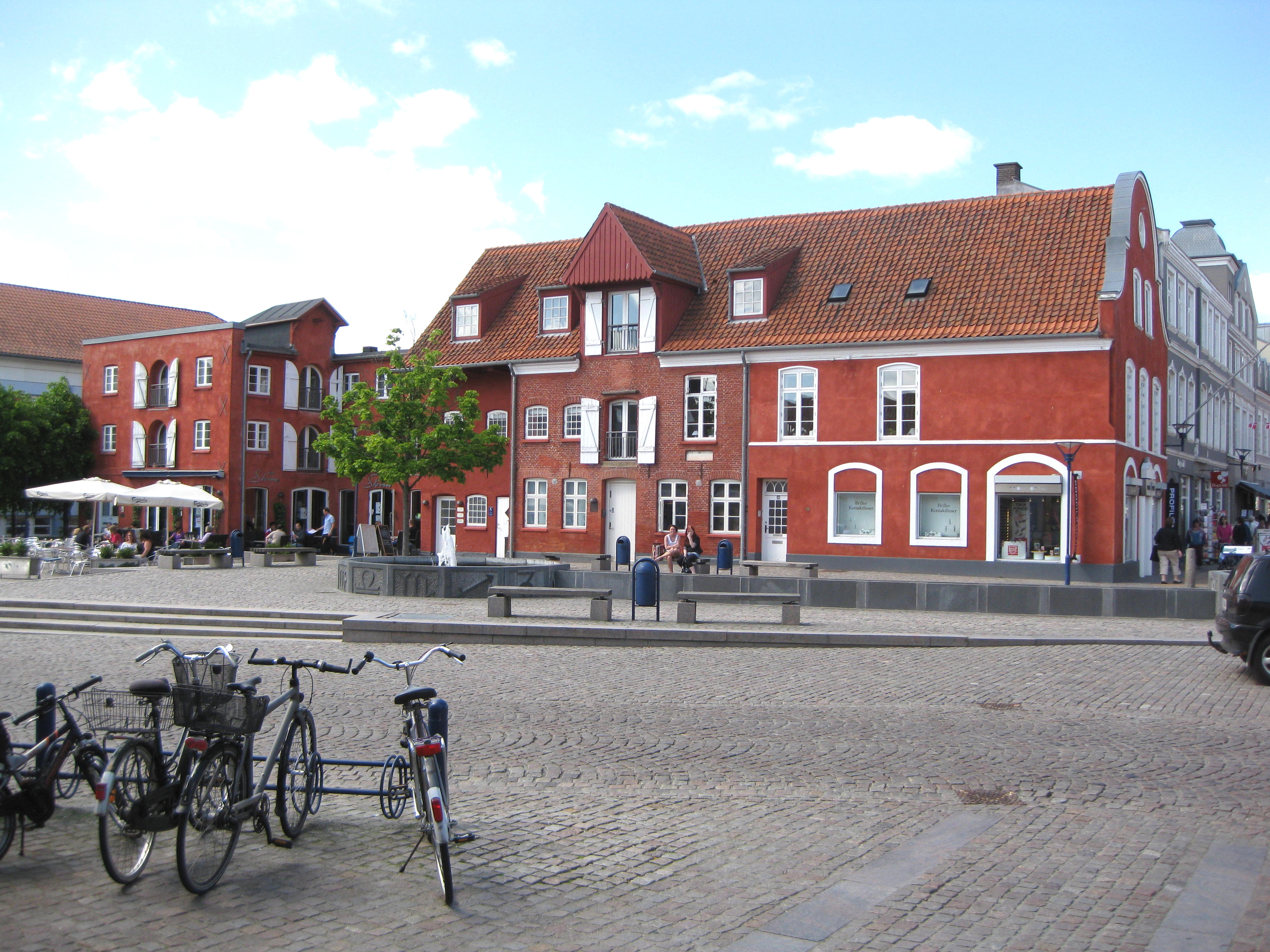

- Coat of arms

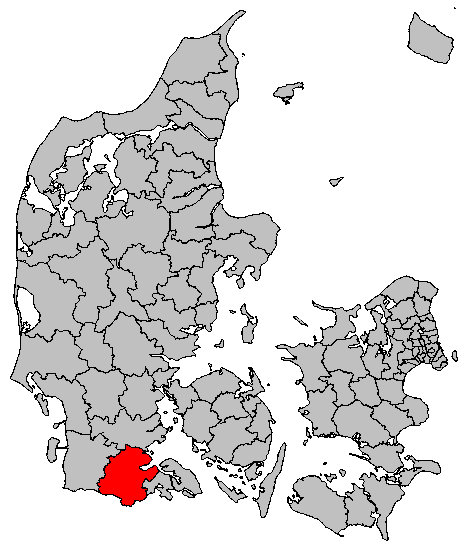
- Location in Denmark
- Coordinates: 55°01′59″N 9°25′01″E
- Country: Denmark
- Region: Southern Denmark
- Established: 1 January 2007

Government
  - Mayor: Jan Riber Jakobsen

Area
  - Total: 941 km^{2} (363 sq mi)

Population (1 January 2026)
  - Total: 58,405
  - Density: 62.1/km^{2} (161/sq mi)
- Time zone: UTC+1 (CET)
  - Summer (DST): UTC+2 (CEST)
- Postal code: 6200
- Website: www.aabenraa.dk

Aabenraa Municipality (Danish: Aabenraa Kommune, German: Kommune Apenrade) is a kommune in the Region of Southern Denmark in southwestern Denmark. The municipality has an area of 940.7 km^{2} and a total population of 58,405 (2026). Its largest town and the site of its municipal council is the city of Aabenraa. The mayor of the municipality is Jan Riber Jakobsen, representing the Conservative People's Party.

The island of Barsø is located in the northeast corner of the municipality in the Little Belt. Major communities include Lundsbjerg near the capital, Aabenraa; Søgård to the south, Felsted to the east, and Løjt Kirkeby to the north. Løjt Kirkeby is connected by ferry service from the island of Barsø.

== History ==
From 1864 to 1920, the region was part of Prussia, in the Province of Schleswig-Holstein, and as such part of the North German Confederation and, from 1871 onwards, part of the German Empire. It was formerly the seat of, respectively the German Kreis Apenrade and the Danish Aabenraa County.

=== Former municipality ===
The 1970-2006 Aabenraa municipality was bordered by the municipality of Lundtoft to the south and east, and Rødekro and Tinglev to the west. As it was partially located on a peninsula, it was surrounded by water on three sides: at the southern side of the peninsula by Aabenraa Fjord opening up to the Little Belt east of the peninsula; at the northern side by Genner Bay (Genner Bugt). in South Jutland County on the east coast of the Jutland peninsula in south Denmark. The municipality, including the island of Barsø, covered an area of 129 km^{2} with a total population of 22,132 (2005). Its last mayor was Poul Thomsen, a member of the Venstre (Liberal Party) political party.

A new Aabenraa municipality was formed on 1 January 2007 as the result of Kommunalreformen ("The Municipal Reform" of 2007) where the former municipality merged with Bov, Lundtoft, Rødekro, and Tinglev.

== Locations ==
Largest cities and villages in Aabenraa Municipality
Name	Population (2024)
Aabenraa	16,505
Rødekro	6,193
Padborg	4,258
Tinglev	2,783
Løjt Kirkeby	2,375
Hjordkær	1,619
Kruså	1,515
Bylderup-Bov	1,311
Kliplev	1,234
Stubbæk	1,191

== Politics ==
Aabenraa's municipal council consists of 31 members, elected every four years. The municipal council has nine political committees.

=== Municipal council ===
Below are the municipal councils elected since the Municipal Reform of 2007.

Election	Party								Total seats	Turnout	Elected mayor
Election	A	C	D	F	O	S	V	Ø	Total seats	Turnout	Elected mayor
2005	17	2			1	2	9		31	74.1%	Tove Larsen (A)
2009	14	1		2	2	2	10		31	67.2%	Tove Larsen (A)
2013	8	1		1	5	2	13	1	31	71.8%	Thomas Andresen (V)
2017	9	2		1	5	2	11	1	31	70.7%	Thomas Andresen (V)
2021	9	4	2	1	2	2	11		31	66.5%	Jan Riber Jakobsen (C)
Data from Kmdvalg.dk 2005, 2009, 2013, 2017 and 2021

== North Schleswig Germans ==
Aabenraa Municipality is home to the only officially recognised ethno-linguistic minority of Denmark proper, the North Schleswig Germans. This minority makes up about 6% of the total population of the municipalities of Aabenraa (German: Apenrade), Haderslev (German: Hadersleben), Sønderborg (German: Sonderburg) and Tønder (German: Tondern). In these four municipalities, the German minority enjoys certain linguistic rights in accordance with the European Charter for Regional or Minority Languages.

The German-language daily Der Nordschleswiger is published in Aabenraa.

== Twin towns – sister cities ==
Aabenraa is twinned with:

- Kaltenkirchen, Germany
