= Diocese of Haderslev =

Diocese of Haderslev Haderslev Stift
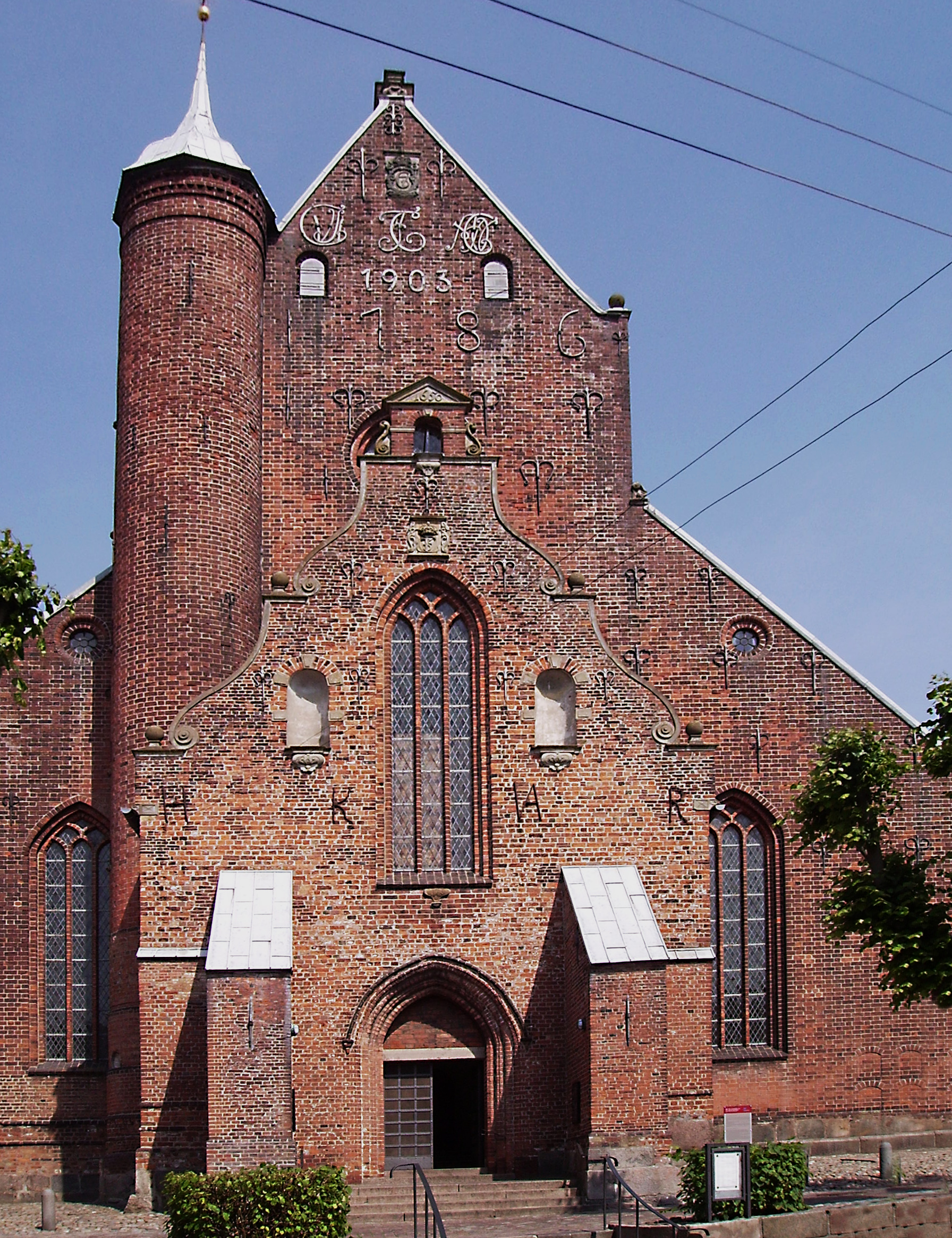
- Haderslev Cathedral

Statistics
- Population: Total: (as of 2016); 474,885
- Members: 385,362 (81.2%)

Information
- Denomination: Church of Denmark
- Cathedral: Cathedral of Our Lady in Haderslev

Current leadership
- Bishop: Marianne Christiansen

The Diocese of Haderslev (Danish: Haderslev Stift) is a diocese within the Church of Denmark, established in 1922. On 5 March 1924, the Church of Our Lady in Haderslev became a Cathedral by royal decree.

== List of Bishops ==
- Ove Waldemar Ammundsen, 1923–1936
- Carl Wulff Noack, 1936–1955
- Frode Beyer, 1956–1964
- Thyge Vilhelm Kragh, 1964–1980
- Olav Christian Lindegaard, 1980–1999
- Niels Henrik Arendt, 1999–2013
- Marianne Christiansen, 2013–present
