= 1963–64 Danish Cup qualifying rounds =

DBUs Landspokalturnering 1963–64

Tournament details
- Country: Denmark
- Dates: May 1963 – July 1963 (qualifying competition); 17 August 1963 – 7 May 1964 (main competition)
- Teams: 707 (overall); 671 (qualifying competition); 80 (main competition)

Tournament statistics
- Matches played: 79 (main competition)

The 1963–64 Danish Cup qualifying rounds inaugurated the 10th season for the Danish Cup (DBUs Landspokalturnering). The qualifying rounds of the cup tournament were governed by the six regional football associations, the Bornholm FA, Copenhagen FA, Funen FA, Jutland FA, Lolland-Falster FA and Zealand FA. 671 teams were registered for the qualifying rounds, of which only 44 teams would quality for the proper rounds, under the auspices of the Danish FA's tournament committee, joined by 36 additional teams from the first, second and third divisions in the Danish football league system. The Danish FA dictated that the ticket prices to the qualifying matches should be at least DKK 2 for adults and DKK 1 for children.

== Bornholm FA ==
Only one team from the Bornholm FA (BBU) qualified for a spot in the proper rounds of the cup tournament. The qualifying rounds for the member clubs of Bornholm FA were played in June and July 1963 and were split into two qualification groups known as group A and B, with Rø IF winning the final match of group B qualifying the club to play in the quarterfinals. Teams placed in group A were the teams from the 1963 Bornholm Series and the 1963 Kvalifikationsturneringen, while group B included teams from the sixth and seventh level leagues, the BBUs A-række and BBUs B-række, featured five teams registered to the cup tournament; Gudhjem IF, Rø IF, Østermarie IF, Aarsballe BK and Klemensker IF, excluding any reserve teams in the regional leagues. Rønne IK was the only Bornholm-based club participating in top four national divisions under the auspices of the Danish FA, playing in the 1963 Kvalifikationsturneringen, and entered the cup tournament for the first time in the third qualifying round. Nexø BK won the final regional qualifying match against Rønne IK, securing their place in the main cup tournament, for which they were awarded a new trophy by the chairman of the Bornholm FA and the first lot in the annual regional cup qualifier final. The silver trophy, donated to the Bornholms FA, was financed and sponsored by the local newspaper, Bornholms Tidende, and had to be won three times in a row or five times in total in order for a club to keep it permanently.

=== First BBU qualifying round ===
The first qualifying cup match on Bornholm was played on 26 June 1963 between Rø IF of the 1963 BBUs A-række and the only representative for the 1963 BBUs B-række, Klemensker IF. The entire path for the Group B qualifiers was determined before the first match took place.

26 June 1963	Klemensker IF (7)	2–4 (a.e.t.)	Rø IF (6)	Klemensker
19:00 CET				Stadium: Klemensker Stadium

=== Second BBU qualifying round ===
The two matches included the winner from the first qualifying match and the remaining teams signed up from the 1963 BBUs A-række.

27 June 1963	Østermarie IF (6)	1–3	Aarsballe BK (6)	Østermarie
19:00 CET	Niels J. Marcher 1h'		Bent Mortensen 1h', 2h', 2h'

3 July 1963	Gudhjem IF (6)	3–10	Rø IF (6)	Gudhjem
19:00 CET			Asger Nielsen ?', ?', ?', ?'; Flemming Ancher ?', ?'; Gustav Krøyer ?'; Torben Nielsen ?'; Egon Mogensen ?'; Flemming Nielsen ?'	Stadium: Gudhjems bane

=== Third BBU qualifying round ===
Four teams from the 1963 Bornholm Series entered the cup tournament for the first time, while Allinge-Sandvig GF received a bye for the next round. It was predetermined that the teams of group A and group B would not play matches against each other until the next round.

4 July 1963	Rønne IK (4)	9–2	Pedersker IF (5)	Rønne
19:00 CET	Poul Anker Mortensen 4'; Svend Andreasen 47', 56', 61'; Kurt Thorn 62', 68'; Ole Kofoed 69'; Knud Andersen 77'; Palle Thorn 78'		Kurt Landin 70'; Ebbe Hansen 89'	Stadium: Rønne Stadium

4 July 1963	Aakirkeby IF (5)	4–3	Hasle IF (5)	Aakirkeby
19:00 CET	Niels Bødtger 1', ?', ?'; Erik Kofoed ?'		Ole Landing ?'; Kaj Jensen ?', 85'

Allinge-Sandvig GF (5)	bye

10 July 1963	Aarsballe BK (6)	4–7 (a.e.t.)	Rø IF (6)	Aarsballe
18:45 CET				Stadium: Aarsballes bane Attendance: 150

=== Fourth BBU qualifying round ===
The winner of the group B qualifying path, Rø IF, played against Allinge-Sandvig GF, who entered the regional qualifying rounds for the first time following a bye in the first round.

3 July 1963	IK Viking (5)	1–0	Svaneke BK (5)	Rønne
19:00 CET	Arvid Mogensen 75'			Stadium: Rønne Stadium

3 July 1963	Nexø BK (5)	3–1	Østerlars BK (5)	Nexø
19:00 CET	Tommy Kofoed 10', 51', 66'		Ib Jensen 43'	Stadium: Nexø Stadium; Referee: Tonny Larsen

11 July 1963	Aakirkeby IF (5)	1–3	Rønne IK (4)	Aakirkeby
18:45 CET	Preben Olsen 20'		Ole Kofoed 10', 44'; Svend Andresen 43'	Stadium: Aakirkeby Stadium; Attendance: 200; Referee: Bent Nielsen (IK Viking)

14 July 1963	Allinge-Sandvig GF (5)	1–0	Rø IF (6)	Allinge-Sandvig
10:00 CET	Tom Hansen 56'			Stadium: Allinge Stadium; Attendance: 100; Referee: Verner Mortensen (Klemensker)

=== Fifth BBU qualifying round ===
A draw held on 15 July 1963 determined the ground for the second match in the fifth qualifying round, also referred to as the regional semi-finals for Bornholm, played on 17 July 1963.

11 July 1963	IK Viking (5)	0–1	Nexø BK (5)	Rønne
18:45 CET			Keld Johansen 66'	Stadium: Rønne Stadium; Referee: Børge Steffensen (Rønne IK)

17 July 1963	Rønne IK (4)	5–1	Allinge-Sandvig GF (5)	Rønne
19:00 CET (Note: The qualifying cup game between Rønne IK and Allinge-Sandvig GF was scheduled to take place at 18:30 CET, but the start was delayed with a half hour.)	Kurt Thorn 33', 43', 2h', 2h' Leif Kjøller 8?'		Kurt Jensen 2h'	Stadium: Rønne Stadium

=== Sixth BBU qualifying round ===
The sixth qualifying round was also referred to as the regional cup final for Bornholm.

20 July 1963	Nexø BK (5)	2–1	Rønne IK (4)	Nexø
18:30 CET	Tommy Kofoed 20', 83'		Ole Kofoed 60'	Stadium: Nexø BKs bane at Ferskesø and Gasværksvej; Attendance: 700; Referee: Bent Nielsen (IK Viking)

== Copenhagen FA ==
Out of 48 potential cup participants, excluding the clubs competing in the top three divisions, 45 teams in the 1963 season were registered for the qualifying rounds in the Copenhagen area, administrated by the Copenhagen FA, distributed between all 10 teams from the Copenhagen Series (group A), all 12 teams from the KBUs Mellemrække, all 12 teams from the KBUs A-række and 9 of 12 KBUs B-række. Seedings occurred for teams in the regional second highest league, which would have the top placed teams from the 1962 KBUs Mellemrække enter the second qualifying round, while the bottom three teams would enter the first qualifying round. All the clubs in the Copenhagen Series and the two Copenhagen-based teams in the Kvalifikationsturneringen entered the second qualifying round. Over the course of three qualifying rounds and 37 matches, the field would be narrowed down to 8 teams that would enter the first round proper.

=== First KBU qualifying round ===
The draw for the first qualifying regional was held by Copenhagen FA on 8 May 1963. The bottom three clubs from the final standings of the 1962 KBUs Mellemrække including teams in the lower ranking leagues entered the first round. The matches were played between 22 and 29 May 1963.

22 May 1963	BK Pioneren (7)	v	BK Skjold (7)	Valby, Copenhagen
18:15 CET				Stadium: Vigerslev

22 May 1963	B 1950 (6)	v	BK Sylvia (6)	Østerbro, Copenhagen
18:15 CET				Stadium: Klosterhaven, Fælleden

22 May 1963	BK Sporvejene (8)	v	BK Vestia (7)	Valby, Copenhagen
18:15 CET

23 May 1963	BK Heimdal (8)	1–4	Politiets IF (7)	Østerbro, Copenhagen
10:00 CET				Stadium: Fælleden

23 May 1963	BK Posten København (8)	1–2	BK Viktoria (7)	Valby, Copenhagen
10:00 CET

23 May 1963	Dragør BK (6)	4–2	Valby BK (7)	Dragør
10:00 CET				Stadium: Dragør Idrætspark

23 May 1963	BK Hekla (7)	9–1	Folehavens IK (8)	Sundbyøster, Copenhagen
10:00 CET				Stadium: Kløvermarkens Idrætsanlæg

23 May 1963	BK Velo Copenhagen (8)	4–2	BK Union (7)	Copenhagen
10:00 CET				Stadium: Grønnemose

23 May 1963	Christianshavns IK (7)	7–1	Bellahøj IF (8)	Sundbyvester, Copenhagen
10:00 CET				Stadium: Sundby Idrætspark

23 May 1963	Vigerslev BK (8)	0–2	Gentofte-Vangede IF (6)	Valby, Copenhagen
10:00 CET

28 May 1963	BK Stadion (6)	v	BK Borup (8)	Gentofte
10:00 CET				Stadium: Gentofte Stadium

29 May 1963	Bispebjerg BK (7)	v	BK Trekanten (7)	Bispebjerg, Copenhagen
18:30 CET				Stadium: Lersøparken

29 May 1963	Valby KFUMs IF (8)	v	BK Vebro (7)	Valby, Copenhagen
18:30 CET				Stadium: Valby Idrætspark

=== Second KBU qualifying round ===
The draw for the second qualifying regional round was held by Copenhagen FA on 8 May 1963. The matches were played between in May and June 1963. The two Copenhagen FA member clubs from the 1963 Kvalifikationsturneringen and the clubs of the 1963 Copenhagen Series entered the cup tournament for the first time. The top placed teams in the final league standings of the 1962 KBUs Mellemrække entered the second round.

28 May 1963	BK Pioneren (7)	0–3	BK Dalgas (5)	Valby, Copenhagen
18:30 CET				Stadium: Vigerslev

30 May 1963	BK Standard (6)	2–1	BK Stefan (5)	Sundbyvester, Copenhagen
18:30 CET				Stadium: Kløvermarkens Idrætsanlæg

30 May 1963	BK Fremad Valby (5)	5–0	BK Hekla (7)	Valby, Copenhagen
18:45 CET				Stadium: Valby Idrætspark

5 June 1963	Dragør BK (6)	v	BK Vestia (7)	Dragør
14:00 CET				Stadium: Dragør Idrætspark

11 June 1963	BK Hero (5)	2–5	Politiets IF (7)	Gladsaxe
18:45 CET	n/a 2h', 2h'		n/a 1h', 1h', 2h', 2h', 2h'	Stadium: Gladsaxe Idrætspark

12 June 1963	BK Viktoria (7)	3–2	BK Mariendal (6)	Østerbro, Copenhagen
18:45 CET				Stadium: Fælleden

12 June 1963	Frederiksberg BK (4)	6–0	BK Trekanten (7)	Frederiksberg
18:45 CET				Stadium: Frederiksberg Idrætspark

12 June 1963	BK Velo Copenhagen (8)	2–4	BK Hellas (5)	Gladsaxe
18:45 CET				Stadium: Grønnemose Allé

12 June 1963	Gentofte-Vangede IF (6)	0–3	B 1908 (5)	Gentofte
18:45 CET				Stadium: Nymosen

12 June 1963	BK Vebro (7)	3–2	Sundby BK (6)	Valby, Copenhagen
18:45 CET

12 June 1963	BK Frederiksholm (5)	2–1	B 1950 (6)	Valby, Copenhagen
18:45 CET

12 June 1963	Tårnby BK (6)	1–2	BK Fremad Amager (4)	Tårnby
18:45 CET	Jørgen Lund 20'; Verner Glæsner Hansen 35' (o.g.)		René Nielsen 1'	Stadium: Tårnby Stadium

12 June 1963	BK Stadion (6)	1–4	Østerbros BK (6)	Gentofte
18:45 CET

13 June 1963	Christianshavns IK (7)	v	Handelsstandens BK (5)	Sundbyvester, Copenhagen
18:45 CET				Stadium: Sundby Idrætspark

13 June 1963	Ryvang FC (6)	v	Husum BK (5)	Østerbro, Copenhagen
18:45 CET				Stadium: Ryparkens Idrætsanlæg

19 June 1963	BK Olympia (6)	2–5	Kastrup BK (5)	Sundbyvester, Copenhagen
18:45 CET				Stadium: Sundby Idrætspark

=== Third KBU qualifying round ===
The draw for the third qualifying regional round was held by Copenhagen FA on 8 May 1963. All the matches were played in June 1963.

12 June 1963	BK Standard (6)	1–2	BK Dalgas (5)	Sundbyvester, Copenhagen
18:45 CET				Stadium: Sundby Idrætspark

19 June 1963	B 1908 (5)	3–1	Ryvang FC (6)	Dragør
18:45 CET				Stadium: Dragør Idrætspark

19 June 1963	Østerbros BK (6)	5–1	BK Viktoria (7)	Østerbro, Copenhagen
18:45 CET				Stadium: Klosterhaven

19 June 1963	BK Fremad Valby (5)	5–2	BK Vebro (7)	Valby, Copenhagen
18:45 CET				Stadium: Valby Fælled

20 June 1963	BK Vestia (7)	0–1 (a.e.t.)	BK Frederiksholm (5)	Valby, Copenhagen
18:45 CET			? 12?' (pen.)	Stadium: Bavnehøjbanerne

20 June 1963	Handelsstandens BK (5)	0–1	Politiets IF (7)	Østerbro, Copenhagen
18:45 CET			? ?h'	Stadium: Klosterhaven

22 June 1963 (Note: The original cup match on 20 June 1963 18:45 CET at Frederiksberg Stadium between Frederiksberg BK and BK Hellas was not finished due to darkness (the score was 2–2 at the time) and a replay match was hence scheduled to take place two days later.) Replay	Frederiksberg BK (4)	?–?	BK Hellas (5)	Frederiksberg
15:30 CET				Stadium: Frederiksberg Stadium

25 June 1963	BK Fremad Amager (4)	1–5	Kastrup BK (5)	Sundbyvester, Copenhagen
18:45 CET	Gustav Salomonsson ?'		Ole Klussmann ?' (pen.), ?' (pen.); Jørgen Osbeck ?', ?'; John Holst ?'	Stadium: Sundby Idrætspark

== Funen FA ==
On 1 May 1963, the programme for the five regional qualifying rounds under the auspices of the Funen FA was announced. A total of 106 teams from the Funen regional football leagues including two clubs in the 1963 Kvalifikationsturneringen, playing a total of 99 cup matches to find the seven clubs that would qualify for the main cup competition. The clubs included 13 entrants from the 1963 FBUs Serie 4, 35 entrants from the 1963 FBUs Serie 3, 29 entrants from the 1963 FBUs Serie 2 and 19 entrants from the 1963 FBUs Serie 1, 8 entrants from the 1963 Funen Series and 2 entrants from the 1963 Kvalifikationsturneringen. It was the first season with more than 100 participants in the qualifying rounds. The first qualifying round for the Funen FA member clubs was inaugurated in early May 1963 and the last regional qualifying matches were played in early July.

Geographical considerations were taken into account at the draw for the first round fixtures involving Funen and the surrounding isles. The clubs competing in the 1963 season of the regional top-flight league, Funen Series, were seeded based on the 1962 season's league standings excluding the reserve teams. Hence, Tved BK and Odense-based club Østre BK (both having been promoted from the 1962 FBUs Serie 1), Ringe BK and Fraugde IF (the two lowest placed teams in the 1962 Funen Series) entered the fourth qualifying round, while Assens G&IK and Aarup BK (placed higher in the 1962 Funen Series final league standings), the two relegated teams from the 1962 Kvalifikationsturneringen, Nyborg G&IF and BK Marienlyst including the two Funen-based teams competing in the 1963 Kvalifikationsturneringen, Svendborg fB and Otterup B&IK entered the fifth qualifying round. The teams, that progressed to the proper rounds were Svendborg fB, Assens G&IK, BK Marienlyst and Nyborg G&IF, Næsby G&IF, Middelfart G&BK and Rudkøbing BK.

=== First FBU qualifying round ===
In the first qualifying round, a total of 96 teams would play 48 matches, originally scheduled to take place no later than 10 May 1963 (Store Bededag), of which 48 teams would progress to the second qualifying round. The overall score was 279 goals made in 48 matches, a decrease compared to 297 goals made in 44 matches during the first round last season. The fixtures involved clubs participating in the 1963 FBUs Serie 1 and the three lower ranking leagues.

7 May 1963	Sanderum BK (6)	0–2	Fangel IF (7)

8 May 1963	Glamsbjerg IF (6)	0–8	Bolbro BK (6)

8 May 1963	Dalby IF (8)	1–2	Dalum Papirfabriks IF Odin 48 (8)

8 May 1963	Allested U&IF (8)	2–0	Brændekilde BK (8)
	Knud Johansen 1h' Jørgen Knudsen 2h'

10 May 1963	Lohals-Hou IF (9)	2–1	Bøstrup G&IF (9)	Lohals
	Frederik Jensen ?'; Svend Erik Jensen ?'		John Jacobsen ?'

10 May 1963	Brændeskov SG&IF (7)	3–4	Thurø BK (7)	Svendborg

10 May 1963	Longelse SF (8)	0–2	Taasinge BK (8)	Longelse
13:30 CET

10 May 1963	Kirkeby IF (8)	7–3	Tullebølle IF (7)	Stenstrup
				Stadium: Kirkeby's bane

10 May 1963	Aarslev BK (7)	3–2	Snøde-Stoense IF (6)	Aarslev

10 May 1963	Lindelse IF (7)	3–2	Krarup SG&IF (8)	Lindelse
10:30 CET	Svend Otto Rasmussen 1h', ?'; Erik Jensen ?'		n/a 1h', 2h'

10 May 1963	Stenstrup BK (6)	3–4	Rudkøbing BK (6)	Stenstrup

10 May 1963	Korinth IF (7)	3–4 (a.e.t.)	Søby BK Kvik (6)

10 May 1963	Ollerup G&UF (9)	5–4	Hillerslev BK (9)

10 May 1963	Ellested IF (9)	6–3	Gislev SG&IF (8)

10 May 1963	Rise S&IF (8)	2–5	Kværndrup BK (7)

10 May 1963	Bagenkop IF (6)	7–4	Ulbølle S&GF (8)	Bagenkop
	Preben Frandsen ?', ?', ?'; Evald Petersen ?', ?'; Ove Kølle ?'; Ingvald Hansen ?'

10 May 1963	Marstal IF (8)	3–1	BK Chang Odense (7)

10 May 1963	Ærøskøbing IK (8)	1–6	Faaborg BK&IF (6)

10 May 1963	Ryslinge BK (9)	6–4	Nørre Lyndelse S&IF (8)

10 May 1963	Brobyværk IF (8)	3–1	Dreslette IF (8)

10 May 1963	Vissenbjerg-Bred IF (8)	2–5	Flemløse BK (8)

10 May 1963	Vester Hæsinge BK (8)	6–2	Sønder Næraa U&IF (8)

10 May 1963	Humble BK (7)	3–2	Haarby BK (6)	Humble
14:00 CET	Hans K. Hansen 1h', 2h' Ulrik Steffensen 2h'		n/a 1h', 2h'

10 May 1963	Vigerslev IF (8)	0–1	BK Frem Odense (7)

10 May 1963	Korup IF (8)	6–2	Allesø GF (8)

10 May 1963	Lumby BK (7)	2–1	OKS (6)

10 May 1963	Veflinge G&IF (8)	w/o (Note: The match between Veflinge G&IF and Hårslev BK was forfeited by Veflinge G&IF due to three of their players not being able to get time off from their military service, and hence Hårslev BK moved on to the next round.)	Hårslev BK (7)

10 May 1963	Skamby SG&IF (7)	0–5	Næsby G&IF (6)
			Eigun Knudsen ?', ?'; Henning Jørgensen ?'; Knud Madsen ?'; Leif Andersen ?'

10 May 1963	Særslev BK (7)	0–4	Søndersø IF (6)

10 May 1963	Krogsbølle G&IF (8)	2–3 (a.e.t.)	Korsløkke BK (7)

10 May 1963	Rørup BK (9)	2–0	Hospitalets FK

10 May 1963	Husby (8)	1–3	Sandager BK (8)

10 May 1963	Kauslunde BK (8)	1–5	Turup IF (8)

10 May 1963	Gelsted G&IF (7)	6–1	Harndrup G&IF (7)

10 May 1963	Ebberup BK (7)	9–2	Ejby G&IK (6)
	Aksel Hansen ?', ?', ?', ?', ?', ?', ?' n/a ?', ?'		n/a ?', ?'

10 May 1963	Thorøhuse IF (8)	1–3	Middelfart G&BK (6)

10 May 1963	Tommerup BK (7)	1–1 (a.e.t.) (3-4 p)	BK Thor Odense (7)	Tommerup

10 May 1963	Refsvindinge IF (8)	3–3 (a.e.t.) (4-3 p)	Tårup U&IF (9)
	Penalties
	n/a (penalty scored) n/a (penalty scored) n/a (penalty scored) n/a (penalty missed) n/a (penalty scored)		n/a (penalty scored) n/a (penalty scored) n/a (penalty scored) n/a (penalty missed) n/a (penalty missed)

10 May 1963	Munkebo-Dræby SK (8)	1–2	Langeskov IF (7)

10 May 1963	Aunslev IF (8)	4–1	Ferritslev BK (7)

10 May 1963	Rynkeby BK (8)	1–5 (a.e.t.)	Kølstrup BK (7)

10 May 1963	Ullerslev BK (6)	2–1	Kerteminde BK (6)

10 May 1963	Højby S&GF (9)	1–12	Tarup IF (9)	Højby

10 May 1963	Seden IF (9)	6–4	AIK (8)

10 May 1963	BK Posten Odense (8)	4–1	Agedrup G&IF (7)

10 May 1963	Marslev GF (9)	0–7	Aaløkke BK (7)
	n/a ?' (o.g.), ?' (o.g.)		n/a ?', ?', ?', ?', ?'

10 May 1963	Bogense G&IF (6)	0–2	Dalum IF (6)
			Mogens Pedersen 8?'; Finn Kalhauge ?'

10 May 1963	Jordløse BK (8)	1–2	Nørre Broby BK (6)

=== Second FBU qualifying round ===
The matches in the second qualifying round at Funen were primarily played on 23 May (Feast of the Ascension) with one match on 21 May. The second qualifying round featured 48 teams playing 24 matches with 24 teams qualifying for the third round – 11 clubs from the FBU's Serie 1, 16 clubs from the FBU's Serie 2, 13 clubs from the FBU's Serie 3 and 8 clubs from the FBU's Serie 4. A total of 118 goals against 40 goals in 24 matches was made.

21 May 1963	Dalum Papirfabriks IF Odin 48 (8)	4–1 (a.e.t.)	Langeskov IF (7)

23 May 1963	Lohals-Hou IF (9)	3–16	Thurø BK (7)	Lohals bane
			Kaj Hansen ?', ?', ?'; Jørgen Thomsen ?', ?', ?'; Jens Otto Nielsen ?', ?', ?'; Mogens Lund ?', ?'; Mogens Jensen ?', ?'; Arne Christiansen ?', ?'; Flemming Jacobsen ?'

23 May 1963	Taasinge BK (8)	5–2	Kirkeby IF (8)

23 May 1963	Lindelse IF (7)	2–4	Aarslev BK (7)

23 May 1963	Søby BK Kvik (6)	0–5	Rudkøbing BK (6)	Søby
				Stadium: Kviks bane

23 May 1963	Ellested IF (9)	2–3	Ollerup G&UF (9)

23 May 1963	Bagenkop IF (6)	1–2	Kværndrup BK (7)

23 May 1963	Marstal IF (8)	1–6	Faaborg BK&IF (6)	Marstal

23 May 1963	Brobyværk IF (8)	3–2	Ryslinge BK (9)

23 May 1963	Flemløse BK (8)	4–2	Fangel IF (7)

23 May 1963	Vester Hæsinge BK (8)	6–1	Humble BK (7)

23 May 1963	BK Frem Odense (7)	0–3	Bolbro BK (6)

23 May 1963	Korup IF (8)	0–1	Lumby BK (7)

23 May 1963	Hårslev BK (7)	1–5	Næsby G&IF (6)	Haarslev

23 May 1963	Korsløkke BK (7)	3–2	Søndersø IF (6)

23 May 1963	Rørup BK (9)	9–2	Sandager BK (8)

23 May 1963	Turup IF (8)	3–8	Gelsted G&IF (7)

23 May 1963	Ebberup BK (7)	3–4	Middelfart G&BK (6)	Ebberup

23 May 1963	BK Thor Odense (7)	4–2	Refsvindinge IF (8)	Refsvindinge

23 May 1963	Kølstrup BK (7)	7–1	Aunslev IF (8)

23 May 1963	Tarup IF (9)	3–5 (a.e.t.)	Ullerslev BK (6)

23 May 1963	Seden IF (9)	3–4	Allested U&IF (8)

23 May 1963	Aaløkke BK (7)	3–1	BK Posten Odense (8)

23 May 1963	Dalum IF (6)	2–3	Nørre Broby BK (6)	Dalum
				Stadium: Dalums bane

=== Third FBU qualifying round ===
The matches in the third qualifying round were originally scheduled to be played no later than 5 June 1963. 24 teams would play 12 qualifying matches, with 12 teams progressing to the third round.

1 June 1963	Thurø BK (7)	12–0	Taasinge BK (8)

1 June 1963	Lumby BK (7)	5–4	Bolbro BK (6)
	n/a ?h' (pen.) n/a ?h' (pen.)

1 June 1963	BK Thor Odense (7)	1–6	Middelfart G&BK (6)

4 June 1963	Ollerup G&UF (9)	1–4	Kværndrup BK (7)	Ollerup

4 June 1963	Vester Hæsinge BK (8)	3–3 (a.e.t.) (5–6 p)	Flemløse BK (8)	Vester Hæsinge

4 June 1963	Gelsted G&IF (7)	8–0	Rørup BK (9)	Gelsted

4 June 1963	Dalum Papirfabriks IF Odin 48 (8)	2–1	Kølstrup BK (7)

5 June 1963	Brobyværk IF (8)	1–6	Faaborg BK&IF (6)	Brobyværk

5 June 1963	Aarslev BK (7)	1–5	Rudkøbing BK (6)	Aarslev

5 June 1963	Nørre Broby BK (6)	2–3	Aaløkke BK (7)	Nørre Broby
				Stadium: Nørre Brobys bane

1963	Næsby G&IF (6)	4–0	Korsløkke BK (7)

1963	Allested U&IF (8)	3–2	Ullerslev BK (6)

=== Fourth FBU qualifying round ===
The qualifying matches in the fourth round were scheduled to be played before 23 June 1963. The four lowest seeded teams from the 1963 Funen Series made their entry for the first time in this round, all playing away matches.

18 June 1963	Allested U&IF (8)	2–1	Fraugde IF (5)	Allested
	? 1h', 2h'		? 2h'

20 June 1963	Faaborg BK&IF (6)	5–1	Flemløse BK (8)	Faaborg
19:00 CET

20 June 1963	Middelfart G&BK (6)	5–1	Dalum Papirfabriks IF Odin 48 (8)	Middelfart
19:00 CET				Stadium: Middelfart Stadium

21 June 1963	Aaløkke BK (7)	2–4	Østre BK (5)
19:00 CET	Kurt Hermansen 1h', 70'		Frank Gaba 73', 76', 81'; Kaj Rasmussen 79'

22 June 1963	Lumby BK (7)	4–2	Ringe BK (5)
16:00 CET	Jens Rasmussen ?'; Morten Stolborg ?', ?' (pen.), ?' (pen.)		Leif Poulsen ?', ?'

22 June 1963	Gelsted G&IF (7)	0–2	Næsby G&IF (6)
18:30 CET

22 June 1963	Kværndrup BK (7)	0–4	Rudkøbing BK (6)
19:00 CET			Ove Petersen ?', ?', ?'; Erik Petersen ?'

22 June 1963	Thurø BK (7)	1–3	Tved BK (5)
19:30 CET	Mogens Jensen 1h'		Arne Christensen 2h', 2h' Erik Christensen 2h'

=== Fifth FBU qualifying round ===
The fifth and final qualifying round under the Funen FA (FBU) consisted of 7 matches between two Kvalifikationsturneringen teams, six Funen Series teams, four FBUs Serie 1 teams and two FBUs Serie 2 teams. The matches were originally scheduled to be played before 30 June 1963. The four remaining highest seeded teams from the 1963 Funen Series made their entry, joining the 8 teams from the fourth qualifying round.

26 June 1963	Faaborg BK&IF (6)	0–1	Svendborg fB (4)	Faaborg
			Erik Mølgård 3'

26 June 1963	Allested U&IF (8)	0–1	Nyborg G&IF (5)
			Palle Mortensen 80'

27 June 1963	Næsby G&IF (6)	2–2 (a.e.t.) (6–5 p)	Otterup B&IK (4)
	Edmund Nielsen 1/2h' Eigun Knudsen 3/4h'		Bent Jensen 1/2h' Torben Olsen 3/4h'
	Penalties
	n/a (penalty scored) n/a (penalty scored) n/a (penalty scored) n/a (penalty scored)		(penalty scored) n/a (penalty missed) Børge Hougaard; (penalty scored) n/a (penalty scored) n/a

27 June 1963	Østre BK (5)	1–4	BK Marienlyst (5)
	Frank Gaba 2h'		Jens Torstensen 1h' Arne Rasmussen 55'; Thomas Winkler 2h' (2h)

30 June 1963	Lumby BK (7)	4–7	Assens G&IK (5)	Lumby
	Morten Stolborg ?', ?'; Erling Nielsen ?'; Jens Rasmussen ?'		Tommy Jensen 1h', 2h', 2h' Helge Desler 1h', 2h' Kaj Esmann 1h' Ilkjær Brandt 2h'	Stadium: Lumbys bane

4 July 1963	Tved BK (5)	0–3	Rudkøbing BK (6)	Tved
19:00 CET			Ove Pedersen ?'; Kurt Hansen ?'; Poul Bjørn Petersen ?'

6 July 1963	Middelfart G&BK (6)	5–3	Aarup BK (5)	Middelfart
	Arne Jensen 1h', 1h' Jørgen Cræmer 1h', 2h' Svend Otto Andersen 2h'		Henning Madsen 1h', 1h' Jørgen Land 1h'

== Jutland FA ==
A total number of 390 teams were registered for the regional qualifying rounds under the auspices of the Jutland FA, an additional 35 teams compared with the last season, the largest number of regional clubs in history. Only 16 teams will move on to the first round proper. More than 360 cup matches were played in the qualifying rounds governed by Jutland FA. The following 16 teams progressed to the first round proper: Silkeborg IF, Vorup Frederiksberg BK, Brande IF, Hjørring IF, IK Aalborg Freja, Esbjerg KFUM, Viby IF, BK Herning Fremad, Taars-Ugilt IF, Hobro IK, Thisted IK, Varde GF, Vejen SF, Borup FF, Bjerringbro IF and Hadsund BK.

=== First JBU qualifying round ===
In the weekend of 4–5 May, there was a break in the league tournament's match schedules for the Jutland FA's Series 1, 2, 3 and 4 as the initial couple of first qualifying round fixtures took place – only a match in the 1963 Jutland Series and previously canceled senior league matches were scheduled. The first qualifying round had 179 fixtures involving 32 teams from JBU's Serie 1, 67 teams from JBU's Serie 2, 125 teams from JBU's Serie 3 and 135 teams from JBU's Serie 4, which had been found by drawing lots at Jutlands FA's office. In 68 fixtures, teams from the same league played each other (4 teams in JBU's Serie 2, 24 teams in JBU's Serie 3, 40 teams JBU's Serie 4 and no teams from JBU's Serie 1).

2 May 1963	Grejsdalen (serie 3)	3–4	Fredericia fF	Grejsdalen

2 May 1963	Lem BK (serie 3)	3–0	Bækmarksbro (serie 2)	Lem near Ringkøbing

5 May 1963	Vester Hjermitslev BK	v	Asaa BK

5 May 1963	Tornby	v	Poulstrup IF

5 May 1963	Mosbjerg IF	v	Sæby

5 May 1963	Dybvad	v	Tolne IF

5 May 1963	Klokkerholm IF	v	Birkelse IF

5 May 1963	Skibsby-Højene IF	v	Kvissel IF

5 May 1963	Løkken	v	Taars-Ugilt IF (6)

5 May 1963	Dronninglund (serie 2)	1–0	Bindslev (serie 1)	Dronninglund

5 May 1963	Børglum	v	Hjørring AIK Frem

5 May 1963	Tranum (serie 4)	v	Øster Brønderslev IF (serie 3)	Tranum

5 May 1963	Hirtshals BK	v	Jerslev

5 May 1963	Flauenskjold	v	Gølstrup or Gjølstrup (serie 4)	Flauenskjold
14:00 CET

4 May 1963	Aabybro BK (serie 2)	v	Vester Hassing (serie 3)	Aabybro
				Stadium: Aabybro Stadium

5 May 1963	Vraa IF	v	BK Bangsbo Freja

5 May 1963	Gandrup SK	v	Syvsten IF

5 May 1963	Sulsted	v	Skovsgaard BK

5 May 1963	Sindal IF (serie 3)	v	Saltum IF (serie 2)	Sindal
				Stadium: Sindal Stadium

4 May 1963	Tylstrup (serie 2)	v	Mølholm (serie 4)	Tylstrup

5 May 1963	Thise	v	Hørby

4 May 1963	Pandrup BK (serie 4)	v	Halvrimmen IK (serie 2)	Pandrup
				Stadium: Pandrup Stadium

5 May 1963	Serritslev IF	v	Strandby

5 May 1963	Gjøl G&BK (serie 4)	v	Kaas IF (serie 2)	Gjøl

5 May 1963	Brovst IF (serie 4)	v	Holtet (serie 4)	Brovst
				Stadium: Brovst Stadium

5 May 1963	Sterup	v	Hals

5 May 1963	Østervraa	v	Ørsø

5 May 1963	Ulsted	v	Voersaa

5 May 1963	Gug BK	v	Løgstør IF

5 May 1963	Strandby	v	Hobro IK

5 May 1963	Nr. Kongerslev IF	v	Nibe BK

4 May 1963	Mou IF (serie 4)	v	Godthaab IF (serie 2)	Mou
				Stadium: Mou Stadium

5 May 1963	Hadsund	v	Storvorde-Sejlflod BK

5 May 1963	Hornum IF	v	Nørre Uttrup

5 May 1963	Aars IK (serie 2)	v	Veddum IF (serie 3)	Aars (Note: The cup match between Veddum IF and Aars IK was originally scheduled to take place in Veddum, but was relocated to Aars Stadium due to expectations of a larger attendance.)
				Stadium: Aars Stadium

5 May 1963	Ellidshøj	v	BK Viking Als	Arden

5 May 1963	Gudumholm	v	Aalborg KFUM

5 May 1963	Vejgaard Heden	v	Sebber

4 May 1963	Bælum (serie 4)	v	Aalborg FC	Bælum

5 May 1963	Støvring	v	Nørager BK

5 May 1963	Aggersund	v	Rørdal

5 May 1963	IK Frem Suldrup	v	Rørbæk

5 May 1963	Oue	v	Skals FF Valkyrien

5 May 1963	IF Frem Skørping (serie 3)	v	Lundby Krat BK (serie 3)

5 May 1963	Øster Uttrup	v	Astrup

5 May 1963	Vaarst BK (serie 4)	v	IF Jarl Arden (serie 3)	Vaarst

5 May 1963	IF Vagten Dokkedal (serie 3)	v	Gundersted IF	Dokkedal
				Stadium: Dokkedal Stadium

5 May 1963	Rostrup BK (serie 3)	v	Skalborg	Rostrup

5 May 1963	Terndrup IF	v	Romdrup-Klarup GF

5 May 1963	Skelund	v	Raaby-Dalbyover IF

5 May 1963	Albæk IF	v	Mariager

5 May 1963	Hvam (serie 4)	v	Farsø IK (serie 3)	Hvam

5 May 1963	Aalestrup IK	v	Valsgaard

5 May 1963	Svenstrup GF	v	Ranum

5 May 1963	Hvalpsund	v	Vester Hornunm

5 May 1963	Spenstrup	v	Hvilsom IF

5 May 1963	Faarup	v	Gedsted

5 May 1963	Udbyhøj	v	Ulbjerg

5 May 1963	Gjerlev/Enslev	v	Østrup

5 May 1963	Fjeldsø	v	Havndal-Udbyneder IF

May 1963	Vojens (serie 1)	1–2	Sdr. Hygum (serie 3)

May 1963	Vamdrup BK (serie 2)	4–3	Ribe BK&GF (serie 1)

6 May 1963	Uldum	v	Vejle FC

Maybe 5 May 1963	Bredballe	11–1	Kolding AIK

Maybe 5 May 1963	BK Vejle Kammeraterne	11–0	Jordrup

Maybe 5 May 1963	Hover (serie 4)	2–6	Fredericia KFUM (serie 2)
	Gert Olsen ?h' (?h), ?h' Torben Hansen ?h' (?h); Tage Dall ?h'

Maybe 5 May 1963	Daugård	4–0	SF Frem Thyregod

Maybe 5 May 1963	Egtved	6–1	B 1940

Maybe 5 May 1963	Løsning IF	0–1	Skanderborg

5 May 1963	Kolding BK (serie 2)	1–3	Horsens Freja (serie 2)	Kolding
				Stadium: Mosevej Sportsplads

Maybe 5 May 1963	Ølholm IF	1–15	Vorbasse BK

Maybe 5 May 1963	Vinding SF	3–1	Bække SF (serie 4)

Maybe 5 May 1963	Hedensted IF	1–2 (a.e.t.)	SF Give Fremad

May 1963	Brørup GF (serie 1)	3–4 (a.e.t.)	Jerne IF (serie 2)	Brørup

5 May 1963	Grenaa IF (serie 1)	v	Brabrand IF (serie 3)	Grenaa

May 1963	Spjald (serie 1)	8–0	Herning KFUM (serie 2)	Spjald

May 1963	Stoholm IF (serie 1)	v	Viborg Søndermarken (serie 2)

4 May 1963	Dronningborg BK (serie 1)	v	Aarhus 1900 (serie 3)

May 1963	Varde (serie 1)	v	Spangsbjerg (serie 2)

5 May 1963	Rødekro (serie 3)	4–0	Lysabild (serie 3)	Rødekro
				Stadium: Rødekro Stadium

5 May 1963	Hatting (serie 3)	v	Odder I&GF (serie 2)

5 May 1963	Ebeltoft	v	Auning IF	Ebeltoft
				Stadium: Ebeltoft Stadium

5 May 1963	Rønde GF (serie 2)	1–0	Hinnerup og Omegns GF (serie 1)	Rønde

5 May 1963	Gjerrild	v	Randers BK Fremad (serie 1)	Gjerrild

5 May 1963	Trustrup IF (serie 3)	v	Feldballe (serie 4)

5 May 1963	Kolind	v	Hammel GF

5 May 1963	Ryomgaard (same league)	v	Vejlby-Risskov IK (same league)	Ryomgaard
				Stadium: Ryomgaard Stadium

5 May 1963	Tirstrup	v	Langaa IK (serie 2)	Tirstrup

5 May 1963	Perstrup	v	Aarhus KFUM (serie 2)

5 May 1963	Nimtofte (serie 4)	v	Kristrup BK (serie 2)

5 May 1963	IF Viking Pindstrup	v	Nordbyen, Randers	Pindstrup
				Stadium: Pindstrup Stadium

May 1963	Skanderborg BK	v	Them (serie 4)

=== Second JBU qualifying round ===
The Jutland FA made the draws for the second qualifying round after the conclusion of the first qualifying round, and involved 89 fixtures. The matches in the first qualifying round were played in the second half of May 1963. The second qualifying round had 89 fixtures involving 26 teams from JBU's Serie 1, 48 teams from JBU's Serie 2, 64 teams from JBU's Serie 3 and 43 teams from JBU's Serie 4.

May 1963	Hald IF (serie 1)	v	Stoholm IF (serie 1)

23 May 1963	Bjerringbro IF	6–2	Gammel Rye IF

23 May 1963	Aabyhøj IF Thrott (serie 1)	4–1	Dronningborg BK (serie 1)	Aarhus
10:30 CET	Finn Overby 10' ? 2h' Max Bering 2h' Henning Kellermann 2h' (pen.)		Bent Jensen 8?'	Stadium: AIFs Bane

23 May 1963	Randers BK Fremad (serie 1)	9–3	IF Viking Pindstrup (serie 2)	Randers
10:00 CET	Volmer Nielsen 15', 2h', 2h' John Nielsen 25', 40', 2h' Finn Jørgensen 47'; Allan Christensen 2h' Preben Jensen 2h'		Bjarne Pedersen 60', 62'; Orla Pedersen 8?'	Stadium: Højbanen

23 May 1963	Ørsted IF (serie 2)	2–1	Rønde GF (serie 3)	Ørsted
	Peter Pedersen 20'; Per Hackenberg 43'		Børge Jacobsen 52' (pen.)	Stadium: Ørsted Stadium

23 May 1963	Trustrup IF (serie 3)	6–1	Kristrup BK (serie 2)	Trustrup
	Svend Leth 10', 25', 61', 88'; Leif Jensen 43'; Henning Bagger 80'		Jens Søeberg 65'	Stadium: Trustrup Stadium

22 May 1963	Langaa IK	5–3	Randers KFUM	Langå
	Jørgen Petersen 1h' Henning Christoffersen 1h' Mogens Østergård 30', 2h' Hans Johansen 2h'		Leif Laugesen 1h' Niels Erik Nielsen 40'; Ejvind Kristensen 60' (pen.)	Stadium: Langå Stadium

23 May 1963	Grindsted G&IF (serie 1)	2–3	B 29, Esbjerg (serie 1)	Grindsted
	Poul E. Bækgård 10'; Max Andreasen 2h' (pen.)		Per Knudsen 15'; Niels Petersen 2h' Henning Andersen 75'

May 1963	Fredericia fF (serie 1)	bye

May 1963	Skjern GF (serie 2)	v	Kølkær (serie 2)

23 May 1963	Auning IF (serie 2)	7–2	Aarhus KFUM (serie 2)	Auning
	Finn Yde 20', 50', 53', 85', 87'; Erik Erbo Sørensen 70', 73'		Poul Erik Holm 30'; Vilhelm Krarup 54'	Stadium: Auning Stadium

23 May 1963	Brovst IF (serie 4)	v	Serritslev IF (serie 4)	Brovst

May 1963	Bylderup (serie 4)	v	Fole (serie 4)

23 May 1963	SF Give Fremad (serie 2)	0–1	Vejle FC	Give
			Ib Simonsen 15'

23 May 1963	BK Vejle Kammeraterne	3–2	Pjedsted	Vejle
	Helge Fabricius Jensen 1h', 2h' Svend Erik Volquards 2h'		? 1h', 2h'	Stadium: Banen ved Østergade

23 May 1963	Skanderborg BK	9–2	Bredballe IF	Skanderborg
	? 1h', 1h', 2h', 2h', 2h', 2h', 2h', 2h', 2h'		? 2h', 2h'

23 May 1963	Vinding SF	2–9	Jelling	Vinding

May 1963	Skanderborg BK	v	Karup IF (serie 2)

23 May 1963	Ry SK (serie 4)	5–3	Kjellerup IF	Ry
				Stadium: Ry Stadium

May 1963	Højslev (serie 2)	v	Skelhøje FF Frem (serie 1)

23 May 1963	Tolne IF	4–3	Flauenskjold

23 May 1963	Birkelse IF	5–1	Tylstrup

23 May 1963	Poulstrup IF	0–1	Hirtshals BK

23 May 1963	Øster Brønderslev IF (serie 3)	3–2	Gjøl G&BK (serie 4)	Øster Brønderslev
14:00 CET

22 May 1963	Hjørring AIK Frem (serie 3)	9–2	Vraa IF	Hjørring
	Kaj Brøndum ?h', ?h', ?h', ?h', ?h', ?h' ? ?h', ?h', ?h'		Poul Erik Jensen 1h' ? 1h'	Stadium: Hjørring Stadium

23 May 1963	Ulsted	2–3	Dronninglund

23 May 1963	Sæby	9–2	Sindal IF

23 May 1963	Kvissel IF	10–1	Gandrup SK

23 May 1963	Sterup	0–1	Asaa BK

23 May 1963	Taars-Ugilt IF (6)	5–1	Østervraa

23 May 1963	Brovst IF (serie 4)	2–1	Serritslev IF (serie 4)	Brovst

22 May 1963	Sulsted (serie 4)	1–2	Aabybro BK (serie 3)	Sulsted
	? 2h'		Orla Andersen 10'; Erik Larsen 1h'	Stadium: Sulsted Stadium

23 May 1963	Hørby (serie 2)	2–4	Pandrup BK (serie 4)	Hørby

23 May 1963	Hobro IK (6)	9–2	Skals FF Valkyrien

23 May 1963	Hvalpsund	2–4	Løgstør IF

23 May 1963	Nørre Uttrup (serie 2)	0–2	Rostrup BK (serie 3)	Nørre Uttrup
			Søren Sørensen ?h', ?h'

23 May 1963	Gedsted	2–1	Aggersund

23 May 1963	Aalborg FC	1–2	IF Vagten Dokkedal

23 May 1963	Romdrup-Klarup GF	0–3	Hadsund BK

23 May 1963	Nibe BK (serie 2)	1–0	Mou IF (serie 4)	Nibe
	Per Frederiksen 2h'			Stadium: Nibe Stadium

23 May 1963	Nørager BK	4–0	Spentrup IF

23 May 1963	IF Jarl Arden (serie 3)	3–5	Aalborg KFUM (serie 2)	Arden
	? 2h', 2h', 2h'		? 1h', 1h', 15', ?h', ?h'	Stadium: Arden Stadium

23 May 1963	Astrup	1–3	Gerlev-Enslev IF

23 May 1963	Albæk IF (serie 5)	4–5 (a.e.t.)	IF Frem Skørping (serie 3)	Albæk

23 May 1963	Borup FF	3–1	Grønhøj

23 May 1963	Hammel GF	3–4	Kragelund IF	Hammel
	Hans Pedersen 13', 88'; Bent Pedersen 2h' (pen.)		? 1h', 1h', 1h', 75'

23 May 1963	Mørke IF (serie 3)	2–3	Grenaa IF (serie 1)	Mørke
	Børge Riis 1h' Mogens Darre 88'		Finn Geertsen 60'; Erling Svendsen 65', 80'	Stadium: Mørke Stadium

23 May 1963	Houlbjerg GF	3–2	Raasted

23 May 1963	Ulbjerg IF	9–2	IK Frem Suldrup

23 May 1963	Farsø IK (serie 3)	2–4	Raaby-Dalbyover IF (serie 2)	Farsø
	? 1h' (pen.)		Kaj Pedersen 10', 1?', 1h' Gunnar Stegger 1h'	Stadium: Farsø Stadium

23 May 1963	Aars IK	3–1	Ellidshøj
	Egon Christensen ?h' Bent Olesen ?h' Ove Olesen ?h'		n/a 1h'

23 May 1963	Svenstrup GF	4–3	Fjeldsø

23 May 1963	Aalestrup IK	5–3	Vejgaard Heden

23 May 1963	Odder I&GF (serie 2)	v	Vorbasse BK (serie 1)

=== Third JBU qualifying round ===
The matches in the third qualifying round were scheduled to be played in June 1963.

1 June 1963	Bjerringbro IF (7)	7–1	Højslev Station IF (serie 2)	Bjerringbro
18:30 CET	Elmer Knudsen ?h', ?h' Folmer Padkjær ?h', ?h' Freddy Sørensen ?h', ?h' Jørgen Mikkelsen ?h'		? ?h'	Stadium: Bjerringbro Stadium

1 June 1963	Vejen SF (serie 1)	12–2	Hejnsvig IF (serie 3)	Vejen

2 June 1963	Jerne IF	1–7	B47 Esbjerg (serie 1)	Jerne
10:00 CET	? 2h'		Ole Schlosser ?h', 2h', 2h', 2h' Jarl Johan Jensen ?h', 2h' Erik Laursen ?h'	Stadium: Jerne Stadium

June 1963	B29 Esbjerg (serie 1)	4–2	Ansager SF	Esbjerg
	Poul Christensen ?h' Henning Andersen ?h' Ernst Pedersen ?h' Orla Larsen ?h'		? 1h', 2h'	Stadium: Esbjerg Atletikstadion

2 June 1963	BK Vestkysten Oksbøl (serie 2, kreds 13)	2–4	Varde GF (serie 1)	Oksbøl
13:30 CET	Kurt Jespersen 2h' Ejler Rechnagel 8?'		Ejvind Petersen 50'; Benny Pedersen 51'; Poul Verner Pedersen 55', 2h'	Stadium: Oksbøl Stadium

June 1963	Malling GF (serie 4)	1–3	Vejle FC (serie 1)	Malling
	Kaj Eriksen 75'		Erik Hansen 7?'; Mogens Pladsbjerg 8?' (pen.); Poul E. Christensen 87'

June 1963	Tarp BK	1–3	Bramminge BK (serie 1)	Tarp
	? ?h'		Jørgen Flyvbjerg ?h', ?h' Ejner Platz ?h'

3 June 1963	Silkeborg BK	2–6	Ry SK (serie 4)	Silkeborg
14:00 CET				Stadium: Alderslyst Stadium

3 June 1963	Skanderborg BK	v	Stilling IF (serie 3)	Skanderborg
				Stadium: Skanderborg Stadium

3 June 1963	Feldborg IF (6)	2–1 (a.e.t.)	Herning KFUM
	n/a 44'; Finn Bredgaard 116'		n/a 20'

3 June 1963	Aulum IF	3–4	Ringkjøbing IF	Aulum
	Poul Andersen 21' (pen.), 2?' n/a 63'		n/a 3' n/a 17' n/a 24' n/a ?'	Referee: Orla Amtkjær (Holstebro)

3 June 1963	Vinderup IK (serie 2)	2–3	Ramme (serie 3)	Vinderup
	Knud Tandrup 1h' (pen.) n/a 56'		Allan Krogh 2'; Tage Steenstrup 49', 80'

3 June 1963	Skjern GF	12–3	Videbæk IF

1 June 1963	Trustrup IF (serie 3)	3–2	Aabyhøj IF Thrott (serie 1)	Trustrup
16:30 CET	Svend Leth 12', 2h' Svend Nielsen 1h'		Henning Nyhus 1h' ? 75'	Stadium: Trustrup Stadium

5 June 1963	Nykøbing Mors IF (serie 1)	0–1	Koldby-Hørdum IF (serie 2)

5 June 1963	Borup FF (serie 2)	3–0	Stoholm IF (serie 1)

5 June 1963	Vejlby-Risskov IK (serie 2)	1–0	Randers BK Fremad

5 June 1963	Thisted IK (serie 1)	10–0	Hurup (serie 1)

3 June 1963	Gerlev-Enslev IF	2–6	Langaa IK	Gerlev-Enslev
14:00 CET	? ?h', ?h'		Hans Johansen ?h', ?h', ?h', ?h', ?h' Hans Clausen 8?'	Stadium: Gerlev Stadium

1 June 1963	Raaby-Dalbyover IF	5–2	Aalestrup IK	Raaby
18:30 CET	Vagn Stegger 1h', 2h' Gunnar Stegger 1h', 2h' Tage Elstrup 2h'		? 10' ? 1h'	Stadium: Raaby Stadium

3 June 1963	Ans	1–7	Houlbjerg GF	Ans
14:00 CET			Henning Hansen ?h', ?h' Knud Erik Laursen ?h', ?h' Jørgen Sall ?h' Poul Danielsen ?h' Egon Mouritsen ?h'	Stadium: Ans Stadium

3 June 1963	Auning IF	3–2	Vejlby IK	Auning
10:30 CET	Finn Yde 1h' Arne Nielsen 2h' Erik Sørensen 2h'		? 1h', 1h'	Stadium: Auning Stadium

1 June 1963	Grenaa IF	8–1	Ørsted IF	Grenaa
18:30 CET	Finn Geertsen ?h', ?h', ?h', 2h' Erlin Svendsen ?h', ?h' Jørgen Laursen ?h' Per Andersen ?h'		? ?h'	Stadium: Grenaa Stadium

3 June 1963	Hadsund BK	0–0 (a.e.t.) (3–2 p)	Nørager BK	Hadsund
19:00 CET
	Penalties
	Ib Christensen (penalty missed); Bent Andersen (penalty scored); Ove Holst (penalty scored); Carl Christensen (penalty scored)		Frede Højgaard (penalty scored); Erik Hansen (penalty missed); Kaj Bele (penalty missed); Flemming Stabel (penalty scored)

=== Fourth JBU qualifying round ===
The draw for the fourth qualifying regional round was held by the Jutland FA on 13 June 1963. The matches were originally scheduled to be played on 23 June 1963. 14 clubs from the JBUs Serie 1, 16 teams from the JBUs Serie 2, 13 clubs from the JBUs Serie 3 and one team from JBUs Serie 4 progressed to the fourth regional round. The four Jutland FA member clubs of the 1963 Kvalifikationsturneringen and all of the clubs from the 1963 Jutland Series entered the cup tournament for the first time.

20 June 1963	Løgstør IF (serie 1)	1–2	Borup FF (serie 2)	Løgstør
	? 75'		? 8?', 87'	Stadium: Løgstør Stadium; Attendance: 200

21 June 1963	Odder I&GF (serie 2)	4–2	Vinding SF (serie 3)	Odder
19:00 CET	Benny Jensen 2?'; Tony Jensen 2?'; Eigil Jensen 80'		? 10', 1h' ? 2h' (o.g.)	Stadium: Odder Stadium

22 June 1963	Trustrup IF (serie 3)	0–5	Vorup Frederiksberg BK (4)	Trustrup
19:30 CET			Jørgen Hansen 15'; Aage Overgaard 1h' Ib Sørensen 1h', 2h' Søren Andreasen 1h' ? 2h'	Stadium: Trustrup Stadium

22 June 1963	Houlbjerg GF (serie 3)	1–4 (a.e.t.)	Auning IF (serie 2)	Houlbjerg
19:00 CET	Knud E. Laursen 2h'		? 1h' ? ?e', ?e', ?e'

23 June 1963	Grenaa IF (serie 1)	2–5	Vejlby-Risskov IK (serie 2)	Grenaa
10:00 CET	Hardy Jørgensen 5' (o.g.); Per Andersen 1h' (o.g.)		Jørgen Kjær 1h', 2h' Tom Simonsen 1h'	Stadium: Grenaa Stadium

22 June 1963	Langaa IK (serie 2)	0–1	IF Fuglebakken (5)	Langå
19:15 CET			Erik Knudsen 70'	Stadium: Langaa Stadium

22 June 1963	Hammerum Herreds SG&IF	2–8	Bjerringbro IF	Hammerum, Herning
	? 2h', 2h'		Elver Knudsen ?h', ?h', ?h' Folmer Padkjær ?h', ?h', ?h' Per Olesen ?h', ?h'	Stadium: Hammerum Stadium

22 June 1963	Aalborg KFUM (serie 2)	1–4	Hobro IK (6)	Aalborg
19:00 CET	Mogens Christensen ?' (pen.)		Ole Elfving ?'; Poul Mark Andersen ?'; Bent Madsen ?'; Arne Christensen ?'	Stadium: KFUMs Bane ved Provstejorden

23 June 1963	Brønderslev IF (5)	1–5	Asaa BK (serie 1)	Brønderslev
13:30 CET	Kaj Pedersen 80'		Claus Nielsen 5'; Ole Mortensen 2?', 2h' Børge Johansen 2h', 8?'	Stadium: Brønderslev Stadium; Attendance: 300

23 June 1963	Øster Brønderslev IF (serie 3)	3–6	Lindholm IF (5)	Øster Brønderslev
14:00 CET	Kurt Pedersen 1h' Lindy Martinsen 1h', 2h'		? 1h', 1h', ?h', ?h', ?h', ?h'	Stadium: Øster Brønderslev Stadium

23 June 1963	Aabybro BK (serie 3)	0–4	Taars-Ugilt IF (6)	Aabybro
			Jens Chr. Nielsen 2?'; Ole Hansen 1h' Frederik Thomsen 51'; Knud Søndergaard Nielsen 5?' (pen.)	Stadium: Aabybro Stadium

23 June 1963	Skagen IK (5)	4–0	Hjørring AIK Frem (serie 2)	Skagen
	Jørgen Bredgaard ?h', ?h' Erik Nielsen ?h' Jens Eggert ?h'		? 1h', 2h', 2h', 2h'

23 June 1963	Kvissel IF (serie 2)	1–3	IK Aalborg Freja (5)	Kvissel
14:00 CET	Vagn Ove Jensen 2?'		Jørgen Toft 1h', 8?'; Jens Larsen 1h'	Stadium: Kvissel Stadium

22 or 23 June 1963	Ulbjerg IF (serie 2)	0–2	Hadsund BK (serie 2)	Ulbjerg
			Ib Christensen 1h' Åge Holst 89' (pen.)

23 June 1963	Aars IK (serie 2)	4–5	IF Frem Skørping (serie 3)	Aars
	Egon Christensen ?h', ?h', ?h' Ove Olesen ?h'		Gunnar Hyldgaard ?h', ?h' Søren Eriksen ?h' Egon Andersen ?h' Benny Jacobsen ?h'	Stadium: Aars Stadium

22 June 1963	Raaby-Dalbyover IF (serie 2)	5–1	IF Vagten Dokkedal (serie 3)	Dalbyover
19:00 CET	Stig Andersen 2?' (pen.); Gunnar Stegger 2h', 2h', 85'; Kaj Pedersen 2h'		? 20'	Stadium: Dalbyover Stadium; Attendance: 400

23 June 1963	Hjørring IF (5)	4–4 (a.e.t.) (4–3 p)	Vejgaard BK (5)	Hjørring
13:30 CET	Juul Hørlycke 20', ?e' Chr. Møller 22'; Svend Aage Jensen ?e'		Kurt Berthelsen 47', 60', 128'; Karl Chr. Kjeldsten ?e'	Stadium: Hjørring Stadium
	Penalties
	?		?

24 June 1963	Ry SK (serie 4)	0–3	Feldborg IF (serie 1)	Ry
			? ?h', ?h', ?h'	Stadium: Ry Stadium

22 June 1963	Vejen SF	2–0	Haderslev FK (JS)	Vejen
	Hans Ove Madsen 1'; Egon Andresen 1h' (pen.)			Stadium: Vejen Stadium

22 June 1963	B 1950 Bolderslev (serie 3)	1–10	Aabenraa BK (JS)	Bolderslev
	? 6?'		Flemming Nissen ?h', ?h', ?h', ?h' Henry Bekke ?h', ?h' Gerhard Strauss ?h', ?h' Jørgen Hansen ?h' Jeff Petersen ?h'	Stadium: Bolderslev Stadium; Referee: A. Severinsen (Bolderslev) (Note: The referee appointed for the match between B 1950 Bolderslev vs Aabenraa BK did not show up, and the two teams decided to let A. Severinsen of Bolderslev be the actual referee of the cup game.)

23 June 1963	Sønderborg BK	7–2	Vamdrup BK	Sønderborg
14:00 CET	Flemming Petersen 1h' Claus Normanni 1h', 2h' Finn Nørgaard 1h' Jørgen Hansen 2h' Finn Christiansen 2h' Uwe Franke 2h'		? 1h', 2h'	Stadium: Sønderborg Stadium; Attendance: 250

23 June 1963	B29 Esbjerg	2–4	Varde GF (serie 1)	Esbjerg
10:00 CET	Per Knudsen 1h' Niels Pedersen 75'		Poul Verner Pedersen 1h', 2h' Poul Erik Thomsen 2h' (pen.); Benny Pedersen 8?'	Stadium: Bane 2, Esbjerg Idrætspark

22 June 1963	Skjern GF (serie 2)	1–4	B47 Esbjerg	Skjern
	? 30' (pen.)		Ole Schlosser 10', 80'; Carl Johan Jensen 50'; Martin Jensen 60'	Stadium: Skjern Stadium

20 June 1963	Bramminge BK (serie 1)	1–2	Esbjerg KFUM (JS)	Bramminge
19:00 CET	Svend Erik Mikkelsen 79'		Erling Enemark 5?'; Svend Stransbjerg 61'	Stadium: Bramminge Stadium

22 June 1963	Vejle FC (serie 1)	2–7	Brande IF (4)	Vejle
19:00 CET	Bent Christensen 2h', 2h'		Ole Fritsen ?h', ?h', 15', 2h' Henning Madsen 47'; Andreas Johansen 2h', 2h'	Stadium: Vestre Stadium

=== Other JBU matches ===
1963	Feldborg IF (6)	7–3	Snejberg (9)

1963	Feldborg IF (6)	4–2	Lind (8)

1963	B 1950 Bolderslev	–	Skelde (serie 4)

1963	B 1950 Bolderslev	–	Rødding (serie 2)

1963	B 1950 Bolderslev	–	Bylderup (serie 4)

=== Fifth JBU qualifying round ===
The 16 fixtures in the fifth and last qualifying round under the Jutland FA were originally scheduled to be played on 30 June 1963. The draw was made after the last match of the fourth qualifying round.

27 June 1963	Brande IF (4)	4–0	B47 Esbjerg (serie 1)	Brande
19:00 CET	Ole Fritsen 37'; Andreas Johansen 75', 7?'; Henning Madsen 2h'			Stadium: Brande Stadium

27 June 1963	Taars-Ugilt IF (6)	1–1 (a.e.t.) (6–5 p)	Lindholm IF (5)	Taars
	Ole Hansen ?e'		Willy Sørensen 1e'	Attendance: 200
	Penalties
	Knud Søndergaard (penalty scored); Ole Thomsen (penalty scored); Simon Mogensen (penalty scored); Niels Frederik Nielsen (penalty missed)		(penalty scored) Poul Birkholm; (penalty scored) Willy Sørensen; (penalty missed) Jørgen Lund; (penalty missed) Holger Hansen

27 June 1963	Feldborg IF (6)	0–3	Silkeborg IF (4)	Feldborg
			Jørgen G. Hansen 5'; John Eriksen 67'; Jørgen Jørgensen 90'

28 June 1963	Vejen SF (serie 1)	2–1	Sønderborg BK (serie 1)	Vejen

29 June 1963	Hadsund BK (serie 2)	2–0	IF Frem Skørping (serie 3)	Hadsund
18:30 CET	Ib Christensen 20' (1h)

29 June 1963	IF Fuglebakken (5)	0–2	Vorup Frederiksberg BK (4)	Vejlby, Aarhus
18:30 CET			Jørgen Hansen 1h' Niels Erik Jensen 88'	Stadium: Riisvangen Stadium

29 June 1963	Varde GF (6)	5–2 (a.e.t.)	Fredericia fF (serie 1)	Varde
19:00 CET	Poul Verner Pedersen 7', 116', 120'; Kurt Søgård 62'; Preben Simonsen 97'		Hans Jørgen Skjødt 1h' Bjarne Nielsen 74'	Stadium: Varde Stadium

30 June 1963	Skagen IK (5)	3–7	Hjørring IF (5)	Skagen
14:00 CET				Stadium: Skagen Stadium

30 June 1963	Asaa BK (serie 1)	2–4 (a.e.t.)	IK Aalborg Freja (5)	Asaa
14:00 CET

30 June 1963	Østerild IF (serie 2)	3–5 (a.e.t.)	Thisted IK (serie 1)
14:00 CET

30 June 1963	Borup FF (serie 2)	7–1	Raaby-Dalbyover IF (serie 2)	Borup ved Låstrup
14:00 CET				Stadium: Borup Stadium

30 June 1963	Bjerringbro IF (serie 2)	5–1	Vejlby Risskov IK (serie 2)	Bjerringbro
14:00 CET				Stadium: Bjerringbro Stadium

30 June 1963	Aabenraa BK (5)	2–3	Esbjerg KFUM (5)	Aabenraa
14:00 CET (Note: The game between Aabenraa BK and Esbjerg KFUM was delayed 3-4 minutes due to the away team's bus experiencing mechanical problems 30 km away from the ground.)	Fritz Jørgensen 17', 2h' Kurt Hoeck 19' (o.g.)		Svend Strandsbjerg 48', 69'	Stadium: Aabenraa Stadium

30 June 1963	Odder I&GF (serie 2)	1–2	Viby IF (5)	Odder
				Stadium: Odder Stadium

1 July 1963	BK Herning Fremad (5)	3–0	Holstebro BK (4)	Herning
	Finn Gustavson 28'; John Bruun 2h' Jørgen Christensen 2h'			Attendance: 1,000

2 July 1963	Hobro IK (6)	3–2	Auning IF (serie 2)	Hobro
				Stadium: Hobro Stadium

== Lolland-Falster FA ==
Three teams, Holeby IF, Nakskov BK and B 1921, would progress to the first round proper from the regional qualifying rounds handled by the Lolland-Falster FA. The draw for the first qualifying round was held on 24 May by the Lolland-Falster FA. The fixtures for the next two rounds were also predetermined by the draw.

=== First LFBU qualifying round ===
The Lolland-Falster FA member club, Nakskov BK, from the 1963 Kvalifikationsturneringen, all seven first senior clubs from the 1963 Lolland-Falster Series and fourteen teams from the 1963 FBUs Mellemrække (all teams from the west and east groups, with the exception of Nørre Alslev BK, participated) entered the cup tournament in the first qualifying round. Two teams, Søllested IF and Rødby BK received a bye to the third qualifying round.

12 June 1963	Errindlev G&IF (6)	v	Vestenskov IF (5)	Errindlev
19:00 CET				Stadium: Errindlev Stadium

12 June 1963	Holeby IF (6)	4–2	Horslunde BK (6)	Holeby
	Arne Rasmussen 1h' (pen.); Povl Christiansen 2h' Niels Jensen 2h' John Nielsen 2h'		? 2h', 2h'

12 June 1963	Nysted BK (6)	v	Toreby-Grænge BK (6)	Nysted
19:00 CET				Stadium: Nysted Stadium

June 1963	Systofte BK (6)	v	Øster Ulslev BK (6)

June 1963	Gedser IF (6)	v	Døllefjelde-Musse IF (6)

12 June 1963	Eskilstrup BK (5)	3–1	Horbelev BK (5)	Eskilstrup
	Keld Larsen 2h', 2h' Kurt Løj 2h'		Paul V. Svej 2h'	Stadium: Eskilstrup Stadium

12 June 1963	Dannemare IF (6)	5–3 (a.e.t.)	BK Velo Nakskov (5)	Dannemare
19:00 CET	Svend Erik Frederiksen 15', 8?', 1e' Willy Hansen 20' (1e)		John Puge 50' (6?); Finn Hansen 5?'	Stadium: Dannemare Stadium

12 June 1963	B 1921 (5)	6–0	Stubbekøbing BK (6)	Nykøbing Falster
19:00 CET	Ole Winther ?h', ?h', ?h' Valdemar Klechewsky ?h', ?h' Børge Chortsen ?h'			Stadium: Nykøbing Falster Idrætspark

12 June 1963	Maribo BK (5)	7–1	Stokkemarke UF (6)	Maribo
19:00 CET	Svend Åge Jensen ?h', ?h', ?h' Flemming Borgen ?h', ?h', ?h'		Jørgen M. Nielsen ?h' ? ?h' (o.g.)	Stadium: Maribo Stadium

12 June 1963	Nakskov BK (4)	8–1	Branderslev IF (6)	Nakskov
19:00 CET	Flemming Rasmussen ?h', ?h' Kurt Engel ?h', ?h' Preben Friis ?h' Jørgen Sørensen ?h' Bent "Sweddie" Jensen ?h' Ib Rasmussen ?h'		? 1h'	Stadium: Nakskov Idrætspark

Søllested IF (6)	bye

Rødby BK (5)	bye

=== Second LFBU qualifying round ===
The majority of the six games in the second qualifying round were played on 19 June, while two games were scheduled for 20 June.

19 June 1963	Dannemare IF (6)	4–2	Rødby BK (5)	Dannemare
19:00 CET	Svend Erik Frederiksen 55'; Kjeld Wagner 60', 2h' Willy Hansen 6?' (pen.)		Jørgen Jensen 1h' Arne Poulsen 1h'	Stadium: Dannemare Idrætspark

19 June 1963	Nakskov BK (4)	2–0	Maribo BK (5)	Nakskov
19:00 CET	Kur Engel 80', 8?'			Stadium: Nakskov Idrætspark; Attendance: Few spectators

19 June 1963	Vestenskov IF (5)	4–1	Søllested IF (6)	Vestenskov
19:00 CET	Willy Milcowski 1h', 2h', 2h' Skjold de la Motte 2h'		Ole Jørgensen 2h'

19 June 1963	Døllefjelde-Musse IF (6)	2–4	Holeby IF (6)	Døllefjelde-Musse
	? 1h', 2h'		? 1h', 2h', 2h', 2h'

20 June 1963	B 1921 (5)	10–0	Systofte BK (6)	Nykøbing Falster
19:00 CET				Stadium: Nykøbing Falster Idrætspark

20 June 1963	Toreby-Grænge BK (6)	4–3 (a.e.t.)	Eskilstrup BK (5)
	Erik Eliassen ?h' Ib Henriksen ?h' Kaj Jensen ?h' Preben Knudsen ?e'		Kjeld Larsen ?h' (pen.); Eigil Hansen ?h' Jens Holger Nielsen ?h'

=== Third LFBU qualifying round ===
The 3 fixtures for the third and last qualifying round, governed by the Lolland-Falster FA, were played on 26 and 27 June 1963.

26 June 1963	Holeby IF (6)	3–1 (a.e.t.)	Toreby-Grænge BK (6)	Holeby
	? 2h' (?e), ?e'		? 2?'

26 June 1963	Vestenskov IF (5)	1–3	Nakskov BK (4)	Vestenskov
19:00 CET	Willy Milcowski 1h'		Flemming Rasmussen 20'; Kurt Engel 2h' Ib Rasmussen 2h'

27 June 1963	Dannemare IF (6)	2–8	B 1921 (5)	Dannemare
19:00 CET	Svend Erik Frederiksen 2h' Villy Hansen 2h'		Preben Nielsen 1h', 1h', 2h', 2h', 2h', 2h', 2h', 2h' Ole Winther 1h' Valdemar Klechewski 1h'	Stadium: Dannemare Idrætspark; Referee: Poul Albrechtsen (Nakskov)

== Zealand FA ==
A total number of 116 teams participated in the qualifying rounds governed by the Zealand FA. Only nine teams will move on to the first round proper, that would be handled by the Danish FA. All the qualifying rounds governed by the Zealand FA were played within the span of a month, from 22 May until 20 June 1963. Clubs playing in the 1963 season of SBUs Serie 1, SBUs Serie 2 and SBUs Serie 3 took part in the initial round. The teams in the SBUs Serie 4 and SBUs Serie 5 did not participate, with teams in SBUs Serie 3 only playing in their own closed cup tournament (SBUs Pokalturnering for serie 4 hold).

=== First SBU qualifying round ===
The draw by the Zealand FA for the fixtures in the first and second qualifying round took place on 20 May 1963. The majority of the 45 matches in the first qualifying round under the auspices of the Zealand FA were played on 23 May 1963, on the same day as the 1963 Danish Cup Final, with four fixtures taking place the day before. A total of 15 teams from these three lower ranking leagues received a bye to the second qualifying round.

22 May 1963	Humlebæk BK (6)	7–2	Helsingør FC (8)	Humlebæk
18:30 CET				Stadium: Humlebæk's bane

22 May 1963	Vridsløselille IF (8)	4–1	BK Avarta (8)

22 May 1963	Høng GF (7)	6–1 (a.e.t.)	Dianalund G&IF (8)	Høng
	? ?h' John Jacobsen 1e', 1e', 105' ? ?e', ?e'		? 1h'

22 May 1963	Tølløse BK (7)	4–2	Ringsted IF (6)

23 May 1963	Søborg BK (6)	3–1	Nivaa GF (7)	Gladsaxe
10:00 CET	? 1h', 2h', 2h'		Hans-Erik Jensen 1h'	Stadium: Gladsaxe Idrætspark

23 May 1963	Fredensborg B&IF (8)	5–1	Ullerød GF (8)	Fredensborg
10:00 CET				Stadium: Fredensborg Stadium

23 May 1963	Taarbæk IF (7)	2–4	Lundtofte BK (8)
11:15 CET

23 May 1963	Søsum-Veksø IF (7)	4–5 (a.e.t.)	Søllerød-Nærum IK (7)	Stenløse
11:15 CET	Jens Christensen 1h', 2h' Carl Hansen 2h', et'		Heinrich Andersen 1h' Alf Larsen 1h', et' Peter Sloth 1h' Viggo Hansen et'	Stadium: Stenløse Stadium

23 May 1963	Kirke Saaby IF Thor (8)	3–1	Roskilde KFUM (7)	Kirke Såby
13:30 CET	? 1h', 1h', 2h'		Erling Poulsen 85'

23 May 1963	Hedehusene IK (6)	5–1	Kornerup-Svogerslev IF (8)	Hedehusene
13:45 CET	Ole Christensen 1h', 2h', 2h' Palle Sloth 2h' Ove Nielsen 2h'		Arne Madsen 1h'

23 May 1963	Viby IF (8)	2–1	Osted BK (8)
11:15 CET	Kjeld Hansen 1h' ? 1h' (o.g.); Carl Christensen 2h'

23 May 1963	Gadstrup IF (8)	5–8	Skensved BK (7)
13:30 CET	? ?h' (o.g.), ?h' (o.g.), ?h', ?h', ?h'		? ?h' (o.g.), ?h' (o.g.), ?h', ?h', ?h', ?h', ?h', ?h'

23 May 1963	Tisvildeleje GF (8)	1–2	Annisse IF (8)	Tisvildeleje
11:15 CET

23 May 1963	Farum IK (8)	1–5	Virum BK (6)	Farum
12:30 CET	Jørgen Angelsø 2h'		? 1h', 1h', 1h', 2h', 2h'	Stadium: Farum Stadium

23 May 1963	Værløse BK (7)	6–3	Slagslunde-Ganløse IF (8)
12:30 CET

23 May 1963	Frederikssund IK (7)	5–0	Skibby IK (8)
13:30 CET

23 May 1963	IF Skjold Skævinge (8)	5–0	Helsinge S&IF (8)	Skævinge
13:30 CET

23 May 1963	IF Frem Hellebæk (8)	2–1	Hornbæk IF (7)
13:30 CET

23 May 1963	Gilleleje BK (8)	0–3	Græsted IF (8)	Gilleleje
13:30 CET				Stadium: Gilleleje Stadium

23 May 1963	Lillerød IF (7)	4–5 (a.e.t.)	Espergærde IF (7)
13:30 CET

23 May 1963	Slangerup og Omegns IF (7)	6–1	Hammersholt BK (8)	Slangerup
13:30 CET

23 May 1963	Snekkersten IF (8)	4–2	Borsholm-Skibstrup IF (7)
13:30 CET

23 May 1963	Sædder G&IF (8)	3–3 (a.e.t.) (7–8 p)	SB 50 Ishøj (8)
10:00 CET	Finn Daggaard ?h' Jørgen Stenkild ?h' Torben Nielsen ?h'		Bruno Eliasen ?h' Søren Jensen ?h' Frants Laustsen ?h'
	Penalties
	?		?

23 May 1963	Hårlev-Himlingøje BK (8)	2–3	Karise IK (8)	Hårlev
09:30 CET	Ole Gude 1h' Erik Rønne 1h'		Kåre Aabengaard 1h' Arne Bartel 2h', 2h'	Stadium: Haarlev Stadium

23 May 1963	Enderslev-Vraaby IF (8)	4–3	Hellested IF (8)
13:30 CET

23 May 1963	Sørbymagle IF (8)	4–0	Boeslunde BK (7)

23 May 1963	Skelskør BK&IF (8)	3–6	Tornemark IF (8)	Skelskør
	n/a 5' n/a 2h', 2h'		Tommy Christensen ?', ?', ?'; Eigil Johnsen ?', ?'; Bent Jørgensen ?'

23 May 1963	Herlufsholm GF (7)	14–1	Menstrup IF (8)
	Ebbe Holm ?', ?', ?', ?'; Jørgen Riisager ?', ?', ?'; Willy Nielsen ?', ?'; John Lupnau ?', ?'; Henrik Johansen ?'; Torben Sørensen ?'; Niels Erik Wimmer ?'

23 May 1963	Hammer GF (7)	3–2	Ørslev IF (8)

23 May 1963	Terslev G&IF (7)	3–8	Faxe BK (7)	Terslev
11:00 CET	Kurt Nielsen 2h' Valdemar Dalum 2h' Evald Andersen 2h'		Per Jensen ?h', ?h', ?h', 2h' Teddy Olsen ?h', ?h', ?h' Tom Jensen ?h'

23 May 1963	Holme Olstrup G&IF (8)	1–2	Fakse Ladeplads IF (7)	Holme-Olstrup
13:30 CET	Henrik Rasmussen 50'		Frank Carlsen 60'; Børge Jørgensen 80'

23 May 1963	Holmegaard Glasværk BK (6)	3–0	Toksværd G&IF (6)	Fensmark
13:30 CET	Teppe Jaakkonen 30'; Bjarne Hansen 43'; Kurt Eriksen 55'			Stadium: Fensmark Stadium; Referee: Carl W. Hansen (Slagelse)

23 May 1963	Haslev IF (6)	5–2	Store Heddinge BK (7)	Haslev
13:30 CET	Kjeld Petersen 40', 52', 67'; Carl Nielsen 85'; Johan Nielsen 88'		Steen Christoffersen 13'; Palle Hansen 20'	Stadium: Haslev Stadium

23 May 1963	Kalvehave IF (8)	4–1	Stege IF (8)	Kalvehave
	? 1h', 1h', 1h', 2h'		Peter Hansen 2h'	Stadium: Kalvehave IFs bane

May 1963	Thorslunde-Ishøj IF (8)	0–4	Brøndbyøster IF (8)

May 1963	Avedøre IF (8)	19–3	IK LK (Lauritz Knudsen) (8)

May 1963	Rørby BK (7)	1–0	Raklev G&IF (8)

May 1963	Tømmerup G&UF (8)	2–1	Ubby U&IF (7)

May 1963	Vig IF (8)	2–3	Nykøbing (Sjælland) IF (7)

May 1963	Asnæs BK (8)	1–5	Rørvig IF (8)

May 1963	Svinninge IF (8)	3–2	Hagested IF (8)

May 1963	Kirke Helsinge IF (8)	5–7	Ruds Vedby IF (8)

May 1963	Stenlille IF (7)	7–3	Hvalsø IF (7)

May 1963	Butterup-Tuse BK (8)	1–8	Nørre Jernløse IF (7)

May 1963	Kundby IF (8)	1–11	Mørkøv IF (7)	Svinninge

=== Second SBU qualifying round ===
The draw by the Zealand FA for the fixtures in the first and second qualifying round also took place on 20 May 1963. All twelve teams from the 1963 Zealand Series and Zealand FA members, Helsingør IF and Kalundborg GF&BK, of the 1963 Kvalifikationsturneringen entered the cup tournament for the first time, with the majority of the 36 fixtures being scheduled for 5 June 1963 (Constitution Day). All clubs from the Zealand Series and Kvalifikationsturneringen played at their home ground, while the other club's fixtures was decided whether the club's first-round games was at home or away, drawing lots if the teams had both won an away or home game in the first round.

1 June 1963	Helsingør IF (4)	11–0	IF Frem Hellebæk (8)	Helsingør
16:00 CET	Erik Olsen 1h', 1h', 1h', ?', ?', ?'; Kurt Nielsen ?', ?', ?', ?'; John Jensen ?'			Stadium: Helsingør Stadium; Attendance: 200; Referee: Carl Frederik Jørgensen (Aarhus)

4 June 1963	Brøndbyvester IF (6)	4–1	Vridsløselille IF (8)

4 June 1963	Taastrup IK (5)	10–1	Skensved BK (7)	Tåstrup

4 June 1963	Nykøbing (Sjælland) IF (7)	7–5 (a.e.t.)	Tømmerup G&UF (8)	Nykøbing Sjælland
18:45 CET				Stadium: Nykøbing Sjælland Stadium

5 June 1963	Humlebæk BK (6)	6–1	Snekkersten IF (8)

5 June 1963	IF Skjold Birkerød (5)	10–1	Slangerup og Omegns IF (7)	Birkerød
18:45 CET				Stadium: Stadion ved Høfdevangen

5 June 1963	Espergærde IF (7)	3–4 (a.e.t.)	Hørsholm-Usserød IK (6)	Espergærde
18:45 CET	Ib Nielsen ?'; Helge Jensen ?'; Paul Petersen ?'		Jan Jensen ?', ?'; Jørgen Søndermølle ?'; Henning Olesen ?'	Stadium: Espergærde Stadium

5 June 1963	Frederiksborg IF (5)	17–0	Fredensborg B&IF (8)	Hillerød
18:45 CET	? 1h', 1h' (1h)			Stadium: Hillerød Stadium

5 June 1963	Græsted IF (8)	2–2 (a.e.t.) (3–2 p)	Frederiksværk IF (7)	Græsted
	Penalties
	?		?

5 June 1963	Annisse IF (8)	3–1	Melby-Liseleje IF (7)	Annisse

5 June 1963	Hundested IF (7)	0–1	IF Skjold Skævinge (8)	Hundested
				Stadium: Hundested Stadium

5 June 1963	Ballerup IF (6)	4–1	Frederikssund IK (7)

5 June 1963	Virum BK (6)	5–4	Værløse BK (7)

5 June 1963	Lundtofte BK (8)	2–3	Søborg BK (6)	Lundtofte

5 June 1963	Søllerød-Nærum IK (7)	1–6	Holte IF (5)	Nærum (Note: The cup match between Søllerød-Nærum IK and Holte IF on 5 June 1963 was originally scheduled to take place in Holte, but was relocated to Søllerød-Nærums Bane.)
				Stadium: Søllerød-Nærums Bane

5 June 1963	Glostrup IC (6)	5–1	Kirke Saaby IF Thor (8)	Glostrup

5 June 1963	Brøndbyøster IF (8)	3–8	Hedehusene IK (6)
	? 1h', 1h', 2h' (pen.)		? 1h', 1h', 1h', 2h', 2h', 2h', 2h', 2h'

5 June 1963	Herlev IF (5)	3–1	Avedøre IF (8)

5 June 1963	SB 50 Ishøj (8)	2–5	Viby IF (8)
	? 1h', 2h'		? 1h', 2h', 2h', 2h', 2h'

5 June 1963	Karise IK (8)	1–5	IF Frem Bjæverskov (7)	Karise
18:45 CET	Leif Skjoldager 2h'		Jørgen Nielsen 1h', 2h', 8?' (pen.); Carsten Nielsen 1h' Børge Thomsen 2h'

5 June 1963	Herfølge BK (6)	5–1	Enderslev-Vraaby IF (8)	Herfølge
18:45 CET	Troels Petersen 2h' Flemming Madsen 2h' Henning Jensen 2h' (pen.); Ebbe Petersen 2h' Ib Johansen 8?'		? 2h'

5 June 1963	Kalundborg GF&BK (4)	5–2	Rørby BK (7)

5 June 1963	Rørvig IF (8)	2–3	Tuse Næs BK (6)

5 June 1963	Svebølle BK&IF (5)	6–4	Svinninge IF (8)

5 June 1963	Korsør BK (5)	4–2	Høng GF (7)	Korsør
				Stadium: Korsør Stadium

5 June 1963	Ruds Vedby IF (8)	4–2	Gørlev IF (6)
	Lennart Christensen 1h', ?h', 2h' Jørgen Olsen ?h'		John Petersen ?h' Poul Erik Christiansen ?h'

5 June 1963	Mørkøv IF (7)	0–3	Knabstrup IF (6)

5 June 1963	Nørre Jernløse IF (7)	0–9	Jyderup SG&IF (7)

5 June 1963	Store Merløse IF (6)	1–2	Tølløse BK (7)	Store Merløse
	Erhard Andersen 30'		Henning Petersen 1h' (pen.); Leo Johansen 62'

5 June 1963	Stenlille IF (7)	5–2	Sørbymagle IF (8)	Stenlille
	Alex Pedersen 2', 2h', 75'; Jørgen Nielsen 2h' Hans Peder Pedersen 2h'		? 12', 35'

5 June 1963	Tornemark IF (8)	2–1	Sorø IF Freja (6)	Tornemark
18:45 CET	? 2h', 2h'		? 1h'

5 June 1963	Slagelse BK&IF (5)	2–1 (a.e.t.)	Herlufsholm GF (7)	Slagelse
18:45 CET	John Jensen 60' ? 122'		Torben Sørensen 75'	Stadium: Slagelse Stadium

5 June 1963	Vordingborg IF (5)	4–0	Hammer GF (7)	Vordingborg
18:45 CET			Svend Hemmingsen 1h', 1h' (pen.), 8?' (pen.); Benny Larsen 48'	Stadium: Vordingborg Stadium

5 June 1963	Faxe BK (7)	1–0	Fakse Ladeplads IF (7)	Faxe
18:45 CET	Teddy Olsen 24'			Stadium: Fakse Stadium; Attendance: 200; Referee: Børge Winther (Næstved)

5 June 1963	Holmegaard Glasværk BK (6)	6–0	Haslev IF (6)	Fensmark
18:45 CET	Bent Hansen 2', 88'; Teppo Jaakkonen 5'; Benny Bonnesen 20'; Ib Vestervig 75', 85'			Stadium: Fensmark Stadium

5 June 1963	Lendemark BK (5)	11–2	Kalvehave IF (8)
18:45 CET	Hans Erik Hansen ?', ?', ?', ?', ?'; Finn Pedersen ?', ?'; Jørgen Hansen ?', ?'; Frank Jensen ?'; Søren Egelund ?'		Johny Søgaard 1h' (2h)

=== Third SBU qualifying round ===
The majority of the 18 fixtures were scheduled for 13 June 1963.

12 June 1963	Humlebæk BK (6)	0–5	Helsingør IF (4)	Humlebæk
18:45 CET			Kurt Nielsen ?', ?'; Erik Olsen ?', ?'; Jens Ole Jensen ?'

12 June 1963	Hørsholm-Usserød IK (6)	1–1 (a.e.t.) (4–3 p)	IF Skjold Birkerød (5)
18:45 CET

12 June 1963	Frederiksborg IF (5)	9–0	Græsted IF (8)
18:45 CET

12 June 1963	IF Skjold Skævinge (8)	2–1	Annisse IF (8)
18:45 CET

12 June 1963	Ballerup IF (6)	9–1	Virum BK (6)
18:45 CET

12 June 1963	Søborg BK (6)	1–0	Holte IF (5)	Gladsaxe
18:45 CET				Stadium: Gladsaxe Idrætspark

12 June 1963	Hedehusene IK (6)	3–4	Glostrup IC (6)
18:45 CET

12 June 1963	Brøndbyvester IF (6)	2–4 (a.e.t.)	Herlev IF (5)
18:45 CET

12 June 1963	Taastrup IK (5)	6–0	Viby IF (8)
18:45 CET

12 June 1963	IF Frem Bjæverskov (7)	1–8	Herfølge BK (6)
18:45 CET

12 June 1963	Nykøbing (Sjælland) IF (7)	2–4	Kalundborg GF&BK (4)	Nykøbing Sjælland
18:45 CET

12 June 1963	Tuse Næs BK (6)	1–8	Svebølle BK&IF (5)
18:45 CET

12 June 1963	Korsør BK (5)	5–1	Ruds Vedby IF (8)
18:45 CET

12 June 1963	Knabstrup IF (6)	3–1	Jyderup SG&IF (7)	Knabstrup
19:00 CET

12 June 1963	Tølløse BK (7)	1–3	Stenlille IF (7)
18:45 CET

12 June 1963	Tornemark IF (8)	1–2	Slagelse BK&IF (5)
18:45 CET

12 June 1963	Faxe BK (7)	1–5	Vordingborg IF (5)
18:45 CET

12 June 1963	Holmegaard Glasværk BK (6)	4–2 (a.e.t.)	Lendemark BK (5)
18:45 CET

=== Fourth SBU qualifying round ===
The 9 fixtures were played on 19 and 20 June 1963.

19 June 1963	Knabstrup IF (6)	4–1	Korsør BK (5)
18:45 CET

19 June 1963	Helsingør IF (4)	10–0	Hørsholm-Usserød IK (6)
18:45 CET	Kurt Nielsen ?', ?', ?', ?'; John Jensen ?', ?', ?'; Erik Olsen ?', ?'; Jørgen Jensen ?' (pen.)

19 June 1963	IF Skjold Skævinge (8)	0–5	Frederiksborg IF (5)
18:45 CET

19 June 1963	Søborg BK (6)	3–2	Ballerup IF (6)
18:45 CET

19 June 1963	Herfølge BK (6)	2–5	Taastrup IK (5)
18:45 CET

19 June 1963	Svebølle BK&IF (5)	1–5	Kalundborg GF&BK (4)
18:45 CET

19 June 1963	Slagelse BK&IF (5)	3–1	Stenlille IF (7)
18:45 CET

19 June 1963	Vordingborg IF (5)	2–1	Holmegaard Glasværk BK (6)
18:45 CET

20 June 1963	Herlev IF (5)	2–3	Glostrup IC (6)	Herlev
18:45 CET

== Competition proper ==
Winners from each of the last qualifying rounds of the six regions advance to First Round Proper, where clubs from level 3 of Danish football, the Danmarksturneringens 3. division, first enter the competition.
