= 2021 Aabenraa municipal election =

← 2017	16 November 2021	2025 →

All 31 seats to the Aabenraa Municipal Council 16 seats needed for a majority
- Turnout: 31,175 (66.5%) ▼5.2%
	First party	Second party	Third party
	V	A	C
Party	Venstre	Social Democrats	Conservatives
Last election	11 seats, 33.5%	9 seats, 29.0%	2 seats, 4.9%
Seats won	11	9	4
Seat change	0	0	▲2
Popular vote	10,250	8,678	3,544
Percentage	33.4%	28.3%	11.6%
Swing	▼0.1%	▼0.7%	▲6.7%
	Fourth party	Fifth party	Sixth party
	S	D	O
Party	Schleswig Party	New Right	Danish People's Party
Last election	2 seats, 6.1%	0 seats, 2.1%	5 seats, 14.4%
Seats won	2	2	2
Seat change	0	▲2	▼3
Popular vote	2,257	2,045	1,796
Percentage	7.4%	6.7%	5.9%
Swing	▲1.3%	▲4.6%	▼8.5%
	Seventh party	Eighth party
	F	Ø
Party	Green Left	Red–Green Alliance
Last election	1 seat, 2.3%	1 seat, 3.0%
Seats won	1	0
Seat change	0	▼1
Popular vote	997	523
Percentage	3.2%	1.7%
Swing	▲0.9%	▼1.3%
Mayor before election
Thomas Andersen
Venstre
Mayor after election
Jan Riber Jakobsen
Conservatives

Since 2014, Thomas Andersen from Venstre had been mayor of Aabenraa Municipality. He would stand to be re-elected. Venstre became the biggest party for the third election in a row, and kept 11 seats. After the election, the Conservatives and New Right, who both gained 2 seats, attempted to find a majority outside of Venstre. As time passed, the Social Democrats, the Green Left and Schleswig Party would join in, while Danish People's Party chose to stand out. An agreement, consisting of parties along the political spectrum, was reached between the Social Democrats, the Conservatives, the Green Left and New Right, which would see Jan Riber Jakobsen from the Conservatives become mayor, despite the party only winning 11.6% of the vote.

This would mark the first time since the 2007 municipal reform, that a municipality in the South Jutland constituency would have a mayor from the Conservatives. It was one of three municipalities in the constituency where the Conservatives had mayor's elected in the 2021

== Electoral system ==
For elections to Danish municipalities, a number varying from 9 to 31 are chosen to be elected to the municipal council. The seats are then allocated using the D'Hondt method and a closed list proportional representation. Aabenraa Municipality had 31 seats in 2021

Unlike in Danish General Elections, in elections to municipal councils, electoral alliances are allowed.

== Electoral alliances ==
=== Electoral Alliance 1 ===
Party		Political alignment
C	Conservatives	Centre-right
D	New Right	Right-wing to Far-right
I	Liberal Alliance	Centre-right to Right-wing

=== Electoral Alliance 2 ===
Party		Political alignment
F	Green Left	Centre-left to Left-wing
Ø	Red–Green Alliance	Left-wing to Far-Left

=== Electoral Alliance 3 ===
Party		Political alignment
K	Christian Democrats	Centre to Centre-right
S	Schleswig Party	Centre (Regionalism)
Å	The Alternative	Centre-left to Left-wing

=== Electoral Alliance 4 ===
Party		Political alignment
O	Danish People's Party	Right-wing to Far-right
V	Venstre	Centre-right

== Results by polling station ==
Division	A	C	D	F	I	K	O	S	V	Ø	Å
Division	%	%	%	%	%	%	%	%	%	%	%
Hovslund	24.0	11.6	8.7	1.9	0.7	0.2	9.2	3.6	38.5	1.2	0.2
Hellevad	26.1	7.0	9.8	1.1	0.6	1.5	6.4	3.4	41.6	1.9	0.6
Rødekro	33.0	14.1	6.0	1.8	0.7	0.9	6.9	3.2	32.1	1.0	0.2
Løjt	31.5	9.1	6.2	4.2	1.3	0.7	5.1	4.0	35.7	1.7	0.4
Ensted	28.3	19.9	6.1	3.5	0.7	0.8	4.0	3.9	30.6	1.6	0.6
Bolderslev	22.8	9.1	8.8	1.3	0.6	0.7	6.7	10.5	37.7	1.2	0.4
Ravsted	11.6	6.1	9.5	0.8	1.3	0.2	4.0	13.1	51.1	1.5	0.8
Hjordkær	30.4	8.5	7.8	1.5	0.2	1.7	22.1	2.2	25.2	0.1	0.4
Felsted	23.1	12.0	8.2	3.0	0.6	0.2	5.1	5.0	41.6	0.8	0.5
Varnæs	28.8	5.7	7.7	3.9	0.3	0.7	3.9	2.5	42.6	3.5	0.4
Bylderup	12.9	6.1	6.9	2.0	0.2	2.8	5.2	32.5	30.1	0.9	0.6
Tinglev	19.4	8.0	8.5	2.8	0.3	0.6	4.9	17.8	36.2	1.3	0.4
Aabenraa Midt	33.3	11.3	4.9	4.8	0.4	0.8	4.1	6.2	31.0	2.6	0.6
Padborg	23.8	19.8	6.3	3.1	0.3	0.3	5.7	9.0	29.3	2.1	0.3
Kliplev	16.6	11.4	8.2	2.4	0.5	0.3	5.9	5.7	47.1	1.5	0.4
Kruså	19.2	15.4	9.3	3.6	0.5	0.2	5.0	8.8	35.7	1.3	1.0
Aabenraa Syd	39.1	8.4	4.3	4.0	0.4	0.7	4.7	4.2	31.1	2.2	1.0
Aabenraa Nord	44.3	7.7	6.1	5.1	0.7	0.5	5.9	4.1	22.7	2.7	0.4

== Results ==
Party		Votes	%	+/-	Seats	+/-
Aabenraa Municipality
V	Venstre	10,250	33.44	-0.06	11	0
A	Social Democrats	8,678	28.31	-0.65	9	0
C	Conservatives	3,544	11.56	+6.70	4	+2
S	Schleswig Party	2,257	7.36	+1.26	2	0
D	New Right	2,045	6.67	+4.56	2	+2
O	Danish People's Party	1,796	5.86	-8.57	2	-3
F	Green Left	997	3.25	+0.96	1	0
Ø	Red-Green Alliance	523	1.71	-1.28	0	-1
K	Christian Democrats	232	0.76	+0.57	0	0
I	Liberal Alliance	173	0.56	-1.07	0	0
Å	The Alternative	160	0.52	-0.31	0	0
Total		30,655	100	N/A	31	N/A
Invalid votes		138	0.29	-0.02		
Blank votes		382	0.82	-0.20		
Turnout		31,175	66.54	-4.15		
Source: valg.dk
