= Hjordkær Parish =

Parish in Aabenraa Municipality, Denmark

Hjordkær Parish Hjordkær Sogn
- Parish
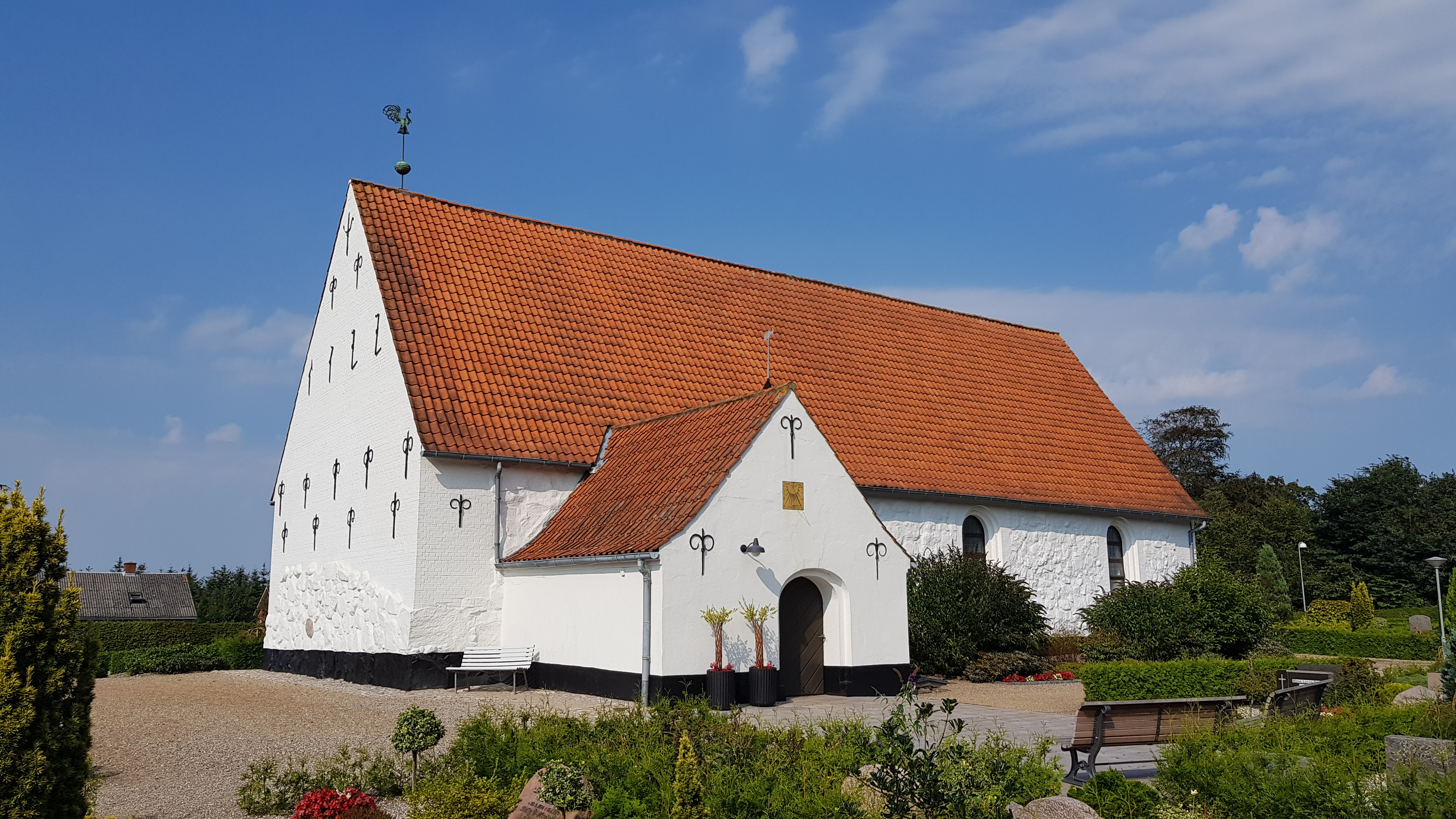
- Hjordkær Church

- The parish within Aabenraa Municipality
- Coordinates: 55°01′58″N 9°18′11″E
- Country: Denmark
- Region: Southern Denmark
- Municipality: Aabenraa Municipality
- Diocese: Haderslev

Population (2025)
  - Total: 1,951
- Parish number: 9011

Hjordkær Parish (Danish: Hjordkær Sogn) is a parish in the Diocese of Haderslev in Aabenraa Municipality, Denmark. Hjordkær Church is located in the village of Hjordkær.
