= Kohberg Bakery Group =

Danish food company

- Company type: Fully owned Aktieselskab
- Industry: Food and Beverage
- Founded: 2002
- Headquarters: Bolderslev, Denmark
- Area served: Denmark, Europe
- Products: Bread and cakes, bake-off products
- Owner: Koff A/S
- Website: www.kohberg.dk

Kohberg Bakery Group is a Danish food producing company that makes bread and cakes. The company is fully owned by Koff, a family-owned holding company based in Aabenraa.

== History ==
The company was founded by Alfred Kohberg in the small town of Rødekro in 1969. The bakery which at that time exclusively produced rye bread grew rapidly and moved to Bolderslev. In 1989 the company was sold to Inga and Preben Fogtmann who later founded the holding company Koff A/S. In 1992 Kohberg bought a 60 percent stake in HC Andersen Bagergården A/S in Haderslev, and in 2006 took over the remaining 40 percent. In 1995 Kohberg acquired Trianon in Taastrup. Today the factory in Taastrup is responsible for the production of Kohberg wheat bread.

== Product range ==
Kohberg produces a wide range of breads and cakes. It also produces bake-off products Danish pastry for the retail and catering industry. Friends of the Earth Europe reported in 2013 that Kohberg bakeries no longer accept glyphosate treated grain.
