= Bolderslev =

Town in Southern Denmark

Bolderslev Bollersleben (German)
- Town
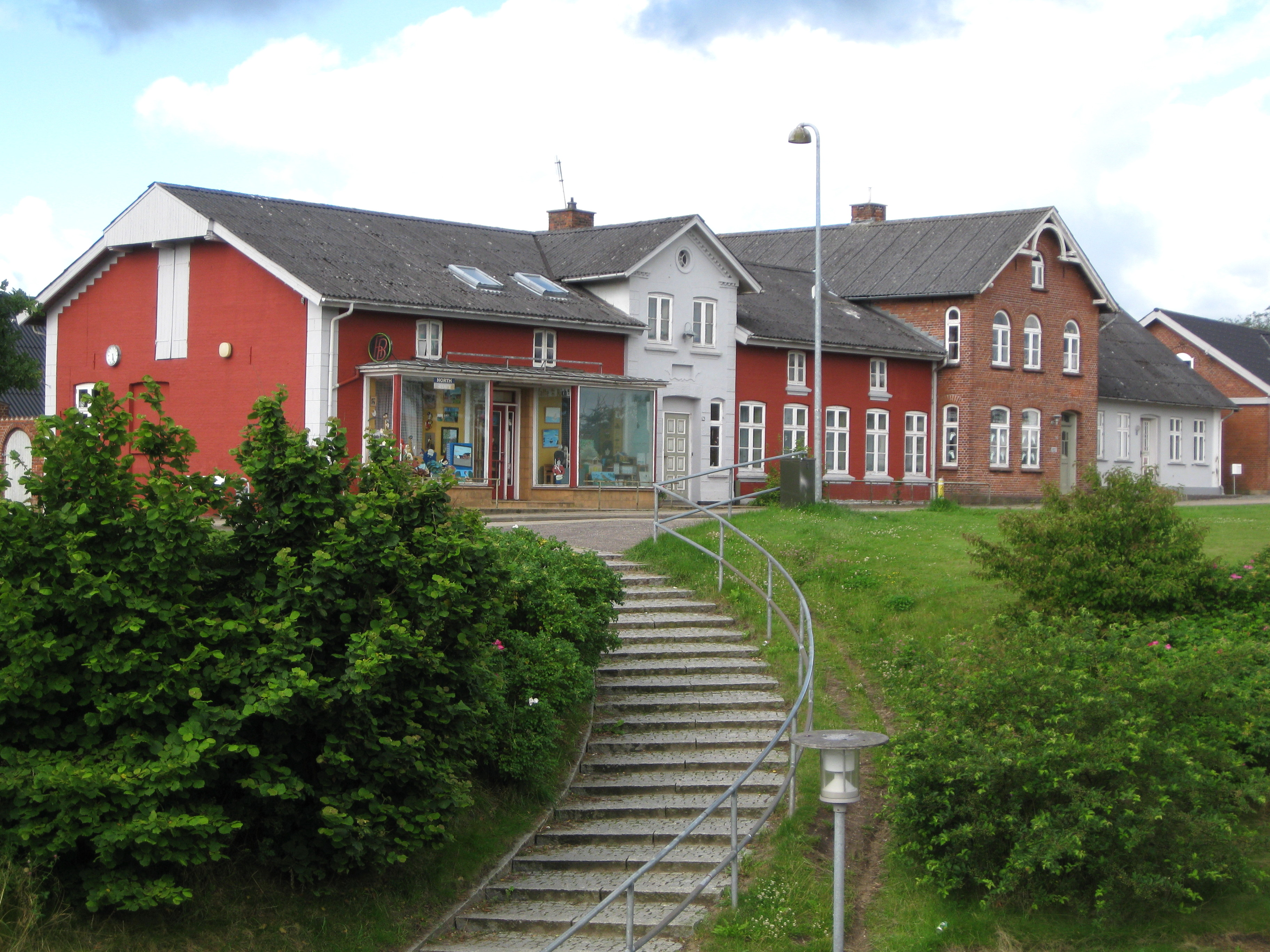

- Location in Denmark Bolderslev (Region of Southern Denmark)
- Coordinates: 54°59′24″N 9°16′45″E
- Country: Denmark
- Region: Southern Denmark
- Municipality: Aabenraa

Area
  - Urban: 1.4 km^{2} (0.54 sq mi)

Population (2026)
  - Urban: 1,132
  - Urban density: 810/km^{2} (2,100/sq mi)
- Time zone: UTC+1 (CET)
  - Summer (DST): UTC+2 (CEST)
- Postal code: DK-6392 Bolderslev
- Website: www.bolderslevby.dk

Bolderslev (German: Bollersleben) is a town in Aabenraa Municipality, within the Region of Southern Denmark. It had a population of 1,132 as of 1 January, 2026. It is the main town in Bjolderup Parish.

Bolderslev is located 7 kilometers away from Tinglev, 7 kilometers from Hjordkær, 12 kilometers from Aabenraa, and 23 kilometers from Padborg.

Bolderslev was previously a railway town on the East Jutland Line between Tinglev and Rødekro, but the railway station has now been closed and demolished. The double-track railway and heavily used Hellevad-Bov road divide the town into three smaller parts. A few kilometers southeast of Bolderslev is the memorial for the old South Jutland courthouse Urnehoved, and south of the town are 18 burial mounds from ancient times, of which Toppehøj and Bredhøj are among the largest. Three kilometers west of Bolderslev is the Bjolderup Church of the Bjolderup Parish.

The headquarters of Kohberg Bakery Group is located in the town.
