= Vestenskov =

- Village
- The location of Vestenskov in Denmark
- Coordinates: 54°47′22″N 11°05′38″E
- Country: Denmark
- Region: Region Zealand
- Municipality: Lolland Municipality

Population (2020)
  - Total: 430
- Time zone: UTC+1 (CET)
  - Summer (DST): UTC+2 (CEST)
- Postal codes: 7628

Vestenskov is a village located in the Lolland Municipality, in the Region Zealand of Denmark.
