= Aarsballe =

- Village
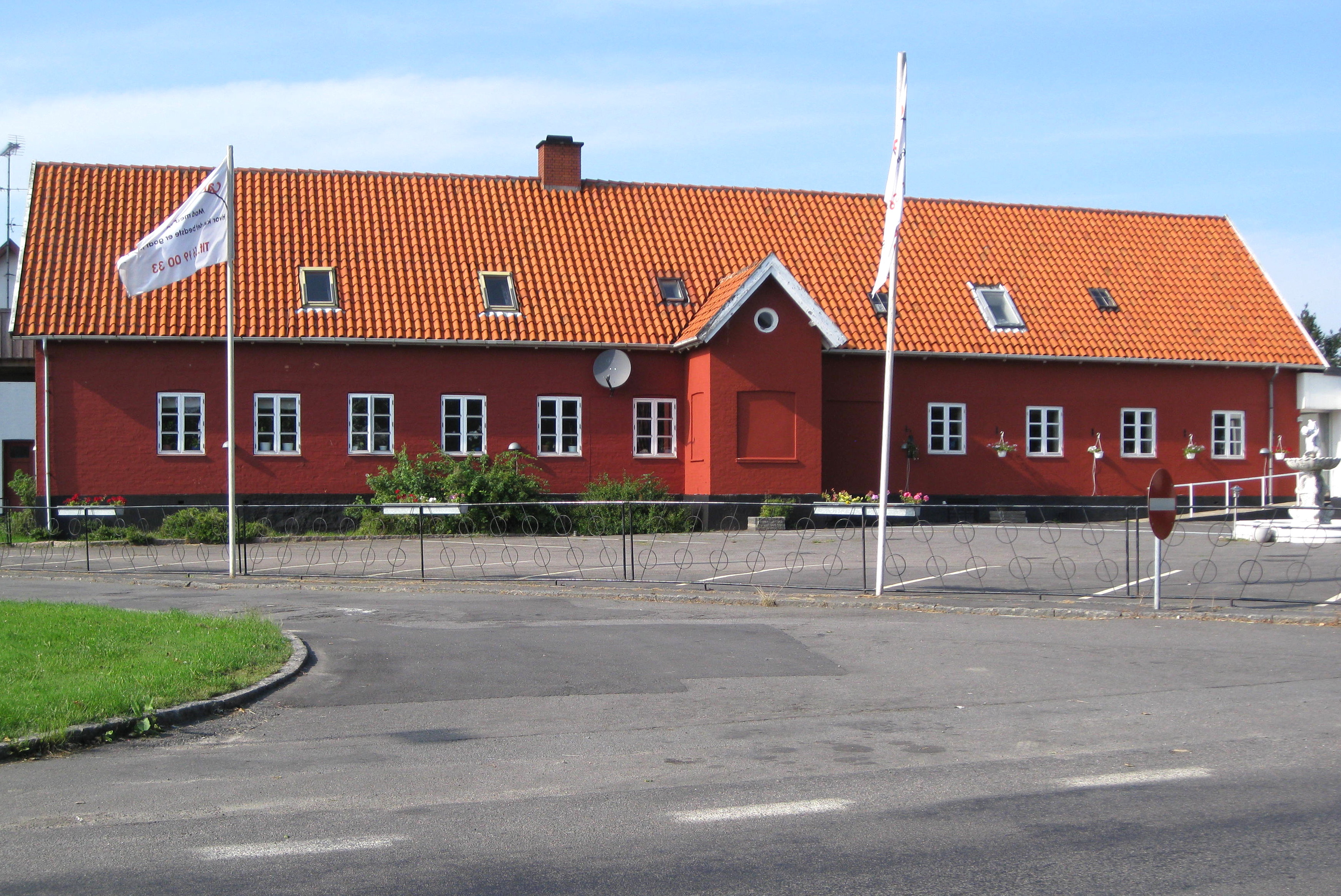
- Restaurant

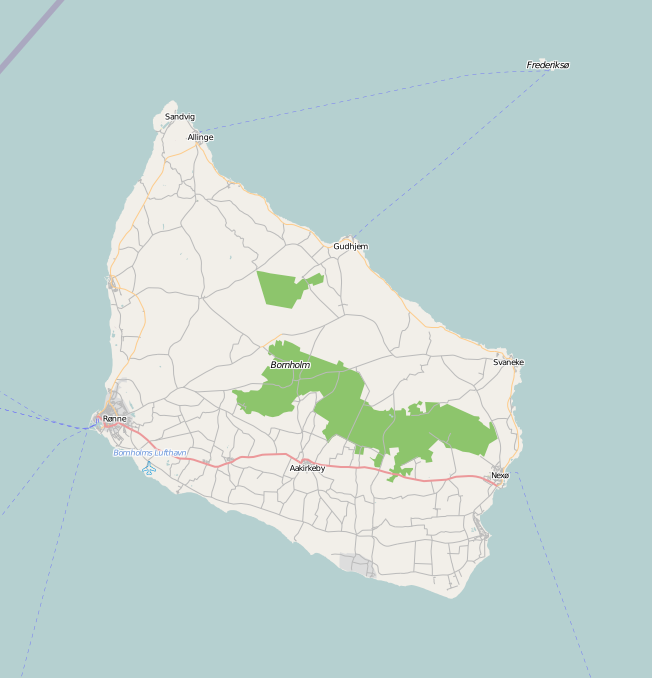
- Location on Bornholm
- Coordinates: 55°08′40″N 14°52′10″E
- Country: Denmark
- Region: Capital (Hovedstaden)
- Municipality: Bornholm

Population (2009)
  - Total: 86
- Time zone: UTC+1 (CET)
  - Summer (DST): UTC+2 (CEST)

Aarsballe (Danish: Årsballe) is a village located in the centre of the Danish island of Bornholm. It is at a crossroads formed by the main road from Rønne to Østerlars and a secondary road from Aakirkeby to Klemensker. As of 2009, it has a population of 86.

== History ==
Aarsballe developed as a result of the crossroads which formed a natural meeting point for horsedrawn traffic. Initially, activities developed in and around the farms of Aarsballegård and Træbenegård.

== Description ==
Most of the village lies to the north of the main road with fine views over the woods of Nyker Plantage and Almindingen. It lies 118 metres (387 ft) above sea level which explains the presence of television transmitters for Danmarks Radio (150 m high) and TV2 (315.5 m). Årsballe has various businesses including an agricultural machinery dealer, a timber store and a radio and television shop.

The village once had an active business community but as opportunities developed for services developed elsewhere, many of Aarsballe's businesses closed. Restaurant Bolsterbjerg is located just outside the village. Aarsballe Boldklub offers a wide variety of sporting activities.
