= Hjordkær =

Hjordkær Jordkirch (German)
- Town
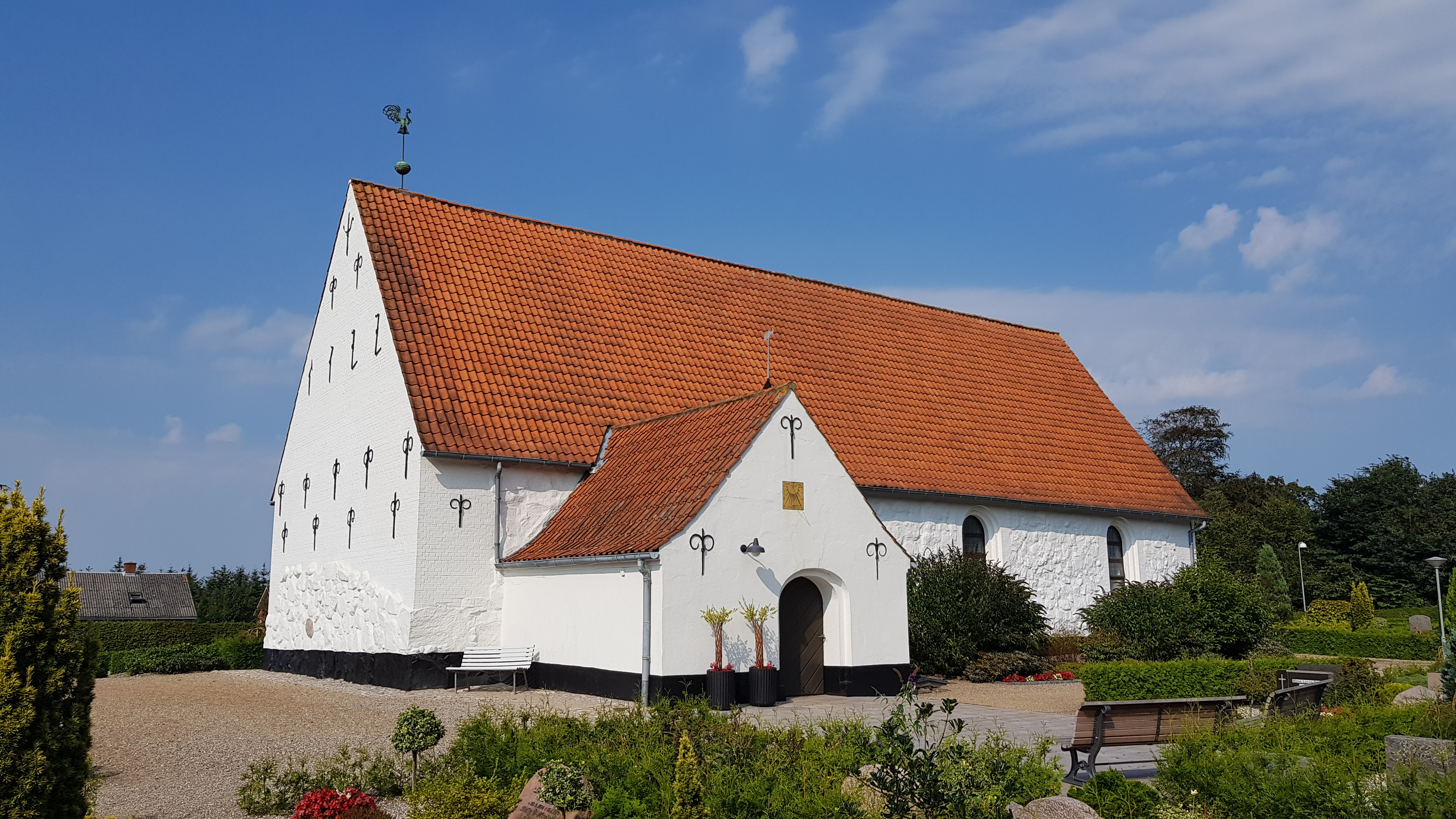
- Hjordkær Church

- Location in Denmark Hjordkær (Region of Southern Denmark)
- Coordinates: 55°1′38″N 9°18′22″E
- Country: Denmark
- Region: Southern Denmark
- Municipality: Aabenraa Municipality
- Parish: Hjordkær Parish

Area
  - Urban: 1.69 km^{2} (0.65 sq mi)

Population (2026)
  - Urban: 1,620
  - Urban density: 959/km^{2} (2,480/sq mi)
  - Gender: 809 males and 811 females
- Time zone: UTC+1 (CET)
  - Summer (DST): UTC+2 (CEST)
- Postal code: DK-6230 Rødekro

Hjordkær (German: Jordkirch) is a town in Hjordkær Parish, Aabenraa Municipality, Region of Southern Denmark in Denmark. It is located 9 km west of Aabenraa and 7 km south of Rødekro and has a population of 1,620 (1 January 2026).

Hjulgraven i Hjordkær (The Wheel-grave in Hjordkær) is a late neolithic wheel-grave located on the eastern outskirts of the town.
