= List of county governors of Frederiksborg =

This list of county governors of Frederiksborg lists county governors (Danish: Amtmænd, singular Amtmand) of Frederiksborg County, Denmark.

== List ==
Portrait	Name	Term	Notes
	Otto Pogwisch	1648—1665	
	Helmuth Otto von Winterfeldt	1667—1679	
	Joachim Christopher von Bülow	1679—1889	
	Eggert Christopher von Knuth	1690—1697	
	Johan Otto Raben	1697—1717	
	Valentin von Eickstedt	17117—1718	
	Friedrich von Gram	1718—1741	
	Friedrich Carl von Gram	1741—1771	
	Heinrich Levetzau	1771—1805	
	Hans Nicolai Arctander	1805—1826	
	Herman Gerhard Treschow	1826—1836	
	Hans Schack Knuth	1836—1855	
	Carl Eduard Rotwitt	1855—1860	
	Johan Sigismund Schulin	1860—1880	
	Vilhelm Wedell-Wedellsborg	1880—1906	
	Vilhelm Peter Schulin	1906—1921	
	Harry Rowland Howard Grøn	1921—1931	
	Waldemar Oxholm	1931—1939	
	Kay Ulrich	1939-1948	
	Justus Saurbrey	1938-1964	
	Jørgen Elkjær-Larsen	1964-1869	

== See also ==
- List of county governors of Bornholm
- List of county governors of Copenhagen
- List of county governors of Holbæk
- List of county governors of Soræ
- List of county governors of Nykøbing
