= Valentin von Eickstedt =

Danish military officer and government official

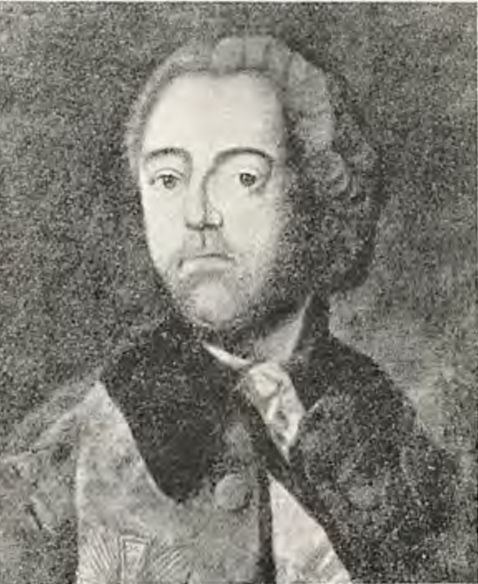
Valentin von Eickstedt.

Valentin von Eickstedt (13 December 1669 –17 September 1718) was a Danish army officer and government official.

== Early life ==
Eickstedt was born on 13 December 1669 at Hohenholz in Swedish Pomerania, the son of Alexander Ernst von Eickstedt (1634–93) and Dorothea Sophie von Suckow (died latest 1684). After his mother's death, Eickstedt's father married Marie Sophie von Normann (c. 1653–1724).

== Career ==
Eickstedt became a fendrik in the Royal Danish Army in 1684. He became a junior lieutenant in 1685, a captain in 1688, and a major in 1693. In 1692 and 1696, he took part in military campaigns abroad. 1697, he was promoted to lieutenant colonel. In 1700, he took part in the Siege of Tönning. In 1701, he was promoted to colonel and the head of a national regiment. Later in the same year, he was put in charge of the newly established grenadier corps. In 1704, now with title of chamberlain, he was appointed adjudant general for the king. He was subsequently promoted to Brigadier in 1706 and major general in 1708. In 1709–10, during the Great Northern War, he took part in the Scanian campaign. In a letter to the king, general Christian Detlev Reventlow described him as a good and honest man, but an extremely poor military leader. After the Battle of Helsingborg, in which he commanded the foot soldiers, he was replaced by Franz Joachim von Dewitz.

In May 1710, Eickstedt replaced Christian von Lente as Chief Secretary of War ('overkrigssekretær) and member of the Generalkommissariatet and was awarded the title of Gehejmeråd. He left the post in 1717. In the same year, he was appointed county governor of Frederiksborg County.

== Personal life ==
Eickstedt was married twice. His first wife, Elisabeth von der Osten, died on 4 June 1708. He subsequently was remarried to Edele Cathrine Kaas (1679–1742), the daughter of overkommissarius Hans Kaas of Hastrup (c. 1640–1700) and Sophie Amalie Bielke (1650–1703).

Eickstedt died on 17 September 1718 at Frederiksborg Castle. He is buried in St. Peter's Church in Copenhagen. His widow married in 1721 to vice admiral Caspar Wessel (1693–1768).

Civic offices
Preceded by Johan Otto Raben	County Governor of Frederiksborg County; 1697–1741	Succeeded by Friedrich von Gram
