= Kokkedal Slot Copenhagen =

Manor house in northeast Zealand, Denmark

Coordinates: 55.9025°N 12.5194°E

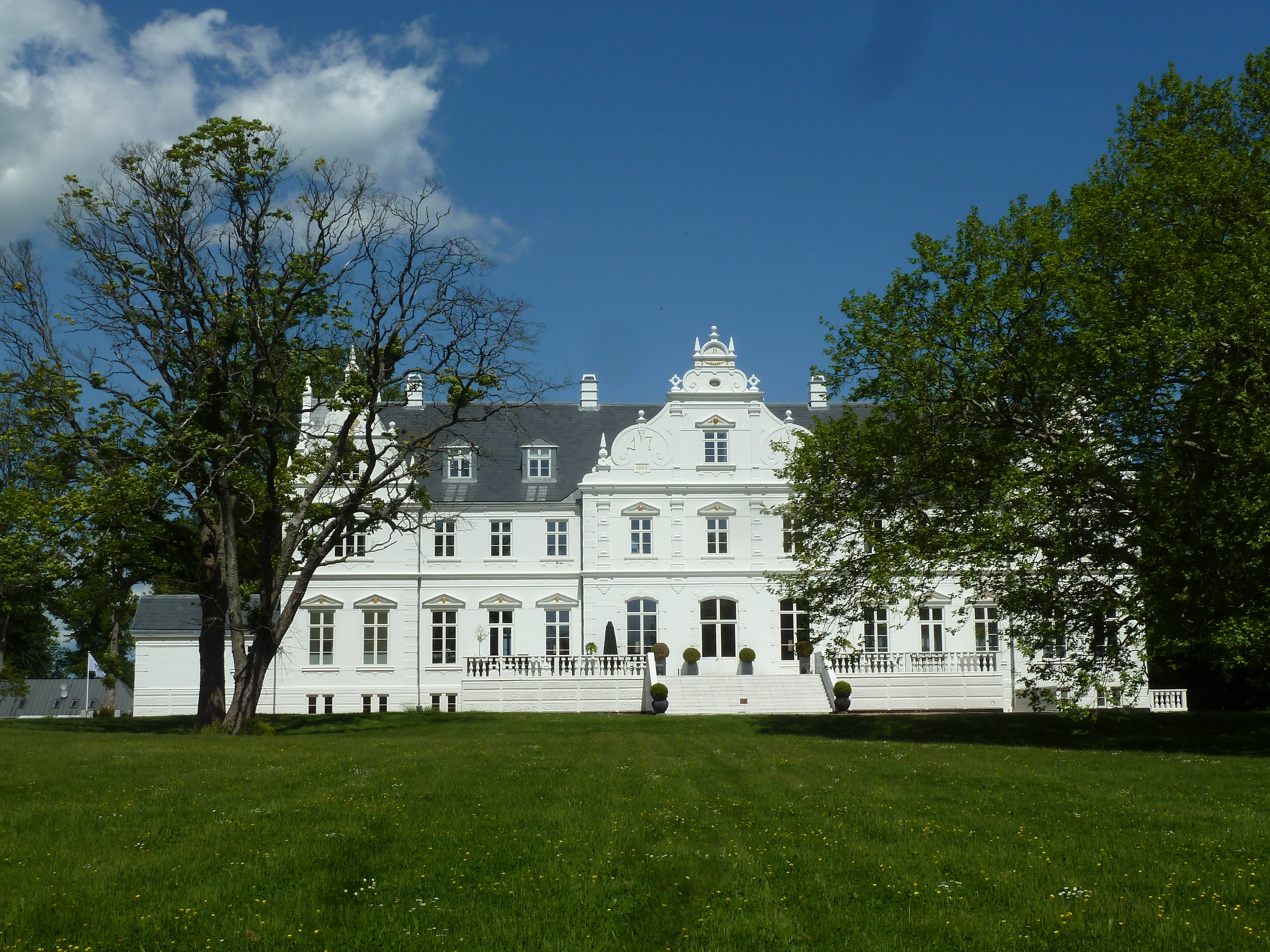
- Kokkedal Slot viewed from the garden
- Interactive map of the Kokkedal Slot Copenhagen area

General information
- Location: Hørsholm, Denmark
- Opening: 2004; 22 years ago
- Owner: Mikael Goldschmidt Holding

Other information
- Number of rooms: 62
- Number of restaurants: 1

Website
- Official website

Kokkedal Slot (English: Kokkedal House) is a former country house located in Hørsholm north of Copenhagen, Denmark. It is now operated as a 62-room, high-end hotel under the name Kokkedal Slot Copenhagen to distinguish it from Kokkedal Slot in North Jutland. The hotel is a member of the Small Luxury Hotels of the World (SHL) network. It is surrounded by parkland and an 18-hole golf course.

== History ==
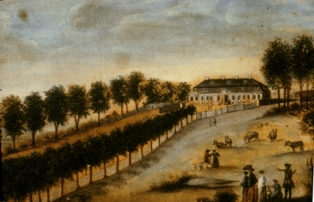
Landhaus Cockedahl in the 1750s

The estate was originally a tenant farm under Hirschholm Palace. In 1746, Queen Sophie Magdalene ceded it to Christian August von Berckentin, a German count in Danish service. He commissioned Johann Gottfried Rosenberg to build a summer retreat at the site, a one-storey house with a Mansard roof, which he referred to as Landhaus Cockedahl. Between 1751 and 1755, Rosenborg also constructed a new town mansion for Berckentin on Bredgade. That building is now known as the Odd Fellows Mansion.

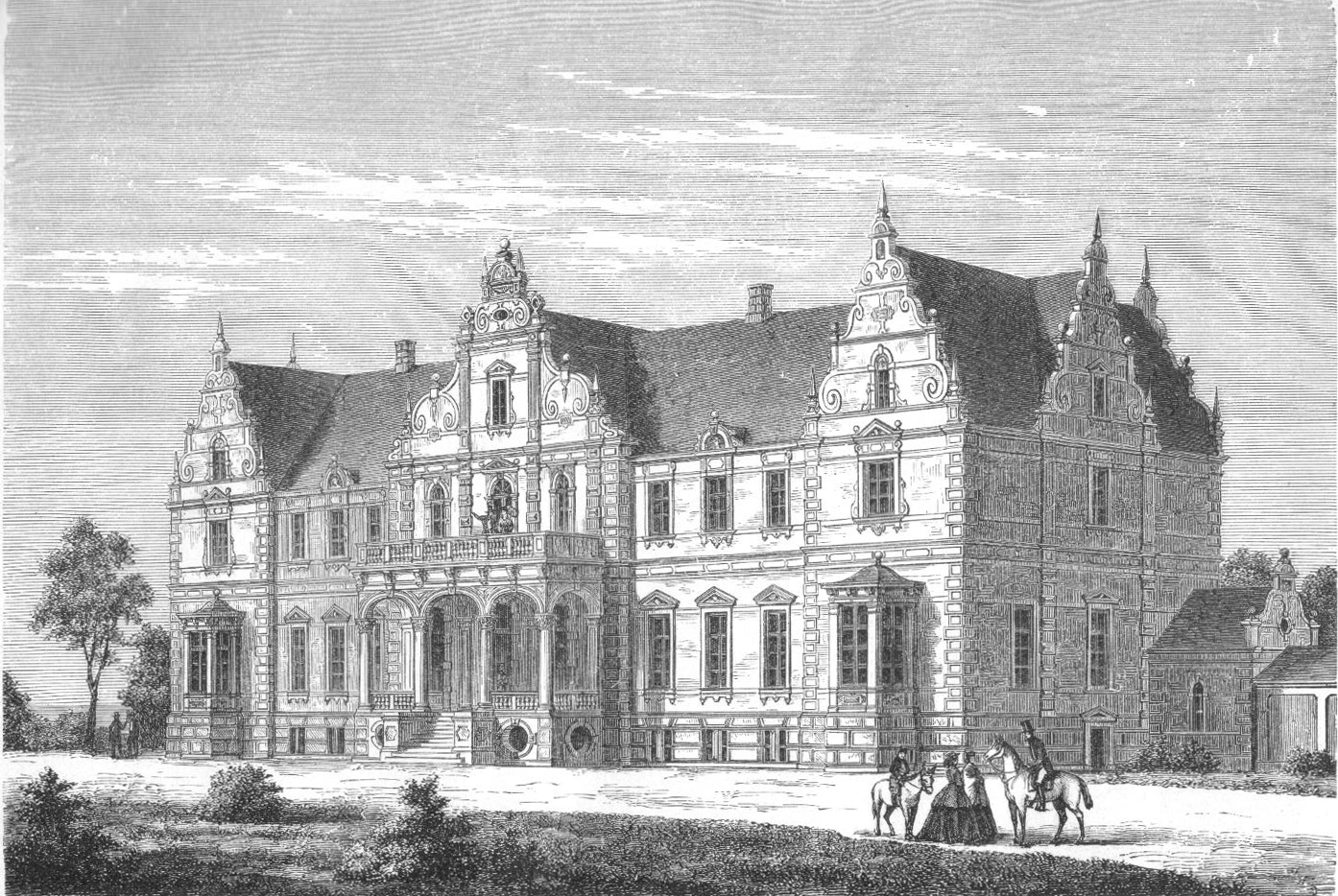
Kokkedal Slot in c. 1895

The property changed hands numerous times before it was purchased by Frederik Horsens Block in 1864. He had recently returned from Hong Kong where he had led the company John Burd & Co and been Danish consul since 1855. He demolished the main building in 1865 and replaced it with a larger, two-story building which was completed in 1866 to a design by C. V. Nielsen. The new complex also comprised stables and other farm buildings.

In 1963, Hørsholm Municipality acquired the estate from Peter Møller Christensen, founder of Fahls Varehus in Copenhagen. In 1993, Hørsholm Municipality sold the property to a private investor on condition that it be converted into a hotel and restaurant. The plans were not realized and the house fell into despair. In 2003, a lawsuit returned the property to Hørsholm Municipality. Keops Development acquired the estate in 2005 but sold it again to the construction company Kjær & Lassen A/S. They completed a renovation of the building in 2010. It was purchased by Mikael Goldschmidt in February 2014.

== Hotel ==
The hotel is owned by M. Goldschmidt Holding. It is a member of Small Luxury Hotels. It has 62 rooms and a restaurant. The hotel manager is Michael Telling.

== Cultural references ==
Kokkedal Slot is used as a location in Bille August's 1983 coming-of-age film Zappa.

== List of owners ==
- (1730–1746) Sophie Magdalene of Brandenburg-Kulmbach
- (1746–1758) Christian August von Berckentin
- (1758–1768) Louise Scheel von Plessen, née Berckentin
- (1768–1771) Christian Ludvig Scheel-Plessen
- (1771–1799) Heinrich von Levetzow
- (1799–1806) Ernst Frederik von Walterstorff
- (1806–1810) Haagen Christian Astrup
- (1810–1813) Ulrik Christian von Schmidten
- (1813–1829) Isaacs Benners
- (1829–1837) John Brown
- (1837–1843) Andreas Nicolai Hansen
- (1843–1864) Malthe Bruun Nyegaard
- (1864–1892) Frederik H. Block
- (1892–1897) Enkefru Block
- (1897–1902) Enkefru Blocks dødsbo
- (1902–1910) Axel Heide
- (1910–1932) Andreas du Plessis de Richelieu
- (1932–1940) Enkefru du Plessis de Richelieu
- (1940–1963) Peter Møller Christensen Daell
- (1963–1993) Hørsholm Kommune
- (1993–2003) Stig Husted-Andersen
- (2003–2005) Hørsholm Kommune
- (2005–2007) Keops Development A/S
- (2007–2013) Kjær & Lassen A/S
- (2013– present M. Goldschmidt Holding
