= Løjt Kirkeby =

- Town
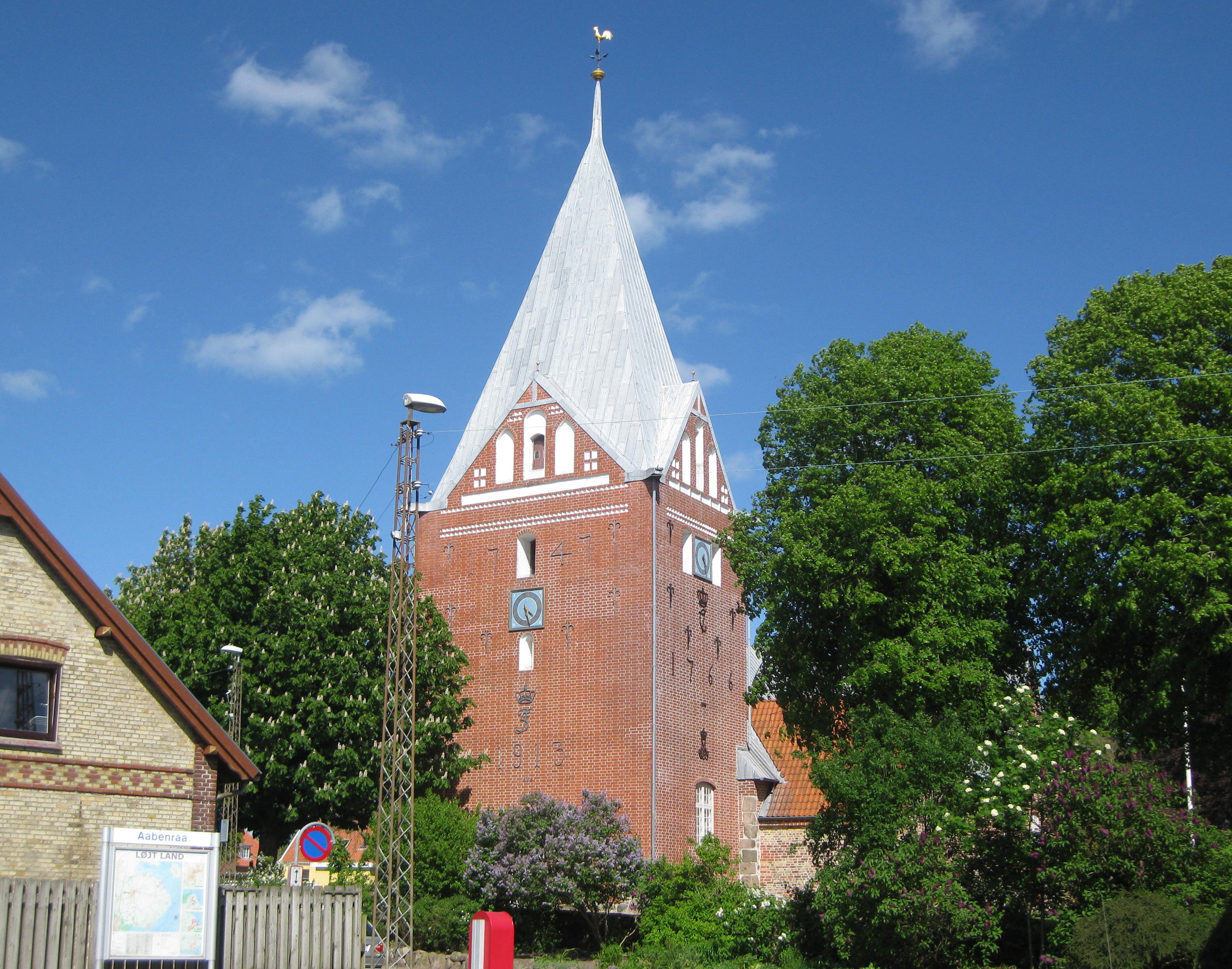
- Løjt Church

- Location in Denmark Løjt Kirkeby (Region of Southern Denmark)
- Coordinates: 55°5′23″N 9°27′40″E
- Country: Denmark
- Region: Southern Denmark
- Municipality: Aabenraa Municipality
- Parish: Løjt Parish

Area
  - Urban: 1.5 km^{2} (0.58 sq mi)

Population (2026)
  - Urban: 2,374
  - Urban density: 1,600/km^{2} (4,100/sq mi)
- Time zone: UTC+1 (CET)
  - Summer (DST): UTC+2 (CEST)
- Postal code: DK-6200 Aabenraa

Løjt Kirkeby is a town, with a population of 2,374 (1 January 2026), in Aabenraa Municipality, Region of Southern Denmark in Denmark.

The town is situated on a small peninsula named Løjt Land, 20 km (12 mi) south of Haderslev and 7 km (4.3 mi) north of Aabenraa.

== Løjt Church ==
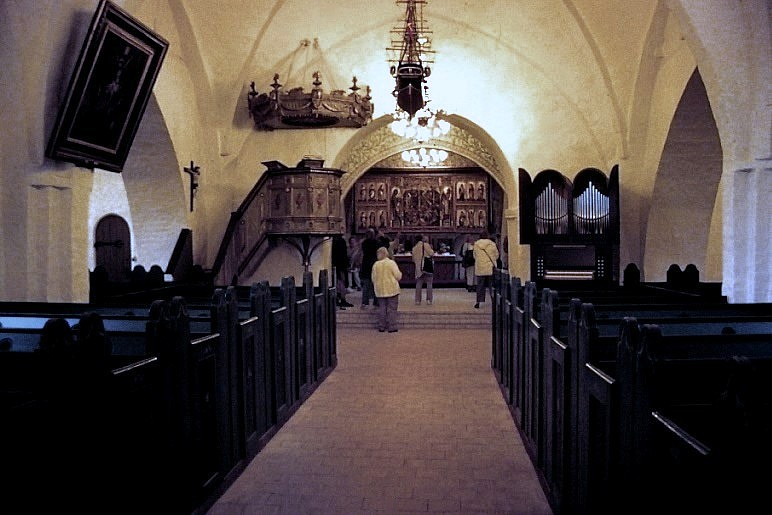
inside the nave

Løjt Church, located in the southern part of the town, was likely consecrated to Saint George.

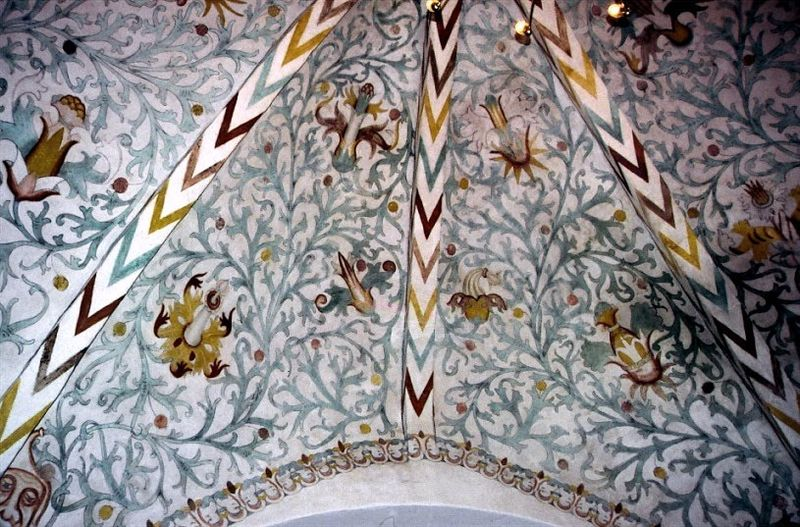
Late Gothic frescoes

The two chancel vaults are decorated with Late Gothic frescoes.

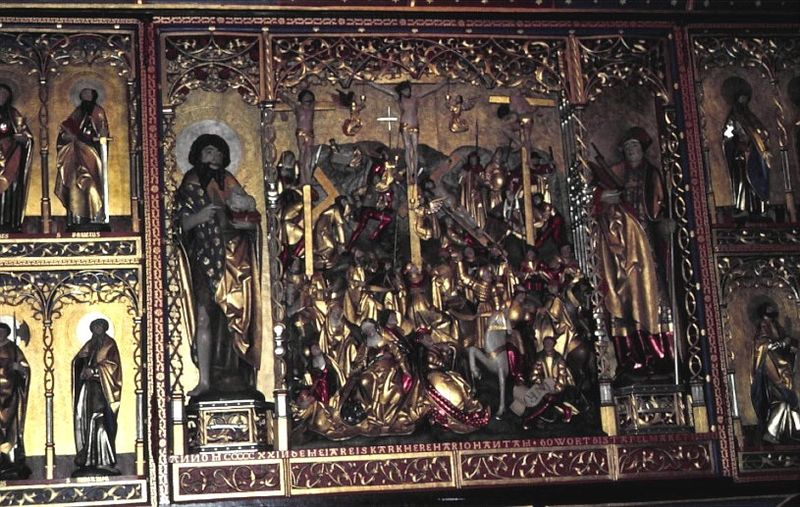
the middle panel of the altarpiece

The Late Gothic altarpiece is Southern Jutlands largest and comprises a middle panel plus two stationary and two moveable panels resting on a predella with sculptures and paintings.

== Notable people ==
- Andreas du Plessis de Richelieu (1852-1932) Danish naval officer and Siamese Minister of the Navy.
- Danish-American bandleader and music producer Ed Kirkeby (1891-1978) traced his ancestry to Løjt Kirkeby and sometimes used the name "Ed Loyd" on record labels.
- The Danish author Marcus Lauesen (1907-1975) was born in Løjt Kirkeby.
