= Hans Nicolai Arctander =

Danish government official (1757–1837)

Hans Nikolaj Arctandcr
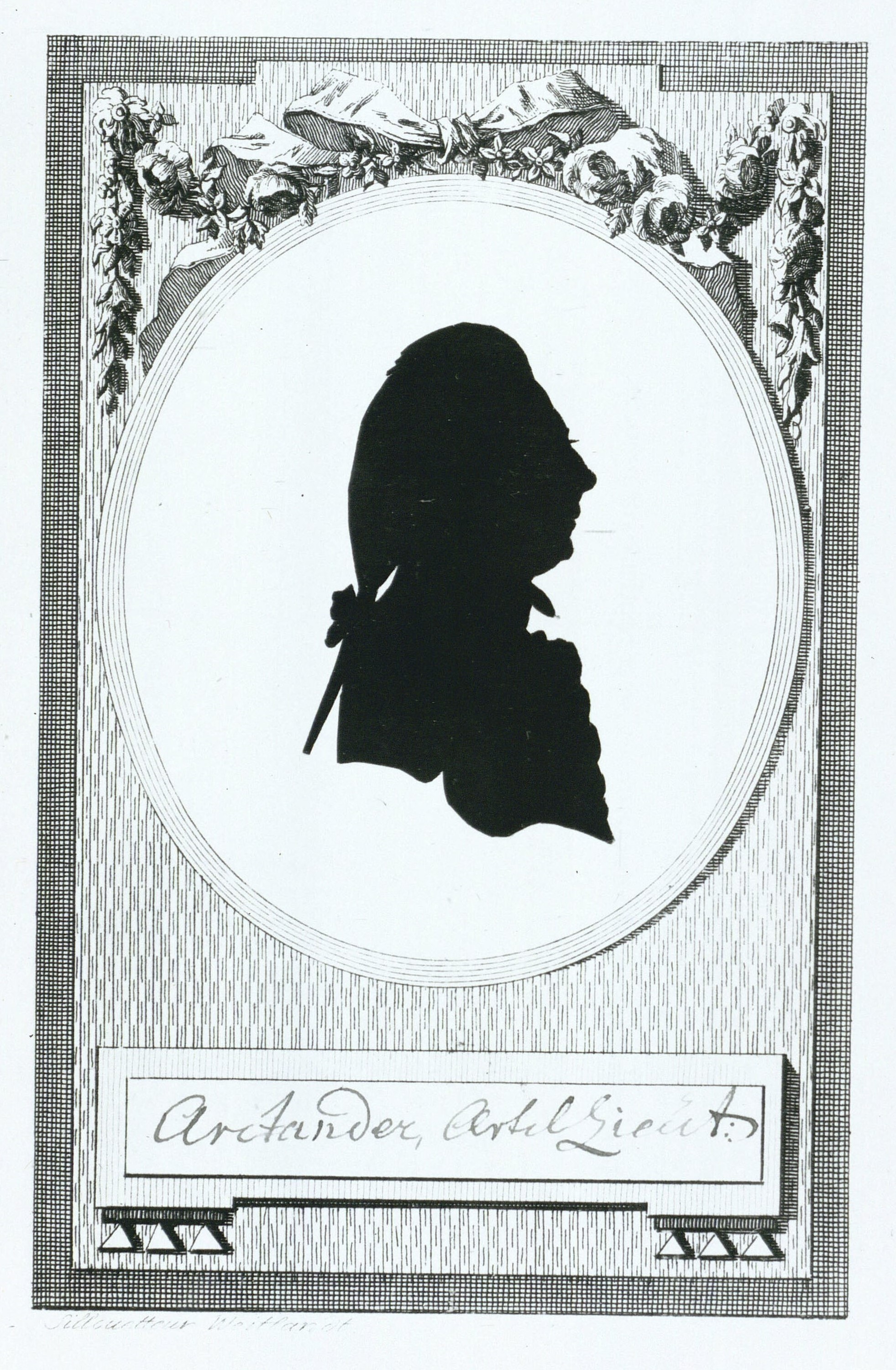
- Hans Nicholai Arctander by , Joachim Gottfried Wilhelm Weitlandt
- Born: 1757; Borge Præstegjæld
- Died: October 21, 1837 (aged 79–80)
- Occupations: Norwegian-Danish government official, county governor

Hans Nikolaj Arctander (1757 – 21 October 1837) was a Norwegian-Danish government official. He served as county governor (Danish: Amtmand) of Frederiksborg County from 1805 to 1826.

== Early life and education ==
Arctander was born in Borge Præstegjæld to army captain Poul Arctander and Alette Kirstine Thaulow. His sister Anna Elisabeth Arctander (1757-1837) was married to the clergy and humn writer Jacob Abrahamsen Preüs (1733-1805). Arctander became a corporal in the 2nd Småland Infantry Regiment. On 1 October 1774, he enrolled at the military Free Mathematical School in Christiania. Due to his outstanding gift for mathematics, he was deemed particularly well suited for a career in the engineering troops.

== Career ==
In 1775, he was appointed srtykjunker in the Artillery Corps. In 1776, he was made a second lieutenant.

In 1784, he was appointed junior surveyor (landmåler). In the following year, he was promoted to senior surveyor (landinspektør) with rank of first lieutenant. At his own initiative, he created a proposal for excavation of Søborg Lake in Kronborg County. The plan was realized as proposed by Arctander in 1794-99, resulting in a greatly improved economic returns from the leasing of the fishery in the lake. In 1792, Arctander was appointed Regimentskriver at Frederiksborg District. In 1793, he left the army with the rank of captain.

On 1 July 1796, he became a councillor (kommiteret) in Rentekammeret. On 24 February 1797, he became a member of Landkommissionen. In 1800, he was awarded the title of justitsråd.

On 20 March 1805, he was appointed county governor of Frederiksborg County (with effect from 1 May). One of his most important initiatives was the improvement of the local road system. He remained on the post until 1826. He was succeeded by Herman Gerhard Treschow. In conjunction with his retirement, he was awarded the title of Konferentsraad.

== Personal life ==
Arctander was married to Agnete Birgitte Brammer on 13 June 1789. She was a daughter of county manager Frederik Christian Brammer. He owned the property Bredgade 38 (then No. 175, St. Ann's East Quarter) in the c. 1806. Arctander died on 21 October 1837 and us buried at Asmindegrød graveyard.

His eldest daughter Anna Alette Christine Arctander (1792-1825) was married to count Andreas Erich Heinrich Ernst von Bernstorff (1791-1837) who succeeded his mother to Gyldensteen as Vount Bernstorff-Gyldensteen. The younger daughter Frederikke Louise Elisabeth Arctander (1798–1886) was married to Georg Flemming Henrik Lerche til Lerchenborg (1799–1871)

Civic offices
Preceded by Heinrich Levetzau	County Governor of Frederiksborg County; 1805–1826	Succeeded by Herman Gerhard Treschow
