= Kerwin Peixoto =

Peruvian footballer (born 1988)

Personal information
- Full name: Kerwin Peixoto Chiclayo
- Date of birth: 21 February 1988 (age 38)
- Place of birth: Lima, Peru
- Height: 1.80 m (5 ft 11 in)
- Positions: Center back; full back

Team information
- Current team: San Cristóbal
- Number: 18

Youth career
- 2004-2006: Alianza Lima

Senior career*
Years	Team	Apps	(Gls)
2007–2008	Alianza Lima	10	(0)
2009	→ Alianza Atlético (loan)	29	(1)
2010	Alianza Lima	3	(0)
2011	Cobresol FBC	9	(0)
2012	Atlético Grau		
2013	Sport Boys		
2014	San Simón	38	(0)
2015	Cienciano	14	(0)
2016	Imerco		
2018	Santa Rosa	11	(0)
2019	San Cristóbal		
2020–2022	Chavelines Juniors		

International career
	Peru U20	3	(0)
2009	Peru	1	(0)
- * Club domestic league appearances and goals as of 20:35, 29 March 2020 (UTC)

Kerwin Peixoto Chiclayo (born 21 February 1988 in Lima) is a Peruvian footballer who plays as a defender for San Cristóbal.

== International career ==
He has represented Peru at the U-17 and U-20 levels. Peixoto made his full international debut on November 19, 2009 in a friendly match against Honduras, which ended in a 2-1 win in favor of Peru.
