= Friedrich von Gram =

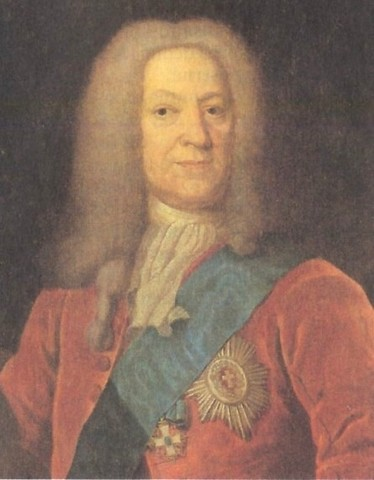
Friedrich von Gram

Friedrich von Gram (6 April 1664 – 25 March 1741) was a Danish government official who served as Royal Chief Forester (Danish: Overjagtmester)) and county governor (Danish: Amtmand) of Frederiksborg and Kronborg counties in North Zealand. He is remembered for playing a key role in the efforts to combat the problems with sand drift at Tisbilde and Tibirke along Zealand's northern shoreline. His work was later continued by his two sons, Friederich Carl von Gram, as county governor, and Carl Christian Gram, as Royal Chief Forester.

== Early life and background ==
Gram was born on 6 April 1664 at Neumark to dragoon captain Eckard von Gram zu Grahlow und Neumart and N. N. von Wreech (died 1664). He came into Danish service via his uncle, Friedrich von Brandt, who was Brandenburg's envoy to Copenhagen.

== Career ==
Gram's first employment in Denmark was as a junior forester (Danish: Jagtpage, lit. "Hunt page"). He was part of a group of foresters which was sent to Jutland to regulate growing wolf packs. In 1702, he was appointed as district forester of Zealand. At the same event, he was awarded the title of Master of the Royal Hunt (Danish: Hofjægermester).

In 1718, he was appointed as county governor of Frederiksborg and Kronborg counties. He played a central role in the work with controlling drifting sand at Tisvilde and Tibirke. In this work, he was assisted by Johann Ulrich Röh, who focussed on planting lyme grass, rather than building fences as his predecessor had experimented with. Other important initiatives included the construction of a new poorhouse (together with Peder Hersleb) and a new hospital in Hillerød. He was also committed to improving the management of Frederiksborg Latin School.

In 1730, Gram was also appointed as Royal Chief Forester (Overjagtmester). He was a driving force behind two royal decrees aimed at regulating hunting (8 April 1732) and forest management (27 January 1733).

Gram was awarded the title of Etatsråd in 1708 and Gehejmeråd in 1729. Overjægermester 1730. He became a White Knight in 1714, a Blue Knight in 1730, and was awarded the Ordre de l'Union Parfaite in 1732.

== Personal life and legacy ==
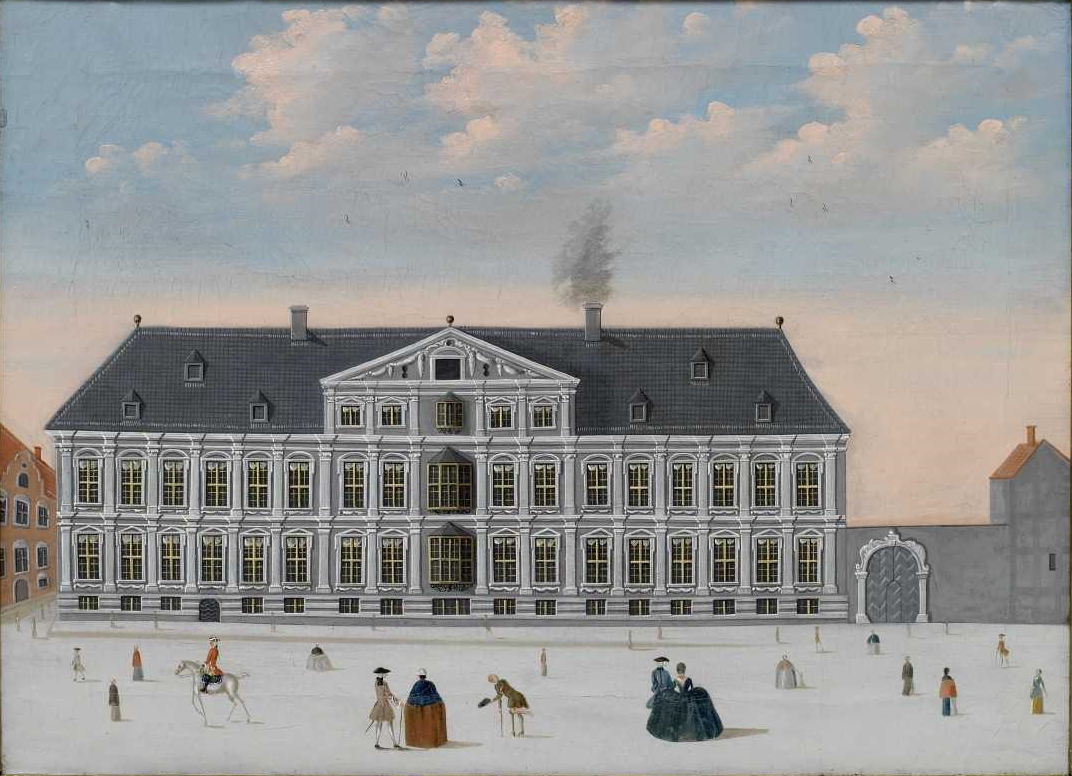
The Gram Mansion on Kongens Nytorv in 1749. It was then owned by his son Carl Christian von Gram.

Gram was married to Henriette Henry de Cheusses (died 1704) on 9 November 1700. She was the daughter of marquis Jacques Henry de la Jarrie de Cheusses (died c. 1675) and Renée de Lauzeré (died 1688). They had two sons prior to her early death in 1706. Gram was then married, secondly, in 1708, to Charlotte Sophie von Hattenbach (26 June 1670). She was a daughter of drost in Rodenberg Ernst von Hattenbach (1617-94) and Anna Katharina v. Haken.

Gram owned the large Baroque style Gram Mansion on Kongens Nytorv. His work in Northern Zealand was continued by his two sons, Friederich Carl von Gram, who succeeded him as county governor of Frederiksborg and Kronborg counties, and Carl Christian von Gram, who succeeded him as Chief Forester.

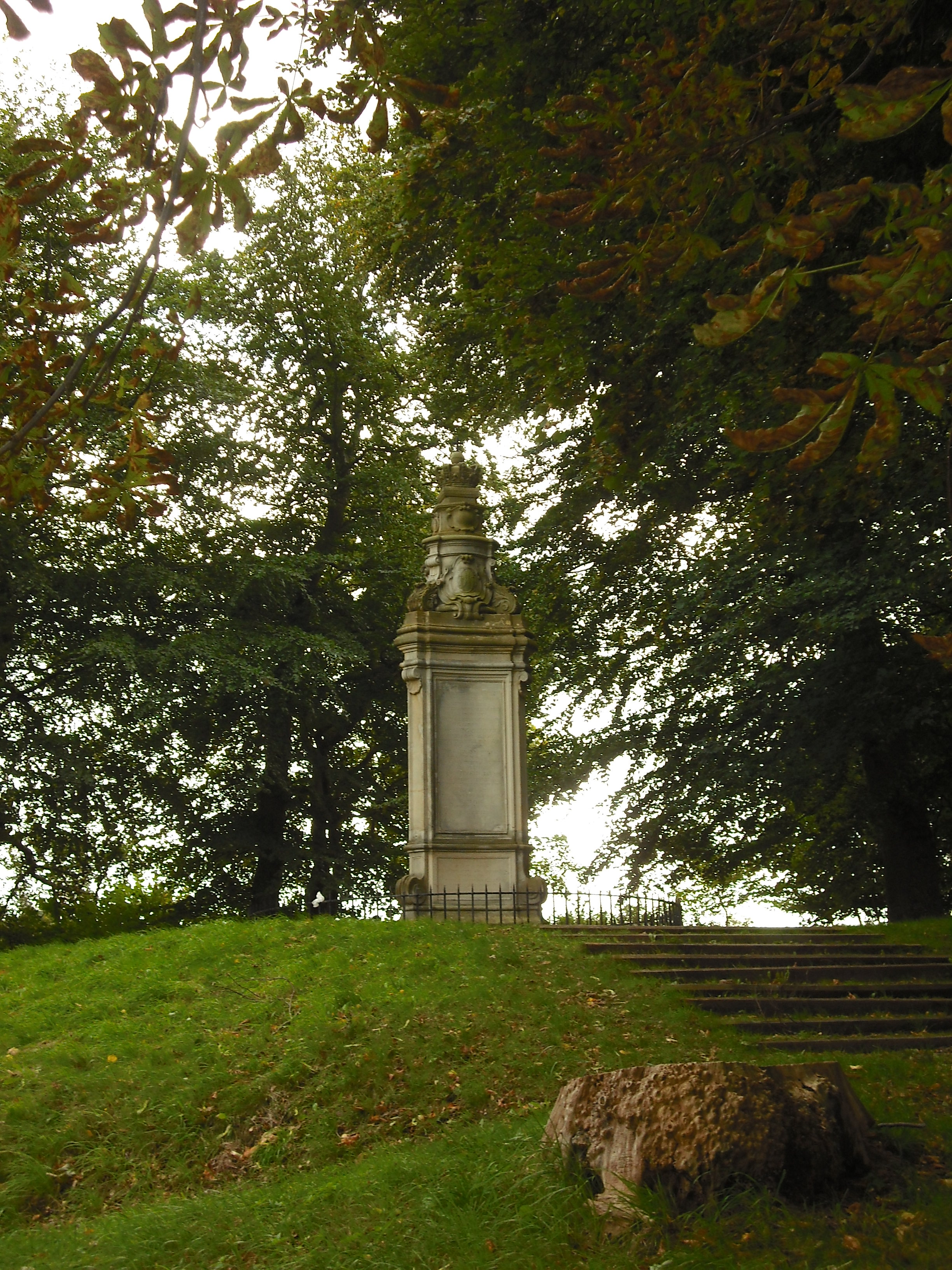
The Sand Drift Monument at Tisvilde.

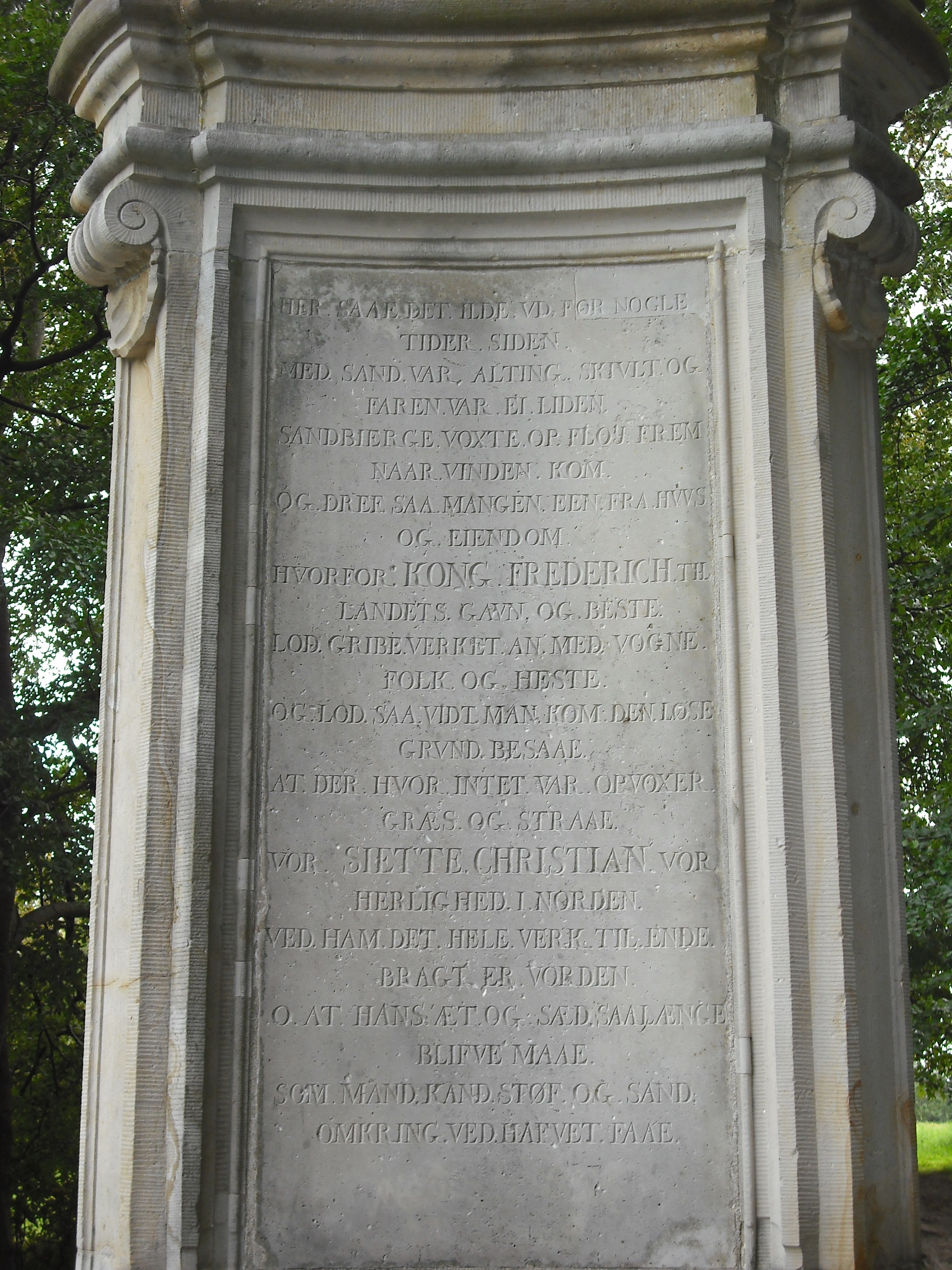
One of the inscriptions.

A monument commemorating the work with controlling the sand along Zealand's north coast was installed on a hilltop south of Tisvilde. The six-metre-tall monument was created by Elias David Häusser. The inscriptions—in Danish, German and Latin—mentions Gram and the other involved government officials, alongside the two kings, Frederick IV and Christian VI, during whose reigns the work took place.

The Gram Mansion was demolished when Hotel d-Angleterre's new building was constructed in the 1870s. Gram's coat of arms was reinstalled on the new building.

Civic offices
Preceded by Valentin von Eickstedt	County Governor of Frederiksborg County; 1718–1741	Succeeded by Friedrich Carl von Gram
Preceded by Valentin von Eickstedt	County Governor of Kronborg County; 1718–1741	Succeeded by Friedrich Carl von Gram
