= Johan Otto Raben =

Johan Otto Raben (22 February 1646 – 11 November 1719) was a Danish military officer and court official who served as lord chamberlain for Christian V and as county governor of Frederiksborg and Kronborg counties in North Zealand. He was the progenitor of the Danish Raben family.

== Early life and education ==
Raben was born on 22 February 1646 in Mecklenburg to colonel Victor Raben and Sophie Hedevig von Walschleben.

== Career ==
Raben was appointed court page (hofjunker) at the Danish court in 1667. In 1671, he was promoted to kammerjunker.

He later joined the army. In 1676, he was appointed ritmester at the 2nd Jutland Cavalry Regiment. 1677 saw him promoted to major and colonel-lieutenant. In the summer of 1678, under Ulrik Frederik Gyldenløve, he took part in the Siege of Bohus fortress and the Battle of Hisingen.

Raben returned to court service after leaving the army in 1680. On 1 October 1683, he was appointed lord chamberlain (Hofmarskal).

On 1 May 1697, he was appointed county governor of Frederiksborg and Kronborg counties. He concurrently served as inspector of the royal stables and stud farms in North Zealand. When Charles XII landed on Zealand in 1700, Raben played a key role in the defence of North Zealand and Federiksborg. He retired from the posts on 30 April 1711 due to poor health. At his father's death in 1657, he became the owner of Stuck.

In 1696, Christian V granted him Vinderslevgård. He sold it in around 1700. In 1721, he was granted the monopoly on running the Royal Pawn.

== Personal life ==
Raben was married in 1685 to Dorothea von Reiche (died 1689), daughter of Martin von Reiche. On 12 July 1692, he married secondly to Emerentia Levetzau (1669-1746). She was a daughter of Geheimeraad Hans Frederik Levetzau.

Raben died at Stuck on 11 November 1719. His widow bought the estates Aalholm (1725) and Bramslykke (1732) on Lolland. In her testament, 1734, she established the countship of Christiansholm for their grandson Christian Taben. She had also acquired the estates Bremersvold and Kjærstrup.

== Awards ==
On 25 April 1795, Raben was created a Knight of the Order of the Dannebrog. On 10 November 1699, he was awarded the title of geheimeråd.

Civic offices
Preceded by [ Eggert Christopher von Knuth	County Governor of Frederiksborg County; 1697–1741	Succeeded by Valentin von Eickstedt
Preceded by Eggert Christopher von Knuth	County Governor of Kronborg County; 1697—1717	Succeeded by Valentin von Eickstedt
