= Heinrich Levetzau =

Danish court official

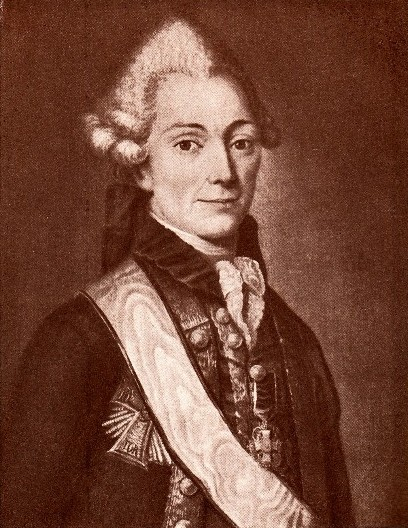
Heinirch von Levetzau

Heinrich Levetzow (4 October 1734 – 24 March 1820) was a Danish court official,

== Early life and education ==
Levetzeau was born on 4 October 1734, the son of Hans Heinrich von Levetzau (died 1761) and Anna Dorothea née von Plessen (died 1739). His father's holdings included Hoppenrade, Schorrentin, and Schwarzenhof.

== Career ==
Levetzau started his career as court page (kammerpage) at dowager queen Sophie Magdalene's court.He was later promoted to hofjunker, then to kammerjunker. In 1765, he was appointed Hofjægermester) in Hørsholm. From 1768, he concurrently served as her lord chamberlain (Hofmarskal). After her death, he served as Master of the Royal Hunt in Hørsholm County from 1770–1809. During 1771–1805, he was also appointed county governor of Frederiksborg, Kronborg and Hørsholm counties. During that same time period, he also served as Chief Stud Master (Overstutmester) at Frederiksborg Stud. He was also part of the management of the Royal Veterinarian School (1777–1805) and the royal stud farms (1789–1805). In 1766, he became chamberlain (kammerherre).

== Personal life ==
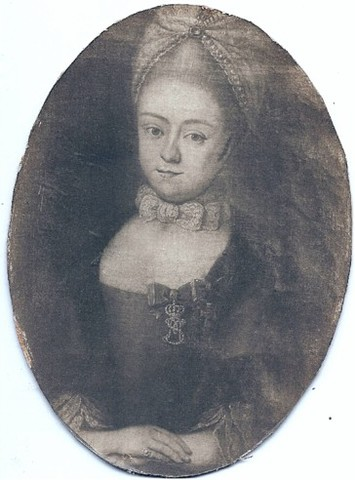
Frederikke Louise, countess of Schaffalitzky de Muckadell

Levetzau married Frederikke Louise, countess of Schaffalitzky de Muckadell (1749–1786), on 13 December 1765. She was a daughter of Gehejmeraad Albrecht Christopher, Count of Schaffalitzky de Muckadell and Christiane Sophie née von der Lühe. He owned the estate Kokkedal. He died on 24 March 1920. Four of their children survived to adulthood and had descendants:

- Sophie von Levetzau (1771–1803), married to Christian Cornelius Lerche.
- Sophie Magdalena Levetzau (1782–1856), married first to the naval officer Ditlef Reusch Fries (1771–1808) and secondly to chief forester Henrik Vilhelm Tillisch (1788–1860)
- Birgitte Louise von Levetzau (1784–1860), married to chamberlain Carl Georg Frederik Lerche (1775–1858)
- Henriette Cathrine von Levetzau (1786–1851), married captain-lieutenant Georg Flemming Lerche-Lerchenborg (1774–1809)

== Awards ==
In 1768, he was awarded the Ordre de l'Union Parfaite. In 1769, he was created a White Knight. In 1776, he was awarded the title of Gehejmeraad. In the same year, he became naturalized member of the Spanish nobility. In 1790, he was awarded the title of Gehejmekonferensraad. In 1719, he was awarded the Order of the Elephant.

Civic offices
Preceded by Friedrich Carl von Gram	County Governor of Frederiksborg County; 1771—1805	Succeeded by Hans Nicolai Arctander
Preceded by Friedrich Carl von Gram	County Governor of Kronborg County; 1771—1805	Succeeded by Hans Nicolai Arctander
Preceded by C. Chr. Dauw	County Governor of Hørsholm County; 1771—1805	Succeeded by H. N. Arctander
