= Karen Huitfeldt =

Danish courtier (1700–1778)

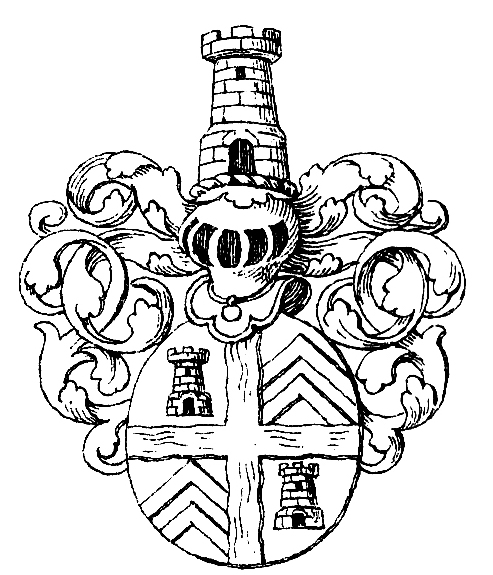
Werentskiold or Werenschiold coat of arms by H. B. Storck

Karen Huitfeldt, née Werenskiold (3 June 1700 – 1778) was a Norwegian courtier.

She was born at Sarpsborg in Østfold as the daughter of the nobleman Niels Werenschiold til Hafslund (1669–1741) and Elisabeth de Tønsberg (1673–1742). On 15 September 1719, she married nobleman Hartvig Huitfeldt (1677–1748) who was Lieutenant General and commander at Fredrikstad Fortress in Østfold from 1740.

Karen Huitfeldt was given the Ordre de l'Union Parfaite in 1755 and served as Chief Court Mistress (overhoffmesterinne) to Queen Juliana Maria from 1757-1767.
