= Bornholm County =

Bornholm County Bornholms Amt (Danish)
- Former county
- Coat of arms

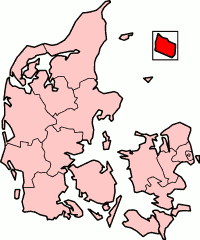
- Bornholm County in Denmark
- Coordinates: 55.12°N 14.90°E
- Country: Denmark
- Island: Bornholm
- Seat: Rønne

Area
  - Total: 588 km^{2} (227 sq mi)

Population (2003)
  - Total: 44,100

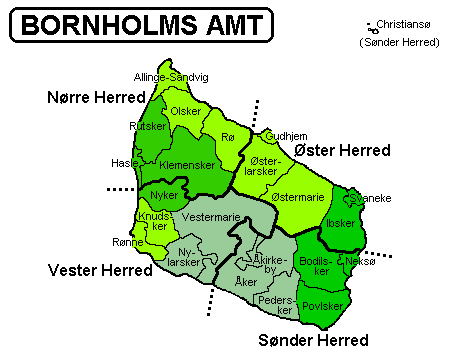
Bornholm and Christiansø hundreds and 5 municipalities (1970-2002) in green colour and municipalities before April 1, 1970

Bornholm County (Danish: Bornholms Amt) is a former county (Danish: amt) on the island of Bornholm in easternmost Denmark.

== Short history ==
The county was established in 1662, replacing the former Hammershus Len. It was the only county unchanged by the administrative reforms of 1793 and 1970 consequently occupying the same territory from 1662 until 2002. Before the reform in 1970 there were 21 municipalities on the island, of which 6 market city municipalities (Danish: købstadskommuner) and 15 parish municipalities (sognekommuner).

The 6 market city municipalities were supervised by the county, differing from the situation in the rest of Denmark where the market city municipalities were supervised by the Interior ministry. This distinction ended in 1970, and since then only the term kommune (municipality) is used.

Following a local referendum in 2001, as of January 1, 2003, the county and the island's five municipalities merged forming the new Bornholm Regional Municipality (Bornholms Regionskommune). It is supervised by the State Administration of Greater Copenhagen (Statsforvaltningen Hovedstaden).

== List and map of former hundreds (herreder) and municipalities ==
- Nørre
- Sønder
- Vester
- Øster

== List of municipalities (1970-2002) ==
- Aakirkeby municipality
- Allinge-Gudhjem municipality
- Hasle municipality
- Nexø municipality
- Rønne municipality

== County governors ==
- List of county governors of Bornholm
