= Andreas du Plessis de Richelieu =

Danish naval officer and businessman

Vice Admiral Andreas du Plessis de Richelieu
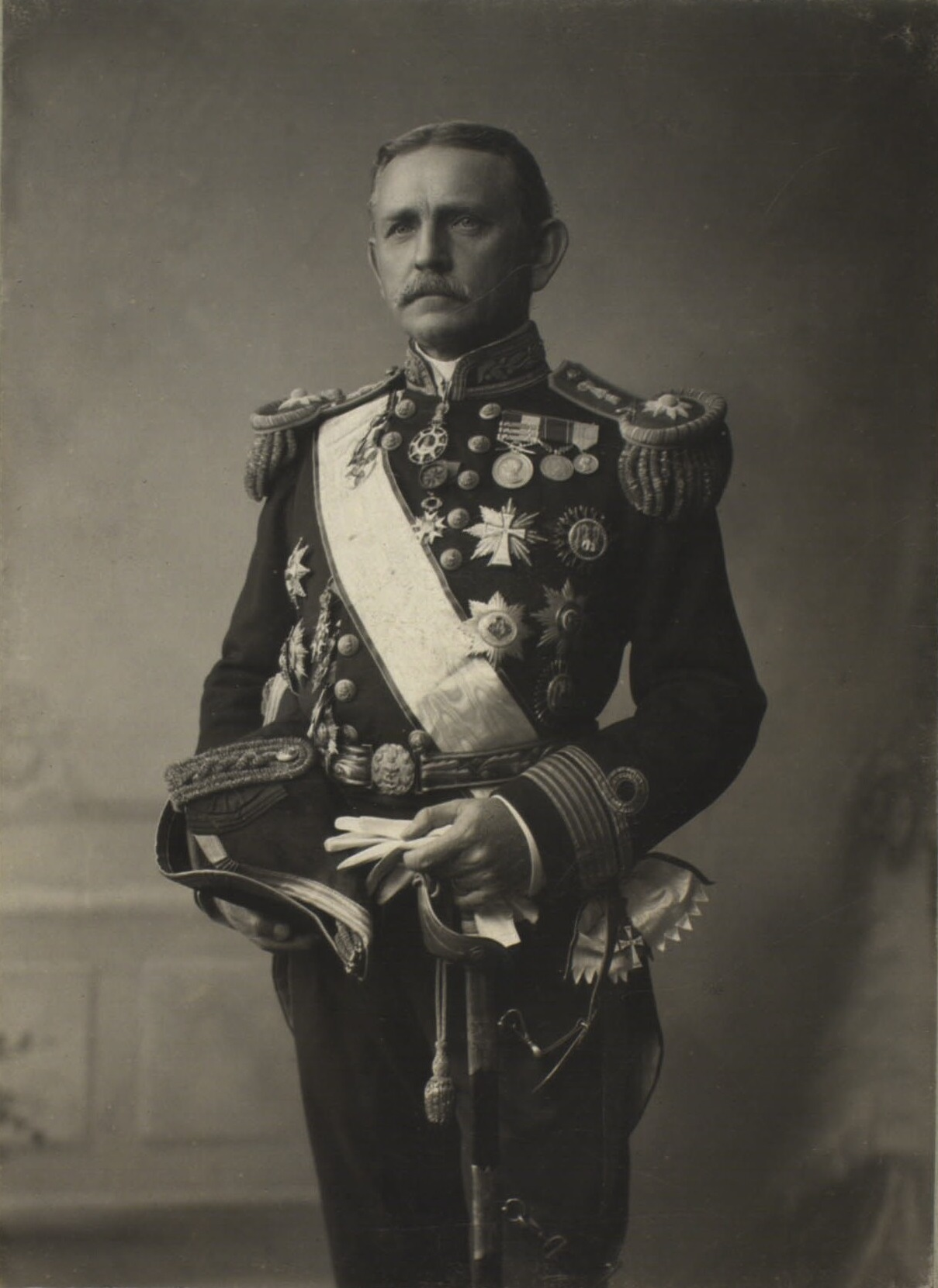
- Andreas du Plessis de Richelieu in 1903

Commander of the Navy Department
- In office 16 January 1900 – 29 January 1901
- Monarch: Chulalongkorn
- Preceded by: Prachak Silapakhom
- Succeeded by: Bhanurangsi Savangwongse

Personal details
- Born: 24 February 1852 Løjt Kirkeby, Denmark
- Died: 25 March 1932 (aged 80) Hørsholm, Denmark
- Resting place: Church of Holmen
- Spouse: Dagmar Therese Louise Lerche
- Children: Louis Armand • Helge • Dagmar • Agnes Ingeborg • Lilian Agenete • Louis
- Profession: Navy officer Businessman

Military service
- Allegiance: Denmark (Thailand) Siam
- Branch/service: Royal Danish Navy; Royal Siamese Navy
- Rank: Vice Admiral

Andreas du Plessis de Richelieu (24 February 1852 – 25 March 1932) was a Danish naval officer and businessman who became a Siamese admiral and minister of the navy. He was granted the Thai noble title Phraya Chonlayutthayothin (Thai: พระยาชลยุทธโยธินทร์).

He commanded forces at the Phra Chulachomklao Fortress in the Paknam Incident of 13 July 1893, that ended the Franco-Siamese crisis, and went on to become the first and only foreign-born commander-in-chief of the Royal Thai Navy, from 16 January 1900 to 29 January 1901.

In 1884, he co-established the East Asiatic Company with fellow Danish Hans Niels Andersen and would go on to operate Siam Electricity and several railway lines in both Siam and Denmark. During his time in Siam, he formed closed relationships with King Chulalongkorn and Prince Damrong. He returned to Denmark in 1902, suffering from malaria. He died at Kokkedal House in Hørsholm and is buried at Holmens Cemetery in Copenhagen.

Botanist Ernst Johannes Schmidt in 1901, circumscribed Richelia, which is a genus of nitrogen-fixing, filamentous, heterocystous and cyanobacteria and named in Richelieu's honour.

== Biography ==
Andreas du Plessis de Richelieu was born on 24 February 1852 in Løjt Kirkeby, Denmark where his father, Louis du Plessis de Richelieu, was currently the vicar. Andreas' family originated from France and migrated to Norway around 1670 before settling in Denmark. He had a younger brother named Louis August du Plessis de Richelieu who was born on 8 January 1856. Louis would die before his brother on 30 May 1910 at 54. His father would later die in Saint Thomas, Danish West Indies in 1859 at age 38. Andreas was 6–7 years old at the time of his father's death. In 1864, Andreas was student at Roskilde Cathedral School.

Andreas Richelieu would then go on to work in the Merchant Marine where he became a Lieutenant of the Reserve in the Danish marine. During his time as a merchant marine, he would visit Bangkok, Siam where he found himself attracted to Siam.

=== Time in Siam ===
At 23 years old in 1875 he was granted an audience in Copenhagen by the Danish king Christian IX where he wished for a Letter of Introduction to the King of Siam, Chulalongkorn. Andreas would then sail from Denmark to Bangkok via Singapore and with assistance from the Danish consul, he was given an audience by Chulalongkorn on 3 April 1875. The fact that Andreas was not significantly taller than the King was important in Siamese society and both Andreas and Chulalongkorn would form a friendship between the two. A couple weeks after his meeting with Chulalongkorn, he became Captain-Lieutenant and was offered the role of second-in-command of one of the navy's ships which he turned down for command of his own ship, HSMS Regent.

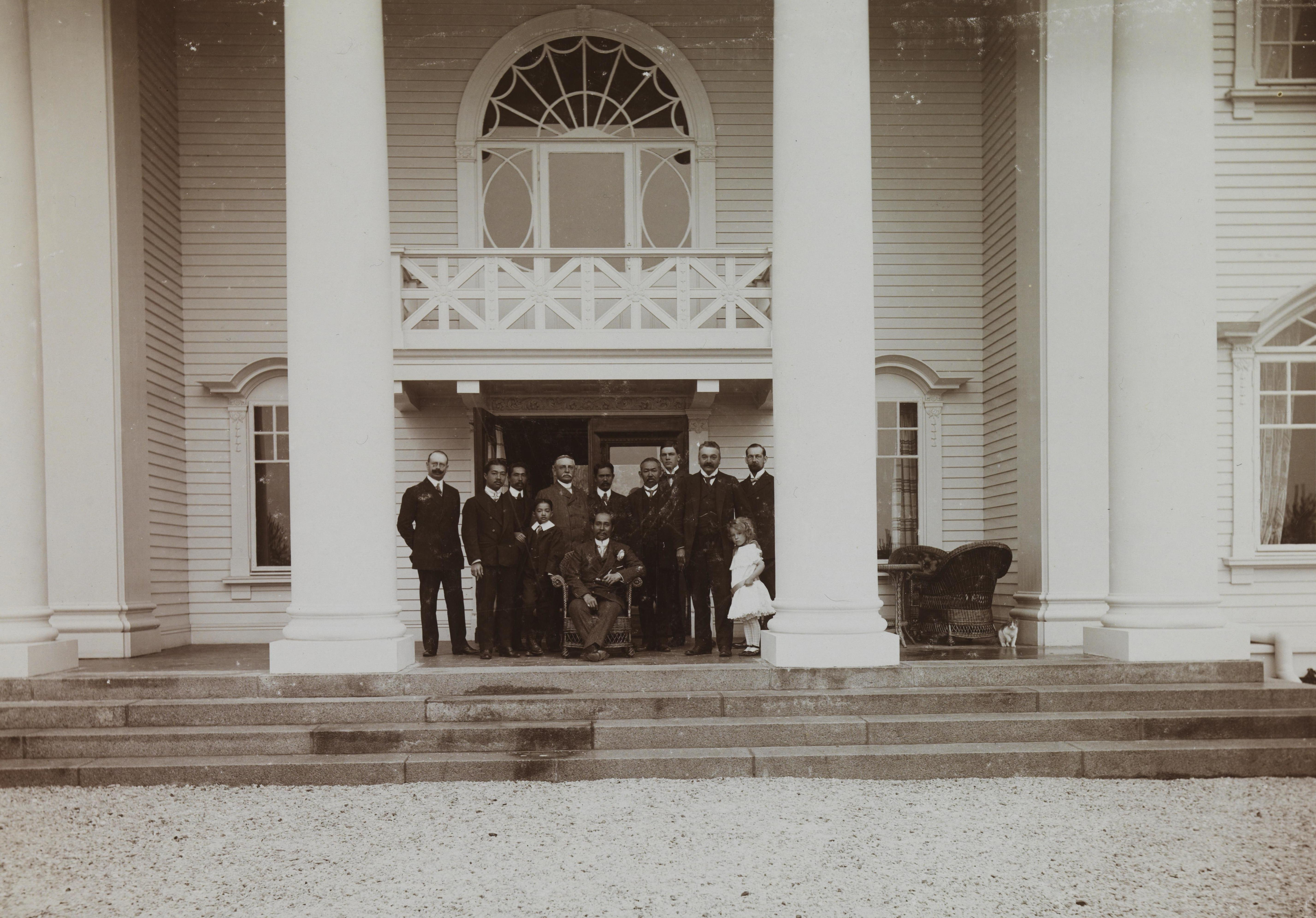
Chulalongkorn in Norway. Chulalongkorn is in the center sitting with Andreas behind him

In 1878, he was appointed Captain of the Royal Yacht Vesatri. In 1878 he became superintendent of the Marine Forces. However to Siam's navy being small, Andreas occupied himself with other projects such as establishing railways and tramlines in Bangkok. He also learnt Thai. In 1884 he established Andersen & Co. (later the EAC) with Danish business partner Hans Niels Anderson and their company owned the Oriental Hotel in Bangkok, which became the first Western hotel in Thailand. They also established the Oriental Provision Store which became the main supplier of goods to the Marine forces and the Vesatri due to Andreas' role as superintendent. In 1892, they would delivered a new royal yacht called the Maha Chakri which Hans Anderson sailed from Scotland to Siam.

In 1891, he was chosen by Chulalongkorn as an envoy on a private diplomatic mission to France, Denmark and the Russian Empire along with the king's brother Prince Damrong Rajanubhab. As Chulalongkorn continued to modernize his country, the EAC paid for concessions in industries such as teak tree logging. Andreas also acquired concessions such as building and operating a 21-kilometer railway from Samut Prakan to Bangkok.

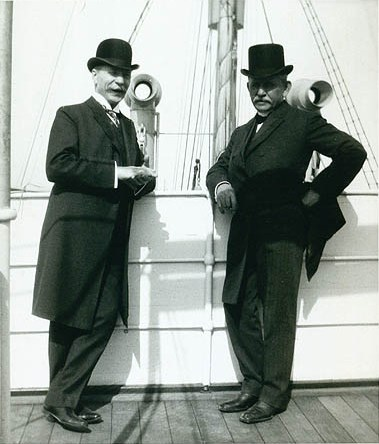
Hans Niels Andersen and Andreas du Plessis du Richelieu in 1932

Though the project would run out of funds, Chulalongkorn would become a shareholder and invest ฿170,000 (85 million baht adjusted for inflation). The railway was inaugurated in July 1891 and would operate until 1959 where it became a tramline. He led the construction of the first electric tramline in the country which ran 18 km from the Royal Palace to Klong Toey, with Fleuron Jacobsen becoming the project's manager. It opened in 1894 under Danish ownership by Chulalongkorn.

The most important concession given to Andreas was the Siam Electric Company Ltd. which he obtained in 1898. Siam Electric had the sole responsibility of delivering electricity to Bangkok and its 40,000 inhabitants. The concession was originally an extendable 10-year concession granted for American L. E. Bennet but was sold to Andreas. The company would prove profitable along with the electric tramline it powered, generating 1,200,000 Danish Crowns or around 1,177,000 baht (5.89 billion baht adjusted for inflation). In 1912, the majority of stocks were sold to Belgians.

=== Return to Denmark ===
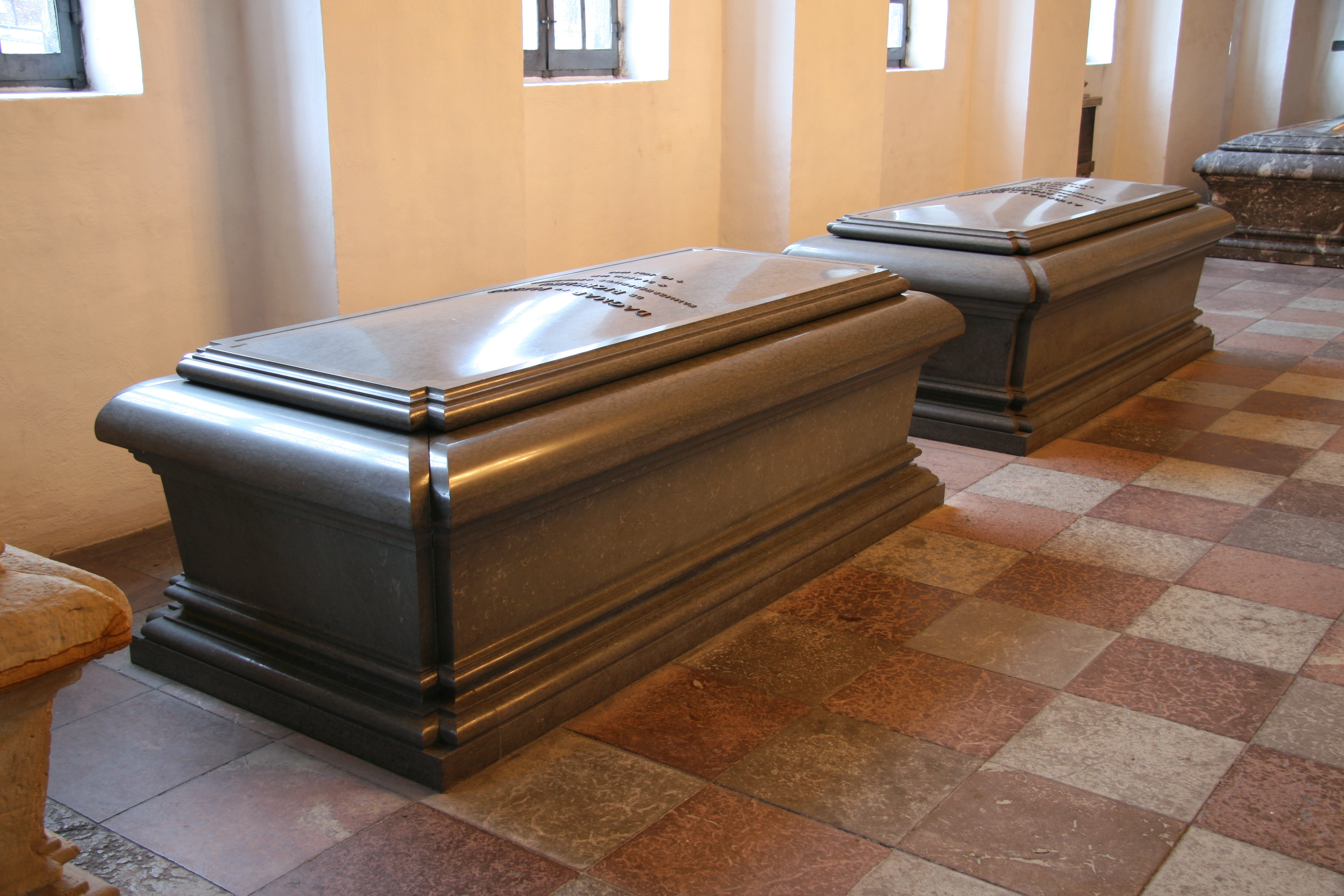
Andreas' sarcophagus at Church of Holmen, Copenhagen, Denmark

Andreas left Siam in 1902 on board the Royal yacht Maha Chakri for Singapore while accompanied by Chulalongkorn and other royal family members. Once in Denmark, be rented then purchased Kokkedal Castle in North Zealand. He also operated a private railway line from Copenhagen to Slangerup. In 1922, one of his companies - Landmandsbanken - collapsed and in 1923 he was fined 4,000 Danish Crowns after being convicted of gross negligence by the Danish Supreme Court. Despite being in Denmark, he maintained close relationships with Chulalongkorn and Prince Damrong who both visited him in Denmark, with Prince Damrong making the last visit to Andreas in 1930. He died age 80 on 25 March 1932 in Hørsholm, Denmark.

== Family ==
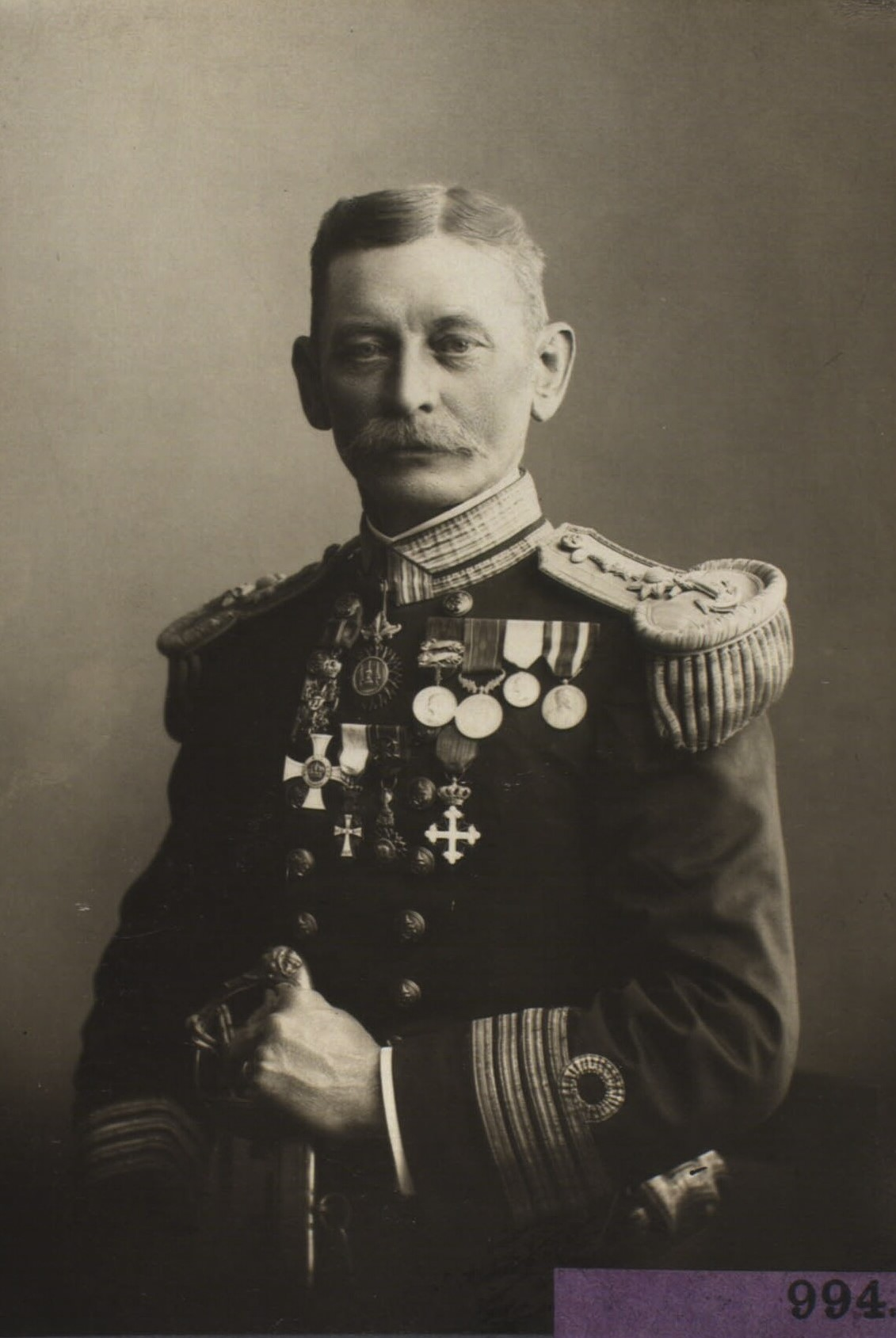
Andreas' brother Louis August du Plessis de Richelieu

Andreas was born as the oldest son and child to his father Louis du Plessis de Richelieu and mother Louise Frederikke Caroline du Plessis de Richelieu. His younger sister Louise Frederikke Caroline du Plessis de Richelieu was born on 1 June 1854 and his younger brother Louis du Plessis de Richelieu was born on 7 January 1856. Andreas would marry Dagmar Therese Louise Lerche. Dagmar was born on 21 April 1871 and lived to age 71 and died on 10 July 1942.

=== Descendants ===
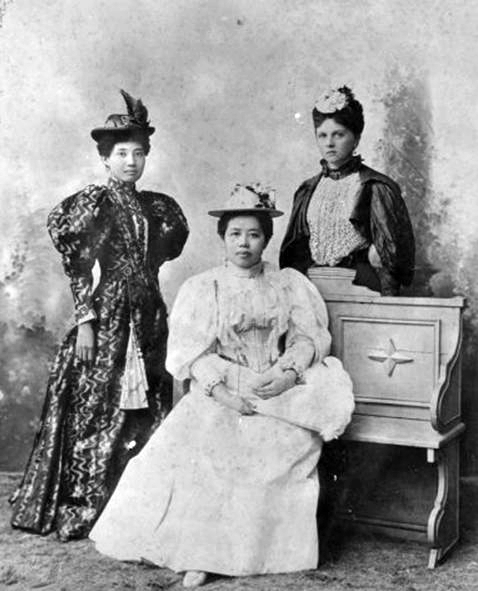
Andrea's wife Dagmar on the right in Thailand besides Chum Krairiksh and Saovabha Phongsri

Together with Dagmar, he had three sons and three daughters. Their first child and son Louis Armand was born in Bangkok on 16 November 1892. Helge was born as their second son on 14 February 1894. Dagmar was born in Bangkok on 8 May 1895. Agnes Ingeborg was their second daughter and was born on 25 February 1897. Lilian Agnete was their first child born in Denmark on 2 February 1903. Their final child was Louis.

== Honours and awards ==
from Denmark

- Chamberlain and Knight Grand Cross of the Danish Order of the Dannebrog

from Siam

- Knight Grand Cross of the Order of the White Elephant
- Knight Commander of the Order of the Crown of Siam
- Knight Grand Commander of the Order of Chula Chom Klao
- Dushdi Mala Medal Pin of Arts and Science (Military)
- Chakra Mala Medal – Medal for Long Service and Good Conduct
- King Chulalongkorn's Royal Cypher Medal, first class (1901)

from other countries

- Legion of Honour (France)
- Order of the Redeemer (Greece)
- Order of the Crown of Italy
- Order of the Crown (Prussia)
- Order of Saint Stanislaus (Russia)
- Order of the Sword (Sweden)
- Order of the Medjidieh (Ottoman Empire)
- Order of Franz Joseph (Austria-Hungary).
