= Made in Denmark (TV series) =

- Genre: Lifestyle, reality
- Created by: Danmarks Radio
- Presented by: Ane Cortzen
- Theme music composer: Audio Network; Universal Music
- Country of origin: Denmark
- Original language: Danish
- No. of seasons: 3
- No. of episodes: 19

Made in Denmark is a Danish lifestyle and reality television program, in which a number of professionals in arts and crafts display their skills in their own area, and experiment with the other participant's materials. It debuted in 2015 on Danmarks Radio. The program was hosted by Ane Cortzen.

== Series overview ==
| Season | Episodes | Year | Winner |
|---|---|---|---|
| One | 8 | 2015 | Nina (potter) |
| Christmas Special | 3 | 2015 | None |
| Two | 8 | 2016 | Anders (concrete designer) |

=== Season One (2015) ===
The first season of Made in Denmark featured 7 craftsmen, one of which would be the mentor in each episode. The mentor would teach the other 6 how to use their material, and in the end a famous personality within that field would judge the creations that the participants had made. The final episode was a finale in which all 7 craftsmen participated and a judge would declare the final winner.

==== Participants ====
| Participant | Age | Residence | Profession | Individual victories |
|---|---|---|---|---|
| Charlotte Steen | 49 | Christiania | Blacksmith | 2 |
| Kasper Boye | 29 | Copenhagen | Woodworker | 1 |
| Marika Kjellstrøm Christensen | 28 | Aarhus | Silversmith | 2 |
| Louise Helmersen | 41 | Brenderup | Paper designer | 4 |
| Claus Broe | 64 | Helsingør | Leather craftsman | 0 |
| Nina Lund | 42 | Ejstrupholm | Potter | 2 |
| Mikkel Yerst | 36 | Silkeborg | Glasssmith | 4 |

==== Episodes ====
| # | Area | Winners | | Judge |
| # | Area | Training task | Creative task | Judge |
|---|---|---|---|---|
| 1 | Blacksmithery | Marika | Louise | Jesper Nordø |
| 2 | Woodworking | Louise | Mikkel | Knud Erik Hansen |
| 3 | Silversmithery | Mikkel | Louise | Jane Kønig |
| 4 | Papercraft | Nina | Charlotte | Amanda Betts |
| 5 | Leathercraft | Mikkel | Mikkel | Ejnar Truelsen |
| 6 | Pottery | Louise | Charlotte | Niels Bastrup |
| 7 | Glassblowing | Kasper | Marika | Pernille Bülow |
| 8 | Finale | Nina; **Winner of Made in Denmark** | | Erik Bagger; Susanne Holte; Kasper Rønn |

=== Christmas special: Made in Denmark Jul ===
Made in Denmark Jul is the Christmas special for the series. It featured the 7 craftsmen from the first season, making Christmas decorations. The judge for the special was Jette Frölich. The special consisted of three episodes.

==== Episodes ====
| # | Theme | Teams Winner team in bold |
|---|---|---|
| 1 | Christmas tree | Claus, Charlotte; Leather, Metal |
| 1 | Christmas tree | **Louise, Marika, Mikkel**; Paper, Silver, Glass |
| 1 | Christmas tree | Nina, Kasper; Clay, Wood |
| 2 | Dinner table | Marika, Nina, Claus; Silver, Clay, Leather |
| 2 | Dinner table | Charlotte, Mikkel; Metal, Glass |
| 2 | Dinner table | **Kasper, Louise**; Wood, Paper |
| 3 | Christmas presents | Louise, Paper; Giving to Claus |
| 3 | Christmas presents | **Marika, Silver**; Giving to Nina |
| 3 | Christmas presents | Mikkel, Glass; Giving to Marika |
| 3 | Christmas presents | Nina, Clay; Giving to Louise |
| 3 | Christmas presents | Kasper, Wood; Giving to Mikkel |
| 3 | Christmas presents | Claus, Leather; Giving to Charlotte |
| 3 | Christmas presents | Charlotte, Metal; Giving to Kasper |

=== Season Two (2016) ===
The second season featured 7 new craftsmen, but followed the format of the first season. The final episode was a finale in which all 7 craftsmen participated and a judge would declare the final winner.

==== Participants ====
| Participant | Area | Individual victories |
|---|---|---|
| Sara Brunn Buch; 37, Bøvlingbjerg | Horn worker | 2 |
| Marco Friis; 42, Aarhus | Potter | 1 |
| Jonas Molberg Jørgensen; 28, Sorø | Woodworker | 1 |
| Anders Toft; 46, Aarhus | Concrete designer | 2 |
| Camilla Urban; 44, Helsingør | Gold- & Silversmith | 2 |
| Christian Gantzhorn Ibsen; 34, Kragelund | Brazier | 5 |
| Effi Pingel Schmidt; 40, Refshaleøen | Silk craftsman | 2 |

==== Episodes ====
| # | Area | Winners | | Judge |
| # | Area | Mentor's ranking | Creative task | Judge |
|---|---|---|---|---|
| 1 | Horn working | 1. Christian; 2. Effi; 3. Jonas; 4. Camilla; 5. Marco; 6. Anders | Effi | Agnar Andersen |
| 2 | Pottery | 1. Effi; 2. Christian; 3. Sara; 4. Anders; 5. Camilla; 6. Jonas | Jonas | Frantz Longhi |
| 3 | Woodworking | 1. Sara; 2. Christian; 3. Anders; 4. Effi; 5. Camilla; 6. Marco | Anders | Jesper Panduro |
| 4 | Concrete design | 1. Christian; 2. Sara; 3. Camilla; 4. Effi; 5. Marco; 6. Jonas | Christian | Tove Adman |
| 5 | Silversmithery | 1. Christian; 2. Sara; 3. Effi; 4. Jonas; 5. Marco; 6. Anders | Christian | Josephine Bergsøe |
| 6 | Brazing | 1. Marco; 2. Sara; 3. Anders; 4. Jonas; 5. Effi; 6. Camilla | Camilla | Louise Roe |
| 7 | Silk crafts | 1. Sara; 2. Jonas; 3. Anders; 4. Camilla; 5. Christian; 6. Marco | Camilla | Jesper Høvring |
| 8 | Finale | Anders; **Winner of Made in Denmark** | | Erik Bagger; Susanne Holte; Kasper Rønn von Lotzbeck |
