= Friedrich Carl von Gram =

Danish court official

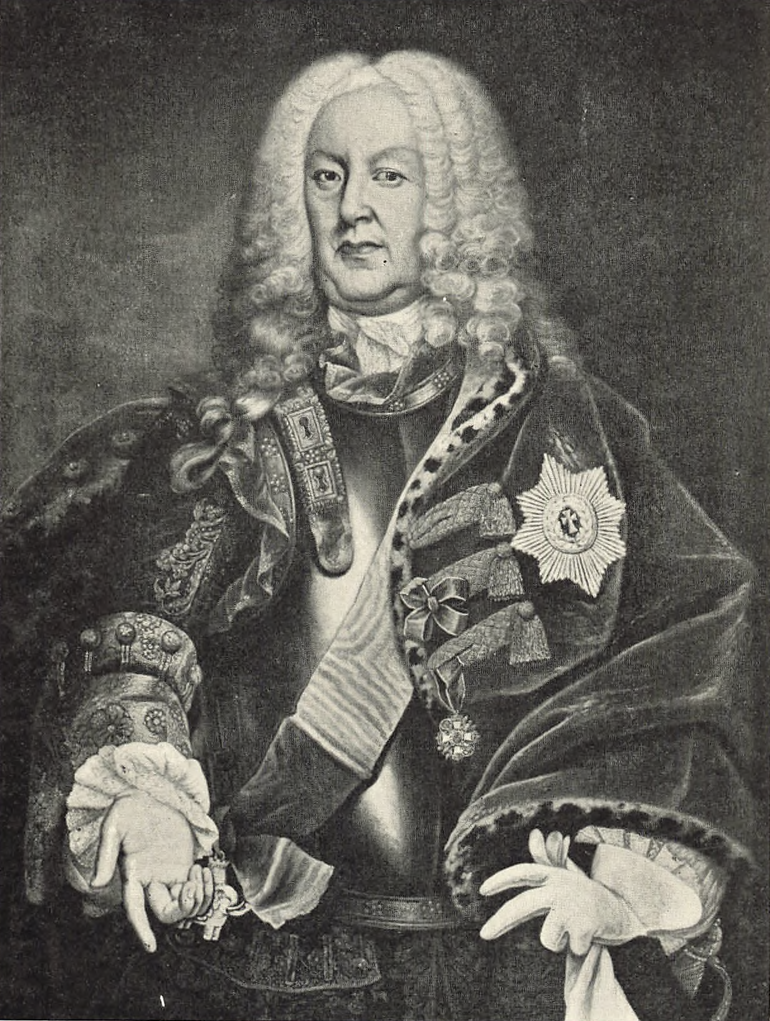
Friedrich Carl von Gram.

Friederich Carl von Gram (4 February 1702 – 9 May 1782) was a Danish court official who served as lord chamberlain (Overhofmarskal) as well as county governor (Danish: Amtmand) of Frederiksborg and Kronborg counties.

== Early life and education ==
Gram was born on 4 February 1702 to Friedrich von Gram and Henriette de Cheusses. His father had come to Denmark from Brandenburg in 1684. He was appointed to the post of county governor of Frederiksborg and Kronborg counties in 1718.

== Career ==
Gram entered court service for Frederick IV in an early age. On 1 June 1730, shortly after Christian VI's ascent to the throne, he was appointed as lord chamberlain (Overhofmarskal).

On 6 June 1731, he was created a Knight in the Order of the Dannebrog. On 15 March 1741, he succeeded his father as county governor of Frederiksborg and Kronborg counties. At the same time, he was appointed inspector of the royal stud farms. He held these posts until 10 September 1771. From 11 August 1615 to 14 November 1750, he concurrently served as diocesan governor of Zealand. On 28 November 1741, he was awarded the title of geheimeråd. On 28 October 1779, he was promoted to geheimekonferensråd. On 16 October 1769, he was created a Knight in the Order of the Elephant.

== Personal life ==
Gram was married to Hedvig von Holstein (1716–1767) on 14 September 1735. She was a daughter of Geheimeraad Hans Frederik von Holstein and Cathrine Marie von Schmitberg. Gram was an honorary member of the Royal Danish Academy of Fine Arts. He died on 9 May 1782.

Civic offices
Preceded by Friedrich von Gram	County Governor of Frederiksborg County; 1741—1771	Succeeded by Heinrich Levetzau
Preceded by Friedrich von Gram	County Governor of Kronborg County; 1741—1771	Succeeded by Heinrich Levetzau
