= Imerco =

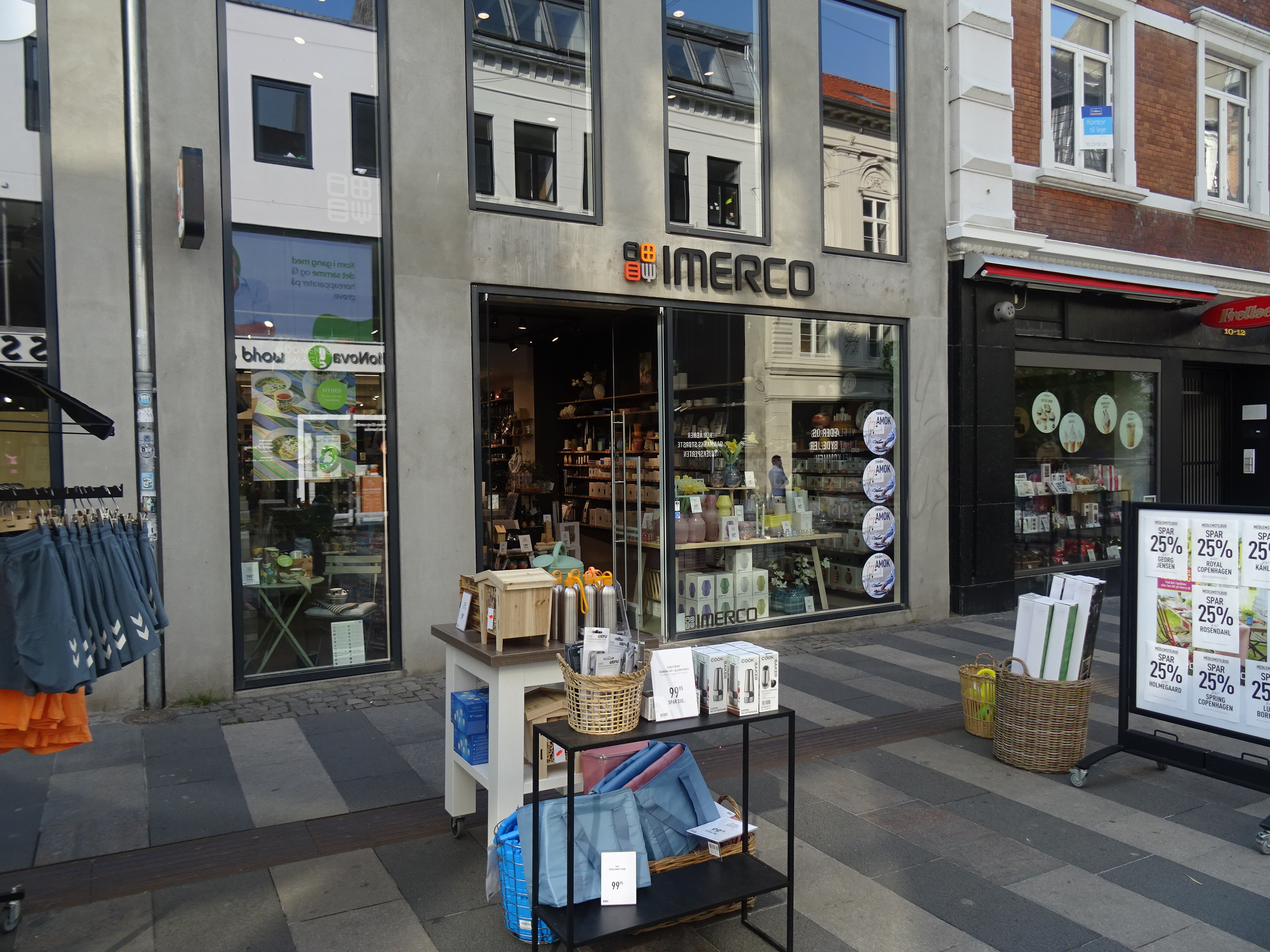
- Imerco shop in Aarhus.
- Company type: Private
- Industry: Retail
- Founded: 1928
- Headquarters: Herlev, Denmark
- Key people: Frederik Brønnum(CEO) Niels Heering(chairman)
- Revenue: DKK 1,100 million
- Number of employees: +1,100 (2014))
- Website: www.imerco.dk

Imerco is a Danish chain of 155 independent homeware shops.

== History ==
Imerco was founded in 1928. In 2007, M. Goldschmidt Capital acquired an 82 & shares of the company. In August 2016, it was announced that Imerco will merge with the competing homeware chain Inspiration.

== Organisation ==
As of 2016, Imerco consisted of 155 independent homeware shops. The company also has a web store and a customer club with more than one million members. Frederik Brønnum took over the position as CEO in 2+13.

M. Goldschmidt Capital owns 84 & of the company. On the completion of the merger with Inspiration, M. Goldschmidt Capital will own 65 % and Niels Thorborg-owned 3C Retail will own 28 %.

== Products ==
Imerco owns the brands Cook & Baker, CASA and Erik Bagger.
