= Marcus Lauesen =

Danish writer

Marcus Lauesen (born 22 November 1907 in Løjt Kirkeby, Aabenraa; died 14 October 1975 in Copenhagen) was a Danish writer from the Region of Southern Denmark town of Løjt Kirkeby, a suburb of Aabenraa. He debuted with Guds Gøglere in 1928 and had a breakthrough in 1931 with And Now We Await a Ship (Danish: Og nu venter vi paa Skib), a psychological novel about a shipbuilding family based upon the history of the author's hometown of Aabenraa. He was awarded De Gyldne Laurbær in 1961 for Mother (Danish: Mor), a novel about his childhood in Løjt Kirkeby.
