= Ordre de l'Union Parfaite =

- Badge and sash of the order.

Awarded by Sophie Magdalene of Denmark and Norway
- Type: Chivalric order in one class
- Established: 7 August 1732
- Motto: In felicissimæ Unionis Memoriam
- Status: Disestablished
- Grades: Member
- Ordre de l'Union Parfaite ribbon

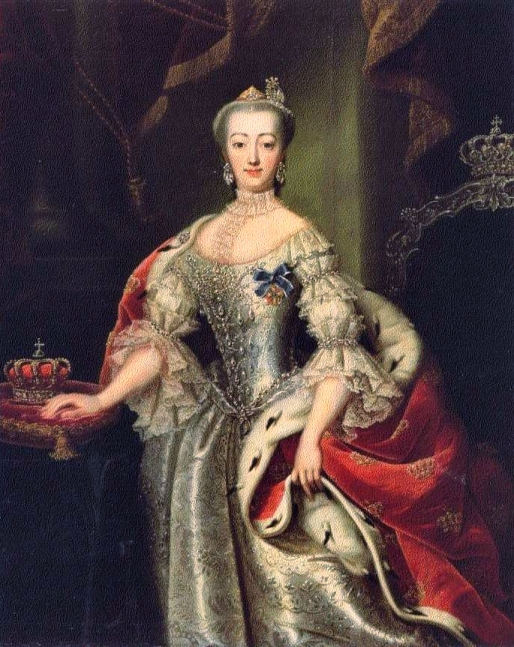
Queen consort Sophie Magdalene The medal with its dark blue ribbon can be clearly seen.

The Ordre de l'Union Parfaite was created by Queen consort Sophie Magdalene of Denmark and Norway on 7 August 1732 to celebrate the tenth anniversary of her happy marriage with King Christian VI of Denmark and Norway. It was given to both men and women. Its motto was In felicissimæ Unionis Memoriam ("In Commemoration of the Happiest [Marital] Union").

Conferral of the Order ceased after the death of the Queen on 7 May 1770.

The French name can be translated as Order of the Perfect Union or Order of Friendship. The use of French was not unusual in the eighteenth century royal Danish court or in Sophie Magdalene's German homeland, where other such examples exist, such as the Ordre pour le Mérite and the Ordre de la Sincérité.

== Insignia ==
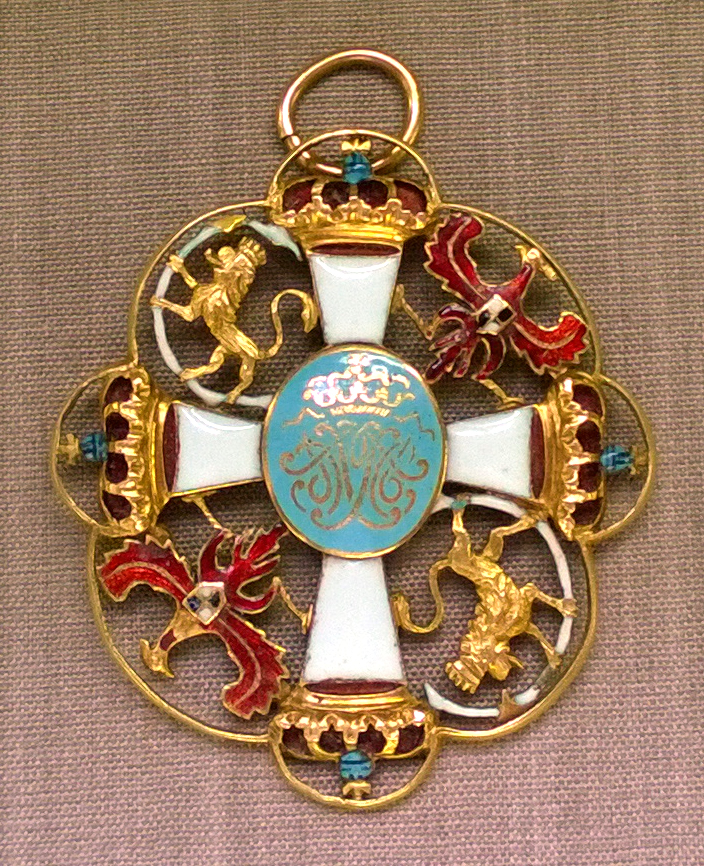
Badge, Ordre de l'Union Parfaite

The badge or "jewel" of the Order was a white enamelled cross, each arm of which was capped by a golden crown. Between the arms, a golden Norwegian lion bearing a golden, white-shafted halberd alternated with a red-enamelled, golden-headed Brandenburg eagle. A blue oval medallion, encircled by diamonds, imposed on the center of the cross displayed the crowned intertwined monograms of Sophie Magdalene and Christian VI. The silk ribbon was dark blue, edged with silver (the ribbon has become discolored over the centuries, but the original hue can still be seen in numerous painted portraits of the recipients).

Gentlemen wore the cross in a left buttonhole of their coats. Ladies bore it on their left breasts.

== Recipients ==
=== Men ===
- Count Frederik von Ahlefeldt (1770)
- Count Frederik Carl Christian Ulrik Ahlefeldt (1770)
- Count Christian Conrad Danneskiold-Laurvig (1758)
- Friedrich Carl, Duke of Holstein-Plön (by 1759)
- Gregers Christian Haxthausen (1877)
- Niels Gersdorff (1734)
- Friedrich von Gram (1732)
- Gustav Grüner (1751)
- Count Carl von Hesse-Cassel (31 March 1759)
- Count Frederick von Hesse-Cassel (31 March 1759)
- Count Christian Christoffer Holck (1764)
- Baron Adam Christopher Holsten
- Heinrich Levetzau (1763)
- Poul Vendelbo de Løvenørn (1739)
- Volrad August von der Lühe (1747)
- Count Adam Gottlob Moltke (1747)
- Frederik Christian von Møsting (1763)
- Count Frederik von Oertz (1761)
- Johann Christoph von Reitzenstein
- Claus Reventlow (1751)
- Count Ditlev Reventlow (1756)
- Count Conrad Detlev Reventlow (1750)
- Mogens Rosenkrantz (1763)
- Baron Holger Rosenkrantz (1767)
- Baron Verner Rosenkrantz (1763)
- Andreas Rosenpalm
- Count Hans Schack (1735-1796) (1763)
- Count Werner von der Schulenburg (1750)
- Baron Georg Wilhelm von Søhlenthal (1738)
- Henrik Stampe (1770)
- Christian von Støcken (1761)
- Frederik Christian von Qualen (1768)
- Baron Frederik Wilhelm Wedel-Jarlsberg (1763)
- Adam Levin von Witzleben (1732)
- Frederick Louis von Woyda (1767)

=== Women ===
- Juliana Maria of Brunswick-Wolfenbüttel
- Louise Friderica von Boyneburg of the House of Hambach
- Birgitte Sofie Gabel (1764)
- Christine Sophie von Gähler (née von Ahlefeldt) (1765)
- Amalie Juliane von Günterrode
- Christine Armgard, Duchess of Holstein-Plön (by 1759)
- Countess Anna Joachima Danneskiold-Laurvig (née von Ahlefeldt)
- Louise Charlotte of Schleswig-Holstein-Sonderburg-Glücksburg (1764)
- Dorothea Christine, Princess of Denmark (by 1759)
- Charlotte Elisabeth Henriette Holstein (1770)
- Karen Huitfeldt (1755)
- Sophia Magdalena Krag Juel Vind
- Margrethe von der Lühe (1768)
- Eleonora Marie von Lüttichau
- Margrethe Marie Thomasine Numsen
- Anna Susanna von der Osten
- Charlotte Dorothea Reventlow (née Scheel von Plessen)
- Birte Rosenkrantz
- Countess Anna Sophie Schack
- Princess Wilhelmina Augusta of Schleswig-Holstein-Nordborg-Pløens (1749)
- Charlotte Amalie Skeel (1750)
- Margarete Giedde Vind
- Frederica of Württemberg

== Sources ==
- Ackermann, Gustav Adolph (1855). Ordensbuch sämmtlicher in Europa blühender und erloschener Orden und Ehrenzeichen (in German). Annaberg: Rudolf & Dieterici. p. 221.
- Andersen, Carl (1867). Rosenborg: mindeblade fra de danske kongers kronologiske samling (in Danish). Copenhagen: Forlagsbureauet. p. 67.
