= M. Goldschmidt Holding =

M. Goldschmidt Holding A/S
- Company type: Private
- Industry: Investments
- Founded: 1979
- Headquarters: Copenhagen, Denmark
- Area served: Denmark
- Key people: Mikael Goldschmidt (CEO), Niels Heering (Chairman)
- Website: www.mgh.dk

M. Goldschmidt Holding is a holding company owned by Mikael Goldschmidt and headquartered in Copenhagen, Denmark. Established in 1979, its activities mainly consist of real estate and private equity investments. It controls companies with a total of 1,350 employees and has DKK 2.3 billion in total equity (2016).

== Headquarters ==
M Goldschmidt Holding is headquartered in an early-20th-century building occupying the gore between Grønningen (No. 21-25) and Store Kongensgade in central Copenhagen. The building is the former headquarters of Nordisk Livsforsikring Selskab (English: Nordic Life Insurance Company). It was built in 1910 by Axel Preisler and was renovated in 2006.

== Subsidiaries ==
=== M. Goldschmidt Ejendomme ===
M. Goldschmidt Ejendomme owns a portfolio of real estate mainly in the Greater Copenhagen area. The core of the portfolio is referred to as the Golden Truiangle and is surrounded by Grønningen, Store Kongensgade and Esplanaden. It comprises the properties at covering Grønningen 17-25, Poul Ankers Gade, Store Kongensgade 128-134B, Store Kongensgade 122, Jens Kofods Gade 2, Hammerensgade 1 and Store Kongensgade 118/Hammerensgade 2.

=== M. Goldschmidt Capital ===
Private equity firm M. Goldschmidt Capital, established in 2007, executes and manages the Group’s direct investments in medium-sized Danish businesses. Current investments include:

- Aquaporin A/S, a cleantech company established in 2005, is the developer and manufacturer of a patented water treatment technology. The company received a European Inventor Award from the European Patent Office in the small and medium-sized category in 2014.
- Danish Aerospace Company, a manufacturer of medical equipment for the space industry
- Imerco

=== M. Goldschmidt Aviation ===
M. Goldschmidt Aviation owns a 10-passenger Dassault Falcon 2000 LXS airplane (registration - OY-MGO), which is operated by the Danish private jet company Air Alsie in Sønderborg DK.
