= List of county governors of Bornholm =

This is a list of county governors of Bornholm County, Denmark.

== List ==
	Portrait	Incumbent	Term	Notes
1		Adolph Fuchs	1659–1662	
2		Hans Schroder (Lovenhjelm)	1662–1673	
3		Morten Berthelsen	1674–1676	
4		Thomas Fincke	1676–1677	
5		Christian Gjedde	1677–1682	
6		Bendix von Hatten	1682–1685	
7		Johan Didrik Wettberg	1685–1694	
8		Hans von Bøfke	1694–1699	
9		Valdemar Reedtz	1699–1717	
10		Johan Heinrich von Bippen	1717–1722	
11		Niels West	1722–1739	
12		Johan Christian Urne	1740–1778	
13		Torkel Jonsson Fieldsted	1778–1780	
		Administration divided	1780-1787	
14		Kristen Heiberg	1787–1801	
15		Jacob Mandix	1801–1804	
16		Fredrik Thaarup	1804–1809	
17		Christian Jespersen	1809–1836	
18		Ludvig Vilhelm Henrik Krabbe	1837–1849	
19		Julius Wegener	1849–1865	
20		Emil Vedel	1866–1871	
21		Peter Holten	1871–1894	
22		A. Groothoff	1894–1903	
23		Axel Bille-Brahe	1903–1913	
24		Knud Valloe	1913–1921	
25		O. C. H. G. Koefoed	1921–1931	
26		B. K. Øllgaard	1931–1933	
27		P. Chr. Stemann	1934–(source ends 1936)	

== See also ==
- List of county governors of Holbæk
