= Erik Bagger =

Danish designer

- Born: Erik Kristian Bagger; 21 April 1949 (age 76); Frederiksberg, Denmark
- Occupation: Designer
- Spouse(s): Birgitte Bagger (1975–2004), Caroline Bagger (2014–2020)
- Children: Frederik Bagger
- Website: erikbaggerdesign.dk

Erik Bagger (born Erik Kristian Bagger; 21 April 1949) is a Danish goldsmith, industrial designer and businessman. Bagger is best known for its glass series Grand Cru, Opera and Rosendahl.

== Life and career ==
Erik Bagger was trained as a goldsmith in 1970 and his full license was given after completing his apprenticeship working at Georg Jensen. In 1998 he became self-employed with the company Erik Bagger Design A/S and sold applied arts, which was referred to as Form Function. The same year he designs the gas lamp to Louisiana Museum of Modern Art's 40th anniversary by idea of the founder Knud W. Jensen.

Erik Bagger established the design company Erik Bagger A/S with glass stemware designed for the Copenhagen Opera and Museum of Modern Art (MoMA) in New York City. He sold majority shareholding of Erik Bagger A/S to a private equity fund.

Erik Bagger worked with his son, Frederik Bagger, in their joint private development company, as well as their studio, Erik Bagger Design A/S. Their partnership lasted until Frederik started his own design company in 2014.

== Furniture ==
Erik Bagger and his wife Caroline Bagger have begun to design a furniture collection in 2013. Erik Bagger Furniture A/S was launched by Erik Bagger with his first complete furniture collection.

In the same year, Erik and Caroline designed a stainless steel sign in honor of The Little Mermaid's 100th birthday. It tells the story of The Little Mermaid, Denmark's largest tourist attraction. The story is described in three different languages: Danish, English and Chinese.

== Media ==
Erik was invited to join the Danish TV series Made in Denmark, hosted by Ane Cortzen. He was a famous personality to judge the creations of the participants and declare the final winner. In the same year, he reached the third place in the Top trending of Danish businesses, according to Proff's latest search statistics.
