= Løjt Parish =

Parish in Aabenraa Municipality, Denmark

Coordinates: 55.0897°N 9.4615°E

Løjt Parish Løjt Sogn
- Parish
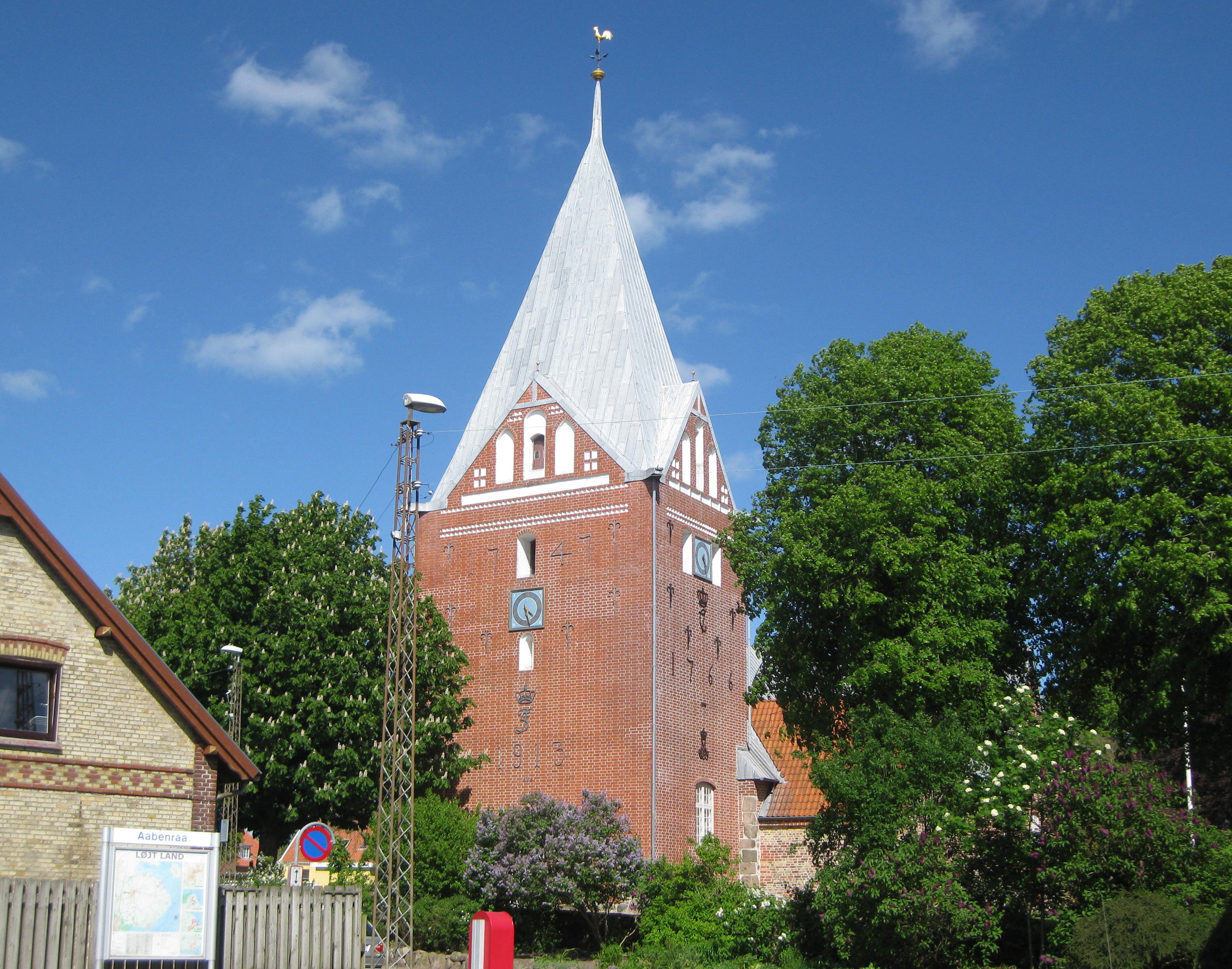
- Løjt Church

- The parish within Aabenraa Municipality
- Country: Denmark
- Region: Southern Denmark
- Municipality: Aabenraa Municipality
- Diocese: Haderslev

Population (2025)
  - Total: 3,552
- Parish number: 9012

Løjt Parish (Danish: Løjt Sogn) is a parish in the Diocese of Haderslev in Aabenraa Municipality, Denmark.
