= Frederiksborg County =

Coordinates: 55°56′N 12°19′E

Frederiksborg County Frederiksborg Amt (Danish)
- Former county
- Coat of arms

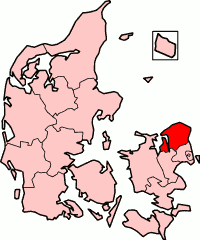
- Frederiksborg County in Denmark
- Seat: Hillerød

Area
  - Total: 1,347 km^{2} (520 sq mi)

Population (2006)
  - Total: 378,686

Frederiksborg County (Danish: Frederiksborg Amt) is a former county (Danish: amt) in the north of the island of Zealand in eastern Denmark. Effective January 1, 2007, the county was abolished and merged into Region Hovedstaden (i.e. Copenhagen Capital Region).

== List of County Mayors ==
From	To	County Mayor
April 1, 1970	March 31, 1978	Hans Andersen (Venstre)
April 1, 1978	August 22, 1982 †	Svenn Schmidt (Conservative)
August 22, 1982	September 8, 1982	Jørgen Christiansen (acting) (Venstre)
September 9, 1982	December 31, 1985	Bent Løber (Conservative)
January 1, 1986	December 31, 1989	Jørgen Christiansen (Venstre)
January 1, 1990	December 31, 1997	Kirsten Ebbensgaard (Conservative)
January 1, 1998	December 31, 2001	Lars Løkke Rasmussen (Venstre)
January 1, 2002	December 31, 2006	Jørgen Christensen (Venstre)

== Municipalities (1970-2006) ==
- Allerød
- Birkerød
- Farum
- Fredensborg-Humlebæk
- Frederikssund
- Frederiksværk
- Græsted-Gilleleje
- Helsinge
- Helsingør
- Hillerød
- Hundested
- Hørsholm
- Jægerspris
- Karlebo
- Skibby
- Skævinge
- Slangerup
- Stenløse
- Ølstykke
